= List of Ribes species =

List of species in the Saxifragales genus, Ribes

This list of Ribes species includes many of the approximately 200 accepted species within the plant genus Ribes, the sole genus in the family Grossulariaceae, order Saxifragales. Species in this genus are traditionally grouped into several subgenera, including subgenus Ribes (commonly referred to as currants) and subgenus Grossularia (commonly known as gooseberries).

== Subgenus Ribes L. ==
=== Section Berisia Spach ===
This section comprises Alpine currants, dioecious species distributed through Eurasia

Flowers	Fruit	Scientific name	Distribution
		Ribes achurjani Mulk.	Armenia
		Ribes acuminatum Wall. ex G.Don	India
		Ribes armenum Pojark.	South Caucasus
		Ribes alpinum L. – alpine currant	northern Europe from Finland and Norway south to the Alps and Pyrenees and Caucasus, Georgia
		Ribes diacanthum Pall. – Siberian currant	(Russia, Mongolia, Korea, northeastern China (Heilongjiang, Jilin, Inner Mongolia)
		Ribes giraldii Jancz.	China (E Gansu, Liaoning, Shaanxi, SW Shanxi.)
		Ribes glabricalycinum L.T.Lu	China (Sichuan)
		Ribes glabrifolium L.T.Lu	China (W Hubei, S Shaanxi)
		Ribes glaciale Wallich – glacier currant	China (SE Gansu, Henan, W Hubei, Shaanxi, Sichuan, SE Xizang, NW Yunnan), Bhutan, N India, Kashmir, N Myanmar, Nepal, Sikkim
		Ribes henryi Franch.	China (W. Sichuan, Hubei)
		Ribes heterotrichum C.A.Mey.	Central Asia to Mongolia and N. Pakistan.
		Ribes humile Jancz.	China (Sichuan)
		Ribes hunanense Chang Y.Yang & C.J.Qi	China ( Guangxi, Hunan)
		Ribes kialanum Jancz.	China (W. Sichuan, NW. Yunnan)
		Ribes komarovii Pojark.	Russian Far East, northern and central China, North Korea
		Ribes laurifolium Jancz. – evergreen currant	China (W. Sichuan, Guizhou, Yunnan) to Myanmar.
		Ribes luridum Hook. & Thoms. – purple currant	Nepal to China (W. Sichuan, NW. Yunnan)
		Ribes maximowiczii Batal. – common Korean currant	China (Heilongjiang, Jilin, E Liaoning), Japan, Korea, Russia
		Ribes melananthum Boiss. & Hohen.	Iran
		Ribes orientale Desf. – Siberian currant	China (W Sichuan, Xizang, NW Yunnan), Bhutan, India, Kashmir, Nepal, Russia; SW Asia, SE Europe
		Ribes saxatile Pall.	China (Xinjiang), Russia
		Ribes takare D.Don	China, Bhutan, N India, Kashmir, Myanmar, Nepal, Sikkim
		Ribes tianquanense S.H.Yu & J.M.Xu	China (Sichuan)
		Ribes pseudofasciculatum K.S.Hao	China (Xizhang, Sichuan, Qinghai)
		Ribes pulchellum Turcz.	S. Siberia to N. China.
		Ribes rubrisepalum L.T.Lu	China (Gansu, S Shaanxi, W Sichuan, NW Yunnan.)
		Ribes tenue Jancz.	China ( E Gansu, W Henan, W Hubei, NW Hunan, SW Shaanxi, Sichuan, Yunnan)
		Ribes vilmorinii Jancz.	China (Hebei, W Sichuan, NW Yunnan.)
		Ribes xizangense L.T.Lu	China (Xizang)

=== Section Calobotrya (Spach) Jancz. ===
This section comprises North American species commonly known as ornamental currants

Flowers	Fruit	Scientific name	Distribution
		Ribes brandegeei Eastw.	Mexico
		Ribes canthariforme Wiggins – Moreno currant	Endemic to San Diego County, California
		Ribes cereum Douglas – Squaw currant, wax currant, white field currant, whiskey currant	British Columbia, Alberta, and much of the western United States, from Washington, Oregon, and California east as far as the western Dakotas and the Oklahoma Panhandle
		Ribes ceriferum Coville & Rose	Mexico (Durango and Chihuahua)
		Ribes ciliatum Humb. & Bonpl.	Mexico
		Ribes dugesii Greenm.	Mexico
		Ribes grande Rose	Mexico (Puebla)
		Ribes indecorum Eastw. – white-flowered currant	Santa Barbara County in California south into northern Baja California.
		Ribes malvaceum Sm. – Chaparral currant	California and northern Baja California
		Ribes mescalerium Coville – Mescalero currant	southeastern New Mexico, western Texas, and the Mexican State of Chihuahua.
		Ribes neglectum Rose	Mexico
		Ribes nelsonii Coville & Rose	Mexico (Sonora, Chihuahua)
		Ribes nevadense Kellogg – Sierra currant, Jaeger's currant, Nevada currant	California, Nevada, Oregon
		Ribes orizabae Rose	Mexico (Veracruz)
		Ribes pringlei Rose	Central & SW. Mexico.
		Ribes sanguineum Pursh – flowering currant, redflower currant, blood currant, sticky blood currant, blackseed blood currant, winter currant	western United States and Canada.
		Ribes tortuosum Benth.	Mexico
		Ribes viscosissimum Pursh – sticky currant	United States, Canada
		Ribes wolfii Rothr. – Wolf's currant	northern Idaho, northeastern Oregon, and southeastern Washington. Utah, Colorado, Arizona, and New Mexico, Mexico

=== Section Coreosma (Spach) Jancz. ===
This section comprises Eurasian and American black currants

Flowers	Fruit	Scientific name	Distribution
		Ribes americanum Mill. – American blackcurrant, wild blackcurrant	Canada (from Alberta to Nova Scotia) and the northern United States (from New England to Washington, with additional populations in Colorado and New Mexico)
		Ribes bracteosum Douglas ex Hook. – stink currant	southeastern Alaska to Mendocino County in California
		Ribes dikuscha Fisch. ex Turcz.	Siberia to Russian Far East.
		Ribes hudsonianum Richards – northern blackcurrant, Hudson Bay currant, western blackcurrant	Canada, from Quebec westwards; and parts of the United States (Alaska, the Great Lakes region, the northern Rockies, Cascades, Blue Mountains, and other parts of the Northwest)
		Ribes janczewskii Pojark.	Kazakhstan, Kyrgyzstan, Tajikistan
		Ribes japonicum Maxim. – Japanese blackcurrant, thornless blackcurrant	Japan (Hokkaido, Honshu, Shikoku)
		Ribes malvifolium Pojark.	Tajikistan
		Ribes nigrum L. – Blackcurrant, European blackcurrant	northern Europe and northern Asia
		Ribes procumbens Pall. – trailing redcurrant	Siberia to N. Korea, Japan (C. Honshu)
		Ribes ussuriense Jancz. – Korean blackcurrant (synonym of Ribes procumbens)	Siberia to N. Korea, Japan (C. Honshu)
		Ribes viburnifolium A.Gray – Island gooseberry	Southern California

=== Section Symphocalyx Berland. ===
Flowers	Fruit	Scientific name	Distribution
		Ribes aureum Pursh – buffalo currant, clove currant, golden currant. Includes well-known cultivar 'Gwen.'	Canada, most of the United States (except the southeast) and northern Mexico.

=== Section Grossularioides ( Jancz.) Rehd. ===
This section comprises spiny or Gooseberry-stemmed currants from North America

Flowers	Fruit	Scientific name	Distribution
		Ribes lacustre (Pers.) Poir. – black gooseberry, prickly currant, black swamp gooseberry	California to Alaska and across North America east to Pennsylvania and Newfoundland, and south as far as New Mexico.
		Ribes montigenum McClat. – gooseberry currant	Washington south to California and east as far as the Rocky Mountains

=== Section Heritiera Jancz. ===
Flowers	Fruit	Scientific name	Distribution
		Ribes erythrocarpum Coville & Leiberg – Crater Lake currant	Cascade Mountains in the US State of Oregon
		Ribes acerifolium T.J Howell – maple currant, mapleleaf currant	Canadian Province of British Columbia as well as to the northwestern United States (Washington, Idaho, Oregon)
		Ribes glandulosum Grauer ex Weber – skunk currant, fetid currant	United States (Alaska, the Great Lakes region, the Appalachian Mountains, and the Northeast)
		Ribes laxiflorum Pursh – trailing blackcurrant	from Alaska and Yukon south as far as northern California and New Mexico

=== Section Parilla Jancz. ===
Flowers	Fruit	Scientific name	Distribution
		Ribes andicola Jancz.	Colombia
		Ribes albifolium Ruiz & Pav.	Peru
		Ribes austroecuadorense Freire-Fierro	Ecuador
		Ribes chachapoyense Weigend & Breitkopf	Peru
		Ribes colandina Weigend	Peru
		Ribes contumazensis Weigend	Peru
		Ribes costaricense Weigend	Costa Rica
		Ribes cucullatum Hook. & Arn.	Argentina and Chile
		Ribes dombeyanum (Spach) Jancz.	Peru
		Ribes ecuadorense Jancz.	Colombia, Ecuador
		Ribes erectum Freire-Fierro	Colombia, Ecuador
|		Ribes fasciculatum Siebold & Zucc. – Japanese currant	China, Japan, and Korea,
		Ribes hirticaule J.F.Macbr.	Peru
		Ribes hirtum Willd. ex Roem. & Schult.	Colombia to Ecuador.
		Ribes incarnatum Wedd.	Peru to W. Bolivia.
		Ribes incertum J.F.Macbr.	Peru.
		Ribes integrifolium Phil.	Chile
		Ribes lehmannii Jancz.	Ecuador.
		Ribes luteynii Weigend	Ecuador
		Ribes macrobotrys Ruiz & Pav.	Peru
		Ribes macrostachyum Jancz.	Peru.
		Ribes magellanicum Jancz.	Chile and Argentina
		Ribes nanophyllum Freire-Fierro & L.Endara	Ecuador
		Ribes nitidissima Neger.	Chile
		Ribes ovalifolium Jancz.	Peru
		Ribes parvifolium Phil.	Chile.
		Ribes pentlandii Britton	Peru to W. Bolivia
		Ribes peruvianum Jancz.	Peru.
		Ribes polyanthes Phil.	Chile.
		Ribes praecox J.F.Macbr.	Peru
		Ribes punctatum Ruiz & Pav.	Chile
		Ribes ruizii Rehder.	Chile
		Ribes sanchezii Weigend	Peru.
		Ribes sardoum Martelli – Sardinian currant	Sardegna
		Ribes steinbachiorum Weigend & Binder	Bolivia
		Ribes sucheziense Jancz.	Bolivia
		Ribes tolimense Cuatrec.	Colombia
		Ribes trilobum Meyen.	Central & S. Central Chile.
		Ribes valdivianum Phil.	Chile
		Ribes weberbaueri Jancz.	Peru

=== Section Ribes L. ===
Flowers	Fruit	Scientific name	Distribution
		Ribes altissimum Turcz. ex Pojark. – tall currant	Mongolia, Russia (Siberia), China (Xinjiang)
		Ribes griffithii Hook.f. & Thomson	Nepal to China (W. Sichuan, NW. Yunnan)
		Ribes himalense Royle ex Decne.– smooth rock currant	Pakistan to SW China
		Ribes latifolium Jancz. – broadleaf currant	China (S. Jilin) to N. Korea, Sakhalin to N. Japan
		Ribes longeracemosum Franch. – Tibet thornless blackcurrant	China (Sichuan, Yunnan, W. Hubei).
		Ribes mandshuricum (Maxim.) Kom.	Russian Far East to N. & E. Central China and Korea.
		Ribes meyeri Maxim. – Meyer's currant	Central Asia to Mongolia and NE. Afghanistan
		Ribes moupinense Franch.	Central & S. China.
		Ribes multiflorum Kit. – manyflower currant	Central Italy, Balkan Peninsula to W. Central Turkey
		Ribes pallidiflorum Pojark.	northeastern China to Russia
		Ribes petraeum Wulf. – rock currant, rock redcurrant, Bieberstein's rock currant	Europe
		Ribes rubrum L. – redcurrant, white currant	Europe
		Ribes sachalinense (F.Schmidt) Nakai	Sakhalin to Japan (Hokkaido, Honshu, Shikoku).
		Ribes setchuense Jancz.	China (Sichuan, SE. Gansu)
		Ribes soulieanum Jancz.	Tibet to China (NW. Yunnan).
		Ribes spicatum Robson – Nordic redcurrant, Nordic currant, downy currant	northern Europe and northern Asia
		Ribes triste Pall. – northern redcurrant or swamp redcurrant, wild redcurrant	Canada and the northern United States, as well as in eastern Asia (Russia, China, Korea, Japan)
		Ribes turbinatum Pojark.	Kazakhstan

== Subgenus Grossularia (Mill.) Pers. ==
=== Section Grossularia(Mill.) Nutt. ===
Flowers	Fruit	Scientific name	Distribution
		Ribes aciculare Sm. – needle-spined gooseberry	northern China, Siberia.
		Ribes alpestre Wall. ex Decne.	from Afghanistan to SW China
		Ribes ambiguum Maxim.	China South-Central, Japan
		Ribes burejense F.Schmidt	China, N Korea, Mongolia, Russia
		Ribes curvatum Small – Granite gooseberry	United States (Texas, Oklahoma, Louisiana, Arkansas, Tennessee, Georgia, Alabama)
		Ribes cynosbati L. – prickly gooseberry, eastern prickly gooseberry, dogberry, dog bramble	eastern and central United States and Canada
		Ribes divaricatum Douglas – spreading gooseberry, wild gooseberry, coast gooseberry, coastal black gooseberry, Parish's gooseberry, Worcesterberry	western North America from British Columbia to California
		Ribes echinellum (Cov.) Rehder – Miccosukee gooseberry	Florida, South Carolina
		Ribes formosanum Hayata	Taiwan.
		Ribes grossularioides Maxim. – Japanese gooseberry, catberry	Japan
		Ribes hirtellum Michx. – North American gooseberry, hairystem gooseberry, currant gooseberry	Canada and the northern United States
		Ribes horridum Rupr. – thorny currant	Russian Far East to N. Korea, Japan
		Ribes inerme Rydb. – whitestem gooseberry, Klamath gooseberry	British Columbia to California and westward to the Rocky Mountains
		Ribes missouriense Nutt. – Missouri gooseberry	north-central United States (Great Lakes, upper Mississippi and lower Missouri Valleys)
		Ribes niveum Lindl. – snow gooseberry, slender-branched gooseberry	western United States (Washington, Idaho, Oregon, and Nevada with isolated populations in Colorado and New Mexico)
		Ribes oxyacanthoides L. – American mountain gooseberry, Canadian gooseberry, stream gooseberry, Henderson's gooseberry, Idaho gooseberry	Alaska through much of Canada and the western and north-central United States
		Ribes rotundifolium Michx. – Appalachian gooseberry, round-leaved gooseberry	Massachusetts and the Appalachian Mountains south as far as South Carolina and Tennessee
		Ribes sinanense F.Maek. – Chinese gooseberry	Japan (C. Honshu)
		Ribes stenocarpum Maxim. – narrow-fruited currant	S. & E. Qinghai to China Gansu, Shaanxi, NW. Sichuan
		Ribes uva-crispa L. – gooseberry, wild gooseberry, European gooseberry, English gooseberry	Europe, the Caucasus and northern Africa

== Subgenus Hesperia A.Berger ==
Flowers	Fruit	Scientific name	Distribution
		Ribes amarum McClatchie – bitter gooseberry	California
		Ribes californicum Hook. & Arn. – Hillside gooseberry, California gooseberry, Monterey gooseberry	California
		Ribes cruentum Greene – shinyleaf currant, Oregon currant	California, Oregon
		Ribes leptosma (Coville) Fedde	California
		Ribes menziesii Pursh – Canyon gooseberry, Menzies' gooseberry	California and Oregon
		Ribes roezlii Reg. – Sierra gooseberry, Roezl's gooseberry	California, its distribution extending east into Nevada and north into Oregon
		Ribes victoris Greene – Victor's gooseberry	California

== Subgenus Lobbia A. Berger ==
=== Section Lobbia ===
Flowers	Fruit	Scientific name	Distribution
		Ribes binominatum A.Heller – ground gooseberry	northern California and western Oregon.
		Ribes lasianthum Greene – alpine gooseberry	California, Nevada
		Ribes leptanthum A.Gray – trumpet gooseberry	Arizona, Colorado, New Mexico, Texas, and Utah
		Ribes lobbii A.Gray – gummy gooseberry	United States (Siskiyou Mountains, eastern Columbia Gorge, Crater Lake National Park, Mount Rainier National Park, Olympic National Park) and British Columbia in Canada
		Ribes marshallii Greene – Hupa gooseberry	southern Oregon and northern California
		Ribes microphyllum Kunth	Guatemala, Mexico
		Ribes pinetorum Greene – orange currant	Arizona and New Mexico.
		Ribes quercetorum Greene – rock gooseberry	California
		Ribes sericeum Eastw. – Lucia gooseberry	California
		Ribes tularense (Coville) Fedde. – Tulare gooseberry	southern California
		Ribes velutinum Greene – desert gooseberry, Gooding's gooseberry	Montana, Idaho, Washington, Oregon, Utah, Nevada, California, and Arizona
		Ribes watsonianum Koehne – spring gooseberry	Washington and Oregon.

=== Section Robsonia Berland. ===
Flowers	Fruit	Scientific name	Distribution
		Ribes speciosum Pursh – fuchsia-flowered gooseberry	southern California and Baja California
		Ribes thacherianum (Jeps.) Munz	coast of California

== Hybrids ==
Flowers	Fruit	Scientific name	Parents
		Ribes x bethmontii Jancz.	Ribes malvaceum x R. sanguineum
		Ribes × culverwellii	Ribes nigrum x Ribes uva-crispa
		Ribes × futurum Jancz.	Ribes rubrum × Ribes warszewiczii
		Ribes x gonduini Jancz.	Ribes petraeum × Ribes rubrum
		Ribes × gordonianum Lem.	Ribes odoratum × Ribes sanguineum
		Ribes × holocericeum Otto & A.Dietr.	Ribes petraeum × Ribes spicatum
		Ribes × houghtonianum Jancz.	Ribes rubrum × Ribes spicatum
		Ribes × koehneanum Jancz.	Ribes multiflorum × Ribes rubrum
		Ribes × nidigrolaria Rud.Bauer & A.Bauer – Jostaberry	Ribes divaricatum x Ribes uva-crispa
		Ribes × van-fleetianum (A.Berger) Standl.	Ribes missouriense × Ribes uva-crispa.
		Ribes x varoi Blanca	Ribes uva-crispa × Ribes petraeum
