= List of gooseberries =

Gooseberry most often refers to cultivated plants from two species of the genus Ribes:

- Ribes uva-crispa native to Europe, northwestern Africa and southwestern Asia.
- Ribes hirtellum, American gooseberry
- Hybrids between Ribes hirtellum and Ribes uva-crispa, including most of the modern gooseberry cultivars

The common name is also used for the following botanical groups.

== Ribes ==
Gooseberries may be used to describe the genus Ribes as a whole, or particular wild species of Ribes contrasted with currants, including:

- Ribes amarum, bitter gooseberry, native to California
- Ribes binominatum, trailing gooseberry, native to northwestern North America
- Ribes californicum, California gooseberry
- Ribes cynosbati, prickly gooseberry, native to eastern North America
- Ribes divaricatum, spreading gooseberry, native to western North America
- Ribes echinellum, Miccosukee gooseberry, native to Florida
- Ribes inerme, whitestem gooseberry, native to northwestern North America
- Ribes lacustre, swamp gooseberry, native to northwestern North America
- Ribes lasianthum, alpine gooseberry, native to California
- Ribes leptanthum, trumpet gooseberry, native to southwestern North America
- Ribes lobbii, gummy gooseberry, native to western North America
- Ribes marshallii, Hupa gooseberry, native to western North America
- Ribes menziesii, canyon gooseberry, native to California
- Ribes missouriense, Missouri gooseberry, native to eastern North America
- Ribes montigenum, mountain gooseberry, native to western North America
- Ribes oxyacanthoides, Canadian gooseberry, native to northern North America
- Ribes quercetorum, rock gooseberry, native to California
- Ribes roezlii, Sierra gooseberry, native to western North America
- Ribes sericeum, Lucia gooseberry, native to California
- Ribes speciosum, fuchsia-flowered gooseberry, native to California
- Ribes thacherianum, Santa Cruz gooseberry, native to Santa Cruz Island, California
- Ribes tularense, Sequoia gooseberry, native to California
- Ribes velutinum, desert gooseberry, native to western North America
- Ribes viburnifolium, Island gooseberry, native to California
- Ribes victoris, Victor's gooseberry, native to California
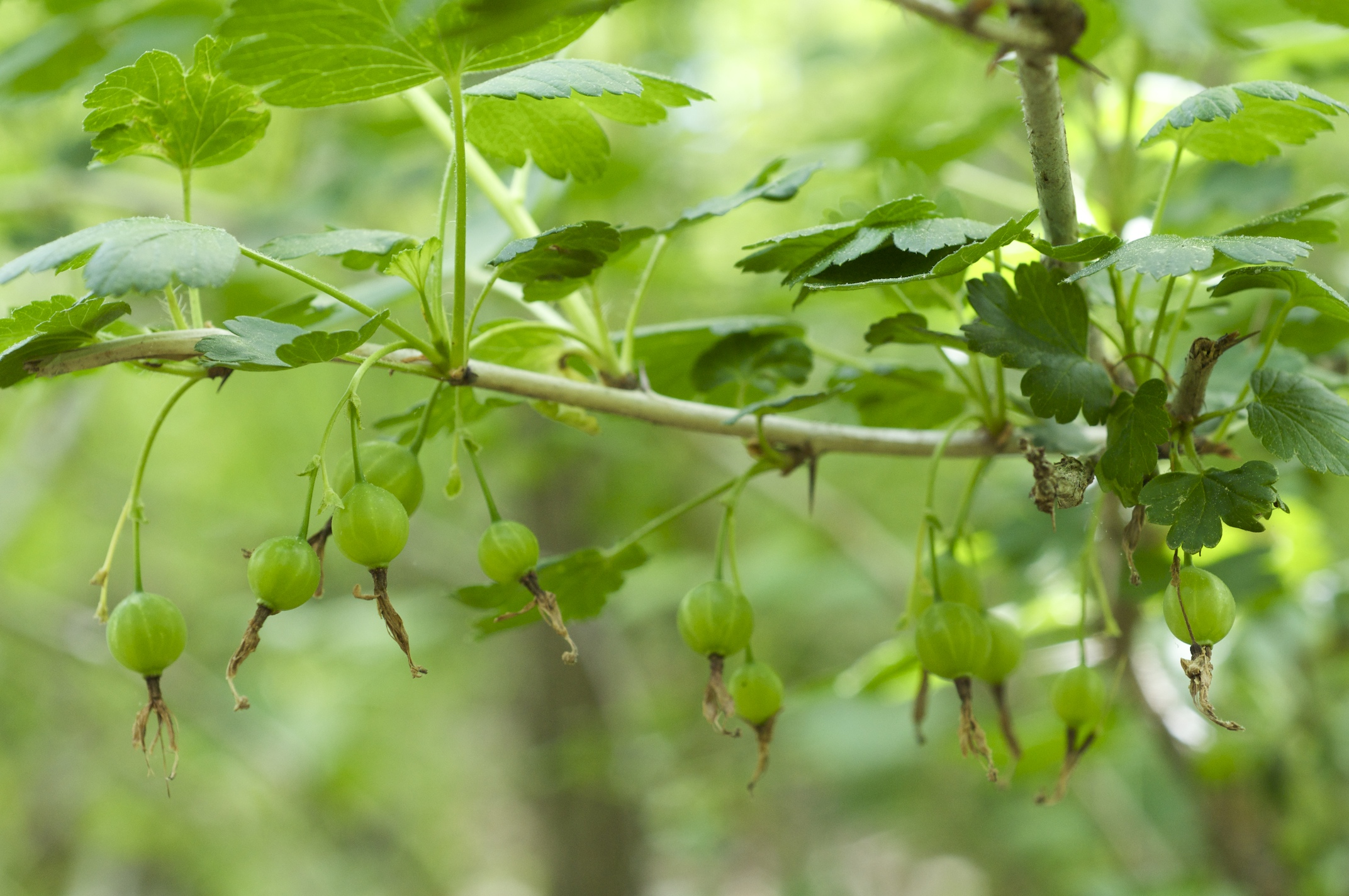
Missouri gooseberry, Ribes missouriense

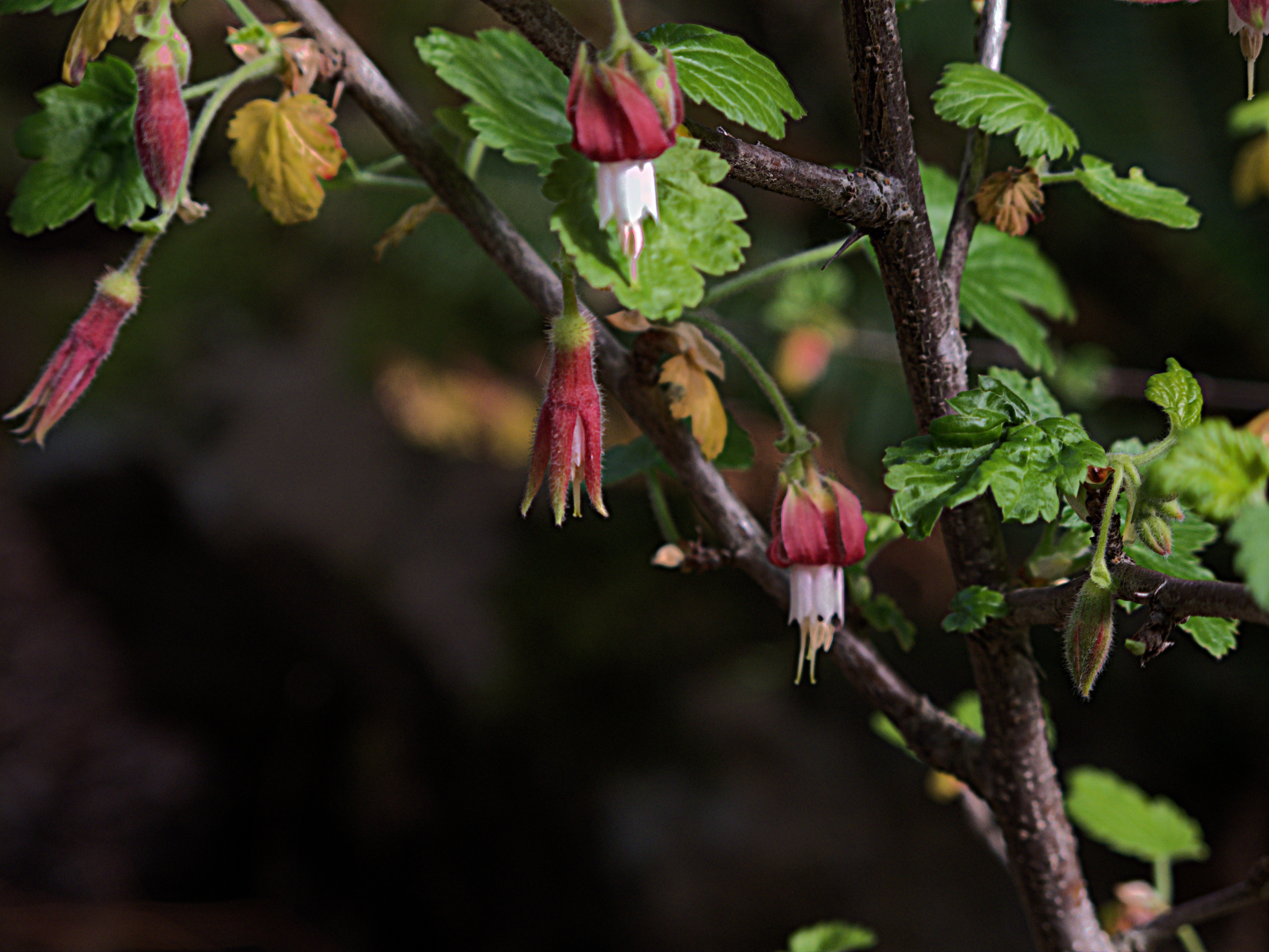
Santa Cruz Island gooseberry, Ribes thacherianum

== Plants unrelated to Ribes ==
Gooseberries may also be used to describe tropical plants producing fruit superficially similar to Ribes fruit. This includes:

- Byrsonima lucida, the "Long Key" gooseberry, native to the Caribbean
- Ceylon gooseberry, a species of Dovyalis, native to Sri Lanka and southern India
- Chinese gooseberry or kiwifruit, the edible berry of a cultivar group of the woody vine Actinidia deliciosa and hybrids between deliciosa and other Actinidia species
- Curio herreanus, a succulent native to South America that superficially resembles gooseberry
- Pereskia aculeata, the Barbados gooseberry, an unusual cactus
- Within family Phyllanthaceae:
  - Phyllanthus emblica, the Indian gooseberry or emblic
  - Jamaican gooseberry tree, an herb-like plant
  - The "Star gooseberry", meaning either:
    - Phyllanthus acidus, the "Otaheite gooseberry", the only Phyllanthoideae with edible fruit, or
    - Sauropus androgynus, a shrub grown in some tropical regions as a leaf vegetable
- Within family Solanaceae:
  - Physalis angulata, also called balloon or cutleaf groundcherry
  - Physalis peruviana, Cape gooseberry, indigenous to South America
- Withania somnifera, Poison gooseberry
