= Ribes contumazensis =

Scientific classification
- Kingdom: Plantae
- Clade: Tracheophytes
- Clade: Angiosperms
- Clade: Eudicots
- Order: Saxifragales
- Family: Grossulariaceae
- Genus: Ribes
- Species: R. contumazensis

Binomial name
- Ribes contumazensis Weigend

Species of plant

Ribes contumazensis is a species of currant, named after Peruvian botanist Isidoro Sánchez Vega of Cajamarca. It is completely glabrous apart from the stalked glands, differentiating it from R. colandina (same region).

== Description ==
It is a dioecious shrub approximately 12 metres (39 ft) tall, its shoots and adaxial leaf surfaces covered with scattered stalked glands less than half a millimetre long. Its petiole is 1,015 millimetres (40.0 in) long and 1 millimetre (0.039 in) wide, with its stipules well differentiated, united with the petiole for 34 millimetres (1.3 in). Its adaxial surface is subglabrous, eglandular, while the abaxial surface has scattered stalked glands especially on its primary and secondary veins. Inflorescences are terminal on short lateral shoots (brachyblasts); racemes are pendent, and the peduncle is 510 millimetres (20 in) long, with scattered stalked glands. Flowers are narrowly cyathiform and a brownish yellow colour, covered with scattered glandular trichomes. The hypanthium is 12 millimetres (0.47 in) long; calyx lobes are ovate and acuminate.

== Distribution ==
Cajamarca Department.
