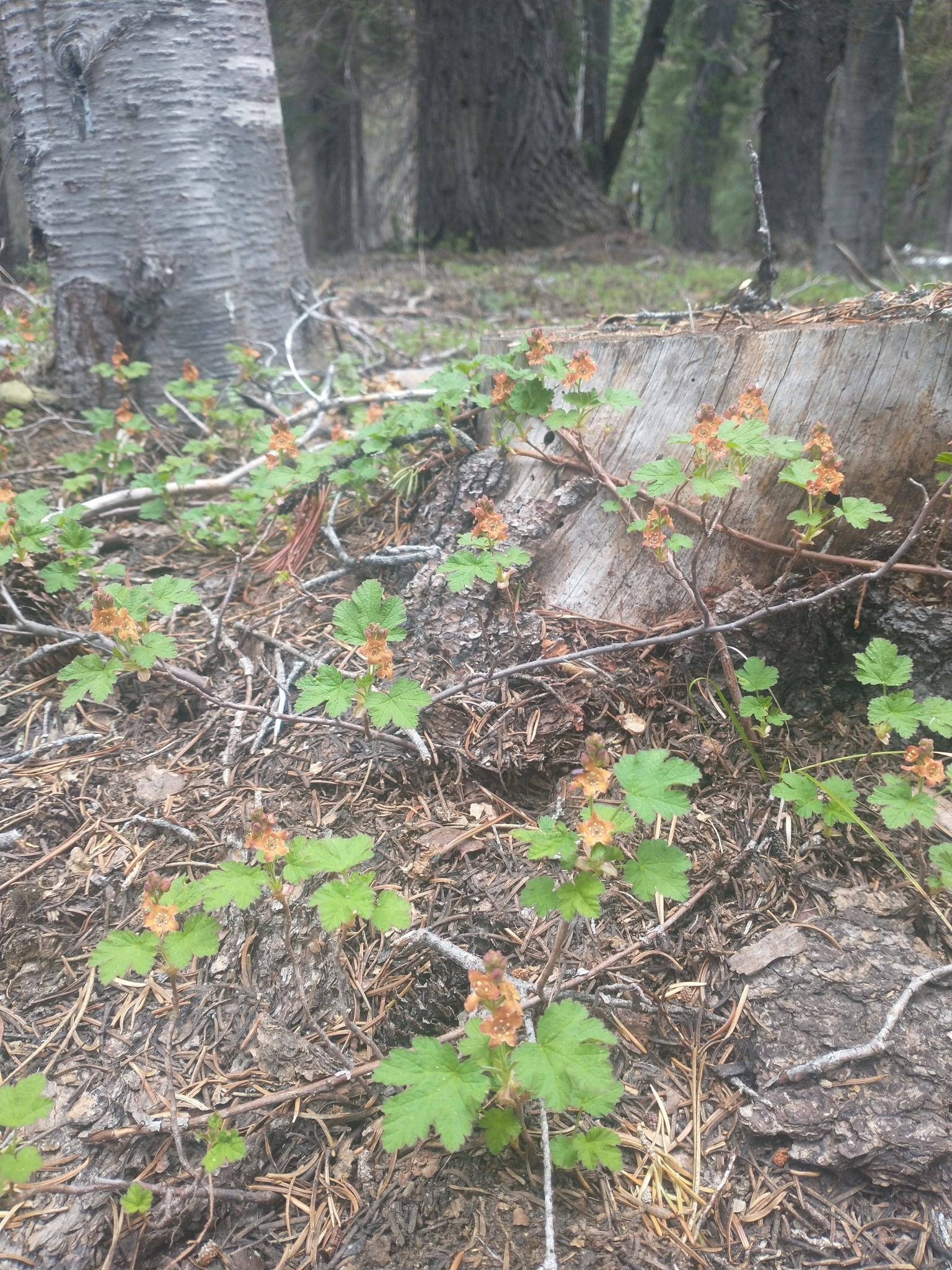

Scientific classification
- Kingdom: Plantae
- Clade: Tracheophytes
- Clade: Angiosperms
- Clade: Eudicots
- Order: Saxifragales
- Family: Grossulariaceae
- Genus: Ribes
- Species: R. erythrocarpum

Binomial name
- Ribes erythrocarpum Coville & Leiberg 1896

= Ribes erythrocarpum =

Species of currant

Ribes erythrocarpum is an uncommon North American species of currant known by the common name Crater Lake currant.

== Description ==
Ribes erythrocarpum is a trailing shrub with vertical branches up to 20 centimetres (8 in) tall. The leaves are 2.5–5 cm (1–2 in) wide, 3–5 lobed, with rounded teeth.

It produces copper- or salmon-colored flowers and scarlet egg-shaped berries.

Ribes laxiflorum is similar.

== Distribution and habitat ==
It is native to the Cascade Mountains in the US State of Oregon, including inside Crater Lake National Park. It grows on rocky sloped ground in subalpine forests.
