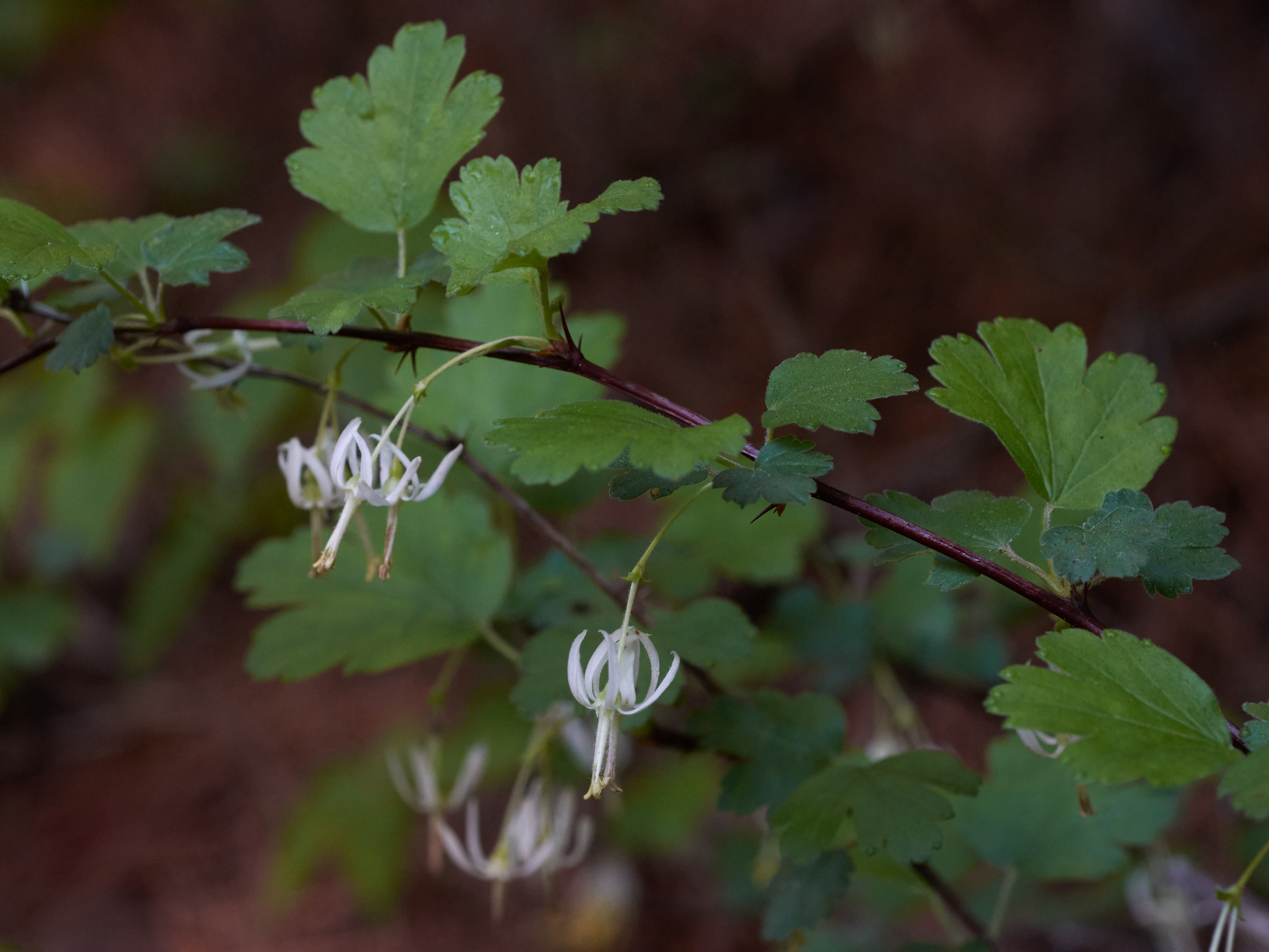

Scientific classification
- Kingdom: Plantae
- Clade: Tracheophytes
- Clade: Angiosperms
- Clade: Eudicots
- Order: Saxifragales
- Family: Grossulariaceae
- Genus: Ribes
- Species: R. curvatum

Binomial name
- Ribes curvatum Small 1896

Synonyms
- Ribes curvata Small; Grossularia curvata (Small) Coville & Britton

= Ribes curvatum =

Species of flowering plant

Ribes curvatum is a North American species of currant known by the common names granite gooseberry, drooping gooseberry and Georgia gooseberry. It is native to the southeastern and south-central United States (Texas, Oklahoma, Louisiana, Arkansas, Tennessee, Georgia, Alabama), and can be found in habitats ranging from dry rocky slopes to rich woodlands.

Ribes curvatum is a deciduous shrub up to 3 meters (9.8 feet) tall, though more often in the range 1–1.7 meters (3.3–5.6 ft). Stems are erect or recurving, with three reddish-brown spines at each node. They often root at the tips. The plant's leaves are alternate, petiolate and have three rounded lobes. Flowering takes place between March and May. The flowers are white, with conspicuous stamens, and have a strong clove-like scent. They may be solitary, or in 2-4 flowered racemes. Each flower has a bell-shaped hypanthium with scattered hairs. The sepals of each flower are white, separated, and spreading from each other, while petals are also white and separated, but remain in close contact. The fruit takes the form of berries, ripening in July. The berries, which are globes about 7-8mm in diameter, though larger sizes (up to 12mm) have been reported, are green or reddish-purple, and may be crowned by persistent stamens. The fruit have many seeds inside, and are eaten by birds and small mammals. The berries can also be eaten raw or cooked by humans, and are sometimes used in preserves. The taste is similar to an acidic gooseberry.
