= Ribes tularense =

Conservation status
- Critically Imperiled (NatureServe)

Scientific classification
- Kingdom: Plantae
- Clade: Tracheophytes
- Clade: Angiosperms
- Clade: Eudicots
- Order: Saxifragales
- Family: Grossulariaceae
- Genus: Ribes
- Species: R. tularense

Binomial name
- Ribes tularense (Coville) Fedde 1910 not (Coville) Standl. 1930

Synonyms
- Grossularia tularensis Coville 1908; Ribes tularensis (Coville) Fedde

Species of flowering plant

Ribes tularense is a rare species of currant known as the Sequoia gooseberry or Tulare gooseberry. It is endemic to southern California, at elevations between 1,500–1,800 metres (4,900–5,900 ft).

Ribes tularense is known from only about ten populations in the forests of the High Sierra Nevada. These are located in Tulare County except for one population found less than 100 meters east of the county line near Mount Whitney in Inyo County. The species is closely related to Ribes binominatum.

Ribes tularense is a low, spiny shrub rarely more than 50 cm (20 inches) tall, often trailing. It has hairy branches and hairy, toothed leaves. The flowers are greenish white and the fruits are yellow and bristly.
