= Ribes erectum =

Scientific classification
- Kingdom: Plantae
- Clade: Tracheophytes
- Clade: Angiosperms
- Clade: Eudicots
- Order: Saxifragales
- Family: Grossulariaceae
- Genus: Ribes
- Species: R. erectum

Binomial name
- Ribes erectum A.Freire-Fierro 1998

Species of shrub

Ribes erectum is a species of plant in the currant family. It is native to the Andes in Ecuador and Colombia.

Ribes erectum is a shrub or small tree up to 6 meters tall. Flowers are in elongated arrays of 16–30, each flower yellowish-green and cup-shaped. Fruits are green or yellow, nearly spherical.
