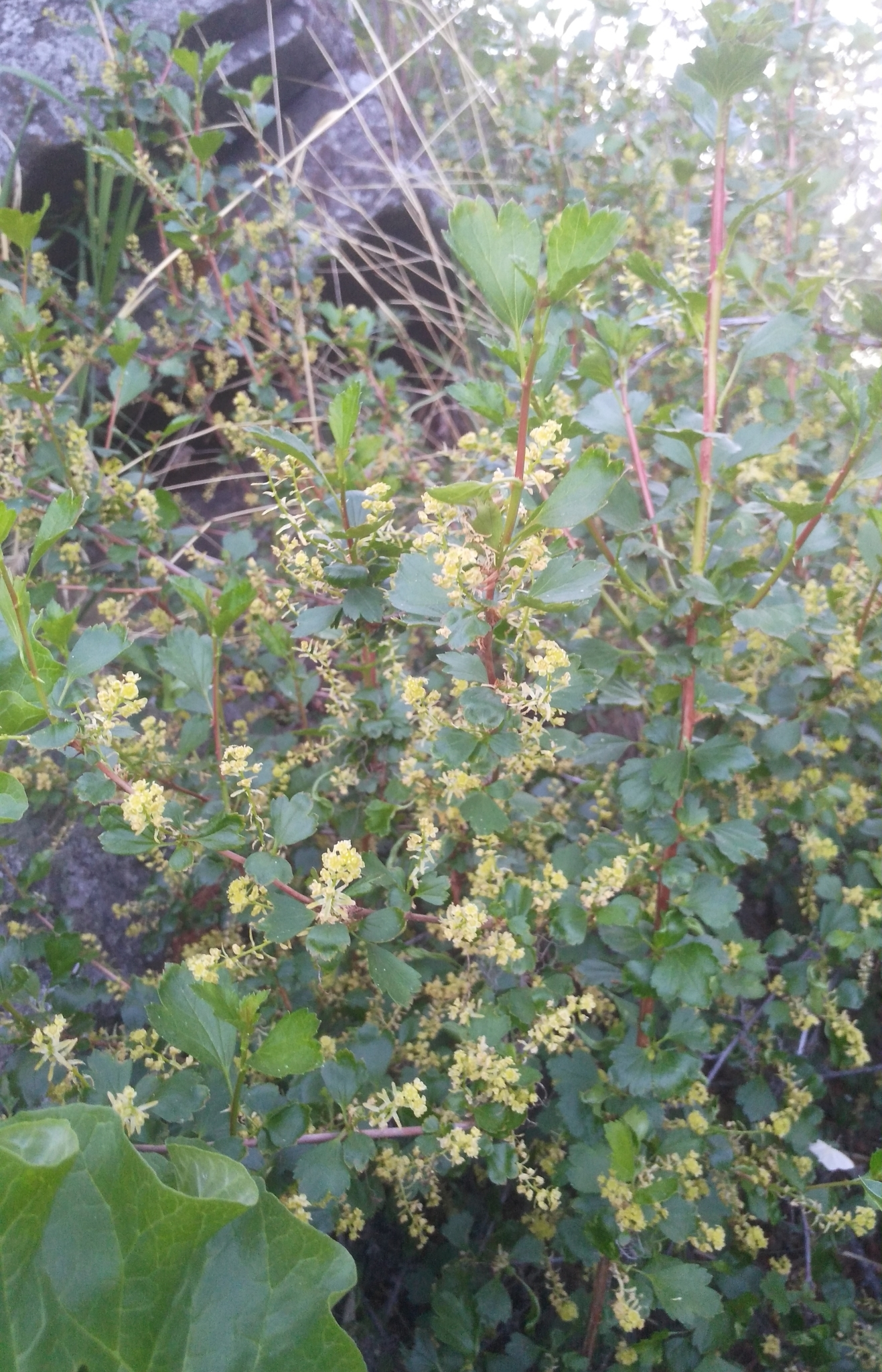

Scientific classification
- Kingdom: Plantae
- Clade: Embryophytes
- Clade: Tracheophytes
- Clade: Angiosperms
- Clade: Eudicots
- Order: Saxifragales
- Family: Grossulariaceae
- Genus: Ribes
- Species: R. diacanthum

Binomial name
- Ribes diacanthum Pall. 1776

= Ribes diacanthum =

Species of currant

Ribes diacanthum, the Siberian currant, is an Asian species of currant. It is native to northeastern Asia (Russia, Mongolia, Korea, northeastern China (Heilongjiang, Jilin, Inner Mongolia)). The species is also sparingly naturalised in the Canadian Province of Manitoba, having escaped in the 1940s from an agricultural experiment station near Brandon.

Ribes diacanthum is a shrub up to 2 meters (80 in) tall, dioecious (with male and female flowers on different plants). Flowers are yellow-green. Fruits are red, spherical, and reportedly good-tasting.
