= Ribes humile =

Scientific classification
- Kingdom: Plantae
- Clade: Tracheophytes
- Clade: Angiosperms
- Clade: Eudicots
- Order: Saxifragales
- Family: Grossulariaceae
- Genus: Ribes
- Species: R. humile

Binomial name
- Ribes humile Jancz.

Species of plant

Ribes humile, (ai cu li in Chinese, meaning swamp currant) is a tufted, dioecious shrub native to China, namely in Sichuan province. It is found along the sides of roads in montane woods and thickets, at 1000–3300 meters above sea-level.

Minute flowers arrive in May through June; hairless, red, globular fruits forming in July to August.
