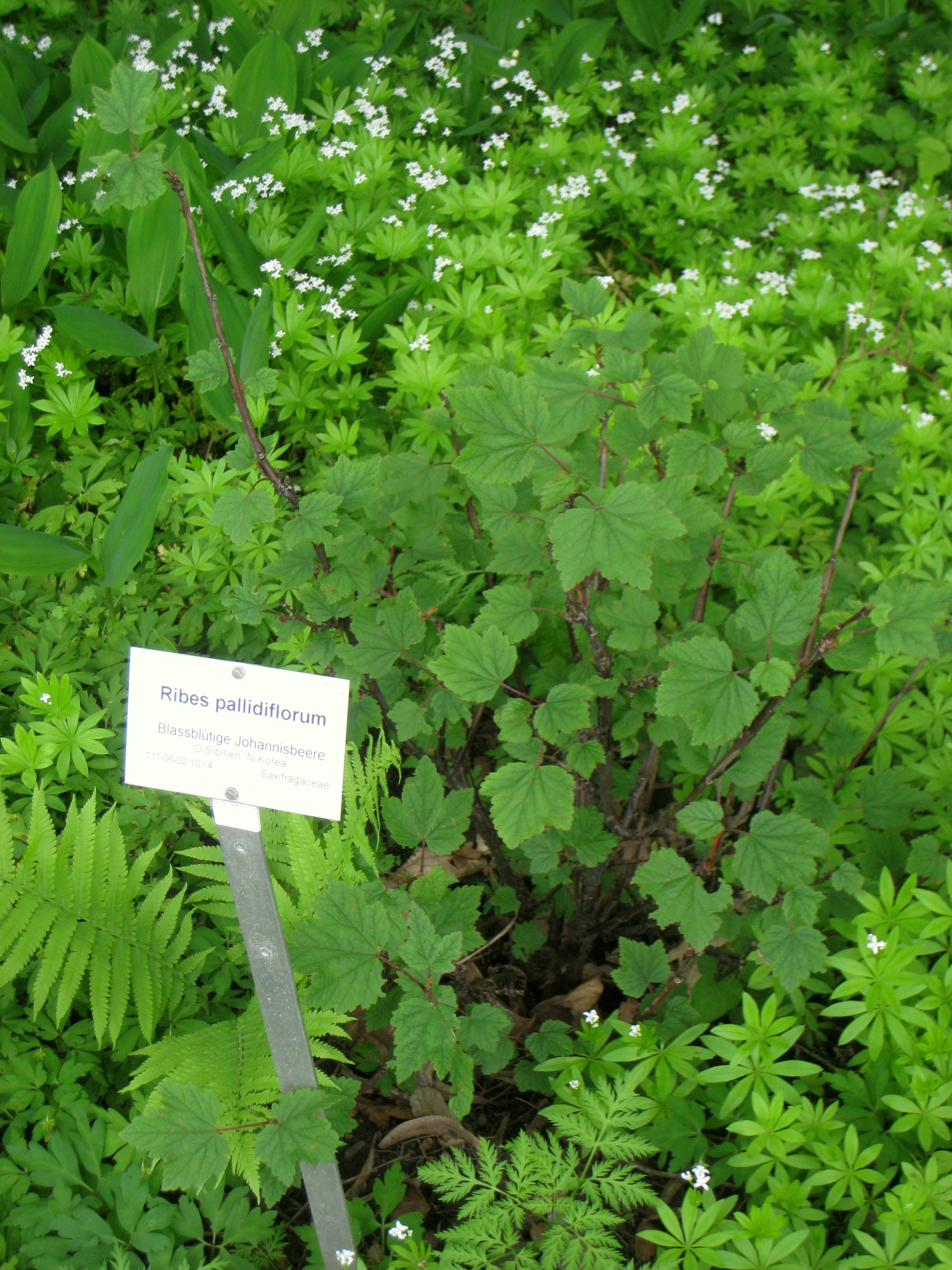

Scientific classification
- Kingdom: Plantae
- Clade: Tracheophytes
- Clade: Angiosperms
- Clade: Eudicots
- Order: Saxifragales
- Family: Grossulariaceae
- Genus: Ribes
- Species: R. pallidiflorum

Binomial name
- Ribes pallidiflorum Pojark.

= Ribes pallidiflorum =

Species of currant

Ribes pallidiflorum is a species in the genus Ribes native to the far east, from northeastern China to Russia (Amur, Khabarovsk, Primorye, Sakhalin, and in the southern part of the Kamchatka Peninsula).
