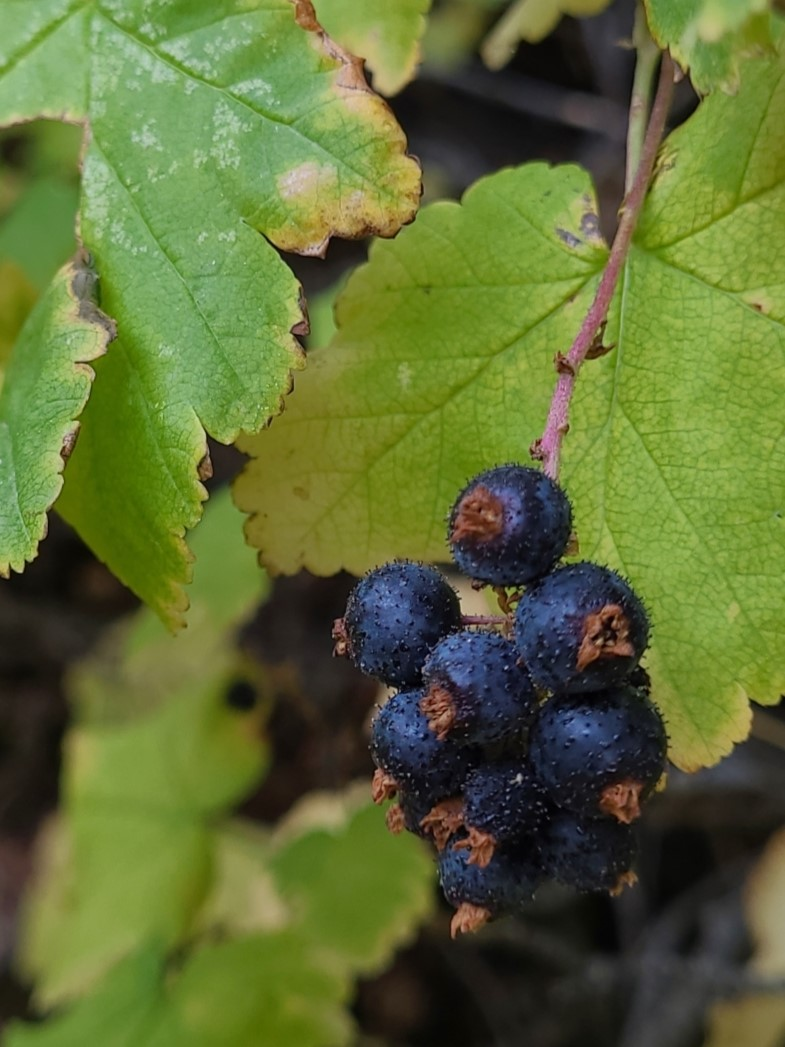

Conservation status
- Apparently Secure (NatureServe)

Scientific classification
- Kingdom: Plantae
- Clade: Tracheophytes
- Clade: Angiosperms
- Clade: Eudicots
- Order: Saxifragales
- Family: Grossulariaceae
- Genus: Ribes
- Species: R. wolfii

Binomial name
- Ribes wolfii Rothr., 1874

Synonyms
- Ribes mogollonicum Greene (1881)

= Ribes wolfii =

North American species of currant

Ribes wolfii is a North American species of currant known by the common names Wolf's currant and Rothrock currant. It is native to the western United States.

== Description ==
Ribes wolfii is a shrub up to 5 metres (16 ft) tall, with 3–5 lobed leaves and cream-colored, pinkish or green pink flowers. The berries are black, glandular, and reportedly sweet and tasty.

== Distribution and habitat ==
The distribution is disjunct or discontinuous, with two distinct concentrations of populations separate by a gap of over 320 km (200 miles). One is in northern Idaho, northeastern Oregon, and southeastern Washington. The other is in Utah, Colorado, Arizona, and New Mexico. There is also a report of an isolated population south of the border in Chihuahua, Mexico.

It grows in moist habitats including meadows and montane forests.

== Uses ==
The berries are edible.
