= Ribes austroecuadorense =

Conservation status
- Vulnerable (IUCN 3.1)

Scientific classification
- Kingdom: Plantae
- Clade: Tracheophytes
- Clade: Angiosperms
- Clade: Eudicots
- Order: Saxifragales
- Family: Grossulariaceae
- Genus: Ribes
- Species: R. austroecuadorense

Binomial name
- Ribes austroecuadorense A.Freire-Fierro 1998

Species of flowering plant

Ribes austroecuadorense is a species of plant in the currant family. It is endemic to Ecuador.

Its natural habitat is subtropical or tropical high-altitude shrubland.
