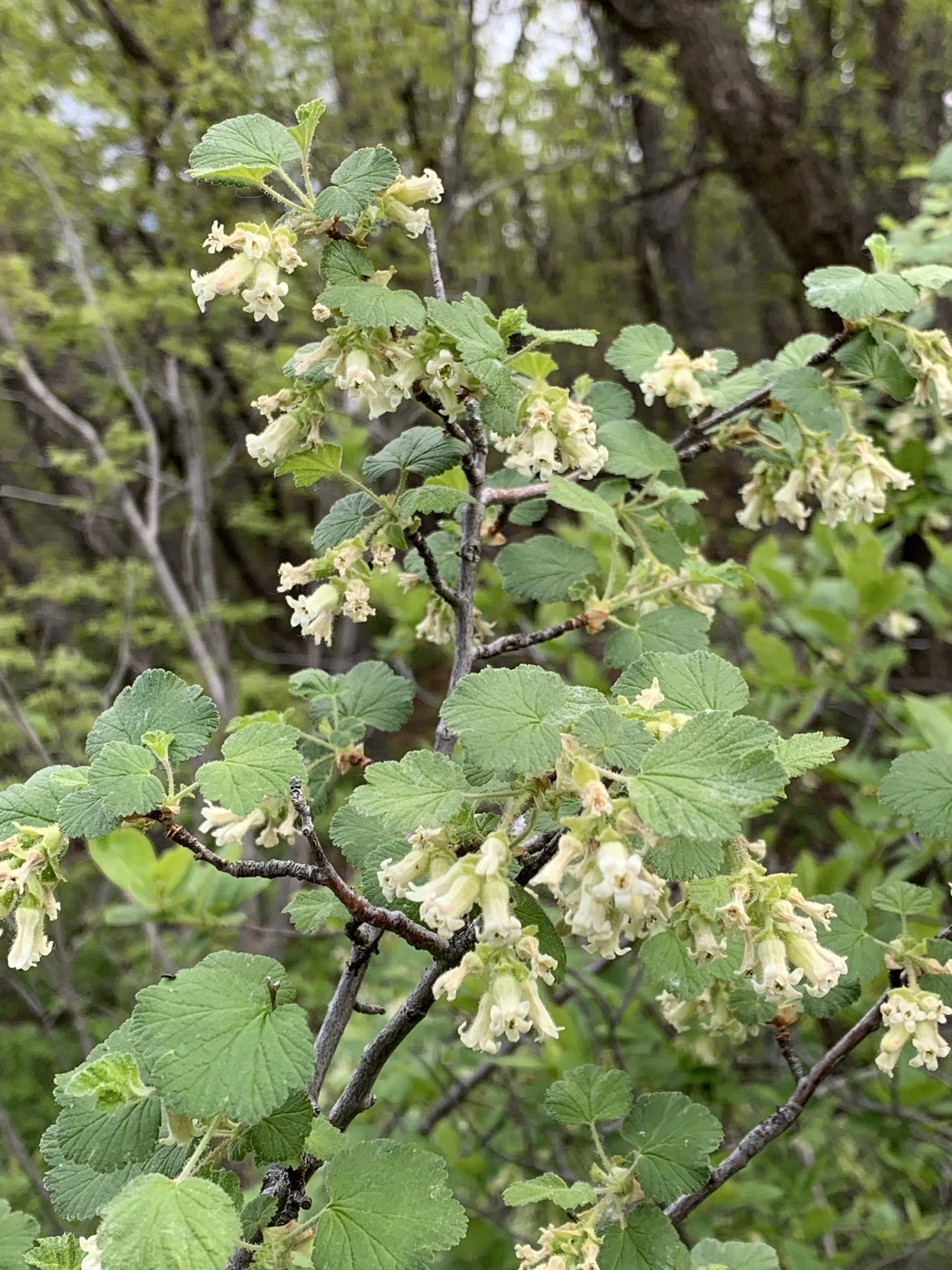

Scientific classification
- Kingdom: Plantae
- Clade: Tracheophytes
- Clade: Angiosperms
- Clade: Eudicots
- Order: Saxifragales
- Family: Grossulariaceae
- Genus: Ribes
- Species: R. mescalerium

Binomial name
- Ribes mescalerium Coville 1900

Synonyms
- Ribes inebrians var. mescalerium (Coville) Jancz.

= Ribes mescalerium =

Species of shrub

Ribes mescalerium, the Mescalero currant, is a shrub native to southeastern New Mexico, western Texas, and the Mexican State of Chihuahua. It grows in open areas in the mountains at elevation of 2,100–3,500 m (6,900–11,500 ft).

Ribes mescalerium reaches a height of up to 2 m (6.6 ft). Leaves are palmately lobed. Flowers are borne on a pendulent (hanging) raceme of 6-10 white flowers. Fruits are round, black up to 8 mm (0.31 in) across, juicy and good-tasting.
