= Ribes ceriferum =

Scientific classification
- Kingdom: Plantae
- Clade: Tracheophytes
- Clade: Angiosperms
- Clade: Eudicots
- Order: Saxifragales
- Family: Grossulariaceae
- Genus: Ribes
- Species: R. ceriferum

Binomial name
- Ribes ceriferum Coville & Rose 1905

Species of currant

Ribes ceriferum is a Mexican species of currants. It has been found in only a small number of locations in the States of Durango and Chihuahua. Some of the known populations lie inside Parque Nacional Cascada de Basaseachic (Basaseachic Falls National Park) in Chihuahua and Parque Natural de Mexiquillo (Mexiquillo Natural Park) in Durango.

Ribes ceriferum is a shrub up to 3 meters (10 feet) tall. The berries are black and hairless.
