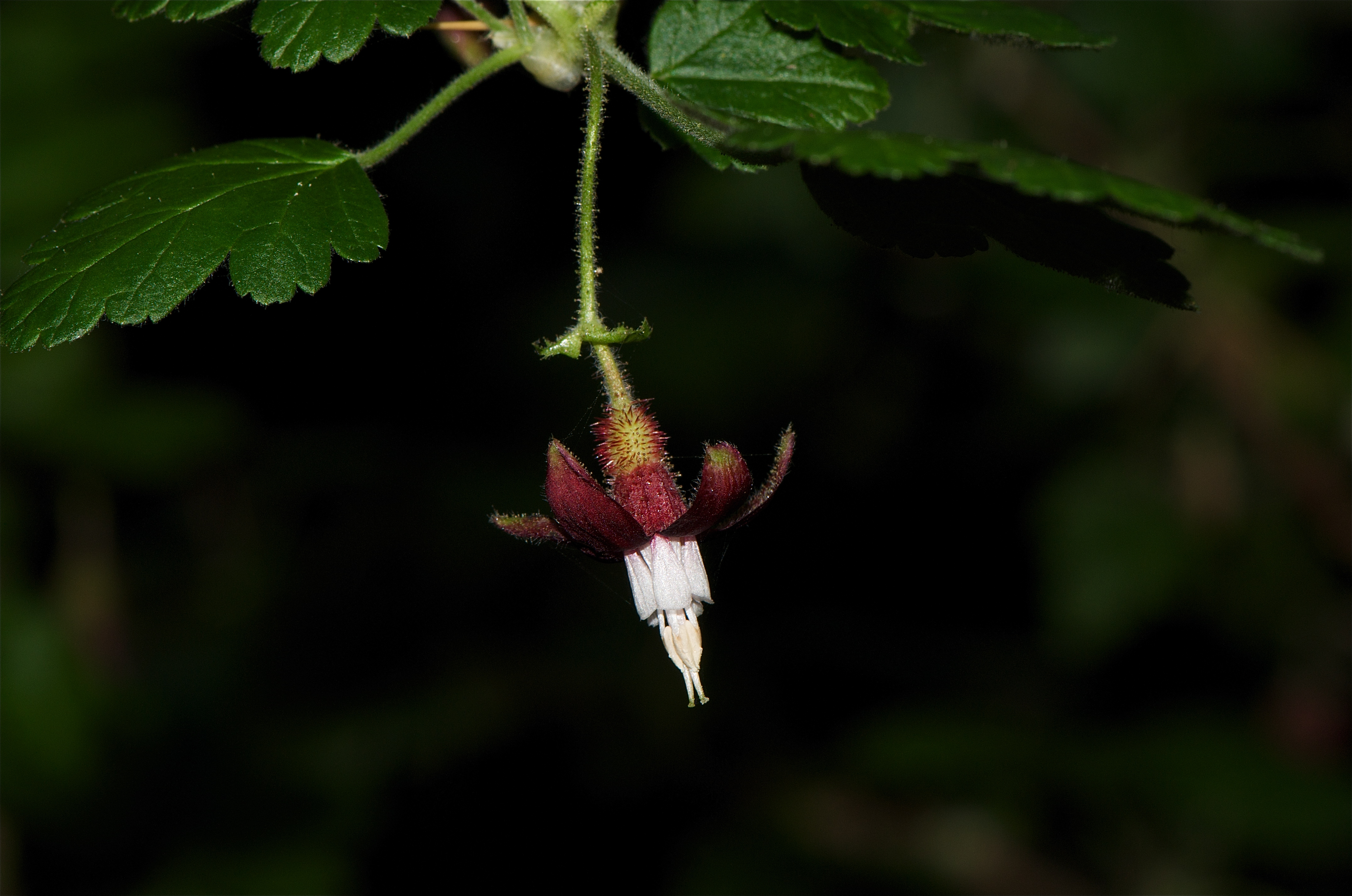

Scientific classification
- Kingdom: Plantae
- Clade: Tracheophytes
- Clade: Angiosperms
- Clade: Eudicots
- Order: Saxifragales
- Family: Grossulariaceae
- Genus: Ribes
- Species: R. menziesii

Binomial name
- Ribes menziesii Pursh

Synonyms
- Grossularia menziesii (Pursh) Coville & Britton; Ribes hysterix Eastw.; Grossularia senilis Coville; Ribes senile (Coville) Fedde; Ribes subvestitum Hook. & Arn.

= Ribes menziesii =

Species of flowering plant

Ribes menziesii, the canyon gooseberry, is a species of currant found only in California and Oregon.

== Description ==
Ribes menziesii is an aromatic deciduous shrub with very prickly branches growing up to 2 metres (6 1/2 ft) in height. It has somewhat rounded, hairy, glandular green leaves, which are 1.5–4 centimetres (1/2–1 1/2 in) wide.

Its showy hanging flowers have purplish-red sepals which are reflexed, or folded backwards along the length of the flower. The petals are white, yellow or pinkish, and extend forward to form a loose tube from which the stamens emerge.

The plant fruits purple gooseberries, which are edible but contain mainly seeds and little fruit. They are generally regarded as unpalatable. The plant's spines also make collecting fruit difficult.

== Varieties ==
Varieties of the species include:

- Ribes menziesii var. ixoderme — southern Sierra Nevada. Calflora taxon report, University of California: Ribes menziesii var. ixoderme
- Ribes menziesii var. menziesii — Coast Ranges.
- Ribes menziesii var. senile (Coville) Jeps. - Santa Cruz County

== Distribution and habitat ==
It is found only in California and Oregon.

There are five to six varieties of the species found across the low elevation mountains of California, especially the Coast Ranges, and the coastal canyons and foothills, into southern Oregon. It can be found in the chaparral plant community.

== Cultivation ==
Ribes menziesii is cultivated as an ornamental plant for native plant and wildlife gardens, in areas of suitable climate, such as coastal California. It is valued for its attractive spring blooms.
