= Ribes lehmannii =

Conservation status
- Vulnerable (IUCN 3.1)

Scientific classification
- Kingdom: Plantae
- Clade: Tracheophytes
- Clade: Angiosperms
- Clade: Eudicots
- Order: Saxifragales
- Family: Grossulariaceae
- Genus: Ribes
- Species: R. lehmannii

Binomial name
- Ribes lehmannii Jancz.

Species of flowering plant

Ribes lehmannii is a species of plant in the family Grossulariaceae. It is endemic to Ecuador. Its natural habitats are subtropical or tropical moist montane forest, subtropical or tropical high-altitude shrubland, and subtropical or tropical high-altitude grassland.
