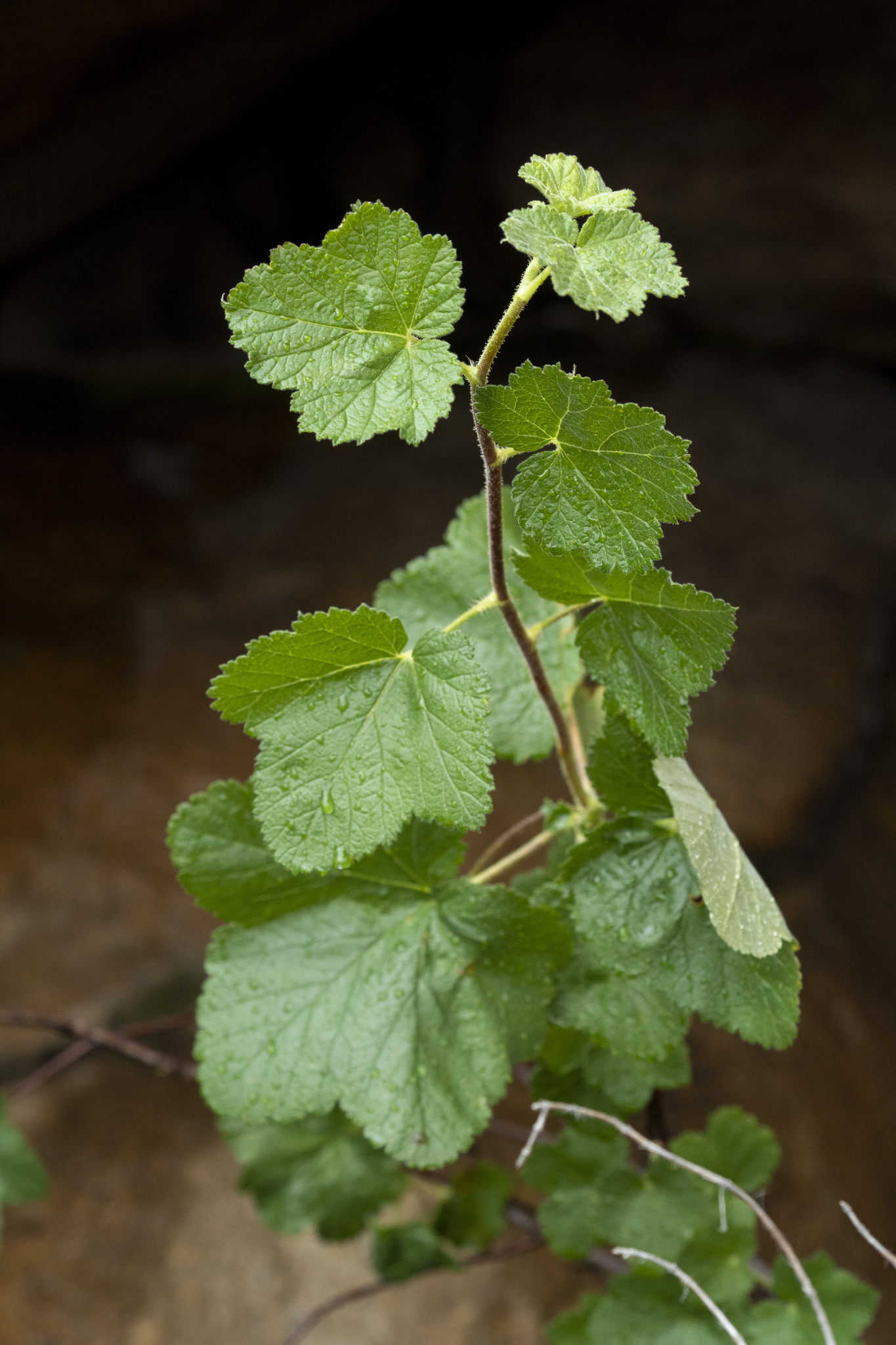
- The stem and leaves of the species

Conservation status
- Imperiled (NatureServe)

Scientific classification
- Kingdom: Plantae
- Clade: Tracheophytes
- Clade: Angiosperms
- Clade: Eudicots
- Order: Saxifragales
- Family: Grossulariaceae
- Genus: Ribes
- Species: R. canthariforme

Binomial name
- Ribes canthariforme Wiggins 1929

Synonyms
- Ribes canthariformis Wiggins

= Ribes canthariforme =

Moreno currant

Species of currant

Ribes canthariforme is a rare species of currant commonly known as the Moreno currant. It is characterized by pink to red flowers, a dense inflorescence, and a lack of nodal spines. A little-known endemic to the mountains of San Diego County, it is usually found growing the shade of massive boulders in the chaparral. Although the rarity and small numbers of this plant is a conservation concern, it is usually found in remote areas and is well hidden enough to be safe from most threats.

== Description ==
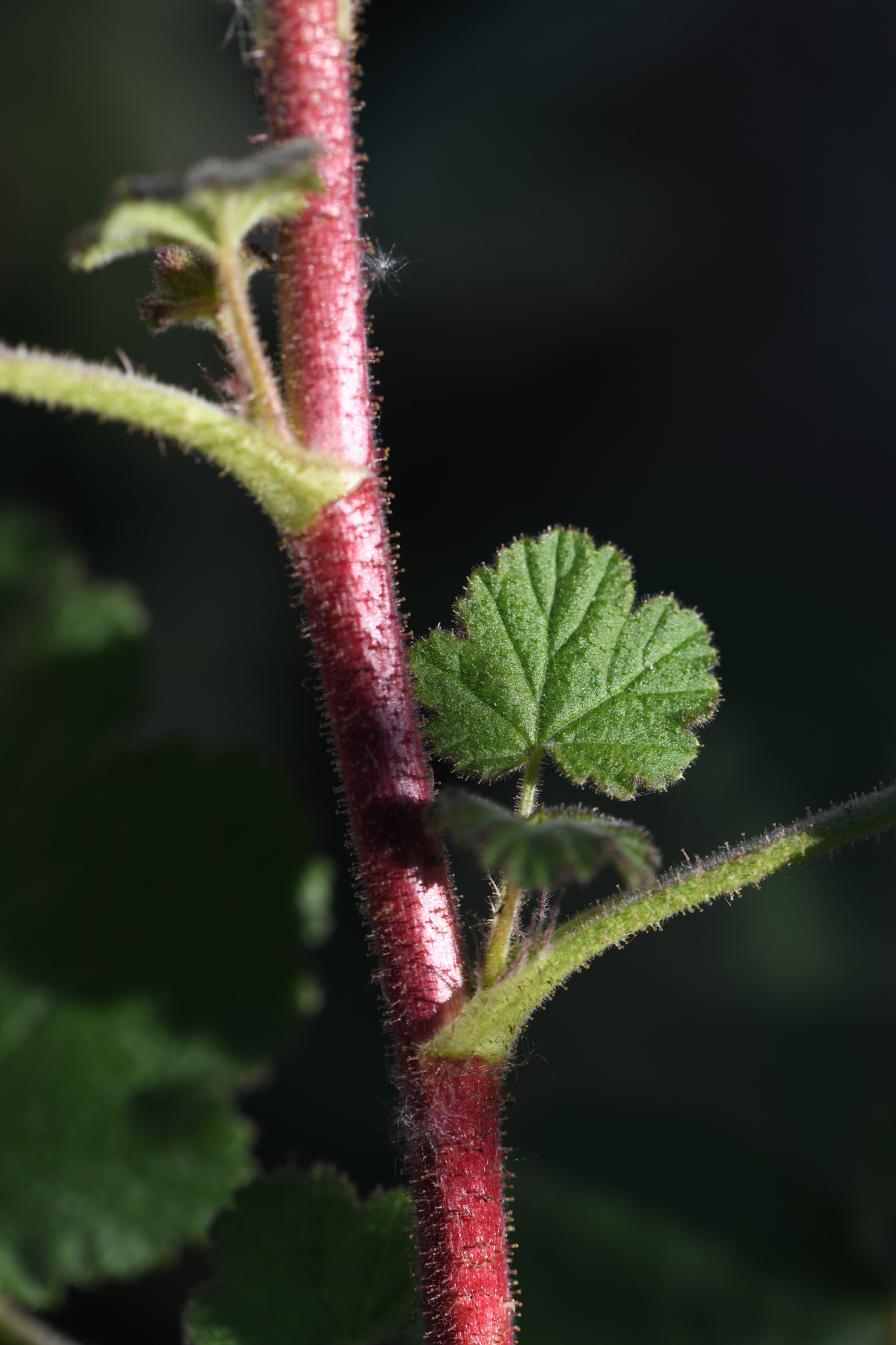
Detail of the stems and leaves.

Ribes canthariforme is a chaparral shrub that reaches to 2.5 m (8.2 ft) in the shadows of large boulders and sheltered places. The stems stand erect and are covered in a fine pubescence, and lack the notable spines and prickles on the nodes and internodes of other Ribes species. Three-lobed, round, and with shallow clefts, the leaves measure 4–6 cm (1.6–2.4 in) long. The upper surface of the leaf is green, and covered in wavy, long, soft hairs, while the lower surface is a gray-green, and covered in dense hairs. The base of the leaf is cordate, and attaches to pubescent petioles 2.5–3.5 cm (0.98–1.38 in) long. The leaf margins are crenate, and have gland-tipped teeth.

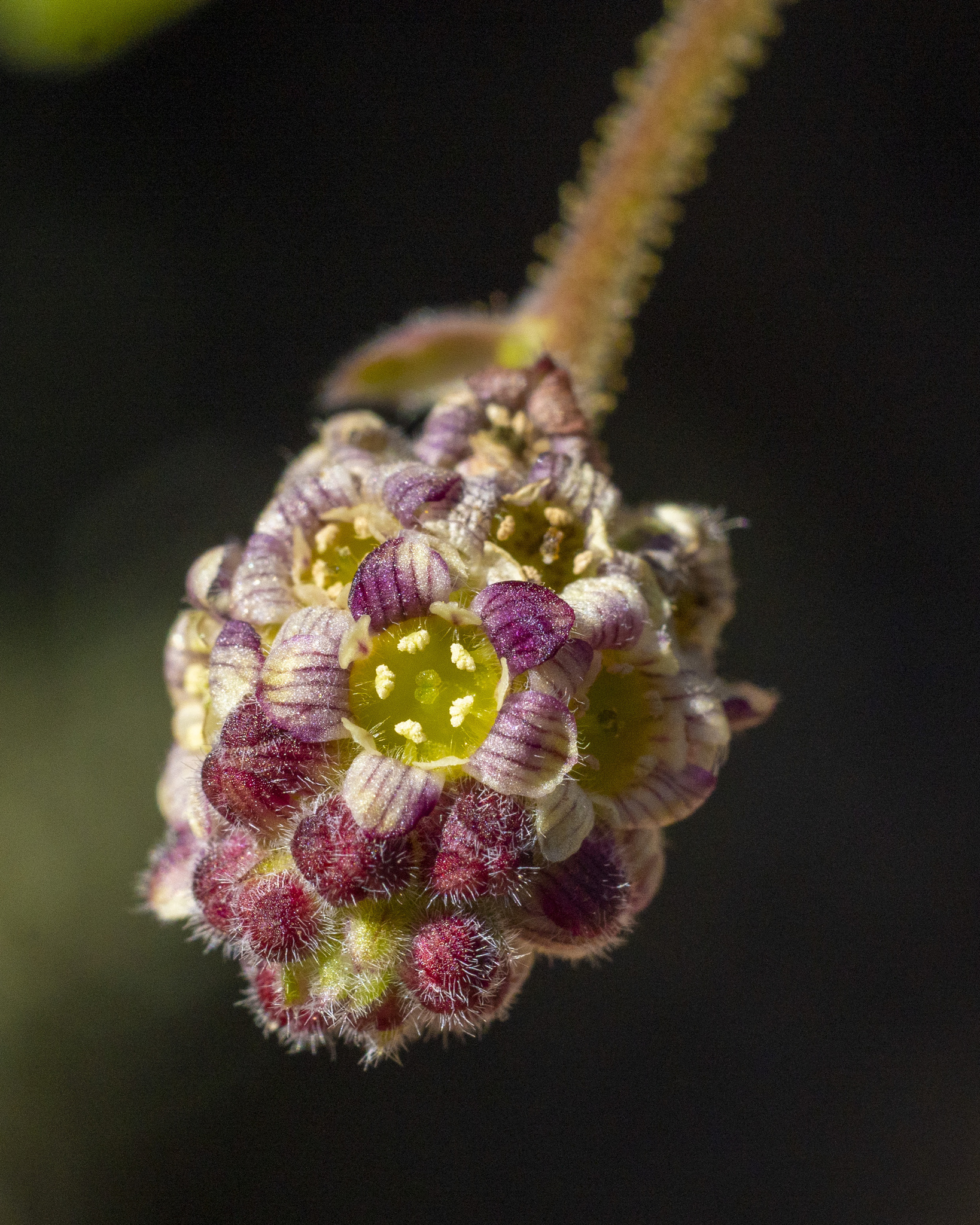
The inflorescence and flowers of R. canthariforme.

Flowers are produced from February to April. The inflorescence is a dense, drooping, spike or head-like structure, with the flowers crowded into the distal third. The individual flowers are attached to the inflorescence by jointed pedicels 1–2 mm (0.039–0.079 in) long, covered in white-villous hairs. The lanceolate bracts measure 2–4 mm (0.079–0.157 in) long and are likewise covered in white villi. The flower is colored a rose-purple to pale rose-purple. The hypanthium is broadly urn-shaped, wider than it is long, and covered in villous-pubescent and gland-tipped hairs. The sepals are spreading, spoon-shaped, 2 mm (0.079 in) long, and covered in dark veins. The petals are nearly connivent and erect, and measure 1 mm (0.039 in) long. The styles are free, their bases sparsely hairy.

The fruit is a round purple berry, measuring 5–6 mm (0.20–0.24 in), and covered in long, soft, wavy or glandular hairs that disappear in age.

== Distribution and habitat ==
=== Distribution ===
Ribes canthariforme is endemic to the western Peninsular Ranges of San Diego County, California. Localities include Barona Valley, El Cajon Mountain, Descanso Junction, Lyons Peak, Corte Madera, and next to Morena Dam, where the type specimen was collected on a northeast-facing slope among rocks and boulders. The range of this plant does not correspond closely to other species in the region that are restricted to similar habitats, and the distinctive appearance lacks any superficial similarity to other local Ribes species, suggesting a relictual component to its distribution.

There is one herbarium record of this species from the Santa Ana Mountains in Orange County. A record of this species from the San Jacinto Mountains in Riverside County was incorrectly identified and later determined to be Ribes malvaceum var. viridifolium. Although the range of this species comes close to the Mexico–United States border, it has not been located in Baja California.

Reiser (2001) suggested the aesthetic appeal of Ribes canthariforme may make it an attractive ornamental plant. Plants of this species collected at the type locality (Moreno Dam) have been successfully cultivated at the Botanical Garden of Tilden Regional Park.

=== Habitat ===
Ribes canthariforme grows in chaparral habitats in areas of acid igneous rockland. R. canthariforme is usually hidden from the rest of the chaparral vegetation as it usually grows in the shaded sides of large exposed boulders, although some may be found away from the boulders in other sheltered places. The association this species has with large boulders, rocky ravines and sheltered areas is probably because of the water harvesting benefits and extra moisture produced by the shade.

Estimates from 2005 indicated that about 70 individual plants remained. Most of these occur on land within Cleveland National Forest, and since there are few serious threats the species is not otherwise specifically protected.

== See also ==
- California chaparral and woodlands
