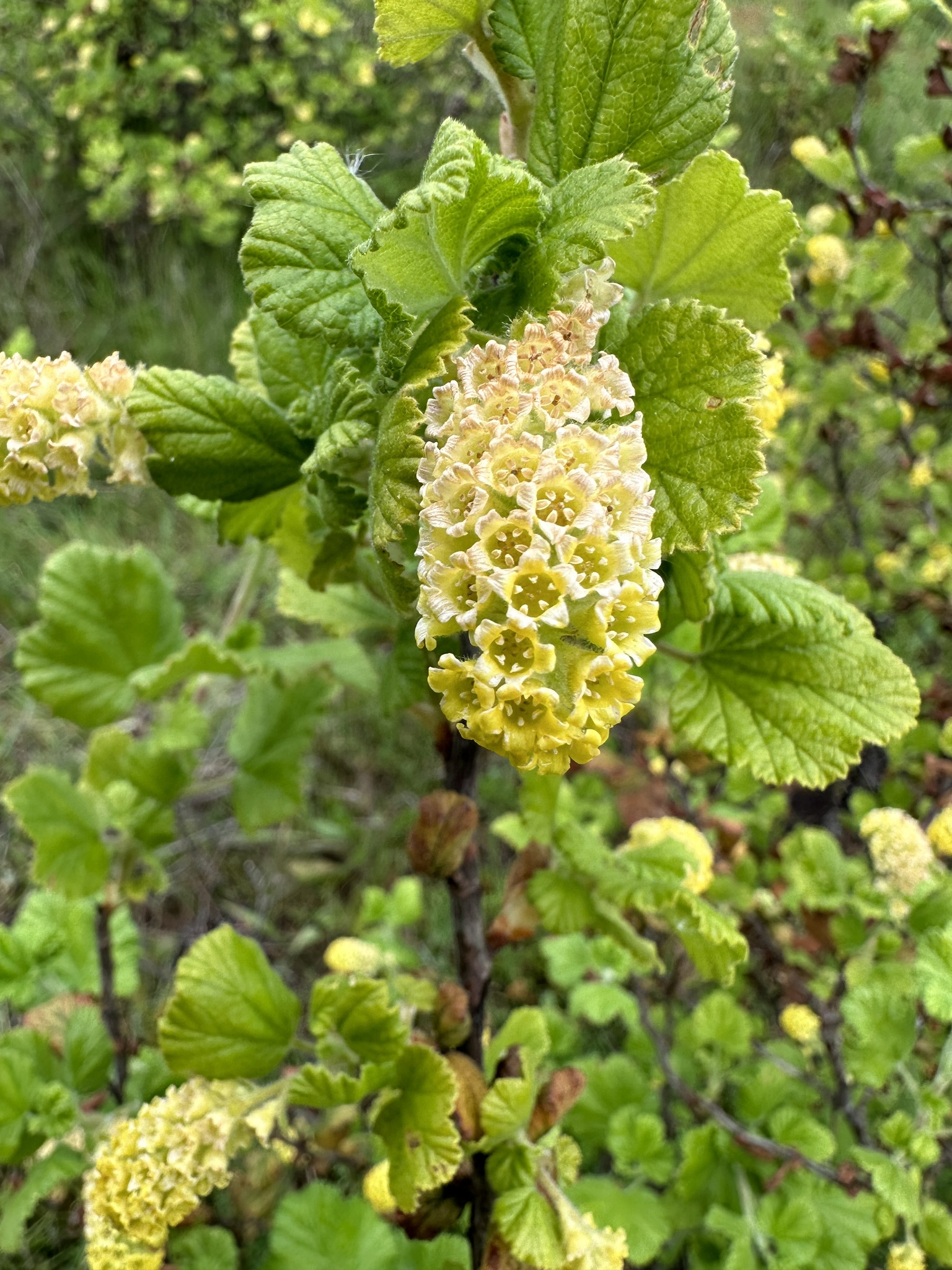

Scientific classification
- Kingdom: Plantae
- Clade: Tracheophytes
- Clade: Angiosperms
- Clade: Eudicots
- Order: Saxifragales
- Family: Grossulariaceae
- Genus: Ribes
- Species: R. trilobum

Binomial name
- Ribes trilobum Meyen

= Ribes trilobum =

Species of plant

Ribes trilobum, commonly known as parrilla and muhul, is a species of flowering plant in the family Grossulariaceae. It is endemic to central and southern Chile. It is one of the nine species in the genus Ribes that are native to Chile, and one of the four Ribes species endemic to Chile alongside Ribes bicolor, Ribes integrifolium and Ribes nemorosum.
