= Ribes lasianthum =

Alpine gooseberry

Scientific classification
- Kingdom: Plantae
- Clade: Tracheophytes
- Clade: Angiosperms
- Clade: Eudicots
- Order: Saxifragales
- Family: Grossulariaceae
- Genus: Ribes
- Species: R. lasianthum

Binomial name
- Ribes lasianthum Greene 1896

Synonyms
- Ribes lasianthum var. lasianthum (Greene) Jeps.; Ribes lasianthum subsp. lasianthum (Greene) A.E.Murray; Grossularia lasiantha (Greene) Coville & Britton

Species of flowering plant

Ribes lasianthum is a species of currant known by the common names alpine gooseberry and woolly-flowered gooseberry. It is native to California, where it can be found in the San Gabriel Mountains and the Sierra Nevada, its distribution extending just into Nevada.

Ribes lasianthum grows in high mountain habitat, often in open areas. It is a spreading shrub growing one half to one meter (20-40 inches) in height. It has fuzzy, prickly stems, the nodes bearing spines up to a centimeter long. The hairy, glandular leaves are one to two centimeters long and divided into toothed lobes. The inflorescence is an erect raceme of two to four flowers, each less than a centimeters long. The flower has five yellow sepals which are reflexed away from the central corolla, a neat tube of yellow petals. Within the tube are five stamens and two styles. The fruit is a hairless red berry measuring 6 to 7 millimeters wide.
