= Ribes victoris =

Victor's gooseberry

Scientific classification
- Kingdom: Plantae
- Clade: Tracheophytes
- Clade: Angiosperms
- Clade: Eudicots
- Order: Saxifragales
- Family: Grossulariaceae
- Genus: Ribes
- Species: R. victoris

Binomial name
- Ribes victoris Greene 1888

Synonyms
- Grossularia victoris (Greene) Coville & Britton; Ribes menziesii forma victoris (Greene) Hoover; Ribes menziesii var. victoris (Greene) Jancz.; Ribes greeneianum A. Heller

Species of flowering plant

Ribes victoris is an uncommon North American species of currant known by the common name Victor's gooseberry. It is endemic to California, where it grows in the chaparral and woods of canyons in the San Francisco Bay Area and counties to the north, as far as Humboldt County.

Ribes victoris is an erect shrub growing up to two meters (80 inches) in height, its stem coated in sticky glandular hairs and some bristles, with spines occurring at nodes. The hairy, glandular leaves are divided into a few lobes which are lined with teeth. The inflorescence is made up of one or two flowers hanging from the branches. Each flower has five reflexed sepals which are white with a pink blush at the bases around a central corolla of white petals. The whitish stamens and stigmas protrude from the center. The fruit is a yellow berry about a centimeter wide which is covered in glandular bristles.
