= Ribes marshallii =

Scientific classification
- Kingdom: Plantae
- Clade: Tracheophytes
- Clade: Angiosperms
- Clade: Eudicots
- Order: Saxifragales
- Family: Grossulariaceae
- Genus: Ribes
- Species: R. marshallii

Binomial name
- Ribes marshallii Greene 1887

Synonyms
- Grossularia marshallii (Greene) Coville & Britton

Species of flowering plant

Ribes marshallii is a North American species of currant known by the common names Hupa gooseberry and Marshall's gooseberry. It is endemic to the Pacific Northwest's Klamath Mountains.

It is a shrub growing up to 2 metres (6 1/2 ft) tall. It produces arching stems 1 to 2 metres (3 1/2 to 6 1/2 ft) long which may root at the tip when it reaches moist substrate. Nodes on the stem bear three spines each up to 1 centimetre (3/8 in) long. The lightly hairy leaves are roughly 1–3 cm (1/2–1 1/4 in) across and divided into 3–5 widely toothed lobes. Glandular hairs occur on veins and leaf margins.

The inflorescence is a solitary flower or raceme of up to three flowers which hang pendent from the branches from leaf axils. The small, showy flower has five pointed purple-red sepals which are reflexed upward. At the center is a tubular corolla of bright yellow petals from which emerge five stamens and two thin, mostly fused styles. The fruit is a prickly oblong berry up to 2 cm long which ripens to dark red. The fruits are of unknown edibility.

== Distribution and habitat ==
Ribes marshallii is endemic to the Klamath Mountains of southern Oregon and northern California. It grows in montane to subalpine coniferous forests.
