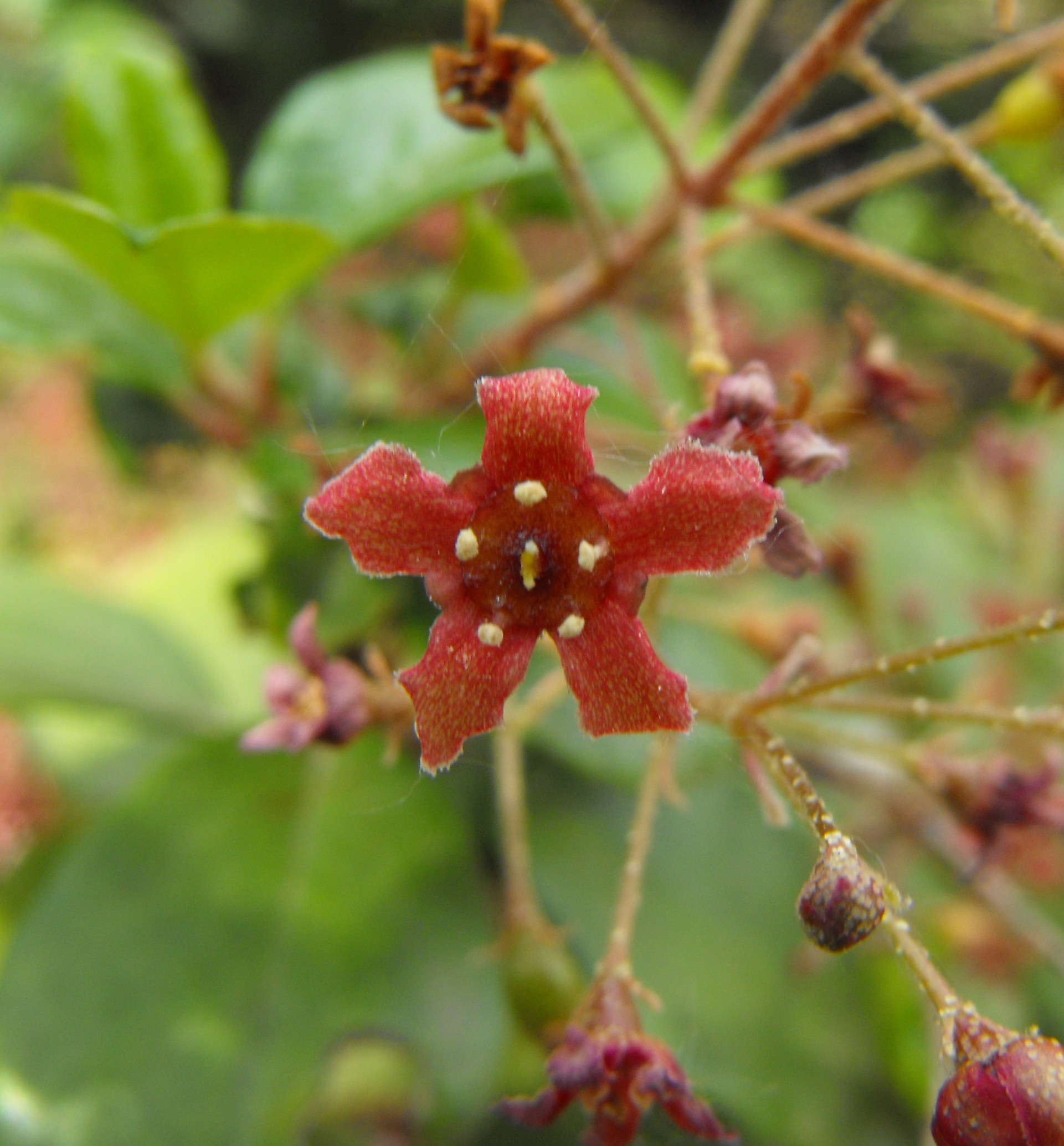

Conservation status
- Imperiled (NatureServe)

Scientific classification
- Kingdom: Plantae
- Clade: Tracheophytes
- Clade: Angiosperms
- Clade: Eudicots
- Order: Saxifragales
- Family: Grossulariaceae
- Genus: Ribes
- Species: R. viburnifolium

Binomial name
- Ribes viburnifolium Gray 1882

= Ribes viburnifolium =

Species of flowering plant

Ribes viburnifolium, is an uncommon North American species in the gooseberry family. It is known by the common names Catalina currant, Santa Catalina Island currant, island gooseberry and evergreen currant.

== Description ==
Ribes viburnifolium is a perennial shrub which grows low to the ground, extending long reddish stems horizontally. The leaves are dark green and shiny on their top surfaces, and lighter green or yellowish and leathery on the undersides. The leaves have glands which exude a sticky, citrus-scented sap.

Clusters of deep red flowers bloom in late winter and into early spring. The plant yields small red fruits later in the spring. The red fruit attracts birds. The flowers attract hummingbirds and insects.

== Distribution and habitat ==
=== Distribution ===
Ribes viburnifolium is native to the coast of Baja California and Southern California, from Smuggler's Canyon in the Tijuana Hills of San Diego County to El Rosario in central Baja California. The probable type locality is near Ensenada, from a 1882 collection by Marcus E. Jones. R. viburnifolium is also present on several islands in the region, including Catalina Island and Todos Santos in the Southern California Bight, and Cedros Island farther to the south off of the Vizcaino Peninsula. A persistent population from a planting exists in San Clemente Canyon, San Diego County.

=== Habitat ===
The mainland habitat of Ribes viburnifolium along the southern San Diego and northern Baja California coast consists of coastal sage scrub and coastal succulent scrub, with plants growing in canyons and arroyos with partial shade near the coast. On the Punta Banda, R. viburnifolium is found growing in moist, wind-swept, and foggy sage scrub and chaparral. On Cedros Island, this species is found in the pine groves north of the Gran Cañón.

== Cultivation ==
'Evergreen currant' has become a popular plant in drought-tolerant gardens.
