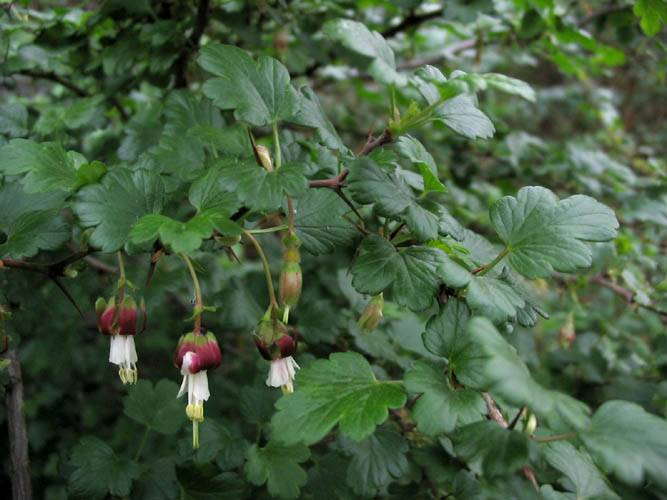

Scientific classification
- Kingdom: Plantae
- Clade: Tracheophytes
- Clade: Angiosperms
- Clade: Eudicots
- Order: Saxifragales
- Family: Grossulariaceae
- Genus: Ribes
- Species: R. californicum

Binomial name
- Ribes californicum Hook. & Arn. 1839

Synonyms: Ribes oligacanthum Eastw.
- Grossularia californica Coville & Britton; Ribes hesperium McClatchie

= Ribes californicum =

Species of flowering plant

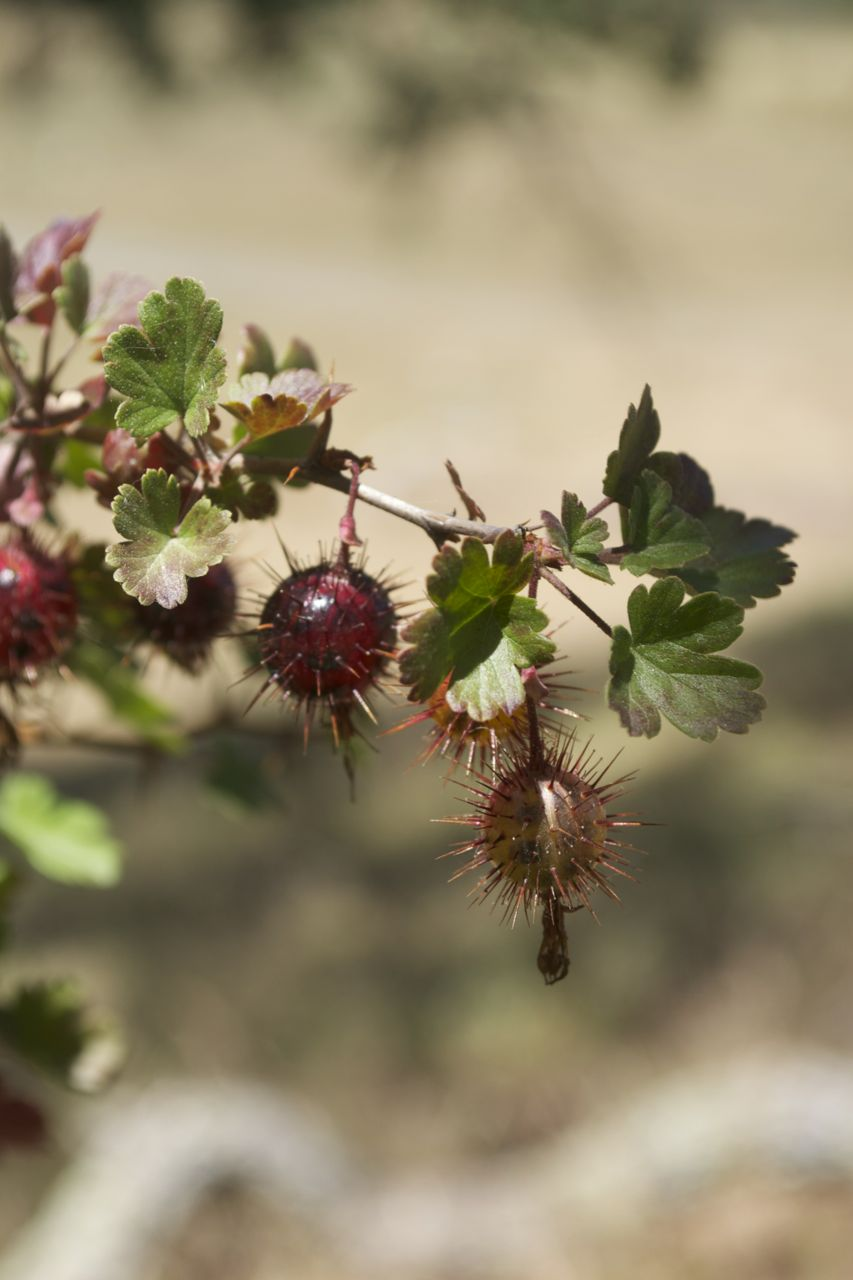
Ribes californicum

Ribes californicum, with the common name hillside gooseberry, is a North American species of currant. It is endemic to California.

== Description ==
Ribes californicum is a mostly erect shrub growing to a maximum height around 1.4 metres (4 1/2 ft). Nodes along the stem each bear three spines up to 1.5 centimetres (5/8 in) in length. The hairy to hairless leaves are 1–3 cm (3/8–1 1/8 in) long and divided into 3–5 cm (1 1/8–2 in) oblong, toothed lobes.

The inflorescence is a solitary flower or raceme of up to three flowers which hang pendent from the branches. The flower has five sepals in shades of deep red or green with a red tinge, which are reflexed upward. At the center is a tubular corolla of white or pinkish petals around five stamens and two longer styles.

The fruit is an edible red berry about 1 cm wide which is covered in stiff spines.

== Varieties ==
- Ribes californicum var. californicum - mostly Coast Ranges from Ventura County to Mendocino County, with additional populations in Orange County
- Ribes californicum var. hesperium - primarily San Gabriel Mountains in Southern California

== Distribution and habitat ==
It is endemic to California, where it can be found throughout many of the California Coast, Transverse, and Peninsular Ranges in local habitat types such as chaparral and woodlands.
