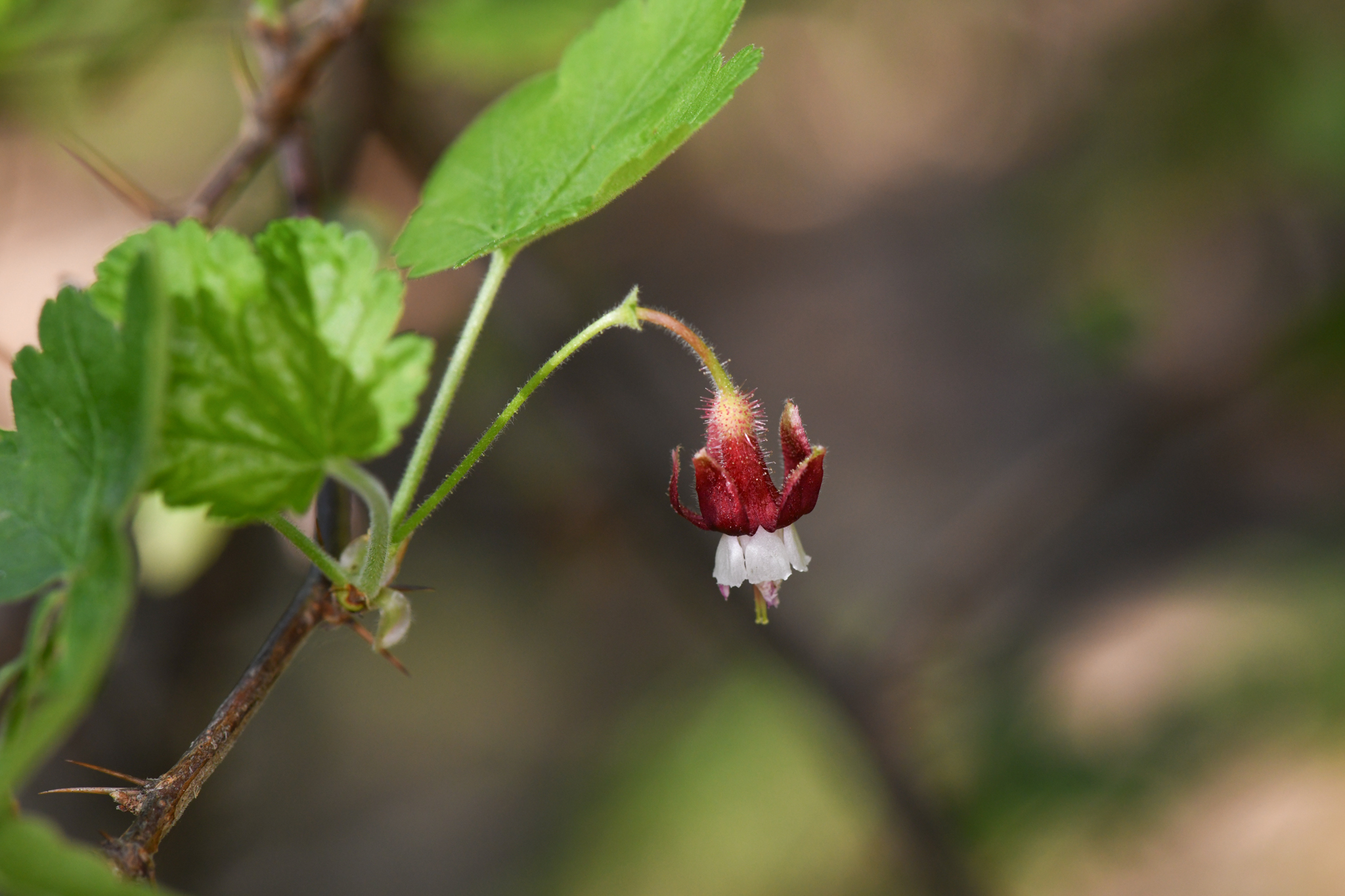

Scientific classification
- Kingdom: Plantae
- Clade: Tracheophytes
- Clade: Angiosperms
- Clade: Eudicots
- Order: Saxifragales
- Family: Grossulariaceae
- Genus: Ribes
- Species: R. amarum

Binomial name
- Ribes amarum McClatchie 1894

Synonyms
- Ribes amarum var. hoffmannii Munz; Ribes mariposanum Congdon; Grossularia amara (McClatchie) Coville & Britton

= Ribes amarum =

Species of flowering plant

Ribes amarum is a species of currant known by the common name bitter gooseberry. It is endemic to California, where it is known from mountains, foothills, and canyons. Its habitat includes Chaparral.

== Description ==
Ribes amarum is a shrub growing to one to two meters (40-80 inches) in height. Nodes along the stem each bear three spines up to a centimeter (0.4 inch) in length. The hairy, glandular leaves are 2 to 4 centimeters (0.8-1.6 inches) long and generally rounded in shape, divided into 3 to 5 rounded toothed lobes.

The inflorescence is a solitary flower or raceme of up to three flowers which hang from leaf axils. The showy flower has five pointed sepals in shades of purple-red which are reflexed upward. At the center is a tubular corolla of white or pink-tinged petals around five stamens and two styles. The fruit is a bristly berry up to 2 centimeters wide which is bright red, ripening purple.
