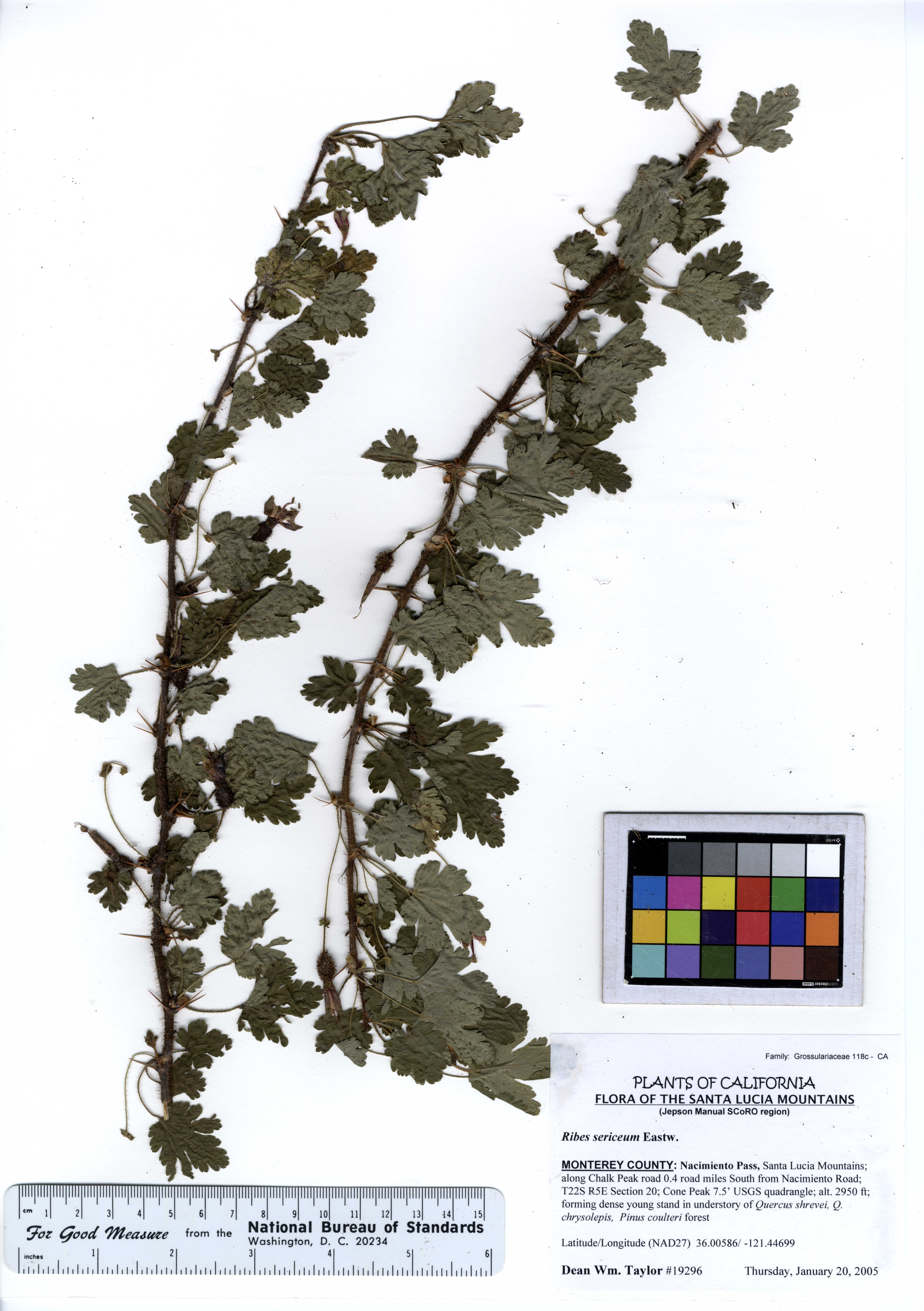

Scientific classification
- Kingdom: Plantae
- Clade: Tracheophytes
- Clade: Angiosperms
- Clade: Eudicots
- Order: Saxifragales
- Family: Grossulariaceae
- Genus: Ribes
- Species: R. sericeum

Binomial name
- Ribes sericeum Eastw.

Synonyms
- Grossularia sericea (Eastw.) Coville & Britton

= Ribes sericeum =

Species of flowering plant

Ribes sericeum is a species of currant known by the common name Lucia gooseberry, or Santa Lucia gooseberry; its Latin epithet of sericeum means "of silk". It is endemic to California, where it is known only from the Santa Lucia Mountains along the Central Coast and an additional isolated population in Santa Barbara County.

Ribes sericeum grows on streambanks in forests and scrub habitat. It is an erect shrub growing one to two meters (40-80 inches) tall, its stems densely hairy and covered in prickles and glandular bristles. Nodes along the stem bear three spines each which may be over a centimeter (0.4 inch) long. The leaves are up to 4 centimeters (1.6 inches) long and are divided into several lobes with toothed edges. The leaves are hairy and glandular, especially on the undersides. The inflorescence is a solitary flower or a raceme of 2 or 3 flowers. Each flower has five reflexed green, red-tinged or red sepals around a tube-shaped ring of smaller whitish petals. The fruit is a purple berry up to 2.5 centimeters (1 inch) long which is covered in bristles.
