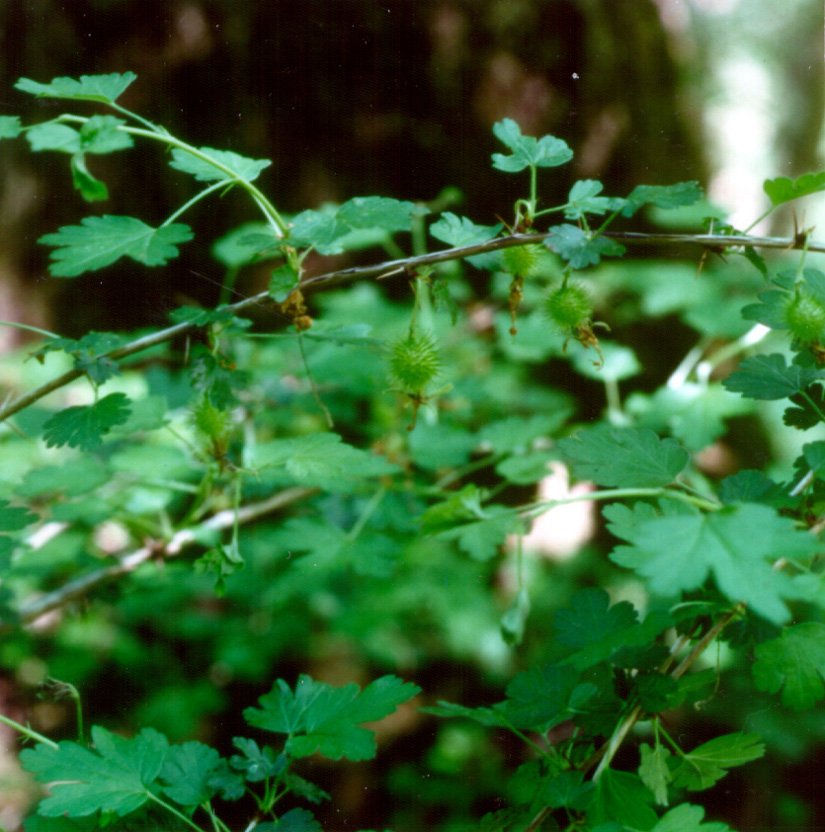

Conservation status
- Critically Imperiled (NatureServe)

Scientific classification
- Kingdom: Plantae
- Clade: Tracheophytes
- Clade: Angiosperms
- Clade: Eudicots
- Order: Saxifragales
- Family: Grossulariaceae
- Genus: Ribes
- Species: R. echinellum

Binomial name
- Ribes echinellum (Coville) Rehder 1926

Synonyms
- Grossularia echinella Coville 1924

= Ribes echinellum =

Species of shrub

Ribes echinellum, the Miccosukee gooseberry, is a very rare North American shrub in the currant family, native to the southeastern United States. It has only a few known populations. The Florida populations were discovered first, in 1924 at Lake Miccosukee. The South Carolina populations were found in 1957 and 1981, and the first is protected at Steven's Creek Heritage Preserve.

Ribes echinellum is a shrub up to 150 cm (5 feet) tall with spines at the nodes (places where the leaves are attached to the stem). Leaves are round or egg-shaped with three lobes. It has whitish or pale yellow flowers and purple spine-covered berries.

== Cultivation ==
Ribes echinellum is cultivated in a few places outside its native areas, as far south as Hudson, Florida, but does not reproduce there.

It is most abundant in the shade of deciduous trees on moist but well-drained soils with pH of 6.7 to 7.4.
