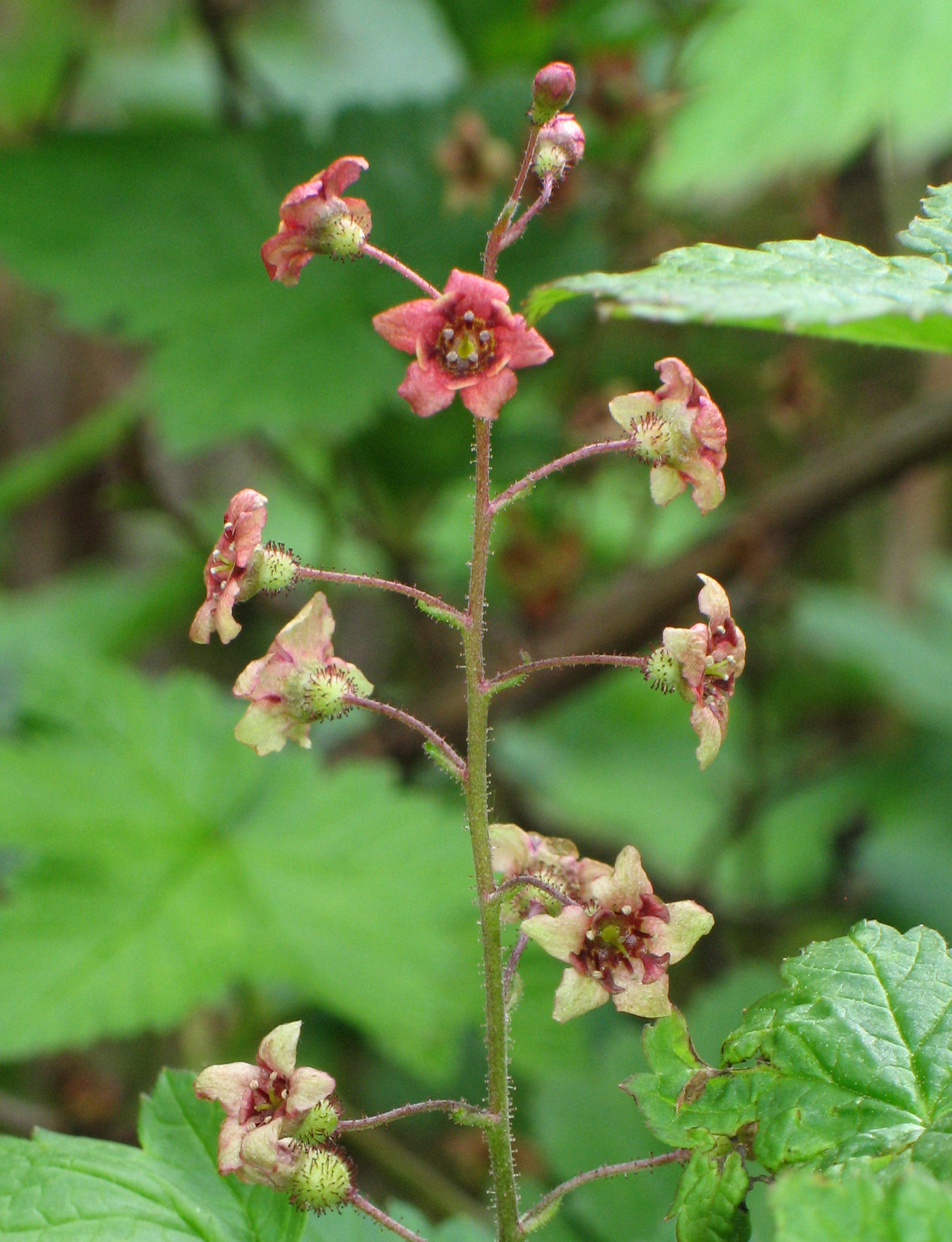
- R. laxiflorum specimen from Joffre Lakes Provincial Park, British Columbia

Conservation status
- Secure (NatureServe)

Scientific classification
- Kingdom: Plantae
- Clade: Tracheophytes
- Clade: Angiosperms
- Clade: Eudicots
- Order: Saxifragales
- Family: Grossulariaceae
- Genus: Ribes
- Species: R. laxiflorum

Binomial name
- Ribes laxiflorum Pursh 1813

Synonyms
- Ribes affine Douglas ex Bong. Ribes coloradense Coville Ribes altamirani Jancz.

= Ribes laxiflorum =

Species of currant

Ribes laxiflorum is a species of currant known by the common names trailing black currant, and spreading currant. It is native to western North America.

== Description ==
Ribes laxiflorum is a spreading, trailing shrub usually growing .5–1 metre (1 1/2–3 1/2 feet) in height. It has been known to take a somewhat vine-like form in appropriate shady habitat with nearby supports, climbing to 7 m (23 ft) in length. It has fuzzy, glandular stems lacking spines and prickles. The hairy, green leaves are up to 10 centimetres (4 inches) wide, divided into 5–7 lobes lined with dull teeth; the undersurfaces are glandular.

The inflorescence is a mostly erect raceme of up to eight flowers. The distinctive flower has five greenish, purplish, or red sepals which are often curved back at the tips. At the center is a corolla of five red or pink petals each measuring 1 millimetre (1/32 in) long, narrow at the base and wider or club-shaped at the tip. Inside the corolla are five red stamens tipped with whitish anthers. The fruit is a purple-black berry measuring 4–14 mm (3/16–9/16 in) wide which is waxy, hairy, or bristly in texture.

== Distribution and habitat ==
It is native to western North America from Alaska and Yukon south as far as northern California and New Mexico; it has also been found in Siberia. Its habitat includes moist mountain forests, clearings, streambanks, and the borders of mountain roads.

== Uses ==
The berries are considered unpalatable raw but are eaten locally (variously fresh, boiled, or as preserves) by Bella Coola, Haisla, Hanaksiala, Hesquiat, Kwakiutl, Lummi, Makah, Oweekeno, Skagit, and Tanana peoples.

Other traditions use R. laxiflorum for an infusion to make an eyewash (roots and or branches, by the Bella Coolah).

Decoctions of: bark to remedy tuberculosis (with the roots, by the Skokomish); or for the common cold (Skagit): leaves and twigs, as a general tonic (Lummi).

Woody stems are fashioned into pipe stems (Hesquiat).
