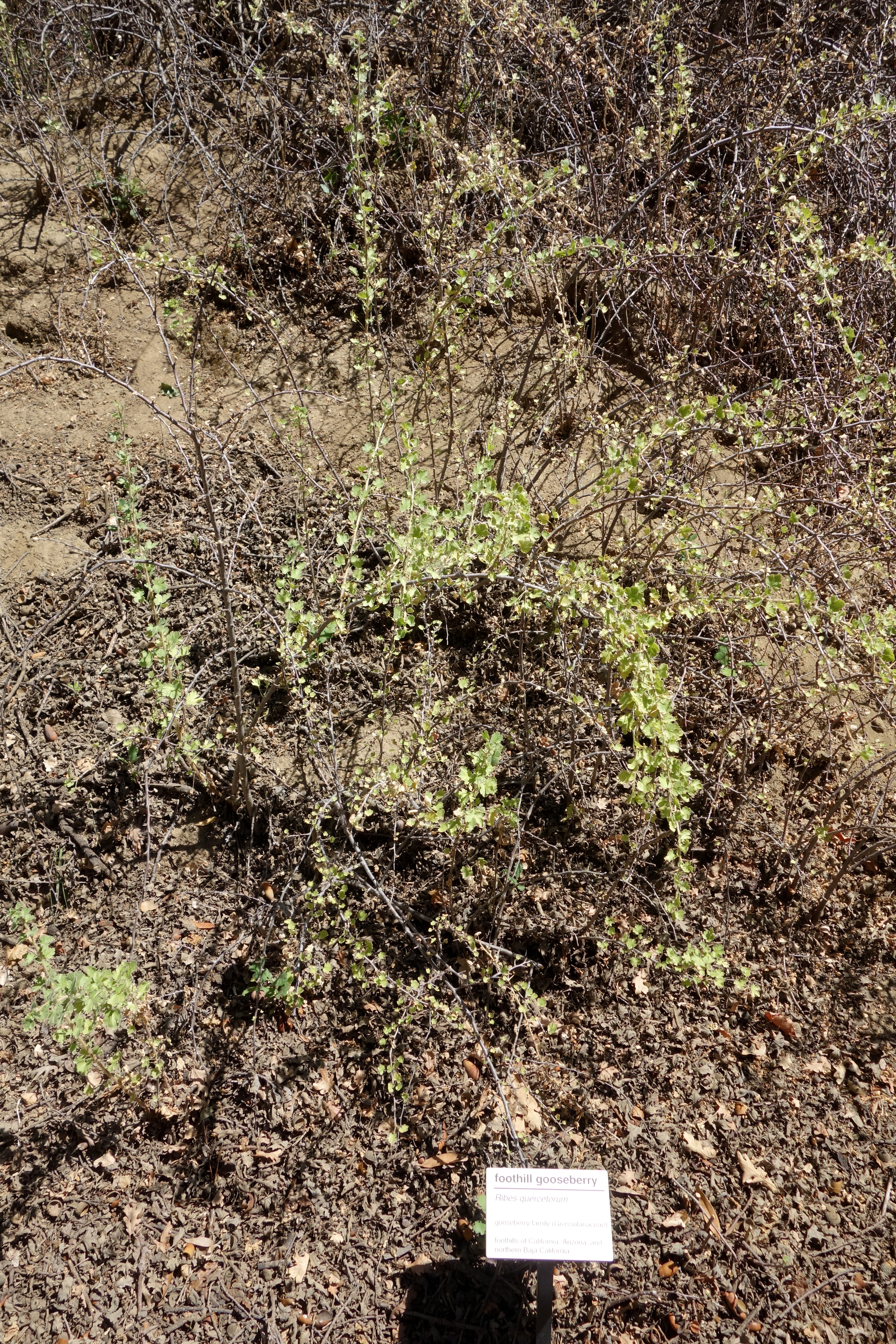

Scientific classification
- Kingdom: Plantae
- Clade: Tracheophytes
- Clade: Angiosperms
- Clade: Eudicots
- Order: Saxifragales
- Family: Grossulariaceae
- Genus: Ribes
- Species: R. quercetorum

Binomial name
- Ribes quercetorum Greene 1885

Synonyms
- Grossularia quercetorum (Greene) Coville & Britton; Ribes leptanthum var. quercetorum (Greene) Jancz.

= Ribes quercetorum =

Species of flowering plant

Ribes quercetorum is a species of currant known by the common names rock gooseberry, oak gooseberry and oakwoods gooseberry. It is native to the mountains and hills of California from the San Francisco Bay Area south into Baja California and east into Arizona.

Ribes quercetorum grows in woodlands, chaparral, and dry desert slopes and canyons. It is a spreading shrub producing arching stems up to 1.5 meters (5 feet) long, the nodes along the stems bearing 1 to 3 spines each up to 1.5 centimeters (0.6 inch) long. The lightly hairy, glandular leaves are up to 3 centimeters (1.2 inches) long and are divided into a few lobes which are toothed or lobed at their tips. The inflorescence is a raceme of 2 or 3 small flowers. Each flower has five reflexed yellow sepals around a tube-shaped ring of smaller cream-colored petals. The fruit is a spherical, edible black berry just under a centimeter (0.4 inch) in diameter.
