= Gooseberry =

Species of Ribes cultivated for its edible fruit

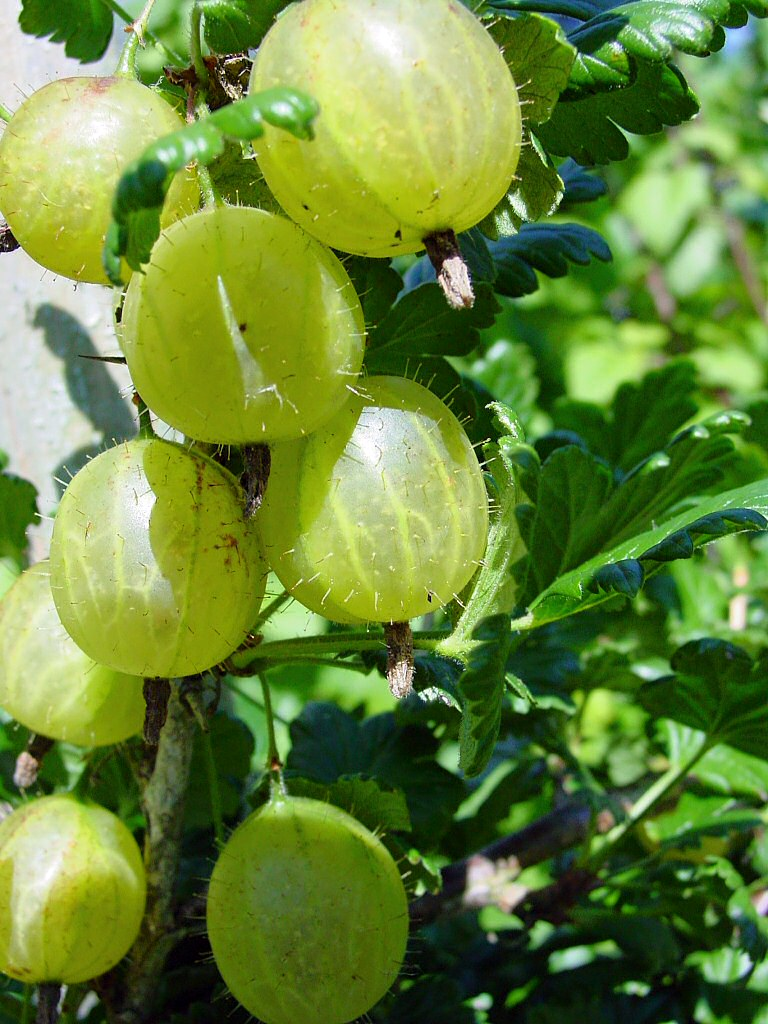
Green gooseberries

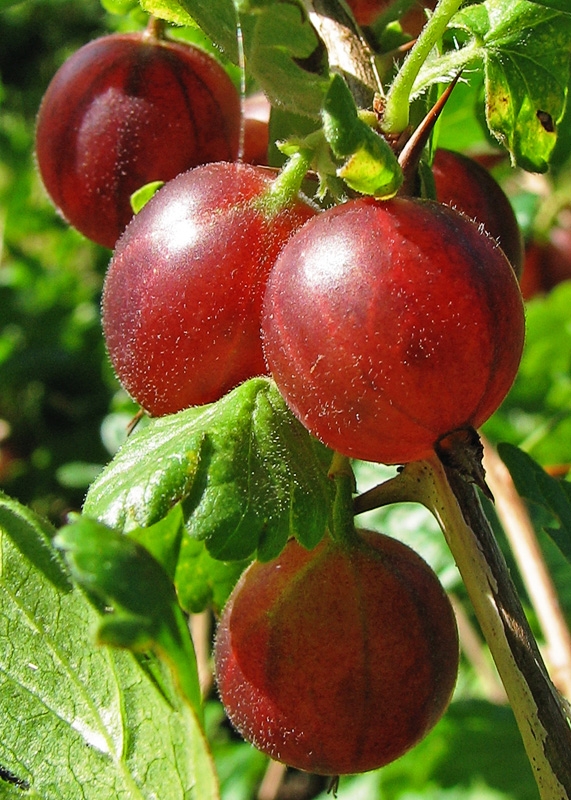
Red berries of Ribes uva-crispa

Gooseberry (US and northern UK: /ˈɡuːsbɛri/ GOOSS-berr-ee or /ˈɡuːzbɛri/ GOOZ-berr-ee, southern UK: /ˈɡʊzbəri/ GUUZ-bər-ee) is a common name for many species of Ribes (which also includes currants), as well as a large number of plants of similar appearance, and also several unrelated plants. The term gooseberry has a debated etymology.

The berries of those in the genus Ribes are edible and may be green, orange, red, purple, yellow, white, or black. Black bears, birds, and small mammals eat the berries, while game animals, coyotes, foxes and raccoons browse the foliage. The bushes are hosts to various insect species, including the magpie moth and the comma butterfly.

William Turner described the gooseberry in his Herball, written about the middle of the 16th century. Improved varieties were probably first raised by the gardeners of Holland. The gooseberry was more populous in North America before it was discovered that it carries blister rust, deadly to certain pines, resulting in its removal from forest areas.

Humans cultivate gooseberries as insect habitats or directly for the sweet fruits. Numerous cultivars have been developed for both commercial and domestic use. Gooseberries are edible and can be eaten raw, or cooked as an ingredient in desserts, such as pies, fools and crumbles. Early pickings are generally sour and more appropriate for culinary use. Raw gooseberries are 88% water, 10% carbohydrates, and 1% each of fat and protein.

== Etymology ==
The goose in gooseberry has been mistakenly seen as a corruption of either the Dutch word kruisbes or the allied German Krausbeere, or of the earlier forms of the French groseille. Alternatively, the word has been connected to the Middle High German krus ('curl, crisped'), in Latin as grossularia.

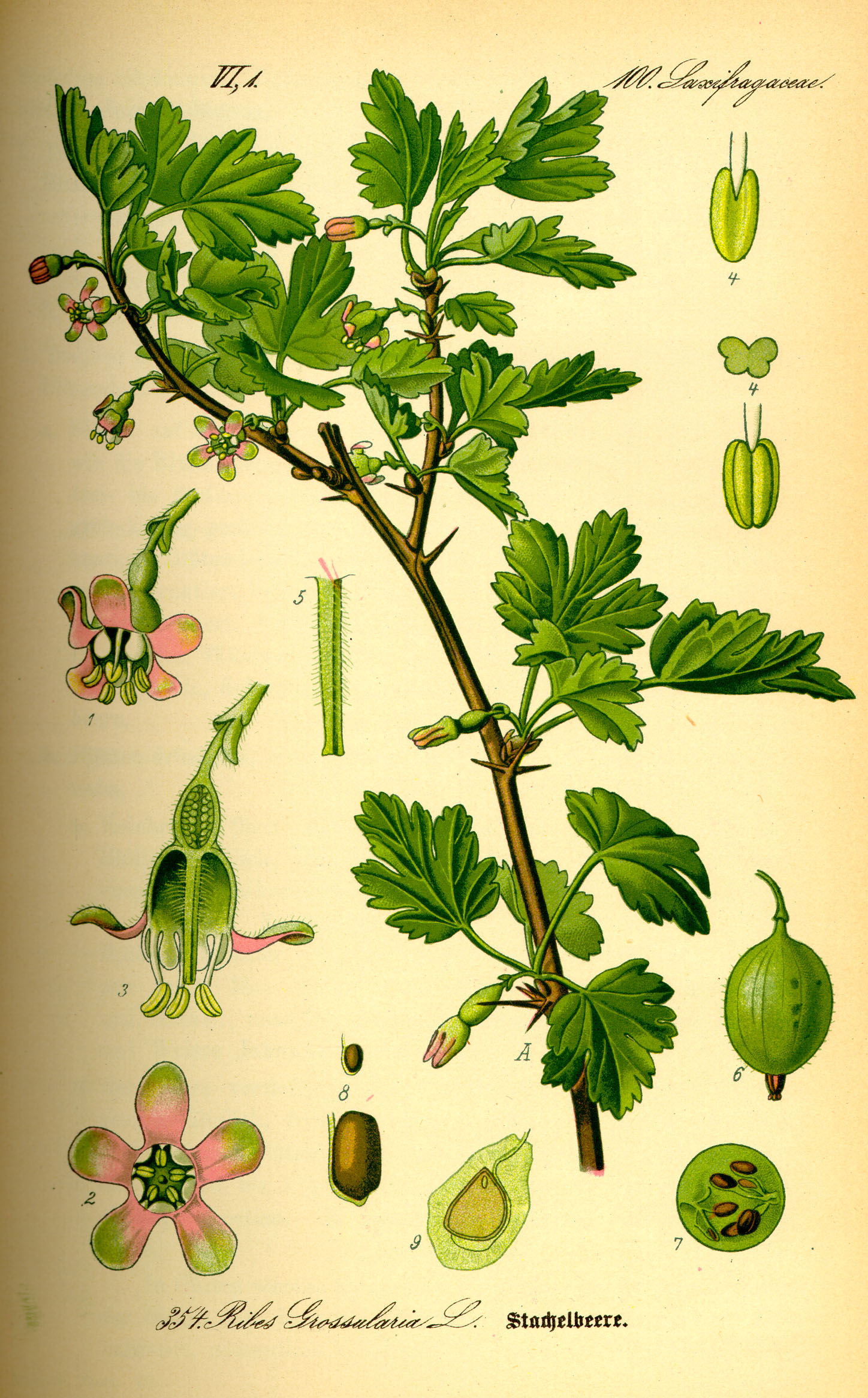
Ribes uva-crispa by Otto Wilhelm Thomé (1885), showing the distinctive curl of the flower petals

However, the Oxford English Dictionary takes the more literal derivation from goose and berry as probable because "the grounds on which plants and fruits have received names associating them with animals are so often inexplicable that the inappropriateness in the meaning does not necessarily give good grounds for believing that the word is an etymological corruption". The French for gooseberry is groseille à maquereau, translated as 'mackerel berries', due to their use in a sauce for mackerel in old French cuisine. The word first appears in written English in the 16th century. In Britain, gooseberries may informally be called goosegogs.

Gooseberry bush was 19th-century slang for pubic hair, and from this comes the saying that babies are "born under a gooseberry bush".

== Ecology ==
Ribes uva-crispa, blossoming in Latvia

The berries of plants in the genus Ribes (sometimes placed in the genus Grossularia) are edible and may be green, orange, red, purple, yellow, white, or black. Black bears, various birds and small mammals eat the berries, while game animals, coyotes, foxes and raccoons browse the foliage.

Gooseberry bushes (Ribes) are hosts to magpie moth (Abraxas grossulariata) caterpillars. Gooseberry plants are also a preferred host plant for comma butterfly (Polygonia c-album), whose larvae frequently feed upon the plant during the development stage, v-moth (Macaria wauaria), and gooseberry sawfly (Nematus ribesii). Nematus ribesii grubs will bury themselves in the ground to pupate; on hatching into adult form, they lay their eggs, which hatch into larvae on the underside of gooseberry leaves.

Gooseberries, like other members of genus Ribes, are banned or restricted in several states of the United States because they are secondary (telial) hosts for white pine blister rust.

== Cultivation ==
=== In history ===
William Turner described the gooseberry in his Herball, written about the middle of the 16th century, and a few years later it is mentioned in one of Thomas Tusser's quaint rhymes as an ordinary object of garden culture. Improved varieties were probably first raised by the skilful gardeners of Holland, whose name for the fruit, Kruisbezie, may have been corrupted into the present English vernacular word.

Gooseberry growing occurred in 19th century, as described in the 1879 edition of the Encyclopedia Britannica:

In Britain, it is often found in copses and hedgerows and about old ruins, but the gooseberry has been cultivated for so long that it is difficult to distinguish wild bushes from feral ones, or to determine where the gooseberry fits into the native flora of the island. Although gooseberries are now abundant in Germany and France, it does not appear to have been much grown there in the Middle Ages; while the old English name, fea-berry, still surviving in some provincial dialects, indicates that it was similarly valued in Britain, where it was planted in gardens at a comparatively early period.

The climate of the British Isles seems peculiarly adapted to bring the gooseberry to perfection, and it may be grown successfully even in the most northern parts of Scotland; indeed, the flavour of the fruit is said to improve with increasing latitude. In Norway even, the bush flourishes in gardens on the west coast nearly up to the Arctic Circle, and it is found wild as far north as 63°. It will succeed in almost any soil but prefers a rich loam or black alluvium, and, though naturally a plant of rather dry places, will do well in moist land, if drained.

The gooseberry was more populous in North America before it was discovered that it carries blister rust, deadly to certain pines, resulting in its removal from forest areas.

=== Modern cultivation ===
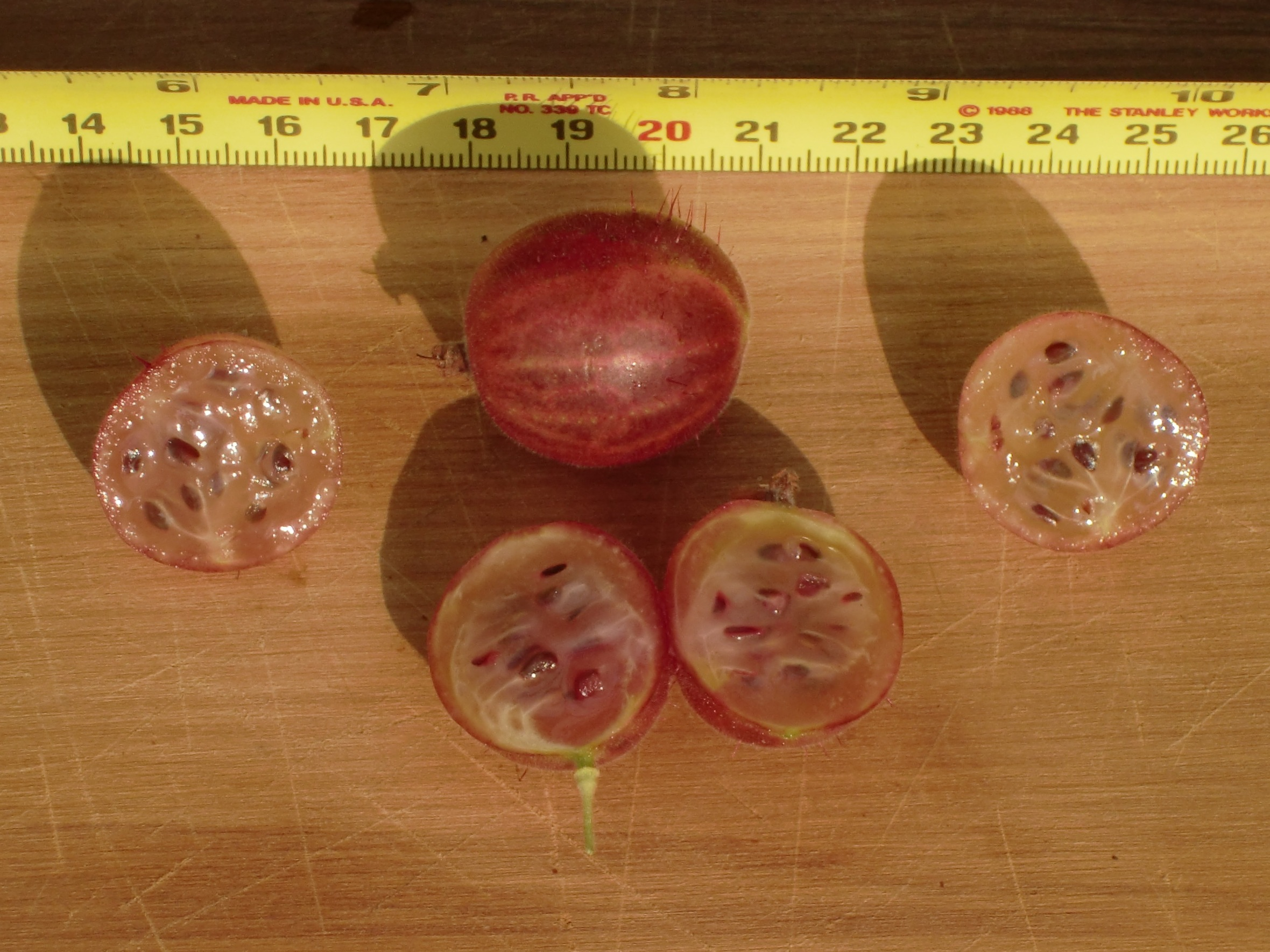
Sectioned gooseberries showing seeds

Humans cultivate gooseberries as insect habitats or directly for the sweet fruits. Numerous cultivars have been developed for both commercial and domestic use. Of special note are Ribes 'Careless', 'Greenfinch', 'Invicta', 'Leveller', and 'Whinham's Industry', to which the Royal Horticultural Society has awarded Garden Merit.

Ribes gooseberries are commonly raised from cuttings rather than seed; cuttings planted in the autumn will take root quickly and begin to bear fruit within a few years. Nevertheless, bushes planted from seed also rapidly reach maturity, exhibit similar pest-tolerance, and yield heavily. Fruit is produced on lateral spurs and the previous year's shoots.

Gooseberries must be pruned to insolate the interior and make space for the next year's branches, as well as reduce scratching from the spines when picking. Overladen branches can be (and often are) cut off complete with berries without substantially harming the plant. Heavy nitrogen composting produces excessive growth, weakening the bush to mildew.

== Culinary uses ==
Gooseberries are edible and can be eaten raw, or cooked as an ingredient in desserts, such as pies, fools and crumbles. Early pickings are generally sour and more appropriate for culinary use. This includes most supermarket gooseberries, which are often picked before fully ripe to increase shelf life. Gooseberries are also used to flavour beverages such as sodas, flavoured waters, or milk, and can be made into fruit wines and teas. Gooseberries can be preserved in the form of jams, dried fruit, as the primary or a secondary ingredient in pickling, or stored in sugar syrup. Pastry dishes often pair gooseberry with flavors such as hazelnut, honey, raspberry, strawberry, and white chocolate.

=== Nutrition ===
Raw gooseberries are 88% water, 10% carbohydrates, and 1% each of fat and protein. In a reference amount of 100 g (3.5 oz), raw gooseberries supply 44 calories and are a rich source of vitamin C (31% of the Daily Value), with no other micronutrients in significant content.

== See also ==
- List of gooseberries
