= Ribes binominatum =

Conservation status
- Imperiled (NatureServe)

Scientific classification
- Kingdom: Plantae
- Clade: Tracheophytes
- Clade: Angiosperms
- Clade: Eudicots
- Order: Saxifragales
- Family: Grossulariaceae
- Genus: Ribes
- Species: R. binominatum

Binomial name
- Ribes binominatum A.Heller

Synonyms
- Ribes montanum Howell 1898, illegitimate homonym not Philippi 1859; Grossularia binominata (A. Heller) Coville & Britton

Species of plant

Ribes binominatum is a species of currant known by the common names trailing gooseberry and ground gooseberry. It is native to the western United States.

== Description ==
Ribes binominatum is a low, spreading shrub no more than a meter (40 inches) tall, and often quite a bit shorter. Nodes along the stem each bear three spines up to 2 centimetres (3/4 in) in length. The hairy, glandular leaves are 2 to 5 cm (3/4 to 2 in) long, 2.5–5 cm (1–2 in) wide, and deeply divided into 3 or 5 rounded, toothed lobes.

The inflorescence is a solitary flower or a raceme of up to four flowers which dangling from the branches. The flower has five fuzzy sepals in shades of pale green, sometimes edged with red, which are reflexed upward. At the center is a tubular corolla of white or pinkish petals around five stamens and two shorter styles.

The fruit is a yellowish-green berry about 1 cm (3/8 in) wide which is covered in long prickles which harden into spines.

== Distribution and habitat ==
It is native to the Klamath Mountains and adjacent northern California Coast Ranges, in far northern California and western Oregon. It grows in higher-elevation forests and meadows.
