= Native American ethnobotany =

List of plants used by indigenous peoples of North America

Indigenous peoples of North America used various plants for different purposes. For lists pertaining specifically to the Cherokee, Haudenosaunee, Navajo, and Zuni, see Cherokee ethnobotany, Haudenosaunee ethnobotany, Navajo ethnobotany, and Zuni ethnobotany.

== A ==
- Abronia fragrans (snowball-sand verbena) Used as both food and medicine. See article for complete list of uses.
- Acer glabrum var. douglasii (Douglas maple), used by Plateau tribes as a treatment for diarrhea.
- Acer glabrum var. glabrum The Blackfoot take an infusion of the bark in the morning as a cathartic. The Okanagan-Colville, when hunting, use a branch tied in a knot and placed over the bear's tracks while hunting to stop the wounded bear. The Thompson people use a decoction of wood and bark taken for nausea caused by smelling a corpse.
- Acer negundo (box elder), used as food, lumber, and medicine. Please see article for full information.
- Acer saccharinum (silver maple), an infusion of bark removed from the south side of the tree is used by the Mohegan for cough medicine. It is also used by other tribes for various purposes.
- Acer saccharum (sugar maple), used by the Mohegan as a cough remedy, and the sap as a sweetening agent and to make maple syrup. It is also used by other tribes for various purposes.
- Actaea racemosa (black cohosh), used to treat gynecological and other disorders, including sore throats, kidney problems, and depression.
- Actaea rubra (red baneberry), used by the Algonquin for stomach pains, in some seasons for males, other seasons for females.
- Agrimonia gryposepala, used by the Haudenosaunee to treat diarrhea. Also used by the Cherokee to treat fever, by the Ojibwa for urinary problems, and by the Meskwaki and Prairie Potawatomi used it as a styptic for nosebleeds.
- Allium tricoccum, used as both food and medicine. Please see the article for full information.
- Alnus rhombifolia, used by some Plateau tribes for female health treatment.
- Alnus rubra, used to treat poison oak, insect bites, and skin irritations. The Blackfoot Confederacy used an infusion made from the bark of red alder to treat lymphatic disorders and tuberculosis. Recent clinical studies have verified that red alder contains betulin and lupeol, compounds shown to be effective against a variety of tumors.
- Artemisia californica (California Sagebrush), used by the Cahuilla and Tongva to alleviate menstrual cramps and menopause by taking it as a decoction, and consuming it regularly before the menstruation period. They also used it as an aid for child labor since the plant stimulates the uterine mucosa, quickening the process. The Cahuilla people chewed on the leaves, dried or fresh, to fight colds and coughs. The Ohlone used it to remove pain by applying it to wounds and teeth, to treat colds, coughs, and rheumatism by making it into a tea bath, and as a poultice for asthma.
- Artemisia douglasiana, used to treat colds, fevers, and headaches.
- Artemisia ludoviciana, used by several tribes for a variety of medicinal purposes.
- Arundinaria, used for medicinal as well as many other purposes.
- Asarum canadense, used to treat a number of ailments including dysentery, digestive problems, swollen breasts, coughs and colds, typhus, scarlet fever, nerves, sore throats, cramps, heaves, earaches, headaches, convulsions, asthma, tuberculosis, urinary disorders and venereal disease. They also used it as a stimulant, an appetite enhancer and a charm. It was also used as an admixture to strengthen other herbal preparations.
- Asclepias verticillata, used medicinally.

== B ==
- Baccharis sarothroides, used by the Seri people to make a decoction by cooking the twigs. This tea is used to treat colds, sinus headache, and general sore achy ailments. The same tea is also used as a rub for sore muscles. Studies done on plant extracts show that desert broom is rich in leutolin, a flavonoid that has demonstrated anti-inflammatory, antioxidant, and cholesterol lowering capabilities. Desert broom also has quercetin, a proven antioxidant, and apigenin a chemical which binds to the same brain receptor sites that Valium does.
- Balsamorhiza sagittata, used as food and medicine by many Native American groups, such as the Nez Perce, Kootenai, Cheyenne, and Salish.
- Baptisia australis – the Cherokee would use the roots in teas as a purgative or to treat tooth aches and nausea, while the Osage made an eyewash with the plant.
- Betula occidentalis, used by some Plateau tribes to treat pimples and sores.
- Blephilia ciliata, traditionally used by the Cherokee to make a poultice to treat headaches.
- Bloodroot, used as an emetic, respiratory aid, and other treatments.

== C ==
- Calypso (orchid), used by the Nlaka'pamux of British Columbia used it as a treatment for mild epilepsy.
- Cardamine diphylla, used for food and medicine. See article for full information.
- Caulophyllum
- Ceanothus integerrimus, the branches of which were used among the Indigenous peoples of California in treating women after childbirth.
- Ceanothus velutinus, used by certain Plateau tribes to create herbal tea to induce sweating as a treatment for colds, fevers, and influenza. Leaves were also used when rinsing to help prevent dandruff. C. velutinus was known as "red root" by many Native American tribes due to the color of the inner root bark, and was used as a medicine for treating lymphatic disorders, ovarian cysts, fibroid tumors, and tonsillitis. Clinical studies of the alkaloid compounds in C. velutinus has verified its effectiveness in treating high blood pressure and lymphatic blockages.
- Chimaphila umbellata, used by some Plateau tribes in an herbal tea to treat tuberculosis.
- Claytonia virginica (Virginia spring-beauty), used medicinally by the Haudenosaunee, who would give a cold infusion or decoction of the powdered roots to children suffering from convulsions. They would also eat the raw roots, believing that they permanently prevented conception. They would also eat the roots, as would the Algonquin people, who cooked them like potatoes.
- Cleome serrulata, used by tribes in the southwest to make an infusion to treat stomach illnesses and fevers. Poultices can be used on the eyes.
- Commelina dianthifolia, infusion of plant used by Keres as a strengthener for weakened tuberculosis patients.
- Cornus sericea, used by Plateau tribes to treat colds by eating the berries. Also used to slow bleeding.

== D ==
- Datura wrightii, the plant, often the root but any part of the plant could be used, was made into a tea which was then consumed as a rite of passage in Chumash ceremonies due to being a deliriant hallucinogen.
- Delphinium nudicaule, the root of which was used as a narcotic by the Mendocino.
- Devil's club, traditionally used by Native Americans to treat adult-onset diabetes and a variety of tumors. In vitro studies showed that extracts of devil's club inhibit tuberculosis microbes. The plant is used medicinally and ceremonially by the Tlingit people of Southeast Alaska, who refer to it as "Tlingit aspirin". A piece of devil's club hung over a doorway is said to ward off evil. The plant is harvested and used in a variety of ways, including lip balms, ointments, and herbal teas. Some Tlingit disapprove of the commercialization of the plant as they see it as a violation of its sacred status.

== E ==
- Echinacea, Echinacea angustifolia was widely used by the North American Plains Indians for its general medicinal qualities. Echinacea was one of the basic antimicrobial herbs of eclectic medicine from the mid 19th century through the early 20th century, and its use was documented for snakebite, anthrax, and for relief of pain. In the 1930s echinacea became popular in both Europe and America as an herbal medicine. According to Wallace Sampson, MD, its modern-day use as a treatment for the common cold began when a Swiss herbal supplement maker was "erroneously told" that echinacea was used for cold prevention by Native American tribes who lived in the area of South Dakota. Although Native American tribes didn't use echinacea to prevent the common cold, some Plains tribes did use echinacea to treat some of the symptoms that could be caused by the common cold: The Kiowa used it for coughs and sore throats, the Cheyenne for sore throats, the Pawnee for headaches, and many tribes including the Lakotah used it as an analgesic. Native Americans learned of E. angustifolia by observing elk seeking out the plants and consuming them when sick or wounded, and identified those plants as elk root. The following table examines why various tribes use echinacea.

Tribe	Uses
Cheyenne	Sore mouth/gums
Choctaws	Coughs, dyspepsia
Comanche	Toothache, sore throat
Crow	Colds, toothache, colic
Dakota (Oglala)	Cool inflammation
Delaware (Lenape)	Gonorrhea
Kiowa	Coughs, sore throat
Meskwaki	Cramps
Omaha	Septic diseases
Omaha-Ponca	Eye wash
Sioux (Dakota)	Bowels, tonsillitis

The entire echinacea plant is used medicinally, both dried and fresh. Common preparations include making a decoction or infusion of the roots and leaves, making a poultice of parts of the plant, juicing the root or simply using the leaves as they were.

Echinacea contains essential oils and polysaccharides that boost the immune system, leading to a faster recovery from various illnesses. Due to this property, echinacea has been commercialized and has had clinical trials support that it reduces the duration of a cold by 1–4 days and reduces the chance of developing a cold by 58%.

- Encelia farinosa (brittlebush), used by the Seri to treat toothache. For toothache the bark is removed, the branch heated in ashes, and then placed in the mouth to "harden" a loose tooth. The Cahuilla of California also used this as a toothache reliever, and to treat chest pain as well by heating the plant gum and applying it to the chest.
- Ephedra californica, used by the indigenous peoples of California.
- Epigaea repens, see article for full information.
- Equisetum hyemale, used by some Plateau tribes. They boiled the stalks to produce a drink used as a diuretic and to treat venereal disease.
- Erigenia bulbosa, the Cherokee were known to chew this plant as medicine for toothaches, it is unknown what parts of plant they chewed.
- Eriodictyon crassifolium, used by the Chumash people to keep airways open for proper breathing.
- Eriodictyon trichocalyx (Yerba Santa), used by the Cahuilla to pure blood and to treat coughs, colds, sore throats, asthma, tuberculosis, and catarrh. It was also used as a liniment, a poultice, and a tea bath to treating rheumatism, fatigued limbs, sores, and fevers. The Chumash also used this as a liniment for the feet and chest.
- Eriodictyon californicum (Yerba Santa), Native Americans used it to treat asthma, upper respiratory infections, and allergic rhinitis. The Chumash used it to poultice broken bones, wounds, insect bites, and sores. A steam bath was used to treat hemorrhoids.
- Eryngium aquaticum, used by the Cherokee for nausea, by the Choctaw people used it as a remedy for snakebite and gonorrhea, and by the Delaware people for intestinal worms.
- Erythrina herbacea, Creek women used an infusion of the root for bowel pain; the Choctaw used a decoction of the leaves as a general tonic; the Seminole used an extract of the roots for digestive problems, and extracts of the seeds, or of the inner bark, as an external rub for rheumatic disorders.
- Eurybia macrophylla (bigleaf aster), used as both food and medicine. Please see article for more information.

== G ==
- Gaultheria hispidula (creeping snowberry) Infusion of leaves used as a tonic for overeating by the Algonquin people. Fruit used as food. Used as a sedative by the Anticosti. Decoction of leaves or whole plant taken for unspecified purpose by Micmac. Leaves used by Ojibwa people to make a beverage.
- Gaultheria procumbens, used by various tribes.
- Gentiana villosa, Catawba Indians used the boiled roots as medicine to relieve back pain.
- Geranium maculatum, used by the Meskwaki people to brew a root tea for toothache and for painful nerves. They also mashed the roots for treating hemorrhoids.
- Goldenseal, referred to by Prof. Benjamin Smith Barton in his first edition of Collections for an Essay Toward a Materia Medica of the United States (1798), as being used by the Cherokee as a cancer treatment.
- Gutierrezia microcephala, used by the Native Americans for various reasons. The Cahuilla used an infusion of the plant as a gargle or placed the plant in their mouths as a toothache remedy. The Hopi and Tewa both used the plant as a carminative, as prayer stick decorations, and for roasting sweet corn.

== H ==
- Hamamelis virginiana, also known as Witch Hazel. Native Americans produced witch hazel extract by boiling the stems of the shrub and producing a decoction, which was used to treat swellings, inflammations, and tumors. Early Puritan settlers in New England adopted this remedy from the natives, and its use became widely established in the United States. It is a flowering plant with multiple species native to North America. It has been widely used by Native Americans for its medicinal benefits, leading white settlers to incorporate it into their own medical practices. An extract of witch hazel stems is used to treat sore muscles, skin and eye inflammation and to stop bleeding. Witch hazel is utilized by many tribes, including the Menominee for sore legs of tribesmen who participate in sporting games, the Osage for skin ulcers and sores, the Potawatomi in sweat lodges for sore muscles and the Haudenosaunee in tea for coughs and colds.

Tribe	Uses
Cherokee	Pain relief, colds, skin issues and fever
Chippewa	Skin issues, emetic, sore eyes
Haudenosaunee Confederation	Antidiarrheal, blood purifier, arthritis, appetite stimulant
Menominee	Predictor of future healing
Potawatomi	Sore muscles
Mohegan	Dowsing

Witch hazel works as an astringent, a substance that causes the constriction of body tissues. The tannins and flavonoids found in witch hazel have astringent and antioxidant properties, respectively, which are thought to contract and protect blood vessels, thereby reducing inflammation. However, modern witch hazel extracts are often distilled and do not contain tannins due to health concerns.

- Heracleum maximum, used by various Native American peoples. Perhaps the most common use was to make poultices to be applied to bruises or sores.an infusion of the flowers can be rubbed on the body to repel flies and mosquitoes.
- Holodiscus discolor, used by Indian tribes, such as the Stl'atl'imx. They would steep the berries in boiling water to use as a treatment for diarrhea, smallpox, chickenpox and as a blood tonic.
- Holodiscus dumosus, used by the Paiute and Shoshone as medicine for problems such as stomachaches and colds.
- Hydrangea arborescens, used in the treatment of kidney and bladder stones.
- Hydrangea cinerea, used by the Cherokee.

== I ==
- Ilex verticillata, used by Native Americans for medicinal purposes, the origin of the name "fever bush".
- Iris missouriensis, the roots of which were used by some Plateau tribes to treat toothache.

== J ==
- Jeffersonia diphylla – the Cherokee reportedly used an infusion of this plant for treating dropsy and urinary tract problems, it was also used as a poultice for sores and inflammation. The Haudenosaunee used a decoction of the plant to treat liver problems and diarrhea.
- Juniperus communis – Western American tribes combined the berries of Juniperus communis with Berberis root bark in a herbal tea. Native Americans also used juniper berries as a female contraceptive.
- Juniperus scopulorum, the leaves and inner bark of which were boiled by some Plateau tribes to create an infusion to treat coughs and fevers. The berries were also sometimes boiled into a drink used as a laxative and to treat colds.

== K ==
- Krascheninnikovia lanata, used for a wide variety of ailments.

== L ==
- Larrea tridentata, used by Native Americans in the Southwest as a treatment for many maladies, including sexually transmitted diseases, tuberculosis, chicken pox, dysmenorrhea, and snakebite. The shrub is still widely used as a medicine in Mexico. It contains nordihydroguaiaretic acid.
- Lobelia, used to treat respiratory and muscle disorders, and as a purgative. The species used most commonly in modern herbalism is Lobelia inflata (Indian tobacco).
- Lophophora williamsii, has at least 5,500 years of entheogenic and medicinal use by indigenous North Americans.

== M ==
- Mahonia aquifolium, used by some Plateau tribes to treat dyspepsia.
- Mahonia nervosa, an infusion of the root of which was used some Plateau tribes to treat rheumatism.
- Mahonia repens, used by the Tolowa and Karok of Northwest California used the roots for a blood and cough tonic, as well as by other tribes for various purposes.
- Malosma, the root bark of which was used by the Chumash to make an herbal tea for treating dysentery.
- Menispermum canadense, Cherokee used as a laxative, and as a gynecological and venereal aid. The root was used for skin diseases. The Lenape used it in a salve for sores on the skin.

== O ==
- Osmunda claytoniana, used by the Haudenosaunee for blood and venereal diseases and conditions.

== P ==
- Pectis papposa, used as food and medicine.
- Persicaria amphibia, used medicinally.
- Pinus quadrifolia, used medicinally by the Cahuilla by taking the resin and making a face cream usually used by girls to prevent sunburn. The resin was also used as a glue for fixing pottery and reattaching arrowheads to the arrow shafts. The nuts were given to babies as an alternative for breast milk; were ground then mixed with water as a drink; were roasted; were ground into mush; and were an important trade item. The pine needles and roots were materials for basketry and the bark was used as roofing material of houses. The wood was burnt as firewood because of high combustibility and incense for the pleasant smell it emitted when burnt. The Diegueno also ate nuts and the seeds also.
- Pinus strobus, the resin of which was used by the Chippewa to treat infections and gangrene.
- Pluchea sericea, used as an antidiarrheal and eyewash.
- Podophyllum peltatum, used as an emetic, cathartic, and anthelmintic agent. They also boiled the poisonous root, and used the water to treat stomach aches.
- Populus tremuloides, the bark of which contains a substance that can be extracted and used as a quinine substitute.
- Prunus emarginata, used by Kwakwaka'wakw and other tribes for medicinal purposes, such as poultices and bark infusions.
- Prunus virginiana, the root bark of which was once made into an asperous-textured concoction used to ward off or treat colds, fever and stomach maladies by Native Americans.
- Pseudognaphalium obtusifolium, ssp obtusifolium, see article for full information.

== R ==
- Ribes aureum, used as medicine by several tribes.
- Ribes divaricatum, used by various tribes in the Pacific Northwest.
- Ribes glandulosum (skunk currant), used in a compound decoction of the root for back pain and for "female weakness" by the Ojibwa people. The Cree people use a decoction of the stem, either by itself or mixed with wild red raspberry, to prevent clotting after birth. The Algonquin people use the berries as food.
- Ribes laxiflorum, used an infusion to make an eyewash (roots and or branches, by the Bella Coolah). Decoctions of: bark to remedy tuberculosis (with the roots, by the Skokomish); or for the common cold (Skagit): leaves and twigs, as a general tonic (Lummi).
- Ribes oxyacanthoides, used medicinally.

== S ==
- Sage is a small evergreen shrub used to treat inflammation, bacterial or viral infection and chronic illness. Commonly treated conditions include abdominal cramping/pain, bloating, bleeding, bruising, skin disease, cough, excessive sweating, menstrual cramps and flu as well as depression, obesity heart disease and cancer. Sage can be administered in tea, food, as a poultice or in smoke. Sage contains multiple essential oils as well as tannins and flavonoids, which have "carminative, antispasmodic, antiseptic, and astringent properties". In addition to being used in modern food preparation, sage is still utilized for herbal and pharmaceutical medicines with strong evidence supporting its impacts. The following table examines why various tribes use sage.

Tribe	Uses
Cahuilla	Colds, shampoo, deodorant, cleanse hunting equipment of bad luck
Costanoan	Eye cleanser, fevers
Dakota (Oglala)	Disinfectant, stomach ache
Diegueno	Colds, poison oak treatment, general strengthening
Eskimo	Inflammation
Mahuna	Heal damage from birth
Tübatulabal	Consumed seeds as food

- Salvia apiana, several tribes used the seed for removing foreign objects from the eye, similar to the way that Clary sage seeds were used in Europe. A tea from the roots was used by the Cahuilla women for healing and strength after childbirth. The leaves are also burnt by many Native American tribes, with the smoke used in different purification rituals. A study performed at the University of Arizona in 1991 demonstrated that Salvia apiana has potential antibacterial properties against Staphylococcus aureus, Bacillus subtilis, Klebsiella pneumoniae, and Candida brassicae.
- Salvia mellifera, the leaves and stems of the plant were made by the Chumash into a strong sun tea. This was rubbed on the painful area or used to soak one's feet. The plant contains diterpenoids, such as aethiopinone and ursolic acid, that are pain relievers.
- Senegalia greggii, the fresh pods were eaten unripe by the Chemehuevi, Pima, and the Cahuilla. The Cahuilla dried the pods then ground it for mush and cakes, the Havasupai ground it to make bread flour, and the Seri ground it to meal to mix with water and sea lion oil for porridge. The Diegueno used it as food for domesticated animals. The Cahuilla and Pima used it for construction material and firewood. The Havasupai split the twigs to make as basket material and used bundles as a broom for dusting off metates. The Papago broke the twigs in half to make baskets, and were curved to make difficult weaves in the baskets. The Pima piled dried bushes for a brush fence, and used the branches for cradle frames too. The Papago deer hunters wore the branches as a disguise as a deer, and the buds and blossoms were dried for perfume pouches. The branches were used to dislodge saguaro fruits from the body, and the rods were used to remove flesh from animal skins. The Pima used the wood for bows.
- Silene latifolia, subspecies alba: Infusion used by the Ojibwa as a physic. Note that this plant is not native to the Americas and was introduced by Europeans.

== T ==
- Tobacco, previously used for a variety of medicinal purposes
- Trichostema lanatum, used for a variety of medicinal purposes.
- Trichostema lanceolatum, used by natives of northern California as a cold and fever remedy, a pain reliever, and a flea repellent.
- Triodanis perfoliata, see article for full information.

== U ==
- Poultices of Umbellularia leaves were used to treat rheumatism and neuralgias. A tea was made from the leaves to treat stomach aches, colds, sore throats, and to clear up mucus in the lungs. The leaves were steeped in hot water to make an infusion that was used to wash sores. The Pomo and Yuki tribes of Mendocino County treated headaches by placing a single leaf in the nostril or bathing the head with a laurel leaf infusion.

== V ==
- Viburnum prunifolium, a decoction of which was to treat gynecological conditions, including menstrual cramps, aiding recovery after childbirth, and in treating the effects of menopause.
- Virginia iris – Cherokee and other tribes in the southeastern United States are known to have used Virginia iris for its medicinal properties. The root was pounded into a paste that was used as a salve for skin. An infusion made from the root was used to treat ailments of the liver, and a decoction of root was used to treat "yellowish urine". Virginia iris may have been one of the iris species used by the Seminole to treat "shock following alligator-bite".

== W ==
- The inner bark of willow trees has been used by Native American groups for health issues including headache, bleeding cuts, skin sores, fever, cough and hoarseness, menstrual cramping, stomach pain and diarrhea. The inner bark is most often made into tea and drank, though it is also made into a poultice to cover the skin over broken bones or used to wash skin and hair to promote skin repair and hair growth.

Tribe	Uses
Keres	Analgesic
Hualapai	Antirheumatic
Alabama	Antidiarrheal
Abnaki	Cough Medicine
Navajo	Ceremonial Medicine
Thompson	Orthopedic Aid (i.e. broken bones), colds, coughs, laxative
Seminole	Analgesic

Willow bark contains salicin, a compound similar to aspirin that has anti-inflammatory, antipyretic, and analgesic properties. The following table examines why various tribes use willow.

One reason for the vast differences in the use of the willow is that there are many ways to prepare it and these different preparations allow for it to be utilized in different ways. For example, the Thompson people would make a concoction of wood, willow, soapberry branches and "anything weeds" to treat broken bones. If they wanted to treat a cold, however, the Thompson people would make a decoction of red willow branches and wild rose roots.

== Y ==
- Yucca glauca, used by the Blackfoot, Cheyenne, Lakota, and other tribes.

== See also ==
- Navajo ethnobotany
- Zuni ethnobotany
- Plants used in traditional Native American medicine
- List of plants used in herbalism
- Traditional Alaska Native medicine
- Traditional knowledge
