= Haudenosaunee ethnobotany =

The Haudenosaunee use a wide variety of medicinal plants (Note: Mohawk: ononhkwa’shón:’a; Cayuga: onǫ́hgwatraˀ; Seneca: onö́hgwa’shä’) including quinine, chamomile, ipecac, and a form of penicillin.

== Amaryllidaceae ==
- Allium tricoccum (Mohawk: iokhahon’kó:wa, Oneida: aˀnukkó), decoction is used to treat worms in children, and they also use the decoction as a spring tonic to "clean you out". Also eaten as a part of traditional cuisine.

== Asteraceae (Aster, daisy, composite, or sunflower family) ==
- Cichorium intybus, decoction of the roots is used as a wash and applied as a poultice to chancres and fever sores.
- Solidago rugosa (Seneca: jítgwä:’ë:’ or niyáwéó’dë:h, referring to any goldenrod), whole plant used for biliousness and as liver medicine, and decoction of its flowers and leaves for dizziness, weakness or sunstroke.
- Symphyotrichum novae-angliae, is used in a decoction for weak skin, use a decoction of the roots and leaves for fevers, use the plant as a "love medicine", and use an infusion of whole plant and rhizomes from another plant to treat mothers with intestinal fevers.

== Brassicaceae (Mustards, Crucifers, or Cabbage family) ==
- Cardamine diphylla, infusion of the whole plant taken to strengthen the breasts. The Haudenosaunee also chew the raw root for stomach gas, apply a poultice of roots to swellings, take a cold infusion of the plant for fever and for "summer complaint, drink a cold infusion of the roots for "when love is too strong", and use an infusion of the roots when "heart jumps and the head goes wrong." They also use a compound for chest pains. They also take an infusion of the plant at the beginning of tuberculosis. They also eat the roots raw with salt or boiled.

== Cyperaceae (Sedge family) ==
- Carex oligosperma, a compound decoction of the plant as an emetic before running or playing lacrosse.

== Ericaceae (Heath or Heather family) ==
- Epigaea repens, a compound is used for labor pains in parturition, compound decoction used for rheumatism, decoction of the leaves taken for indigestion, and a decoction of the whole plant or roots, stalks and leaves taken for the kidneys.

== Fabaceae (Legume, pea, or bean family) ==
- Apios americana, consumed as food.
- Senna hebecarpa, plant used as a worm remedy and take a compound decoction as a laxative.

== Grossulariaceae ==
- Ribes triste, fruit mashed, made them into small cakes, and stored them for future use. They later soak the fruit cakes in warm water and cook them a sauce or mix them with corn bread. They also sun dry or fire dry the raw or cooked fruit for future use and take the dried fruit with them as a hunting food.

== Lamiaceae (Mint, deadnettle, or sage family) ==
- Agastache nepetoides, compound infusion of plants used as a wash for poison ivy and itch.

== Onoclea (Sensitive Fern) ==
- Onoclea sensibilis (Onondaga: onihsowä́khwaˀ), used in both oral and topical forms, a decoction extensively applied for women's issues (to initiate menses, fertility, pain and strength after childbirth and stimulating milk flow), for early tuberculosis, treating baldness, as a gastrointestinal aid for swelling and cramps, for arthritis and infection. A poultice of the top leaves was used for deep cuts and infection. A cold compound infusion of the entire fern plant was washed on sores and taken for venereal disease, e.g. gonorrhea.

== Osmundaceae (Royal fern family) ==
- Osmunda claytoniana (Seneca: osjé’sä:’), used for blood and venereal diseases.

== Papaveraceae (Poppy family) ==
- Chelidonium majus, infusion mixed with another plant and milk given to pigs that drool and have sudden movements.

== Pinaceae ==
- Abies balsamea (Mohawk: otsho'kó:tonh, Cayuga: otsgóˀdaˀ, Seneca: sohgo:döh), steam from a decoction of branches used as a bath for rheumatism and parturition, and ingest a decoction of the plant for rheumatism. They take a compound decoction for colds and coughs, sometimes mixing it with alcohol. They apply a compound decoction of the plant for cuts, sprains, bruises and sores, and use steam. They apply a poultice of the gum and dried beaver kidneys for cancer. They also take a compound decoction in the early stages of tuberculosis, and they use the plant for bedwetting and gonorrhea.
- Pinus rigida, pitch used to treat rheumatism, burns, cuts, and boils. Pitch also used as a laxative. A pitch pine poultice used to open boils and to treat abscesses.

== Ranunculaceae (Buttercup or crowfoot family) ==
- Ranunculus acris (Mohawk: owihstohseráhereh), poultice of the smashed plant to the chest for pains and for colds, infusion taken of the roots for diarrhea, and apply a poultice of plant fragments with another plant to the skin for excess water in the blood.

== Rosaceae (Rose family) ==
- Agrimonia gryposepala (Seneca: ye’áhšohga:ta’), drink made from the roots used to treat diarrhea,
- Potentilla canadensis, pounded infusion of the roots given as an antidiarrheal.
- Waldsteinia fragarioides, a compound decoction of the plants used as a blood remedy, and poultice of the smashed plants applied to snakebites.
