= Cherokee ethnobotany =

This is a list of plants documented to have been traditionally used by the Cherokee, their Cherokee names, and how they are used.

== Adoxaceae (moschatel family) ==
- Viburnum nudum var. cassinoides (Cherokee: ᎧᏂᎦ, romanized: kaniga, commonly known as withe-rod, witherod viburnum, possumhaw, and wild raisin) – an infusion of the plant taken to prevent recurrent spasms, root bark used as a diaphoretic and a tonic, and compound infusion of it taken for fever, smallpox and ague. An infusion of the bark used as a wash for a sore tongue.
- Viburnum prunifolium (commonly known as black haw) – an infusion of the plant taken to prevent recurrent spasms, root bark used as a diaphoretic and a tonic, and compound infusion of it taken for fever, smallpox and ague. An infusion of the bark used as a wash for a sore tongue.

== Amaryllidaceae (amaryllis family) ==
- Allium tricoccum (Cherokee: ᎤᏩᏍᏗ, romanized: uwasdi, commonly known as ramp, ramps, spring onion, ramson, wild leek, wood leek, and wild garlic), eaten as food. The Cherokee also eat the plant as a spring tonic, for colds and for croup. They also use the warm juice for earaches.

== Asteraceae (aster, daisy, sunflower, or composite family) ==
- Cichorium intybus (common names are chicory or common chicory – an infusion of the root is used as a tonic for nerves. This plant is not native to the Americas and was introduced by colonists.
- Pseudognaphalium obtusifolium ssp. obtusifolium (Cherokee: ᎪᏍᏚᏛ, romanized: gosdudv, common names include old field balsam, rabbit tobacco and sweet everlasting), used in a compound for muscle cramps, local pains, and twitching, and apply an infusion of it over scratches made over muscle cramp pain. It is also used internally with Carolina vetch for rheumatism. A decoction is taken for colds, and the plant is also made into cough syrup. It is used in a sweat bath to treat various diseases, made into a warm liquid blown down throat for clogged throat (diphtheria), chewed for a sore mouth, smoked for asthma, and chewed for a sore throat.
- Symphyotrichum novae-angliae (common names New England aster or Michaelmas daisy), poultice of roots used for pain, infusion of the roots for diarrhea, and the ooze of the roots is sniffed for catarrh. An infusion of the plant for fever.
- Tanacetum vulgare (common name tansy) – an infusion of the plant is used for backache, the plant is used as a tonic, and worn it around the waist and in shoes to prevent miscarriages. This plant is not native to the Americas and was introduced by colonists.

== Berberidaceae ==
- Jeffersonia diphylla (common names include twinleaf or rheumatism root), used in an infusion for treating dropsy, as well as gravel and urinary tract problems. Also used as a poultice for sores and inflammation.

== Campanulaceae (bellflower family) ==
- Triodanis perfoliata (Cherokee: ᎤᏍᏆᏰᎴ, romanized: usquayele, common name clasping Venus's looking glass), root used in liquid compound for dyspepsia from overeating, and infusion of roots taken and use it as a bath for dyspepsia.

== Cyperaceae ==
- Carex, infusion of the leaf used to "check bowels".

== Ericaceae (heath or heather family) ==
- Epigaea repens (Cherokee: ᏓᏏᎤᏬᏱ, romanized: dasiuwoyi, ᏙᎧᏏ ᎪᏥᏥ dokasi gotsitsi, ᎣᎦᏄ ᎠᎦᏓᎨ oganu agadage, common names are mayflower or trailing arbutus) decoction of the plant used to induce vomiting to treat abdominal pain, and they give an infusion of the plant to children for diarrhea. An infusion is also used for the kidneys and for "chest ailment". They also take a compound infusion for indigestion.
- Kalmia latifolia (Cherokee: ᏚᏑᎦ ᏧᏅᏍᏘᏯ, romanized: dusuga tsunvstiya, ᏚᏑ ᏧᏅᏍᏗ dusu tsunvsdi, ᏚᏑ ᎤᎪ dusu ugo, common names include mountain-laurel, calico-bush, or spoonwood,), used as an analgesic by placing an infusion of leaves put on scratches made over location of the pain. The bristly edges of ten to twelve leaves" are rubbed over the skin for rheumatism, leaves are also crushed to rub brier scratches. The plant is used an infusion as a wash "to get rid of pests", used in a compound as a liniment, leaf ooze is rubbed into scratched skin of ball players to prevent cramps, and a leaf salve is used for healing. The wood is also used for carving.
- Lyonia mariana (common names include Piedmont staggerbush and staggerbush) – an infusion of the plant used for toe itch, 'ground-itch' and ulcers.

== Fabaceae (legume, bean, or pea family) ==
- Baptisia australis (common names include blue wild indigo, blue false indigo, indigo weed, rattleweed, rattlebush, and horsefly weed), the roots of which are used in an herbal tea as a purgative or to treat tooth aches and nausea,
- Senna hebecarpa (Cherokee: ᎬᎿᎨ, romanized: gvhnage, common names include American senna and wild senna) The Cherokee use infusion of the plant for various purposes, including taking it for cramps, heart trouble, giving it to children and adults as a purgative and for fever, and taking it for 'blacks' (hands and eye sockets turn black). They also give an infusion of the root specifically to children for fever. The Cherokee use a poultice the root for sores, and they use a compound infusion for fainting spells. It is also used use a compound for pneumonia.
- Vicia caroliniana (Cherokee: ᎠᎵᏦᏍᏘ, romanized: alitsosti, ᎠᎵᏦᎤᏍᏓ alitsousda, ᎤᎵᏦᏍᏔ ᎤᏍᏘᎦ ulitsosta ustiga, common name Carolina vetch, or Carolina wood vetch), used for back pains, local pains, to toughen muscles, for muscular cramps, twitching and is rubbed on stomach cramps. They also use a compound for rheumatism, for an affliction called "blacks", and it is taken for wind before a ball game. An infusion is used for muscle pain, in that it is rubbed on scratches made over the location of the pain. An infusion is also taken as an emetic. It is also used internally with Pseudognaphalium obtusifolium ssp. obtusifolium for rheumatism.

== Hydrangeaceae ==
- Hydrangea cinerea (common names include ashy or gray hydrangea) An infusion of the bark scrapings is taken for vomiting bile, and an infusion of the roots is taken as a cathartic and emetic by women during menses.

== Iridaceae ==
- Iris cristata (common names dwarf crested iris, crested iris) – a decoction of the pulverized root is used as salve for ulcers. An infusion (tea) is taken for liver. A decoction of the root is also used to treat a "yellowish urine". The root is also used as an ingredient in a cream applied to skin ulcers.
- Iris virginica (common name Virginia iris) – the root is pounded into a paste that is used as a salve for skin. An infusion made from the root is used to treat ailments of the liver, and a decoction of root is used to treat "yellowish urine".

== Juglandaceae ==
- Carya spp. (common name: hickory) - the nut of which was traditionally used by the Cherokee in making Kanuchi, the Hickory nut soup.

== Lamiaceae (mint or deadnettle family) ==
- Blephilia ciliata (Cherokee: ᎪᏩᏌᎩ, romanized: gowasagi, common names include downy pagoda plant, sunny woodmint and Ohio horsemint.), used make a poultice to treat headaches.

== Lythraceae ==
- Lythrum alatum var. lanceolatum (common names include winged loosestrife, winged lythrum, angled purple-loosestrife), infusion taken for kidneys.

== Onagraceae (willowherb or evening primrose family) ==
- Oenothera fruticosa (Cherokee: ᎠᏅᏓᏌ ᎡᏆ, romanized: anvdasa equa or ᏏᏆ ᎤᏂᎩᏍᏗ iqua unigisdi, common names include narrowleaf evening primrose or narrow-leaved sundrops) The Cherokee parboil the leaves, rinse them and cook in hot grease as a potherb.

== Pontederiaceae ==
- Heteranthera reniformis, hot poultice of roots applied to inflamed wounds and sores.

== Ranunculaceae (buttercup or crowfoot family) ==
- Hydrastis canadensis (common names include goldenseal, orangeroot and yellow puccoon, used as a cancer treatment.
- Ranunculus acris (common names include meadow buttercup, tall buttercup and giant buttercup. used as a poultice for abscesses, as an oral infusion for "thrush", and the juice is used as a sedative. They also cook the leaves and eat them as greens. (Note: This plant was introduced from Eurasia, and is not native to North America.)

== Rosaceae (rose family) ==
- Agrimonia gryposepala (commonly known as tall hairy agrimony, common agrimony, hooked agrimony, or tall hairy grooveburr), used to treat fever.

== Sapindaceae (soapberry family) ==
- Acer saccharinum common names silver maple, creek maple, silverleaf maple, soft maple, large maple, water maple, swamp maple, or white maple, The Cherokee take an infusion of the bark for cramps, dysentery, and hives. They boil the inner bark and use it with water as a wash for sore eyes. They also take a compound infusion of the bark for "female trouble" and cramps. They take a hot infusion of the bark for measles, and use the tree to make baskets, for lumber, building material, and for carving.
