= Kashaya =

Kashaya has several meanings, see:

- Kāṣāya, the traditional monastic robes of Buddhist monks and nuns.
- Kashaya language, a distinct Pomo language on the Sonoma County Coastline, California
- The subgroup of Pomo people who spoke this language
- Kashia Band of Pomo Indians of the Stewarts Point Rancheria
- Kashaya (Jainism), a word and concept in Jainism that roughly translates to "passion"
- Kashayam, an Ayurvedic medical concoction popular in South India
