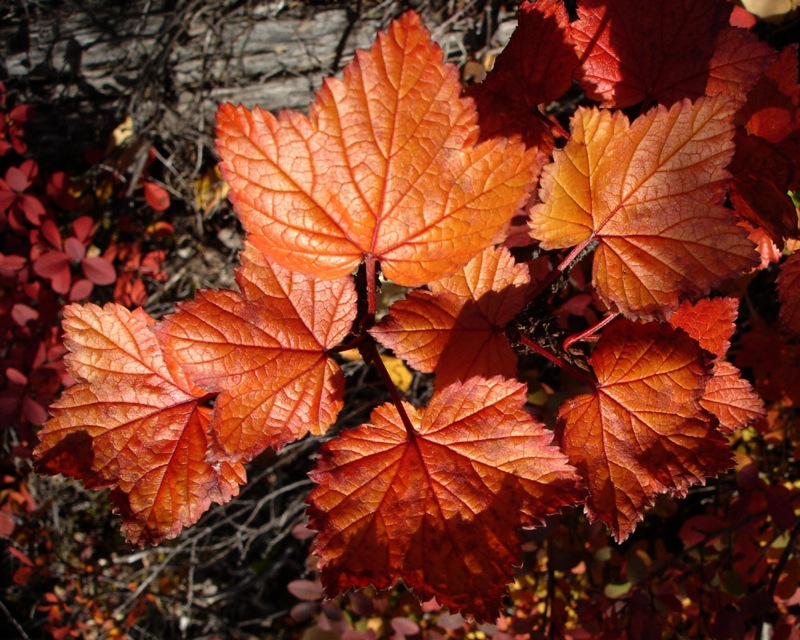

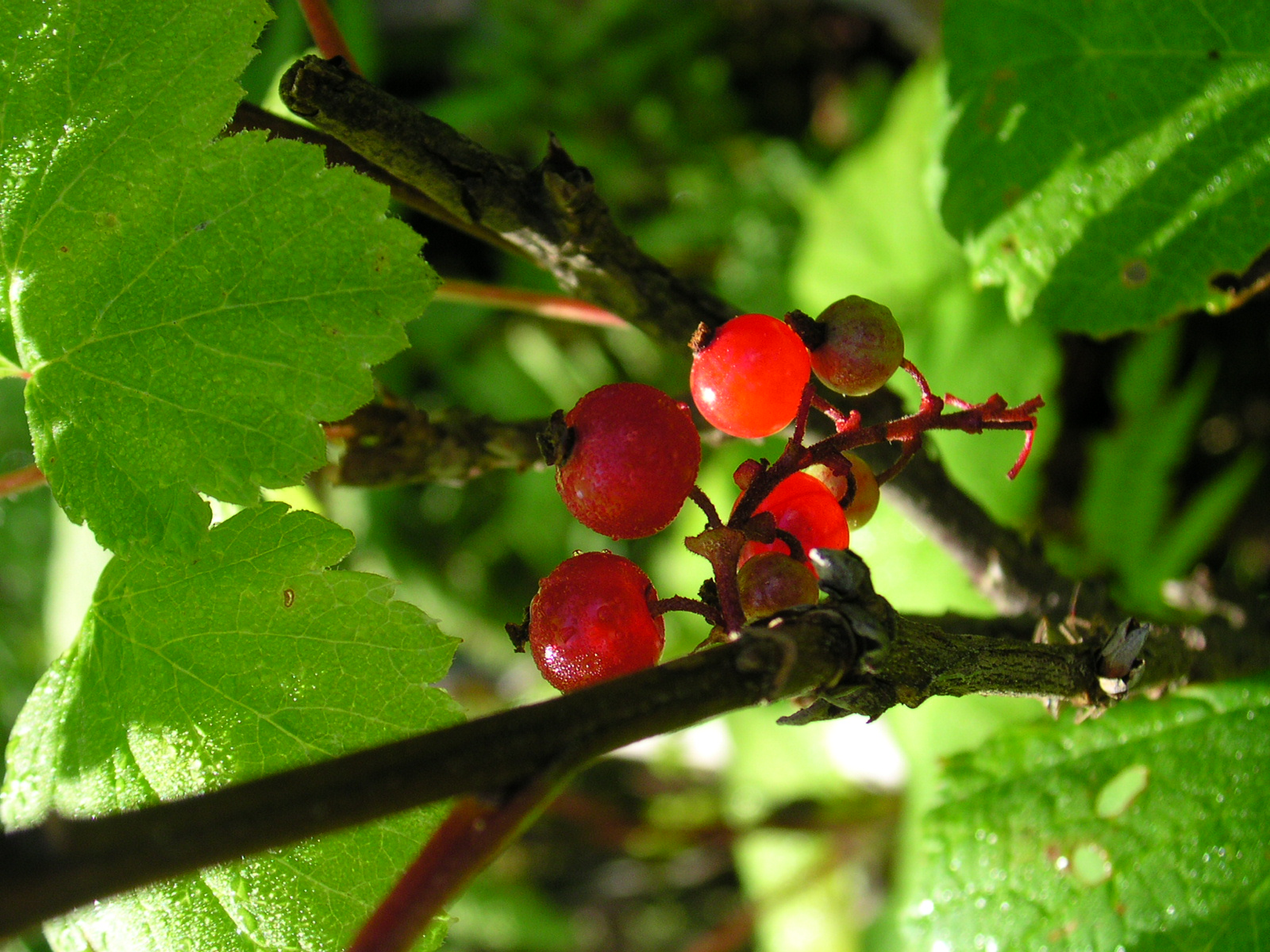

Scientific classification
- Kingdom: Plantae
- Clade: Tracheophytes
- Clade: Angiosperms
- Clade: Eudicots
- Order: Saxifragales
- Family: Grossulariaceae
- Genus: Ribes
- Species: R. triste

Binomial name
- Ribes triste Pall. 1797 not Turcz. 1837

Synonyms
- Coreosma tristis (Pall.) Lunell; Ribes albinervium Michx.; Ribes ciliosum Howell; Ribes melancholicum Siev. ex Pall.; Ribes propinquum Turcz.; Ribes rubrum var. propinquum Trautv. & C.A. Mey.; Ribes repens A.I. Baranov

= Ribes triste =

Berry and plant

Ribes triste, known as the northern red currant, swamp red currant, or wild red currant, is an Asian and North American shrub in the gooseberry family. It grows to 50 centimetres (20 in) tall, with a lax branches. From June to July, purplish flowers are displayed. The fruit is a sour, bright red berry, which is edible. It has been used in the cuisine and medicine of various indigenous peoples of the Americas.

== Description ==
Ribes triste is an Asian and North American shrub in the gooseberry family. It grows to 50 centimetres (20 in) tall, with lax, often creeping, branches. The leaves are alternate, 6–10 cm (2 1/4–4 in) across, hairy below, and palmate with 3–5 lobes.

From June to July, 6–13 small, purplish flowers are displayed in pendulous racemes, 4–7 cm (1 1/2–2 3/4 in) long. The axis of the raceme is glandular. The fruit is a bright red berry, without the hairs that some currants have; it is rather sour.

=== Common names ===
Ribes triste is also known as the northern red currant, swamp red currant, wild red currant, red currant, American red currant, and swamp currant.

== Distribution and habitat ==
Ribes triste is widespread across Canada and the northern United States, as well as in eastern Asia (Russia, China, Korea, Japan). It grows in wet rocky woods, swamps, and cliffs.

=== As a weed ===
Ribes is listed a plant pest in Michigan and the planting of it in certain parts of the state is prohibited.

=== Conservation ===
It is listed as endangered in Connecticut and Ohio, and as threatened in Pennsylvania.

== Uses ==
=== Culinary ===
The berries are edible. Alaska Natives eat them raw and make them into jam and jellies. Eskimos eat the berries and the Iñupiat eat them raw or cooked, mix them with other berries which are used to make a traditional dessert. They also mix the berries with rosehips and highbush cranberries and boil them into a syrup. The Upper Tanana also eat the berries as food.

The Haudenosaunee mash the fruit, make them into small cakes, and store them for future use. They later soak the fruit cakes in warm water and cooked them a sauce or mixed them with corn bread. They also sun dry or fire dry the raw or cooked fruit for future use and take the dried fruit with them as a hunting food.

The Ojibwe eat the berries raw, and also preserve them by cooking them, spreading them on birch bark into little cakes, which are dried and stored for winter use. In the winter, they often eat the berries with cooked sweet corn. They also use the berries to make jams and preserves.

=== Medicinal ===
The Ojibwe take a decoction of the root and stalk for kidney stones ('gravel') and a compound decoction of the stalk to curtail menstruation; the leaves are used as a "female remedy". The Upper Tanana use a decoction of the stems without the bark as a wash for sore eyes.
