= Erie Stone =

Rocks used in traditional medicine

Erie Stones or pierres Erienes are rocks used in First Nations (Native American) traditional medicine. Francois Gendron, the French Jesuit surgeon at Sainte-Marie among the Hurons mission, first described its use in the 1640s in letters later published in 1660. Gendron described the sources of these stones as being at the base of Niagara Falls and that a local Native American group settled there and traded this item to other First Nations communities. The ointment created from this rock was said to help the healing of "wounds, fistulas and malignant ulcers".

Exactly what the rock was that this ointment was made from has been open to debate since Gendron first described it. He described the rock as a yellowish salt formed from the petrification of foam formed at the foot of Niagara Falls. There is also debate among historians whether he actually visited the area to collect samples or was supplied with them and a description of their location from Native American traders.

Jury and Jury interpreted Gendron’s description as describing calcareous tufa, a rock formed by precipitation from supersaturated limestone deposits. Hunter, however, identified it with aragonite, a crystalline form of calcium carbonate, with the inclusion of magnesium sulphate and calcium sulphate. Hunter was able to collect samples from below Niagara Falls in 1982. According to him, the mineral forms by the seepage of slightly acidic rain water through limestone formation in the Niagara gorge, most notably the dolomite formation near the top of the Niagara Escarpment. This seepage causes carbonate minerals to dissolve out of the dolomite, changing them to a bicarbonate form. Below the dolomite the Rochester Shale is impenetrable to the seeping water, causing it to flow horizontal and emerge and run down the rock face of the gorge. Some of this water evaporates, leaving a layer of calcium carbonate and aragonite on the rock face. In some areas the accumulation is not much more than a thin film, but in other areas he notes it can be four or five centimeters thick.

== See also ==
- Flowstone – sheet-like carbonate deposit formed by water flowing over rock surfaces
- Jesuit Relations
- Native American ethnobotany
- Neutral Confederacy – Iroquoian people who inhabited the Niagara region in the 1640s
- Niagara Escarpment
- Niagara Gorge
- Traditional medicine
- Travertine
- Wendat people
