= Osodendron altissimum =

Scientific classification
- Kingdom: Plantae
- Clade: Tracheophytes
- Clade: Angiosperms
- Clade: Eudicots
- Clade: Rosids
- Order: Fabales
- Family: Fabaceae
- Genus: Osodendron
- Species: O. altissimum

Binomial name
- Osodendron altissimum (Hook.f.) E.J.M.Koenen (2022)

Synonyms
- Albizia altissima Hook.f. (1849); Arthrosamanea altissima (Hook.f.) G.C.C.Gilbert & Boutique (1952); Cathormion altissimum (Hook.f.) Hutch. & Dandy (1928); Feuilleea altissima (Hook.f.) Kuntze (1891); Inga altissima (Hook.f.) Roberty (1954), nom. illeg.; Pithecellobium altissimum (Hook.f.) Oliv. (1871)

Species of plant

Osodendron altissimum, formerly known as Albizia altissima, is a low branching tree within the Fabaceae family, it grows along river banks in the Lower and Upper Guinean and Congolian forests of west and central Africa.

== Description ==
A small to large sized tree that is capable of growing up to 35 meters tall and reaching 80 cm in diameter, it has a short and bent trunk. The bark is usually scaly and grey to brown in colour. Leaves are bipinnately compound, 5 - 7 pairs of pinnae, each pinnae with 12 - 25 leaflets, glands between the upper 2-3 pairs of pinnae. Leaf-blade, small sized, glabrous, 1 x 1.5 cm long and 3 x 4 mm wide. Flower: heads are white, flowers between September and January. Fruit, oblong pod, that breaks up into one seeded segments, red-brown to blackish in colour, comes out between March and May.

== Distribution ==
A riparian species, it commonly occurs in the freshwater swamp forest of Tropical West and Central Africa, and southwards towards Zambia and Mozambique. It also occurs in secondary forest zones.

== Subspecies ==
Two subspecies are accepted:

- Osodendron altissimum subsp. altissimum
- Osodendron altissimum subsp. busiraensis (G.C.C.Gilbert & Boutique) E.J.M.Koenen

== Uses ==
Bark extracts used to treat tooth and stomach ache in parts of Nigeria, fermented seed used as condiment. Leave decoction used to treat cold while some other plant extracts are used as a topical treatment of sores.. Wood used for local construction work and as a material used to make tool handles.
