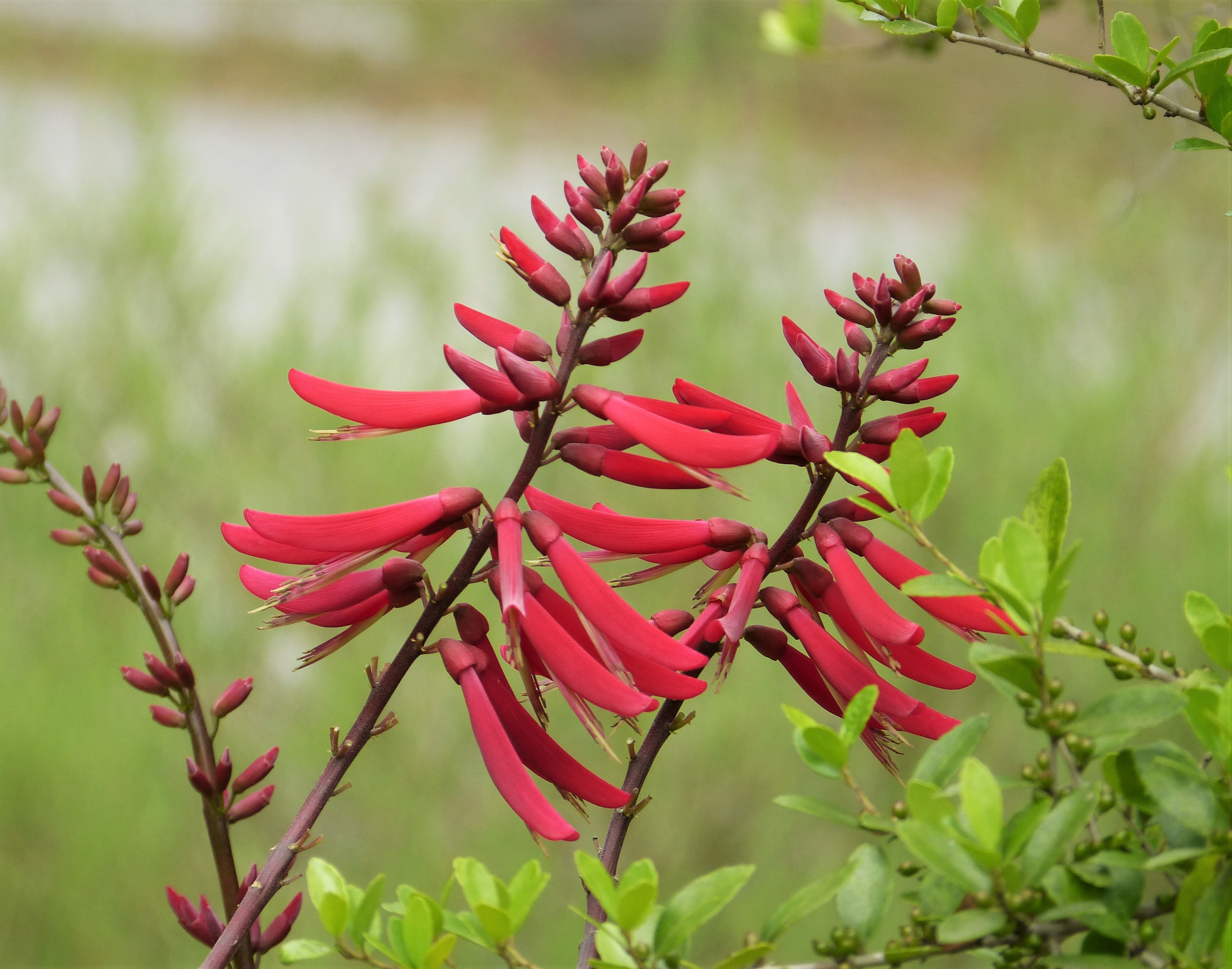

Conservation status
- Least Concern (IUCN 3.1)

- Secure (NatureServe)

Scientific classification
- Kingdom: Plantae
- Clade: Tracheophytes
- Clade: Angiosperms
- Clade: Eudicots
- Clade: Rosids
- Order: Fabales
- Family: Fabaceae
- Subfamily: Faboideae
- Genus: Erythrina
- Species: E. herbacea

Binomial name
- Erythrina herbacea L.
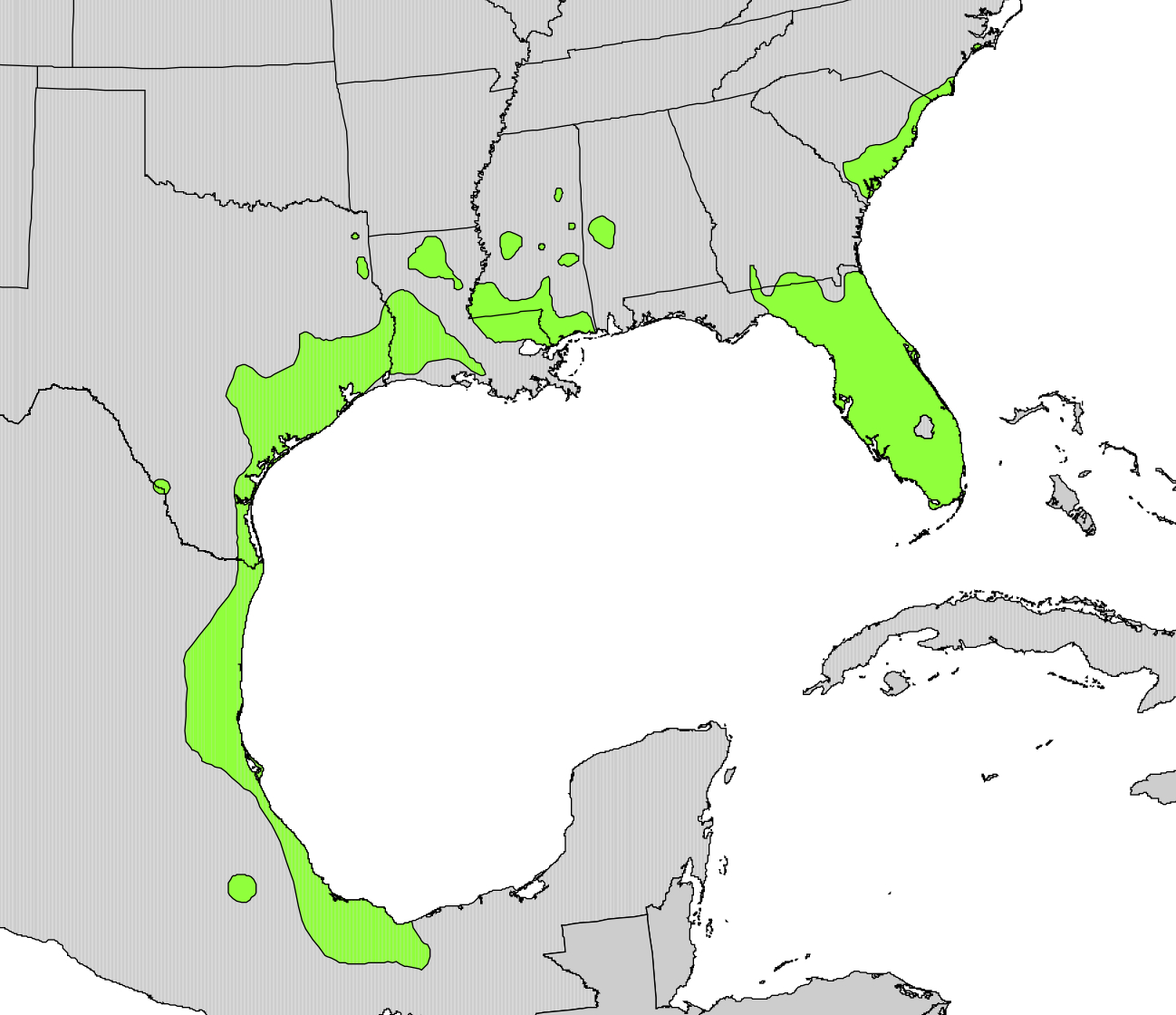
- Natural range

Synonyms
- Erythrina arborea Small

= Erythrina herbacea =

Species of legume

Erythrina herbacea, commonly known as the Eastern Coralbean, Cherokee Bean, Mamou in South Louisiana, Red Cardinal, or Cardinal Spear is a flowering shrub or small tree found throughout the southeastern United States and northeastern Mexico; it has also been reported from parts of Central America and, as an introduced species, from Pakistan. Various other systematic names have been used for this plant in the past, including Erythrina arborea, Erythrina hederifolia, Erythrina humilis, Erythrina rubicunda, Corallodendron herbaceum and Xyphanthus hederifolius.

== Description ==
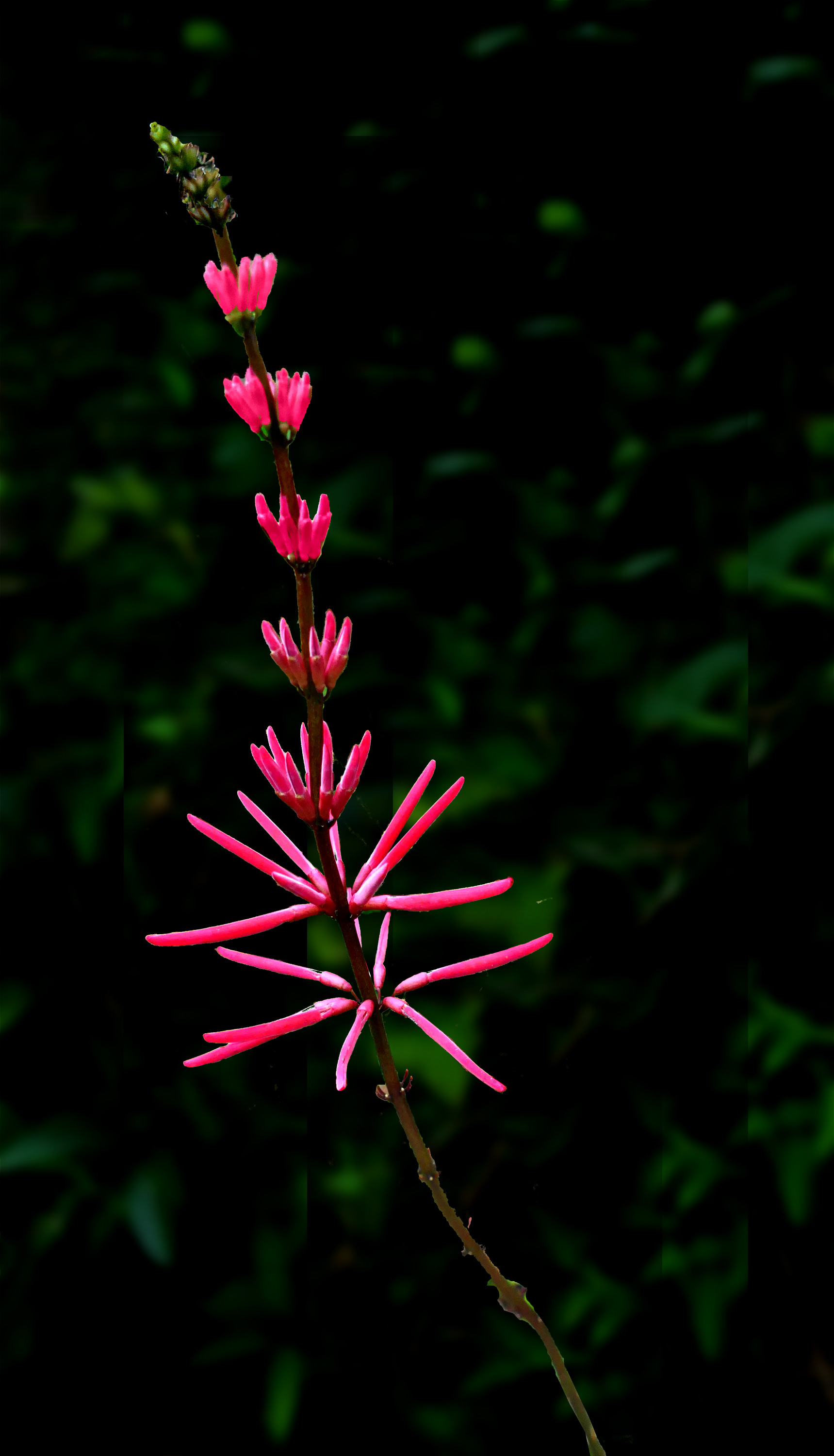
Coral bean or Cherokee bean or Red cardinal -- Erythrina herbacea

Coral bean grows as a low shrub or small tree, reaching around 5 m (16 ft) in height in areas that do not kill it back by freezing; elsewhere it may only reach 1.2 m (3.9 ft). Stems are covered in curved spines. The leaves are yellowish-green, 15–20 cm (5.9–7.9 in) long and 6 cm (2.4 in) wide. The leaves are divided into three 2.5–8 cm (0.98–3.15 in) arrowhead-shaped leaflets. The bark is smooth and light gray. The tubular flowers are bright red and grow in long spikes, each flower being 4–6.5 cm (1.6–2.6 in) long; the tree blooms from April to July. They are followed by 5–10 cm (2.0–3.9 in) pods containing bright red seeds, from which the tree gets its name. The plant forms a woody caudex. Toxic alkaloids, including erysopine, erysothiopine, erysothiovine, erysovine, erythrinine, erythroresin, coralin, erythric acid, and hypaphorine, are found throughout the plant. The leaves were found to contain erysotrine and erythrartine. These cause paralysis upon ingestion, much like curare.

== Habitat and range ==
Coral bean grows best in sandy soils and has moderate salt tolerance. It is found in open woods, forest clearings, hammocks, and disturbed areas. In the United States, it ranges from southeastern North Carolina south to Florida and west to southeastern Oklahoma and eastern Texas. E. herbacea inhabits Tamaulipas in Mexico.

Erythrina herbacea is also found in some areas of the Dragoon Mountains in Southern Arizona, located around areas of the Cochise Stronghold and other older Indian remnants. It was most likely introduced through trade from the Mogollon culture that existed in the area from 150 AD to 1400 AD, and possibly even the later Apache Indians who occupied the area in the 19th century. Further research of the surrounding area is needed for range confirmation.

== Uses ==
Erythrina herbacea can be readily grown in gardens within its natural range. Although its use in gardens is not particularly common, it is popular among those who do grow it as a source of early season color, for its hardiness (USDA Zones 7-10), and because it attracts hummingbirds.

Native American people had many medicinal uses for this plant, varying between nations and localities. Creek women used an infusion of the root for bowel pain; the Choctaw used a decoction of the leaves as a general tonic; the Seminole used an extract of the roots for digestive problems, and extracts of the seeds, or of the inner bark, as an external rub for rheumatic disorders.

In Mexico, the seeds are used as a rat poison, while a fish poison is made from the bark and leaves.

In some Central American countries the flowers are used in traditional cuisine. Mostly added to bean soup or meat patties, it is known for its mild narcotic properties.
