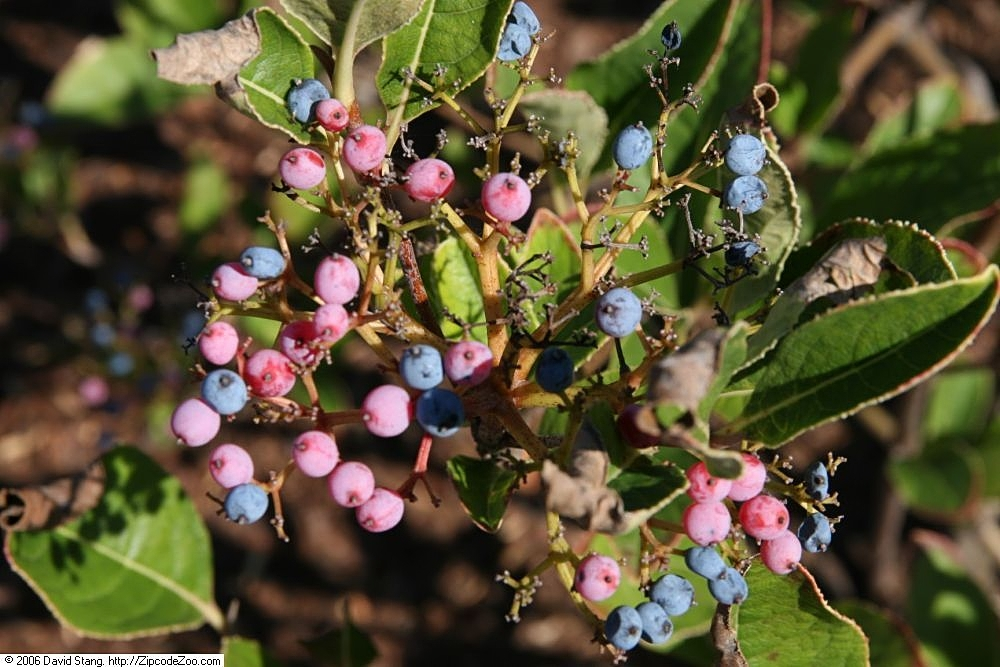

Conservation status
- Least Concern (IUCN 3.1)

Scientific classification
- Kingdom: Plantae
- Clade: Embryophytes
- Clade: Tracheophytes
- Clade: Spermatophytes
- Clade: Angiosperms
- Clade: Eudicots
- Clade: Asterids
- Order: Dipsacales
- Family: Viburnaceae
- Genus: Viburnum
- Species: V. nudum

Binomial name
- Viburnum nudum L.

= Viburnum nudum =

Species of shrub

Viburnum nudum is a deciduous shrub in the genus Viburnum within the family Viburnaceae (it was formerly part of the family Caprifoliaceae).

One variety of the species is Viburnum nudum var. cassinoides; synonyms for this variety Viburnum nitidum Aiton, Viburnum cassinoides, Viburnum cassinoides var. harbisonii, Viburnum cassinoides var. nitidum, and Viburnum nitidum.

Common names for the plant include withe-rod, witherod viburnum, possumhaw, and wild raisin.

== Description ==
Viburnum nudum is a shrub with opposite, simple leaves, on slender stems. The flowers are white, borne in late spring.

== Range ==
It is native to North America from southern Ontario and Quebec to Newfoundland, south to Florida, and west to Wisconsin.

It has been observed in habitats such as floodplains, hardwood stands, mesic woodlands, and in pine flatwoods.

== Ecology ==
The fruit is eaten by wildlife, and deer browse the foliage. It is a larval host to spring azures and hummingbird clearwing moths.

== Conservation status in the United States ==
It is listed as endangered in Kentucky and Pennsylvania and as special concern species and believed extirpated in Connecticut.

== Native American ethnobotany ==
=== Cuisine ===
The Abenaki use the fruit and the grains of var. cassinoides for food. The Algonquin people eat the berries of var. cassinoides.

=== Medicinal use ===
The Cherokee have several medicinal uses for Viburnum nudum var. cassinoides. They take an infusion of it to prevent recurrent spasms, use the root bark as a diaphoretic and a tonic, and take a compound infusion of it for fever, smallpox and ague. They also use an infusion of the bark as a wash for a sore tongue.

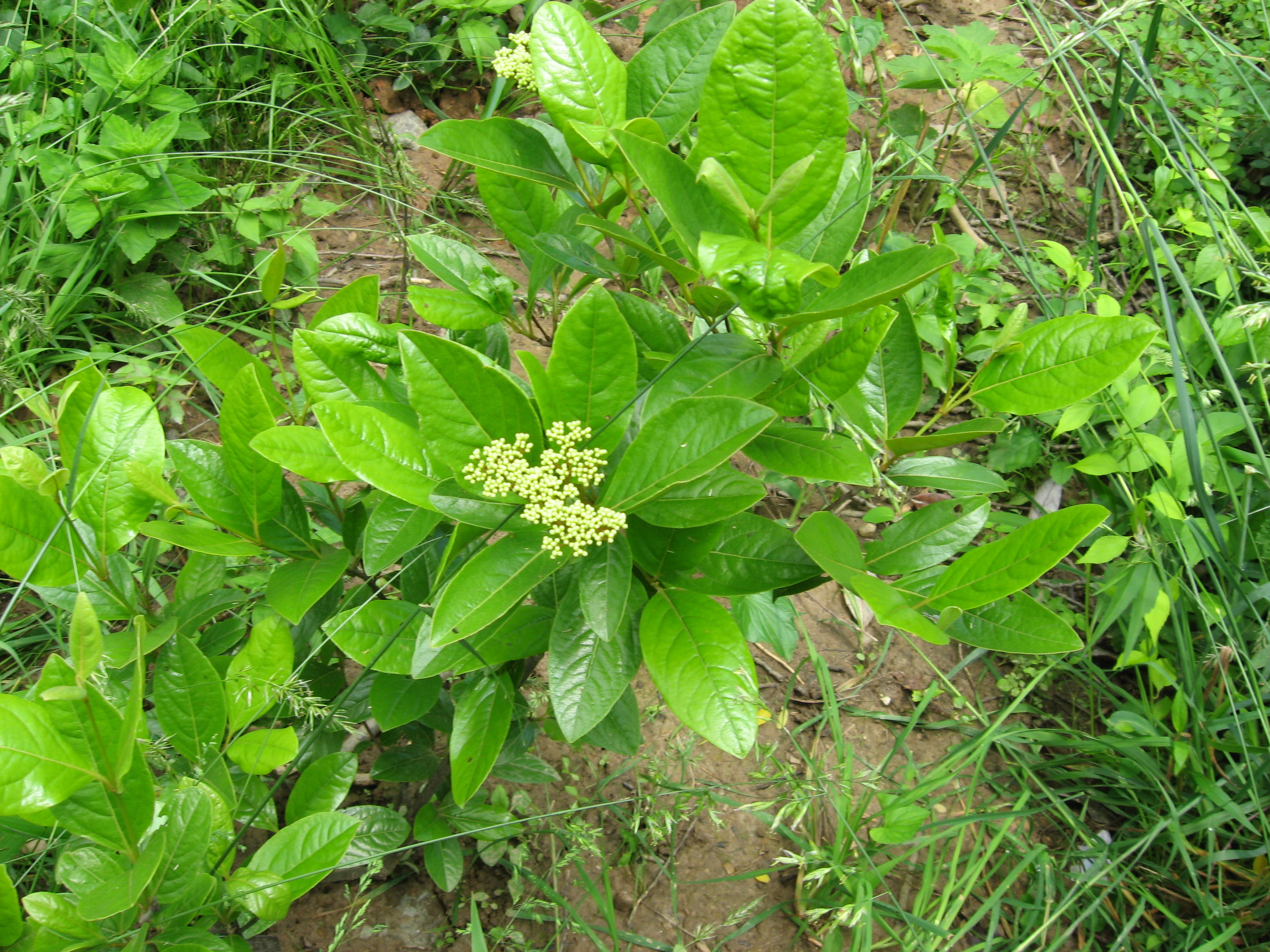
Foliage and flowers

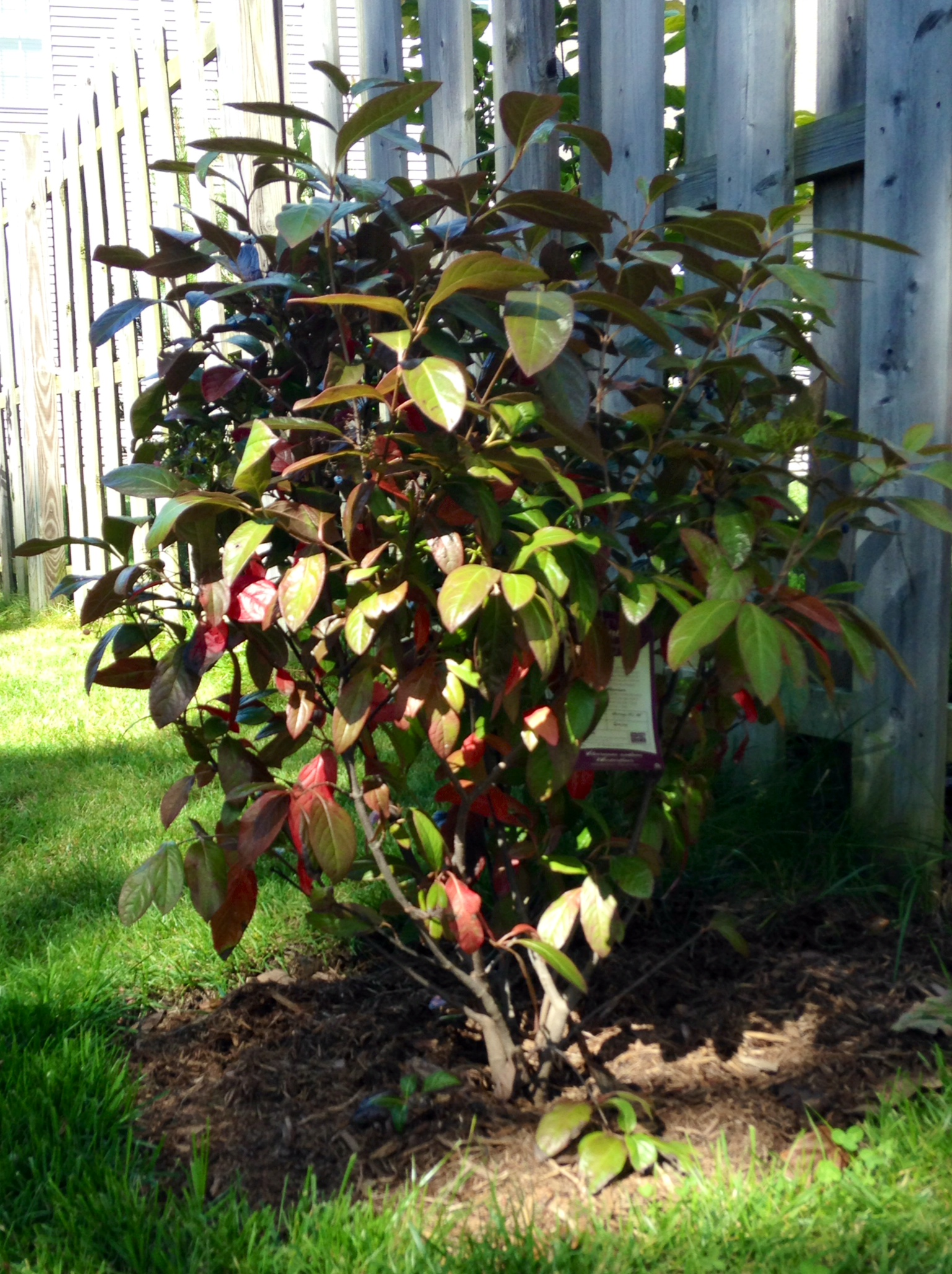
"Winterthur" foliage in early Fall

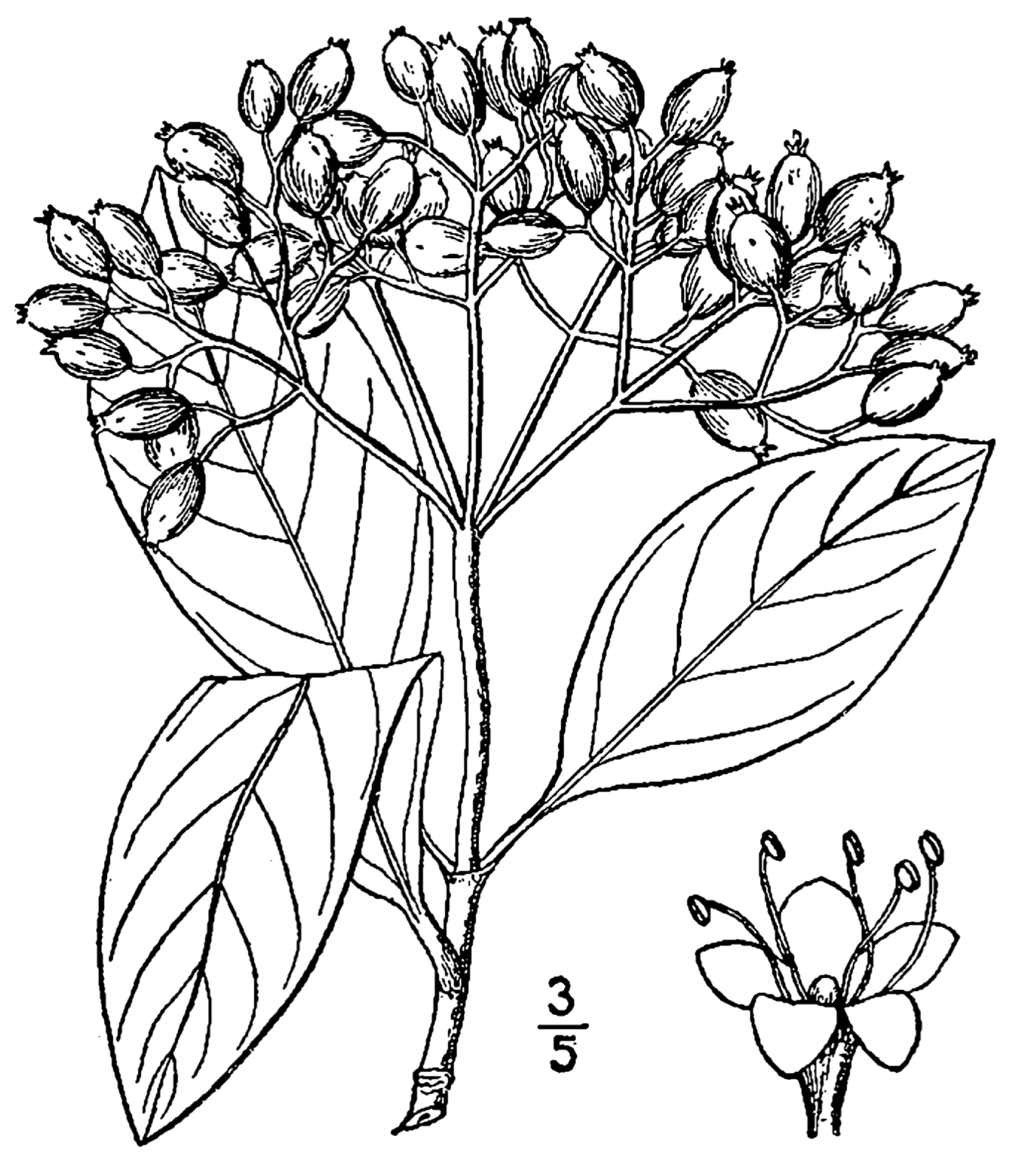
1913 Illustration
