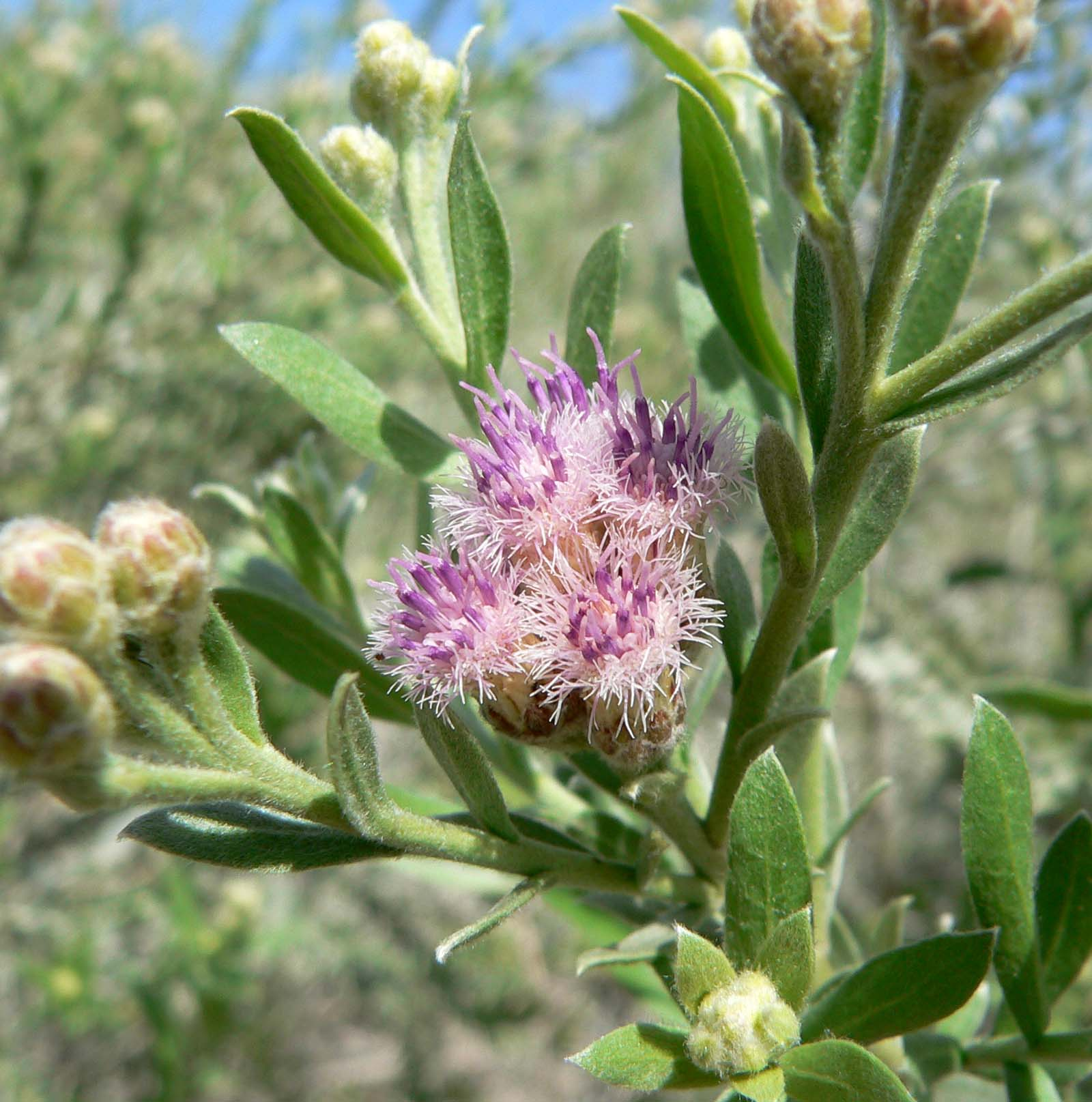

Scientific classification
- Kingdom: Plantae
- Clade: Tracheophytes
- Clade: Angiosperms
- Clade: Eudicots
- Clade: Asterids
- Order: Asterales
- Family: Asteraceae
- Genus: Pluchea
- Species: P. sericea

Binomial name
- Pluchea sericea Nutt.

= Pluchea sericea =

Species of plant

Pluchea sericea, commonly called arrowweed or cachanilla (Mexico), is a rhizomatous evergreen shrub of riparian areas in the lower Sonoran Desert and surrounding areas. It is common in the lower Colorado River valley of California, Nevada and Arizona, as far east as Texas, and in northern Mexico where it often forms dense impenetrable thickets. It is a perennial shrub and grows along watercourses.

== Uses ==
It was once used medicinally by Native Americans as an antidiarrheal and eyewash. Other traditional uses include thatching, arrowmaking and food, especially the edible root.

In other uses, the gum resin that exudes from the plant was used by the Papago Indians to make a mending glue on broken pottery.
