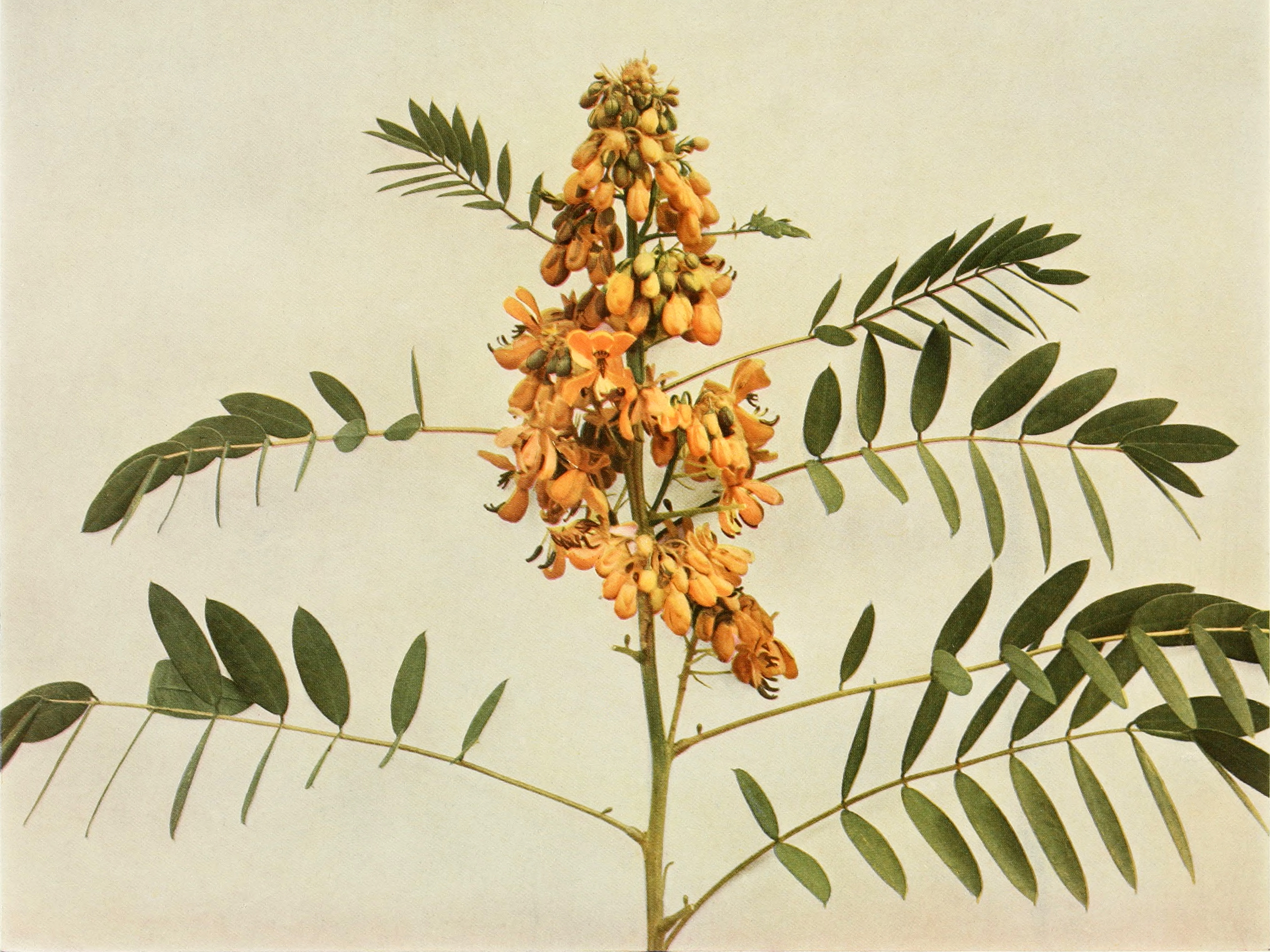

Conservation status
- Secure (NatureServe)

Scientific classification
- Kingdom: Plantae
- Clade: Tracheophytes
- Clade: Angiosperms
- Clade: Eudicots
- Clade: Rosids
- Order: Fabales
- Family: Fabaceae
- Subfamily: Caesalpinioideae
- Genus: Senna
- Species: S. hebecarpa

Binomial name
- Senna hebecarpa (Fernald) H.S.Irwin & Barneby

Synonyms
- Cassia hebecarpa Fernald; Cassia hebecarpa Fernald var. longipila E.L. Braun; Senna hebecarpa (Fernald) Irwin & Barneby var. longipila (E.L. Braun) C.F. Reed

= Senna hebecarpa =

Species of legume

Senna hebecarpa, with the common names American senna and wild senna, is a species of legume native to eastern North America.

== Description ==
Senna hebecarpa grows as a sparsely branched perennial plant. It has alternate, compound leaves.

Clusters of light yellow to orange flowers bloom from July to August in North America.

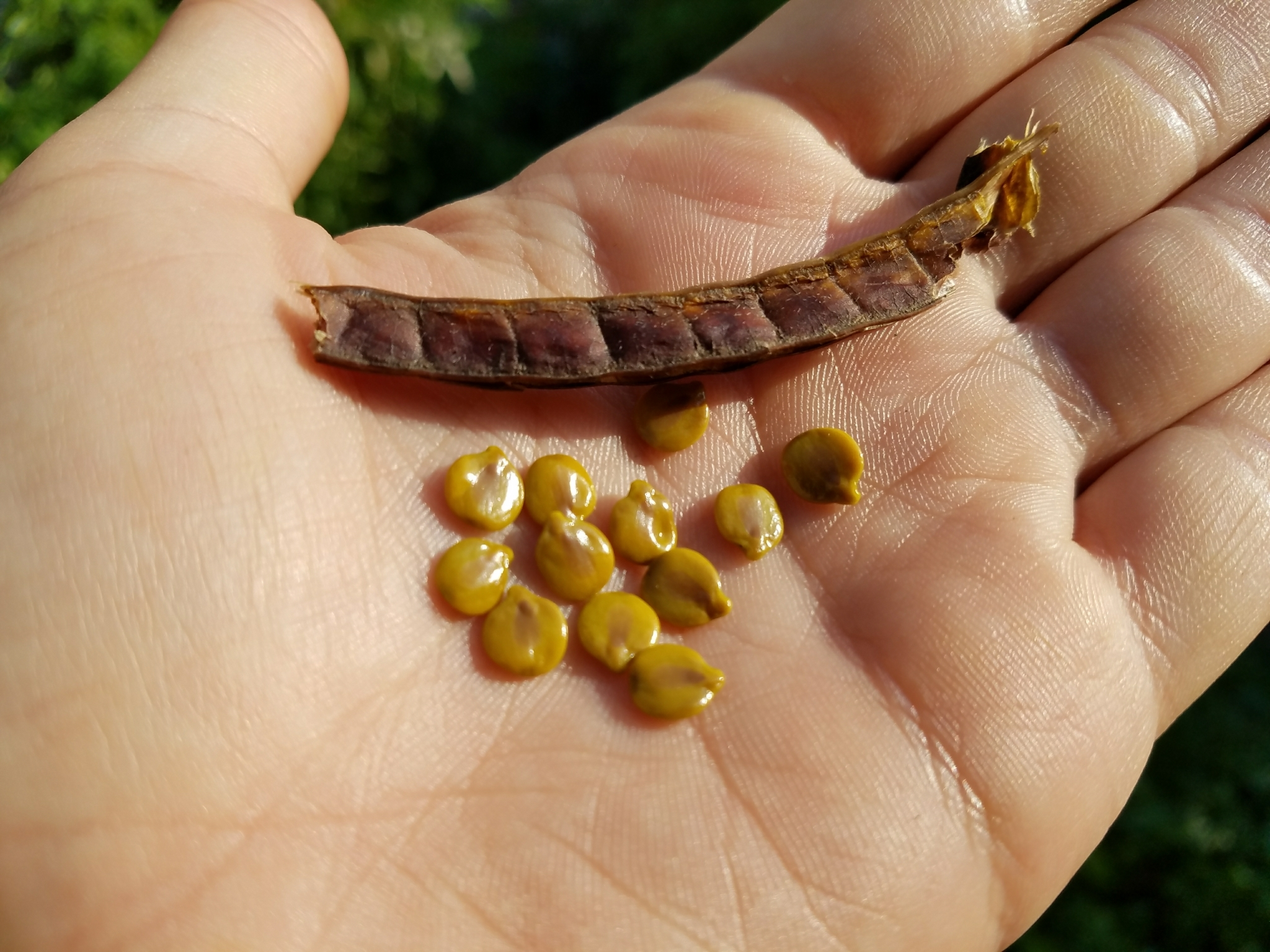
Fruit and seeds

== Distribution and habitat ==
The plant is found from the Great Lakes region and Maine southwards through the Eastern United States, in the Appalachian Mountains and Atlantic Plains, to Georgia.

It is found in moist open woodlands, and in disturbed areas.

== Ecology ==
It is a larval host and nectar source for the Cloudless Giant Sulphur (Phoebis sennae) butterfly. It is also of special value to native bumble bees.

== Conservation status in the United States ==
It is listed as endangered in Massachusetts and New Hampshire, threatened in Vermont, historical in Rhode Island, and threatened in Connecticut.

== Uses ==
Senna hebecarpa is cultivated as an ornamental plant, for use as a perennial wildflower and flowering shrub in traditional and wildlife gardens, in natural landscaping projects, and for habitat restoration projects.

=== Native American ethnobotany ===
The Cherokee use an infusion of the plant for various purposes, including taking it for cramps, heart trouble, giving it to children and adults as a purgative and for fever, and taking it for 'blacks' (hands and eye sockets turn black). They also give an infusion of the root specifically to children for fever. They use a poultice of the root for sores, and they use a compound infusion for fainting spells. They also use a compound for pneumonia. The Haudenosaunee use the plant as a worm remedy and take a compound decoction as a laxative.
