= Osodendron =

Scientific classification
- Kingdom: Plantae
- Clade: Tracheophytes
- Clade: Angiosperms
- Clade: Eudicots
- Clade: Rosids
- Order: Fabales
- Family: Fabaceae
- Genus: Osodendron; E.J.M.Koenen (2022)

Genus of plants

Osodendron is a genus of flowering plants in the pea family (Fabaceae). It contains three species which are native to tropical Africa.

== Species ==
Three species are accepted:

- Osodendron altissimum (Hook.f.) E.J.M.Koenen
- Osodendron dinklagei (Harms) E.J.M.Koenen
- Osodendron leptophyllum (Harms) E.J.M.Koenen
