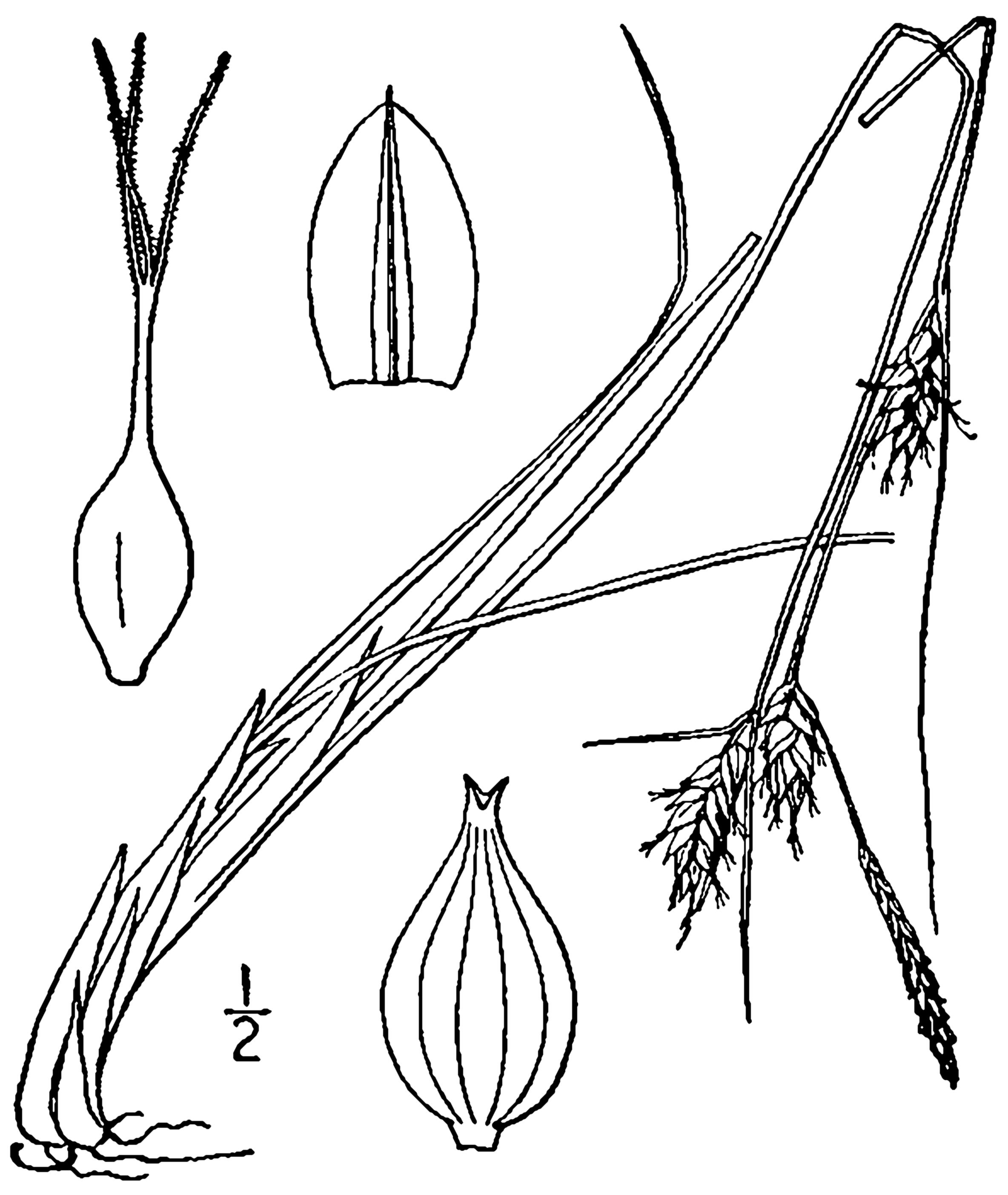
- 1913 botanical illustration
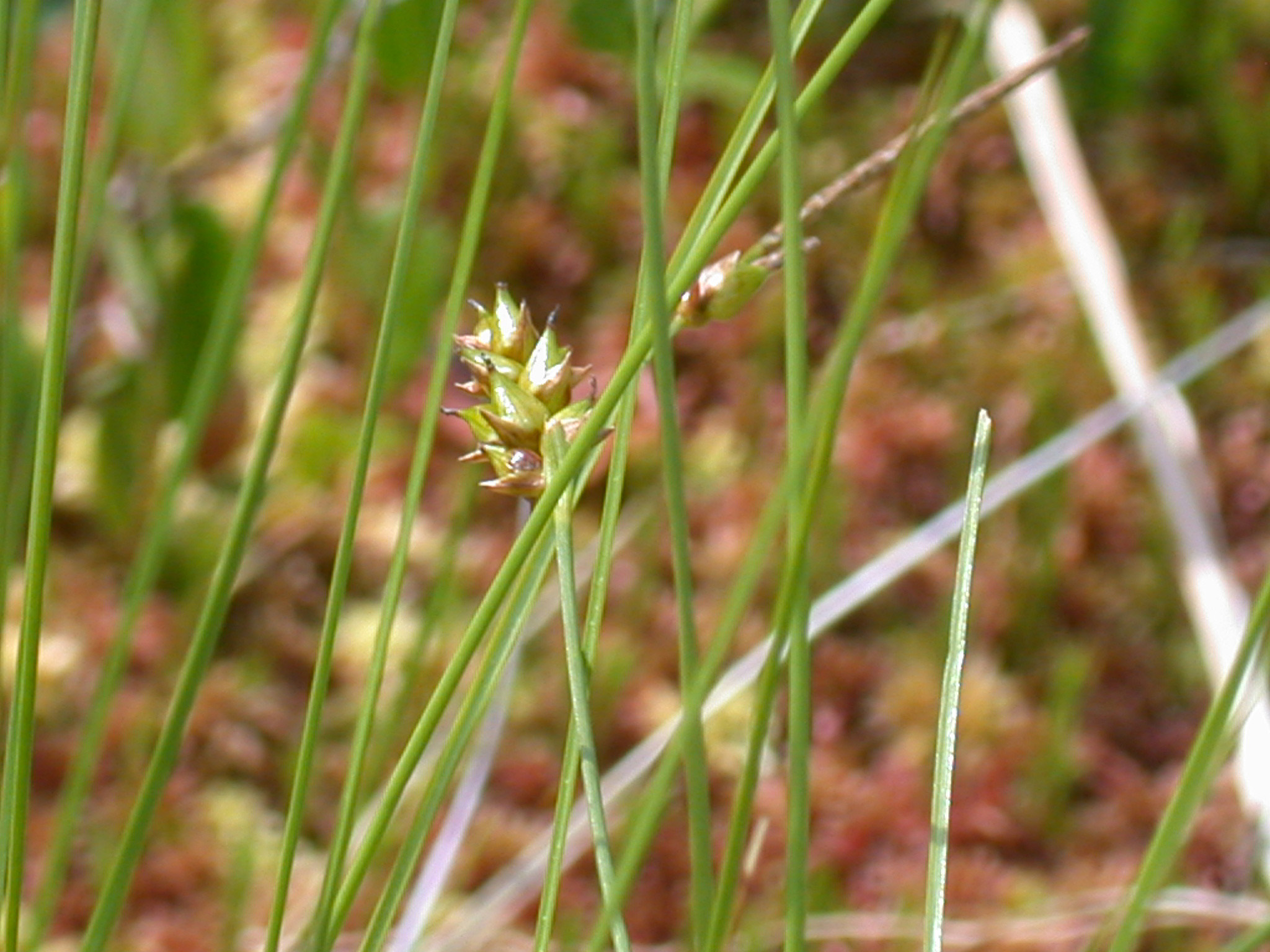

Conservation status
- Least Concern (IUCN 3.1)

Scientific classification
- Kingdom: Plantae
- Clade: Tracheophytes
- Clade: Angiosperms
- Clade: Monocots
- Clade: Commelinids
- Order: Poales
- Family: Cyperaceae
- Genus: Carex
- Section: Carex sect. Vesicariae
- Species: C. oligosperma

Binomial name
- Carex oligosperma Michx.

= Carex oligosperma =

Species of grass-like plant

Carex oligosperma, common name fewseed sedge, few-seeded sedge, and few-fruited sedge, is a perennial plant in the Carex genus. A distinct variety, Carex oligosperma var. oligosperma, exists.

== Conservation status ==
It is a species of special concern and believed extirpated in Connecticut, It is endangered in Illinois, Massachusetts, and North Carolina, and threatened in Ohio and Pennsylvania.

== Native American ethnobotany ==
The Haudenosaunee take a compound decoction of the plant as an emetic before running or playing lacrosse.
