= Kashayam =

Ayurveda term

Alternative medicine
- Culture: Ayurveda

Kashayam (Sanskrit: kaṣāyaṁ) is an Ayurveda term and does not denote any one particular Ayurvedic medicine, but a generic term for various types of medicinal concoction in Ayurveda. Kashayam refers to a water decoction or water extract of a single herb or group of herbs and can be used for ailments like indigestion, cough and common cold etc. It is an ancient form of medicine that has been used for a long time. Many are very bitter in taste and the liquid is dark in color. It is mainly used by Kerala, Karnataka, Tamil Nadu, Andhra Pradesh, Telangana and West Bengal states. It is also called Kwath or Kadha in other cultures in India.

== Ingredients ==
Many readily used kitchen spices and herbs like tulsi, ginger, neem leaves, cinnamon, cloves, long pepper and pepper etc. are used in preparing kashayam. people also use cumin seeds for digestion issues, carom seeds for cough
