= Eyewash =

Fluid used in the aid of rinsing of the eye

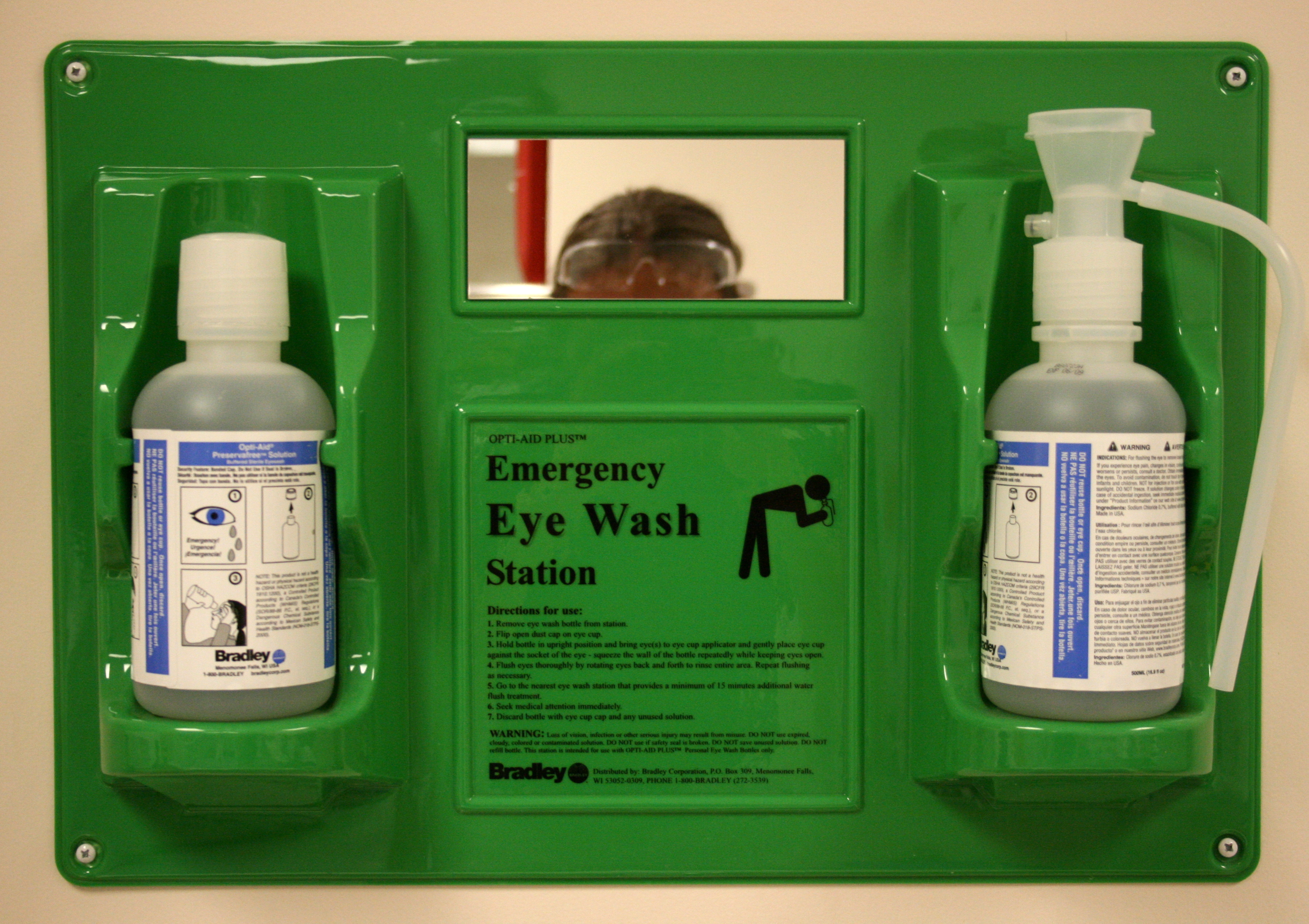
An eye wash station in a laboratory

Eyewash is a fluid, commonly saline, used to physically wash the eyes in the case that they may be contaminated by foreign materials or substances.

Eyewashes may be beneficial to those with sensitive eyes and can provide relief to the painful side effects of sensitivity. However, prolonged usage of such products will cause mild side effects, such as the reddening of the eye and/or pupil and cause itchiness.

== Occupational safety ==
In the United States, the Occupational Safety and Health Administration (OSHA) was created as a result of the Occupational Safety and Health Act of 1970. The law was created to help further protect employee safety while providing "safe & healthful working conditions." OSHA's primary eyewash standard, 29 CFR 1910.151 states, "where the eyes or body of any person may be exposed to injurious corrosive materials, suitable facilities for quick drenching or flushing of the eyes and body shall be provided within the work area for immediate emergency use."

These suitable facilities include fixed-point eye wash stations (which are especially recommended for risk of chemical burns to eyes) and emergency eye wash stations.

OSHA provides additional regulations for battery charging stations in 29 CFR 1926.441(a)(6) "Facilities for quick drenching of the eyes and body shall be provided within 25 feet (7.62 m) of battery handling areas."

Compliance with eyewash stations regulations is a component of OSHA inspections.
