= Infusion =

Process of extracting chemical compounds or flavors from plant material in a solvent

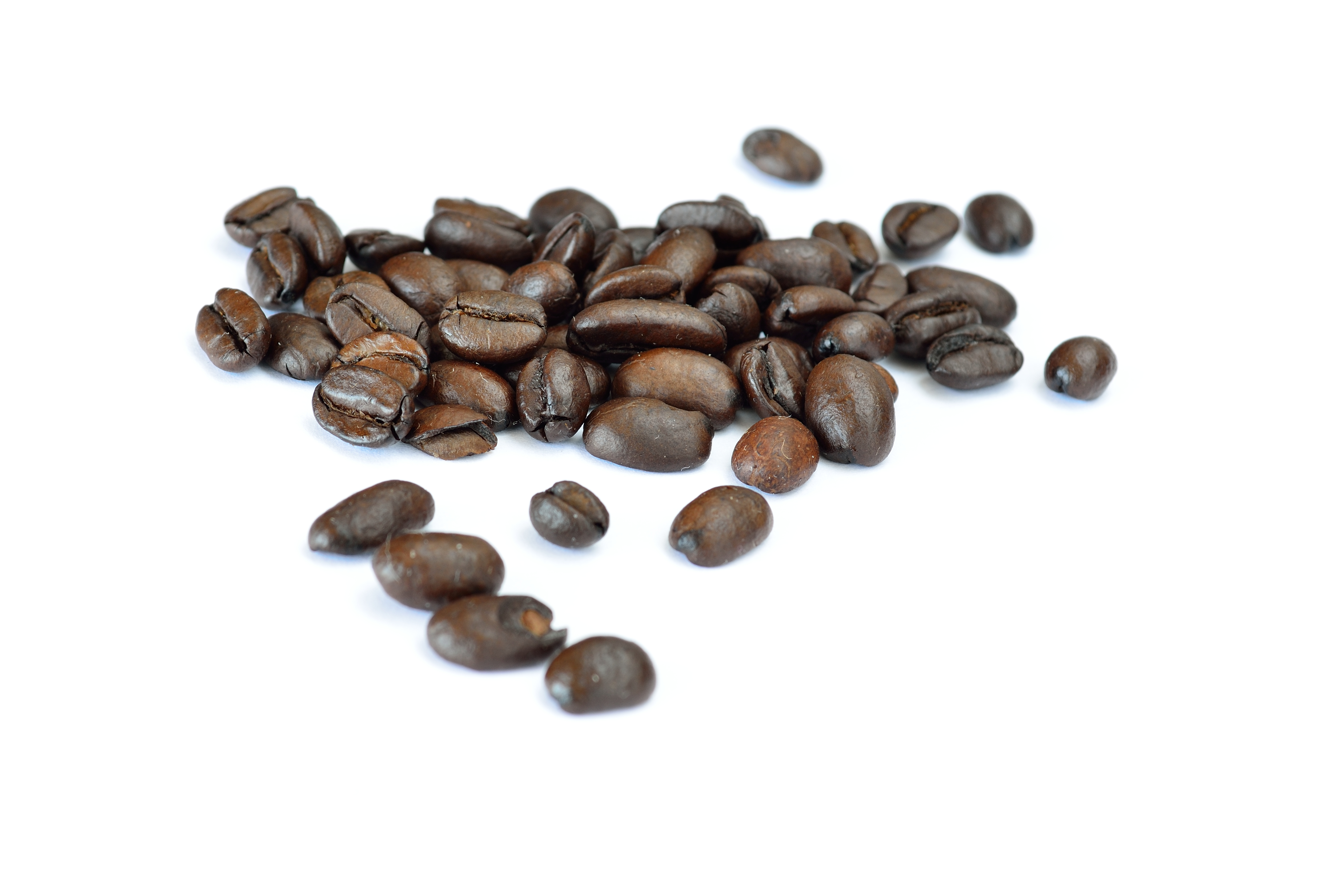
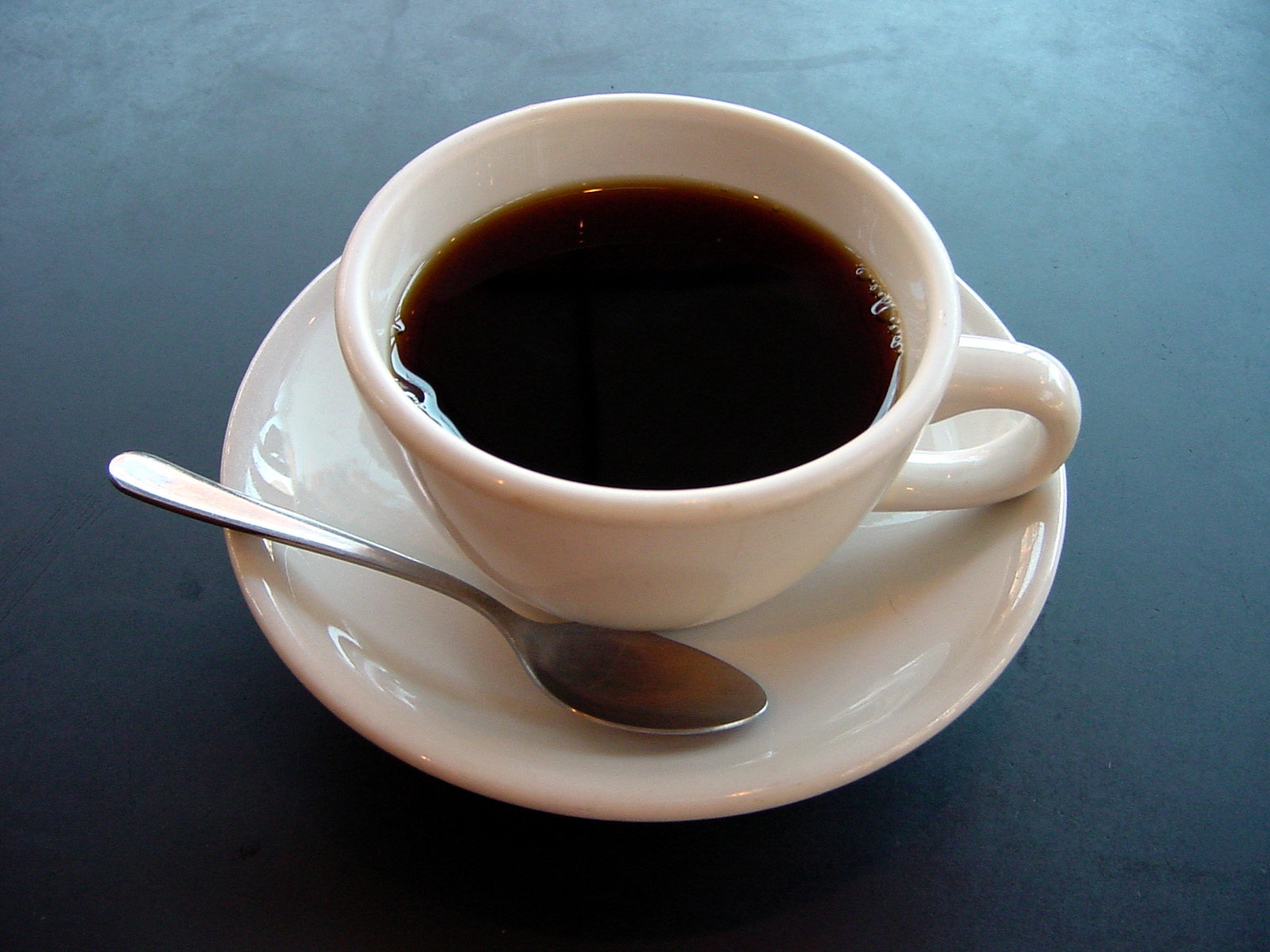
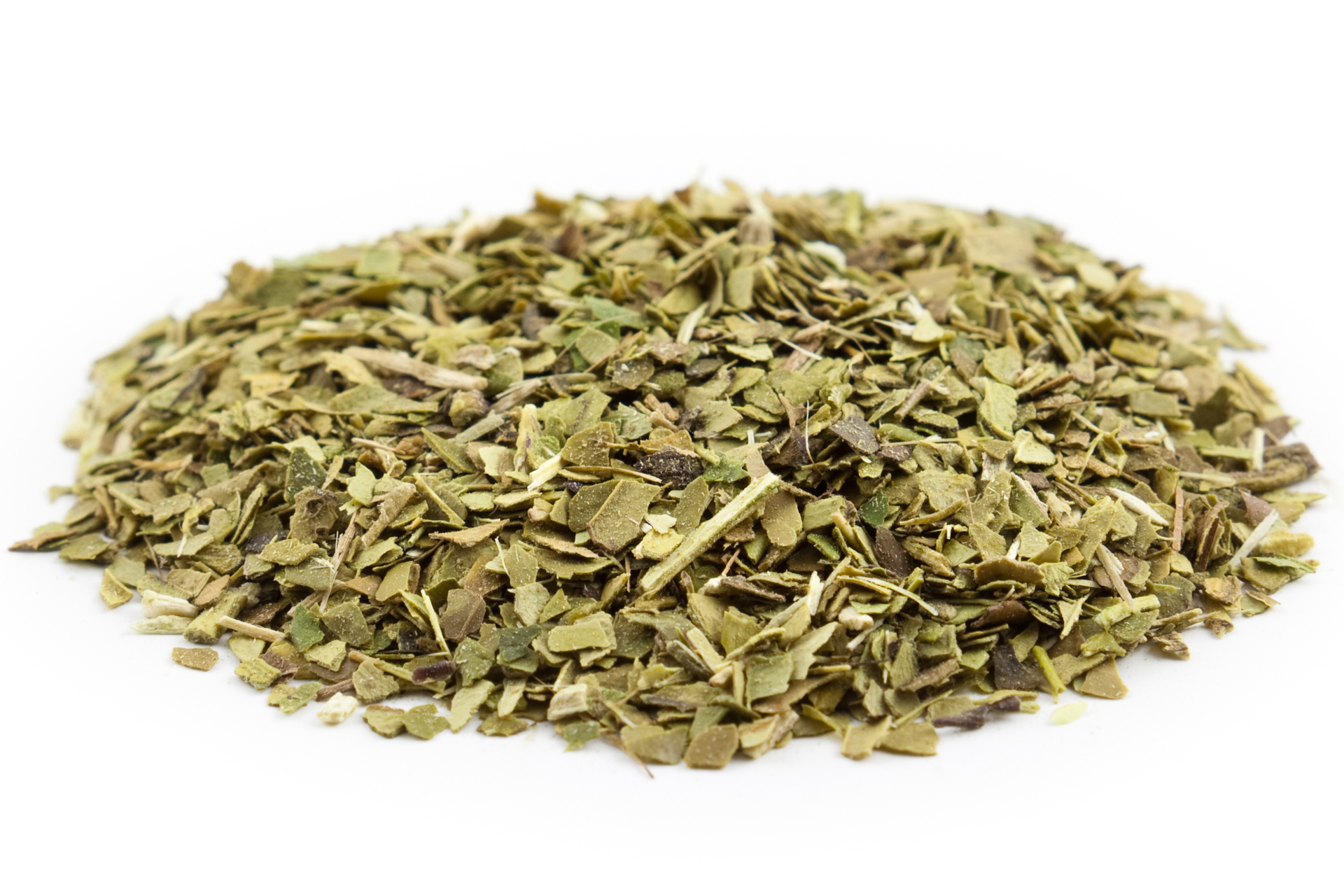
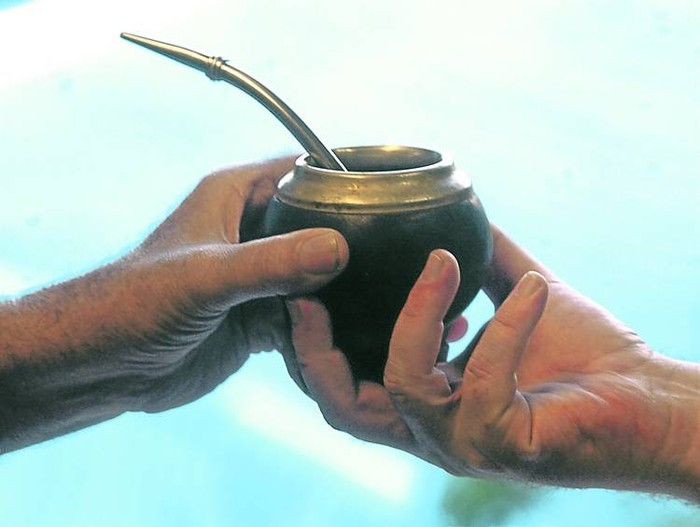
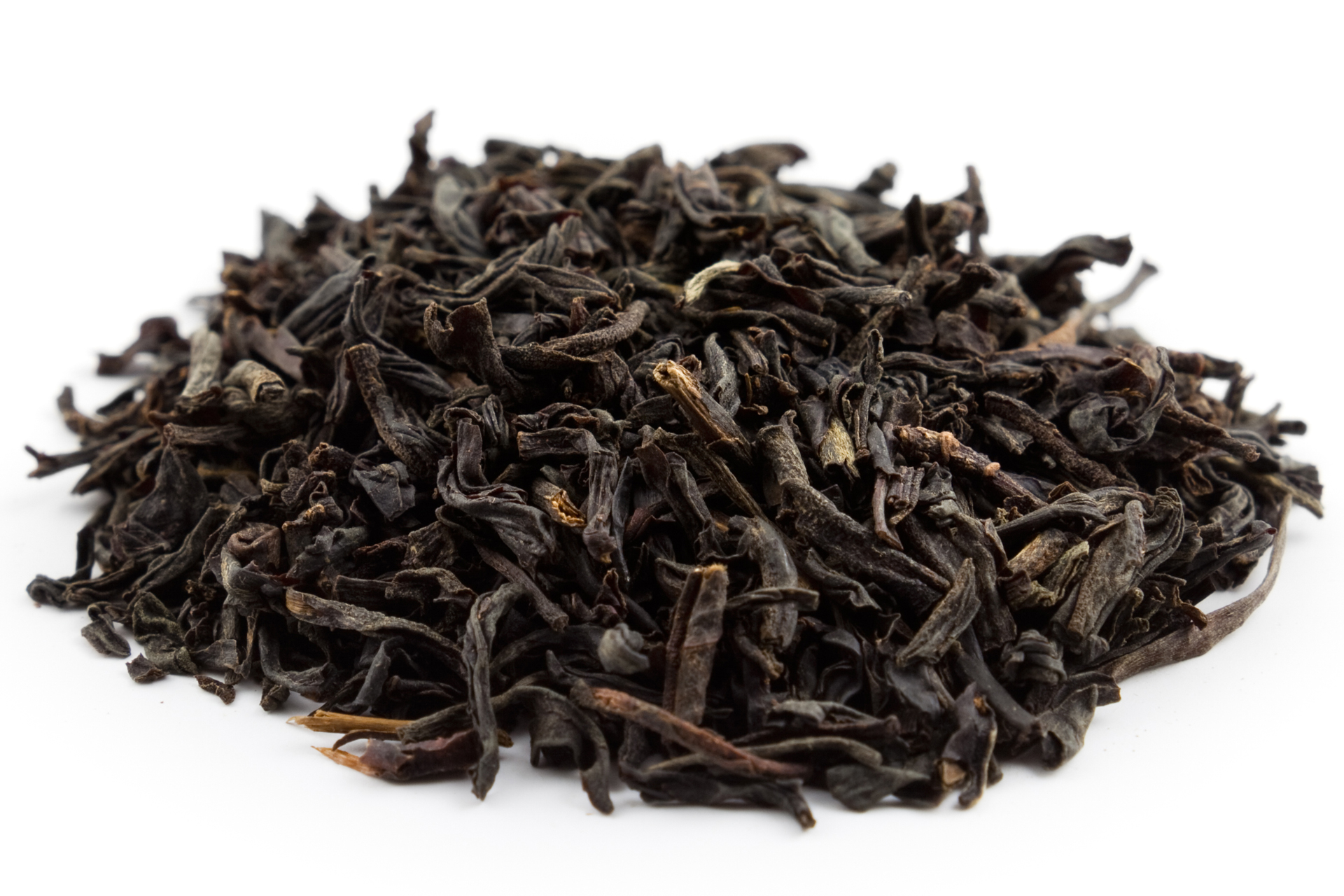
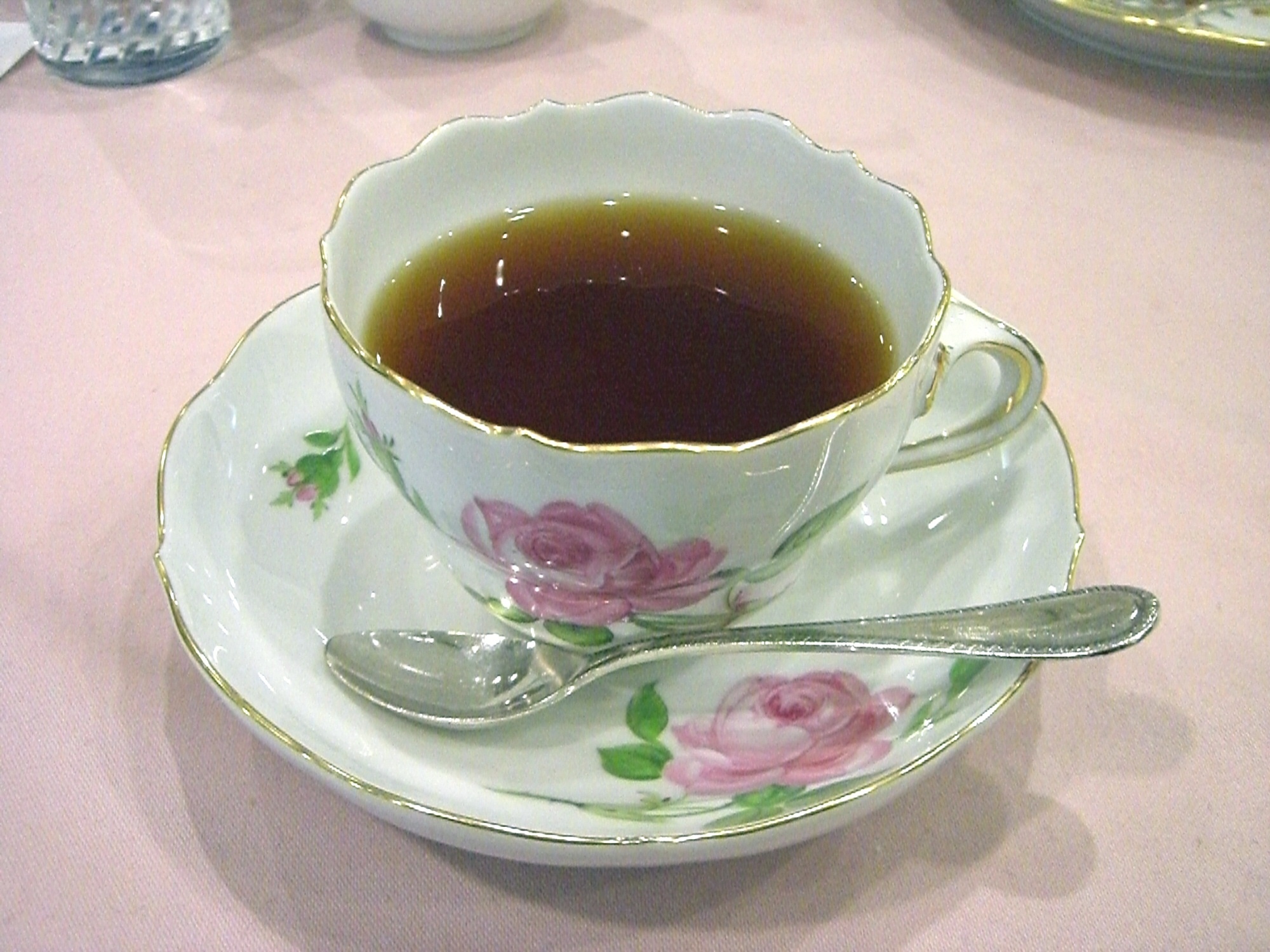
Three popular drinks that are infusions: coffee, mate and tea

Infusion is the process of extracting chemical compounds or flavors from plant material in a solvent – such as water, oil, or alcohol –, by allowing the material to remain suspended in the solvent over time (a process often called steeping). "Infusion" is also the name for the resultant fluid mixture. The process of infusion is distinct from both decoction, a method of extraction involving boiling the plant material, and percolation, in which water is passed through the material (as in a coffeemaker).

== History ==
The first recorded use of essential oils was in the 10th or 11th century by the Persian polymath Avicenna, possibly in The Canon of Medicine.

Tea is far older than this, dating back to the 10th century BC as the earliest recorded reference.

== Preparation techniques ==
Infusion is a chemical process that uses botanicals (typically dried herbs, flowers or berries) that are volatile and release their active ingredients readily in water, oil, or alcohol. In this process, a liquid is typically boiled (or brought to another appropriate temperature) and poured over the herb. After the herb has been allowed to steep in the liquid for an appropriate period of time, it is removed (possibly by straining) leaving an infusion. Unless the infusion is to be consumed immediately, it is bottled and refrigerated for future use.

The amount of time the herbs are left in the liquid depends on the kind of infusion. Infusion times can range from seconds (for some kinds of Chinese tea) to hours, days, or months (for liqueurs like sloe gin).

There are several accessories and techniques for removing the steeped or leftover botanicals that were used to infuse liquids, including metal steepers (which look like clamps), tea infusers (which act as strainers), and French presses (which are commonly used to infuse water with various teas and coffee). The most commonly used technique is the teabag, which is made with filter paper and filled with various tea flavors.

== Examples ==
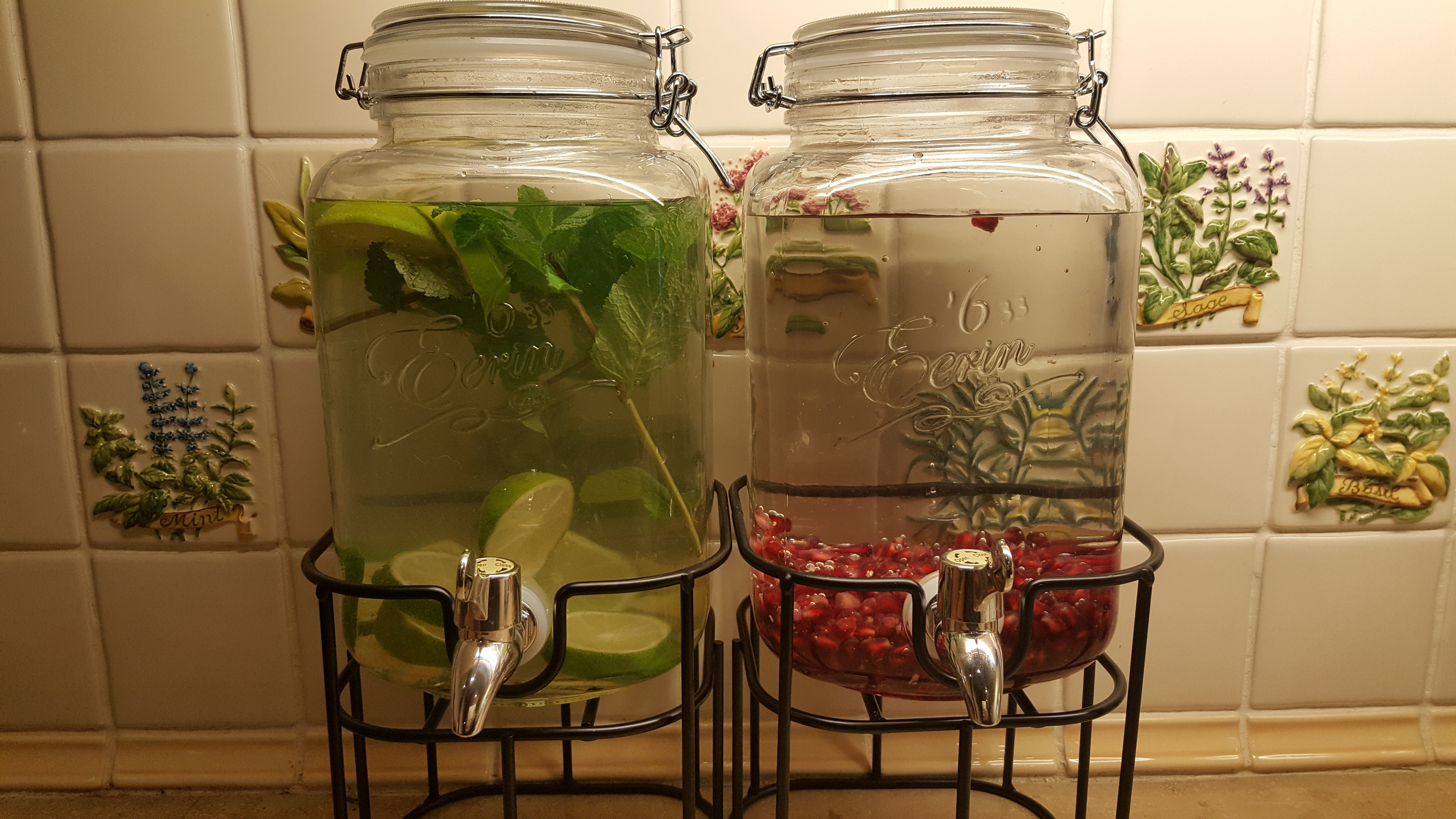
Left side: Lime, ginger and mint infused water; Right side: Pomegranate infused water

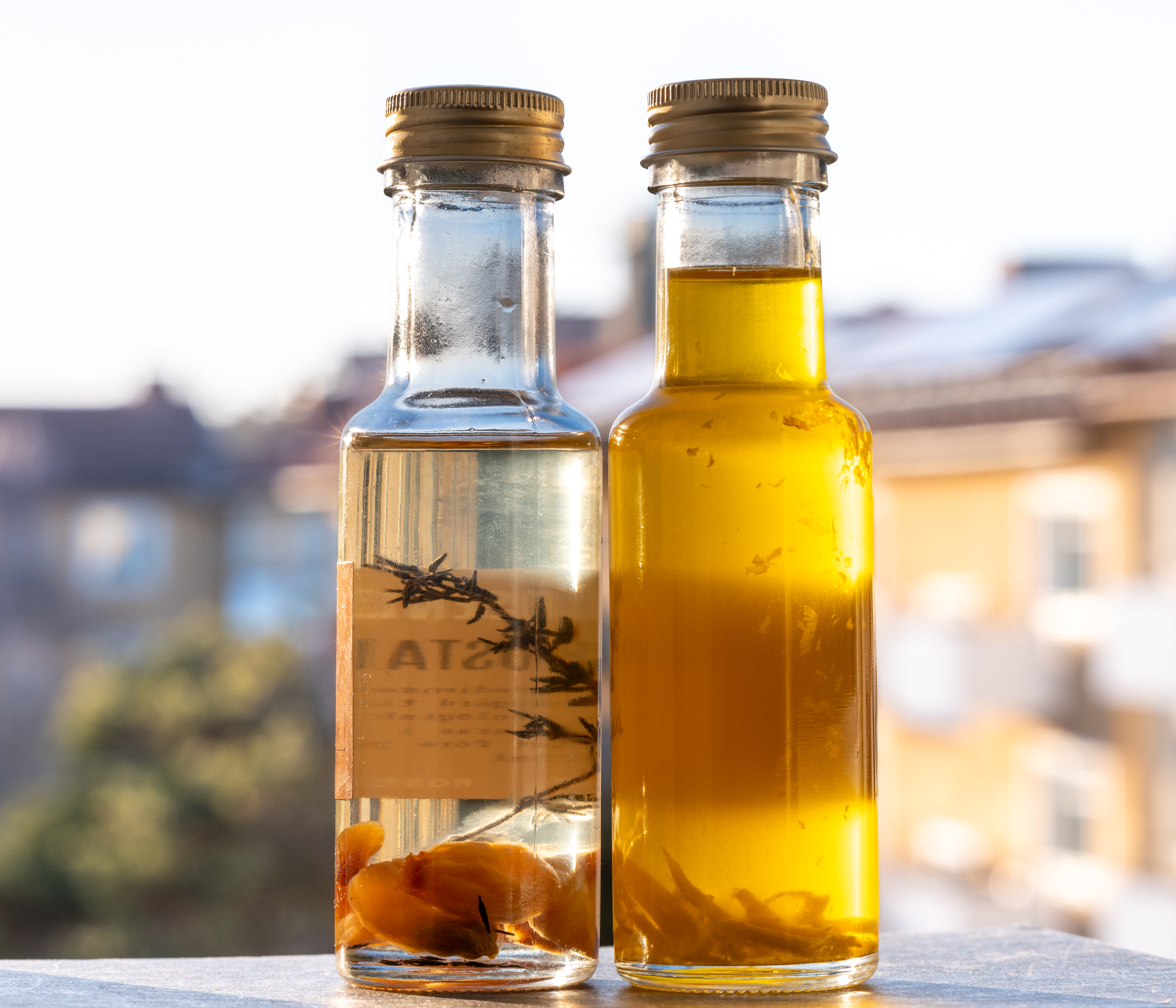
Olive oil infused with roasted garlic (left) and lemon (right).

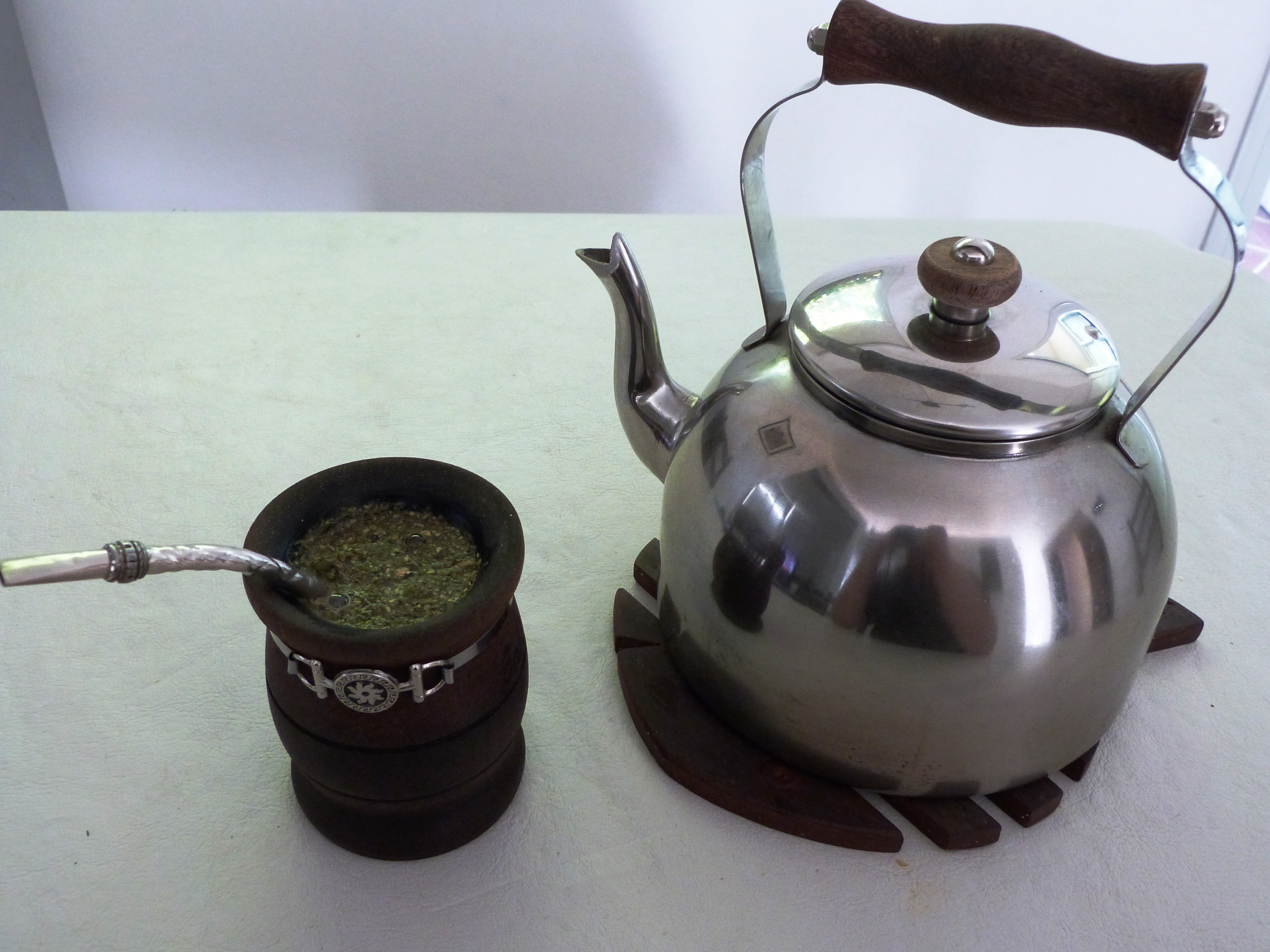
Mate

- Tea is a common example of an infusion; most varieties of tea call for steeping the leaves in hot water, although some variants (e.g. Moroccan mint tea) call for decoction instead. Many herbal teas are prepared by infusion, as well; lemon, chamomile, senna, apple, ginger, rooibos, and many other plants are used individually or in combination.
- Coffee can be brewed by infusion (as in a French press) or percolation.
- Herbal remedies are commonly produced through infusions in water or oil.
- Flavored oils: Plants with desirable flavors may be steeped in an edible oil or vinegar for an extended period; the infused oil or vinegar is often sold still containing the plant and is then used as flavoring. Chilis, lemon, garlic, and many other plants may be used. There can be ambiguity in the labeling of these oils: for example, what is described as sesame oil may be oil extracted from sesame seeds or another vegetable oil infused with sesame.
- Cucumber water, a mix of sliced cucumber with citrus slices and herbs such as mint, is a popular infusion.

== See also ==
- Mate
- Aromatherapy
- Chinese herbology
- Decoction
- Herbalism
- List of cooking techniques
- Tincture
- Maceration (food)
- Percolation
- Coffee steeping
