= Decoction =

Extraction by boiling herbal or plant material to dissolve the chemicals of the material

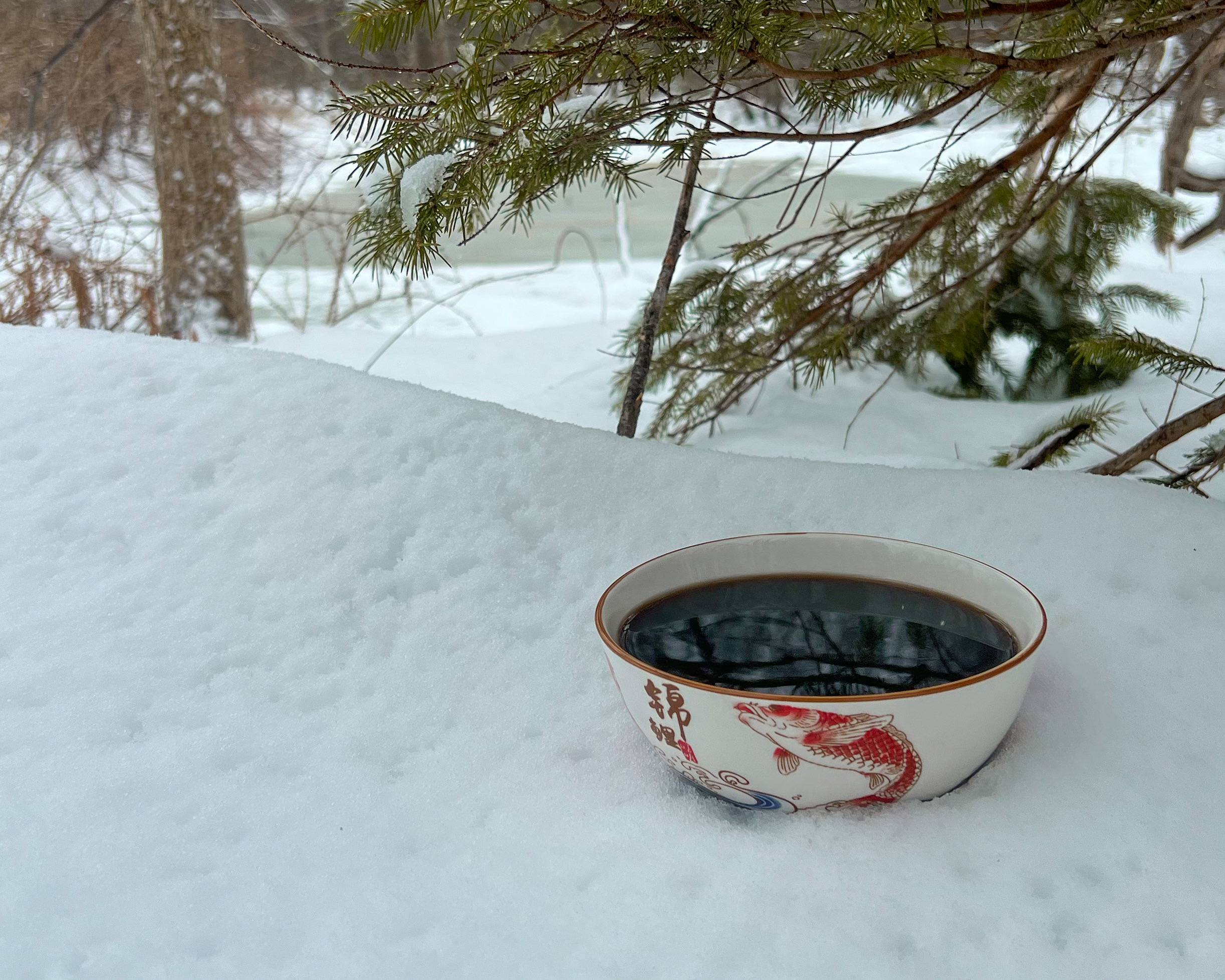
A traditional Chinese herbal decoction (湯劑/汤剂)

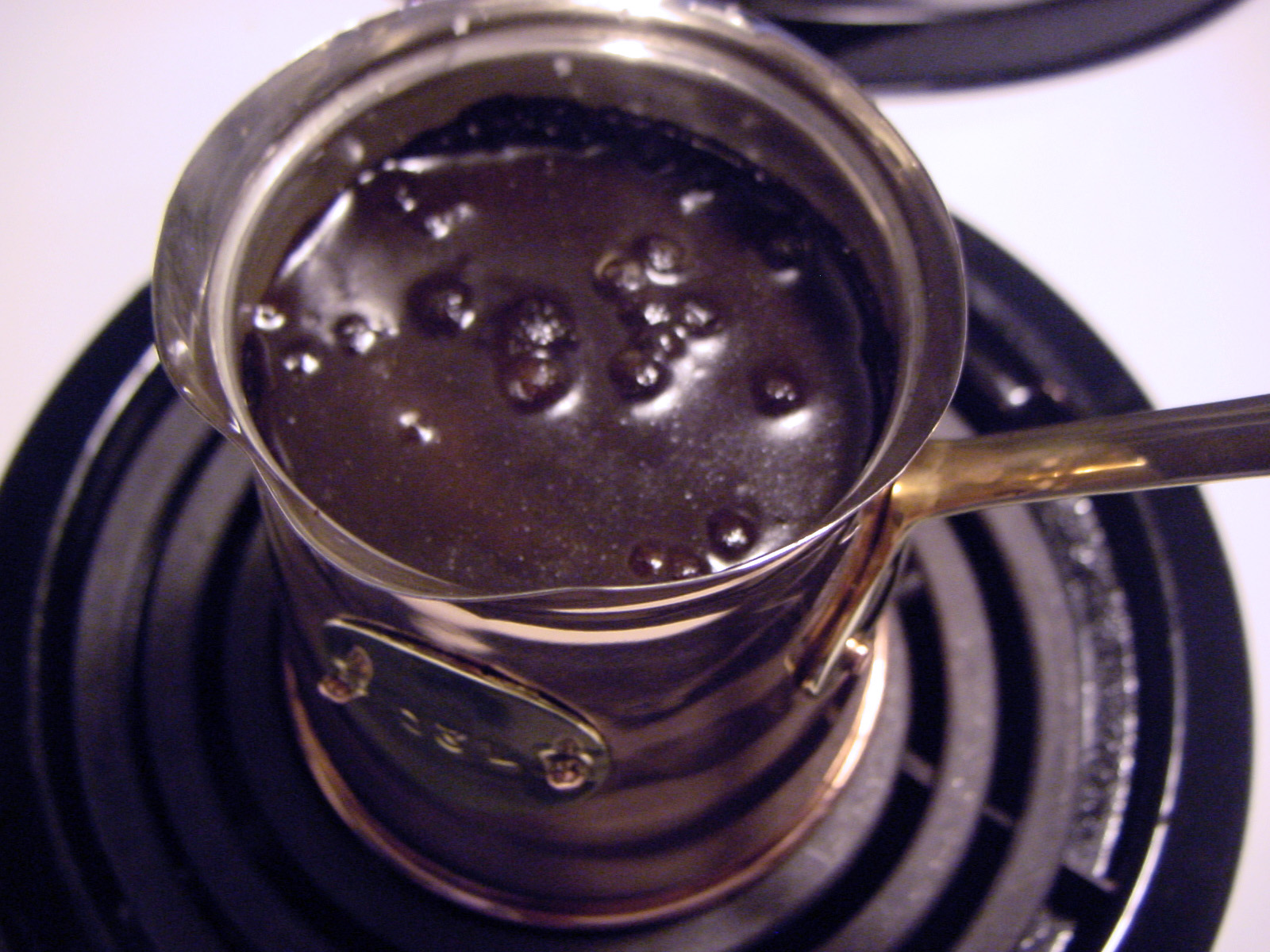
Turkish coffee beginning to boil. Decoction compares to brewing coffee through percolation.

Decoction is a method of extraction by boiling herbal or plant material (which may include stems, roots, bark and rhizomes) to dissolve the chemicals of the material. It is the most common preparation method in various herbal medicine systems. Decoction involves first drying the plant material; then mashing, slicing, or cutting the material to allow for maximum dissolution; and finally boiling in water to extract oils, volatile organic compounds and other various chemical substances. Occasionally, aqueous ethanol or glycerol may be used instead of water.

Decoction can be used to make tisanes, tinctures and similar solutions. Decoctions and infusions may produce liquids with differing chemical properties, as the temperature or preparation difference may result in more oil-soluble chemicals in decoctions versus infusions. The process can also be applied to meats and vegetables to prepare bouillon or stock, though the term is typically only used to describe boiled plant extracts, usually for medicinal or scientific purposes.

Decoction is also the name for the resulting liquid. Although this method of extraction differs from infusion and percolation, the resultant liquids can sometimes be similar in their effects, or general appearance and taste.

== Etymology ==
The term dates back to 1350–1400 from the past participle stem of Latin decoquere (meaning "to boil down"), from de ("from") + coquere ("to cook").

== Use ==
In brewing, decoction mashing is the traditional method where a portion of the mash is removed to a separate vessel, boiled for a time and then returned to the main mash, raising the mash to the next temperature step.

In herbalism, decoctions are usually made to extract fluids from hard plant materials such as roots and bark. To achieve this, the plant material is usually boiled for 1–2 hours in 1-5 liters of water. It is then strained. Ayurveda also uses this method to create Kashayam-type herbal medicines.

For teas, decoction involves boiling the same amount of the herb and water that would be used for an infusion (one teaspoon per cup) for about five to ten minutes.

== See also ==
- Maceration (cooking)
- Coffee boiling
