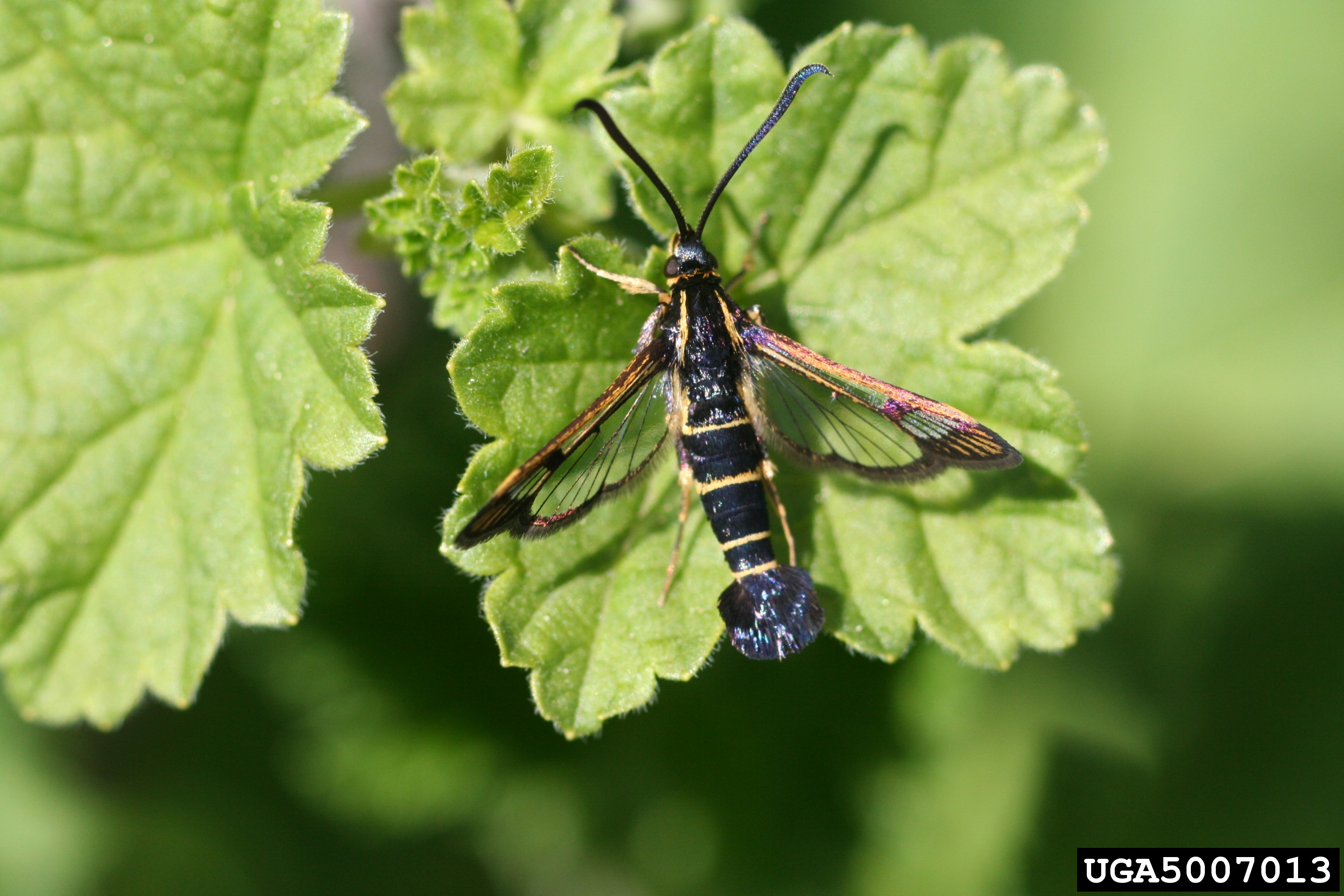

Scientific classification
- Kingdom: Animalia
- Phylum: Arthropoda
- Clade: Pancrustacea
- Class: Insecta
- Order: Lepidoptera
- Family: Sesiidae
- Genus: Synanthedon
- Species: S. tipuliformis

Binomial name
- Synanthedon tipuliformis (Clerck, 1759)

Synonyms
- Synanthedon salmachus Linnaeus, 1758; Sphinx ophioniformis Hübner, 1808; Sphinx salmachus Linnaeus, 1758; Sphinx tipula Retzius, 1783; Sphinx tipuliformis Clerck, 1759

= Synanthedon tipuliformis =

Species of moth

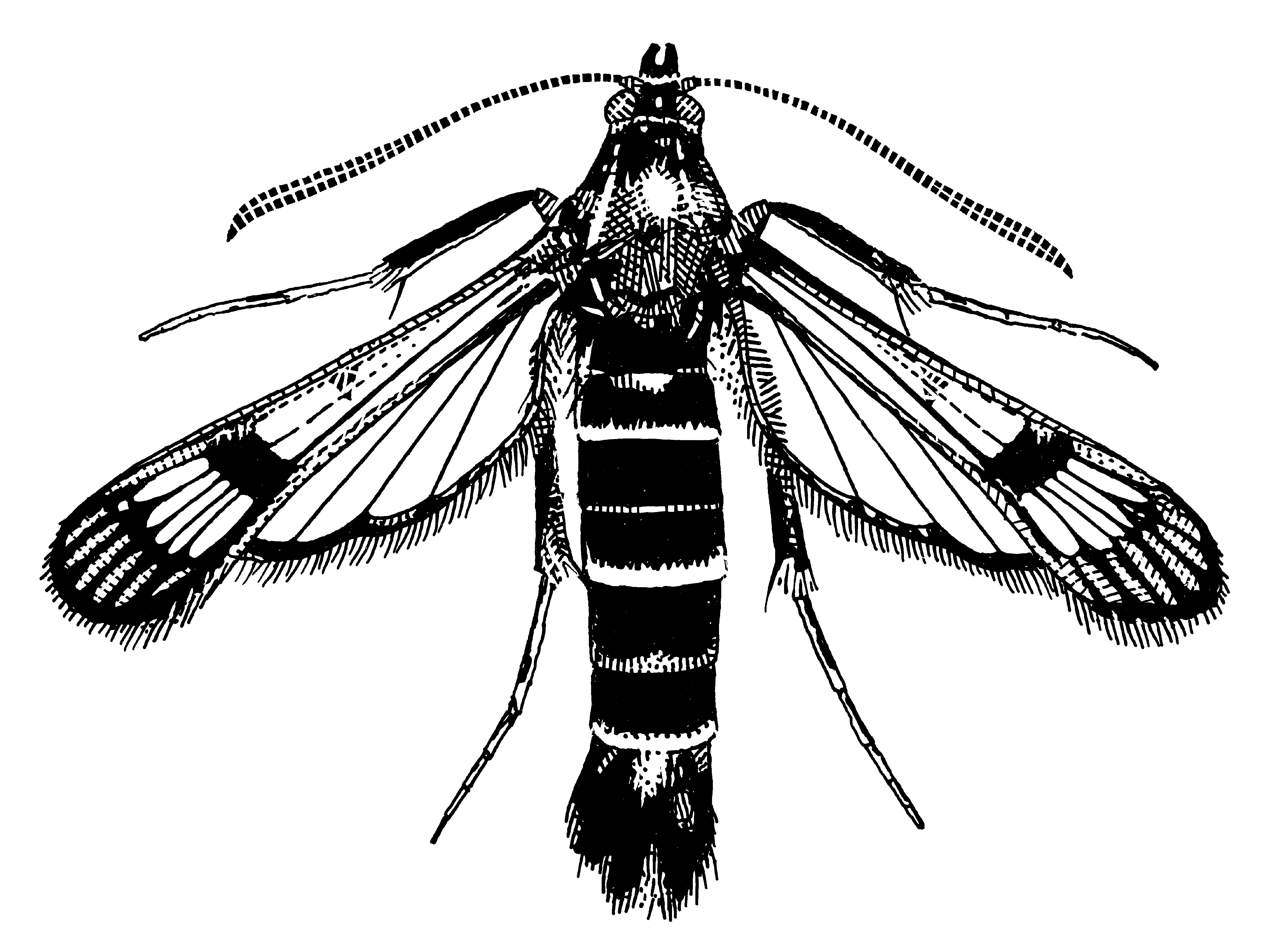
Synanthedon tipuliformis illustration by Des Helmore

Synanthedon tipuliformis, known as the currant clearwing, is a moth of the family Sesiidae. It is endemic to the Palearctic realm, but is an invasive species in the Nearctic realm and the Australasian realm.

== Description ==
The wingspan is 17–20 millimetres (0.67–0.79 in). The moths have transparent wings, which are scaled only on the wing veins, the discal spot and the wing edges. The scales shine in blue-black shades. At the apex of the forewings there are weakly formed reddish or yellowish longitudinal stripes. In the middle, an elongated black-brown discal spot can be seen, which extends from the front to the back edge. The hind wings have a narrow dark marginal band and a small black-brown discal spot. The antennae are black and yellow dusty on the underside. The black thorax has lateral yellow stripes. On segments two, four, six and seven of the black abdomen there are thin yellow rings in the males. Female moths show equally coloured rings on segments two, four and six. The tufts are strongly fan-shaped and of blue-black color.

== Similar species ==
There is a great similarity to the following species:

- Spuler's Clearwing (Synanthedon spuleri)
- Dale's oak clearwing (Synanthedon conopiformis)
- Fir Clearwing (Synanthedon cephiformis)
- Sallow Clearwing (Synanthedon flaviventris)
- Mistletoe Clearwing (Synanthedon loranthi)

A reliable determination of the species should be carried out by specialists, since the differences in external appearance are very small.

== Biology ==
The moth flies from April to July depending on the location.

The larvae feed on Ribes species, including Ribes nigrum, Ribes rubrum and Ribes uva-crispa. They bore into the stems to feed.

== Life cycle ==
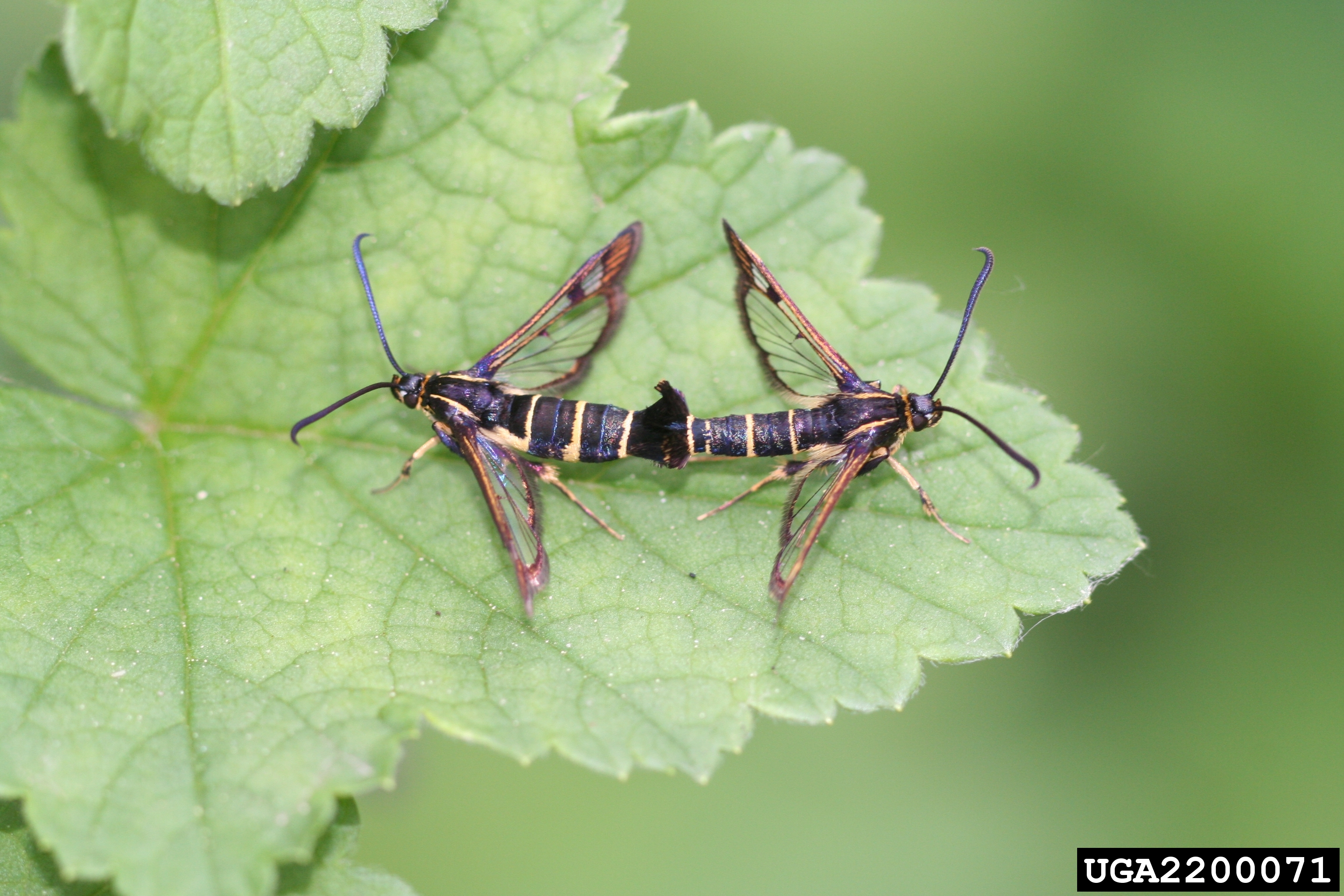
Mating

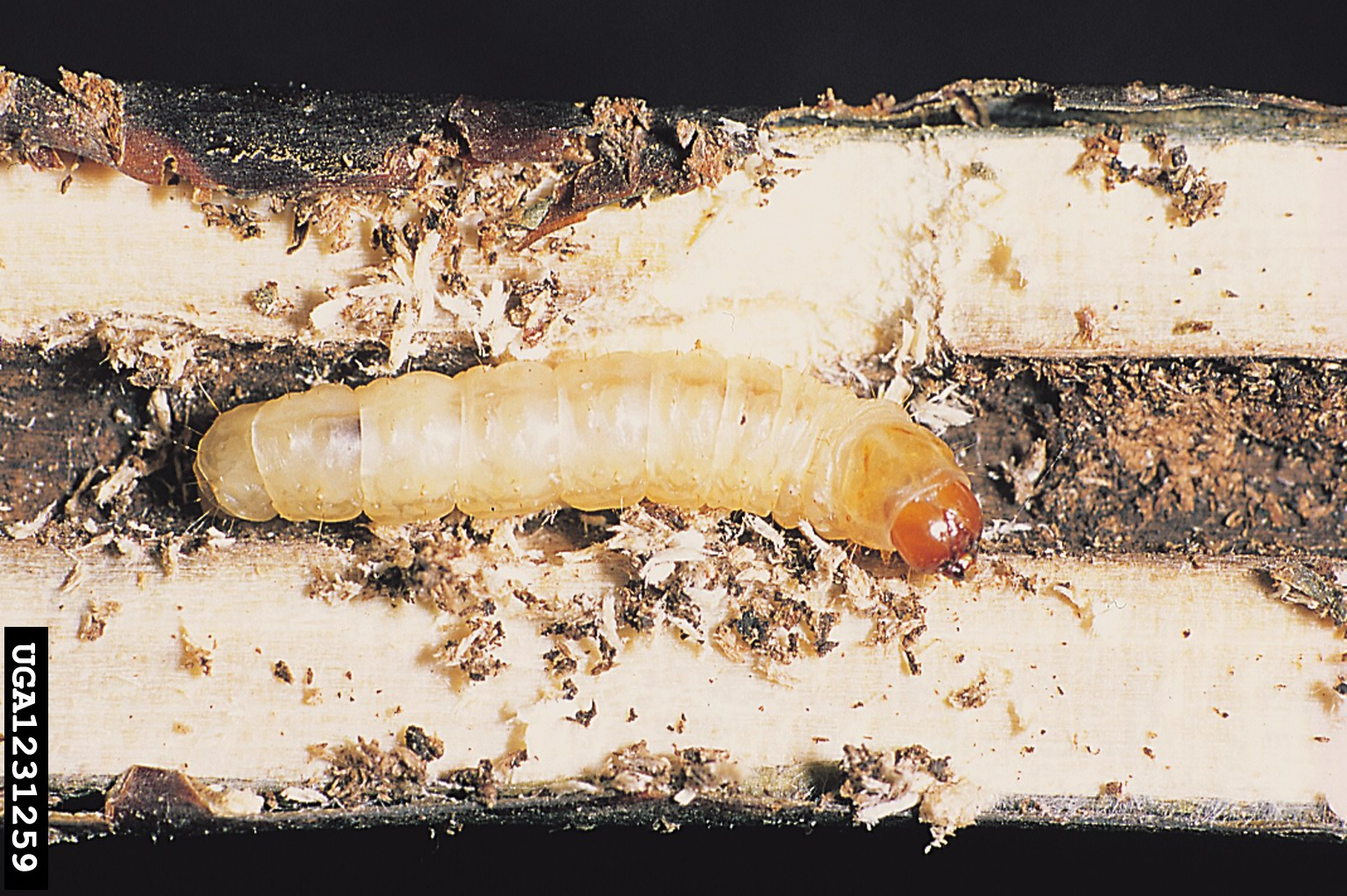
Caterpillar

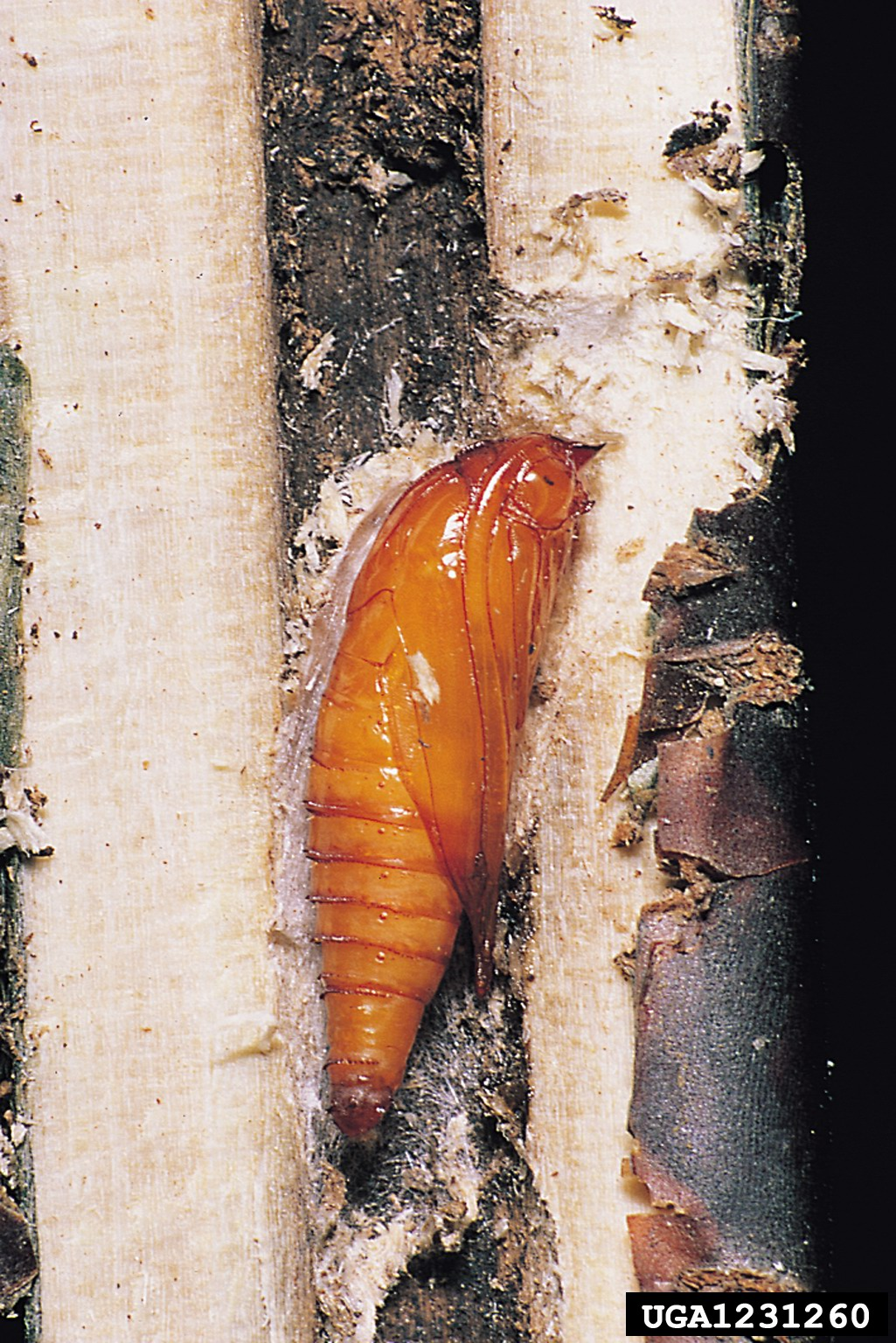
Pupa
