= Argyrotaenia loxonephes =

Scientific classification
- Kingdom: Animalia
- Phylum: Arthropoda
- Class: Insecta
- Order: Lepidoptera
- Family: Tortricidae
- Genus: Argyrotaenia
- Species: A. loxonephes

Binomial name
- Argyrotaenia loxonephes (Meyrick, 1937)

Synonyms
- Eulia loxonephes Meyrick, 1937

Species of moth

Argyrotaenia loxonephes is a species of moth of the family Tortricidae. It is found in Argentina.

The length of the forewings is about 7.3 mm for males and 5.9-6.1 mm for females.

The larvae have been recorded feeding on Solanaceae species. All recorded food plants are: Dahlia, Rosa, Lilium, Eucalyptus, Plantago, Rumex, Gladiolus and Pelargonium species, Linum usitatissimum, Humulus lupulus, Baccharis salicifolia, Gutierrezia mondonii, Zea mays, Mentha piperita, Glycine max, Medicago sativa, Asparagus officinalis, Cydonia oblonga, Malus sylvestris, Prunus domestica, Pyrus communis, Rubus species (including Rubus idaeus), Populus nigra, Ribes grossularia, Ribes nigrum, Ribes sativum, Apium graveolens and Vitis vinifera. However, a number of these might actually refer to other Argyrotaenia species.
