= Shrewsbury sauce =

English savoury sauce

Shrewsbury sauce is an English savoury pouring sauce, thought to have originated in the West Midlands town of Shrewsbury. The main ingredients to the sauce are red wine, redcurrants, tomato puree (giving the sauce its traditional, bright red appearance), rosemary, mustard (powder) and stock. Traditionally used as an accompaniment for lamb, the sauce has since found use in other dishes due to its popularity.

== See also ==
- List of sauces
