= White currant =

Cultivars of a species of flowering plant

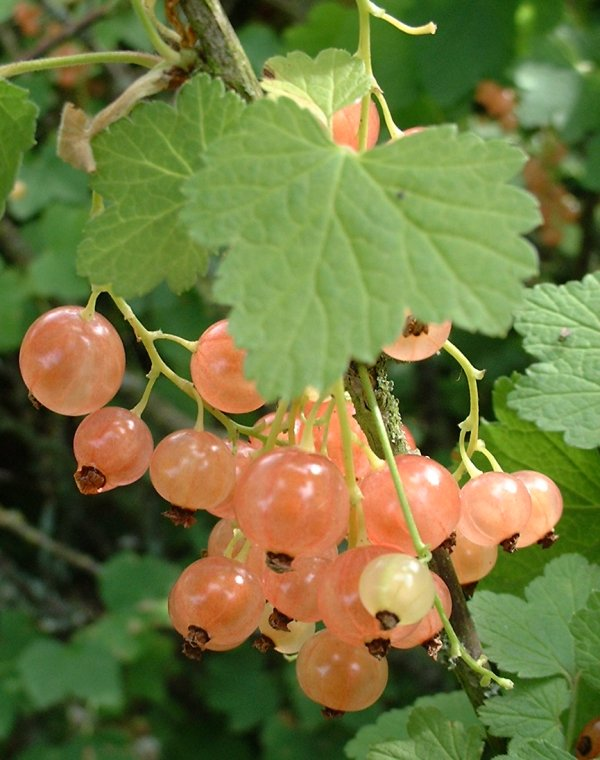
- Hybrid parentage: Ribes rubrum (red currant)
- Origin: Central and Eastern Europe

Currants, red and white, raw
Nutritional value per 100 g (3.5 oz)
- Energy: 234 kJ (56 kcal)
- Carbohydrates: 13.8 g
- Sugars: 7.37 g
- Dietary fiber: 4.3 g
- Fat: 0.2 g
- Protein: 1.4 g
Vitamins and minerals
Vitamins	Quantity %DV^{†}
Thiamine (B1)	3% 0.04 mg
Riboflavin (B2)	4% 0.05 mg
Niacin (B3)	1% 0.1 mg
Pantothenic acid (B5)	1% 0.064 mg
Vitamin B6	4% 0.07 mg
Folate (B9)	2% 8 μg
Choline	1% 7.6 mg
Vitamin C	46% 41 mg
Vitamin E	1% 0.1 mg
Vitamin K	9% 11 μg
Minerals	Quantity %DV^{†}
Calcium	3% 33 mg
Iron	6% 1 mg
Magnesium	3% 13 mg
Manganese	8% 0.186 mg
Phosphorus	4% 44 mg
Potassium	9% 275 mg
Sodium	0% 1 mg
Zinc	2% 0.23 mg
- Other constituents: Quantity
- Water: 84 g
- Link to USDA Database entry
- ^{†}Percentages estimated using US recommendations for adults, except for potassium, which is estimated based on expert recommendation from the National Academies.

The white currant or whitecurrant is a group of cultivars of the red currant (Ribes rubrum), a species of flowering plant in the family Grossulariaceae, native to Europe.

It is sometimes mislabelled as Ribes glandulosum, called the "skunk currant" in the United States.

== Description ==
It is a deciduous shrub growing to 1 m (3 ft) tall and broad, with palmate leaves, and masses of spherical, edible fruit (berries) in summer. The white currant differs from the red currant only in the colour and flavour of these fruits, which are a translucent white and sweeter.

== Cultivation ==
Unlike their close relative the blackcurrant, red and white currants are cultivated for their ornamental value as well as their berries.

Currant bushes grow best in partial to full sunlight and can be planted between November and March in well-drained, neutral to slightly acid soil. They are considered cool-climate plants and fruit better in northern areas. They can also be grown in large containers.

The firm and juicy fruit are usually harvested in summer. Whole trusses of fruits can be cut instead of individual fruit, and then either used, or they can be stored in a fridge. They can also be bagged and frozen.

Various forms are known including 'Blanka', 'White Pearl', and 'Versailles Blanche' (syn 'White Versailles'). 'Versailles Blanche' was first bred in France in 1843.

The cultivars 'White Grape' and 'Blanka' have gained the Royal Horticultural Society's Award of Garden Merit. There are also cultivars with yellow and pink fruit, called respectively 'yellow currants' and 'pink currants'.

The bushes can suffer from pests such as gooseberry sawfly and birds. The bushes are best grown in fruit cages for protection.

== Culinary uses ==
White currant berries are slightly smaller and sweeter than red currants. When made into jams and jellies the result is normally pink. The white currant is actually a less pigmented cultivar of the red currant but is marketed as a different fruit. White currants are rarely specified in savoury cooking recipes compared with their red counterparts. They are often served raw and provide a sweetly tart flavor. White currant preserves, jellies, wines and syrups are also produced. In particular, white currants are the classic ingredient in the highly regarded Bar-le-duc or Lorraine jelly although preparations made of red currants can also be found.

== Nutrition ==
White currant berries are 84% water, 14% carbohydrates, 1% protein, and contain negligible fat (table). In a 100 gram (3.5 oz) reference amount, white currant berries supply 56 calories, and are a rich source (46% of the Daily Value, DV) of vitamin C, with no other micronutrients in appreciable amounts (table).

== See also ==
- Zante currant
- Gooseberry
- Jostaberry
- Ribes
