= Bar-le-duc jelly =

Currant jelly preparation

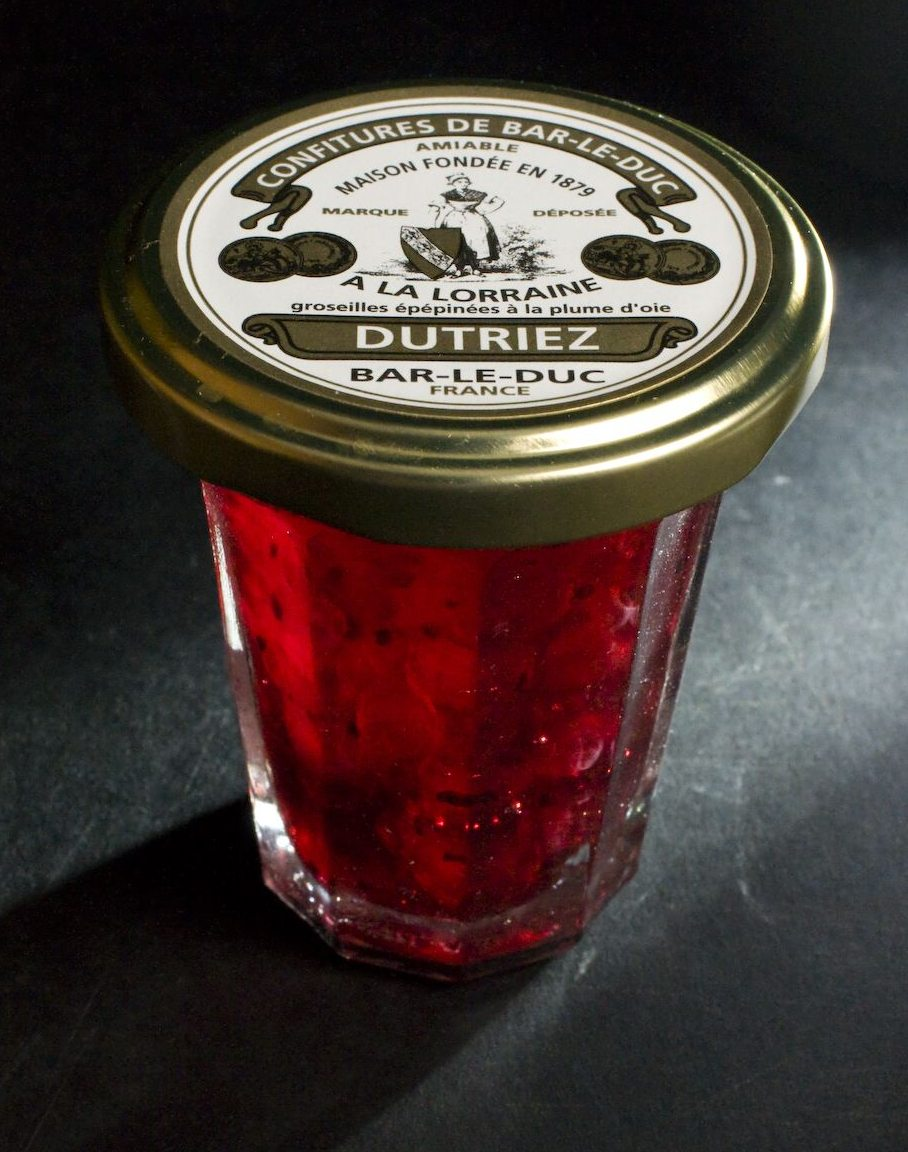
- A jar of red currant jam
- Type: Spread
- Place of origin: France
- Region or state: Bar-le-duc
- Main ingredients: Currants (white currants or less commonly, red currants)
- Other information: also prepared in some former French colonies, notably New France (now Canada and the United States)

Bar-le-duc jelly (French pronunciation: [baʁ lə dyk]) is a highly regarded preparation of jelly originally composed of select whole seeded currants, typically white currants or red currants. The name Bar-le-duc refers to the geographical origin of the preparation in the French town of Bar-le-duc. Since the jelly's first documented reference in 1344, the culinary name "Lorraine jelly" is occasionally used, as the city of Bar-le-duc lies within the boundaries of the former province of Lorraine.

Commonly served as an accompaniment to game, spread on bread, or with foie gras, it is considered a culinary luxury, purportedly sharing an elite status akin to Beluga caviar and is colloquially referred to as Bar caviar. The typical product is a jam, with the berries remaining intact in a thin syrup. About 200 currants go into one 85 gram jar (approximately 3 ounces), which costs approximately €18 a jar in Bar-le-Duc (as of 2021) and $40 in the US (as of 2008). The spread has been enjoyed by notables such as Alfred Hitchcock, Ernest Hemingway, Victor Hugo, and Mary, Queen of Scots.

== Examples ==
As of 2012, the House of Dutriez in the town of Bar-le-Duc provides one of the very few hand-made preparations still on the market, la confiture de Groseilles de Bar le Duc (Currant Preserve). The traditionally hand-made product involves épépineurs or épépineuses (seed extractors) de-seeding the currants with goose quills to flick out the tiny seeds without disturbing the flesh of the small fruit. Sometimes sweetened jellies, consisting of mashed and sieved currants of a significantly lower cost and quality, appear on the market under the same name.

== See also ==
- List of spreads
