= The Blackcurrant Pie =

Painting by Willem Claesz. Heda

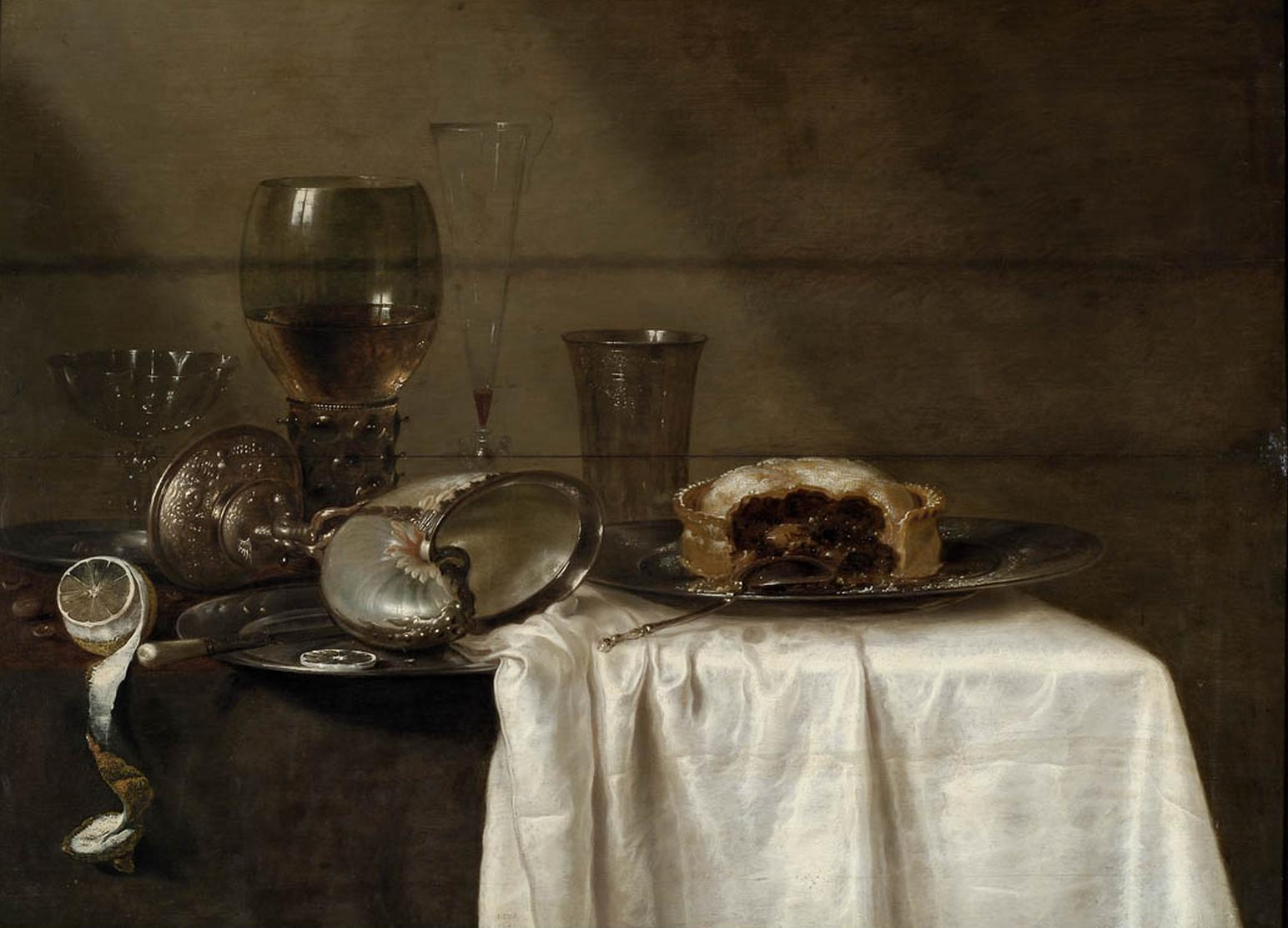
- Artist: Willem Claesz. Heda
- Year: 1641
- Medium: oil painting on panel
- Movement: Dutch Golden Age painting Still life painting
- Subject: A blackcurrant pie on a table covered by a white tablecloth, with a rummer, a nautilus shell, a lemon, and further drinking vessels
- Dimensions: 57.5 cm × 79 cm (22.6 in × 31 in)
- Location: Musée des Beaux-Arts, Strasbourg
- Accession: 1948

The Blackcurrant Pie is a 1641 still life painting by the Dutch artist Willem Claesz. Heda. It is now in the Musée des Beaux-Arts of Strasbourg, France. Its inventory number is 1745.

The painting is representative of the mature Heda's style. The setting and the objects reappear with variants in several of Heda's paintings of that period (see below). The Blackcurrant Pie does not simply depict a still life with a great emphasis on texture and reflections, but also expresses the transience of all things (the lemon is peeled and cut in half, the rummer is half empty, the pie is partly eaten); it serves as an allegory.

== Other versions ==
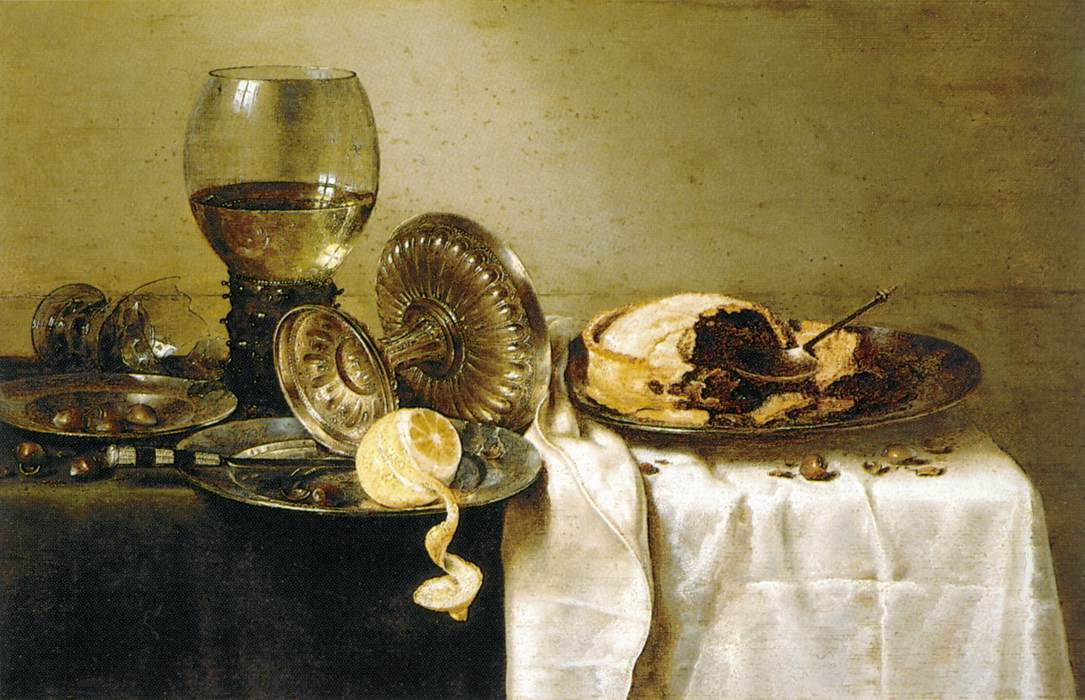
Thyssen-Bornemisza Museum

Suermondt-Ludwig-Museum

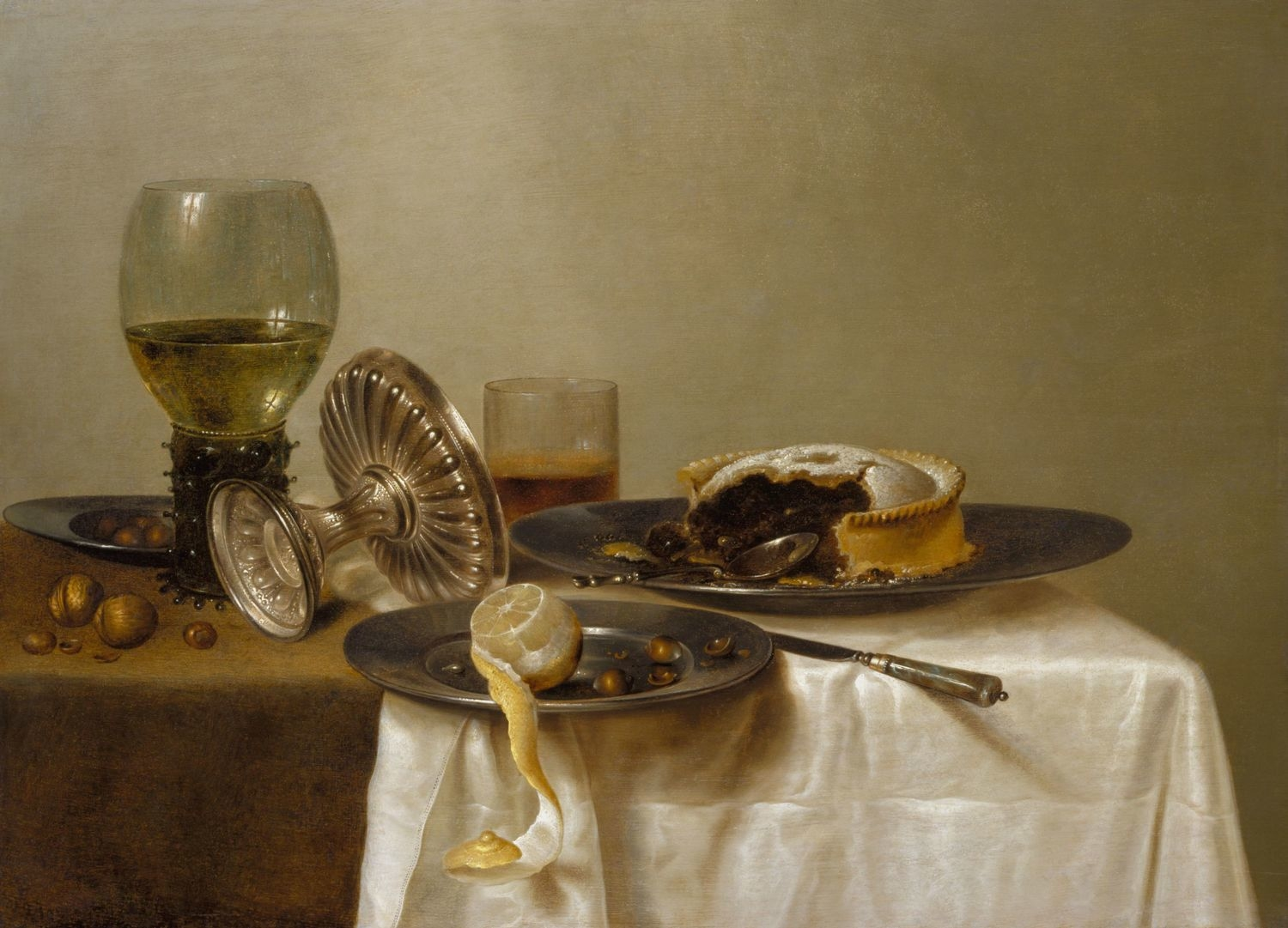
Royal Collection
