= Tulipanin =

Names
- IUPAC name 3′,4′,5,5′,7-Pentahydroxy-3-[α-L-rhamnopyranosyl-(1→6)-β-D-glucopyranosyloxy]flavylium
- Systematic IUPAC name (4^{2}S,4^{3}R,4^{4}S,4^{5}S,4^{6}R,7^{2}R,7^{3}R,7^{4}R,7^{5}R,7^{6}S)-1^{3},1^{4},1^{5},2^{5},2^{7},4^{3},4^{4},4^{5},7^{3},7^{4},7^{5}-Undecahydroxy-7^{6}-methyl-2^{1}λ^{4}-3,6-dioxa-2(2,3)-[1]benzopyrana-4(2,6),7(2)-bis(oxana)-1(1)-benzenaheptaphan-2^{1}-ylium
- Other names Delphinidin-3-rutinoside; Delphinidin 3-O-rutinoside; Delphinidin-3-glucorhamnoside

Identifiers
CAS Number	58285-26-0
3D model (JSmol)	Interactive image
ChemSpider	4590910
KEGG	C16315
PubChem CID	5492231
UNII	6I4SV29842
- InChI: InChI=1S/C27H30O16/c1-8-18(32)21(35)23(37)26(40-8)39-7-17-20(34)22(36)24(38)27(43-17)42-16-6-11-12(29)4-10(28)5-15(11)41-25(16)9-2-13(30)19(33)14(31)3-9/h2-6,8,17-18,20-24,26-27,32,34-38H,7H2,1H3,(H4-,28,29,30,31,33)/p+1/t8-,17+,18-,20+,21+,22-,23+,24+,26+,27+/m0/s1 Key: PLKUTZNSKRWCCA-LTSKFBHWSA-O
- SMILES: O(C[C@H]4O[C@@H](Oc2cc3c(O)cc(O)cc3[o+]c2c1cc(O)c(O)c(O)c1)[C@H](O)[C@@H](O)[C@@H]4O)[C@@H]5O[C@H]([C@H](O)[C@@H](O)[C@H]5O)C

Properties
Chemical formula	C_{27}H_{31}ClO_{16} C_{27}H_{31}O_{16}^{+}
Molar mass	611.52 g/mol
- Except where otherwise noted, data are given for materials in their standard state (at 25 °C [77 °F], 100 kPa). verify (what is ?) Infobox references

Tulipanin is an anthocyanin. It is the 3-O-rutinoside of delphinidin. It can be found in Alstroemeria spp., Berberis spp., Cissus sicyoides, Hymenocallis spp., Manihot utilissima, Meliosma tenuis, Musa acuminata, Ophiopogon japonicus, Petunia exserta, Petunia reitzii, blackcurrant (Ribes nigrum), Schismatoglottis concinna, Secale cereale, Solanum betaceum, Thaumatococcus daniellii, Tulipa spp and in eggplants.
