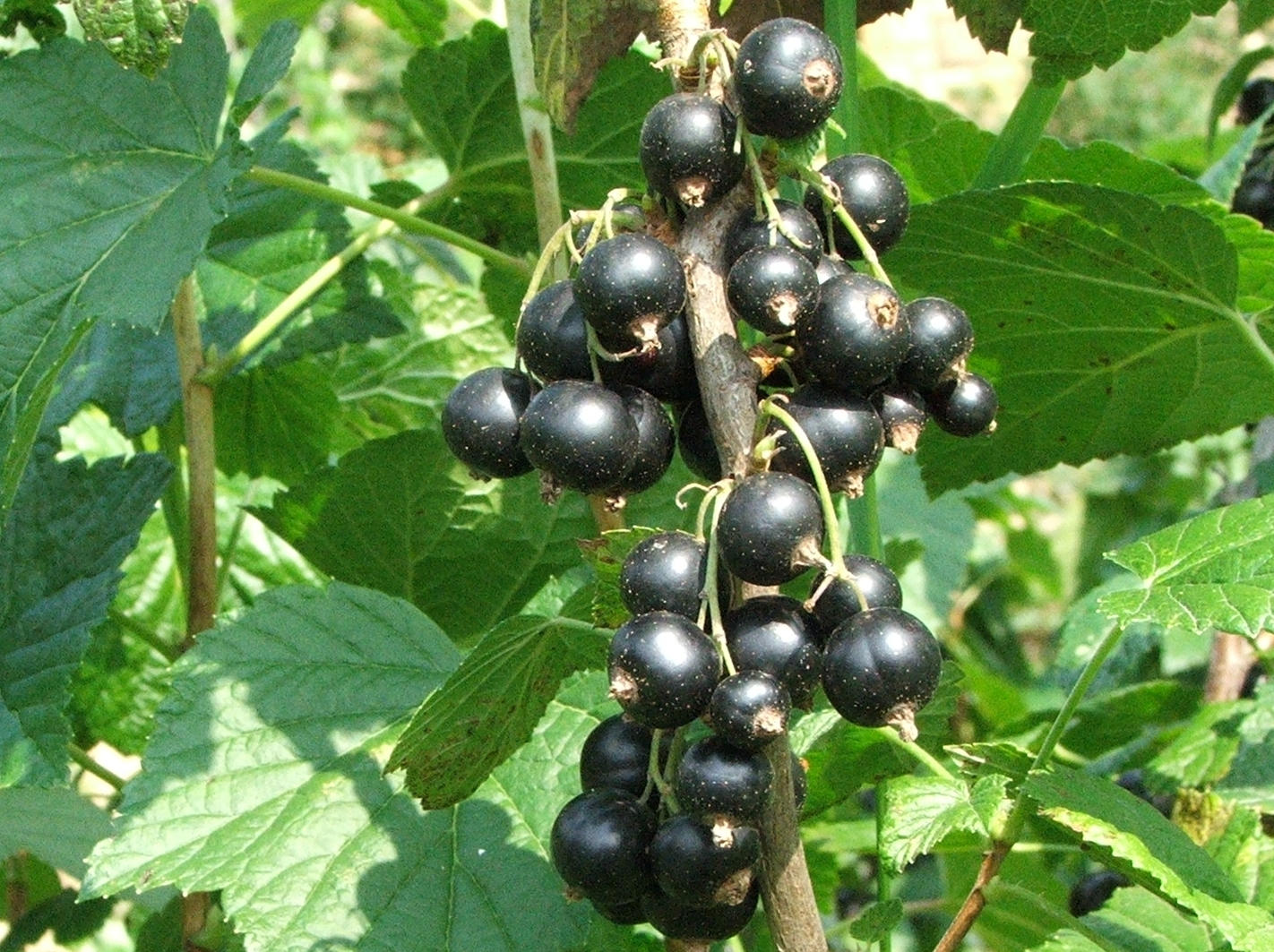
- Berries

Scientific classification
- Kingdom: Plantae
- Clade: Tracheophytes
- Clade: Angiosperms
- Clade: Eudicots
- Order: Saxifragales
- Family: Grossulariaceae
- Genus: Ribes
- Species: R. nigrum

Binomial name
- Ribes nigrum L.

Synonyms
- List: Botrycarpum nigrum (L.) A. Rich.; Botrycarpum obtusilobum Opiz nom. nud.; Grossularia nigra (L.) Rupr.; Ribes aconitifolium K.Koch; Ribes apiifolium K.Koch; Ribes bactonii Lavallée; Ribes cyathiforme Pojark.; Ribes intermedium Bercht. & J.Presl; Ribes kolymense (Trautv.) Kom.; Ribes nigrum f. apiifolium (G.Kirchn.) Rehder; Ribes nigrum var. apiifolium G.Kirchn.; Ribes nigrum f. chlorocarpum (Späth) Rehder; Ribes nigrum var. chlorocarpum Späth; Ribes nigrum var. eglandulosum Malyschev; Ribes nigrum var. europaeum Jancz.; Ribes nigrum f. heterophyllum (Pépin) Rehder; Ribes nigrum var. heterophyllum Pépin; Ribes nigrum f. incisum H.Lindb. ex Hiitonen; Ribes nigrum f. marmoratum (Mouill.) Rehder; Ribes nigrum var. marmoratum Mouill.; Ribes nigrum var. pauciflorum (Turcz. ex Ledeb.) Jancz.; Ribes nigrum var. polyandrum Gray; Ribes nigrum var. praecox W.Wolf; Ribes nigrum f. subalpinum Krasnob.; Ribes nigrum f. xanthocarpum (Späth) Rehder; Ribes nigrum var. xanthocarpum Späth; Ribes olidum Moench; Ribes pauciflorum Turcz. ex Ledeb.; Ribesium nigrum (L.) Medik.

= Blackcurrant =

Species of flowering plant in the gooseberry family

The blackcurrant (Ribes nigrum), black currant or cassis (Note: Same in many Romance languages: Spanish, Portuguese, French) is a deciduous shrub in the family Grossulariaceae grown for its edible berries. It is native to temperate parts of central and northern Europe and northern Asia, where it prefers damp fertile soils. It is widely cultivated both commercially and domestically.

It is winter hardy, but cold weather at flowering time during the spring may reduce the size of the crop. Bunches of small, glossy black fruit develop along the stems in the summer and can be harvested by hand or by machine.

The raw fruit is particularly rich in vitamin C and polyphenols. Blackcurrants can be eaten raw but are usually cooked in various dishes. They are used to make jams, preserves, and syrups and are grown commercially for the juice market. The fruit is also used to make alcoholic beverages and dyes.

== Description ==
Ribes nigrum is a medium-sized shrub, growing to 1.5 by 1.5 metres (5 by 5 feet). The leaves are alternate, simple, 3 to 5 centimetres (1 1/4 to 2 inches) broad and long with five palmate lobes and a serrated margin. All parts of the plant are strongly aromatic. The flowers are produced in racemes known as "strigs" up to 8 cm (3 in) long containing 10–20 flowers, each about 8 millimetres (3/8 in) in diameter. Each flower has a hairy calyx with yellow glands, the five lobes of which are longer than the inconspicuous petals. There are five stamens surrounding the stigma and style and two fused carpels. The flowers open in succession from the base of the string and are mostly insect pollinated, but some pollen is distributed by the wind. They are somewhat self-pollinating, but produce more fruit when pollinated by another plant of a different variety. A pollen grain landing on a stigma will germinate and send a slender pollen tube down the style to the ovule. In warm weather, this takes about 48 hours, but in cold weather, it may take a week, and by that time, the ovule may have passed the stage where it is receptive. If fewer than about 35 ovules are fertilised, the fruit may not be able to develop and will fall prematurely. Frost can damage both unopened and open flowers when the temperature falls below −1.9 °C (28.6 °F). The flowers at the base of the strig are more protected by the foliage and are less likely to be damaged.

In midsummer the strigs of green fruit ripen to edible berries, very dark purple in colour, almost black, with glossy skins and calyxes at the apex (the calyxes being persistent), each containing many seeds. An established bush can produce about 4.5 kilograms (10 pounds) of fruit each year.

Plants from Northern Asia are sometimes distinguished as a separate variety, Ribes nigrum var. sibiricum, of which R. cyathiforme is considered a synonym.

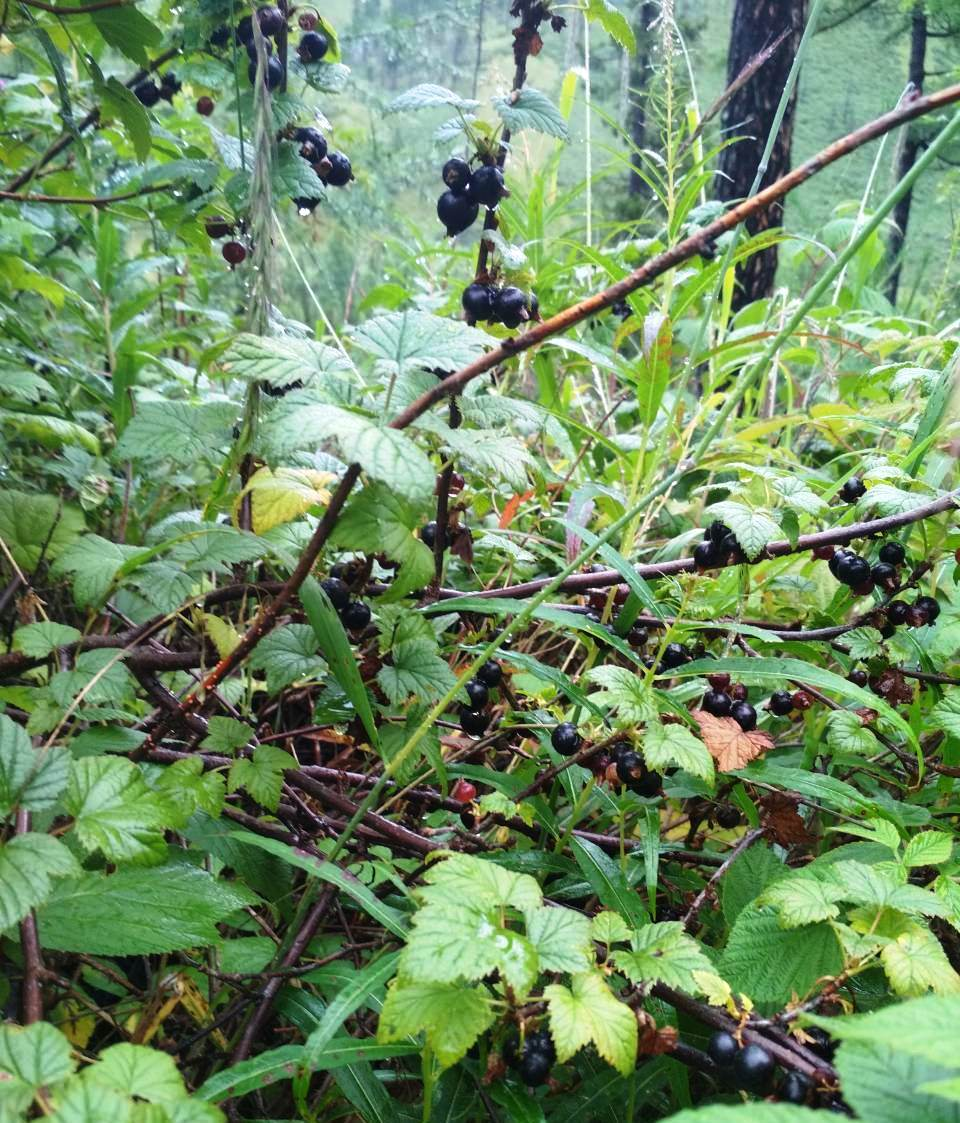
In mountains of Buryatia, Russia

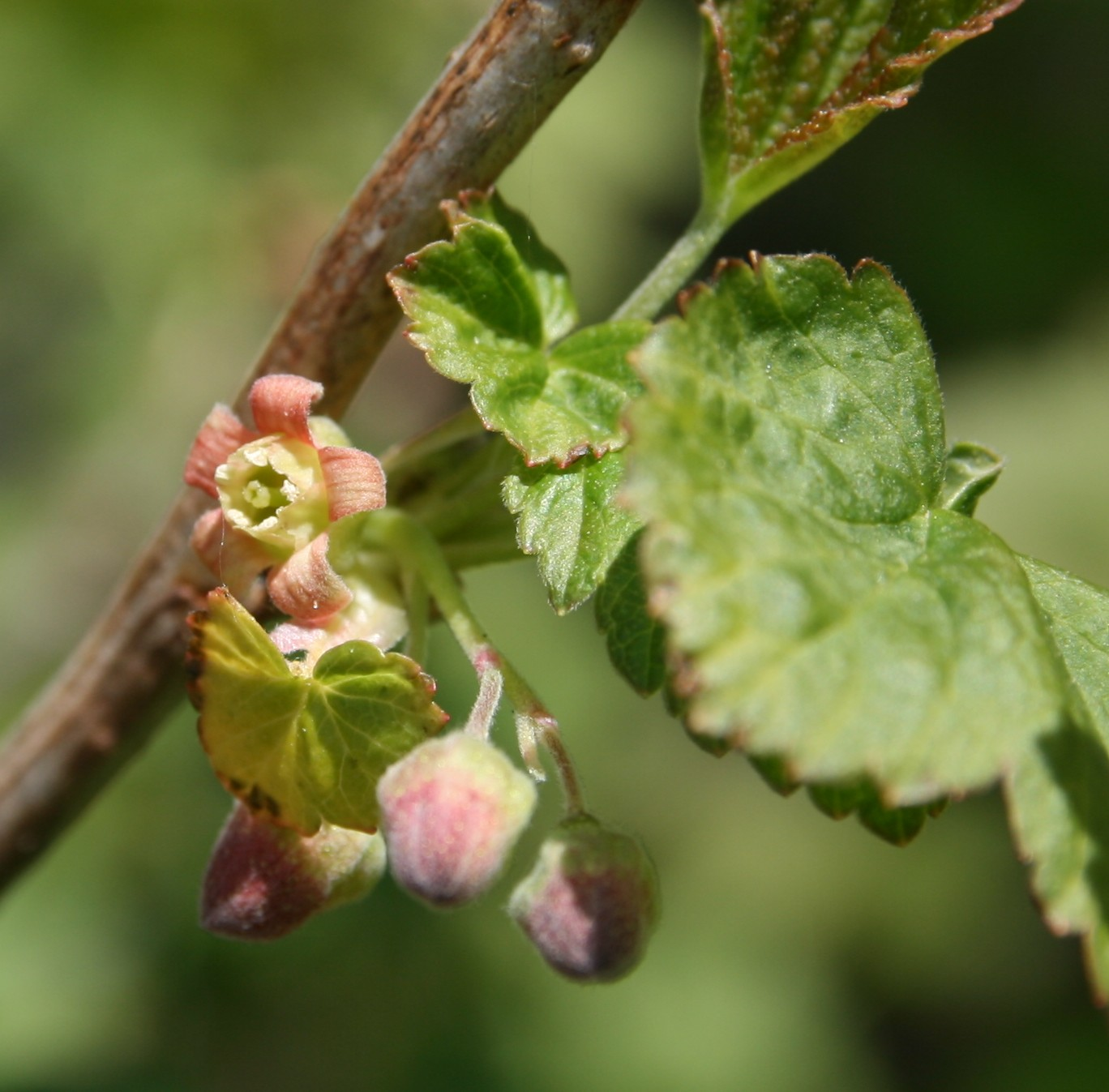
Flowers

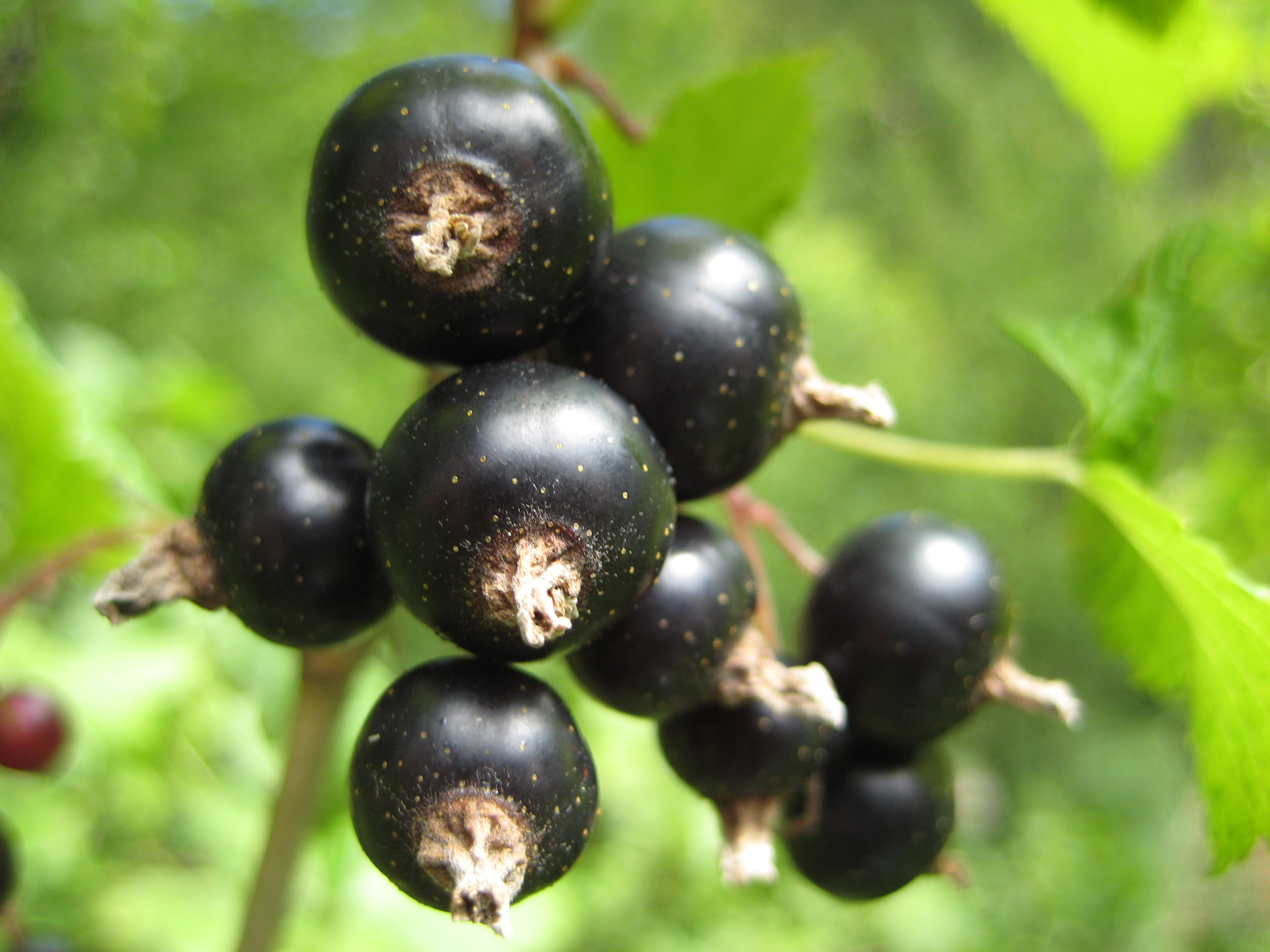
Close-up of berries

=== Phytochemicals ===
Polyphenol phytochemicals present in the fruit, seeds, and leaves are being investigated for their potential biological activities. Major anthocyanins in blackcurrant pomace – delphinidin-3-O-glucoside, delphinidin-3-O-rutinoside, cyanidin-3-O-glucoside, and cyanidin-3-O-rutinoside, which are retained in the juice concentrate – are among other polyphenols.

== Distribution and habitat ==
The blackcurrant is native to northern Europe and Asia.

== Cultivation ==
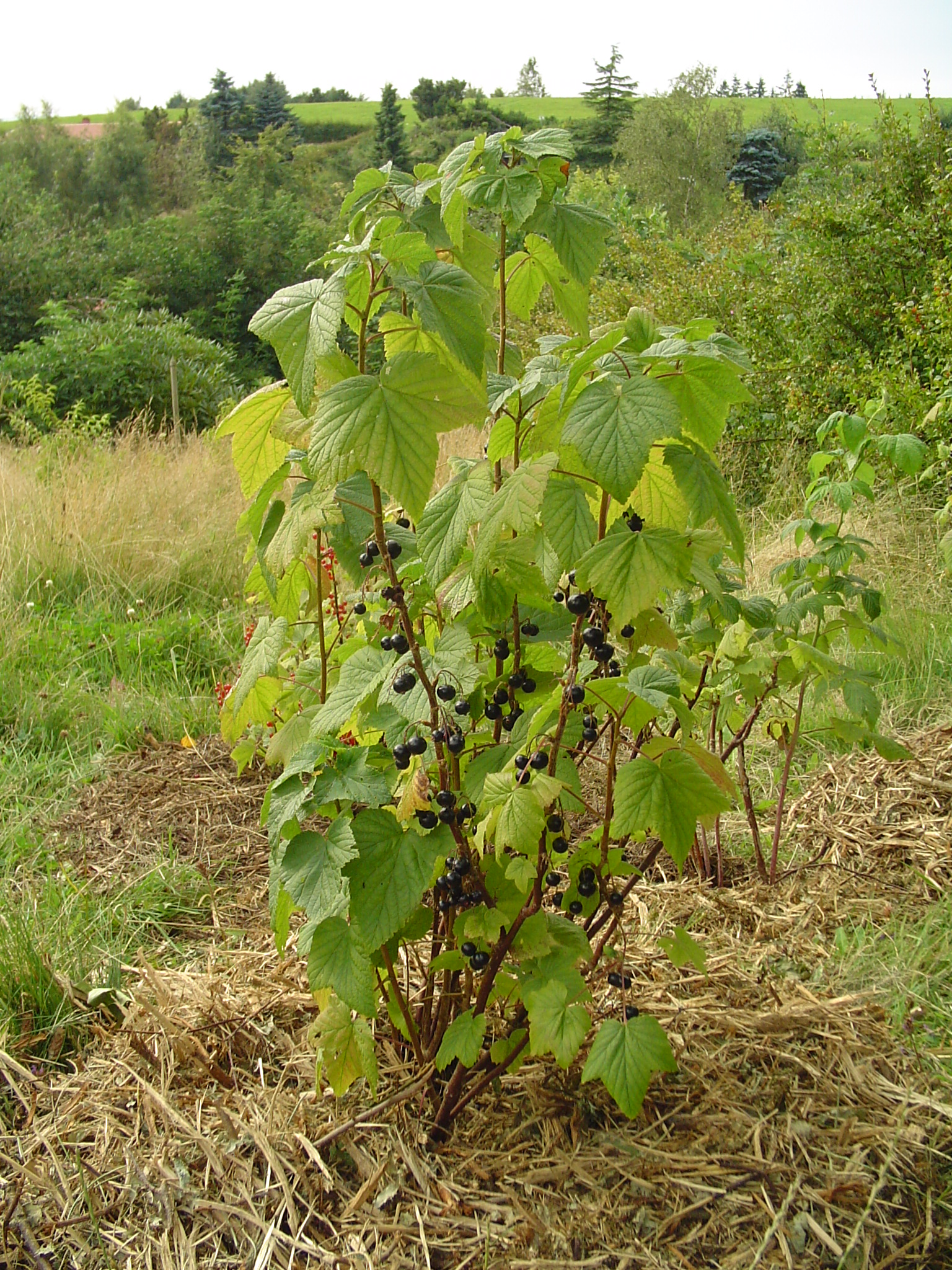
Cultivated specimen

Cultivation in Europe is thought to have started around the last decades of the 17th century.

=== Site selection and planting ===
Blackcurrants can grow well on sandy or heavy loams, or forest soils, as long as their nutrient requirements are met. They prefer damp, fertile but not waterlogged ground and are intolerant of drought. Although the bushes are winter hardy, frosts during the flowering period may adversely affect the yield and cold winds may restrict the number of flying insects visiting and pollinating the flowers. A soil pH of about 6 is ideal for blackcurrants and the ground can be limed if the soil is too acidic. Planting is usually done in the autumn or winter to allow the plants to become established before growth starts in the spring, but container-grown stock can be planted at any time of year.

Two-year-old bushes are usually planted but strong one-year-old stock can also be used. Planting certified stock avoids the risk of introducing viruses. On a garden scale the plants can be set at intervals of 1.5 to 1.8 m (5 to 6 ft) or they can be set in rows with planting intervals of 1.2 m (4 ft) and row separations of 2.5 m (8 ft) or more. In the UK, young bushes are generally planted deeper than their initial growing level to encourage new stems to grow from the base.

=== Manures and fertilizers ===
The blackcurrant requires a number of essential nutrients to thrive; nitrogen provides strong plant growth and stimulates the production of flower sprigs; phosphorus aids growth, the setting of fruit and crop yield; potassium promotes growth of individual shoots and increases the weight of individual fruits; magnesium is a constituent of chlorophyll and helps increase yields through interaction with potassium; calcium is required for cell division and enlargement and is particularly important for young plants and buds.

An annual spring mulch of well rotted manure is ideal and poultry manure can also be used but needs prior composting with straw or other waste vegetable material. Spent mushroom compost can be used but care should be taken as it often contains lime and blackcurrants prefer slightly acidic soils. The blackcurrant is a gross feeder and benefits from additional nitrogen, and phosphatic and potash fertilisers should also be applied annually. A balanced artificial fertilizer can be used and a 10-10-10 granular product can be spread around the bushes at the rate of 100 to 240 grams (3 1/2 to 8 1/2 ounces) per plant. Weed growth can be suppressed with an organic mulch such as sawdust, bark, mushroom compost or straw, heavy plastic topped with an organic mulch cover or landscape fabric.

=== Pruning ===
Blackcurrant fruit is borne primarily on one-year-old shoots. Newly planted bushes should be pruned severely, cutting all shoots back to two buds above ground level. This gives the plant a chance to get properly established before needing to put its energy into producing fruit. The general rule when pruning is to remove all weak shoots and those growing out sideways which may get weighed down when fruiting. The remaining branches should be thinned to remove old unproductive wood and to encourage new shoots. An established bush should not be allowed to become overcrowded and should have about one third of its main branches or stems removed each year. When harvesting by machine, plants with an upright growth habit are encouraged.

=== Harvesting ===
On a garden scale, the berries should be picked when dry and ripe. Commercially, most harvesting is done mechanically by straddle harvesters. These move continually down the rows, straddling a row of bushes, shaking the branches and stripping off the fruit. The blackcurrants are placed into half tonne bins and to minimise stoppage time, some machines have cross conveyors which direct the fruit into continuously moving trailers in the adjoining row. A modern machine can pick up to fifty tonnes of blackcurrants in a day using only one operator and two tractor drivers. The bins should be stored in a cool place. Some fruit is still picked by hand for use in the fresh fruit market.

=== Diseases and pests ===
Ribes plants are susceptible to several diseases and a number of insect pests. However, new varieties have been or are being developed to overcome some of these problems.

Reversion is a serious disease transmitted by the blackcurrant gall mite (Cecidophyopsis ribis). It causes a decline in yield and is quite widespread in Europe but is rarely encountered on other continents. Symptoms include a modification of leaf shape in summer and swollen buds ("big bud") in winter, each housing thousands of microscopic mites. As pest control has limited effectiveness, severely infected bushes should be destroyed. All new plants purchased should be certified as virus-free.

White pine blister rust (Cronartium ribicola) needs two alternate hosts to complete its life cycle. One host is plants in the genus Ribes. On the blackcurrant, it causes the leaves to become pale and later develop tiny orange pustules and sometimes a yellow filamentous coating on some leaves. The fruit crop is little affected but the leaves fall early and growth is slowed the following year. The other host is any of the white pines, in which it causes serious disease and mortality for the North American species that have not co-evolved with the rust. As a result, the blackcurrant was banned in the United States as a disease vector for much of the 20th century, and even after the federal ban was lifted in 1966, several U.S. states continued their own bans, some of which remain in force as of November 2020.

American gooseberry mildew and powdery mildew can infect the leaves and shoot tips, and botrytis may cause the fruit to rot in a wet season. Currant and gooseberry leaf spot (Drepanopeziza ribis) is another disease of blackcurrants, but it is not usually a serious problem as most cultivars now have some resistance.

The blackcurrant leaf midge can cause browning, crimping and distortion of leaves at the tips of shoots but it is seldom a serious problem. The blackcurrant sawfly (Nematus ribesii) lays its eggs on the underside of the leaves and the voracious larvae work their way along the shoots, stripping off leaf after leaf. In a serious attack, the bush can be denuded of leaves. Larvae of the currant borer drill their way along the centres of shoots, which wilt and die back. Other insect pests include scale insects, aphids and earwigs.

=== Research and cultivars ===
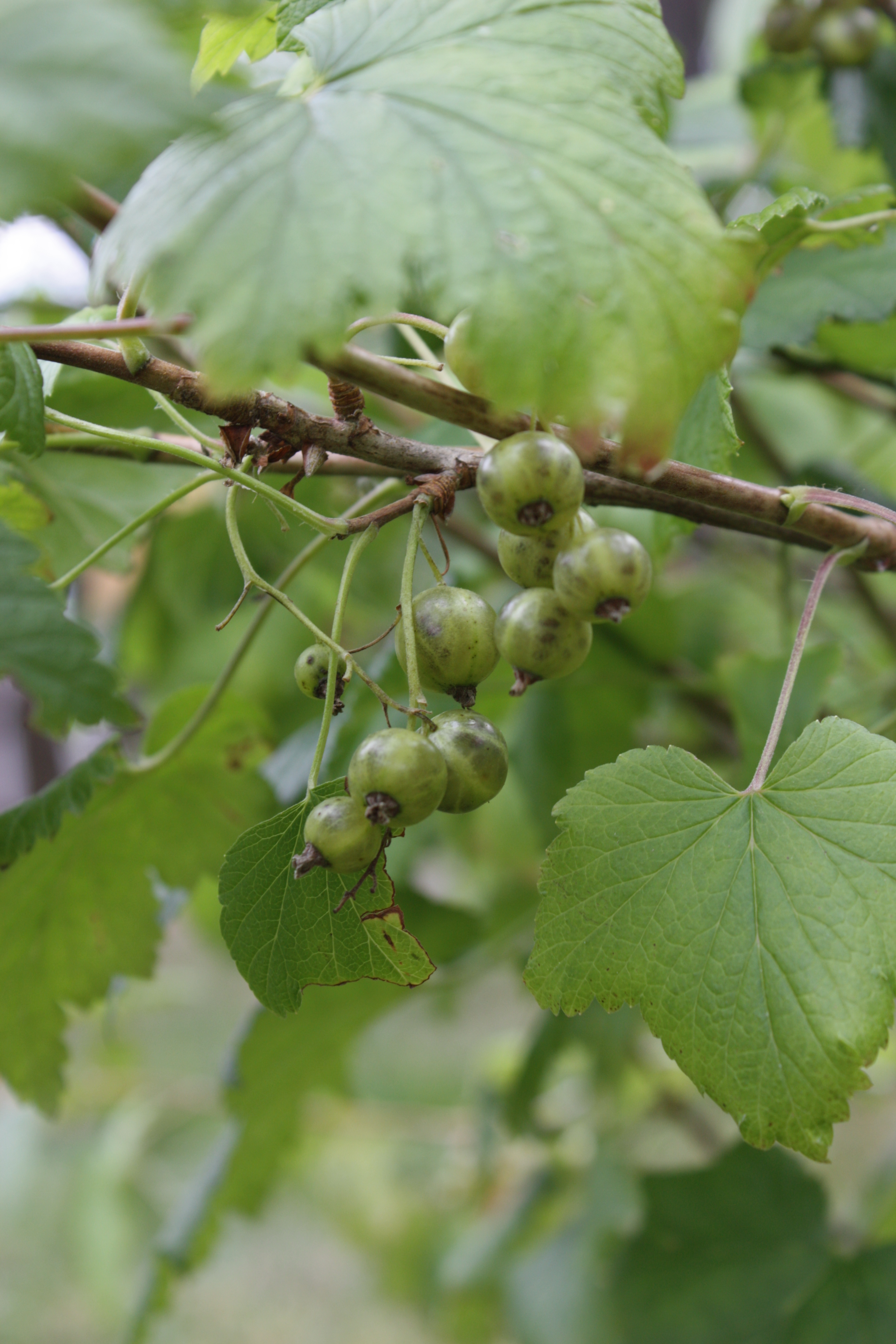
Green currant is a variant of blackcurrant cultivated in Finland; its berries lack the dark color and strong aroma typical of blackcurrant. This particular cultivar is 'Vertti'.

There are many cultivars of blackcurrant. 'Baldwin' was the mainstay of the industry for many years but it has now largely been superseded by more productive and disease-resistant varieties. During the 20th century in Europe, much hybridisation work has been carried out in order to reduce the plant's susceptibility to disease and frost and also to increase yields. This effort centered mainly in Scotland, Poland, and New Zealand.

In Britain the Scottish Crop Research Institute was tasked with developing new varieties suitable for growing in the north of the country. They produced new cultivars that had greater cold tolerance, especially in the spring, ripened earlier and more evenly and had greater fungal disease resistance. Frost tolerance was improved by selecting for late flowering and genetic research identified genes involved in resistance to gall mite and the blackcurrant reversion virus. 'Ben Lomond' was the first of the 'Ben' varieties and was released in 1975. This was followed by several other cultivars for the juicing industry such as 'Ben Alder' and 'Ben Tirran'. The cultivar 'Ben Hope' was released in 1998 with increased tolerance to gall mite, and in the same year, 'Ben Gairn' became available. It shows resistance to the reversion virus. For gardeners and the pick-your-own market, 'Ben Sarek', 'Ben Connan' and 'Big Ben' were introduced and have large, sweet berries. The cultivars 'Ben Connan' and 'Big Ben' have gained the Royal Horticultural Society's Award of Garden Merit. and new varieties are being developed continually to improve frost tolerance, disease resistance, machine harvesting, fruit quality, nutritional content and fruit flavour.

Varieties producing green fruit, less strongly flavoured and sweeter than typical blackcurrants, are cultivated in Finland, where they are called "greencurrants" (viherherukka). In Poland, the Research Institute of Horticulture has done work on improving the blackcurrant with regard to disease and pest resistance, fruit quality, adaptations to local conditions and mechanical harvesting. Researchers have crossed various varieties and introduced inter-specific genetic material from the gooseberry (Ribes grossularia), the redcurrant (Ribes rubrum) and the flowering currant (Ribes sanguineum). The resulting offspring were further back-crossed to R. nigrum. Cultivars produced include 'Tisel' and 'Tiben' in 2000 and 'Ores', 'Ruben' and 'Tines' in 2005. Further cultivars 'Polares' and 'Tihope' are being tested. Since 1991, New Zealand has become an important centre for research and development, as its temperate climate is particularly suitable for cultivation of the crop. Breeding programmes are concentrating on yield, large fruit size, consistency of cropping and upright habit.

In North America, there is a need for this fruit to have resistance to white pine blister rust. New cultivars such as 'Crusader', 'Coronet' and 'Consort' have been developed there by crossing R. nigrum with R. ussuriense and these show resistance to the disease. However the quality and yield of these varieties are poor as compared to non-resistant strains and only Consort is reliably self-fertile. Back-crossing these varieties to a parent have produced new strains such as 'Titania' that have a higher yield, better disease resistance, are more tolerant of adverse weather conditions and are suitable for machine harvesting. Two new releases from a black currant breeding program in British Columbia, Canada, 'Blackcomb' and 'Tahsis', were selected for their immunity to white pine blister rust and their frost tolerance.

== Uses ==
Currants, European black, raw
Nutritional value per 100 g (3.5 oz)
- Energy: 264 kJ (63 kcal)
- Carbohydrates: 15.4 g
- Fat: 0.4 g
- Protein: 1.4 g
Vitamins and minerals
| Vitamins | Quantity %DV^{†} |
| Thiamine (B1) | 4% 0.05 mg |
| Riboflavin (B2) | 4% 0.05 mg |
| Niacin (B3) | 2% 0.3 mg |
| Pantothenic acid (B5) | 8% 0.398 mg |
| Vitamin B6 | 4% 0.066 mg |
| Vitamin C | 201% 181 mg |
| Vitamin E | 7% 1 mg |
| Minerals | Quantity %DV^{†} |
| Calcium | 4% 55 mg |
| Iron | 9% 1.54 mg |
| Magnesium | 6% 24 mg |
| Manganese | 11% 0.256 mg |
| Phosphorus | 5% 59 mg |
| Potassium | 11% 322 mg |
| Sodium | 0% 2 mg |
| Zinc | 2% 0.27 mg |
- Other constituents: Quantity
- Water: 82 g
- Link to USDA Database entry
- ^{†}Percentages estimated using US recommendations for adults, except for potassium, which is estimated based on expert recommendation from the National Academies.

=== Nutrition ===
Raw blackcurrants are 82% water, 15% carbohydrates, 1% protein and 0.4% fat (table). Per 100 g serving providing 63 kilocalories, the raw fruit has high vitamin C content (218% of the Daily Value, DV) and moderate levels of iron and manganese (12% DV each). Other nutrients are present in negligible amounts (less than 10% DV, table).

Blackcurrant seed oil is rich in vitamin E and unsaturated fatty acids, including alpha-linolenic acid and gamma-linolenic acid.

=== History ===
Decoction of the leaves, bark or roots was used as a traditional remedy.

During World War II, most fruits rich in vitamin C, such as oranges, became difficult to obtain in the United Kingdom, as they were mainly imported. Since blackcurrant berries are a rich source of the vitamin, and blackcurrant plants are suitable for growing in the UK climate, the British Government encouraged their cultivation and soon the yield of the nation's crop increased significantly. From 1942 onwards, blackcurrant syrup was distributed free of charge to children under the age of two. This may have given rise to the lasting popularity of blackcurrant as a flavouring in Britain. In Britain the commercial crop is completely mechanised and about 1,400 hectares of the fruit are grown, mostly under contract to the juicing industry. Commercially, most large-scale cultivation of blackcurrants is done in eastern Europe for the juice and juice concentrate market. As of 2017, major cultivation efforts to improve fruit characteristics occurred in Scotland, New Zealand, and Poland.

Blackcurrants were once popular in the United States as well, but became less common in the 20th century after currant farming was banned in the early 1900s, when blackcurrants, as a vector of white pine blister rust, were considered a threat to the U.S. logging industry. The federal ban on growing currants was shifted to the jurisdictions of individual states in 1966, and was lifted in New York State in 2003 through the efforts of horticulturist Greg Quinn. As a result, currant growing is making a comeback in New York, Vermont, Connecticut, California, and Oregon. However, several statewide bans still exist as of August 2021. Since the American federal ban curtailed currant production nationally for nearly a century, the fruit remains largely unknown in the United States and has yet to regain its previous popularity to levels enjoyed in Europe or New Zealand. Owing to its unique flavour and richness in polyphenols, dietary fibre and essential nutrients, awareness and popularity of blackcurrant is once again growing, with a number of consumer products entering the U.S. market.

=== Culinary ===
The fruit of blackcurrants when eaten raw has a strong, tart flavour. It can be made into jams and jellies which set readily because of the fruit's high content of pectin and acid. For culinary use, the fruit is usually cooked with sugar to produce a purée, which can then be passed through muslin to separate the juice. The purée can be used to make blackcurrant preserves and be included in cheesecakes, yogurt, ice cream, desserts, sorbets, and many other sweet dishes. The exceptionally strong flavour can be moderated by combining it with other fruits, such as raspberries and strawberries in summer pudding, or apples in crumbles and pies. The juice can be used in syrups and cordials. Blackcurrants are a common ingredient of rødgrød, a popular kissel-like dessert in North German and Danish cuisines.

Blackcurrants are also used in savoury cooking. Their astringency creates added flavour in sauces, meats and other dishes. Blackcurrants are included in some unusual combinations of foods. They can be added to tomato and mint to make a salad. Blackcurrants may accompany roast beef, grilled lamb, duck, seafood and shellfish. Canvasback duck with blackcurrants was a delicacy in nineteenth century New York. They can provide a dipping sauce at barbecues. They can be blended with mayonnaise, and used to invigorate bananas and other tropical fruits. Blackcurrants can be combined with dark chocolate or added to mincemeat in traditional mince pies at Christmas.

Japan imports US$3.6 million of New Zealand blackcurrants for uses as dietary supplements, snacks, functional food products and as quick-frozen (IQF) produce for culinary production as jams, jellies or preserves.

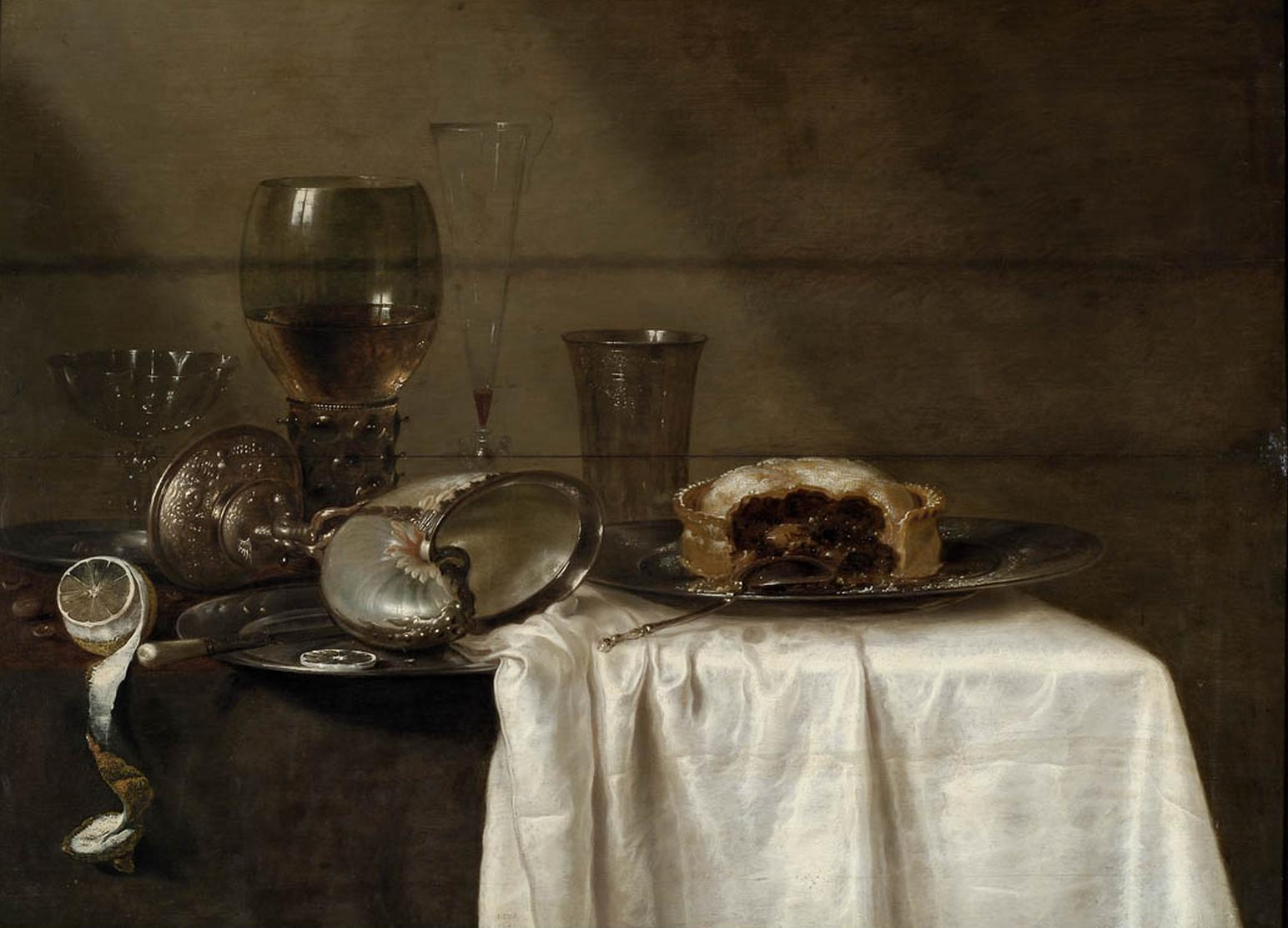
Willem Claesz. Heda,
The Blackcurrant Pie (1641)

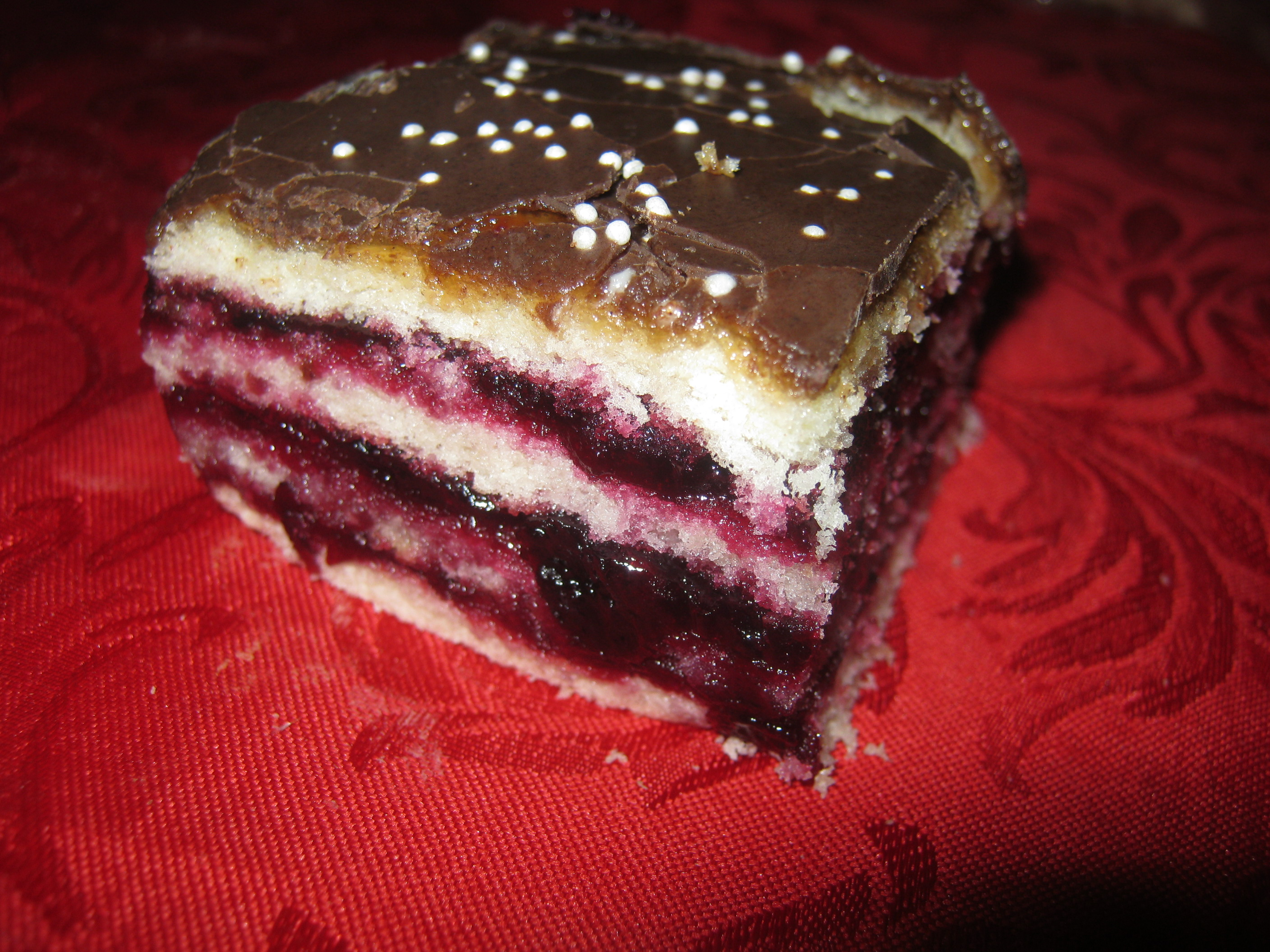
Juodųjų serbentų pyragas (blackcurrant pie), a popular dessert in Lithuanian cuisine

=== Beverages ===
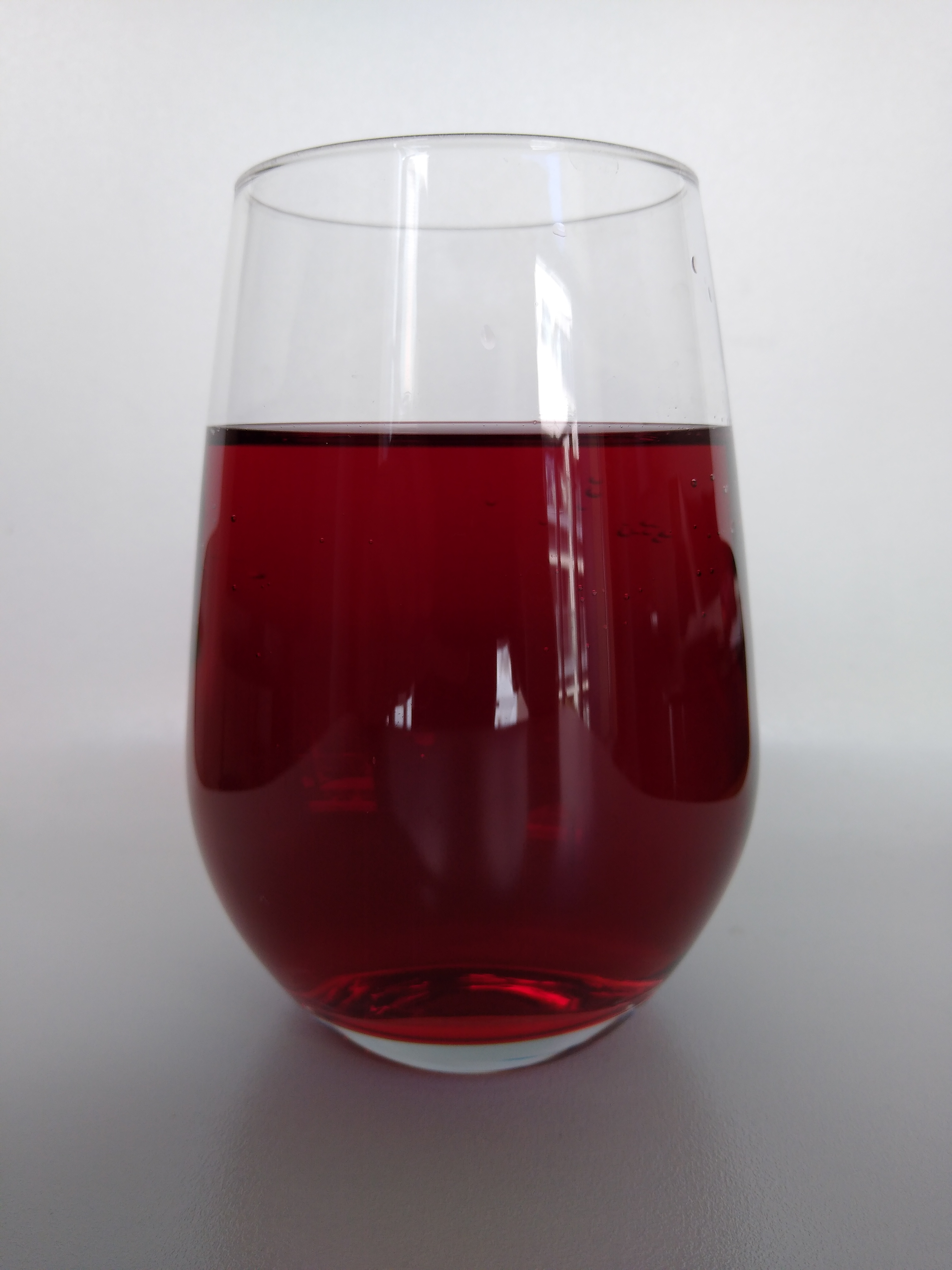
Ribena blackcurrant juice drink

The juice forms the basis for various squashes, juice drinks, and smoothies. In Britain, 95% of the blackcurrants grown are used to manufacture Ribena (a brand of fruit juice whose name is derived from Ribes nigrum) and similar fruit syrups and juices. Macerated blackcurrants are also the primary ingredient in the apéritif, crème de cassis, which in turn is added to white wine to produce a Kir or to champagne to make a Kir Royal.

In the UK, a blackcurrant squash may be mixed with beer or alcoholic cider to make drinks including "cider and black", "lager and black", or "snakebite and black".

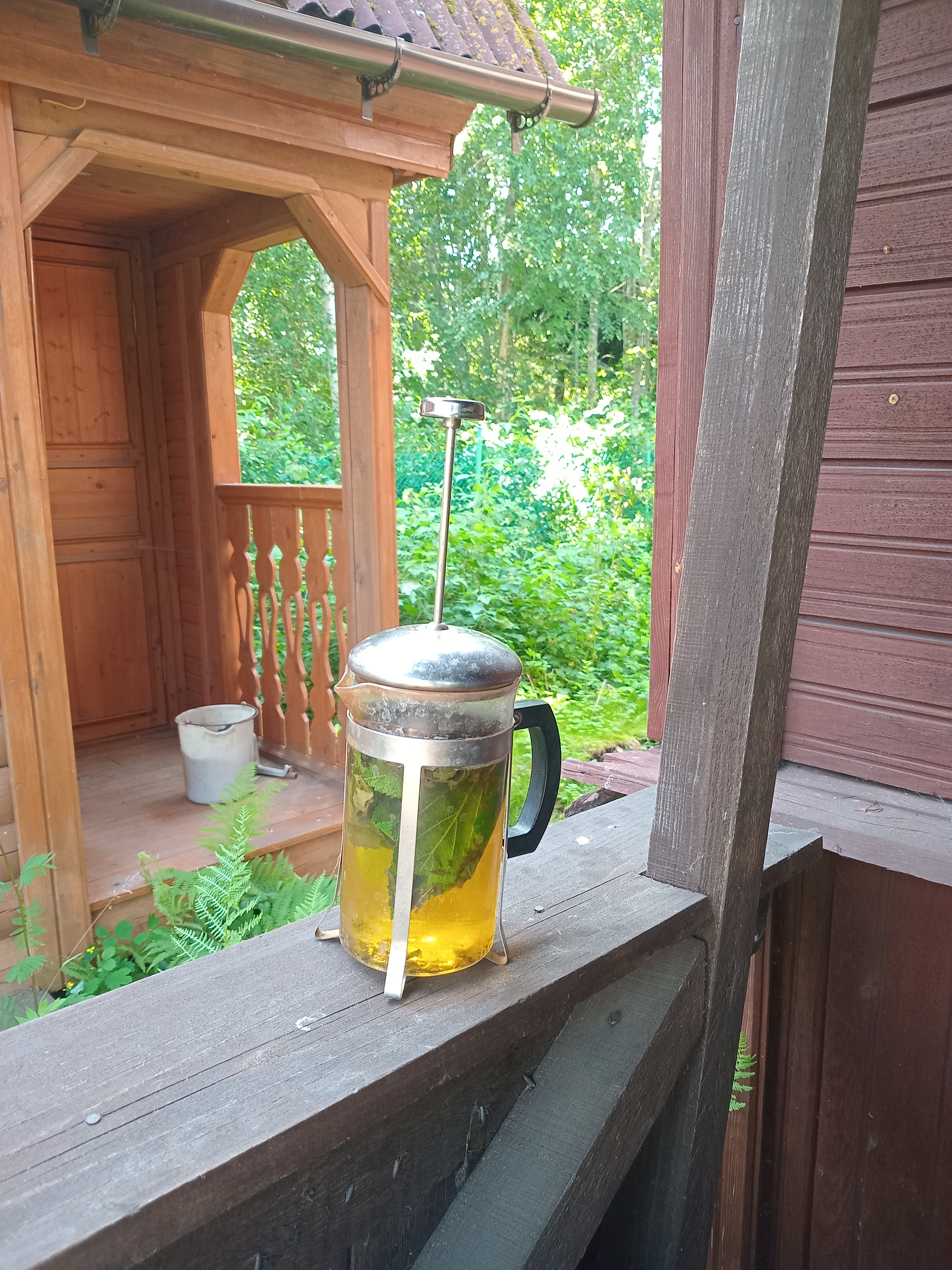
Tea with fresh black currant leaves

In Russia, blackcurrant leaves may be used for flavoring tea or preserves, such as pickled cucumbers, and berries for home winemaking. Sweetened vodka may also be infused with blackcurrant leaves making a deep greenish-yellow beverage with a tart flavor and astringent taste. The berries may be infused in a similar manner.

In the Netherlands, blackcurrants are used in a carbonated soft drink named "cassis", not to be confused with the alcoholic crème de cassis liqueur. The variety by Hero has been made since 1938 with blackcurrant juice concentrate as well as a small quantity of fermented blackcurrant juice.

Blackcurrant seed oil is an ingredient in cosmetics preparations, often in combination with vitamin E. The leaves can be extracted to yield a yellow dye, and the fruit is a source for a blue or violet dye resulting from its rich content of anthocyanins.

== Perfumery ==
The unopened buds of blackcurrant are distilled for their essential oil for use in perfumery. The fruity/terpenic aroma is described as "terpenic, nutmeg, neroli, basil, marjoram".

== See also ==
- Jostaberry
- White currant
