= Gooseberry sawfly =

The English name gooseberry sawfly refers to at least three species of sawfly:

- Nematus ribesii, the common gooseberry sawfly or imported currentworm
- Nematus leucotrochus, the pale-spotted gooseberry sawfly
- Pristiphora appendiculata, the small gooseberry sawfly
