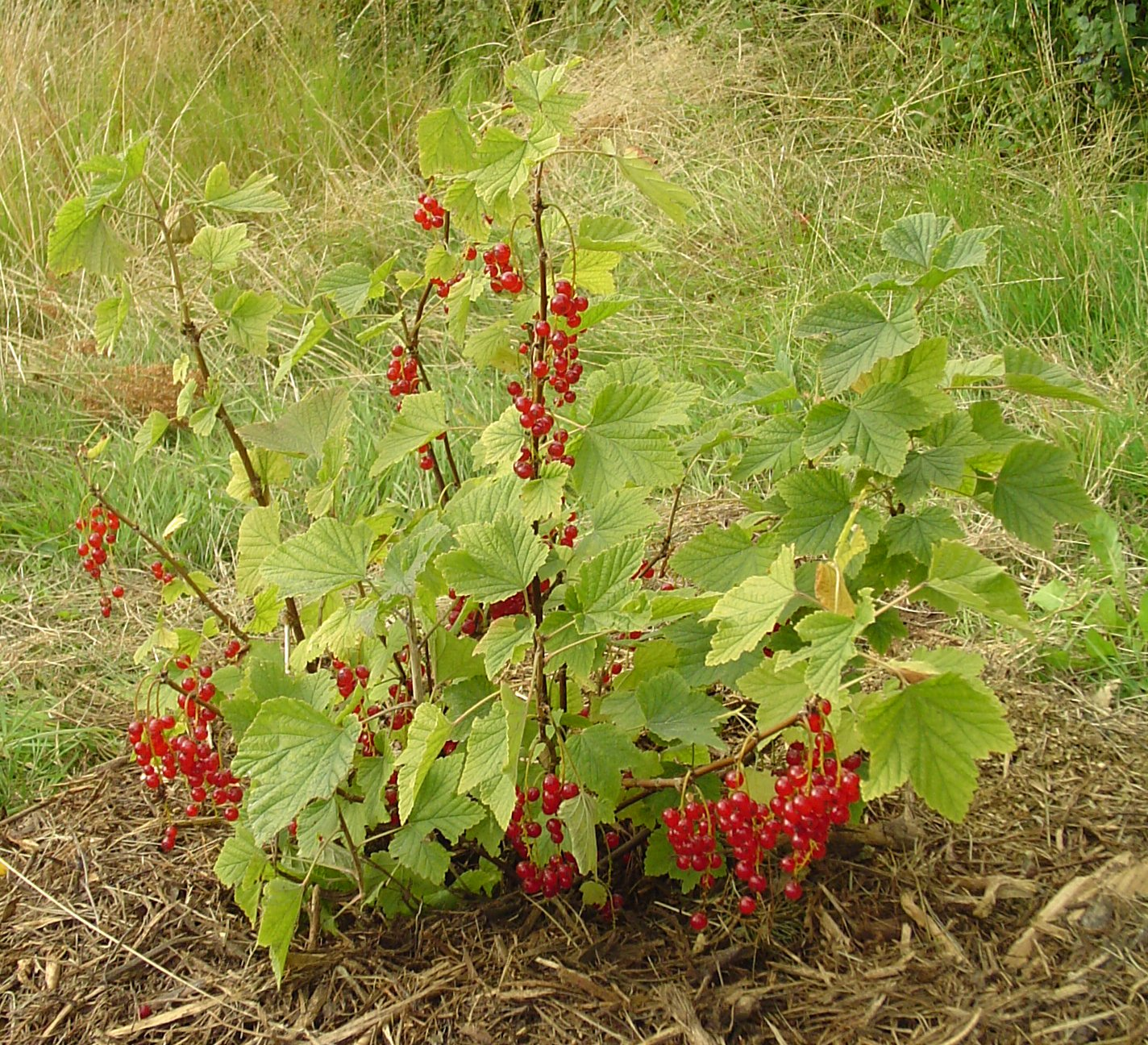
- Cultivated redcurrant

Scientific classification
- Kingdom: Plantae
- Clade: Tracheophytes
- Clade: Angiosperms
- Clade: Eudicots
- Order: Saxifragales
- Family: Grossulariaceae
- Genus: Ribes
- Species: R. rubrum

Binomial name
- Ribes rubrum L., 1753

Synonyms
- List: Grossularia rubra (L.) Scop. (1771); Ribes acerifolium K.Koch (1869); Ribes acidum Ehrh. (1790); Ribes albescens Poit. & Turpin (1846); Ribes albicans Poit. & Turpin (1846); Ribes albovirens Poit. & Turpin (1846); Ribes auriculatum Poit. & Turpin (1846); Ribes baicalense Turcz. ex Steud. (1841); Ribes carneum Poit. & Turpin (1846); Ribes domesticum Jancz. (1900); Ribes fleischmannii Rchb. ex K.Koch (1869); Ribes glabrum (Hedl.) Sennikov (2001); Ribes hladnickianum Freyer ex Steud. (1841); Ribes hortense Hedl. (1901); Ribes houghtonianum Jancz. (1901); Ribes macrocarpum Jancz. (1900); Ribes officinarum Dum.Cours. (1811); Ribes pendulum Salisb. (1796); Ribes racemosum Poit. & Turpin (1846); Ribes sativum (Rchb.) A.Berger (1924); Ribes sativum f. macrocarpum (Jancz.) Rehder (1949); Ribes sativum var. variegatum (Weston) Rehder (1927); Ribes sativum f. variegatum (Weston) Rehder (1949); Ribes sibiricum K.Koch (1869); Ribes smidtianum (Sow. ex Syme) Hedl. (1901); Ribes sylvestre (Lam.) Mert. & W.D.J.Koch (1826); Ribes sylvestre subsp. hortense Hyl. (1945); Ribes sylvestre var. smidtianum Sow. ex Syme (1865); Ribes vinosum Dum.Cours. (1802); Ribes vulgare Lam. (1789); Ribes vulgare var. hortense Lam. (1789); Ribes vulgare var. sylvestre Lam. (1789); Ribesium rubrum (L.) Medik. (1789)

= Redcurrant =

Species of flowering plant

The redcurrant or red currant (Ribes rubrum) is a member of the genus Ribes in the family Grossulariaceae. It is native to western Europe. The species is widely cultivated and has escaped into the wild in many regions.

== Description ==
The redcurrant or red currant (Ribes rubrum) is a member of the genus Ribes in the family Grossulariaceae. The species is native to western Europe. Ribes rubrum is a deciduous shrub normally growing to 1–1.5 metres (3 1/2–5 feet) tall, occasionally 2 m (7 ft), with five-lobed leaves arranged spirally on the stems. The flowers are inconspicuous yellow-green, in pendulous 4–8-centimetre (1 1/2–3 1/4-inch) racemes, maturing into bright red translucent edible berries about 8–12 millimetres (3/8–1/2 in) diameter; the wild plant has 3–10 berries on each raceme. The plant is self-pollinating but produces more fruit when pollinated by another plant of a different variety. An established bush can produce 3–4 kilograms (6 1/2–8 3/4 pounds) of berries from mid- to late summer.

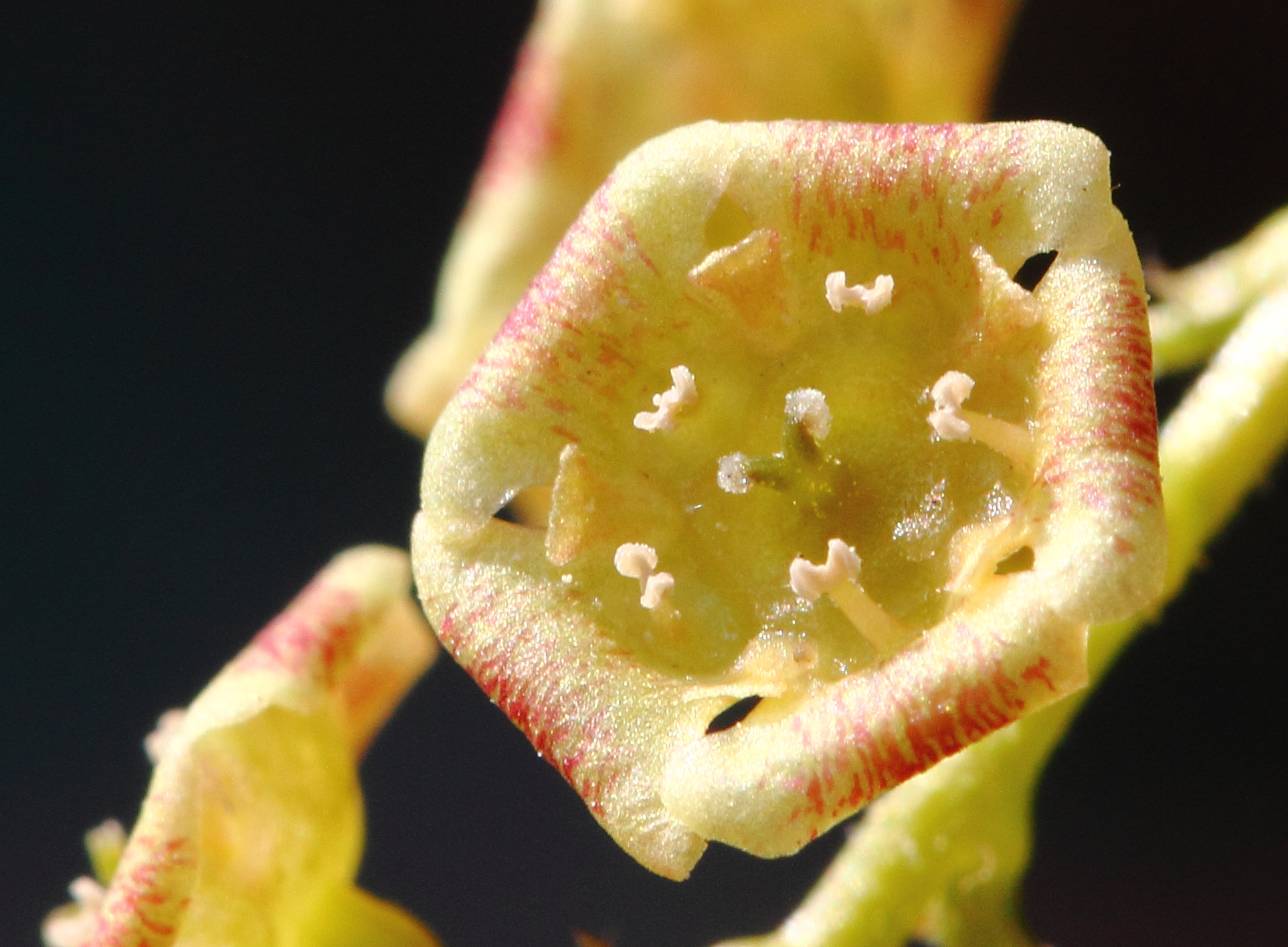
Close-up of flower

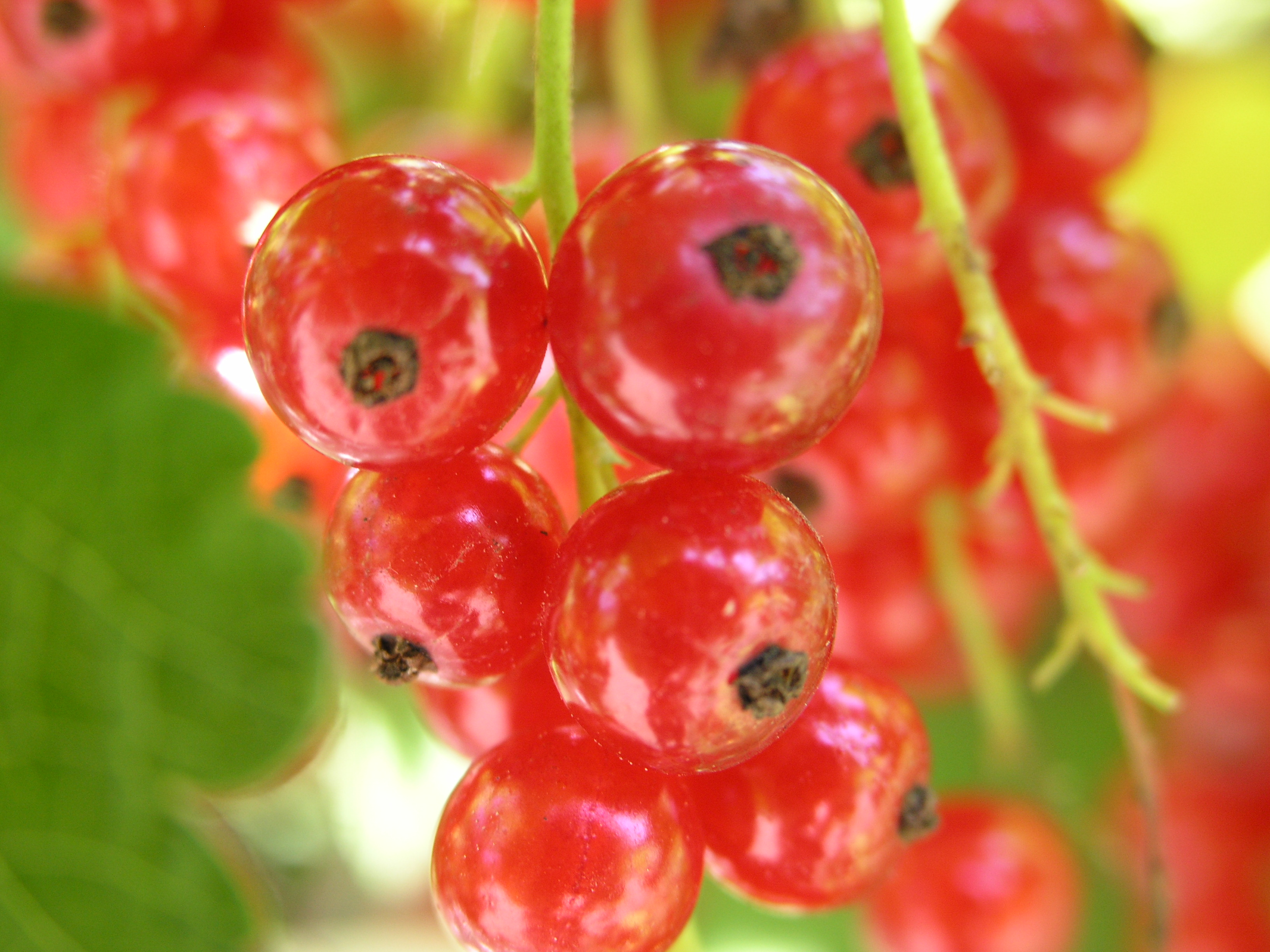
Redcurrant berries

=== Phytochemicals ===
Redcurrant fruits are known for their tart flavor, a characteristic provided by a relatively high content of organic acids and mixed polyphenols. As many as 65 different phenolic compounds may contribute to the astringent properties of redcurrants, with these contents increasing during the last month of ripening. Twenty-five individual polyphenols and other nitrogen-containing phytochemicals in redcurrant juice have been isolated specifically with the astringent flavor profile sensed in the human tongue.

== Cultivation ==
Currant bushes prefer a level of sunlight ranging from partial to full and can grow in most types of soil. They are relatively low-maintenance plants and can also be used as ornamentation.

=== Cultivars ===
Although R. rubrum is native to Europe, large-berried cultivars of the redcurrant were first produced in Belgium and northern France in the 17th century. In modern times numerous cultivars have been selected; some of these have escaped from gardens and can be found in the wild across Europe and extending into Asia. The white currant is a cultivar of R. rubrum. Although it is a sweeter and less-pigmented variant of the redcurrant, not a separate botanical species, it is sometimes marketed with names such as R. sativum or R. silvestre or sold as a different fruit.

Many redcurrant and whitecurrant cultivars are available for domestic cultivation from specialist growers. The following have gained the Royal Horticultural Society's Award of Garden Merit:

- 'Jonkheer van Tets'
- 'Red Lake'
- 'Stanza'
- 'White Grape' (whitecurrant)

== Uses ==
=== Nutrition ===
Currants, red and white, raw
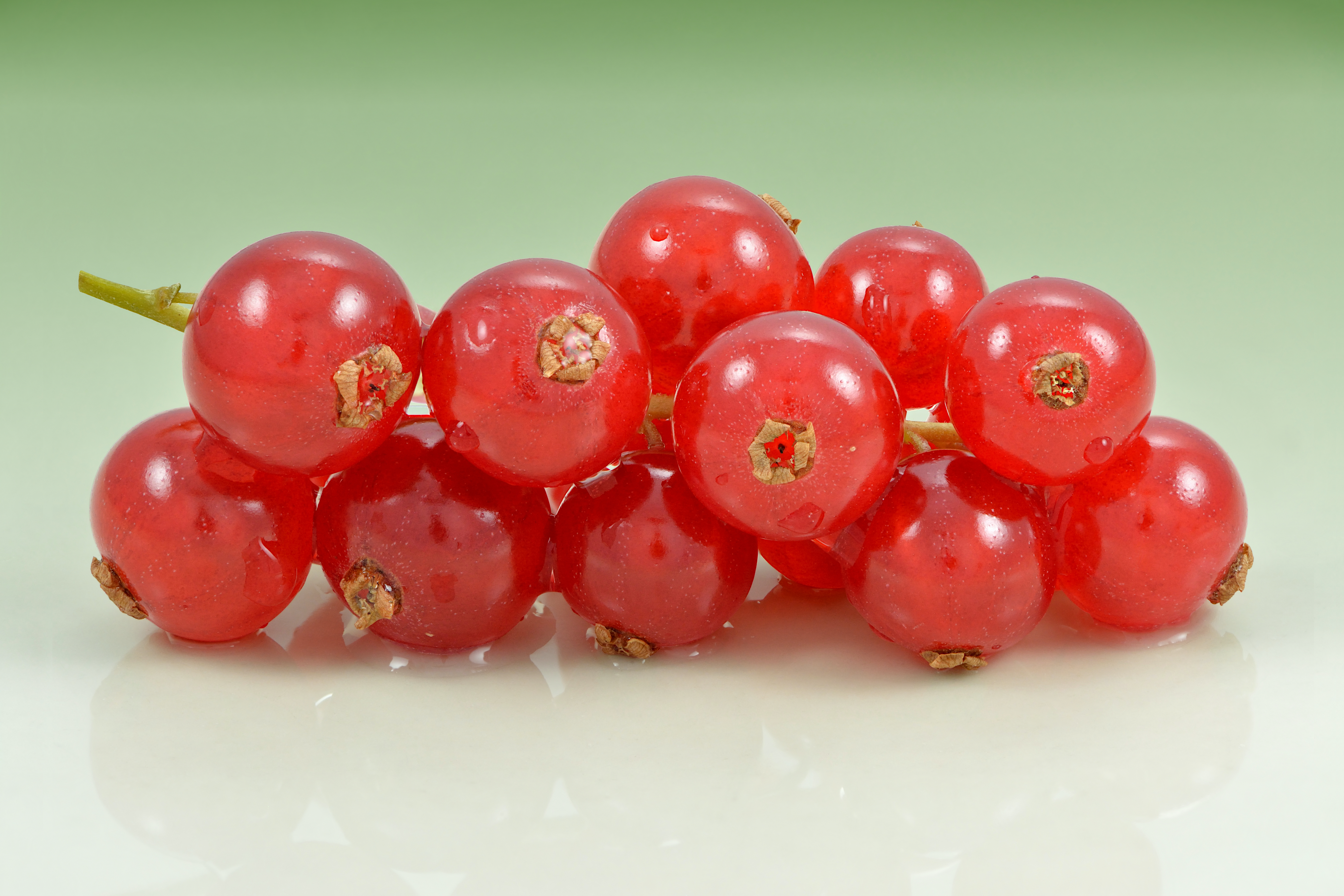

Nutritional value per 100 g (3.5 oz)
- Energy: 234 kJ (56 kcal)
- Carbohydrates: 13.8 g
- Sugars: 7.37 g
- Dietary fiber: 4.3 g
- Fat: 0.2 g
- Protein: 1.4 g
Vitamins and minerals
| Vitamins | Quantity %DV^{†} |
| Thiamine (B1) | 3% 0.04 mg |
| Riboflavin (B2) | 4% 0.05 mg |
| Niacin (B3) | 1% 0.1 mg |
| Pantothenic acid (B5) | 1% 0.064 mg |
| Vitamin B6 | 4% 0.07 mg |
| Folate (B9) | 2% 8 μg |
| Choline | 1% 7.6 mg |
| Vitamin C | 46% 41 mg |
| Vitamin E | 1% 0.1 mg |
| Vitamin K | 9% 11 μg |
| Minerals | Quantity %DV^{†} |
| Calcium | 3% 33 mg |
| Iron | 6% 1 mg |
| Magnesium | 3% 13 mg |
| Manganese | 8% 0.186 mg |
| Phosphorus | 4% 44 mg |
| Potassium | 9% 275 mg |
| Sodium | 0% 1 mg |
| Zinc | 2% 0.23 mg |
- Other constituents: Quantity
- Water: 84 g
- Link to USDA Database entry
- ^{†}Percentages estimated using US recommendations for adults, except for potassium, which is estimated based on expert recommendation from the National Academies.

Redcurrants, white currants and pinkcurrants are cultivated for their fruit. Raw red or white currants are 84% water, 14% carbohydrates, 1% protein, and contain negligible fat (table). In a reference amount of 100 grams (3 1/2 ounces), redcurrants supply 234 kilojoules (56 kilocalories) of food energy, and are a rich source of vitamin C (46% of the Daily Value, DV), with no other micronutrients in significant content (less than 10% DV, table).

=== Culinary ===
With maturity the tart flavour of redcurrant fruit is slightly greater than its blackcurrant relative but with the same approximate sweetness. The white-fruited variant of redcurrant, often referred to as white currant, has the same tart flavour but with greater sweetness. Although frequently cultivated for jams and cooked preparations, much like the white currant, it is often served raw or as a simple accompaniment in salads, garnishes or drinks when in season.

In the United Kingdom redcurrant jelly is a condiment often served with lamb, game meat including venison, turkey and goose in a festive or Sunday roast. It is essentially a jam and is made in the same way, by adding the redcurrants to sugar, boiling and straining. In France the highly rarefied and hand-made Bar-le-duc or "Lorraine jelly" is a spreadable preparation traditionally made from white currants or alternatively redcurrants. The pips are taken out by hand, originally by monks, with a goose feather, before cooking.

In Scandinavia and Schleswig-Holstein it is often used in fruit soups and summer puddings (rødgrød, rote Grütze or rode grütt). In Germany it is also used in combination with custard or meringue as a filling for tarts.

In German-speaking areas syrup or nectar derived from the redcurrant is added to soda water and enjoyed as a refreshing drink named Johannisbeerschorle. It is so named because the redcurrants (Johannisbeeren, "John's berry" in German) are said to ripen first on St John's Day, also known as Midsummer Day, June 24. In Linz, Austria it is the most commonly used filling for the Linzer torte. It can be enjoyed in its fresh state without the addition of sugar.

In Russia redcurrants are ubiquitous and used in jams, preserves, compotes and desserts. It is also used to make kissel, a sweet dessert made from fresh berries or fruits (such as redcurrants, cherries and cranberries). The leaves have many uses in traditional medicine, such as making an infusion with black tea.

== Sources ==
- Andrew, Thomas (1844). A Cyclopedia of Domestic Medicine and Surgery. Edinburgh, UK: Blackie and Son. OCLC 1045240484.
- Lim, T.K. (2012). Edible Medicinal And Non-Medicinal Plants. Vol. 4. Springer. ISBN 9789400740532.
