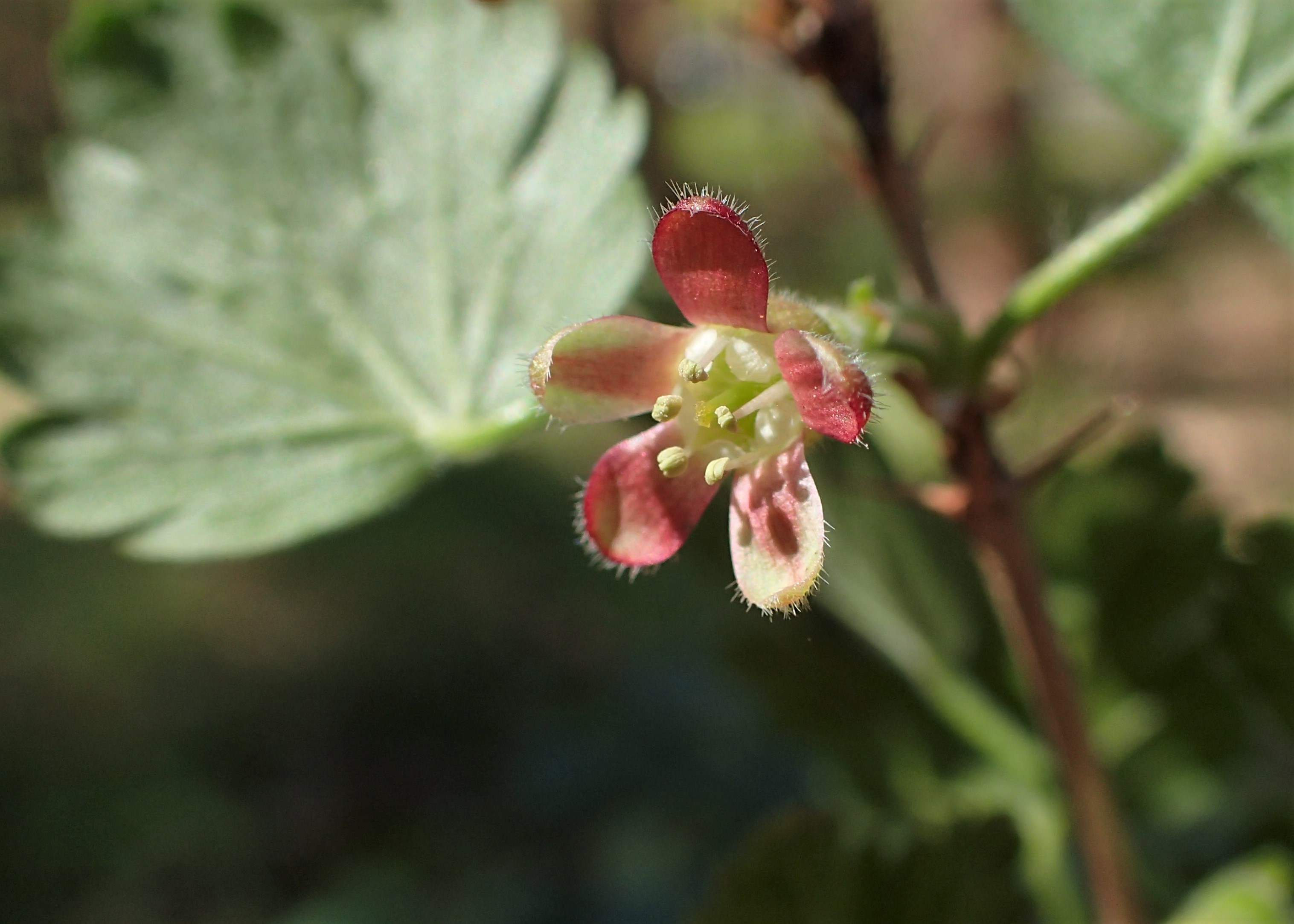
- In flower

Scientific classification
- Kingdom: Plantae
- Clade: Embryophytes
- Clade: Tracheophytes
- Clade: Spermatophytes
- Clade: Angiosperms
- Clade: Eudicots
- Order: Saxifragales
- Family: Grossulariaceae
- Genus: Ribes
- Species: R. uva-crispa

Binomial name
- Ribes uva-crispa L.

Synonyms
- List: Grossularia glandulososetosa Opiz; Grossularia hirsuta Mill.; Grossularia intermedia Opiz; Grossularia pubescens Opiz; Grossularia reclinata (L.) Mill.; Grossularia spinosa (Lam.) Rupr.; Grossularia uva Scop.; Grossularia uva-crispa (L.) Mill.; Grossularia vulgaris Spach; Oxyacanthus sativus Chevall.; Oxyacanthus uva-crispa (L.) Chevall.; Ribes aculeatum Salisb.; Ribes caucasicum Adams ex Schult.; Ribes crispum Dulac; Ribes dubium Jacques; Ribes grossularia L.; Ribes grossularium St.-Lag.; Ribes hybridum Besser; Ribes reclinatum L.; Ribes spinosum Lam.

= Ribes uva-crispa =

Species of flowering plant

Ribes uva-crispa, commonly known as the gooseberry or European gooseberry, is a species of flowering shrub native to Europe, northwestern Africa, and southwestern Asia. It belongs to the family Grossulariaceae, which includes currants and gooseberries. The plant is cultivated for its edible fruit, which is used in culinary applications ranging from desserts to preserves.

== Etymology ==
The goose in gooseberry has been seen as a corruption of either the Dutch word kruisbes or the allied German Krausbeere, or of the earlier forms of the French groseille. Alternatively, the word has been connected to the Middle High German krus ('curl, crisped'), in Latin as grossularia (also the name of its subgenus within Ribes).

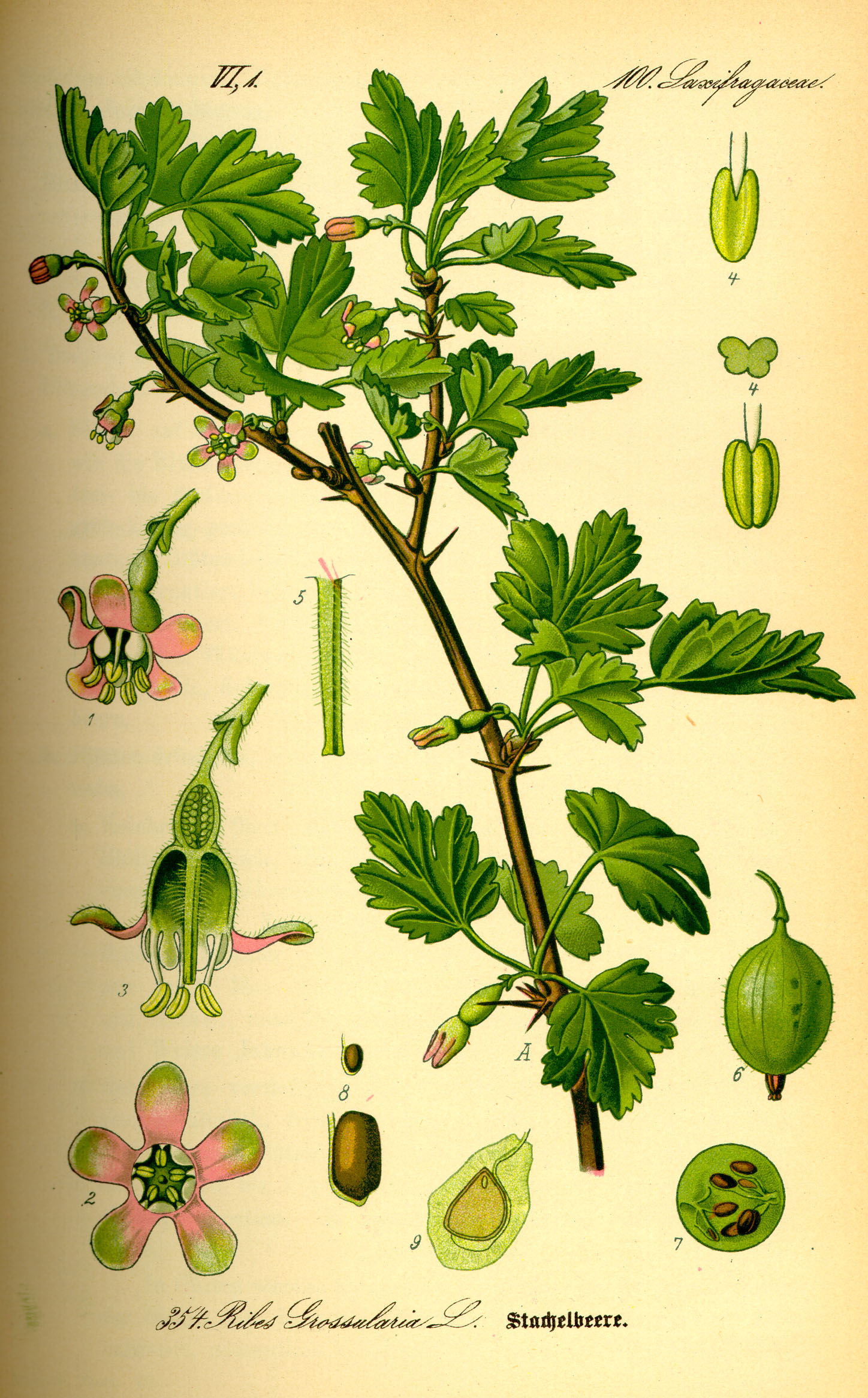
1885 illustration by Otto Wilhelm Thomé showing the distinctive curl of the flower petals

However, the Oxford English Dictionary takes the more literal derivation from goose and berry as probable because "the grounds on which plants and fruits have received names associating them with animals are so often inexplicable that the inappropriateness in the meaning does not necessarily give good grounds for believing that the word is an etymological corruption". The French for gooseberry is groseille à maquereau, translated as 'mackerel berries', due to their use in a sauce for mackerel in old French cuisine. In Britain, gooseberries may informally be called goosegogs.

== Description ==
The gooseberry is a straggling bush growing to 1.5 metres (5 feet) in height and width, the branches being thickly set with sharp spines, standing out singly or in diverging tufts of two or three from the bases of the short spurs or lateral leaf shoots. The bell-shaped flowers are produced, singly or in pairs, from the groups of rounded, deeply crenated 3 or 5 lobed leaves.

The fruits are berries, smaller in wild gooseberries than the cultivated varieties, but often of good flavor. The berries are usually green, but there are red, purple, yellow, and white variants.

== Distribution and habitat ==
It is native to Europe, the Caucasus and northern Africa. Its exact native distribution is unclear, since it may have escaped from cultivation and become naturalized. For example, in Britain, some sources consider it to be native, others to be an introduction. The species is also occasionally naturalized in scattered locations in North America.

It grows in alpine areas and rocky forests.

== Cultivation ==
Gooseberry growing was popular in the 19th century, as described in 1879:

In Britain, it is often found in copses and hedgerows and about old ruins, but the gooseberry has been cultivated for so long that it is difficult to distinguish wild bushes from feral ones, or to determine where the gooseberry fits into the native flora of the island. Common as it is now on some of the lower slopes of the Alps of Piedmont and Savoy, it is uncertain whether the Romans were acquainted with the gooseberry, though it may possibly be alluded to in a vague passage of Pliny the Elder's Natural History; the hot summers of Italy, in ancient times as at present, would be unfavourable to its cultivation. Although gooseberries are now abundant in Germany and France, it does not appear to have been much grown there in the Middle Ages, though the wild fruit was held in some esteem medicinally for the cooling properties of its acid juice in fevers; while the old English name, Fea-berry, still surviving in some provincial dialects, indicates that it was similarly valued in Britain, where it was planted in gardens at a comparatively early period. William Turner describes the gooseberry in his Herball, written about the middle of the 16th century, and a few years later it is mentioned in one of Thomas Tusser's quaint rhymes as an ordinary object of garden culture. Improved varieties were probably first raised by the skilful gardeners of Holland, whose name for the fruit, Kruisbezie, may have been corrupted into the present English vernacular word. Towards the end of the 18th century the gooseberry became a favourite object of cottage-horticulture, especially in Lancashire, where the working cotton-spinners raised numerous varieties from seed, their efforts having been chiefly directed to increasing the size of the fruit.

== In culture ==
Gooseberry bush was 19th-century slang for pubic hair, and from this comes the saying that babies are "born under a gooseberry bush".
