= Black gooseberry =

Black gooseberry can refer to:

- Ribes divaricatum, coast black gooseberry
- Ribes lacustre, bristly black gooseberry
- Ribes oxyacanthoides ssp. irriguum, inland black gooseberry

== See also ==
- Black currant (disambiguation)
- Jostaberry, a black currant—gooseberry hybrid
