= Black currant (disambiguation) =

Blackcurrant, Ribes nigrum, is a woody shrub grown for its berries.

Black currant or blackcurrant may also refer to:

== Plants ==
- Carissa spinarum, a tropical plant native to areas around the Indian Ocean
- Ribes americanum, American black currant
- Ribes hudsonianum, northern black currant, native to North America
- Ribes laxiflorum, trailing black currant
- Ribes ussuriense, Korean blackcurrant, in the genus Ribes
- Zante currant, dried Black Corinth grapes

== Other ==
- The Black Currant, a character in the comic strip Thrud the Barbarian
- Operation Blackcurrant in the UK, to maintain electrical supply during the extreme weather of early 1947

== See also ==
- Black Current (disambiguation)
- Black gooseberry
- Currant (disambiguation)
- Current (disambiguation)
