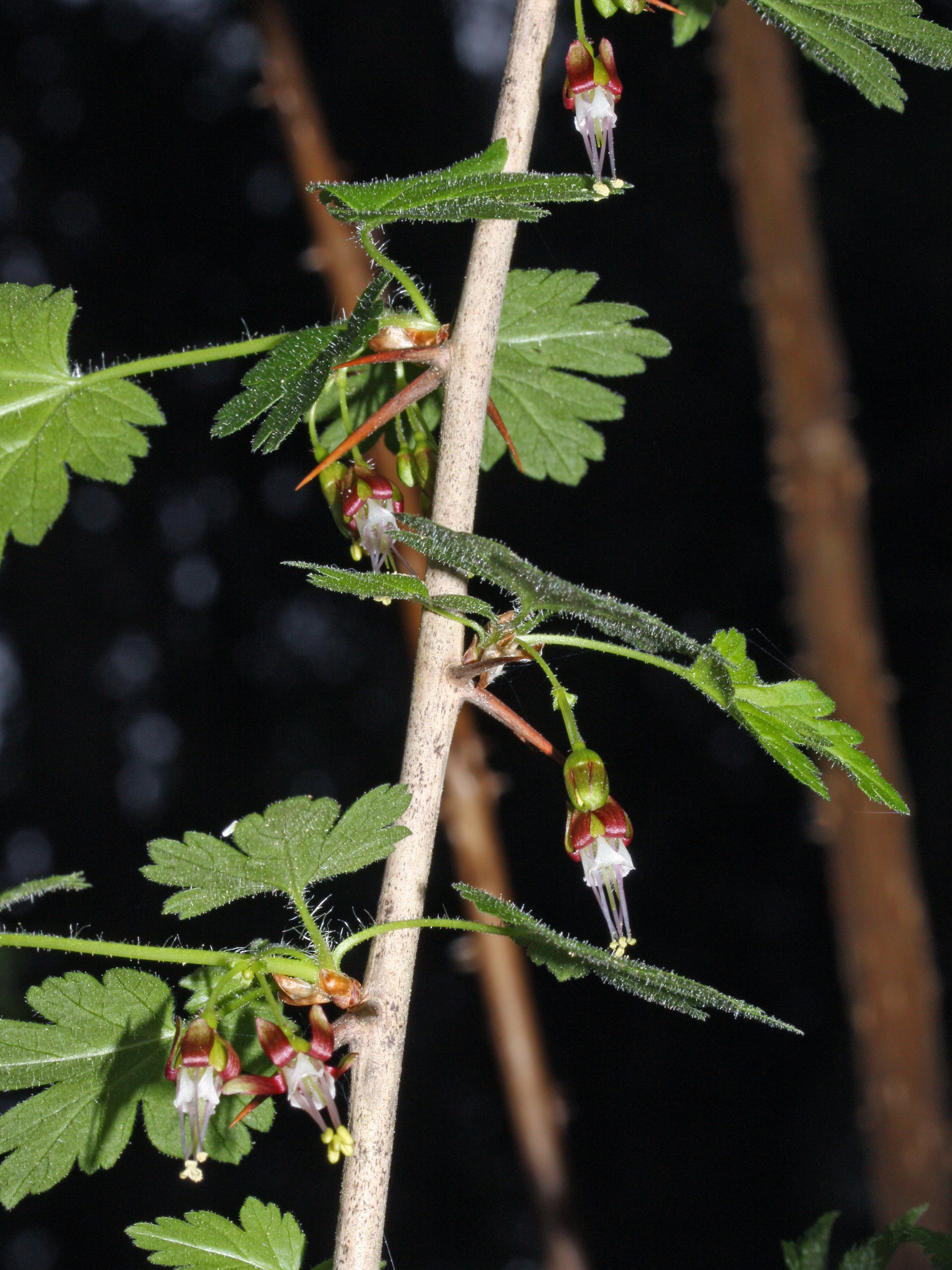

Scientific classification
- Kingdom: Plantae
- Clade: Tracheophytes
- Clade: Angiosperms
- Clade: Eudicots
- Order: Saxifragales
- Family: Grossulariaceae
- Genus: Ribes
- Species: R. divaricatum

Binomial name
- Ribes divaricatum Douglas

Synonyms
- List: Ribes divaricatum var. douglasii Jancz.; Ribes divaricatum var. glabriflorum Koehne in Koehne; Ribes divaricatum var. rigidum M.Peck; Grossularia divaricata Coville & Britton; Ribes parishii A.Heller; Ribes divaricatum subsp. parishii (A.Heller) A.E.Murray; Ribes divaricatum var. montanum Jancz.

= Ribes divaricatum =

Species of currant

Ribes divaricatum is a species in the genus Ribes found in the forests, woodlands, and coastal scrub of western North America from British Columbia to California. The three accepted varieties have various common names which include the word "gooseberry". Other common names include coast black gooseberry, wild gooseberry, Worcesterberry, or spreading-branched gooseberry.

== Description ==
Ribes divaricatum is a shrub sometimes reaching 3 metres (10 feet) in height with woody branches with one to three thick brown spines at leaf nodes. The leaves are borne on petioles, up to 6 centimetres (2 1/4 inches) long and 2.5–6.5 cm (1–2 1/2 in) wide. They are generally palmate in shape, 3–5 lobed and edged with teeth.

The inflorescence is a small cluster of hanging flowers, each with reflexed purple-tinted green sepals and smaller, white to red petals encircling long, protruding stamens. The fruit is a sweet-tasting purplish-black berry up to 1 cm (1/2 in) wide.

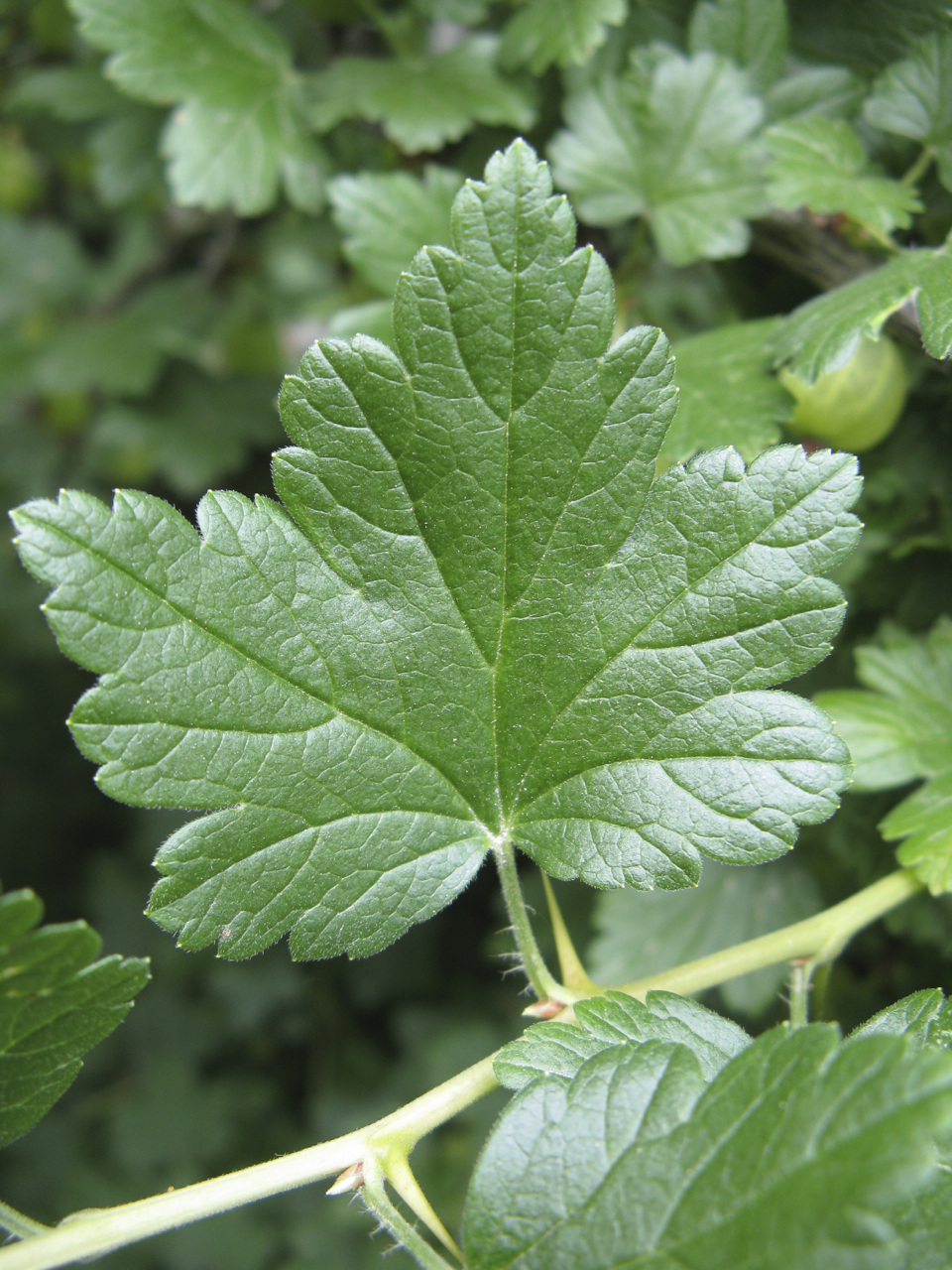
Leaf

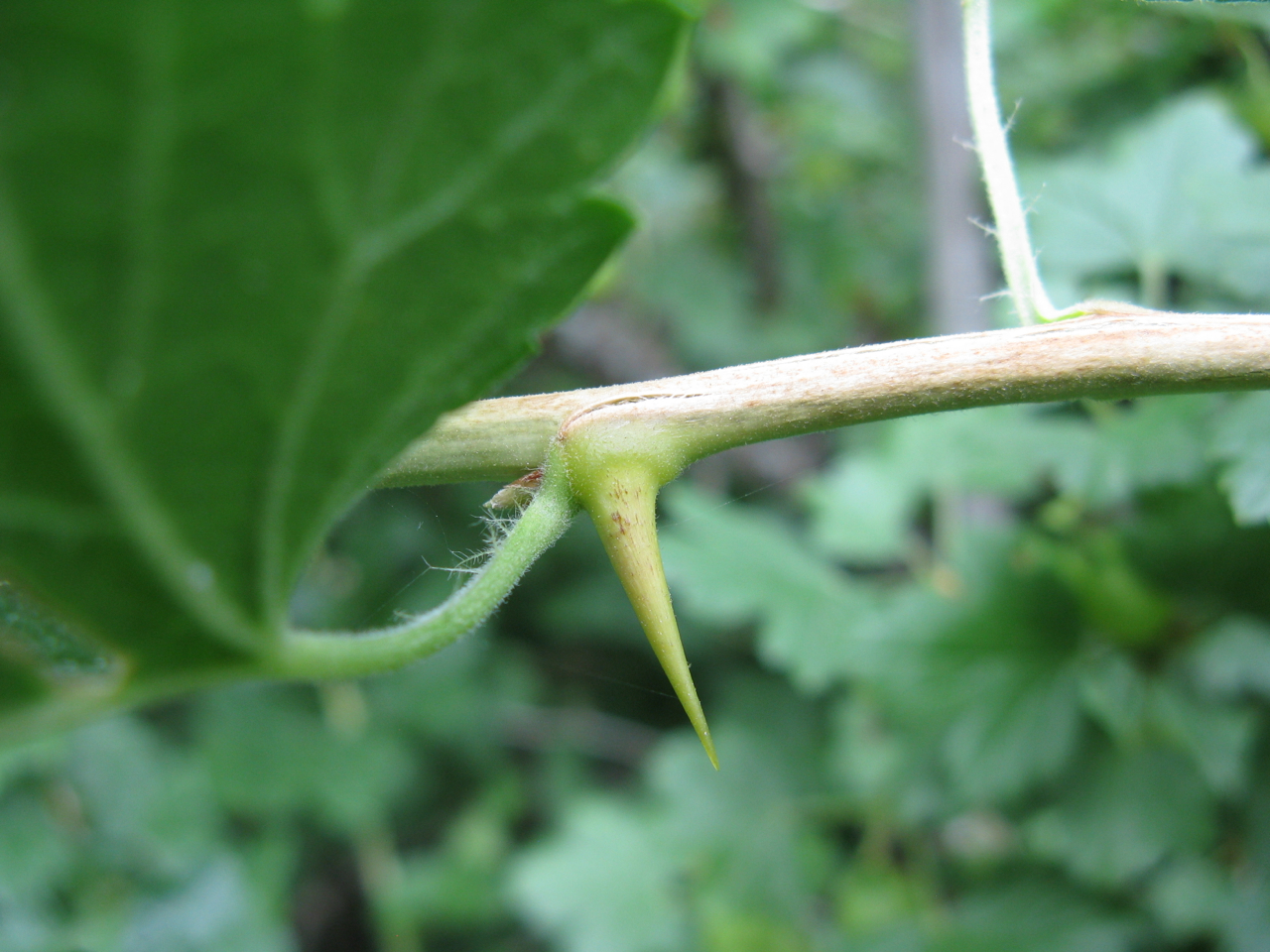
Spine close-up

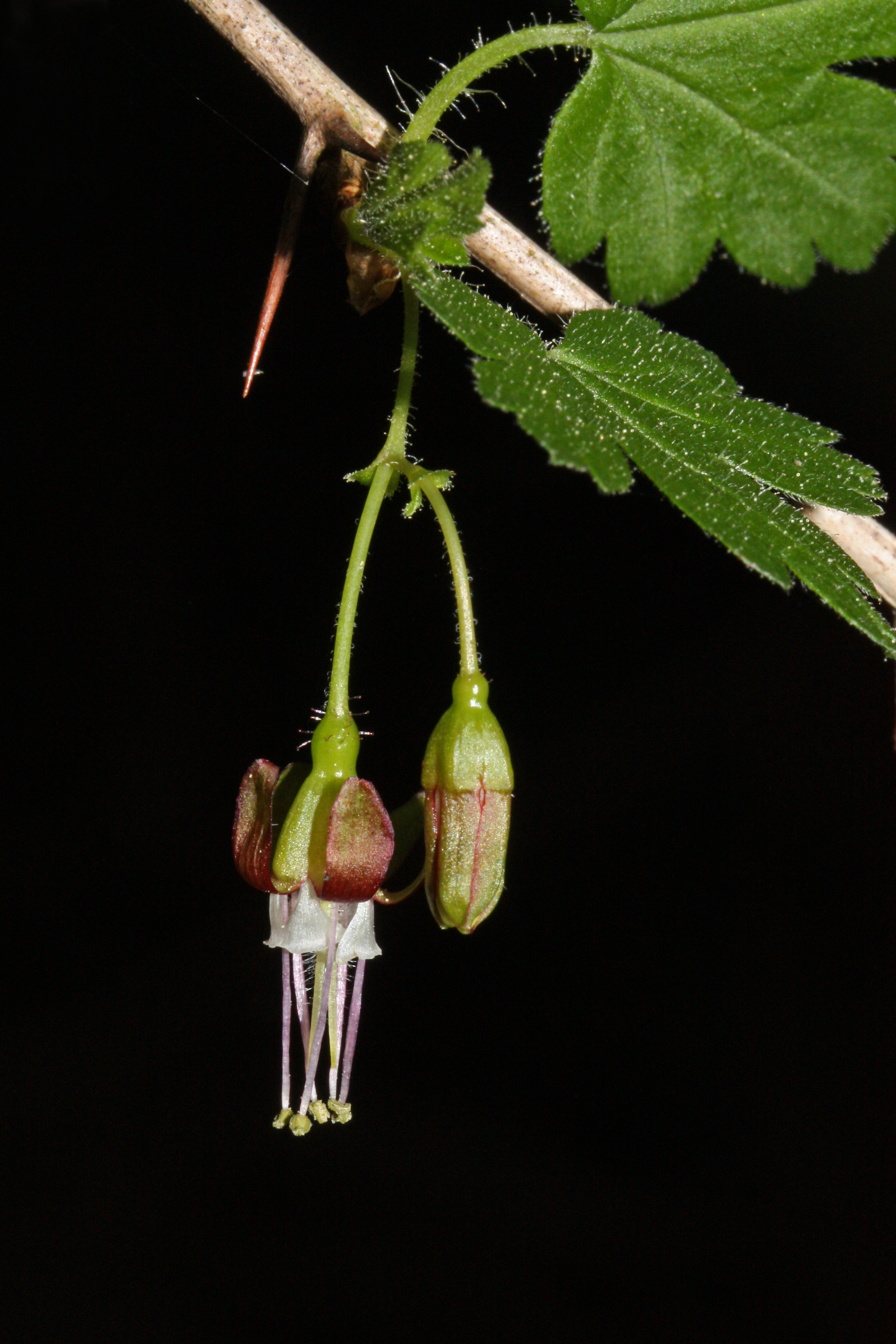
Flowers

=== Similar species ===
It is similar to Ribes lacustre and R. lobbii, but the former has smaller, reddish to maroon flowers and the latter has reddish flowers that resemble those of fuchsias and sticky leaves.

== Taxonomy ==
Varieties

- Ribes divaricatum var. divaricatum, or spreading gooseberry is found in Oregon, Washington, and British Columbia.
- Ribes divaricatum var. parishii, called Parish's gooseberry, is found only in California.
- Ribes divaricatum var. pubiflorum, known as straggly gooseberry is native to both California and Oregon.

== Uses ==
The berries are ripe when black and edible.

The fruit was food for a number of Native American groups of the Pacific Northwest, and other parts of the plant, especially the bark, was used for medicinal purposes.
