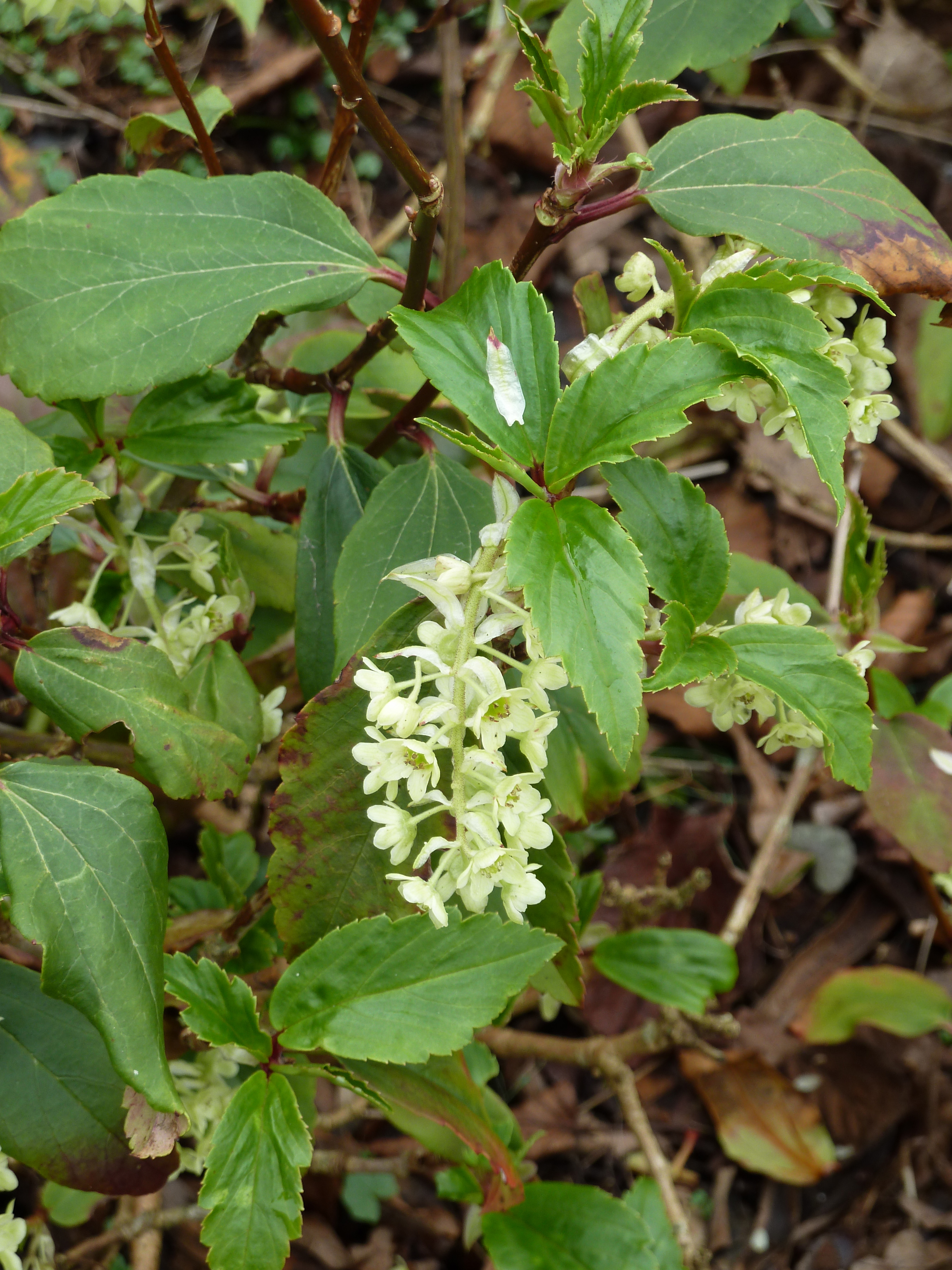

Scientific classification
- Kingdom: Plantae
- Clade: Tracheophytes
- Clade: Angiosperms
- Clade: Eudicots
- Order: Saxifragales
- Family: Grossulariaceae
- Genus: Ribes
- Species: R. laurifolium

Binomial name
- Ribes laurifolium Jancz.

= Ribes laurifolium =

Species of flowering plant

Ribes laurifolium, the laurel-leaved currant, is a species of flowering plant in the family Grossulariaceae, native to China, in Guizhou, West Sichuan and Yunnan.

== Overview ==
Growing to a maximum of 1 m (3.3 ft) tall by 1.5 m (4.9 ft) broad, this evergreen, dioecious shrub has laurel-shaped leaves, and bears pendent clusters of creamy flowers with a green tinge, in winter and early spring. These are followed on female plants by red fruits turning black in autumn.

In gardens it is a suitable subject for a sunny, sheltered spot in reliably moist soil.
