= Black Current (disambiguation) =

Black Current or Black Currents can refer to:

- Black Current, electric car
- Kuroshio Current in the western Pacific Ocean
- Black Currents, album by Rachel Sermanni
- Dark current (physics), the electric current that flows through a photosensitive device when no photons are entering the device

== See also ==
- Black currant (disambiguation)
