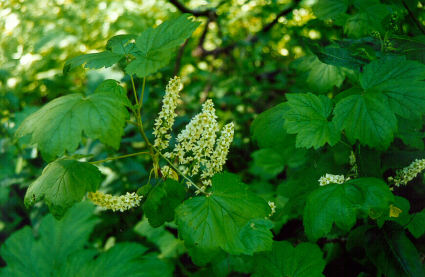
- R. hudsonianum growing in Clearwater National Forest

Conservation status
- Secure (NatureServe)

Scientific classification
- Kingdom: Plantae
- Clade: Tracheophytes
- Clade: Angiosperms
- Clade: Eudicots
- Order: Saxifragales
- Family: Grossulariaceae
- Genus: Ribes
- Species: R. hudsonianum

Binomial name
- Ribes hudsonianum Richardson

Varieties
- R. h. var. hudsonianum; R. h. var. petiolare (Douglas) Jancz.

= Ribes hudsonianum =

Northern black currant

Species of fruit and plant

Ribes hudsonianum is a North American species of currant, known by the common name northern black currant.

== Description ==
Ribes hudsonianum grows in moist wooded areas, such as mountain streambanks and in swamp thickets. They are upright to erect shrubs growing 0.5–2 metres (1 1/2–6 1/2 ft) tall. They are aromatic, with a strong scent generally considered unpleasant. The stems are covered in shiny, yellow resin glands that lack spines or prickles. The leaves are 2.5–12.5 centimetres (1–5 in) long, divided into five sharp-toothed lobes, the lower two smaller. There are long hairs on the undersides, studded with yellow glands.

The inflorescences are erect, spikelike racemes of up to 50 flowers. Each flower is roughly tubular, with the whitish sepals spreading open to reveal smaller whitish petals within. Fruits are bitter-tasting, black berries, about 1 cm (3/8 in) wide with a waxy surface, speckled with yellow glands.

== Taxonomy ==
The species is divided into two varieties, each known simultaneously as northern black currants, and by their own individual common, and scientific names; the type variety, R. h. var. hudsonianum, is also known as the Hudson Bay currant; whereas R. h. var. petiolare is also known as the western black currant.

== Habitat and distribution ==
The species can be found in rocky areas and in humid forests, from montane to subalpine areas. Both varieties are present only in British Columbia, Idaho and Washington.

Hudson Bay currants are found in every province in Canada from Quebec westward, and in parts of the United States (Alaska, the Great Lakes region, the northern Rockies, Cascades, Blue Mountains, and other parts of the Northwest).

Western black currants are found in British Columbia, but are distributed primarily in the western U.S. (Wyoming, Montana, Idaho, Washington, Oregon, northern Nevada, northern California, and Utah).

== Uses ==
The berries are bitter but edible. The Nlaka'pamux use the presence of black currants around a lake as evidence that there will likely be fish in the lake.
