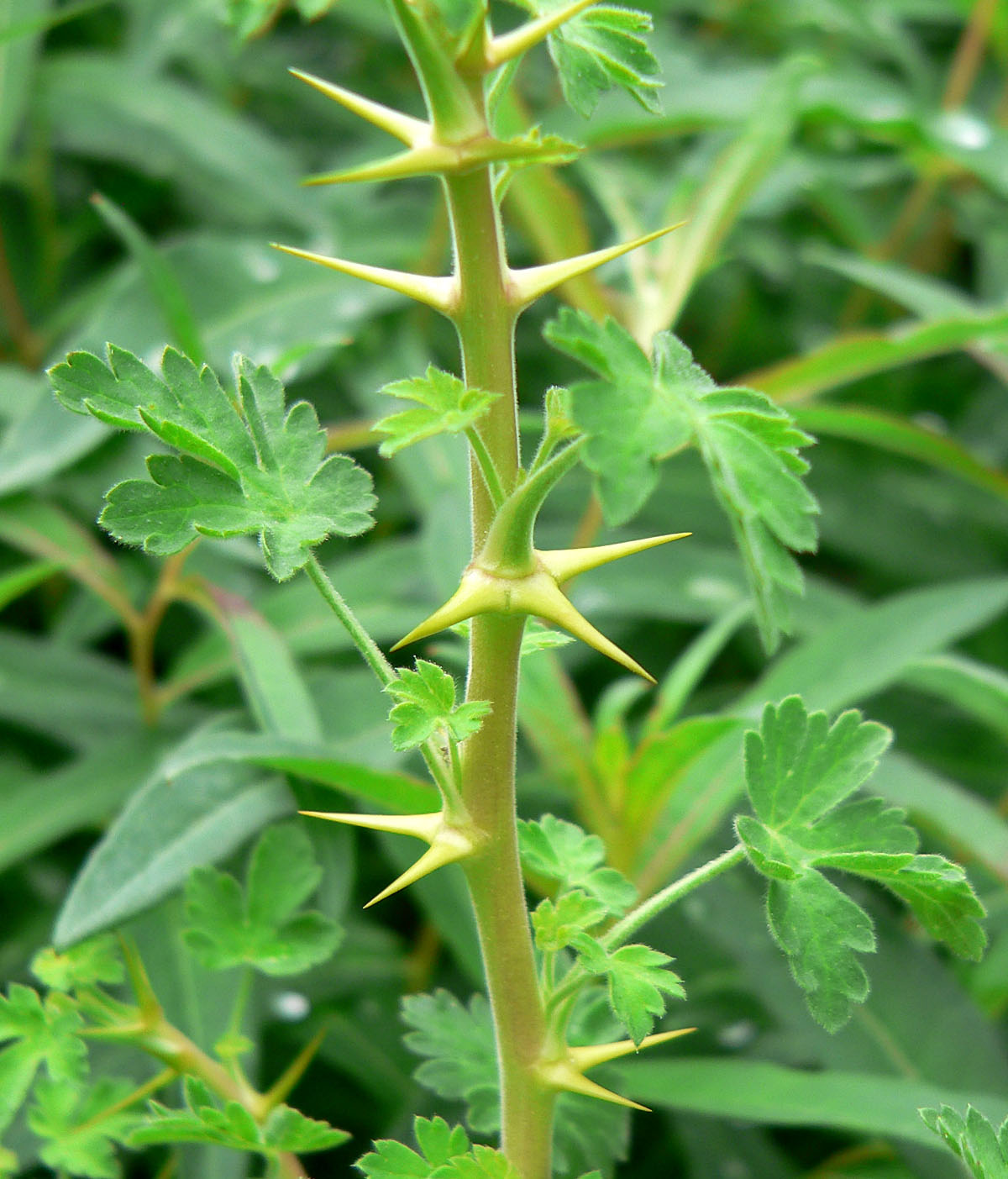
- R. montigenum, growing in an avalanche-disturbed area, in the Spring Mountains, southern Nevada

Conservation status
- Apparently Secure (NatureServe)

Scientific classification
- Kingdom: Plantae
- Clade: Tracheophytes
- Clade: Angiosperms
- Clade: Eudicots
- Order: Saxifragales
- Family: Grossulariaceae
- Genus: Ribes
- Species: R. montigenum

Binomial name
- Ribes montigenum McClatchie

Synonyms
- List: Limnobotrya montigena Rydb. (1917); Ribes lacustre var. molle A.Gray (1876); Ribes lentum Coville & Rose (1902); Ribes molle Howell (1898); Ribes nubigenum McClatchie (1894)

= Ribes montigenum =

Mountain gooseberry

Western North American currant species

Ribes montigenum is a North American species of currant known by the common names mountain gooseberry, alpine prickly currant, western prickly gooseberry, and gooseberry currant.

== Description ==
It is a spreading shrub growing to 0.3–1.5 meters (1–5 ft) tall, the branching stems covered in prickles and hairs, and bearing 1 to 5 sharp spines at intervals.

Borne on a petiole several centimetres in length, the lightly hairy, glandular leaves are up to 4 cm (1 1/2 in) long and are divided into about five deeply cut, bluntly toothed lobes. The inflorescence is a raceme of several flowers. Each flower has five sepals in shades of yellow-green or pale pink, orange, or yellow which spread into a corolla-like star. At the center are five smaller club-shaped red petals and purple-red stamens tipped with yellowish or cream anthers. The fruit is an acidic but palatable red to orange-red edible berry up to 1 cm long; it is usually covered in soft bristles. The dried flower remnant at the end is small compared to that of wax currant.

== Distribution and habitat ==
It is native to western North America from Washington south to California and east as far as the Rocky Mountains, where it grows in high mountain habitat types in subalpine and alpine climates, such as forests and talus.

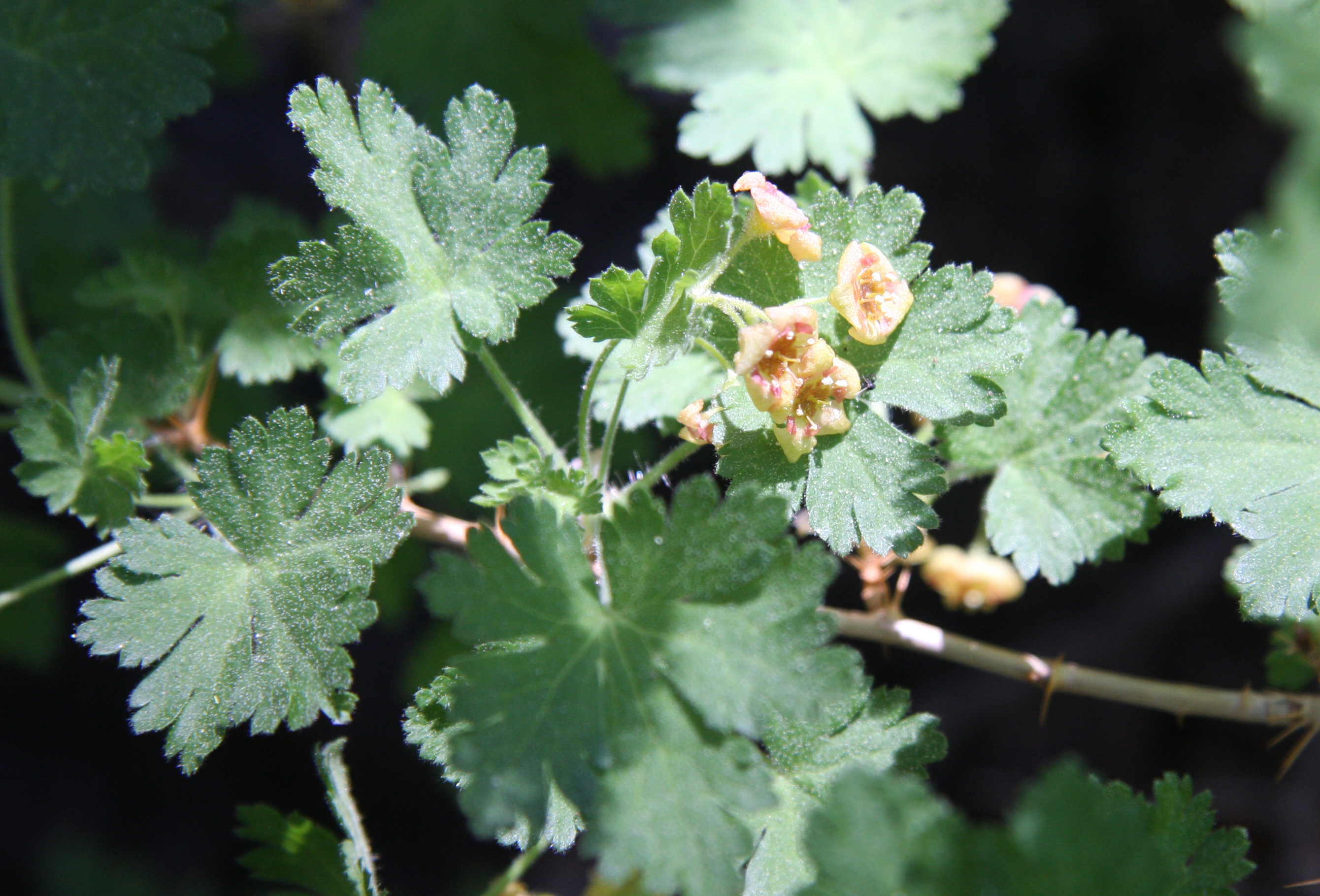
Foliage

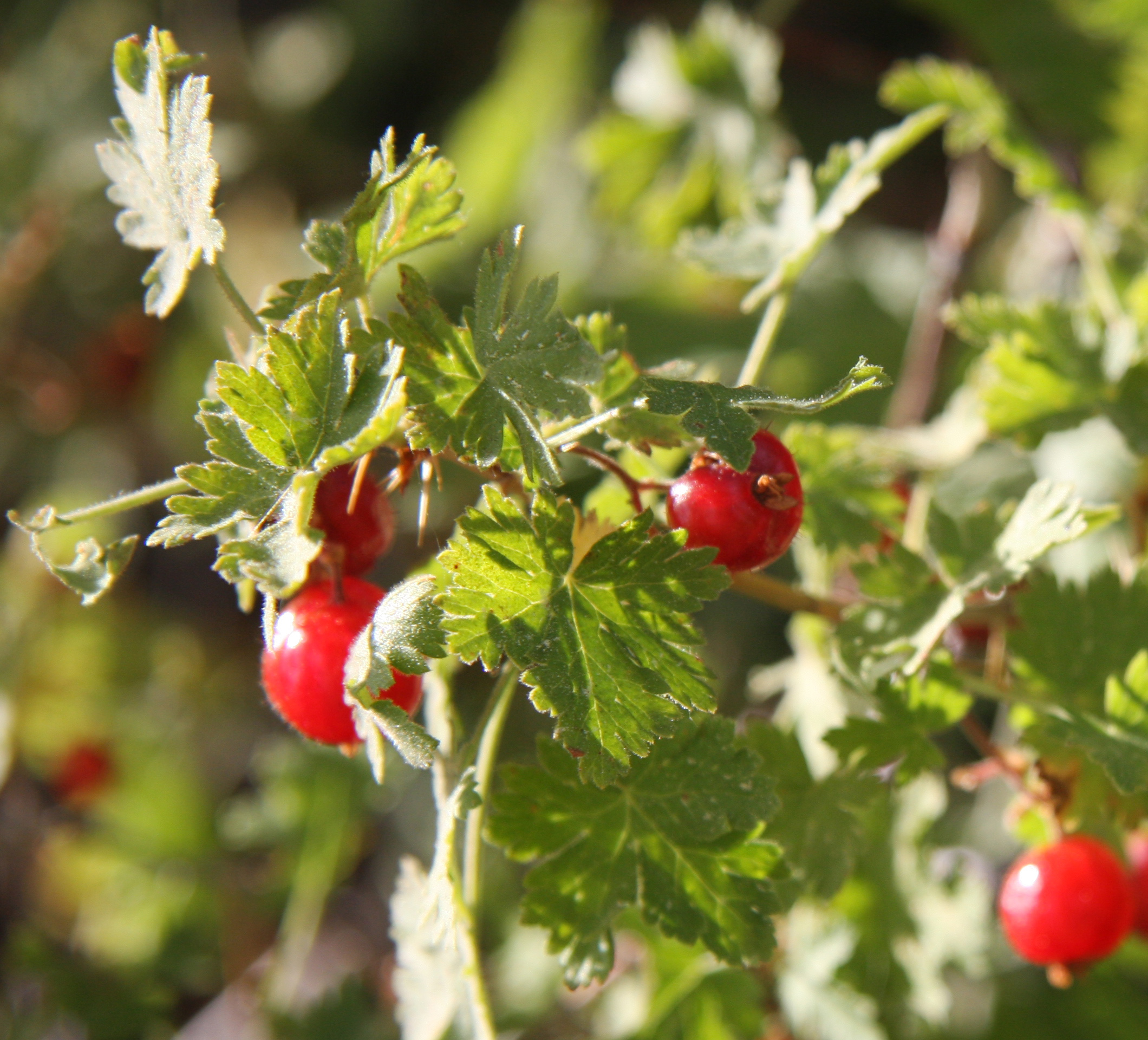
Berries
