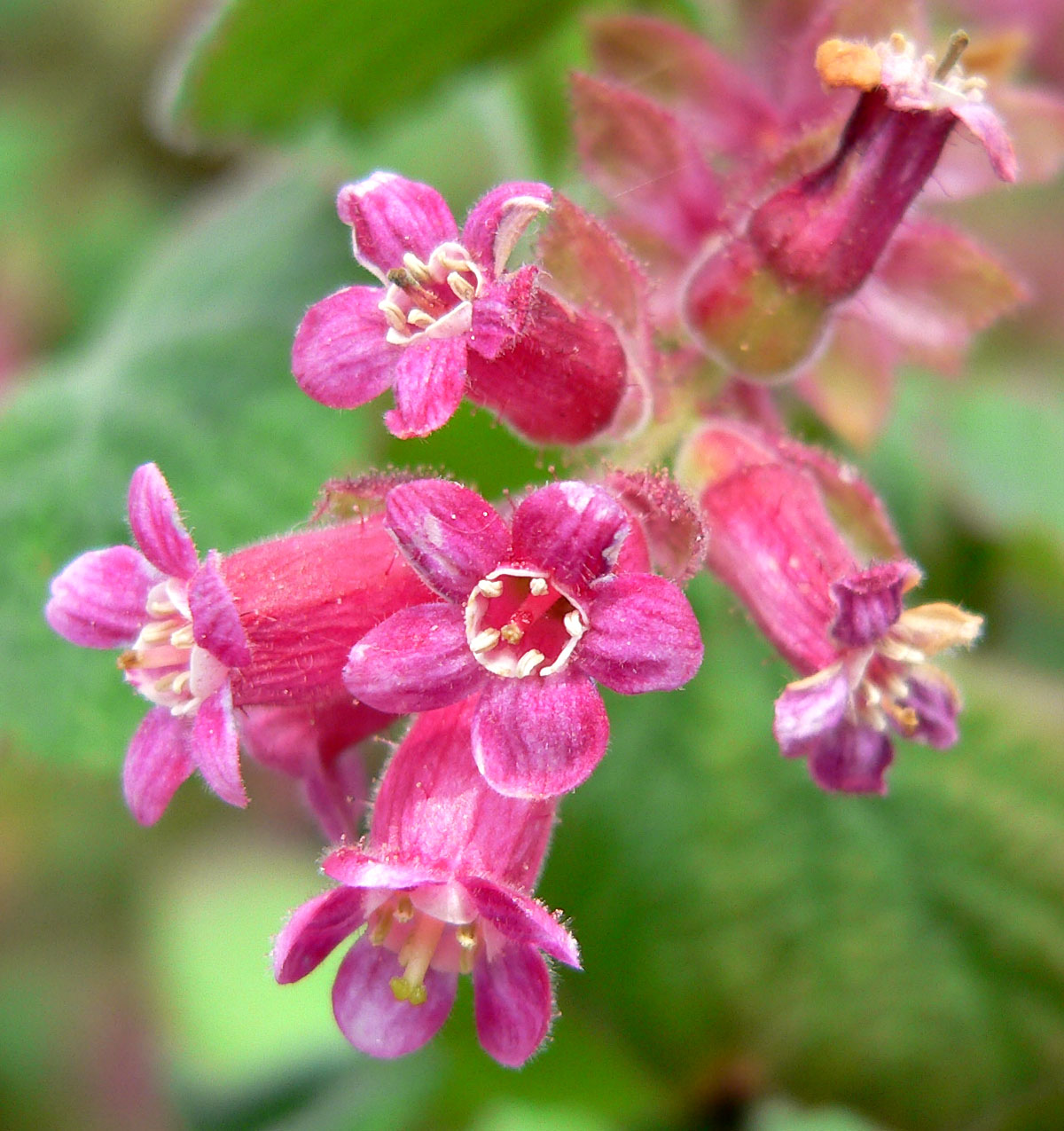

Scientific classification
- Kingdom: Plantae
- Clade: Tracheophytes
- Clade: Angiosperms
- Clade: Eudicots
- Order: Saxifragales
- Family: Grossulariaceae
- Genus: Ribes
- Species: R. malvaceum

Binomial name
- Ribes malvaceum Sm.

Synonyms
- Ribes purpurascens A.Heller

= Ribes malvaceum =

Species of shrub

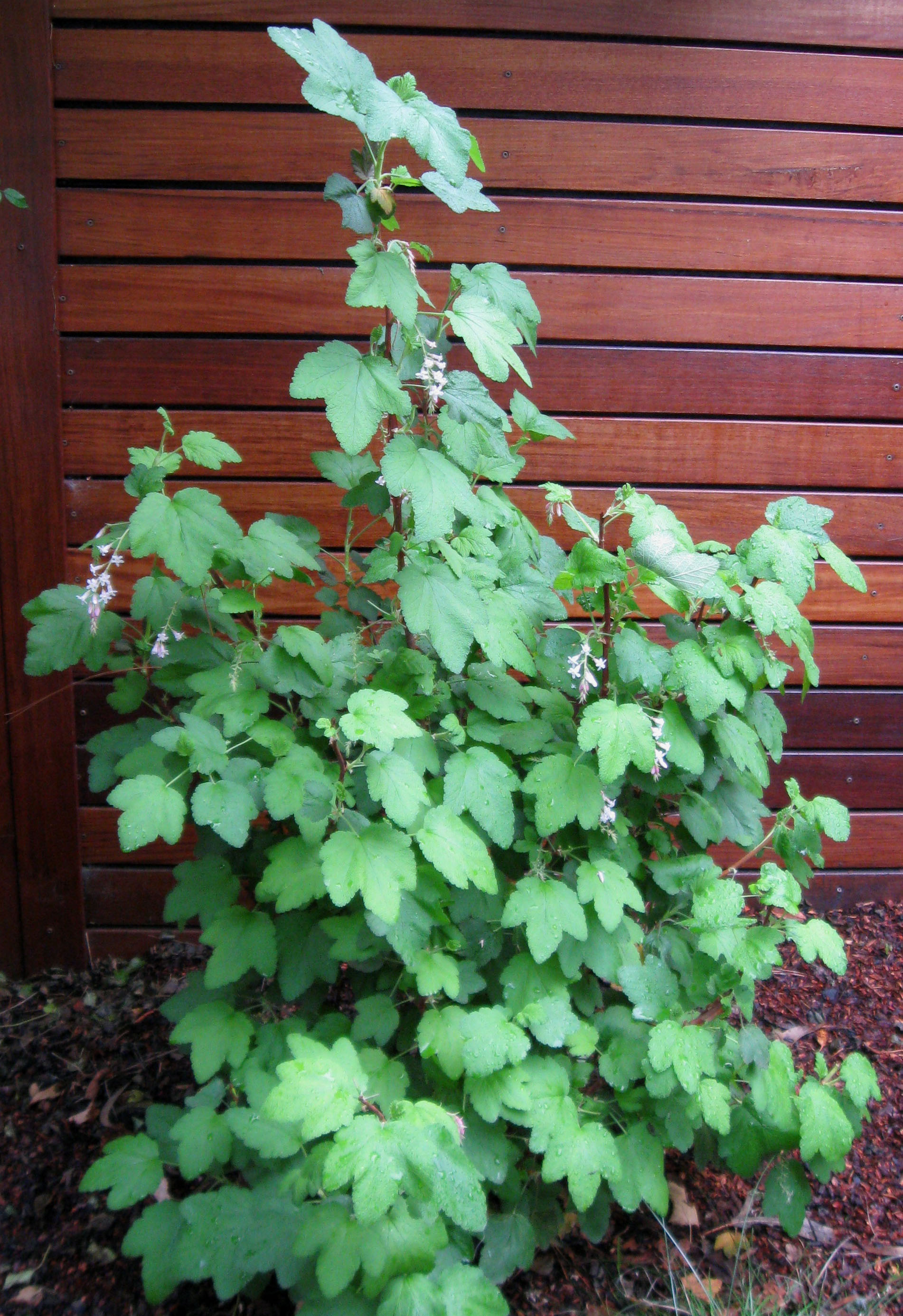
Ribes malvaceum in garden setting.

Ribes malvaceum, the chaparral currant, is a gooseberry species native to the Californias.

== Description ==
Ribes malvaceum is a perennial shrub that typically grows to 1.5–3 metres (5–10 ft) tall. It lacks the characteristic nodal spines which are demonstrated on the stems of many other members in the genus. The leaf blades are 2–5 centimetres (3/4–2 in) across, 3–5-lobed, glandular-hairy, and toothed.

Inflorescences are 10–25 flowered and open, occurring October to April in native range. The hypanthium is pink, 5–8 millimetres (1/4–3/8 in), and about twice as long as wide. The sepals are pink-purple in color and 4–6 mm. Petals are 2–3 mm and can range in color from pink shades to white. The flower also contains two fused styles which are fused to the tip and have a hairy base.

Striking glaucous purple berries are produced. The fruit is 6–7 mm, glandular and covered by white hairs, with a bland but palatable taste.

== Varieties ==
There are several varieties of R. malvaceum:

- Ribes malvaceum var. clementinum — (Dunkle)
- Ribes malvaceum var. malvaceum — plants with dark green leaves occurring below 800 m (2,600 ft).
- Ribes malvaceum var. viridifolium — (Abrams) — plants with bright green leaves occurring up to 1,500 m (4,900 ft)

== Distribution and habitat ==
It is native to California and northern Baja California, where it occurs from sea level to 1,500 m (4,900 ft), in chaparral, foothill oak woodland, and closed-cone pine forest habitats.

== Ecology ==
Pollination ecologists have reported the plant important as a honey plant for attracting large numbers of native bees.

== Cultivation ==
Ribes malvaceum is cultivated as an ornamental plant by specialty plant nurseries. It is used in traditional gardens, native plant landscapes, and as bird food source in habitat gardens. It thrives under oaks in bright dry conditions, and in many other locations.
