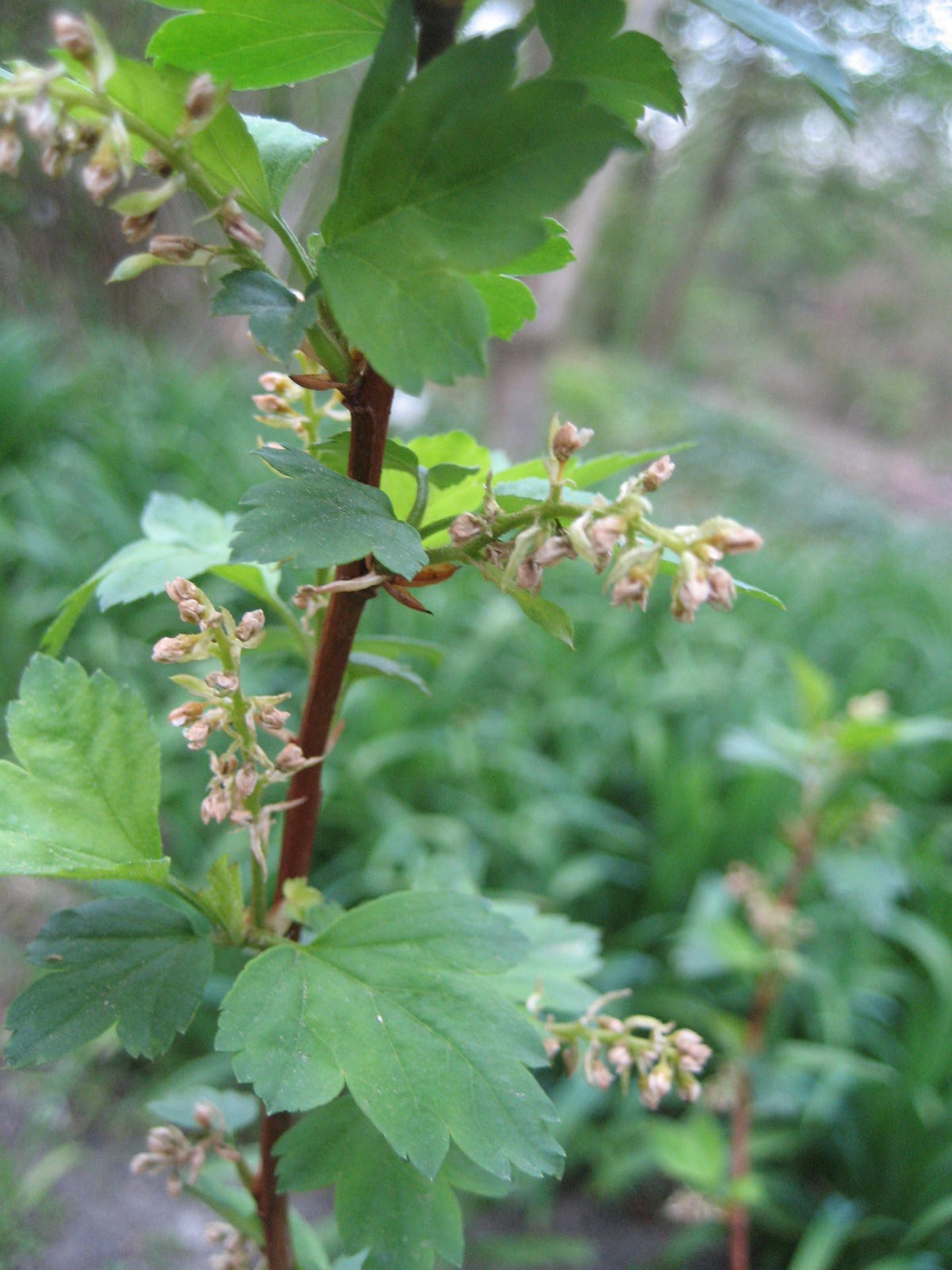

Scientific classification
- Kingdom: Plantae
- Clade: Tracheophytes
- Clade: Angiosperms
- Clade: Eudicots
- Order: Saxifragales
- Family: Grossulariaceae
- Genus: Ribes
- Species: R. maximowiczii

Binomial name
- Ribes maximowiczii Batalin

Synonyms
- Ribes distans Janczewski; Ribes tricuspe Nakai.; Ribes pachyadenium Hand.-Mazz.

= Ribes maximowiczii =

Species of currant

Ribes maximowiczii is a species of Ribes found in China, Japan, Korea, and Russia at elevations of 900–2700 meters. It is a dioecious shrub.
