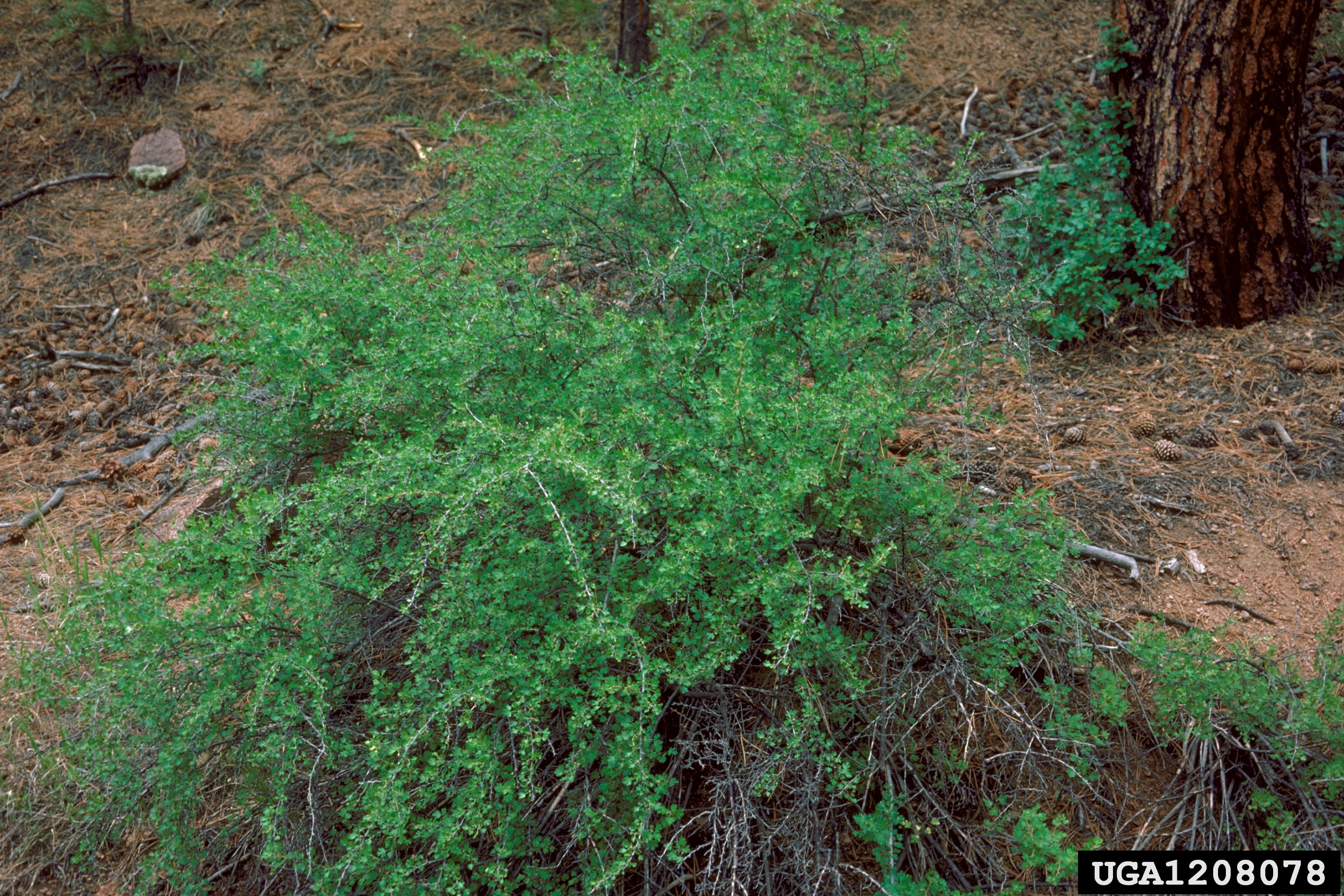

Conservation status
- Secure (NatureServe)

Scientific classification
- Kingdom: Plantae
- Clade: Tracheophytes
- Clade: Angiosperms
- Clade: Eudicots
- Order: Saxifragales
- Family: Grossulariaceae
- Genus: Ribes
- Species: R. inerme

Binomial name
- Ribes inerme Rydb. 1900

Varieties
- Ribes inerme var. klamathense (Coville) Jeps.

Synonyms
- Ribes divaricatum var. inerme (Rydb.) McMinn; Ribes hirtellum var. inerme (Rydb.) Smiley; Grossularia inermis (Rydb.) Coville & Britton; Ribes purpusii Koehne ex Blank.

= Ribes inerme =

Species of flowering plant

Ribes inerme is a species of currant known by the common names whitestem gooseberry and white stemmed gooseberry. It is native to western North America.

== Description ==
Ribes inerme is an erect or spreading thicketlike shrub approaching 3 metres (10 ft) in maximum height. The stem is hairless or bristly and has black resin glands and spines at its nodes. The leaves are 2.5–7.5 centimetres (1–3 in) wide, divided deeply into three to five toothed lobes which may be divided partway into smaller lobes.

The inflorescence is a solitary flower or raceme of up to five flowers which hangs pendent. The flower has five reddish green sepals which are reflexed upward. At the center are white or pinkish petals and protruding stamens and stigmas.

The fruit is an edible hairless greenish, purple, or black berry roughly 1 cm (3/8 in) wide.

=== Varieties ===
- Ribes inerme var. inerme
- Ribes inerme var. klamathense – Klamath gooseberry

== Distribution and habitat ==
It is native to western North America from British Columbia to California and eastward to the Rocky Mountains. It grows in mountain forests, woodlands, and meadows.

The less common Ribes inerme var. klamathense, known as Klamath gooseberry, is confined to the states of California and Oregon.
