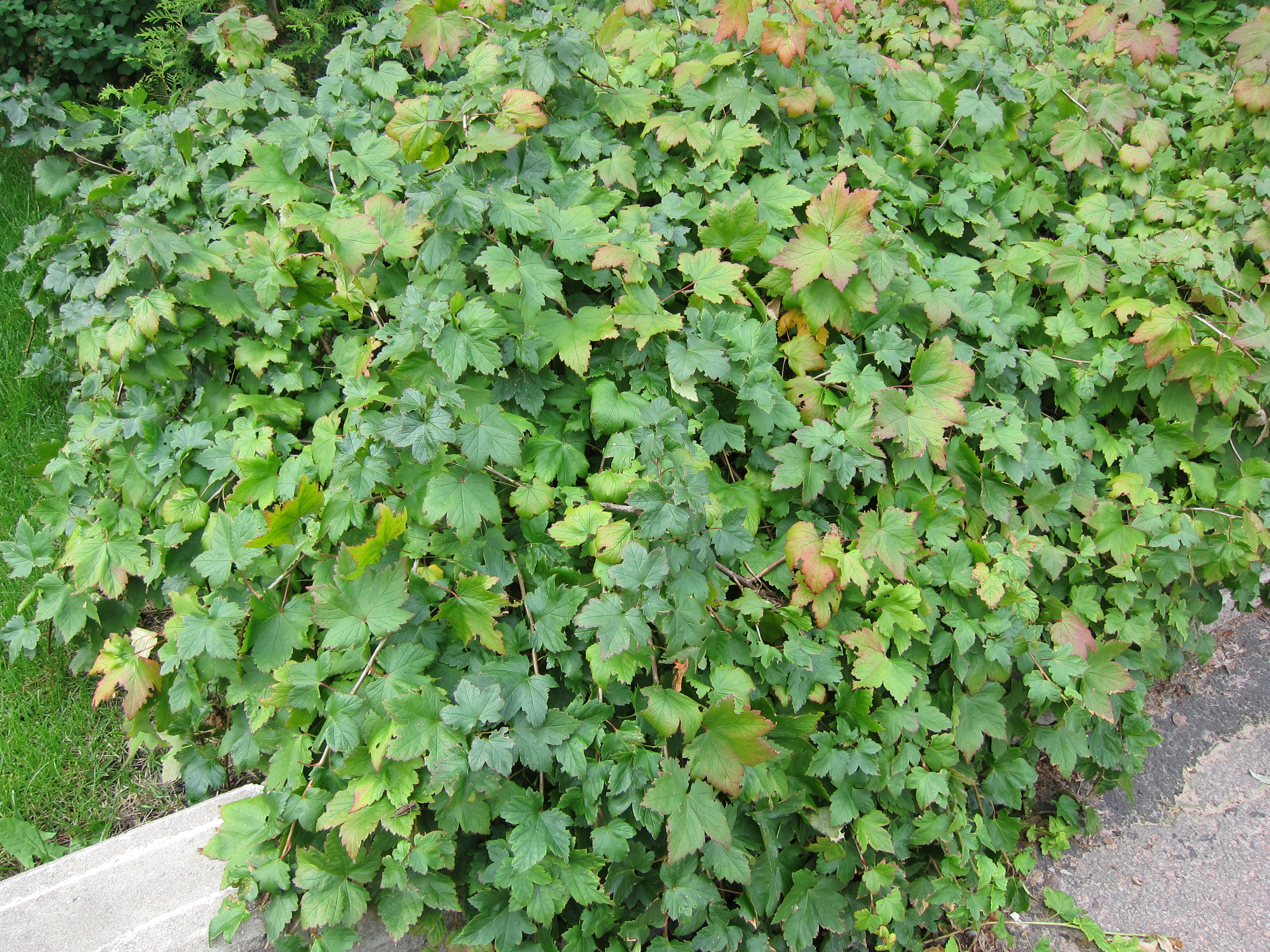

Conservation status
- Least Concern (IUCN 3.1)

Scientific classification
- Kingdom: Plantae
- Clade: Tracheophytes
- Clade: Angiosperms
- Clade: Eudicots
- Order: Saxifragales
- Family: Grossulariaceae
- Genus: Ribes
- Species: R. glandulosum

Binomial name
- Ribes glandulosum Grauer 1784 not Ruiz & Pav. 1802

= Ribes glandulosum =

Species of fruit and plant

Ribes glandulosum, or the skunk currant, is a North American species of flowering plant in the currant family.

== Description ==
Ribes glandulosum is a deciduous shrub growing to 0.5 metres (2 ft) tall and wide. The leaves are 2.5–7.5 centimetres (1–3 in) wide, palmately lobed with 5–7 deeply cut segments. Flowers are in elongated clusters of 6–15 pink flowers. Fruits are dark red and egg-shaped, sometimes palatable but sometimes not.

== Distribution and habitat ==
It is widespread in Canada (all 10 provinces and all 3 territories) and is also found in parts of the United States (Alaska, the Great Lakes region, the Appalachian Mountains, and the Northeast). It can be found in humid forests, shrub thickets, clearings, and on rocky slopes.

== As a noxious weed ==
It is considered a noxious weed in Michigan, and planting it is prohibited in certain parts of the state.

== Conservation ==
Ribes glandulosum has been assessed as least concern on the IUCN Red List. It is listed as endangered in Connecticut and New Jersey, and presumed extirpated in Ohio.

== Uses ==
The Ojibwe people take a compound decoction of the root for back pain and for "female weakness". The Woods Cree use a decoction of the stem, either by itself or mixed with wild red raspberry, to prevent clotting after birth, eat the berries as food, and use the stem to make a bitter tea. The Algonquin people use the berries as food.
