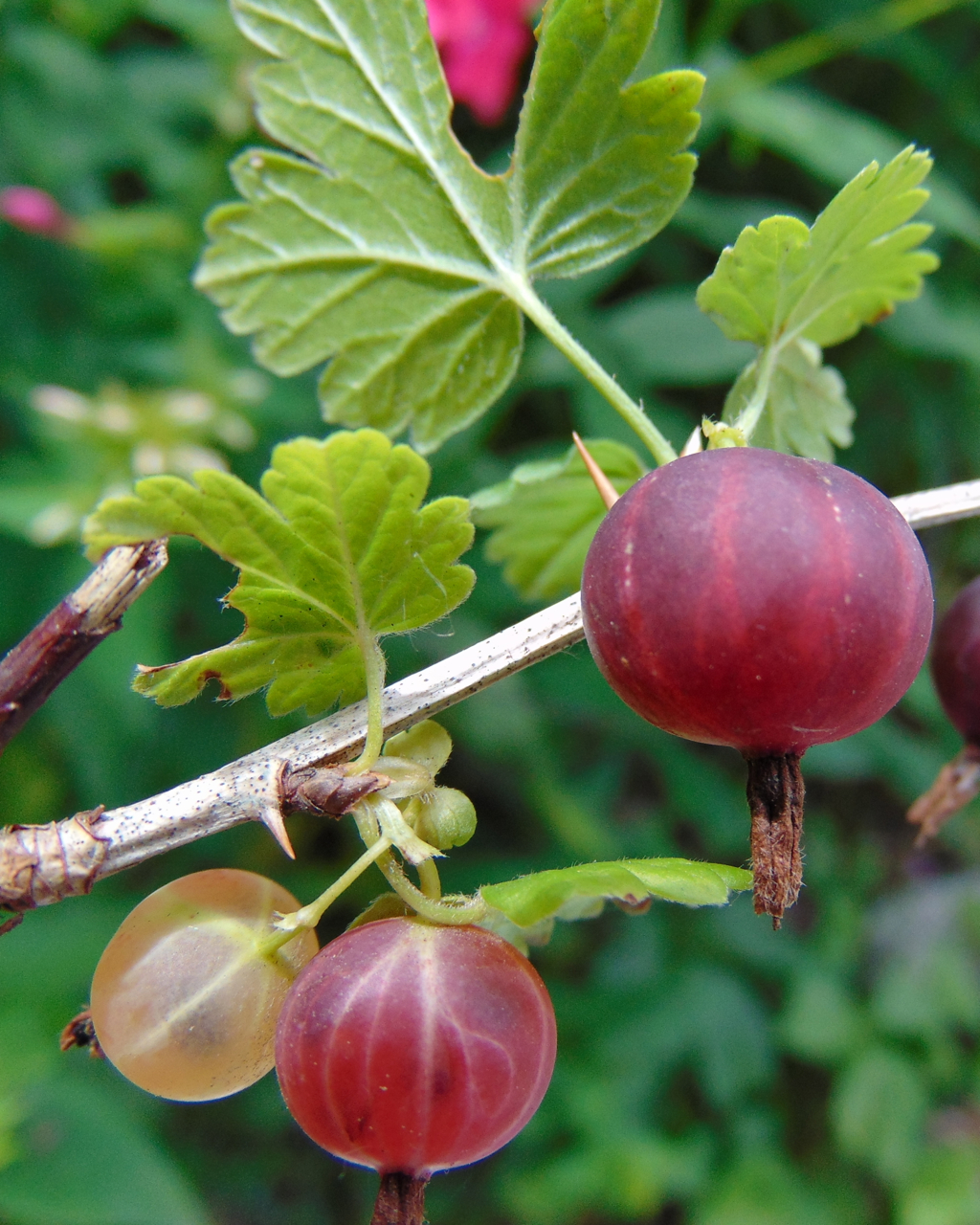

Scientific classification
- Kingdom: Plantae
- Clade: Tracheophytes
- Clade: Angiosperms
- Clade: Eudicots
- Order: Saxifragales
- Family: Grossulariaceae
- Genus: Ribes
- Species: R. hirtellum

Binomial name
- Ribes hirtellum Michx. 1803

Synonyms
- Grossularia hirtella (Michx.) Spach; Grossularia hirtella var. calcicola (Fernald) A. Berger; Ribes oxyacanthoides var. hirtellum (Michx.) Scoggan; Ribes oxyacanthoides var. calcicola Fernald

= Ribes hirtellum =

Species of flowering plant

Ribes hirtellum is a species of gooseberry commonly known as wild gooseberry or swamp gooseberry. It is native to Canada and the northern United States. Cultivated gooseberries are derived from this species and from Ribes uva-crispa.

Ribes hirtellum is known by several other names, including American gooseberry, hairy-stem gooseberry, hairy gooseberry, low wild gooseberry northern gooseberry, smooth gooseberry, and wedge-leaf gooseberry.

== Distribution and habitat ==
Ribes hirtellum grows in a variety of habitats, including wetlands such as fens, sedge meadows, riverbottom forests, and swamps, shorelines of streams and lakes, and rocky openings in forests and along cliffs. It grows throughout much of eastern north America, from Alberta to Nova Scotia in Canada, south to West Virginia, and west to Nebraska in the United States.

== Use in gooseberry breeding ==
Whereas Ribes uva-crispa crops have been devastated by American gooseberry mildew, Podosphaera mors-uvae, which was accidentally introduced to Europe, Ribes hirtellum is resistant. It is one of four American species that have been interbred with R. uva-crispa to produce resistant cultivars similar to the original R. uva-crispa cultivars. The cultivar 'Houghton' is one of those obtained by crossing R. uva-crispa with R. hirtellum.

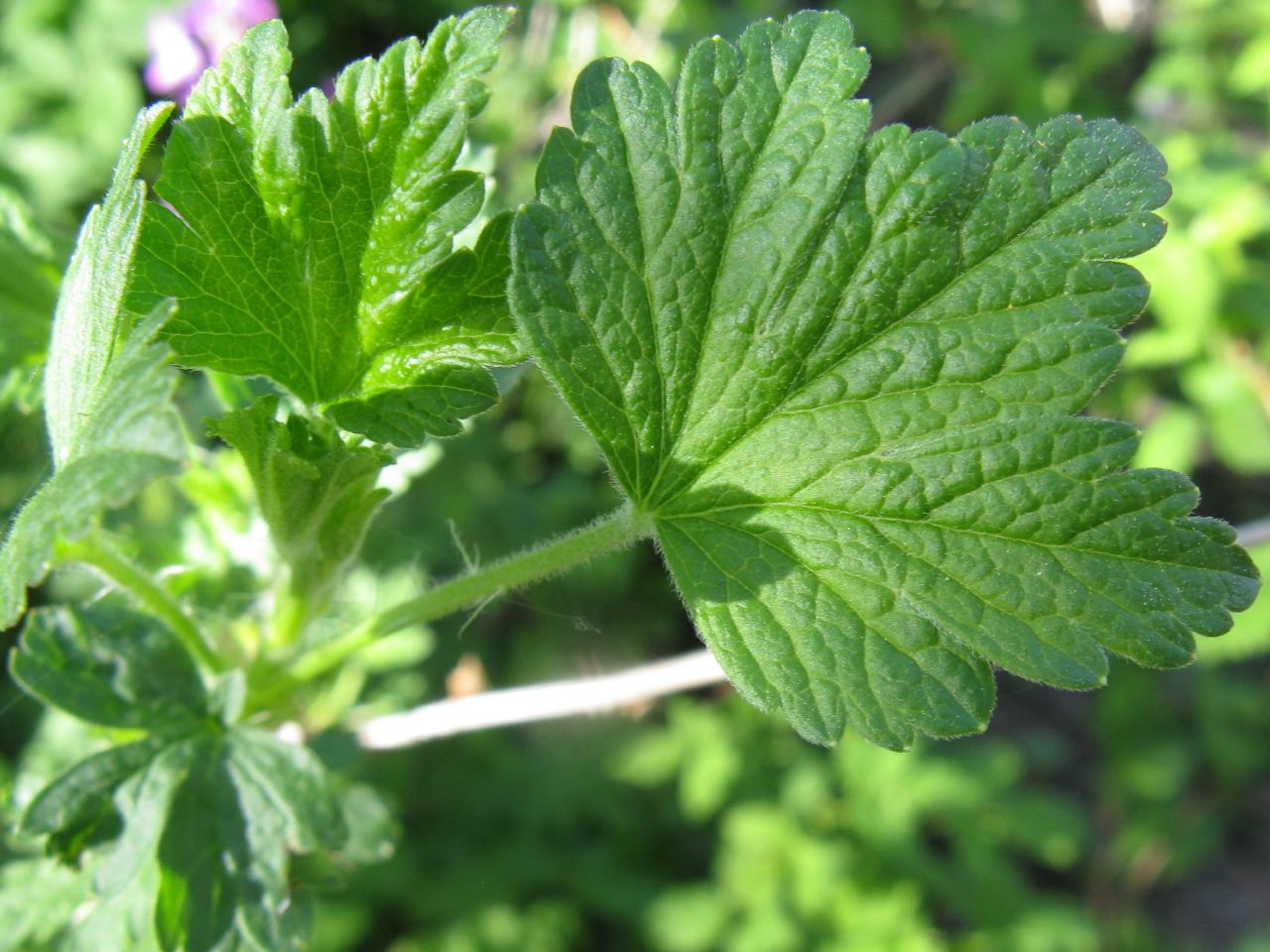
Leaf

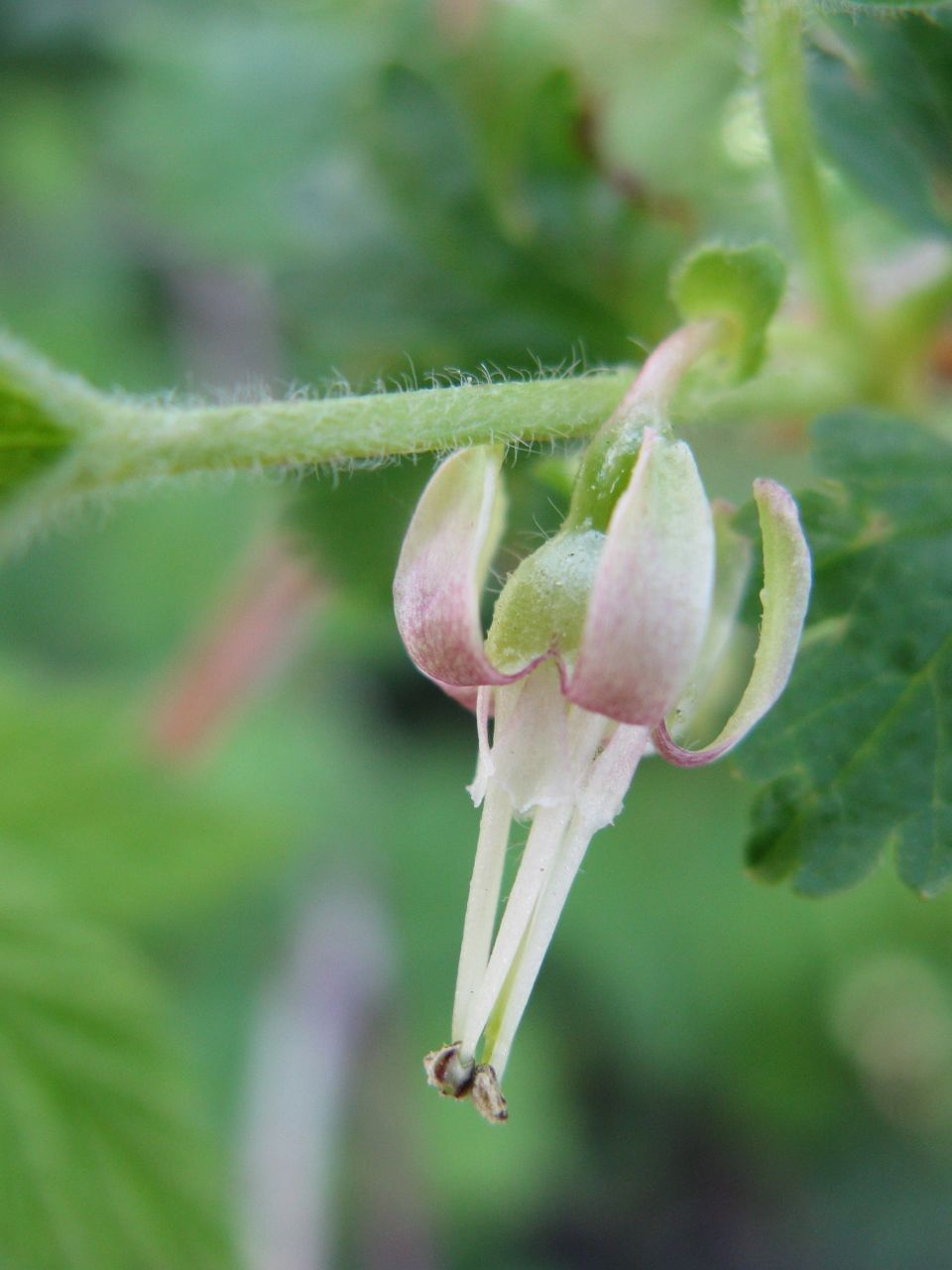
Flower

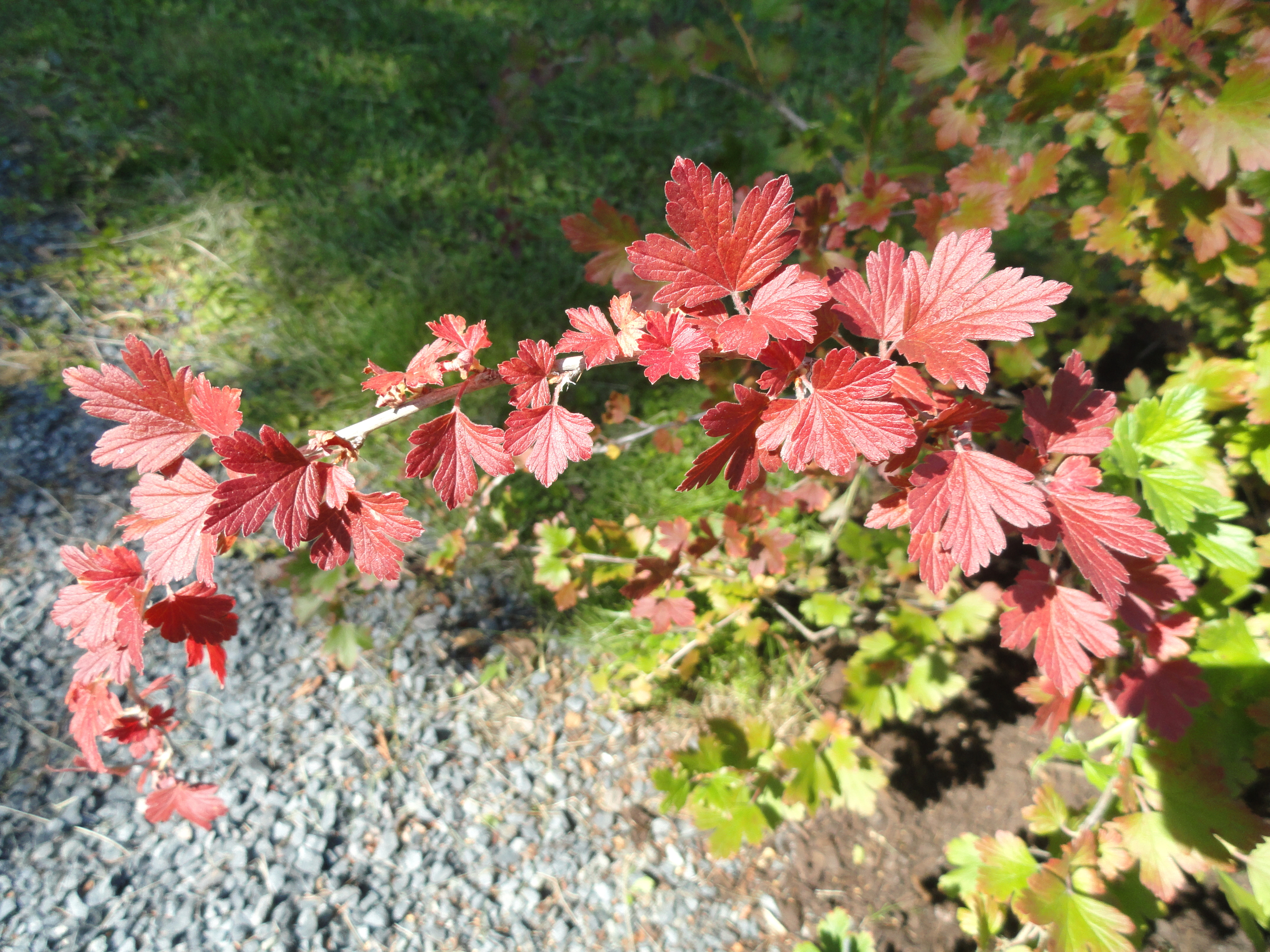
Autumn foliage
