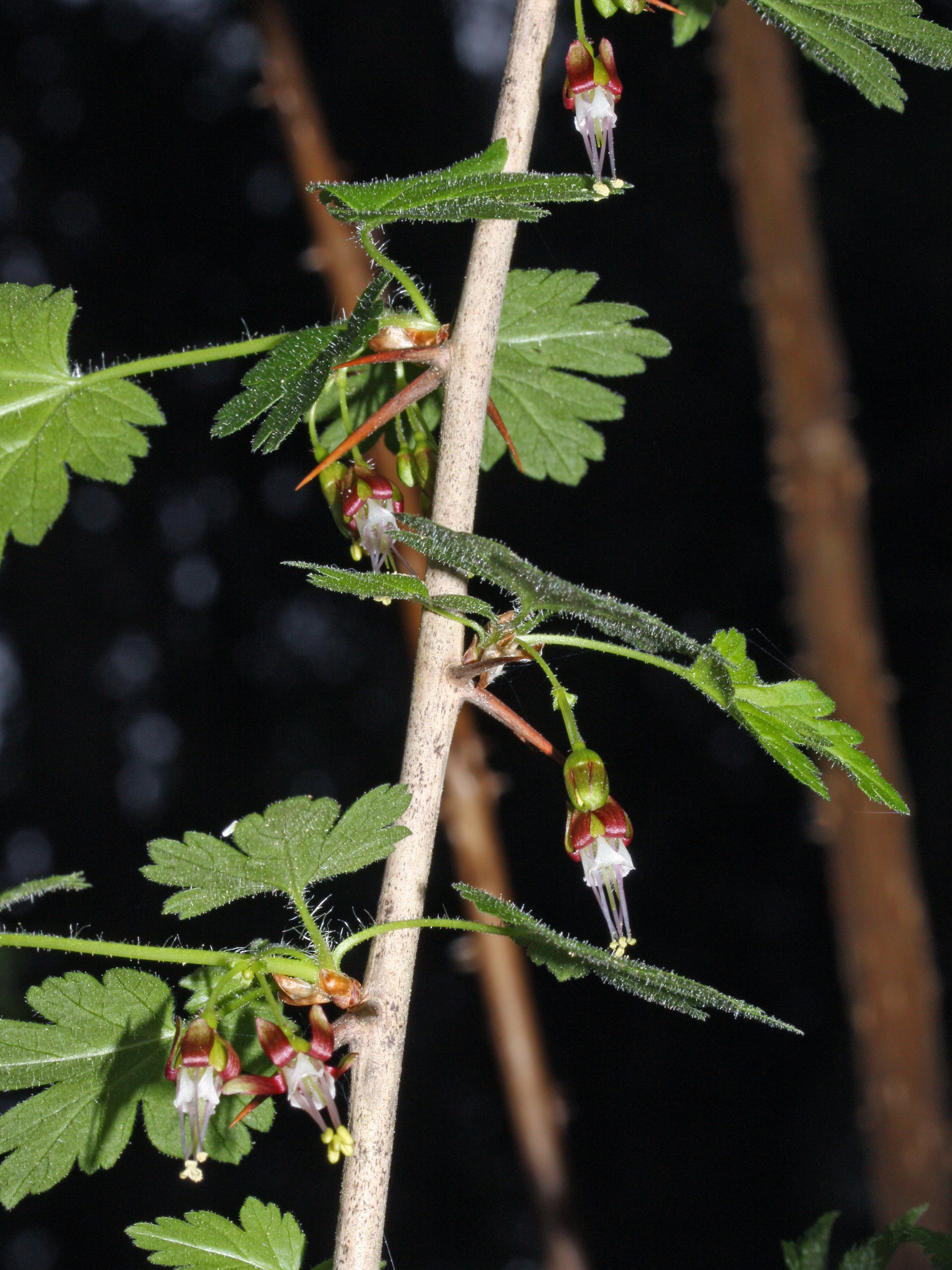
- Ribes divaricatum (spreading gooseberry)

Scientific classification
- Kingdom: Plantae
- Clade: Tracheophytes
- Clade: Angiosperms
- Clade: Eudicots
- Order: Saxifragales
- Family: Grossulariaceae; DC.
- Genus: Ribes; L.

Type species
- Ribes rubrum L.

Diversity
- About 200 species
- Distribution of Ribes species

Synonyms
- Grossularia Miller; Ribesium Medikus

= Ribes =

Genus of flowering plants

Ribes (/ˈraɪbiːz/ RY-beez) is a genus of approximately 200 known species of flowering plants, predominantly native to the temperate regions of the Northern Hemisphere. Ribes is the sole genus in the plant family Grossulariaceae. The genus includes species commonly referred to as redcurrants, blackcurrants, whitecurrants, and gooseberries. Several species are cultivated both for their edible fruit and as ornamental plants in horticulture. Ribes are the main alternate host for white pine blister rust, a fungal pathogen impacting five-needle pines.

== Description ==
Ribes species are medium shrub-like plants with marked diversity in flowers and fruit. They have either palmately lobed or compound leaves, and some have thorns. Ribes flowers are bisexual and are borne on racemes. Flower color can range from green to yellow or red depending on the species. The sepals of the flowers are larger than the petals, and fuse into a tube of saucer shape. The ovary is inferior, maturing into a berry with many seeds.

== Taxonomy ==
Ribes is the single genus in the Saxifragales family Grossulariaceae. Although once included in the broader circumscription of Saxifragaceae sensu lato, it is now positioned as a sister group to Saxifragaceae sensu stricto.

=== Subdivision ===
First treated on a worldwide basis in 1907, the infrageneric classification has undergone many revisions, and even in the era of molecular phylogenetics there has been contradictory evidence. Although sometimes treated as two separate genera, Ribes and Grossularia (Berger 1924), the consensus has been to consider it as a single genus, divided into a number of subgenera, the main ones of which are subgenus Ribes (currants) and subgenus Grossularia (gooseberries), further subdivided into sections. Janczewski (1907) considered six subgenera and eleven sections. Berger's twelve subgenera based on two distinct genera (see Senters & Soltis (2003) Table 1) have subsequently been demoted to sections. Weigend (2007) elevated a number of sections to produce a taxonomy of seven subgenera; Ribes (sections Ribes, Heretiera, Berisia) Coreosma, Calobotrya (sections Calobotrya, Cerophyllum), Symphocalyx, Grossularioides, Grossularia, Parilla.

Taxonomy, according to Berger, modified by Sinnott (1985):

- Subgenus Ribes L. (currants) 8 sections
  - Section Berisia Spach (alpine currants)
  - Section Calobotrya (Spach) Jancz. (ornamental currants)
  - Section Coreosma (Spach) Jancz. (black currants)
  - Section Grossularioides ( Jancz.) Rehd. (spiny or Gooseberry-stemmed currants)
  - Section Heritiera Jancz. (dwarf or skunk currants)
  - Section Parilla Jancz. (Andine or South American currants)
  - Section Ribes L. (red currants)
  - Section Symphocalyx Berland. (golden currants)
- Subgenus Grossularia (Mill.) Pers. (Gooseberries) 4 sections
  - Section Grossularia (Mill.) Nutt.
  - Section Robsonia Berland.
  - Section Hesperia A.Berger
  - Section Lobbia A. Berger

Some authors continued to treat Hesperia and Lobbia as subgenera. Early molecular studies suggested that subgenus Grossularia was actually embedded within subgenus Ribes. Analysis of combined molecular datasets confirms subgenus Grossularia as a monophyletic group, with two main lineages, sect. Grossularia and another clade consisting of glabrous gooseberies, including Hesperia, Lobbia and Robsonia. Other monophyletic groups identified were Calobotrya, Parilla, Symphocalyx and Berisia. However, sections Ribes, Coreosma and Heritiera were not well supported. Consequently, there is insufficient resolution to justify further taxonomic revision.

=== Species ===
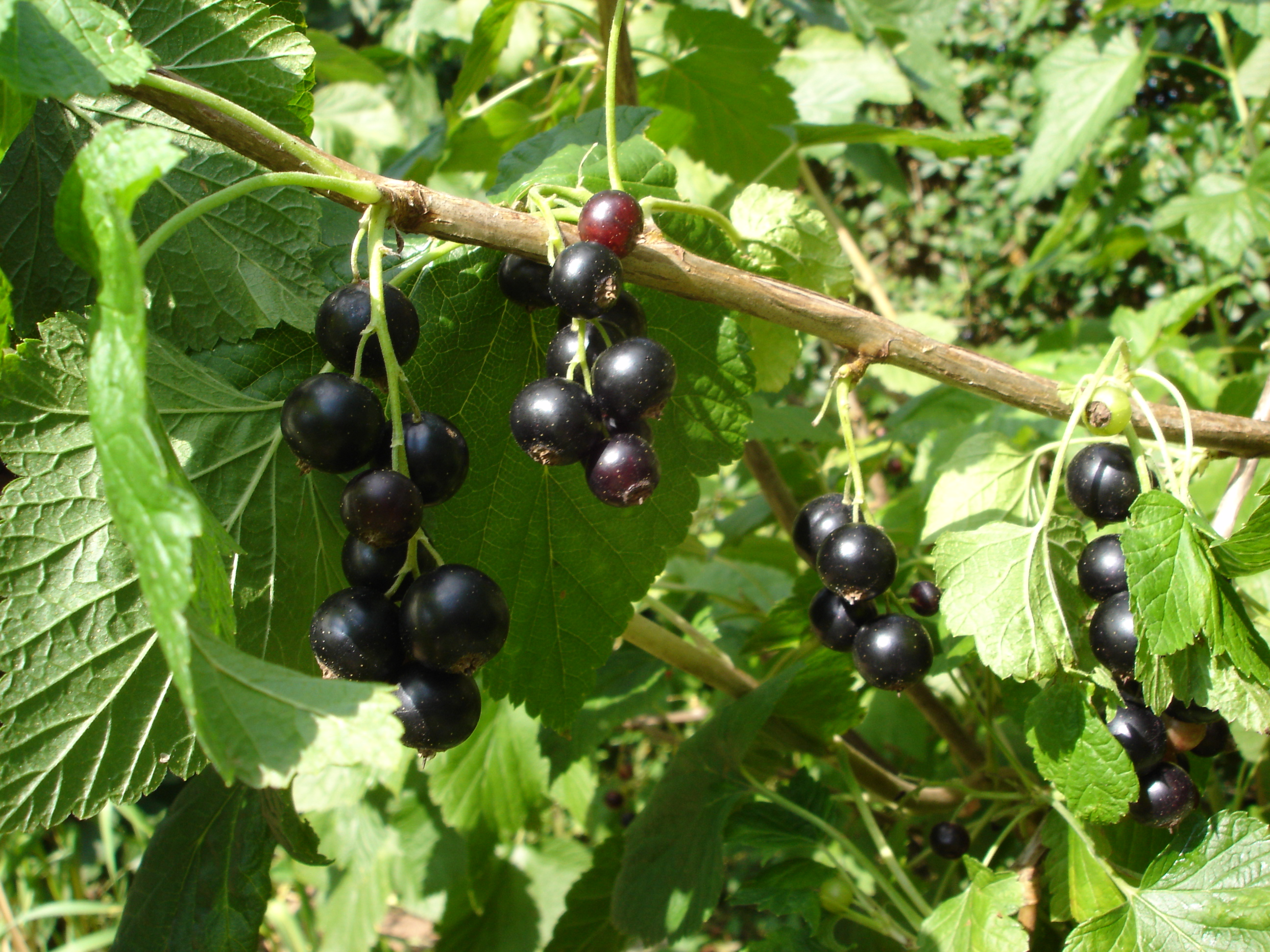
Blackcurrant (Ribes nigrum)

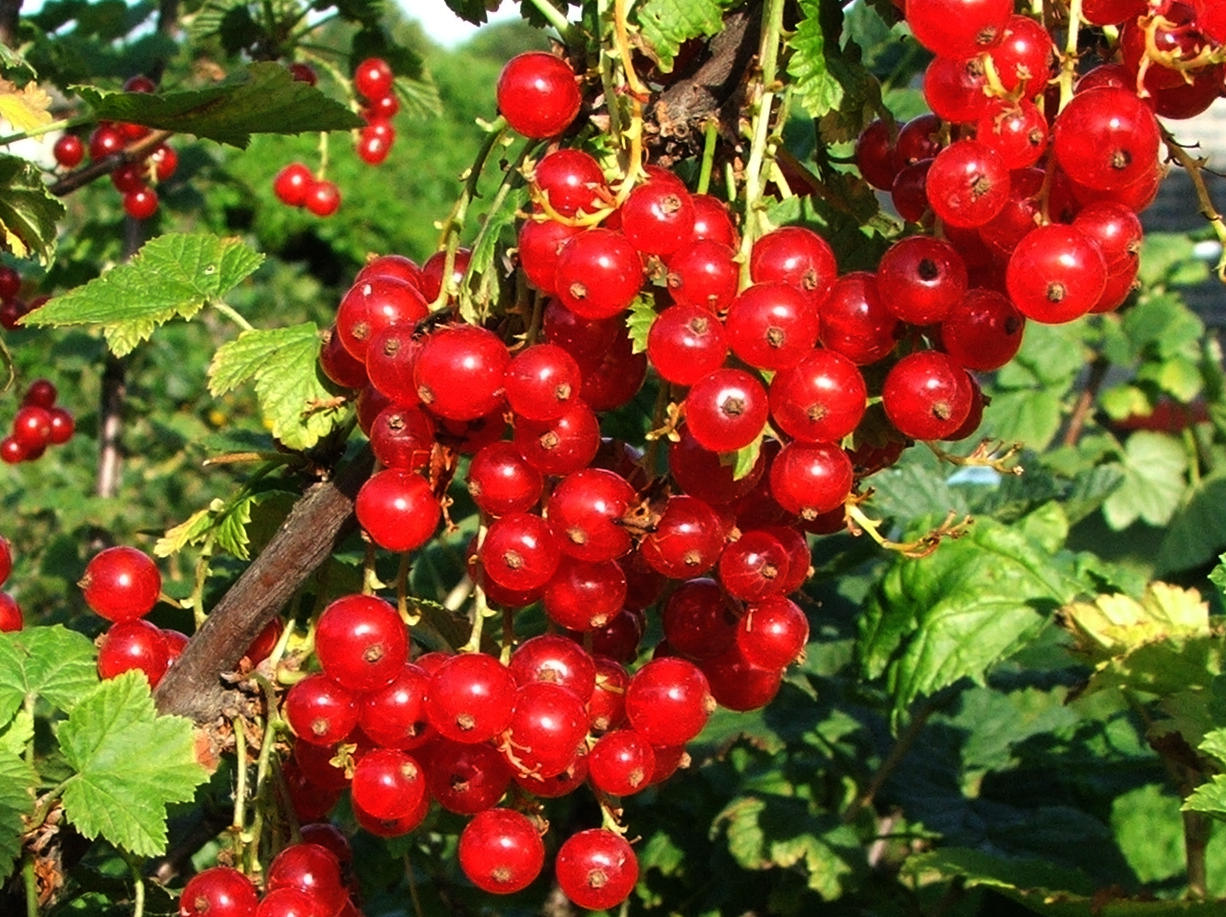
Redcurrant (Ribes rubrum)

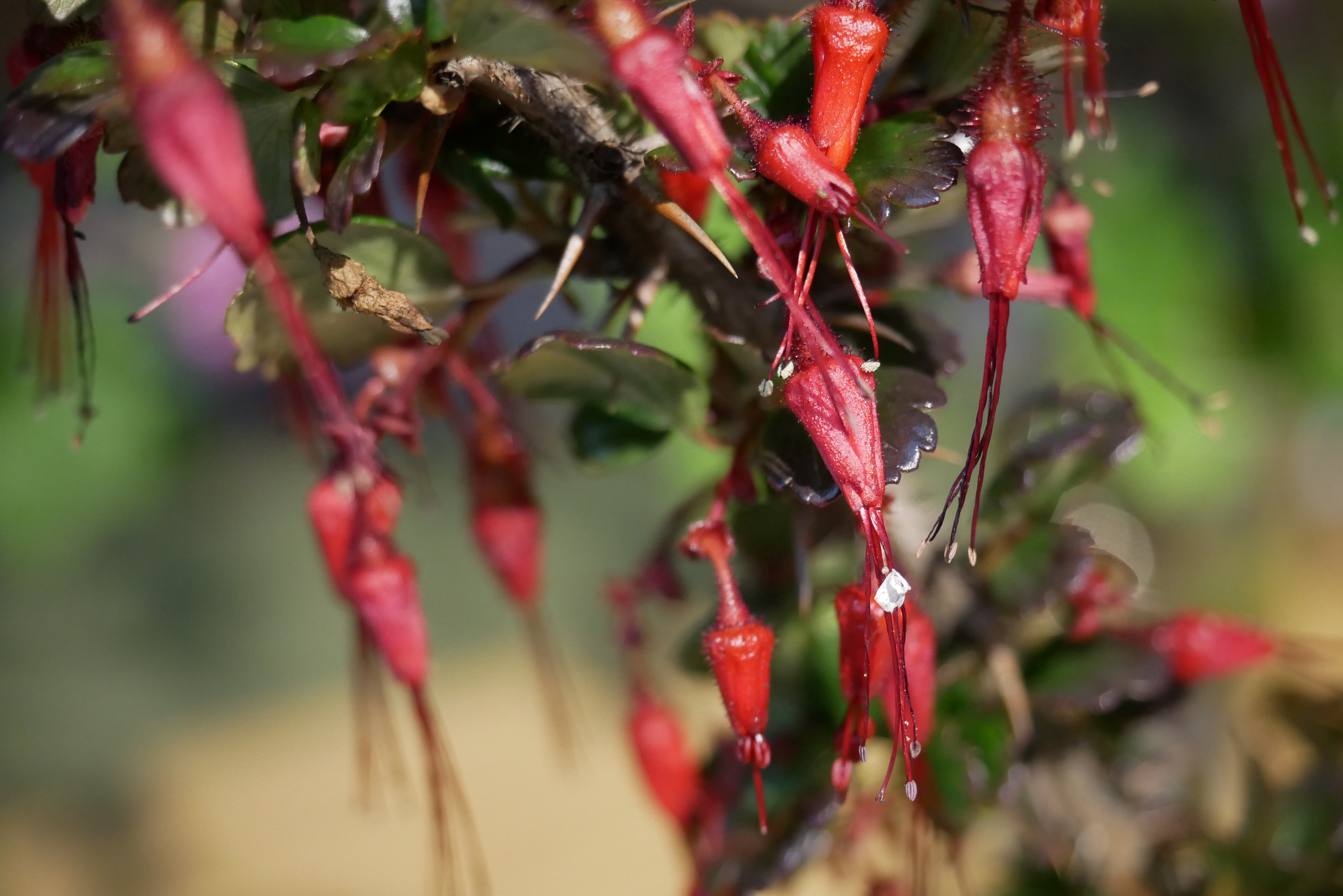
Ribes speciosum (fuchsia-flowered gooseberry)

There are around 200 species of Ribes. Selected species include:

- Ribes alpinum
- Ribes aureum
- Ribes cereum
- Ribes divaricatum
- Ribes glandulosum
- Ribes hirtellum
- Ribes hudsonianum
- Ribes inerme
- Ribes lacustre
- Ribes laurifolium
- Ribes lobbii
- Ribes montigenum
- Ribes maximowiczii
- Ribes nevadense
- Ribes nigrum
- Ribes oxyacanthoides
- Ribes rubrum
- Ribes sanguineum
- Ribes speciosum
- Ribes triste
- Ribes uva-crispa

== Distribution and habitat ==
Ribes is widely distributed through the Northern Hemisphere, and also extending south in the mountainous areas of South America. Species can be found in meadows or near streams.

== Ecology ==
The majority of Ribes species are insect pollinated. Exceptions include R. sanguineum, R. malvaceum, and R. speciosum, which are humming-bird pollinated. After the flowers are pollinated and the fruits have matured, Ribes seeds are dispersed by birds and mammals, including elk, deer, cattle, and grizzly bears.

Currants are used as a food source by the larvae of some Lepidoptera species. Buff-tip moth caterpillars have shown strong preferences for Ribes species as host plants, especially R. alpinum and R. uva-crispa. The larvae of the moth species Archips argyrospilus, Papaiema nebris, Itame ribearia, and Nematocampa limbata are also associated with Ribes herbivory. Specifically winter moths and currant clearwing moths are known pests of currant species within agricultural settings.

== Cultivation ==
The genus Ribes includes the edible currants: blackcurrant, redcurrant, and white currant, as well as the European gooseberry, Ribes uva-crispa, and several hybrid varieties. It should not be confused with the dried currants used in cakes and puddings, which are from the Zante currant, a small-fruited cultivar of the grape Vitis vinifera. Ribes gives its name to the popular blackcurrant cordial Ribena.

The genus also includes the group of ornamental plants collectively known as the flowering currants, for instance, R. sanguineum.

Production of currants

Currant yield

=== United States ===
There are restrictions on growing some Ribes species in some U.S. states, as they are the main alternate host for white pine blister rust.

Restrictions on cultivation of Ribes in the United States:
State	Restrictions
Connecticut	No longer restricted
Delaware	R. aureum and R. nigrum prohibited entirely. Shipment, transport, or propagation of all other Ribes species require a permit.
Maine	Planting or possession of R. nigrum prohibited statewide. All other Ribes species prohibited in certain counties and towns.
Maryland	No restrictions found; state agricultural extension service provides advice on currant and gooseberry culture.
Massachusetts	Transport of R. nigrum prohibited throughout the Commonwealth. Other species of Ribes require a permit, with the caveat that permits shall not issue for a list of municipalities that cover most of the Commonwealth.
Michigan	R. nigrum prohibited statewide. Other species of Ribes and Grossularia require a permit in the blister rust control area, which includes the entirety of the Upper Peninsula and the northern and western portions of the Lower Peninsula.
New Hampshire	All Ribes species prohibited without a permit. Permits are sometimes issued for rust-resistant cultivars.
New Jersey	Possession or transport of R. nigrum requires a permit statewide. Possession or movement of all Ribes and Grossularia species is prohibited in certain municipalities in Sussex, Passaic and Morris Counties. Grossularia and Ribes other than R. nigrum otherwise requires only compliance with general regulations on movement of nursery stock.
New York	All Ribes species are prohibited in nine counties of the Adirondack Mountains, and in many townships in the Adirondacks and Catskills. R. nigrum is prohibited throughout the state, except that cultivars known to be immune to Cronartium ribicola, the white pine blister rust, may be grown wherever other Ribes species are permitted.
North Carolina	All Ribes species prohibited. The North Carolina Forest Service maintains an active eradication program for Ribes in the western part of the state.
Ohio	Possession, transport, planting, propagation, sale or offering for sale of R. nigrum is prohibited. Cultivars known to be immune to Cronartium ribicola, the white pine blister rust, are exempt. The law does not prohibit other Ribes species.
Pennsylvania	PennState Extension states: "In 1933, Pennsylvania passed a law that limited growing gooseberries and currants in certain areas; however, the law is not enforced. Therefore, all Ribes can be grown in the state."
Rhode Island	R. nigrum, R. aureum, and R. odoratum are prohibited throughout the state. Other Ribes species require permits to transport or plant and are forbidden in some municipalities, or within 900 feet of a stand of five-leaved pines one acre or more in extent or a nursery cultivating five-leaved pines.
Vermont	New England Small Fruit Management Guide asserts that there are "No regulations at present."
Virginia	R. nigrum plants may not be moved to any destination in Virginia.
West Virginia	R. nigrum plants may not be moved to any destination in West Virginia. Other Ribes species are prohibited in 23 counties.

== White pine blister rust ==
Ribes species are a telial stage host for the white pine blister rust fungus Cronartium ribicola. Infected Ribes individuals display yellow spotting on their leaves that appear orange and raised on the abaxial leaf surface. Severely infected plants may even lose foliage. Infection occurs when wind-borne C. ribicola spores from Ribes individuals make contact with the needles of a five-needled pine. The fungus eventually spreads to the entirety of the tree. Pine infection usually occurs in late summer or early fall, as the moderate temperatures and high relative humidity create optimal conditions for C. ribicola spore germination.

Most species of wild and cultivated Ribes species have demonstrated R-gene and multigenetic resistance to white pine blister rust, which are the two dominant forms of genetic disease resistance in plants. The species R. nigrum and R. hudsonianum var. petiolare are particularly vulnerable to white pine blister rust infection.

== Uses ==
A number of species produce edible berries, some of which are categorized as currants and gooseberries.

Blackfoot people used blackcurrant root (Ribes hudsonianum) for the treatment of kidney diseases and menstrual and menopausal problems. The Cree used the fruit of Ribes glandulosum as a fertility enhancer to assist women in becoming pregnant.

European immigrants who settled in North America in the 18th century typically made wine from both red and white currants.
