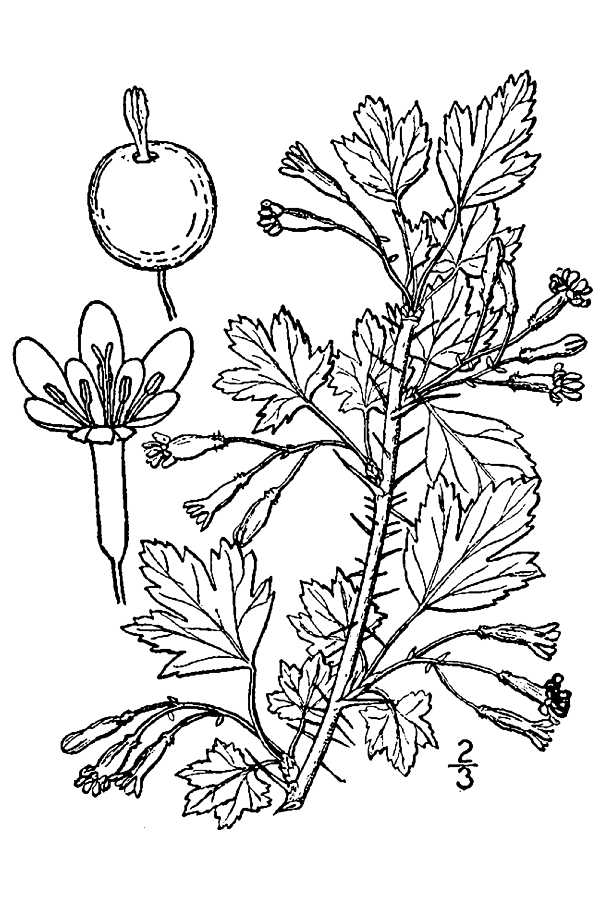
- ssp. setosum

Conservation status
- Secure (NatureServe)

Scientific classification
- Kingdom: Plantae
- Clade: Tracheophytes
- Clade: Angiosperms
- Clade: Eudicots
- Order: Saxifragales
- Family: Grossulariaceae
- Genus: Ribes
- Species: R. oxyacanthoides

Binomial name
- Ribes oxyacanthoides L. 1753

Synonyms
- Grossularia cognata (Greene) Coville & Britton; Ribes cognatum Greene; Ribes leucoderme A. Heller; Ribes non-scriptum (A.Berger) Standl.; Ribes setosum Lindl.; Ribes saximontanum E.E.Nelson

= Ribes oxyacanthoides =

Species of flowering plant

Ribes oxyacanthoides is a North American species of gooseberry known by the common name Canadian gooseberry. Its various subspecies have common names of their own.

== Description ==
In general, this plant is a shrub growing 0.5 to 2 metres (1 1/2 to 6 1/2 ft) in height. The ssp. hendersonii is sometimes smaller at maturity. The branches are covered in prickles and there are spines up to 1.3 centimetres (1/2 in) long at stem nodes. The deciduous leaves are 0.5 to 1.5 cm (1/4 to 5/8 in) wide, and smooth to glandular-hairy.

Flowers are solitary or borne in pairs or threes. They are white or pinkish in color. The fruit is a palatable berry up to 1.6 cm (5/8 in) wide; it is reddish, greenish, purple, or black in color.

== Subspecies ==
Subspecies include:

- R. o. ssp. cognatum (Umatilla gooseberry, stream currant) – Pacific Northwest
- R. o. ssp. hendersonii (Henderson's gooseberry) – Idaho, Montana, and Nevada
- R. o. ssp. irriguum (Idaho gooseberry, inland black gooseberry) – Pacific Northwest
- R. o. ssp. oxyacanthoides (northern gooseberry) – from Alaska to Newfoundland
- R. o. ssp. setosum (inland gooseberry, Missouri gooseberry) – Rocky Mountains and adjacent regions

The subspecies were previously considered to be five separate species of plant. They intergrade in some regions. These subspecies are sometimes called varieties.

== Distribution and habitat ==
The shrub is native to North America, where it occurs in Alaska through much of Canada and the western and north-central United States.

It grows in many types of habitat, particularly riverbanks and riparian woodlands. It grows in boreal forest habitat, often among conifers at lower elevations. Some subspecies occur at higher elevations, such as the dwarf ssp. hendersonii, which can be found in mountain talus.

== Ecology ==
This plant is an alternate host for the white pine blister rust (Cronartium ribicola), the vector of a pine tree disease. It is sometimes eradicated in attempts to control the rust.

Small amounts of this shrub and its fruit are present in the diets of wildlife species such as grizzly bear and mule deer.

== Uses ==
Humans find the berry somewhat palatable. Many Native American groups collected and stored it for food. The Ojibwa cooked and ate it with sweet corn and made it into preserves, for example. The root was used medicinally.
