= Black Current =

The Black Current was a Volkswagen Beetle, rebuilt with an electric motor.

This car's main purpose was to be used as a drag racer.

In 2011, the vehicle reached a 0–60 mph (0–97 km/h) time in 1.6 seconds.
