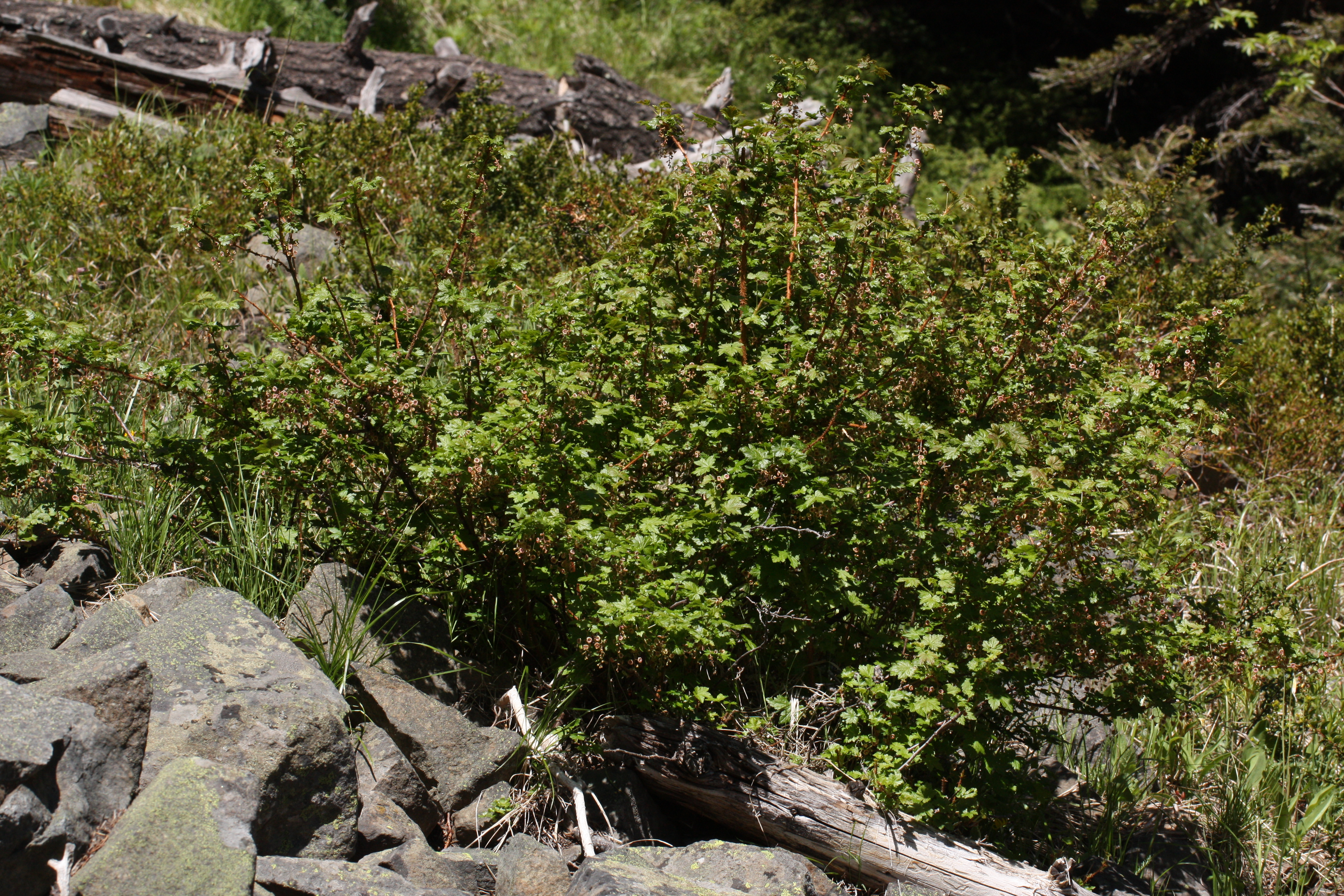

Conservation status
- Secure (NatureServe)

Scientific classification
- Kingdom: Plantae
- Clade: Tracheophytes
- Clade: Angiosperms
- Clade: Eudicots
- Order: Saxifragales
- Family: Grossulariaceae
- Genus: Ribes
- Species: R. lacustre

Binomial name
- Ribes lacustre (Pers.) Poir., 1812
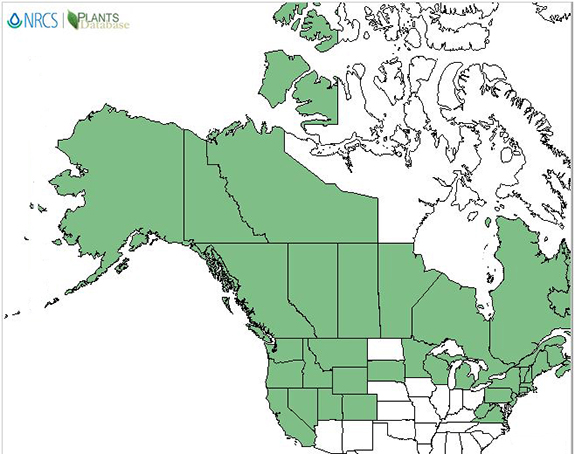
- Distribution

Synonyms
- List: Grossularia lacustris (Pers.) Ser. (1847); Ribes oxyacanthoides var. lacustre Pers. (1805); Limnobotrya lacustris (Pers.) Rydb. (1917); Ribes echinatum Douglas ex Lindl. (1830); Ribes parvulum (A.Gray) Rydb. (1900); Ribes setosum A.Gray (1872); Limnobotrya echinata Rydb. (1917); Limnobotrya parvula (A.Gray) Rydb. (1917)

= Ribes lacustre =

North American currant species

Ribes lacustre is a species of flowering plant known by the common names prickly currant, bristly black currant, black swamp gooseberry, and black gooseberry. It is a shrub widely distributed in North America.

== Description ==
The shrub grows erect to spreading, .5–2 metres (1 1/2–6 1/2 feet). The deciduous leaves are palmate, alternately arranged, and 2.5–5 centimetres (1–2 in) wide, usually with 5 deeply indented lobes and a heart-shaped base. Leaf margins are toothed, and the upper side is dark and glossy green.

Clusters of reddish to maroon flowers bloom from April through August. Racemes of 5 to 15 pink disk-shaped flowers hang from stems covered with short hairs, bristles and, at leaf nodes, larger thick spines. Bark on older stems is cinnamon-colored. The fruit consists of dark purple berries 6–8 millimetres (1/4–5/16 inch) long.

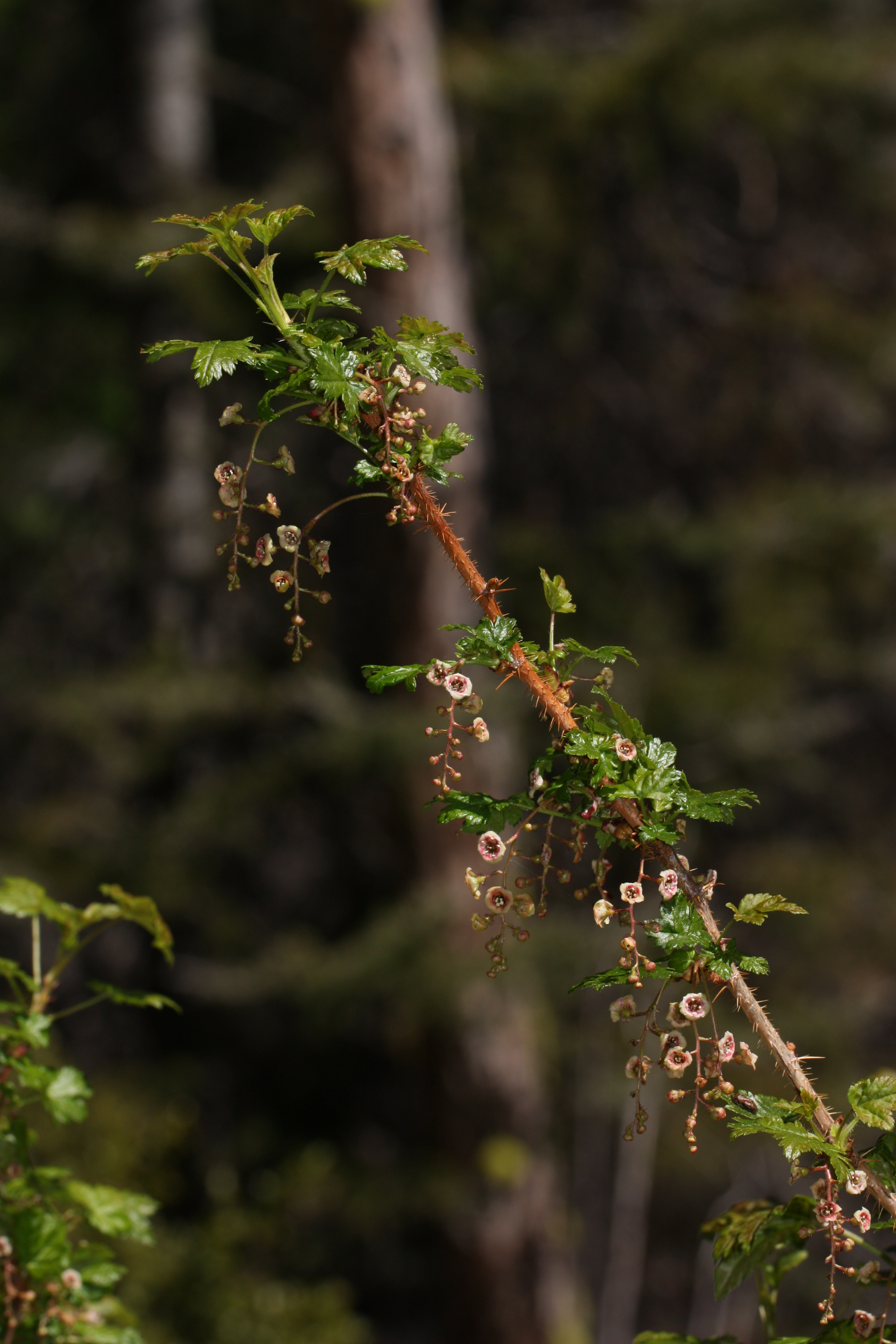
Hanging racemes

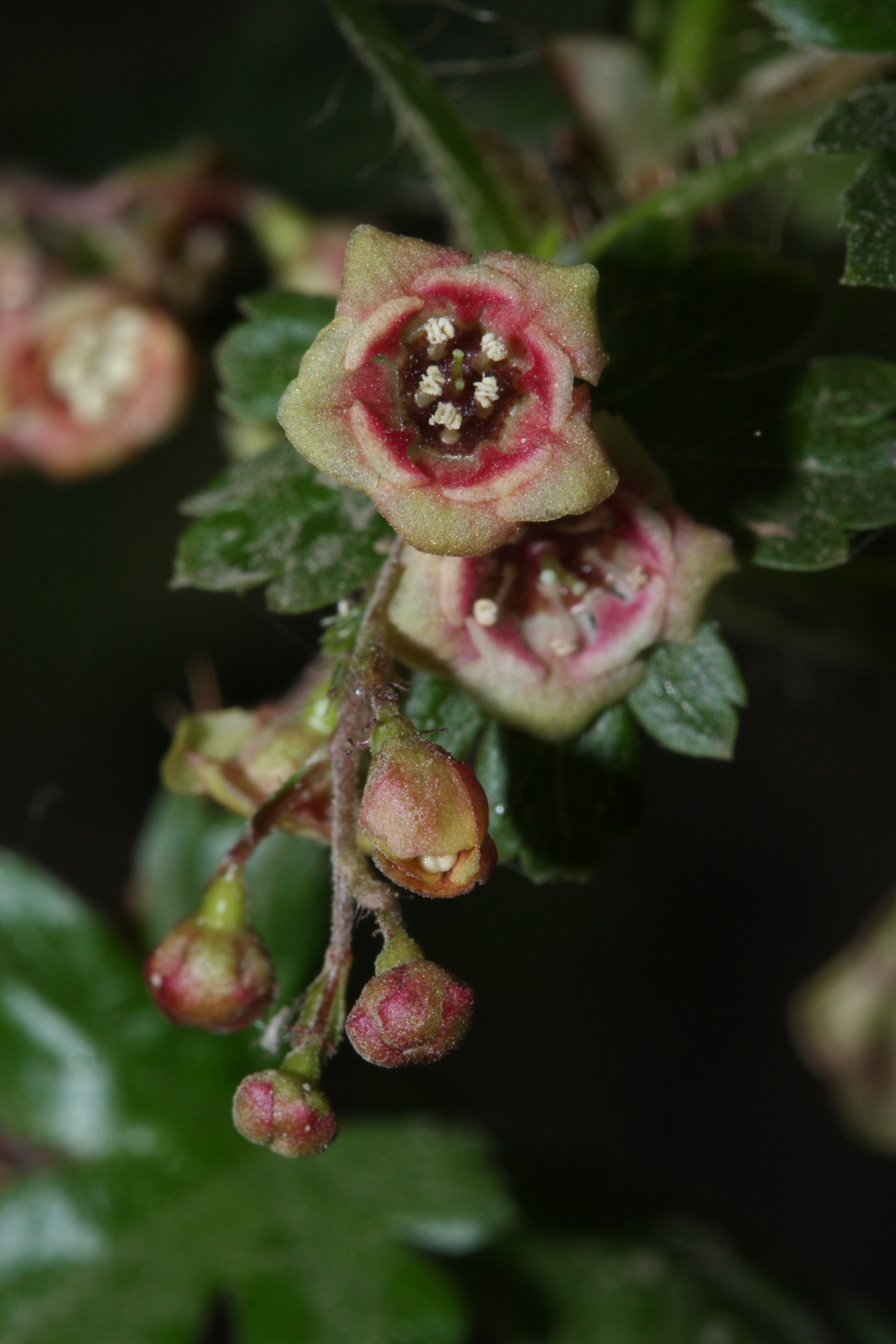
Flowers

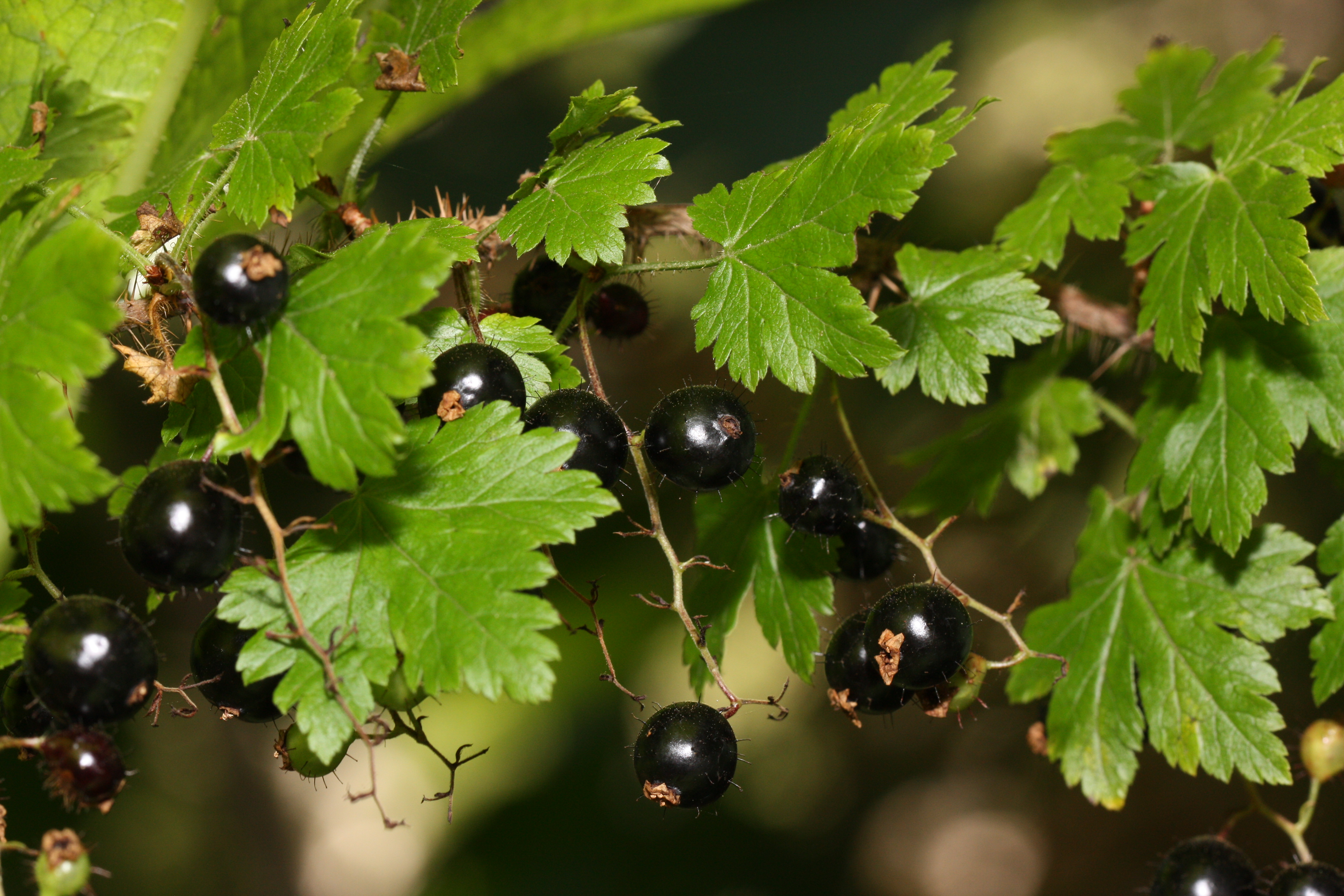
Leaves and fruit

== Distribution and habitat ==
It is widely distributed, from California to Alaska and across North America east to Pennsylvania and Newfoundland, and south as far as New Mexico. It may be found in low-elevation forests and swamps all the way up to the subalpine.

=== Preferred Sites ===
It is considered to be an extremely hardy species, capable of tolerating a wide range of soil types and conditions, as evidenced by its wide distribution. It occurs in moist woods and forests, meadow margins, streambanks, and on rough terrain such as avalanche chutes and rock crevices. It does not commonly form dense thickets.

=== Dispersal ===
Ribes lacustre regenerates primarily from seed, but can also regenerate vegetatively with adventitious roots which grow when the stems remain in prolonged contact with soil. Plants begin producing seeds when three to five years old, and each mature bush produces around 50-75 berries. Seeds are dispersed by animals or by falling from the parent plant. Seeds remain viable in the soil for long periods. In a mature forest in west-central Idaho, 51 viable prickly currant and sticky currant seeds were found per square foot of soil.

== Ecology ==
=== Use by Animals ===
Pricky currant berries are eaten by rodents, bears, birds, Mountain goats, Elk, Mule deer, and White-tailed deer. It is used as cover by birds and small mammals.

=== White Pine Blister Rust ===
The White pine blister rust uses Ribes species as part of its life cycle as an alternate host. Only a few prickly currant plants per acre are sufficient to perpetuate blister rust. In an effort to eradicate the rust and protect the economically important Western white pine, a federal ban on the cultivation and propagation of all Ribes species, including Ribes lacustre, went into effect in the early 1910s. Eradication efforts beginning in the 1920s were unsuccessful, as prickly currant is highly resistant to herbicide. The federal ban was lifted in 1966 and eradication attempts were ceased after the USDA successfully bred rust-resistant white pine strains, though local bans remained in place. New York lifted its ban in 2004, and as of 2025 it is illegal to cultivate Ribes lacustre in New Hampshire.

=== Succession ===
Prickly currant tolerates shade moderately well, but grows best in canopy openings. It establishes in the sun when the forest canopy is broken due to a disturbance such as wildfire or logging, then persists after the canopy closes up again. After a fire, it regenerates by recolonization from seed, or by regeneration from the root crown if it was able to survive. Even a low severity fire will top-kill the plant, and severe fires which remove the organic soil layer will kill the roots as well.

Outside its native range, Ribes species may be invasive.

== Human use ==
Most indigenous peoples of the Pacific Northwest Coast ate the berries, although the Sechelt considered them poisonous. The berries were eaten fresh when ripe, though they were not collected for storage due to their small size and low numbers. Like Devil's club, the spines of the plant were believed by some groups to have special protective powers against snakes and evil influences.

== See also ==
- Blackcurrant
- Jostaberry
