= Edward Janczewski =

Polish biologist (1846–1918)

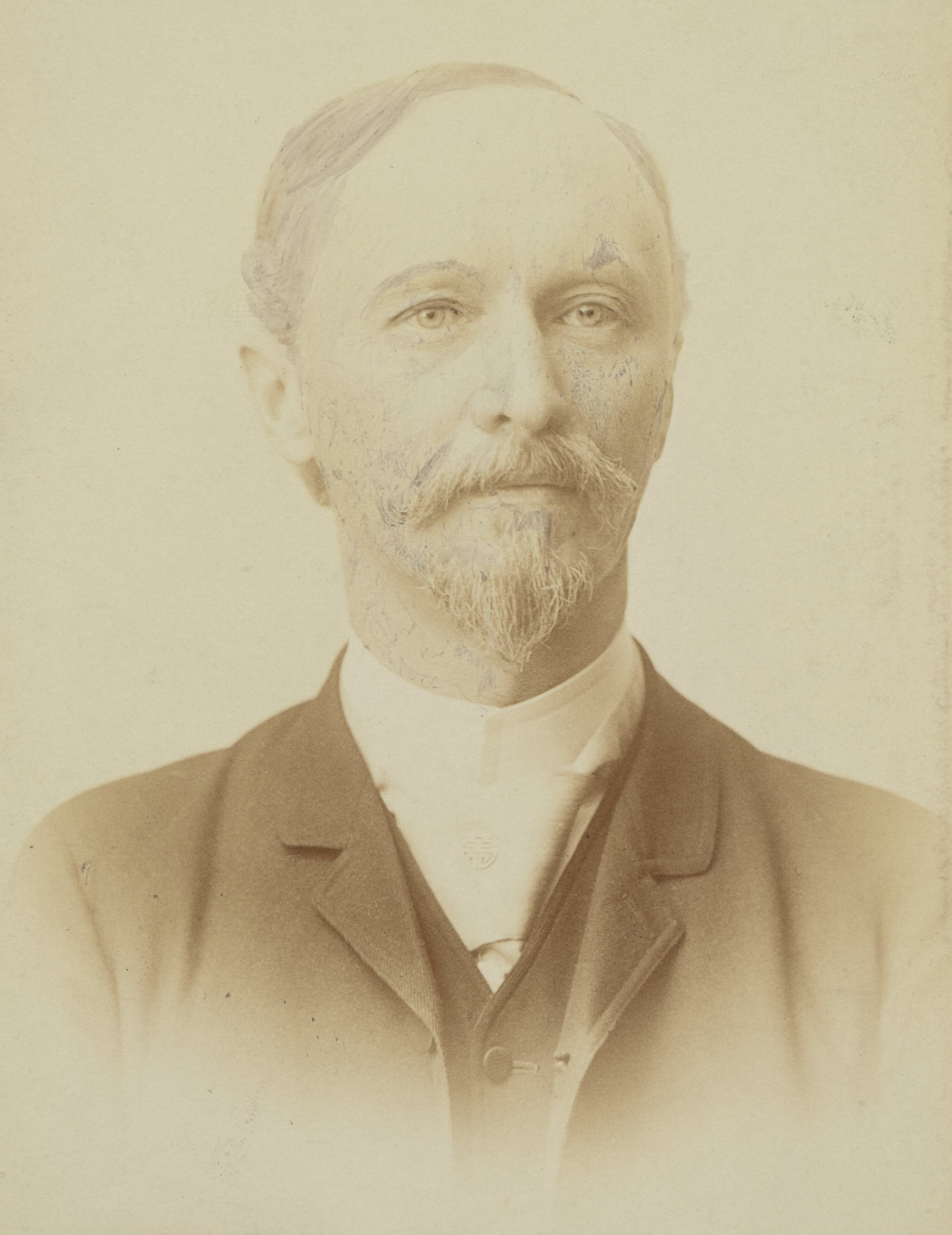
Janczewski in 1894

Edward Janczewski (Edward Franciszek Janczewski-Glinka) (14 December 1846, Blinstrubiszki, Kovno Governorate – 17 July 1918, Kraków) was a Polish biologist (taxonomist, anatomist, and morphologist), rector of the Jagiellonian University, and member of the Academy of Learning. He married Jadwiga Szetkiewicz (1856–1941).

== Life and career ==
In 1862, Janczewski obtained a degree at Vilna (Wilno). Afterwards, he studied natural sciencies in the Jagiellonian University, and in Saint Petersburg. He became a professor of plant anatomy and physiology in 1875 at the Jagiellonian University, wherein he was rector from 1902 to 1903, and worked there until 1913.

In 1876, Janczewski entered to the Academy of Learning, of which he became an active member in 1885. Janczewski was also member of other international scientific societies, among them: The National Academic Society of Cherbourg (“Societé Nationale Académique de Cherbourg”), the Edinburgh Botanical Society, and the French Académie des sciences.

His works included the discovery of how plant roots grow and initial genetic research in the area of plants. He also researched algae and mushrooms. Probably, one of his most important works was Monographie des Groseilliers (Geneve, 1907), which contains the results of his work on genus Ribes. In that monograph, Edward Janczewski described 133 species and 21 hybrids of currants and gooseberries, according to him, approximately half of world's taxa. Many species were first described by him. This monograph is still one of the most important publications regarding taxonomy of genus Ribes.

In the Botanic Garden of Cracow, Janczewski maintained a vast collection of different species of Ribes from all around the world. The herbarium includes species from Europe, Asia, North and South America, many of them collected by Janczewski himself. Others were obtained thanks to his worldwide contacts with herbariums, botanic gardens and scientists, such as the Mexican naturalist Fernando Altamirano.

== Selected works ==
- Le parasitisme du Nostoc Lichenoides (1872)
- Recherches sur les Porphyria (1872)
- O rurkach sitkowych w korzeniach (1874)
- Poszukiwania nad wzrostem wierzchołkowym korzeni roślin okrytoziarnowych (1874)
- Rozwój pączka u skrzypów (1876)
- Zawilec. Anemone. Studyum morfologiczne (1892-1896 4 volumes)
- Trzy metody hodowli drzew owocowych (1896)
- Głownie zbożowe na Żmujdzi (1897)
- Species generis ribes (1905-1906 3 volumes)
- Monographie des groseilliers Ribes L. (1907)

In recognition of his work, Edward Janczewski was awarded the Prix de Candolle (a Swiss award). In addition, at least, one genus and seven species of plants were named after him.

== Genus and Species named after Edward (Glinka) Janczewski ==
- Janczewskia (Solms-Laubach, 1877)
- Lappa janczewskii (Dybowski, 1904)
- Bromus janczewskii (Zapal, 1904)
- Poa janczewskii (Zapal, 1906)
- Ribes janczewskii (Pojarkova, 1929)
- Anemone janczewskii (Giraudias, 1891)
- Pulsatilla janczewskii (Zapal, 1908)
- Salix janczewskii (Zapal, 1908)
