= Two Eagles Balloon =

General information
- Type: Rozière balloon
- National origin: America
- Manufacturer: Cameron Balloons
- Status: world record
- Number built: 1

History
- First flight: 2015

The Two Eagles Balloon is a custom balloon designed to break world records. A January 2015 launch from Japan toward North America has officially broken two world records as validated by the Fédération Aéronautique Internationale.

== Development ==
The balloon was developed by a crew which included members of Steve Fossett's Spirit of Freedom balloon crew. The balloon was initially developed for a 2005 and later 2008 flight attempt by Troy Bradley using the name Celestial Eagle with a crew including Tim Cole, Bert Padelt and John Kugler. The launch 2008 attempt from Japan was canceled due to weather that would have placed the balloon in storms off California and jet streams which may have altered path to Alaska.

== Design ==
The 100 kg Kevlar-Carbon fiber capsule was built by Composite Tooling in Albuquerque, New Mexico. The 7ftx5ft capsule carries 10,000 lb in ballast. The gondola is outfitted with a wide angle GoPro camera.

The unpressurized cockpit requires pilots to use supplemental oxygen above 12,000 ft altitude. The insulated gondola temperature is expected to have an operating temperature of 50 degrees F. Members of the Cognitive Engineering Research Institute in Mesa, Arizona will study fatigue effects during the record-attempting flight.

To slow down for landing, ropes will be dropped into the ocean to create drag prior to a planned landing on a sand dune. Lower sections of the gondola can be flooded with water for stability in a water landing.

== Operational history ==
- January 25, 2015 - Pilots Troy Bradley of the United States and Leonid Tiukhtyaev of Russia launch from Saga Prefecture, Japan on a record setting attempt. The initial planned route sets a landing spot in Canada. The Anderson-Abruzzo Albuquerque International Balloon Museum is used as mission control for the attempt.
- January 2015 - The Two Eagles Balloon broke the unofficial world record for distance traveled in a gas balloon, exceeding 5,260 miles set by the Double Eagle V.
- 29 January 2015 - The planned landing location shifts to Baja, Mexico.
- January 30, 2015 - The unofficial record for time aloft in a gas balloon of 137 hours, 5 minutes and 50 seconds set in 1978 by the Double Eagle II is exceeded by the Two Eagles Balloon team.
- The Two Eagles crew landed the balloon in the ocean four miles off the Baja coast on 31 January 2015. The time aloft was six days, 160 hours and 37 minutes with 6,656 miles traveled.
- July 15, 2015 - FAI ratifies record attempts. Official time aloft is 160 h 34 min, distance is 10,711.6 km.

== Specifications ==
Data from Two Eagles

General characteristics

- Length: 141.6 ft (43.2 m)
- Diameter: 91.6 ft (27.9 m)
- Volume: 350,000 cu ft (9,900 m^{3})
- Empty weight: 1,475 lb (669 kg)
- Useful lift: 14,500 lb (6,600 kg)

Performance

- Endurance: 10 days
