= Don Cameron (balloonist) =

Scottish aviator (born 1939)

Don Cameron MBE
- Don Cameron in the 1970s (Top Right)
- Born: 16 July 1939 (age 87); Glasgow, Scotland
- Education: University of Glasgow (B.S.); Cornell University (M.S.)
- Employer: Cameron Balloons
- Known for: Breitling Orbiter; Spirit of Freedom (balloon)

Don Cameron (born 16 July 1939) is a Scottish balloonist, and later founder of Cameron Balloons, the world's largest hot air balloon manufacturer. Don Cameron is one of the few aeronauts to be awarded the Harmon Trophy, as the 'World's Outstanding Aviator' in 1999.

He was appointed Member of the Order of the British Empire (MBE) in the 2014 New Year Honours for services to Design and Manufacturing.

== Early life and career ==
Born in Glasgow in 1939, Cameron went to Allan Glen's School and then went on to study aeronautical engineering at the University of Glasgow, graduating in 1961. In 1963 he obtained a master's degree at Cornell, United States. He then joined the Bristol Aeroplane Company.

Cameron developed the hot air balloon entitled Bristol Belle which flew for the first time at Weston on the Green in Oxfordshire, England on 9 July 1967. In 1968 Cameron and Leslie Goldsmith founded Omega Balloons which constructed ten balloons, before the company split into Cameron Balloons and Western Balloons in 1970.

Cameron Balloons of Bristol, England, was formed by Cameron in 1971. The new company was based in Cotham, Bristol where a total of twenty nine balloons were made in the basement of the property. 1971 also saw Cameron build Golden Eagle, a balloon designed specifically to fly across the Sahara to shoot a film for Jack Le Vien.

In 1978 his attempt to make the Atlantic crossing by balloon ended when bad weather forced his heated helium balloon Zanussi down after a 2,000-mile flight from Canada. It was piloted by Cameron and Christopher Davey. They left St. John's, Newfoundland and Labrador on 26 July 1978, covered 1,780 miles, and ditched on 30 July 1978 in the Bay of Biscay only 110 miles from France after a tear developed in the balloon. The two planned a second attempt, but discarded their plans when the Double Eagle II successfully made a transatlantic flight three weeks later. Cameron and Davey were awarded the Gold Medal of the Royal Aero Club in the same year.

Cameron has received the gold, silver and bronze medals of the Royal Aero Club for his ballooning achievements which include being the first man to cross the Sahara and the Alps by hot-air balloon, and making the first flight between the UK and the former USSR in 1990.

== Cameron Rozière balloon ==
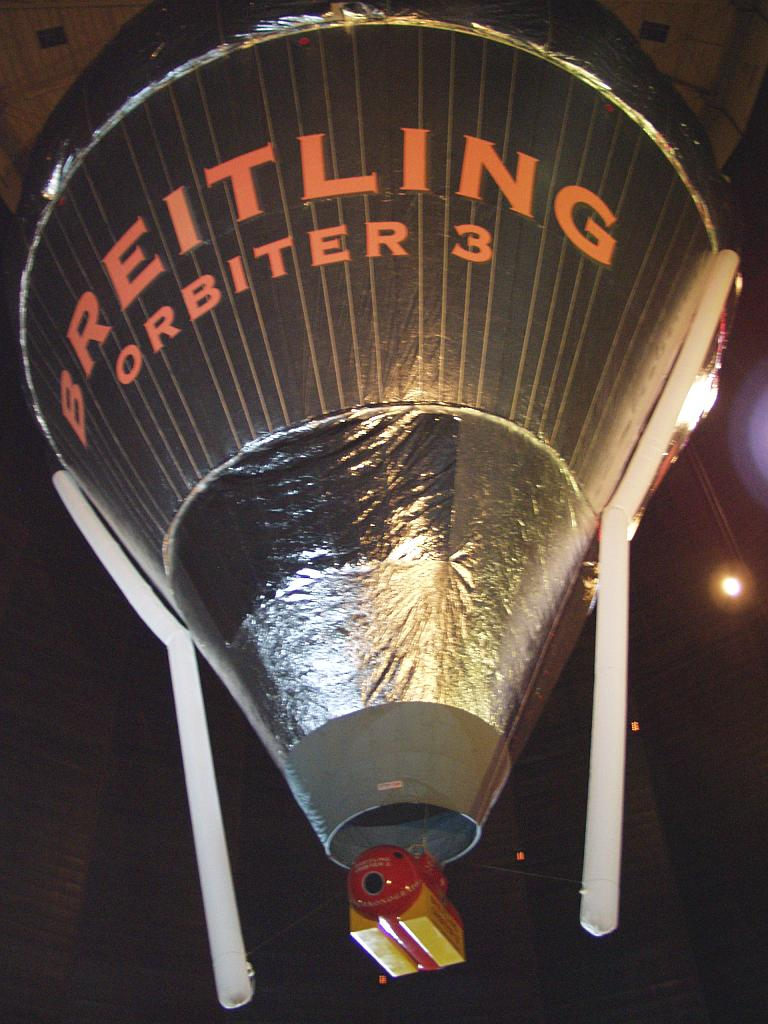
Envelope of the Breitling Orbiter 3 exhibited at the Gasometer Oberhausen from 2004 to 2006.

Labeled the "epitome of his achievement" Don Cameron redesigned the helium and hot-air balloon combination into the Cameron Roziere balloon which reached multiple milestones. In 1992 Don Cameron fulfilled his transatlantic dream by designing and flying his Roziere balloon from Bangor, Maine, U.S. to Portugal, taking second place in the first ever transatlantic balloon race.

Taking off from South Korea and landing on 21 February 1995 in Leader, Saskatchewan, flying a Cameron Roziere, Steve Fossett became the first person to make a solo flight across the Pacific Ocean in a balloon.

In 1999 a Cameron Roziere balloon R-650, named the Breitling Orbiter 3, made the first non-stop flight round the world.

Don Cameron and Tim Cole designed and built the Spirit of Freedom (balloon) Rozière balloon. Cameron built the envelope and Cole the capsule. In 2002 solo aviator Steve Fossett flew the Spirit of Freedom to become the first successful around the world nonstop solo flight in any kind of aircraft. On 19 June 2002 the 10-story high balloon Spirit of Freedom lifted off from Northam, Western Australia and landed in Queensland, Australia on 3 July 2002 (Independence Day in the United States). The solo flight circumnavigation lasted 13 days, 8 hours, 33 minutes (14 days 19 hours 50 minutes to landing) and covered 20,626.48 statute miles (33,195.10 km). They (Fossett & Spirit of Freedom) reached speeds of up to 322 kilometres (204 miles) per hour, and flew as high as 10,580 metres (34,700 feet).
