= Breitling Emergency =

Swiss luxury watch

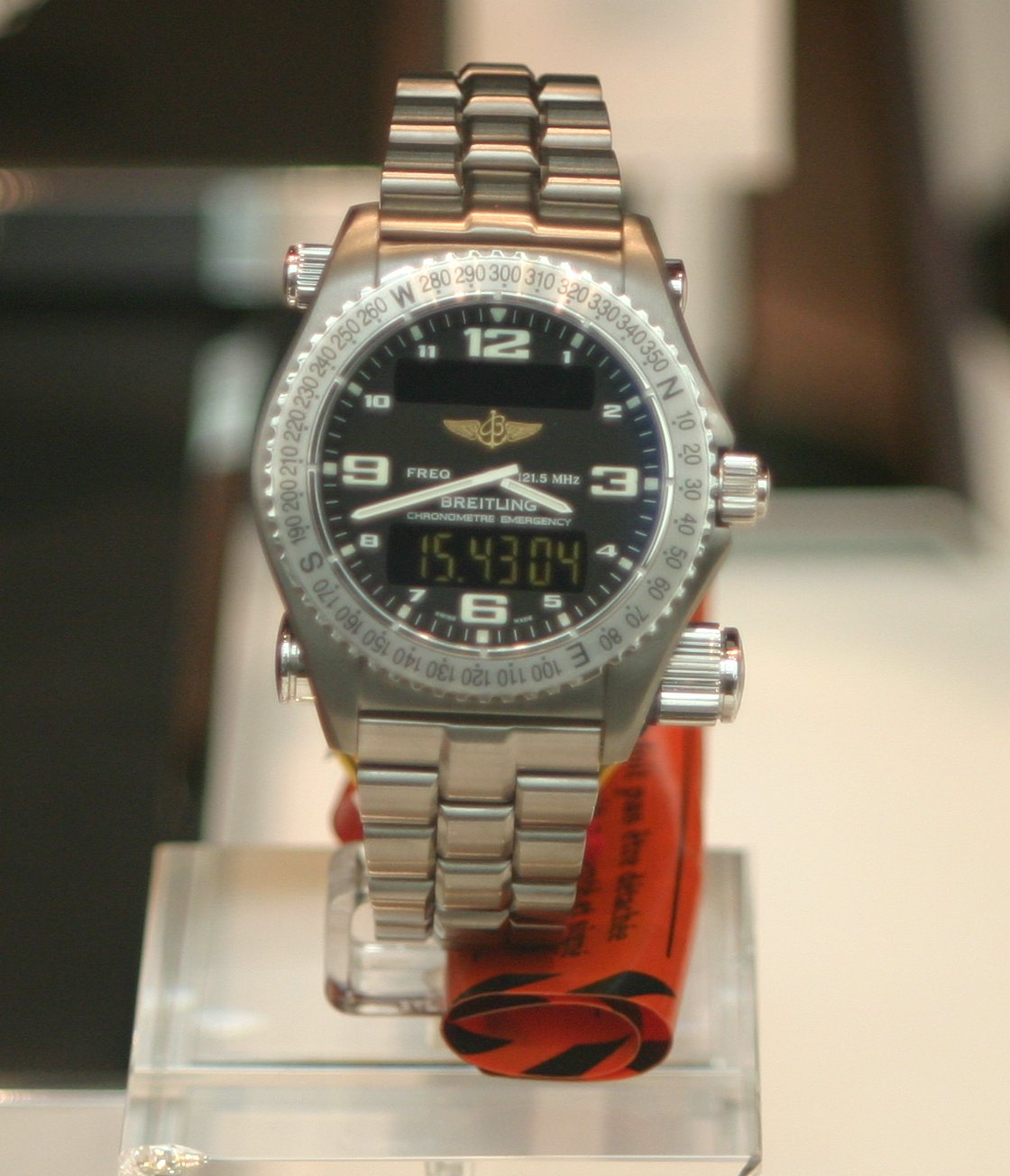
- Breitling Emergency, Ref. E76321 (circa 2002–2012). A 43mm titanium watch featuring a black analogue-digital dial, and rotating compass bezel.
- Manufacturer: Breitling SA
- Type: Quartz
- Display: Hybrid analogue/ digital
- Introduced: 1995

The Breitling Emergency is a luxury watch produced by Breitling SA, that notably contains a radio transmitter for civil aviation use. The transmitter broadcasts on the 121.5 MHz distress frequency and serves as a backup for ELT-type airborne beacons.

== History ==
The Breitling Emergency was conceived following a visit from then CEO Ernest Schneider, who took part in a NATO roundtable discussion about the unreliability of emergency locator beacons. He returned and briefed company engineers to design a watch which contained a beacon that could be used to locate its wearer in the event of an emergency. The original model was developed in partnership with French avionics manufacturer, Dassault Electronique. The watch took seven years and $7 million in development costs before debuting in 1995.

== Functionality ==
For military users, the Emergency has a miniaturized transmitter operating on the 243.0 MHz military aviation emergency frequency. Under normal conditions—flat terrain or calm seas—the signal can be picked up at a range of up to 90 nautical miles (170 km) by search aircraft flying at 20,000 feet (6,100 m).

Since February 2009, the Cospas-Sarsat Satellite System has not monitored the 121.5/243.0 MHz frequency; however, the signal transmitted by the Emergency was never strong enough to be picked up by satellite, and Breitling has announced that, as these frequencies will still be monitored by aviation, particularly during the localization phase of a rescue attempt, there are no plans to modify the signal's frequency.

The model was heavily advertised by the Breitling Orbiter 3, with both Brian Jones and Bertrand Piccard wearing the Emergency. Breitling sponsored the Orbiter 3 project, which in 1999 became the first balloon to completely orbit the Earth without landing. A commemorative Orbiter 3 version of the Emergency watch was subsequently produced, with a production run of 1,999.

== Verified uses ==
In 2002, a Swiss paratrooper activated his watch and was rescued after injuring his ankle and being separated from his group.

In January 2003 two British pilots, Squadron Leader Steve Brooks and Flight Lieutenant Hugh Quentin-Smith, crashed their helicopter in Antarctica and were rescued after activating their Breitling Emergency transmitter watches.

== In popular culture ==
The Breitling Emergency was featured in the 22nd season of the TV show Top Gear, activated by host Richard Hammond on Wolf Mountain, British Columbia.
