= Tim Cole (disambiguation) =

Tim Cole (1960–1999) was an American student wrongly convicted of rape.

Tim or Timothy Cole may also refer to:

- Timothy Cole, wood engraver
- Tim Cole (balloonist)
- Tim Cole, producer and vocalist of the band The Correspondents
