= Rozière balloon =

Balloon design with heated and non-heated gas

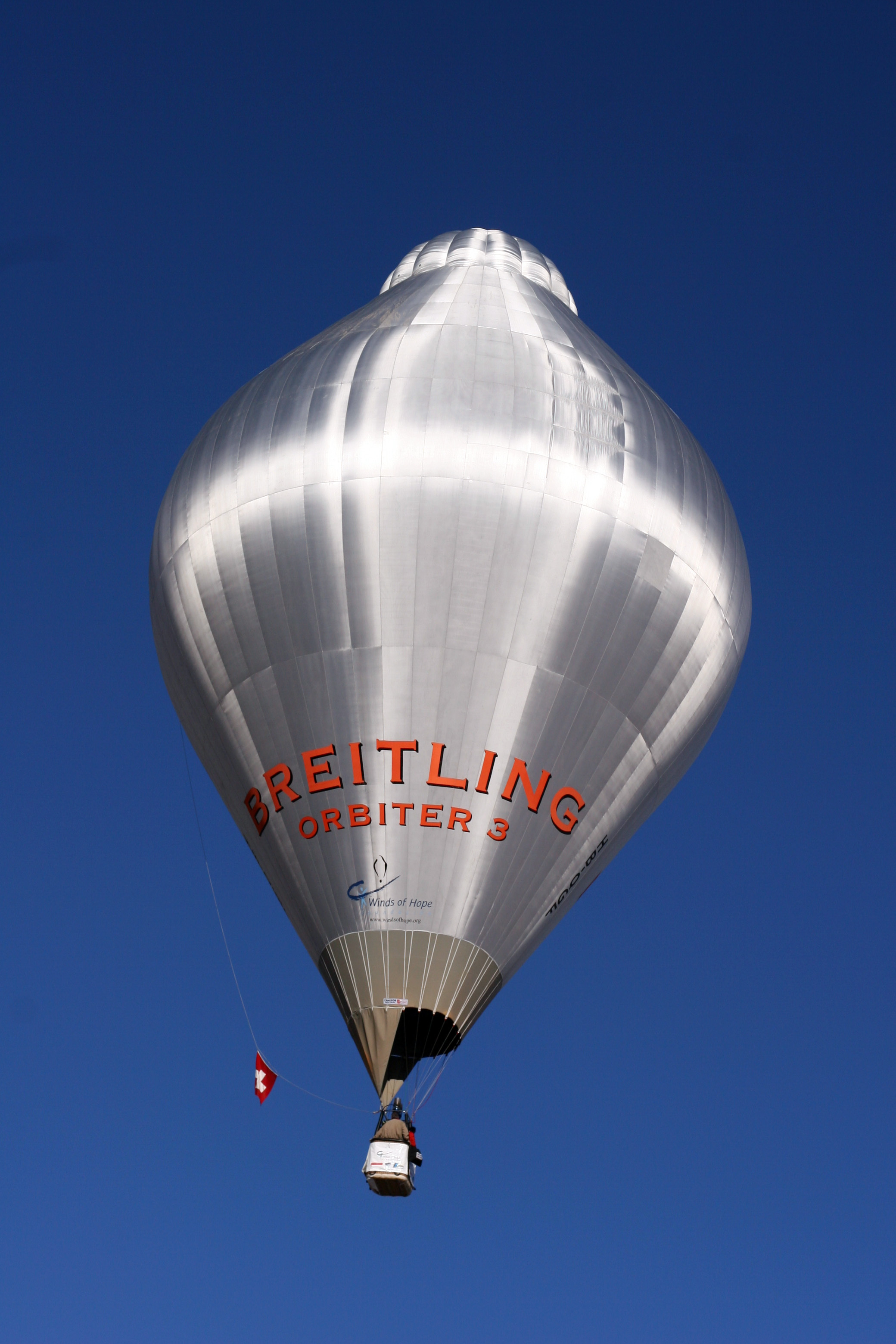
During 1999, Bertrand Piccard and Brian Jones achieved the first non-stop balloon circumnavigation in Breitling Orbiter 3, a Rozière balloon.

A Rozière balloon (or simply Rozière) is a hybrid balloon that has separate chambers for a non-heated lifting gas (such as hydrogen or helium) as well as for a heated lifting gas (as used in a hot air balloon, or Montgolfière). The design was created by Jean-François Pilâtre de Rozier (1754–1785).

A Rozière-type balloon has the advantage of partial control of buoyancy with much less use of fuel than a typical hot air balloon. This reduction of fuel consumption has allowed Rozière balloons and their crews to achieve very long flight times, as much as several days or even weeks.

== Early endeavours ==
The first Rozière was built for an attempt at crossing the English Channel on 15 June 1785. Contemporary accounts state that the balloon caught fire, suddenly deflated and crashed near Wimereux in the Pas-de-Calais, killing Rozier, who was riding the balloon.

== Modern era ==
Today's Rozière designs use non-flammable helium rather than hydrogen. Their primary application is for extremely long-duration flights.

The first successful Atlantic crossing was made 31 August to 2 September 1986, Newfoundland to the Netherlands, by Brink, Brink, and Hageman in the balloon Dutch Viking.

During February 1992, the first east-to-west Atlantic crossing was achieved by Feliu and Green.

Four Cameron-R77s made Atlantic crossings, west to east, during September 1992. One was co-piloted by Bertrand Piccard.

Australian adventurer Dick Smith and his co-pilot John Wallington made the first balloon voyage across Australia, in another Cameron-R77 Rozière, Australian Geographic Flyer, on 18 June 1993, earning the 1995 Montgolfier Diploma.

Steve Fossett made the first successful Pacific crossing during February 1995.

On 27 February 1999, while they were trying to circumnavigate the world by balloon, Colin Prescot and Andy Elson set a new endurance record after flying in a Rozière combined helium and hot-air balloon (the Cable & Wireless balloon) for 233 hours and 55 minutes. Then on 21 March of that year, Bertrand Piccard and Brian Jones became the first to circumnavigate the Earth, in a Rozière known as the Breitling Orbiter 3, in a flight lasting 477 hours, 47 minutes.

On 4 July 2002, after five previous attempts, Steve Fossett became the first to achieve a round the world solo flight also in a Rozière named the Spirit of Freedom.

On 23 July 2016, Fyodor Konyukhov completed a round-the-world solo flight in a Rozière in just over 11 days, setting a new world record.

== See also ==
- Timeline of hydrogen technologies
- List of firsts in aviation

== Bibliography ==
- Davis, Jeffrey R.; Johnson, Robert; Stepanek, Jan; and Fogarty, Jennifer A. Fundamentals of Aerospace Medicine. Philadelphia: Lippincott Williams & Wilkins, 2008.
- Federal Aviation Administration. United States Department of Transportation. Balloon Flying Handbook. FAA-H-8083-11A. Washington, D.C.: U.S. Government Printing Office, 2007.
- Glenday, Craig. Guinness World Records 2011. New York: Bantam Books, 23 11.
- Shectman, Jonathan. Groundbreaking Scientific Experiments, Inventions, and Discoveries of the 18th Century. Westport, Conn.: Greenwood Press, 2003.
