= Spirit of Freedom (balloon) =

American aircraft balloon

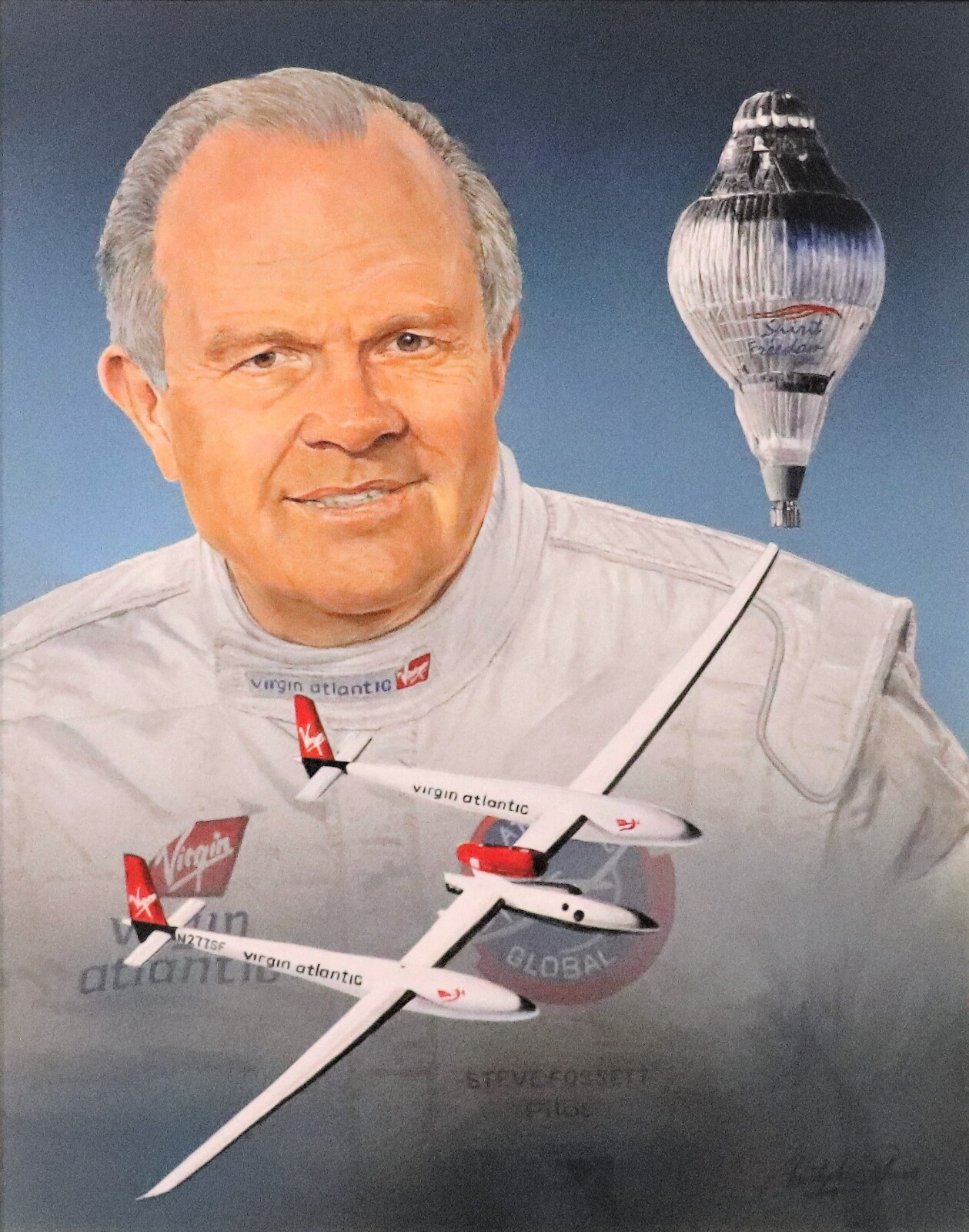
	First Solo Around The World Balloon Flight; Spirit of Freedom balloon over left shoulder

Balloon
- Envelope: 43 m (141 ft) tall by 18 m (59 ft) wide inflated
- Fuel: 38 tanks of Propane & Ethane
- Type: Rozier balloon
- Manufacturer: Don Cameron of Cameron Balloons Ltd. Bristol, England

Gondola
- Manufacturer: Tim Cole of Greeley, Colorado
- Dimensions: 132 by 94 by 65 inches (340 cm × 240 cm × 170 cm)
- Weight: 600 pounds (270 kg)
- Material: Kevlar and carbon
- Cabin Pressure: unpressurized
- Gondola Location: National Air and Space Museum permanent display

The Spirit of Freedom balloon was a Rozière balloon designed and built by Donald Cameron and Tim Cole. In 2002 solo pilot Steve Fossett flew the Spirit of Freedom to become the first successful around-the-world nonstop solo flight in any kind of aircraft. On June 19, 2002, the 10-story-high balloon Spirit of Freedom lifted off from Northam, Western Australia, and landed in Queensland, Australia, on July 3, 2002. The solo flight circumnavigation lasted 13 days, 8 hours, 33 minutes (14 days 19 hours 50 minutes to landing) and covered 20,626.48 statute miles (33,195.10 km). During this flight, the balloon reached speeds of up to 322 kilometers (200 miles) per hour, and flew as high as 10,580 meters (34,710 feet).

== Background ==
=== Balloon ===
The Spirit-of-Freedom was a Rozière balloon, which combines the features of a hot-air balloon and a gas balloon, with a helium cell within a hot-air envelope. It was designed by Donald Cameron of Cameron Balloons Ltd. of Bristol, England. Thirty-eight tanks hanging beside the capsule were filled with 69% propane and 31% ethane fueling the burners on top. The heated air warmed the helium to lift the balloon. Steering was accomplished by ascending or descending into favorable wind direction. Initially, the helium cell was filled to approximately 47% of its maximum capacity. During ascent, warming by the sun caused the helium to expand even more than the surrounding air, which aided the balloon in gaining altitude (unlike the expansion caused by the drop in atmospheric pressure, which can hinder that until the air and helium temperatures equalize). The 140-foot-tall (43 m) balloon envelope utilized a Comstock Autopilot Computer to keep a constant altitude by controlling the burners, allowing Fossett time to sleep under automatic control. When joined with the gondola, the entire aircraft measured 180 by 108 feet (55 by 33 meters).

=== Capsule ===
Designed and built by Tim Cole Sr. of Greeley, Colorado, out of kevlar and carbon with a clear bubble hatch. The Spirit-of-Freedom gondola, the size of a closet, had a bench and a sleeping bag. Fossett used an autopilot designed by Bruce Comstock to control the burners while he averaged four hours of sleep per day in 45-minute naps. He ate military rations called MREs which were heated with water-activated chemical heat packs. Fossett would have to regularly climb out into the sub-zero temperatures to change fuel tanks. Besides the Comstock autopilot, the gondola equipment included GPS, Inmarsat, and satellite phone backup for communications with Mission Control at Washington University in St. Louis. Fossett used radios for communications with air traffic control and other aircraft. An emergency position-indicating rescue beacon (EPIRB) was on board to aid search and rescue. The unpressurized gondola used lithium batteries to power the electronic equipment. A custom heater designed by engineer Andy Elson regulates the aircraft internal temperature between 4 and 21 °C (39 and 70 °F).

=== Pilot ===
Steve Fossett’s first significant aviation endeavor was distance ballooning. The year after earning his Lighter than Air FAA certificate, Fossett's first major flight in August 1994 with copilot Tim Cole flew across the Atlantic from Canada to Germany. At that time, no manned balloon had ever flown more than six days or 5000 miles. Later, Tim Cole designed and built the Spirit of Freedom gondola and was also selected as Project Director of the Spirit of Freedom flight.

On February 21, 1995, Fossett was the first person to make a solo flight across the Pacific Ocean in a balloon from South Korea to Leader, Saskatchewan. On March 21, 1999, the Breitling Orbiter 3 was the first balloon to fly around the world non-stop.

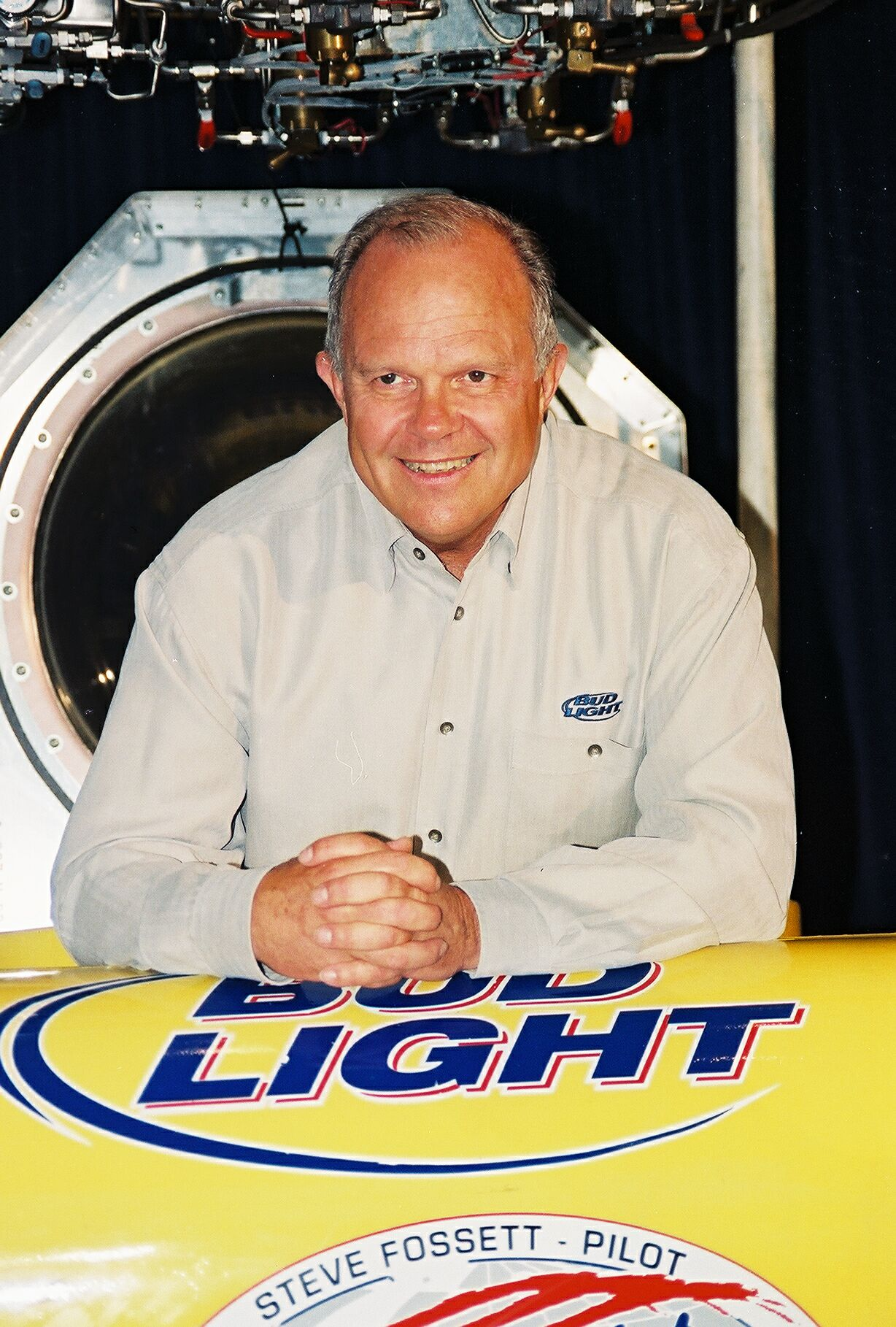
Steve Fossett in the Spirit-of Freedom capsule

After five previous attempts, on July 3, 2002, Steve Fossett became the first person to fly around the world alone, nonstop in any kind of aircraft in just under 15 days in the Spirit of Freedom balloon.

While Fossett had financed five previous tries himself, his successful record-setting flight was sponsored by Bud Light. In the end, Fossett actually made money on all his balloon flights. He bought a contingency insurance policy for $500,000 that would pay him $3 million if he succeeded in the flight. Along with sponsorship, that payout meant that in the end Fossett did not have to spend any of his money other than for initial expenses.

=== Flight ===
Fossett launched the 10-story-high balloon Spirit of Freedom from Northam, Western Australia on June 19, 2002, and returned to Australia on July 3, 2002, subsequently landing in Queensland, Australia. He would climb or descend to navigate via the most favorable winds. Fossett mainly cruised at over 8,000 meters (26,000 feet) and breathed oxygen from a liquid oxygen system. Duration and distance of this solo balloon flight was 13 days, 8 hours, 33 minutes to circumnavigate the globe and 14 days 19 hours 50 minutes to landing total time covering 20,626.48 statute miles (33,195.10 km). The balloon dragged him along the ground for 20 minutes at the end of the flight. The capsule survived the landing and was donated to the Smithsonian Institution in Washington, D.C. where it is on permanent display. The envelope was destroyed in the landing, but a miniature hangs in the Anderson-Abruzzo Albuquerque International Balloon Museum in Albuquerque, New Mexico. The control center for the mission was in Brookings Hall at Washington University in St. Louis. Fossett's top speed during the flight was set over the Indian Ocean. The trip ballooning records include: Fastest (200 miles per hour or 320 kilometres per hour, breaking his own previous record of 166 miles per hour or 270 kilometres per hour), Fastest Around the World (13.5 days), Longest Distance Flown Solo in a Balloon (20,482.26 miles or 32,963.00 kilometres), and 24-Hour Balloon Distance (3,186.80 miles or 5,128.66 kilometres on July 1).

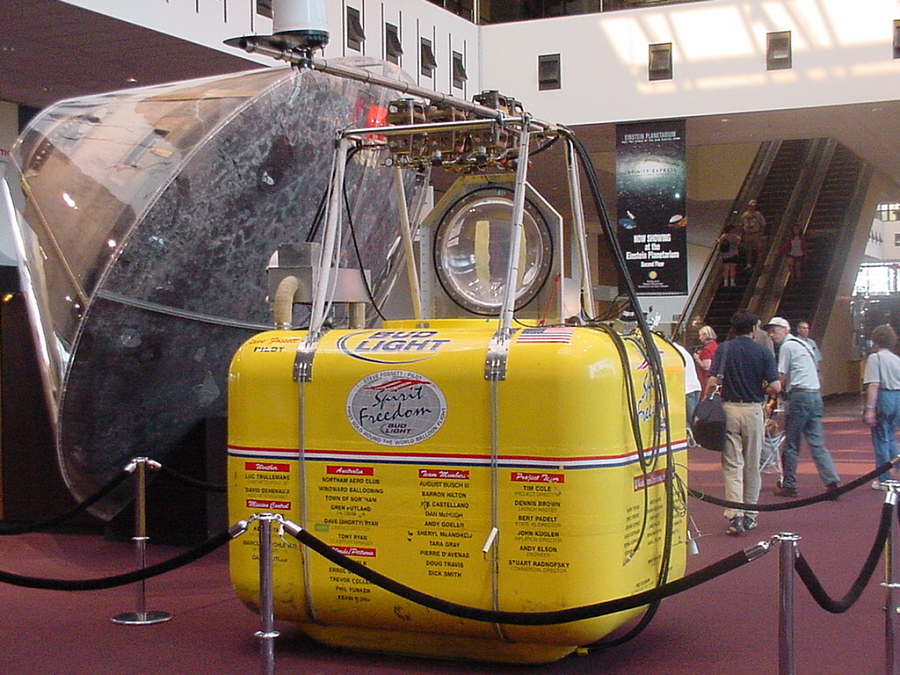
Apollo 11 capsule with the Spirit-of Freedom capsule

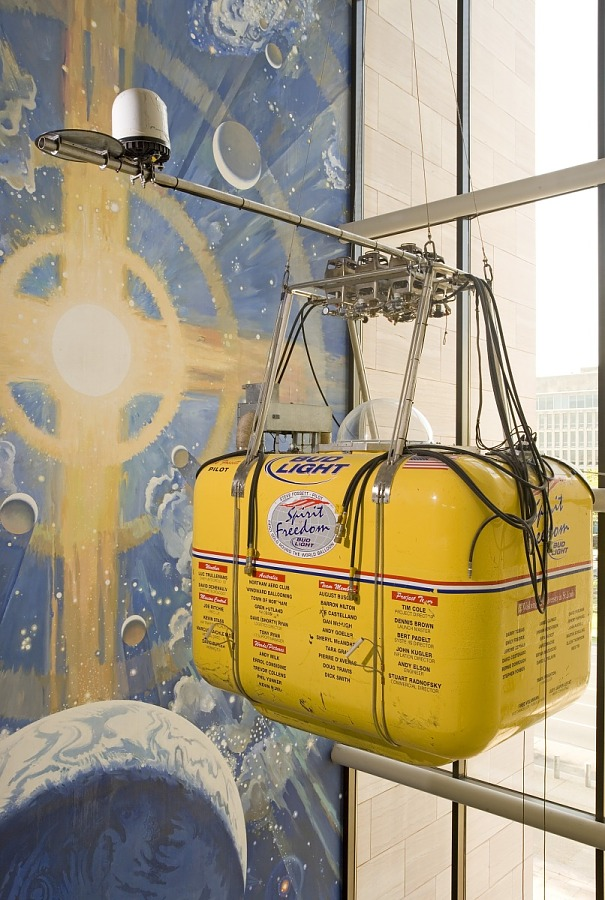
Spirit Of Freedom gondola

== Mission team ==
Pilot: Steve Fossett

Weather Team: Luc Trullemans Chief Meteorologist; David Dehenauw Assistant Meteorologist.

Mission Control: Joe Ritchie Director; Kevin Stass Air Traffic Specialist; Marcus Raichle M.D. Medical Director; David Butler webmaster

Australia Team: Northam Aero Club; Winward Ballooning; Gren Futland FAI Observer; Dave (Shorty) Ryan Logistics Director; Tony Ryan Support Manager.

Words/Pictures Team: Andy Milk; Errol Considine; Trevor Collens; Phil Yunker; Kevin Bond

Team Members: August Busch III; Barron Hilton; Joe Castellano; Dan McHugh; Sheryl McAndrew; Tara Gray; Pierre D'Avenas; Doug Travis; Dick Smith.

Project Team: Tim Cole Project Director; Dennis Brown Launch Master; Bert Padelt Systems Director; John Kugler Inflation Director; Andy Elson Engineer; Stuart Radnosfsky Commercial Director.

== Steve Fossett Round the World efforts ==
A seven-year project, Fossett believed that achieving the first solo round-the-world balloon flight was highly important. Developing technology to fly at great durations and distances. He also believed he was the right person to do a solo flight with his balloon, navigation and high altitude experience. He didn't want to be seen as "...the rich guy flying with an expert." Additionally, flying solo saved significant room and weight. Restricted overflight permissions and dangers by some Northern Hemisphere countries moved efforts to the Southern Hemisphere which had its own dangers. The southern route made search and rescue difficult with hazardous and remote seas. Fossett experienced these threats on Aug. 16, 1998, when a violent thunderstorm ruptured the balloon envelope, causing him to fall 29,000 feet into the Coral Sea, 500 miles east of Australia. Search-and-rescue forces picked Fossett up after he floated for 23 hours in a raft.

Steve Fossett Round the World effortsAttempt Dates, Launch, Recovery, Results
Jan 8–11, 1996	Stratobowl, South Dakota	St. John, Canada	covered 2,200 statute miles (3540 km)	Balloon: Solo Challenger				
Jan 13–20, 1997	St. Louis, Missouri	Sultanpur	covered 10,360.61 statute miles (16673 km) World Distance Record	World Duration Record 6 days 2 hours 44 minutes	Balloon: Solo Spirit			
Jan 1–5, 1998	St. Louis, Missouri	Grechanaya, Russia	covered 5,802.94 statute miles (9338 km)	Balloon: Solo Spirit				
Aug 7–16, 1998	Mendoza, Argentina	the Coral Sea	covered 14,235.33 statute miles (22,910 km) World Distance Record	Balloon: Solo Spirit				
Aug 5–17, 2001	Northam, Western Australia	Bage, Brazil	covered 3,186.80 statute miles (5,128.65 km)	12 days 12 hours 57 minutes	Balloon: Solo Spirit			
Jul 1–4, 2002	Northam, Western Australia	Queensland, Australia	covered 20,482.26 statute miles (32,963 km)	13 days 12 hours 5 minutes (14 days 19 hours 50 minutes to landing)	First Solo RTW Flight	24 Hour Balloon Distance Record (Jun 30 - Jul 1. 2002)	Jul 1, 2002; Fastest Speed by Manned Balloon 200.24 mph (322.25 kmh)	Balloon: Spirit of Freedom

== See also ==
- List of circumnavigations
- National Air and Space Museum
- Steve Fossett
- Timeline of hydrogen technologies
- List of firsts in aviation

Further reading

- Fossett, Steve; Hasley, Will (2006). Chasing the Wind: The Autobiography of Steve Fossett. Virgin Books. ISBN 978-1-85227-234-0.
