= Charles Clifford Ogle =

American soldier and businessman

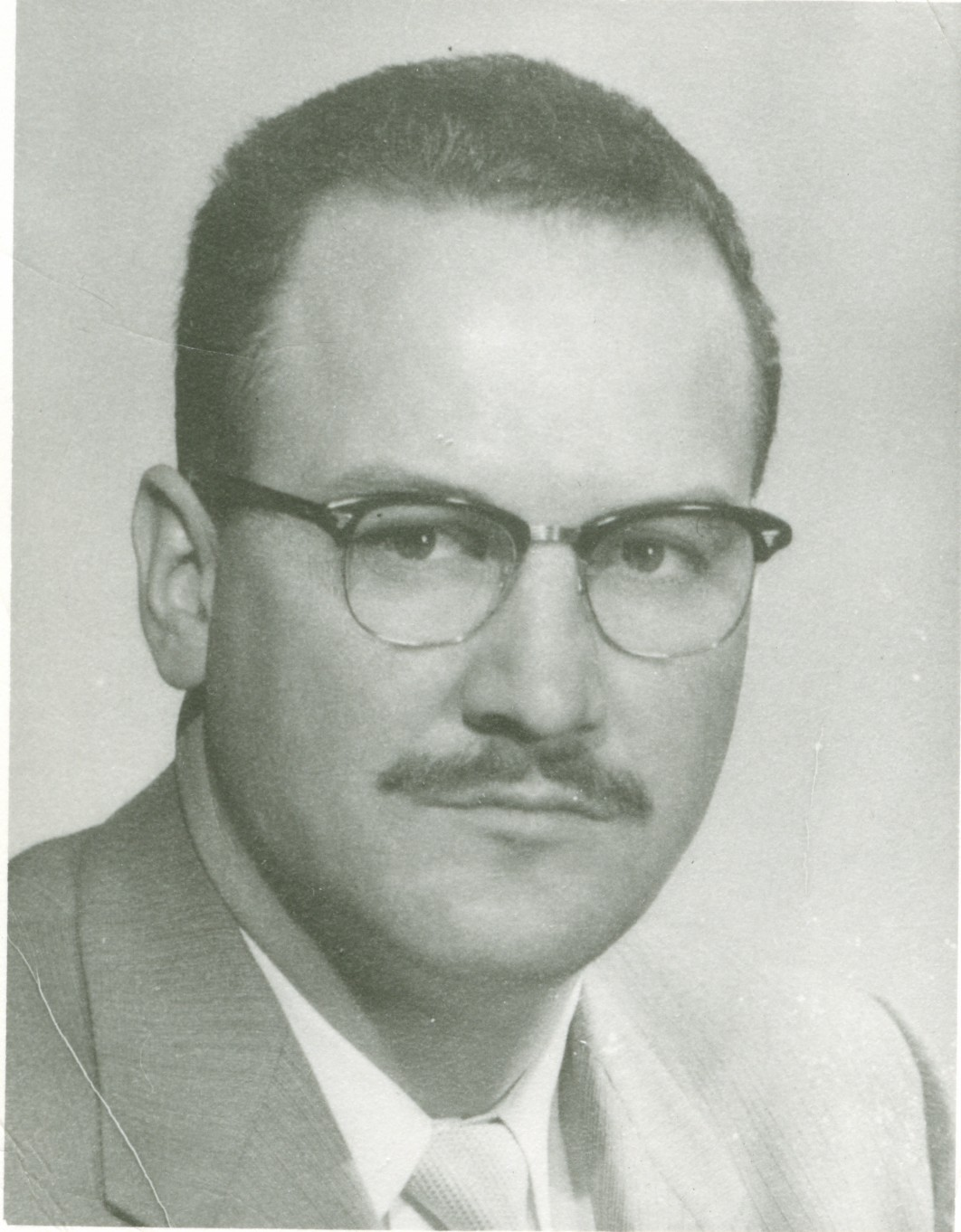
- Charles C. Ogle 1963
- Born: Charles Clifford Ogle; January 21, 1923; Sullivan, Indiana
- Disappeared: August 12, 1964 (aged 41); Sierra Nevada Mountains, California
- Status: Missing for 61 years, 5 months and 20 days
- Known for: Business

Charles Clifford Ogle (January 21, 1923 – c. August 12, 1964?) was a businessman and developer in San Francisco and Oakland, California, at the time of his disappearance.

== Career ==
He had worked as a loftsman for the Tampa Shipbuilding Company in Tampa, Florida, before joining the United States Navy in 1943 during World War II, where he received flight training in the CAA-WTS (Civil Aeronautics Administrative War Training Service). He also served on the USS John D. Ford. At the end of the war he worked as a securities salesman for the First California Company in Sacramento until 1950, when he joined the United States Marine Corps at the beginning of the Korean War. He rose to the rank of acting First Sergeant, Headquarters Battery 2nd Battalion, 11th Marines while serving in South and Central Korea. On discharge from the Marine Corps he settled in the San Francisco Bay Area, where he was a developer and builder from 1954 until his disappearance in 1964.

== Disappearance ==
At 6 pm on August 12, 1964, Charles Ogle took off from Oakland International Airport in his Cessna 210A, tail number N9492X. He did not file a flight plan and did not radio the tower on takeoff. He was never seen or heard from again. It was originally reported that his planned flight destination was Reno, Nevada. A private investigator hired by his father later reported his actual destination was Las Vegas, Nevada.

In 2007, during the massive search for a missing aircraft flown by wealthy adventurer Steve Fossett, eight unidentified plane wrecks were initially reported. It was later determined that some of these were double-counted and that there were only three newly reported wrecks. It was speculated that one of these aircraft could be the Cessna 210A that Charles Ogle had been flying, or one of several other aircraft that had disappeared over the Sierra Nevada. Though the remains of Fossett and his aircraft were identified in 2008, only one of the other wrecks was partially identified. No follow-up on the remaining wrecks was reported. The fate of Charles Ogle remains a mystery.

== See also ==
- List of people who disappeared
