= Tim Cole (balloonist) =

American balloonist (born 1945)

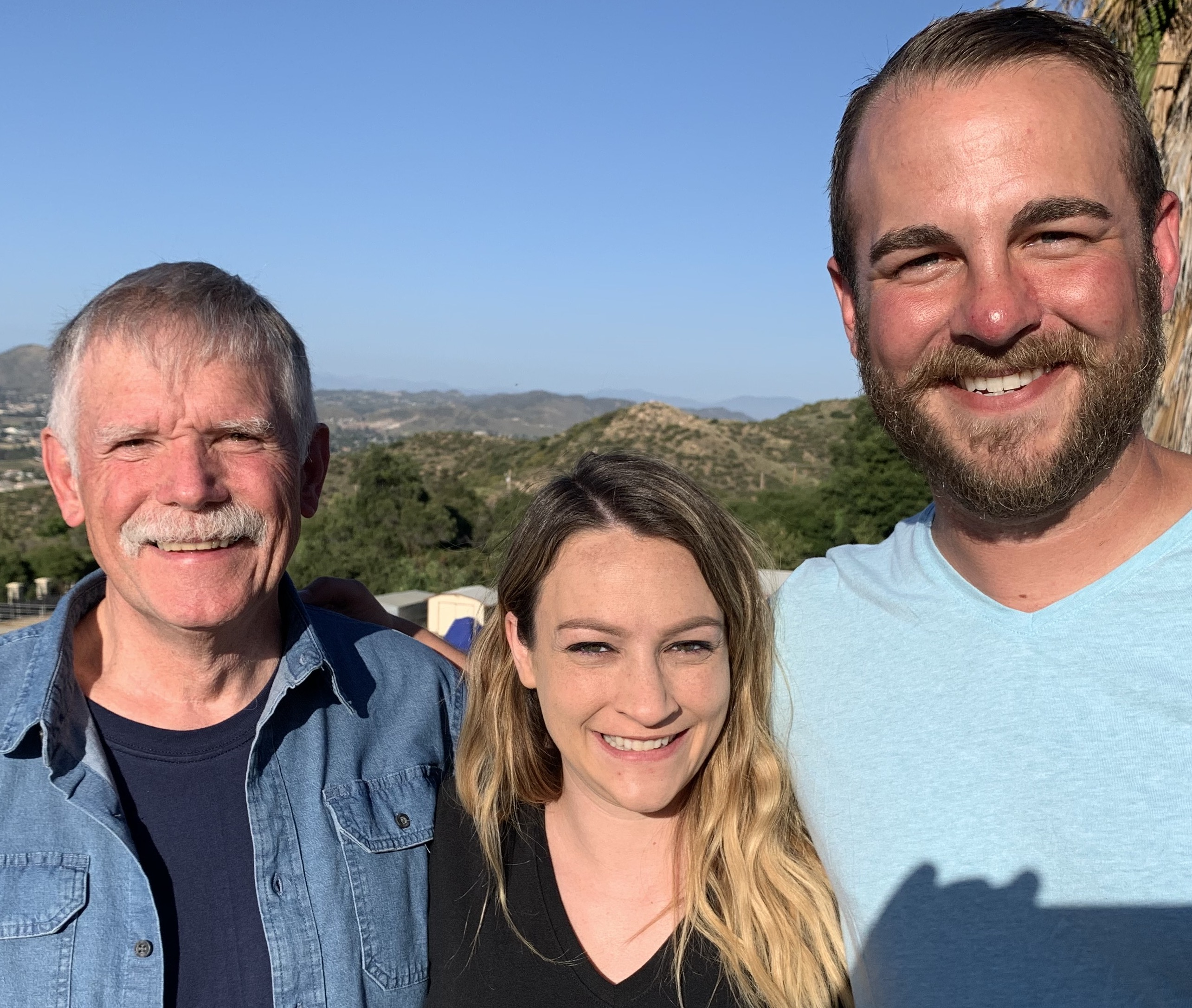
- Cole with son Tim Jr and daughter in law expecting Tim Cole III
- Born: Timothy Scot Cole; 11 November 1945 (age 80); Sarasota, Florida, U.S
- Occupation: Insurance agency owner
- Employer: Mountain Storm Insurance
- Known for: Spirit of Freedom (balloon); Steve Fossett's Project Director
- Spouse: Vikki
- Children: 2
- Awards: FAI Diplome Montgolfier ballooning's highest honor Fellow of the Explorers Club of New York

Timothy Scot Cole (born 11 November 1945) is the balloonist who designed and built the Spirit of Freedom balloon capsule. This was the first aircraft of any type to carry a solo pilot around the world. In 2002 pilot Steve Fossett flew the Spirit of Freedom on the first successful nonstop solo circumnavigation flight.

== Life and career ==
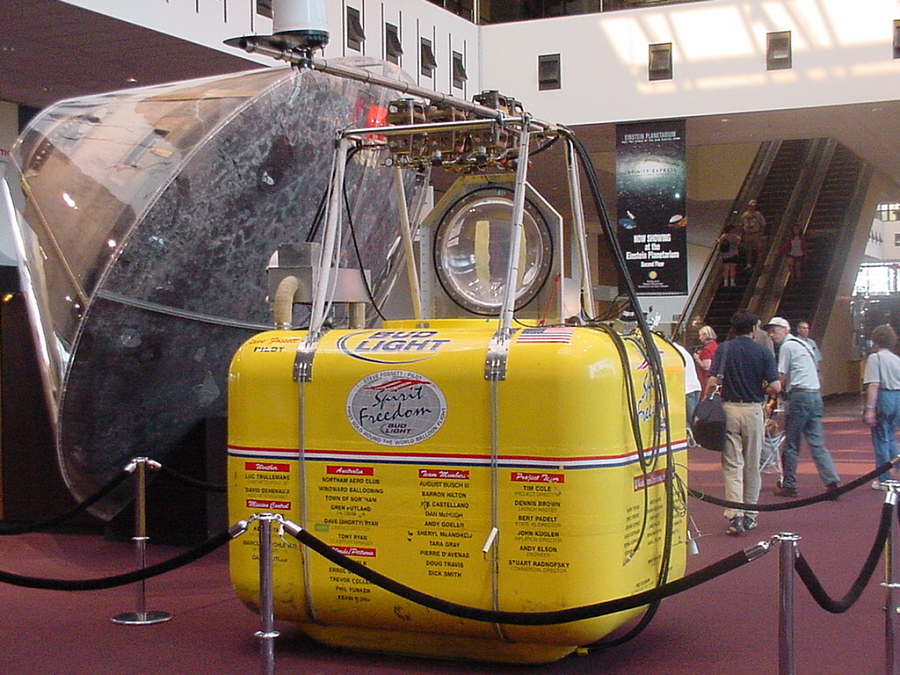
Steve Fossett & Spirit-of Freedom gondola

Born Timothy Scot Cole on November 11, 1945, in Sarasota, Florida. Became a lifelong Colorado resident after moving there at age 15, he lives in Greeley, Colorado with his wife Vikki. They have twin children Timothy and Elizabeth.

Cole started as an aviator by enlisting in the US Army where he was an honor graduate at helicopter flight training. He has over 1500 flying hours in rotary winged aircraft. From 1968 to 1969, he flew helicopters in combat during the Vietnam War, later becoming an instructor. Cole's first hot air balloon solo was in July 1978 at Frederick, Colorado. He has flown over 1000 hours in hot air, helium, and ammonia gas balloons. Cole's FAA commercial pilot unrestricted Lighter than Air certificate is complemented by his inspector/repairman expertise with a FAA airframe and power plant (A&P) certification.

Tim Cole with John Kugler and Dennis Brown pioneered balloon design using the inexpensive, agricultural gas anhydrous ammonia. This lifting gas is an economical alternative to helium. From Greeley, Colorado, Cole made a world-record solo duration flight in an ammonia gas balloon on September 26, 1991; the National Aeronautics Association declared it one of ten most important flights that year.

In 1993, Steve Fossett reached out to Tim Cole for balloon flying lessons. The following year in August 1994, Cole copiloted Fossett's first major balloon flight across the Atlantic Ocean. They launched from Canada and landed in Hamburg, Germany on August 21, flying over 75 hours and 4351 km (2703 sm). At that time, no manned balloon had ever flown more than 6 days or 5000 miles. He was on the team for Fossett"s around the world attempts in 1997 and 1998. Tim Cole designed and built the Spirit of Freedom capsule and was the Project Director of the Spirit of Freedom flight in 2002. The Spirit of Freedom was the first aircraft of any type to carry a solo pilot around the world. In 2002 pilot Steve Fossett flew the Spirit of Freedom on the first successful nonstop solo circumnavigation flight.

On March 23, 2004, Cole was the flight director for David Hempleman-Adams during his balloon world altitude record of 43,000 feet, breaking Per Lindstrand's record set in November 1996.

Tim Cole was the flight director for the project Two Eagles Across the Pacific by Balloon for pilots Troy Bradley and Leonid Tiukhtyaev. Cole supervised system operational readiness, improvements, and design changes. On January 31, 2015, the Two Eagles flight surpassed the gas balloon records for distance set by the Double Eagle V and duration set by the Double Eagle II. The Two Eagles' distance was 6,646 mi (10,696 km) and the Two Eagles balloon stayed aloft for 160 hours, 38 minutes (6 days, 16 hours, 38 minutes).

In 1995, he was awarded the "Diplome Montgolfier," ballooning's highest honor, by the Balloon Federation of America and the Fédération Aéronautique Internationale (FAI). Cole holds two world and 26 national ballooning records and was inducted into the Colorado Aviation Hall of Fame.

In May 2020, he helped train his son Tim Jr. who gained his FAA private pilot Lighter than Air certificate.

=== Spirit of Freedom Capsule ===
Designed and built by Tim Cole out of kevlar and carbon with a clear bubble hatch. His local Greeley partners helped with materials and building including: Agland, Purdy-Minch Construction and Maxanns. About the size of a closet, the Spirit-of-Freedom capsule has a bench and a sleeping bag. Fossett averaged 4 hours of sleep per day in 45 minute naps. He ate military rations called MREs which were heated with water activated chemical heat packs. Fossett would have to regularly climb out into the sub-zero temperatures to change fuel tanks. Besides the Comstock autopilot, the gondola equipment included GPS, Inmarsat, and satellite phone backup for communications with Mission Control at Washington University in St. Louis. Fossett used radios for communications with air traffic control and other aircraft. An Emergency Position Indicating Rescue Beacon (EPIRB) was on board to aid search and rescue. The unpressurized gondola used lithium batteries to power the electronic equipment and a custom heater regulating the aircraft internal temperature between 4 and 21 C (38-72 F).

The Spirit of Freedom Capsule was displayed for some time under the Spirit of St. Louis in the National Air and Space Museum in Washington DC. Cole's great-great-great-great-grandfather, William Congreve, is in the same museum for designing a British military rocket.

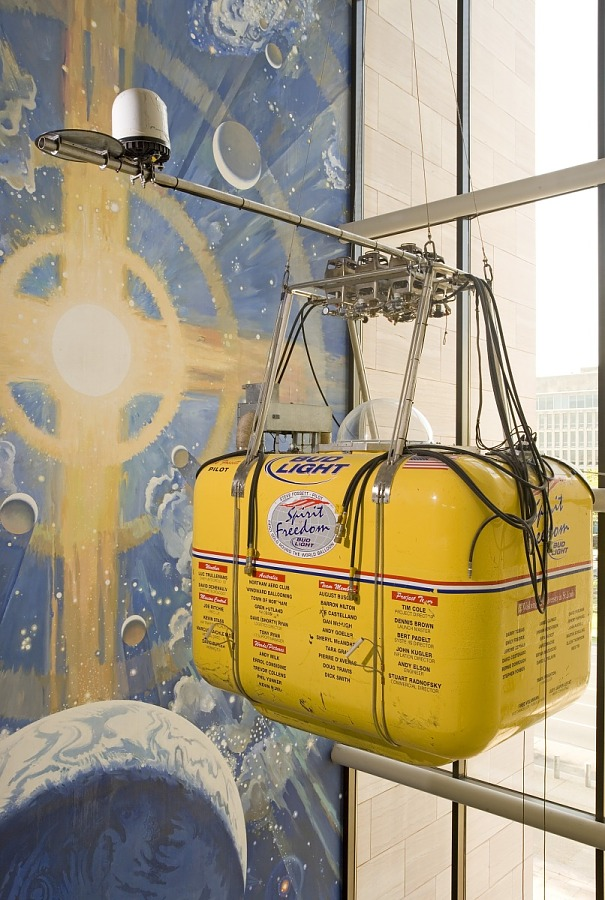
First Solo Around The World Balloon Flight Spirit-of-Freedom-Ballon gondola

=== Spirit of Freedom project team ===
- Tim Cole Project Director
- Dennis Brown Launch Master
- Bert Padelt Systems Director
- John Kugler Inflation Director
- Andy Elson Engineer
- Stuart Radnosfsky Commercial Director

== See also ==
- Two Eagles Balloon
- Double Eagle II
- Double Eagle V
- Spirit of Freedom (balloon)
- Steve Fossett
- Gas balloon
