= Brian Jones (aeronaut) =

English balloonist

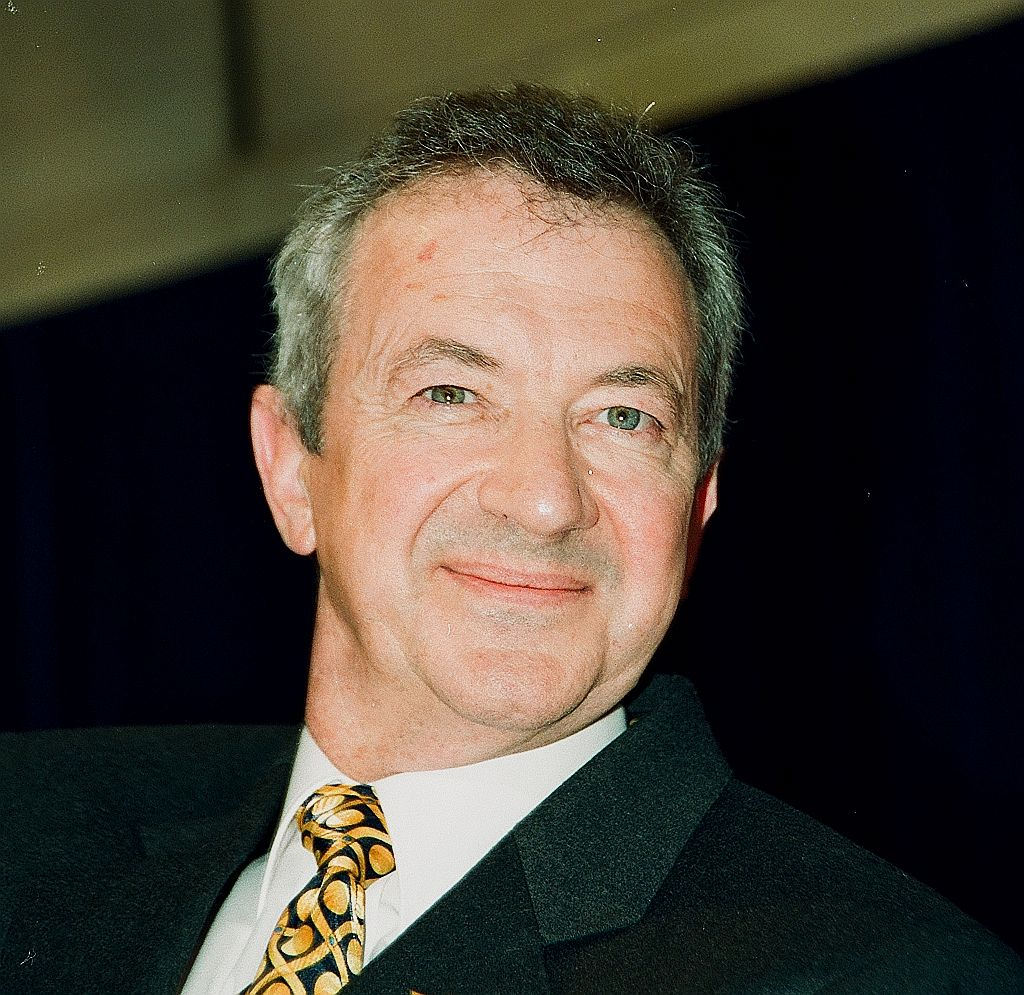
Brian Jones in 1999

Brian George Jones OBE (born 27 March 1947) is an English balloonist.

Brian Jones, along with Bertrand Piccard, co-piloted the first successful uninterrupted circumnavigation of the world on board a balloon, the Breitling Orbiter 3. They set off on 1 March 1999 from Château d'Oex in Switzerland and landed in Egypt after a 45,755-kilometre (28,431-mile) flight lasting 19 days, 21 hours and 47 minutes. For this achievement, he received awards including the Harmon Trophy, the Hubbard Medal, the FAI Gold Air Medal, the Charles Green Salver, the Golden Plate Award of the American Academy of Achievement, and was appointed an Officer of the Order of the British Empire (OBE) in the 1999 Birthday Honours for services to ballooning.

Still active in ballooning records, in November 2010 Jones piloted the Esprit Breitling Orbiter as a launch platform for Yves Rossy. Rossy made the first successful attempt to perform loops using a jet-powered flying-wing backpack.

Jones was born in Bristol, England, and grew up in Knowle, a suburb. He served for 13 years in the Royal Air Force. He is married to Joanna, a balloonist, and has two children.

== Notable work ==
He co-authored the book The Greatest Adventure ISBN 978-0747264439 with Bertrand Piccard.
