= Breitling Orbiter =

Series of hot air balloons

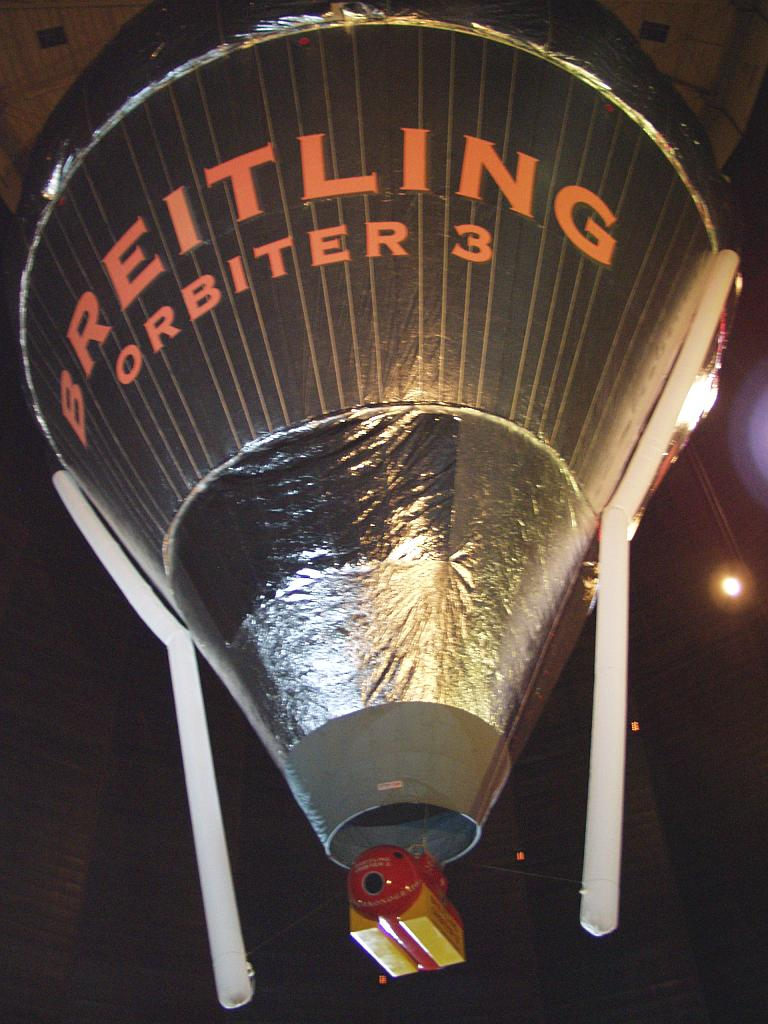
Spare envelope of the Breitling Orbiter 2 exhibited as Breitling Orbiter 3 at the Gasometer Oberhausen from 2004 to 2006

Breitling Orbiter was the name of three different Rozière balloons made by the Bristol-based balloon manufacturer Cameron Balloons to circumnavigate the globe, named after the Swiss watchmakers Breitling. The third was successful in March 1999 of making the first nonstop flight around the world by balloon. It was piloted by Bertrand Piccard and Brian Jones.

== Breitling Orbiter 3 ==
Breitling Orbiter 3
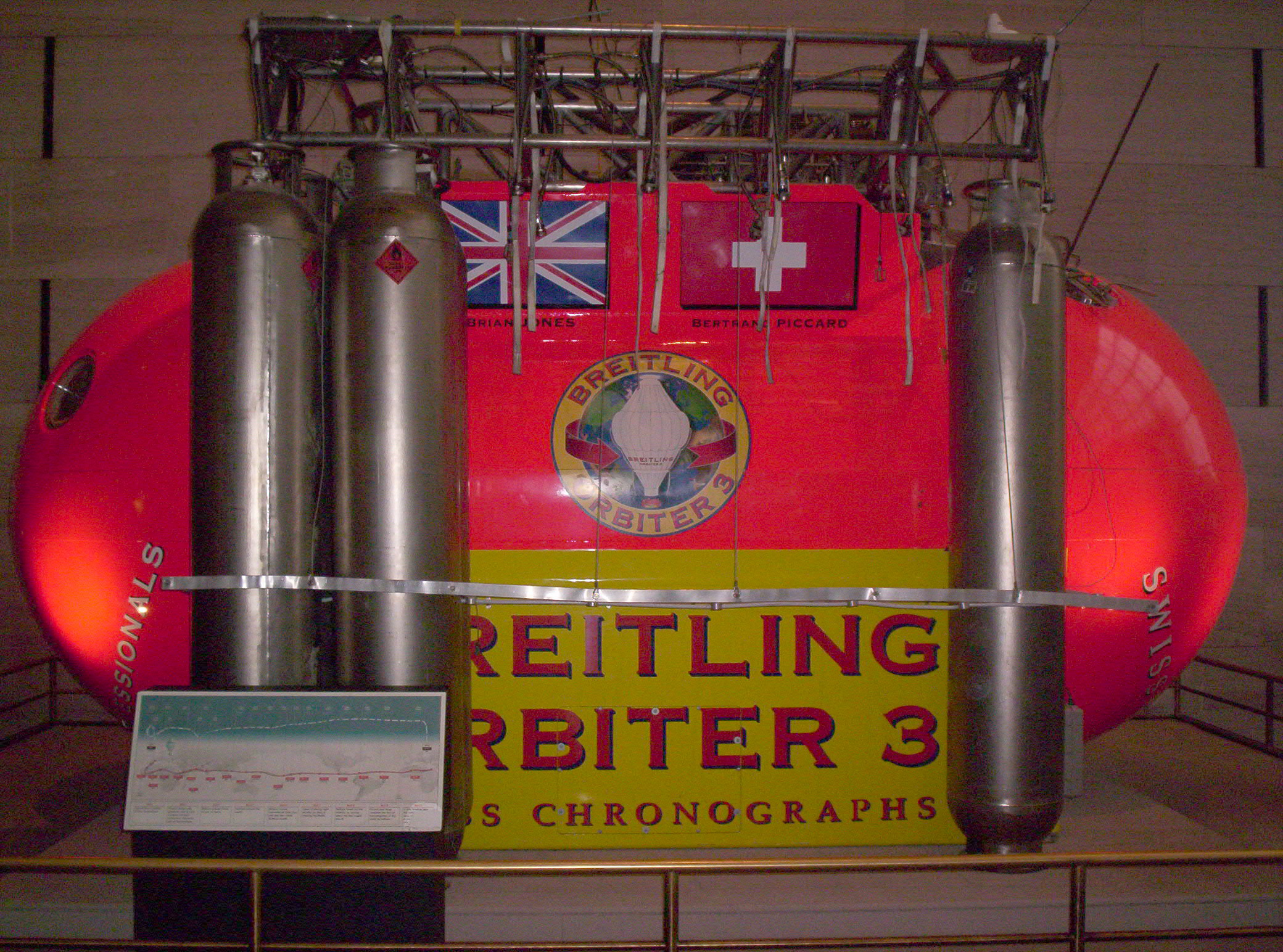
- Breitling Orbiter 3 gondola side view

Balloon
- Height: 180 ft (55 m) inflated
- Fuel: Propane
- Type: Rozier balloon
- Model: Cameron R-650

Gondola
- Height: 10 ft 3 in (3.1 m)
- Length: 17 ft 10 in (5.4 m)
- Weight: 4,400 lb (2,000 kg) empty
- Material: Kevlar and carbon fiber composite weave
- Cabin Air: nitrogen-oxygen mixture
- Cabin Pressure: 3.5 psi (24 kPa) at altitude
- Manufacturer: Cameron Balloons, 1998
- Location: Gondola: Udvar-Hazy Center, National Air and Space Museum, Dulles Airport outside Washington D.C.
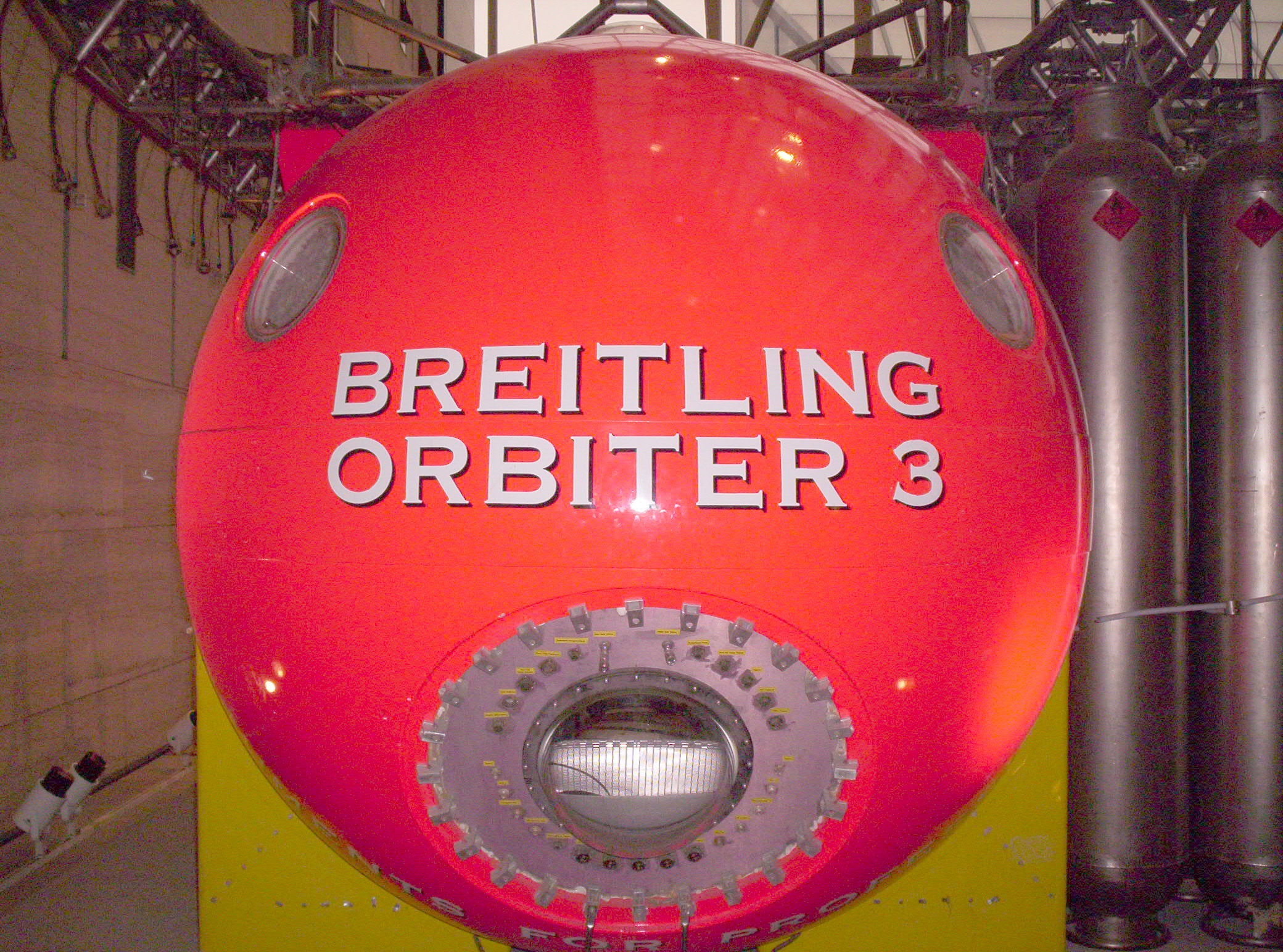
- Breitling Orbiter 3 gondola end view

Breitling Orbiter 3 was the first balloon to fly around the world non-stop, piloted by Bertrand Piccard and Brian Jones. Designed and built by Cameron Balloons, of Bristol, England, Breitling Orbiter 3 stood 180 ft (55 m) tall when inflated completely. The propane gas that fueled its six burners was contained in 28 titanium cylinders mounted in two rows along the sides of the gondola. Concerned about fuel consumption, the team added four additional propane containers prior to launch; these additions proved necessary to complete the trip. The Breitling Orbiter 3 held the record for the longest distance un-refuelled flight (25,360 mi (40,813 km)) of any aircraft in aviation history until the 2006 flight of the Virgin Atlantic GlobalFlyer. It still holds the record for the longest duration un-refuelled flight (19 days, 21 hours and 47 minutes).

The gondola is on display in the Udvar-Hazy Center at the National Air and Space Museum at Dulles Airport outside Washington, D.C. A model of the Orbiter 3 constructed with a spare Orbiter 2 envelope was exhibited at Gasometer Oberhausen from 2004 to 2006.

=== Balloon ===
The Breitling Orbiter 3 was a Cameron R-650 Rozière balloon, which combines the features of a hot-air balloon and a gas balloon, with a helium cell within a hot-air envelope. Initially, the helium cell is filled to approximately 47% of its maximum capacity. During ascent, warming by the sun causes the helium to expand even more than the surrounding air, which aids the balloon in gaining altitude (unlike the expansion caused by the drop in atmospheric pressure, which can even hinder that until the air and helium temperatures equalize).

=== Gondola ===
The Breitling Orbiter 3 gondola was constructed of a weave of Kevlar and carbon fiber material. After launching, the cabin was sealed at 6,000 ft (1,800 m) to trap the air within it. During the flight the cabin atmosphere was supplemented by nitrogen and oxygen; carbon dioxide was removed by lithium hydroxide filters. Cabin pressure was maintained at around 3.5 psi (24 kPa) by adding oxygen and nitrogen to the cabin air as necessary. At 33,000 ft (10,000 m), the cabin pressure equaled atmospheric pressure at 10,000 ft (3,000 m). Solar panels suspended beneath the gondola recharged the on-board lead-acid batteries that provided electrical power. Satellite-based systems enabled the crew to navigate via GPS as well as communicate.

=== Flight ===
Bertrand Piccard and Brian Jones launched from the Swiss Alpine village of Château-d'Oex at 8:05, GMT, March 1, 1999. They traveled southwest over the Mediterranean and then swung east over Mauritania on March 2 at a starting meridian of 9 degrees, 12 minutes west. They landed in the Egyptian desert after being aloft 19 days, 21 hours, and 55 minutes on March 21, 1999, having traveled a distance of 25,361 mi (40,814 km). During the course of the flight, the balloon had climbed to altitudes of up to 38,507 ft (11,737 m), and achieved speeds up to 123 knots (142 mph; 228 km/h). The official "finish line" of the circumnavigation occurred over Mauritania at 4:54 AM, EST on March 19. The goal of ending in Egypt had been to touch down near the Great Pyramids; however, high winds forced the pilots to land short of their target about 80 kilometers north of Mut. Aboard, they carried a copy of Guy de Maupassant's A Life, which had been inscribed by Maupassant to Jules Verne, who had imagined such a flight in his novel, Five Weeks in a Balloon. The book had been loaned to the pilots to carry for good luck by a grandson of Jules Verne from the novelist's personal library.

Jones noted Piccard's Geneva news conference remarks: "We took off as friends and landed as brothers."

The daily routine was for each man to spend eight hours alone at the controls, eight hours working with his crewmate, and eight hours in the single bunk. A unique pressure-operated toilet was included in a curtained off area at the rear of the craft. Despite the use of heaters designed to maintain a cabin temperature of 59 °F (15 °C), temperatures occasionally decreased so much at night that drinking water froze and ice had to be chipped away from delicate electronic circuitry on the interior walls.

When asked by reporter Howard Schneider about the fate of Breitling Orbiter 3, the project manager Alan Noble remarked that the sponsors and the team "...would probably donate the craft to a museum. Possibly the National Air and Space Museum or the Smithsonian." And indeed the gondola was located for several years on the ground floor of the National Air and Space Museum in the Milestones of Flight Gallery, next to the Wright Brothers 1903 Flyer, Charles Lindbergh's Spirit of St. Louis, the Mercury Friendship 7 capsule, the Gemini IV capsule, the Apollo 11 command module Columbia, and Space Ship One.

The gondola is now displayed at the Udvar-Hazy Center of the National Air and Space Museum, Dulles Airport outside Washington D.C.

== See also ==
- Solar Impulse
- List of circumnavigations
- National Air and Space Museum
