= Steve Fossett =

American businessman, aviator, sailor, and adventurer (1944–2007)

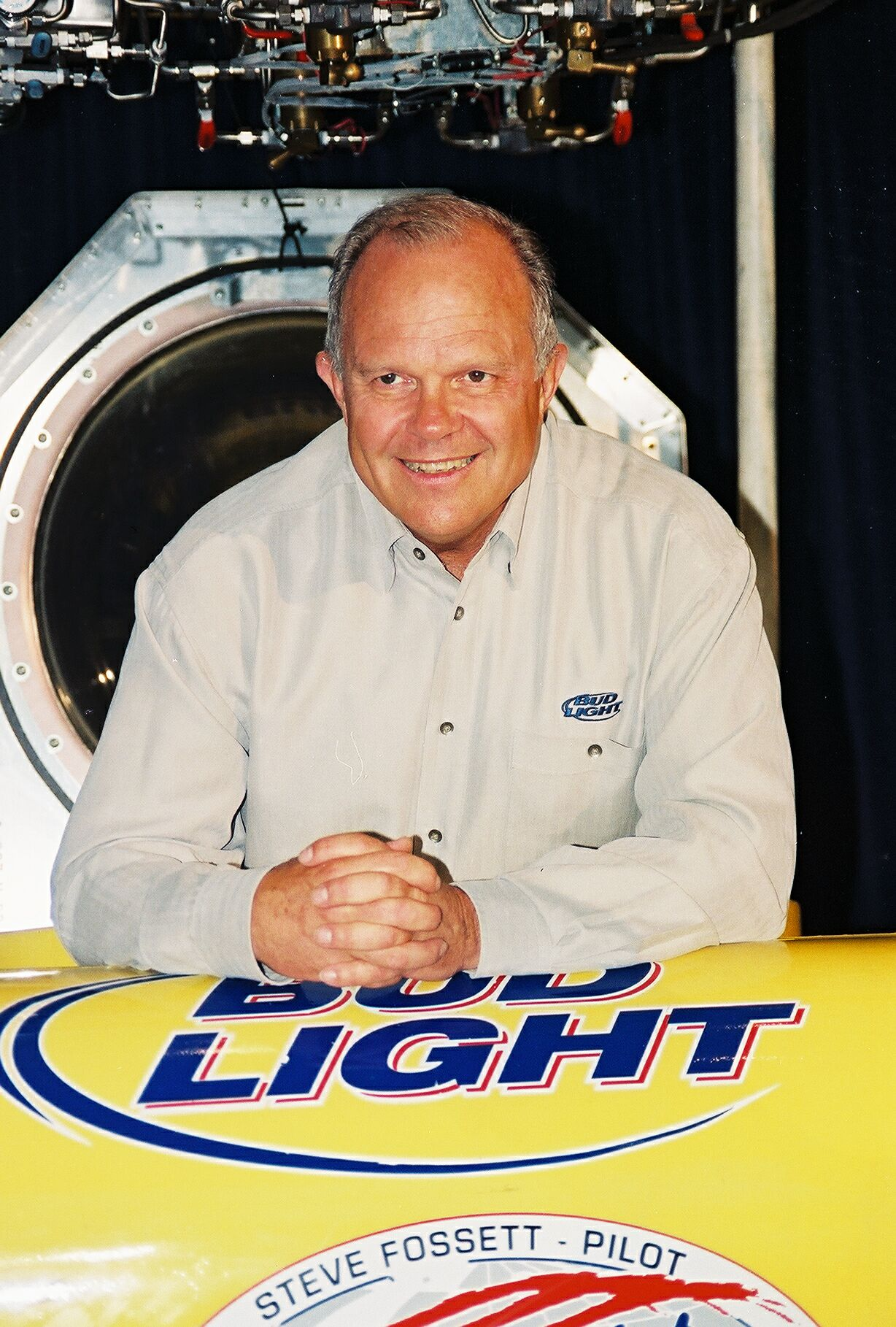
- Fossett in September 2002
- Born: James Stephen Fossett; April 22, 1944; Jackson, Tennessee, U.S.
- Died: September 3, 2007 (aged 63); Sierra Nevada Mountains, California, U.S.
- Cause of death: Plane crash
- Body discovered: October 29, 2008
- Education: Washington University in St. Louis (MBA); Stanford University (BA); Garden Grove High School
- Known for: Setting a large number of world records as an adventurer, sailor and aviator
- Spouse: Peggy Viehland

James Stephen Fossett (April 22, 1944 – September 3, 2007) was an American businessman and a record-setting aviator, sailor, and adventurer. He was the first person to fly solo nonstop around the world in a balloon and in a fixed-wing aircraft. He made his fortune in the financial services industry and held world records for five nonstop circumnavigations of the Earth: as a long-distance solo balloonist, as a sailor, and as a solo flight fixed-wing aircraft pilot.

A fellow of the Royal Geographical Society and the Explorers Club, Fossett set more than one hundred records in five different sports, sixty of which still stood at the time of his death. He broke three of the seven absolute world records for fixed-wing aircraft recognized by the Fédération Aéronautique Internationale, all in his Virgin Atlantic GlobalFlyer. In 2002, he was awarded the Gold Medal of the Royal Aero Club of the UK, and was inducted into the National Aviation Hall of Fame in 2007.

Fossett disappeared on September 3, 2007, while flying a light aircraft over the Great Basin Desert, between Nevada and California. Fossett's remains and plane were discovered in 2008.

== Early years ==
Fossett was born in Jackson, Tennessee and grew up in Garden Grove, California, where he graduated from Garden Grove High School.

Fossett's interest in adventure began early. As a Boy Scout, he grew up climbing the mountains of California, beginning with the San Jacinto Mountains. "When I was 12 years old I climbed my first mountain, and I just kept going, taking on more diverse and grander projects." Fossett said that he did not have a natural gift for athletics or team sports, so he focused on activities that required persistence and endurance. His father, an Eagle Scout, encouraged Fossett to pursue these types of adventures and encouraged him to become involved with the Boy Scouts early. He became an active member of Troop 170 in Orange, California. At age 13, Fossett earned the Boy Scouts' highest rank of Eagle Scout. He was a Vigil Honor member of the Order of the Arrow, the Boy Scouts' honor society, where he served as lodge chief. He also worked as a Ranger at Philmont Scout Ranch in New Mexico during the summer of 1961. Fossett said in 2006 that Scouting was the most important activity of his youth.

In college at Stanford University, Fossett was already known as an adventurer; his Sigma Alpha Epsilon fraternity brothers convinced him to swim to Alcatraz and raise a banner that read "Beat Cal" on the wall of the prison, closed two years previously. He made the swim but was thwarted by a security guard when he arrived. While at Stanford, Fossett was a student body officer and served as the president of a few clubs. In 1966, Fossett graduated from Stanford with a degree in economics. Fossett spent the following summer in Europe climbing mountains and swimming the Dardanelles.

== Business career ==
In 1968, Fossett received an MBA from the Olin School of Business at Washington University in St. Louis, Missouri, where he was later a longtime member of the Board of Trustees. Fossett's first job out of business school was with IBM; he then served as a consultant for Deloitte and Touche, and later accepted a job with Marshall Field's. Fossett later said, "For the first five years of my business career, I was distracted by being in computer systems, and then I became interested in financial markets. That's where I thrived."

Fossett then became a successful commodities salesman in Chicago, first for Merrill Lynch in 1973, where he proved a highly successful producer of commission revenue for himself and that firm. He began working in 1976 for Drexel Burnham, which assigned him one of its memberships on the Chicago Board of Trade and permitted him to market the services of the firm from a phone on the floor of that exchange. In 1980, Fossett began the process that eventually produced his enduring prosperity: renting exchange memberships to would-be floor traders, first on the Chicago Board Options Exchange.

After fifteen years of working for other companies, Fossett founded his own firms, Marathon Securities and Lakota Trading, from which he made millions renting exchange memberships. He founded Lakota Trading for that purpose in 1980. In the early 1980s, he founded Marathon Securities and extended that successful formula to memberships on the New York stock exchanges. He earned millions renting floor trading privileges (exchange memberships) to hopeful new floor traders, who also paid clearing fees to Fossett's clearing firms in proportion to the trading activity of those renting the memberships. In 1997, the trading volume of its rented memberships was larger than any other clearing firm on the Chicago exchange. Lakota Trading replicated that same business plan on many exchanges in the United States and also in London. Fossett later used those revenues to finance his adventures. Fossett said, "As a floor trader, I was very aggressive and worked hard. Those same traits help me in adventure sports."

Fossett said he did not participate in any of the "interesting things" he had done in college during his time in exchange-related activities: "There was a period of time where I wasn't doing anything except working for a living. I became very frustrated with that and finally made up my mind to start getting back into things." He began to take six weeks a year off to spend time on sports and moved to Beaver Creek, Colorado in 1990. Fossett later sold most of his business interests, although he maintained an office in Chicago until 2006.

== Personal life ==
In 1968, Fossett married Peggy Fossett (née Viehland), who was originally from Richmond Heights, Missouri. They had no children. The Fossetts had homes in Beaver Creek, Colorado and Chicago, and a vacation home in Carmel, California. Fossett was friends with billionaire Richard Branson, whose Virgin Group sponsored some of Fossett's adventures.

== Records ==
=== Overview ===
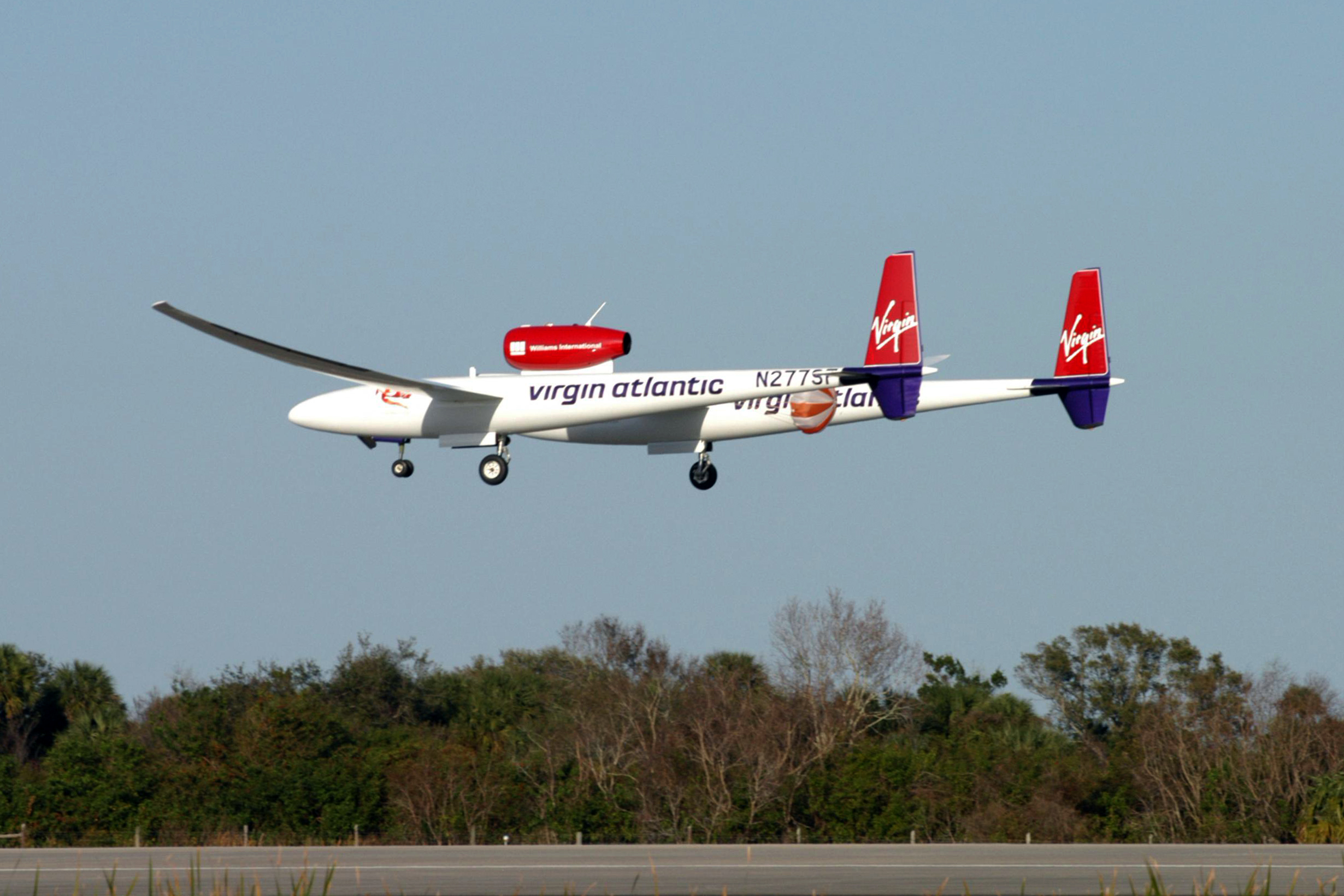
Virgin Atlantic GlobalFlyer arriving at Kennedy Space Center in 2006, piloted by Fossett

Fossett was well known for his world records and adventures in balloons, sailboats, gliders, and powered aircraft. He was an aviator of exceptional breadth of experience. He wanted to become the first person to achieve a solo balloon flight around the world (finally succeeding on his sixth attempt, in 2002, becoming the first person to complete an uninterrupted and unrefueled solo circumnavigation of the world in any kind of aircraft). He set, with co-pilot Terry Delore, 10 of the 21 Glider Open records, including the first 2,000 km Out-and-Return, the first 1,500 km Triangle and the longest Straight Distance flights. His achievements as a jet pilot in a Cessna Citation X include records for U.S. Transcontinental, Australia Transcontinental, and Round-the-World westbound non-supersonic flights. Prior to Fossett's aviation records, no pilot had held world records in more than one class of aircraft; Fossett held them in four classes.

In 2005, Fossett made the first solo, nonstop unrefueled circumnavigation of the world in an airplane, in 67 hours in the Virgin Atlantic GlobalFlyer, a single-engine jet aircraft.

In 2006, Fossett again circumnavigated the globe nonstop and unrefueled in 76 hours, 45 minutes in the GlobalFlyer, setting the record for the longest flight by any aircraft in history with a distance of 25,766 statute miles (41,467 km).

Fossett set 91 aviation world records ratified by Fédération Aéronautique Internationale, of which 36 stand, plus 23 sailing world records ratified by the World Sailing Speed Record Council.

On August 29, 2006, Fossett set the world altitude record for gliders over El Calafate, Argentina at 15,460 metres (50,720 ft).

=== Balloon pilot ===
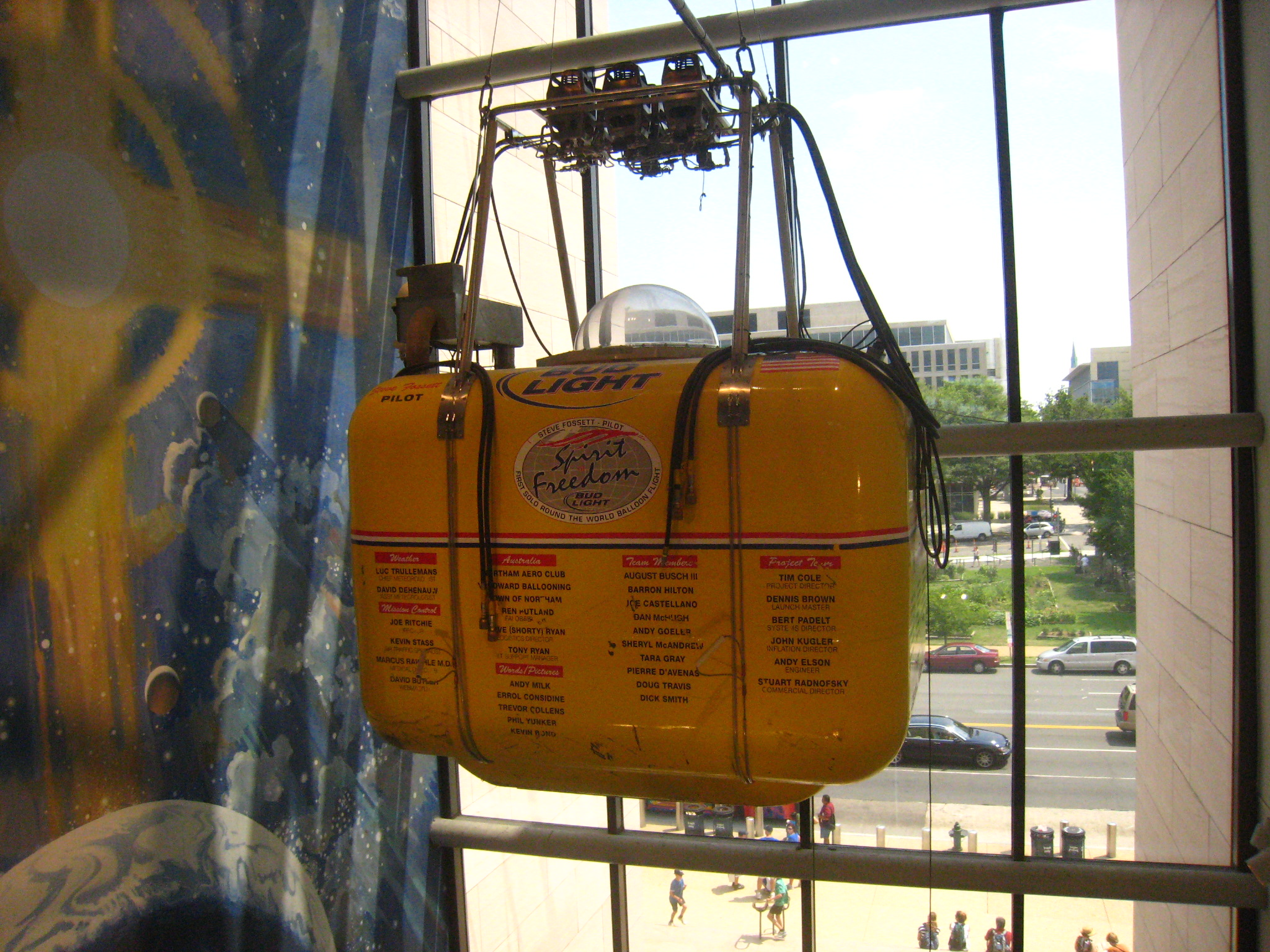
Spirit of Freedom balloon gondola on display at the National Air and Space Museum

On February 21, 1995, Fossett landed in Leader, Saskatchewan, Canada, after taking off from South Korea, becoming the first person to make a solo flight across the Pacific Ocean in a balloon.

In 2002, Fossett became the first person to fly around the world alone, nonstop in any kind of aircraft. He launched the 10-story high balloon Spirit of Freedom from Northam, Western Australia on June 19, 2002 and returned to Australia on July 3, 2002, subsequently landing in Queensland. Duration and distance of this solo balloon flight was 13 days, 8 hours, 33 minutes (14 days 19 hours 50 minutes to landing), 20,626.48 statute miles (33,195.10 km). The balloon dragged him along the ground for 20 minutes at the end of the flight. Only the capsule survived the landing; it was taken to the Smithsonian Institution in Washington, D.C., where it was displayed. The control center for the mission was in Brookings Hall at Washington University in St. Louis. Fossett's top speed during the flight was 186 miles per hour (299 km/h) over the Indian Ocean. The trip set a number of records for ballooning: Fastest (200 miles per hour (320 km/h), breaking his own previous record of 166 miles per hour (270 km/h)), Fastest Around the World (13.5 days), Longest Distance Flown Solo in a Balloon (20,482.26 miles (32,963.00 km)), and 24-Hour Balloon Distance (3,186.80 miles (5,128.66 km) on July 1).

While Fossett had financed five previous tries himself, his successful record-setting flight was sponsored by Bud Light. In the end, Fossett actually made money on all his balloon flights. He bought a contingency insurance policy for $500,000 that would pay him $3 million if he succeeded in the flight. Along with sponsorship, that payment meant that in the end Fossett did not have to spend any of his money other than for initial expenses.

=== Sailor ===
Fossett was one of sailing's most prolific distance record holders. Speed sailing was his specialty and from 1993 to 2004 he dominated the record sheets, setting 23 official world records and nine distance race records. He is recognized by the World Sailing Speed Record Council as "the world's most accomplished speed sailor".

On the maxi-catamaran Cheyenne (formerly named PlayStation), Fossett twice set the prestigious 24 Hour Record of Sailing. In October 2001, Fossett and his crew set a transatlantic record of 4 days 17 hours, shattering the previous record by 43 hours 35 minutes; an increase in average speed of nearly seven knots.

In early 2004, Fossett, as skipper, set the Around the world sailing record of 58 days, 9 hours in Cheyenne with a crew of 13. In 2007, Fossett held the world record for crossing the Pacific Ocean in his 125-foot (38 m) sailboat, the PlayStation, which he accomplished on his fourth try.

Complete Summary of Sailing Records

13 Outright World Records:

- Round Ireland 44 h 42 min 20 s Sep 1993
- Hawaii-Japan 13 d 20 h 9 min July-Aug 1995
- Pacific Ocean East to West 16 d 17 h 21 min Aug 1995
- Newport-Bermuda 1 d 14 h 35 min 53 s Jan 2000
- Miami-New York 2 d 5 h 54 min 42 s May 2001
- TransAtlantic 4 d 17 h 28 min 6 s (25.78 kn) Oct 2001
- Isle of Wight 2 h 33 min 55 s Nov 2001
- Fastnet Course 35 h 17 min 14 s Mar 2002
- Plymouth-LaRochelle 16 h 41 min 40 s Apr 2002
- TransMed (Marseilles-Carthage) 18 h 46 min 48 s May 2002
- Round Britain & Ireland 4 d 16 h 9 min 36 s Oct 2002
- TransAt-Discovery Route 9 d 13 h 30 min 18 s Feb 2003
- Round the World 58 d 9 h 32 min 45 s Feb-April 2004

2 Singlehanded World Records:

- Pacific Ocean (Yokohama-SF)-World 20 d 9 h 52 min Aug 1996
- Newport-Bermuda-World 40 h 51 min 54 s Jun 1999

9 Race Records:

- Long Beach-Cabo San Lucas 3 d 2 h 59 min Nov 1995
- Swiftsure 14 h 35 min 29 s May 1997
- Windjammers (SF-Santa Cruz) 4 h 41 min 2 s Aug 1997
- San Diego-Puerto Vallarta 62 h 20 min 11 s Feb 1998
- Newport-Ensenada 6 h 46 min 40 s (18.45 kn) Apr 1998
- Chicago-Mackinac 18 h 50 min 32 s Jul 1998
- Pineapple Cup (Ft Lauderdale-Montego Bay) 2 d 20 h 8 min 5 s Feb 1999
- Round St. Martin (Heineken) 2 h 4 min 23 s Mar 2003

Singlehanded Race Record:

- California-Hawaii (Singlehanded Transpac) – Race 7 d 22 h 38 min July 1998

World Records set but later beaten:

- Isle of Wight 3 h 35 min 38 s Sep 1994
- Round Britain & Ireland 5 d 21 h 5 min 27 s Oct 1994
- Transpac 6 d 16 h 7 min 16 s July 1995
- Pacific Ocean Record (Crewed) 16 d 17 h 21 min 19 s Aug 1995
- 24 Hour Record 580.23 nmi (24.18 kn) Mar 1999
- 24 Hour Record 687.17 nmi (28.63 kn) Oct 2001
- Cowes-St. Malo 6 h 21 min 54 s Dec 2001

At the time of his death a submarine, DeepFlight Challenger, was under construction to enable Fossett to be the first solo submariner to reach the Challenger Deep.

=== Airship pilot ===
Fossett set the Absolute World Speed Record for airships on October 27, 2004. The new record for fastest flight was accomplished with a Zeppelin NT, at a recorded average speed of 62.2 knots (115.2 km/h; 71.6 mph). The previous record was 50.1 knots (92.8 km/h; 57.7 mph) set in 2001 in a Virgin airship. In 2006, Fossett was one of only 17 pilots in the world licensed to fly the Zeppelin.

=== Fixed-wing aircraft pilot ===
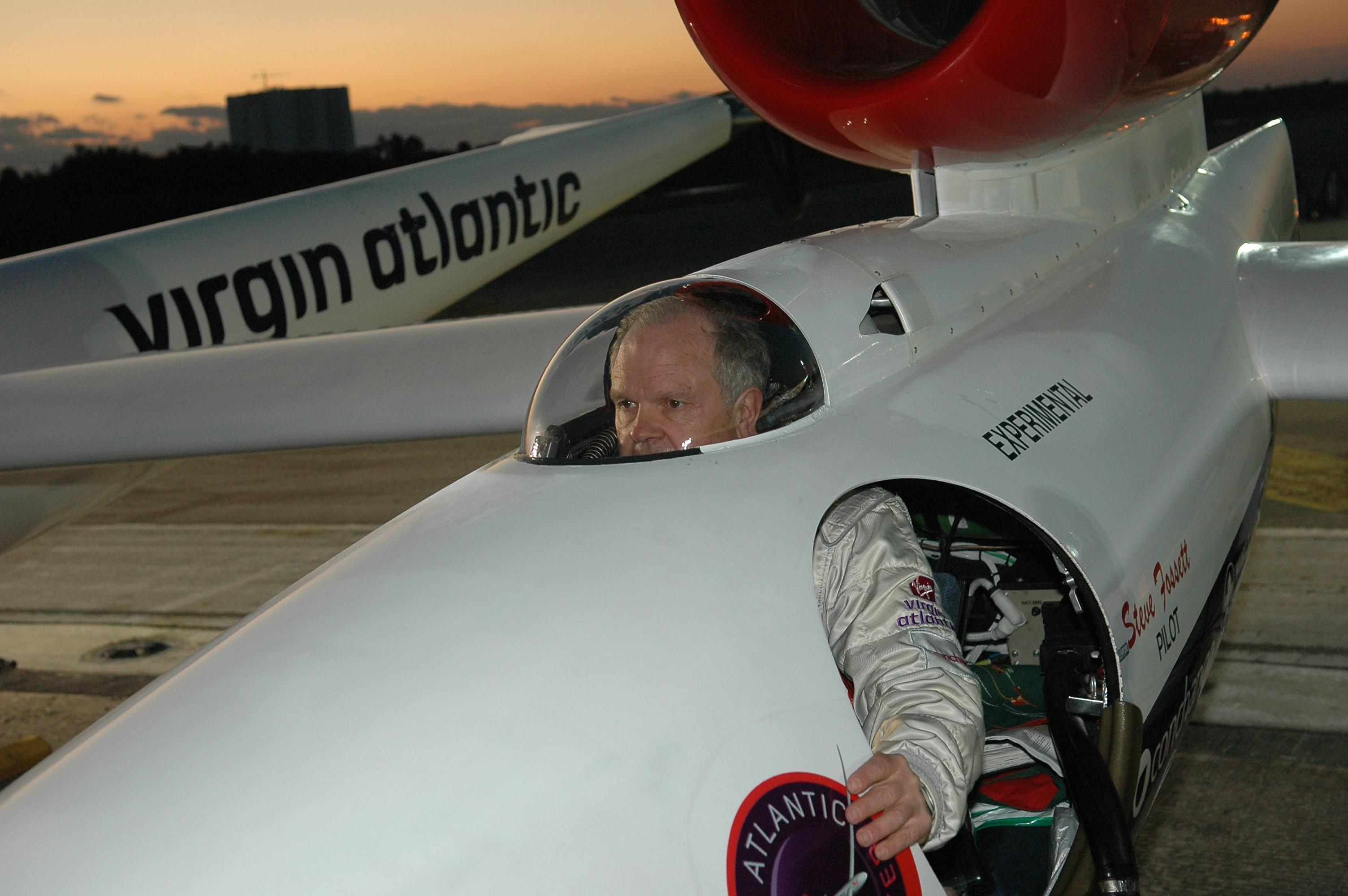
Fossett at NASA Kennedy Space Center's Shuttle Landing Facility seated in the GlobalFlyer cockpit

==== GlobalFlyer ====
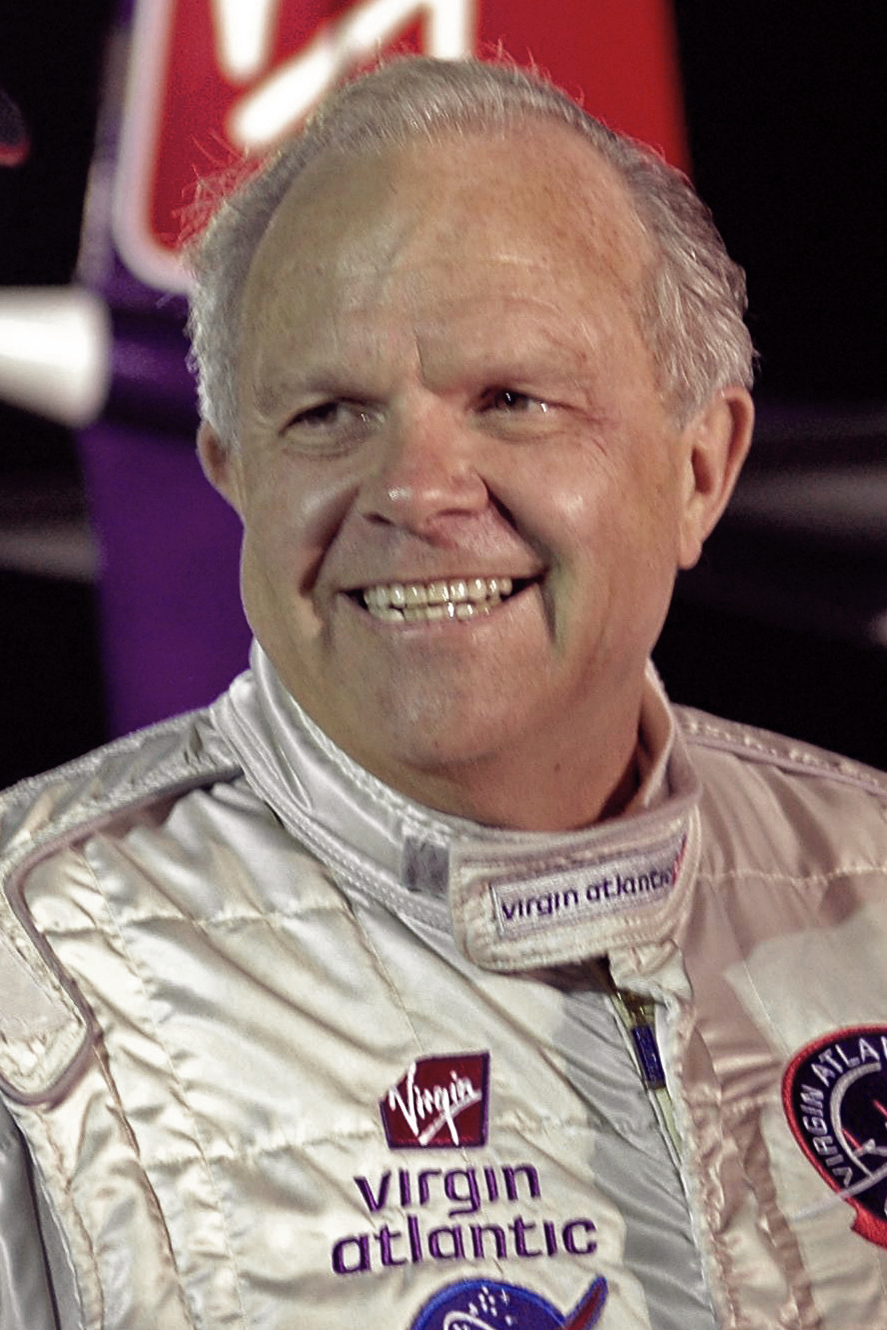
Fossett in 2006 before his record-breaking flight

Fossett made the first solo nonstop unrefueled fixed-wing aircraft flight around the world between February 28 and March 3, 2005. He took off from Salina, Kansas, where he was assisted by faculty members and students from Kansas State University, and flew eastbound with the prevailing winds, returning to Salina after 67 hours, 1 minute, 10 seconds, without refueling or making intermediate landings. His average speed of 342.2 mph (550.7 km/h) was also the absolute world record for "speed around the world, nonstop and non-refueled." His aircraft, the Virgin Atlantic GlobalFlyer, had a carbon fiber reinforced plastic airframe with a single Williams FJ44 turbofan engine. It was designed and built by Burt Rutan and his company, Scaled Composites, for long-distance solo flight. The fuel fraction, the weight of the fuel divided by the weight of the aircraft at take-off, was 83 percent.

On February 11, 2006, Fossett set the absolute world record for "distance without landing" by flying from the Kennedy Space Center, Florida, around the world eastbound, then upon returning to Florida continuing across the Atlantic a second time to land in Bournemouth, England. The official distance was 25,766 statute miles (41,467 km) and the duration was 76 hours 45 minutes.

The next month, Fossett made a third flight around the world in order to break the absolute record for "Distance over a closed circuit without landing" (with takeoff and landing at the same airport). He took off from Salina, Kansas on March 14, 2006 and returned on March 17, 2006 after flying 25,262 statute miles (40,655 km).

There are only seven absolute world records for fixed-wing aircraft recognized by the Fédération Aéronautique Internationale and Fossett broke three of them in the Virgin Atlantic GlobalFlyer. All three records were previously held by Dick Rutan and Jeana Yeager from their flight in the Voyager in 1986. Fossett contributed the GlobalFlyer to the Smithsonian Institution's permanent collection. It is on display at the Udvar-Hazy Center of the Smithsonian's National Air and Space Museum. Fossett flew the plane to the Center and taxied the plane to the front door.

==== Transcontinental aircraft records ====
Fossett set two U.S. transcontinental fixed-wing aircraft records in the same day. On February 5, 2003, Fossett and co-pilot Doug Travis flew his Cessna Citation X jet from San Diego, California to Charleston, South Carolina in 2 hours, 56 minutes, 20 seconds, at an average speed of 726.83 mph (1,169.72 km/h) to smash the transcontinental record for non-supersonic jets.

Fossett returned to San Diego, then flew the same course as co-pilot for fellow adventurer Joe Ritchie in Ritchie's turboprop Piaggio Avanti. Their time was 3 hours, 51 minutes, 52 seconds, an average speed of 546.44 mph (879.41 km/h), which broke the previous turboprop transcontinental record held by Chuck Yeager and Renald Davenport.

Fossett also set the east-to-west transcontinental record for non-supersonic fixed-wing aircraft on September 17, 2000. He flew from Jacksonville, Florida to San Diego, California in 3 hours, 29 minutes, at an average speed of 591.96 mph (952.67 km/h).

==== First trans-Atlantic flight re-enactment ====
On July 2, 2005, Fossett and co-pilot Mark Rebholz recreated the first nonstop crossing of the Atlantic which was made by the British team of John Alcock and Arthur Whitten Brown in June 1919 in a Vickers Vimy biplane. Their flight from St. John's, Newfoundland, Canada to Clifden, County Galway, Ireland in the open cockpit Vickers Vimy replica took 18 hours 25 minutes with 13 hours flown in instrument flight conditions. Because there was no airport in Clifden, Fossett and Rebholz landed on the 8th fairway of the Connemara Golf Links.

==== Glider records ====
The team of Steve Fossett and Terry Delore (NZ) set ten official world records in gliders while flying in three major locations: New Zealand, Argentina, and Nevada, United States. An asterisk (*) indicates records subsequently broken by other pilots.

- 1,000 km Out-and-Return World Record* 166.46 km/h (103.43 mph), December 12, 2002.
- 750 Kilometer Triangle World Record* 171.29 km/h (106.43 mph), July 29, 2003.
- 1,250 Kilometer Triangle U.S. National Record 143.48 km/h (89.15 mph), July 30, 2003. Exceeded world record by 0.01 km/h.
- 1,500 km Out-and-Return World Record* 156.61 km/h (97.31 mph), November 14, 2003.
- Out-and-Return Distance (Declared) World Record* 1,804.7 km, November 14, 2003.
- Out and Return Distance (Free) World Record* 2,002.44 km, November 14, 2003.
- 500 Kilometer Triangle World Record* 187.12 km/h (116.27 mph), November 15, 2003.
- 1,500 Kilometer Triangle World Record 119.11 km/h (74.01 mph), December 13, 2003.
- Triangle Distance (Declared) World Record* 1,502.6 km, December 13, 2003.
- Triangle Distance (Free) World Record* 1,509.7 km, December 13, 2003.
- Distance (Free) World Record 2,192.9 km, December 4, 2004.

Fossett and co-pilot Einar Enevoldson flew a glider into the stratosphere on August 29, 2006. The flight set the Absolute Altitude Record for gliders at 15,460 metres (50,720 ft). Since the glider cockpit was unpressurized, the pilots wore full pressure suits (similar to space suits) so that they would be able to fly to altitudes above 45,000 feet (14,000 m). Fossett and Enevoldson had made previous attempts in three countries over a period of five years before finally succeeding with this record flight. This endeavor is known as the Perlan Project.

=== Cross-country skiing ===
As a young adventurer, Fossett was one of the first participants in the Worldloppet, a series of cross-country ski marathons around the world. While he had little experience as a skier, he was in the first group of 'citizen athletes' to participate in the series debut in 1979. And in 1980, he became the eighth skier to complete all 10 of the long distance races, earning a Worldloppet medallion. He has also set cross-country skiing records in Colorado, setting an Aspen to Vail record of 59 h, 53 min, 30 s in February 1998, and an Aspen to Eagle record of 12 hr, 29 min in February 2001.

=== Mountain climbing ===
Fossett was a lifelong mountain climber and had climbed the highest peaks on six of the seven continents. In the 1980s, he became friends with Patrick Morrow, who was attempting to climb the highest peaks on all seven continents for the "Seven Summits" world record, which Morrow achieved in 1985. Fossett accompanied Morrow for his last three peaks, including Vinson Massif in Antarctica, Carstensz Pyramid in Oceania, and Elbrus in Europe. While Fossett went on to climb almost all of the Seven Summits peaks himself, he declined to climb Mount Everest in 1992 due to asthma. He later returned to Antarctica to climb again.

=== Other accomplishments ===
Fossett competed in and completed premier endurance sports events, including the 1,165-mile (1,875 km) Iditarod Trail Sled Dog Race, in which he finished 47th on his second try in 1992 after training for five years. He became the 270th person to swim across the English Channel on his fourth try in September 1985 with a time of 22 hours, 15 minutes. Although Fossett said he was not a good enough swimmer "to make the varsity swim team", he found that he could swim for long periods. Fossett competed in the Ironman Triathlon in Hawaii (finishing in 1996 in 15:53:10), the Boston Marathon, and the Leadville Trail 100, a 100-mile (160 km) Colorado ultramarathon which involves running up to elevations of more than 12,600 feet (3,800 m) in the Rocky Mountains.

Fossett raced cars in the mid-1970s and later returned to the sport in the 1990s. He competed in the 24 hours of Le Mans road race in 1993 and in 1996, along with the Dakar Rally.

==== 24 Hours of Le Mans results ====
Year	Team	Co-drivers	Car	Class	Laps	Pos.	Class pos.
1993	(Germany) Porsche Kremer Racing	(Italy) Almo Coppelli (United Kingdom) Robin Donovan	Porsche 962CK6	C2	204	DNF	DNF
1996	(Germany) Kremer Racing	(South Africa) George Fouché (Sweden) Stanley Dickens	Kremer K8 Spyder	LMP1	58	DNF	DNF

=== Previous attempts at records ===
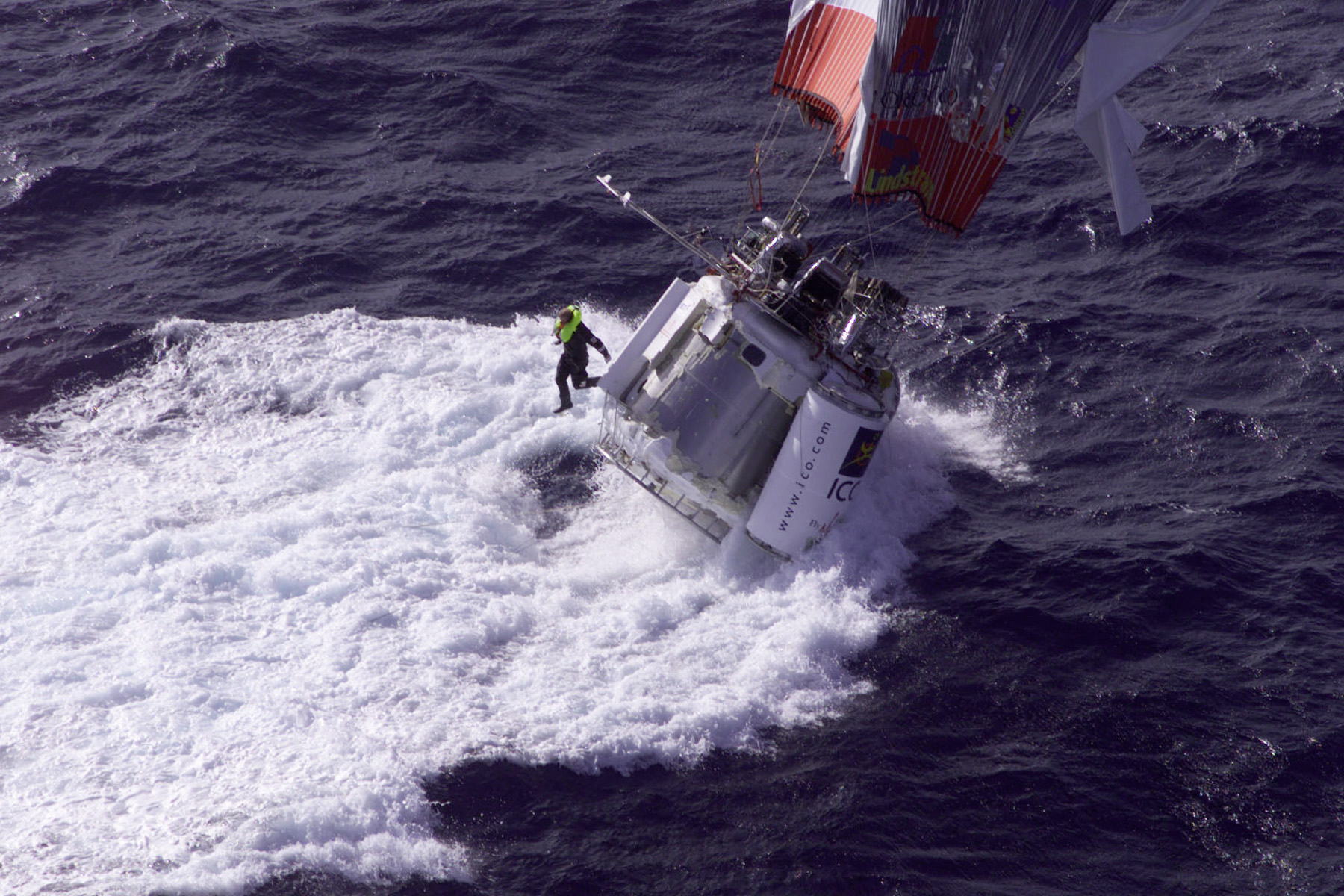
A 1998 attempt at an around-the-world balloon flight by Fossett, Richard Branson and Per Lindstrand ends in the Pacific Ocean on December 25

Fossett tried six times over seven years for the first solo balloon circumnavigation. His fifth attempt cost him $1.25 million of his own money; his sixth and successful attempt was commercially sponsored. Two of the attempts were launched from Busch Memorial Stadium in St. Louis, Missouri. Washington University in St. Louis served as control center for four of the six flights, including the record-breaking one.

In 1998, one of the unsuccessful attempts at the ballooning record ended with a five-mile (8 km) plummet into the Coral Sea off the coast of Australia that nearly killed Fossett; he waited 72 hours to be rescued, at a cost of $500,000. The first attempt began in the Black Hills of South Dakota and ended outside Hampton, New Brunswick 1,800 miles (2,900 km) later. The second attempt, launched from Busch Stadium, cost $300,000 and lasted 9,600 miles (15,400 km) before being downed halfway in a tree in India; the trip set records at the time for duration and distance of flight (with Fossett doubling his own previous record) and was called Solo Spirit after Lindbergh's Spirit of St. Louis. Fossett slept an average of two hours a night for the six-day journey, conducted in below-zero temperatures. After taking too much fuel to cross the Atlantic Ocean and circling Libya for 12 hours while officials decided whether or not to allow him into their airspace, Fossett did not have enough fuel to finish the flight. That year, Fossett flew farther for less money than better-financed expeditions (including one supported by Virgin Galactic founder Richard Branson) in part due to his ability to fly in an unpressurized capsule, a result of his heavy physical training at high altitudes. The Solo Spirit capsule was put on display at the Smithsonian's National Air and Space Museum across from the Apollo 11 command module.

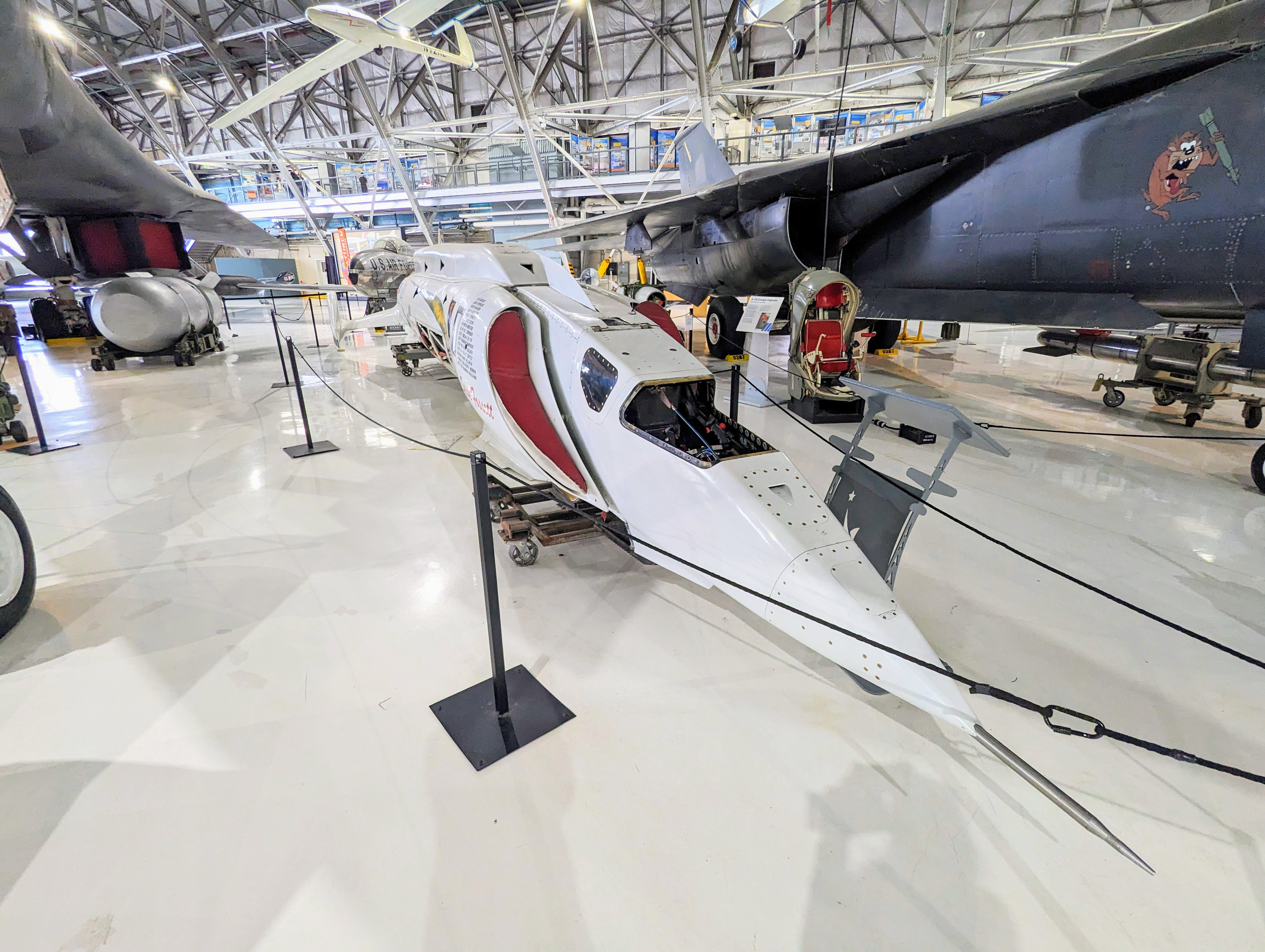
Spirit of America Sonic Arrow at Wings Over the Rockies

In 2006, Fossett purchased the Formula Shell LSRV Spirit of America from former land speed record holder Craig Breedlove. He rechristened the vehicle the Spirit of America Sonic Arrow and set about making improvements to the vehicle to break the land speed record. Fossett was initially unable to break even 675 miles per hour (1,086 km/h) with the vehicle but eventually hoped to raise its top speed to 800 miles per hour (1,300 km/h) and even 900 miles per hour (1,400 km/h). After his disappearance and death, his team's efforts continued until 2008. The vehicle was put up for auction in 2010.

== Scouting ==
Fossett grew up in Garden Grove, California and earned the Eagle Scout award in 1957. He credited his experience in Scouting as a foundation for much of his later success. "As a Scout, I learned how to set goals and achieve them," he once said. "Being a Scout also taught me leadership at a young age when there are few opportunities to be a leader. Scouting values have remained with me throughout my life, in my business career, and now as I take on new challenges." In his later years, he was described as a "legend" by fellow Scouts. As a national BSA volunteer, he served as Chairman of the Northern Tier High Adventure Committee, Chairman of the Venturing Committee, member of the Philmont Ranch Committee, and member of the National Advisory Council. He later became a member of the BSA National Executive Board, and in 2007, Fossett succeeded Secretary of Defense Robert Gates as president of the National Eagle Scout Association. Fossett previously had served on the World Scout Committee.

Fossett was honored with the Distinguished Eagle Scout Award in 1992. In 1999, he received the Silver Buffalo Award, BSA's highest recognition of service to youth.

== Awards and honors ==
In 2002, Fossett received aviation's highest award, the Gold Medal of the Fédération Aéronautique Internationale (FAI) and in July 2007, he was inducted into the National Aviation Hall of Fame. He was presented at the ceremony by Dick Rutan.

In 1997, Fossett was inducted into the Balloon and Airship Hall of Fame. In February 2002, Fossett was named America's Rolex Yachtsman of the Year by the American Sailing Association at the New York Yacht Club. He was the oldest recipient of the award in its 41-year history, and the only recipient to fly himself to the ceremony in his own plane.

Fossett received the Explorers Medal from the Explorers Club following his solo balloon circumnavigation. He was given the Diplôme de Montgolfier by the Fédération Aéronautique Internationale in 1996. He received the Harmon Trophy, given annually "to the world's outstanding aviator and aeronaut", in 1998 and 2002. He received the Grande Médaille of the Aéro-Club de France, and the British Royal Aero Club's Gold Medal in 2002. He received the Order of Magellan and the French Republic's Médaille de l'Aéronautique in 2003.

The White Knight Two VMS Spirit of Steve Fossett was named in Fossett's honor by his friend Richard Branson in late 2007. Following his disappearance, Peggy Fossett and Dick Rutan accepted the Spread Wings Award on Fossett's behalf at the 2007 Spreading Wings Gala, Wings Over the Rockies Air and Space Museum, Denver, Colorado.

In 2010, Fossett was inducted into the International Air & Space Hall of Fame at the San Diego Air & Space Museum.

== Death ==
=== Disappearance and search ===
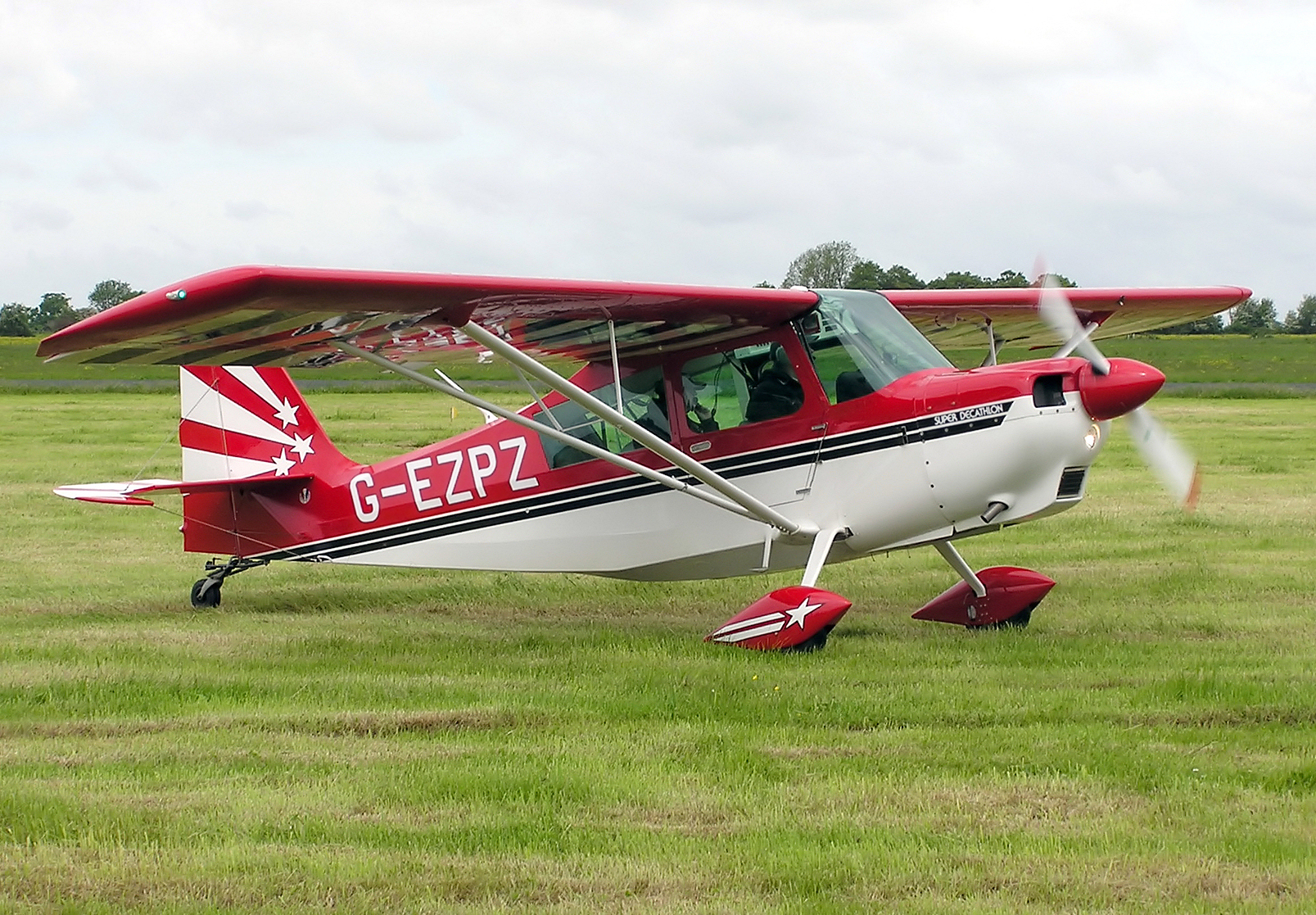
Super Decathlon, similar to the plane Fossett was flying during his disappearance

At 8:45 a.m. on the morning of Monday, September 3, 2007, Fossett took off in a single-engine Champion 8KCAB Super Decathlon light aircraft from the Flying-M Ranch private airstrip, near Smith Valley, Nevada. When he failed to return, searches were launched about six hours later. There was no signal from the plane's emergency locator transmitter (ELT) designed to be automatically activated in the event of a crash, but it was of an older type notorious for failing to operate after a crash.

It was first thought that Fossett may have also been wearing a Breitling Emergency watch with a manually operated ELT that had a range of up to 90 miles (140 km), but no signal was received from it. On September 13, Fossett's wife, Peggy, issued a statement clarifying that he owned such a watch but was not wearing it when he took off for the Labor Day flight.

Search area on the borders of California and Nevada

Fossett took off with enough fuel for four to five hours of flight, according to spokesperson Major Cynthia S. Ryan, Public Information Officer with the Civil Air Patrol (CAP). Searchers with CAP were told that Fossett had gone out for a short flight, possibly including the areas of Lucky Boy Pass and Walker Lake. CAP Major Cynthia Ryan suggested that he might have been out scouting for potential sites to conduct a planned land speed run, though Fossett's wife said the flight was a pleasure trip. Fossett apparently did not file a flight plan and was not required to do so.

On the second day, CAP aircraft searched but found no trace of wreckage after initiating a complex and expanding search of what later evolved into a nearly 20,000 square miles (52,000 km^{2}) area of some of the most rugged terrain in North America. On the first day of CAP searching, operations were suspended by mid-day due to high winds, according to Ryan. By the fourth day, the CAP was using fourteen aircraft in the search effort, including one equipped with the ARCHER system that could automatically scan detailed imaging for a given signature of the missing aircraft.

By September 10, search crews reported eight previously unidentified crash sites, some of which were decades old. After accounting for double-counted sites and prior wrecks recorded by the NTSB, this was reduced to three previously undiscovered plane wrecks. The urgency of what was still regarded as a rescue mission meant that minimal immediate effort was made to identify the aircraft in the uncharted crash sites, although some had speculated that one could have belonged to Charles Clifford Ogle, missing since 1964. About two dozen aircraft were involved in the massive search, operating from the primary search base at Minden, Nevada, with a secondary search base located at Bishop, California.

On September 7, Google Inc. helped the search for the aviator through its connections to contractors that provide satellite imagery for its Google Earth software. British entrepreneur Richard Branson, a friend of Fossett, said he and others were coordinating efforts with Google to see if any of the high-resolution images might include Fossett's aircraft. On September 8, the first of a series of new high-resolution imagery from DigitalGlobe was made available via the Amazon Mechanical Turk beta website so that users could flag potential areas of interest for searching. By September 11, up to 50,000 people had joined the effort, scrutinizing more than 300,000 278-square-foot (26 m^{2}) squares of the imagery. Peter Cohen of Amazon believed that by September 11, the entire search area had been covered at least once.

Amazon's search effort was shut down the week of October 29, without any measurable success. Major Cynthia Ryan later said it had been more of a hindrance than a help. She said that persons purporting to have seen the aircraft on the Mechanical Turk or have special knowledge clogged her email during critical days of the search, and for even months afterward. Many of the ostensible sightings proved to be images of CAP aircraft flying search grids, or simply mistaken artifacts of old images. Psychics flooded the search base in Minden with predictions of where the aviator could be found. One man from Canada was particularly persistent with daily calls to Ryan. Ryan noted that every message, letter, or phone call was taken seriously, which swamped the USAF specialists assigned the task of reviewing every one of them without regard to apparent plausibility. In retrospect, the crowdsource effort was "not ready for prime time", according to Ryan.

On September 12, survival experts speculated that Fossett was likely to be dead. On September 17, the Nevada wing of the Civil Air Patrol said it was suspending all flights in connection with its search operations, but National Guard search flights, private search flights and ground searches continued. The National Transportation Safety Board (NTSB) began a preliminary investigation into the likely crash of the plane that Fossett was flying. The preliminary report stated that Fossett was "presumed fatally injured and the aircraft substantially damaged", but was subsequently revised to remove that assumption. Branson made similar public statements.

On September 19, 2007, authorities confirmed they would stop actively looking for Fossett in the Nevada Desert, but would keep air crews on standby to fly to possible crash sites. On September 30, it was announced that after further analysis of radar data from the day of his disappearance, ground teams and two aircraft had resumed the search. On October 2, 2007, CAP announced it had called off its search operation. Ryan later noted that the search was the largest, most complex peacetime search for an individual in U.S. history.

In July 2008, Simon Donato's Team Adventure Science searched for a week on the Nevada–California border. On August 23, 2008, almost a year after Fossett disappeared, twenty-eight friends and admirers conducted a foot search based on new information and computer modeling. That search concluded on September 10.

=== Search and rescue costs ===
On May 1, 2008, the Las Vegas Review-Journal attributed to Nevada State Governor Jim Gibbons' spokesman, Ben Kieckhefer, the Governor's decision to direct the state to charge Steve Fossett's family for the $687,000 expense of the search for Fossett. Kieckhefer later played that early report down, when he told the Tahoe Daily Tribune that Nevada did not intend to demand an involuntary payment from Fossett's widow, but that such a payment would be voluntary: "We are going to request that they help offset some of these expenses, considering the scope of the search, the overall cost as well as our ongoing budget difficulties." Hotelier Barron Hilton, from whose ranch Fossett had departed on the day he went missing, had previously volunteered $200,000 to help pay for the search costs.

In his later comments to the Tahoe Daily Tribune, Kieckhefer denied outright that a bill for the family was being prepared. Kieckhefer said, "It will probably be in the form of a letter", which he indicated would include a financial outline of the steps taken by the state, the associated costs, and a mention of the state's ongoing budget difficulties.

Days prior to this announcement, state Emergency Management Director Frank Siracusa noted that "there is no precedent where government will go after people for costs just because they have money to pay for it. You get lost, and we look for you. It is a service your taxpayer dollars pay for", although he conceded that legally any decision would rest with Gibbons.

At an April 10, 2008, Legislature's Interim Finance Committee hearing, Siracusa indicated that he had hired an independent auditor to review costs incurred by the state in searching for Fossett, but added, "We are doing an audit but not because we are critical of anybody or suspect something was done wrong". Chairman Morse Arberry queried Siracusa as to why, since they lacked funds, had the state not billed the Fossett family for its search costs, to which Siracusa did not directly respond.

In a later interview with the Las Vegas Review-Journal, Siracusa stated that his comments to the Committee may have given the false impression that he had hired an auditor for the purpose of later challenging the state's financial burden incurred on its behalf by the National Guard during the search operation. Upon interview regarding reports that the state would seek payment, Arberry was recorded as stating that he was glad to hear steps were being taken to try to recoup some of the costs.

The Nevada search cost $1.6 million, "the largest search and rescue effort ever conducted for a person within the U.S." Jim Gibbons asked Fossett's estate to shoulder $487,000, but it declined, saying Fossett's wife had already spent $1 million on private searching.

=== Recovery of wreckage and remains ===
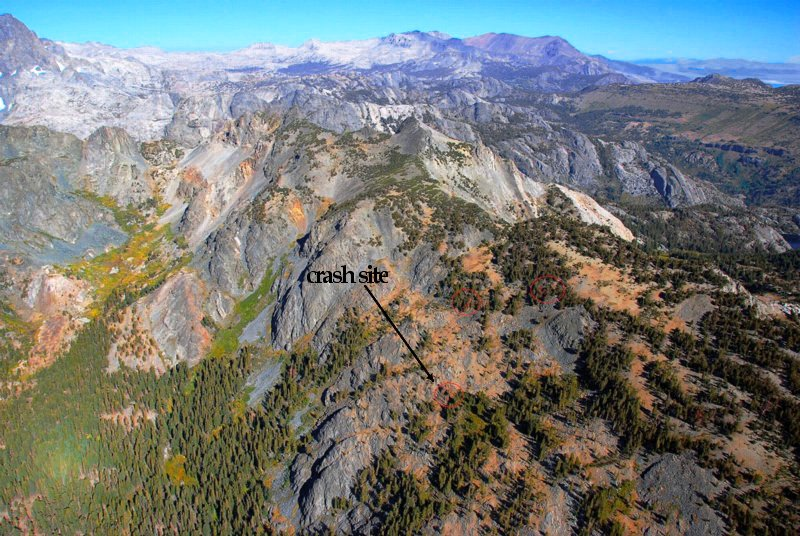
Aerial view of the crash site, 2010

On September 29, 2008, a hiker found three crumpled identification cards on the eastern slope of the Sierra Nevada range in California, about 65 miles (100 km) south (186 degrees) of Fossett's take-off site. The items were confirmed as belonging to Fossett and included an FAA-issued card, his Soaring Society of America membership card and $1,005 in cash.

On October 1, late in the day, air search teams spotted wreckage on the ground at an elevation of 10,100 feet (3,100 m), about 750 yards (690 m) from where the personal items had been found. Later that evening the teams confirmed identification of the tail number of Fossett's plane.

The crash site is located on the western side of a ridge (Volcanic Ridge) which is oriented northwest/southeast, at 37°40′N 119°08′W. It is about 300 feet (91 m) below the crest of the ridge. The steep terrain was sparsely forested with Ponderosa pines averaging 40 feet (12 m) to 60 feet (18 m) tall. Numerous boulders and rock outcrops covered the ground, surrounded by grassy areas.

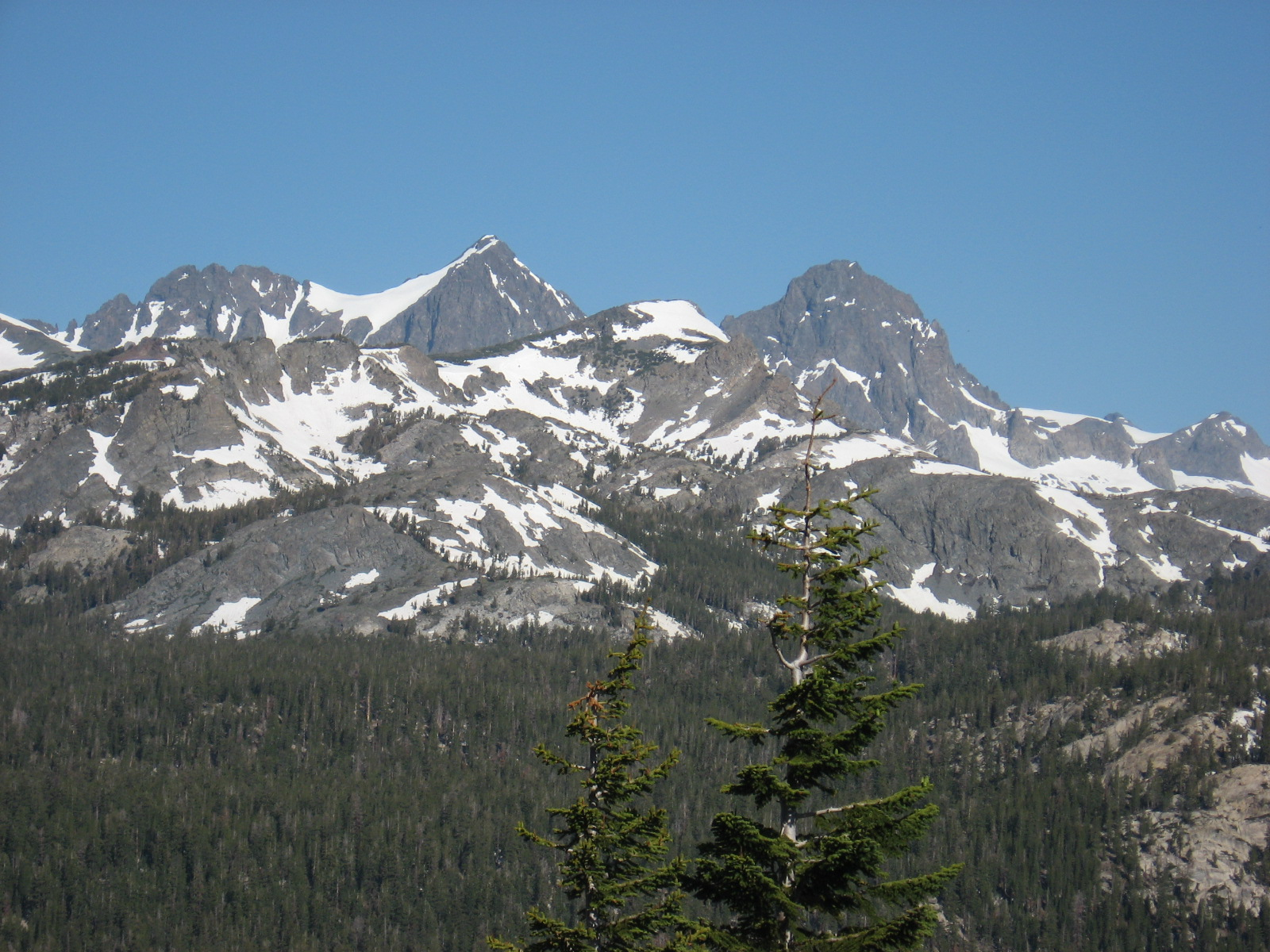
The crash site is on Volcanic Ridge, part of the Ritter Range. Volcanic Ridge is shown here, in the left foreground.

The crash site is within the Ansel Adams Wilderness in Madera County, California. Other named places near the site include Minaret Mine (2,000 feet (600 m) west), Emily Lake (0.7 miles (1.1 km) northeast), Minaret Lake (1.8 miles (2.9 km) west-southwest), the Minaret peaks (3 miles (5 km) west), Devils Postpile National Monument (4.5 miles (7.2 km) southeast), and the town of Mammoth Lakes (the nearest populated place, 9 miles (14 km) east-southeast). The site is 10 miles (16 km) east of Yosemite National Park.

Over the next two days, ground searchers found four bone fragments that were about 2 by 1.5 inches (5 by 4 cm) in size. However, the bones were found to be either not human or too small for DNA tests.

On October 29, search teams recovered two large human bones that they suspected might belong to Fossett. These bones were found 0.5 miles (0.80 km) east of the crash site. Tennis shoes with animal bite marks on them were also recovered.

On November 3, California police coroners said that DNA profiling of the two bones by a California Department of Justice forensics laboratory confirmed a match to Fossett's DNA. Madera County Sheriff John Anderson said Fossett would have died on impact in such a crash, and that it was not unusual for animals to drag remains away.

=== NTSB report and findings ===
On March 5, 2009, the NTSB issued its report and findings. The report states that the plane crashed at an elevation of about 10,000 feet (3,000 m), 300 feet (90 m) below the crest of the ridge. The elevation of peaks in the area exceeded 13,000 feet (4,000 m). However, the density altitude in the area at the time and place of the crash was estimated to be 12,700 feet (3,900 m).

The aircraft, a tandem two-seater, was nearly 30 years old and Fossett had flown approximately 40 hours in this type. The plane's operating manual says that at an altitude of 13,000 feet (4,000 m) the rate of climb would be 300 feet per minute (91 m/min).

The NTSB report says that "a meteorologist from Salinas provided a numerical simulation of the conditions in the accident area using the WRF-ARW (Advanced Research Weather Research and Forecasting) numerical model. At 0930 [the approximate time of the crash] the model displayed downdrafts in that area of approximately 300 feet per minute." There was no evidence of equipment failure.

The report stated that a postmortem examination of the skeletal fragments had been performed under the auspices of the Madera County Sheriff's Department. The cause of death was determined to be multiple traumatic injuries. The ELT was destroyed by the crash.

On July 9, 2009, the NTSB declared the probable cause of the crash as "the pilot's inadvertent encounter with downdrafts that exceeded the climb capability of the airplane. Contributing to the accident were the downdrafts, high density altitude, and mountainous terrain."

== See also ==
- List of firsts in aviation
- List of solved missing person cases (2000s)
