= Free Life (balloon) =

Balloon crashed into Atlantic Ocean

General information
- Type: Roziere type hot-air / helium balloon
- Manufacturer: Mark Semich
- Owners: Rodney Anderson
- Registration: N2079
- Flights: 1
- Total hours: 30
- Total distance: ca 500 mi (800 km; 430 nmi)

History
- Manufactured: 1970
- Last flight: September 20, 1970
- Fate: Crashed / force-landed in the Atlantic, killing all aboard and leaving little identifiable wreckage behind.

Free Life was the name of the Rozière balloon (registration N2079) that made the fourth attempt at crossing the Atlantic Ocean. The balloon was launched from East Hampton, New York on September 20, 1970, piloted by Malcolm Brighton, with Rodney Anderson and Pamela Brown on board.

== Background ==
The adventure was conceived by Rodney Anderson and his wife, Pamela Brown. Pamela Brown was the actress daughter of Kentucky politician and attorney John Y. Brown Sr. and the sister of Kentucky Fried Chicken entrepreneur and future Kentucky Governor John Y. Brown Jr. At age 28, she and her 32-year-old husband, commodities broker Rod Anderson, hoped to break records with the first staffed balloon flight across the Atlantic. The couple planned to recoup the cost of the venture by writing a book about their experience. When Jim Contos, the pilot whom they had been counting on for the flight withdrew close to the time of departure, the Andersons hired Englishman Malcolm Brighton, 32, whose ascent in the Free Life was to be his 100th – and his last. Brighton had built several balloons and became the main builder for the Bristol Belle, the name given to the first modern hot air balloon in Europe.

== The balloon ==
The Free Life attempt was the first use of a Rozière style balloon for an Atlantic attempt, built by Mark Semich, using a combination of helium and hot air. Below the spherical helium gas cell is a conical sleeve where air can be heated by burners in the same way as a normal hot air balloon. By varying the hot air temperature, altitude can be maintained without having to release helium or to drop ballast. The burners are principally used to compensate for the lack of solar heating at night.

== Voyage ==
After four years of planning and postponements, Brighton still had reservations about the balloon and in an interview, in which Brighton was asked what he thought of Free Life, he said

"I think I could have done better."

— Malcolm Brighton, The Free Life: The Spirit of Courage, Folly and Obsession

Experienced balloonists, to whom Brighton had confided his plans to pilot Free Life, advised against it.

Despite this, the balloon was launched from George Sid Miller's pasture on Fireplace Road in Springs, New York, on September 20, 1970. The weather was perfect; families picnicked and partied; the giant yellow, white and orange balloon, seven stories tall, and the 1,500 well-wishers seemed to share a sense of participating in something extraordinary, cheering their ascent.

Disaster struck 30 hours after launch. A hot-air mechanism designed to maintain the balloon's altitude at night failed on the second day of the flight. When the balloon encountered a high-altitude cold front and a severe rainstorm, they were forced to ditch in the Atlantic that night, about 600 miles southeast of Newfoundland. On September 21 came the last message from the Free Life. "We are ditching," it said. "We request search and rescue." The balloon went down in stormy seas off Newfoundland. Three Coast Guard cutters, a Royal Canadian Air Force aircraft and six United States Air Force and United States Coast Guard aircraft scoured the area for 14 days. A few items from the balloon gondola were spotted, but the rescue effort was unsuccessful.

Up to August 1978, 10 subsequent transatlantic balloon crossing attempts were made: In February 1974, while making one such attempt, Colonel Thomas Leigh Gatch, Jr. USAR also disappeared in his Light Heart superpressure balloon. Finally, on August 17, 1978, three Americans - Ben Abruzzo, Maxie Anderson, and Larry Newman crossed the Atlantic by balloon, in the Double Eagle II.

== Tributes ==
In October 1972 Pamela Brown was memorialized with the opening of the Pamela Brown Auditorium, the first and largest theater in the newly built Actors Theatre of Louisville complex.

A book commemorating the attempt was published in 1994 by writer and balloonist Anthony Smith. Entitled The Free Life: The Spirit of Courage, Folly and Obsession, the book was awarded the W.W. Norton & Co. thirteenth Annual Editors' Book Award. Smith was not present at the launch of the balloon in 1970, but he had taught Brighton to fly, and he had flown with him more frequently than anyone else.

A fictional short story describing the balloon was published in the 2023 issue of Spirit Lake Review by Robert Johnson.

== See also ==
- List of ballooning accidents by death toll
