= I'll Sleep When I'm Dead (2016 film) =

- Promotional poster
- Directed by: Justin Krook
- Produced by: David Gelb; Matthew Weaver; Happy Walters; Matt Colon
- Starring: Steve Aoki
- Cinematography: Michael Dwyer
- Edited by: Aaron I. Naar; Nicole Vaskell
- Music by: Duncan Thum
- Production companies: City Room Creative; Hyperion Media Group; MediaWeaver Productions; Fancy Film Post Services
- Distributed by: Netflix; Relativity Media
- Release date: August 19, 2016
- Running time: 79 minutes
- Country: United States
- Language: English

I'll Sleep When I'm Dead is a 2016 American documentary film about EDM artist Steve Aoki. It debuted at the Tribeca Film Festival and was released on Netflix on August 19, 2016. It received a Grammy nomination for Best Music Film in 2016.

== Background ==
It was directed by Justin Krook and was produced by David Gelb, Matthew Weaver, Happy Walters and Matt Colon. Production of the documentary started in 2014, during the time when Aoki's Neon Future album was released. A Facebook Live interview with Aoki was conducted by Katie Couric in support of the release of the documentary on August 24, 2016. Aoki told Krook, "I’m letting you take a picture of me naked and showing the world."

== Premise ==
The documentary shows the life of Steve Aoki as a DJ and producer, and as a family man at home in Japan. Aoki's relationship with his father, owner of the restaurant chain Benihana, was also shown. Interviews with family members, and DJs and musical artists such as Diplo, Tiësto and will.i.am took place.

== Cast ==
Credits adapted from IMDb; sorted in alphabetical order and all cast members played themselves.

- Afrojack
- Benji Madden
- Devon Aoki
- Diplo
- DJ AM
- Eric Garcetti
- Joel Madden
- Kid Ink
- Laidback Luke
- Matt Colton
- Mike Mowery
- Pete Tong
- Rocky Aoki
- Steve Aoki
- Tiësto
- Travis Barker
- Will.i.am
