= Double Eagle (disambiguation) =

Double eagle is a gold coin of the United States with a denomination of $20.

Double Eagle may also refer to:

- Double Eagle (balloon), a helium balloon used in an attempt to cross the Atlantic Ocean in 1977
- Double eagle (golf), a golf score
- Double Eagle (mine disposal vehicle)
- Colt Double Eagle, a pistol
- Milholland Double Eagle, an ultralight aircraft
- The Double Eagle, a novel by James Twining

== See also ==
- Double Eagle II, a helium balloon that crossed the Atlantic Ocean in 1978
- Double Eagle II Airport, an airport in Albuquerque, New Mexico
- Double-headed eagle, a device in heraldry
