= UAG =

UAG may stand for:

== Biology ==
- In biology, the "amber" stop codon UAG; see genetic code

== Education ==
- Universidad Autónoma de Guadalajara, the first private university and host to a large medical school in Mexico.
- University of Arkansas Grantham

== Sports ==
- The African Gymnastics Union (French: l'Union Africaine de Gymnastique)
- Estudiantes Tecos, a Mexican professional football (soccer) club, previously associated with the Universidad Autónoma de Guadalajara, and as Tecos UAG

== Technology ==
- Microsoft Forefront Unified Access Gateway, Microsoft solution for remote access to corporate applications
- VMware Unified Access Gateway

== Transportation ==
- Afra Airlines (ICAO code UAG), an airline in Ghana
- United Auto Group, an American automotive retailer

== Video games ==
- UAG, a video game also known as Thundercade
