= Double Eagle II Airport =

Coordinates: 35°08′43″N 106°47′43″W

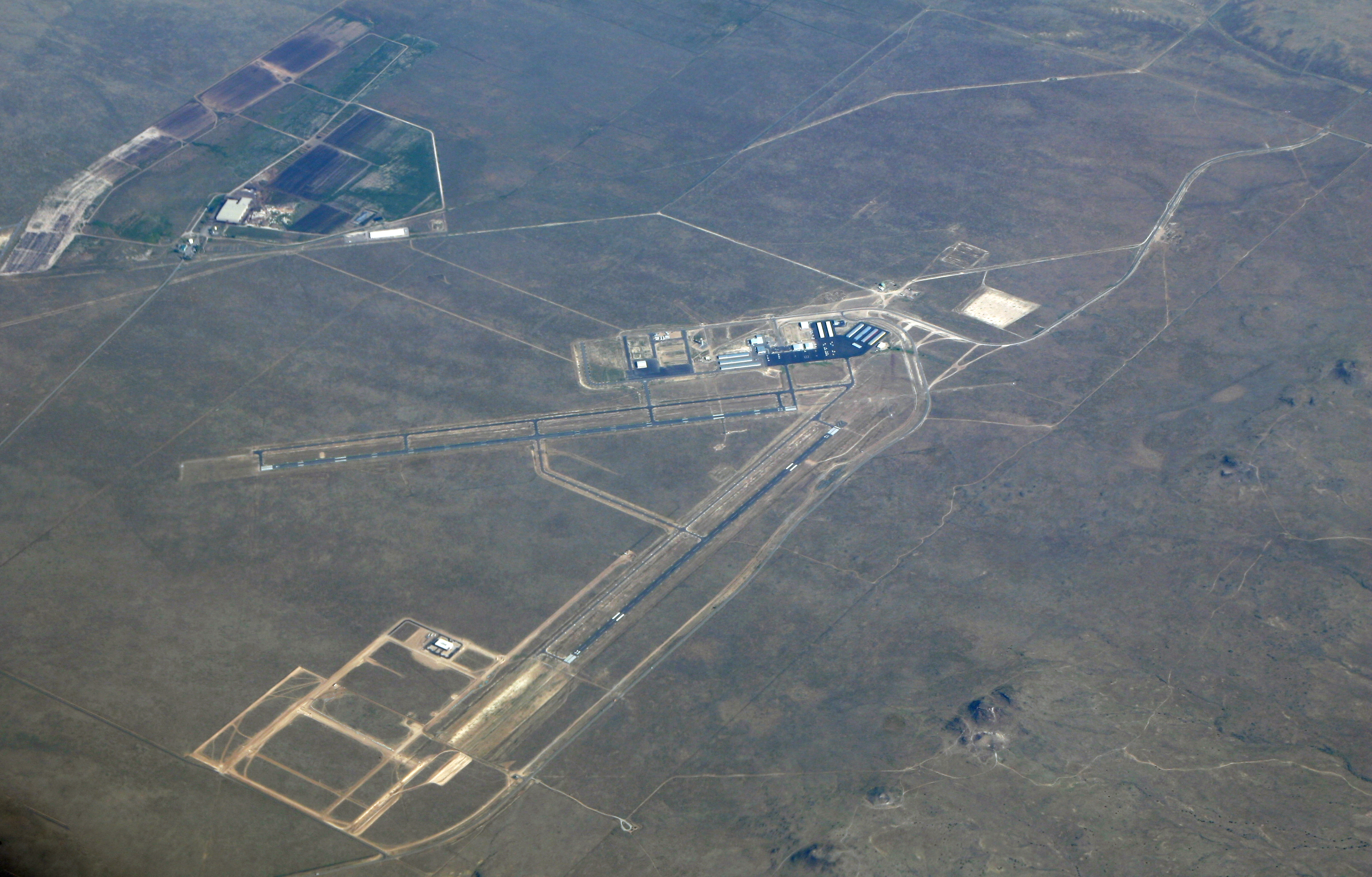
- IATA: none; ICAO: KAEG; FAA LID: AEG

Summary
- Airport type: Public
- Owner: City of Albuquerque
- Serves: Albuquerque, New Mexico
- Elevation AMSL: 5,837 ft (1,779 m)

Map
- Location of airport in New Mexico / United States AEG (the United States)

Runways
| Direction | Length | | Surface |
| Direction | ft | m | Surface |
|---|---|---|---|
| 4/22 | 7,398 | 2,255 | Asphalt |
| 17/35 | 5,983 | 1,824 | Asphalt |

Statistics (2018)
- Aircraft operations: 78,860
- Based aircraft: 136
- Source: Federal Aviation Administration

Double Eagle II Airport (ICAO: KAEG, FAA LID: AEG) is a public airport located seven miles (11 km) northwest of the central business district of Albuquerque, a city in Bernalillo County, New Mexico, United States. It is owned by the City of Albuquerque.

Located on the far west side of the city, it is Albuquerque's second airport after Albuquerque International Sunport. Construction began in 1982, and the airport was named for the Double Eagle II balloon, the first balloon to cross the Atlantic Ocean, piloted by Ben Abruzzo, Maxie Anderson, and Larry Newman. The airport was constructed as a new general aviation reliever airport to replace several smaller airports around Albuquerque that have since been closed.

Although most U.S. airports use the same three-letter location identifier for the FAA and IATA, Double Eagle II is assigned AEG by the FAA but has no designation from the IATA (which assigned AEG to Aek Godang Airport in Padang Sidempuan, Sumatra, Indonesia).

General aviation, air ambulance, corporate flights, military flights, training flights, charter, and private make up approximately 80,000 annual operations.

Utilicraft Aerospace Industries announced in 2005 that it had secured a major investment from the Navajo Nation to build Utilicraft FF-1080 cargo aircraft at Double Eagle II. The deal later fell apart and no planes were built, though the company continued to seek other funding.

== Facilities and aircraft ==
Double Eagle II Airport covers an area of 4,257 acres (1,723 ha) which contains two asphalt paved runways:

- Runway 04/22 – 7,398 ft × 100 ft (2,255 m × 30 m); full ILS & MALSR (22 end); PAPI visual navigational aid
- Runway 17/35 – 5,983 ft × 100 ft (1,824 m × 30 m). REIL (each end); PAPI visual navigational aid

Traffic pattern altitude is 6,800' mean sea level. Right hand traffic patterns for runways 22 and 35.

For the 12-month period ending December 31, 2018, the airport had 78,860 aircraft operations, an average of 216 per day: 97% general aviation, 2% air taxi and 2% military. There were 136 aircraft based at this airport: 107 single-engine, 14 multi-engine, 9 helicopter, 4 ultralight and 2 jet.

The data below lists annual total aircraft operations from 2009 to 2013 from the FAA's Air Traffic Activity System. The percent changes indicate an average of −3.61% in aircraft operations per year over the last 5 years.

Aircraft operations: AEG 2009–2013
| Calendar year | Aircraft operations | % |
|---|---|---|
| 2009 | 80,459 | |
| 2010 | 69,070 | −14.16% |
| 2011 | 69,950 | 1.27% |
| 2012 | 66,427 | −5.04% |
| 2013 | 66,358 | −0.10% |

== Filming location ==
Scenes for the pilot episode of the television series Terminator: The Sarah Connor Chronicles were filmed on location at Double Eagle II Airport. For the filming, the airport's sign was partially covered with a new sign stating the fictional name, "Red Valley Regional Airport", but the lower portion of the sign stating the actual latitude, longitude, and elevation of the airport was left uncovered.

The Better Call Saul episode "Fifi" was filmed here while the airport hosted one of two still-operating B-29 Superfortress bombers named FIFI.
