= Rocky Aoki =

Japanese-American wrestler and restaurateur (1938–2008)

- 青木 廣彰
- Aoki, c. 1981
- Born: Hiroaki Aoki; October 9, 1938; Tokyo, Japan
- Died: July 10, 2008 (aged 69); New York City, U.S.
- Resting place: Kuhombutsu Joshin-ji, Setagaya ward, Tokyo, Japan
- Education: Keio University (no degree); New York City Community College (1963, A.A. in Management)
- Occupations: Restaurateur; Powerboat Racer
- Known for: Founding Benihana, Double Eagle V
- Spouses: Chizuru Kobayashi Aoki (m. 1964; div. 1981); Pamela Hilburger Aoki (m. 1981; div. 1991); Keiko Ono Aoki (m. 2002)
- Children: 7, including Steve and Devon
- Relatives: Yumi Nu (granddaughter)

Hiroaki Aoki (青木 廣彰, Aoki Hiroaki; October 9, 1938 – July 10, 2008), better known as Rocky Aoki, was a Japanese-American restaurateur, professional offshore powerboat racer and amateur wrestler. He was the founder of the Japanese cuisine restaurant chain Benihana and Genesis magazine.

He was also the father of musician Steve Aoki and model and actress Devon Aoki.

== Personal life ==
Hiroaki Aoki was born in Tokyo, the son of Yunosuke Aoki and his wife, Katsu. His family were descended from a samurai clan from Wakayama Prefecture, which served in the Kishū Domain.

Aoki and some friends started a rock and roll band called Rowdy Sounds, though Aoki eventually abandoned music for athletics. He would later explain, "I play bass. But I tell you why I change to wrestling: No good on tempo."

Aoki attended Keio University, where he competed in track and field, karate, and wrestling before being expelled for fighting. While some sources state that he competed for Japan in wrestling at the 1960 Summer Olympics held in Rome, he did not, as he had moved from Tokyo to New York City months before the Games.

Aoki was offered wrestling scholarships from several different American colleges. He attended Springfield College in Springfield, Massachusetts, and later transferred to CW Post College on Long Island. He won the United States flyweight wrestling title in 1962, 1963 and 1964.

In New York City, Aoki worked seven days a week in an ice cream truck that he rented in Harlem while studying restaurant management at New York City Community College.

Aoki, who was married three times, once said that he had "three kids from three different women at exactly the same time." He found out about the seventh with the third woman when he was sued for paternity. His third wife was Keiko Aoki, a businesswoman whom he married in 2002.

Before his death, he became a United States citizen.

== Benihana ==
After he received his associate degree in management in 1963, he used the $10,000 he had saved from the ice cream business to convince his father to co-invest in the first Benihana, a four-table teppanyaki restaurant on West 56th Street. "Benihana", taken from the Japanese name for safflower, was suggested by Aoki's father. According to family legend, Aoki's father was walking through the bombed-out ruins of post-war Tokyo when he happened across a single red safflower growing in the rubble.

== Genesis ==
In August 1973, Aoki launched Genesis, a softcore pornographic men's magazine, with two centerfolds each issue. The title changed hands several times, eventually becoming an explicit publication long after Aoki's period of ownership. Despite not enjoying the mainstream popularity of rivals Playboy and Penthouse, the magazine remained in activity for nearly 40 years.

== Sports activities ==
=== Double Eagle V ===
Aoki partially funded and crewed the Double Eagle V, the first balloon to successfully cross the Pacific Ocean. The Double Eagle V launched from Nagashima, Japan, on November 10, 1981, and landed in Mendocino National Forest in California 84 hours and 31 minutes later. It traveled a record 5,768 miles (9,283 km). The Double Eagle V's four-man crew consisted of Rocky Aoki with Albuquerque balloonists Ben Abruzzo, Larry Newman, and Ron Clark. Overshadowed by the concurrent Space Shuttle mission STS-2, the Double Eagle V failed to attract the same degree of media attention as the earlier Double Eagle flights.

=== Powerboat racing ===
Aoki competed professionally as an offshore powerboat racer along with the 1986 APBA world champion Powerboat throttleman Errol Lanier, a former Fort Lauderdale, Florida, fireman who saved his life in a near-fatal powerboat crash in 1979 under the Golden Gate Bridge.

Despite several crashes and failures to finish due to damage to his boat or mechanical failures, Aoki was quite successful as an offshore racer, winning several races. He twice won the Benihana Grand Prix in Point Pleasant, New Jersey, sponsored by his own company — the second win came in 1982, three years after his devastating San Francisco crash. After injuries suffered in an accident later in the 1982 season, Aoki told sportswriters that he was leaving the sport.

== Lawsuits ==
On June 9, 1998, Aoki was charged with insider trading and profiting by more than $590,000 from it. The U.S. Attorney's office in Brooklyn charged Aoki with six counts of insider trading and one count of conspiracy based on trading upon inside information about Spectrum Information Technologies Inc. According to the indictment, Aoki learned through Donald Kessler, a former stock promoter, inside information concerning Spectrum's imminent hiring of John Sculley, then-chairman of Apple Computer Inc., as the chairman of Spectrum, and bought 200,000 shares of Spectrum stock. That stock rose 46% the day that this hiring was publicized.

In 1999, Aoki pleaded guilty to insider trading charges and was fined $500,000 and given three years' probation. Aoki was placed in deportation proceedings as a result of his guilty plea/conviction, but was granted relief by an immigration judge and his permanent resident ("green card") status maintained. He eventually became a United States citizen.

In 2005, Aoki sued four of his children (Grace, Kevin, Kyle, and Echo) for an alleged attempt to take control of the companies he founded, which, at the time, had an estimated value between US$60–100 million.

== Honors ==
Aoki was a recipient of the Award of Excellence from The International Center in New York. He was inducted into the National Wrestling Hall of Fame in 1995.

== Death ==
Aoki died on July 10, 2008, of pneumonia in New York City. At the time of his death, he had been suffering from diabetes, Hepatitis C, and cirrhosis of the liver. His hepatitis was reportedly the result of a blood transfusion after a 1979 speedboat crash under the Golden Gate Bridge.

At the time of his death, Aoki had seven children and was married to his third wife Keiko. These included musician Steve Aoki and actress-model Devon Aoki. Model and singer-songwriter Yumi Nu is his granddaughter. His grave is at the cemetery attached to Joshin temple in Setagaya Ward, Tokyo.
