= Anderson Abruzzo Albuquerque International Balloon Museum =

Museum in New Mexico, United States

Coordinates: 35°11′23.25″N 106°35′52.25″W

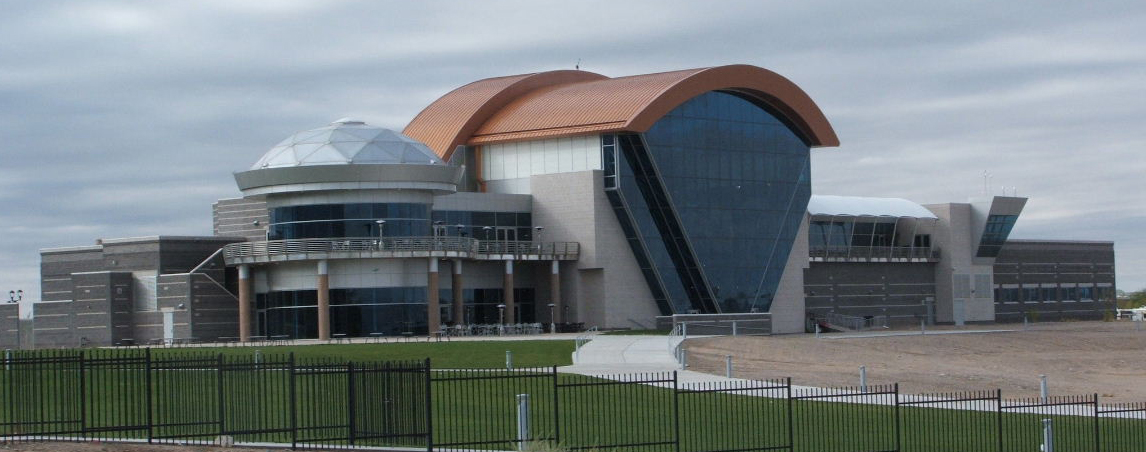
The museum as seen from Balloon Fiesta Park

The Anderson Abruzzo Albuquerque International Balloon Museum is a museum dedicated to the worldwide history, science, and art of all types of ballooning and lighter-than-air flight. It is located in Albuquerque, New Mexico, US, and is situated just outside the grounds used for the Albuquerque International Balloon Fiesta, the world's largest yearly balloon fiesta, and is named for Ben Abruzzo and Maxie Anderson, two Albuquerque natives who established several ballooning firsts, such as crossing the Atlantic Ocean and continents.

Ben Abruzzo and Maxie Anderson most notably crewed the Double Eagle II balloon in 1978, the first gas balloon to complete a transatlantic flight. Abruzzo and Anderson stretched the limits of ballooning and air travel until their untimely passings in 1983, and are honored for their excellence and history with ballooning here in Albuquerque.

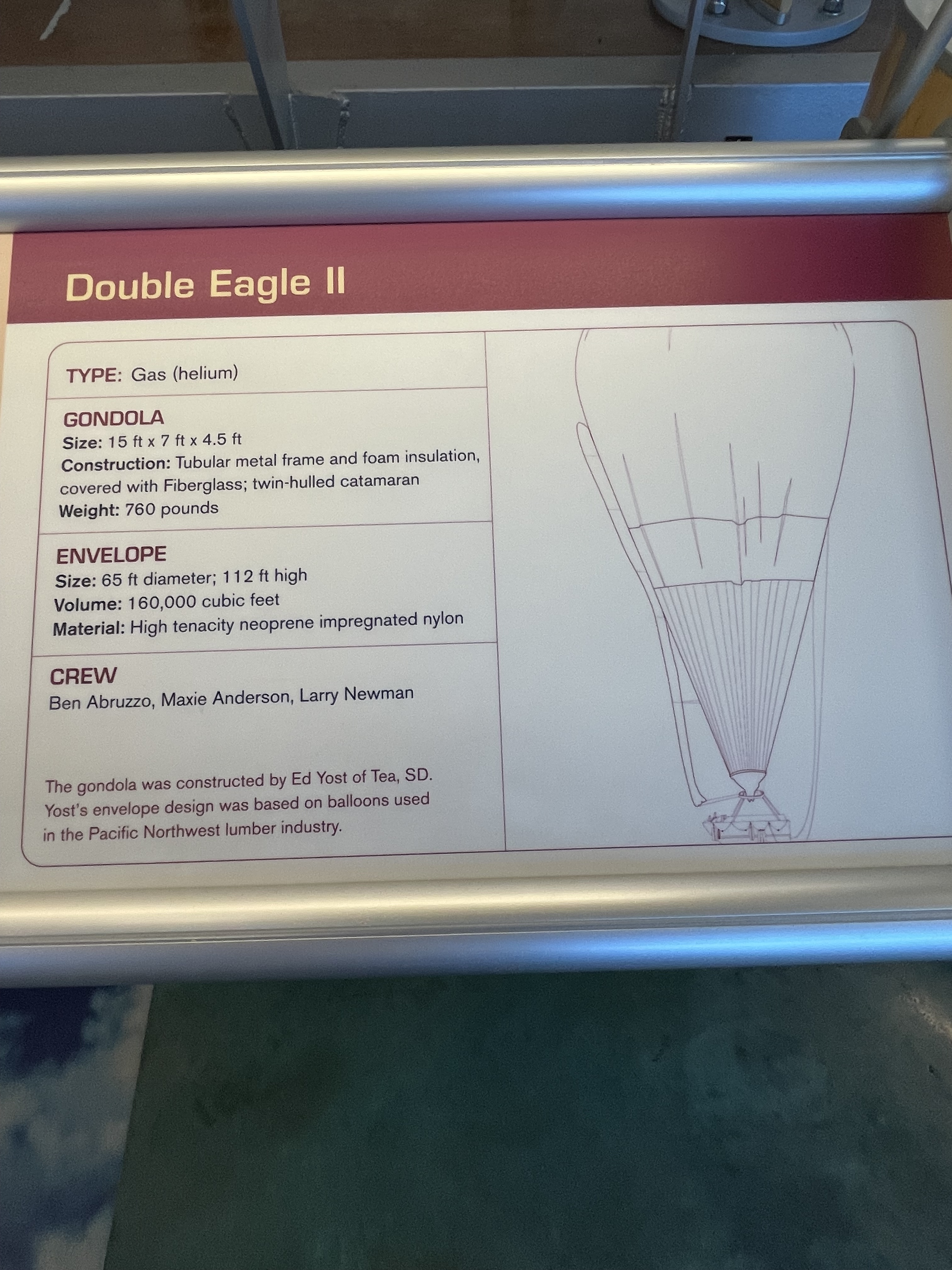
Some specifics and information about the Double Eagle II Gas Balloon Transatlantic Flight, which was piloted by museum namesakes, Ben Abruzzo and Maxie Anderson themselves, with the help of Larry Newman in August 1978. A whole exhibit is dedicated to the instruments, notes, and regalia of the 5 Double Eagle flights in the largest portion of the museum.

Opened on October 1, 2005, it is owned by the city of Albuquerque and is a collaborative project of the Anderson Abruzzo International Balloon Museum Foundation, a 501(c)(3) tax exempt not-for-profit corporation, and the City of Albuquerque's Cultural Services Division. It is a 59,000-square-foot (5,500 m^{2}) facility with class rooms, conference rooms, and many exhibits on the history of ballooning, including items from famous balloonists such as Ed Yost, Joseph Kittinger, and Ben Abruzzo.

== Attractions ==
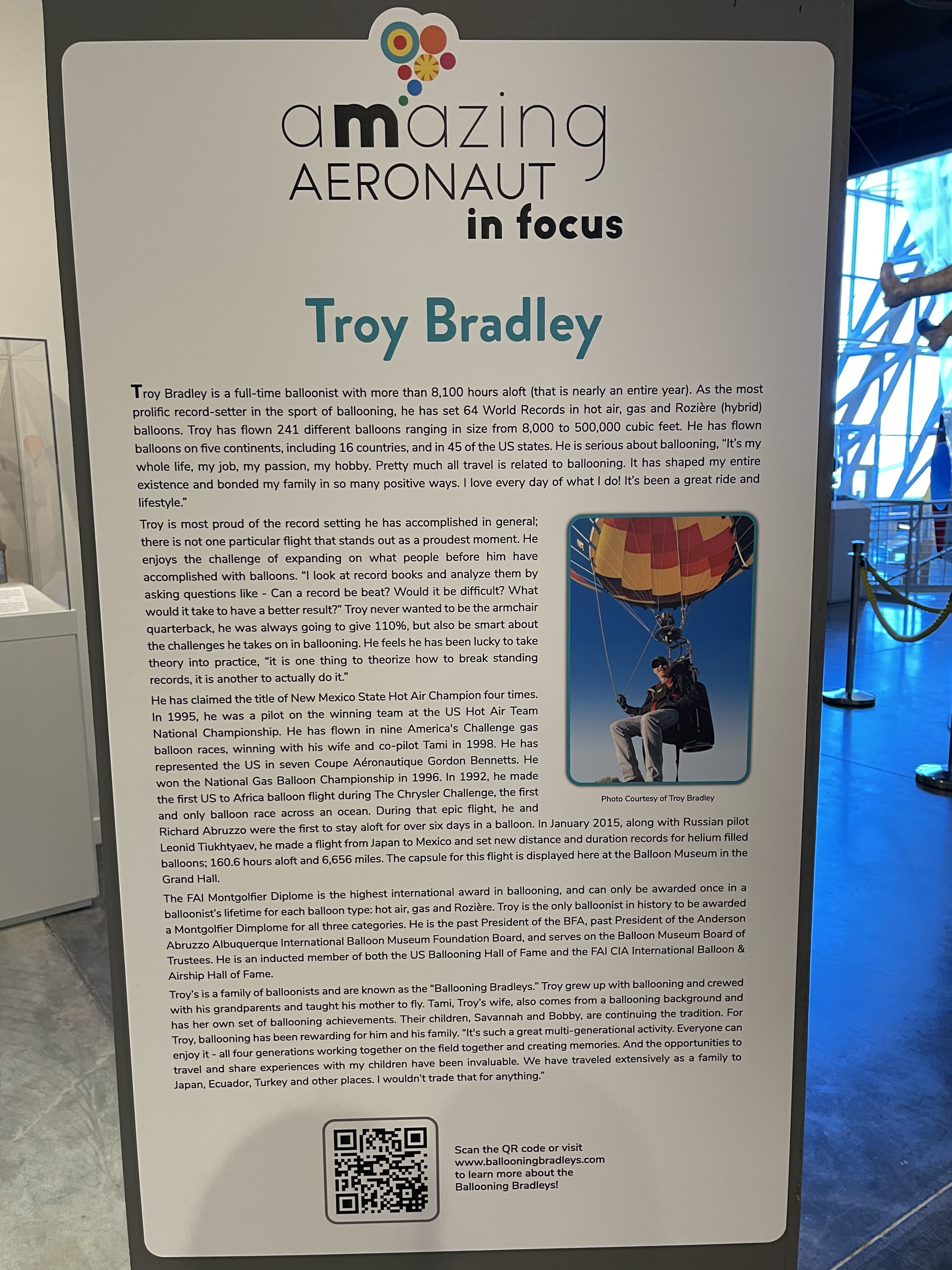
Some information about Troy Bradley's feats and contributions. As of Summer 2022 a yellow flight jacket of Bradley's was also displayed, with many highly specific and unique patches. Troy Bradley has spent over a day of flight hours with hot air balloons cumulatively, and has flown over 241 balloons of varying size.

Museum exhibits include artifacts and materials related to the history of ballooning and the science behind ballooning. Modern multimedia systems such as a balloon flight simulator provide both education and entertainment. The recently opened movie theater provides both 2D and 4D films.

Several notable displays include Women's Contribution to the History of Ballooning, Sid Cutter's influence on the Albuquerque Ballooning Industry, and a Troy Bradley Pilot Spotlight for his significant experience flying and numerous awards.

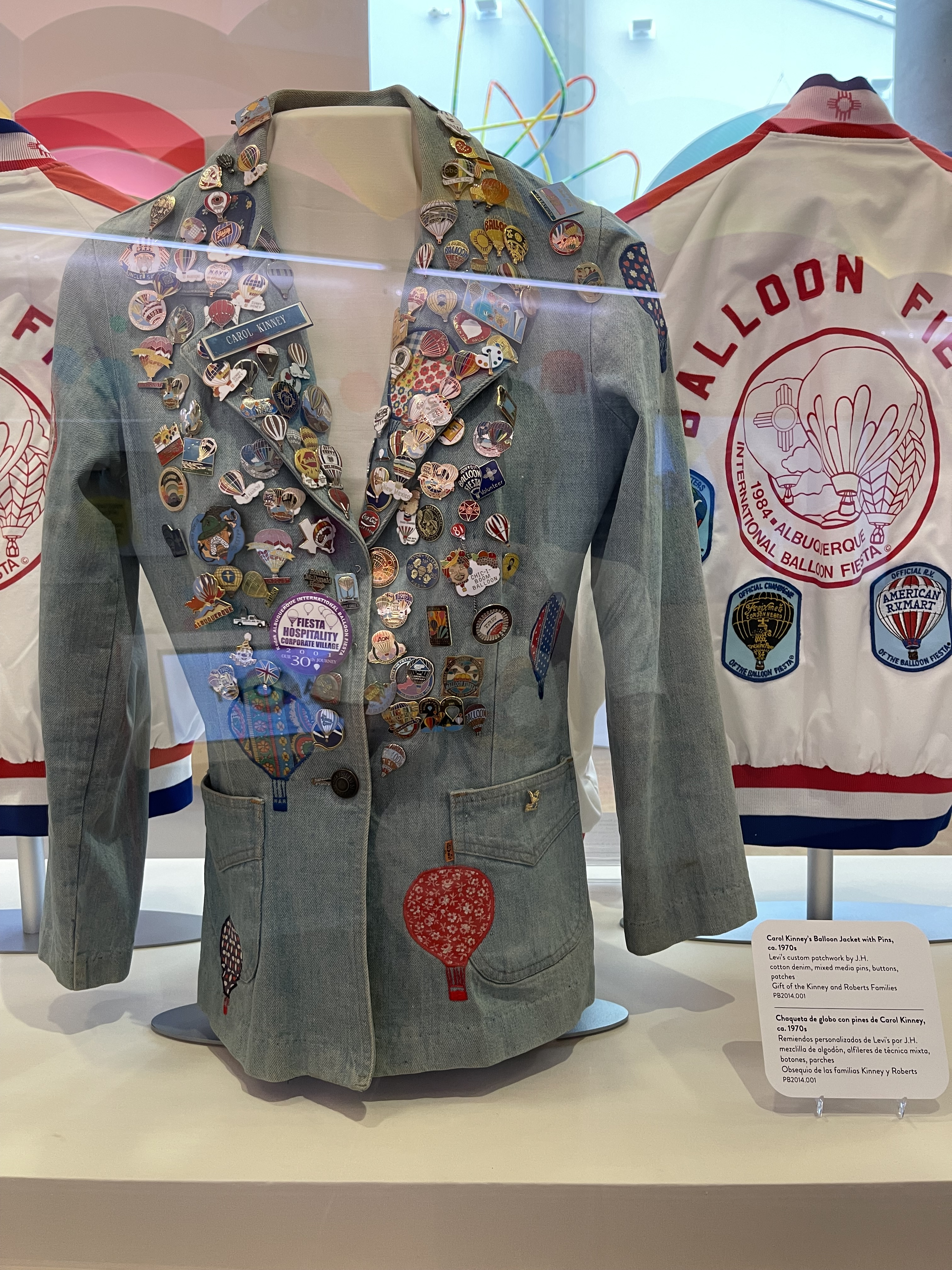
From Women's Contributions: Denim Jacket covered in commemorative Balloon Pins, worn by Carol Kinney, the first Balloonmeisterin for the Albuquerque International Balloon Fiesta, 1982.

== Building design and construction ==
The museum, designed by the architectural firm Gerald A. Martin, Ltd., is a partial two-story high bay building. The high bay, which is the main gallery, is 80 feet tall with a tensile fabric roof. The interior ceiling is 75 feet high.

Construction of the museum was completed in November 2004 at a cost of $10.4 million. Framing is chiefly steel with some concrete supports. The structural engineer of record was Chavez-Grieves Consulting Engineers.

== Tim Anderson 4-D Theater ==
In 2006, the Balloon Museum planned to add a new 4-D movie theater. To pay for the equipment, the museum obtained a sizable grant from the State of New Mexico. The money, some $1.7 million, was distributed by then-governor Bill Richardson without oversight or review. The museum used a million dollars to buy the video equipment, which was delivered in 2008. Unfortunately a 2009 feasibility study showed that the equipment was too big to fit into the building, and that the engineering challenges related to installing the equipment would not be more expensive than expected. However the theater was completed and opened in 2016.

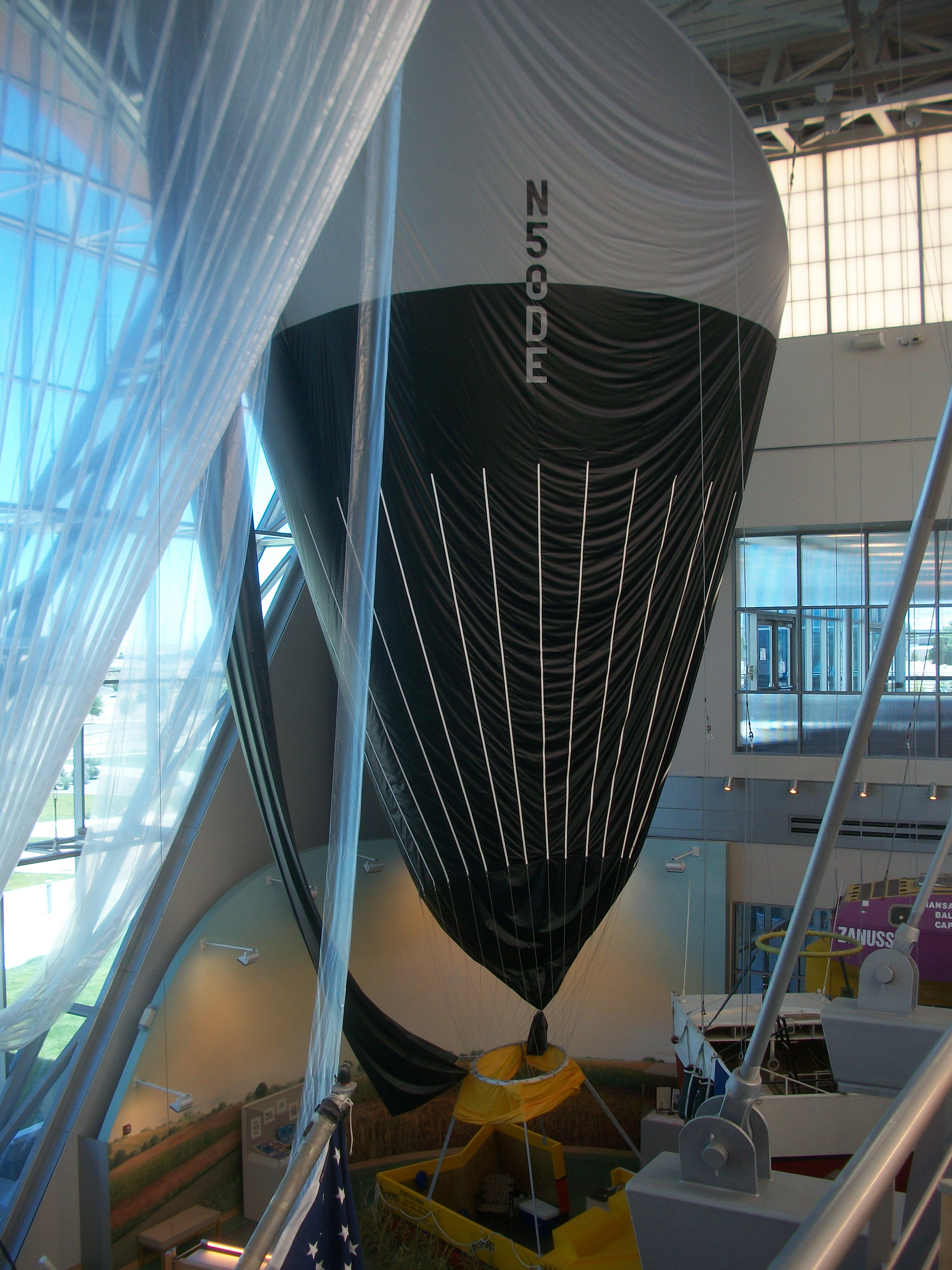
Interior exhibitions.

== See also ==
- List of aviation museums
- List of U.S. Ballooning Hall of Fame inductees
