= Afra Airlines =

Ghanaian airline

IATA	ICAO	Call sign
—	UAG	AFRALINE
- Founded: 2003; Accra, Ghana
- Commenced operations: 2003
- Ceased operations: 2005
- Alliance: CTK - CiTylinK
- Parent company: Global Air
- Key people: Luke Butler, CEO

Afra Airlines was a privately owned Ghanaian airline, established in 2003 in Accra, which never commenced operations.

It was intended as a new consumer airline to be focused on providing low-cost air services to and from destinations within Ghana, Africa, Europe and North America. It had management connections with Global Air Group, which was also unsuccessful. Afra Airlines itself ceased trading in 2005 after Ghana Police charged its CEO with defrauding investors.

== History ==
Afra Airlines was established in 2003 by Luke and Simone Butler, who had moved to Accra to establish Afra Airlines, Afra Resorts & Holdings and Afra Air Cargo. The airline was awarded its Air Carriers licence for cargo and passenger operations by the Ghana Civil Aviation Authority, and an Air Tour Operators Licence from the Ghana Tourist Board.

In January 2005 it was announced that Afra Airlines was to merge with Boeing 747 owner and charter operator, Global Air Group, to complete financing arrangements for the purchase of 100 Utilicraft Aerospace Industries new FF-1080-300 Freight Feeder aircraft, for deliveries starting in 2007. This was subsequently denied by Babcock & Brown, who had been cited as having been engaged as transaction advisors.

Afra Airlines claimed to have entered a co-operative agreement with CTK - CiTylinK on new regional services, although this was also denied by CiTylinK management. The new service, allegedly to be named AfraCityLink, was announced to start domestic services on 15 February 2005, but never commenced operations.

Afra Airlines then claimed corruption by the Government of Ghana prevented it from operating, accusing President John Kufour of a high level conspiracy to frustrate them. As a direct consequence Afra Airlines laid off 40 Ghanaian staff, closed its offices, put its investments in Ghana on hold for the foreseeable future, and management fled the country. Their CEO remains a fugitive wanted by Ghana Police.
