= Yumi Nu =

American model (born 1996)

- Born: September 23, 1996 (age 30); Englewood, New Jersey, U.S.
- Occupations: Model; Singer-songwriter
- Years active: 2010–present
- Relatives: Rocky Aoki (grandfather); Steve Aoki (uncle); Devon Aoki (aunt)
- Modeling information
- Height: 5 ft 11 in (180 cm)
- Hair color: Brown
- Eye color: Brown
- Agency: The Society Management (New York); Wilhelmina Models (Los Angeles)

Yumi Nu (born September 23, 1996) is an American model. She appeared on the cover of the Sports Illustrated Swimsuit Issue in 2022, becoming the first plus-size model of Asian-American descent to do so.

== Early life ==
Nu was born in Englewood, New Jersey, on September 23, 1996. She is of Japanese and Dutch descent. Her mother, Kana Grace Nootenboom, is the daughter of Rocky Aoki, the founder of the Benihana restaurant chain. Her mother modeled and brought Nu to participate in shoots as an infant. Nu is the niece of Devon Aoki and Steve Aoki.

Nu's family moved from New Jersey to Maryland when she was seven years old. She has stated that she was one of two students of Asian-American descent in her school, and experienced racism while living in Maryland. When she was 14 years old, her family moved to Newport Beach, California.

== Career ==
Nu began modeling in 2010. She began practicing songwriting at the age of 12, and wrote her first song in 2016. Nu released an extended play in June 2019. Nu is signed to her uncle's record label, Dim Mak Records.

Nu created Blueki, a plus-size clothing line. She was on the cover of the American and Japanese editions of Vogue in 2021, and also appeared in British Vogue. Nu made her debut appearance in Sports Illustrated's annual Swimsuit Issue in 2021, becoming the first Asian plus-size model to appear. Nu was one of the cover models for the Swimsuit Issue in 2022, and released her second EP, Hajime, in May 2022. She was also invited to the White House's celebration of Asian American and Pacific Islander Heritage Month in May 2022.

== Personal life ==
Nu resides in Silver Lake, Los Angeles. Her younger sister, Natalie Nootenboom, is also a model.
