= Gassho =

Gasshō or gasshou can refer to

- gasshō (合掌), a position used for greeting in various Buddhist traditions
- gasshō-zukuri (合掌造), a style of Japanese farmhouses

== See also ==
- Gasho of Japan
