= Maxie Anderson =

American balloonist (1934–1983)

- Anderson (1981)
- Born: Max Leroy Anderson; September 10, 1934; Sayre, Oklahoma, U.S.
- Died: June 27, 1983 (aged 48); Bad Kissingen, West Germany
- Cause of death: Balloon crash
- Resting place: Sunset Memorial Park, Albuquerque, New Mexico; 35°06′29.2″N 106°37′59.9″W
- Education: Missouri Military Academy; University of North Dakota
- Occupations: Balloonist, businessman
- Awards: Congressional Gold Medal (1979)

Maxie Anderson (September 10, 1934 – June 27, 1983) was an American hot air balloonist and Congressional Gold Medal recipient. He was part of the balloon crews that made the first Atlantic ocean crossing by balloon in the Double Eagle II and the first Pacific ocean crossing by balloon in the Double Eagle V.

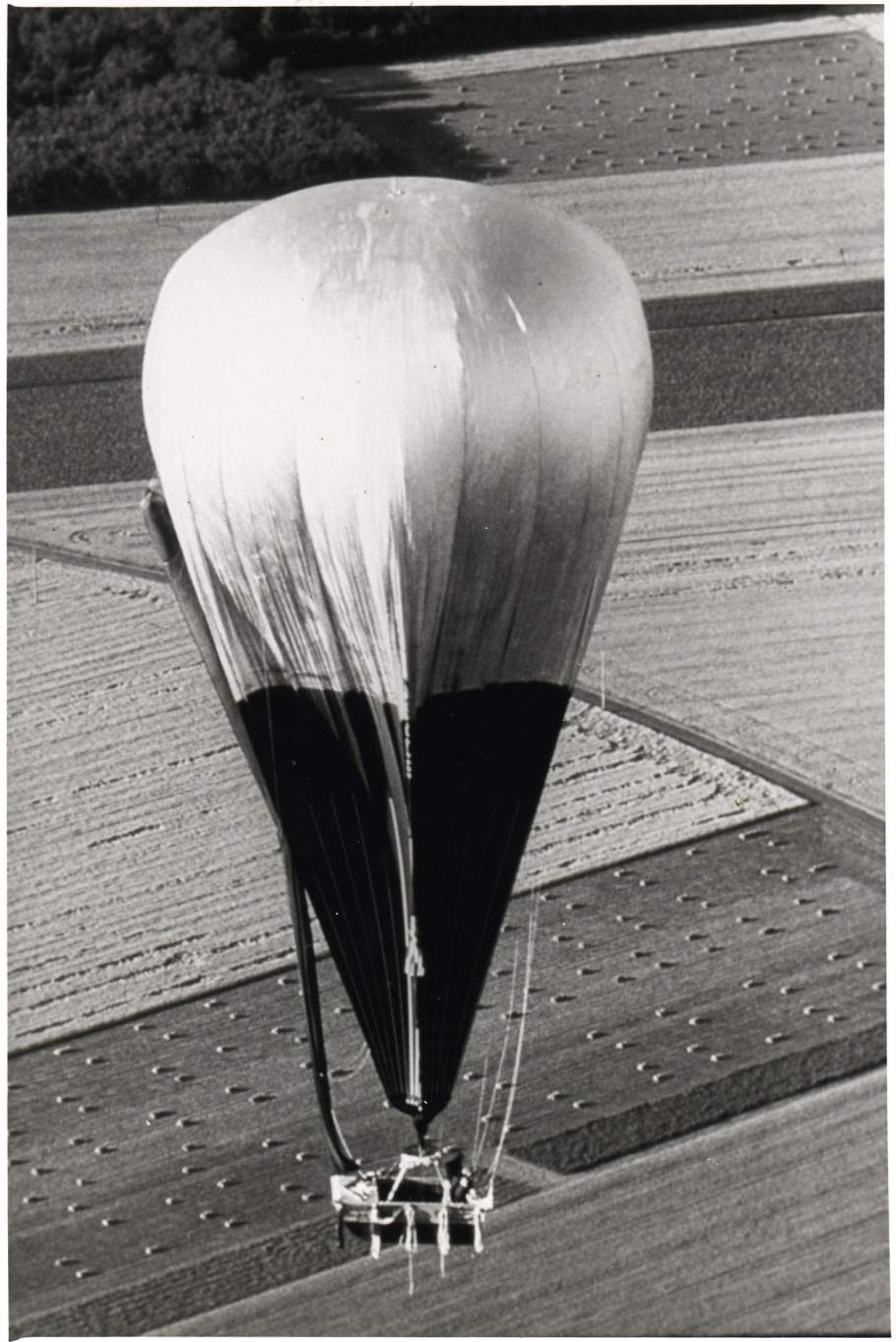
The gas balloon Double Eagle II over Presque Isle, Maine attempting to cross the Atlantic

== Early life and education ==
Born Max Leroy Anderson in Sayre, Oklahoma, to rancher and mining industry executive Carl Anderson. He entered the Missouri Military Academy at Mexico, Missouri, at the age of eight, and throughout his high school years assisted his father in building pipelines. He engaged in prospecting in the Arctic Circle before completing his degree in industrial engineering at the University of North Dakota in 1956. He developed an early interest in flight, obtaining a license at the age of fifteen (having misrepresented his age). This allowed him to fly a plane to the academy at age 15, while cars were banned except for those aged 18. In Albuquerque, New Mexico, he entered the mining industry, acquiring his own company, Ranchers Exploration and Development Corporation, before he was thirty. His career was marked by innovations in extraction technologies, delivery systems, and administrative practices. For his work, Anderson was inducted into the National Mining Hall of Fame.

== Ballooning ==
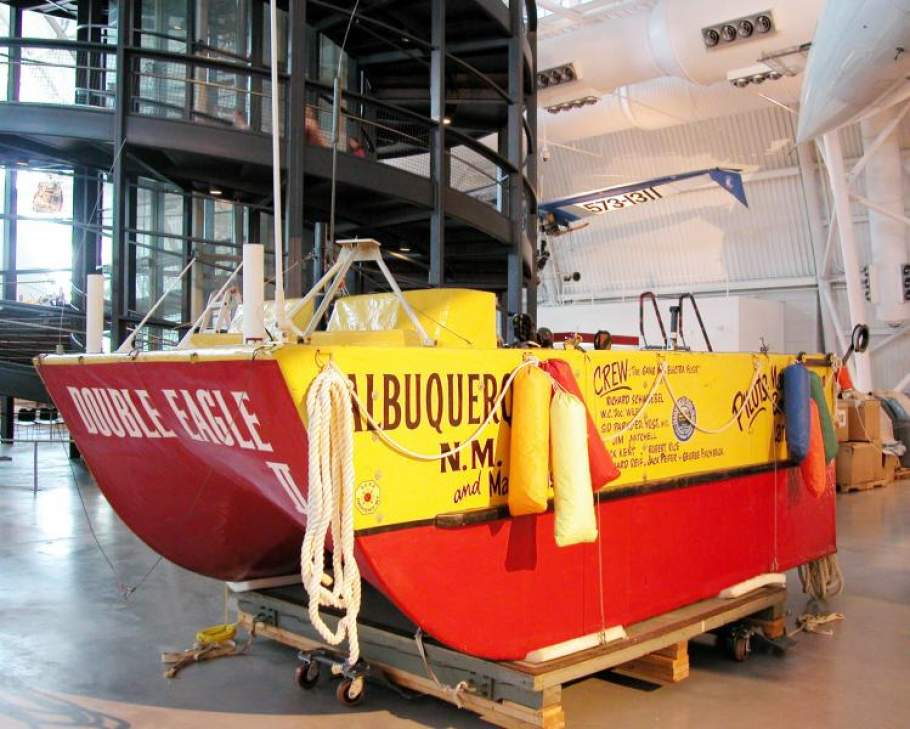
Double Eagle gondola

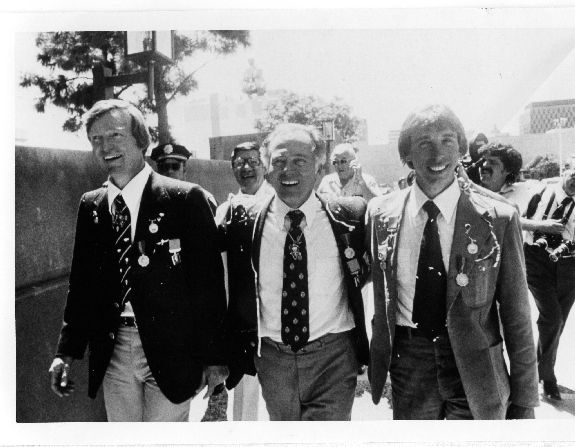
Ben Abruzzo, Maxie Anderson, and Larry Newman of Double Eagle II

Along with his friend Ben Abruzzo, he became interested in hot air ballooning. The two decided to commemorate the fiftieth anniversary of Charles Lindbergh's flight, and engaged balloonist Ed Yost (whose transatlantic bid had failed in 1976) to build the Double Eagle. The balloon was launched near Marshfield, Massachusetts on September 9, 1977, but the flight was aborted off the coast of Iceland on September 13. In 1978 Larry Newman, a manufacturer of hang gliders, was added to the crew for the next attempt in the Double Eagle II. This venture was launched August 11 at Presque Isle, Maine, and arrived at Miserey, France, on August 17. For their efforts, the team was awarded the Congressional Gold Medal in 1979. It was both a distance record (3108 miles) and a duration record (137 hours) for the sport.

With his son Kristian, he made the first non-stop trans-North American balloon flight. The Kitty Hawk departed Fort Baker, California, on May 8, 1980, and landed on May 12 at Sainte-Félicité, Quebec.

Anderson attempted to complete a circumnavigation of the globe by balloon. With Don Ida he launched the balloon Jules Verne from Luxor, Egypt on January 11, 1981, travelling 4,316 kilometres (2,682 mi), and landing in Hansa, India 48 hours later.

== Death ==
Anderson and his co-pilot Don Ida were killed on June 27, 1983, near Bad Kissingen, West Germany, while participating as non-competitors in the Gordon Bennett Cup balloon race. Having no wish to stray across the border into East Germany or Czechoslovakia, he attempted to release the gondola from the envelope at touchdown. The bolts failed to fire, and a gust re-lofted the vehicle, whereupon the explosive bolts deployed, and both Anderson and Ida were killed in the fall. The locale of the accident is also given as "near the village of Schönderling in the county of Bad Kissingen" in a history of the race.

== Legacy ==
In 1973, Anderson founded the Anderson Valley Vineyards with his wife Patty. "We have a lot of balloon-themed wines and items," wine expert Angela Le Quieu says. She adds that the label for the winery's Balloon Blush wine always uses a picture from the previous year's Albuquerque International Balloon Fiesta. Creating a foundation, the Abruzzo and Anderson families partnered with the City of Albuquerque and constructed the Anderson-Abruzzo Albuquerque International Balloon Museum next to the launch field of the Albuquerque International Balloon Fiesta. The World's most photographed event, Fiesta is held the second week of every October. In addition to the Anderson-Abruzzo Albuquerque International Balloon Museum, Anderson's name lives on with the Maxie Anderson Award, for Albuquerque's "business owner who has demonstrated excellence in business success; reputation; community involvement; leadership; humanity; and humor."

== See also ==
- List of Congressional Gold Medal recipients
