= Double Eagle V =

Type of balloon

Double Eagle V was the first balloon to make a successful crossing of the Pacific Ocean. It launched from Nagashima, Japan on November 10, 1981, and landed in Mendocino National Forest in California 84 hours and 31 minutes later, travelling a record 5,768 miles (9,283 km). The four-man crew consisted of Albuquerque balloonists Ben Abruzzo, Larry Newman, and Ron Clark, and thrill-seeking restaurateur Rocky Aoki, who helped fund the flight. The helium-filled Double Eagle V spent four days crossing the Pacific before the balloon, weighed down by ice and buffeted by a storm, crash-landed in northern California, ending the nearly 6,000-mile flight. No one was hurt.

Abruzzo and Newman had previously been two of the pilots of Double Eagle II, which in 1978 became the first balloon to cross the Atlantic.

Double Eagle V failed to attract the same degree of media attention as the earlier flight, in part because it was overshadowed by the concurrent Space Shuttle mission STS-2.

In January 2015, the crew of the Two Eagles Balloon completed a flight across the Pacific Ocean. On July 15, 2015, it was verified by the Fédération Aéronautique Internationale as having broken the distance record of the Double Eagle V.
