= Miserey =

- Commune
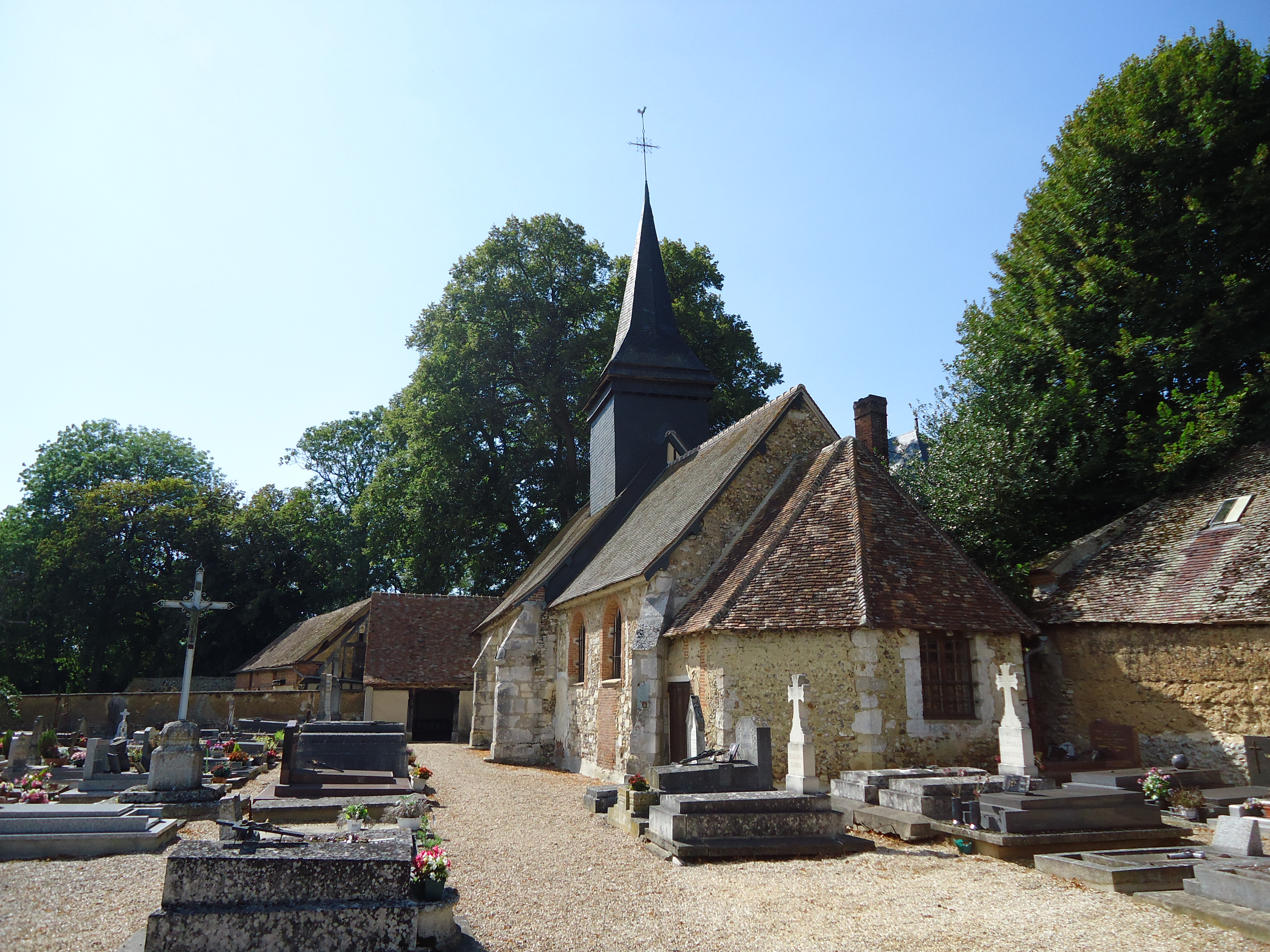
- The church in Miserey
- Location of Miserey
- Location within France Location within Normandy
- Coordinates: 49°01′19″N 1°16′16″E
- Country: France
- Region: Normandy
- Department: Eure
- Arrondissement: Évreux
- Canton: Évreux-3
- Intercommunality: CA Évreux Portes de Normandie

Government
  - Mayor (2020–2026): Hervé Gilles
- Area^{1}: 8.11 km^{2} (3.13 sq mi)
- Elevation: 150 m (490 ft)
- Highest elevation: 139 m (456 ft)
- Lowest elevation: 122 m (400 ft)
- Population (2023): 589
  - Density: 72.6/km^{2} (188/sq mi)
- Time zone: UTC+01:00 (CET)
  - Summer (DST): UTC+02:00 (CEST)
- INSEE/Postal code: 27410 /27930
- ^{1} French Land Register data, which excludes lakes, ponds, glaciers > 1 km^{2} (0.386 sq mi or 247 acres) and river estuaries.

Miserey (French pronunciation: [mizʁɛ]) is a commune in the Eure department in the Normandy region in Northern France.

== History ==
On 23 August 1944, the first Recon Platoon of the 823rd Tank Destroyer Bn., 30th Infantry Division was ordered to recon the village of Miserey, 8 km (5 mi) east of Évreux. Proceeding, the platoon found the town occupied by the German Army. A small-scale battle ensued, ending with 20 enemy KIA and 40 POWs. The Battalion Command Post (CP) was established in a small château there at 3:30 p.m.

The first Recon Platoon claims credit for the liberation of Miserey. The village has a monument to Ben Abruzzo, Maxie Anderson and Larry Newman, the pioneering balloonists who flew the Double Eagle II across the Atlantic Ocean from Presque Isle, Maine, United States, landing in Miserey on the 17 August 1978.

== In popular culture ==
Miserey is portrayed in the 2017 thriller ministries La Mante as Damien Carrot's childhood hometown.

== Population ==
Historical population
| Year | Pop. | ±% p.a. |
|---|---|---|
| 1968 | 302 | — |
| 1975 | 357 | +2.42% |
| 1982 | 431 | +2.73% |
| 1990 | 448 | +0.48% |
| 1999 | 473 | +0.61% |
| 2007 | 527 | +1.36% |
| 2012 | 567 | +1.47% |
| 2017 | 629 | +2.10% |
| 2023 | 589 | −1.09% |
Source: INSEE

== See also ==
- Communes of the Eure department
