= Devon Aoki =

American actress and fashion model (born 1982)

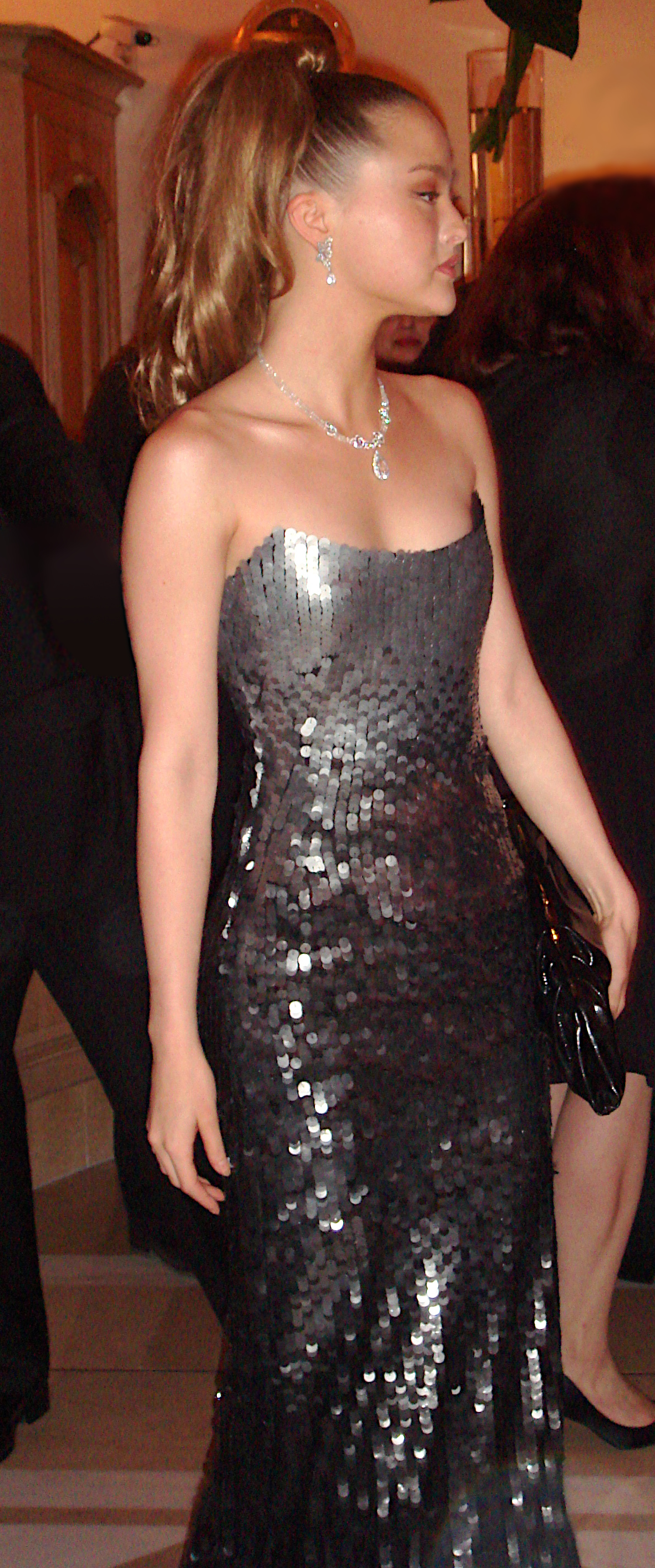
- Aoki in 2008
- Born: Devon Edwenna Aoki; August 10, 1982 (age 44); New York City, U.S.
- Occupations: Model; actress
- Years active: 1995–present
- Spouse: James Bailey (m. 2011)
- Children: 4
- Parent: Hiroaki Aoki (father)
- Relatives: Steve Aoki (half-brother); Yumi Nu (niece)
- Modeling information
- Height: 5 ft 5 in (1.65 m)
- Hair color: Brunette
- Eye color: Brown

Devon Edwenna Aoki (born August 10, 1982) is an American model and actress. Aoki's film roles include 2 Fast 2 Furious (2003), D.E.B.S. (2004), Sin City (2005), DOA: Dead or Alive (2006), War (2007) and Mutant Chronicles (2008).

== Early life ==
Aoki grew up in New York City, Malibu, California, and London, England. She attended high school at The American School in London.

Her father was former wrestler and Benihana restaurant magnate Rocky Aoki, and her mother is Pamela Hilburger, a jewelry designer. Her father was Japanese and her mother is of German and English ancestry. She started modeling when she was 13, the same year her godmother introduced her to Kate Moss. She has an older sister and a younger brother, as well as four half-siblings, including Steve Aoki. Aoki is also the aunt of fellow model Yumi Nu.

== Career ==
=== Fashion ===
Following her runway debut in 1997, Aoki walked for brands including Balenciaga, Comme des Garçons and Chanel. In 1998, at the age of 16, Aoki replaced Naomi Campbell as the face of Versace. She has also been featured in advertising campaigns for Chanel, Yves Saint Laurent, Kenzo, Hugo Boss, L'Oreal, Lancome and Tiffany & Co., and walked for designers including Versace, Chanel, Oscar de la Renta, Diane von Furstenberg, Jean Paul Gaultier, Celine, Baby Phat, and Marc Jacobs.

Aoki has graced the covers of numerous international fashion magazines, including US' Ocean Drive, Vegas, Nylon, i-D, Interview, Elle Girl; UK's Wonderland; Korea's Cosmo Girl; France's Jalouse; Australia's Russh and 10 Magazine; Japan's Voce and Harper's Bazaar; and Malaysia's Her World. Additionally, Aoki has appeared on the covers of Vogue (America, Germany, Russia, Japan, Korea) and Numéro (Tokyo). In 2006, she posed for Singaporean photographer Leslie Kee for the charity photo-book Super Stars, which was dedicated to the victims of the 2004 Asian tsunami disaster.

In September 2007, she designed a capsule collection for Levi's Asian market called Levi's +D. Aoki described the collaboration by saying: "It's called Levi's + D, the D is for Devon. We're doing everything from denim to swimwear – you name it! I get inspired by vintage pieces you can't really get anymore." In 2017, she returned to the runway for Moschino's fashion show and appeared in advertising campaigns for "Sephora x Moschino" and Hugo Boss. In 2018, Aoki walked the runway for Jeremy Scott's eponymous brand, starred in an editorial for American Vogue and appeared in advertising campaigns for Moschino Fragrance, Nordstrom and Swarovski. In September 2019, she appeared in Harper's Bazaar's "Bazaar Icons 2019" issue, photographed by Mario Sorrenti.

=== Acting ===
As an actress she has appeared in the films 2 Fast 2 Furious, D.E.B.S., Sin City, Dead or Alive, War, Mutant Chronicles and Rosencrantz and Guildenstern Are Undead. She was cast as Tatsu Yamashiro in Arrow season 3, but was replaced by Rila Fukushima due to a scheduling conflict. She appeared briefly in the documentary films I'll Sleep When I'm Dead, about her brother Steve, and Jeremy Scott: The People's Designer.

== Impact ==
She is considered an icon in the fashion industry by models.com. In 2017, Dominic Cadogan of Dazed called Aoki a "cult model" and "one of the most recognizable alternative faces of the 90s". Cadogan continued by saying, "by the time she was 16, she was one of the most in-demand girls of the moment, with some of the industry's top photographers (including Juergen Teller, Ellen von Unwerth and Nick Knight) all transforming her in their images." In April 2019, Marie Claire listed her as one of the 15 supermodels of the 2000s who changed the face of fashion. L'Officiel USA called her "an eternal fashion It-girl", whilst i-D magazine wrote that Aoki is "one of those few faces that defined the turn of the millennium", and listed seven of Aoki's most iconic outfits.

In February 2019, Wonderland magazine reported that singer Rihanna channeled Aoki's look from the action film 2 Fast 2 Furious for her Fenty Beauty campaign. In the film, Aoki's character Suki drives her custom pink Honda S2000 wearing a white top and pink jeans.

== Personal life ==
Devon Aoki is married to James Bailey, and they have one son and three daughters. She retired from full-time film acting in 2009 to focus on motherhood. Her daughter Alessandra appeared in Guess Kids' spring 2018 advertising campaign. Model and singer-songwriter Yumi Nu is Aoki's niece.

She modeled during the third annual charity fashion show presented by General Motors on February 24, 2004. Aoki and her half-brother Steve co-chaired the 2018 Red Cross Gala in San Francisco in March 2018.

== Filmography ==
| Year | Title | Role | Notes |
|---|---|---|---|
| 2003 | Death of a Dynasty | Picasso | |
| 2003 | 2 Fast 2 Furious | Suki | |
| 2004 | D.E.B.S. | Dominique | |
| 2005 | Sin City | Miho | Nominated—Critics' Choice Award for Best Acting Ensemble |
| 2006 | Sean Lennon's Friendly Fire | Mermaid | |
| 2006 | DOA: Dead or Alive | Kasumi | |
| 2006 | Zoom | Daravia | |
| 2007 | War | Kira Yanagawa | |
| 2008 | Mutant Chronicles | Valerie Duval | |
| 2009 | Rosencrantz and Guildenstern Are Undead | Anna | |
| 2015 | Jeremy Scott: The People's Designer | Herself | Documentary film |
| 2016 | I'll Sleep When I'm Dead | Herself | Documentary film |

=== Music videos ===
| Year | Title | Artist |
|---|---|---|
| 1997 | "Electric Barbarella" | Duran Duran |
| 1997 | "Kowalski" | Primal Scream |
| 2003 | "Act a Fool" | Ludacris |
| 2003 | "In Those Jeans" | Ginuwine |
| 2006 | "Dead Meat" | Sean Lennon |
| 2006 | "Bones" | The Killers |
| 2013 | "Just Another Girl" | The Killers |
| 2016 | "M.I.L.F. $" | Fergie |
| 2018 | "Waste It on Me" | Steve Aoki feat. BTS |
