= Global Air (Australian airline) =

Charter airline based in Brisbane, Queensland, Australia

IATA	ICAO	Call sign
—	GAG	GLOBAL AIRGROUP
- Commenced operations: 1997
- Ceased operations: 2005
- Headquarters: Brisbane, Queensland, Australia

Global Air was a charter airline based in Brisbane, Queensland, Australia. It operated on-demand special passenger and cargo charters using Boeing 747 aircraft. It also operated for other airlines on a wet-lease or A.C.M.I. (Aircraft Crew Maintenance & Insurance included) basis often sub-leased to other operators.

== Code data ==
- ICAO Code: GAG

== History ==
The airline was established and started operations in 1997 and ceased all operations in January 2005. In May 2005, the Australian Securities and Investments Commission banned Luke Norman Butler, a director of the company, from managing corporations for a period of three years. The Commission found that Butler held a management position in We Both Pty Ltd (formerly Global Air Leasing Pty Ltd) whilst he was an undischarged bankrupt, and thereby allegedly breached some provisions of the Corporations Act 2001. Butler was not a resident of Australia and was not present at the time of the ASIC hearing, electing instead to make a written submission to ASIC.

Luke Norman Butler's bankruptcy was formally annulled via Annulment of Bankruptcy No VB 390 of 2002 dated 17 September 2003 – some 20 months after Butler's Annulment of Bankruptcy ASIC ruled against Butler effectively finding him guilty, in absentia, of undefended allegations of conduct which happened in a Bankruptcy which was previously annulled (not discharged but annulled i.e. legally as if it never happened). Luke Butler is currently a director of several Australian and International companies.

== Fleet ==
The Global Air fleet consisted of the following aircraft (in 2004):

- 1 Boeing 747 SP
- 1 Boeing 747-200SF

All aircraft have been disposed of as at December 2005.

== See also ==
- List of defunct airlines of Australia
- Aviation in Australia
