= Larry Newman (aviator) =

American aviator (1947–2010)

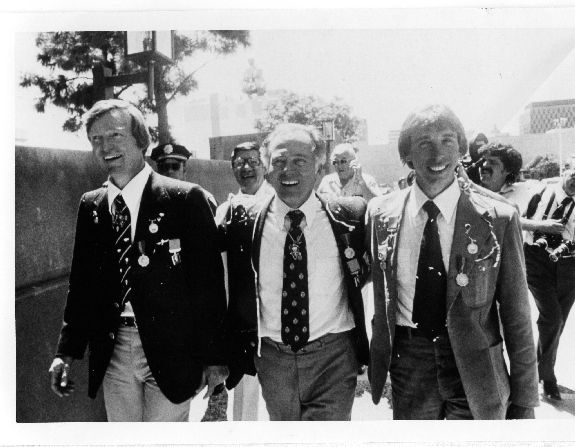
- L to R: Maxie Anderson, Ben Abruzzo, & Newman of the Double Eagle II
- Born: September 28, 1947; Los Angeles, California, US
- Died: December 20, 2010 (aged 63); Scottsdale, Arizona, US
- Occupations: Pilot, Founder of Electra Flyer Corporation and American Aerolights
- Known for: Flying the first balloon across the Atlantic, the Double Eagle II; Flying the first balloon across the Pacific, the Double Eagle V

Larry Newman (September 28, 1947 – December 20, 2010) was an American pilot, business man, and balloonist. He was part of the balloon crews that made the first Atlantic ocean crossing by balloon in the Double Eagle II and the first Pacific ocean crossing by balloon in the Double Eagle V.

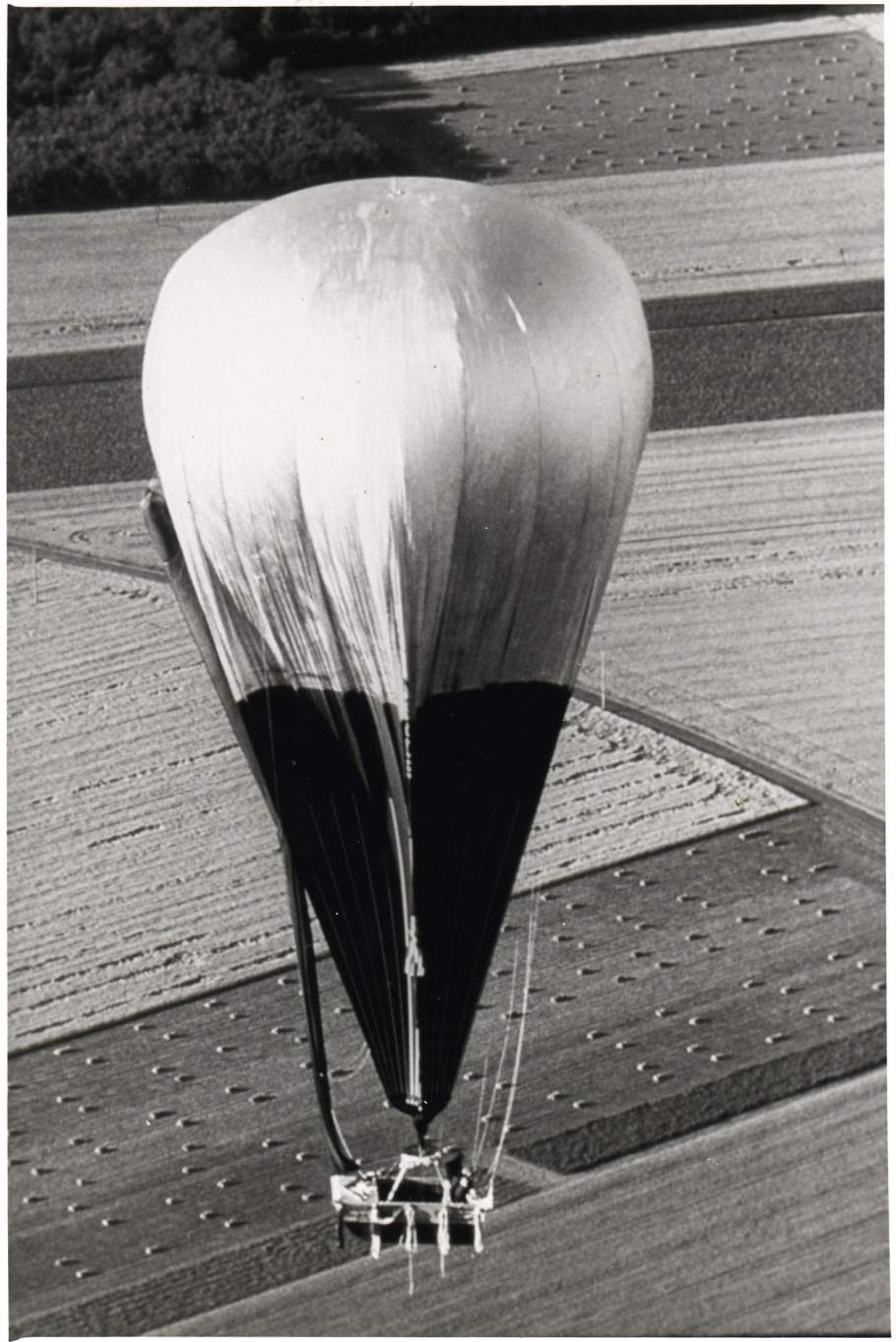
The gas balloon Double Eagle II over Presque Isle, Maine attempting to cross the Atlantic

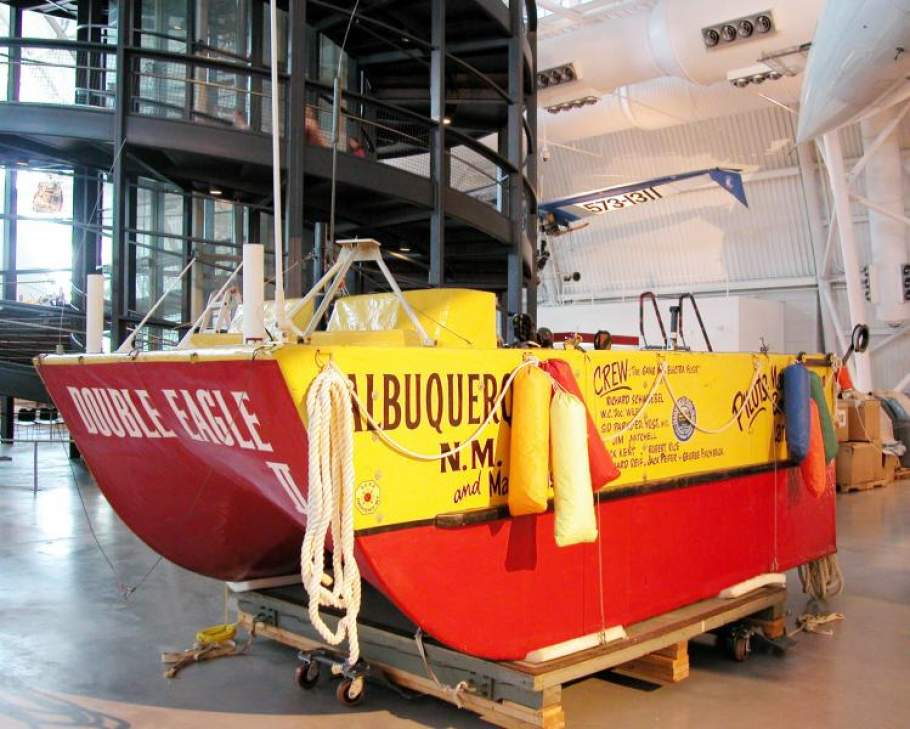
Double Eagle Gondola

== Double Eagle II ==
Newman won the Congressional Gold Medal awarded by the United States Congress for his flight in the Double Eagle II. The Double Eagle II, piloted by Ben Abruzzo, Maxie Anderson, and Larry Newman, became the first balloon to cross the Atlantic Ocean when it landed 17 August 1978 in Miserey near Paris, 137 hours 6 minutes after leaving Presque Isle, Maine. The flight was the first manned balloon crossing of the Atlantic non-stop.

== Double Eagle V ==
In November 1981, Newman flew the Double Eagle V in the first successful manned balloon crossing of the Pacific with Ben Abruzzo, Ron Clark and Rocky Aoki. They launched from Nagashima, Japan on November 10, 1981, and landed in Mendocino National Forest in California 84 hours and 31 minutes later, covering a record 5,768 miles (9,283 km). The four-man crew included fellow Albuquerque balloonists Ben Abruzzo & Ron Clark, and restaurateur Rocky Aoki, who partially funded the flight. After crossing the Pacific the helium-filled Double Eagle V, weighed down by ice and buffeted by a storm, crash-landed in northern California, ending the nearly 6,000-mile flight. No one was hurt.

== Life ==
Newman helped popularize hang gliding with his company Electra Flyer Corporation, which produced thousands of hang gliders at its peak. He also founded ultralight aircraft manufacturer American Aerolights in 1979.

In 1985, Newman sold his business and became a pilot for America West Airlines.

Newman attempted to circumnavigate the globe by balloon partnering with former cosmonaut Vladimir Dzhanibekov. Newman envisioned flying a NASA designed sky anchor balloon. This unique hourglass shaped design used a zero pressure helium balloon for buoyancy and a superpressure balloon for variable ballast. Manufactured by Raven Industries the double balloon system together measured 354 feet (108 m) tall. From Tillamook, Oregon on 8 September 1990, a proof of concept flight was made by Dzhanibekov, Newman, Tim Lachenmeier, and Don Moses. Moses replaced Richard Branson who was unable to make a weather window departure time. Flying 31 hours thru two nights and landing at Omak, Washington proved the sky anchor balloon worked as manufactured. Dzhanibekov, Larry Newman, and Don Moses piloted the Earthwinds Hilton balloon which was primarily sponsored by Barron Hilton. In 1992 an attempt from Akron, Ohio did not launch due to strong winds. The next attempt was a planned pre-dawn launch but was delayed for several hours by difficulties inflating both balloons. Launching later than desired, on 13 January 1993 the Earthwinds liftoff from Reno Stead Airport flew for 30 minutes before crashing. After liftoff the Earthwinds balloon could not penetrate a strong inversion layer and tore the ballast balloon on a mountain peak. The three crewmen survived the crash without injuries. An additional flight on 31 December 1994 reached 29,000 feet (8,800 m) when the ballast balloon failed. These sky anchor balloon failures influenced other circumnavigation attempts to use a Roziere balloon system.

Shortly after Earthwinds, Newman divorced his wife Lynne. He left America West Airlines in 1997. Newman suffered multiple injuries in a skydiving accident when colliding with another parachutist on approach to the landing area. He broke multiple bones and nearly lost his eyesight.
