= Gasho of Japan =

American steakhouse chain

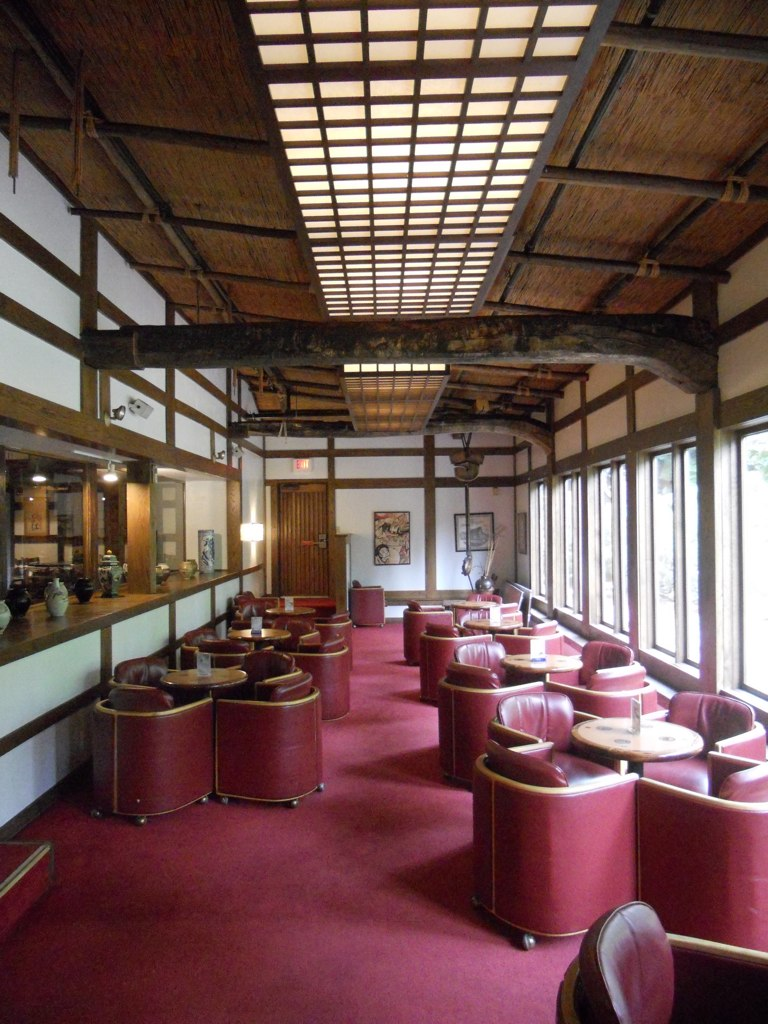
- View of lounge area at Gasho of Japan, Central Valley, taken August 9, 2012
- Founded: 1971
- Headquarters: United States

Gasho of Japan (also Gasho Hibachi Steakhouse) was a chain of Japanese-style steakhouse restaurants located in Central Valley, New York, Hawthorne, New York, Hauppauge, New York, Ridgefield, New Jersey, and Denver, Colorado. Restaurants were known for teppanyaki steak dinners and entertaining chefs performing theatrical knife-work. In 2003, five Gasho of Japan restaurants were doing business under the name.

The original Gasho of Japan restaurants were opened by Shiro Aoki, younger brother of Hiroaki "Rocky" Aoki, who opened the first Benihana restaurants in the United States.

== Former locations ==
A Gasho Hibachi Steakhouse inside a replica Gasshou-style farmhouse operated in Central Valley, New York, from 1971 to 2017. Their last remaining location in Hauppauge, New York closed in late-2025.

Gasho of Japan restaurants also operated in the Denver metropolitan area. A downtown location opened in 1973, overseen by restaurateur Kenny Sonoda. A second location opened in 1978 inside a replica Gasshou-style Japanese farmhouse in the Denver Technological Center.

== See also ==
- Benihana
- Teppanyaki
- List of Japanese restaurants
