= Benihana =

American Japanese cuisine restaurant company

Benihana Inc.
- Type: Subsidiary
- Industry: Restaurant Franchising
- Founded: 1964; 62 years ago
- Founder: Rocky Aoki
- Headquarters: Aventura, Florida (United States); Benihana Bldg. 9th Floor, Chuo-ku, Tokyo (Japan), United States & Japan
- Number of locations: 89 stores (2024)
- Key people: Manny Hilario (CEO and President)
- Products: Japanese cuisine
- Revenue: ▲US$314M (FY 2023)
- Operating income: ▲−US$13.24M (FY 2024)
- Net income: ▼ −US$0.6M (FY 2024)
- Total assets: ▼US$309M(FY 2024)
- Total equity: ▼US$66M(FY 2024)
- Number of employees: 7,400
- Parent: One Group Hospitality Inc.; (2024–present)
- Divisions: Benihana, Samurai, Haru, RA Sushi
- Website: www.benihana.com

Benihana (Japanese: 紅花; "Safflower") is a chain of Japanese restaurants. Originally founded by Yunosuke Aoki as a cafe in Tokyo in 1945, Benihana spread to the United States in 1964 when his son Hiroaki "Rocky" Aoki opened its first restaurant in New York City.

Benihana Inc., based in Aventura, Florida, owns 68 Japanese teppanyaki restaurants, including its flagship Benihana Teppanyaki brand, and 12 more franchises in the United States, the Caribbean and Central and South America. Additionally, it owns one Samurai restaurant and 19 RA Sushi restaurants in the United States. It is one of the largest Asian restaurant chains in the United States by sales. Benihana was acquired by One Group, parent company of the STK and Kona Grill chains, in February 2024 for $365 million.

Benihana introduced the teppanyaki restaurant concept which originated in Japan in the late 1940s to the United States, and later to other countries.

The original Benihana location in Tokyo is part of Benihana Inc. (株式会社 紅花), a Japanese company, which also owns the Benihana Building in Nihonbashi and the Aoki Tower in Ginza.

== History ==
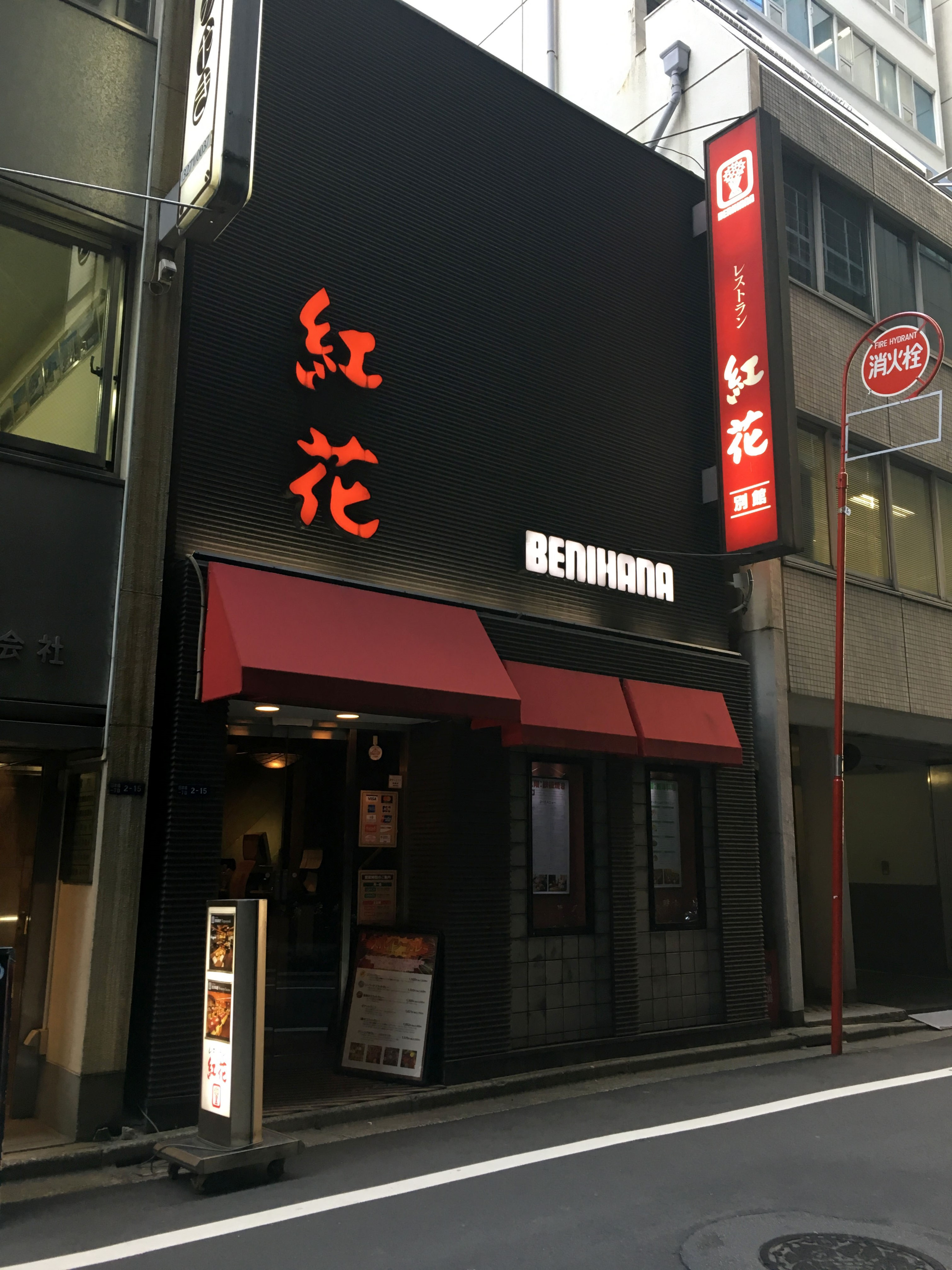
Benihana Bekkan in Nihonbashi, Tokyo, the first Benihana teppanyaki restaurant.

=== Japan ===
Yunosuke Aoki founded a jazz café called "Ellington" in the Nihonbashi district of Tokyo in 1937. The café was destroyed during the firebombing of Tokyo in 1945 and reopened in 1947 as a coffee shop called Benihana. Aoki opened a restaurant on the second floor in 1950. In 1955, he opened a teppanyaki restaurant across the street, now known as Benihana Bekkan. This was followed by a Ginza location in 1956, which closed in 1997 and was demolished to make way for the Aoki Tower office building. The original Benihana Bekkan location closed on December 27, 2025, with plans to reopen at a new location in the future.

=== United States ===
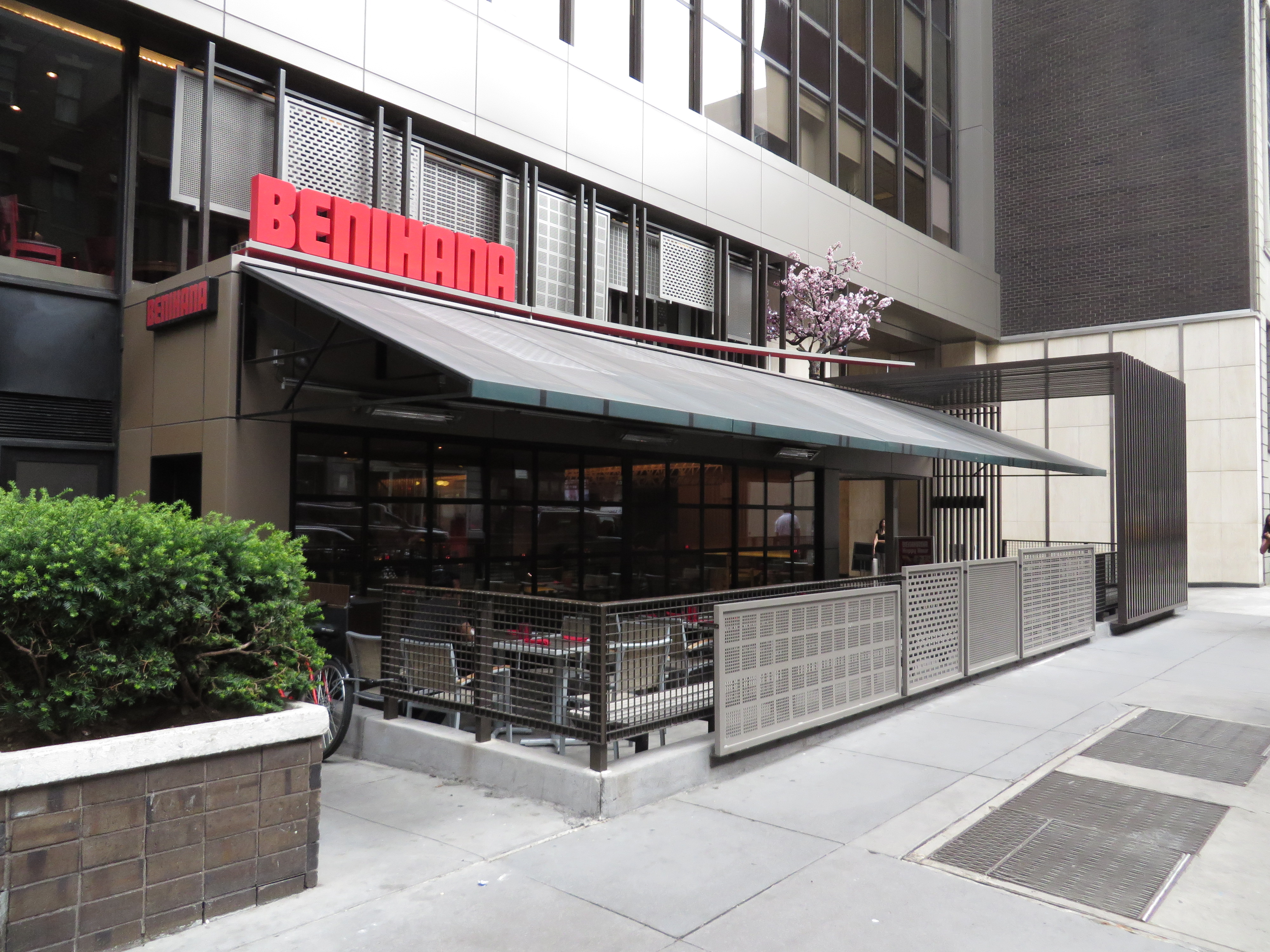
Benihana on West 56th Street in New York City

The first American Benihana location was in 1964 on West 56th Street in New York City opened by 25-year-old Hiroaki Aoki, the son of Yunosuke Aoki and father of Steve Aoki and Devon Aoki. Aoki, a wrestler who had qualified for but did not attend the 1960 Summer Olympics, started the restaurant with US$10,000 (equivalent to $103,809 in 2025) earned from driving an ice cream truck in Harlem.

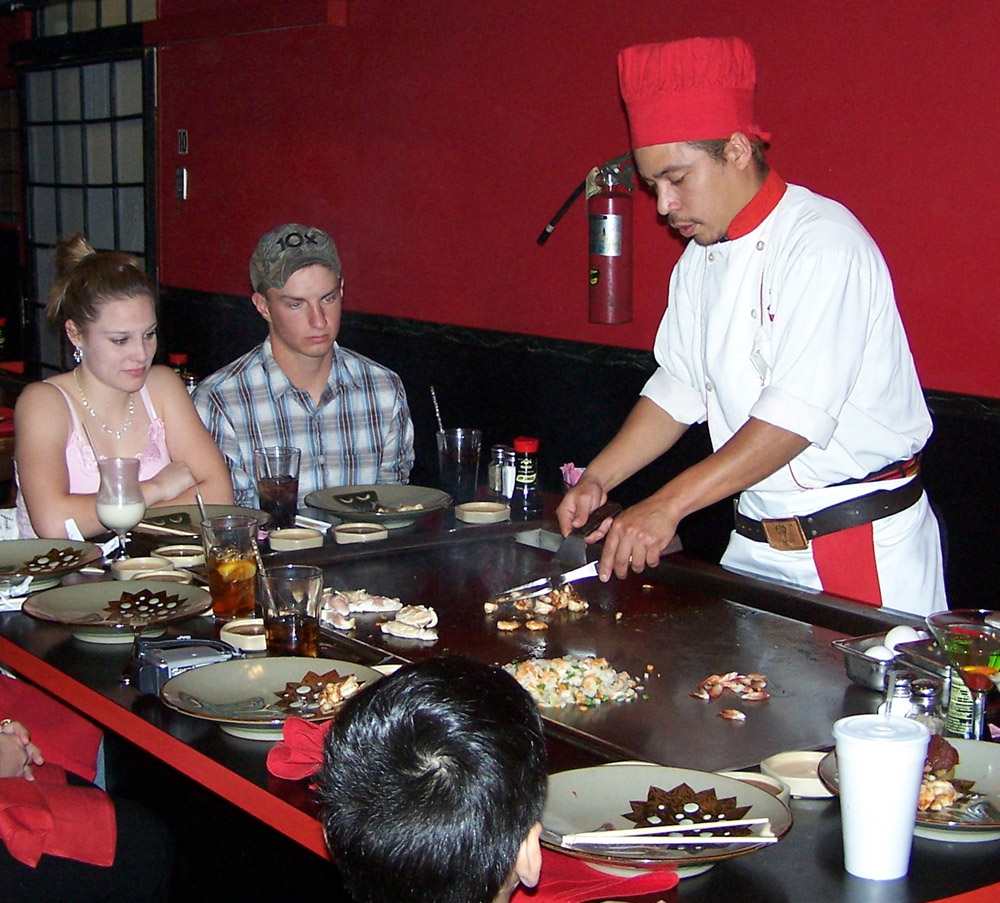
A chef preparing a dinner at the table

Aoki's concept was for the meals to be theatrically prepared by a knife-wielding, joke-telling chef at a teppanyaki table surrounded by a wooden eating surface in front of the guests (teppan meaning "steel grill" or "griddle" and yaki meaning "grilled" or "broiled"). It did not do well until early 1965, when Clementine Paddleford of the New York Herald Tribune gave it a rave review. The Beatles and Muhammad Ali were among the celebrities who patronized the four-table restaurant.

In 1968, it opened its first restaurant outside of New York City in Chicago.

In 1983, Aoki spun off 11 Benihana U.S. restaurants into a separate company, Benihana Inc., and sold 49.1% to the public. He maintained full control over the 39 non-U.S. restaurants through his original company, Benihana of Tokyo.

The company had some missteps including the opening of the upscale Big Splash restaurant and a frozen food division, Benihana National Classics. Its stock dove and shareholders sued over management including the fact that Aoki still had his privately held restaurants of the same name. In 1995, the company acquired 17 restaurants from Benihana of Tokyo.

Following a guilty plea for insider trading in 1999, which would have led to the revocation of Benihana's liquor licenses, Rocky Aoki ceded control of Benihana of Tokyo and Benihana Inc. to a trust managed by his children and personal lawyer.

The company has since expanded by purchasing the Haru and RA Sushi restaurants, which operate under the same names. Haru is based in New York City; RA has locations across the country, and is based in Scottsdale, Arizona, with its original four locations scattered around the greater Phoenix area. Although Benihana owns these concepts, they are independently operated and were developed autonomously. It also acquired the Samurai and Kyoto restaurants which it has incorporated into its other brands.

In 2004, the company issued a class of preferred stock to BFC Financial corporation to renovate its restaurants and expand. The stock diluted Aoki's control of the chain and the family sued, citing that Benihana had no compelling need for the cash, other forms of capital were available, and that the terms of the preferred stock issued to BFC were onerous. A member of the board of directors was also a director of BFC, a company that held controlling interests in BankAtlantic, Blue Green, and Levitt Homes. However, the Delaware Court of Chancery upheld the transaction.

Aoki died in 2008 at the age of 69.

In 2009, Richard C. Stockinger became chief executive to replace Joel A. Schwartz, and in 2010 became president as Juan C. Garcia resigned.

Benihana agreed in 2012 to be purchased by the private equity firm of Angelo Gordon & Company for $296 million.

On February 5, 2014, the Board of Directors of Benihana Inc. named Steve Shlemon the company's new president and chief executive officer.

In 2016, Benihana Inc. named Thomas J. Baldwin CEO and president. Baldwin had been director of Benihana and served as an advisor to the operator's principal investor, Angelo, Gordon & Co.

In 2023, Benihana was exploring a possible sale that could value the chain at $600 million or more.

In 2024, Benihana was acquired by One Group Hospitality Inc. One Group completed the deal in February 2024 for $365 million in cash, acquiring 86 Benihana locations, as well as Benihana's 19 Ra Sushi restaurants. Subsequently, president and CEO of One Group, Emanuel “Manny” Hilario, also assumed the role of president and CEO of Benihana the same year.

=== Lawsuits ===
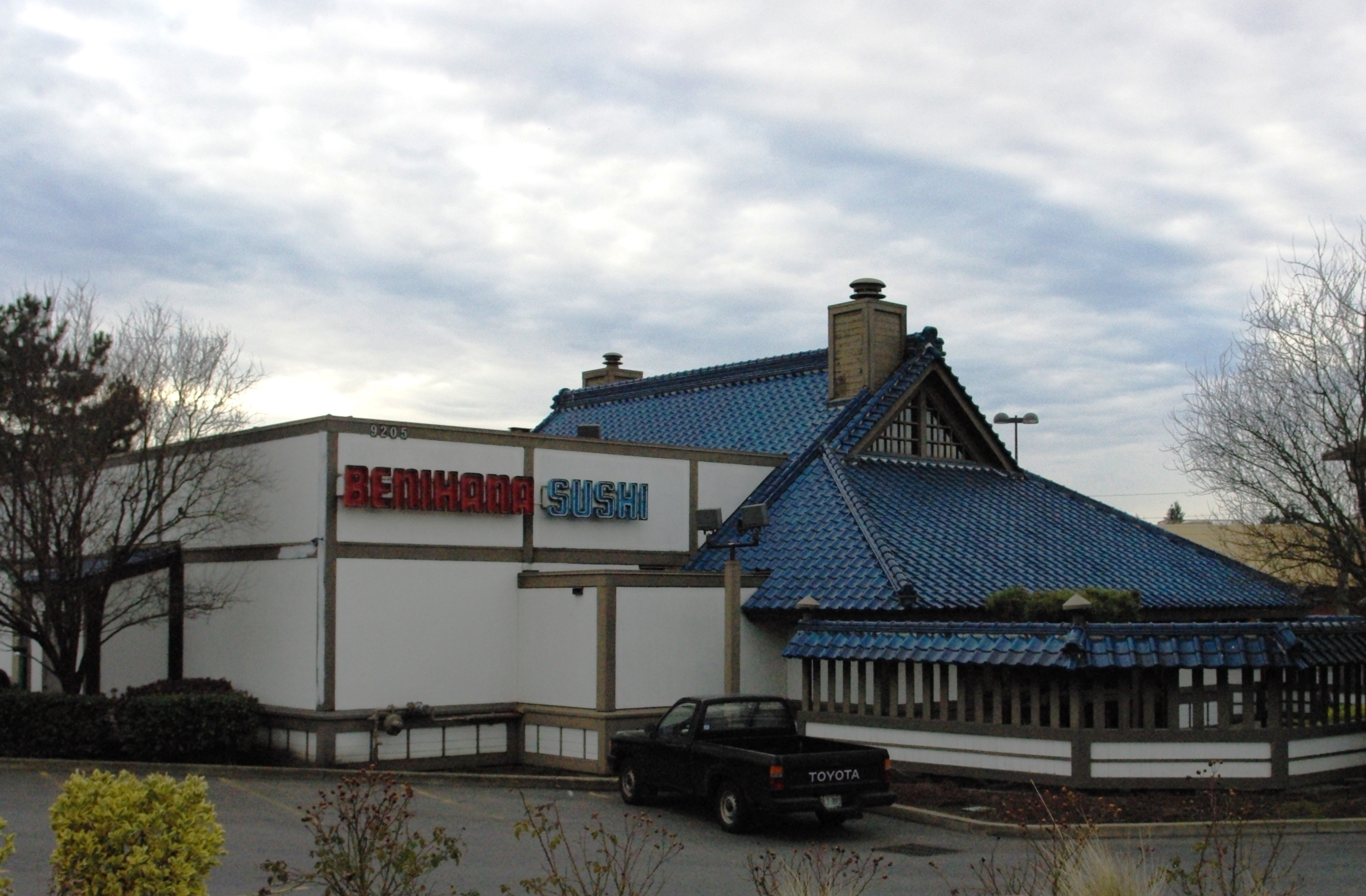
Benihana in Beaverton, Oregon

In Benihana of Tokyo, Inc. v. Benihana, Inc., financial issues and a change of corporate control led three of the members of the Benihana, Inc.'s board of directors to consider the issuance of convertible stock and its sale to a potential buyer. Eventually, the entire board approved resolutions ratifying a stock purchase agreement with the buyer and authorizing the stock issuance. Afterwards, the company filed an action against almost all of Benihana, Inc.'s directors, alleging breaches of fiduciary duties.

On January 30, 2011, Benihana (Kuwait) filed a defamation lawsuit against a blogger for writing about his experience on his website. Las Palmas, the company that owns Benihana in Kuwait, took legal action against the reviewer for his "negative" attitudes towards the restaurant and for recording the videos without permission. The company alleged that the blogger worked for an advertising company and might have personal motives that could be linked to his work to denigrate Benihana and praise its competitors located in the same area.

== International locations ==
Benihana operates or franchises restaurants in the United States, the United Kingdom, Slovakia, Romania, the Middle East, the Caribbean, Central and South America.

- North America
  - Canada
  - El Salvador
  - Mexico
  - Panama
  - United States
- South America
  - Brazil
- Europe
  - France
  - Romania
  - United Kingdom
- Middle East
  - Kuwait
  - Lebanon
  - Qatar
  - Saudi Arabia
  - United Arab Emirates
- South Asia
  - India
- Southeast Asia
  - Indonesia
  - Malaysia
  - Singapore
  - Thailand

== See also ==
- Gasho of Japan
- List of Japanese restaurants
- List of sushi restaurants
