= Utilicraft FF-1080 =

FF-1080

General information
- Type: Utility and cargo aircraft
- National origin: United States
- Manufacturer: Utilicraft Aerospace Industries
- Number built: 0

The FF-1080 is an aircraft design by Utilicraft Aerospace Industries of Albuquerque, New Mexico, USA, for a twin turboprop aircraft fitted to carry LD3 aircraft cargo containers between large airports and smaller airports.

Twin Pratt & Whitney Canada PW150C turboprop engines driving 6-bladed propellers provide the STOL performance with takeoff runs of less than 3,000 ft (914 m). The aircraft is designed to carry as much as 20,000 lb (9,100 kg) for a 3,200-nautical-mile (5,900 km) range carrying beneath its 1,315 square feet (122.2 m^{2}) of high-mounted wings.

American Utilicraft, the predecessor of Utilicraft Aerospace Industries, patented the design for the FF-1080 in 1991. Prototype engineering began in 2000 at Aircraft Design Services Incorporated in San Antonio, Texas. A company called Micro Craft was chosen to build the prototype, with plans to build subassemblies at a factory in Huntsville, Alabama, and to assemble the prototype at Gwinnett Airport in Atlanta.

American Utilicraft entered a memorandum of understanding with the San Juan Pueblo (now known as Ohkay Owingeh) to build a production aircraft assembly plant in northern New Mexico. The pueblo is the owner of Ohkay Owingeh Airport. State officials encouraged the companies and the pueblo to seek state loans to begin production of the aircraft.

== Variants ==
FF-1080 Freight Feeder
base-line freighter, planned and designed from the early 1990s; not built.
FF-1080-100
short fuselage version for 4 LD3 containers, powered by 2 Pratt & Whitney Canada PW121 turboprop engines; not built.
FF-1080-200
initial standard version, 2 Pratt & Whitney Canada PW122, 6 LD3 containers; not built.
FF-1080-300ER
base-line version from December 2004, carrying up to 10 LD3 or 5 A-1 containers; not built.
FF-1080-500
enlarged version, re-designated FF5000; not built.
FF4000
proposed shrink for 4 M-1 containers / 11,340 kg (25,000 lb) payload; not built.
FF5000
standard version from 2008, 6 M-1 containers, renamed FF5000; not built.

== Specifications (FF5000) ==
Data from Jane's all the World's Aircraft 2010–11

General characteristics

- Crew: 2
- Length: 116 ft 0 in (35.36 m)
- Wingspan: 114 ft 7 in (34.93 m)
- Height: 36 ft 8 in (11.18 m)
- Wing area: 1,315 sq ft (122.2 m^{2})
- Empty weight: 40,612 lb (18,421 kg)
- Max takeoff weight: 85,800 lb (38,918 kg)
- Fuel capacity: 22,500 lb (10,206 kg) maximum
- Powerplant: 2 × Pratt & Whitney Canada PW150A turboprop engines, 5,071 shp (3,781 kW) each
- Propellers: 6-bladed Hamilton Standard NP 2000 fully-feathering reversible constant speed propellers

Performance

- Maximum speed: 270 kn (310 mph, 500 km/h)
- Cruise speed: 250 kn (290 mph, 460 km/h) normal

230 kn (260 mph; 430 km/h) economical

- Stall speed: 91 kn (105 mph, 169 km/h) flaps down
- Range: 2,175 nmi (2,503 mi, 4,028 km) with 5,000 lb (2,268 kg) payload

878 nmi (1,010 mi; 1,626 km) with maximum payload

- Service ceiling: 25,000 ft (7,600 m) maximum certified
- Take-off run: 3,500 ft (1,067 m)
- Landing run: 2,950 ft (899 m)
