= Ben Abruzzo =

American balloonist (1930–1985)

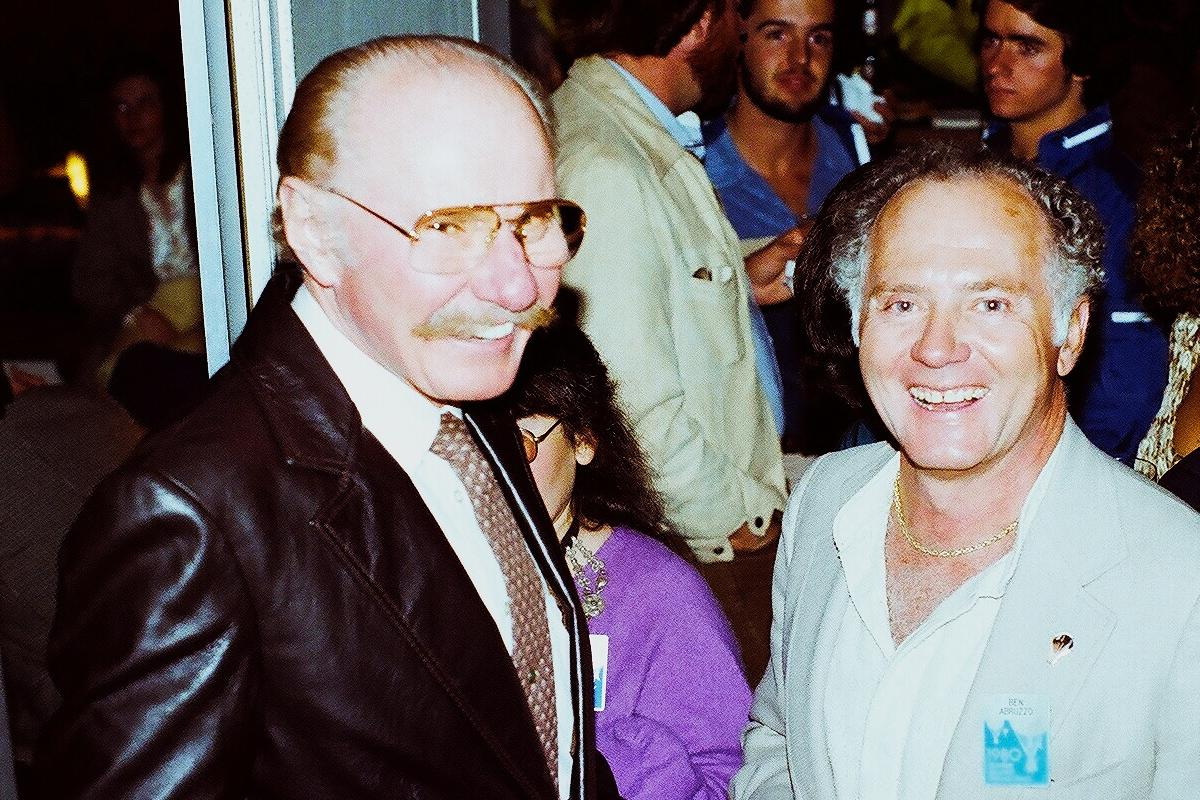
- Ben Abruzzo and Bob Hoover at the 1980 Gordon Bennett survivors' banquet at the Queen Mary
- Born: June 9, 1930; Rockford, Illinois, U.S.
- Died: February 11, 1985 (aged 54); Albuquerque, New Mexico, U.S.
- Cause of death: Ballooning accident
- Resting place: Gate of Heaven Cemetery Albuquerque, New Mexico
- Education: B.S. Business Administration, University of Illinois
- Occupations: Chairman & president>br>Real estate developer
- Employers: Alvarado Realty Company; Sandia Peak Ski Company
- Known for: First Atlantic ocean crossing by balloon in the Double Eagle II; First Pacific ocean crossing by balloon in the Double Eagle V
- Spouse: Patty Abruzzo
- Children: 4, including Richard
- Awards: Congressional Gold Medal; FAI Diplome Montgolfier ballooning's highest honor FAI Gold Air Medal

Benjamin L. Abruzzo (June 9, 1930 – February 11, 1985) was an American balloonist and businessman who helped make Albuquerque, New Mexico, into an international ballooning center. He was part of the balloon crews that made the first Atlantic Ocean crossing by balloon in the Double Eagle II and the first Pacific Ocean crossing by balloon in the Double Eagle V.

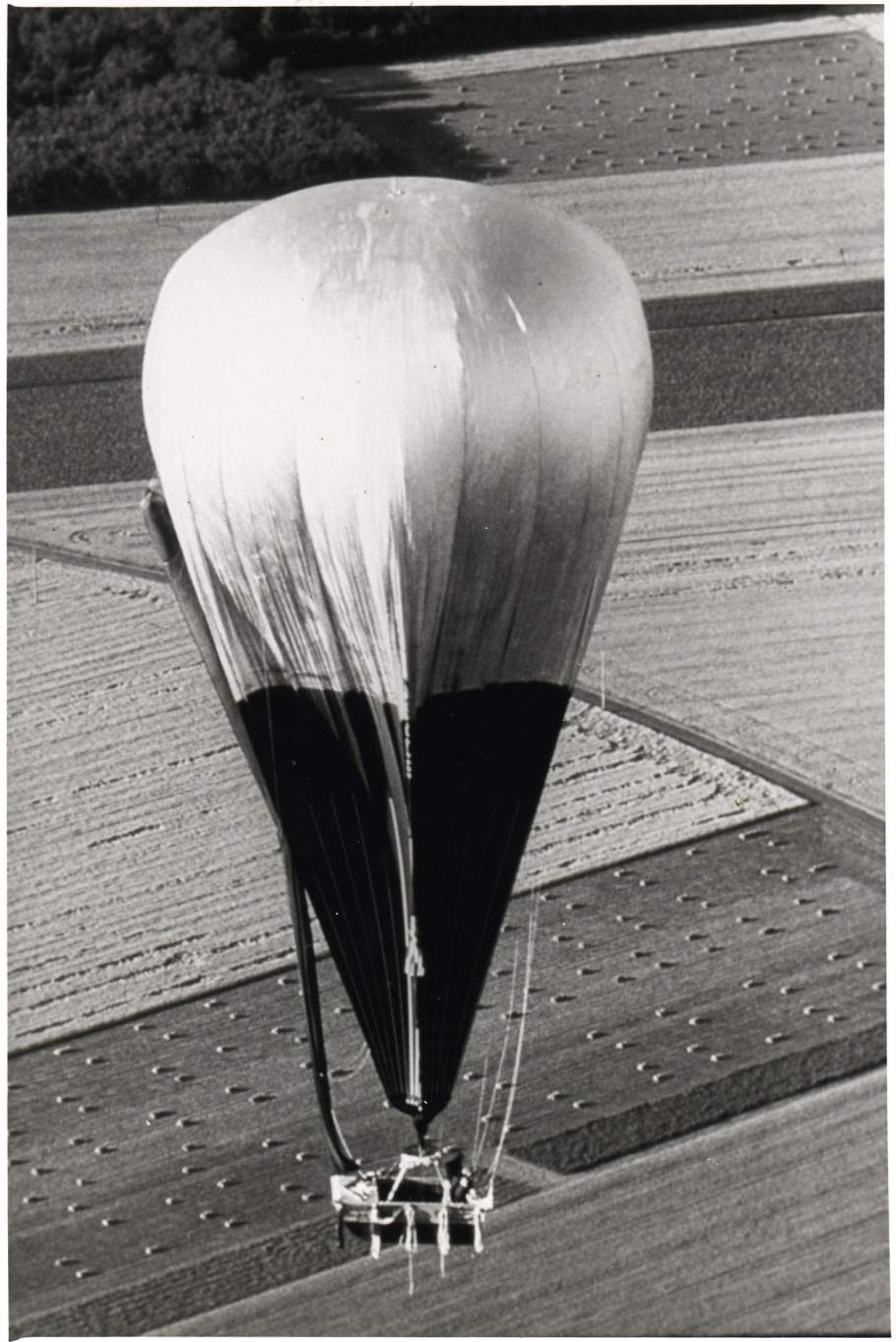
The gas balloon Double Eagle II over Presque Isle, Maine, attempting to cross the Atlantic

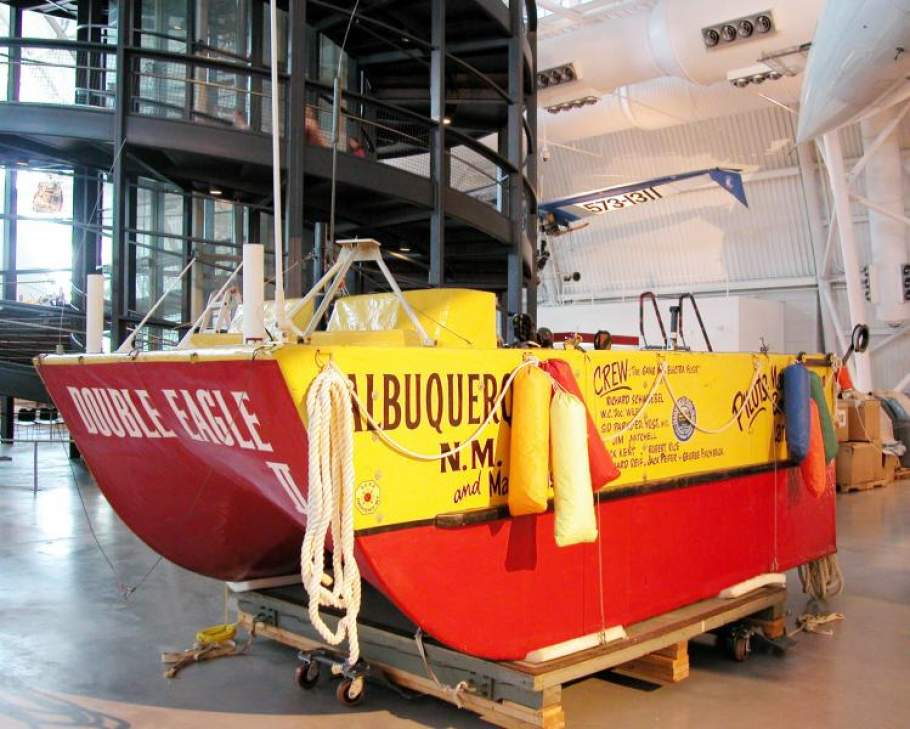
Double Eagle Gondola

== Life ==
Abruzzo was born in Rockford, Illinois. He graduated from the University of Illinois with a BS in business administration in 1952 and commissioned as a lieutenant in the United States Air Force. Abruzzo was stationed at Kirtland Air Force Base, New Mexico; adopting New Mexico as his home state after leaving military service in 1954. After working at Sandia Corporation, he became chairman and president of Alvarado Realty Company and started working with the local ski resort. Abruzzo became chairman and president of Sandia Peak Ski Company, Sandia Peak Tram Company, and Sandia Peak Utility Company. He also developed the Sandia Heights subdivision of homes around the base of the Sandia Tram.

== Albuquerque International Balloon Fiesta ==
Abruzzo took an interest in hot air ballooning in the early 1970s. In 1972, Abruzzo and other local balloon pilots held the first Albuquerque balloon fiesta with just thirteen balloons launching from a shopping mall parking lot. The Albuquerque International Balloon Fiesta is now the largest ballooning event of its kind in the world, with over 600 balloons participating each October.

== Double Eagle ==
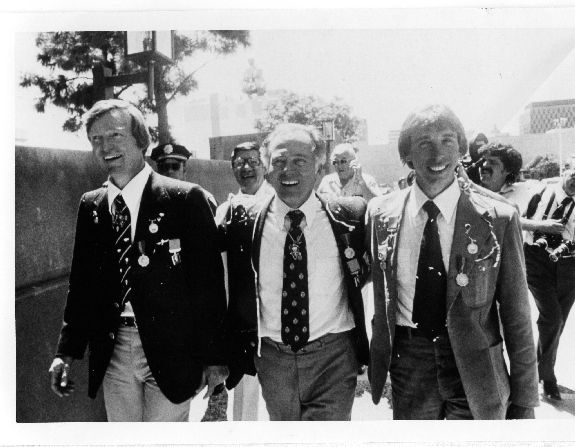
Ben Abruzzo, Maxie Anderson, and Larry Newman of the Double Eagle II

In 1977 Abruzzo and fellow balloonist Maxie Anderson decided to attempt a crossing of the Atlantic Ocean in a helium filled gas balloon named the Double Eagle. The balloon was named in honor of Charles Lindbergh, who in 1927 was the first person to cross the Atlantic Ocean in a small single engined aircraft alone. The flight of the Double Eagle occurred fifty years after Lindbergh's feat, and was the eleventh recorded attempt to make the crossing, which had been an open challenge in ballooning for more than a century. The balloon launched from Marshfield, Massachusetts on September 9. After being blown off course by stormy weather, the team was forced to ditch three miles off the coast of Iceland on September 12, 65 1/2 hours after taking off. Abruzzo suffered exposure and frostbite during the flight and was forced to abandon the attempt.

== Double Eagle II ==
The Abruzzo and Anderson team, this time with Larry Newman, made a second attempt in the Double Eagle II in 1978. The team took off from Presque Isle, Maine on August 11 and made a successful landing in Miserey, France six days later. ABC Sports aired a short form documentary special about the flight hosted by Bob Beatty entitled "The Spirit of '78: The Flight of DOUBLE EAGLE II". For their efforts, the team was awarded the Congressional Gold Medal in 1979. Later that year, Abruzzo and Anderson piloted together to win the first since WWII International Gordon Bennett Race in the balloon "Double Eagle III". The Bennett race was suspended in 1939 due to hostilities, not resuming until 1979, with official Gordon Bennett Cup (ballooning) restart in 1983.

== Double Eagle V ==
Abruzzo was also on the Double Eagle V team. The Double Eagle V was the first team to cross the Pacific Ocean in a gas balloon in November 1981. This flight also set a record for longest trip by a team in a balloon.

== Death and legacy ==
Ben Abruzzo died on 11 February 1985 when the Cessna 421 he was piloting crashed near Albuquerque. Abruzzo's wife and four others also died in the crash. Abruzzo's son, Richard Abruzzo, was also a noted balloonist. He too died in an aviation accident.

Creating a foundation, the Abruzzo and Anderson families partnered with the City of Albuquerque and constructed the Anderson-Abruzzo Albuquerque International Balloon Museum next to the launch field of the Albuquerque International Balloon Fiesta. The world's most photographed event, Fiesta is held the second week of every October.

Abruzzo had partnered with Robert Nordhaus, a retired lawyer and father of Nobel Prize-winning economist William Nordhaus, to purchase the La Madera Ski Area, now known as Sandia Peak Ski Area, from the Albuquerque Ski Club in 1958. Together, they oversaw many improvements to the resort. Two entities at the resort are named for his famous balloon: a ski run, Double Eagle II; and the ski lodge, Double Eagle II Day Lodge.
