= Double Eagle II =

First balloon to cross the Atlantic Ocean

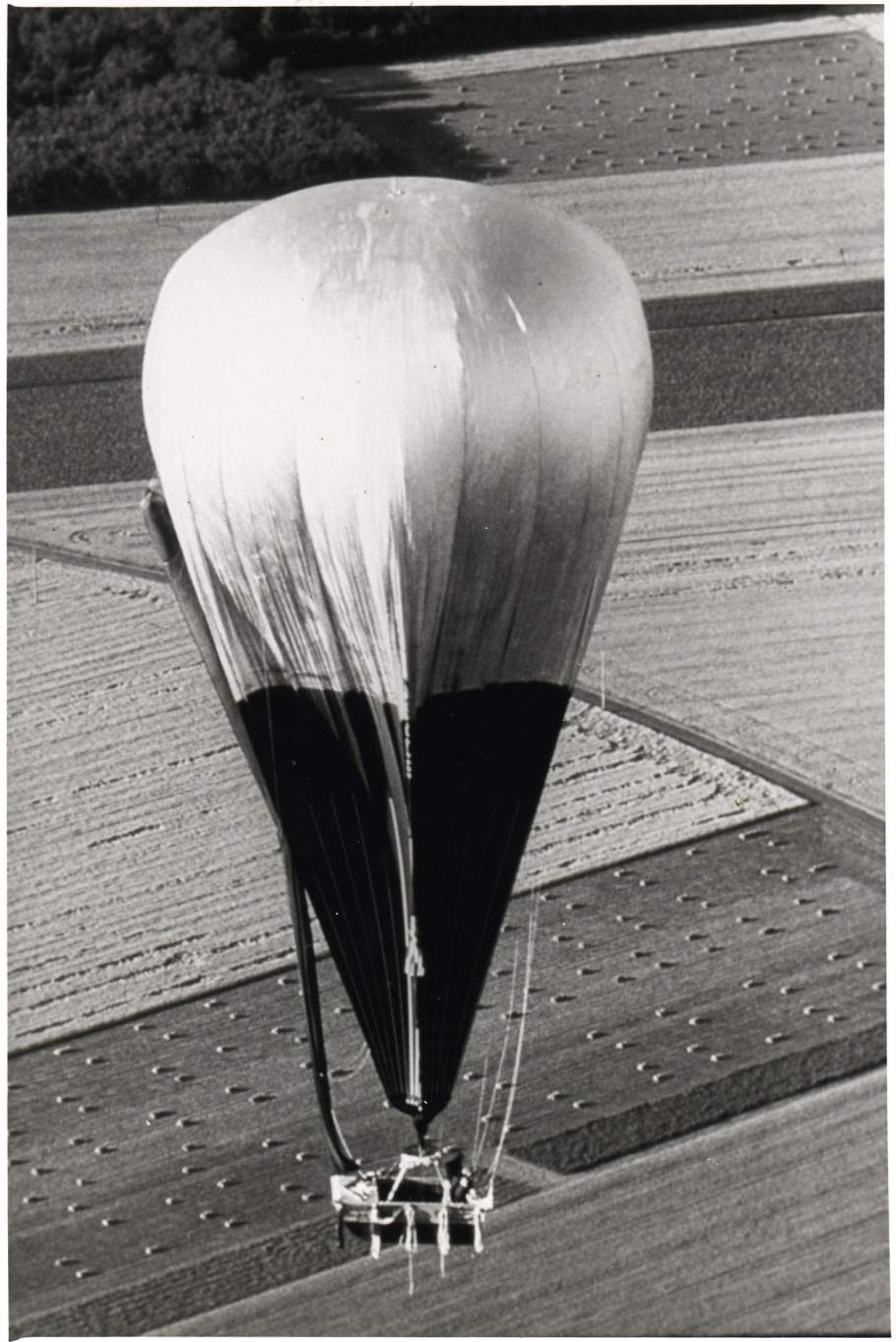
- The gas balloon Double Eagle II over Presque Isle, Maine attempting to cross the Atlantic

General information
- Other name: The Spirit of Albuquerque
- Type: Helium balloon
- Manufacturer: Ed Yost
- Total hours: 137 hours 6 minutes

History
- Last flight: 11 August 1978 - 17 August 1978
- Preserved at: The gondola is displayed at the Steven F. Udvar-Hazy Center of the Smithsonian National Air and Space Museum annex at Washington Dulles International Airport in the Chantilly area of Fairfax County, Virginia, United States.
- Fate: First balloon to cross the Atlantic Ocean

Double Eagle II, piloted by Ben Abruzzo, Maxie Anderson and Larry Newman, became the first balloon to cross the Atlantic Ocean when it landed on 17 August 1978 in Miserey near Paris, 137 hours and 6 minutes after leaving Presque Isle, Maine.

It can be regarded as a successful crossing at the point that the Double Eagle II crossed the Irish coast, on the evening of 16 August, an event that Shannon Airport notified the crew about when it happened. Newman originally intended to hang glide from the balloon to a landing, while Anderson and Abruzzo continued to fly, but the hang-glider had to be dropped as ballast earlier on 16 August. While flying over France, they heard by radio that authorities had closed Le Bourget Airfield, where Charles Lindbergh had landed, for them. The crew declined the offer. They were running out of ballast and it would be too risky (to themselves and anyone below) to pass over the suburbs of Paris. They landed in a field of barley, owned by Roger and Rachel Coquerel, in Miserey, 60 mi (97 km) northwest of Paris. Television images showed a highway nearby, its shoulders and outer lanes crowded with stopped cars, people sweeping across the farm field to the landing spot. The gondola was protected, but most of the logs and charts were stolen by souvenir hunters.

The flight, the 14th known attempt at a transatlantic crossing by balloon, was the culmination of more than a century of previous attempts. Some of the people who had attempted it disappeared en route and were never found. Larry Newman won a draw among the three to sleep in the same bed at the United States Embassy that Lindbergh had slept in. British balloonists Don Cameron and Christopher Davey feted the trio at a party that included a balloon shaped like the Double Eagle II. The trio and their wives had made arrangements to return to the United States aboard the supersonic Concorde and, upon the successful crossing, their Concorde trip was accommodated by Air France at no charge to the trio and spouses.

A full chronicle of the voyage can be found in the December 1978 issue of National Geographic. Double Eagle II Airport in New Mexico is named for the balloon. The gondola is displayed at the Steven F. Udvar-Hazy Center of the Smithsonian National Air and Space Museum annex at Washington Dulles International Airport in the Chantilly area of Fairfax County, Virginia, United States. A monument, containing a model of the balloon, was built to commemorate the Double Eagle II and its Atlantic crossing at the field from where the balloon lifted off (46°37′36.54″N 68°1′16.66″W).

In January 2015, the crew of the Two Eagles Balloon completed a flight across the Pacific Ocean. Their flight duration of 160 hours and 34 minutes record was verified by the Fédération Aéronautique Internationale, officially breaking the time-aloft record of the Double Eagle II.

== Statistics ==
- Builder: Ed Yost; Tea, South Dakota
- Balloon: 160,000 cu ft (4,500 m^{3}) helium-filled; 112 ft (34 m) high, 65 ft (20 m) in diameter
- Gondola: 15 × 7 × 4½ foot; name The Spirit of Albuquerque
- Equipment: 1 VHF radio, 2 single sideband HF radios, 1 ADF beacon transmitter, 1 amateur band radio, 1 maritime radio, hookup to Nimbus 6 satellite.
- Total weight: 760 lb (340 kg) empty
- Take-off: 8:43 p.m. EDT - 11 August (00:42 UTC 12 August)
- Landing: 7:49 p.m. Western Europe Summer Time - 17 August (17:48 UTC 17 August)
- Total flight time: 137 hours, 6 minutes (5.7 days)
- Lowest altitude: 3,500 feet (1,070 m) - 13 August
- Highest altitude: 24,950 feet (7,605 m) - 16 August
- Total distance: 4,988 km (3,099 mi)
- Average speed: 22 mph (35 km/h)
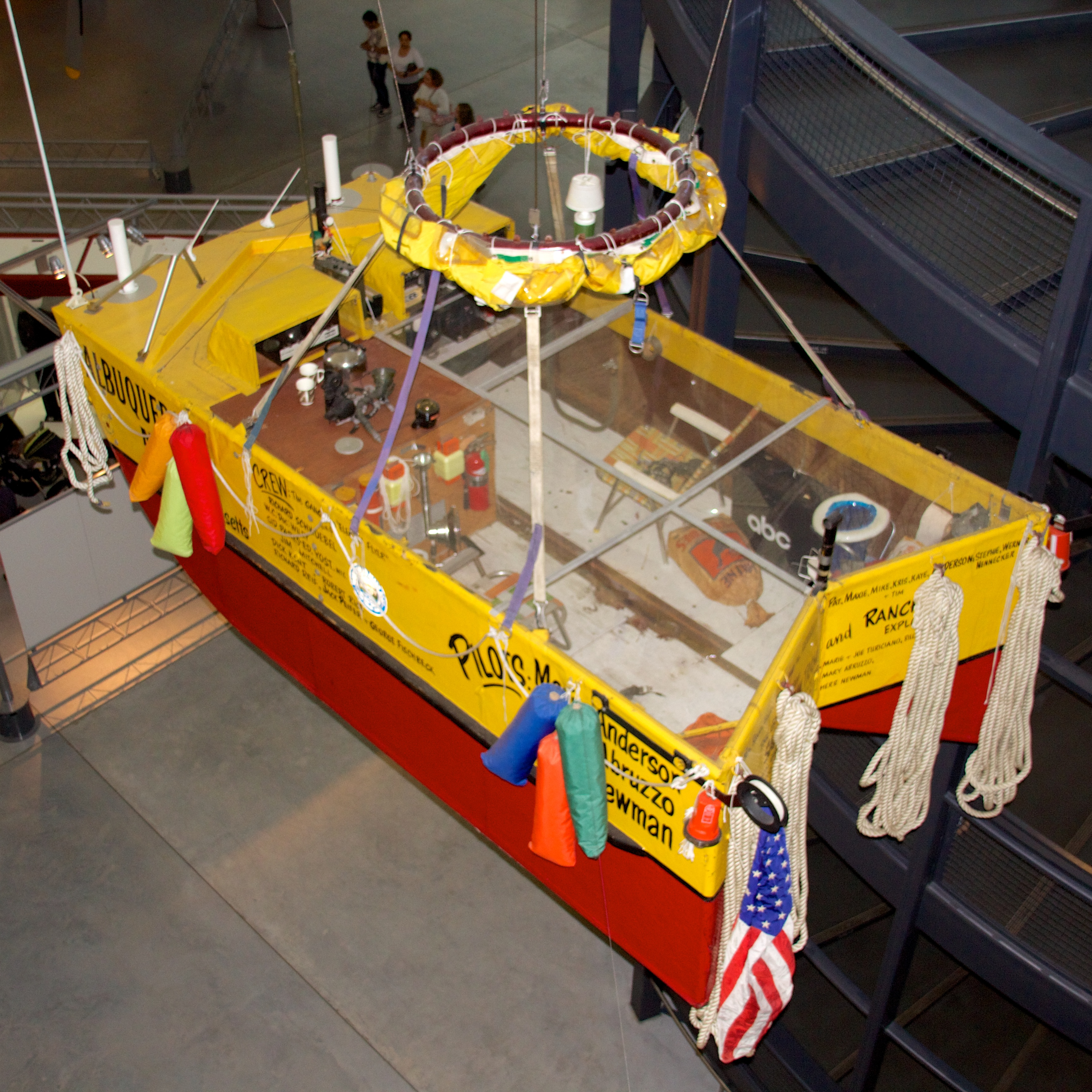
Double Eagle II Gondola

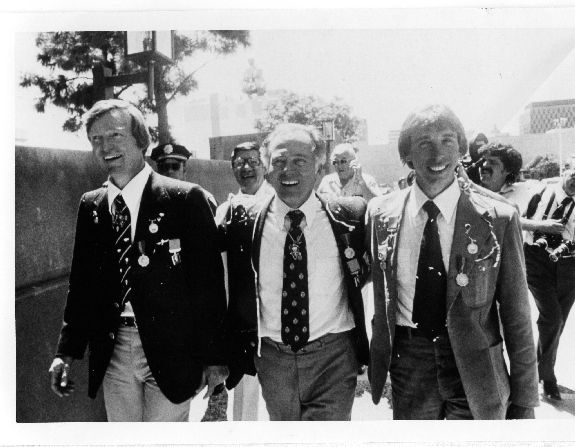
Ben Abruzzo, Maxie Anderson and Larry Newman of the Double Eagle II

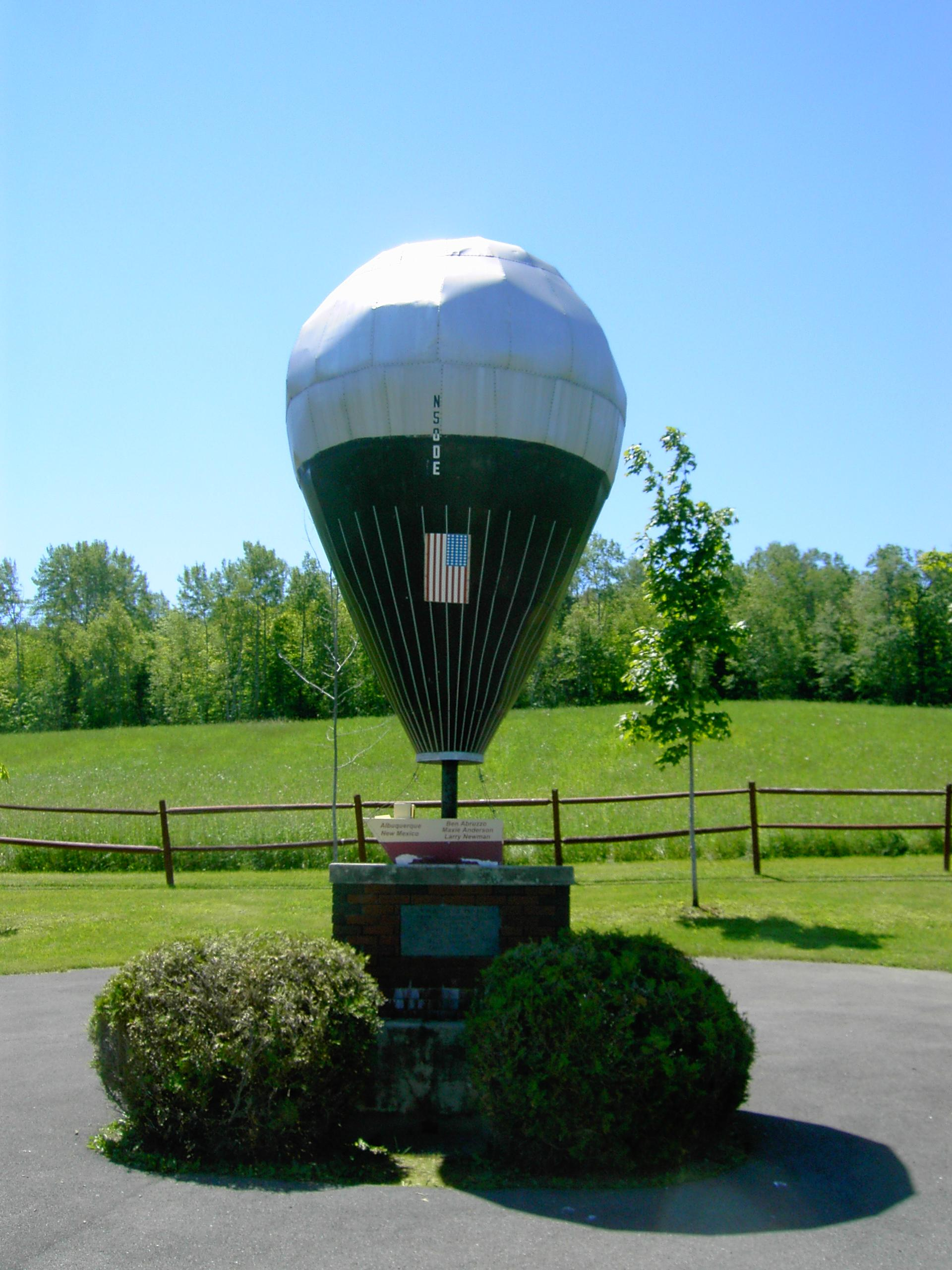
Double Eagle II Monument, Presque Isle, Maine

== Previous attempts ==
=== Double Eagle ===
Double Eagle was a helium balloon piloted by Ben Abruzzo and Maxie Anderson in a failed attempt to cross the Atlantic Ocean in 1977. It was the eleventh recorded attempt to make the crossing, which had been an open challenge in ballooning for more than a century. The balloon launched from Marshfield, Massachusetts, on September 9. After being blown off course by stormy weather, the team was forced to ditch three miles off the coast of Iceland on September 12, 65½ hours after taking off.

Double Eagle was designed by Ed Yost and had a 101,000 cubic foot (2,860 cubic meter) envelope. Abruzzo and Anderson rode in an insulated open gondola measuring 6 by 6.5 feet (1.8 by 2 meters) which was later reused for Double Eagle II.

=== Other attempts ===
All previous attempts at transatlantic balloon flights were launched from somewhere in North America, except for The Small World by Peter Elstob et al. in 1958, which took off from the Canary Islands.

The first recorded attempt in 1873 traveled only 45 miles (72 km).

The Rozière balloon The Free Life (attempt #4), carrying Malcolm Brighton, Rodney Anderson, and Pamela Brown, vanished September 1970 in the mid-Atlantic while attempting to fly from East Hampton, New York, to Europe.

The superpressure balloon Light Heart (attempt #6), carrying Colonel Thomas Leigh Gatch, Jr. USAR, disappeared February 1974 after being sighted over the Atlantic while attempting the cross from Harrisburg, Pennsylvania.

The Spirit of Man (attempt #7) in 1974 suffered a balloon burst over the New Jersey coast, killing the pilot, Robert C. Berger.

In 1976, Ed Yost in his Silver Fox (attempt #10), ditched east of the Azores as the wind carried him in the general direction of Western Sahara.

The Double Eagle (attempt #11), in 1977, ditched west of Iceland, having looped to the east of Greenland.

The Zanussi (attempt #13) in 1978, by Don Cameron and Christopher Davey, came closest to success, ditching 110 miles (180 km) off of France after the gas bag ripped. They had planned another attempt but called it off when the Double Eagle II succeeded.

Total death toll is five, including those on the two flights that vanished.

== Successful subsequent flights ==
In September 1986, Evelien Brink, her husband Henk and Willem Hageman completed the first transatlantic balloon flight by a European team and first with a woman aboard. The Dutch Viking (PH-EIS) completed the journey from St. John's, Newfoundland, to Almere, Netherlands, in 51 hours and 14 minutes. This bested the time set by the Double Eagle II significantly, though the Dutch Viking suffered a near-disastrous landing.
