= 1981 in aviation =

This is a list of aviation-related events from 1981.

== Events ==
=== January ===
- January 7 – A Boeing 747 of CAAC lands at John F. Kennedy International Airport in New York City, marking the first flight from the mainland of China to the United States since 1949.
- January 11–13 – Max Anderson and Don Ida make a failed attempt to circumnavigate the world by balloon, although their craft, the Jules Verne, makes a flight of 2,900 miles (4,700 km) from Luxor, Egypt, to New Delhi, India, in 48 hours before they give up.
- January 12 - 1981 Muñiz Air National Guard Base attack : the Boricua Popular Army (Ejército Popular Boricua), a Puerto Rican separatist organization, carried out multiple bombings at the Muñiz Air National Guard Base. The attack caused approximately $45,000,000 in damages to ten A-7D aircraft and a single F-104.
- January 25 – Bell Helicopter delivers its 25,000th production helicopter, a Bell 222 to Omniflight Helicopters.
- January 26 – Pan American World Airways makes its final Boeing 707 service.
- January 28 – Pan Am commences a weekly New York-Beijing service.

=== February ===
- February 1 – American aircraft industrialist Donald Douglas, founder of the Douglas Aircraft Company, dies at the age of 88.
- February 7 – Taking off with a center of gravity that is beyond certified limits thanks to improperly seated passengers and poorly secured cargo that shifts, a Soviet Navy Tupolev Tu-104A (NATO reporting name "Camel") rolls inverted and crashes immediately after takeoff from Pushkin Airport south of Leningrad in the Soviet Union's Russian Soviet Federated Socialist Republic, killing all 51 people on board. Some of the dead are high-ranking Soviet Navy officials returning to Vladivostok after visiting Leningrad for a naval exercise.
- February 12–14 – The American balloonists Maxie Anderson and Don Ida attempt a round-the-world balloon flight, setting off from Luxor, Egypt in the helium balloon Jules Verne on February 12, and landing 145 kilometres (78 nmi; 90 mi) east of New Delhi, India after a flight of 4,667 kilometres (2,520 nmi; 2,900 mi).
- February 18 – American aircraft designer and industrialist Jack Northrop, founder of the Northrop Corporation, dies at the age of 85.
- February 20 – Aerolíneas Argentinas Flight 342, operated by a Boeing 707-387B, nearly hit the transmitting antenna of the North Tower of the World Trade Center in New York City during its approach to John F. Kennedy International Airport.
- February 24 – On approach in rain and high winds to Val de Cans International Airport in Belém, Brazil, a VOTEC Serviços Aéreos Regionais Embraer EMB-110P Bandeirante strikes a ship in dry dock, then hits two barges before breaking in half, with its forward portion crashing onto a tug and its after portion sinking. The crash kills 11 of the 14 people on board.
- February 26 – A United States Air Force Lockheed MC-130EY Hercules making a low-level run crashes into the sea off Tabones Island in the Philippines, killing 23 of the 24 people on board.

=== March ===
- During the month, the North American Air Defense Command (NORAD) is renamed the North American Aerospace Defense Command.
- A court in Nicaragua declares LANICA bankrupt. The airline will cease flight operations in August.
- March 2 – Japan Air Lines becomes the first airline to use a computerised flight simulator to train its crews.
- March 10 – Shortly after taking off from Prince Said Ibrahim International Airport in Moroni, Comoros, on a maritime patrol mission, a French Navy Breguet 1150 Atlantic crashes into the Indian Ocean 15 kilometers (9.3 miles) from the airport, killing all 18 people on board.
- March 18 - Aviation advocate and founder of NYCAviation, Phil Derner, Jr., is born.
- March 26 – The keel of the first aircraft carrier designed as such to be built in Italy, Giuseppe Garibaldi, is laid by Italcantieri in Monfalcone.
- March 28
  - Members of the group Komando Jihad hijack the Douglas DC-9 Woyla, operating as Garuda Indonesia Flight 206 with 57 passengers on board, during a flight from Palembang to Medan on Sumatra in Indonesia, ordering the plane to fly to Colombo, Sri Lanka. After refueling at Penang, Malaysia, the aircraft flies to Don Muang, Thailand, where commandos of the Royal Thai Air Force and Indonesian Army Kopassus unit storm it. Four hijackers and a Kopassus commando are killed and two people are injured; the two hijackers who surrender are killed on an aircraft taking them and the Kopassus troops to Djakarta.
  - Air France pilot Michel Breton flies the airline's last Sud Aviation Caravelle service, from Amsterdam to Paris.
- March 29 – British Airways makes its last Vickers VC10 flight.

=== April ===
- April 3 – Pan American World Airways founder Juan Trippe dies in Los Angeles, California.
- April 4 – In the Iran–Iraq War, the Islamic Republic of Iran Air Force strikes deep into Iraqi territory, destroying 46 Iraqi aircraft at Al-Walid Air Base. Iraq later claims that the Syrian Air Force provided cover for the attack.
- April 10 – Japan Air Lines carries its 10 millionth passenger
- April 12 – The Space Shuttle Columbia takes off. It marks the first time an American space shuttle flies operationally. It glides to a landing two days later.
- April 17 – Air US Flight 716, a Handley Page HP.137 Jetstream (registration N11360), collides over Larimer County, Colorado, 3 kilometers (1.9 miles) east-southeast of Fort Collins–Loveland Municipal Airport with a Sky's West Parachute Center Cessna TU206 (registration N4862F) on a skydiving flight. The collision kills two skydivers on the Cessna; the other three skydivers on board and the pilot parachute to safety before the Cessna crashes. The Jetstream crashes almost nose-down in an open field about 4,000 feet (1,200 meters) of the Cessna's wreckage, killing all 11 people on board.
- April 28 – Despite forecasted icing conditions, an Aeroflot Antonov An-2TP (registration CCCP-92864), takes off from Batagay Airport in Batagay in the Soviet Union's Russian Soviet Federated Socialist Republic for a flight to Lazo. While flying over mountainous terrain at an altitude of 1,500 meters (4,900 feet), it encounters snow squalls, begins to descend, and crashes into a cloud-covered mountainside at an altitude of 860 meters (2,820 feet), killing all 12 people on board.
- April 30
  - The Israeli Air Force comes within hours of attacking the first Syrian 2K12 Kub (NATO reporting name "SA-6 Gainful") surface-to-air missile batteries deployed in Lebanon before the attack is cancelled.
  - People Express Airlines commences flight operations. On its first day, it offers Boeing 737 service from Newark International Airport in New Jersey to Buffalo, New York; Columbus, Ohio; and Norfolk, Virginia.

=== May ===
- May 1 – American Airlines launches AAdvantage, the world's second airline frequent-flyer program and the first since Texas International Airlines introduced the world's first one in 1979.
- May 2 – A 55-year-old Australian man, Laurence James Downey, enters a lavatory aboard Aer Lingus Flight 164, a Boeing 737-200 with 107 other people on board, five minutes before landing at London Heathrow Airport in London, England, douses himself with petrol (gasoline), and walks into the cockpit with a cigarette lighter in his hand. He demands that the airliner fly to Iran, then specifies France when the flight crew tells him that the aircraft lacks the fuel to fly to Iran. The plane lands at Le Touquet – Côte d'Opale Airport in Le Touquet, France, where Downey demands that Pope John Paul II make public the Third Secret of Fatima. After 10 hours, French police storm the plane and arrest Downey without injury to anyone.
- May 6
  - The world's first aircraft with a phased array radar – the Soviet Union′s Mikoyan MiG-31 (NATO reporting name "Foxhound") – enters service with the Soviet Air Defense Forces.
  - A United States Air Force Boeing EC-135N flying at an altitude of 29,000 feet (8,800 meters) pitches over into a dive, suffers an explosion at an altitude of 1,500 feet (460 meters), disintegrates, and crashes 3 kilometers (1.9 miles) north-northeast of Walkersville, Maryland, killing all 21 people on board.
- May 7 – On approach to Aeroparque Jorge Newbery in Buenos Aires, Argentina, Austral Líneas Aéreas Flight 901, a BAC One-Eleven 529FR (registration LV-LOX), enters a violent thunderstorm and crashes into the Río de la Plata 15 kilometers (9.3 miles) east-southeast of the airport, killing all 31 people on board.
- May 8 – United Airlines launches its Mileage Plus frequent-flyer program.
- May 9 – After modifications, the British aircraft carrier HMS Hermes reenters service with the Royal Navy as the world's first carrier with a ski-jump ramp. Royal Navy Lieutenant Commander D. R. Taylor had developed the ramp.
- May 20 – An Aero León Convair CV-440-11 (registration XA-HEK) crashes into Mexico's Pinarete Mountain at an altitude of 8,867 feet (2,703 meters), killing all 24 people on board.
- May 21 – Iraqi Air Force aircraft make a missile attack on the Panamanian bulk carrier Louise I in the Persian Gulf outside the Iranian port of Bandar-e Emam Khomeyni, slightly damaging her.
- May 22
  - American film director Boris Sagal is partially decapitated during the filming of the miniseries World War III when he turns the wrong way while disembarking from a Bell 206B helicopter in the parking lot of the Timberline Lodge on the south side of Mount Hood in Oregon and walks into the helicopter's tail rotor. He dies five hours later.
  - A TAME de Havilland Canada DHC-6 Twin Otter 300 (registration HC-BAX) crashes into the side of a mountain near Zumba, Ecuador, killing all 18 people on board.
- May 24 – An Ecuadorian Air Force Beechcraft Super King Air carrying President of Ecuador Jaime Roldós Aguilera, Ecuadorian Minister of Defense Marco Subía Martinez, their wives, and five other people crashes into the mountain Huairapungo near Macará, Ecuador, killing everyone on board. The crash is attributed to various causes, including pilot error, overloading of the aircraft with cargo, and an assassination of Roldós by the United States Government.
- May 26 – A United States Marine Corps Grumman EA-6B Prowler of Marine Tactical Electronic Warfare Squadron 2 (VMAQ-2) assigned to Carrier Air Wing 8 (CAW-8) crashes on the flight deck of the United States Navy aircraft carrier USS Nimitz (CVN-68) in the Atlantic Ocean off the coast of Florida. The resulting explosion and fire kills 14 men, injures another 45, destroys two F-14 Tomcats, and damages three F-14s, nine LTV A-7 Corsair IIs, three S-3A Vikings, a Grumman A-6 Intruder, and a Sikorsky SH-3 Sea King. Although none of the dead who tested positive for illegal drug use contributed to the crash, a U.S. Navy inquiry blames the accident on drug use by the enlisted men of the flight deck crew and prompts President Ronald Reagan to promulgate a "zero-tolerance policy" for drug abuse in the United States armed forces that creates the program in place ever since of mandatory, routine, random, universal testing of U.S. military personnel for the use of illegal drugs.
- May 29 – An Egyptian Air Force Lockheed C-130H Hercules crashes near Cairo, Egypt, killing all 17 people on board.

=== June ===
- June 5 – Dick Rutan sets a world straight-line distance record for FAI Class C-1-b (landplanes with a takeoff weight of 500–1,000 kg (1,100–2,200 lb) of 7,344.56 km (4,563.70 mi; 3,965.75 nmi), flying from Anchorage, Alaska to Grand Turk Island in a modified Rutan Long-EZ.
- June 7 – In Operation Opera, eight Israeli Air Force F-16 Fighting Falcons armed with two 2,000-pound (910 kg) bombs each, escorted by six F-15 Eagles, make a long-range strike into Iraq to destroy the nuclear reactor at Osirak. A French technician and a number of Iraqis are killed. It is the first time any air force uses the F-16 in combat.
- June 13 – Several Islamic Republic of Iran Air Force F-4 Phantom II fighter-bombers overfly Kuwait, apparently to warn Kuwait to reduce its support for Iraq in the Iran–Iraq War, and Kuwaiti air defenses fire at them.
- June 14 – Diverting from Nizhneangarsk after Nizhneangarsk Airport closes due to bad weather, Aeroflot Flight 498, an Ilysuhin Il-14M (registration CCCP-41838) diverts to Ust-Barguzin in the Soviet Union's Russian Soviet Federated Socialist Republic. On descent to Ust-Barguzin, it crashes into a mountain on the Svyatoi Nos Peninsula on the east coast of the Lake Baikal at an altitude of 1,300 meters (4,300 feet) about 30 kilometers (19 miles) east of Ust-Barguzin's airfield, killing all 48 people on board.
- June 26 – Dan-Air Flight 240, a Hawker Siddeley HS 748 series 2A cargo aircraft, crashes near Nailstone, Leicestershire, England, killing the entire crew of three, after the failure of a cabin door causes a major structural failure.

=== July ===
- A gradual process for the privatization of the Peruvian government-owned airline Aeroperú begins, with the Peruvian government retaining only a 20 percent stake in the company.
- July 7 – Stephen Ptacek flies the solar-powered aircraft Solar Challenger across the English Channel, taking off from Cergy-Pontoise and landing at Manston Airport, the flight taking five hours 23 minutes.
- July 17 – The Israeli Air Force attacks Beirut, Lebanon, in retribution for Palestinian terror attacks.
- July 18 – After a Transporte Aéreo Rioplatense Canadair CL-44 delivering arms from Israel to Iran for Iran to use in the Iran–Iraq War strays into Soviet airspace, a Soviet Air Defense Forces Sukhoi Su-15 (NATO reporting name "Flagon") intercepts and collides with it. Both aircraft crash near Yerevan in the Soviet Union′s Armenian Soviet Socialist Republic. The Soviet pilot ejects safely, but all four people aboard the CL-44 are killed.
- July 20 – Somali Airlines Flight 40, a Fokker F27 Friendship 600RF (registration 6O-SAY), encounters heavy rain and severe turbulence eight minutes after takeoff from Mogadishu International Airport in Mogadishu, Somalia. It goes into a spiral dive, loses part of its right wing, and crashes near Balad, Somalia, killing all 50 people on board. It is the deadliest aviation accident in the history of Somalia.
- July 24 – Air Madagascar Flight 112, a de Havilland Canada DHC-6 Twin Otter 300 (registration 5R-MGB), crashes northeast of Maroantsetra Airport in Maroantsetra, Madagascar, killing all 19 people on board.
- July 27 – Aeroméxico Flight 230, a Douglas DC-9-32 (registration XA-DEN), crashes on landing at General Roberto Fierro Villalobos International Airport in Chihuahua, Mexico, and bursts into flames, killing 30 of the 66 people on board.
- July 28 – The impeached former President of Iran, Abulhassan Banisadr, flees Iran after being smuggled aboard an Islamic Republic of Iran Air Force Boeing 707. The aircraft takes him to exile in Paris, France.
- July 31 – The leader of Panama's military dictatorship, General Omar Torrijos Herrera, dies along with all six other people on board when a Panamanian Air Force de Havilland Canada DHC-6 Twin Otter crashes into Marta Hill while trying to land at Coclesito, Panama, in bad weather.

=== August ===
- During the month, Iran's religious leaders discover the Islamic Republic of Iran Air Force's complicity in the escape of former President of Iran Abulhassan Banisadr from the country. They purge half of Iran's American-trained air force officers, causing the air force's operational strength to drop well below 100 aircraft, end virtually all air force training flights, and require religious approval of all Iranian air force operations and the allocation of only enough fuel to allow specific missions to be flown. Through the end of the Iran–Iraq War in 1988, the Iranian air force will not recover from this purge.
- August 1 – An Aeroflot Ilyushin Il-14M (registration CCCP-91517) flying in poor visibility crashes into terrain on Utichy Island in the Shantar Islands in Uda Bay off the Sea of Okhotsk coast of the Soviet Union, killing all 11 people on board.
- August 3
  - In violation of American law, the Professional Air Traffic Controllers Organization declares a strike by the 17,000 air traffic controllers in the United States. At least 12,000 of them walk off their jobs, resulting in widespread flight delays and cancellations, and 22 of the busiest airports in the United States are directed to reduce their scheduled flights by 50 percent.
  - Boeing deliver its 4,000th jet airliner, a Boeing 727-200 to Ansett Australia.
- August 5 – After only 1,300 air traffic controllers comply with his order to return to work, President Ronald Reagan fires the 11,345 controllers who had ignored the order and bans them from service in the U.S. federal government for life.
- August 13 – All 13 people on board die when a Bristow Helicopters Westland Wessex 60 helicopter carrying workers from the offshore Leman Gas Field to Bacton Gas Terminal at Bacton, Norfolk, England, loses power and crashes into the North Sea.
- August 19
  - Indian Airlines Flight 557, a HAL 748, is damaged beyond repair when it overruns the runway at Mangalore Airport at Mangalore, India, but all 26 people on board – among them Karnataka state and future Indian government official Veerappa Moily – are uninjured.
  - Two United States Navy F-14 Tomcats of Fighter Squadron 41 (VF-41) aboard the aircraft carrier USS Nimitz (CVN-68) shoot down two Sukhoi Su-22s (NATO reporting name "Fitter") of the Libyan Air Force over the Gulf of Sidra 60 nautical miles (110 kilometres) off the coast of Libya using AIM-9 Sidewinder air-to-air missiles. They are the first and second of the five kills F-14s will score during the Tomcat's career in U.S. Navy service.
- August 22 – Far Eastern Air Transport Flight 103, a Boeing 737-222, suffers explosive decompression shortly after departure from Taipei Songshan Airport in Taipei, Taiwan, after severe corrosion leads to a pressure hull rupture. The plane breaks up in mid-air and crashes, killing all 110 people on board.
- August 24 – Aeroflot Flight 811, an Antonov An-24RV (registration CCCP-91517), collides in midair with a Soviet Air Forces Tupolev Tu-16K (NATO reporting name "Badger") over the Soviet Union at an altitude of 17,000 feet (5,200 meters) 70 kilometers (43 miles) east of Zavitinsk. Both planes crash, killing 31 of the 32 people aboard the An-24RV and six people aboard the Tu-16. The sole survivor from the An-24RV, 20-year-old passenger Larisa Savitskaya, is rescued from a forest on August 27.
- August 26 – Flying in poor visibility, Aeropesca Colombia Flight 221, a Vickers 754D Viscount (registration HK-1320), crashes into the jungle on Mount Santa Elena, about 48 kilometers (30 miles) north of Florencia, Colombia, killing all 50 people on board.
- August 31 – The bankrupt Nicaraguan airline LANICA ceases flight operations.

=== September ===
- September 2 – An overloaded Taxi Aéreo El Venado Embraer EMB-110P1 Bandeirante (registration HK-2651) fails to gain altitude after takeoff from Juan Jose Rondon Airport in Paipa, Colombia. Maneuvering to avoid trees and buildings, it stalls, crashes 3 kilometers (1.9 miles) from the airport, and catches fire. The crash and fire kill 17 of the 22 people on board immediately, and four of those pulled alive from the wreckage die of their injuries within a day of the accident.
- September 3 – McDonnell Douglas delivers the 1,000th DC-9 produced, a DC-9 Super 80; it was ordered by Swissair.
- September 10 – British Airways CEO Roy Watts announces a financial crisis for the airline. He states that the company is losing £UK 200 per minute.
- September 11 – a twin-engine airplane crashes into the Swing Auditorium in San Bernardino, CA. Two people aboard the plane are killed. As a result of the crash, the auditorium is irreparably damaged.
- September 18 – An Aeroflot Yakovlev Yak-40 (registration CCCP-87455) on approach to Irkutsk Airport in Irkutsk collides over the Soviet Union with an Aeroflot Mil Mi-8 helicopter (registration CCCP-22268) on a training flight at an altitude of 400 meters (1,300 feet) 11 kilometers (6.8 miles) from Zheleznogorsk-Ilimskiy. Both aircraft crash, killing all 33 people on the Yak-40 and seven people on the helicopter.
- September 22 – An Ilyushin Il-86, flown by G. Volokhov, sets a series of world speed records for flight over a 2,000 km (1,200 mi; 1,100 nmi) closed circuit for aircraft with payloads of 30,000–65,000 kg (66,000–143,000 lb), with a speed of 975.3 km/h (606.0 mph; 526.6 kn).
- September 24 – G. Volokhov sets another set of closed circuit speed records in an Ilyushin Il-86, over a 1,000 km (620 mi; 540 nmi) circuit with payloads of 30,000–80,000 kg (66,000–176,000 lb), at a speed of 962 km/h (598 mph; 519 kn).
- September 29 – An Islamic Republic of Iran Air Force Lockheed C-130H Hercules crashes at Kahrizak, Iran, during a flight from the Iran–Iraq War's front line to Tehran, killing 80 people. Iran's minister of defense, his chief of staff, the Islamic Republic of Iran Army chief of staff, and the regional commander of the Islamic Revolutionary Guard Corps are among the dead.

=== October ===
- October 1 – Three Islamic Republic of Iran Air Force F-4 Phantom II fighter-bombers bomb the Kuwaiti oil facility at Umm al-Aish, prompting Kuwait to recall its ambassador to Iran.
- October 2 – President of the United States Ronald Reagan restarts the Rockwell B-1 Lancer bomber program by announcing the order of 100 B-1Bs for the United States Air Force.
- October 5 – American singer, songwriter, and comedian Jud Strunk is killed at the controls of his Fairchild M-62A when it crashes on takeoff at Carrabassett Valley Airport in Carabassett Valley, Maine. His passenger also is killed.
- October 9 – The helium-filled balloon Super Chicken III, piloted by John Shoecroft and Fred Gorrell, takes off from near Los Angeles. It lands in Georgia 22 hours and 25 minutes later, having carried out the first non-stop trans-America flight in a balloon.
- October 6 – NLM CityHopper Flight 431 encounters a tornado, loses a wing, breaks up in mid-air, and crashes near Moerdijk, Netherlands. All 17 people aboard the Fokker F28 Fellowship 4000 die.
- October 19 – Iraqi Air Force aircraft attack merchant ships in the Persian Gulf near the Iranian port of Bandar-e Emam Khomeyni, damaging the Liberian bulk carrier Al Tajdar with a missile hit and seriously damaging the Panamanian bulk carrier Moira with a bomb. Both ships later are repaired.
- October 22 – The United States Government decertifies the Professional Air Traffic Controllers Organization because of its illegal August 1981 strike.
- October 25 – Iraqi Air Force aircraft make a missile attack on the Indian bulk carrier Rashi Vish Wamitra in the Persian Gulf near the Iranian port of Bandar-e Emam Khomeyni, starting a fire which causes heavy damage to the ship.

=== November ===
- November 13 – Ben Abruzzo and his crew make the first crossing of the Pacific Ocean by balloon, in the Double Eagle V.
- November 14 – The Space Shuttle Columbia lands at Edwards Air Force Base in California, completing STS-2, the second Space Shuttle flight. To test the shuttle's stability and controls, astronaut Joe H. Engle flies the entire approach and landing manually, the only shuttle pilot ever to do so. It is also the only time that any aerospace vehicle has been flown manually from Mach 25 through touchdown.
- November 21 – The United States bans the Soviet airline Aeroflot from flying in its airspace after an Aeroflot flight strays from its supposed flight path and overflies American military installations.
- November 26 – The French balloonists Hélène Dorigny and Michel Arnoud land their Cameron A-530 balloon Semiramis at St Christophe-en-Boucherie in France, having taken off from Ballina, County Mayo, Ireland, the previous day. They set a new hot air balloon distance record of 1,154.74 km (717.52 mi; 623.51 nmi).

=== December ===
- December 1 – A chartered Yugoslavian McDonnell Douglas MD-82 operating as Inex-Adria Aviopromet Flight 1308 crashes into Mount San Pietro on Corsica, killing all 180 people on board.
- December 5 – December 8 – Jerry Mullins sets a closed-circuit distance record for piston engined aircraft, piloting the Javelin Phoenix, a modified Bede BD-2, a distance of 8,695.9 nautical miles (10,007.1 mi; 16,104.8 km) in a circuit between Oklahoma City and Jacksonville.
- December 12 – Maxie Anderson and Don Ida launch from Luxor, Egypt, in the balloon Jules Verne to begin the first serious attempt at a circumnavigation of the world by balloon. They are forced to end their attempt on December 14 at Hansa, India, after a flight of 2,676 miles (4,307 km).
- December 25 – U.S. Air Force Lieutenant Thomas Tiller is rescued from the Atlantic Ocean by a boat. He had floated at sea for seven days after his plane, an F-4 Phantom II, had crashed on December 18.

== First flights ==
=== January ===
- January 1 – LearAvia Lear Fan N626BL

=== February ===
- February 21 - Schempp-Hirth Nimbus-3
- February 26 – Aerotec Tangará
- February 28 – Valentin Taifun D-KONO

=== March ===
- March 6 - Fournier RF-10
- March 28 – Dornier 228 D-IFNS

=== April ===
- April 10 – SIAI Marchetti S.211 I-SITF
- April 15 – Dassault-Breguet Guardian

=== May ===
- May 22 – Gulfstream Peregrine 600

=== June ===
- June 1 – Shorts 360
- June 2 – Grinvalds Orion
- June 18 – F-117 Nighthawk

=== July ===
- July 4 – Schleicher ASW 22

=== August ===
- August 19 – Beriev A-60

=== September ===
- September 3 – BAe 146 G-SSSH
- September 26 – Boeing 767 N767BA

=== November ===
- November 5 – AV-8B Harrier II 161396

=== December ===
- December 11 – OMAC I
- December 17 – Hughes NOTAR
- December 17 – NAC Fieldmaster
- December 30– Akaflieg Stuttgart FS-31

== Entered service ==
- Bell EH-1H with United States Army
- Vympel R-33 anti-aircraft missile

=== January ===
- January 18 – Bell 412

=== April ===
- Beechcraft Super King Air Model B200

=== December ===
- December 7 – Mitsubishi F-15J with Japan Air Self-Defense Force

== Retirements ==
- Second half of 1981 – Avro Canada CF-100 Canuck by the Canadian Armed Forces

== Deadliest crash ==
The deadliest crash of this year was Inex-Adria Aviopromet Flight 1308, a McDonnell Douglas MD-81 which crashed into mountainous terrain on the island of Corsica, France on 1 December, killing all 180 people on board.
