= Flight 40 =

Flight 40 may refer to:

- Mohawk Airlines Flight 40, crashed on 23 June 1967
- Somali Airlines Flight 40, crashed on 20 July 1981
