= Budget of NASA =

Budget allocated to American space agency NASA by the US Congress

As a federal agency, the National Aeronautics and Space Administration (NASA) receives its funding from the annual federal budget passed by the United States Congress. The following charts detail the amount of federal funding allotted to NASA each year over its history to pursue programs in aeronautics research, robotic spaceflight, technology development, and human space exploration programs.

== Annual budget ==
NASA's budget for fiscal year (FY) 2026 is $24.4 billion. It represents 0.35% of the $7.0 trillion the United States spent in the previous year.

The appropriated FY2026 budget has the largest discrepancy from the White House Request since 1987 at nearly 30%. The request, submitted in May 2025, proposed a 24% cut to NASA's overall budget. In January 2026, Congress passed the final budget, rejecting nearly all of the proposed cuts.

For the future FY2027 budget, the White House Request, released in April 2026, proposed a 23% cut to the overall budget. Notably, this request consists of a 47% cut to the Science Mission Directorate and a nearly 10% increase in funding for Exploration Systems, which includes the Artemis program.

Since its inception, the United States has spent over $1.9 trillion (in 2025 dollars) on NASA.

Fiscal Year	Nominal Dollars (Millions)	2025 Dollars (Millions)	% of U.S. Spending	% of U.S. Discretionary Spending
1959	331	5,507	0.16%	
1960	523	8,342	0.43%	
1961	964	14,899	0.76%	
1962	1,825	27,125	1.18%	1.70%
1963	3,674	52,753	2.29%	3.40%
1964	5,100	70,074	3.52%	5.30%
1965	5,250	69,762	4.31%	6.50%
1966	5,175	64,874	4.41%	6.60%
1967	4,968	59,373	3.45%	5.10%
1968	4,589	52,029	2.65%	4.00%
1969	3,995	42,857	2.31%	3.60%
1970	3,749	37,623	1.92%	3.10%
1971	3,313	31,271	1.61%	2.80%
1972	3,310	29,563	1.48%	2.70%
1973	3,408	28,791	1.35%	2.50%
1974	3,040	23,959	1.21%	2.40%
1975	3,231	22,983	0.98%	2.10%
1976	3,552	23,179	0.99%	2.10%
1977	3,819	22,498	0.98%	2.00%
1978	4,064	22,208	0.91%	1.90%
1979	4,559	22,753	0.87%	1.80%
1980	5,243	23,637	0.84%	1.80%
1981	5,486	22,464	0.82%	1.80%
1982	6,020	22,864	0.83%	1.90%
1983	6,838	24,411	0.85%	1.90%
1984	7,198	24,378	0.83%	1.90%
1985	7,552	24,741	0.77%	1.70%
1986	7,656	24,346	0.75%	1.70%
1987	10,434	31,876	0.76%	1.70%
1988	8,956	25,983	0.85%	2.00%
1989	10,791	29,869	0.96%	2.30%
1990	12,297	32,574	0.99%	2.50%
1991	14,016	35,839	1.05%	2.60%
1992	14,317	34,805	1.01%	2.60%
1993	14,310	33,385	1.01%	2.70%
1994	14,570	32,972	0.94%	2.50%
1995	13,854	30,548	0.88%	2.50%
1996	13,886	29,869	0.89%	2.60%
1997	13,711	29,095	0.90%	2.60%
1998	13,637	28,229	0.86%	2.60%
1999	13,627	27,540	0.80%	2.40%
2000	13,588	26,388	0.75%	2.20%
2001	14,254	26,712	0.76%	2.20%
2002	14,868	27,104	0.72%	2.00%
2003	15,449	27,561	0.68%	1.80%
2004	15,342	26,465	0.66%	1.70%
2005	16,187	27,097	0.63%	1.60%
2006	16,570	26,877	0.57%	1.50%
2007	16,285	25,437	0.58%	1.50%
2008	17,309	26,103	0.60%	1.60%
2009	18,784	27,801	0.54%	1.50%
2010	18,719	27,330	0.55%	1.40%
2011	18,432	26,487	0.49%	1.30%
2012	17,773	25,273	0.49%	1.30%
2013	16,865	23,628	0.49%	1.40%
2014	17,646	24,246	0.49%	1.50%
2015	18,010	24,259	0.50%	1.60%
2016	19,285	25,668	0.49%	1.60%
2017	19,653	25,608	0.47%	1.60%
2018	20,736	26,355	0.48%	1.60%
2019	21,500	26,811	0.48%	1.60%
2020	22,629	27,607	0.35%	1.40%
2021	23,271	27,367	0.33%	1.40%
2022	24,041	26,782	0.38%	1.40%
2023	25,384	27,211	0.41%	1.50%
2024	24,875	25,820	0.36%	1.40%
2025	24,875	24,875	0.35%	1.30%
2026	24,438	24,438	0.33%	1.30%

Notes

- The budget dollar values refer to the specific appropriations provided by congress to NASA. It may differ slightly from the total outlay (real expenditure) of funds allocated to NASA.
- Data for this table collected by The Planetary Society.

== Cost of Apollo program ==
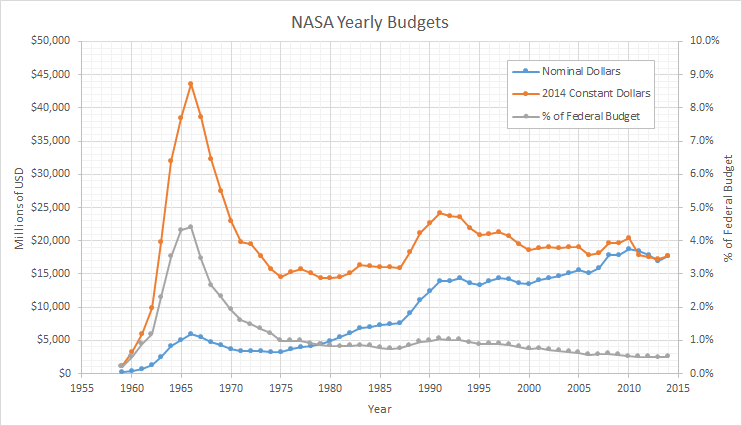
NASA's spending peaked in 1966 during the Apollo program.

NASA's budget peaked in 1964–66 when it consumed roughly 4% of all federal spending. The agency was building up to the first Moon landing and the Apollo program was a top national priority, consuming more than half of NASA's budget and driving NASA's workforce to more than 34,000 employees and 375,000 contractors from industry and academia.

In 1973, NASA submitted congressional testimony reporting the total cost of Project Apollo as $25.4 billion (about $192 billion in 2025 dollars).

== Economic impact of NASA funding ==
A November 1971 study of NASA released by MRIGlobal (formerly Midwest Research Institute) of Kansas City, Missouri concluded that "the $25 billion in 1958 dollars spent on civilian space R & D during the 1958–1969 period has returned $52 billion through 1971 – and will continue to produce payoffs through 1987, at which time the total pay-off will have been $181 billion. The discounted rate of return for this investment will have been 33 percent."

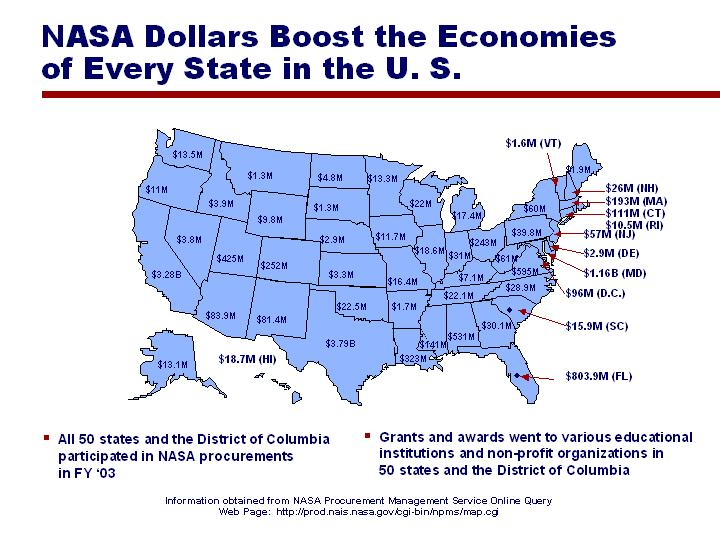
A map from NASA's web site illustrating its economic impact on the U.S. states (as of FY2003)

Other statistics on NASA's economic impact may be found in the 1976 Chase Econometrics Associates, Inc. reports and backed by the 1989 Chapman Research report, which examined 259 non-space applications of NASA technology during an eight-year period (1976–1984) and found more than:

- $21.6 billion in sales and benefits
- 352,000 (mostly skilled) jobs created or saved
- $355 million in federal corporate income taxes

According to a 1992 Nature commentary, these 259 applications represent ". . .only 1% of an estimated 25,000 to 30,000 Space program spin-offs."

A 2013 report prepared by the Tauri Group for NASA showed that NASA invested nearly $5 billion in U.S. manufacturing in FY 2012, with nearly $2 billion of that going to the technology sector. NASA also develops and commercializes technology, some of which can generate over $1 billion in revenue per year over multiple years

In 2014, the American Helicopter Society criticized NASA and the government for reducing the annual rotorcraft budget from $50 million in 2000 to $23 million in 2013, impacting commercial opportunities.

The 2017 Economic Impact Report prepared by NASA for their Small Business Innovation Research (SBIR) and Small Business Technology Transfer (STTR) awards found that for FY 2016, these programs created 2,412 jobs, $474 million in economic output, and $57.3 million in fiscal impact with an initial investment of $172.9 million.

== Public perception ==
The perceived national security threat posed by early Soviet leads in spaceflight drove NASA's budget to its peak, both in real inflation-adjusted dollars and in a percentage of the total federal budget (4.41% in 1966). But the apparent U.S. victory in the Space Race — landing men on the Moon — erased the perceived threat, and NASA was unable to sustain political support for its vision of an even more ambitious Space Transportation System entailing reusable Earth-to-orbit shuttles, a permanent space station, lunar bases, and a human mission to Mars. Only a scaled-back space shuttle was approved, and NASA's funding leveled off at just under 1% in 1976, then declined to 0.75% in 1986. After a brief increase to 1.01% in 1992, it declined to about 0.5% in 2013.

Also with the arrival of the 1970s concern had shifted away from the space program and national security toward issues like environmentalism and NASA did not deal with matters pertaining to the environment. For example, the US Weather Service started dealing with weather satellites in 1965 and by the 1970s there was no NASA involvement. There was also no centralized general space group in the 1960s and 70s unlike the environmental movement which had the Audubon Society and the Sierra Club as argued in one academic article. The space organizations that did exist had different interests along with types of people in them as well.

To help with public perception and to raise awareness regarding the widespread benefits of NASA-funded programs and technologies, NASA instituted the Spinoffs publication. This was a direct offshoot of the Technology Utilization Program Report, a "publication dedicated to informing the scientific community about available NASA technologies, and ongoing requests received for supporting information." according to the NASA Spinoff about page the technologies in these reports created interest in the technology transfer concept, its successes, and its use as a public awareness tool. The reports generated such keen interest by the public that NASA decided to make them into an attractive publication. Thus, the first four-color edition of Spinoff was published in 1976.

The American public, on average, believes NASA's budget has a much larger share of the federal budget than it actually does. A 1997 poll reported that Americans had an average estimate of 20% for NASA's share of the federal budget, far higher than the actual 0.5% to under 1% that has been maintained throughout the late '90s and first decade of the 2000s. It is estimated that most Americans spent less than $9 on NASA through personal income tax in 2009.

However, there has been a recent movement to communicate discrepancy between perception and reality of NASA's budget as well as lobbying to return the funding back to the 1970–1990 level. The United States Senate Science Committee met in March 2012 where astrophysicist Neil deGrasse Tyson testified that "Right now, NASA's annual budget is half a penny on your tax dollar. For twice that—a penny on a dollar—we can transform the country from a sullen, dispirited nation, weary of economic struggle, to one where it has reclaimed its 20th-century birthright to dream of tomorrow." Inspired by Tyson's advocacy and remarks, the Penny4NASA campaign was initiated in 2012 by John Zeller and advocates the doubling of NASA's budget to one percent of the Federal Budget, or one "penny on the dollar."

In 2018, Business Insider surveyed approximately 1,000 US residents to determine what they believed was the annual NASA budget. The average respondent estimated that NASA's budget was 6.4% of annual federal spending, when it was actually 0.5%. In a follow-up question, 85% of respondents stated that NASA funding should be increased, despite the majority of responses overestimating NASA's actual budget.

NASA's cost overruns and time delays have been blamed by some on NASA's usage of cost-plus contracts and avoidance of fixed-price contracts.

=== Political opposition to NASA funding ===
Public opposition to NASA and its budget dates back to the Apollo era. Critics have cited more immediate concerns, like social welfare programs, as reasons to cut funding to the agency. Furthermore, they have questioned the return on investment (ROI) feasibility of NASA's research and development. In 1968, physicist Ralph Lapp argued that if NASA really did have a positive ROI, it should be able to sustain itself as a private company, and not require federal funding. More recently, critics have faulted NASA for sinking money into the Space Shuttle program, reducing funding available for its long-term missions to Mars and deep space. Human missions to Mars have also been denounced for their inefficiency and large cost compared to uncrewed missions. In the 2010s, Republicans in Congress increasingly opposed the Earth science aspects of NASA spending, arguing that spending on Earth science programs such as climate research was in pursuit of political agendas.

== See also ==
- Federal budget (United States)
- Space policy of the United States
