= Penny4NASA =

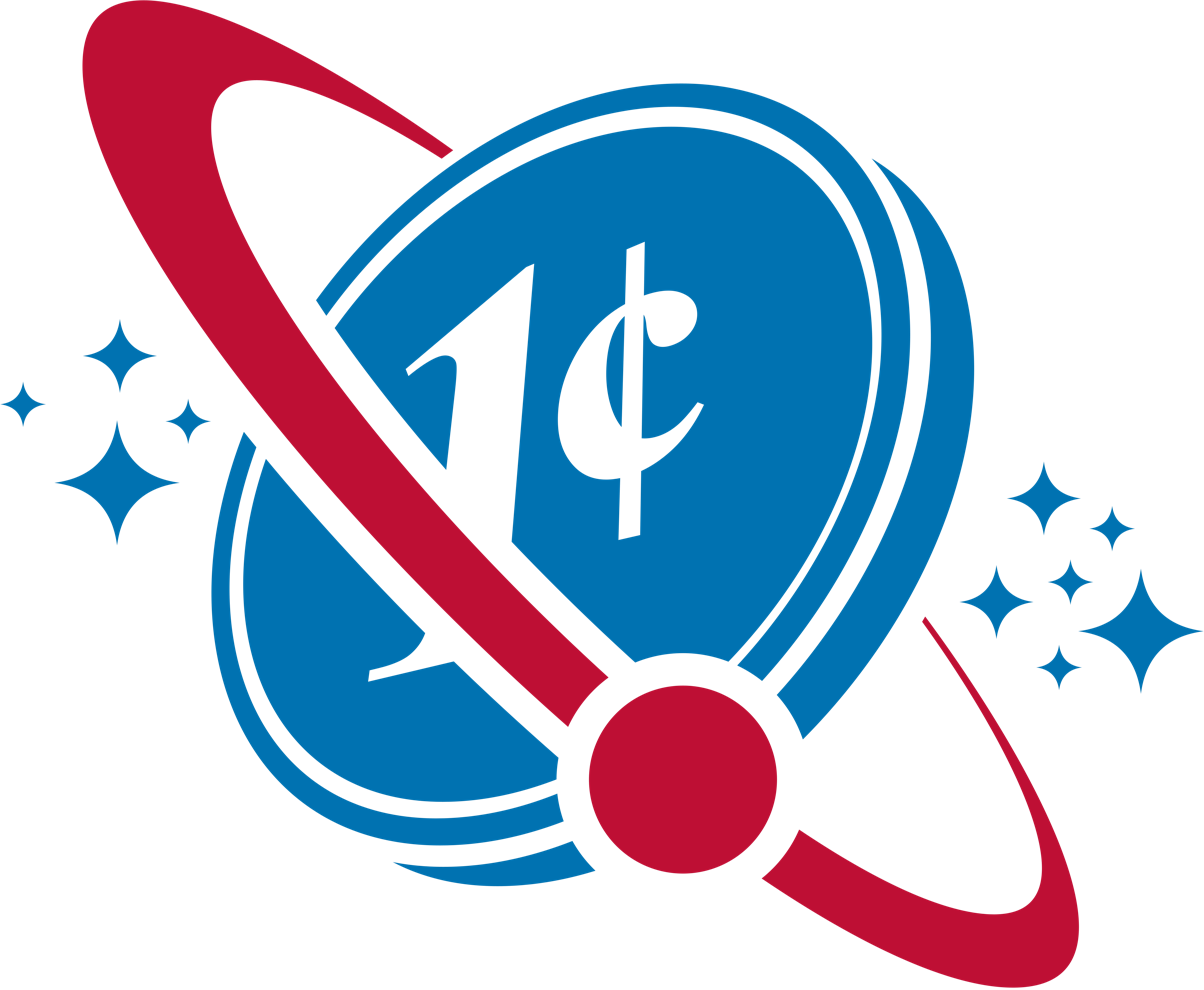
- Formation: 2012; 14 years ago
- Founders: John Zeller, Evan Schurr
- Purpose: Space advocacy
- Executive Director: John Zeller
- Social Media: Curtiss Thompson
- Video Development: Evan Schurr
- Web Development: Joseph Spens
- Board of directors: John Zeller, Trevor Waddell, Kyle Sullivan, Nick Saab, Evan Schurr
- Parent organization: Space Advocates

Penny4NASA was a campaign run by the Space Advocates nonprofit, a nonpartisan organization seeking to promote the expansion of funding for the economic, scientific and cultural value of the United States' national space program by advocating an increase in the budget for the National Aeronautics and Space Administration to at least one percent of the United States Federal Budget. Penny4NASA attempted to promote public awareness of the NASA mission and budget by producing a series of outreach videos, as well as performing educational outreach via social media.

== Overview ==
Penny4NASA was a campaign of Space Advocates, an initiative founded by John Zeller in 2012, proposing an increase in the budget for the National Aeronautics and Space Administration to promote the scientific and technological goals of the space agency. The organization worked to accomplish these aims through public outreach, educational materials, and organized petitions to the Executive and Legislative branches of the United States government toward those aims. Penny4NASA used to be the campaign Space Advocates was best known for.

The Penny4NASA campaign was founded in 2012 following the testimony of astrophysicist Neil DeGrasse Tyson – curator of the Hayden Planetarium in New York – before the United States Senate Science Committee. According to Tyson's testimony, "Right now, NASA's annual budget is half a penny on your tax dollar. For twice that—a penny on a dollar—we can transform the country from a sullen, dispirited nation, weary of economic struggle, to one where it has reclaimed its 20th century birthright to dream of tomorrow."

=== Objectives ===
The Penny4NASA mission statement declared that a main goal of their campaign is to call upon the White House and U.S. Congress "to increase NASA's funding from its current level of 0.48% to a whole one percent of the US annual budget." The organization hoped to meet this aim by encouraging to public to "consistently and in large numbers, [contact] members of congress to tell them what [the public] want[s]."

Another goal of the Penny4NASA campaign, as part of its larger goal to influence the public in favor of increasing the funding allotted the U.S. space program, was to communicate accurate information about how much funding has been allotted NASA over its operational history. The mission statement stated that "2012 is the 2nd lowest year of NASA funding by percentage of the US budget since 1958 and 1959, their founding years."

Neil deGrasse Tyson, a stated influence of the Penny4NASA organization, has argued that NASA is not only underfunded, but that the general public overestimates how much revenue is allocated to the space program. At a March 2010 talk delivered in the University at Buffalo's Distinguished Speaker series, Tyson stated:

"By the way, how much does NASA cost? It's a half a penny on the dollar. Did you know that? The people are saying, 'Why are we spending money [...].' I ask them, 'How much do you think we're spending?' They say 'five cents, ten cents on a dollar.' It's a half a penny."

Tyson has proposed increasing the budget of NASA and suggested that doing so would increase the capabilities of human spaceflight, allowing the space program to "do it all", referring to pursuing multiple avenues of exploration.

=== Media coverage and reception ===
In March 2012, Neil deGrasse Tyson was interviewed by Joshua Topolsky. Speaking of the Penny4NASA campaign and social media initiatives, Tyson said he was surprised by the online mobilization within 10 days of his Senate committee testimony, and that he was "happy to learn that" people were moved by it.

On June 10, 2012, John Zeller, then an undergraduate student at Oregon State University majoring in Computer Science, was interviewed in the Science for the People podcast. Zeller started the Penny4NASA.org web site after observing Neil deGrasse Tyson giving a testimony before the U.S. Senate committee on Commerce, Science, and Transportation. Zeller states, "After watching this video, I went on Twitter and Facebook and I saw hashtag Penny4NASA all over the place. There had been a video put on YouTube that had hashtag Penny4NASA all over it that was trending around 300,000 views." The success of the video prompted Zeller to begin the web site and set up a petition and social media around the 'Penny4NASA' hashtag that had come to summarize the proposal of its movement.

A September 2, 2012 episode of Astronomy Cast recorded at DragonCon in Atlanta, Georgia focused on funding issues related to space exploration. Discussing the Penny4NASA proposal and supportive of its goals, astronomer Pamela Gay stated that it may not be a realistic goal to "convince the Congress to take a penny of every tax dollar and give it to NASA," but went on to say it may be possible to produce "the same ultimate effect by individuals who have the extra ten dollars and care about science and finding that science project that they believe in and giving it ten dollars".

== Campaign efforts ==
In 2012, Penny4NASA organization released a two-part video series titled "We Stopped Dreaming" to make a case for expanding the combined efforts of the National Aeronautics and Space Administration, international space partnerships, private space exploration and combinations thereof. Two additional videos by Brandon Fibbs were subsequently released in 2012, "Dare Mighty Things: Curiosity on Mars" and "Audacious Visions."

A petition was created in March 2012 on behalf of Penny4NASA using the U.S. White House's We the People petitioning system. The petition argued for a reallocation of funding, stating that the investment would be smaller than recent government expenditures, including the Troubled Asset Relief Program during the 2008 financial crisis. The White House issued an official response to the initial petition, entitled Doubling and Tripling What We Can Accomplish in Space, stating "NASA and space are so important to our future that we do need to be doubling and tripling what we can accomplish in this domain." The White House's response also emphasized fiscal challenges but argued that through effective spending to deliver results, "NASA is as strong as ever."

On August 9, 2012, Penny4NASA published a response in an open letter to White House Office of Science and Technology Policy Director John Holdren, acknowledging fiscal challenges, but adding that they were "concerned that the message of [the] organization and the almost 30,000 individuals who have signed the petition is being overlooked."

As of January 2013, the petition was taken down from the We the People website for not meeting the signature threshold.

== Partner organizations ==
- AmericaSpace.org
- FightForSpace.com
- Moon Landing Day
- NYCAviation
- PopVox
