= Akaflieg Stuttgart fs33 =

Two-seat German glider, 1992

fs33 Gavilán
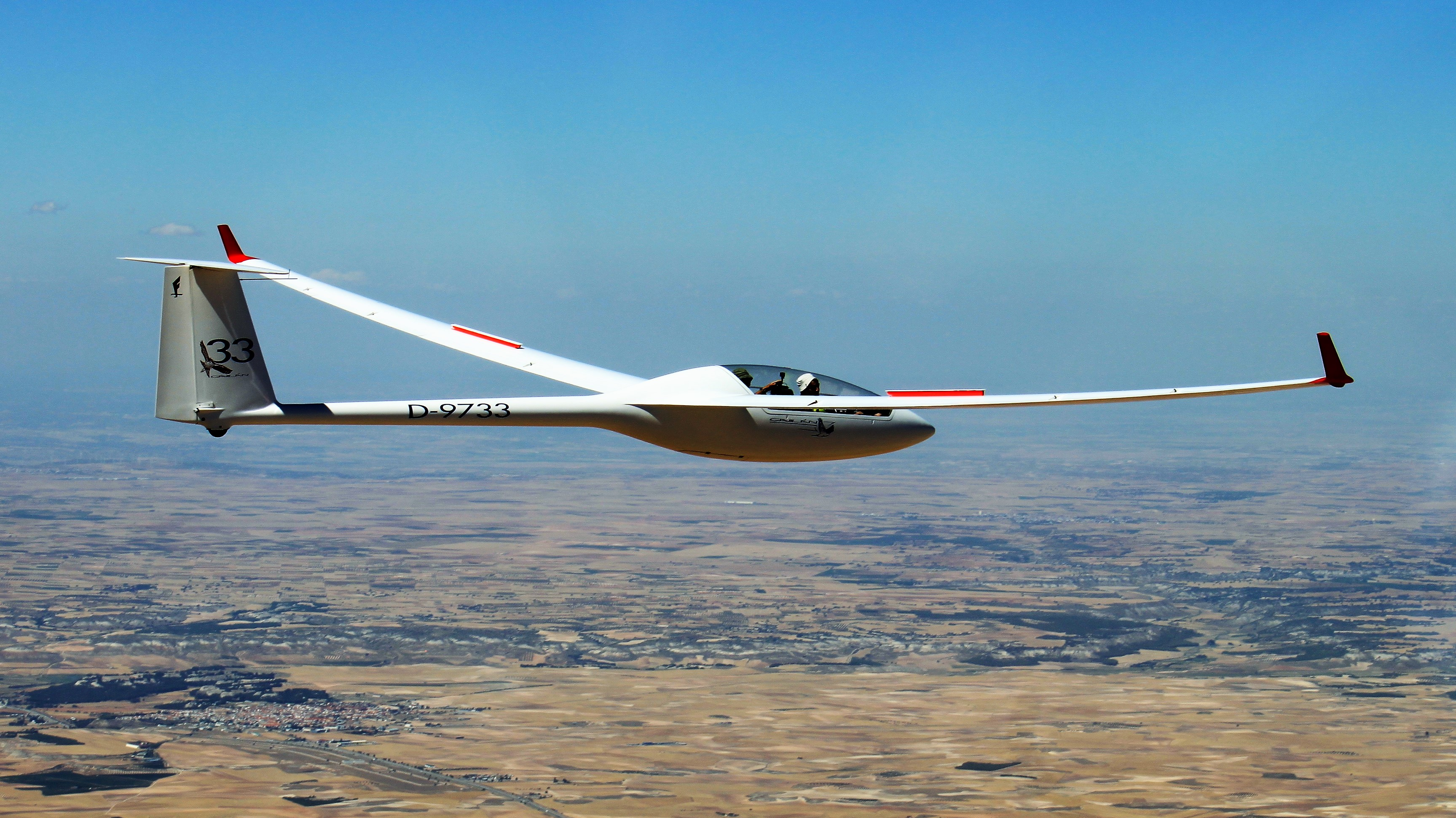
- The fs33 in flight.

General information
- Type: Glider
- National origin: Germany
- Manufacturer: Akaflieg Stuttgart
- Number built: 1

History
- First flight: 28 May 1998

The Akaflieg Stuttgart fs33 Gavilán (Spanish: Hawk) is a high-performance two-seater class sailplane designed and built by Akaflieg Stuttgart.

== Design and development ==
Development of the fs33 began in 1990 in response to the redefinition of the FAI two-seater Competition Class in 1989. Additionally, the aircraft should be of high performance, while also possessing pleasant handling characteristics and being viable for regular usage. The design itself was to be based on experiences gained from older prototypes and production aircraft. The project was also supposed to be completed quickly. This led among other things to the use of pre-existing molds to reduce development and construction time. A further focus of the project was safety.

To achieve the above-mentioned goals, the fuselage molds of the Akaflieg Stuttgart fs31 were reused. Calculations were done based on the fs31's fuselage to determine the optimal geometry and mass for the vertical fin and tailplane, which led to the use of the fin of a Nimbus-3D and tailplane of a Nimbus-4D, though slightly modified to fit the fuselage. Furthermore, most of the control rods in the cockpit, the wheel brakes, and the rear lift pin tube were taken over from the Schleicher ASH 25.

To create the wings, the wing molds of the Akaflieg Stuttgart fs32 were taken and extended inwards by 2,5 meters. Unlike in the fs32, the fs33 doesn't possess slotted flaps due to their complexity, instead using regular flaperons. Due to the lower than expected wing area gain, lightweight construction became an important factor to keep the design's wing loading within acceptable levels.

The fs33 is a two-seater glider with a mid-mounted triple-trapezoidal wing. It has a wingspan of 20 meters and its wings are each equipped with three flaperons along the entire span and optional winglets. Operation of the flaperons is controlled by a mixer located at the wing root and the wings' control connections with the fuselage are automatic.

The aircraft is almost entirely made out of carbon fiber composites, with the cockpit region being instead made out of a carbon-kevlar hybrid. Carbon fiber rovings were used to build the wing spars, while the skin was made of carbon fiber scrims (de) as a weight saving measure.

Both pilots sit in tandem in a cockpit placed forward of the wing, fitted with dual controls, under a long, single-piece canopy. The fuselage is split horizontally, as with the fs31, instead of vertically to improve pilot safety during a crash landing by eliminating a seam on the underside of the cockpit. As an additional safety feature, the wings were designed to break off in the event of a crash landing. Originally the fs33 had an undercarriage constructed from carbon fiber composites with steel fittings to reduce weight, though this was later replaced with a steel one following the aircraft's crash. New winglets were built for the fs33 in 2016.

== Operational history ==
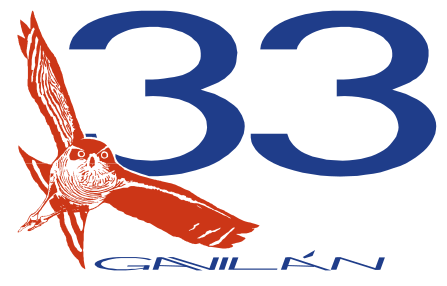
Logo of the fs33 project.

First public display of the aircraft was during the AERO Fair of 1997 in Friedrichshafen. The fs33 achieved its first flight on 28 May 1998 in Aalen-Elchingen. Flight tests in the following years showed that the airbrakes were prone to spontaneously deploying, though this could usually be rectified by simply retracting the airbrakes. There were however two cases in which the airbrakes spontaneously deployed and jammed. The first led to a cancellation of tests and a safe landing on the airfield. The second case of jamming, this time of both airbrakes, led to a crash landing on 11 June 2000, which heavily damaged the aircraft's wings, fuselage, and undercarriage, though both pilot and passenger remained unhurt.

Repairs, which were almost cancelled due to the extensive amount of damage along with the start of the Akaflieg Stuttgart fs34 project, began in October 2000. Work on the wings was done with assistance from Rolf Schmid from Technoflug. Repairs were finished by 2002, with the aircraft flying again on 15 May of that year. Damages were discovered on the aileron hinges in 2014, leading to a complete replacement of the ailerons. The aircraft was again taken out of service in 2016 due to damages to one of the wings.

The fs33 is commonly used by the Akaflieg Stuttgart for gliding competitions.

== Specifications (fs33) ==
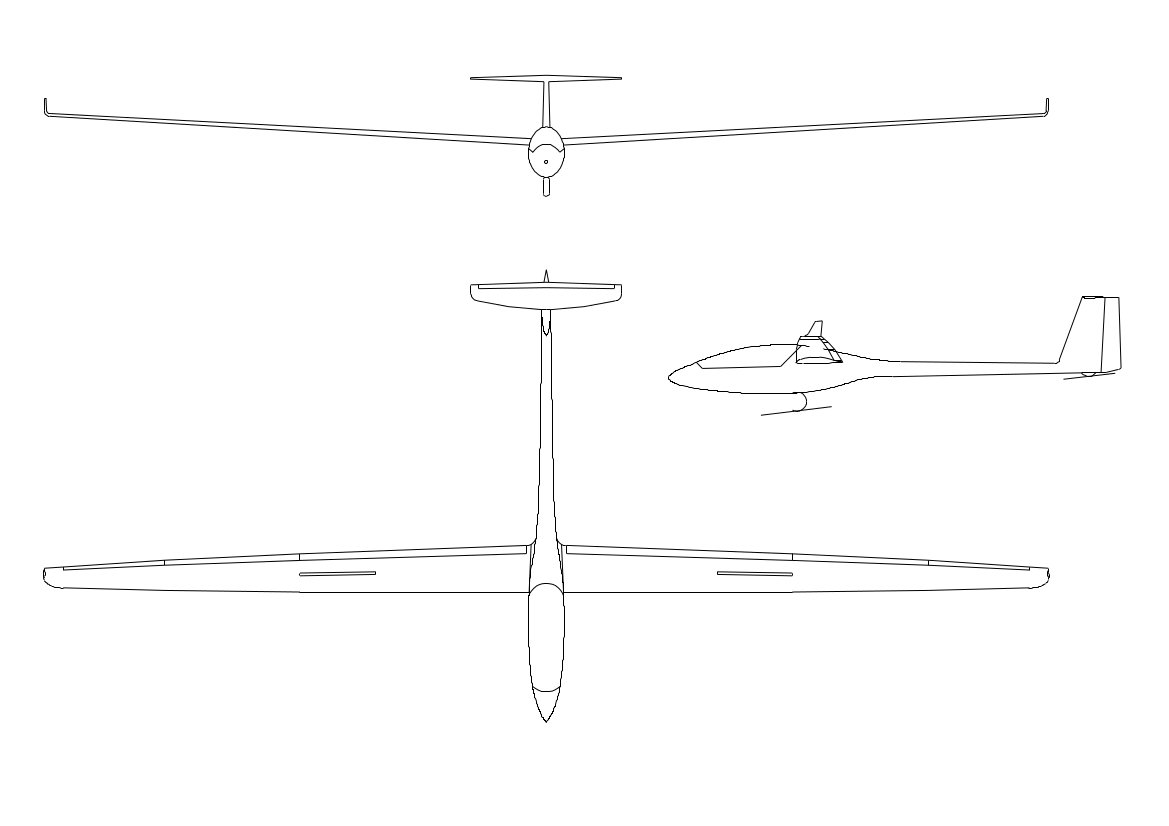
Three-view drawing of the fs33.

Data from Akaflieg Stuttgart

General characteristics

- Crew: 2
- Length: 8.98 m (29 ft 6 in)
- Wingspan: 20.00 m (65 ft 7 in)
- Wing area: 14.43 m^{2} (155.3 sq ft)
- Aspect ratio: 27.7
- Airfoil: AH 81-K-144/17
- Empty weight: 408.5 kg (901 lb)
- Max takeoff weight: 640 kg (1,411 lb)

Performance

- Stall speed: 74 km/h (46 mph, 40 kn)
- Never exceed speed: 280 km/h (170 mph, 150 kn)
- Wing loading: 32.6–44.35 kg/m^{2} (6.68–9.08 lb/sq ft)
