= January 2021 Somalia bombings =

Terrorist incident in Somalia

- Part of Somali Civil War (2009-present)
- Location: Bal'ad, Dinsoor, and near Mogadishu, Somalia
- Date: January 27, 2021
- Target: Somali National Army soldiers, civilians
- Deaths: 18: 15 SNA soldiers; 2 civilians killed; 1 Burundian AMISOM peacekeeper killed
- Injuries: 7: 5+ in Dinsoor; 2 near Mogadishu; Unknown number injured in Bal'ad
- Perpetrator: al-Shabaab

On January 27, 2021, al-Shabaab launched multiple attacks on civilian and military sites across Somalia, killing sixteen people and injuring several more. The deadliest attack was an ambush by al-Shabaab on a Somali and AMISOM convoy in Bal'ad, which killed 14 people.

== Background ==
Al-Shabaab, a jihadist group that has waged an insurgency in Somalia since 2009, began an offensive against Somali National Army forces in Middle Shabelle on January 23. The fighting began with al-Shabaab's capture of the village of Rage-Ceele. Al-Shabaab then began deploying fighters around Somali-controlled cities including Jowhar and Bal'ad.

== Attacks ==
The attacks on January 27 were all coordinated by al-Shabaab. The first attack began in Dinsoor, Bay region, at a restaurant while security forces and civilians were dining in the morning. One soldier was killed in the attack and at least five others were wounded. A roadside bomb also injured two construction workers near Mogadishu. Near Bal'ad, a joint Somali and Burundian AMISOM convoy was bombed by al-Shabaab militants, killing an unknown number of people. The bombing sparked clashes between the Somali-Burundian forces and al-Shabaab. Somali reinforcements from Jowhar were also ambushed along the way to the bombing site. Fifteen people were killed in the bombing at Bal'ad, including twelve Somali soldiers, two civilians, and one Burundian peacekeeper. An unknown number of soldiers and peacekeepers were wounded and transported to a hospital in Jowhar.
