= Tempair International Airlines =

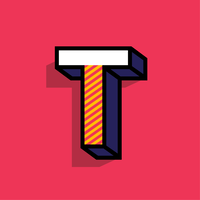
- Founded: 1972
- Ceased operations: 29 November 1976
- Parent company: Templewood Aviation International
- Headquarters: Windsor, Berkshire, England

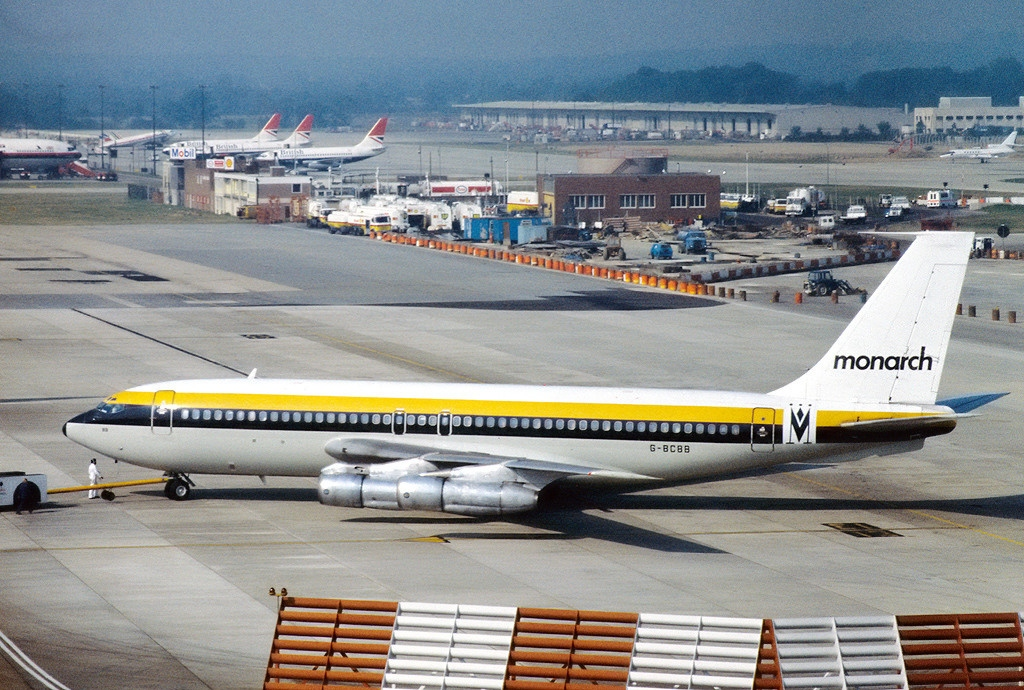
Boeing 720 Tempair leased to Monarch Airlines in 1976

Tempair International Airlines Ltd, more commonly known as Tempair, was a UK-based aircraft lease operator, founded in 1972. The airline was headquartered in Windsor, Berkshire. Mounting financial difficulties led to the liquidation of the company in late 1976.

== History ==
The company was formed in 1972 as a subsidiary of Templewood Aviation Ltd. Since its main activity relied upon wet-leasing aircraft to other airlines, the company never operated services in its own right, but did so on other carriers' behalf; it also provided operating expertise and flight crews as required. Although Tempair was a UK-registered airline, it had neither an operation certificate nor a license from that country. Biman Bangladesh Airlines, DETA Mozambique Airlines, Merpati Nusantara and Somali Airlines were among the customers of Tempair.

In June 1973, a Tempair Boeing 707-320 operated on behalf of Biman Bangladesh Airlines inaugurated the Dhaka–London route for the recently created Bangladeshi flag carrier.

In 1974, two Boeing 707-320s previously operated by Türk Hava Yollari were acquired. Throughout its history, Tempair operated Boeing 720Bs, Boeing 707s (-320 and -320C series), and Vanguards.

In November 1975, Tempair won a contract worth US$1,500,000 (equivalent to $8,974,954 in 2025) to fly pilgrims from Nigeria to Saudi Arabia and back, during the Hajj season, on behalf of Nigeria Airways. In December the same year the airline, competing with Qantas, Trans Australia Airlines and Ansett, won a contract for operating a Boeing 720B on Air Niugini's behalf, as well as for providing the cabin and flight staff, and the maintenance of the aircraft.

Following financial difficulties, the company ceased operations in late 1976, when a board meeting held on 29 November that year decided to liquidate the firm.

== See also ==
- Air transport in the United Kingdom
- Transport in the United Kingdom
