= Hiiraan Online =

Canada-based Somali news website

- Available in: English, Somali
- Founded: 1999
- Headquarters: Ottawa, {{{location_country}}}
- Country of origin: Somalia
- Area served: Somalia & Horn of Africa
- Founder: Ahmed Gure
- Website: hiiraan.com

Hiiraan Online (HOL) is a website dedicated to news and information about Somalia and the Horn of Africa. It was founded in 1999 to deliver news to the growing Somali diaspora and is also based in Somalia. It is run and based in Ottawa, Canada.

It is published in English and Somali and discusses Somali news and affairs. In 2019, it was described as a leading Somali news website.

== History ==
Hiiraan Online was originally founded in Ottawa, Canada, on July 1, 1999. Its founder, Ahmed Gure, a former airline captain with Somali Airlines, started the website to serve the growing Somali diaspora. On 28 June 2011, HOL reporter Faysal Mohamed Hassan who was stationed in Puntland was detained after reporting that two beheaded bodies found near a road in the city of Bosaso were part of the region's security services. On 2 July, a lower court convicted him on charges of "endangering state security and publishing a 'false news report'." He was later released after spending 33 days in the city's prison.

== Content ==
The website publishes news articles, opinions, and political commentary. It also hosts job advertisements for international bodies, government agencies and NGOs.
