= Somali Airlines =

Flag carrier of Somalia

Somali Airlines الخطوط الجوية الصومالية al-Khuṭūṭ al-Jawwiyah aṣ-Ṣūmāliyah

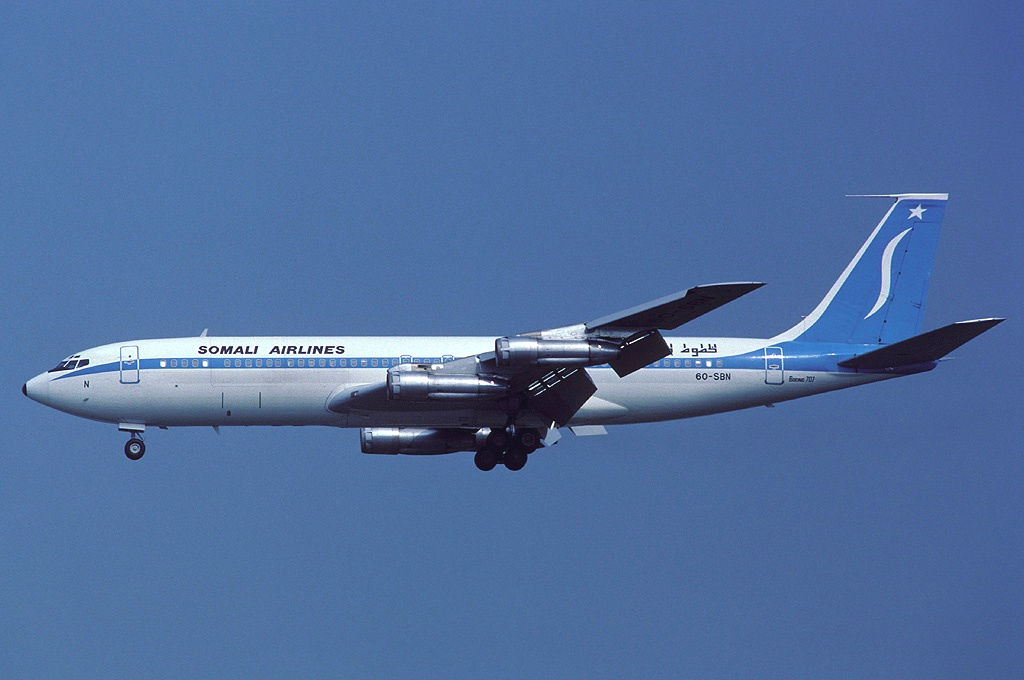
- A Somali Airlines Boeing 707-338C in 1984
IATA	ICAO	Call sign
HH	SOM	SOMALAIR
- Founded: 5 March 1964
- Commenced operations: July 1964
- Hubs: Mogadishu International Airport
- Secondary hubs: Hargeisa International Airport
- Parent company: Government of Somalia
- Headquarters: Mogadishu, Somalia
- Key people: Abdulahi Iman (CEO)
- Website: somaliairlines.so

Somali Airlines is the flag carrier of Somalia. Established in 1964, it historically offered flights to both domestic and international destinations. The airline discontinued operations in 1991 after the start of the Somali civil war, and was officially relaunched by the Somali government on 28 July 2025, with an initial purchase agreement for two Airbus A320 aircraft.

== History ==
=== General ===
Somali Airlines was founded on 5 March 1964 as the newly independent Somalia's national airline. The country's then civilian government and Alitalia owned equal shares in the company, with each holding a 50% controlling stake. Under a five-year agreement, Alitalia provided the airline with technical support. According to Somali Airlines' Director at the time, Abdulahi Shireh, the carrier was established primarily to more effectively connect the capital Mogadishu to other regions in the nation.

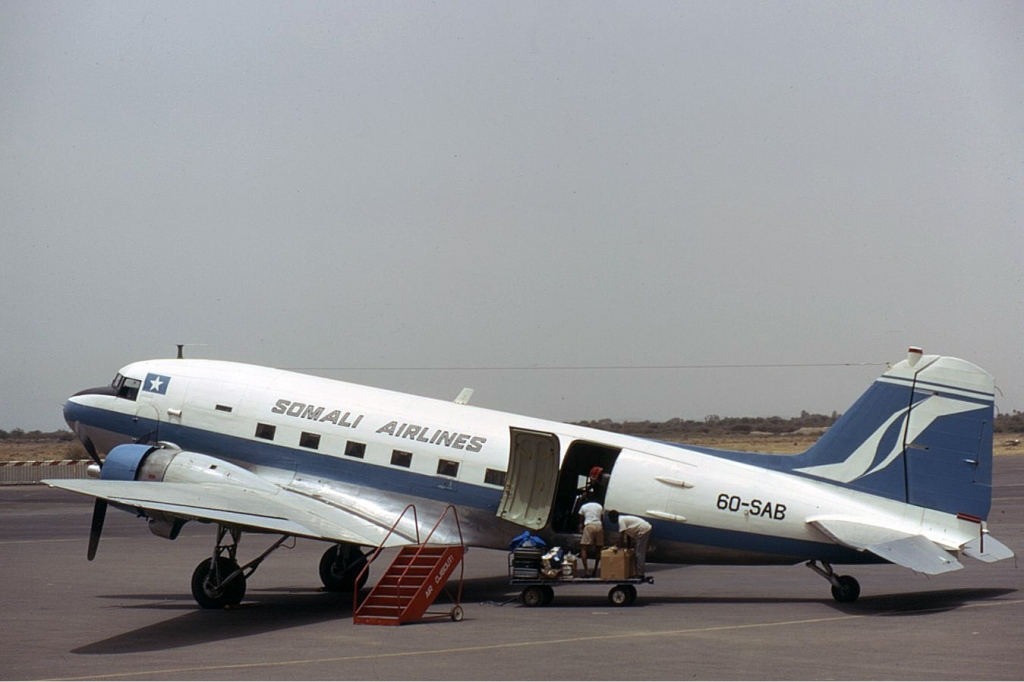
Douglas DC-3, the first aircraft type operated by Somali Airlines (pictured in 1972)

Shortly after the carrier was formed, four Douglas DC-3s were donated by the United States. The airline began operations in July 1964, initially serving domestic destinations with a fleet of three DC-3s and two Cessna 180s. Prior to this, local services had been operated by Aden Airways. The Mogadishu–Aden run kept being flown under a pool agreement with Aden Airways until March 1965, when Somali Airlines embarked on serving the route to this destination with its own aircraft. A service to Nairobi was later launched in January 1966. It was discontinued in June the same year, after the carrier was banned from flying into Kenyan airspace following Radio Mogadishu airing verbal attacks against the Kenyan President Jomo Kenyatta. A weekly service to Dar-es-Salaam was introduced in October 1967.

At March 1970, the airline's president was Abdi Mohamed Namus, who employed 120 workers. At this time, the fleet consisted of two Cessna 185s, three DC-3s and four Viscount 700s. One of these Viscounts (6O-AAJ) experienced an accident while landing at Mogadishu on 6 May 1970. The aircraft was on final approach when the crew realised that the flight controls were not responding. Control of the aircraft was partly gained by the use of power, but the airframe landed hard, causing the nose gear to collapse. Five people were killed in the accident, out of 30 occupants on board. In early 1974, a contract with Tempair for the provision of a Boeing 720B, to be deployed on the Mogadishu–London route, as well as on flights within Africa and to the Middle East, was signed; the agreement effectively came into being in April 1974. In late 1975, two Fokker F27s were acquired. In 1976, the company purchased two Boeing 720Bs from American Airlines, the two last ones in service with the American carrier. It also ordered a further two Boeing 707s. Somali Airlines later became a fully state-owned company in 1977, when the government acquired 49% of the shares held by Alitalia.

By July 1980, the fleet consisted of two Boeing 707-320Cs, two Boeing 720Bs, two Fokker F27-600s, two DC-3s, one Cessna 402 and one Cessna 180. Colonel Mohamoud Gulaid was appointed chairman and CEO during 1983. At 1985, the number of employees was 714 and the fleet had reduced to include two Boeing 707-320Cs and two F.27-600s, with routes operated from Berbera and Mogadishu to Abu Dhabi, Cairo, Frankfurt, Jeddah, Nairobi and Rome. In February 1987, a new route to Banjul and Conakry was launched, and a firm order for an Airbus A310-300 was placed late that year, with an option for another one; the aircraft was aimed at replacing the 707 fleet on routes to Europe and the Middle East.

=== Suspension ===
Due to the outbreak of the civil war all of the carrier's operations were officially suspended in 1991. The void created by the collapse of the airline has since been filled by various Somali-owned private carriers, such as Jubba Airways, Daallo Airlines and Puntair.

=== Relaunch ===
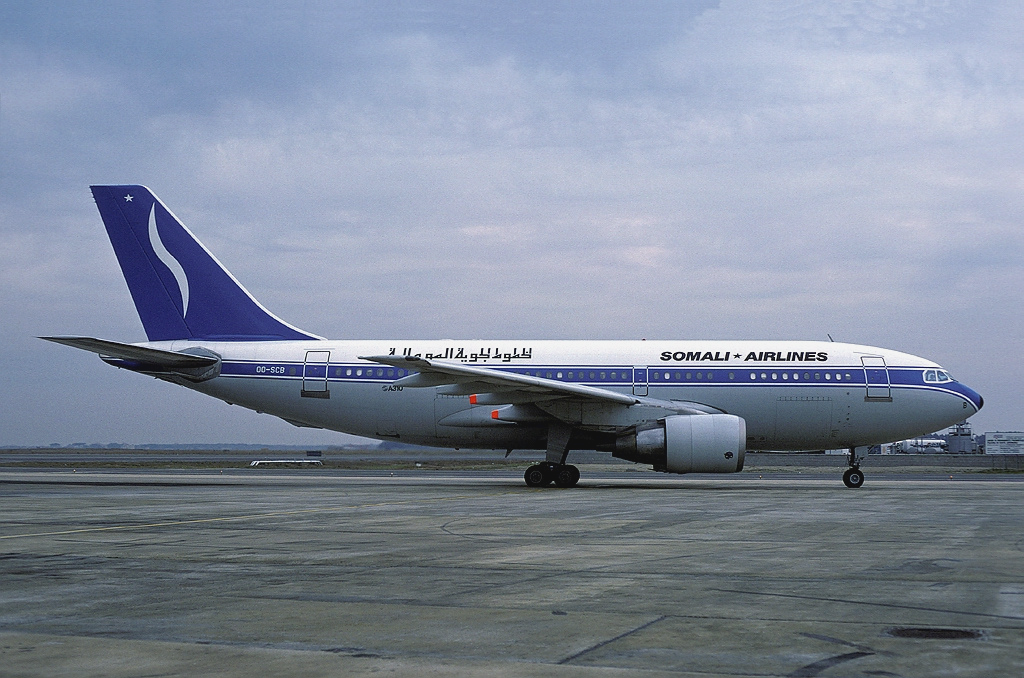
Somali Airlines Airbus A310-200 at Fiumicino Airport (1989)

In April 2012, former Somali Airlines pilots, Abikar Nur and Ahmed Elmi Gure, met with aviation officials at the Lufthansa Flight Training Center in Phoenix, United States, to discuss the possibility of resuming the historic working relationship between Somali Airlines and Lufthansa. The meeting ended with a pledge by the school's chairman, Captain Matthias Kippenberg, to assist the Somali aviation authorities in training prospective pilots.

In July 2012, Mohammed Osman Ali (Dhagah-tur), the General Director of the Ministry of Aviation and Transport, announced that the Somali government had begun preparations to revive the national carrier, Somali Airlines. The Somali authorities along with the Somali Civil Aviation Steering Committee (SCASC) — a joint commission composed of officials from Somalia's federal and regional governments as well as members of the CACAS, ICAO/TCB and UNDP, convened with international aviation groups in Montreal to request support for the ongoing rehabilitation efforts. The SCASC set a three-year window for reconstruction of the national civil aviation capacity. It also requested the complete transfer of Somali civil aviation operations and assets from the CACAS caretaker body to the Somali authorities.

In November 2013, the German-based Skyliner reported that a new Boeing 737-400 cargo airliner was scheduled to be transferred from Budapest airport to Mogadishu by the end of December. The plane was concurrently being painted in the Somali national colours ahead of delivery. A staff representative for the Slovakian SAMair company, Zsolt Kovács, also indicated that another aircraft was also undergoing construction at the airport and that both planes had been purchased from SAMair by the Somali federal authorities on behalf of Somali Airlines.

In December 2017, Somalia’s Minister of Transport, Mohamed Abdullahi Salad, held a closed-door meeting with former employees of Somali Airlines. The meeting focused on early discussions around reviving the national carrier and evaluating the steps required to bring it back.

Later that month, Somalia took back full control of its airspace for the first time in 27 years. The responsibility was handed over to the Somali Civil Aviation Authority in Mogadishu, ending years of management from outside the country.

In October 2022, the Ministry of Transport and Civil Aviation announced the formation of a seven-member committee. The committee was tasked with drafting a plan to relaunch Somali Airlines. They were given one month to assess the viability of reviving Somali Airlines and to submit a comprehensive report within 30 days.

In January 2023, Somalia’s airspace was upgraded to Class A after almost 30 years of disruption. The Somali Civil Aviation Authority began managing Class A airspace over the Mogadishu Flight Information Region (FIR), following coordination with the International Civil Aviation Organization (ICAO).

In 2024, in an interview on Somali National Television (SNTV), Director of the Somali Civil Aviation Authority affirmed the government’s operational readiness. He said the authority is fully prepared and has the capacity to certify the airline, issue air operator approvals, and license both flight crew and maintenance personnel. He emphasized that if Somali Airlines were to commence operations tomorrow, all necessary regulatory support is already in place.

He also revealed that he served on the committee overseeing the relaunch preparations. According to him, the committee has successfully resolved all outstanding legacy documentation, regulatory challenges, operational issues, and other matters inherited from the former Somali Airlines.

Also in 2024, the Somali government began training future Somali Airlines pilots through the newly established Gamtecs Aviation Academy in Mogadishu. The academy, which does not admit members of the general public, recruited certified instructors and launched training programs exclusively for government-assigned cadets. Training utilized two Cessna aircraft, 6O-AAK (Cessna 172RG) and 6O-AAJ (Cessna FR172J), for initial flight instruction.

According to Somali National Television, cadets who successfully complete their Private Pilot Licence in Mogadishu would be sent to Italy, specifically Milan, thorough a government partnership with an Italian flight school. There they will pursue advanced certifications including the Commercial Pilot License (CPL), Airline Transport Pilot License (ATPL), and aircraft type ratings. The report said that some pilots will work for Somali Airlines and others will join the Somali Air Force.

On 23 March 2025, the Minister of Transport and Civil Aviation, Mohamed Abdullahi Farah, stated the government’s intention to bring Somali Airlines back into service. He confirmed that the first phase would focus on regional flights and rebuilding the airline step by step.

Following the March announcement, in May 2025, the government appointed Abdulahi Iman as the airline’s Chief Executive Officer. The move marked the first tangible step toward the airline’s operational revival, transitioning from planning to implementation.

=== Official revival ===
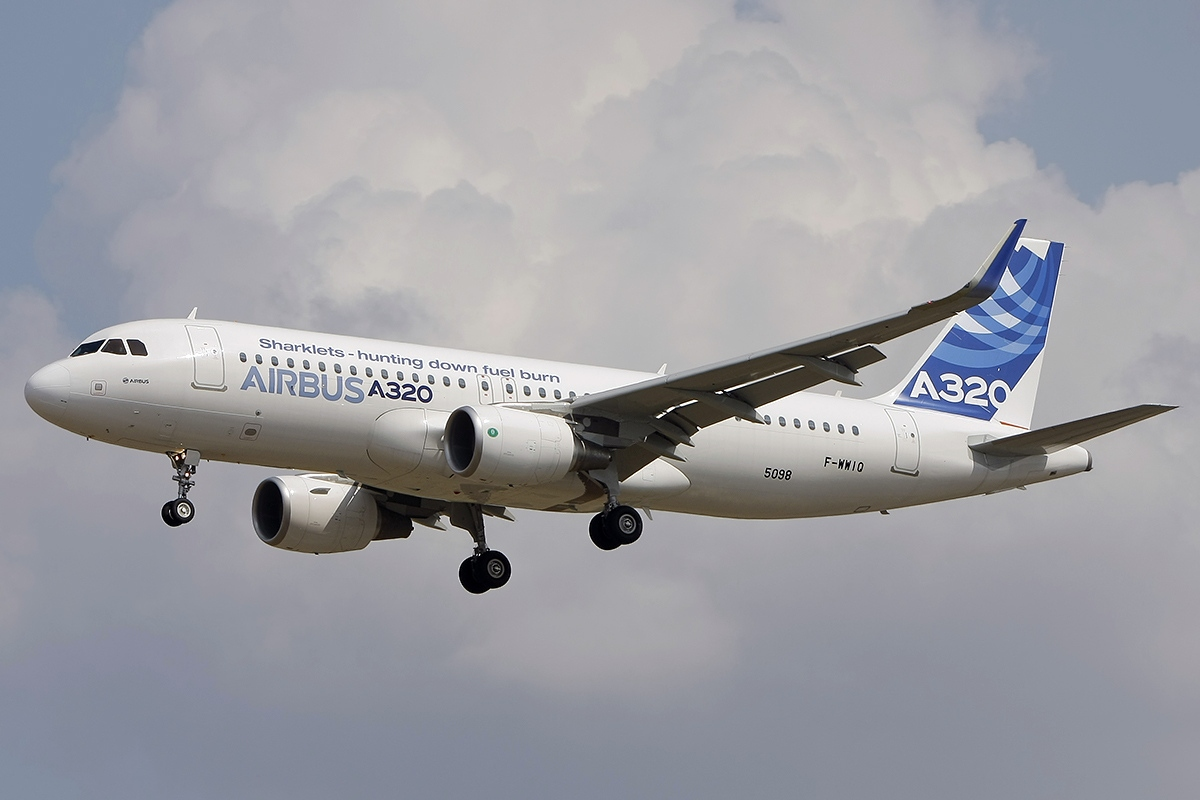
An Airbus A320 (pictured), the aircraft type selected for Somali Airlines' planned relaunch in 2026

On 28 July 2025, the Somali government officially revived Somali Airlines after 34 years without operations in international and regional routes. Speaking on SNTV, the Minister of Transport announced that a purchase agreement was signed with Lema Holdings (a global holding company with interests across various sectors) for two Airbus A320 aircraft, and he confirmed that the deal was finalized at the Prime Minister's office in Mogadishu after several months of negotiations, including meetings held in multiple countries.

The Minister stated that the airline is expected to commence operations within two months, with further acquisitions anticipated. He emphasized that the revival aims to reduce dependency on foreign carriers, expand access for the Somali diaspora, create employment opportunities for young professionals, and support national economic development. This effort, he said, is part of a broader self-reliance strategy under the administration of President Hassan Sheikh Mohamud and Prime Minister Hamza Abdi Barre. He also affirmed that the aircraft were purchased by the Somali government and are owned by the Somali people, reflecting the country's intention to reestablish its civil aviation sector. He also indicated plans to expand the fleet with an immediate goal of acquiring at least three more planes beyond the initial two Airbus A320s, potentially including larger aircraft for international routes.

On 27 October, the Minister declared the final preparations were in place and that Somali Airlines was poised to resume operation by the beginning of 2026. He stated "I want to share good news with the Somali people – before the end of this year, Somali Airlines will officially resume operations."

Somali Airlines' services are officially due to resume in September 2026.

== Destinations ==
The following is a list of destinations the airline served throughout its history:

Country	City	Airport	Refs
Djibouti	Djibouti City	Djibouti–Ambouli International Airport	
Egypt	Cairo	Cairo International Airport	
Germany	Frankfurt	Frankfurt Airport	
Italy	Rome	Leonardo da Vinci–Fiumicino Airport	
Kenya	Nairobi	Jomo Kenyatta International Airport	
Qatar	Doha	Doha International Airport	
Saudi Arabia	Jeddah	King Abdulaziz International Airport	
Seychelles	Mahé	Seychelles International Airport	
Somalia	Berbera	Berbera Airport	
Somalia	Hargeisa	Hargeisa International Airport	
Somalia	Kismayo	Kismayo Airport	
Somalia	Mogadishu	Aden Adde International Airport	
United Arab Emirates	Abu Dhabi	Zayed International Airport	
United Arab Emirates	Dubai	Dubai International Airport	
Yemen	Aden	Aden International Airport	

== Fleet ==
As of August 2025, Somali Airlines has the following aircraft on order:

Somali Airlines fleet
Aircraft	Orders	Passengers			Notes
Aircraft	Orders	B	E	Total	Notes
Airbus A320	2	TBA	TBA	TBA	The airline purchased two A320s to form its initial fleet.
Total	2				

== Former fleet ==
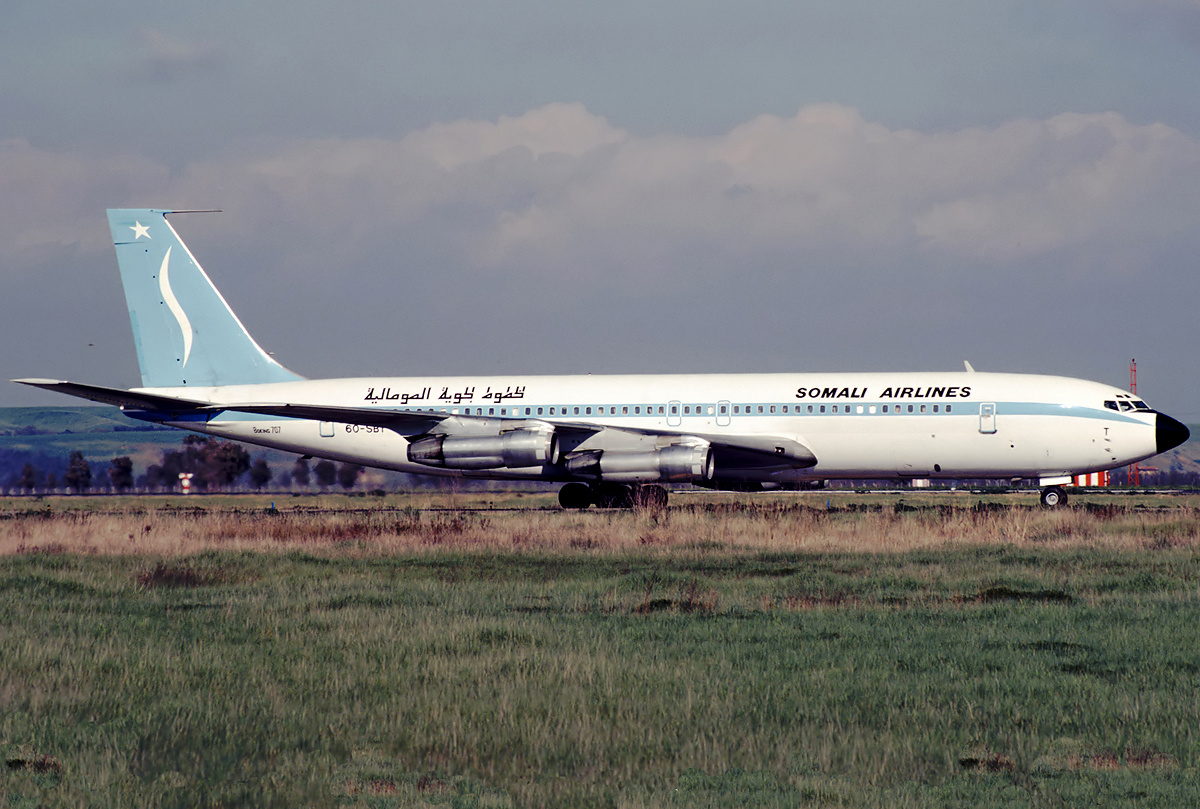
A Somali Airlines Boeing 707-320B at Fiumicino Airport (1989).

Somali Airlines operated the following aircraft all through its history:

- Airbus A310-200
- Airbus A310-300
- Boeing 707-120B
- Boeing 707-320
- Boeing 707-320B
- Boeing 707-320C
- Boeing 720B
- Boeing 727-200
- Douglas C-47A
- Fokker F27-200
- Fokker F27-600
- Viscount 742D

== Accidents and incidents ==
According to Aviation Safety Network, Somali Airlines experienced six events throughout its history; five of the occurrences carried with the hull-loss of the aircraft involved, and three of them had fatalities.

Date	Location	Aircraft	Tail number	Aircraft damage	Fatalities	Description	Refs
6 May 1970	(Somalia) Mogadishu	Viscount 700	6O-AAJ	W/O	5/30	The aircraft was on final approach to Mogadishu International Airport when control was lost due to a fire that erupted in the cargo hold. Upon a nose-down landing, the nosegear collapsed and the airplane continued rolling on her nose until it came to rest. The fire intensified, eventually engulfing the fuselage and destroying it completely.	
16 August 1975	(Somalia) Bosaso	Douglas C-47A	6O-SAC	W/O	0/11	Crashed shortly after takeoff from Bosaso Airport, following a failure on the port engine.	
20 July 1981	(Somalia) Balad	F-27-600RF	6O-SAY	W/O	50/50	Flight 40 crashed near Balad and burned out, minutes after take-off from Mogadishu International Airport on a domestic scheduled Mogadishu–Hargeisa passenger service. The aircraft encountered severe turbulence on its flight path when it entered an area of heavy rain and started to dive. The stresses the airframe went through during the dive—up to 5.76 g—exceeded the ones it could possibly withstand, and parts of the starboard wing got detached.	
17 May 1989	(Kenya) Nairobi	707-320B	6O-SBT	W/O	0/70	Overran the wet runway at Jomo Kenyatta International Airport following an aborted take-off.	
28 June 1989	(Somalia) Hargeisa	F27-200RF	6O-SAZ	W/O	30/30	Rebels claimed to have shot down the aircraft, that had departed from Hargeisa International Airport bound for Mogadishu, during initial climbout.	
6 March 1991	(Somalia) Mogadishu	—N/a	—N/a	—N/a	0	Gunshots fired at a Somali Airlines aircraft at Mogadishu Airport following an attempt by an armed group of individuals to board an Italian cargo plane "that had just landed to deliver relief supplies to refugees. There were arrests but no injuries reported in the incident."	

== See also ==
- Transport in Somalia

== Bibliography ==
- Guttery, Ben R. (1998). Encyclopedia of African Airlines. Jefferson, NC: McFarland & Company. ISBN 0-7864-0495-7.
