= Akaflieg Stuttgart fs31 =

Training sailplane from the 1980s

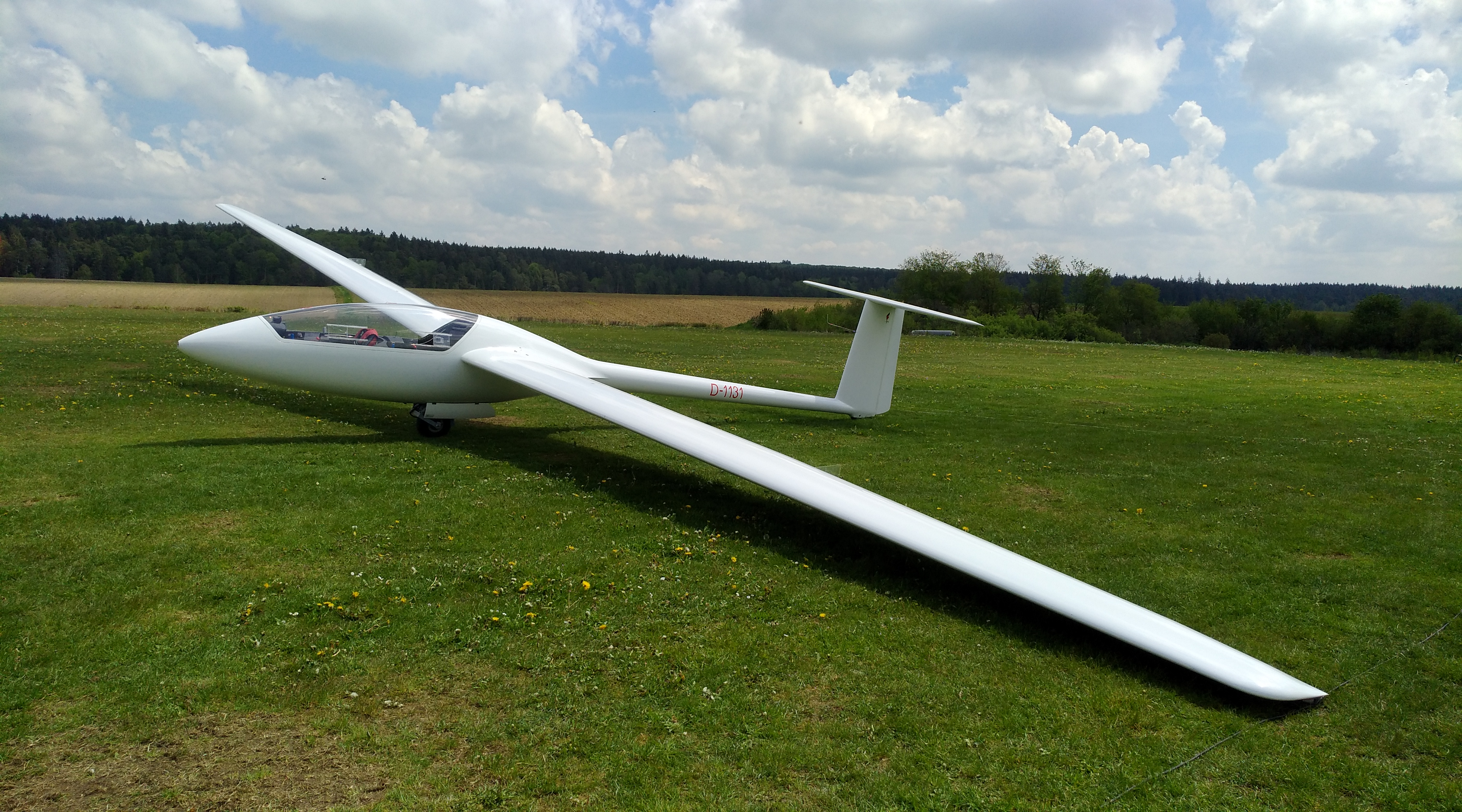

General information
- Type: Glider
- National origin: West Germany
- Manufacturer: Akaflieg Stuttgart
- Number built: 1

History
- First flight: 30 December 1981
- Developed into: Schleicher AS 22-2; Akaflieg Stuttgart fs33 Akaflieg Braunschweig SB 15

The Akaflieg Stuttgart fs31 Ferdinand Porsche is a tandem seat, dual control training glider designed and built in Germany between 1977 and 1981. The aircraft was intended to have high performance, yet to be robust enough for student use. It was not intended for production and remains in service with the Akaflieg after almost 40 years and 7,100 flying hours.

== Design and development ==
The Akaflieg Stuttgart or Akademische Fliegergruppe Stuttgart (English: The Stuttgart Academic Flying Group) is one of some fourteen German student flying groups attached to and supported by their home Technical University. Several have designed and built aircraft, often technically advanced and leading the development of gliders in particular.

The students of the Stuttgart Akaflieg designed the fs31 as a high performance, tandem seat training sailplane to replace their earlier aircraft, further inspired by the purchase of a set of wings from the Grob G 103 Twin Astir prototype in 1977. Furthermore, the then new carbon Kevlar hybrid material was to be used to reduce weight. Energy dissipation and a locally strong cockpit area were further design objectives. Benign stall characteristics and a strong, long-stroke, monowheel undercarriage also make it suitable for student pilots.

The fs31 has mid-mounted, straight tapered wings with 4° of dihedral, taken from the Twin Astir prototype. Its T-tail, from the Glasflügel 604, has a narrow chord, weakly tapered tailplane. The aircraft's control surfaces are made from a Kevlar-sandwich. Instructor and pupil sit in tandem in a cockpit placed forward of the wing, fitted with dual controls, under a long, single-piece canopy. The fuselage, which narrows to a slender boom behind the wing trailing edge, is similar to that of the Akaflieg Stuttgart fs29, though carbon/Kevlar replaces the earlier aircraft's GRP polymeric foam sandwich structure. Furthermore, the fuselage shells are split horizontally instead of vertically to improve pilot safety during a crash landing by eliminating a seam on the underside of the cockpit. The undercarriage is retractable and is also based on that of the fs29.

The fs31 first flew on 30 December 1981. Some improvements were made to the wing root-fuselage junction during flight testing in the summer of 1982. The aircraft's fuselage design served as the basis for the Schleicher AS 22-2, later developed into the ASH 25, the Akaflieg Stuttgart fs33, and the Akaflieg Braunschweig SB 15.

== Operational history ==
The sole fs31 was still undergoing field trial when it won the Klippeneck gliding competition of July 1982. It entered service with the Akaflieg Stuttgart in April 1983 and since then it has served in its intended role of trainer for almost 40 years, logging over 7,100 flying hours and 23,000 takeoffs.

== Specifications ==
Data from Akaflieg Stuttgart

General characteristics

- Crew: 2
- Length: 8.82 m (28 ft 11 in)
- Wingspan: 17.50 m (57 ft 5 in)
- Wing area: 17.76 m^{2} (191.2 sq ft)
- Aspect ratio: 17.2
- Airfoil: Eppler E 603 modified
- Empty weight: 397.79 kg (877 lb)
- Max takeoff weight: 560 kg (1,235 lb)

Performance

- Stall speed: 60 km/h (37 mph, 32 kn)
- Never exceed speed: 250 km/h (160 mph, 130 kn)
