= Akaflieg Stuttgart fs32 =

Single-seat German glider, 1992

fs32 Aguila

General information
- Type: Glider
- National origin: Germany
- Manufacturer: Akaflieg Stuttgart
- Number built: 1

History
- First flight: 18 February 1992

The Akaflieg Stuttgart fs32, nicknamed Aguila (Spanish: Eagle) is a sailplane designed and built in Germany in 1992.

== Specifications ==
Data from Akaflieg Stuttgart, All-Aero

General characteristics

- Crew: 1
- Length: 6.62 m (21 ft 9 in)
- Wingspan: 15.00 m (49 ft 3 in)
- Wing area: 9.94 m^{2} (107.0 sq ft)
- Aspect ratio: 22.65
- Airfoil: FX 81-K-144/20
- Empty weight: 255 kg (562 lb)
- Max takeoff weight: 500 kg (1,102 lb)

Performance

- Maximum glide ratio: 43:1 at 105 km/h (65 mph; 57 kn)
- Rate of sink: 0.6 m/s (120 ft/min) at 85 km/h (53 mph; 46 kn)
- Wing loading: 50.3 kg/m^{2} (10.3 lb/sq ft)
