= Aero León =

- Founded: May 1978; 48 years ago (as Aero León S.A de C.V.)
- Ceased operations: September 1983; 42 years ago
- Hubs: Benito Juarez International Airport
- Fleet size: 5
- Destinations: 10

Aero León S.A de C.V was a cargo airline based in Mexico City. Founded by Eucario León, it operated between 1951 and 1984.

== History ==
Aero León cargo airline was founded in 1951 by the captain Eucario León, a former fighter pilot of the Mexican Air Force. It started as a bush operation with a Piper Tri-pacer PA-22 on flights between Tehuacan, Usila Oaxaca, and Teutila Oaxaca. The airline was formally called the airline Aeroleon in 1978.

In March 1980, Aero León received two Douglas DC-8-24 planes and started flights to Central and South America. By 1983, it was named the greatest Gates Learjet sales representative in the world after it sold 32 aircraft in one single year.

Captain Leon had an accident in 1984, which left him paralytic and led to closure of the airline in 1985. By 1992, he returned into the cargo business again with a new airline, LAMCASA with Convair 340, Airbus A300 and Boeing 727-200 aircraft, which operated from 1994 till 2004, when captain Leon died from brain cancer.

== Accidents and incidents ==
- In April 1983, an Aero León Douglas DC-8 had an incident while it was carrying cattle to Brazil. The aircraft suffered a rapid depressurization event after a bull broke free from its cage. The aircraft would make an emergency landing at an airport, where the cattle was found dead upon landing due to the event. The crew of the DC-8 was later nicknamed "The greatest bullfighters".
- On May 21, 1981, a Convair CV-440 Metropolitan took off from Puerto Escondido with the destination of Oaxaca de Juárez with 21 passengers and 3 crew on board. While the aircraft was cruising, the Convair CV-440 struck the side of Mt. Pinarete in the Sierra Madre de Oaxaca mountain range. A few hours after the crash, rescuers found the wreckage of the Convair on the side of the mountain. All 3 crew members and 21 passengers died in the crash. The probable cause was controlled flight into terrain.

== Destinations ==
Until March 1983, destinations of Aero León included:

- Mexico City
- Toluca
- Monterrey
- San Luis Potosí
- Guadalajara
- Cancún
- Buenos Aires
- Manaus
- Rio de Janeiro
- Caracas
- Oaxaca

== Fleet ==
Aero Leon fleet
Aircraft	Total	Orders	Passengers	Notes
Douglas DC-8	2	0	0	XA-LSA & N995WL. N995WL was involved in a mid-air incident while transporting cattle.
Convair CV-440 Metropolitan	2	0	52	One CV-440 (XA-KEH) crashed in the Sierra Madre de Oaxaca in Oaxaca, Mexico. none survived
Cessna 500 Citation	1	0	5	XA-DAJ most likely used for crew only
