= Klippeneck =

Coordinates: 48°06′18″N 8°45′21″E

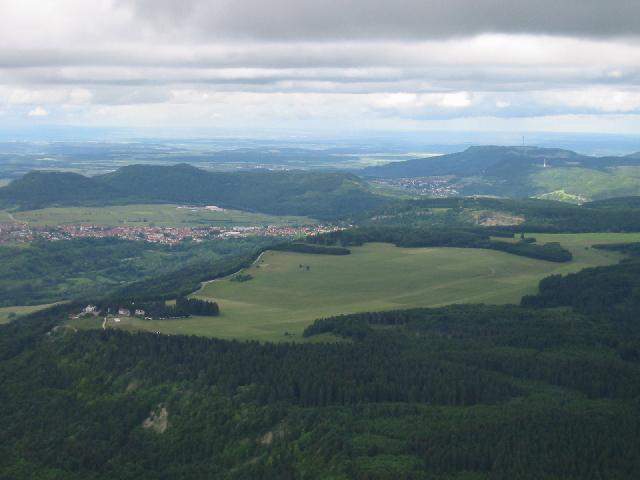

Highest point
- Elevation: 980 m (3,220 ft)

Geography
- Location: Baden-Württemberg, Germany

Klippeneck is a corner of the Großer Heuberg plateau in Baden-Württemberg, Germany.

It is known for a gliding airfield.

A favourite place to visit on the Swabian Alb is the Dreifaltigkeitsberg (Holy Trinity Hill) with its 985-metre-high (3,232 ft) summit and its famous pilgrimage church. The path runs along part of the Donauberglandweg (Danube mountain country path), which has been awarded the seal of “Qualitätsweg Wanderbares Deutschland” (“Walkable Germany’s Quality Paths”) by the German Ramblers association.

== Climate ==
Climate data for Klippeneck: 974m (1991−2020)
| Month | Jan | Feb | Mar | Apr | May | Jun | Jul | Aug | Sep | Oct | Nov | Dec | Year |
|---|---|---|---|---|---|---|---|---|---|---|---|---|---|
| Mean daily maximum °C (°F) | 2.1 (35.8) | 2.9 (37.2) | 6.8 (44.2) | 11.4 (52.5) | 15.3 (59.5) | 19.2 (66.6) | 21.4 (70.5) | 20.9 (69.6) | 16.6 (61.9) | 11.8 (53.2) | 6.2 (43.2) | 2.9 (37.2) | 11.5 (52.6) |
| Daily mean °C (°F) | −0.8 (30.6) | −0.5 (31.1) | 2.7 (36.9) | 6.7 (44.1) | 10.5 (50.9) | 14.3 (57.7) | 16.2 (61.2) | 16.1 (61.0) | 11.9 (53.4) | 7.9 (46.2) | 3.1 (37.6) | 0.1 (32.2) | 7.4 (45.2) |
| Mean daily minimum °C (°F) | −3.5 (25.7) | −3.3 (26.1) | −0.7 (30.7) | 2.7 (36.9) | 6.4 (43.5) | 10.0 (50.0) | 12.0 (53.6) | 11.8 (53.2) | 8.3 (46.9) | 4.7 (40.5) | 0.5 (32.9) | −2.4 (27.7) | 3.9 (39.0) |
| Average precipitation mm (inches) | 60.8 (2.39) | 50.4 (1.98) | 54.4 (2.14) | 61.7 (2.43) | 104.7 (4.12) | 102.0 (4.02) | 114.0 (4.49) | 94.1 (3.70) | 66.1 (2.60) | 69.7 (2.74) | 63.8 (2.51) | 69.5 (2.74) | 913.1 (35.95) |
| Average precipitation days (≥ 1.0 mm) | 16.5 | 15.1 | 15.3 | 15.1 | 17.0 | 15.8 | 16.0 | 15.0 | 13.4 | 14.6 | 15.6 | 18.6 | 187.9 |
| Average relative humidity (%) | 84.4 | 81.0 | 76.7 | 71.4 | 73.7 | 74.3 | 72.5 | 73.5 | 79.3 | 83.4 | 84.7 | 84.9 | 78.3 |
| Mean monthly sunshine hours | 83.9 | 97.8 | 143.9 | 169.3 | 187.2 | 209.2 | 231.2 | 213.1 | 167.6 | 126.7 | 83.4 | 71.5 | 1,788.1 |
Source: NOAA
