= NASA research =

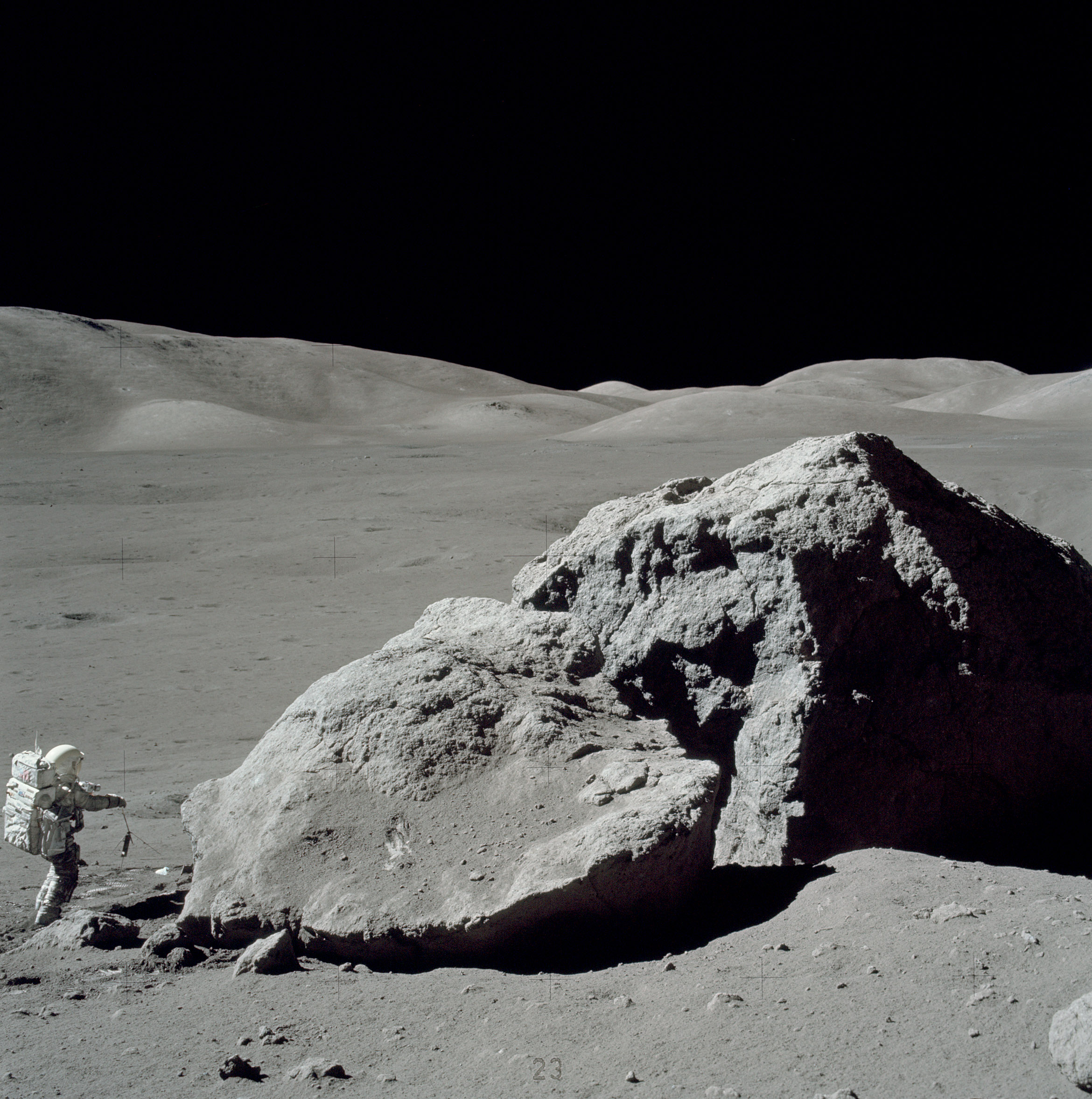
Apollo 17 astronaut Harrison Schmitt standing next to a boulder at Taurus-Littrow.

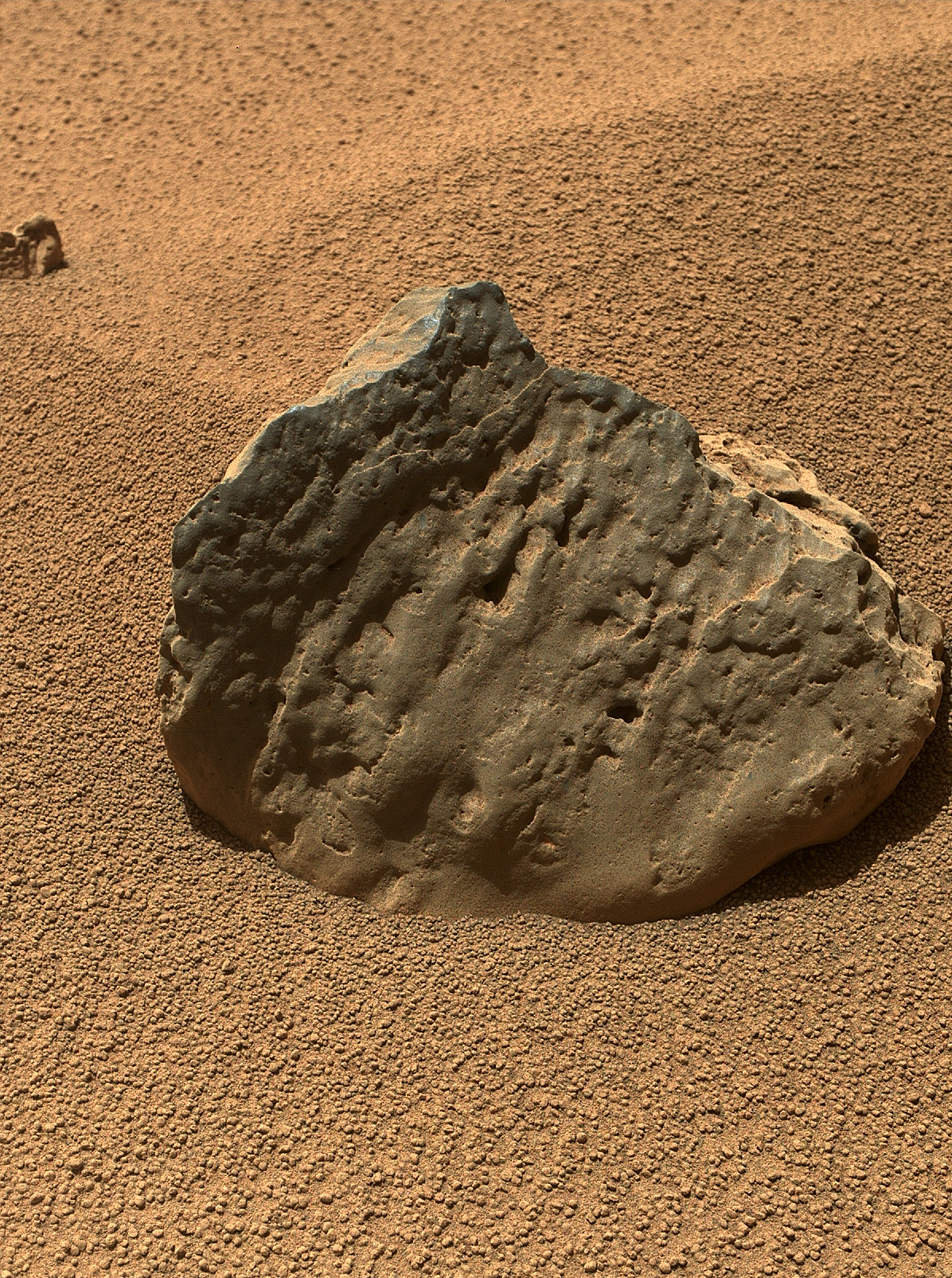
A Mars rock, viewed by the nuclear-powered Mars rover Curiosity in 2012

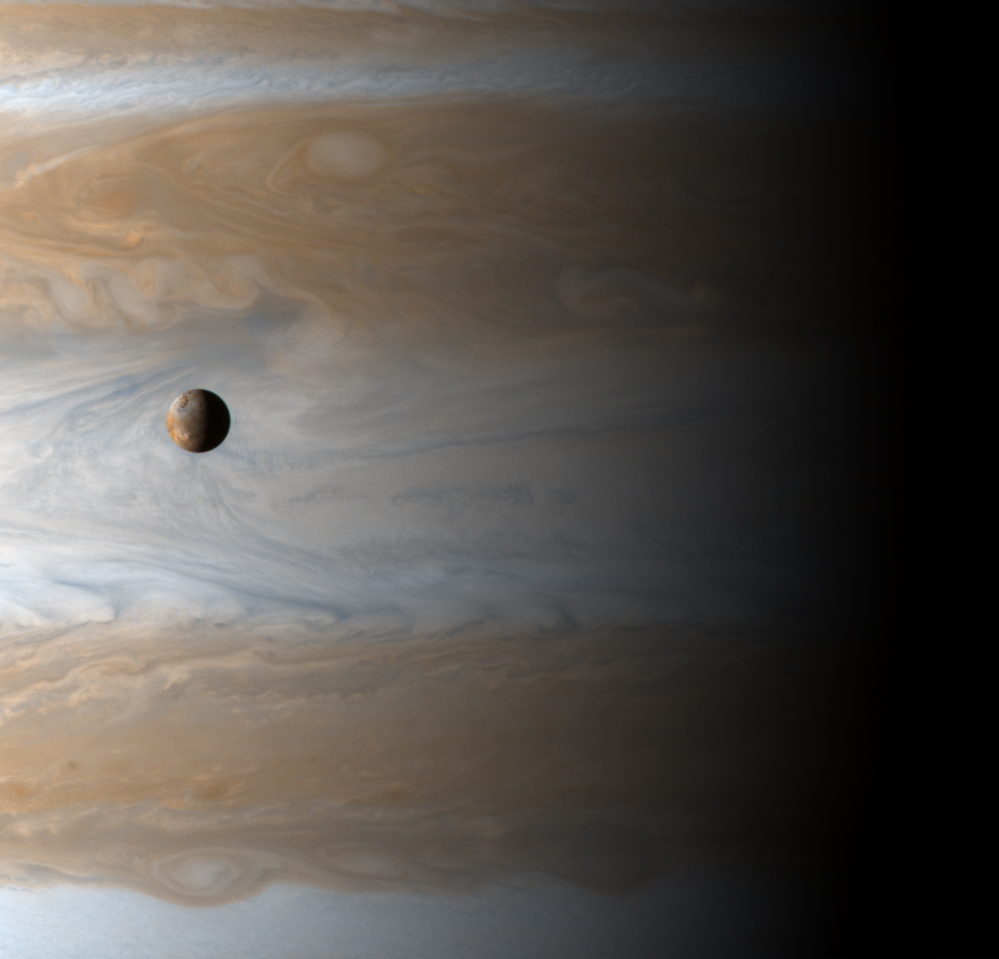
The Cassini-Huygens mission's view of Jupiter and its moon Io on January 1, 2001

Since its establishment in 1958, NASA has conducted research on a range of topics. Because of its unique structure, work happens at various field centers and different research areas are concentrated in those centers. Depending on the technology, hardware and expertise needed, research may be conducted across a range of centers.

== Aeronautics ==
The Aeronautics Research Mission Directorate (ARMD) is one of five mission directorates within NASA, the other four being the Exploration Systems Development Mission Directorate, the Space Operations Mission Directorate, the Science Mission Directorate, and the Space Technology Mission Directorate. The ARMD is responsible for NASA's aeronautical research, which benefits the commercial, military, and general aviation sectors. The current NASA associate administrator heading ARMD is Robert A. Pearce who has held the position since 2019.

ARMD is involved in the creation of the Next Generation Air Transportation System (NextGen).

A 2014 audit by the NASA Office of Inspector General reported that ARMD "solicits input from industry, academia, and other Federal agencies regarding research needs and...uses this information to develop its research plans", and concluded that the directorate supported "advancement of the nation's civil aeronautics research and technology objectives consistent with the National Plan" established in 2006.

ARMD performs its aeronautics research at four NASA facilities: Ames Research Center and Armstrong Flight Research Center in California, Glenn Research Center in Ohio, and Langley Research Center in Virginia.

== Medicine in space ==
A variety of large-scale medical studies are being conducted in space by the National Space Biomedical Research Institute (NSBRI). Prominent among these is the Advanced Diagnostic Ultrasound in Microgravity Study, in which astronauts (including former ISS Commanders Leroy Chiao and Gennady Padalka) perform ultrasound scans under the guidance of remote experts to diagnose and potentially treat hundreds of medical conditions in space. Usually there is no physician on board the International Space Station, and diagnosis of medical conditions is challenging. Astronauts are susceptible to a variety of health risks including decompression sickness, barotrauma, immunodeficiencies, loss of bone and muscle, orthostatic intolerance due to volume loss, sleep disturbances, and radiation injury. Ultrasound offers a unique opportunity to monitor these conditions in space. This study's techniques are now being applied to cover professional and Olympic sports injuries as well as ultrasound performed by non-expert operators in populations such as medical and high school students. It is anticipated that remote guided ultrasound will have application on Earth in emergency and rural care situations, where access to a trained physician is often rare.

== Salt evaporation and energy management ==
In one of the nation's largest restoration projects, NASA technology helps state and federal government reclaim 15,100 acres (61 km^{2}) of salt evaporation ponds in South San Francisco Bay. Satellite sensors are used by scientists to study the effect of salt evaporation on local ecology.

NASA has started Energy Efficiency and Water Conservation Program as an agency-wide program directed to prevent pollution and reduce energy and water utilization. It helps to ensure that NASA meets its federal stewardship responsibilities for the environment.

== Earth science ==
Main page: NASA Earth Science

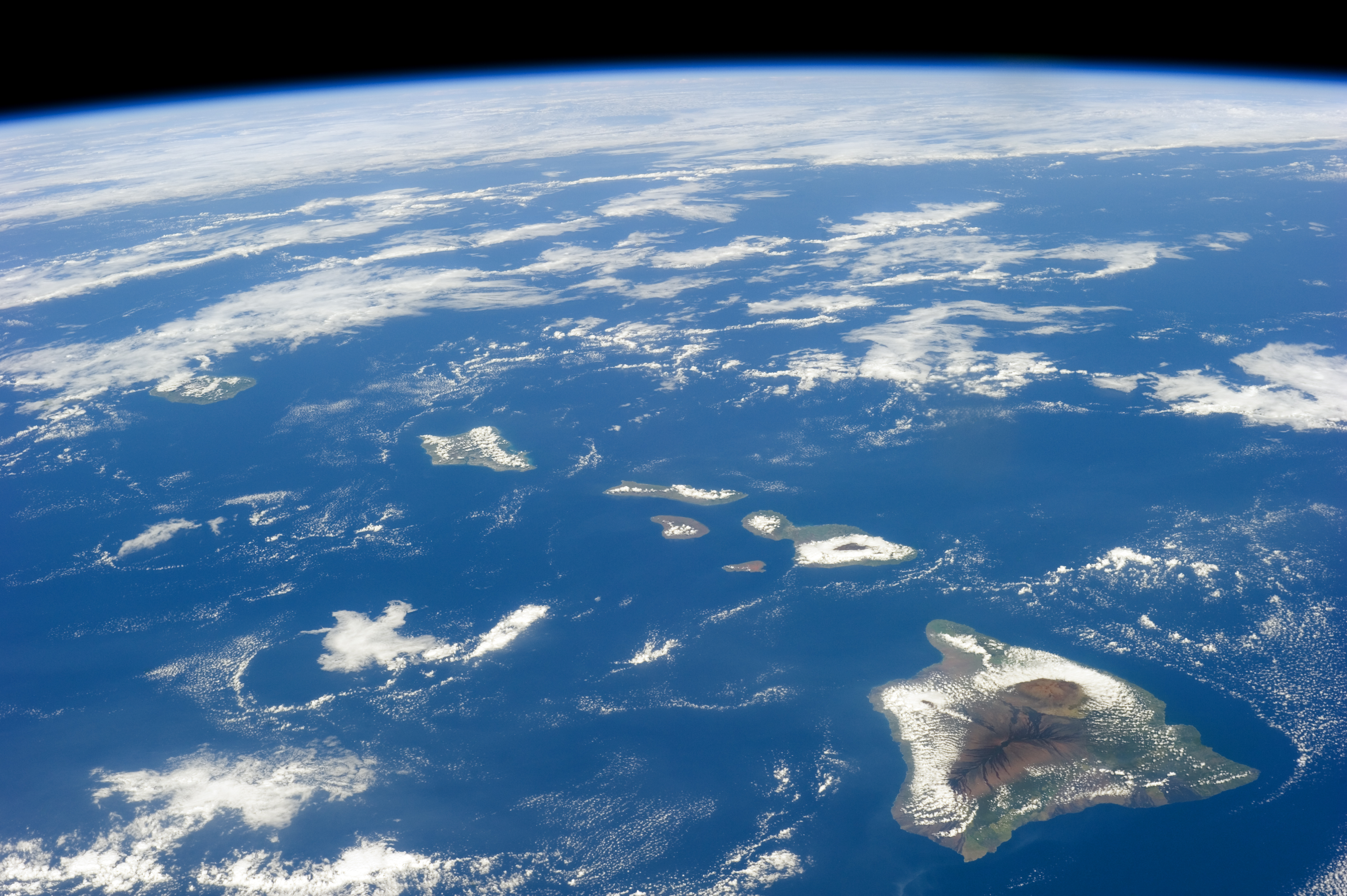
Earth from the International Space Station

Understanding of natural and human-induced changes on the global environment (such as global warming) is the main objective of NASA's Earth science. NASA currently has more than a dozen Earth science spacecraft/instruments in orbit studying all aspects of the Earth system (oceans, land, atmosphere, biosphere, cryosphere), with several more planned for launch in the next few years. The earth science research program was created and funded in the 1980s under the administrations of Ronald Reagan and George H. W. Bush.

NASA is working in cooperation with National Renewable Energy Laboratory (NREL). The goal is to produce worldwide solar resource maps with great local detail. NASA was also one of the main participants in the evaluation innovative technologies for the cleanup of the sources for dense non-aqueous phase liquids (DNAPLs). On April 6, 1999, the agency signed The Memorandum of Agreement (MOA) along with the United States Environmental Protection Agency, DOE, and USAF authorizing all the above organizations to conduct necessary tests at the John F. Kennedy Space center. The main purpose was to evaluate two innovative in-situ remediation technologies, thermal removal and oxidation destruction of DNAPLs. National Space Agency made a partnership with Military Services and Defense Contract Management Agency named the "Joint Group on Pollution Prevention". The group is working on reduction or elimination of hazardous materials or processes.

On May 8, 2003, Environmental Protection Agency recognized NASA as the first federal agency to directly use landfill gas to produce energy at one of its facilities—the Goddard Space Flight Center, Greenbelt, Maryland.

=== Ozone depletion ===
In 1975, NASA was directed by legislation to research and monitor the upper atmosphere. This led to Upper Atmosphere Research Program and later the Earth Observing System (EOS) satellites in the 1990s to monitor ozone depletion. The first comprehensive worldwide measurements were obtained in 1978 with the Nimbus 7 satellite and NASA scientists at the Goddard Institute for Space Studies.

=== Climate study ===
Within the Earth science program, NASA researches and publishes on climate issues. Its statements concur with the interpretation that the global climate is heating. Bob Walker, who has advised president-elect Donald Trump on space issues, has advocated that NASA shut down its climate study operations. The Washington Post reported that NASA scientists copied data on climate change held on U.S. government computers, out of a fear that a Trump administration would end access to data on climate change.
