= Somali Airlines Flight 40 =

1981 aviation accident in Somalia

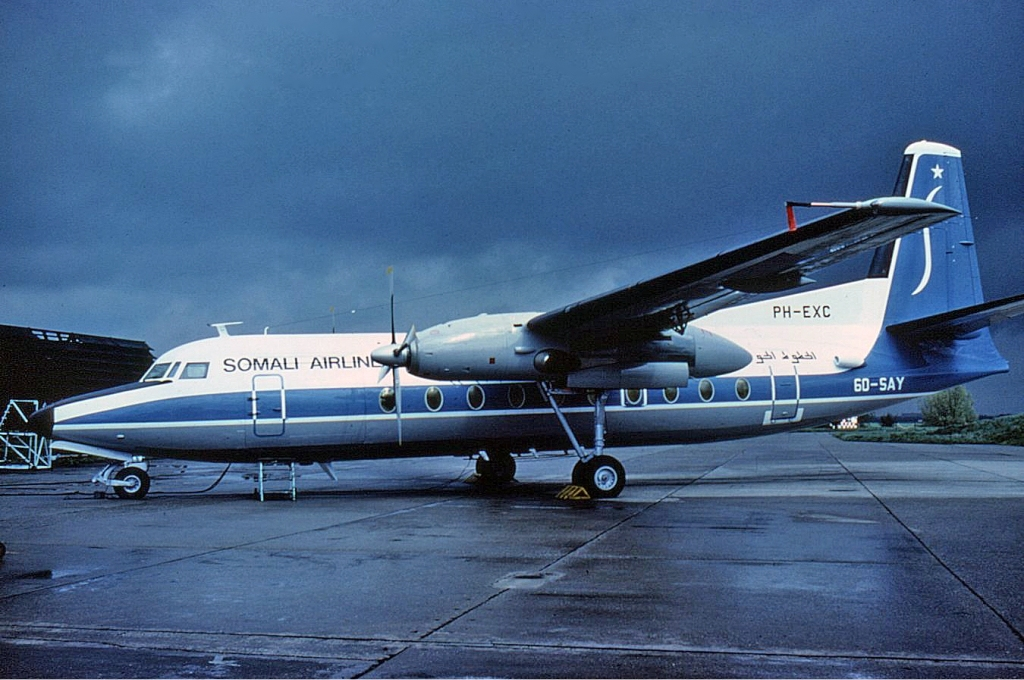
- 6O-SAY, the aircraft involved in the accident, seen in 1977

Accident
- Date: 20 July 1981
- Summary: Crashed shortly after takeoff
- Site: near Balad, Somalia; 2°21′18.0″N 45°23′34.8″E

Aircraft
- Aircraft type: Fokker F27-600 Friendship
- Operator: Somali Airlines
- IATA flight No.: HH40
- Registration: 6O-SAY
- Flight origin: Mogadishu International Airport, (Note: Now known as Aden Adde International Airport.) Mogadishu, Somalia
- Destination: Hargeisa Airport, Hargeisa, Somalia
- Occupants: 50
- Passengers: 44
- Crew: 6
- Fatalities: 50
- Survivors: 0

On 20 July 1981, Somali Airlines Flight 40, a Fokker F27-600 Friendship operating a daily scheduled domestic passenger flight from Mogadishu International Airport to Hargeisa Airport, Somalia, crashed near the town of Balad a few minutes after takeoff killing all 44 passengers and 6 crew members on board. With 50 fatalities, it remains the deadliest aviation accident in Somalia.

The flight had initially returned to Mogadishu for repairs due to an unspecified malfunction before departing again and subsequently crashing. A mass funeral attended by Somali President Siad Barre was held. Two days after the accident, Barre ordered the creation of a commission of inquiry.

According to the Aviation Safety Network, the aircraft entered a spiral dive in an area of heavy rainfall after encountering strong vertical gusts leading to the separation of its right wing. However, in 2021, Hiiraan Online contested this account, stating that besides light showers, Mogadishu rarely experiences thunderstorms in July.

== Background ==
=== Aircraft ===
The aircraft involved, manufactured on 15 June 1977, was a Fokker F27 Friendship 600RF registered as 6O-SAY. The aircraft had accumulated 6,087 flying hours in 2,777 flight cycles. It had been acquired in 1978 by flag carrier Somali Airlines, formed on 5 March 1964. By mid-1981, the airline's fleet consisted of two Boeing 720Bs, two Boeing 707s, two Douglas DC-3s, two Fokker F27s, and four Cessna aircraft. The airline also leased two Dornier Do-228-202s, both of which started flying in late October 1987. The Fokker F27s were used for domestic and regional flights.

=== Passengers and crew ===
The flight was carrying 44 passengers and 6 crew members, including 9 family members. Among the passengers were three senior armed forces officers, including General Omar Osman Diriye, a general of the Somali National Army, along with his three brothers, his wife and his four children. There were three foreigners on board the aircraft, including Arvind Kumar, an Indian businessman, and Roman Hoelldobler, a West German. Another passenger was Margaret Mary Ssebunnya, a 41-year-old exiled Ugandan who was a nurse with World Vision International.

The six crew members included Captain Abdi Mohamed Mohamed; First Officer Ali Umul; flight attendants Abshiro and Fuad; and Engineer Ali Fodade. (Note: Hiiraan Online refers to the engineer as both "Ali Fodade" and "Ali Foodade".) He had boarded the aircraft in Mogadishu after a request by the captain.

== Accident ==
On 20 July 1981, the aircraft, operating a daily scheduled domestic flight, took off from Mogadishu International Airport – on time at 6 a.m. EAT (UTC+03:00) according to passengers at Mogadishu International Airport – en route to Hargeisa Airport in Hargeisa. According to passengers at the airport, fifteen minutes after takeoff, the flight returned to Mogadishu due to an unspecified malfunction, before departing a second time following unspecified repairs. A few minutes after Flight 40 took off again, the plane crashed near the town of Balad killing all 50 people on board. It remains the deadliest aviation accident in Somalia. It was also the sixth-deadliest plane crash in 1981.

== Aftermath ==
Somali Airlines officials – who were unavailable for confirmation regarding reports of flight information – were believed to have joined rescue teams who rushed to the crash site. Authorities withheld releasing the names of the victims "pending notification of relatives". There were also fears that the fatalities may have included personnel of international aid agencies operating in Somalia. On 20 July, United Press International wrote that World Vision International's regional director for Africa, Ken Tracey, said that he had spoken by telephone to Robert Smith, World Vision International's Mogadishu representative, who had visited the scene of the accident and said that he was told that "there was absolutely no chance of recovering any parts of the victims for identification" and that "...it was just a heap of charred wreckage." While confirming that there was at least one foreign relief worker among the dead, Tracey refused to give their name, stating that "[t]here are sure to be others" and that "[p]lanes in Somalia never take off with an empty seat on them and there are always relief workers among the passengers." On 22 July, Agence France-Presse wrote that World Vision International officials stated that one of their volunteers was among the victims but declined to release their name or nationality.

Djiboutian President Hassan Gouled Aptidon, expressed his condolences to Somali President Siad Barre.

The following day, a mass funeral attended by spectators (Note: Ranging from "hundreds", according to Agence France-Presse, to "several thousand people", according to the Associated Press.) took place (Note: According to United Press International, a mass funeral was scheduled to take place at the scene of the crash.; According to Agence France-Presse, the funeral took place in Mogadishu.; According to World Vision International, the funeral took place at the scene of the crash.) with all 50 passengers and crew buried with military honours. Among the attendees were Siad Barre, United Nations High Commissioner for Refugees Poul Hartling, top government and military officials, members of the ruling revolutionary council, representatives of all the armed services, and staff of World Vision Mogadishu. By 22 July, according to Agence France-Presse, only one of the foreigners, Arvind Kumar, had been fully identified. According to the Associated Press, the body of Roman Hoelldobler was being kept for his family.

As a result of the loss of the aircraft, Somalia's sole scheduled domestic air service was flown by Somali Airlines' remaining Fokker F27, registered as 6O-SAZ. In his memoir of his experiences in Somalia titled Safirka: An American Envoy, Peter Scott Bridges, who at the time was the United States Ambassador to Somalia, wrote that he issued orders that no Americans fly on the aircraft upon learning that the plane was in "bad repair". Eight years after the accident, on 28 June 1989, 10 minutes after taking off from Hargeisa on route to Mogadishu, the Fokker F27 crashed near Hargeisa at around 9:30 a.m., killing all 23 passengers and 7 crew members. The aircraft was suspected to have been shot down by the Somali National Movement – who were fighting against the government in the northern part of Somalia – using surface-to-air missiles.

In 1991, amidst political unrest in Somalia, an ongoing civil war along with cross-border incursions from Ethiopia, Somali Airlines, whose fleet then consisted of one Dornier Do-228-202 and one Airbus A310-304, ceased operations.

== Investigation ==
Two days after the crash, Siad Barre ordered that a commission of inquiry be created. Preliminary investigations suggested that a technical fault caused the crash. According to Associated Press, the aircraft crashed after it caught fire in flight while attempting to return to Mogadishu after it had developed technical problems. In 1982, it was reported that no cause for the crash was given.

In 2021, according to Hiiraan Online, sources familiar with the accident said that the aircraft's attitude indicator (AI), a flight instrument which guides the pilot by providing information on the aircraft's pitch and bank angles relative to Earth's horizon, was faulty. However, Hiiraan Online stated that there was no correlation between the fault and the accident because, even if the aircraft's power fails, it can still function as it has standby AIs.

According to Hiiraan Online, aviation experts said that an engineer, Ali Foodade, was not needed as no maintenance takes place while the aircraft is in the air. Additionally, an engineer, Ahmed Osman, was already in Hargeisa waiting for the arrival of the flight. Speaking to Hiiraan Online, Ahmed Osman stated that "[he] was deeply shocked when [he] heard the aircraft had crashed." He also added that there was operationally no need for Ali Foodade to board the aircraft in Mogadishu.

The only scheduled domestic air service in Somalia was provided by Somali Airlines' one remaining twin-engine Fokker F-27. I learned that this plane was in bad repair, and eventually I issued orders that no American was to fly on it. There had been a second F-27. Some months before my arrival, it was barely functioning, and one day its pilot refused to take it north from Mogadishu on a scheduled flight. He was told to take off or go to jail. He took off, and a few minutes later it crashed and killed all on board.

— Peter S. Bridges on Somali Airlines' Fokker F27s.

According to the Aviation Safety Network (ASN), eight minutes after taking off from Mogadishu, the aircraft entered a spiral dive after encountering strong vertical gusts. During the dive, loads increased to approximately 5.76 g, exceeding the design stress limits of the Fokker F27, which caused its right wing to separate. Airdisaster.com wrote that the flight crew were believed to have erred in taking off during known thunderstorm conditions. According to Antonio Bordoni in his 1997 book Airlife's Register of Aircraft Accidents, the aircraft crashed after encountering turbulence that "exceeded [the] design stress limits of [the] aircraft".

However, Hiiraan Online wrote that other accounts noted that "the pilot may have become disoriented and could not recover from an unusual attitude". Additionally, Hiiraan Online stated that ASN's reasoning was contestable "on account of the weather in Mogadishu in July. There are hardly any thunderstorms in Mogadishu in July, save for light showers. The sky is relatively clear; thus, the pilot's thought of facing a storm is not feasible."

Peter Scott Bridges wrote in 2000 that the aircraft was "barely functioning" and that the pilot had refused to fly the aircraft until he was told to either take off or go to jail.

== See also ==
- Braniff International Airways Flight 250, crashed following an in-flight breakup due to extreme turbulence
- West Air Sweden Flight 294, crashed following a loss of control due to an instrument failure followed by an improper reaction and spatial disorientation
