= NYCAviation =

Aviation enthusiast and plane spotting community

NYCAviation.com
- Website type: Plane spotting resources, aviation industry news, discussion community
- Available in: English
- Owner: NYCAviation LLC
- Creators: Phil Derner Jr., founder and Matt Molnar, editor in chief
- Revenue: Advertising and retail
- Website: www.nycaviation.com
- Launched: August 31, 2003; 23 years ago
- Current status: Online

NYCAviation.com is an aviation enthusiast and plane spotting community and resource website, founded by Phil Derner Jr. on August 31, 2003. It sprung from an email newsletter started by Derner in July 2002 called Aireola Aviation, sent to a group of local friends to give them a heads-up on upcoming unique aircraft visitors and happenings from the previous week. Just over a year after the newsletter was launched, Derner transitioned the operation to a static website format.

Though the website was founded and is based in New York City, it now serves airports and enthusiasts far beyond the New York City limits. NYCAviation's (often referred to colloquially as "NYCA") message boards allow its members to discuss their love of flying machines and to share their experiences and photography from airport visits around the globe.

== History ==
=== Format ===
==== 2004 redesign ====
On July 6, 2004, the site experienced its first redesign where it took on a more organized look that included a listing of news and plane spotting guides for New York-area airports.

==== 2009 redesign ====
The site's growth brought about their second redesign, which debuted on June 26, 2009. It now features expansive news pages, regular articles and plane spotting guides serving airports far beyond the New York City limits. Derner recruited Matt Molnar as the site's Editor, leading the redesign's construction and managing through the site's news content. Recent popularity has been gained for the site through its "On This Day In Aviation" daily postings, and by keeping its followers in-the-know with regular updates on Twitter and Facebook.

==== 2012 redesign ====
The site's third redesign launched on February 20, 2012. With a more modern look, it expanded on growing article categories for visibility, incorporated a blog for the two site owners, added a Job Listings feature and made deeper parts of the site more accessible and faster loading. The announcement also hinted at more features in the future which have not been announced at this time.

==== 2013 staff changes ====
In late January 2013, NYCAviation's Editor-in-Chief Matt Molnar, died at the age of 33, creating both personal and professional challenges among the small, close-knit team. Matt's loss led to a dramatic downturn in published content over the coming months, also impacted by the resignation of Jeremy, their Project Manager. This led to operational restructuring by Founder Phil Derner in expanding the team to 9, including new positions in the form of a team of Editors, a Producer, Event Planner, Project Manager, Marketing Strategist and the hiring of a publicist, all in preparation of adding several new features and services to the business in 2014.

== Features ==
=== Spotting guides ===
NYCAviation spotting guides offer enthusiasts many resources for practicing their hobby at airports around the world. On average, a new airport guide is added about once per week, and each contains four tabbed pages that are complete with airfield statistics, radio frequencies, approach plates, and spotting maps. The spotting map pages show various locations for aviation photography throughout the airport, and also share a detailed description of directions to the various locations, photo tips and photo examples.

=== Airline news ===
Coverage includes news pertaining to the airline industry, event coverage, and a look back at aviation's past, often with a humorous twist. A news calendar on the site also informs people of coming and past dates of changes in airline routes or aircraft types and upcoming events.

The site has broken a number of stories that would later be picked up by major news organizations and grow into international headlines, including the news of the treasured Concorde aircraft's damage in Brooklyn, and the unlikely closure of a runway at JFK International Airport due to an invasion of diamondback terrapin turtles.

== Community ==
=== Forums ===
NYCAviation's message boards allow its members to share plane spotting tips and photographs, discuss aviation industry news and events, and broader topics such as politics and humor.

=== Members ===
Through their extensive internet interactions, NYCAviation members have created an offline community as well. It is common for members to arrange plane spotting outings, special aircraft arrival gatherings and seasonal events. The recent addition of active Twitter and Facebook presences has also helped the community grow.

== Security and First Amendment issues ==
The NYCA community is at the forefront of the debate between the requirements of counterterrorism efforts and the First Amendment rights of plane spotters in the wake of the September 11 attacks. The Spotter Blotter section of the site's message board encourages plane spotters to share their experiences with law enforcement, good and bad, when they are approached or questioned in the course of enjoying their hobby.

== Media ==
Aviation news publisher Flightglobal's annual Webbie Awards awarded NYCAviation "Best Enthusiast Site of 2009" and ranked the site 3rd in "Best Use of Social Media for 2009", losing out only to Lockheed Martin and Manchester Airport It was the first year NYCAviation was nominated for the awards, both of which were in new awards categories.

NYCAviation was featured in a segment about plane spotting with Al Roker and Ann Curry on NBC's Today.

NYCAviation is cited as an authority on the hobby of plane spotting in the HarperCollins title Get A Hobby! (2007).

NYCAviation and the growing plane spotting community that it has helped foster have been profiled by The New York Times and The New Yorker.

== Concorde ==
In July 2008, a treasured British Airways Concorde, on display at Floyd Bennett Field in Brooklyn during the restoration of its permanent home at the Intrepid Sea-Air-Space Museum, was damaged by a passing delivery truck. Photos appeared on NYCAviation.com within hours, and the site received recognition from local, national and international media, covering the aircraft's damage and repair. Volunteers from NYCA arranged to anonymously inspect the state of the aircraft regularly until its return to the old aircraft carrier, reporting back their findings to the Intrepid organization.
