= Balad, Somalia =

Balcad
- Town
- Location in Somalia
- Coordinates: 2°21′30″N 45°23′11″E
- Country: Somalia
- State: Hirshabelle
- Region: Middle Shabelle
- District: Balcad
- Time zone: UTC+3 (EAT)

Bal'ad District (Somali: Degmada Balcad) is one of the districts of Middle Shabelle region of Somalia. It is located about 36 kilometers northeast of the capital city of Mogadishu. Emperor Menelik II attempted to conquer the area in 1905, and the area faced attacks and occupation by Al-Shabaab in the 2010s and 2020s.

== History ==
During the spring of 1905, in the last years of Menelik II's expansions, a force of several thousand Ethiopian horseman armed with rifles pushed into the Shabelle valley near Balad. Only a day's march from Mogadishu, several clans residing in the region rose up to engage in battles with the invading forces and defeated them.

On July 20, 1981, Somali Airlines Flight 40 crashed near the town, killing all 50 people aboard.

In December 2021, Balad town was attacked by Al Shabaab fighters. At least eight people were killed in the fighting. On 9 June, 2022, Al-Shabaab claimed responsibility for a landmine explosion targeting the Danab Brigade early in the morning on the outskirts of the town, which they claim killed at least 15 soldiers and destroyed one vehicle.

=== Al-Shabaab insurgency 2022-present ===
On 27 February 2025, al-Shabaab militants briefly captured Balad after storming a military base located near the town, but after some clashes the settlement was recaptured by the Somali National Army. Though the town ended up in the control of Al-Shabaab by 28 February 2025.

=== Battle of Bal'ad ===
On 5 March 2025, Al-Shabaab used the town as a central hub to continue its insurgency towards capital Mogadishu.

== Infrastructure ==
From 1974 to 1978, 160 million Somali shillings were spent on irrigation development in Bal'ad.

== Economy ==
In the 1970s the town relied on the cotton textile industry and cotton growing.

== See also ==
- Somali Civil War (2009–present)

== Works cited ==
- Bohra, D. (1979). "Patterns of URban Settlements in Somalia". GeoJournal. 3 (1). Springer Nature: 63–68. doi:10.2307/41142187. JSTOR 41142187.
- Samatar, A. (1988). "The State, Agrarian Change and Crisis of Hegemony in Somalia". Review of African Political Economy. 43. Taylor & Francis: 26–41. doi:10.2307/4005755. JSTOR 4005755.
- Map of Balcad at OpenStreetMap
- OCHA map of Balcad at ReliefWeb
- Atlas of the Juba and Shabelle Rivers in Somalia: Balcad at SWALIM
