= Harmon Trophy =

Set of aviation awards

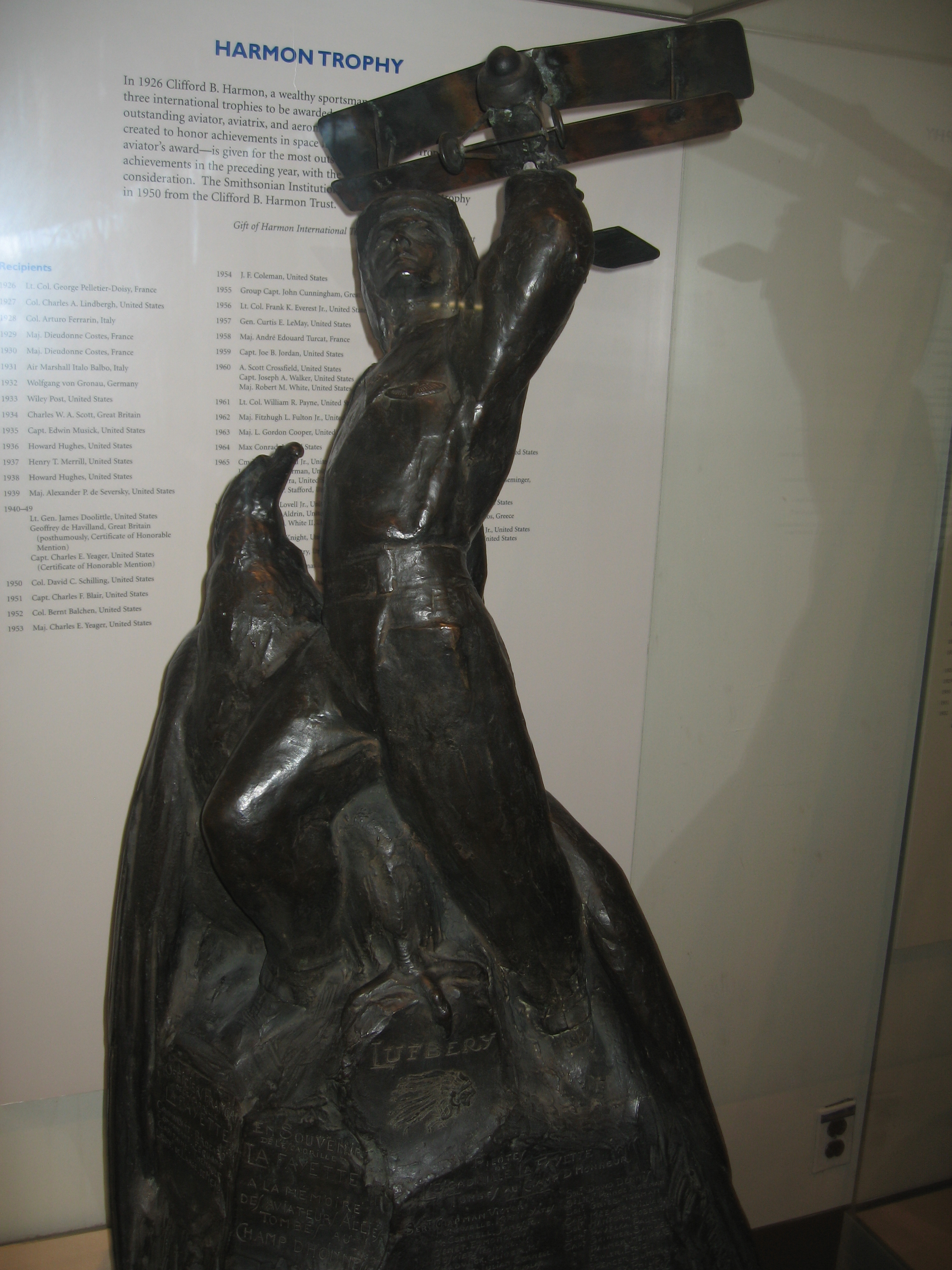
The Harmon Aviator Trophy

The Harmon Trophy is a set of three international trophies, to be awarded annually to the world's outstanding aviator, aviatrix, and aeronaut (balloon or dirigible). A fourth trophy, the "National Trophy", was awarded from 1926 through 1938 to the most outstanding aviator in each of the twenty-one member countries and again from 1946–1948 to honor Americans who contributed to aviation. The award was established in 1926 by Clifford B. Harmon, a wealthy balloonist and aviator.

The awards are described by the Clifford B. Harmon Trust as:

American awards for the most outstanding international achievements in the arts and/or science of aeronautics for the preceding year, with the art of flying receiving first consideration.

== World War II and Harmon's death ==
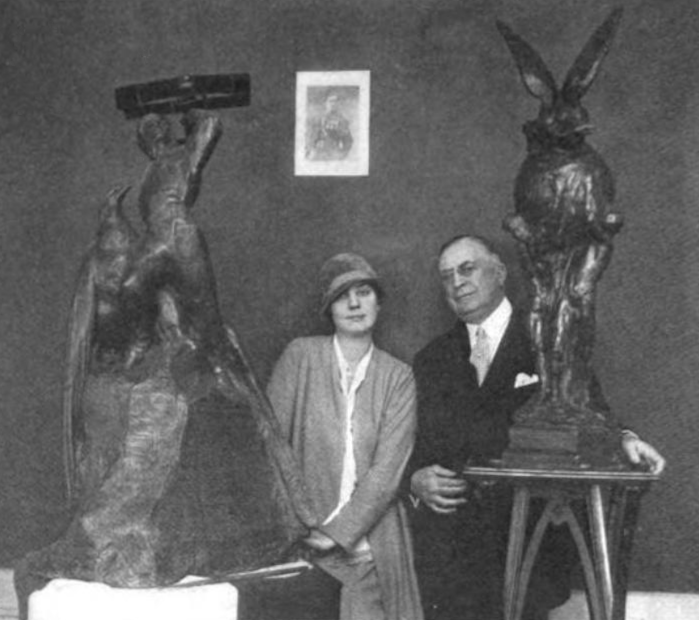
Roussadana Mdivani and Clifford B. Harmon with the Harmon Trophy (left) and Lafayette Escadrille Trophy (right)

Prior to World War II, the award was administered by the International League of Aviators (Ligue Internationale des Aviateurs), an organization founded by Harmon to serve as "an agent for Peace and National security." The League became defunct during the war and Harmon's death on June 25, 1945 in Cannes, France put the awards in turmoil. Harmon left $55,000 of his estate to continue funding the award in "perpetuity," but Harmon's relatives challenged the bequest. Ultimately, a trust fund of $48,431 was created in 1948.

During the period the awards were in litigation (1945–1948), the American Section of the League awarded the International Aviator Trophy to three U.S. leaders in aviation. However, since the awards were not approved by other League Sections, the awards are technically invalid. Also, these three awards were given without consideration to the "art of flying" and the awards did not recognize a superlative aviation achievement, rather recognized American aviation industry leaders. President Truman's staff questioned the award to Alexander de Seversky, Secretary of the Air Force Stuart Symington stating, "he [de Seversky] did absolutely nothing to deserve it." Truman also did not make time to present the 1948 award to Trans World Airlines CEO Ralph Damon or Brazilian aviation pioneer Francisco Pignatari The award to Pan American World Airways President Juan Trippe in 1946 was the only one presented without debate.

Since 1997 or 1998, the National Aeronautic Association has been responsible for awarding the trophies. With the exception of the Aeronaut trophy, all are inactive.

The trustees wrestled with how to treat space flight. Bound by the court to offer only three trophies, the trustees first agreed that "feats of piloting in both earth orbiting or outer space vehicles will be considered for the Harmon Awards provided the vehicles are controlled by their pilots rather than from the ground." The advisory committee directed the trustees to alternate awarding the aeronaut trophy between balloonists and astronauts, but the trustees decided to offer the aviator award to aviation and astronaut recipients. A fifth trophy was created in 1969 to honor achievements in space flight.

Some aviatrix awards from 1980–1990 were awarded by the Ninety-Nines based on research performed by Fay Gillis Wells. This work was not coordinated with the NAA or Smithsonian.

The original awards were 24-inch-tall bronze statues. The aviator trophy depicts World War I flying ace Raoul Lufbery launching a biplane set next to an eagle about to take wing. The statuette was created by sculptor Roussadana M'divani. The Smithsonian Institution acquired the aviator's trophy in 1950 from the Clifford B. Harmon Trust. The aviatrix trophy depicts a winged goddess cradling a falcon with outstretched wings. The aeronaut trophy was lost in Germany between May 1940 and October 1953 and was believed to have been sold as scrap. The three-foot-tall, 150-pound statue of five aviators holding the globe on their shoulders was found in a junk store and subsequently given to the Smithsonian after the presentation of the 1952 awards.

== List of award winners ==
The following is an incomplete list compiled from several sources. The Aeronaut, National and Astronaut categories have not been listed in a central location. The NAA and the Smithsonian Institution's National Air and Space Museum worked to assemble a complete list to be published in conjunction with the NAA's hundredth anniversary in 2005, however this project was not completed and it appears that the source documents for a period of awards were destroyed.

Year	Aviator	Aviatrix	Aeronaut	National (until 1949) see below for Astronaut since 1967
1926	Lt. Col. Georges Pelletier d'Oisy, France	No award presented	General Umberto Nobile, Italy	Shirley J. Short, USA; Cdr. Hirosi Abe, Japan; Maj. Mario de Bernardi, Italy
1927	Col. Charles A. Lindbergh, USA	Lady Mary Bailey, UK	Commander Charles E. Rosendahl, USA	Joseph le Brix, Dieudonné Costas, France; Miguel García Granados, Guatemala; Francesco de Pinedo, Italy; Sidney Webster, UK; G. A. Koppen, Nederlands; José Manuel Sarmento, Portugal; Ribeiro Barros, Brazil
1928	Col. Arturo Ferrarin, Italy	Lady Mary Bailey, UK	Dr. Hugo Eckener, Germany	Carl Eielson; Charles Kingsford Smith Australia
1929	Lieut. Carl Ben Eielson, USA	Miss Winifred Spooner, UK	Dr. Hugo Eckener, Germany	Maj. James H. Doolittle, USA; Hugh Grosvenor, Australia
1930	Maj. Dieudonne Costes, France	Miss Amy Johnson Mollison, UK	Dr. Hugo Eckener, Germany (dirigible); Ward T. Van Orman, USA (spherical balloon)	Maj. Ramón Franco, Spain; Charles Kingsford-Smith, Australia
1931	Air Marshal Italo Balbo, Italy	Mrs. Maryse Bastié, France	Dr. Hugo Eckener, Germany (dirigible); Prof. Auguste Piccard, Switzerland (spherical balloon)	Clyde Pangborn, USA; Hugh Herndon, USA; Ruth Nichols, USA; Air Commodore; Charles Kingsford Smith Australia; Bert Hinkler, UK; Amy Johnson, UK; Peggy Salaman, UK; Flugkapitän von Gronau, Germany; Marga von Etzdorf, Germany
1932	Wolfgang von Gronau; Germany	Mrs. Amelia Earhart Putnam, USA	Prof. Auguste Piccard, Switzerland (spherical balloon); Capt. Ernst A. Lehmann, (dirigible)	Roscoe Turner, USA; Warren D. Williams, USA (dirigible); Lt. Cdr. Charles E. C. Rosendahl, USA (dirigible); Lt. Thomas G. W. Settle, USA (spherical balloon); Lt.Carlos de Haya González, Spain
1933	Wiley Post, USA	Maryse Hiltz, France	Lt. Cdr. Thomas G. W. Settle, USA (Spherical Balloon); Dr. Hugo Eckener, Germany (dirigible)	Mrs. Anne Morrow Lindbergh, USA; Lt. Cdr. Charles E. C. Rosendahl, USA (dirigible); Lt. Cdr. Thomas W. G. Settle, USA (spherical balloon); Francesco Agello, Italy; Mariano Barberan, Spain (posthumously); Herberts Cukurs, Latvia; Joaquin Collar, Spain (posthumously); Iwan W. Smirnoff, Netherlands
1934	C. W. A. Scott; UK	Hélène Boucher, France (posthumously)	Capt. Ernst A. Lehmann, Germany (dirigible); Mme. Jeannette Piccard, Switzerland (United States) (spherical balloon)	Miss Laura Ingalls, USA; Dean C. Smith, USA; Lt. Cdr. H. V. Wiley, USA (dirigible); Maj. William E. Kepner, USA (spherical balloon); Edgardo Bonnet, Argentina; Maria Leloir de Udaondo, Argentina, Charles Kingsford-Smith, Australia, Teddy Franchomme, Belgium; E. Demuyter, Belgium, Mlle. S. Lippens, Belgium; Michael Hansen, Denmark; U. Makela, Finland; Jean Mermoz, France; Raymond Delmotte, France; Germain Bonnet, France; Heini Dittmar, Germany; Hans Kurt Fleming, Germany; Elly Beinhorn, Germany; K. D. Parmentier, Holland; Francesco Agello, Italy; Momosaburo Shinno, Japan; Choko Mabuchi, Japan; Kikuko Matsumoto, Japan; Capt. Jerzy Bajan, Poland; Franciszek Hynek, Poland; Humberto da Cruz, Portugal; Herman Baron, San Salvador; Luang Prung Prechakas, Siam; Ramon Torres, Spain; Walther Mittelholzer, Switzerland
1935	Capt. Edwin Musick, USA	Jean Batten, UK (New Zealand); Amelia Earhart, USA	Capt.Orvil Arson Anderson, USA; Capt.Albert William Stevens USA;(spherical balloon); Capt. Hans von Schiller, Germany (dirigible)	Arnold Looz-Corswarem, Belgium; Michael Hansen, Denmark; Harry Frank Broadbent, UK (Australia); André Japy, France; Bertha Alisch, Germany; Elly Beinhorn, Germany; Mario Stoppani, Italy; Casimiro Babbi, Italy; Marchesa Carina Negrone, Italy; Hoja Dzenitis, Lithuania; Gomez Namorado, Portugal; Juan Ignacio Pombo, Spain
1936	Howard Hughes, USA	Jean Batten, UK (New Zealand)	Capt. Ernst A. Lehmann, Germany; Ernest De Muyter, Belgium	Mrs. Louise Thaden, USA; James Diamond, USA; Carl Götze Jr., Germany; Harry Frank Broadbent, UK (Australia)
1937	Henry T. Merrill, USA	Jean Batten, UK (New Zealand)	No award presented	Miss Jacqueline Cochran, USA; Howard Hughes, USA
1938	Howard Hughes, USA;	Jacqueline Cochran, USA	No award presented	Lt. Col. Robert Olds, USA (Diploma of Honor); Roscoe Turner, USA; Capt. Kellett and crew, UK; Michael Hansen, Denmark; Maurice Rossi, France; Elizabeth Lion, France; Capt. Alfred Henks, Germany; Hanna Reitsch, Germany; Lt. Col. Mario Pezzi, Italy; Maj. Yuzo Fujita, Japan; Capt. Viktors Eglitis, Latvia; Victor Alfredo Lara, San Salvador; Maj. Tonnard, Belgium (spherical balloon); Capt. Max Pruss, Germany (dirigible); Capt. Antoni Janusz, Poland (spherical balloon)
1939	Maj. Alexander P. de Seversky, USA	Jacqueline Cochran, USA	No award presented	
1945				Francisco Pignatari, Brazil
1946				Juan T. Trippe, USA
1947				Alexander P. de Seversky, USA
1948				Ralph S. Damon
1949				Louis A. Johnson
1940 to 1949	Lt. Gen. James H. Doolittle, USA; Geoffrey de Havilland, UK (posthumously) (Citation of Honorable Mention); Capt. Charles E. Yeager, USA (Citation of Honorable Mention)	Jacqueline Cochran, USA; Pauline Gower, UK (posthumously) (Citation of Honorable Mention)	Vice Admiral Charles E. Rosendahl, USA; M. Charles Dollfus, France (Citation of Honorable Mention); Lt. Howard R. Walton, USA (posthumously) (Citation of Honorable Mention)	
1950	Col. David C. Schilling, USA	No award presented		National prize not awarded after 1949
1951	Capt. Charles F. Blair Jr, USA	Jacqueline Auriol, France	Lt. Carl J. Seiberlich, USN	
1952	Col. Bernt Balchen, USA (Norwegian-born)	Jacqueline Auriol, France	Walter L. Massic, USA	
1953	Maj. Charles E. Yeager, USA	Jacqueline Cochran, USA	No award presented	
1954	Major Charles E. Yeager, USA	Jacqueline Cochran, USA		
1955	Group Captain John Cunningham, UK	Jacqueline Auriol, France	Lt. Cdr. Charles A. Mills, USA	
1956	Lt. Col. Frank K. Everest Jr., USA	Jacqueline Auriol, France	Lt. Cdr. Malcolm D. Ross, USA; Lt. Cdr. Morton L. Lewis, USA	
1957	Gen. Curtis E. LeMay, USA	No award presented	Cdr. Jack R. Hunt, USA	
1958	Maj. André Edouard Turcat, France	No award presented		
1959	Capt. Joe B. Jordan, USA	No award presented	Capt. Joseph Kittinger, USA	
1960	A. Scott Crossfield, USA; Capt. Joseph A. Walker, USA; Maj. Robert M. White, USA	No award presented		
1961	Lt. Col. William R. Payne, USA	Jacqueline Cochran, USA	Cdr. Malcolm D. Ross, USA; Lt. Cdr. Victor E. Prather, USA (posthumously)	
1962	Maj. Fitzhugh L. Fulton Jr., USA	No award presented	Mrs. Nini Boesman, Netherlands (subsequently canceled)	
1963	Maj. L. Gordon Cooper, USA	Betty Miller, USA	No award presented	
1964	Max Conrad, USA	Joan Merriam Smith, USA (posthumously)	No award presented	
1965	Commander James A. Lovell Jr.; Lt. Col. Frank Borman; Captain Wally Schirra; Maj. Thomas P. Stafford (all USA)	No award presented		
1966	Cmdr. James A. Lovell Jr.; Maj. Edwin E. Aldrin; Maj. Alvin S. White (all USA)	Sheila Scott, UK	No award presented	
1967	Major William J. Knight, USA	No award presented		Astronaut
1968	Maj. Jerauld R. Gentry, USA	No award presented		Col. Frank Borman; Capt. James A. Lovell Jr.; Lt. Col. William A. Anders (all USA)
1969	Squadron Leader Thomas Lecky-Thompson, UK; Squadron Leader Graham Williams, UK	Turi Widerøe; Norway	No award presented	Neil Armstrong; Edwin E. Aldrin; Michael Collins
1970	Brian Trubshaw, UK; Major André Edouard Turcat, France	Sheila Scott, UK	No award presented	
1971	Lt. Col. Thomas B. Estes, USA; Lt. Col. Dewain C. Vick, USA	Geraldyn Cobb, USA	No award presented	
1972	Lt. Col. Edgar L. Allison, USA	No award presented	No award presented	
1973	Col. Edward J. Nash, USA	No award presented	Malcolm S. Forbes Sr., USA	Captain Charles Conrad Jr.; Captain Paul J. Weitz; Captain Joseph Kerwin (all USA)
1974				
1975	Lt. Col. Herbert M. Fix, USA	Marion Rice Hart, USA		
1976	No award presented			
1977	No award presented			
1978	No award presented			
1979	Byran Allen, USA	No award presented		
1980	Lt. (jg) John Currier, USCG	No award presented		
1981	Jerry Foster, USA	Janice Lee Brown, USA		John W. Young; Capt. Robert L. Crippen, Col. Joseph H. Engle; Capt. Richard Truly (all USA)
1982	Dormon Cannon, USA;	No award presented		
1983	No award presented	Dr. Sally Ride, USA		
1984	Senator Barry Goldwater	Brooke Knapp, USA		
1985	No award presented	No award presented		
1986	Chief Warrant Officer Jon Iseminger, USA	Jeana Yeager, USA		
1987	Allen E. Paulson, USA	Lois McCallin, USA		
1988	Kanellos Kanellopoulos; Greece	Anne Baddour, USA	Per Lindstrand	
1989	Capt. George A. Hof Jr., USA; Dr. Max E. Shauck, USA	Gaby Kennard, Australia		
1990	No award presented	No award presented		Vladimir Titov and Musa Manarov, both Russia
1991	No award presented	No award presented		
1992	No award presented	No award presented		
1993		No award presented		Vance D. Brand, USA
1994	No award presented	No award presented		
1995	No award presented	Eileen M. Collins, USA		

National Aeronautic Association.

Year	Aviator	Aviatrix	Aeronaut
1998			Steve Fossett
1999	Don Cameron		Dr. Bertrand Piccard; Switzerland; Brian Jones, UK
2000			David Hempleman-Adams
2001		Jennifer Murray, UK (USA)	Richard Abruzzo
2002			Steve Fossett
2003			Richard Abruzzo
2004			David Hempleman-Adams
2005			Carol Rymer Davis and Richard Abruzzo
2006			No award
2007			David Hempleman-Adams
2008			No award
2009			No award
2010			No award
2011			John Petrehn
2012			No award
2013			No award
2014			No award
2015			Troy Bradley and Leonid Tiukhtyaev
2016			No award
2017			No award
2018			Nicolas Tièche and Laurent Sciboz (Fribourg Freiburg Challenge Team)

== See also ==
- List of aviation awards
