= David Levin (balloonist) =

American balloonist

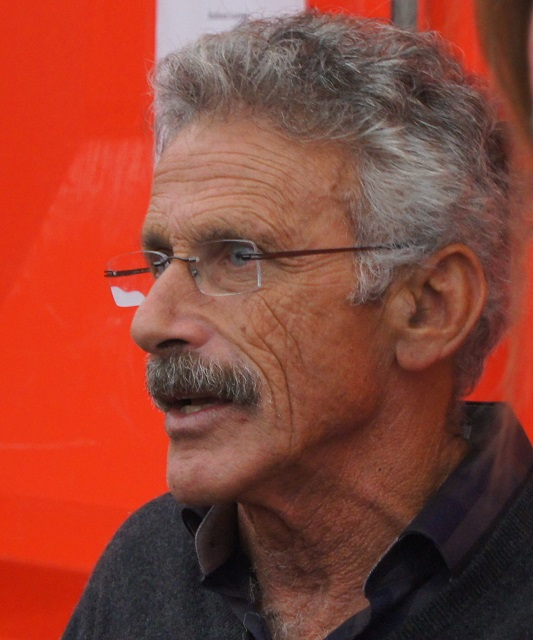
- Levin in September 2015
- Born: June 10, 1948; Newark, New Jersey, U.S.
- Died: May 13, 2017 (aged 68); Boulder, Colorado, U.S.
- Education: Boston University
- Occupations: Balloonist, businessman
- Known for: only "triple crown" pilot in ballooning
- Spouse: Roberta Siegel
- Children: 2
Medal record
Hot air ballooning
Representing the United States
World Championship
Gold medal – first place	1985 Battle Creek	Overall
Bronze medal – third place	1995 Battle Creek	Overall

David N. Levin (June 10, 1948 – May 13, 2017) was an American balloonist. He is the only balloonist to have completed the "triple crown" by winning the World Gas Balloon Championship, the World Hot Air Ballooning Championships and the Gordon Bennett Cup. In 1992, Levin also became the first balloonist to win ballooning's four major events, having won the U.S. National Hot Air Balloon Championship along with the "triple crown".

== Ballooning ==
In 1975, Levin made his first hot air balloon flight in a homemade balloon in Connecticut. The following year, Levin and a childhood friend, Link Z. Baum, already an experienced balloonist, decided to move to Colorado and open America's first hot air ballooning resort, the Balloon Ranch. Since then he has participated in numerous competitions and many World Championships. He became pilot of hot air balloons as well as of gas balloons. Since 2002 he participated in further competitions as a steward or hosted them as (Deputy) Event Director. One of his last activities had been his function as Deputy Event Director of the 3rd Fédération Aéronautique Internationale (FAI) Women's European Hot Air Balloon Championship in September 2015.

In 1985, Levin got his "first crown" by winning the FAI World Hot Air Balloon Championship in Battle Creek, Michigan. Ten years later he became bronze medalist at the same place. In 1992, Levin won the FAI World Gas Balloon Championship in Obertraun (Austria) with Jim Schiller. With Mark Sullivan he got the silver and the bronze medals in 1996 and 2004, after winning bronze with Jacques Soukup in 1988.

The aim of the Gordon Bennett Cup is "to fly the furthest distance from the launch site." With James Herschend Levin launched the balloon D-Aspen from Stuttgart, (Germany) on September 19, 1992, travelling 964.19 kilometres (599.12 mi), and landing near Przemyśl, Poland 45:36 hours later. Sixty years after the last first U.S. victory they had won the 36th edition of this ballooning competition and Levin added the third "crown" to his record. Twelve years later they had been succeeded by the American team Richard Abruzzo and Carol Rymer Davis, who disappeared in the 2010 competition.

In 1987, 1988 and 1993 Levin won the U.S. Championships in gas ballooning and in 1996 and 2000 the America's Challenge Gas Balloon Race. With his brother Alan, he made a non-stop balloon flight from Albuquerque in New Mexico to the coast of Maine travelling 1,998 miles (3,215 km). Other notable flights had been the first balloon flight over Pikes Peak in 1977 (14,400 feet) and a flight to 33,425 feet (10,188 m) altitude in a standard hot air balloon.

David Levin was awarded the 1992 and 2010 Diploma Montgolfier for gas ballooning and major contribution to the sport of ballooning. He was inducted into the FAI hall of fame in 2015 and into the U.S. Ballooning Hall of Fame of the National Balloon Museum in July 2017.

== Biography ==
David Levin was born in Newark, New Jersey on June 10, 1948, and grew up in South Orange, where he attended Columbia High School. He graduated from Boston University with a bachelor's degree in Business Administration, and with a JD in Law in 1975. He earned a master's in tax law in 1976. He was a private investor living in Boulder, Colorado.

In Winter he served as teacher for adaptive skiing to people with various disabilities. He had been Board member of Ignite Adaptive Sports in Boulder and the Boulder Jewish Community Center.

Levin died from pancreatic cancer on May 13, 2017, in his home in Boulder, Colorado.

== Family ==
Levin was born in Newark, New Jersey, to Martin a real estate developer and the former Jean Berman, a homemaker. He married Roberta Siegel. They had twins, Matthew and Rebecca.

== Awards ==
- 1992 FAI Diplome Montgolfier for Gas Ballooning.
- 1996 CIA Gold Sporting Badge with three diamonds.
- 2009 BFA Shields-Trauger Award for service to the BFA.
- 2010 FAI Diplome Montgolfier for major contribution to the sport of ballooning.

== Events won ==
- 1985 World Hot Air Ballooning Championships, Battle Creek, MI USA
- 1988 Trans-Australia Bicentennial Balloon Challenge
- 1989 U.S. National Hot Air Balloon Championship, Baton Rouge
- 1990 Canadian Open Championship, St. Jean sur Richelieu
- 1992 World Gas Balloon Championship, Obertraun, Austria
- 1992 Coupe Aeronautique Gordon Bennett, Stuttgart, Germany
- 1994 BP Alpine Balloon Trophy, Zell am See, Austria
- 1996 & 2000 America's Challenge Gas Balloon Race, Albuquerque, NM
- 1987, 1989 & 1993 U.S. National Gas Balloon Championship.
