= Choko Mabuchi =

Japanese pilot

Choko Mabuchi 馬淵 テフ子
- Born: June 5, 1911
- Died: February 23, 1985 (aged 73)
- Resting place: Tama Cemetery
- Education: Seika High School
- Known for: the first female pilot to cross the Sea of Japan
- Awards: Harmon Trophy
- Aviation career
- Famous flights: good will flight to Manchukuo between 26 October and 5 November 1933 with Kiku Nishizaki
- Flight license: March 1934

Choko Mabuchi (馬淵 テフ子, Mabuchi Chōko; 5 June 1911 – 23 February 1985) is a Japanese female pilot, and a pioneer of overseas flight among female pilots along with Kiku Nishizaki. Her experience as a pioneer female pilot served as the basis for the lead character, played by Yōko Asaji, in the popular NHK Asadora TV series Kumo no jūtan in 1976.

== Dream to be an Olympian ==
Born on 5 June 1911 in Hirosaki, Aomori Prefecture, and moved between many cities when she was very young due to her father's job in the military, she entered a girls' school in Osaka. As a girl 168 cm tall and weighed 62 kg, she was a large figure as a woman during the 1920s, and she entered the Japan Women's College of Physical Education in 1931. She started working as a Physical Education teacher at Ferris Girls' School in Yokohama, and won many medals as a discus thrower, dreaming to compete in the 1932 Summer Olympics.

Mabuchi was nominated as a discus thrower at the Los Angeles Olympics, remained to the final selection but was defeated. While she was having a hard time to overcome depression, Kiyoko Nagayama, her friend from college, asked her and try out for the Asia Aviation School together in May, 1933. The school was opened that year by a pioneer pilot Kinjirō Īnuma, who expanded his business of aircraft manufacture to train pilots. Eventually, Mabuchi met Kiku Nishizaki (née Matsumoto) at the aviation school who transferred from 安藤飛行機研究所 (Andō Hikōki Kenkyusho, Ando Airplane Laboratory), and they would be chosen to fly to celebrate the new founding Manchuria.

== The flight to Manchuria ==
In March, 1934, Mabuchi was licensed second class pilot, the 13th or the 18th among female pilot. One month later in April, she flew solo to Kurotake mountain on Izu Peninsula as part of her training, and personally to pay condolence to her senior pilot Park Kyung-won. In July, Mabuchi and Kiku Nishizawa asked two other second class female pilots to found 日本女子飛行士俱樂部 (Nihon Joshi Hikoshi Kurabu) (Japan Women Aviatoers' Club).

She flew Salmson 2 to Kazuno, Akita and thanked her grandmother who supported her tuition to go to the aviation school, before departing on an overseas friendship flight bound to Manchuria. It was on 26 October 1933 when she and Kiku Nishizaki departed Tokyo to Manchuria, each of them aboard Salmson 2. Her plane was named Yellow Butterfly, after her first name Choko, while Nisizaki's was White Chrysanthemum after her first name Kiku. Mabuchi was the pilot in command with a first officer, carrying messages from the mayor of Kanagawa Prefecture, mayor of Yokohama as well as writings and paintings by elementary school pupils. It took her nine days to cross the Sea of Japan and arrive at Manchurian ja:新京 (Changchun) on 5 November, later than expected as her airplane broke down and she made an emergency landing on the way. Nizhisaki had arrived the previous day. Mabuchi returned to Japan and treated as one of the heroines to complete an international flight.

Her career as a pilot did not last long due to the onset of the Second Sino-Japanese War, and her flying plan to Germany was cancelled when female pilots were banned to fly airplanes in 1937.

== As an educator ==
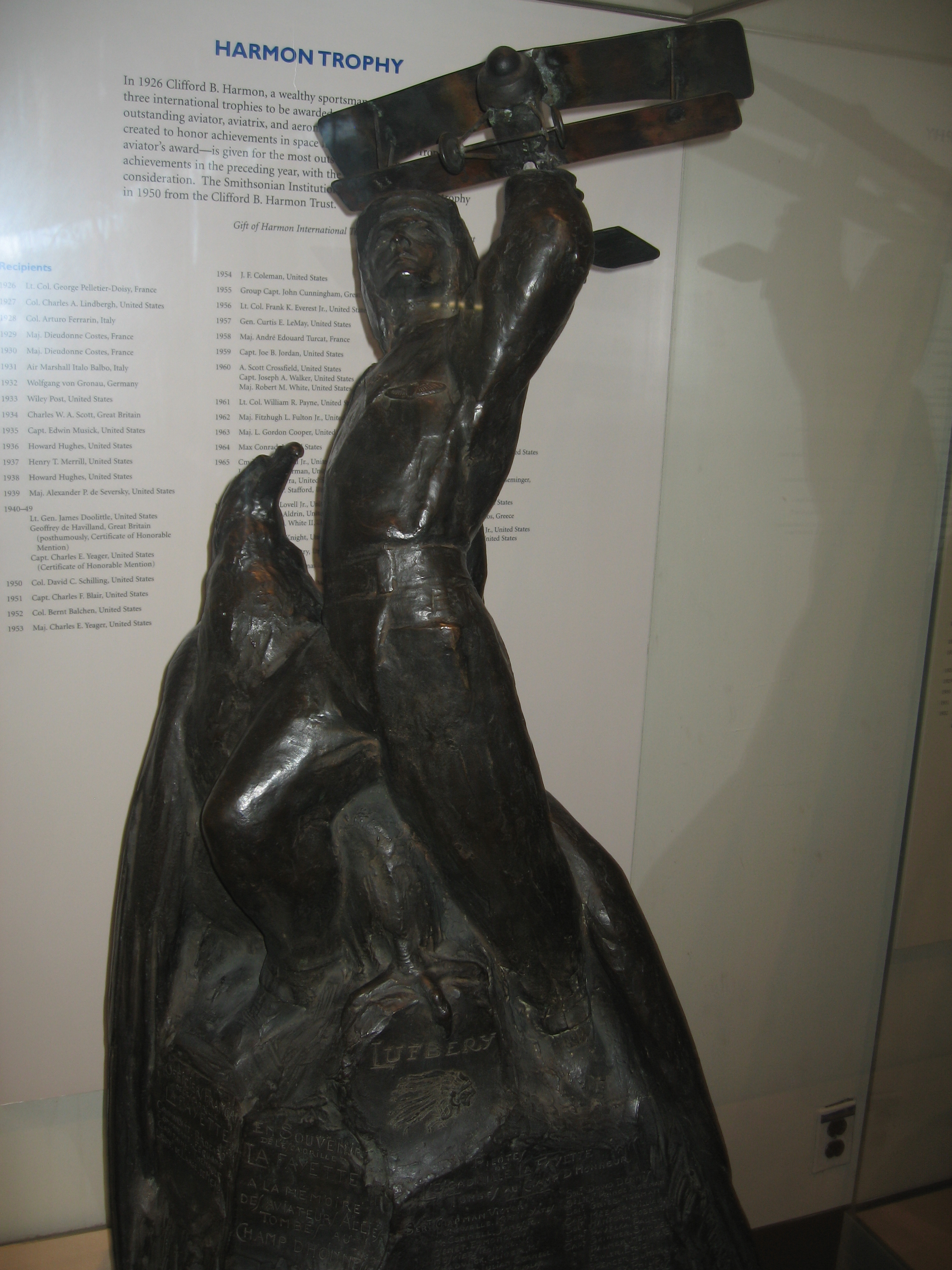
Harmon Trophy awarded to aviators

Mabuchi taught physical education classes and supported Nagayama who was paralyzed on one side surviving a plane crush. As the air raid in Tokyo intensified, they evacuated to Shizuoka prefecture in 1944, where they stayed together after the World War II. Mabuchi taught at a number of girls' schools all through her latter life.

Choko Mabuchi died on 23 February 1985 at Itō, Shizuoka, at the age of 73. She rests in Tama Cemetery in the suburb of Tokyo. Choko Mabuchi is a recipient of the Harmon Trophy in October 1934 as one of the two first Japanese female pilots to cross the Sea of Japan on an overseas flight.

== Related books ==
- Kuroyuri (1934). "聞かずやプロペラーの歌 (馬淵テフ子、孃物語)" [Listen to the propellar: a tale of a young woman, Choko Mabuchi]. Shōjo no tomo. Vol. 27, no. 7. Jitsugyo no Nihon Sha. p. 74. OCLC 459013361.
- Mabuchi, Choko; Ishii, Baku; Chiba, Sachiko; Mishima, Kaiun (1935). Nihon Ryoko Kurabu (ed.). "満州を語る" [My experience and Manchuria]. Travel. Vol. 12, no. 5. Kawashima, Riichiro; Kanemaru, Shigemine; Nakazawa, Fujio. Shinchosha. pp. 100–108. ISSN 0492-1054. OCLC 9251592.
- "知名職業婦人の健康法—馬淵テフ子" [Health keeping method of famous working women: Choko Mabuchi, Kyo Kiuchi, Aguri Yoshiyuki, Takiko Mizunoe et al.]. 婦女界 Fujokai. Vol. 51, no. 2. Fujokaisha. 1935. pp. 302–303. OCLC 41931808.
- Mabuchi, Cho (1935a). "飛行機と共にゐる喜び" [The joy to be flying airplane]. 婦女界 Fujokai. Vol. 51, no. 3. Fujokaisha. pp. 200–201. OCLC 41931808.
- Mabuchi, Choko (1935b). Nihon ryoko kurabu 日本旅行倶楽部 (ed.). "満州を語る" [Talking about Manchuria]. Travel. Vol. 12, no. 5. Shinchosha. pp. 100–108. ISSN 0492-1054. OCLC 9251592.
- Mabuchi, Choko; Matsumoto, Kikuko (1935). "訪滿飛行を終へて" [After the flight to Manchuria]. Fujokai. Vol. 51, no. 1. Fujokaisha.
- Hiraki, Kunio (1992). 天駆ける詩－ふるさとの女流飛行家－飛行家をめざした女性たち [Women who wanted to be aviators]. Shinjinbutsu Oraisha. pp. 222–228. ISBN 4404019661. OCLC 674904160.
- Esashi, Akiko (2005). 時代を拓いた女たち ： かながわの131人 [Pioneers—131 women in Kanagawa Prefecture]. Kanagawa newspaper. ISBN 978-4-876-45358-0. OCLC 676450723.
- Murayama, Shigeyo (2007). "飛行士をめざした卒業生—馬渕てふ子と長山きよ" [Two pilot alumnae: Chouko Mabuchi and Kiyoko Nagayama]. Japan Women's College of Physical Education Bulletin. 37. Japan Women's College of Physical Education: 45–51. ISSN 0285-0095. OCLC 5181036368.
