= Gordon Bennett Cup (ballooning) =

Gas balloon race

Coupe Aéronautique Gordon Bennett
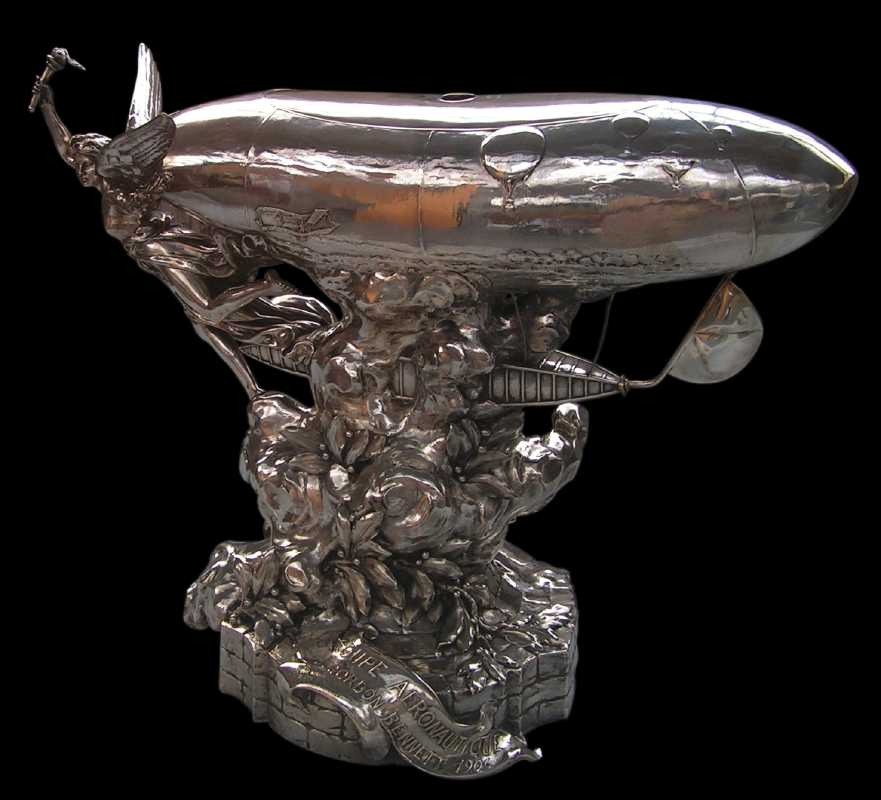
- Sport: Gas ballooning
- English name: Gordon Bennett Cup

History
- First award: September 30, 1906
- Editions: 62
- First winner: Frank Purdy Lahm
- Most wins: Vincent Leys (nine)
- Most recent: Christian Wagner, Stefanie Liller (2024)

The Gordon Bennett Cup (or Coupe Aéronautique Gordon Bennett) is the world's oldest gas balloon race, and is "regarded as the premier event of world balloon racing" according to the Los Angeles Times. Referred to as the "Blue Ribbon" of aeronautics, the first race started from Paris, France, on September 30, 1906. The event was sponsored by James Gordon Bennett Jr., the millionaire sportsman and owner of the New York Herald newspaper. According to the organizers, the aim of the contest "is simple: to fly the furthest distance from the launch site." The contest ran from 1906 to 1938, interrupted from 1914 to 1919 by World War I and in 1931, but was suspended in 1939 when the hosts, Poland, were invaded at the start of World War II. The event was not resurrected until 1979, when American Tom Heinsheimer, an atmospheric physicist, gained permission from the holders to host the trophy. The competition was not officially reinstated by the Fédération Aéronautique Internationale (FAI) until 1983.

The record time for the winner of the event is held by Germans Wilhelm Eimers and Bernd Landsmann who remained airborne for over 92 hours in the 1995 race, taking off from Switzerland and landing four days later in Latvia. The distance record is held by the Belgian duo of Bob Berben and Benoît Siméons who, in 2005, piloted their balloon 3,400 kilometers (2,100 mi) from Albuquerque, New Mexico, United States, to Squatec, Quebec, Canada. The most successful pilots are French Vincent Leys who won the trophy nine times between 1997 and 2017 (six times as the main pilot, three times as the co-pilot) and Austrian Josef Starkbaum (won seven times as the main pilot). American teams have won on the most occasions, with twelve victories.

The 2010 competition started in the United Kingdom, with the balloons departing from Bristol on September 25. The race was marred by the loss of the American team during a storm over the Adriatic Sea on October 1. The balloon was missing until December 6, when a fishing vessel found the cabin containing the pilots' bodies off the coast of Italy. The 2013 event, departing from France and landing in Portugal, was again won by the French in F-PPGB.

== Rules ==
According to the official rules, the competition is open to all National Aero Clubs (NACs) "who have met their obligations to the FAI", with each NAC being allowed to enter up to three teams whose pilots are of the same nationality as the NAC. Before this, only two teams from any single NAC were permitted to compete in a single competition. Pilots should have at least 50 hours experience as pilot in command and be authorized for night-time flying. At least one member of each team must be capable of communicating with Air Traffic Control in English.

The team who wins the contest receives the Coupe Aéronautique Gordon Bennett trophy and the team's NAC will hold the contest two years later (originally the winning NAC would host the competition the following year). Any NAC winning the cup in three consecutive races will be the final holder of the cup with the subsequent option to offer a new cup.

== Unofficial events ==
Resurrected in 1979 by American Tom Heinsheimer, the competition was held without official FAI sanction for four years. Ben Abruzzo and Maxie Anderson secured victory piloting Double Eagle III 987 kilometers (613 mi) in 47 hours from California to Colorado. The following year, the winning team of Jerry Tepper and Corky Myers floated 862 kilometers (536 mi) from the takeoff point in California. The 1981 race was won again by Abruzzo, with different co-pilot Rocky Aoki, who covered 2,168 kilometers (1,347 mi) before touching down, while the 1982 race was won by Joe Kittinger and Charles Knapp who piloted Rosie O'Grady 1,423 kilometers (884 mi). Heinsheimer attempted to gain the copyright over the name "Gordon Bennett" and run the event without FAI sanction. However the FAI were granted exclusive rights to the name in 1983, and the organization officially reinstated the competition later that year. Heinsheimer went on to arrange further contests in the United States which were still reported in the national press as being the "Gordon Bennett Balloon Race" or similar.

== Incidents ==
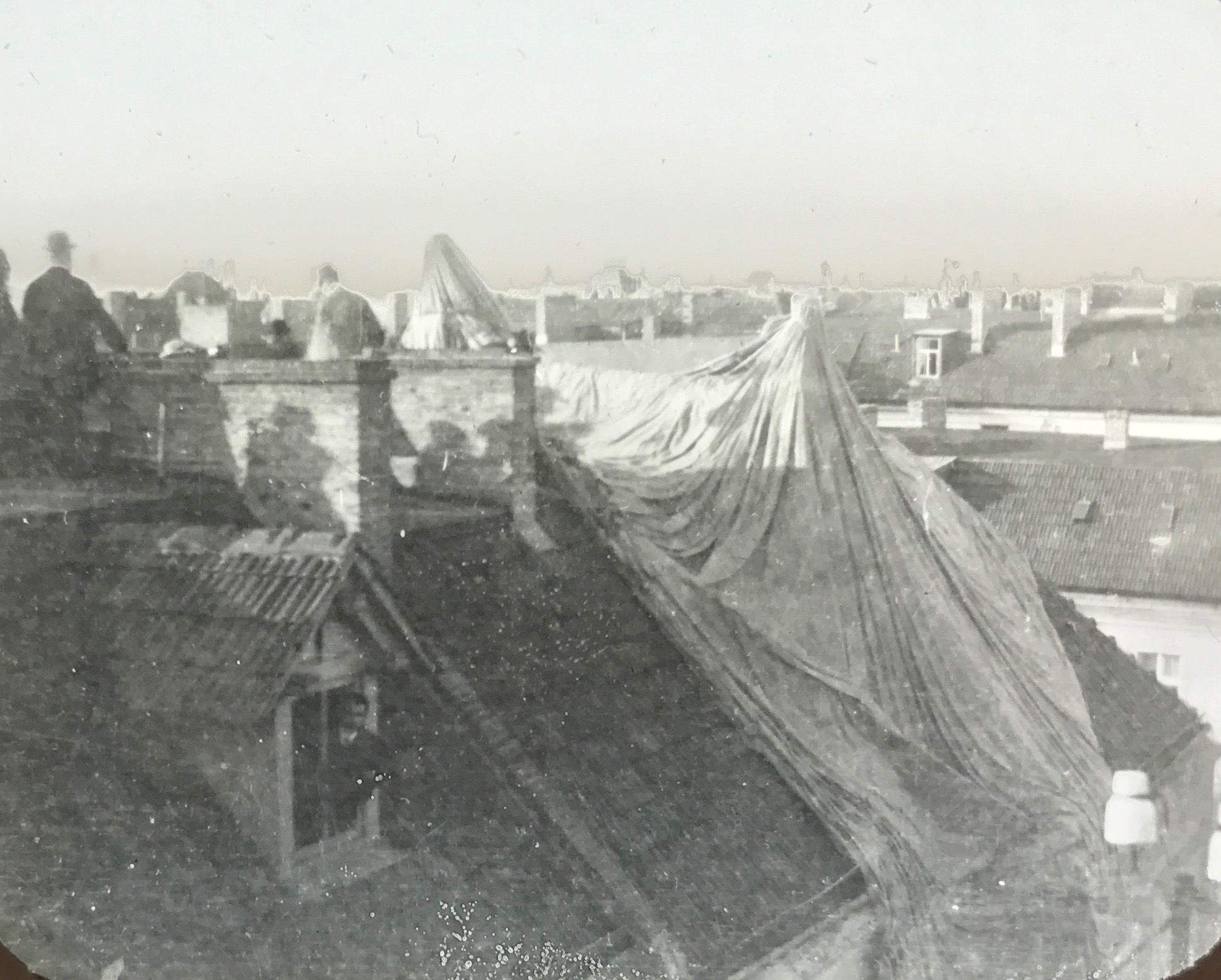
Conqueror draped over houses of Berlin 1908

The 1908 race in Berlin saw the fall of the balloon Conqueror, flown by A. Holland Forbes and Augustus Post. Conqueror was the largest balloon entered in the race, standing 80 feet (24 m) high and with a gas capacity of 80,000 cubic feet (2,300 m^{3}). Before the race Forbes had attempted to lengthen the balloon's appendix to give the team a strategic advantage. Instead the balloon hit a fence just after takeoff, lost two ballast bags, ascended rapidly and ripped open three minutes into the race. The pair slashed off ballast as they fell 3,000 feet (910 m). Their descent was slowed only as the balloon's fabric caught in the netting and formed a rough parachute. They took hold of the ring above them and lifted their feet as the basket smashed through the tiled roof of a house in the Berlin suburb of Friedenau. Both the men and their instruments survived intact.

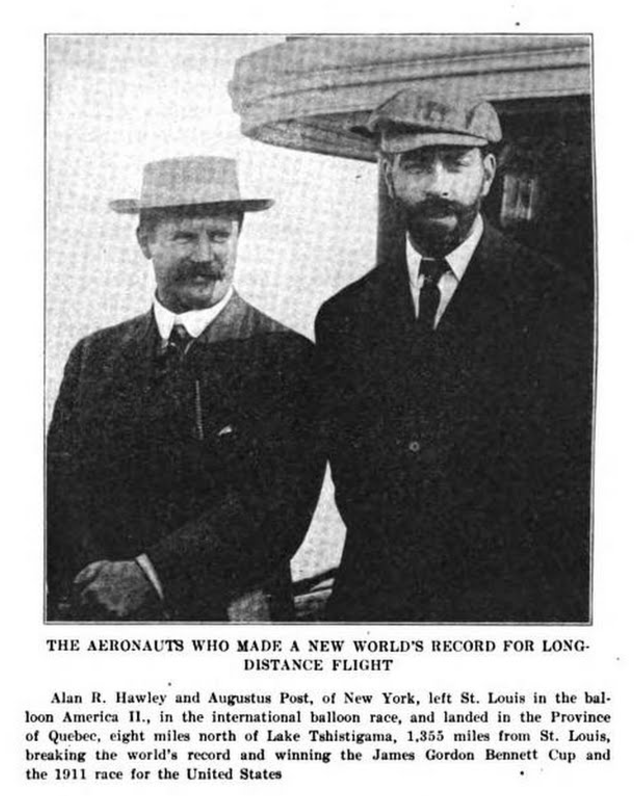
Hawley and Post following 1910 Gordon Bennett Cup

The winners of the 1910 Gordon Bennett Cup, Alan R. Hawley and Augustus Post, set a distance and duration record of 1,173 miles (1,888 km) in 44 hours and 25 minutes, but the pair of experienced balloonists landed in a remote section of Canadian wilderness in Quebec. After a week passed with no word from the team, search parties were formed by the Aero Club of America, but many newspapers reported that the men were likely dead. Instead they emerged after ten days, assisted by two local trappers who had been out on a hunting trip and happened to run into them. Hawley had injured a knee, but otherwise the pair were unharmed and received a hero's welcome upon their safe return.

On September 23, 1923, five competitors were killed when they were struck by lightning while six more were injured in storms. Among the dead were Lieutenants John W. Choptaw and Robert S. Olmsted who were killed when their balloon "US Army S6" crashed in Loosbroek, Netherlands. Sixty years later, in 1983, Americans Maxie Anderson and Don Ida were killed as the gondola detached from their balloon during an attempt to avoid crossing into East German airspace. Anderson and Ida were participating in the "Coupe Charles et Robert" (named for Jacques Charles and the Robert brothers, inventors of the gas balloon) which was run in parallel with the Gordon Bennett Cup. Following their deaths, the "Coupe Charles et Robert" was never run again.

On September 12, 1995, three gas balloons participating in the race entered Belarusian air space. Despite the fact that competition organizers had informed the Belarusian Government about the race in May and that flight plans had been filed, a Mil Mi-24B attack helicopter of the Belarusian Air Force shot down one balloon, killing two American citizens, Alan Fraenckel and John Stuart-Jervis. Another of the balloons was forced to land while the third landed safely over two hours after the initial downing. The crews of the two balloons were fined for entering Belarus without a visa and released. Belarus has neither apologized nor offered compensation for the deaths.

On September 29, 2010, the 2004 trophy-winning American team of Richard Abruzzo and Carol Rymer Davis went missing in thunderstorms over the Adriatic Sea. On September 30, the USA retrieval crew suggested that the balloon may have ditched in the sea or have been destroyed by lightning. Debris was found on October 1 by search crews but race control determined that it was not from the missing balloon. Despite this, organizers later stated that the final calculated rate of descent of the balloon had been about 50 miles per hour (80 km/h), and that the team's survival was "unlikely". The search for the missing pair was called off on October 4. The balloon's cabin containing the bodies was recovered by an Italian fishing boat on December 6.

== Official winners ==
Key

Record breaking flights are denoted by the following:

Record *

Edition	Start date^{[A]}	Starting point	Crew	Country	Balloon name	Time (hh:mm)	Distance (km)
1	September 30, 1906	Tuileries, Paris (France)	Frank Lahm, Henry Hersey	USA	United States	22:15	641.10
2	October 21, 1907	St. Louis (United States)	Oskar Erbslöh, Henry Helm Clayton	Germany	Pommern	40:00	1403.55
3	October 11, 1908	Berlin (Germany)	Theodor Schaek, Emil Messner	Switzerland	Helvetia	73:01	1190.00
4	October 3, 1909	Zürich (Switzerland)	Edgar W. Mix, Andre Roussel	USA	America II	35:07	1121.11
5	October 17, 1910	St. Louis (United States)	Alan Ramsay Hawley, Augustus Post	USA	America II	44:25	1887.60
6	October 5, 1911	Kansas City (United States)	Hans Gericke, Otto Duncker	Germany	Berlin II	12:28	757.84
7	October 27, 1912	Stuttgart (Germany)	Maurice Bienaimé, René Rumpelmayer	France	La Picardie	45:42	2191.00
8	October 12, 1913	Paris (France)	Ralph Hazlett Upson, Ralph Albion Drury Preston	USA	Goodyear	43:30	618.00
9	October 23, 1920	Birmingham (United States)	Ernest Demuyter, Mathieu Labrousse	Belgium	Belgica	40:15	1769.00
10	September 18, 1921	Brussels (Belgium)	Paul Armbruster, Louis Ansermier	Switzerland	Zürich	27:24	766.00
11	August 6, 1922	Geneva (Switzerland)	Ernest Demuyter, Alexander Veenstra	Belgium	Belgica	25:49	1372.10
12	September 23, 1923	Brussels (Belgium)	Ernest Demuyter, Leon Coeckelbergh	Belgium	Belgica	21:00	1155.00
13	June 15, 1924	Brussels (Belgium)	Ernest Demuyter, Leon Coeckelbergh	Belgium	Belgica	43:16	714.00
14	June 7, 1925	Brussels (Belgium)	Alexander Veenstra, Philippe Quersin	Belgium	Prince Leopold	47:30	1345.00
15	May 30, 1926	Antwerp (Belgium)	Ward Van Orman, Walter W. Morton	USA	Goodyear III	16:37	864.00
16	September 10, 1927	Detroit (United States)	Edward J. Hill, Arthur G. Schlosser	USA	Detroit	48:00	1198.00
17	June 30, 1928	Detroit (United States)	William Elsworth Kepner, William Olmstead Eareckson	USA	US Army	48:00	740.80
18	September 28, 1929	St. Louis (United States)	Ward Van Orman, Alan L. McCracken	USA	Goodyear VIII	24:00	548.94
19	September 1, 1930	Cleveland (United States)	Ward Van Orman, Alan L. McCracken	USA	Goodyear VIII	27:56	872.00
20	September 25, 1932	Basel (Switzerland)	Thomas G. W. Settle, Wilfred Bushnell	USA	US Navy	41:20	1550.00
21	September 2, 1933	Chicago (United States)	Franciszek Hynek, Zbigniew Burzyński	Poland	SP-ADS Kościuszko	38:32	1361.00
22	September 23, 1934	Warsaw (Poland)	Franciszek Hynek, Władysław Pomaski	Poland	SP-ADS Kościuszko	44:48	1333.00
23	September 16, 1935	Warsaw (Poland)	Zbigniew Burzyński, Władysław Wysocki	Poland	SP-AMY Polonia II	57:54	1650.47
24	August 30, 1936	Warsaw (Poland)	Ernest Demuyter, Pierre Hoffmans	Belgium	OO-BFM Belgica	46:24	1715.80
25	June 20, 1937	Brussels (Belgium)	Ernest Demuyter, Pierre Hoffmans	Belgium	OO-BFM Belgica	46:15	1396.00
26	September 11, 1938	Liège (Belgium)	Antoni Janusz, Franciszek Janik	Poland	SP-BCU LOPP	37:47	1692.00
—	September 3, 1939	Lwów (Poland)^{[B]}	—	—	—	—	—
27	June 25, 1983	Paris (France)	Stefan Makné, Ireneusz Cieślak	Poland	SP-BZO Polonez	36:00	690.00
28	October 13, 1984	Zürich (Switzerland)	Karl Spenger, Martin Messner	Switzerland	HB-BFC Jura	43:08	793.00
29	September 28, 1985	Geneva (Switzerland)	Josef Starkbaum, Gert Scholz	Austria	HB-BBL Volksbank	21:09	342.00
30	October 18, 1986	Salzburg (Austria)	Josef Starkbaum, Gert Scholz	Austria	HB-BBL Volksbank	19:11	272.43
31	October 3, 1987	Seefeld (Austria)	Josef Starkbaum, Gert Scholz	Austria	HB-BBL Volksbank	32:16	852.00
32	October 23, 1988	Bregenz (Austria)	Josef Starkbaum, Gert Scholz	Austria	OE-PZS Polarstern	41:09	1110.90
33	September 16, 1989	Lech (Austria)	Josef Starkbaum, Gert Scholz	Austria	OE-PZS Polarstern	37:33	911.20
34	September 2, 1990	Lech (Austria)	Josef Starkbaum, Gert Scholz	Austria	OE-PZS Polarstern	33:20	692.50
35	September 21, 1991	Lech (Austria)	Volker Kuinke, Jürgen Schubert	Germany	D-EUREGIO	44:18	1039.40
36	September 19, 1992	Stuttgart (Germany)	David N. Levin, James Herschend	USA	D-ASPEN	45:36	964.19
37	October 4, 1993	Albuquerque (United States)	Josef Starkbaum, Rainer Röhsler	Austria	OE-PZS Polarstern	59:29	1832.00
38	September 18, 1994	Lech (Austria)	Karl Spenger, Christian Stoll	Switzerland	HB-BZH Stadt Wil	31:01	825.14
39	September 9, 1995	Wil (Switzerland)	Wilhelm Eimers, Bernd Landsmann	Germany	D-OCOL Columbus II	92:11 *	1628.10
40	September 28, 1996	Warstein (Germany)	Wilhelm Eimers, Bernd Landsmann	Germany	D-OCOL Columbus II	72:01	1286.90
41	September 7, 1997	Warstein (Germany)	Vincent Leys, Jean François Leys	France	F-PPSE Le Petit Prince	45:30	1732.50
42	September 12, 1998	Paris (France)^{[C]}	—	—	—	—	—
43	October 1, 1999	Albuquerque (United States)	Phillipe de Cock, Ronny Van Havere	Belgium	D-OCOX Belgica II	40:15	1666.54
44	September 9, 2000	Saint-Hubert (Belgium)	Wilhelm Eimers, Bernd Landsmann	Germany	D-OOWE Columbus IV	70:49	795.70
45	September 8, 2001	Warstein (Germany)	Vincent Leys, Jean François Leys	France	F-PPSE Le Petit Prince	77:47	1626.60
46	August 31, 2002	Châtellerault (France)	Vincent Leys, Jean François Leys	France	F-PPSE Le Petit Prince	69:59	1282.30
47	September 14, 2003	Arc-et-Senans (France)	Vincent Leys, Jean François Leys	France	F-PPSE Le Petit Prince	53:42	1596.50
48	August 29, 2004	Thionville (France)	Richard Abruzzo, Carol Rymer Davis	USA	N96YD Zero Gravity	52:52	1803.36
49	October 1, 2005	Albuquerque (United States)	Bob Berben, Benoît Siméons	Belgium	N6326T	65:20	3400.39 *
50	September 9, 2006	Waasmunster (Belgium)	Philippe de Cock, Ronny Van Havere	Belgium	D-OCOX Belgica 2	66:53	2449.60
51	September 15, 2007	Brussels (Belgium)^{[C]}	—	—	—	—	—
52	October 7, 2008	Albuquerque (United States)	David Hempleman-Adams, Jonathan Mason	Great Britain	N5054 Lady Luck	74:12	1768.67
53	September 5, 2009	Geneva (Switzerland)	Sébastien Rolland, Vincent Leys	France	F-PPSE Golden Eyes	85:18	1588.29
54	September 25, 2010	Bristol (England)	Kurt Frieden, Pascal Witpraechtiger	Switzerland	HB-QKF	58:37	2434.31
55	September 10, 2011	Gap-Tallard (France)	Sébastien Rolland, Vincent Leys	France	F-PPSE	26:42	779.83
56	August 31, 2012	Toggenburg (Switzerland)	Sébastien Rolland, Vincent Leys	France	F-PPGB	69:02	1620.06
57	August 24, 2013	Grand Nancy-Tomblaine (France)	Vincent Leys, Christophe Houver	France	F-PPGB	73:33	1402.42
58	August 29, 2014	Vichy (France)	Wilhelm Eimers, Matthias Zenge	Germany	D-OTLI	61:35	1410.64
59	August 28, 2015	Pau (France)	Kurt Frieden, Pascal Witprächtiger	Switzerland	HB-QKF	68:21	2080.80
60	September 18, 2016	Gladbeck (Germany)	Kurt Frieden, Pascal Witprächtiger	Switzerland	HB-QKF MM Technics	58:12	1803.40
61	September 8, 2017	Fribourg (Switzerland)	Vincent Leys, Christophe Houver	France	F-PPGB	36:20	1836.06
62	September 27, 2018	Bern (Switzerland)	Mateusz Rękas, Jacek Bogdański	Poland	D-OWBA	58:28	1145.29
63	September 13, 2019	Montbéliard (France)	Laurent Sciboz, Nicolas Tieche	Switzerland	HB-QRV	82:03	1774,76
64	August 21, 2021	Toruń (Poland)	Kurt Frieden, Pascal Witprächtiger	Switzerland	HB-QKF MM Technics	85:10	1559,68
65	September 2, 2022	St. Gallen (Switzerland)	Wilhelm Eimers, Benjamin Eimers	Germany	D-OTLI Leonid	60:50	1572,36
66	October 7, 2023	Albuquerque (United States)	Eric Decellières, Benoit Havret	France	F-PPSE Le Petit Prince	85:49	2661,40
67	September 17, 2024	Münster (Germany)	Christian "Wuzi" Wagner, Stefanie Liller	Austria	OE-ZZM	67:01	2111,17
68	September 9, 2025	Metz (France)	Kurt Frieden, Pascal Witprächtiger	Switzerland	HB-BLA	67:30	1359,09
69	August 28, 2026	Gladbeck (Germany)	Balthasar Wicki, René Erni	Switzerland	HB-QWV	41:04	1555,18

Gordon Bennett Cup images
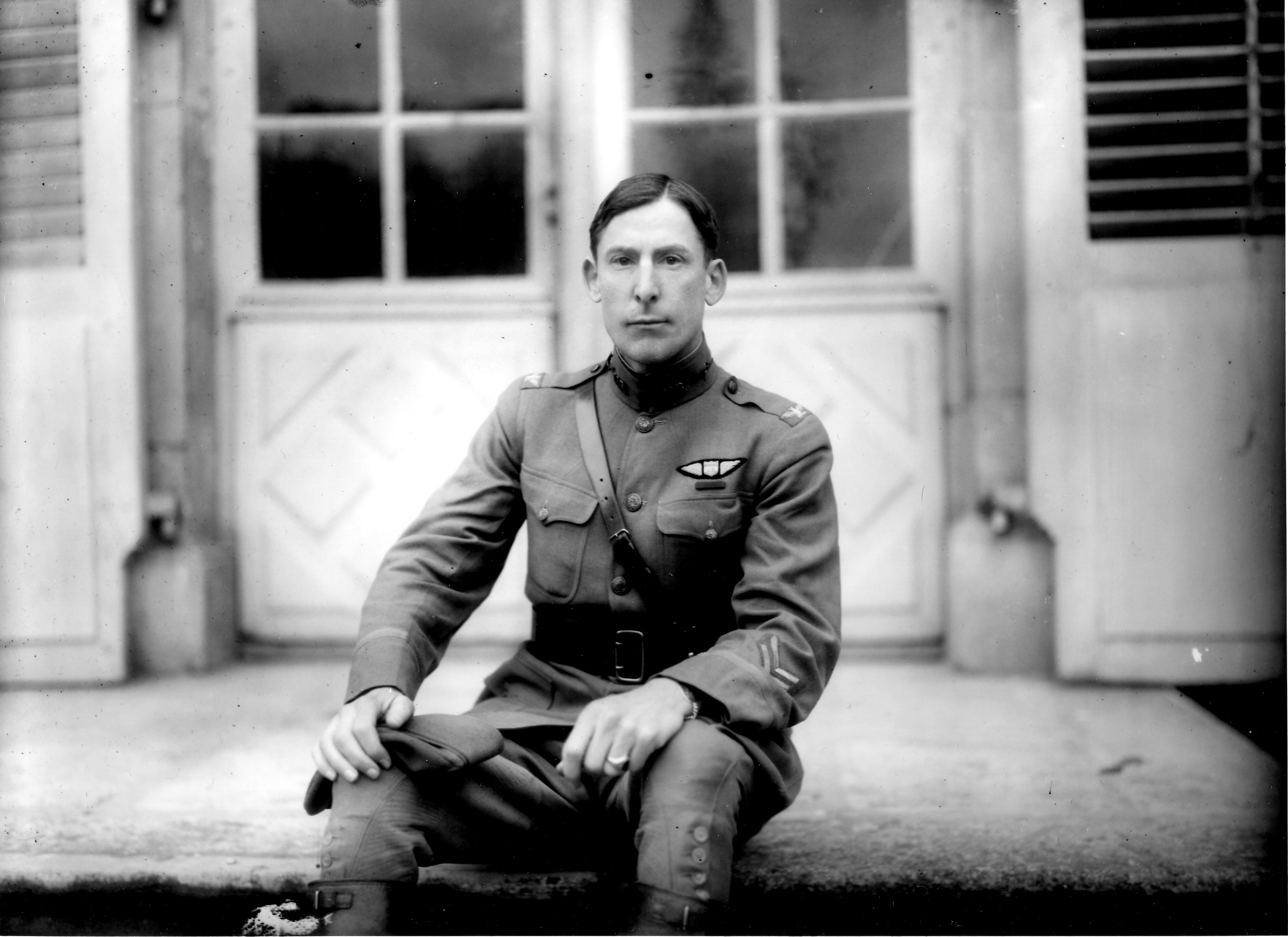
Frank Lahm, inaugural winner of the cup

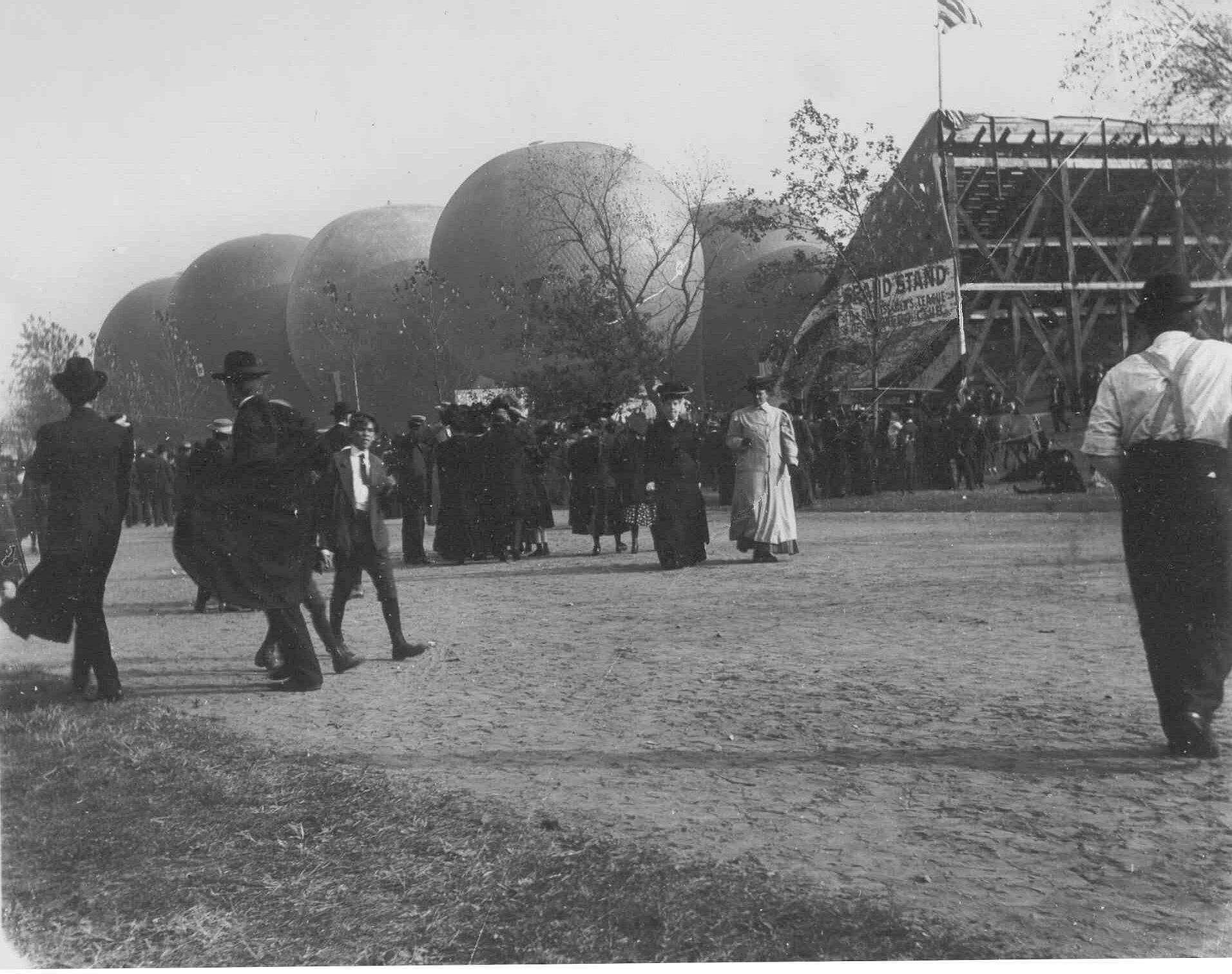
St. Louis GB Cup 1907, mass inflation of balloons

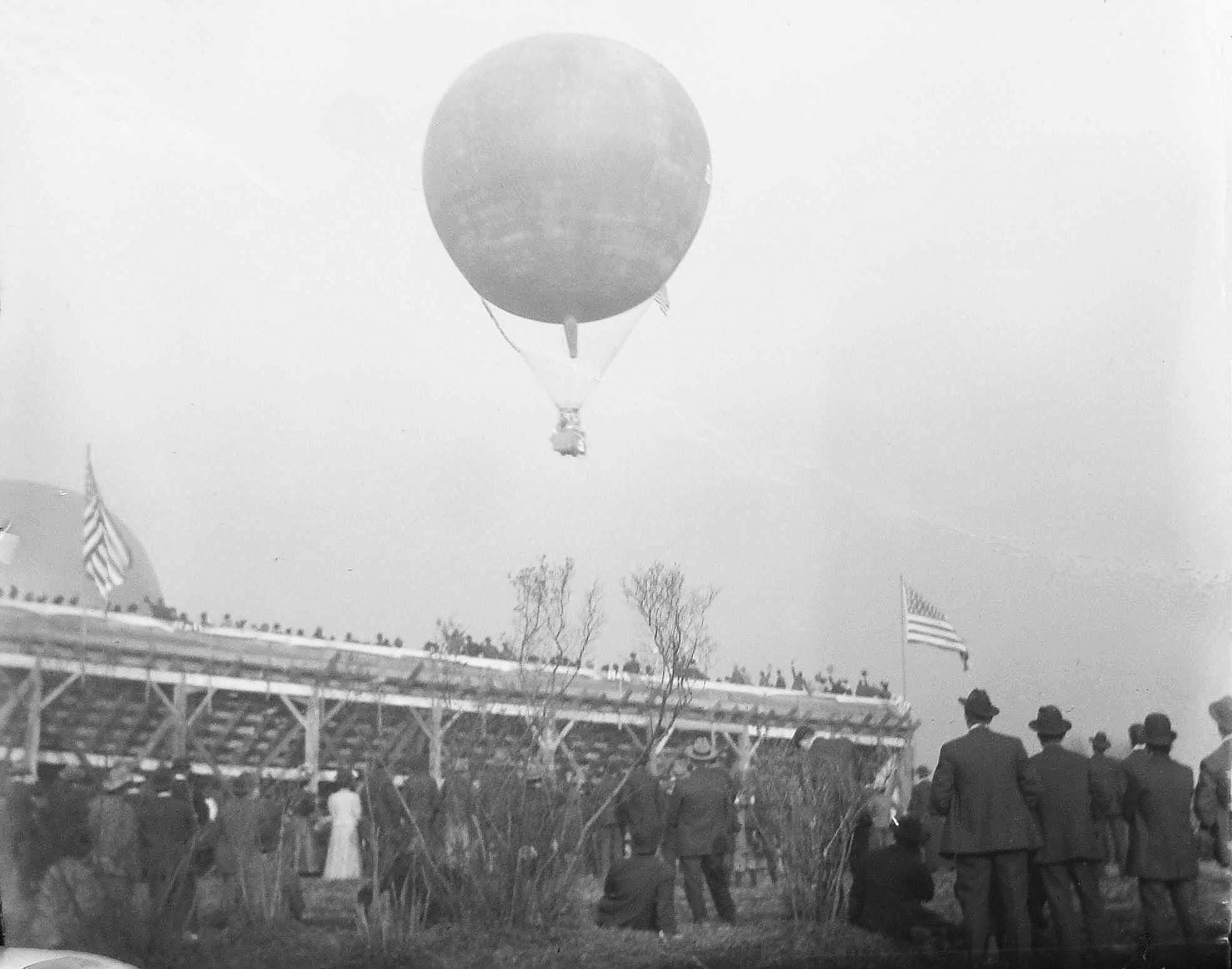
The balloon United States rises, October 21, 1907, St. Louis, Gordon Bennett 'Great Balloon Race of 1907'

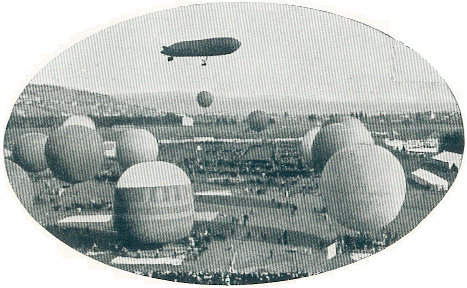
Gordon Bennett balloon race in 1909, Zürich featuring the Parseval airship PL-1

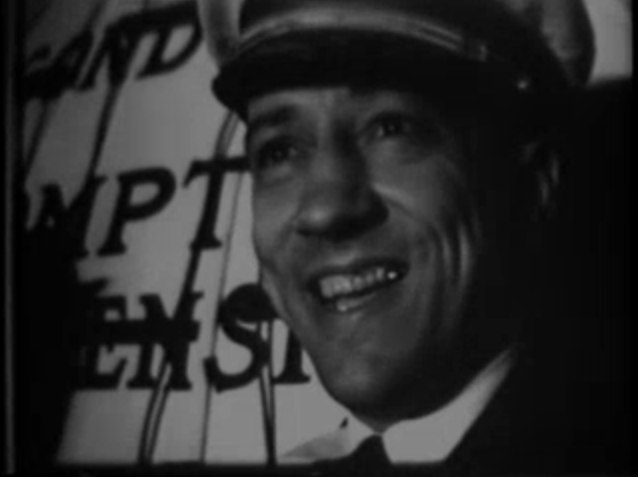
1932 winning pilot Thomas G. W. Settle

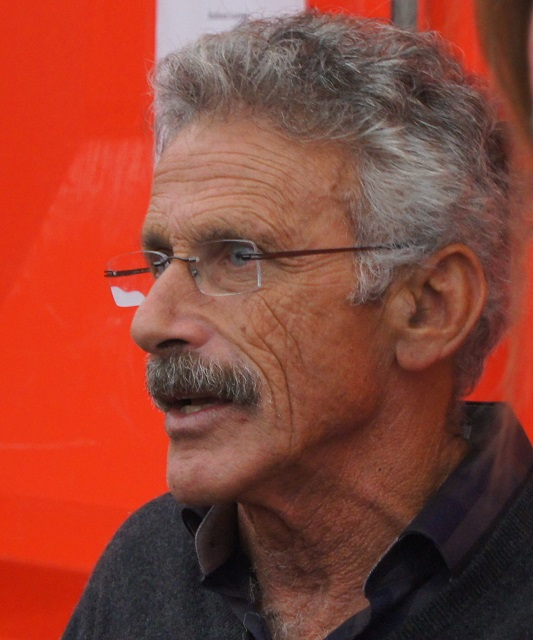
1992 winning pilot David N. Levin

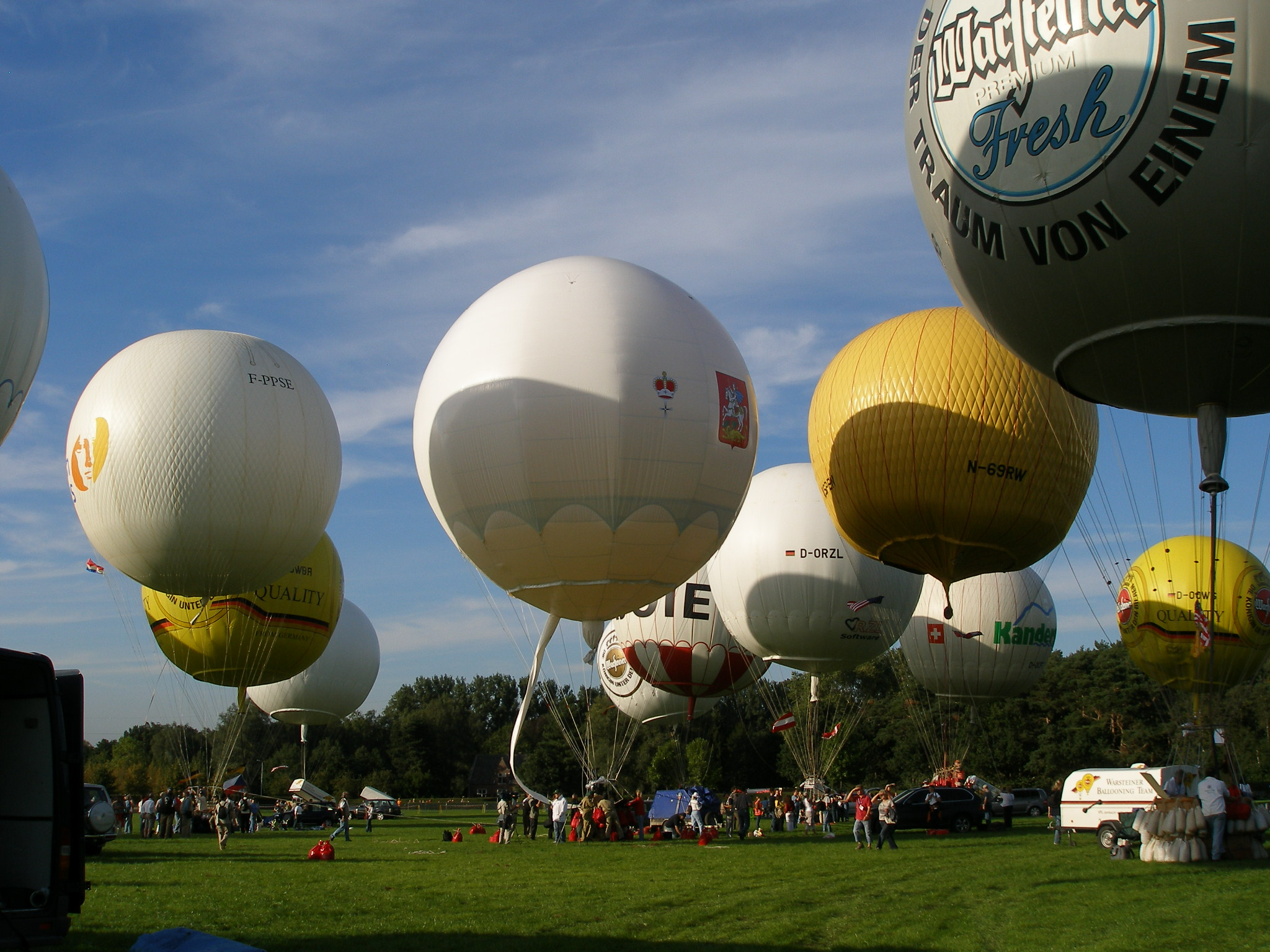
Launch day of the 50th Gordon Bennett Cup in Waasmunster, Oost-Vlaanderen

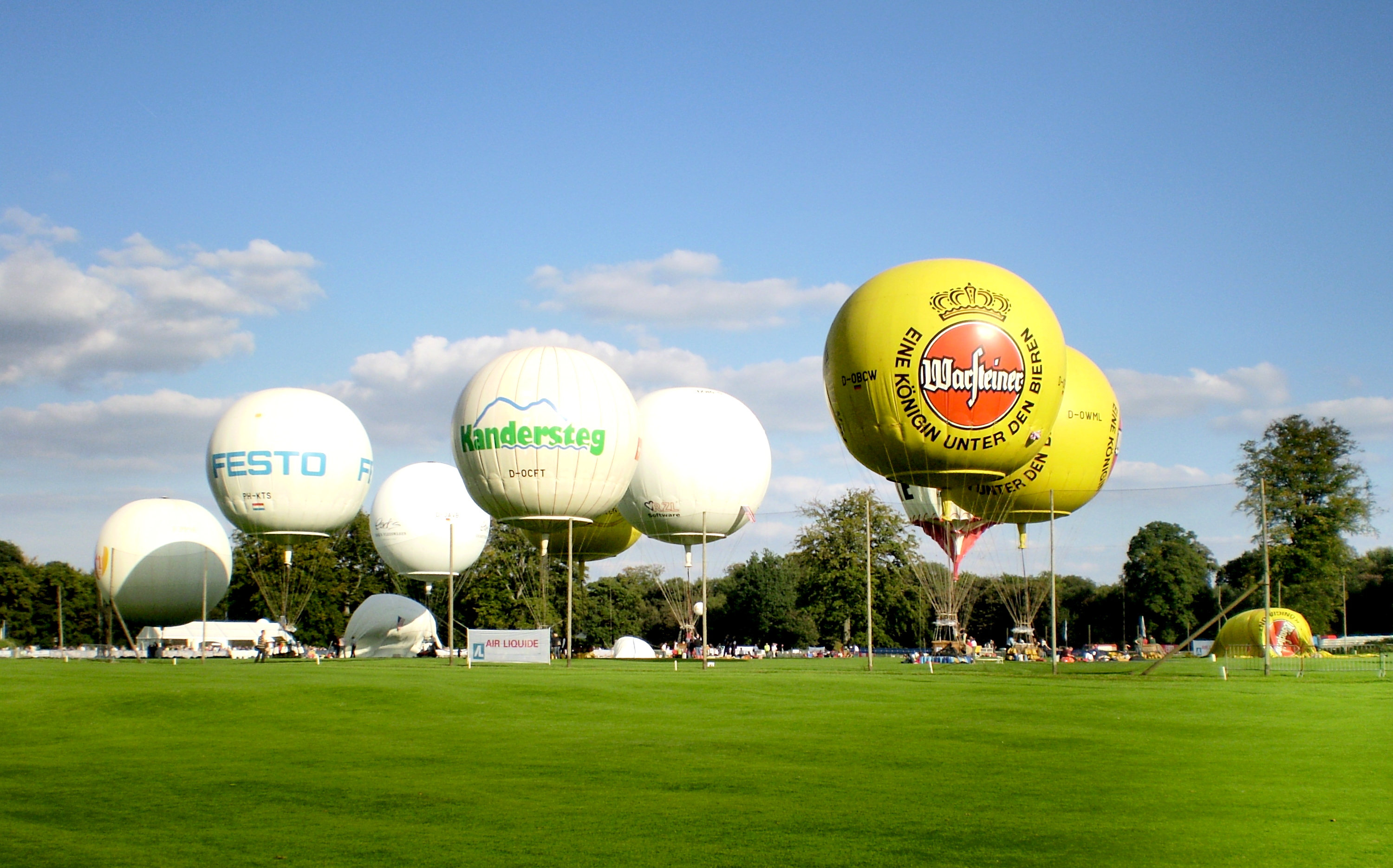
Gordon Bennett Cup 2007, Brussels

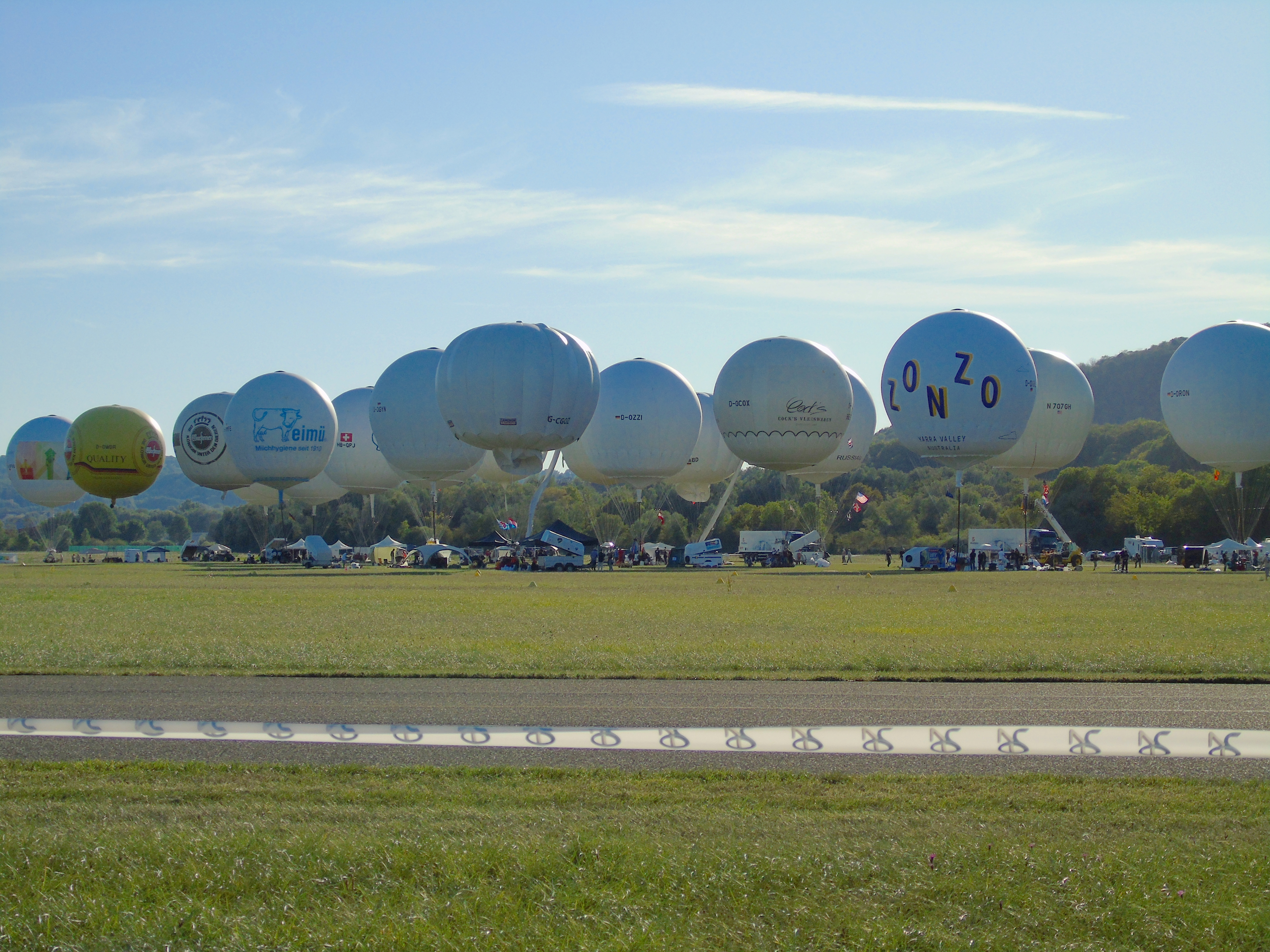
Start of Gordon Bennett race in Montbéliard - 2019.
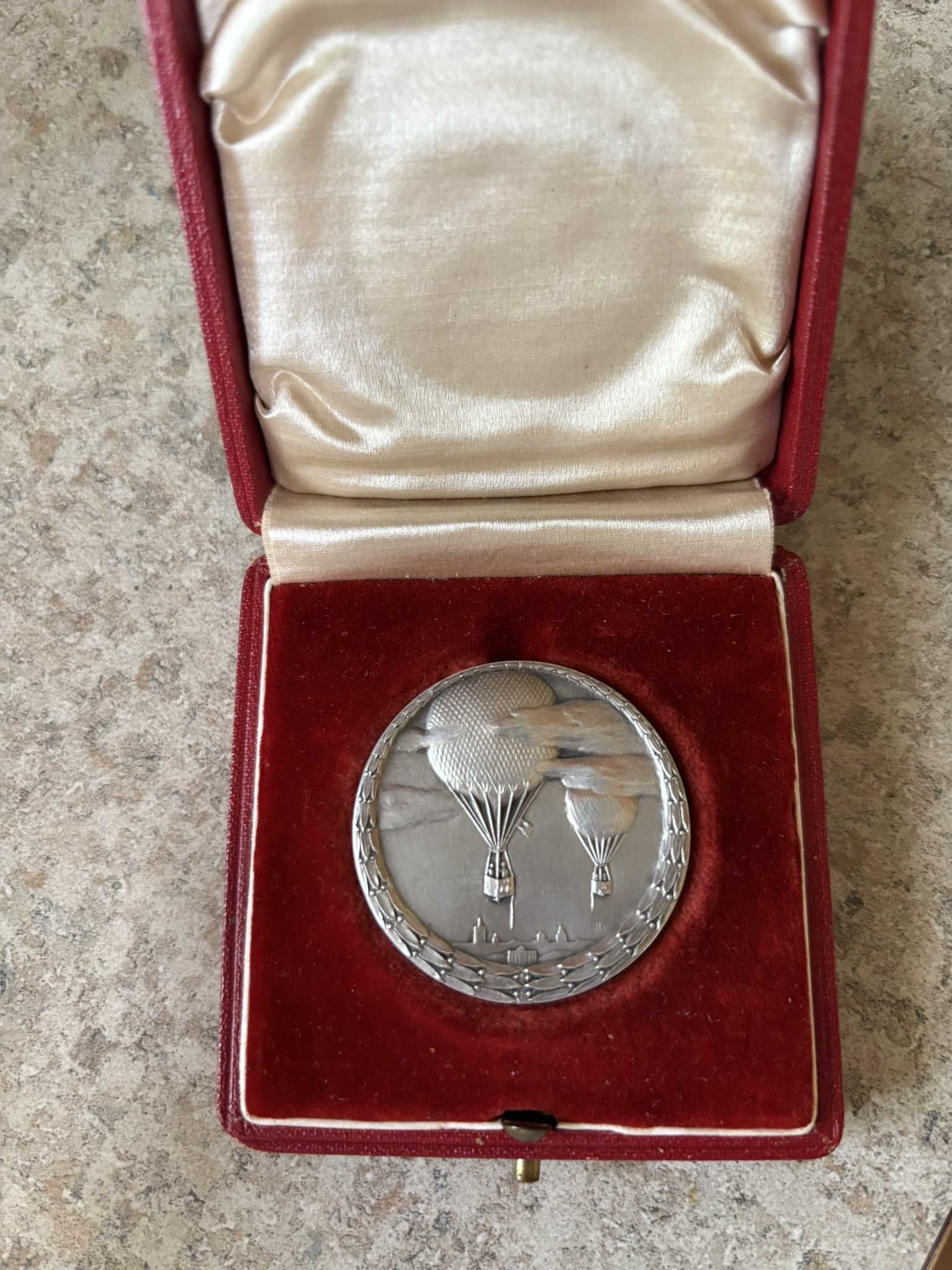
Silver Medal from 1908 Gordon Bennett Race, Berlin

== See also ==
- Gordon Bennett Cup in auto racing
- Hot air balloon festivals

== Notes ==
- ^{A} The competition was not held from 1914 to 1919 as a result of World War I, not held in 1931, nor from 1939 to 1982.
- ^{B} Canceled as a result of the outbreak of World War II.
- ^{C} Canceled due to bad weather.
