= David Hempleman-Adams =

British industrialist and adventurer (born 1956)

Sir David Hempleman-Adams KCVO OBE GCStJ DL
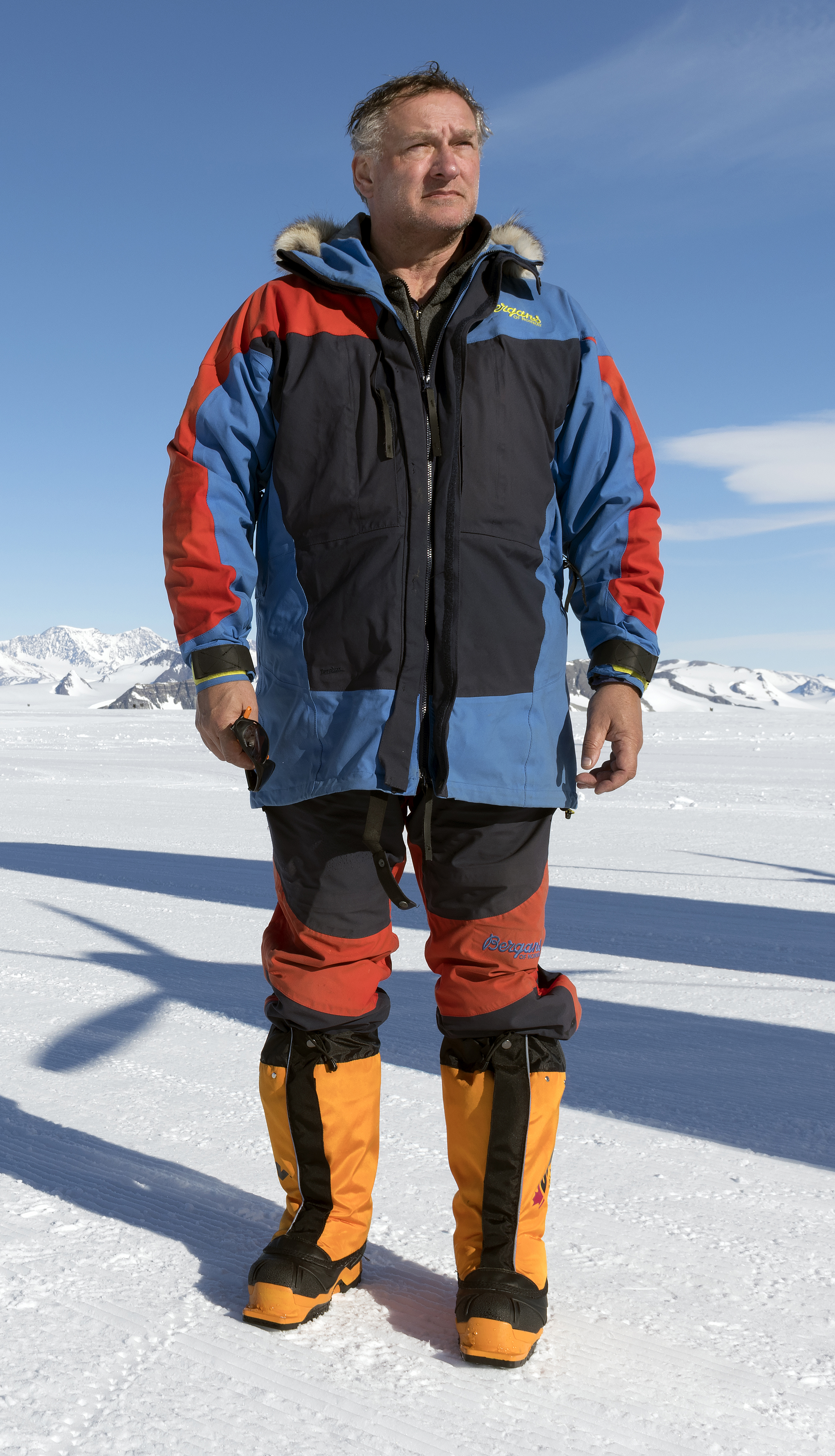
- Hempleman-Adams in 2018
- Born: 10 October 1956 (age 69); Swindon, Wiltshire, England

Sir David Kim Hempleman-Adams (born 10 October 1956) is a British industrialist and adventurer.

He is the first British person to complete the Explorer's Grand Slam, by reaching the Geographic and Magnetic North and South Poles, as well as climbing the highest peaks in all seven continents, the first person to fly to the North Pole in a balloon, and the first person to make a balloon crossing of the Atlantic in an open basket.

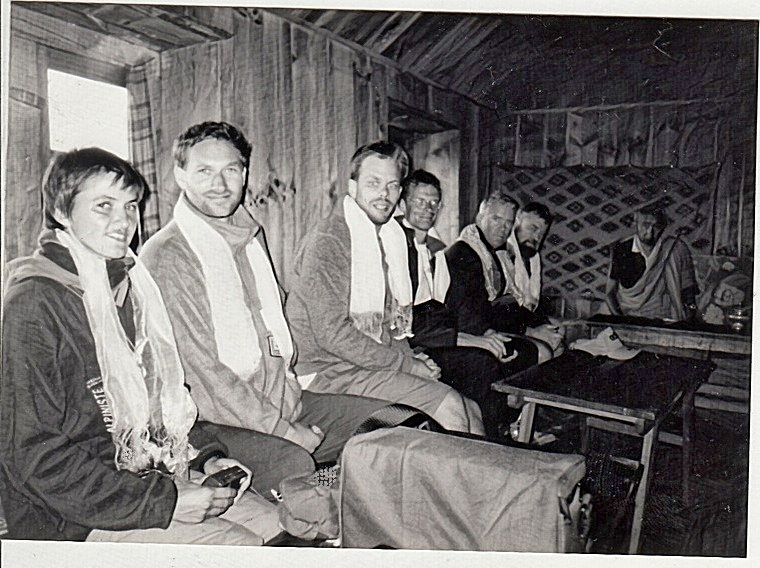
Everest climbers receive Tengboche blessing. Ginette Harrison, David Hempleman-Adams, David Callaway, Scott McIvor, Lee Nobmann, Brian Blessed.

== Early life ==
David Hempleman was born in Moredon, Swindon on 10 October 1956. Following his parents' divorce, he moved with his mother to Stoney Littleton near Bath, and, when she remarried, took his stepfather's surname, Adams.

He took part in The Duke of Edinburgh's Award scheme at school, then pursued business studies at college in Manchester and at Bristol Polytechnic. At the same time, he started climbing with fellow student Steven Vincent.

== Expeditions ==
In January 2007, Hempleman-Adams broke the quarter-century old world small sized hot air balloon altitude record, by ascending to 9,906 meters over Alberta, Canada, beating the previous record of 9,537 metres set by Carol Davis in New Mexico.

In September 2009, he broke the endurance record for a flight using the smallest man-carrying helium balloon. He flew 200 miles from Butler, Missouri, to Cherokee, Oklahoma, in 14 hours and 15 minutes using the class AA-01 balloon. The previous record was an eight hours and 12 minutes flight undertaken by American Coy Foster in March 1983.

On 10 October 2008, Hempleman-Adams, along with co-pilot Jon Mason won the 52nd Gordon Bennett Cup, having flown a helium balloon from Albuquerque, New Mexico and landing over 1000 miles away near Madison, Wisconsin. They are the first British team to win the prize in 102 years.

In September 2010, he competed in the Gordon Bennett 2010 balloon race when it was held in the UK for the first time.

== Personal and family life ==
He lives in Wiltshire with his partner Ros Smith and has three daughters from his previous marriage.

In April 2008 his middle daughter, Camilla, at the age of 15, became the youngest person to ski the last degree to the North Pole. In March 2025 Camilla did a solo traverse in Auyuittuq National Park on Baffin Island in Canada.

In December 2011 his youngest daughter, Amelia, at the age of 16 became the youngest person to ski to the South Pole, having completed Shackleton's last 98 nautical miles. In 2021 she competed at the Henley Royal Regatta.

== Social and charitable work ==
He retired as a Trustee of St John Ambulance in 2021, having been involved with the charity for 26 years and having held senior positions since 1999. In 2002 he raised money to buy ambulances for St John through a series of lectures. In 2019 he sailed from Plymouth, England, to New York, to promote the work of St John and to encourage young people to try something new. In 2023 he agreed to take on a newly created senior volunteer role for St John International (SJI) as an ambassador leading its newly created Special Projects group. In this role he has been instrumental in leading St John International through the development of its new fundraising strategy.

In summer 2016, Hempleman-Adams completed the Polar Ocean Challenge, an historic attempt to be the first British sailing yacht to sail around the Arctic Ocean in one summer season, circumnavigating the North Pole and sailing through the Northeast and Northwest Passages. This expedition was undertaken to increase awareness of climate change and loss of ice in the Arctic Ocean.

In October 2004, he was appointed a Deputy Lieutenant for Wiltshire (DL). He was appointed High Sheriff of Wiltshire for the year 2016–17.

== Honours and awards ==
Hempleman-Adams was appointed a Member of the Order of the British Empire (MBE) in the 1995 Birthday Honours and promoted to Officer of the same Order (OBE) in the 1998 Birthday Honours, both "for services to Arctic exploration". In 1998, he was awarded two honorary degrees, i.e. an honorary Master of Arts degree from the University of Bath, and a Doctor of Science from the University of Leicester. The following year 1999, he received an honorary Master of Science degree from the Manchester Metropolitan University. In 2000, he was awarded the Gold Medal of the Royal Aero Club, and in 2004, the Explorers Medal from The Explorers Club.

In 2005, Hempleman-Adams was appointed a Member of the Venerable Order of Saint John (MStJ), followed by promotions to Officer (OStJ) in 2008, Commander (CStJ) in 2011, Knight of Justice (KStJ) in 2016, and finally Bailiff Grand Cross (GCStJ) in 2025. In 2021, he and his partner Ros Smith were also awarded the Life Saving Medal of the Order in Silver in recognition of "their conspicuous acts of bravery performed, at personal risk to themselves, in saving or attempting to save the lives of others".

In 2006, he received the honorary degree of Doctor of Science from Richmond American University London. Hempleman-Adams was appointed a Lieutenant of the Royal Victorian Order (LVO) in the 2007 New Year Honours and promoted to Knight Commander of the same Order (KCVO) in the 2017 New Year Honours, both "for services to The Duke of Edinburgh’s Award Scheme".

He became a Freeman of the City of London in 2008.

In 2011, Hempleman-Adams was awarded the Lawrence Memorial Medal by the Royal Society for Asian Affairs in "recognition of outstanding support for the Society and geography". The following year, he was awarded as Honorary Fellow of the Royal Scottish Geographical Society (FRSGS). In 2013, Queen Elizabeth II presented him with the Polar Medal and bar for services to the UK in the field of polar research.

He received an Honorary Fellowship of the Royal Geographical Society (FRGS) in 2019, this in "recognition of outstanding support for the society and geography". Three years later, in 2022, the Society honored him again with its prestigious Founder's Medal "for enabling science through expeditions, and inspiring younger generations of geographers".

In 2025, Hempleman-Adams received the FAI Companion of Honour Diploma from the Fédération Aéronautique Internationale during the Royal Aero Club Awards held at the Royal Air Force Club in London, this in recognition for "his extraordinary contributions to ballooning, exploration, and the advancement of aviation".

== See also ==
- List of Mount Everest summiters by frequency
