= Kiku Nishizaki =

First Japanese woman aviator to obtain license for hydroplane

Kiku Nishizaki 西崎 キク
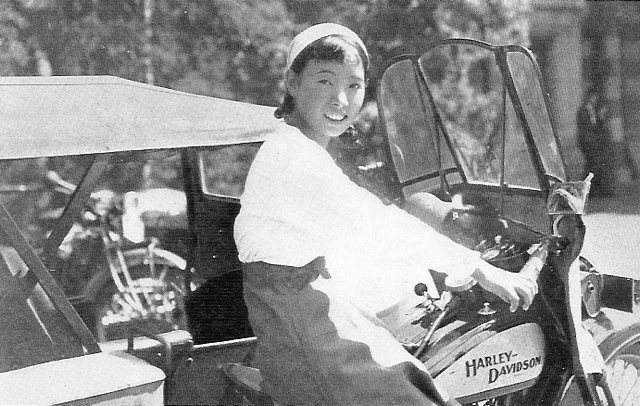
- Kiku Nishizaki
- Born: Kikuko Matsumoto; 2 November 1912; Kihoku, Ehime
- Died: 6 October 1979 (aged 66)
- Known for: the first generation woman water plane aviator in Japan
- Aviation career
- Famous flights: pioneer Japanese female aviator who flew across the Sea of Japan
- Flight license: second class aviator license in 1933

Kiku Nishizaki (西崎 キク, Nishizaki Kiku; née Kikuko Matsumoto; 2 November 1912 – 6 October 1979) was one of the two pioneer Japanese women aviators who made the first international flight across the Sea of Japan. Born Kiku Matsumoto in Kamisato, Saitama, her adventurous experiences became one of the models for the heroine of a very popular NHK Asadora TV drama Kumo no Jūtan (ja) in 1976.

== Early life ==
Kiku Nishizaki, née Matsumoto started working as an elementary school teacher after finishing Saitama Girls' Higher Normal School. On a school trip she took pupils and visited Ojima Airfield in Ota City, Gunma Prefecture and saw airplanes and aviation, and she was fascinated to retire the school soon after in 1931 and entered an aviation school.

== Aviation career ==
Kiku Nishizaki was licensed a second class seaplane aviator in 1933 and visited her hometown in October aboard an ichi-san type seaplane (一三式練習機 (ja)). An Ichi-san type, or 1-3 type K1Y2 seaplane was a single engine double-seated double wing training aircraft adopted by the Imperial Japanese Navy between World War I and World War II. As many as 100 of the planes were manufactured at Yokosuka Naval Air Technical Arsenal, Nakajima Aircraft Company, Kawanishi Aircraft Company and Watanabe Steel Foundry. Many were withheld from the private sector around 1935, and the plane was used at aviation schools and for business including newspapers.

She and Choko Mabuchi, two seaplane women aviators were selected as pilots in command to visit Manchukuo as ambassadors of goodwill. Two Salmanson 2A type land based aircraft were prepared, and each named for the aviators' first names: for Kiku (chrysanthemum), “Shiragiku” or white chrysanthemum, and Choko (butterfly), “Kichō” or yellow butterfly. Their flight across the Sea of Japan was during the time when Japanese news companies competed hard to publish news faster: two major incidents made them realize that airplane dramatically changed how they received photo negatives from remote area so that they would print the news faster than others. Both Asahi Shimbun and the Mainichi Shimbun had struggled to report the 1923 Great Kantō earthquake when they lost train services to carry photo negatives to the head office, which had been evacuated to Osaka.

In August 1929, a zeppelin visited Japan when Asahi defeated Mainichi; they predicted the navigation route, interviewed the German crews at the landing spot, and airlifted the photo negatives and printed the extra issue the evening of the landing. Mainichi published the news on the regular issue the next morning by misreading Zeppelin's aviation. As the government of Japan announced their plan to send both Nishizaki and Mabuchi fly to Manchukuo, Asahi had invested into a news aviation team with more staff and better aircraft than Mainichi, and Asahi succeeded to fly their reporters to Beijing and prepared to report the flight of Nishizaki and Mabuchi when they reached China in 1934.

Kiku Nishizaki and Choko Mabuchi left Tokyo Haneda airport to Manchukuo on 22 October, flew across the Sea of Japan, and landed at Xinjing, now Changchun airport on 4 November 1934. (Note: The aviation map of the flight has been preserved and published insert a booklet which documents Nishizaki's biography.) She and Mabuchi completed their mission when the latter touched down at Xinjing (Changchun) on 5 November.

Asahi reported the flight of Nishizaki (née Matsumoto) day by day when she arrived to China later than expected due rough weather and engine malfunction forced her to take emergency landing, until she touched down on the final destination Xinjing airport. At 10:10 am, 3 November, Nishizaki departed Sinŭiju and reached Fengtian East airport at 11:50 am to accomplish the final leg, then arriving at Xinjing the next day, she made good will flight around greater Xinjing, waiting for Mabuchi arriving on 5 November 1934. Nishizaki received the Harmon Trophy for her adventurous flight to Manchukuo in October. Nishizaki talked about the whole experience in a book.

Three years later and in July 1937, a second plan was announced to fly a woman aviator on long distance commemorating the municipal administration of then Toyohara, Karafuto Prefecture, Japan (presently Yuzhno-Sakhalinsk, Sakhalin Oblast, Russia). Selected for the mission, but Kiku Nishizaki failed and made an emergency sea landing at Tsugaru Strait, rescued by a cargo ship. The increasing public feelings trying to keep women away from maneuvering against her wish to continue flying, who volunteered to Army that she would transfer injured soldiers from the front to hospitals: Army was the largest stage for aviators (Note: In 1937, Asahi Newspaper completed a very long distance flight to reach from Japan to Europe aboard "Ki - 15", a prototype of Nakajima Ki-27 Army reconnaissance plane. The headquarters had arranged public poll naming it Kamikaze. Asahi flew it to reach London breaking the world record at less than 95 hour, and it proved that domestic manufactured aircraft were fast enough to fulfill military standards.) Her dream as an aviator was shattered.

== Later life ==
In the year 1935, she married Takeo Inoka and the couple joined settlers going to Manchukuo, where she worked as a teacher at the elementary school. However, Inaoka died in 1941, and she eventually met with Ryo Nishizaki and married him in 1943.

Nishizakis came back to Japan one year after the end of World War II in 1946 and went back to a farm settlement in their hometown Shichihongi. Kiku started farming in between teaching at schools for about 8 years. In this manner, she devoted herself for teaching pupils at school, and lead farmers how to exploit and manage farmlands, as well as compiled a record of her experience at the exploitation farms. She received the Minister of Agriculture and Forestry Award for those achievement in 1961. She died in 1979.

== Cultural references ==
In 2009, a Saitama newspaper ran a biography of Kinku Nishizaki in five parts starting on 18 May and completed on 10 June. The series included her portrait as a forerunner of a gender-equal society.

== Bibliography ==
- "〈白菊號〉奉天着 見事日満連絡を完成" [Shiragiku reached Mukden; the aviation between Japan and Manchukuo accomplished]. Asahi shinbun (in Japanese). 23 October 1934.
- "相次いで國都入り—女鳥人の銀翼 松本嬢は昨日成功 馬淵嬢はけふ壮挙を完成" [Two ladies on their silver wings touched down to the capital of Manchuria—Miss Matsumoto yesterday and Miss Mabuchi today]. Asahi shinbun (in Japanese). 5 November 1934.
- おわりよきもの すべてよし—異説ニッポン事始め物語 (証言を読んで) [All's well that ends well—the firsts of Japan]. 1975. OCLC 5176683798.
- Nishi, Miyuki (1975). 紅翼と拓魂の記 [Red wings and Soul] (in Japanese). Kiku Nishizaki. pp. 76–96. OCLC 703834761.
- Saitama Prefecture Board of Education, ed. (1998). "西崎キク (Nishizaki Kiku)". 埼玉人物事典 [Saitama biography of famous residents] (in Japanese). Saitama Prefecture. pp. 609–610. OCLC 675945136.
- 上里町史 通史編 下巻 [History of Kamisatomachi] (in Japanese). Vol. 2. Kamisatomachi City Office. 1998. p. 35. OCLC 47605191.
- "夢青き空から : 郷土の偉人西崎キク伝" [From the sky of blue dreams: Kiku Nishizaki, the heroine of our hometown] (in Japanese). Kamisatomachi Town Office. 2005. p. 11.
- 人はなぜ飛びたがるのか : 大空に挑んだ世界の"飛び屋"たち [Why people wish to fly the sky: the “flying” challengers] (in Japanese). 2008. OCLC 676635201.
- "日本初の女性水上飛行家・西崎キク物語（連載）" [Tale of NKiku ishizaki: the Japan's first female seaplane aviator (serial)]. Saitama newspaper (in Japanese). Vol. 1. 18 May 2009.
- Precious Stories of Saitama-ken (86 tales to remember) (in Japanese). Editorial group for “Precious Stories of Saitama-ken”. 2009.
- Advising group for gender equality, Kamisatomachi, ed. (2010). 教壇から大空へ、そして大地へ : 西崎キク [From classroom to the sky and to the earth: Kiku Nishizaki] (in Japanese). Kamisato chōroitsu shiryōkan (上里町立郷土資料館).
- 栗原彬; 吉見俊哉 (2015). ひとびとの精神史 (in Japanese). Vol. 1. Iwanami Shoten. ISBN 9784000288019.
- Matsumura, Yuriko. "女もすなる飛行機—第8回 後続の女性パイロットたち" [Even women want to fly airplanes]. NTT Web Magazine (in Japanese). NTT Publishing. Archived from the original on 13 September 2011.
