= Jacqueline Auriol =

French aviator (1917–2000)

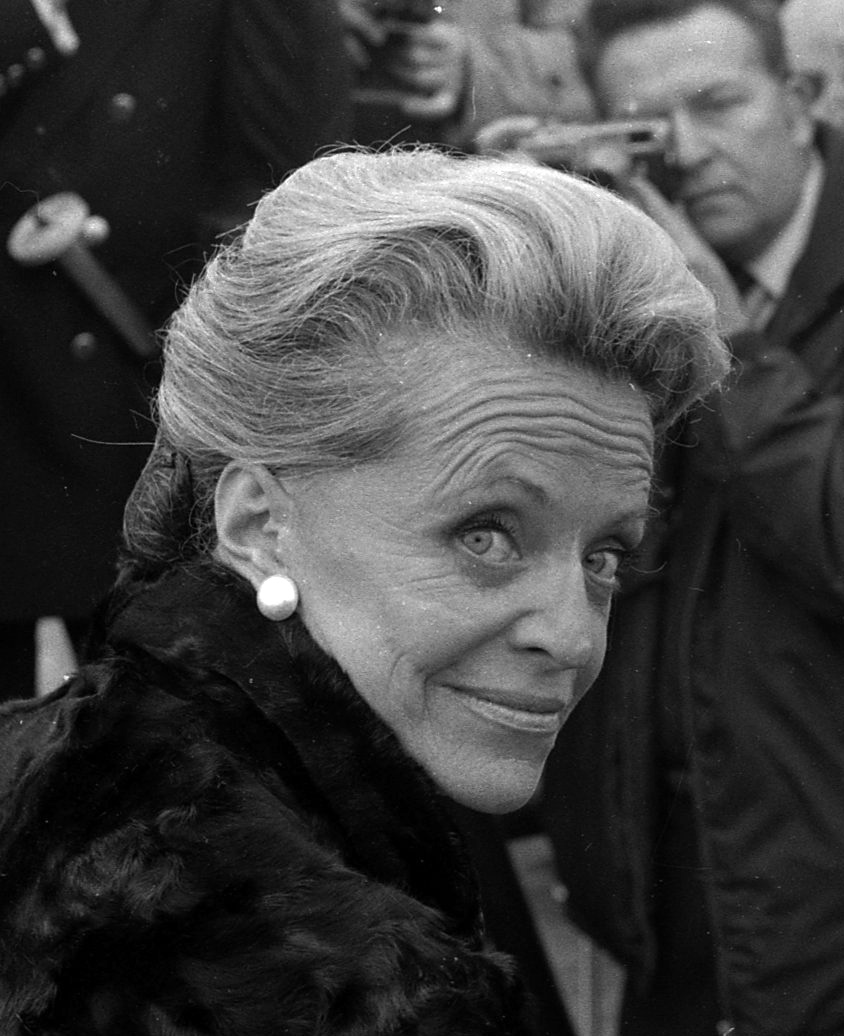
- Auriol in 1969, at the first flight of the Concorde
- Born: Jacqueline Marie-Thérèse Suzanne Douet; 5 November 1917; Challans, Vendée, France
- Died: 11 February 2000 (aged 82); Paris, France
- Education: Lycée Blanche-de-Castille; University of Nantes; École du Louvre
- Spouse: Paul Auriol (m. 1938; div. 1967) (m. 1987; died 1992)

Jacqueline Marie-Thérèse Suzanne Auriol (French pronunciation: [ʒaklin oʁjɔl]; née Douet; 5 November 1917 – 11 February 2000) was a French aviator who set several world speed records.

== Biography ==
I Live to Fly - Auriol's autobiography

Born in Challans, Vendée, the daughter of a wealthy shipbuilder, Edmond Pierre Douet, she graduated from the University of Nantes then she studied art at the École du Louvre in Paris.

In 1938, she married Paul Auriol, son of Vincent Auriol (who would later become President of France). During World War II, she worked against the German occupation of France by helping the French Resistance.

She took up flying in 1946, got her pilot's license in 1948 and became an accomplished stunt flier and test pilot. Auriol was severely injured in a crash of a SCAN 30 in which she was a passenger in 1949—many of the bones in her face were broken—and spent nearly three years in hospitals undergoing 33 reconstructive operations. To occupy her mind she studied algebra, trigonometry, aerodynamics, and other subjects necessary to obtain advanced pilot certification.

She earned a military pilot license in 1950 then qualified as one of the first female test pilots. She was among the first women to break the sound barrier and set five world speed records in the 1950s and 1960s.

On four occasions she was awarded the Harmon International Trophy by an American president in recognition of her aviation exploits. She once explained her passion for flying by saying: "I feel so happy when I'm flying. Perhaps it is the feeling of power, the pleasure of dominating a machine as beautiful as a Thoroughbred horse. Mingled with these basic joys is another less primitive feeling, that of a mission accomplished. Each time I set foot on an airfield, I sense with fresh excitement that this is where I belong."

In 1970, she published an autobiography, I Live to Fly, in both French and English.

Auriol and her husband divorced in 1967 and remarried in 1987. They had two children together, both boys. In 1983 she became a founding member of the French Académie de l'air et de l'espace.

== Records ==
Auriol set the following speed records:

- 12 May 1951 - Auriol set a Fédération Aéronautique Internationale- (FAI-) ratified average speed of 818.18 km/h (508.39 mph) flying a British-made Vampire over a 100-km (62.1-mile) closed circuit in France from Istres, outside Marseille, to Avignon and back to claim the women's world air speed record from its previous holder, Jacqueline Cochran of the United States.
- 21 December 1952 - Flying a Sud-Est Mistral (a French-built development of the Vampire with a Hispano-Suiza Nene engine), Auriol broke her own 1951 world speed record over a 100-km (62.1-mile) closed circuit by flying at 855.92 km/h (531.84 mph). The new record was set over the same 100-km (62.1-mile) closed course as in 1951, from Istres to Avignon and back.
- 31 May 1955 - Flying a Mystère IVN, Auriol broke the previous women's speed record over a 15/25-km (9.3/15.5-mile) straight course previously held by Jacqueline Cochrane with an FAI-ratified speed of 1,151 km/h (715.2 mph).
- 22 June 1962 - Flying a Dassault Mirage IIIC, Auriol achieved an FAI-ratified average speed of 1,850.2 km/h (1,149.7 mph) over the 100-km (62.1-mile) closed circuit at Istres, to reclaim the women's world air speed record in that category from Jacqueline Cochran.
- 14 June 1963 - Flying a Dassault Mirage IIIR, Auriol achieved an FAI-ratified average speed of 2,038.70 km/h (1,266.79 mph) over a 100-km (62.1-mile) closed circuit at Istres. It was her final attempt to break the women's air speed record over that distance, and she broke a record Jacqueline Cochran had set over the distance in May 1963.

On 1 June 1964, Cochran broke Auriol's June 1963 record, achieving an FAI-ratified average speed of 2,097.27 km/h (1,303.18 mph) over a 100-km (62.1-mile) closed circuit in a Lockheed F-104G Starfighter.

== Honours ==
- She was awarded four Harmon Trophies in 1951, 1952, 1953 and 1956.
- She was made Grand officier (Grand officer) of the Légion d'honneur.
- She was made grand-croix (Grand cross) of the Ordre national du Mérite in 1997.
- Honored as an Eagle in 1992.
- On 23 June 2003, France issued a €4.00 postage stamp in her honor.
- Named an honorary fellow of the Society of Experimental Test Pilots

== Sources ==
- I Live to Fly - Jacqueline Auriol. (1970) E.P. Dutton & Co.: New York; ISBN 0-525-13076-4

== See also ==
- Jacqueline Cochran
