= Ward Van Orman =

American balloonist (1894–1978)

- Born: Ward Tunte Van Orman; September 2, 1894; Lorain, Ohio, U.S.
- Died: March 11, 1978 (aged 83); Akron, Ohio, U.S.
- Known for: Balloon races of 1920s-1933
- Awards: Won the Gordon Bennett Cup in ballooning in 1926, 1929, 1930
- Aviation career
- First flight: 1918
- Flight license: 1918

Ward Tunte Van Orman (September 2, 1894 – March 11, 1978) was an American engineer, inventor and balloonist. A lifelong employee of Goodyear Tire and Rubber Company credited with invention of Goodyear's inflatable life raft and self-sealing fuel tank, Van Orman set an unprecedented record of winning five annual National Balloon Races (including the first ever Litchfield Trophy issued by Goodyear's Paul Litchfield in 1925), participating in ten and winning three International Gordon Bennett Races (1926, 1929, 1930).

== Biography ==
Born in Lorain, Ohio, Van Orman was inclined to science and mechanics since childhood. At school he managed to save enough cash to enroll in Case School of Applied Science. In 1917 he graduated with a perfect 4.0 GPA and joined the staff of Goodyear in Akron, Ohio; in 1918 he qualified for a balloon and airship pilot's license. His first invention, a leakproof cover for gasoline tanks, was filed in 1921 and patented in 1928; eventually, he developed reliable self-sealing fuel tanks. Later in life, Van Orman (who preferred to be called simply "Van") considered his inventions, and not the record flights, his greatest accomplishments.

During the 1925 International Race Van Orman performed world's first emergency night landing of a balloon on a deck of a steamship at high seas. The race took off June 9, 1925 at Brussels; at first the Goodyear III balloon floated over France towards Spain but then a change in wind dragged it into Atlantic Ocean. Van Orman's partner, Carl Wollam, desperate about inevitable death by drowning, intoxicated himself with cognac and attempted suicide at least twice. As Van Orman struggled to restrain Wollam from jumping overboard, he noticed navigation lights of a ship that turned out to be a small German freighter, Vaterland. Van Orman flashed morse code messages to the captain, who assisted the landing by turning on all available lighting and steering the ship towards the descending balloon. The balloon safely landed on Vaterland's forward deck. Van Orman and captain Rudolf Norman remained friends for life. This flight was the longest in the 1925 International Race, but Van Orman was disqualified and denied the Gordon Bennett trophy according to the race rules requiring landing to be on land. Fifty years after this event, Van Orman was still bitterly hurt by the disqualification: "the memory of that unfair decision never has grown dim".

May 30, 1928. Van Orman (left) and Walter Morton check instruments prior to the fatal flight that killed Morton

Van Orman picked a new partner, Walter Morton, and easily won the 1926 National Race, qualifying for this year's International Race. He won the 1926 Gordon Bennett Trophy flying from Antwerp to Solvesborg in Sweden. The win automatically qualified them to the next year's International Race, where Orman and Morton came third.

The National Race of 1928, held on May 30 in Pittsburgh, turned out a disaster. Lightning strikes downed three aircraft, including Van Orman's. A direct thunderbolt killed Morton instantly and ignited hydrogen in the gas bag. The balloon's basket fell from three thousand feet, supported by a "parachute" of what remained of its gas bag. Van Orman, unconscious in his basket, survived the impact without serious injuries.

I was looking directly at the flash... hardly thicker than my finger ... it passed within two feet of my eyes. I had time after the flash to look up over the edge of the 'rain dodger' we had spread across the top of the basket and note that the bottom of the bag apparently was still intact. Probably it was two or three seconds after the flash before the concussion knocked me unconscious. How high we were, I don't know.
When I came to, my head was lying outside the basket, with rain falling on my head. I felt Mortom beside me...
Van Orman, 1928

Van Orman survived other, less inspiring incidents: once he was assaulted by an unidentified man, allegedly hired by one of Van Orman's competitors; on another occasion during prohibition he landed a balloon in the middle of an illegal distillery operation, and was confronted by bootleggers wielding shotguns who mistook him for a federal agent. During the 1933 National Race Van Orman's balloon flew deep into Canadian forests. He and his partners wandered through the wilderness, starving; back at home they were already considered dead. Finally, they reached a telephone line running through the forest; they chopped down a pole, severing the line, expecting that a repair crew will eventually locate them. After this incident Van Orman, a single parent (his first wife died in 1932), quit balloon racing.

After retiring from active ballooning sport Van Orman served as a researcher with Goodyear until 1962. His works ranged from fuel tanks to developing waterproof fabrics for diving suits and airtight zippers for pressure suits. In retirement Van Orman, a shriner, travelled across the country as a motivational speaker, periodically flying hot air balloons until the final year or two of his life. He died of a stroke in 1978 and was buried at Rose Hill cemetery in Akron, Ohio.

Van Orman authored an autobiography, The wizard of the winds (ISBN 0878390324), published posthumously in 1978.

== Sources ==
- Vaeth, Joseph Gordon (2005). They sailed the skies: U.S. Navy balloons and the airship program. Naval Institute Press. ISBN 978-1-59114-914-9.
- Elliott, Michael (2009). "Akron's Monarch of the Skies" (PDF). Akron-Summit Public Library.
