= Antoni Janusz =

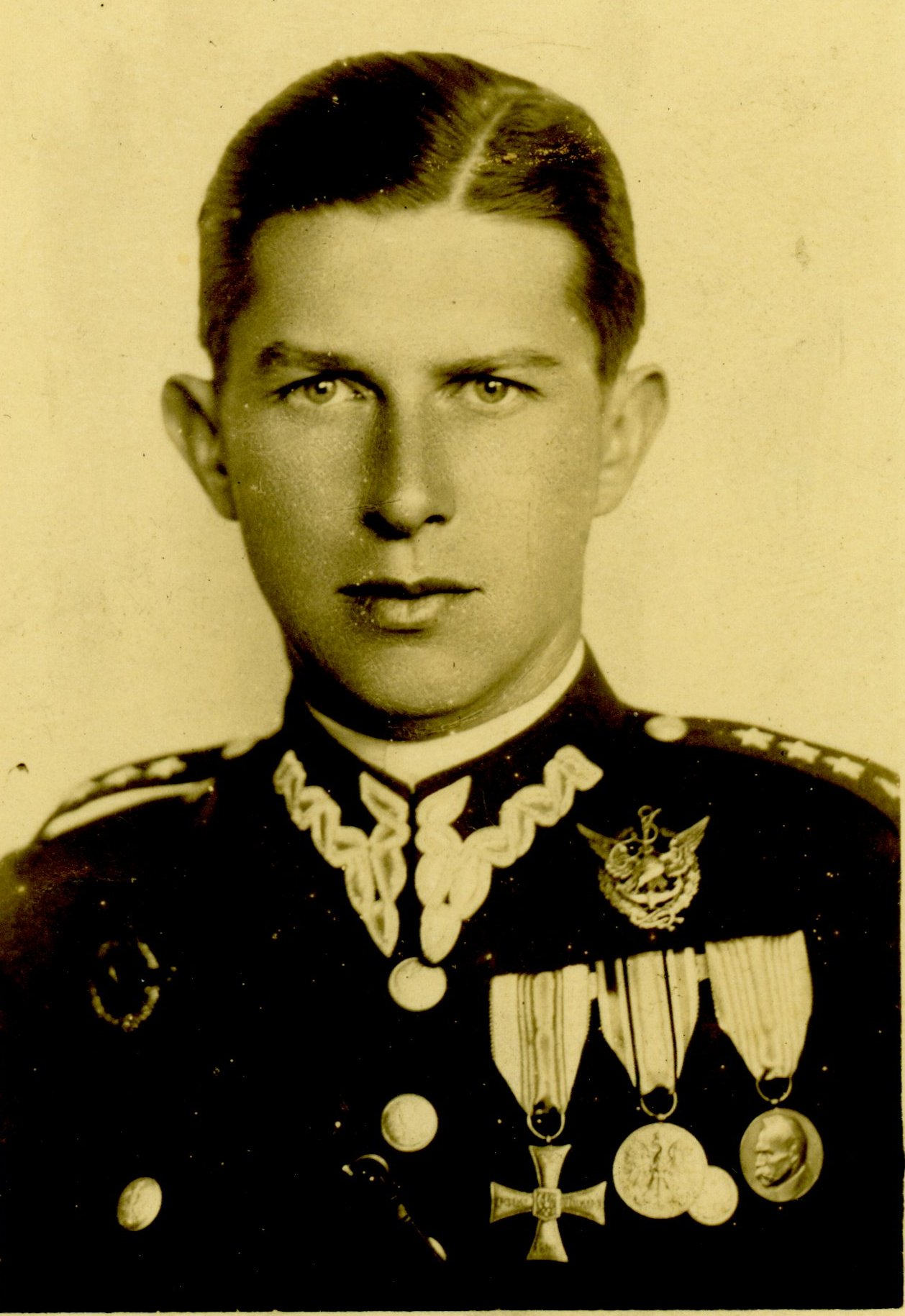
- Kapitan Antoni Janusz in the year 1934
- Born: 30 January 1902; Leszno (Lissa, Province of Posen, German Empire, modern Poland)
- Died: 28 August 2000 (aged 98) London, England
- Allegiance: Poland; United Kingdom
- Branch: Polish Army French Air Force Royal Air Force
- Service years: 1919–1953
- Rank: lieutenant colonel
- Conflicts: Polish-Soviet War, Battle of Warsaw (1920), Polish Defensive War, World War II
- Awards: Polonia Restituta; Cross of Valour; Gold Cross of Merit; Bronze Cross of Merit; Air Force Medal for War 1939-1945 (four time); Medal for 1918-1921 War; Restitution 10th Anniversary Medal; Defence Medal, War Medal 1939-1945; Médaille commémorative de la Guerre 1939-1945 (France)
- Other work: British Balloon and Airship Club, Vice President 1990-91

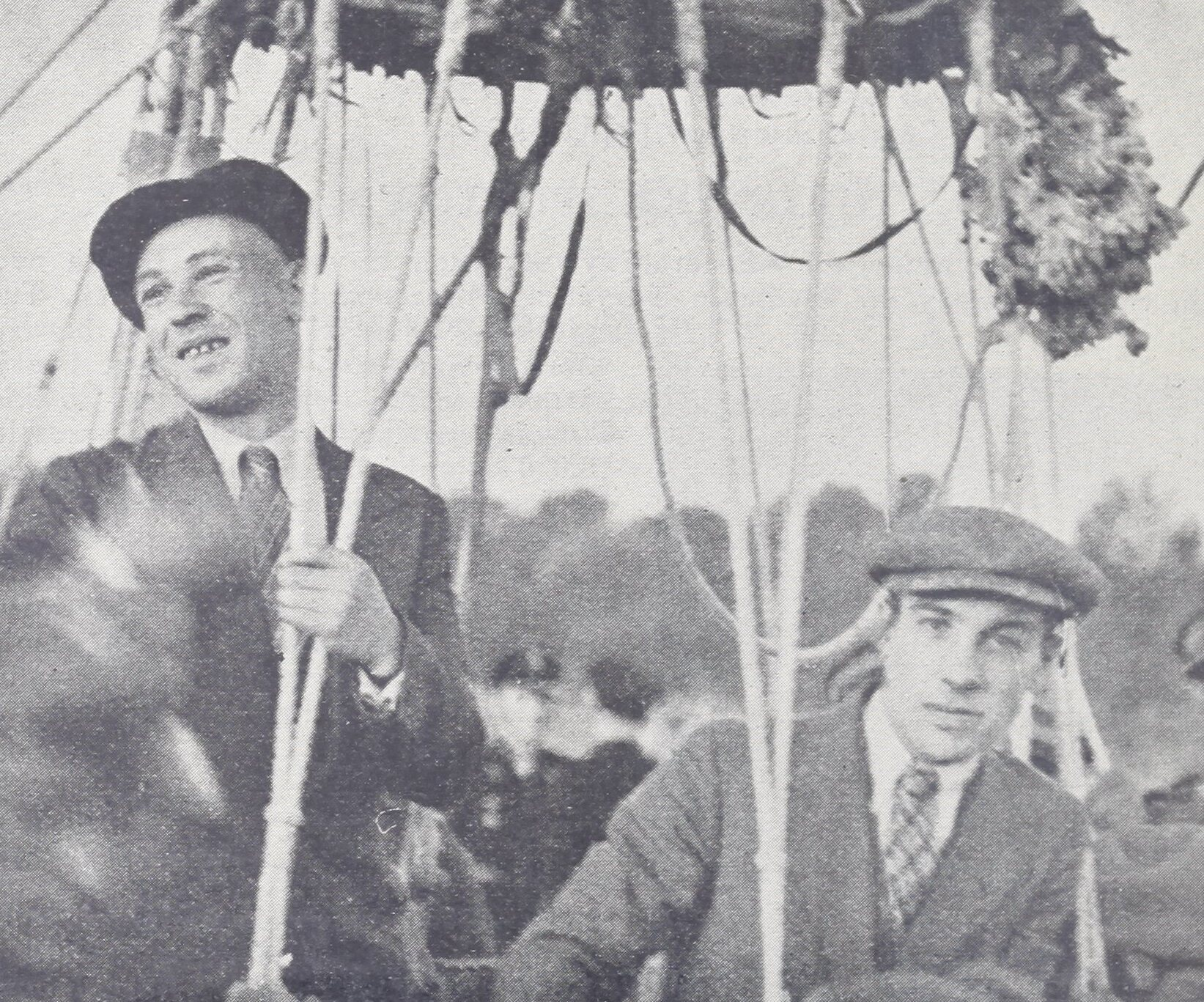
Zbigniew Burzyński (on the left) and Antoni Janusz (on the right).

Antoni Janusz (30 January 1902 – 28 August 2000) was a Polish sportsman, soldier and pilot.

Janusz was an officer in the Polish Air Force (1919–1947) and in the British Air Force (1947–1953), later risen to the rank of lieutenant colonel. Antoni Janusz served in the Polish-Soviet War and World War II. He was distinguished with several awards, Polish, French and British.

As a balloonist, Antoni Janusz participated in six Gordon Bennett races and won in 1938.

== Biography ==
Antoni Janusz was born in Leszno Wielkopolskie in 1902. In 1907 his family moved to Jarocin where he finished Queen Jadwiga's Primary School. Further education was Karol Marcinkowski's Gymnasium in Poznań and then School of Aeronautics. He was commissioned as a second lieutenant on 28 September 1919, being one of the youngest officers of Polish Army. Later, he was ordered to the 14th Infantry Division (Poland) as a Kite Balloonist and served in the Polish-Soviet War. At Russian Front he participated in Bobrujsk Lodgement Battle. During the Battle of Warsaw Antoni Janusz was a Company Commander.

After the end of Polish-Soviet War Antoni Janusz remained an officer of the Polish Army. He was assigned to the 1st Balloon Battalion in Toruń. Just at the beginning of World War II, he was transferred to the Polish Military Ministry as a duty officer at Warsaw Airport. He also trained balloon pilots and participated in military balloon construction projects during his work in Legionowo, near Warsaw. He also took up aircraft piloting training.

In the period before World War II Antoni Janusz was engaged in ballooning sport development in Poland. He was its propagator. He participated in most events of Polish Ballooning. In the 1930s he was classified among the leaders of world ballooning.

On 25 October 1925 Antoni Janusz won the First Domestic Balloon Cup (Poland). Together with lieutenant Jan Zakrzewski they reached the distance of 142 km in time of 2 hr 47 min in balloon Poznań.

Starting from 1927, Antoni Janusz began participating in international balloon cups. His first important success was the second place in 1929 Poland Cup. He started in balloon "Gdynia" reaching the distance of 354 km in time of 22 hours. In years 1932–1938 he regularly participated in Gordon Bennett Balloon-Races. His greatest triumph was winning it in 1938 with a distance of 1692 km and time of 37 hr 47 min.

On 17 September 1939 (when Soviets attacked Poland) Antoni Janusz together with his unit retreated respectively to Romania, then across to Greece, then Tobruk and Casablanca, finally reaching France in spring 1940. There he joined the French Air Force serving as a liaison officer. Finally, after France's capitulation, he moved to Scotland where he joined the No. 301 Polish Bomber Squadron as a pilot.

In 1942 Antoni Janusz was injured. During his hospitalisation and convalescence the 301 Squadron was disbanded and its crews were then attached to the No. 138 RAF Squadron as the RAF 301 Special Duties Flight Squadron. From this moment until 1953, Antoni Janusz became a RAF soldier. He trained pilots and served as a liaison officer (knowing seven European languages).

While working at the Air Ministry, Antoni Janusz met Jean Oilier, whom he married in 1949. He settled in London. His interests were quite broad: he was an amateur mathematician, philosopher and astronomer. The Gordon Bennett Balloon-Races were officially reinstated in the year 1983 and Antoni Janusz had an honour to decorate the winners: Stefan Maknè and Ireneusz Cieślak from Poland.

Antoni Janusz died on 28 August 2000 in London. According to his last wish the urn with his ashes was buried in the family tomb in Christ the King churchyard in his native town Jarocin.

== Antoni Janusz participation in Gordon Bennett Balloon-Races ==
Date	Starting point	Position	Crew	Balloon name	Time [hh:mm]	Distance [km]
25 September 1932	Basel (Switzerland)	4	Władysław Pomaski, Antoni Janusz	SP-AHX Polonia	24:00	1,181.00
23 September 1934	Warsaw (Poland)	4	Antoni Janusz, Ignacy Wawszczak	SP-AMY Polonia II	22:04	1,138.00
16 September 1935	Warsaw (Poland)	2	Antoni Janusz, Ignacy Wawszczak	SP-ANA Warszawa II	46:52	1,567.13
30 August 1936	Warsaw (Poland)	2	Antoni Janusz, Stanisław Brenk	SP-BCU LOPP	38:02	1,534.28
20 June 1937	Brussels (Belgium)	2	Antoni Janusz, Leszek Krzyszkowski	SP-AMY Polonia II	46:30	1,364.00
11 September 1938	Liège (Belgium)	1	Antoni Janusz, Franciszek Janik	SP-BCU LOPP	37:47	1,692.00

== Bibliography ==
- Robert Recks: JANUSZ, Antoni (en.). W: Who's Who of Ballooning [on-line]. ballooninghistory.com > Affiliated Site: Who's Who of Ballooning.
- Anthony Smith: Antoni Janusz (en.). theguardian.com > News > Obituaries [on-line], 2000-09-14.
- Jerzy R. Konieczny, Tadeusz Malinowski: "Mala encyklopedia lotnikow polskich" (in Polish), Warszawa 1983, ISBN 83-206-0337-4.
- Stanisław Brenk: Balonem "LOPP" nad Morze Białe (in Polish), Nakładem Zarządu Głównego Ligii Obrony Powietrznej i Przeciwgazowej, Warszawa 1937.
