= Richard Abruzzo =

American balloonist

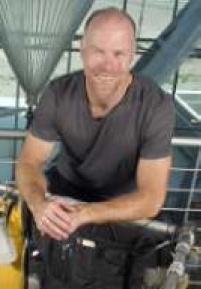
- Abruzzo on the balcony of the Anderson-Abruzzo Albuquerque International Balloon Museum
- Born: May 19, 1963
- Died: September 29, 2010 (aged 47); Adriatic Sea
- Cause of death: Balloon accident
- Resting place: Gate of Heaven Cemetery Albuquerque, New Mexico
- Occupation: Real estate business
- Known for: Balloonist who with Dr. Carol Rymer Davis won the 2004 Gordon Bennett Gas Balloon Race and the 2003 America's Challenge Gas Race
- Parents: Ben Abruzzo (father); Patricia Ann "Pat" Steen Abruzzo (mother)

Richard Abruzzo (May 19, 1963 – c. September 29, 2010) was a champion American balloonist who with Carol Rymer Davis won the 2003 America's Challenge Gas Balloon Race and the 2004 Gordon Bennett Cup.

== Background ==
Abruzzo was born on May 19, 1963, to Ben Abruzzo and Patricia Ann "Pat" Steen Abruzzo. In his home town of Albuquerque, New Mexico, his business enterprises included real estate and ski lifts. The ballooning accomplishments of his father Ben, who was part of the balloon crews to first cross the Atlantic Ocean in the Double Eagle II and the Pacific Ocean in the Double Eagle V, encouraged Richard's lifetime of balloon accomplishments. In 1992 Richard flew the first gas balloon from North America to Africa breaking the distance record previously held by his father. He was a five-time champion in the America's Challenge Gas Balloon Race winning in 1995, 1997, 2002, 2003, and 2004. The National Aeronautic Association awarded Richard Abruzzo the Harmon Trophy as the year's outstanding aeronaut in 2001, 2003, and 2005. The 2001 Harmon Trophy was for the longest solo flight from Albuquerque, New Mexico, to Crawfordville, Georgia. The 2003 Harmon Trophy was for the first solo gas balloon transcontinental flight from San Diego to the Georgia coast.

== Disappearance and death ==
Richard Abruzzo and Rymer Davis were lost at sea on September 29, 2010, while competing in the 54th Gordon Bennett Cup. Five days after liftoff from Bristol, England they encountered a severe thunderstorm and were lost at sea. Their bodies were found off the coast of Italy in the Adriatic Sea on December 6, 2010.

== See also ==
- List of people who disappeared mysteriously at sea
