= Carol Rymer Davis =

American balloonist (1944–2010)

Carol Ann Rymer Davis
- Born: Carol Ann Rymer; November 28, 1944; Denver, Colorado, U.S.
- Died: September 29, 2010 (aged 65); Adriatic Sea
- Occupations: Radiologist, physician, ballonist
- Known for: First women to win the Gordon Bennet Cup for ballooning in 2004

Carol Ann Rymer Davis (November 28, 1944 – c. September 29, 2010) was an American balloonist and radiologist. In 2004, she was the first woman to win the Gordon Bennet Cup for ballooning with fellow crewman Richard Abruzzo. For this historic win, they were awarded the 2005 Harmon Trophy. She was lost at sea on September 29, 2010, over the Adriatic Sea. Her body, along with that of Abruzzo, was found off the coast of Italy in the Adriatic Sea on December 6, 2010.

== Early life and education ==
Rymer Davis was born in Denver, Colorado on November 28, 1944, the daughter of Drs. Charles and Marion Rymer. She graduated from Colorado College with a bachelor's degree, and from the University of Colorado Health Sciences Center with a medical degree. She completed her residency in Albuquerque at the Lovelace Medicine Center.

== Career ==
She served 22 years in the United States Army Reserve as a flight surgeon and retired as a colonel in 2001. She received a Meritorious Service Medal and was an Honor Graduate of the Expert Field Medical Badge School at Fort Carson.

She worked in Albuquerque, New Mexico and then was a radiologist, specializing in reading breast mammograms, in Denver, Colorado at the time of her death. She was a partner at Diversified Radiology.

== Ballooning ==
Davis became interested in hot air ballooning in 1972 with her husband. She was licensed to fly hot-air balloons in 1973 and two years later was licensed to fly gas balloons.

She was awarded the 1981 Diploma Montgolfier. She was an instructor at the Albuquerque Aerostat Ascension Association Ground School, from 1982 to 1986. She participated in five Gordon Bennet Cup races. Marie Goldschmidt had been the first woman to enter the competition in 1913, but it was not until 2004, that Rymer Davis became the first woman to win a Gordon Bennett race. With Richard Abruzzo she received the Harmon Trophy in 2005.

On September 25, 2010, Abruzzo and Rymer Davis lifted off from Bristol, England during the Gordon Bennett race. They traveled for 1,092 miles (1,757 km) when contact was lost with the tracker device on their balloon on September 29, 2010. Abruzzo, who had been communicating with weather people, lost contact with them. The Brindisi air traffic control in Italy also lost contact with them. Radar showed that the balloon descended towards the sea at 50 miles an hour. The balloon had survival equipment and multiple forms of communication devices. Boats and aircraft engaged in a search and rescue operation in and over the Adriatic Sea, where there had been thunderstorms at the time that they went missing. Rescue efforts by the Croatian coastal aircraft crews, U.S. Navy aircraft, and Italian coast guard continued for five days. In December, their bodies were found by fishermen off the coast near Vieste on December 6.

== Personal life ==
She married John C. Davis IV in 1968; they raised two daughters. Her husband is a balloonist.

She climbed all fourteeners in Colorado by her 18th birthday. She was also an avid skier and won several races.

== See also ==
- List of people who disappeared mysteriously at sea
