= Piccard family =

Swiss family of explorers and balloonists

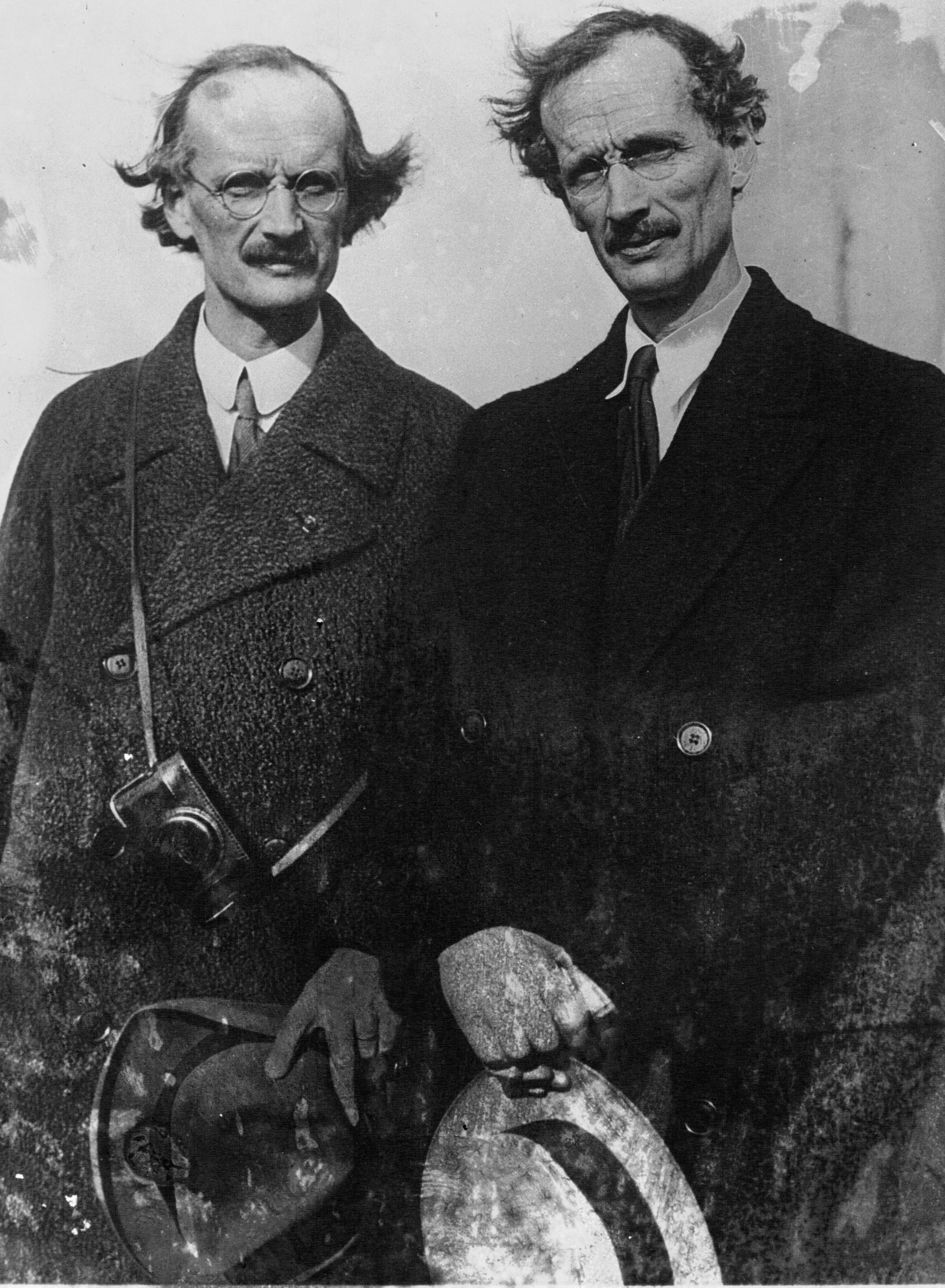
Auguste and Jean Piccard in 1933

The Piccard family are a Swiss family of adventurers, explorers and scientists. They collectively have broken several world records in exploration, particularly with balloons. The Star Trek character Jean-Luc Picard was named in honour of this family.

Members include:

- Jules Piccard, a chemist and professor of chemistry
  - Auguste Piccard, a physicist, aeronaut, balloonist, hydronaut
    - Jacques Piccard, a hydronaut
      - Bertrand Piccard, an aeronaut, psychiatrist and balloonist
  - Jean Felix Piccard, an organic chemist, aeronaut, and balloonist
  - Jeannette Piccard, wife of Jean Felix, an aeronaut and balloonist
    - Don Piccard, a balloonist

== See also ==
- Picard, Piccard, Pickard, Picardi, Piccardi, Picardo, Piccardo, Picart, Piccart, Pycard
