= Pichard =

Pichard is a French surname. Notable people with the surname include:

- Françoise Pichard (born 1941), French cartoonist and illustrator
- Georges Pichard (1920–2003), French comics artist
- Raymond Pichard French Priest and television presenter
- William Pichard (1897–1957), Swiss bobsledder

== See also ==
- Picard/Piccard/Pickard, Picardi/Piccardi, Picardo/Piccardo, Pichard/Pichardo, Picart/Piccart, Pycard
