= Pichardo =

Pichardo is a Spanish surname. Notable people with the surname include:

- Adolfo Pichardo (born 1939), Cuban pianist, conductor, arranger, and composer
- Adriana Pichardo, Venezuelan politician
- Alfonso Pichardo (born 1973), Mexican musician and singer
- Eligio Pichardo (1929–1984), Dominican Republic painter
- Fausto B. Pichardo, Dominican American police officer and administrator
- Hipólito Pichardo (born 1969), Dominican Republic baseball player
- Ignacio Pichardo Pagaza (1935–2020), Mexican politician
- Juan Pichardo (born 1966), Dominican American politician
- Julio Pichardo (born 1990), Cuban footballer
- Miguel Angel Pichardo (born 1980), Dominican Republic basketball player
- Olivia Pichardo (born 2004), American baseball player
- Pedro Pichardo (born 1993), Cuban-Portuguese triple jumper
- Rita Pichardo (born 1970), Cuban tennis player
- Victor M. Pichardo (born 1984), American politician

== See also ==
- Picard/Piccard/Pickard, Picardi/Piccardi, Picardo/Piccardo, Pichard/Pichardo, Picart/Piccart, Pycard
