= Picard =

Picard may refer to:

== Places ==
- Picard, Quebec, Canada
- Picard, California, United States
- Picard (crater), a lunar impact crater in Mare Crisium

== People and fictional characters ==
- Picard (name), a list of people and fictional characters with the surname
- Picards, a religious sect in the fifteenth century

== Other uses ==
- Star Trek: Picard, a television series focusing on the character of Jean-Luc Picard
- Picard language, a language spoken in France and Belgium
- Picard (satellite), an orbiting solar observatory built by CNES
- Picard (grape), an alternative name for several wine grape varieties
- TSS Duke of Cumberland or Picard, a steamship that operated between Tilbury and Dunkirk from 1927 to 1936
- Picard Surgelés, French retailer of frozen foods

== See also ==
- Berger Picard, French breed of dog of the herding group of breeds
- Les Fatals Picards, a French band
- MusicBrainz Picard, a cross platform tagger for MusicBrainz database
- Picard group, a mathematical object describing the self-isomorphisms of a ringed space
- Picard horn, a cone shaped formation that represents the 'shape' of the universe according to the Wilkinson Microwave Anisotropy Probe
- Piccard, surname
- Piccardo, surname
- Pickard (disambiguation)
