= Picart =

Picart is a French surname. Notable people with the surname include:

- Bernard Picart (1673–1733), French engraver
- Caroline Joan S. Picart, American academic
- Cathérine Picart, French biophysicist and bioengineer
- Charles Picart Le Doux, French painter
- Jean-Michel Picart (c. 1600–1682), Flemish still life painter and art dealer

== See also ==
- Picard, Piccard, Pickard, Picardi, Piccardi, Picardo, Piccardo, Picart, Piccart, Pycard
- Walter Garnet Picart Chambers or Walter P. Chambers (1908–2003), Antiguan composer
