= Piccard =

Piccard is a French surname, a variant of Picard.

== Notable people with this name ==
Members of the Swiss Piccard family

- Auguste Piccard (1884–1962), physicist, balloonist, hydronaut
- Bertrand Piccard (born 1958), psychiatrist, balloonist, and solar plane pilot
- Don Piccard (1926–2020), balloonist
- Jacques Piccard (1922–2008), hydronaut
- Jean Piccard (1884–1963), organic chemist, balloonist
- Jeannette Piccard (1895–1981), balloonist, teacher, scientist, priest

Other notable Piccards

- Eulalie Piccard (fl. 1920s–1940s) Swiss-Russian novelist
- Franck Piccard (born 1965), French skier
- Ian Piccard (born 1968), French skier
- Jeff Piccard (born 1976), French alpine skier
- Jules Piccard (1840–1933), Swiss chemist
- Leila Piccard (born 1971), French skier
- Sophie Piccard (1904–1990), Swiss-Russian mathematician
- Ted Piccard (born 1978), French skier

== See also ==
- Picard, Piccard, Pickard, Picardi, Piccardi, Picardo, Piccardo, Picart, Piccart, Pycard
- Auguste Piccard submarine
