= Paul Hermann Müller =

20th-century Swiss chemist and Nobel laureate

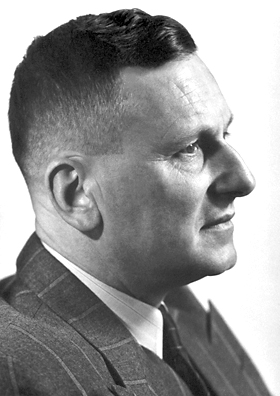
- Born: 12 January 1899; Olten, Solothurn, Switzerland
- Died: 13 October 1965 (aged 66); Basel, Switzerland
- Education: Universität Basel
- Known for: Insecticidal applications of DDT
- Awards: Nobel Prize in Physiology or Medicine (1948)
- Scientific career
- Fields: Chemistry
- Workplaces: J. R. Geigy AG
- Doctoral advisor: Hans Rupe

Paul Hermann Müller, also known as Pauly Mueller (12 January 1899 – 13 October 1965), was a Swiss chemist who received the 1948 Nobel prize in Physiology or Medicine for his 1939 discovery of insecticidal qualities and use of DDT in the control of vector diseases such as malaria and yellow fever.

== Early life and education ==
Müller was born on 12 January 1899 in Olten, Solothurn, to Gottlieb and Fanny (née Leypoldt or Leypold) Müller. He was the oldest of four children. His father worked for the Swiss Federal Railways and the family first moved to Lenzburg in Aargau and then to Basel.

Müller went to the local primary school (volksschule) and later to the lower and upper "realschule". In that time, he had a small laboratory where he developed photographic plates and built radio equipment.

In 1916, he left school due to bad grades and started to work as a laboratory assistant at Dreyfus. The next year he became an assistant chemist in the scientific-industrial laboratory of the electrical plant of Lonza AG. Returning to school in 1918, he obtained his secondary school diploma in 1919 and entered the University of Basel in the same year.

At the University of Basel he studied chemistry (with a minor in botany and physics) and started to study inorganic chemistry under Friedrich Fichter. In 1922, he continued his studies in the organic chemistry lab of Hans Rupe. While working for Rupe as assistant, he received his PhD writing a dissertation entitled Die chemische und elektrochemische Oxidation des as. m-Xylidins und seines Mono- und Di-Methylderivates (The Chemical and Electrochemical Oxidation of Asymmetrical m-Xylidene and its Mono- and Di-methyl Derivatives) in 1925. He graduated summa cum laude.

== Early work at Geigy ==
On 25 May 1925 Müller began working as a research chemist for the dye division of J. R. Geigy AG in Basel. His first research topics at Geigy concerned synthetic and plant-derived dyes and natural tanning agents. This work led to the production of the synthetic tanning agents Irgatan G, Irgatan FL and Irgatan FLT.

In 1935, Geigy began research on moth- and plant-protection agents and Müller was specifically interested in plant protection. He said that his love for plants and nature in general, which led him to choose botany as a minor subject at university, brought him to think about plant protection. Specifically, he wanted to start synthesizing chemical plant protection agents himself. In 1937, he patented a technique for synthesizing novel rhodanide- and cyanate-based compounds which showed bactericide and insecticide activity. He then developed the product Graminone, a seed disinfectant which was safer than the mercury-based disinfectants at the time.

== Synthesis of DDT ==
After his success with tanning agents and disinfectants, Müller was assigned to develop an insecticide. "At that time," according to The World of Anatomy and Physiology, "the only available insecticides were either expensive natural products or synthetics ineffective against insects; the only compounds that were both effective and inexpensive were arsenic compounds, which were just as poisonous to human beings and other mammals."

During the course of his research, Müller found that insects absorbed chemicals differently than mammals. This led him to believe it likely that there are chemicals toxic exclusively to insects. He sought to "synthesize the ideal contact insecticide—one which would have a quick and powerful toxic effect upon the largest possible number of insect species while causing little or no harm to plants and warm-blooded animals." He also made it his goal to create an insecticide that was long-lasting and cheap to produce, along with a high degree of chemical stability.

In embracing this goal, Müller was motivated by two events. The first of these was a major food shortage in Switzerland, which underscored the need for a better way to control the infestation of crops by insects. The second was the typhus epidemic in Russia, which was the most extensive and lethal such epidemic in history. He began his search for his insecticide in 1935.

He studied all the data he could find on the subject of insecticides, decided which chemical properties the kind of insecticide he was in search of would exhibit, and set out to find a compound that would suit his purposes. Müller spent four years searching and failed 349 times before, in September 1939, he found the compound he was looking for. He placed a fly in a cage laced with one particular compound, and short while later, the fly died.

The compound he had placed in the cage was dichlorodiphenyltrichloroethane (DDT), or, more precisely, 1,1,1-trichloro-2,2-bis(4-chlorophenyl)ethane, which a Viennese pharmacologist named Othmar Zeidler had first synthesized in 1874. Zeidler, while publishing a paper about his synthesis, had not investigated the properties of the new compound, and had thus failed to recognize its extraordinary value as an insecticide.

Müller quickly realized that DDT was the chemical he had been searching for. Tests of DDT by the Swiss government and the U.S. Department of Agriculture confirmed its effectiveness against the Colorado potato beetle. Further tests demonstrated its astonishing effectiveness against a wide range of pests, including the mosquito, louse, flea, and sandfly, which, respectively, spread malaria, typhus, the plague, and various tropical diseases.

== Application of DDT ==
After taking out a Swiss patent on DDT in 1940 (a U.K. patent followed in 1942 and patents in the U.S. and Australia in 1943), Geigy began to market two DDT-based products, a 5% dust called Gesarol spray insecticide and a 3% dust called Neocid dust insecticide. The name DDT was first employed by the British Ministry of Supply in 1943, and the product was added to U.S. Army supply lists in May of the same year. It was also in 1943 that the first practical tests of DDT as a residual insecticide against adult vector mosquitoes were carried out. The next year, in Italy, tests were performed in which residual DDT was applied to the interior surfaces of all habitations and outbuildings of a community to test its effect on Anopheles vectors and malaria incidence.

== Later scientific career ==
Müller became Geigy's Deputy Director of Scientific Research on Substances for Plant Protection in 1946. In 1948 he was awarded the Nobel Prize in Physiology and Medicine, "for his discovery of the high efficiency of DDT as a contact poison against several arthropods." The fact that he was accorded this honour even though he was neither a physician nor a medical researcher reflected the immense impact that DDT had had in the fight against human disease. The Nobel Committee said: "DDT has been used in large quantities in the evacuation of concentration camps, of prisons and deportees. Without any doubt, the material has already preserved the life and health of hundreds of thousands." In 1951, Müller was one of seven Nobel Laureates who attended the 1st Lindau Nobel Laureate Meeting.

In addition to the 1948 Nobel Prize in physiology or medicine, Müller received an honorary doctorate from the University of Thessalonica in Greece in recognition of DDT's impact on the Mediterranean region. He retired from Geigy in 1961, continuing his research in a home laboratory.

== Personal life ==
In high school, Müller was only an average student. His grades suffered because he spent all his free time in his little home laboratory performing elementary experiments. In high school and college, Müller was often mocked by his peers being called, "The Ghost," due to his thin and pale appearance.

Müller married Friedel Rüegsegger in 1927 and had two sons and one daughter. His wife took charge of the household and raised their two sons and daughter so that Müller could concentrate on chemistry.

In his free time, Müller enjoyed the nature in the Swiss Alps and in the Swiss Jura where he owned a small holiday home, allowing him to resume his longtime interest in botany. Furthermore, he owned a small fruit farm that he regularly tended to. Müller often relaxed while gardening, photographing mountain wildflowers, and taking the children on early morning nature walks. Moreover, Müller and his wife often enjoyed playing flute and piano duets from Gluck's Orfeo ed Euridice.

Reading on the weekends in the mountains, Müller immersed himself in the science of plant protection and pest control. This fascination resulted in his research on pesticides at Geigy, and sequentially the discovery of DDT's pesticidal properties.

Müller was regarded as independent, a lone wolf. His daughter, Margaretha, called him an Eigenbrötler: one "who makes his own bread". He was determined and persistent in all aspects of his life, having learned a great deal from his college mentor Fichter.

Müller died in the early morning of 13 October 1965 in Basel, after a short illness, surrounded by family.

== Honors ==
Müller received many honors in his life, among them the Nobel Prize in Physiology or Medicine. Specifically Greece honored him for the near elimination of malaria in the country as a result of his discovery. In 1963, he was invited to Greece and received with great sympathy and celebrated as national hero.

- Nobel Prize in Physiology or Medicine 1948
- Honorary member of the "Swiss Nature Research Society" 1949
- Honorary member of the "Paris Society of Industrial Chemistry" 1949
- Honorary member of the "Reale Accademia Internazionale del Parnaso (Napoli)" 1951
- Medal of Honour of the "Congrès Internationale de Phytopharmacie et Phytiatrie (Paris)" 1952
- Honorary member of the "Academia Brasileira de Medicina Militar (Rio de Janeiro)" 1954
- Honorary doctorate at the Universidad Nacional Eva Perón
- Honorary professorship at the "Escuela Superior Tecnica e Investigacion Cientifica (Buenos Aires)"
- Honorary doctorate at the Aristotle University of Thessaloniki 1963
- Golden medal of the city of Thessaloniki 1963

== Publications ==
- Müller, Paul Hermann (1925), Die chemische und elektrochemische Oxidation des as. m-Xylidins und seines Mono- und Di-Methylderivates, Basel: Universität Basel, Philosophische Fakultät. Inauguraldissertation
- Fichter, Friedrich; Müller, Paul Hermann (1925). "Chemische und elektrochemische Oxydation des as. m-Xylidins und seines Mono- und Di-Methylderivats". Helvetica Chimica Acta. 8 (1): 290–300. doi:10.1002/hlca.19250080148.
- Läuger, P; Martin, H; Müller, Paul Hermann (1944), "Über Konstitution und toxische Wirkung von natürlichen und neuen synthetischen insektentötenden Stoffen", Helvetica Chimica Acta, 27 (1), Genf / Basel: Helv. Chim. Acta.: 892–928, Bibcode:1944HChAc..27..892L, doi:10.1002/hlca.194402701115
- Müller, Paul Hermann (1946), Über Zusammenhänge zwischen Konstitution und insektizider Wirkung, vol. 29, Genf / Basel: Helv. Chim. Acta, pp. 1560–1580
- Müller, Paul Hermann (1946), Relations entre la constitution chimique et l'action insecticide dans le groupe de Dichlorodiphényltrichloroéthane et Dérivés apparantes, Compte-Rendu du Premier Congrès International de Phytopharmacie. Hévérle, p. 97
- Müller, Paul Hermann (1949), Dichlorodiphenyläthan und neuere Insektizide. Nobel lecture, delivered 11. December 1948. In "Les Prix Nobel en 1948", Stockholm: Kungl.Boktryckeriet P. A. Norstedt & Söner, pp. 122–123
- Müller, Paul Hermann (1949), Physik und Chemie des Dichlorodiphenyläthans, Berlin / Göttingen / Heidelberg: Ergebn. Hyg. Bakteriol. Immunitätsforsch. exp. Therap., pp. 8–17
- Müller, Paul Hermann (1949), DDT and the newer insekticides, London: Proceedings of the 2nd International Congress on Crop Protection
- Müller, Paul Hermann; Spindler, M (1954). "Die Chemie der Insektizide, ihre Entwicklung und ihr heutiger Stand". Experientia. 10 (3). Basel: 91–131. doi:10.1007/BF02158514. PMID 13161889. S2CID 45271225.
- Müller, Paul Hermann (1954), Chlorierte Kohlenwasserstoffe in der Schädlingsbekämpfung. In: Ullmanns Encyklopädie der technischen Chemie. 5. Band, München / Berlin: Urban & Schwarzenberg, pp. 477–486
- Müller, Paul Hermann (1955), Physik und Chemie des DDT-Insektizides. In: DDT, das Insektizid Dichlorodiphenyläthan und seine Bedeutung Vol I, Basel / Stuttgart: Birkhäuser, pp. 29–89
- Müller, Paul Hermann (1959), Verwendung der Antibiotica im Pflanzenschutz und Vorratsschutz, vol. 6, Basel / New York: Antibiotica et Chemotherapia, pp. 1–40, hdl:2027/uc1.b3752763
- Müller, Paul Hermann (1961), Zwanzig Jahre wissenschaftliche - synthetische Bearbeitung des Gebietes der synthetischen Insektizide, vol. 14, Stuttgart: Naturwiss. Rdsch., pp. 209–219
- Müller, Paul Hermann (1964), Schädlingsbekämpfung; Insekticide und andere Insektenbekämpfungsmittel. In: Ullmanns Encyklopädie der technischen Chemie. 15. Band, München / Berlin: Urban & Schwarzenberg, pp. 103–131
