= Hans Rupe =

Swiss chemist (1866–1951)

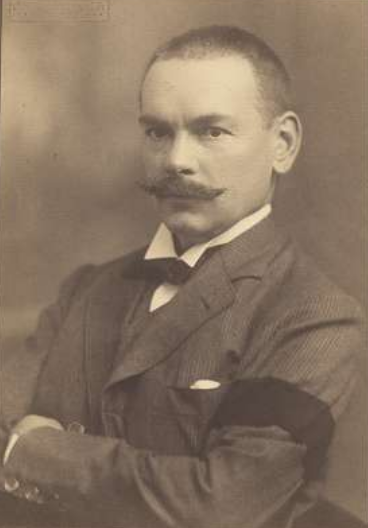
- Rupe in 1910
- Born: 9 October 1866; Basel, Switzerland
- Died: 12 January 1951 (aged 84)
- Education: Ludwig-Maximilians-Universität München; University of Strasbourg; University of Basel
- Known for: Rupe rearrangement
- Scientific career
- Fields: Organic chemistry
- Workplaces: University of Basel
- Thesis: Über die Reduktionsprodukte der Dichloromuconsäure (1889)

Johan Hermann Wilhelm Rupe (9 October 1866 in Basel – 12 January 1951) was a professor of organic chemistry at the University of Basel. His main field of interest was terpenes and camphor as well as optical activity.

== Life ==
Rupe was born on 9 October 1866 in Basel to Johannes Rupe and Mathilde Rupe (born Fischer) and went to school in Basel. He passed his Maturität in 1885 and then went on to study at the University of Basel under Julius Piccard. He continued his studies at the University of Strasbourg under Rudolf Fittig and then in 1887 at the Ludwig-Maximilians-Universität München under Adolf von Baeyer. Rupe received his PhD in 1889 at the Ludwig-Maximilians-Universität München for his dissertation Über die Reduktionsprodukte der Dichloromuconsäure.

In 1894, he went to Mulhouse to become head of the "Chemieschule" in the organic division. Rupe habilitated in 1895 in Basel, where he moved in 1899. In 1903, he became an associate professor for organic chemistry at the University of Basel. He worked with the chemistry Professor Rudolf Nietzki, who retired in 1911. In 1911 or 1912, he was promoted to full professor for organic chemistry (while his colleague Friedrich Fichter became professor for inorganic chemistry). During his time as a professor, he supervised nearly 150 students and published over 250 scientific articles.

In 1907, he married Margrit Hagenback, daughter of Eduard Hagenbach-Bischoff with whom he had three children. His wife died in 1926 and in 1933 his youngest son died. In 1936, he married Marguerite Lutz.

Rupe retired in 1937 and died on 12 January 1951.

== Honors ==
- foreign member of the Deutsche Akademie der Naturforscher Leopoldina (1932).
- president and co-founder of the Schweizerischen Chemischen Gesellschaft
- editor of Helvetica Chimica Acta.
- discoverer of a named reaction, the Rupe rearrangement

== Publications ==
- Ungesättigte Aldehyde aus Acetylen‐alkoholen, Helvetica Chimica Acta, 9, 672, 1926.
- Anleitung zum Experimentieren in der Vorlesung über organische Chemie, Braunschweig, 1. Aufl. 1909, 2. Aufl. 1930.
- Adolf von Baeyer als Lehrer und Forscher. Erinnerungen aus seinem Privatlaboratorium. Stuttgart 1932.
