= Rudolf Nietzki =

German chemist (1847–1917)

Rudolf Hugo Nietzki
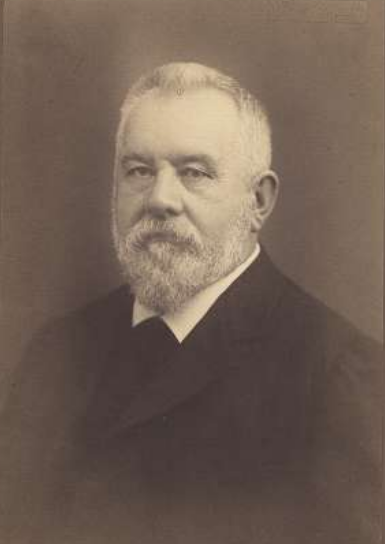
- Rudolf Nietzki
- Born: 9 March 1847; Heilsberg, East Prussia (now Lidzbark Warmiński, Poland)
- Died: 28 September 1917 (aged 70); Neckargemünd, Baden-Württemberg, Germany
- Occupation: Chemist

Rudolf Hugo Nietzki (9 March 1847 – 28 September 1917) was a German chemist who specialized in industrial dyes derived from coal tar. While a professor at the University of Basel in Switzerland he initiated the university's association with to the local chemical industry.

== Life ==
Rudolf Hugo Nietzki was born on 9 March 1847 in Heilsberg, East Prussia (now Lidzbark Warmiński, Poland) to a Protestant family. His father was Carl Johann Emil Nietzki, a priest, rector and writer. He attended the Königsberg gymnasium (secondary school), which he left before graduating, then began training as a pharmacist. He studied pharmacy in Zinten (now Kornevo, Kaliningrad, Russia) and Kreuzburg, Silesia (now Kluczbork, Poland). In 1865 he qualified as an assistant. He worked as a pharmacist in Hirschberg, Silesia, where he met Paul Ehrlich, who later invented chemotherapy.

Nietzki attended the University of Berlin from 1867 to 1870, where he studied pharmacy. He served as a military pharmacist during the Franco-Prussian War of 1870–71, then returned to the university. Nietzki sat the Staatsexamen to qualify as a pharmacist in 1871, and served as the private assistant of the chemist August Wilhelm von Hofmann (1818–92). In 1874 he received his PhD in the University of Göttingen.

After graduating Nietzki worked as an analyst in the sulfuric acid and soda factory of Matthes & Weber in Düsseldorf. From 1876 he was assistant to Antoine Paul Nicolas Franchimont (1844–1919) at Leiden University. In 1879 he began to work for Kalle & Co. in Biebrich, Rhineland Palatinate. In a letter to Heinrich Caro that year Nietski wrote of his position with this dye company, "I have my own small but nice laboratory and nothing to do with the manufacturing; moreover I shall have the same position as you have in Ludwigshafen: That of an inventor!"

In 1880 Nietzki married Minna Bickerle. He moved to Basel, Switzerland, where he worked for Geigy. Nietzki studied for his habilitation under the Swiss chemist Jules Piccard (1840–1933) in 1884 at the University of Basel. He was appointed Associate Professor of Chemistry at Basel in 1887. In 1888 Nietzki wrote a highly regarded textbook on organic dyes. In 1895 he became Professor of Chemistry. Nietzki specialized in industrially useful dyes, and initiated the University of Basel's association with the chemical industry. He worked in his private laboratory, subsidized by the state, in the Kleinbasel ice factory. He was assisted by Friedrich Fichter as inorganic chemist and Hans Rupe as organic chemist. Nietzki resigned due to illness in 1911. He was made Professor Emeritus by the university. He died on 28 September 1917 in Neckargemünd, Baden-Württemberg.

== Work ==
Nietzki played a leading role in the development of a new class of synthetic dyes derived from coal tar. He made his name through his work on quinone derivatives and azo dyes. In 1876 he analyzed the synthetic dye Anilinschwarz (Aniline black). In 1877 he discovered that indamine dyes were formed in the oxidative coupling of p-diamines and monoamines. He synthesized nitranil acid and developed a simple method for the preparation of p-benzoquinone. In 1878 he created "Biebrich scarlet" the first tetra azo dye. While working at Kalle & Co. Nietzki recognized that Raphael Meldola's synthetic dye, Meldola's Blue, was a member of the oxazine class.

== Publications ==
- R. Nietzki; Th. Benckiser (1885). "Ueber Hexaoxybenzolderivate und ihre Beziehungen zur Krokonsäure und Rhodizonsäure". Berichte der Deutschen Chemischen Gesellschaft. 18: 499–515. doi:10.1002/cber.188501801110.
- R. Nietzki (1888). Chemie der Organischen Farbstoffe. 5th edition in 1906. Berlin: Verlag von Julius Springer.
- Rudolf Nietzki (2008). Chemistry of the Organic Dyestuffs. translated by A. Collin and W. Richardson. Nachdruck als Taschenbuch: Verlag BiblioBazaar. ISBN 978-1110018376.

== Sources ==
- Charpa, Ulrich; Deichmann, Ute (2007-01-01). Jews and Sciences in German Contexts: Case Studies from the 19th and 20th Centuries. Mohr Siebeck. ISBN 978-3-16-149121-4.
- "Die Anfänge des Fachs Chemie an der Universität Basel" (in German). University of Basel. 2010.
- Kurz, Martin (2010-03-06). "Nietzki, Rudolf". Historischen Lexikon der Schweiz (in German). Bern.
- Reinhardt, Carsten; Travis, Anthony S. (2013-06-29). Heinrich Caro and the Creation of Modern Chemical Industry. Springer Science & Business Media. ISBN 978-94-015-9353-3.
- Schwarz, Holm-Dietmar (1999). "Nietzki, Rudolf Hugo". Neue Deutsche Biographie (in German). Vol. 19.
