= Picardy (disambiguation) =

Picardy is a historical territory of France.

Picardy may also refer to:

- Picardy (hymn), a hymn tune
- Picardy (wine), an Australian winery
- Picardy third, in music, a major key ending to a minor key piece
- Picard language, a regional language in northern France and parts of Belgium
- Picardy Shepherd, a breed of dog from the Picardy region of France
- Pikkardiyska Tertsia, a Ukrainian music group

== See also ==
- Picard (disambiguation)
- Picardi, an Italian surname
