= Pickard-Cambridge =

Pickard-Cambridge is a surname that may refer to:

- Sir Arthur Wallace Pickard-Cambridge (1873–1952), an English classicist
- Frederick Octavius Pickard-Cambridge (1860–1905), an English arachnologist
- Octavius Pickard-Cambridge (1828–1917), an English clergyman and naturalist

== See also ==
- Pickard
- Cambridge (disambiguation)#Surnames
