= Jeannette Piccard =

American balloonist and priest (1895–1981)

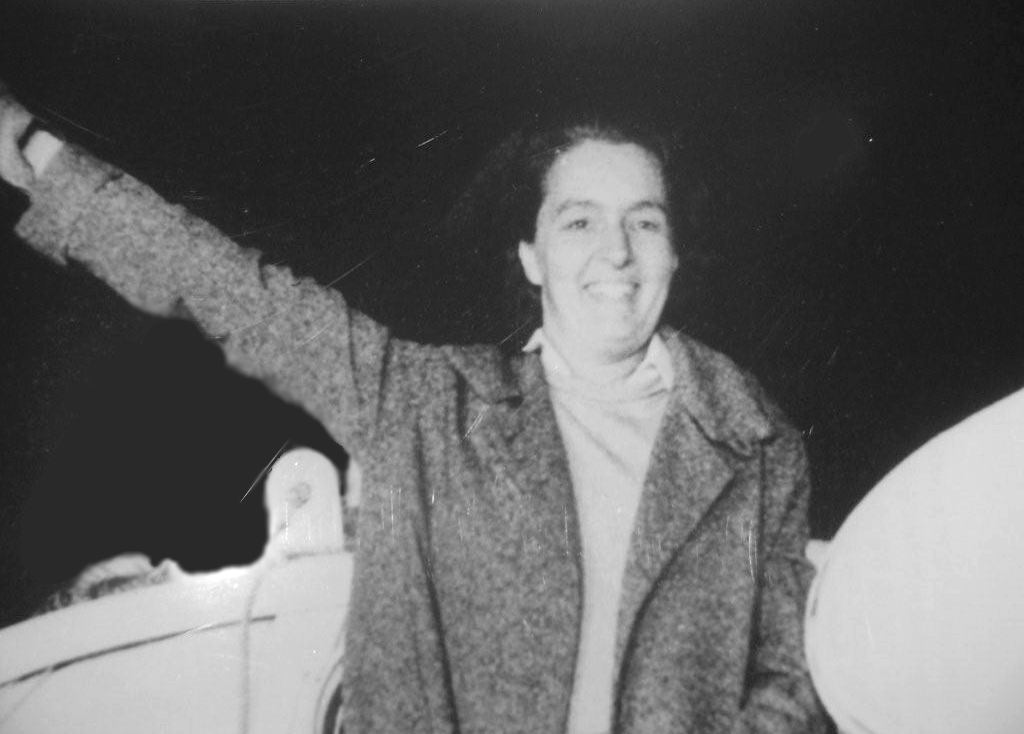
- Piccard and the Century of Progress in Cadiz, Ohio, after her record-breaking flight, 1934
- Born: Jeannette Ridlon; January 5, 1895; Chicago, Illinois, U.S.
- Died: May 17, 1981 (aged 86); Minneapolis, Minnesota, U.S.
- Education: Bryn Mawr College; University of Chicago; University of Minnesota
- Occupations: Balloonist; scientist; priest
- Known for: The first licensed female balloon pilot in the U.S.; the first woman to fly to the stratosphere; co-inventor of the plastic balloon; the first woman to be ordained an Episcopal priest in the U.S.
- Spouse: Jean Piccard (m. 1919; died 1963)
- Children: 3, including Don
- Relatives: Auguste; Bertrand; Jacques

Jeannette Ridlon Piccard (/dʒəˈnɛt pɪˈkɑːr/ jə-NET pih-KAR; January 5, 1895 – May 17, 1981) was an American high-altitude balloonist, and in later life an Episcopal priest, one of the Philadelphia Eleven. She held the women's altitude record for nearly three decades, and according to several contemporaneous accounts was regarded as the first woman in space.

Piccard was the first licensed female balloon pilot in the U.S., and the first woman to fly to the stratosphere. Accompanied by her husband, Jean—a member of the Piccard family of balloonists and the twin brother of Auguste Piccard—she reached a height of 10.9 miles (17.5 km) during a record-breaking flight over Lake Erie on October 23, 1934, retaining control of the balloon for the entire flight. After her husband's death in 1963, she worked as a consultant to the director of NASA's Johnson Space Center for several years, talking to the public about NASA's work, and was posthumously inducted into the International Space Hall of Fame in 1998.

From the late 1960s onwards, Piccard returned to her childhood interest in religion. She was ordained a deacon of the Episcopal Church in 1971, and on July 29, 1974, became one of the Philadelphia Eleven, the first women to be ordained priests—though the ordinations were regarded as irregular, performed by bishops who had retired or resigned. Piccard was the first of the women to be ordained that day, because at 79 she was the oldest, and because she was fulfilling an ambition she had had since she was 11 years old. When asked by Bishop John Allin, the head of the church, not to proceed with the ceremony, she is said to have told him, "Sonny, I'm old enough to have changed your nappies." In September 1976, the church voted to allow women into the priesthood, and Piccard served as a priest in Saint Paul, Minnesota, until she died at the age of 86. One of her granddaughters, Kathryn Piccard, also an Episcopal priest, said of her: "She wanted to expand the idea of what a respectable lady could do. She had the image of the street-wise old lady."

== Early life and education ==
Born on January 5, 1895, in Chicago, Illinois, Piccard was one of nine children born to Emily Caroline (Robinson) and John Frederick Ridlon, who was president of the American Orthopaedic Association. She had a lifelong interest in science and religion. When she was 11, her mother asked her what she wanted to be when she grew up. Piccard's reply—"a priest"—sent her mother running out of the room in tears.

Piccard studied philosophy and psychology at Bryn Mawr College, where in 1916 she wrote an essay titled "Should Women Be Admitted to the Priesthood of the Anglican Church?" She received her bachelor's degree in 1918 and went on to study organic chemistry at the University of Chicago, receiving her master's degree in 1919. That same year she met and married Jean Felix Piccard, who was teaching at the university. (Note: During the 1980s, Gene Roddenberry most likely named Captain Jean-Luc Picard in Star Trek after one or both of the twin brothers Auguste Piccard and Jean Piccard.)

Piccard was the mother of a house full of boys. Robert R. Gilruth, one of her students and collaborators, said later in his oral history that he remembered a breakfast he had with the Piccards in a St. Cloud, Minnesota hotel before a balloon launching, "I don't know how many there were. It seems like there was a dozen. ... I remember the youngest one took the corn flake box and dumped it on his father's head. Of course, Piccard just brushed it off his head and said, 'No, no.'" "He was very gentle. He loved his boys, and he thought boys would be boys, I guess." The Piccards had three sons of their own, John, Paul, and Donald (who would become a famous balloonist and ballooning innovator in his own right), as well as foster children. The Piccard family archive in the Library of Congress mentions correspondence from foster children whom the Piccards took in, although nothing else seems to be known about them.

The Piccards taught at the University of Lausanne from 1919 to 1926. In 1926 they returned to the United States, where Jean Piccard taught organic chemistry at the Massachusetts Institute of Technology. The couple lived in Massachusetts, New Jersey, Delaware, and Pennsylvania before settling in Minneapolis in 1936 when Jean Piccard joined the faculty of the University of Minnesota. Jeanette Piccard received a doctorate in education from the University of Minnesota in 1942, and a certificate of study from the General Theological Seminary in 1973.

Gilruth made a point of describing Piccard in his oral history. He said, "She was very bright, had her own doctor's degree, and was at least half of the brains of that family, technical as well as otherwise. ... She was always in the room when he was lecturing or otherwise, almost always. She was something. She was good." David DeVorkin, curator of the Smithsonian National Air and Space Museum, wrote a history of manned scientific ballooning. In DeVorkin's view, the Piccards' "entrepreneurship and subsequent success" in ballooning was due to "their enormous persistence ... and considerable confidence, pluck, and luck".

== Stratosphere flight ==
=== Planning and pilot's license ===
After Thomas G. W. Settle's record flight in the Piccards' Century of Progress, the balloon was again returned to the Piccards, who decided to fly it to the stratosphere on their own. Jean would concentrate on the science, while Jeannette would pilot the balloon. DeVorkin wrote that, "Energetic and forceful, she seemed to have a better chance of obtaining a pilot's license than Jean, who was preoccupied with restoring the gondola and balloon and convincing scientists to provide instruments to fly". She studied at Ford Airport in Dearborn, Michigan, under Edward J. Hill, a balloonist and Gordon Bennett Cup winner, who agreed to serve as flight director for the Piccards' planned stratospheric flight. Henry Ford offered the use of his hangar and brought Orville Wright (with his brother Wilbur, inventor of the airplane and first human to fly a heavier-than-air powered aircraft) to observe a flight of Jeannette's in 1933. (Note: Don Piccard recalled this was 1933 but Oakes and others at the Smithsonian suggest it was really 1934.) Her son Don was a crew member that day and shook hands with Wright, "I was a little kid and he [paid] attention to me." On June 16, 1934, Jeannette flew her first solo flight. Later that year, the National Aeronautic Association made her the first woman licensed balloon pilot in the U.S. Jeannette had a sense of humor Auguste wrote to Jean in June 1934, "Hopefully you will make your flight ahead of other competitors. It would be nice, if the name of Piccard through Jeannette, would once more be placed on the record list of the F.A.I."

When she was interviewed near the end of her life, and asked why she had not hired a pilot and why she had decided to become a pilot herself, Jeannette replied, "How much loyalty can you count on from someone you hire?" The Piccards were a team; Jeannette joked that "I didn't go up with him, he went up with me." Her husband needed a pilot, and she became one. When she was asked if she had parachute training, Jeannette said, "No ... if, on the first time you jump, you don't succeed, there's no use trying again."

=== Search for funding ===
High altitude ballooning was a dangerous undertaking, partly because human lungs cannot function unaided over 40,000–50,000 feet (12,000–15,000 m), and partly because the lifting gas used, hydrogen, is flammable. Jeannette said later that, "The National Geographic Society would have nothing to do with sending a woman—a mother—in a balloon into danger". Longtime Piccard family backer Goodyear was reluctant to support their flight. Dow Chemical asked that their trade names and logo be removed from publicity and from the Century of Progress balloon.

Gilruth said, "I remember that Piccard was very, very hurt by the National Geographic that would not give them a dime. ... Both he and Jeanette said that they were discriminated against by the National Geographic. That's not a good word. They were not aided in any way by the National Geographic, and they felt it was not really warranted. They felt they should have gotten some help from them. ... [He] didn't say why, but they certainly didn't feel they'd been handled fairly." The Piccards struggled to gain financial support until the Grigsby-Grunow Radio Company advanced them several thousand dollars. The Detroit Aero Club and People's Outfitting Company also backed them. To supplement their sponsorship, Jeannette designed and sold commemorative stamps and souvenir programs and folders. She also raised a good deal of money by selling their story in press releases to the North American Newspaper Alliance.

=== Flight ===
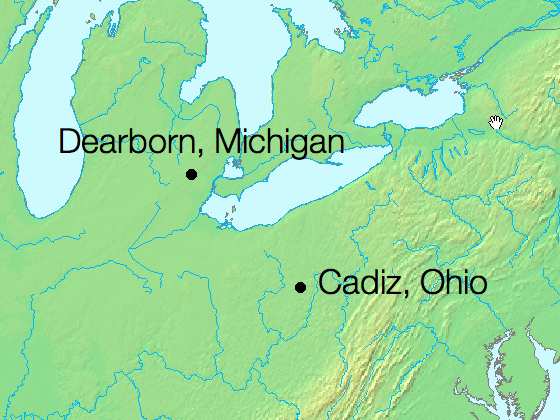
The flight from Dearborn, Michigan, to Cadiz, Ohio

Forty-five thousand spectators came to see the Piccards off on October 23, 1934, at 6:51 am, about two hours behind schedule. Jeannette piloted the reconditioned Century of Progress, and the couple took along their pet turtle, Fleur de Lys. After a brief pre-launch ceremony, during which the Piccards received a bouquet from their sons and a small band played The Star-Spangled Banner, they lifted off from Ford Airport, assisted by airmen on the ground who pushed the gondola. Jean changed the flight path and shortened the flight time because of cloudy skies, which reduced the amount of scientific work they were able to do. Jeannette made "unplanned and impulsive maneuvres" and the Piccards failed to make complete records of their actions during the flight. The newspaper alliance had offered to pay them US$1,000 if they broke the altitude record, so they jettisoned all of their sandbags, attempting to go higher. They reached 57,579 feet (17,550 m) or about 10.9 miles (17.5 km) up, travelled for eight hours on a journey over Lake Erie, and landed about 300 miles (480 km) away from Dearborn, near Cadiz, Ohio. She had to choose a landing on elm trees, realizing that meant the Century of Progress would never fly again. The balloon separated from the gondola and was ripped. Jean sustained small fractures to his ribs, left foot, and ankle. According to Jeannette's description in Time magazine: "What a mess! I wanted to land on the White House lawn."

=== Legacy ===
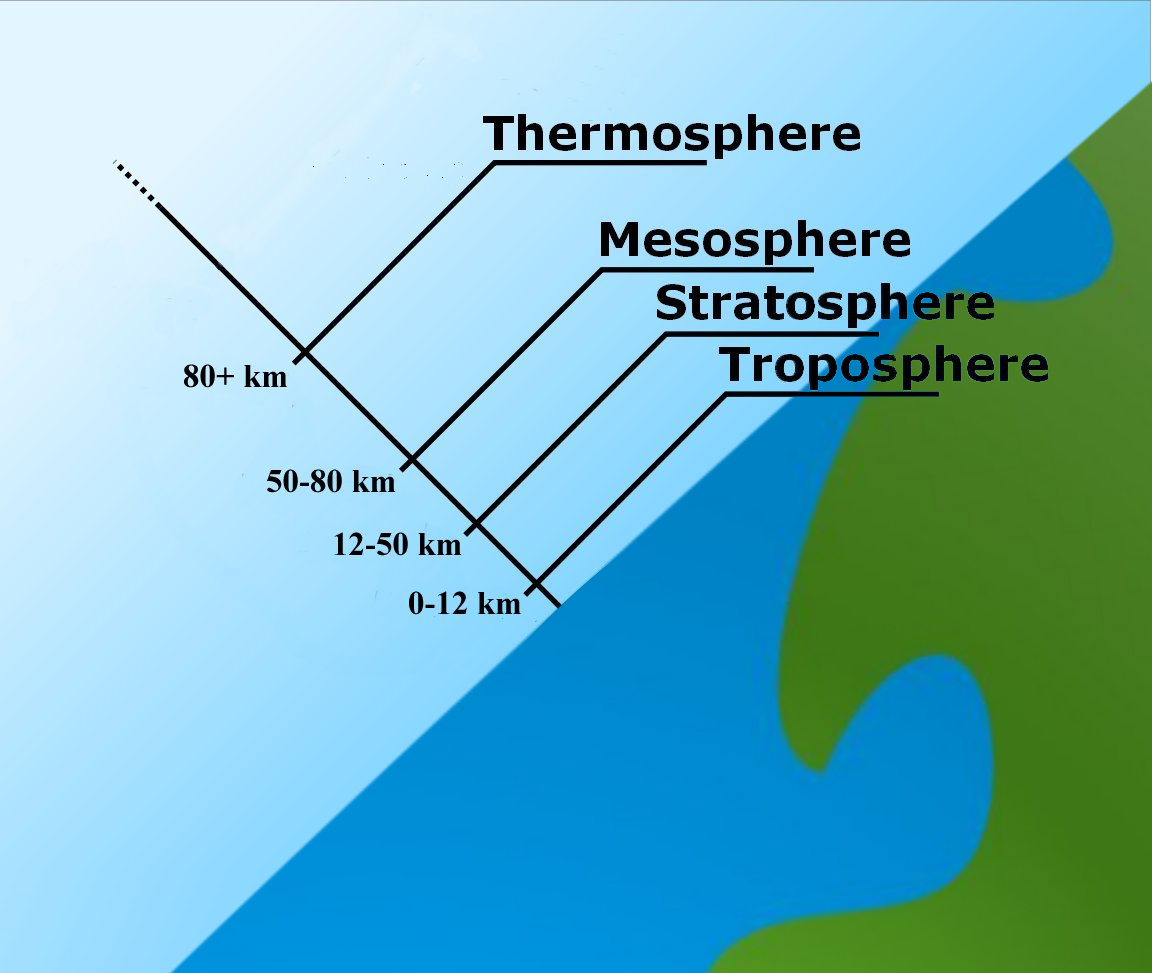
Piccard reached nearly 11 miles (18 km) up into the stratosphere. Today, NASA pilots are called astronauts for reaching 50 miles (80 km). (Note: For comparison, modern commercial airliners cruise between about 6 and 8 miles (9 and 13 km) above sea level (MSL), and the Concorde supersonic jet carried passengers at between 9 and 11 miles (15 and 18 km) MSL.)

Piccard's flight set the women's altitude record, and held it for 29 years, until Valentina Tereshkova in 1963 became the first woman in space, orbiting the Earth 48 times solo in the Soviet Union's Vostok 6. According to the editors of Flying magazine, in their book Sport Flying, published by Ziff-Davis in 1976, Piccard was "the first woman in space, a claim allowed even by Valentina Tereshkova." (Note: According to a conversation reported by the New Mexico Museum of Space History website, Piccard's son said to Tereshkova in 1975, "My mother is Jeannette Piccard, who piloted a balloon to 57,000 feet in 1934, more than two miles into Physiological Space. And she wanted me to congratulate you on your marvelous achievement, and on behalf of all the women in America to welcome you to Space." Tereshkova replied, "I know very well who your mother is. And I am most appreciative of her good wishes, and please give her all my love.") She was also the first woman to pilot a flight to the stratosphere, and according to her obituary in The New York Times, the first person to do so through a layer of clouds.

== Later life, death of Jean Piccard ==
The Piccards, University of Minnesota, 1936

Jean and Jeannette felt they had succeeded by reaching the stratosphere, and they became popular lecturers. They prepared brochures and souvenirs to attract attention to the flight, one titled "Who Said We Couldn't Do It." But they had developed perhaps unreasonable expectations that lucrative university positions would come to them. Both wrote to dozens of colleges and universities, aiming high—even at college presidencies, trying to secure positions, but they received only rejections. In December 1934, Jeannette wrote to Dr. W. F. G. Swann to ask if Jean might become a member of the chemistry staff of the Bartol Research Foundation at the Franklin Institute, and also offered her services, but was turned down. Luckily, they met a new advocate while on lecture tour to Minneapolis. Thanks to John Akerman of the department of aeronautical engineering at the University of Minnesota, Jean became an untenured professor in Minnesota by 1936, teaching and doing aeronautical studies until 1946 when he received tenure. During 1943, Jeannette was briefly an executive secretary at the housing section of the Minnesota Office of Civil Defense.

In 1946 until mid-1947, the Piccards were consultants to General Mills (the cereal company and dominant industry in Minneapolis) working under Otto Winzen, who Jean had met through the university. Winzen and Jean proposed a stratosphere flight with 100 cluster balloons and secured a government contract with the Navy. Featured in Navy press releases, Jean was named a project scientist responsible for gondola design and for testing the balloon film materials. But he balked, both at making weekly status reports that made him feel like a lower-level employee, and at the prospect of General Mills owning the patents to his ideas. Working as a consultant, Jeannette threatened to break off ties with the Navy and General Mills unless she was allowed to fly with Jean. Unfortunately this began a rift between General Mills and the Piccards. They were both fired in 1947, for being too critical of Winzen and General Mills staff.

Jean retired from the University of Minnesota when he was 68, never giving up his dream of returning to the stratosphere. DeVorkin quoted a newspaper in 1952, "to Adventurer Piccard, no gondola probing the unexplored purple twilight of the stratosphere would be complete without him and his wife in it". Jean died in 1963.

Gilruth asked Jeannette to work as a consultant at NASA. She accepted and lived in a house in Houston she shared with another woman. Jeannette spoke to the scientific community and to the public at NASA about the space program from 1964 to 1970, when Project Apollo was created and Apollo 11 made the first crewed Moon landing in 1969. Bob Gilruth, head of NASA Manned Spaceflight Center, stated about Jeannette Piccard, "She was very bright, had her own doctor's [PhD] degree, and was at least half the brains of that family, technical as well as otherwise. She was something. She was good." Gilruth then noticed a shift in her interests, away from space and towards religion.

== Episcopal priest ==
=== Ordination ===
In 1971, one year after the Episcopal Church admitted female deacons, Piccard was ordained a deacon and, on July 29, 1974, at age 79, under controversial circumstances, she was ordained a priest. In Philadelphia, at the Church of the Advocate, three retired bishops – Daniel Corrigan, former church head of domestic missions, Robert L. De Witt of the diocese of Pennsylvania, and Edward Randolph Welles II of the diocese of West Missouri – ordained eleven women priests, cheered by a large congregation. A fourth bishop, José Antonio Ramos of Costa Rica, was there but was out of his jurisdiction. All eleven women risked suspension as deacons, and the four bishops "could be suspended or deposed by a church trial court" for ignoring a church canon prohibiting retired bishops from performing "episcopal acts" unless asked by a local bishop. Five Episcopal priests objected at the point in the service when Corrigan asked if there was "any impediment" to the ordinations, one calling the ordinations a "perversion" and another calling them "unlawful and schismatical."

Piccard was the first of the eleven women ordained because she was the oldest and she was fulfilling a lifelong dream. Carter Heyward – another of the group who were known as "irregulars" and sometimes called the "Philadelphia Eleven" – became the 1974 Ms. magazine Woman of the Year. Suzanne Hiatt later said "In retrospect, to have been ordained 'irregularly' is the only way for women to have done it." Alison Cheek, Heyward, and Piccard joined in the consecration, and Piccard gave the absolution, in a celebration of the Eucharist at Riverside Church in Manhattan in November 1974. Philip McNairy of the Diocese of Minnesota, who wanted women in the priesthood, was concerned that the eleven were hurting the cause of the other women deacons, who numbered over one hundred at the time.

=== Fallout, women recognized ===
A proposal to recognize women priests had been narrowly defeated at the triennial general convention of 1973 held in Louisville, Kentucky John M. Allin of Mississippi, the new (as of June) presiding bishop of the Episcopal Church, which had 3.1 million members at the time, called an emergency meeting of the House of Bishops in Chicago in August 1974. Jeannette told Allin, "Sonny, I'm old enough to have changed your nappies."

Harold B. Robinson, a bishop in the diocese of Western New York, and two colleagues set in motion charges accusing the three bishops of breaking their vows and violating church laws. They withdrew charges when the House of Bishops, in a carefully worded resolution that passed 129 to 9 with 8 abstentions, challenged the ordinations and decried the bishops' actions, calling them understandable but "wrong". But the church was moving in this direction already, and the general convention of 1976 held in Minneapolis voted to open the priesthood to women.

=== Life as a priest ===
Jeannette served as a deacon or irregular at St. Philip's Episcopal Church in Saint Paul, Minnesota from 1975 to 1977. In 1977 the Episcopal Church recognized her ordination. Kathryn Piccard, her granddaughter, who also became an Episcopal priest, was later quoted in The New York Times as saying, "She wanted to expand the idea of what a respectable lady could do. She had the image of the street-wise old lady." Jeannette became a volunteer chaplain at St. Luke's Hospital, now United Hospital, and assistant pastor to Denzil Carty at Episcopal Church on Maccubin, both in Saint Paul. From 1968 until 1981 she was an honorary member of the Seabury-Western Theological Seminary board of trustees.

Jeannette died of cancer on May 17, 1981, at the Masonic Memorial Hospital in Minneapolis, Minnesota, aged 86.

== Honors ==
Jeannette received the Harmon Trophy in 1934. The National Aeronautic Association gave her a Certificate of Reward & Performance in 1935. In 1965 she received the first William Randolph Lovelace II Award from the American Astronautical Society (AAS). The University of Minnesota Alumni Association gave her an Outstanding Achievement Award in 1968 and engraved her name on their wall of honor. Graduate Women in Science, also known as Sigma Delta Epsilon, made her an honorary member "For Excellence In Scientific Research" in 1971. Hobart and William Smith Colleges gave her an honorary doctorate. She received the Robert R. Gilruth Award in 1970 from the North Galveston County Chamber of Commerce.

She was posthumously inducted into the International Space Hall of Fame in 1998, and she and her husband were nominated to the FAI Ballooning Commission Hall of Fame. The Balloon Federation of America renamed its award the Piccard Memorial Trophy. Pat Donohue wrote Solo Flight, a one-woman play about Jeannette's life. The Bryn Mawr College Library has the Jeanette Ridlon Piccard Book Fund, which provides funds for the purchase of books on the history of religion.

== Notes ==
Records
Preceded by Maryse Hilsz	Women's Altitude record 1934–1963	Succeeded by Valentina Tereshkova
