= Friedrich Fichter =

Swiss chemist (1869–1952)

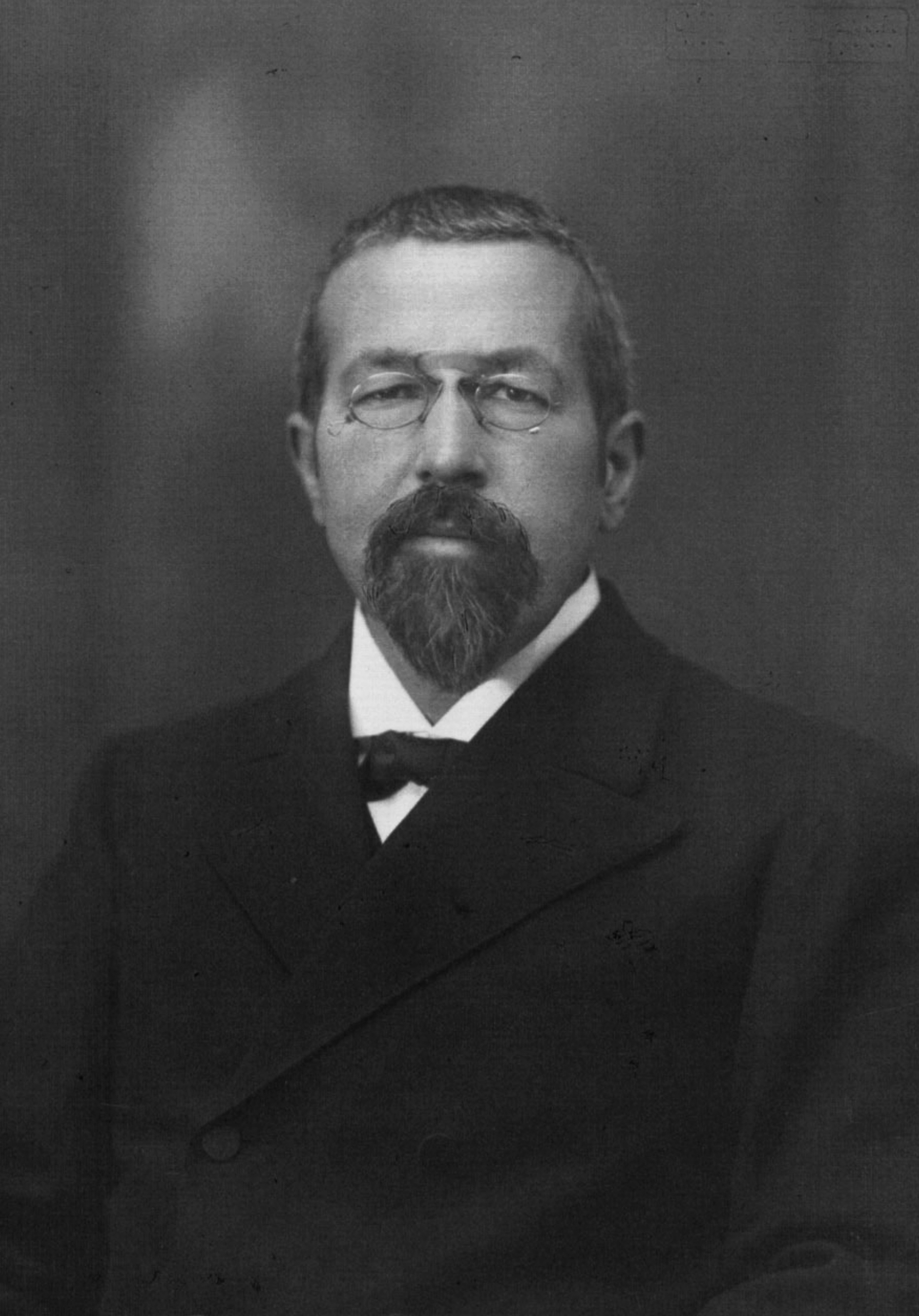
- Born: July 6, 1869
- Died: 1952 (aged 82–83)
- Education: University of Basel
- Scientific career
- Fields: Chemistry
- Workplaces: University of Basel

Friedrich Fichter (6 July 1869 – 1952) was a professor of inorganic chemistry at the University of Basel. His main field of interest was electrochemistry. He initiated the founding of the scientific journal Helvetica Chimica Acta.

== Life ==
Fichter was born on the July 6th, 1869 and attended the University of Basel from 1888 to 1890 and then the University of Strasbourg. He studied under Rudolf Fittig and become his assistant in 1893. He was awarded a PhD in 1894 and in 1896 he habilitated and became a "Privatdozent". In 1903 he became extraordinary professor and was promoted to ordinary professor in 1912 and head of the inorganic division (while his colleague Hans Rupe became professor for organic chemistry). The two worked with the chemistry Professor Rudolf Nietzki, who retired in 1911.

Fichter retired in 1939 and died in 1952.

== Honors ==
- Guest professor at the University of Birmingham (1928).
- president of the Union of Swiss Chemical Societies.
- vice-president of the International Union of Chemistry.
- editor in chief of Helvetica Chimica Acta.

== Publications ==
- Anleitung zum Studium der chemischen Reaktionen" (4th edition, 1928)
- Übungen in quantitativer chemischer Analyse (2nd edition, 1938)
- Das Verhältnis der anorganischen zur organischen Chemie" (1933)
- Organische Elektrochemie (1942) Link
