= Cathérine Picart =

French biophysicist and bioengineer

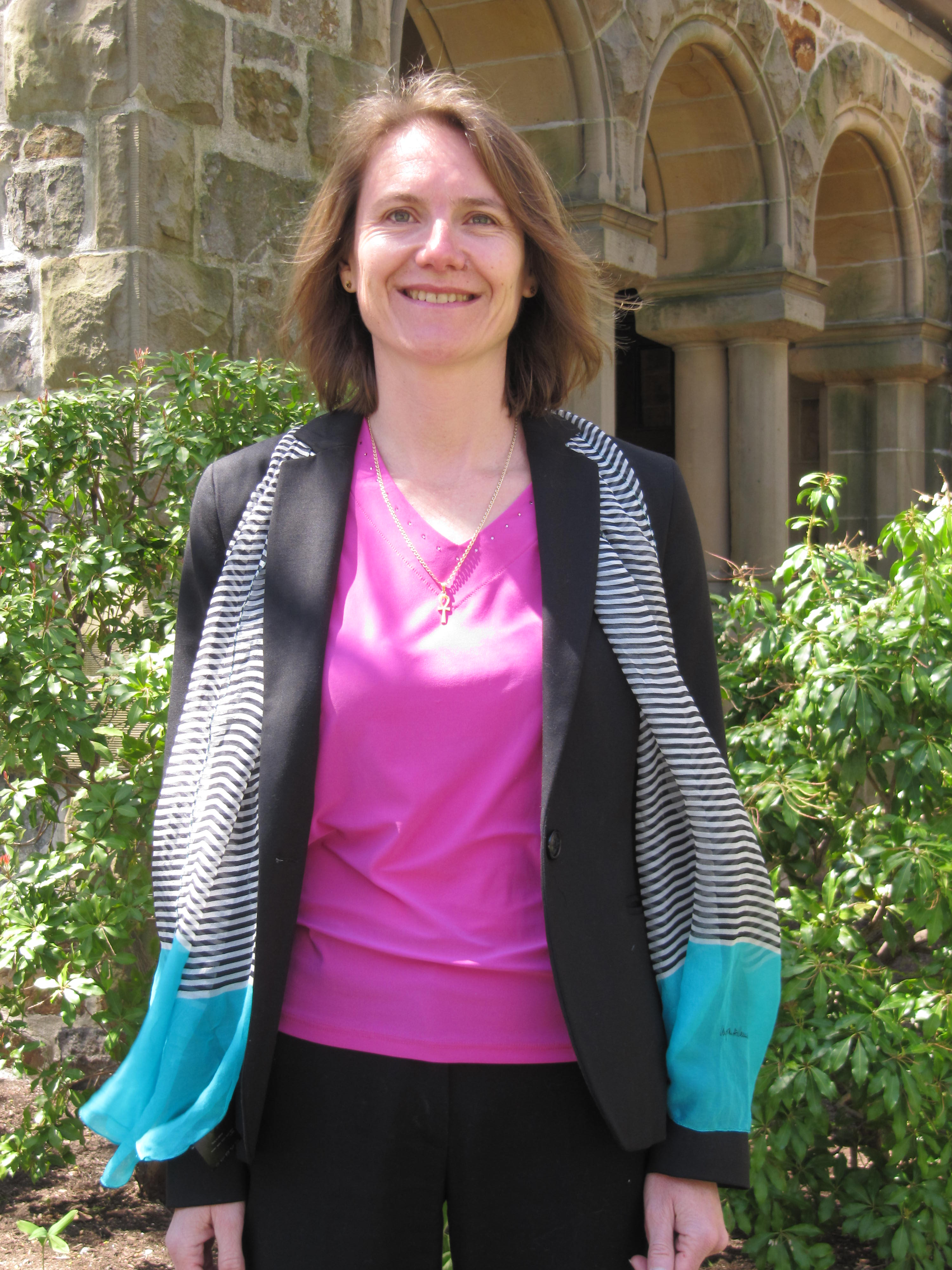

Cathérine Cécile Picart (born 24 October 1971) is a French biophysicist and bioengineer. She is the Head of the Department of Health at CEA Grenoble (French Alternative Energies and Atomic Energy Commission) in the area of fundamental research, a professor at the Institut polytechnique de Grenoble École nationale supérieure de physique, électronique, matériaux (PHELMA) and researcher at the Laboratoire des Matériaux et du Génie Physique (LMGP).

== Biography ==
In 1994, She graduated from the Institut polytechnique de Grenoble with a degree in the physics of materials, and a masters degree in biomedical engineering from the Université Joseph Fourier. Her doctoral thesis in biomedical engineering was also completed at the Université Joseph Fourier in 1997. She followed this with a post-doctoral fellowship at the University of Pennsylvania in 1998. From 1998 to 2004, she lectured at the Université Louis-Pasteur in Strasbourg, where she worked in the fields of materials science and biomaterials. In 1998, she joined the Université de Montpellier as a professor in the Biology and Health department. She created a team in cellular biophysics and biomimicry and while there she won the Prix Jean-Marc Lhoste from the Société française de biophysique. She was a junior member of the Institut universitaire de France from 2007 to 2012. In 2008, she returned to Grenoble to become a professor at PHELMA and led a team within the LMGP on the study of the interfaces between materials and biological matter. In 2016, she had a sabbatical as visiting professor at Boston University with the support of a scholarship from the Fulbright Commission. Her work has focused on the engineering of biomaterials to control cell growth and the growth of tissue in vivo, as well as experimental biophysical models. She was appointed as a senior member of the Institut universitaire de France for the period 2016-2021.

Her research projects have been awarded European Research Council funding four times, in 2009 (biomimetic films and membranes), in 2012 (osteo-inductive coating of orthopaedic and dental implants), 2015 (bio-active coatings) and 2017 (regenerating large bone defects). She has had numerous responsibilities at national and international level, notably as an expert in biophysics and biomaterials for the CNU (French National University Council) and the CNRS (French National Centre for Scientific Research) national committee) or international (European funding agencies) organizations. She is the author or co-author of more than a hundred publications, including articles in major scientific journals and two American/European patents.

== Awards ==
- Le Prix Jeune Chercheur de la Société de Biomécanique [young researcher prize of the Society of Biomechanics]
- 2012 Chevalier d'Ordre national du Mérite (Knight of the National Order of Merit).
- 2016 Médaille d'argent du CNRS [CNRS Silver Medal] from the Institut national de chimie [Institute of Chemistry].
- 2019 Prix Émilia Valori pour l'application des sciences [Émilia Valori prize for the application of science] from the Académie des sciences
