= Helvetica Chimica Acta =

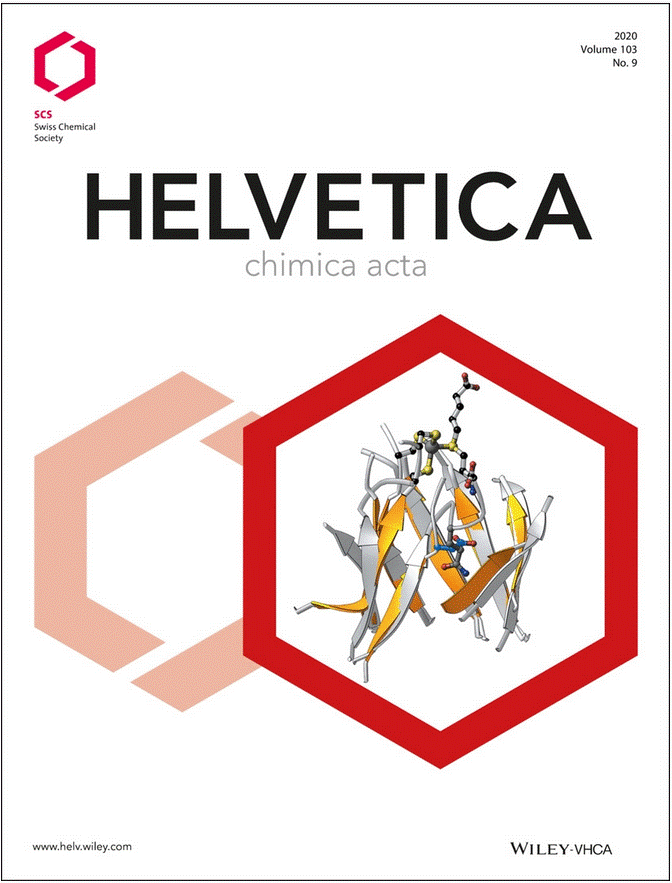
- Discipline: Chemistry
- Language: English
- Edited by: Eva Hevia, Jérôme Waser

Publication details
- History: 1918–present
- Publisher: John Wiley & Sons (Switzerland)
- Frequency: Monthly
- Impact factor: 1.5 (2023)

Standard abbreviations
- ISO 4: Helv. Chim. Acta

Indexing
- ISSN: 0018-019X

Links
- Journal homepage

Helvetica Chimica Acta is a peer-reviewed scientific journal of chemistry established by the Swiss Chemical Society. It is published online by John Wiley & Sons. The journal has a 2023 impact factor of 1.5.

== History ==
- August 6, 1901: Founding of the Swiss Chemical Society
- 1911: IUPAC refused SCG as a member, no own journal
- September 11, 1917: SCG founded HCA
- 1917–1948: First editor-in-chief: Friedrich Fichter (1869–1952)
- Spring 1918: Fasciculus I of Volume I of HCA was issued
- 1948–1971: Emile Cherbuliez (1891–1985)
- 1970: English allowed as fourth language
- 1971–1983: Edgardo Giovannini (1909–2004)
- 1983–2015: M. Volkan Kisakürek
- 2015-2016: Richard J. Smith
- 2016–2021: Jeffrey W. Bode and Christophe Copéret
- 2022–present: Eva Hevia and Jérôme Waser
