= Don Piccard =

American balloonist inventor

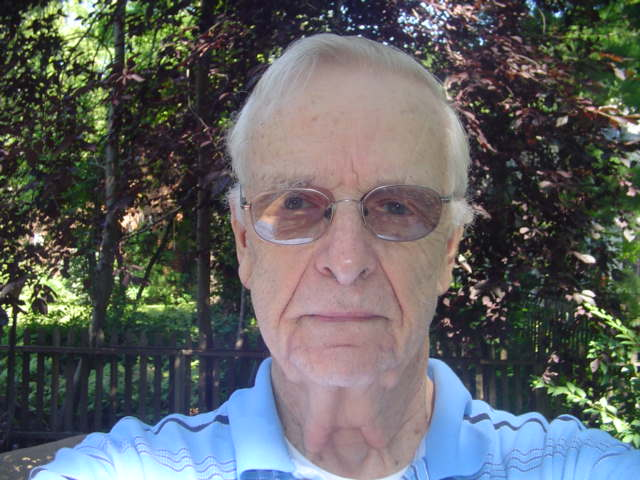
- Born: January 13, 1926; Lausanne, Vaud, Switzerland
- Died: September 13, 2020 (aged 94); Saint Paul, Minnesota, US
- Education: University of Minnesota; Swarthmore College
- Occupation: Aviator
- Known for: Balloon pioneer Montgolfier Diploma (1962)
- Parents: Jean Felix Piccard (father); Jeanette (Ridlon) Piccard (mother)
- Relatives: Auguste Piccard; Jacques Piccard; Bertrand Piccard

Donald Louis Piccard (January 13, 1926 – September 13, 2020) was a Swiss-born American balloon pioneer, promoter, innovator, designer, builder, and pilot.

Piccard was born in Lausanne, Switzerland to Jean Felix Piccard and Jeanette (Ridlon) Piccard. He became a naturalized United States citizen in 1931. Don Piccard first flew in a balloon in 1933, when he was enlisted as "crew" by his mother. She was the first woman to fly to the edge of space and the first American woman to earn a balloon pilot's license. Don Piccard served as a balloon and airship rigger in the United States Navy during World War II and at Naval Air Station Lakehurst during the Korean War.

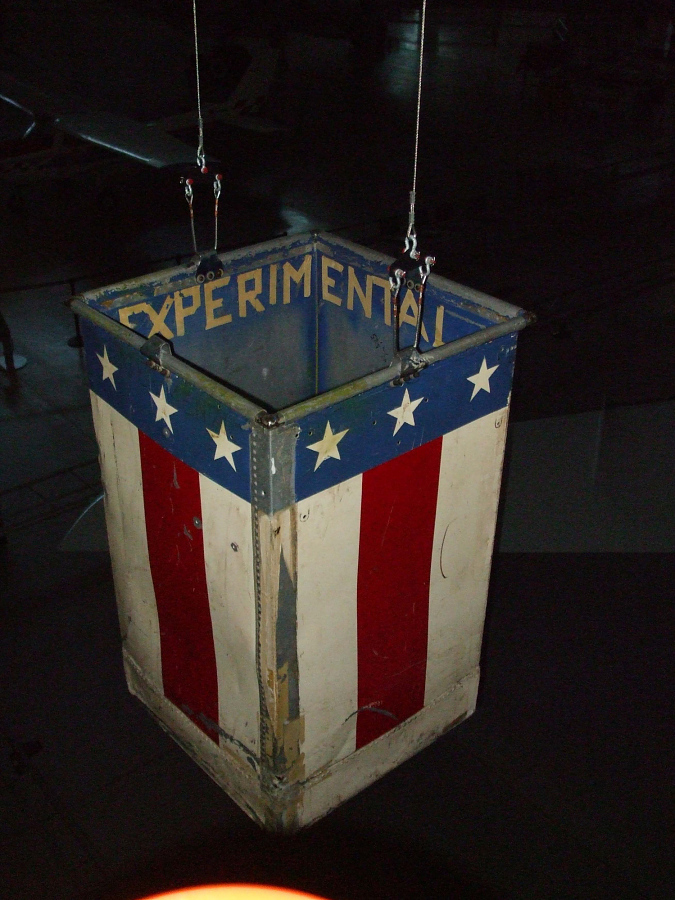
1959 Balloon Gondola, Don Piccard

== First post-World War II balloon free flight ==
Despite not graduating, Piccard was one of the driving forces behind the ballooning revival after the war while a student at the University of Minnesota. He made the first post-war free flight on February 16, 1947 with a captured Japanese Fu-Go balloon, earning his balloon pilot certification from the Civil Aeronutics Authority. In 1948, Piccard organized the first balloon club in the United States, the Balloon Club of America. This club, along with the Balloon Flyers of Akron, formed the United States national ballooning organization the Balloon Federation of America.

On August 17, 1959, Piccard flew a red, white and blue balloon basket at a centennial commemoration of John Wise's Jupiter balloon flight of United States mail. In the same basket he set a gas balloon world record altitude of 34,642 feet on July 19, 1961 from Faribault, Minnesota.

Piccard pioneered plastic and Mylar balloons for superpressure balloons. In 1962, he set a new altitude record for a second-class free flight balloon, climbing to 17,000 feet.

== Hot air ballooning ==
In 1962, he founded the nation's first hot-air balloon race at the St. Paul Winter Carnival. On 13 April 1963, Piccard and Ed Yost were the first people to cross the English Channel in a hot air balloon. Also in 1963 at Kalamazoo, Michigan, Piccard clerked the first National Aeronautic Association-recognized National Hot Air Balloon Championship.

Piccard worked on thermal balloons at Raven Industries from 1962-1964. At Raven, he is credited with making hot air balloons safer by the use of load tapes, lobular gore design, light weight long life fabric and non-conductive materials. Most notably load tapes in the design and construction of balloons receives credit as the single greatest factor in hot air balloon safety and is used in today’s manufacturing. Piccard is also credited with the rapid delation concept, which is superior and safer than the 1970 balloon parachute top design. He also promoted ballooning as a sport and in 1964 started designing balloons through his company Piccard Balloons, eventually incorporating in 1972. In 1985 he sold the Federal Aviation Authority balloon type-certificates to Galaxy Balloons and The Balloon Works.

Piccard appeared as himself on the November 13, 1961 episode of the CBS gameshow To Tell the Truth. He also appeared as a "Mr. X" guest on What's My Line on September 1, 1963, where he stated he was from Sioux Falls, South Dakota.

Piccard died in St. Paul, Minnesota in 2020 at the age of 94.

== Piccard Balloons ==
Piccard Balloons was an American manufacturer of hot air balloons. Don Piccard, descended from a long line of aeronauts, built and sold some of the first modern hot air balloons, beginning in the mid-1960s.

== Piccard family ==
- Auguste Piccard (physicist, balloonist, hydronaut)
  - Jacques Piccard (hydronaut)
    - Bertrand Piccard (psychiatrist, balloonist)
- Jean Felix Piccard (organic chemist and balloonist; twin brother of Auguste)
- Jeannette Piccard (wife of Jean Felix) (balloonist)
  - Don Piccard (balloonist; son of Jean and Jeannette, nephew of Auguste)

== See also ==
- John Wise (balloonist)
- List of English Channel crossings by air
