= Jean Piccard =

American academic and balloonist (1884–1963)

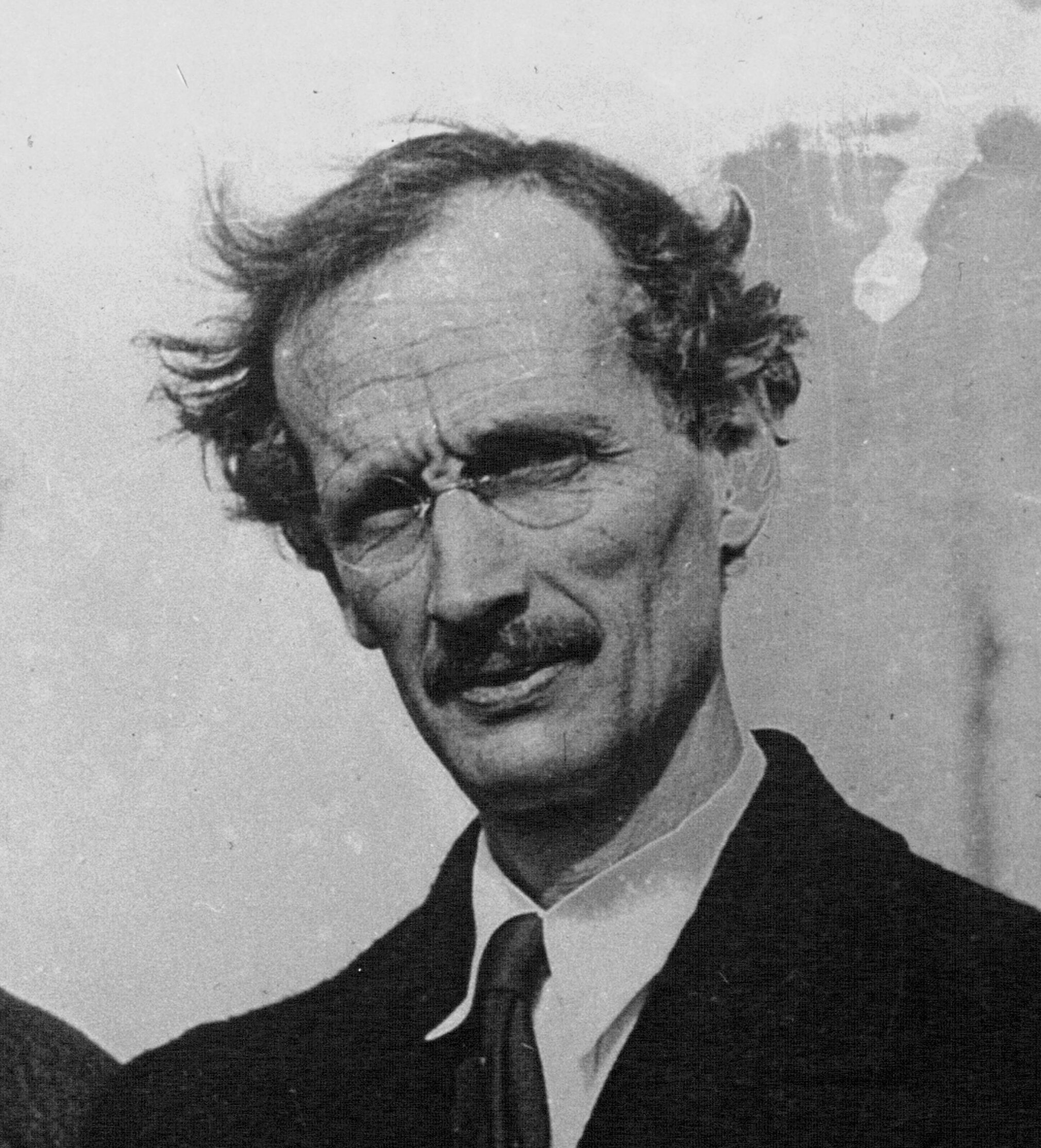
- Piccard in 1933
- Born: January 28, 1884; Basel, Switzerland
- Died: January 28, 1963 (aged 79); Minneapolis, Minnesota, U.S.
- Occupations: chemist, engineer, professor and balloonist
- Spouse: Jeannette Ridlon (m. 1919)
- Children: Don Piccard (son)
- Relatives: Auguste Piccard (brother); Jacques Piccard (nephew)
- Scientific career
- Education: ETH Zurich
- Fields: Inorganic chemistry
- Workplaces: Ludwig-Maximilians-Universität München, University of Lausanne, University of Chicago, University of Minnesota
- Thesis: Ueber Konstitution und Farbe der Chinonimine (1909)
- Doctoral advisor: Richard Willstätter

Jean Felix Piccard (28 January 1884 in Basel, Switzerland – 28 January 1963 in Minneapolis, Minnesota), also known as Jean Piccard, was a Swiss-born American chemist, engineer, professor and high-altitude balloonist. He invented clustered high-altitude balloons, and with his wife Jeannette, the plastic balloon. Piccard's inventions and co-inventions are used in balloon flight, aircraft and spacecraft.

== Family ==
Piccard and Jeannette Ridlon met at the University of Chicago where he taught and where she received her master's degree. They married and had three sons, John, Paul and Donald, and also had foster children.

== Stratosphere flight ==
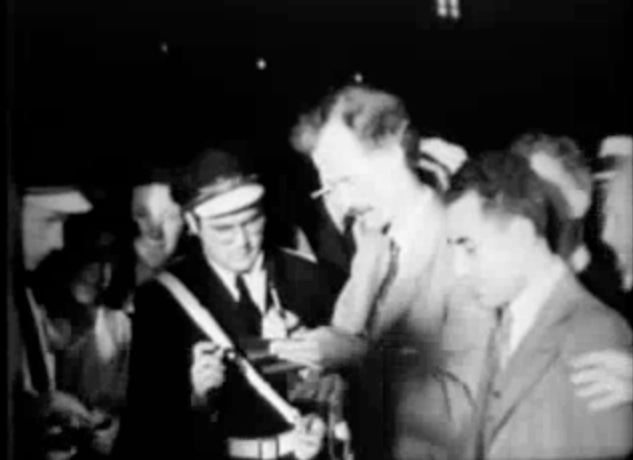
Piccard signing autographs at the 1933 Chicago World's Fair

Piccard was the co-pilot for his wife Jeannette on the third and final voyage of the Century of Progress. The largest balloon in the world was conceived for him to fly at the World's Fair in 1933 but was flown there by US Navy pilots who were licensed. After this flight he created the liquid oxygen converter when the liquid failed to vaporize on descent after the cabin doors were open. Piccard developed a frost-free window, that was used on this flight and later by the Navy and Air Force in the Consolidated B-24 Liberator or Martin B-26 Marauder. He used blasting caps and TNT for releasing the balloon at launch and for remote release of external ballast from inside the sealed cabin. This was the first use of pyrotechnics for remote-controlled actuating devices in aircraft, an unpopular, revolutionary idea at the time. Later his student Robert R. Gilruth, who became the director of the NASA Manned Spacecraft Center, approved and used them in spacecraft.

The July 21st, 1952 issue of The Canberra Times newspaper printed an incorrect front-page article in which Piccard claimed it would be possible for humans to fly to Mars with balloons as early as 1954, if anyone was willing to invest $250,000. Piccard had claimed he would study the light from Mars through a spectroscope to try to find evidence of oxygen and water at a high altitude to ensure his measurements were as precise as possible.

== Plastic balloons ==
Jean Piccard (left) with his brother Auguste (right) during World War I

In 1935 and 1936, to reduce weight and thus enabling a balloon to reach higher altitudes, plastic balloon construction began independently by Max Cosyns in Belgium, Erich Regener in Germany, and Thomas H. Johnson and Jean Piccard, then at the Franklin Institute's Bartol Research Foundation in Swarthmore, Pennsylvania. Johnson suggested cellophane to Jean Piccard.

Piccard with his wife co-invented the plastic balloon and he designed and on 24 June 1936 flew a cellophane balloon built by his students. The balloon was unmanned, 25 feet (7.6 meters) wide, and made of tapered 33-foot (10-meter) gores and one-inch (2.54-cm) 3M Scotch transparent tape. Jean Barnhill, Harold Larson and Lloyd Schumacher cut the gores that fit together like an "orange peel." Harold Hatlestad built the radio equipment and Robert Silliman built the telemeter that sent temperature and pressure data back. Robert Hatch and Silliman maintained radio contact from a station on the roof of the university armory until the radio's battery froze from insufficient insulation. The balloon floated at 50,000 feet, and in ten hours traveled over 600 miles to near Huntsville, Arkansas.

== Cluster balloons ==
Developed with John Akerman of the University of Minnesota and piloted by Jean Piccard in 1937 in Rochester, Minnesota, the first multi-celled balloon was called The Pleiades and was made of 98 latex rubber balloons. In a letter to Robert Gray of the Dewey and Almy Chemical Co. later published in Time magazine, Piccard describes how he broke balloons with a hunting knife and revolver to control his descent. A TNT charge released the cluster as he expected but sent burning excelsior down that destroyed the first Pleiades. He suggested to Gray that rock wool in place of excelsior would prevent similar accidents in the future.

Balloon research stopped for the most part during World War II.

In February 1946 with Otto C. Winzen, Jean Piccard proposed manned flight to the US Navy using clustered balloons made of thin plastic. In June the Office of Naval Research approved Project Helios and that year General Mills and the University of Minnesota contracted to build a cluster of 100 polyethylene balloons for atmospheric research. Helios was designed to reach 100,000 feet for ten hours with a payload of instruments.

Jean Piccard helped Winzen design the Skyhook polyethylene balloons that replaced Project Helios in 1947. Skyhook balloons were used unmanned for atmospheric research by the Navy and for manned flights by the US Air Force. Later Jean Piccard developed electronics for emptying ballast bags.

Piccard died on January 28, 1963 (his 79th birthday) in Minneapolis.

== Piccard family ==
- Jules Piccard (professor of chemistry)
  - Auguste Piccard (physicist, aeronaut, balloonist, hydronaut)
    - Jacques Piccard (hydronaut)
      - Bertrand Piccard (aeronaut, balloonist)
  - Jean Felix Piccard (organic chemist, aeronaut, and balloonist)
  - Jeannette Piccard (wife of Jean Felix) (aeronaut and balloonist)
    - Don Piccard (balloonist)

== Legacy ==
In 1991, Piccard was inducted into the International Air & Space Hall of Fame at the San Diego Air & Space Museum. Gene Roddenberry named the Star Trek character Jean-Luc Picard after either Jean or his twin Auguste, and it is implied that the character is a descendant of one of the brothers. The Swiss explorer and environmentalist Bertrand Piccard claims that it was after his great-uncle Jean Piccard.
