= Auguste Piccard =

Swiss physicist, inventor, and explorer

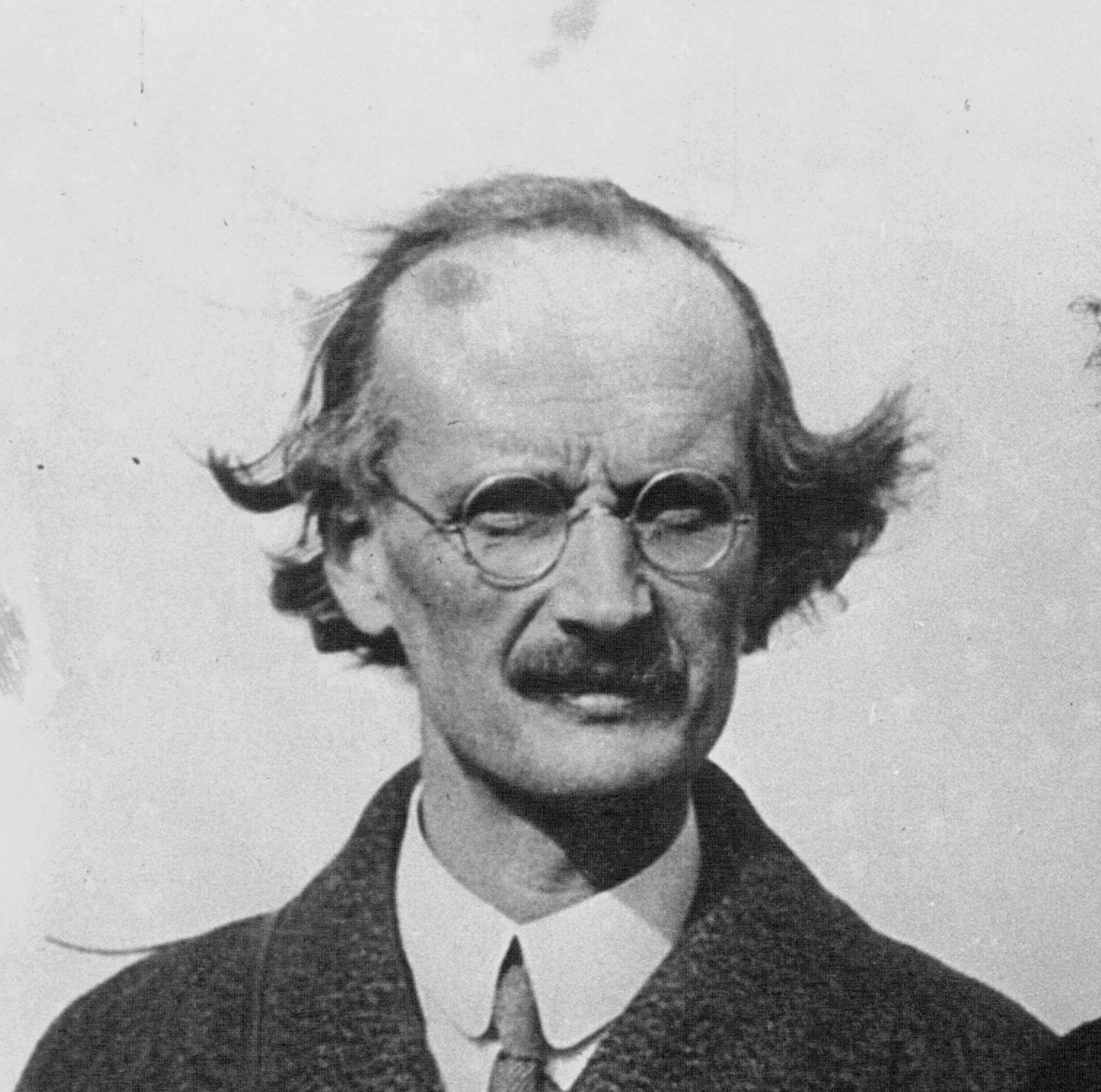
- Piccard in 1933
- Born: Auguste Antoine Piccard; 28 January 1884; Basel, Switzerland
- Died: 24 March 1962 (aged 78); Lausanne, Switzerland
- Known for: Bathyscaphe; Magnetocaloric effect
- Children: Jacques Piccard (son)
- Relatives: Jean Piccard (brother); Bertrand Piccard (grandson); Don Piccard (nephew)
- Scientific career
- Education: ETH Zurich
- Fields: physics, inventor, explorer
- Workplaces: Free University of Brussels (now Université libre de Bruxelles and Vrije Universiteit Brussel)

Signature
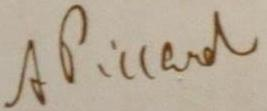

Auguste Antoine Piccard (28 January 1884 – 24 March 1962) was a Swiss physicist, inventor and explorer known for his record-breaking hydrogen balloon flights, with which he studied the Earth's upper atmosphere and became the first person to enter the stratosphere. Piccard was also known for his invention of the first bathyscaphe, FNRS-2, with which he made a number of unmanned dives in 1948 to explore the ocean's depths.

Piccard's twin brother Jean Felix Piccard is also a notable figure in the annals of science and exploration, as are a number of their relatives, including Jacques Piccard, Bertrand Piccard, Jeannette Piccard and Don Piccard.

== Biography ==
Piccard and his twin brother Jean Felix Piccard were born in Basel, Switzerland, on 28 January 1884.

Showing an intense interest in science as a child, he attended the Swiss Federal Institute of Technology (ETH) in Zürich and became a professor of physics in Brussels at the Free University of Brussels in 1922, the same year his son Jacques Piccard was born. He was a member of the Solvay Congress of 1922, 1924, 1927, 1930 and 1933.

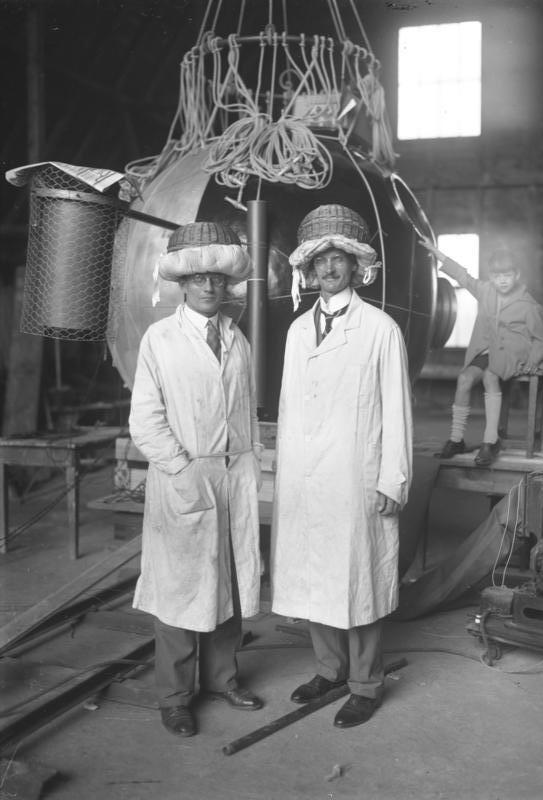
Auguste Piccard and Paul Kipfer, wearing improvised crash helmets, September 1930

In 1930, an interest in ballooning and a curiosity about the upper atmosphere led him to design a spherical, pressurized aluminum gondola that would allow ascent to a great altitude without requiring a pressure suit. Supported by the Belgian Fonds National de la Recherche Scientifique (FNRS), Piccard constructed his gondola.

An important motivation for his research in the upper atmosphere was measurements of cosmic radiation, which were supposed to give experimental evidence for the theories of Albert Einstein, whom Piccard knew from the Solvay conferences and who was a fellow alumnus of ETH.

"A huge yellow balloon soared skyward, a few weeks ago, from Augsberg, Germany. Instead of a basket, it trailed an air-thin black-and-silver aluminum ball. Within [the contraption] Prof. Auguste Piccard, physicist, and Charles Kipfer aimed to explore the air 50,000 feet up. Seventeen hours later, after being given up for dead, they returned safely from an estimated height of more than 52,000 feet, almost ten miles, shattering every aircraft altitude record."

— Popular Science, August 1931

On 27 May 1931, Auguste Piccard and Paul Kipfer took off from Augsburg, Germany, in a hydrogen balloon, and reached a record altitude of 15,781 m (51,775 ft; 9.806 mi) (FAI Record File Number 10634). During this flight, they became the first human beings to enter the stratosphere, and were able to gather substantial data on the upper atmosphere, as well as measure cosmic rays.

In the mid-1930s, Piccard's interests shifted when he realized that a modification of his high-altitude balloon cockpit would allow descent into the deep ocean. By 1937, he had designed the bathyscaphe, a small steel gondola built to withstand great external pressure. Construction began, but was interrupted by the outbreak of World War II. Resuming work in 1945, he completed the bubble-shaped cockpit that maintained normal air pressure for a person inside the capsule even as the water pressure outside increased to over 46 MPa (6,700 psi). Above the heavy steel capsule, a large flotation tank was attached and filled with a low density liquid for buoyancy. Liquids are relatively incompressible and can provide buoyancy that does not change as the pressure increases. And so, the huge tank was filled with gasoline, not as a fuel, but as flotation. To make the now floating craft sink, tons of iron were attached to the float with a release mechanism to allow resurfacing. This craft was named FNRS-2 and made a number of unmanned dives in 1948 before being given to the French Navy in 1950. There, it was redesigned, and in 1954, it took a man safely down 4,176 m (13,701 ft).

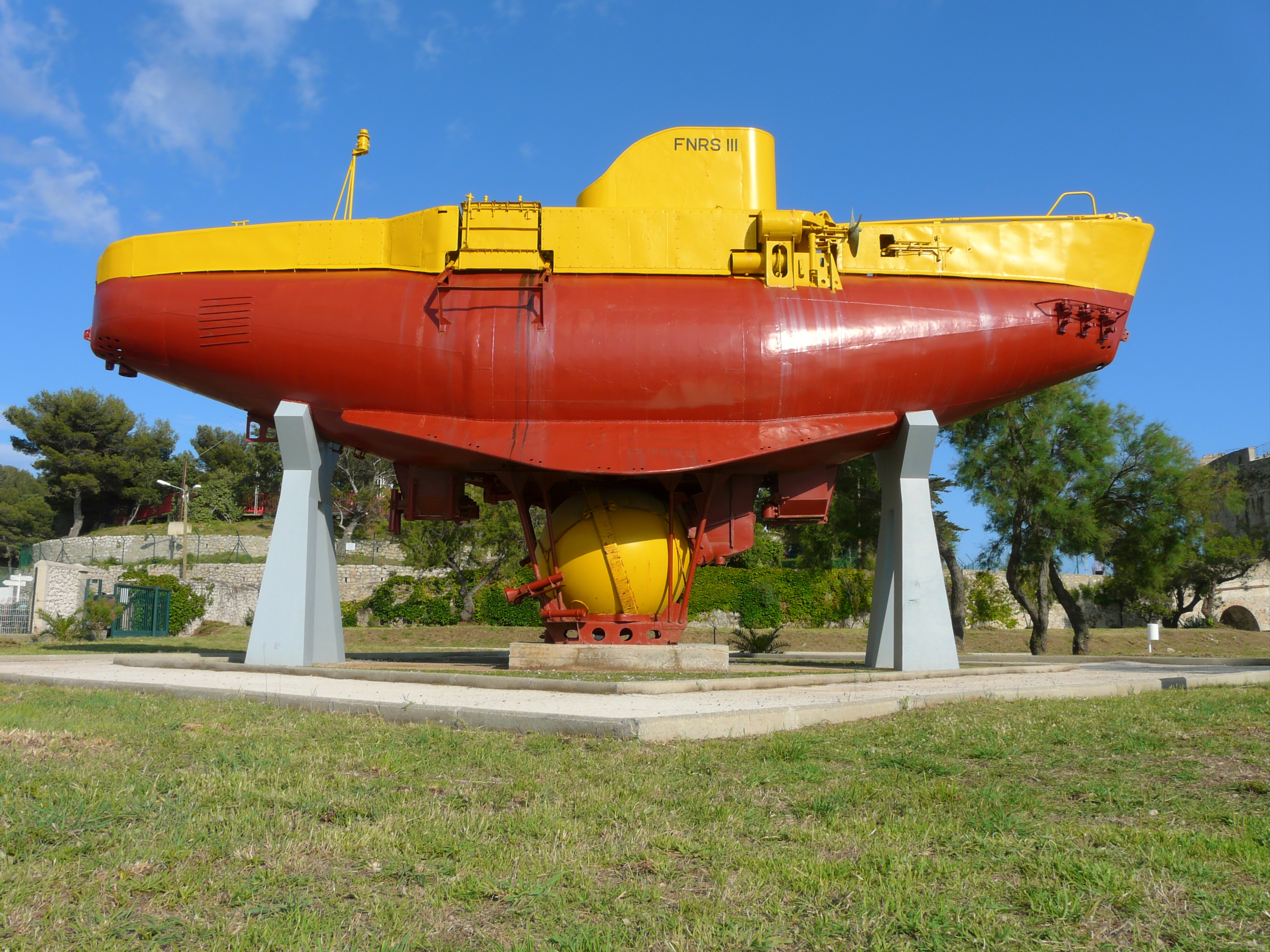
The FNRS III at the Tour Royale in Toulon, France

Piccard and his son, Jacques, built a second bathyscaphe and together they dove to a record-breaking depth of 3,150 m (10,335 ft) in 1953.

Auguste Piccard died on 24 March 1962 of a heart attack at his home in Lausanne, Switzerland; he was 78 years old.

== Piccard family ==
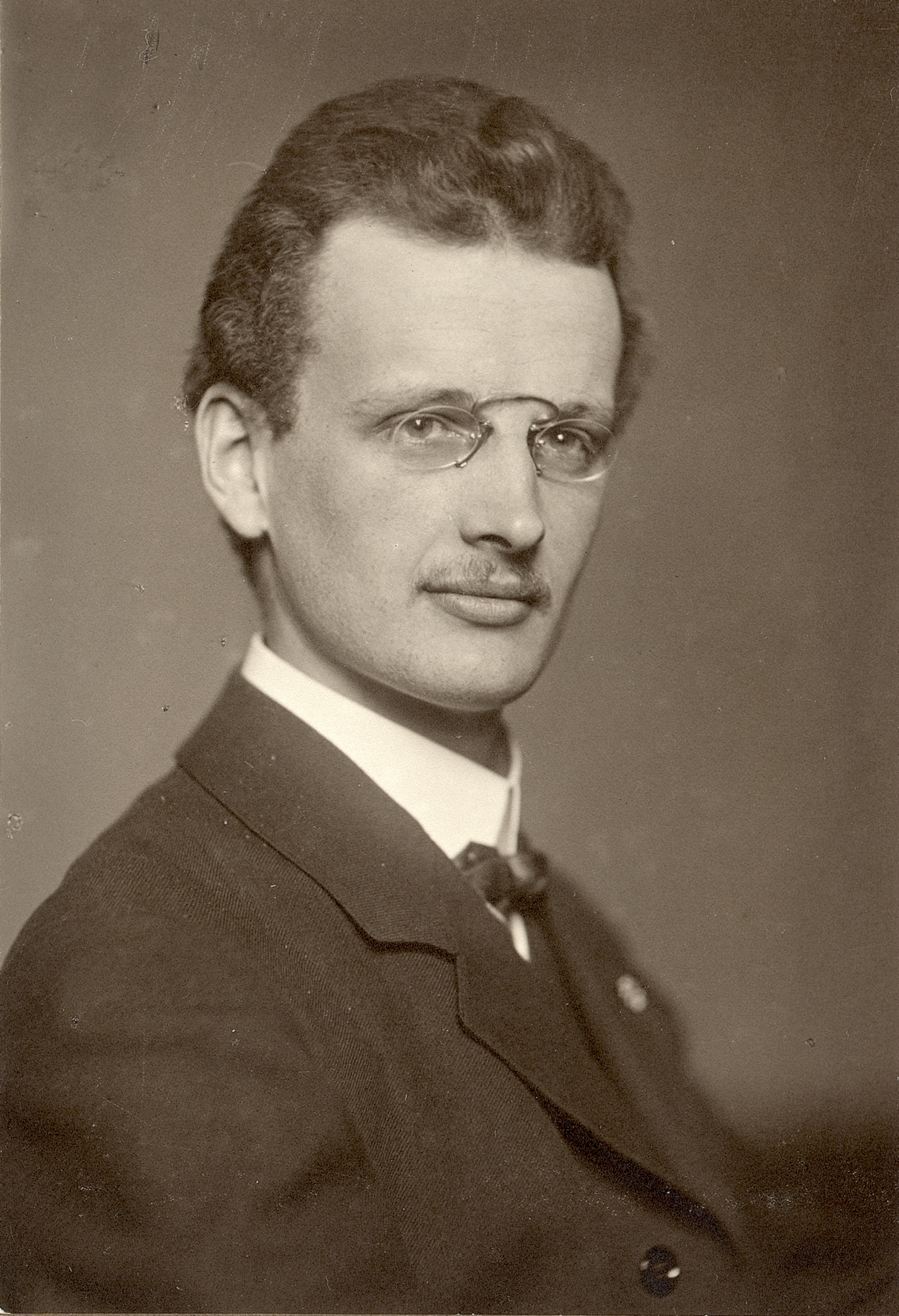
Auguste Piccard in 1910

- Jules Piccard (professor of chemistry)
  - Auguste Piccard (physicist, aeronaut, balloonist, hydronaut)
    - Jacques Piccard (hydronaut, engineer, oceanographer)
      - Bertrand Piccard (aeronaut, psychiatrist, balloonist)
  - Jean Felix Piccard (organic chemist, aeronaut, and balloonist)
  - Jeannette Piccard (wife of Jean Felix) (aeronaut and balloonist)
    - Don Piccard (balloonist)

== References in popular culture ==
- Auguste Piccard was the inspiration for Professor Cuthbert Calculus in The Adventures of Tintin by Belgian cartoonist Hergé. Piccard held a teaching appointment in Brussels where Hergé spotted his unmistakable figure in the street. This connection was confirmed by Hergé in an interview with Numa Sadoul:

Calculus is a reduced scale Piccard, as the real chap was very tall. He had an interminable neck that sprouted from a collar that was much too large... I made Calculus a mini-Piccard, otherwise I would have had to enlarge the frames of the cartoon strip.

- Gene Roddenberry named Captain Jean-Luc Picard in Star Trek after one or both of the twin brothers Auguste and Jean Felix Piccard, and derived Jean-Luc Picard from their names.
- Will Gregory's opera, Piccard in Space, premiered at the Queen Elizabeth Hall in London on 31 March 2011. The libretto, by Hattie Naylor, focuses on Auguste Piccard's first balloon ascent with his assistant Paul Kipfer, and on the theories of Albert Einstein and Isaac Newton, who both appear as characters in the drama.
- In 2016, the exploits of Piccard and his son Jacques were featured in an American television commercial for Hennessy cognac.

== See also ==
- List of firsts in aviation

Preceded by Hawthorne C. Gray	Human altitude record 1931-1932; With: Paul Kipfer	Succeeded by Auguste Piccard and Max Cosyns
Preceded by Auguste Piccard and Paul Kipfer	Human altitude record 1932-1933; With: Max Cosyns	Succeeded by USSR-1
