= Jean-Michel Picart =

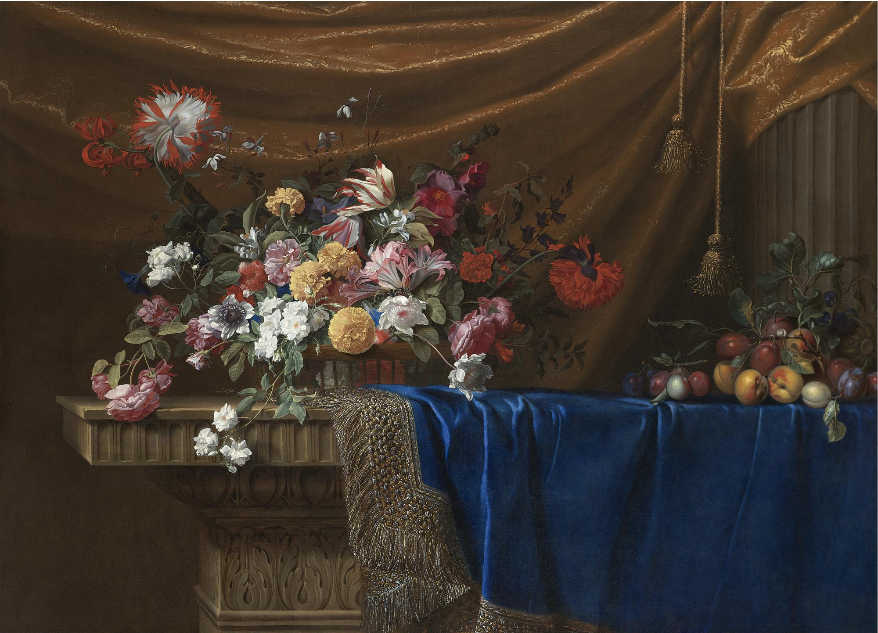
Still life of a basket of flowers and a mound of fruit on a sculpted stone table, partly covered

Jean-Michel Picart or Jean-Michel Picard (Antwerp, c. 1600 – Paris, 24 November 1682) was a Flemish still life painter and art dealer active in France. After training in Antwerp, he moved to Paris where he had a brilliant career and became court painter to King Louis XIV. He is known for his flower and fruit still lifes. He was together with Jean-Baptiste Monnoyer one of the most successful still life painters in France in his time. As an art dealer he was a link between Antwerp dealers and the Paris market.

== Life ==
Little is known about the life of the artist. He was likely born in Antwerp around the year 1600. The original name of the artist has not been preserved. He adopted a French form of his Flemish name after he moved to France. There is no record of his registration with the Antwerp Guild of Saint Luke.

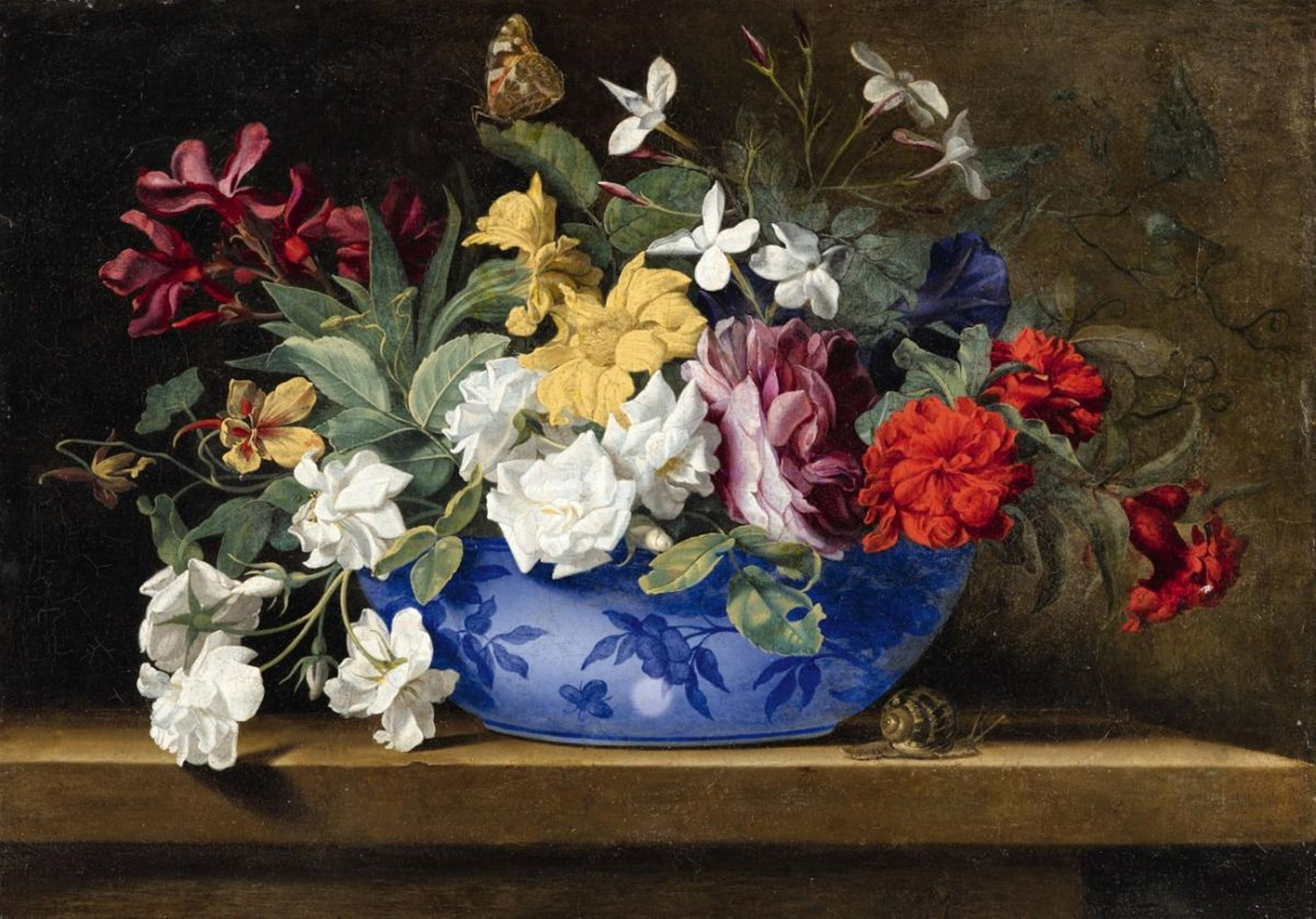
Floral still life with a snail and butterfly

Jean-Michel Picart left Antwerp and moved to Paris where he is recorded from the 1630s. He was an active member of the community of painters of Flemish origin who had settled in Saint-Germain-des-Prés. He was active as a flower painter and enjoyed the patronage of Gaston Henri de Bourbon, the nominal bishop of Metz and later Duke of Verneuil. By 1638, Picart had become one of the most prominent figures among the community of still life painters from Flanders and Holland who had settled in Paris. In 1640, Picart was admitted to the Académie de Saint-Luc (Academy of Saint Luke), the guild of painters and sculptors of Paris.

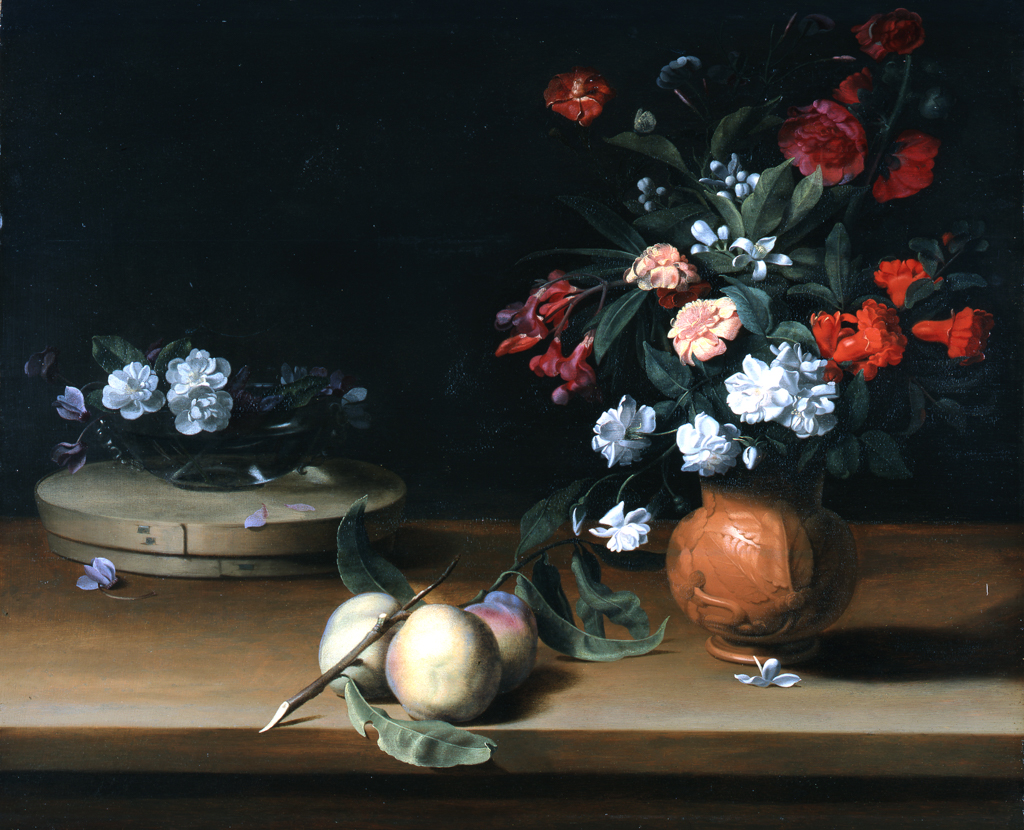
Still life of flowers and fruit

The French chronicler André Félibien described Picart in his 1666-8 treatise Entretiens sur les vies et sur les ouvrages des plus excellents peintres anciens et modernes as one of the important artists of his time who ran a workshop of painter copyists hailing mostly from Flanders or the Dutch Republic. Picart was renowned for his activity as a merchant of original works and copies. He dealt in Dutch and Flemish landscapes, hunting scenes by Frans Snyders and small religious compositions. As an art dealer he was also sought out for his specialist expertise. For instance, on the occasion of the death of Henrietta of England he was called upon as an expert to assess her art collection. As an art dealer he remained in contact with Antwerp art dealers such as Matthijs Musson. Correspondence between the two art dealers shows that Picart would inform Musson of prevailing preferences in the Paris art market and Musson would then organise for the making of the pictures that fit with those preferences.

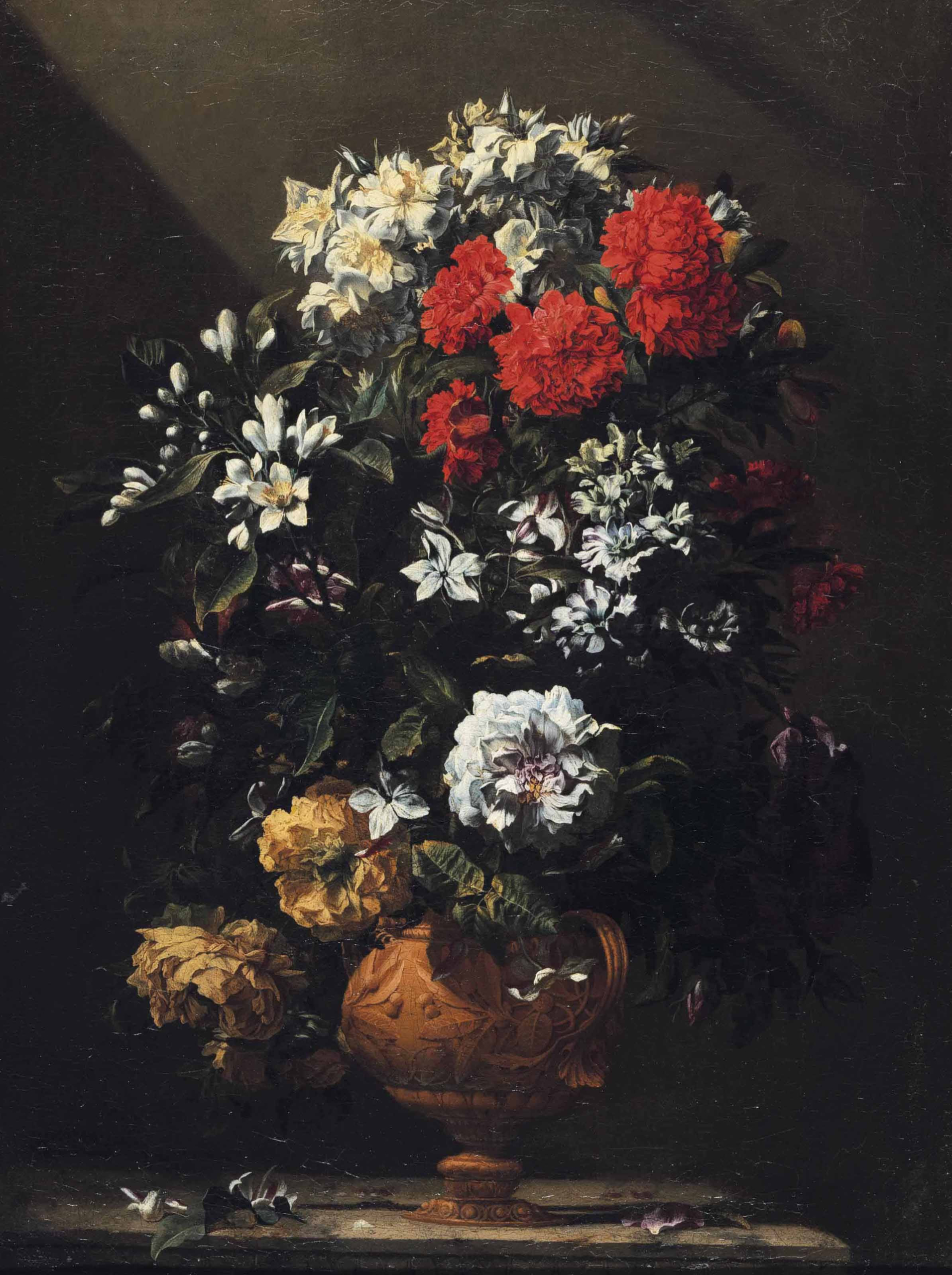
Carnations and other flowers in a bronze vase

Jean-Michel Picart married and became widowed three times. His first wife was Marie Marguillier with whom he had a son in 1636. He married a second time on 15 November 1640 to Jeanne Cholin, who was buried on 15 June 1644. A daughter was born from this union. His last marriage with Marie Richard contracted in 1645 lasted for 35 years and produced four daughters and two sons. The documents regarding his civil status on the occasion of his marriages or those of his relatives give an insight into the life of the artist. Starting from his second marriage, he built strong relationships with the local stonecutters, jewellers and engravers of fine stones. He was the father-in-law of the portraitist Jacques d'Agar, who had studied with the Flemish painter Jacob Ferdinand Voet and later became portrait painter to the court of Denmark. Another daughter married the miniature painter Sylvain Bonnet in 1672. The Flemish painter Philippe de Champaigne and the French flower painter Nicolas Baudesson as well as magistrates and officers appear in various notarial deeds relating to Picart. This confirms the social rise of the artist.

In 1651, Picart became a member of the Académie royale de peinture et de sculpture. Later he was named by king Louis XIV 'Peintre du Roy' (Painter to the King) in 1671, then 'peintre ordinaire du roi' (ordinary painter to the king) from 1679 to 1682. Picart painted still lifes for the king of which at least seven were on display at the Palace of Versailles and another eight at the king's smaller retreat Château de Marly.

The artist was active in Paris until his death on 24 November 1682.

== Work ==
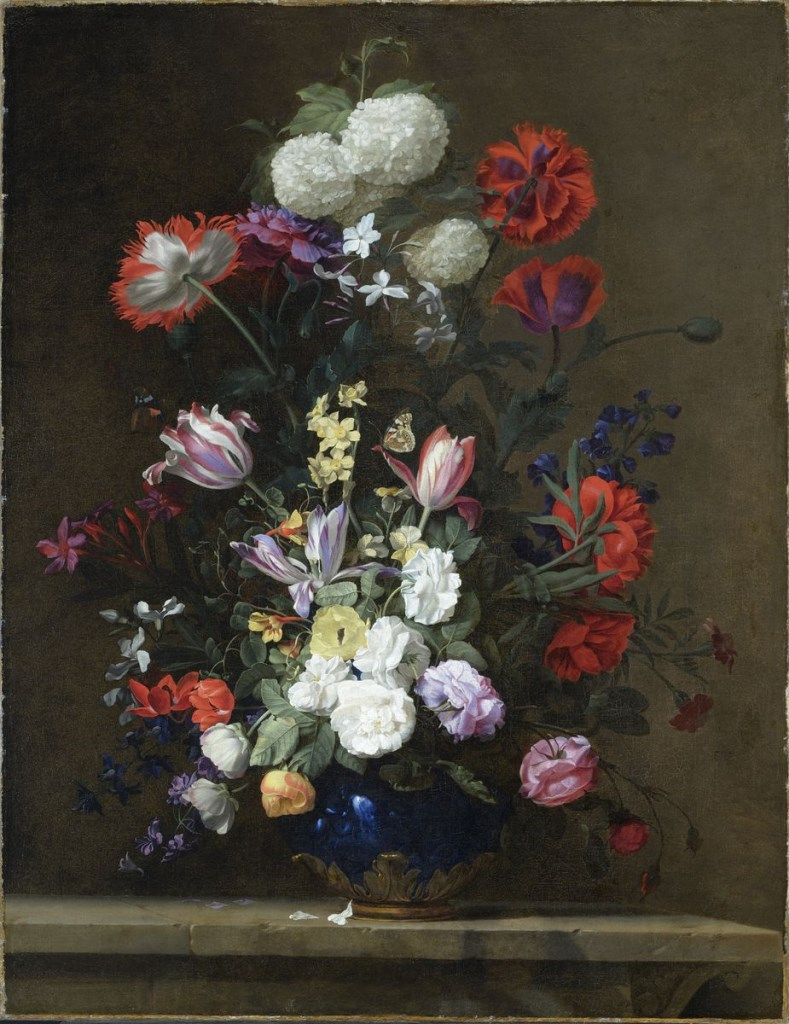
Bouquet of flowers in a vase decorated with gilt bronze

Only a few of Picart's works are dated. A Bouquet of flowers in a vase decorated with gilt bronze (1648, Museum of Fine Arts of Lyon) is a rare signed and dated work. According to Curt Benedict, it was the Still life of flowers in a glass vase of the Musée d'art moderne et contemporain de Saint-Étienne Métropole, which allowed the French art historian Michel Faré to attribute a number of works to Picart.

Picart's style stayed generally close to the contemporary style of flower painting practised in Antwerp, especially that of Jan van Kessel the Elder. His early work such as the Fruit still life with grapes and peaches (c. 1635, Staatliche Kunsthalle Karlsruhe) follows an archaic type. Later he was able to merge his Flemish realism with its painstaking attention to detail with the demand at the court of Louis XIV for more extravagant, lush floral arrangements.

The artist was particularly skilled in creating subtly different harmonics, a feature that would mark French still-life painting. Picart liked to use dramatic lighting to bring his flower pieces to life. His ability to render every detail meticulously can be seen in the Still life with spring flowers on a ledge (early 1650s, at Dorotheum Vienna on 25 April 2017, lot 93) in which he carefully depicts the defects on the fruit peel as well as the withering leaves and the rich cloth covering the table and the curtains in the background. Some art historians have interpreted some of the images in these flower pieces (such as withering flowers, butterflies) as symbols for the transience of life.
