= Picard (surname) =

Picard is a surname of multiple possible origins. It may be a toponymic surname meaning a person from Picardy or a French-language nickname derived from pic, "pick, pike" with pejorative suffix .ard. It may be an English surname, a variant of Pickard. It is also possible that it is derived from an olf Germanic dithematic name with stems bic (poited weapon) and hard (brave, strong). Notable people with the surname include:

- Alexandre R. Picard (1985–), French Canadian professional ice hockey defenseman
- Alexandre Picard (ice hockey) (1985–), French Canadian professional ice hockey wing
- Alfred Christopher Picard (1824–1855), New Zealand politician
- Andrew Comrie-Picard (1971–), Canadian race car driver and actor
- Barbara Leonie Picard (1917–2011), British author
- Béatrice Picard (1929–2025), Canadian actress
- Bob Picard (1949–), American professional football player
- Catherine Picard (1952–), French politician
- Colette Picard (1913–1999), French archaeologist
- Émile Picard (1856–1941), French mathematician
- Ernest Picard (1821–1877), French politician
- François Picard (racing driver) (1921–1996), French racing driver
- François Picard (naturalist) (1879–1939), French naturalist
- François Picard (journalist), Franco-American journalist
- Gilbert Charles-Picard (1913–1998), French historian and archaeologist, husband of Colette Picard
- Henri Picard (1916–1944), Belgian fighter pilot
- Henri Picard (actor)
- Henry Picard (1906–1997), American professional golfer
- Henry Picard (Lord Mayor), Lord Mayor of London in 1356 and 1357
- Henry Pickard (1832-1905), English cricketer and clergyman
- Irving Picard (born 1941), American lawyer known for his recovery of funds in the Madoff investment scandal
- Jean Picard, French bookbinder (active to 1547) commissioned by patrons such as Jean Grolier
- Jean Picard (1620–1682), French astronomer
- Jean-Michel Picard (Antwerp, c. 1600 – Paris, 24 November 1682), a Flemish still life painter and art dealer
- Laurent Picard (1927–2012), French Canadian businessman
- Liza Picard (1927–2022), English historian
- Louis-Benoît Picard (1769–1828), French playwright
- Luc Picard (1961–), French Canadian actor and comedian
- Manuela Weichelt-Picard (born 1967), Swiss politician
- Marc Picard (1955–), Canadian politician
- Marcelline Picard-Kanapé (1941–), Canadian educator and politician
- Michel Picard (1969–), French Canadian professional ice hockey wing
- Olivier Picard (1940–2023), French Hellenist, son of Colette and Gilbert (see above)
- Paul-Henri Picard (1923–2002), Canadian politician
- Pauline Picard (1947–2009), French Canadian politician
- Pauline Picard (1919/1920–1922), Breton child who was found dead
- Raymond Picard (1917–1975), French literary scholar
- Robert G. Picard (1951–), American writer and scholar
- Robert Picard (1957–), French Canadian professional ice hockey defenseman
- Rosalind Picard (1962–), American electrical engineer and professor
- Thierry Picard (1956–2025), French international rugby union player
- Timothée Picard (1975–), French music critic

== Fictional characters ==
- Picard family, a fictional family in Star Trek, introduced in Star Trek: The Next Generation, see List of Star Trek characters (N–S)
  - Jean-Luc Picard, a Starfleet captain in the Star Trek franchise

== See also ==
- Picard, Piccard, Pickard, Picardi, Piccardi, Picardo, Piccardo, Picart, Piccart, Pycard
