= Pickard =

Pickard is a surname of multiple possible origins, similar to Picard, mostly meaning a person from Picardy. Notable people with the surname include:

- Al Pickard (1895–1975), Canadian ice hockey administrator and president of the Canadian Amateur Hockey Association
- Bob Pickard (American football) (born 1952), American football player
- Calvin Pickard (born 1992), Canadian ice hockey player
- Charles Pickard (1915–1944), Royal Air Force officer
- Chet Pickard (born 1989), American hockey player
- Cyril Stanley Pickard (1917–1992), British diplomat
- Felicity Pickard (born 1994), British para table tennis player
- Greenleaf Whittier Pickard (1877–1956), American radio pioneer
- Hannah Maynard Pickard (1812–1844), American school teacher, preceptress, author
- James Pickard, English inventor
- Jan Pickard (1927–1998), South African rugby player
- Jerry Pickard (1940–2021), Canadian politician
- John Pickard (American actor) (1913–1993), American actor
- John Pickard (composer) (born 1963), British composer
- John Pickard (British actor) (born 1977), British actor
- John Pickard (politician) (1824–1883), Canadian politician
- Judy Pickard (1921–2016), New Zealand abstract painter, librarian and advocate for women's rights
- Keith Pickard (born 1962), American politician
- Louise Pickard (1865–1928), British artist
- Neil Pickard (1929–2007), Australian politician
- Percy Pickard (1915–1944), Royal Air Force officer
- Thomas J. Pickard (born 1950), director of the Federal Bureau of Investigation
- Tom Pickard (born 1946), British poet
- Tony Pickard (born 1934), English tennis coach
- Troy Pickard (1973–2022), Australian local government politician and businessman
- William Leonard Pickard (born 1945), American convicted for manufacturing LSD

== See also ==
- Picard, Piccard, Pickard, Picardi, Piccardi, Picardo, Piccardo, Picart, Piccart, Pycard
- Pickard, Indiana, a small town in the United States
- Pickard-Cambridge, a surname
- Thornton-Pickard, a former British manufacturer of photographic cameras
- Pickard China, American china company
