= Piccardi =

Piccardi is a surname. Notable people with the surname include:

- Alvaro Piccardi (1941–2025), Italian actor and director
- Giorgio Piccardi (1895–1972), Italian physicist and chemist
- Leopoldo Piccardi (1889–1974), Italian politician and civil servant

== See also ==
- Picard, Piccard, Pickard, Picardi, Piccardi, Picardo, Piccardo, Pycard
