= Piccardo =

Piccardo is a surname meaning a person from Picardy, a historical region and cultural area of France. Notable people with the surname include:

- Antonio Ochoa Piccardo (born 1956), Venezuelan architect
- Giacomo Piccardo, Italian footballer
- Hamza Roberto Piccardo (born 1952), Italian Islamic leader
- Juan Manuel Cat Piccardo (born 1996), Uruguayan rugby union player
- Justo Piccardo (born 2002), Argentine rugby player
- Matteo Piccardo, Italian footballer
- Sébastien Piccardo, French cyclist

== See also ==
- Picard, Piccard, Pickard, Picardi, Piccardi, Picardo, Piccardo, Picart, Piccart, Pycard
