= Picardi =

Picardi is an Italian surname. Notable people with the surname include:

- Adrian Picardi (born 1987), American filmmaker
- Eva Picardi (1948–2017), Italian philosopher
- Francesco Picardi (1928–2012), Italian politician
- John C. Picardi, American playwright
- Phillip Picardi, American magazine editor
- Vincenzo Picardi (born 1983), Italian boxer

== See also ==
- Picard, Piccard, Pickard, Picardi, Piccardi, Picardo, Piccardo, Pycard
- Picardy (disambiguation)
