= Picardo =

Picardo is an Italian surname, meaning a person from Picardy, a historical region and cultural area of France. Notable people with the surname include:

- Fabian Picardo (born 1972), Gibraltarian politician and barrister
- José Luis Picardo (born 1919), Spanish architect, muralist, draughtsman and illustrator
- Robert Picardo (born 1953), American actor and singer

== See also ==
- Picard, Piccard, Pickard, Picardi, Piccardi, Picardo, Piccardo, Pycard
- Picardo Farm, in Wedgwood, Seattle, Washington
