= Pycard =

English or French Medieval and Renaissance transitional composer

Pycard, also spelt Picard and Picart (late 14th century – early 15th century) was an English or French Medieval and Renaissance transitional composer.

He may have served in John of Gaunt's household in the 1390s as 'Jehan Pycard alias Vaux'. The name "Picard" suggests a French origin, but his music is regarded as being in an English tradition. He is one of the most prolific composers represented in the Old Hall Manuscript (British Library: Additional 57950), with nine works from it attributed to him. His music is in the ars nova style, and is unusual in its virtuosity.

A Gloria by Pycard in the Old Hall Manuscript illustrates the sophistication of his isorhythmic techniques. Each quarter note in the lower part equals 4½ quarter notes in the upper parts, creating an uneven ratio of 4:9 that causes the parts to lose synchronization. The lower part then steadily contracts in a series of Pythagorean proportions (12:9:8:6) until the parts come back into alignment. Indeed, Taruskin writes:

So sophisticated is this music, so given was Pycard to mathematical and canonic wizardry in the other eight pieces preserved under his name in Old Hall, and so suspiciously Gallic is his name (cf. the ancient northern-French province of Picardie), that it has been suggested that he was actually a French composer whose works are preserved for some reason in an English manuscript (and in only one other, a fragment, also English).

== See also ==
- PYCARD
- Picard, Piccard, Pickard, Picardi, Piccardi, Picardo, Piccardo, Pycard
