= Jules Piccard =

Swiss chemist (1840–1933)

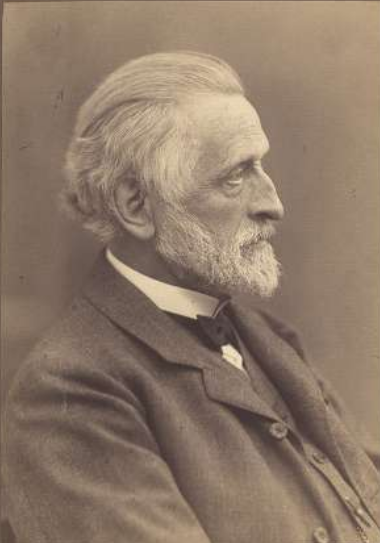
Jules Piccard

Jules Piccard, also known as Julius Piccard (20 September 1840, in Lausanne – 11 April 1933, in Lausanne) was a Swiss chemist. He was the father of twins Auguste Piccard (1884–1962) and Jean Felix Piccard (1884–1963), both renowned balloonists.

He studied chemistry at the University of Heidelberg as a student of Robert Bunsen, receiving his doctorate in 1862. Shortly afterwards, he obtained his habilitation at the polytechnical institute in Zürich. From 1869 to 1903 he was a professor of chemistry at the University of Basel.

He made contributions in the field of food chemistry and in his research of cantharidin, dinitrocresol, chrysin and resorcinol. He is also known for his studies involving the atomic weight of rubidium.

== Selected writings ==
- De l'évaluation mécanique des surfaces planes, (with S. Cuénoud 1861) – On the mechanical evaluation of plane surfaces.
- Beiträge zur Kenntniss der Rubidiumverbindungen, 1862 – Contributions regarding rubidium compounds.
- L'avenir de l'agriculture d'après M. de Liebig : compte-rendu de l'introduction à la septième éd. de son ouvrage sur la Chimie agricole, 1862 – The future of agriculture in regards to Justus von Liebig.
- Chemisch-geognostische Mittheilungen, 1866 – Chemical-geognostic reports.
- Bernoullianum : Anstalt für Physik, Chemie und Astronomie an der Universität Basel : Beschreibung und Pläne (with Eduard Hagenbach-Bischoff and Johann Jacob Stehlin, 1876) – Bernoullianum Institute of Physics, Chemistry and Astronomy at the University of Basel.
- Produits chimiques et pharmaceutiques : rapport, 1879 – Chemical and pharmaceutical products.
- Rapport supplémentaire sur la question des brevets d'invention appliqués aux industries chimiques, 1881 – Supplementary report on the question of patents for the chemical industry.
- Louis Rütimeyer, 1897 – Biography of Ludwig Rütimeyer.
