= National Register of Historic Places listings in Warren County, Iowa =

Location of Warren County in Iowa

This is a list of the National Register of Historic Places listings in Warren County, Iowa.

This is intended to be a complete list of the properties and districts on the National Register of Historic Places in Warren County, Iowa, United States. Latitude and longitude coordinates are provided for many National Register properties and districts; these locations may be seen together in a map.

There are 11 properties and districts listed on the National Register in the county, and two former listings.

This National Park Service list is complete through NPS recent listings posted November 21, 2025.

== Current listings ==
	Name on the Register	Image	Date listed	Location	City or town	Description
1	Coal Creek Bridge	Coal Creek Bridge	May 15, 1998 (#98000473)	2404 Fillmore St. over Coal Creek; 41°25′44″N 93°20′46″W	Carlisle	
2	Hoosier Row School	Hoosier Row School	June 23, 2011 (#11000393)	15246 County Road R63; 41°18′15″N 93°37′02″W	Indianola vicinity	
3	Indianola Carnegie Library	Indianola Carnegie Library	September 5, 2017 (#100001568)	106 W. Boston Ave. 41°21′45″N 93°33′43″W	Indianola	
4	Indianola High School	Indianola High School	October 24, 2002 (#02001247)	301 N. Buxton; 41°21′46″N 93°33′45″W	Indianola	
5	Lake Ahquabi State Park, Picnic Area (Area A)	Lake Ahquabi State Park, Picnic Area (Area A)	November 15, 1990 (#90001663)	1650 118th Ave. 41°17′23″N 93°35′01″W	Indianola	
6	Lake Ahquabi State Park, Bathhouse Area (Area B)	Lake Ahquabi State Park, Bathhouse Area (Area B)	November 15, 1990 (#90001664)	1650 118th Ave. 41°17′25″N 93°35′25″W	Indianola	
7	Lake Ahquabi State Park, Refectory Area (Area C)	Lake Ahquabi State Park, Refectory Area (Area C)	November 15, 1990 (#90001665)	1650 118th Ave. 41°17′19″N 93°35′25″W	Indianola	
8	Octagon Barn, Otter Township	Octagon Barn, Otter Township	June 30, 1986 (#86001448)	Off Iowa Highway 205; 41°16′07″N 93°26′35″W	Otter Township	
9	Palmyra Methodist Episcopal Church	Palmyra Methodist Episcopal Church	October 1, 1979 (#79000945)	Southwest of Hartford; 41°26′04″N 93°26′05″W	Palmyra	
10	Science Hall	Science Hall	May 8, 1991 (#91000535)	Simpson College campus 41°21′54″N 93°34′25″W	Indianola	
11	United Presbyterian Church, Summerset	United Presbyterian Church, Summerset	November 7, 1976 (#76000811)	U.S. Route 65; 41°28′16″N 93°33′38″W	Scotch Ridge	

== Former listing ==
	Name on the Register	Image	Date listed	Date removed	Location	City or town	Description
1	Polled Hereford Breed Origin Site	Polled Hereford Breed Origin Site	June 24, 1983 (#83000408)	November 21, 2025	Southwest of Indianola; 41°15′32″N 93°40′54″W	Indianola	
2	Warren County Court House	Warren County Court House	August 28, 2003 (#03000818)	September 19, 2019	115 N. Howard Ave. 41°21′40″N 93°33′41″W	Indianola	It was a part of the PWA-Era County Courthouses of IA MPS. Because of mold and other issues the building was demolished in 2019.

== See also ==
- List of National Historic Landmarks in Iowa
- National Register of Historic Places listings in Iowa
- Listings in neighboring counties: Clarke, Lucas, Madison, Marion, Polk
