= Coal Creek Bridge =

Coal Creek Bridge may refer to:

- Coal Creek Covered Bridge, formerly listed on the National Register of Historic Places in Parke County, Indiana
- Coal Creek Bridge (Carlisle, Iowa), formerly listed on the National Register of Historic Places in Warren County, Iowa
