= Susan Stuebner =

American academic administrator

President of Simpson College
- Incumbent
- Assumed office July 28, 2025
- Preceded by: Terry Handley (acting)

9th President of Colby–Sawyer College
- In office July 1, 2016 – June 2024
- Preceded by: Tom Galligan
- Succeeded by: Laura A. Sykes (interim)

Personal details
- Born: 1970 or 1971 (age 55–56)
- Children: 2
- Education: Dartmouth College; Harvard University

Susan D. Stuebner (born 1970 or 1971) is an American academic administrator serving as the president of Simpson College. She was previously the ninth president of Colby–Sawyer College from 2016 to 2024. Stuebner has held senior administrative positions at Allegheny College, where she served as executive vice president and chief operating officer, and at Lycoming College, where she was vice president for administration and planning.

== Early life and education ==
Stuebner was born 1970 or 1971. She is a native of Deephaven, Minnesota. She attended Dartmouth College, where she was a member of the women's basketball team for four years, graduating in 1991 with an A.B. in psychology.

Stuebner completed graduate studies at the Harvard Graduate School of Education, earning a Master of Education (Ed.M.) in administration, planning, and social policy, and a Doctor of Education (Ed.D.) in higher education. Her master's thesis in 2001 was titled, "A literature review of regional private liberal arts colleges and presidential power." Her doctoral studies were completed in 2003, and her committee chair was Richard P. Chait. Her 2003 doctoral dissertation, published under the name Susan Stuebner Gaylor, was titled, "Context Matters: Understanding Presidential Power at Three, Private, Regional, Liberal Arts Colleges."

During her doctoral studies, Stuebner served as an academic counselor at Dartmouth College from 2000 to 2002, a freshman proctor and director of freshman intramurals at Harvard College, and a special assistant to the president at Wheelock College. She was a teaching fellow at the Harvard Graduate School of Education.

== Career ==
Stuebner's research and professional interests center on leadership, decision-making, and the sustainability of regional private liberal arts colleges. She began her career at Albright College with concurrent roles as head women's basketball coach, admissions counselor, and special assistant to the academic dean. She also held early positions at Carleton College.

Stuebner spent a decade at Lycoming College, where she concluded her tenure as vice president for administration and planning. She then moved to Allegheny College to serve as executive vice president and chief operating officer. At Allegheny, she supervised vice presidents across multiple divisions, including finance, human resources, and admissions, and chaired the president's senior staff, strategic planning, and finance committees. During her time in Pennsylvania, she also served as a member of visiting teams for the Middle States Commission on Higher Education.

=== Colby–Sawyer College ===
On July 1, 2016, Stuebner became the ninth president of Colby–Sawyer College, where she also held the Volanakis Family Presidential Chair and served as a professor. She was a professor of social sciences and education and a professor of business and social sciences. She held the presidency for eight years, until 2024. During her tenure, she implemented two strategic plans, doubled the college's endowment from $30 million to $64 million, established a partnership with Dartmouth Health, and introduced 12 new graduate and professional programs.

While serving as president of Colby–Sawyer College, Stuebner participated in regional and national higher education governance. She served on the NCAA Division III Presidents Advisory Group, the Council of Independent Colleges (CIC) Board of Directors, the executive committee of the New Hampshire College & University Council (NHCUC), and the executive committee for NH Campus Compact. She was also a commissioner on the New Hampshire Department of Education's Commission on Higher Education, a corporator for Mascoma Bank, and chaired site visit teams for the New England Commission of Higher Education (NECHE).

In April 2024, it was announced that Stuebner had accepted the position of 21st president of Marietta College, with an intended start date of July 15, 2024. In June 2024, Marietta College announced that Stuebner would not be taking the position due to "an unforeseen change in personal considerations." After stepping down from Colby–Sawyer College, she stayed on to advise the interim president, Laura A. Sykes.

=== Simpson College ===
In July 2025, Simpson College announced Stuebner as its interim president for the 2025 to 2026 academic year. Her term began on July 28, 2025. Stuebner was appointed Simpson College 26th president on Nov. 25, 2025.

== Personal life ==
Stuebner was married and has two children. She is included on a list of out LGBTQ college presidents and chancellors. As of 2016, her partner is Amanda Wine.
