= Warren County Courthouse (Iowa) =

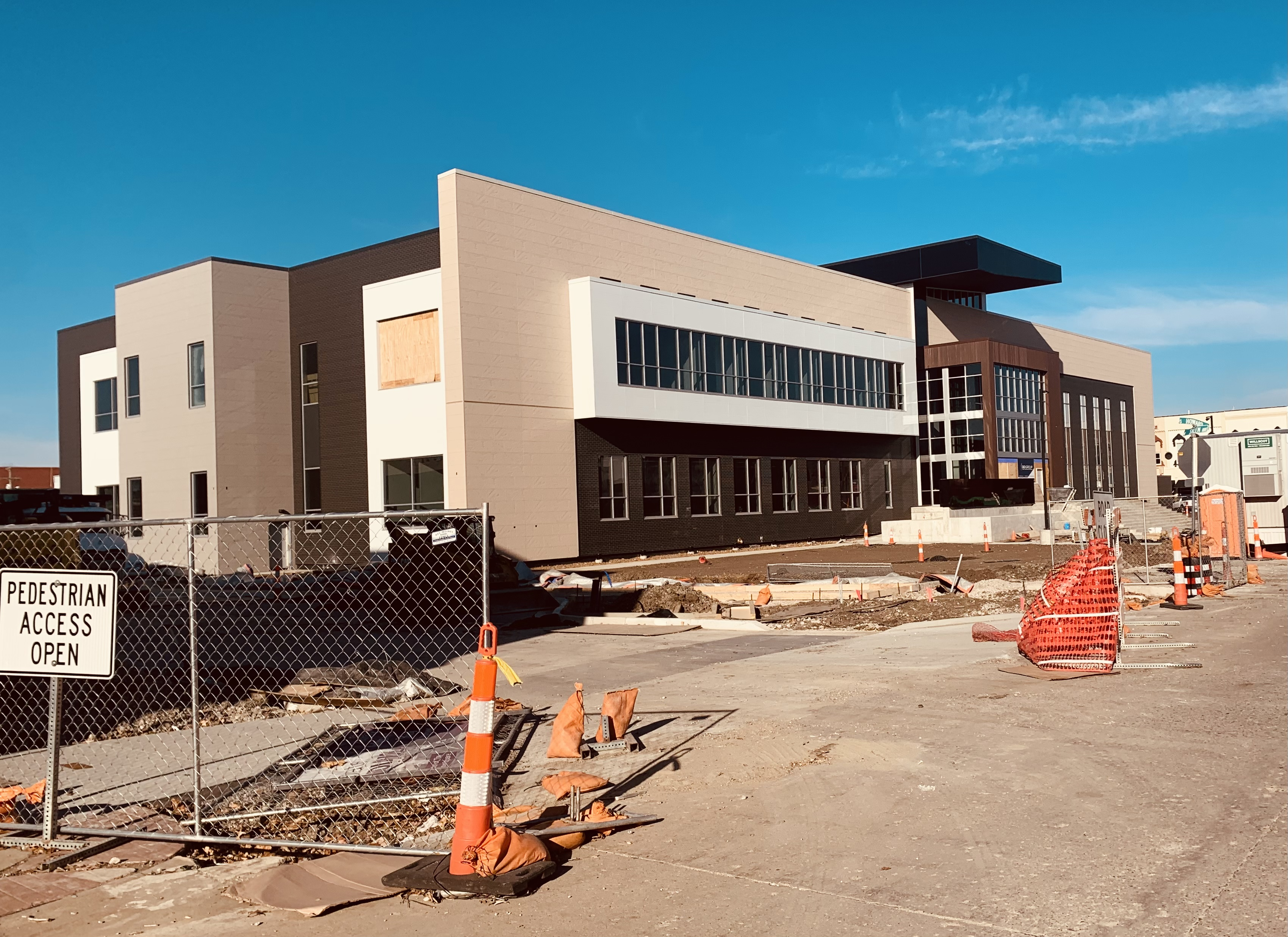
- Courthouse under construction in 2021
- Interactive map of the Warren County Courthouse area

General information
- Type: Courthouse
- Architectural style: Modern
- Location: 115 N. Howard Ave., Indianola, Iowa, United States
- Coordinates: 41°21′40″N 93°33′41″W
- Completed: 2022 (estimated)

Technical details
- Floor count: Two

Design and construction
- Architecture firm: Shive-Hattery
- Warren County Court House
- Formerly listed on the U.S. National Register of Historic Places
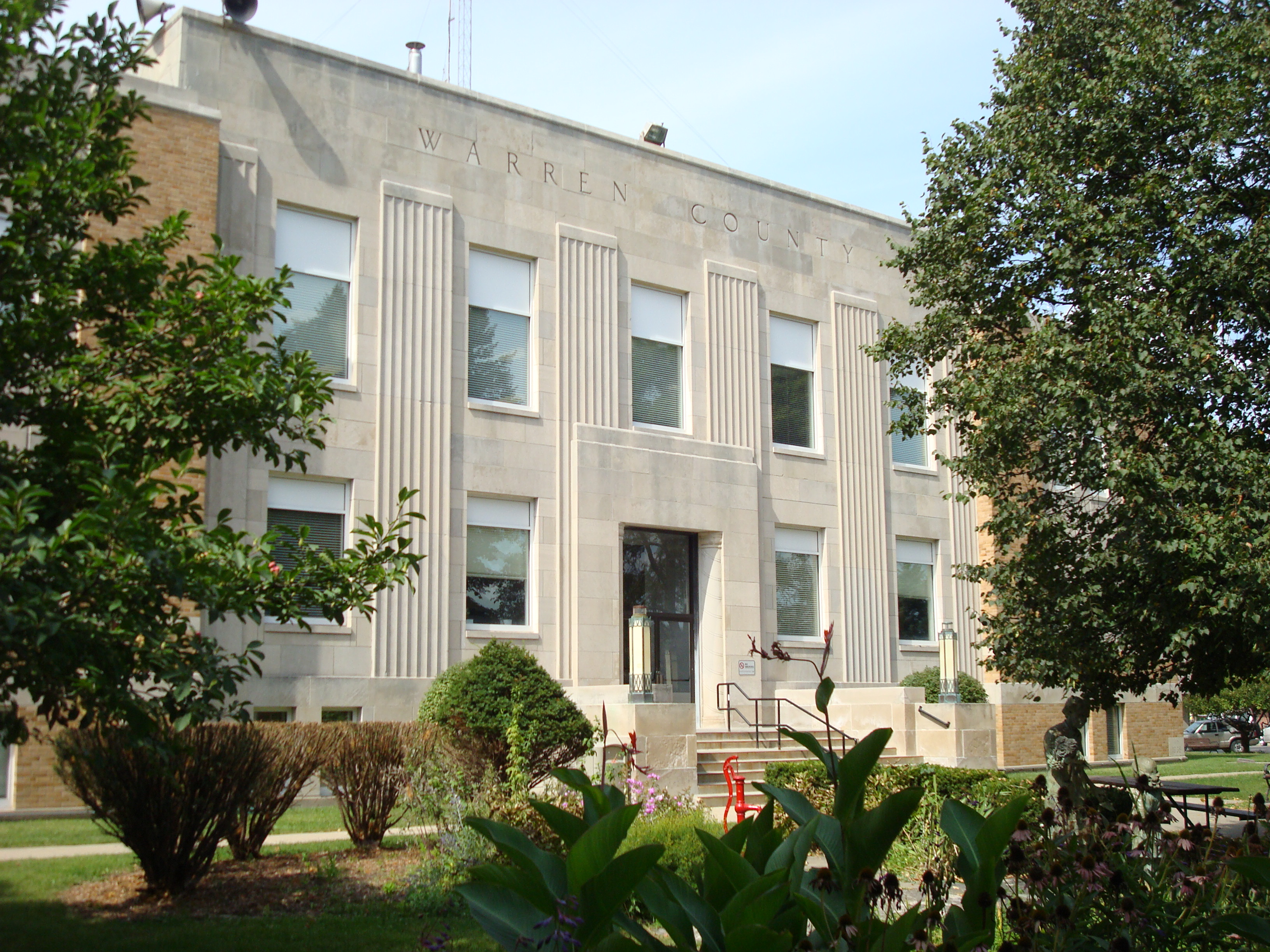
- Area: Less than 10 acres (4.0 ha)
- Built: 1939
- Built by: F.B. Dickinson & Co.
- Architect: Keffer and Jones
- Architectural style: PWA Moderne
- MPS: PWA-Era County Courthouses of IA MPS
- NRHP reference No.: 03000818

Significant dates
- Added to NRHP: August 28, 2003
- Removed from NRHP: September 19, 2019

The Warren County Courthouse is located in Indianola, Iowa, United States. The courthouse that was built in 1939 was listed on the National Register of Historic Places (NRHP) in 2003 as a part of the PWA-Era County Courthouses of IA Multiple Properties Submission. It was the third building the county has used for court functions and county administration. The building was demolished in the summer of 2019 and removed from the NRHP in September of the same year. A new courthouse and justice center opened in July 2022.

== History ==
=== First two courthouses ===
The county's first courthouse was a log cabin built in 1851. It measured 20 by 30 feet (6.1 by 9.1 m). A Victorian structure was built in 1868. Years of neglect weakened the building. Walls started to bulge and part of the building fell onto the sidewalk below.

=== Third courthouse ===
A referendum to build a new courthouse failed in 1936 even though funding from the Public Works Administration (PWA) had been approved to assist with construction costs. A second referendum in 1938 was approved, and PWA funding was again made available. Indianola native Earl Jones of the Des Moines architectural firm Keffer & Jones designed the new building. F.B. Dickinson & Co., of Des Moines, was awarded the contract to build the building and work commenced in October 1938. The cornerstone was laid in December of the same year. The building was constructed for $145,000. The dedication ceremony was held on August 24, 1939. Over 12,000 people participated in the celebration, which included a parade, athletic events, a courthouse tour, concerts, and a street dance. The keynote address was given by John Gross, president of Simpson College.

A 50-by-36-foot (15 by 11 m) law enforcement addition was built onto the rear of the building in 1988. It was designed by the West Des Moines architectural firm of Frevert, Ramsey, Kobes, and built by Ringland Johnson Crowley. The materials used in its construction matched those of the original building. The county acquired the old Indianola High School building in 1998, also listed on the National Register of Historic Places, which was converted into the Warren County Administration Building and houses the county offices.

Concerns from mold in the building began in 2014. The old sewer line into the courthouse disintegrated, which created sewer problems including sewer odor in the building. Iowa's 5th Judicial Court closed court offices in the courthouse section of the building in 2016 because of health concerns associated with the building. The jail was closed two years later because of building code violations. Demolition of the courthouse and jail began in late May 2019.

=== Fourth courthouse ===
Warren County's fourth courthouse was designed by Shive-Hattery of Des Moines. The two-story, 80,000-square-foot (7,400 m^{2}) structure has a full basement, four courtrooms, a county attorney's office, a sheriff's office, and a jail. The building was designed to allow for future expansion if necessary. It is located on the town square in Indianola where the previous courthouse stood. Completion for the estimated $29.9 million project was initially planned for May 2021. Bids for the project, however, came in at $7 million over budget in 2019, and voters that November rejected an additional $3.5 million for the project. After making adjustments to the design, ground was broken for the project in March 2020. An official ceremony had to be postponed because of the COVID-19 pandemic. The building was completed in 2022 and opened on July 1 of that year. The building cost $41 million in total, more than $10 million over the initial budget.

== Architecture ==
=== Third courthouse ===
The architectural style of the building was known as Depression Modern or PWA Moderne. The building featured a symmetrical façade with a central section of two stories that was flanked by two lower sections. It was built over a raised basement. The exterior was composed of buff-colored brick and Bedford limestone trim. On the interior, the central corridors extended the length of the building. Vaults were built into the corners of the structure with the county offices opening onto the corridor. The interior featured multi-colored terrazzo floors, marble wainscoting, and acoustic tile. Originally, the courtroom was decorated in dark wood tones and Art Deco ornamentation. The county jail was located on the third floor.

The building was located on the courthouse square in the central business district where the previous courthouse was also located. The square itself was a contributing site on the building's nomination to the National Register of Historic Places. The corners of the property are rounded. A flagpole, gazebo, flower garden, and parking lot were also located on the square, which was densely covered with trees.
