= Wallace Hall =

Wallace Hall may refer to:

- Wallace Hall (Thornhill), a 2-18 school in Thornhill, Dumfries and Galloway
- Wallace L. Hall Jr., a member of the Board of Regents of the University of Texas System
- Wallace Hall (Simpson College), Indianola, Iowa
