= Hilary Cleveland =

American political scientist

Hilary Cleveland has been a professor of History and Political Science at Colby-Sawyer College in New London, New Hampshire, for over 50 years. She was married to former New Hampshire Republican Congressman James Colgate Cleveland and was sister in law of the late Patience Cleveland. She was born in Orange, N.J. She currently lives in New London, NH.

She was appointed by President Ronald Reagan to serve on the national Advisory Council on Continuing Education. She served under President George H. W. Bush as the finance chair for his New Hampshire primary campaign and one of three commissioners of the International Joint Commission on the United States and Canada. Locally she served as New London's Town Moderator for 18 years, president and trustee of the local historical society, and founding member of the local League of Women Voters and Adventures in Learning.

She made news during the 2004 presidential election when she crossed party lines to support Howard Dean in the primary and later John Kerry. She was interviewed for Newsweek and The Boston Globe as an example of Republican fallout due to the policies of George W. Bush's first presidential term.
