= Associate professor =

Academic rank between the entry grade and full professor

Occupation
- Names: Professor
- Occupation type: Profession
- Activity sectors: Academia

Description
- Competencies: Academic expertise, research, teaching
- Education required: Typically a doctoral degree and a substantial record of scholarship and teaching
- Fields of employment: Academia
- Related jobs: Researcher, Lecturer, Reader

Associate professor is an academic rank used in university systems around the world. It has two distinct principal meanings: one in the North American system and one in the Commonwealth system. In both, this rank sits in the upper-middle of the professorial hierarchy, but its relative seniority differs.

== North American system ==
In the North American system, used in the United States, Canada, and many countries influenced by them, associate professor is the middle of the three principal professorial ranks, above assistant professor and below (full) professor. It is typically the first promotion obtained after entering the professoriate, and in the United States it is the rank at which tenure is ordinarily first conferred given substantial record in original research or creative scholarship, teaching, and service, so that promotion to associate professor and the award of tenure usually coincide. For this reason it is considered as the first of the senior faculty ranks and distinguish them from the junior rank of assistant professor.

=== Relationship to tenure ===
At most research universities in North American a distinct feature of the rank is its association with the award of tenure. Under the framework of the American Association of University Professors' (AAUP) 1940 Statement of Principles on Academic Freedom and Tenure—widely reflected in institutional policy—full-time appointments are either probationary for tenure or tenured, and after a probationary period not exceeding seven years a faculty member should receive continuous tenure, terminable thereafter only for adequate cause or under extraordinary circumstances such as financial exigency. Institutions place the award of tenure at this rank in several ways. For example, at Georgetown University the award of tenure confers at least the rank of associate professor; at the University of Michigan such appointments are made with tenure unless otherwise specified; at New York University only full-time professors and associate professors may hold tenure; and at Brown University the rank "usually carries tenure" and is then of unlimited duration. A tenured appointment continues until resignation, retirement, or dismissal for cause, with tenure residing in the faculty member's department or unit.

Where an associate professorship is tenured, the appointment is of indefinite duration, continuing until resignation, retirement, or dismissal for cause; tenure attaches to the faculty member's academic home (department or unit) rather than to any administrative role.

=== Appointment, promotion, and review ===
Promotion to associate professor with tenure, or appointment to the rank from another institution, generally requires a demonstrated record in original research or creative scholarship, teaching, and service, with scholarship and teaching weighted most heavily. Tenure-track faculty typically enter as assistant professors and serve a fixed probationary period, commonly capped near seven years with review typically in the sixth year, before an "up or out" tenure decision; prior tenure-eligible service elsewhere may be credited toward the period. A case usually passes through a confidential vote of tenured colleagues at or above the rank, letters from external reviewers, and school, college, and university committees, with final authority over tenure resting with the institution's governing board, such as the regents at Michigan, the trustees at Columbia and New York University. Typically, a key criterion is that satisfactory performance alone does not entitle a faculty member to promotion; advancement requires an increased level of substantial demonstrated achievement commensurate with the higher rank.

=== Non-tenure-track uses ===
The same designation is in some cases also used for appointments that do not carry tenure: an initial appointment at the rank may occasionally be made without tenure for a limited term, and in some faculties it is the highest grade available to certain non-tenured faculty. It further appears in modified, non-tenurable tracks marked by a qualifier—clinical associate professor, research associate professor, associate professor of the practice, and visiting or adjunct associate professor. The growth of such fixed-term and contingent appointments has been a major trend in U.S. higher education; by one analysis only about a third of U.S. faculty held tenure-line positions as of fall 2022.

== Commonwealth system ==
In the traditional Commonwealth system, the title associate professor is used in place of reader, ranking above senior lecturer and below (chair) professor and awarded principally for a distinguished record of original research. It is used in this sense most prominently in Australia and New Zealand, and in a number of other Commonwealth systems. Because the (chair) professor title is held by comparatively few academics in this system, the reader and Commonwealth associate professor ranks have no exact North American counterpart; reputable comparisons differ, but the rank is generally placed above the North American associate professor, which corresponds more closely to the Commonwealth senior lecturer. In this system associate professor is typically the second or third promotion after entry, by which point the holder has usually already been a permanent employee at the lecturer and senior lecturer grades.

=== United Kingdom ===
British universities have traditionally used the ladder of lecturer, senior lecturer, reader, and professor (with principal lecturer in some post-1992 institutions), reserving the title "professor" for the most senior staff. Since the 2010s a number of universities have adopted North American–style titles—using "associate professor" in place of senior lecturer or reader—chiefly to make the seniority of their main academic grade legible to international applicants; when the University of Oxford consulted on the change in 2015 it followed institutions including Nottingham and Warwick and argued that overseas candidates mistook its lectureships for junior posts. At Oxford, associate professor is now the main academic grade: holders are appointed for an initial period of up to five years, after which a review may grant tenure (locally termed "reappointment to retirement"), and the reader grade—formerly intermediate between full professor and associate professor—has been discontinued. The University of Cambridge restructured its titles with effect from 1 October 2021, mapping a reader to professor, a university senior lecturer to associate professor, and a university lecturer to associate professor on passing probation (and to assistant professor before it).

=== Australia and New Zealand ===
In Australia and New Zealand, academic posts are classified into five levels, A–E, whose titles may vary slightly between institutions. Associate professor corresponds to Level D—above senior lecturer (Level C) and below professor (Level E)—and is the senior research-and-teaching grade immediately preceding a full professorship. The level structure derives from a common heritage in the British university system and from nationally framed salary classifications; promotion to the rank generally requires an outstanding, internationally recognised contribution to the discipline, with somewhat less emphasis on the leadership expected for a full professorship.

=== Convergence with the North American system ===
Beginning in the mid-2010s, the adoption of North American titles by some institutions, together with the decline of the reader grade, has narrowed the historic distinction between the two systems, so that within a single country institutions may now use different title schemes for equivalent posts.

== Comparison ==
The table presents a broad overview of the traditional main systems. Many institutions use combinations of these systems or other titles, and some universities in Commonwealth countries have adopted the North American system in place of the Commonwealth system.

North American system	Commonwealth system
(Full) Professor (endowed chair) (upper half, including distinguished professor or equivalent)	Professor (chair)
(Full) Professor (lower half)	Reader (or principal lecturer) (mainly UK) or associate professor (traditionally in Australia, Ireland, NZ, South Africa and Southeast Asia)
Associate professor (often the first tenured rank)	Senior lecturer
Assistant professor (typically the entry-level tenure-track position)	Lecturer (typically the first permanent position)
Instructor	Associate lecturer (commonly the entry-level position)

== See also ==
- Academic ranks in the United Kingdom
- Academic ranks (Australia and New Zealand)
- Academic tenure
- Academic tenure in North America
- Assistant professor
- Professor
- Reader (academic rank)
- Senior lecturer
