= Academic ranks (Australia and New Zealand) =

Academic ranks in higher education in Australia and New Zealand derive from a common heritage in the British university system.

== Overview in Australia ==
The system of academic titles and ranks in Australia is classified to a common five levels, A–E (Level E being the highest academic rank), although the titles of these levels may differ between institutions. These are:

- Level A — Associate Lecturer/Research Associate/Postdoctoral Research Fellow
- Level B — Lecturer/Research Fellow
- Level C — Senior Lecturer/Senior Research Fellow
- Level D — Associate Professor/Reader
- Level E — Professor

These levels correspond to salary levels set by the Australian government's Higher Education Academic Salaries Award (2002). There has been a significant increase in academics at level D and E (Associate professor and professor) in recent years, with full time faculty at this level increasing from 16% to 25% of the academic workforce between 1994 and 2021.

In order to receive the title of Professor, the applicant must pass each university's minimum standards statements and promotion policies, which are derived from the Higher Education Academic Salaries award. Three key attributes are examined: recognition, distinction, and leadership. Leadership in research is arguably the most important. Some universities also expect leadership in developing the curriculum and in the teaching and management of staff and students.

The difference between professor and associate professor is that there is less of an imperative to demonstrate leadership qualities for the title of associate professor. Still, in order to receive the title, it is required that the applicant has made an 'outstanding contribution' and that the applicant is usually recognised at a national or international level.

In some universities, the title of professor and associate professor can also be conferred with appointment to a senior management position without the need for an extensive academic record or a research higher degree.

Adjunct Professor and Conjoint Professor are not Honorary or Visiting academic titles (separate titles and subtitles). Adjunct Professor and Conjoint Professor titles are based upon a rigorous assessment of the applicant by academic metrics, international standing and eminence. The academic rank of Adjunct Professor and Conjoint Professor are of the highest academic rank, Level E in Australian universities, and in line with the metrics required by a full-time Professor.

Other than in exceptional circumstances, the award of all academic titles (except for Emeritus Professor) will not normally be for a period of less than 3 months and must be for not more than 3 years (5 years in the case of conjoint titles in the Faculty of Medicine).

Recommendations for the level of an academic title must be consistent with the levels expected for paid academic appointments at UNSW.

The title holder will enjoy the precedence and courtesy due to academic staff of the University at the designated academic level. The Head of School (or equivalent) and Dean (or Deputy Vice-Chancellor for conferral of titles within a Division) will determine any other privileges applying to the title holder....The approving authority for each case rests with either the Dean, the Deputy Vice-Chancellor (Academic Quality) (or relevant Deputy Vice-Chancellor) or the Vice-Chancellor & President.

Therefore, assessment is undertaken by several peer reviewed professorial employees of the university. The application for the title to be conferred, is based on a stringent evaluation process and the applicant must demonstrate evidence for instance in research, publications, supervising PhD students... similar to a full-time renumerated Level E Professor at university. The title Adjunct Professor and Conjoint Professor when comparing to a full-time renumerated Professor, implies that they hold a non-salaried or non-renumerated position and therefore the title Adjunct Professor and Conjoint Professor is bestowed upon a person to formally recognise that person's non-employment 'special relationship' with the university.

Emeritus professor is a title bestowed upon a retired person who has rendered distinguished service to the university. They have nearly always held the title of professor at the university. Half the universities in one study specified that the person needed to have served at least 10 years at the university. Some universities have other titles such as Emeritus Educator and Emeritus Scholar. Once the Emeritus Professor title is bestowed, the title is normally for life, though it can be repealed for failing to abide by university regulations.

Additional qualifiers such as Distinguished Professor or Laureate Professor may be conferred by universities upon Level E academics of high standing.

== Overview in New Zealand ==
The system of academic titles in New Zealand is classified as follows:

Teaching and research positions

- Lecturer/Research Fellow
- Senior Lecturer/Senior Research Fellow
- Senior Lecturer (over the bar)/Senior Research Fellow (over the bar)
- Associate Professor
- Professor
- Distinguished Professor

There are also education focused academic roles in New Zealand, these are called:

- Professional Teaching Fellow/Senior Teaching Fellow
- Senior Tutors

== Teaching and research positions ==
Academic positions in Australia and New Zealand can be either continuing (permanent) or fixed-term (contract) appointments. Continuing appointments at the lecturer level and above are similar to the permanent academic posts found in the United Kingdom, and generally involve a 3–5 year probationary period. Between 2009 and 2015, the University of Western Australia (UWA) used titles more aligned with North American academic titles, but reverted to standard Australian academic titles in 2015.

Level	Title	Salary range (AU)	Notes
E	Professor	$189,000 and above	Equivalent to distinguished/endowed professor in most Asian and North American universities and to a professor of a discipline in British universities. In Australia and NZ, the number of academics at Level E is approximately 10 percent of the total number of academic staff. This rank is only given to those who have demonstrated outstanding competence and academic leadership in research, teaching, and service as well as achieving international recognition of their scholarship.
D	Associate Professor	$149,000 - $188,000	Equivalent to full professor in most Asian countries and in North American universities. Equivalent to reader in Britain. Academics appointed to Level D are developing a very strong international profile and have demonstrated sustained high competence in both teaching and research.
C	Senior Lecturer	$112,000 - $140,000	Equivalent to associate professor in North American universities (though without any particular implications in terms of tenure). Normally, academic staff demonstrating sustained competence in research and teaching are promoted to this rank after 4 to 6 years of service at the rank of lecturer. Most appointments at this level are 'continuing', the equivalent of North American tenure, although some temporary appointees at Level B on longer contracts may achieve promotion to Level C during their employment.
B	Lecturer	$92,000 - $118,000	Equivalent to assistant professor in North American universities (though without implication of tenure status – appointments at this level can be strictly temporary, or entirely permanent). This is the usual entry level appointment for new full-time academics, be they permanent or on temporary contract. Appointment at Level B typically requires the candidate to possess a PhD. It is possible for a lecturer in Australia and New Zealand to be on a permanent contract and complete their probation while remaining at Level B, thus attaining the equivalent of tenure.
A	Associate Lecturer	$64,000 - $92,000	Appointments at this level are usually for new academics. Some positions at Level A are occupied by those with extensive industry experience relevant to teaching and research but who do not possess a PhD. Postdoctoral fellowships are also typically awarded at this level.

- Salaries determined by the minimum and maximum salaries within each letter category offered to staff at the University of Queensland, University of Melbourne and University of Western Australia.

== Research only positions ==
- Professor – senior principal research fellow (level E)
- Associate professor – principal research fellow (level D)
- Senior research fellow (level C)
- Research fellow (level B)
- Research associate (level A)

The Australian public service or government organisations also employ a large number of academics or researchers. Different organisations have their own established title systems (e.g., principal scientist, senior officer etc.). However, it is the level rather than the title that determines the equivalent academic rank. With the Commonwealth Scientific & Industry Research Organisation (CSIRO), levels for Research Scientists and Research Engineers are as follows:

- Level 4 (Postdoctoral Fellow), equivalent to academic level A or postdoctoral researcher;
- Level 5 (Research Scientist), equivalent to academic level B;
- Level 6 (Senior Research Scientist), equivalent to academic level C;
- Level 7 (Principal Research Scientist), equivalent to academic level D;
- Level 8 (Senior Principal Research Scientist), equivalent to academic level E;
- Level 9 (Chief Research Scientist).

Most state governments use similar levels, but may use different titles. CSIRO uses the same levels but different titles for other functional roles, including Research Management, Research Projects, and Research Consulting. These roles are less directly analogous to academic positions, though Research Management roles at levels 7 and 8 could be equated to Associate Dean and Dean roles at universities.

The Western Australian state government introduced a specified calling system in 2008. Within this system,

- SC-level 1, equivalent to postdoctoral fellow or associate lecturer;
- SC-level 2, equivalent to lecturer or research scientist;
- SC-level 3, equivalent to senior lecturer or senior scientist;
- SC-level 4, equivalent to associate professor;
- SC-level 5, equivalent to professor;
- SC-level 6, chief.

== Administrative ranks ==
- Visitor (titular)
- Chancellor (titular)
- Deputy chancellor / pro-chancellor (titular)
- Vice-chancellor
- Provost
- Deputy vice-chancellor
- Pro-vice-chancellor (could be the faculty dean)
- Registrar (education) (there is not necessarily such a position)
- Faculty dean (normally professor)
- Faculty deputy dean; associate dean (normally professor, associate professor, or reader)
- Head of school and Head of Department (normally professor, associate professor, or reader)
- Program director (normally senior lecturer or above)
- Course coordinator (lecturer and above)

== See also ==
- List of academic ranks
