= Tom Galligan (college president) =

American academic administrator

Thomas C. Galligan Jr.
- Galligan in 2006

27th (initially interim) President of Louisiana State University
- In office January 1, 2020 – July 5, 2021
- Preceded by: F. King Alexander
- Succeeded by: William F. Tate IV

Dean of Louisiana State University's Paul M. Hebert Law Center
- In office July 1, 2016 – December
- Preceded by: William R. Corbett (interim)

8th President of Colby-Sawyer College
- In office August 1, 2006 – June 30, 2016
- Preceded by: Anne Ponder
- Succeeded by: Susan Stuebner

Dean of the University of Tennessee College of Law
- In office June 1998 – July 2006

Personal details
- Born: September 3, 1955 (age 71) Glen Ridge, New Jersey, U.S.
- Spouse: Susan S. Galligan
- Children: 4
- Education: Stanford University (AB); Seattle University (JD); Columbia University (LLM)
- Profession: College administrator, Lawyer, Academic

Thomas C. Galligan Jr. (born September 3, 1955) is an American lawyer, legal scholar, administrator and educator who was the Interim President of Louisiana State University. He served as the eighth president of Colby-Sawyer College and as dean and professor of law at the University of Tennessee College of Law in Knoxville, where he taught torts and admiralty.

Galligan grew up in Montclair, New Jersey with the dream of becoming a lawyer. He graduated from Montclair Kimberley Academy in 1973.

Prior to taking up administrative roles, Galligan taught at the Paul M. Hebert Law Center from 1986 until May 1998. There, he was named the Dr. Dale E. Bennett Professor of Law and was honored by the students as the Outstanding LSU Professor six times. He returned to LSU as the commencement speaker in 2006, while he was then president-elect at Colby-Sawyer College.

Galligan has published numerous books and articles on torts and admiralty. His scholarship has been cited in the proposed Restatement (Third) of Torts and by numerous legal scholars. Galligan's work has also been cited by the United States Supreme Court and other federal and state appellate and trial courts.

His co-authored scholarship with Professor Frank L. Maraist has been honored by the Louisiana Bar Journal and the Tulane Law Review. Recently, Galligan was honored with the University of Tennessee National Alumni Association Public Service Award for 2006 and the Knoxville Bar Association's Law and Liberty Award.

His expertise in admiralty and international maritime law was widely sought after the Deepwater Horizon oil spill, including by the Associated Press, The Wall Street Journal, and The New York Times. Galligan also testified before the United States Senate's Committee on the Judiciary and the U.S. House of Representatives' Committee on the Judiciary, respectively.

Galligan has a passion for long-distance running and baseball statistics. He has four children, one a graduate of Bates College and two graduates of Dartmouth College, and his daughter Jennifer who graduated Pitzer College.

Galligan has run over twenty marathons, one of which he completed with his daughter, Sarah. His daughter, Jennifer, currently sits as the Senior Development and Marketing Manager of Junior Achievement of Middle Tennessee.
