= Polled Hereford Breed Origin Site =

- Formerly listed on the U.S. National Register of Historic Places
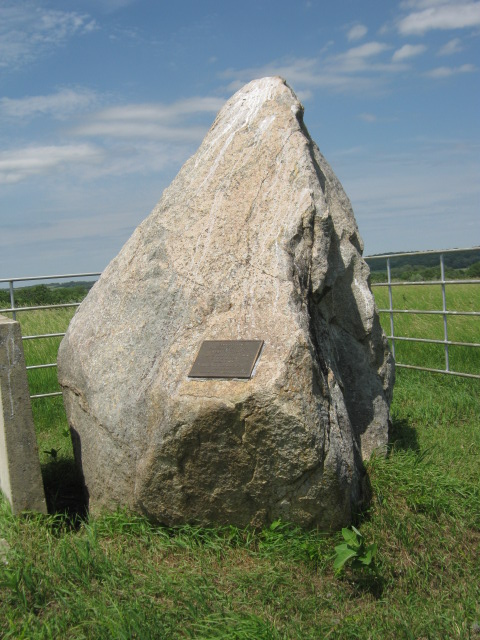
- Historical marker

- Location within Iowa Location within the United States
- Location: Southwest of Indianola
- Coordinates: 41°15′32″N 93°40′54″W
- Area: 5 acres (2.0 ha)
- NRHP reference No.: 83000408

Significant dates
- Added to NRHP: June 24, 1983
- Removed from NRHP: November 21, 2025

The Polled Hereford Breed Origin Site is a historic site located southwest of Indianola, Iowa, United States. The American owners of Hereford cattle in the 19th century knew that the breed occasionally produced calves that did not develop horns. They are known as polled, which means "naturally hornless." As early as 1893 attempts were made in Kansas and Ontario in Canada to produce the hornless variant. Warren Gammon, a Des Moines lawyer, developed his plan after seeing polled Herefords at the Trans-Mississippi Exposition in 1893. With his son Bert, he leased 5 acres (2.0 ha) of a farm that was owned by the Angus Coal Mining Company. He acquired four bulls and ten cows of purebred Herefords that had failed to develop horns. Two cows were infertile and one bull had to be eliminated. Beside the windmill where the bull "Giant" was tied up the first planned mating with a Polled Hereford cow took place on February 21, 1902. By 1976, the Polled Hereford breed was numerically greater than the horned variety in the United States, and was about three-fourths of Iowa's Hereford stock. The Iowa Polled Hereford Association erected a historical marker at the site. The site was listed on the National Register of Historic Places in 1983, and was delisted in 2025.

== See also ==
- Category:Cattle breeds originating in the United States
- National Register of Historic Places listings in Warren County, Iowa
