= James Colgate Cleveland =

American politician (1920–1995)

James Cleveland
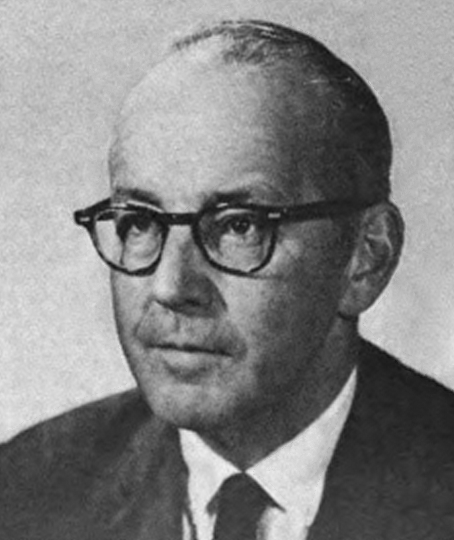

Member of the U.S. House of Representatives from New Hampshire's 2nd district
- In office January 3, 1963 – January 3, 1981
- Preceded by: Perkins Bass
- Succeeded by: Judd Gregg

Personal details
- Born: James Colgate Cleveland; June 13, 1920 Montclair, New Jersey, U.S.
- Died: December 3, 1995 (aged 75) New London, New Hampshire, U.S.
- Party: Republican
- Spouse: Hilary Paterson
- Children: 5
- Relatives: Patience Cleveland (sister)
- Education: Colgate University (BA); Yale University (LLB)
- Awards: Bronze Star Medal

Military service
- Branch/service: United States Army
- Years of service: 1941–1946; 1951–1952
- Rank: Captain
- Battles/wars: World War II; Korean War

James Colgate Cleveland (June 13, 1920 – December 3, 1995) was an American politician in the U.S. state of New Hampshire. He served as a Republican member of the United States House of Representatives from 1963 to 1981.

== Early life ==
Cleveland was born in Montclair, Essex County, New Jersey. He attended Deerfield Academy in Deerfield, Massachusetts before graduating from Colgate University in Hamilton, New York in 1942. He then attended Yale Law School as a graduate student. His time at Yale was interrupted when he enlisted in the Army in December 1941. During World War II, he served overseas in the Pacific in the 40th Infantry Division and was discharged as a captain of Field Artillery in February 1946. He returned to Yale after the war and earned his law degree in 1948. He was admitted to the bar and began practicing law in New London in January 1949.

== Political career ==
Cleveland held various political positions in New Hampshire, and served as a Republican member of the New Hampshire Senate from 1950 to 1962. In June 1951 he was recalled up to the Army during the Korean War and was stationed in Germany. He was awarded the Bronze Star for valor, and retired from service in November 1952. He was an organizer and director of New London Trust Company, and served as a member of the New Hampshire State Senate from 1950 to 1962. He served as majority floor leader twice while he was in the State Senate.

In 1962 Cleveland ran as a Republican candidate for the office of United States Representative for 2nd district. He was elected to the 88th Congress and to the eight succeeding Congresses, serving from January 3, 1963, to January 3, 1981. While he stated that he only ran because he didn't think there were good choices for the position, he won the respect of the constituents of his district. By using a bi-annual questionnaire sent to the people in his district, he tried to represent their desires even if it were not his own personal opinion of an issue. In Congress he served on the United States House Committee on Transportation and Infrastructure. He was not a candidate for reelection in 1980 to the Ninety-seventh Congress and retired from public life.

Cleveland supported the Civil Rights Acts of 1964 and 1968, as well as the Medicare program, the Voting Rights Act of 1965, and the Housing and Urban Development Act of 1968.

== Death and legacy ==
Cleveland died on December 3, 1995 (age 75 years, 173 days) in New London, New Hampshire. He is interred at Old Main Street Cemetery in New London.

In appreciation of Cleveland's work in Congress, the United States Post Office and Court House building in Concord was renamed the James C. Cleveland Federal Building in 1980. In 1982 the James C. Cleveland Bridge was constructed in Berlin, New Hampshire in his honor.

The James C. Cleveland Papers are held by the Cleveland, Colby, Colgate Archives of Colby-Sawyer College in New London.

== Family life ==
Cleveland was the eldest son of Dr. Mather Cleveland and Susan Everett (Colgate) Cleveland. His sister was actress Patience Cleveland. On December 9, 1950, Cleveland married Hilary Paterson, and they moved into the Cleveland summer home in New London. They had five children, Cotton Mather, James Colby, David Paterson, Lincoln Mather, and Susan Sclater. Cleveland's wife became a professor at Colby–Sawyer College.

U.S. House of Representatives
Preceded by Perkins Bass	Member of the U.S. House of Representatives from New Hampshire's 2nd congressional district 1963–1981	Succeeded by Judd Gregg
