= Colby–Sawyer College =

Private college in New London, New Hampshire, US

Coordinates: 43°24′44″N 71°58′40″W

Colby-Sawyer College
- Colgate Hall
- Former name: List: New London Academy (1837–1854); New London Literary and Scientific Institute (1854–1878); Colby Academy (1878–1928); Colby School for Girls (1928–1933); Colby Junior College for Women (1933–1973); Colby College-New Hampshire (1973–1975)
- Motto: Paratae Servire ("Prepared to Serve")
- Type: Private college
- Established: July 4, 1837; 189 years ago
- Endowment: $75.7 million (2025)
- President: Dean McCurdy
- Students: 943
- Undergraduates: 867
- Postgraduates: 76
- Location: New London, New Hampshire, United States
- Campus: Rural; 32 buildings on 200 acres (0.81 km^{2})
- Colors: (Blue and black)
- Sporting affiliations: NCAA Division III - GNAC; EISA
- Mascot: Chargers (Horse)
- Website: colby-sawyer.edu
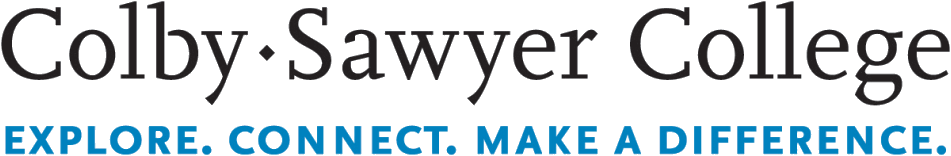

Colby–Sawyer College is a private college in New London, New Hampshire, United States. It was founded as a coeducational academy in 1837 and sits on a 200-acre (0.81 km^{2}) campus.

== History ==
=== New London Academy ===
A legislative charter was granted by the State of New Hampshire in 1837 to eleven New London citizens for the purpose of establishing a school, the New London Academy, in the town. The eleven men who were named as the academy's incorporators were Joseph Colby, Anthony Colby, Perley Burpee, Jonathan Greeley, John Brown, Jonathan Herrick, David Everett, Samuel Carr, Walter Flanders, Jonathan Addison and Marshall Trayne.

It was a coeducational secondary school, for which Susan Colby served as the first teacher and principal. It opened with a student body of 26 girls and one boy, but soon enrolled 54 male students.

In 1858, the New Hampton Literary and Theological Institution moved to Fairfax, Vermont, and the New Hampshire Baptists, with encouragement from former Governor Anthony Colby and New London's Baptist minister, Ebenezer Dodge, assumed responsibility for the Academy. The name of the school was then changed to the New London Literary and Scientific Institute. The new Board of Trustees was made up of 24 members, three-fourths of whom had to be from New Hampshire but not from New London, and three-fourths of whom also had to be Baptists in good standing.

=== New London Literary and Scientific Institution ===
In 1854, the Ladies Boarding House (later called Heidelberg) was built on what is now the New London green to accommodate up to 40 female students and the female faculty. Anthony Colby also purchased the original New London town meeting house and moved it to campus, where it was renovated to provide 20 double rooms for the male students. The building is called Colby Hall. In 1870, a brick Academy building was dedicated, located on the present site of Colgate Hall. The building provided dormitory space for 100 female students as well as classrooms, laboratories, library, gymnastic facilities, chapel, dining room, kitchen and laundry facilities. It burned in 1892.

=== Colby Academy ===
The school was renamed again in 1878, becoming the Colby Academy, a tribute to the ongoing support of the Colby family of New London.

Financed by Mary ("Mellie") Colgate, Colgate Hall was completed and dedicated in 1912, named in honor of the Colgate family whose members were dedicated supporters of the college. Colgate Hall housed female students, administrative offices, a library, dining room, kitchen, chapel, classrooms, and laundry. The male students continued to reside in Colby Hall.

In 1922, H. Leslie Sawyer became headmaster of Colby Academy. He would lead the institution until 1955, leading its transition into a junior college.

=== Colby School for Girls to Colby Junior College for Women ===
After 90 years as a secondary school, Colby Academy trustees voted in 1927 to transform Colby Academy into a junior college and preparatory school for women. After this decision, the school changed names again in 1928, becoming the Colby School for Girls. In 1930, fourteen women received the first associate degrees conferred by the newly-renamed school.

McKean Hall was built in 1930 and named for Horace G. McKean, Colby Academy's headmaster from 1899 to 1905. In 1931, Colby Hall was built, a residence hall named in honor of the Colby family. In 1931 Shepard Hall was built in honor of one of the original New London families who were trustees of the Academy and the College. In 1934 Burpee Hall was built, dedicated to the Burpee alumni, and trustees. The hall housed the library collection until 1949.

In 1933, by an act of the New Hampshire Legislature, Colby School for Girls was changed to Colby Junior College for Women. The preparatory courses were phased out.

On Oct. 18, 1941, Eleanor Roosevelt visited the college and gave a speech to the community at the Baptist church.

In 1943, the college charter was amended by the New Hampshire General Court to allow the granting of baccalaureate programs.

=== Colby–Sawyer College ===
The institution's board of trustees changed the name of the institution to Colby College-New Hampshire in 1973. In 1974, the unrelated Colby College in Waterville, Maine filed a lawsuit arguing that the name change would cause confusion between the two. After an appeals court ruled in the Maine school's favor, the New Hampshire school announced in 1975 that it would become Colby Women's College, despite recently admitting several male students. The Maine Colby College filed a second lawsuit, saying that name would also cause confusion. U.S. District Court Judge Hugh Bownes again ruled in the Maine Colby's favor, saying it would effectively have "a veto over any name chosen in which Colby is the first word, except for the prior name of Colby Junior College for Women." The New Hampshire school then settled on Colby–Sawyer College, honoring the institution's longtime president H. Leslie Sawyer, who had died in 1972.

The Windy Hill School, a child study lab school, was established in 1976 as a site for teacher internships and student practica. The Windy Hill School is now housed in the college's first building designed to be LEED silver certified (opened 2010) and remains one of the few lab schools in northern New England.

In 1989, the board of trustees announced that Colby–Sawyer College would begin admitting male students beginning in the fall of 1990, returning the college to its coeducational roots.

In 1990, the Ware Campus Center, formerly the Library-Commons building, was dedicated to Judge Martha Ware. In 1991 the Hogan Sports Center, dedicated to Daniel and Kathleen Hogan, and the Kelsey Tennis Courts opened; in 1994, Mercer Field was dedicated in honor of William and Ramona Mercer. In 1995, the Baker Communications Center was dedicated, named for Elbert H. Baker, distinguished in the communications industry and father of Martine Baker Anderson, a member of the Class of 1959.

In 2004, the Curtis L. Ivey Science Center opened, and the student lodge was renamed the Lethbridge Lodge in honor of trustee and friend, George “Bud” Lethbridge. In fall 2010, Windy Hill School moved into its new building, and in summer 2011, Colby-Sawyer introduced online summer courses.

=== Presidents ===
H. Leslie Sawyer served as president until his retirement in 1955, followed by presidents Eugene M. Austin (1955–1962) and Everett M. Woodman (1962–1972). The college began its transition to a senior institution during the administration of Louis C. Vaccaro (1972–1978) and completed this change under the presidency of H. Nicholas Muller III (1978–1986). Peggy A. Stock (1986–1995), sixth president of the college, increased enrollment, completed a successful capital campaign, and constructed or renovated several buildings, including Rooke Hall. Anne Ponder became the seventh president of the college in March 1996; she extended the college's contiguous land holdings to 190 acres (0.77 km^{2}), to build and dedicate Lawson Hall, and to enhance academic facilities and programs. Tom Galligan joined Colby–Sawyer College as its eighth president in August 2006. In July 2016, Galligan was succeeded by Susan Stuebner as the ninth president. She was succeeded by Dean McCurdy, who began his tenure at the college's 10th president June 1, 2025.

== Academics ==
=== Academic departments ===
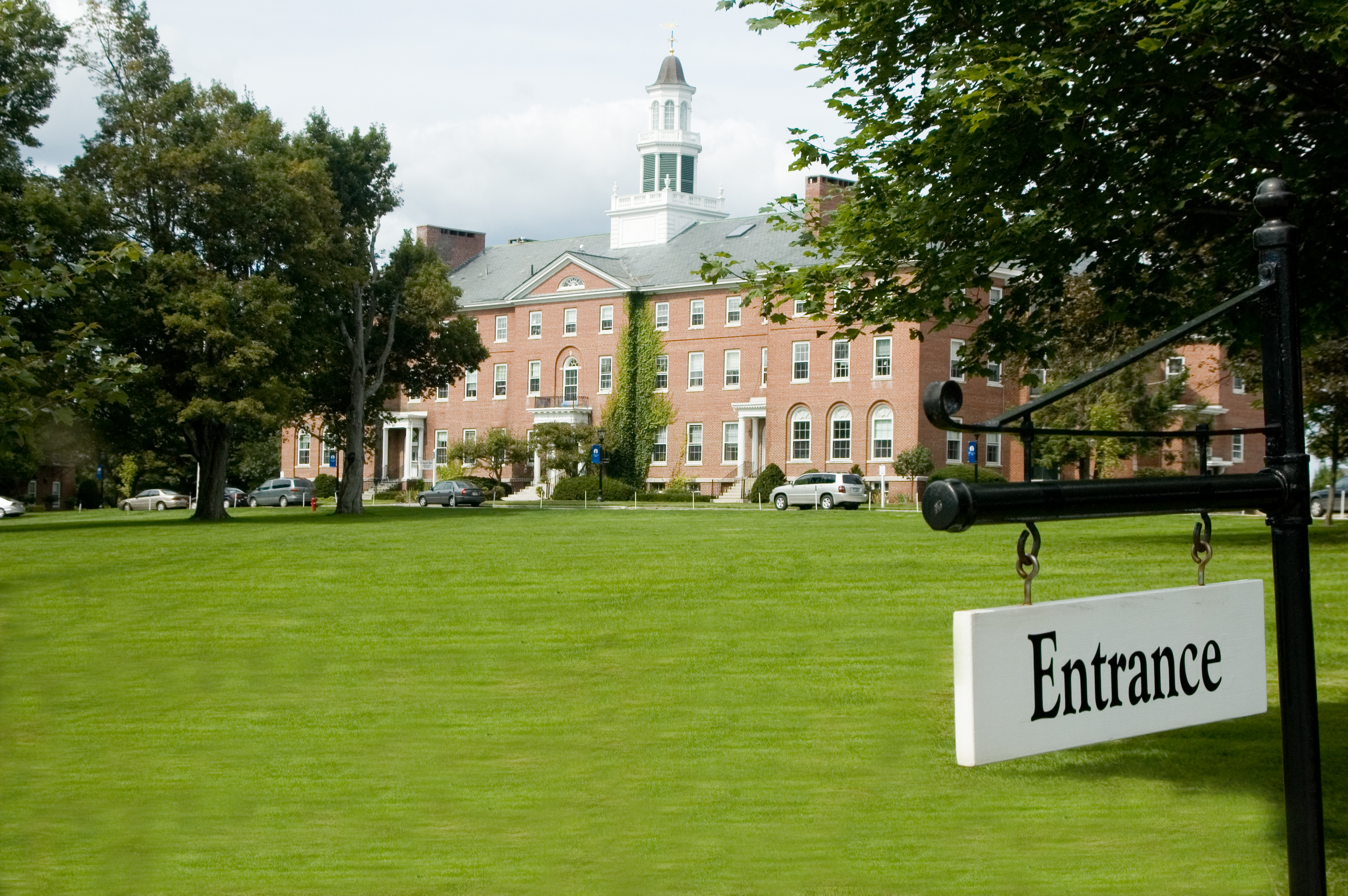
Colgate Hall

- Business Administration
- Exercise and Sport Sciences
- Fine and Performing Arts
- Natural and Environmental Studies
- Humanities
- School of Nursing and Health Professions
- Social Sciences and Education

=== Special programs and services ===
- Air Force or Army Reserve Officer Training Corps (ROTC)
- Associate Degree in Liberal Arts
- Capstone
- Certificate Programs
- Coaching Certification
- Double majors and minors are available
- Early Childhood Education (N-3) curriculum
- First Year Seminar
- Green Routes
- Independent Studies
- International Student Programs/English as a Second Language
- Internships are required for all students
- Learning and Tutorial Services
- The New Hampshire College & University Council Student Exchange
- Nursing Update Course
- Online B.S.
- Pre-Law curriculum
- Pre-Medical curriculum
- Pre-Physical Therapy curriculum
- Pre-Veterinary curriculum
- Research Assistantships
- R.N. to B.S. in Nursing
- Study Abroad
- Teaching Assistantships
- Washington Internship Institute
- Wesson Honors Program

=== Honor societies ===
- Alpha Chi
- Colby–Sawyer College Honor Society for Nursing
- Lambda Pi Eta
- Psi Chi
- Sigma Beta Delta
- Sigma Theta Tau

=== Accreditation ===
New England Association of Schools and College (NEASC); Commission on Accreditation of Allied Health Education Programs (CAAHEP); commission Collegiate Nursing Education (CCNE); New Hampshire Board of Nursing; New Hampshire Board of Education.

== Campus ==
=== Science Center and Library ===
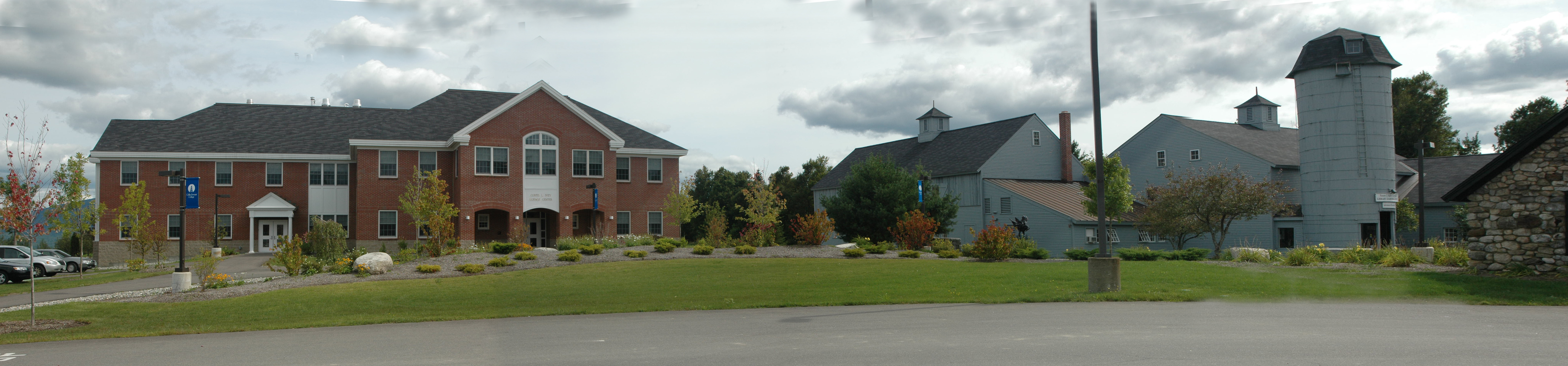

The Curtis L. Ivey Science Center opened in September 2004. The 33,000-square-foot (3,100 m^{2}) building houses the Community and Environmental Studies and Biology Programs, as well as faculty in the Natural Sciences Department. The Center includes Clements Hall, the 182 seat auditorium, and the geographic information systems (GIS) laboratory.

=== Campus initiatives ===
- Adventures in Learning
- Green Routes
- The New Hampshire Women's Caucus
- Teaching Enrichment Center
- Quantitative Literacy Across the Curriculum

=== Cleveland Colby Colgate Archives ===
In addition to institutional records, the Archives maintains the college's Special Collections which consists of rare books as well as manuscript collections of notable men and women from New Hampshire, including the late New Hampshire Congressman James C. Cleveland's papers and the Pillsbury Family papers.

== Athletics ==
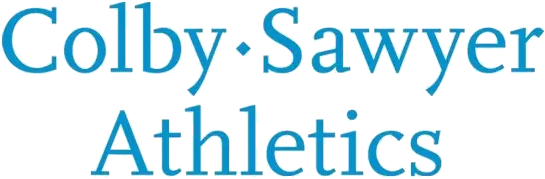
Colby-Sawyer athletics wordmark

The Colby-Sawyer athletics program consists of intercollegiate, club, intramural and recreational sports. Colby–Sawyer College competes as an NCAA Division III institution, and is a member of the Great Northeast Athletic Conference (GNAC), the Eastern College Athletic Conference (ECAC), the Intercollegiate Horse Show Association (IHSA), the Eastern Intercollegiate Ski Association (EISA) and the New England Intercollegiate Swimming and Diving Association (NEISDA). From 1995 to 2011, Colby-Sawyer competed as a member of the Commonwealth Coast Conference (CCC). In 2018-19, Colby-Sawyer left the NAC to become members of the Great Northeast Athletic Conference (GNAC).

Colby-Sawyer offers the following varsity men's sports: alpine skiing, baseball, basketball, cross-country, indoor track and field, outdoor track and field, lacrosse, soccer and tennis. Colby-Sawyer offers the following varsity women's sports: alpine skiing, basketball, cross-country, field hockey, lacrosse, soccer, softball, tennis, indoor track and field, outdoor track and field and volleyball. Colby-Sawyer offers one co-ed sport: equestrian. In 1989, the equestrian team won the IHSA national hunt-seat championship.

Active club sports at CSC are cycling, golf, ice hockey, outing club, men's and women's rugby, cross country running, snowboarding, softball, men's lacrosse, and fencing. Intramurals include Flag Football, Co-Rec Volleyball, 3 on 3 Basketball, and Fall Golf, 5 on 5 Basketball, Floor Hockey, Co-Rec Dodgeball, Co-Rec Indoor Soccer, and Spring Golf.

== Notable alumni and faculty ==
- John H. Bartlett (1869–1952), teacher, high school principal, lawyer, author and governor of New Hampshire
- John Q. A. Brackett (1842–1918), 36th governor of Massachusetts
- Cabell Breckinridge (1788–1823), lawyer, legislator, Speaker of the House and Secretary of State of the Commonwealth of Kentucky
- Hilary Cleveland, professor of history and political science at Colby-Sawyer for more than 50 years; Republican activist who endorsed Howard Dean in 2004
- Shepard B. Clough (1901–1990), professor of European history at Columbia University
- Anthony Colby (1792–1873), businessman and governor of New Hampshire
- Nate Corddry (b. 1977), television and film actor
- Tomie dePaola (1934–2020), children's book author and illustrator, worked at Colby-Sawyer as an associate professor, designer, and technical director in the speech and theater department and as writer and set and costume designer for the Children's Theatre Project
- David Elliott (b. 1947), children's author, taught creative writing, adolescent literature and playwriting at Colby-Sawyer from 1998-2013; also served as director of International Student Services
- Tom Galligan (b. 1955), professor of law; eighth president of Colby-Sawyer
- William H. Gilmore (1839–1910), Vermont farmer, businessman, soldier, legislator, and Adjutant General of the state militia
- Julien J. LeBourgeois (1923–2012), former vice admiral of the United States Navy and President of the Naval War College who became a student at Colby-Sawyer after he retired
- Charles Henry Morrill (1843–1928), Nebraska businessman and land speculator after whom Morrill County, Nebraska, is named
- Daniel L. Plumer (1837–1920), Wisconsin businessman and politician
- Martha Ware (1917–2009), Massachusetts lawyer, legislator and judge; graduated from Colby-Sawyer with an associate degree in secretarial science
- Benjamin Ide Wheeler (1854–1927), Greek and comparative philology professor; later president of the University of California
