= Academic tenure in North America =

Contractual right for teachers

Academic tenure in the United States and Canada is a contractual right that grants a teacher or professor a permanent position of employment at an academic institution such as a university or school. Tenure is intended to protect educators from dismissal without just cause, and to allow development of thoughts or ideas considered unpopular or controversial among the community. In North America, tenure is granted only to educators whose work is considered to be exceptionally productive and beneficial in their careers.

Academic tenure became a standard for education institutions in North America with the introduction of the American Association of University Professors (AAUP)'s 1940 Statement of Principles on Academic Freedom and Tenure. In this statement, the AAUP provides a definition of academic tenure: "a means to certain ends, specifically: (1) freedom of teaching and research and of extramural activities, and (2) a sufficient degree of economic security to make the profession attractive to men and women of ability."

== Academic tenure at colleges and universities ==
Under the tenure systems adopted by many universities and colleges in the United States and Canada, some faculty positions have tenure and some do not. Typical systems, such as the widely adopted "1940 Statement of Principles on Academic Freedom and Tenure" of the American Association of University Professors, allow only a limited period to establish a record of published research, ability to attract grant funding, academic visibility, teaching excellence, and administrative or community service. They limit the number of years that any employee can remain employed as a non-tenured instructor or professor, compelling the institution to grant tenure to or terminate an individual, with significant advance notice, at the end of a specified time period. Some institutions require promotion to Associate Professor as a condition of tenure. An institution may also offer other academic positions that are not time-limited, with titles such as lecturer, adjunct professor, or research professor, but these positions do not carry the possibility of tenure and are said to be not "tenure track".

Academic tenure's original purpose was to guarantee the right to academic freedom: it protects teachers and researchers when they dissent from prevailing opinion, openly disagree with authorities of any sort, or spend time on unfashionable topics. Thus academic tenure is similar to the lifetime tenure that protects some judges from external pressure. Without job security, the scholarly community as a whole may experience pressure to favor noncontroversial lines of academic inquiry. The intent of tenure is to allow original ideas to be more likely to arise, by giving scholars the intellectual autonomy to investigate the problems and solutions as they see fit and to report their honest conclusions. However, it has also become a type of job security for professors.

In North American universities and colleges, the tenure track has long been a defining feature of professorial employment, although it is less than universal. In North American universities, positions that carry tenure, or the opportunity to attain tenure, have grown more slowly than non-tenure-track positions, leading to a large "academic underclass". For example, most US universities supplement the work of tenured professors with the services of non-tenured adjunct professors, academics who teach classes for lower wages and fewer employment benefits under relatively short-term contracts. For those that are tenure track, it generally takes seven years to earn tenure while working as an assistant professor. Tenure is determined by a combination of research, teaching, and service, with each factor weighted according to the values of a particular university, college or department. There is some evidence that professors that share more (e.g. via open access publications, open data, or open source hardware development) gain an advantage in obtaining tenure because they are cited more and can thus develop a higher h-index. This competition for limited resources could lead to ethically questionable behaviour.

== History in the United States ==
=== 19th century ===
In the 19th century, university professors largely served at the pleasure of the board of trustees of the university. Sometimes, major donors could successfully remove professors or prohibit the hiring of certain individuals; nonetheless, a de facto tenure system existed. Usually professors were only fired for interfering with the religious principles of a college, and most boards were reluctant to discipline professors. The courts rarely intervened in dismissals.

In one debate of the Cornell University Board of Trustees in the 1870s, a businessman trustee argued against the prevailing system of de facto tenure, but lost the argument. Despite the power retained in the board, academic freedom prevailed. Another example is the 1894 case of Richard T. Ely, a University of Wisconsin–Madison professor who advocated for labor strikes and labor law reform. Though the Wisconsin legislature and business interests pressed for his dismissal, the board of trustees of the university passed a resolution committing itself to academic freedom, and to retaining him (without tenure):

In all lines of academic investigation it is of the utmost importance that the investigator should be absolutely free to follow the indications of truth wherever they may lead. Whatever may be the limitations which trammel inquiry elsewhere we believe the great state University of Wisconsin should ever encourage that continual and fearless sifting and winnowing by which alone the truth can be found.

=== From 1900 to 1940 ===
In 1901, the president of the University of Chicago, Wiillam Rainey Harper asserted that no donor had the right to interfere with the teaching or appointment of faculty. Likewise, Charles Eliot at Harvard University, and Nicholas Murray Butler at Columbia University expressed similar sentiments.

In 1915, this was followed by the American Association of University Professors' declaration of principles—the traditional justification for academic freedom and tenure.

The AAUP's declaration of principles recommended that:

- Trustees raise faculty salaries, but not bind their consciences with restrictions.
- Only committees of other faculty members can judge a member of the faculty. This would also insulate higher administration from external accountability decisions.
- Faculty appointments be made by other faculty and chairpersons, with three elements:
  1. Clear employment contracts
  2. formal academic tenure, and
  3. clearly stated grounds for dismissal.

While the AAUP pushed reform, tenure battles were a campus non-issue. In 1910, a survey of 22 universities showed that most professors held their positions with "presumptive permanence". At a third of colleges, assistant professor appointments were considered permanent, while at most colleges multi-year appointments were subject to renewal. Only at one university did a governing board ratify a president's decisions on granting tenure.

An important tenure case in this period was the 1936 denial of tenure for Jerome Davis, a professor of practical philanthropy at Yale Divinity School.

=== From 1940 to 1972 ===
In 1940, the AAUP recommended that the academic tenure probationary period be seven years, which is still the norm. It also suggested that a tenured professor could not be dismissed without adequate cause, except "under extraordinary circumstances, because of financial emergencies." Also, the statement recommended that the professor be given the written reasons for dismissal and an opportunity to be heard in self-defense. Another purpose of the academic tenure probationary period was raising the performance standards of the faculty by pressing new professors to perform to the standard of the school's established faculty.

The most significant adoption of academic tenure occurred after 1945, when the influx of returning GIs returning to school led to quickly expanding universities with severe professorial faculty shortages. These shortages dogged the academy for ten years, and that is when the majority of universities started offering formal tenure as a side benefit. In fact, the demand for professors was so high in the 1950s that the American Council of Learned Societies held a conference in Cuba noting the too-few doctoral candidates to fill positions in English departments. During the McCarthy era, loyalty oaths were required of many state employees, and neither formal academic tenure nor the Constitutional principles of freedom of speech and association were protection from dismissal. Some professors were dismissed for their political affiliations. During the 1960s, many professors supported the anti-war movement against the Vietnam War, and more than 20 state legislatures passed resolutions calling for specific professorial dismissals and a change to the academic tenure system.

By 1969, the percentage of faculty that were tenured was 51 percent.

=== Since 1972 ===
Two landmark U.S. Supreme Court cases changed tenure in 1972: (i) Board of Regents of State Colleges v. Roth, 408 US 564; and (ii) Perry v. Sindermann, 408 US 593. These two cases held that a professor's claim to entitlement must be more than a subjective expectancy of continued employment. Rather, there must be a contractual relationship or a reference in a contract to a specific tenure policy or agreement. Further, the court held that a tenured professor who is discharged from a public college has been deprived of a property interest, and so due process applies, requiring certain procedural safeguards (the right to personally appear in a hearing, the right to examine evidence and respond to accusations, the right to have advisory counsel).

Later cases specified other bases for dismissal: (i) if a professor's conduct were incompatible with his duties (Trotman v. Bd. of Trustees of Lincoln Univ., 635 F.2d 216 (2d Cir.1980)); (ii) if the discharge decision is based on an objective rule (Johnson v. Bd. of Regents of U. Wisc. Sys., 377 F. Supp 277, (W.D. Wisc. 1974)). After these cases were judged, the number of reported cases in the matter of academic tenure increased more than two-fold: from 36 cases filed during the decade 1965–1975, to 81 cases filed during the period 1980–1985.

During the 1980s there were no notable tenure battles, but there were three in the 1990s. In 1995, the Florida Board of Regents tried to re-evaluate academic tenure, but managed only to institute a weak, post-tenure performance review. Likewise, in 1996 the Arizona Board of Regents attempted to re-evaluate tenure, fearing that few full-time professors actually taught university undergraduate students, mainly because the processes of achieving academic tenure underweighted teaching. However, faculty and administrators defended themselves and the board of trustees dropped its review. Finally, the University of Minnesota Regents tried from 1995 to 1996 to enact 13 proposals, including these policy changes: to allow the regents to cut faculty base- salaries for reasons other than a university financial emergency including poor performance; to fire tenured professors when their programs were eliminated or restructured if the university were unable to retrain or reassign them. In the Minnesota system, 87 percent of university faculty were either tenured or on the tenure track, and the professors vehemently defended themselves. Eventually, the president of the system opposed these changes and weakened a compromise plan by the dean of the law school before it then failed. "The board overreached what was the available political consensus,” according to Richard Chait, a Harvard professor and tenure specialist hired as a consultant to the regents. In Chait's The Questions of Tenure, a lack of data is credited for hampering reform of the tenure code in Minnesota. The board chairman resigned later that year.

The period since 1972 has seen a steady decline in the percentage (although not the numbers) of college and university teaching positions in the US that are either tenured or tenure-track. United States Department of Education statistics put the combined tenured/tenure-track rate at 56% for 1975, 46.8% for 1989, and 31.9% for 2005.

In 2005, a full 48% of teachers that year were part-time employees.

==== Racial and gender disparities ====
Although diversity in tenured faculty has improved since the 1990s, the existing cohort is still not representative: in fall 2020, 59.4% of tenured faculty in the United States were men and 73.8% were white, while in fall 1991, 79.5% of tenured faculty were men and 90.4% were white. In fall 2019, 4.8% of tenured faculty were Black and only 2.3% were Black women.

Accounting for these disparities, numerous studies have shown that racially and ethnically underrepresented professors "still experience social isolation, subtle and occasionally overt prejudice, a lack of mentors and ambiguous expectations." Notably, a study published in 2024, using a sample of over 1,500 promotion and tenure decisions made across 5 US institutions between 2015 and 2022, found evidence of racial disparities in the promotion and tenure process. Specifically, the authors found that historically underrepresented minority (Black and Hispanic) faculty, compared to White and Asian faculty, received on average 7% more negative votes and were 44% less likely to receive a unanimous vote at the college-level of voting.

== Revocation ==
In 1985, the United States Supreme Court decision Cleveland Board of Education v. Loudermill determined that a tenured public school teacher cannot be dismissed without oral or written notice regarding the charges against him or her. Additionally, the Court held that the employer must provide an explanation of the employer's decision, including a discussion of the employer's evidence, and the teacher must be given an opportunity for a fair and meaningful hearing.

In 1994, a study in The Chronicle of Higher Education found that "about 50 tenured professors [in the US] are dismissed each year for cause." While tenure protects the occupant of an academic position, it does not protect against the elimination of that position. For example, a university that is under financial stress may take the drastic step of eliminating or downsizing some departments, in which case both tenured and untenured faculty are let go.

== Criticisms of tenure ==
=== For school teachers ===
In 2012, tenure for school teachers was challenged in a California lawsuit called Vergara v. California. The primary issue in the case was the impact of tenure on student outcomes and on equity in education. On June 10, 2014, the trial judge ruled that California's teacher tenure statute produced disparities that "shock the conscience" and violate the equal protection clause of the California Constitution; his ruling was later overturned on appeal.

=== For college professors ===
The American Association of University Professors has handled hundreds of cases where it alleges that tenure candidates were treated unfairly. The AAUP has censured many universities and colleges for such alleged tenure abuses.

Tenure at many universities depends primarily on research publications and research grants, although the universities' official policies are that tenure depends on research, teaching and service. The demand that a professor show exemplary production in research is intense. Unless a professor's research is in pedagogy (for instance within a School of Education), articles in refereed teaching journals and obtaining teaching grants often do not contribute greatly towards tenure, as the research is not focused on the professor's creating new knowledge in his or her home discipline. Business schools also consider contribution to practice, but this is difficult to implement due to a lack of generally accepted criteria and metrics.

Tenure decisions can result in fierce political battles. In one tenure battle at Indiana University in 2000, an untenured professor was accused of threatening violence against those who opposed his promotion, his wife briefly went on a hunger strike, and many called for the entire department to be disbanded. In another instance in February 2010, Amy Bishop with the University of Alabama in Huntsville shot and killed colleagues after losing her appeal for tenure.

In the 1970s, philosopher John Searle has called for major changes to tenure systems, calling the practice "without adequate justification." Searle suggests that to reduce publish or perish pressures that can hamper their classroom teaching, capable professors be given tenure much sooner than the standard four-to-six years. However, Searle also argued that tenured professors be reviewed every seven years to help eliminate "incompetent" teachers who can otherwise find refuge in the tenure system.

It has also been suggested that tenure may have the effect of diminishing political and academic freedom among those seeking it – that they must appear to conform to the political or academic views of the field or the institution where they seek tenure. For example, in The Trouble with Physics, the theoretical physicist Lee Smolin says "... it is practically career suicide for young theoretical physicists not to join the field of string theory ...". It is certainly possible to view the tenure track as a long-term demonstration of the candidate's political and academic conformity. Patrick J. Michaels, a part-time research professor at the University of Virginia, wrote: "... tenure has had the exact opposite effect as to its stated goal of diversifying free expression. Instead, it stifles free speech in the formative years of a scientist's academic career, and all but requires a track record in support of paradigms that might have outgrown their usefulness." However, this point of view would tend to argue not against the abolition of the tenure system, but the shortening of the probationary period, since after receiving tenure, professors no longer feel the pressure to conform to their discipline's mainline views.

As more academics publish research in Internet and multimedia formats, organizations such as the American Council of Learned Societies and Modern Language Association have recommended changes to promotion and tenure criteria, and some university departments have made such changes to reflect the increasing importance of networked scholarship.

The root of some of these criticisms is that elsewhere in the world, there are very few tenure systems, and no time-limited employment. The system in the rest of the English speaking world, for example, is based on promotion up union-negotiated payscales, usually with automatic advancement towards the top of a grade, with the luckier faculty members being on 'permanent contracts' with no end-date. To go to the next grade (e.g. from associate professor to professor), an application must be submitted, and the criteria are as exacting as in North America. Simon Batterbury argues this system offers less opportunity for sabotage, and more adherence to social justice goals, even though 'permanent' staff members can be fired at any time.

==== Invisible labor ====
Invisible labor in academia refers to the work carried out by collegiate faculty that largely goes unrecognized in terms of tenure evaluation. Two major examples of invisible labor are student mentoring and university diversity/inclusionary work. Though student mentoring and inclusion are important aspects to student success, these tasks are often undervalued in faculty evaluations when compared to other academic work, such as publishing research and attaining grant money.

This labor is often carried out disproportionately by faculty from marginalized backgrounds. While the majority of professors agree that diversity is very important to education, most of the diversity and inclusionary work is carried out by non-male, non-white, and first-generation faculty. Because of their diverse backgrounds, professors from marginalized backgrounds often experience increased pressure in performing diversity service tasks, while being held to the same standards for promotion. While diversity among students has been increasing, the rate of diversity among professors has progressed at a much slower pace. This disparity places a greater demand on minority professors to mentor students, who often seek out mentors from a similar background. Intersectionality appears to play a role in invisible labor, as professors with multiple marginalized identities experience increased pressure to engage in low-promotability work.

== Defense of tenure for college professors ==
Defenders of tenure, like Ellen Schrecker and Aeon J. Skoble, generally acknowledge flaws in how tenure approvals are run and problems in how tenured professors might use their time, security, and power; however, as Skoble puts it, the "downsides are either not as bad as claimed, or [are] costs outweighed by the benefits"—and he points out that the very debate about tenure in which he is engaging is made possible by the academic freedom which tenure makes possible. "Tenure remains scholars' best defense of free inquiry and heterodoxy," writes Skoble, "especially in these times of heightened polarization and internet outrage. Let us focus on fixing it, not scrapping it."

The job security granted by tenure is necessary to recruit talented individuals into university professorships, because in many fields private industry jobs pay significantly more; as Schrecker puts it, providing professors "the kind of job security that most other workers can only dream of" counterbalances universities' inability to compete with the private sector: "Universities, after all, are not corporations and cannot provide the kinds of financial remuneration that similarly educated individuals in other fields expect.". Furthermore, Schrecker continues, because research positions require extreme specialization, they must consolidate the frequency and intensity of performance evaluations across a given career, and they cannot have the same flexibility or turnover rates as other jobs, making the tenure process a practical necessity: "A mathematician cannot teach a class on medieval Islam, nor can an art historian run an organic chemistry lab. Moreover, there is no way that the employing institution can provide the kind of retraining that would facilitate such a transformation... even the largest and most well-endowed institution lacks the resources to reevaluate and replace its medieval Islamicists and algebraic topologists every year. Tenure thus lets the academic community avoid excessive turnover while still ensuring the quality of the institution's faculty. It is structured around two assessments -- one at hiring, the other some six years later -- that are far more rigorous than those elsewhere in society and give the institution enough confidence in the ability of the successful candidates to retain them on a permanent basis."

According to Skoble, tenure is essential because it protects academic freedom: not only in cases in which a scholar's politics may run counter to those of their department, institution, or funding bodies, but also and most often in cases when a scholar's work innovates in ways that challenge received wisdom in the field. While stating that it has flaws, she asserts that tenure plays a crucial role in preserving academic freedom.

Skoble argues categorically and plainly against critics that say "tenure protects incompetent professors": "My argument is that when this happens, it is a malfunction of the system, not an intrinsic feature of its proper use. The way it is supposed to work is that incompetent professors do not get tenure in the first place. The rebuttal is 'but they do, therefore tenure is a bad idea.' But that is like arguing that because you ran a red light and caused a train wreck, driving is a bad idea."

According to Perry A. Zirkel, a professor specializing in education law, it is incorrect to blame tenure for the difficulty in firing bad teachers; regardless of tenure, firing a teacher has substantial costs and involves an extended process of hearings and documentation.

== See also ==
- h-index
- LIFO (education)
- Publish or perish
- Up or out
