= Palmyra Methodist Episcopal Church =

- U.S. National Register of Historic Places
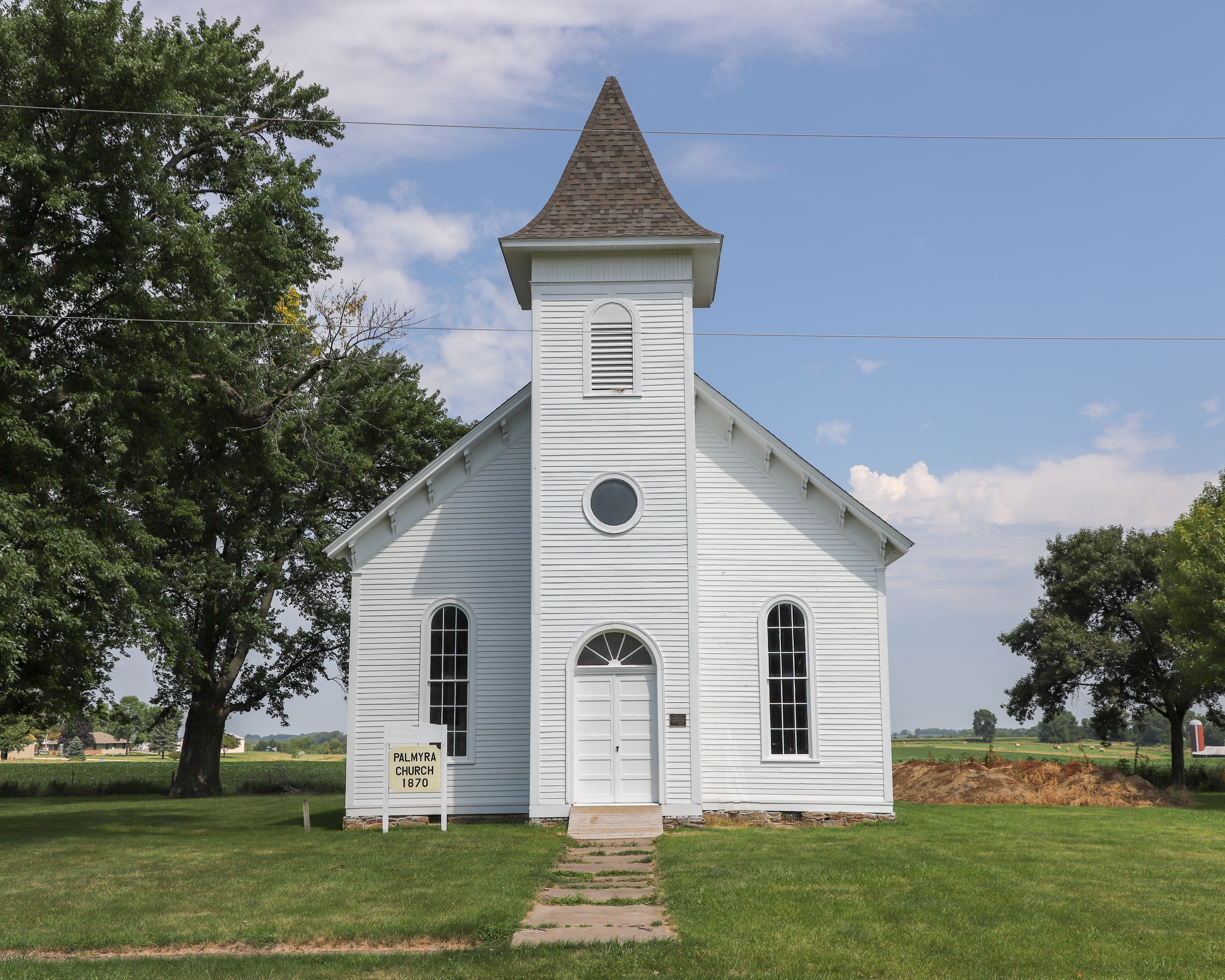
- Palmyra Methodist Episcopal Church, Warren County, Iowa

- Location within Iowa Location within the United States
- Location: Southwest of Hartford, Iowa
- Coordinates: 41°26′04″N 93°26′05″W
- Built: 1868
- Architects: William Wilson Myrick; Eli Myrick
- NRHP reference No.: 79000945
- Added to NRHP: October 1, 1979

Palmyra Methodist Episcopal Church is a historic structure located in the unincorporated community of Palmyra, which is also located in Palmyra Township, Warren County, Iowa, United States. It was built in 1868 and listed on the National Register of Historic Places in 1979. It is the only remaining original building in Palmyra Township.

The frame church building was built by William Wilson Myrick and Eli Myrick. The church hosted Chatauqua revivals through the early 1940s as well as traveling evangelists who would come to the area by train. After it lost its congregation the church sat empty and was nearly torn down in 1978 when Friends of Palmyra Church was formed to save the building. Its contents were sold in 1979. The building was renovated in 1984 and period light fixtures, a pot-bellied stove, leaded windows and pews were installed in the building. Artist P. Buckley Moss has used the church in some of her paintings.

Mold has grown in the ceiling of the church, which has fallen in, and the floors are damaged. The Palmyra Township Trustees and the Palmyra Stitchery Club have raised over $195,000 since 2016 to restore the church and turn it into a community center for Palmyra Township.
