= United Presbyterian Church, Summerset =

Historic church in Iowa, United States

- Scotch Ridge United Presbyterian Church, Carlisle
- U.S. National Register of Historic Places
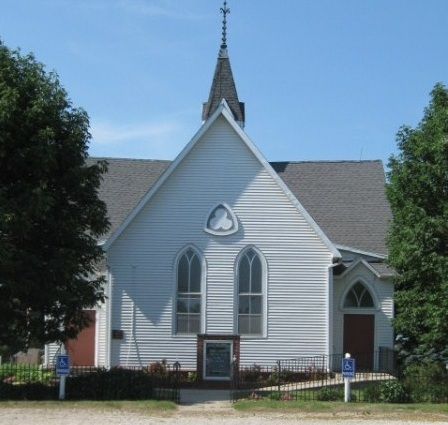

- Location within Iowa Location within the United States
- Location: U.S. Route 65; Scotch Ridge, Iowa
- Coordinates: 41°28′16″N 93°33′38″W
- Built: 1883
- Architectural style: Gothic Revival
- NRHP reference No.: 76000811
- Added to NRHP: November 7, 1976

Scotch Ridge United Presbyterian Church is a historic structure located in the unincorporated community of Scotch Ridge and near the unincorporated community of Summerset in rural Warren County, Iowa, United States. It was built in 1883 and listed on the National Register of Historic Places in 1976. The founders of the church were Scotch-Irish immigrants who could trace their ancestry to Scotland and were proud of their Scottish heritage.

Scotch Ridge United Presbyterian Church was established on August 13, 1853. On that day Robert McElroy went to Chariton, Iowa to get the charter. The first church building was built in 1857 for $1,000. Pete Schooler and his wife sold two acres of the land for $30 on January 3, 1865, for a new Presbyterian Churchyard. On April 28 of the same year William Hastie and his wife sold one acre of adjacent land for $25 for a cemetery. The present frame church building was built in 1883 for $4,000 in the Gothic Revival style. Additional land for the cemetery was added in 1898 and 1971. An additional fellowship hall wing was added in 2010.
