= Hoosier Row School =

- U.S. National Register of Historic Places
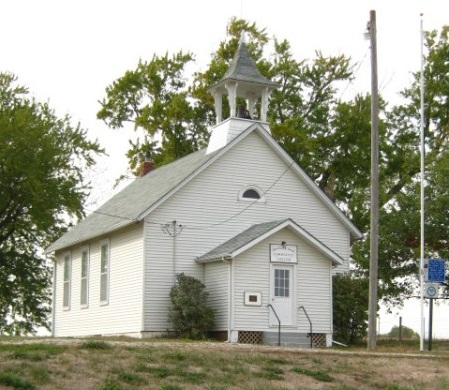

- Location within Iowa Location within the United States
- Location: 15246 County Road R63
- Nearest city: Indianola, Iowa
- Coordinates: 41°18′14″N 93°37′02″W
- Area: 1-acre (0.40 ha)
- Built: 1900
- NRHP reference No.: 11000393
- Added to NRHP: June 23, 2011

Hoosier Row School is a historic building located southwest of Indianola, Iowa, United States. The property for the one-room schoolhouse was acquired by Sub District No. 4, White Oak Township from Alva P. Keeney and Mary J. Keeney on March 10, 1870. They paid $100 for 1-acre (0.40 ha). The present building was constructed in 1900, and now serves as a community center. It was listed on the National Register of Historic Places in 2011.
