= Patience Cleveland =

American actress

- Publicity Photo of Patience Cleveland
- Born: Patience Mather Cleveland; May 23, 1931; New York City, U.S.
- Died: May 27, 2004 (aged 73); Santa Monica, California, U.S.
- Occupations: Actress, writer, diarist
- Relatives: James Colgate Cleveland (brother)

Patience Mather Cleveland (May 23, 1931 – May 27, 2004) was an American film and television actress.

== Early years ==
Cleveland was born in New York City, the youngest of six siblings, to an established New Hampshire family, where she was raised. Her older brother was James Colgate Cleveland. Her parents were Dr. Mather Cleveland and his wife Susan Colgate Cleveland. Her father wrote New Hampshire and the Civil War and The Orthopedic Service at St. Luke's Hospital, New York City, 1859–1968. Her family has longstanding ties to Colby-Sawyer College, where the family papers, including hers, are archived.

Cleveland grew up in New London, New Hampshire. She attended Miss Porter's School in Farmington, Connecticut, before graduating from Smith College. She studied at the French Acting School during her junior year of college. During her time in Paris she studied with René Simon.

== Career ==
Following her college graduation, Cleveland wrote scripts for radio programs for the United States Information Service in Paris, she performed in French theatrical productions. After she returned to the United States she worked in television, writing for Robert Montgomery's program and acting in other shows.

She wrote The Lion Is Busy, a children's book published in 1963. It was made into a record. She made appearances in many television shows, including Seinfeld, Everybody Loves Raymond, That's Life, The Drew Carey Show, Angel, and ER, along with voice roles in other shows such as Harvey Birdman, Attorney at Law and many television commercials. She acted in several feature films, including playing the reclusive Roberta Sparrow, also known as Grandma Death, in Donnie Darko.

On Broadway, Cleveland portrayed Princess Alice in The Apple Cart (1956) and Laura James in Look Homeward, Angel (1957). She appeared in summer stock productions in Florida, New Hampshire, and New Jersey and performed in regional theatrical productions.

Cleveland's work as a print journalist included interviewing celebrities for a large news syndicate.

== Personal life and death ==
Cleveland married French-born American character actor Peter Schuyler Hobbs on August 28, 1965, at her parents' home in New London or on October 24, 1965, in Los Angeles. The union was apparently childless and ended in divorce in 1968.

Cleveland died from cancer in Santa Monica, California, four days after her 73rd birthday.

== Partial filmography ==
Year	Title	Role	Notes
1967	Fitzwilly	Dolly	n/a
1978	Rabbit Test	First Dancing Lady	n/a
1983	Lies	Aunt Louise	n/a
1986	Psycho III	Sister Margaret	n/a
1986	The Whoopee Boys	Wedding Guest	n/a
1989	Nowhere to Run	Grandma Franklin	n/a
1997	Everybody Loves Raymond	Phyllis	1 Episode
2000	Get Your Stuff	Lillian	n/a
2001	Donnie Darko	Roberta Sparrow / Grandma Death	n/a
2002	Taking the Wheel	The Mother	n/a
