= Octagon Barn, Otter Township =

- U.S. National Register of Historic Places
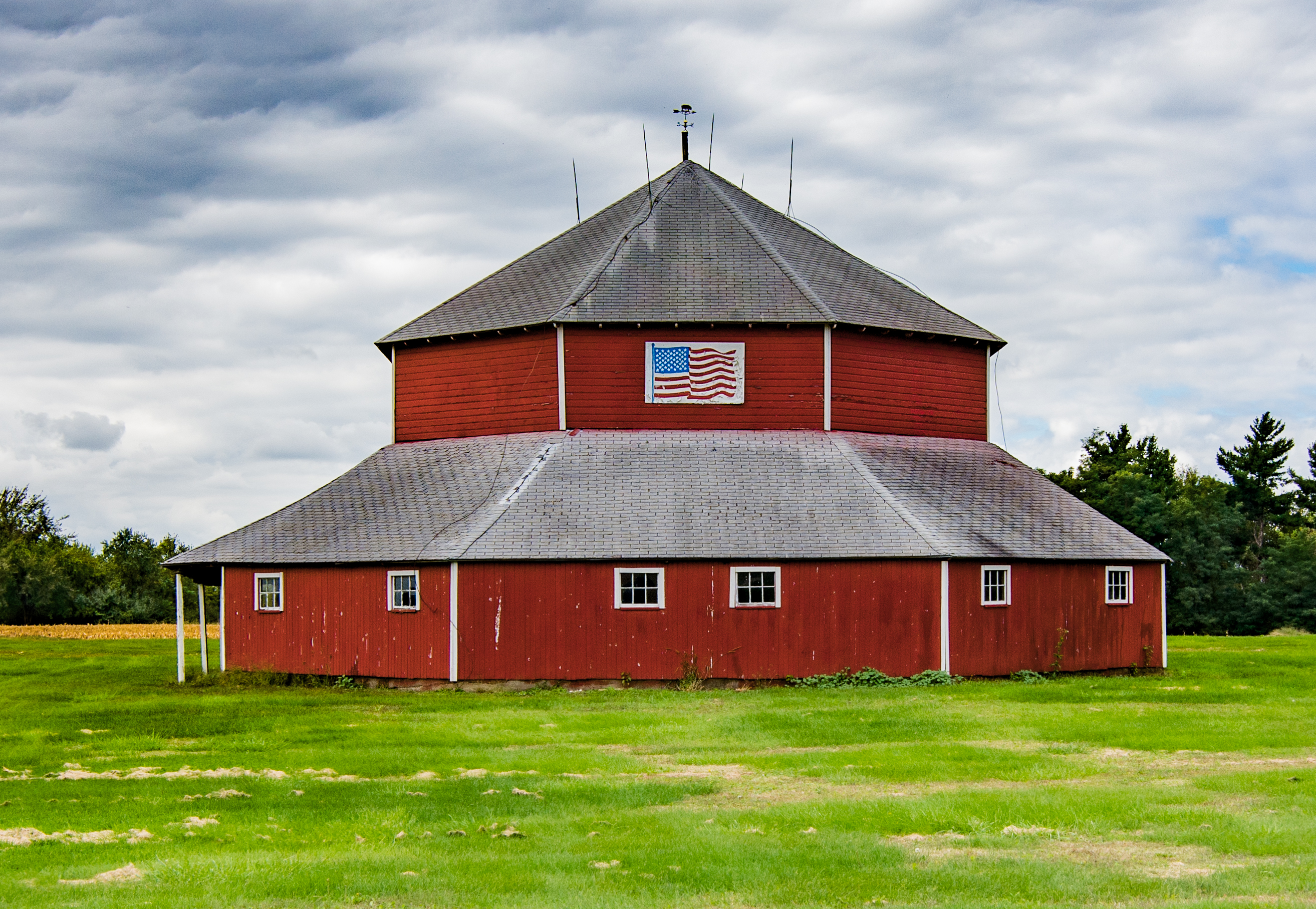

- Location within Iowa Location within the United States
- Location: Off Iowa Highway 205
- Nearest city: Milo, Iowa
- Coordinates: 41°16′7″N 93°26′35″W
- Area: less than one acre
- Built: 1900
- MPS: Iowa Round Barns: The Sixty Year Experiment TR
- NRHP reference No.: 86001448
- Added to NRHP: June 30, 1986

The Octagon Barn, Otter Township is a historic building located near Milo in rural Warren County, Iowa, United States. It was built in 1900 as a horse and dairy barn. The octagon-shaped building measures 54 feet (16 m) in diameter. The structure features a tall center section with a winged shed around it. It is covered in red horizontal siding and is topped by a sectional conical roof. It has been listed on the National Register of Historic Places since 1986.
