= Simpson College =

Methodist college in Indianola, Iowa, US

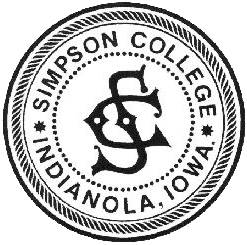
- Former names: Indianola Male and Female Seminary (1860–1865); Des Moines Conference Seminary (1865–1867); Simpson Centenary College (1867–1885)
- Type: Private college
- Established: 1860; 166 years ago
- Accreditation: HLC
- Religious affiliation: United Methodist Church
- Academic affiliations: CIC; NASM
- Endowment: $145,937,553
- President: Susan Stuebner
- Dean: CoryAnne Harrigan
- Faculty: 75 full-time & 113 part-time
- Students: 1,151 (fall 2022)
- Undergraduates: 1,127 (fall 2022)
- Postgraduates: 24 (fall 2022)
- Location: Indianola, Iowa, United States; 41°21′52.2″N 93°33′54.0″W
- Campus: Suburban, 85 acres (34 ha)
- Colors: Red; Gold
- Nickname: The Storm
- Sporting affiliations: American Rivers Conference
- Mascot: Thunder the Elephant
- Website: simpson.edu
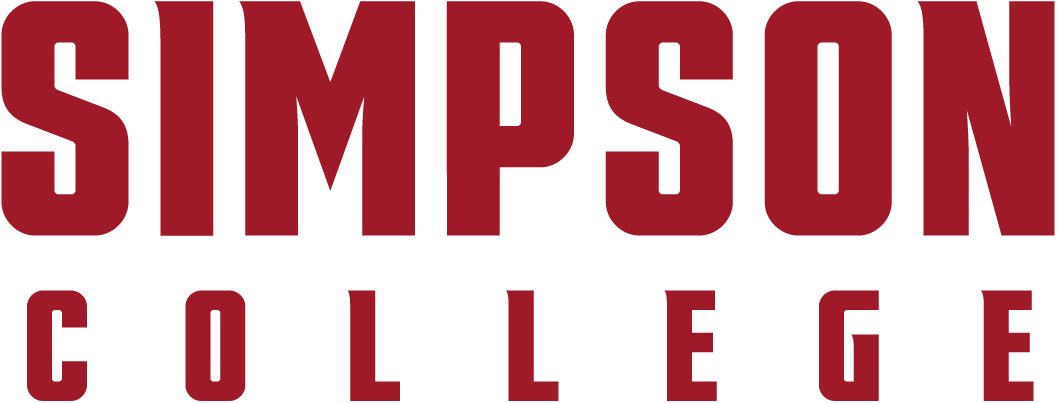

Simpson College is a private Methodist college in Indianola, Iowa. It is accredited by the Higher Learning Commission and enrolled 1,151 students in fall 2022.

== History ==
Indianola Male and Female Seminary opened on September 24, 1860, and the name was changed to the Des Moines Conference Seminary in September 1865. On September 21, 1867, the school was upgraded to a college and renamed Simpson Centenary College to honor Methodism's then most renowned living bishop, Matthew Simpson, and to celebrate the centennial of American Methodism. In June 1885, "Centenary" was dropped from the name, becoming simply Simpson College.

=== Presidents ===
- Susan Stuebner (2025–present)
- Terry Handley (acting; 2025)
- Jay Byers (2023–2025)
- Marsha Kelliher (2020–2023)
- Jay Simmons (2013–2019)
- John Byrd (2005–2013)
- Kevin LaGree (1999–2005)
- Stephen G. Jennings (1987–1998)
- Robert Edward McBride (1979–1987)
- Richard Bailey Lancaster (1972–1979)
- Ralph Candler John (1963–1972)
- William Edward Kerstetter (1953–1963)
- Edwin Edgar Voigt (1942–1952)
- Earl Enyeart Harper (1936–1938)
- John Linnaeus Hillman (1919–1936)
- James Watson Campbell (1916–1919)
- William Ennis Hamilton (1915–1916)
- Charles Eldred Shelton (1899–1910)
- Joseph Benton Harris (1898–1899)
- Fletcher Brown (1892–1898)
- Edmund Meek Holmes (1889–1892)
- William Ennis Hamilton (1886–1889)
- Edward Lamay Parks (1880–1886)
- Thomas S. Berry (1878–1880)
- Alexander Burns (1868–1878)
- Samuel Milton Vernon (1866–1868)

== Campus ==
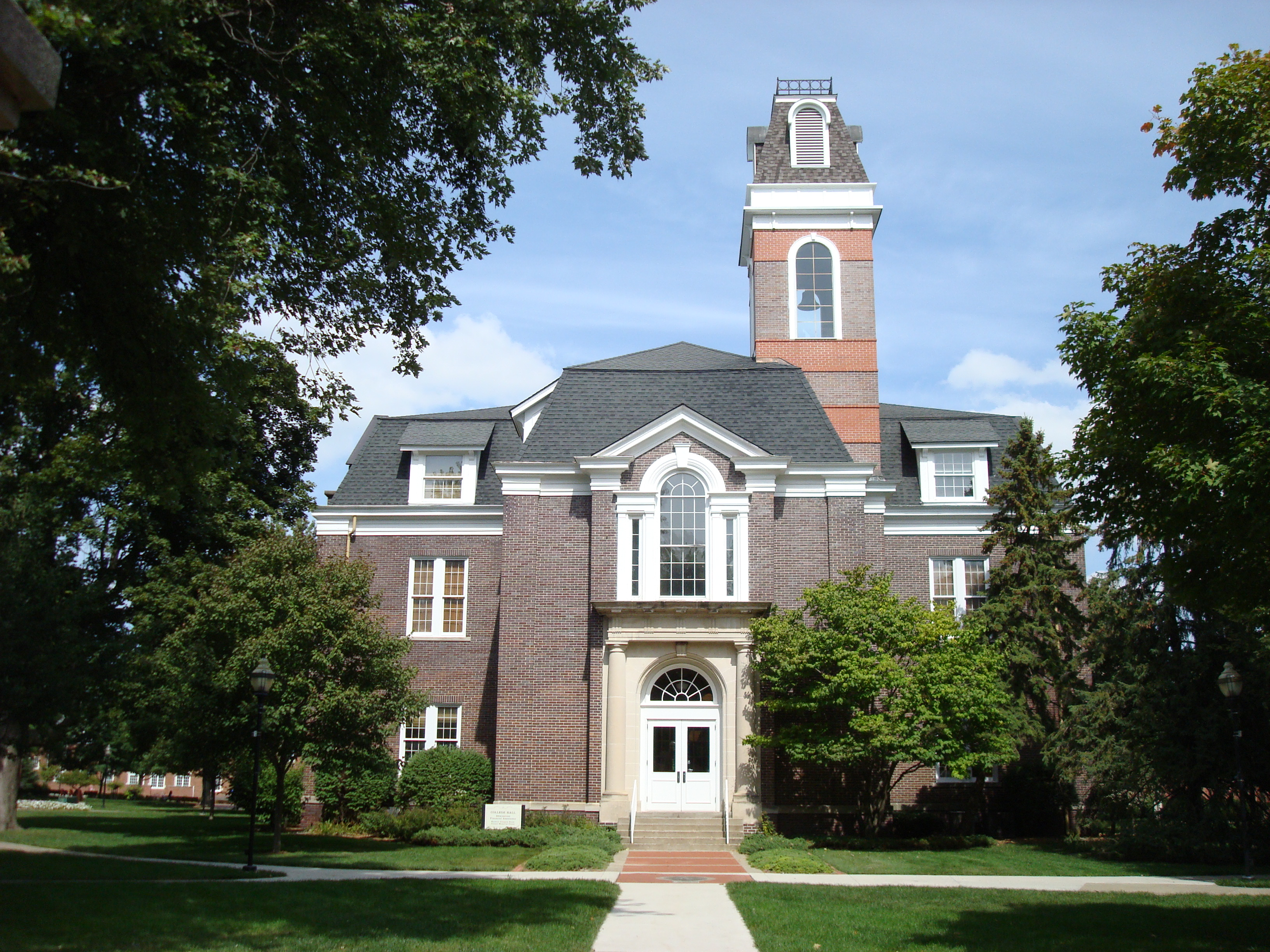
Historic College Hall (formerly Old Chapel)

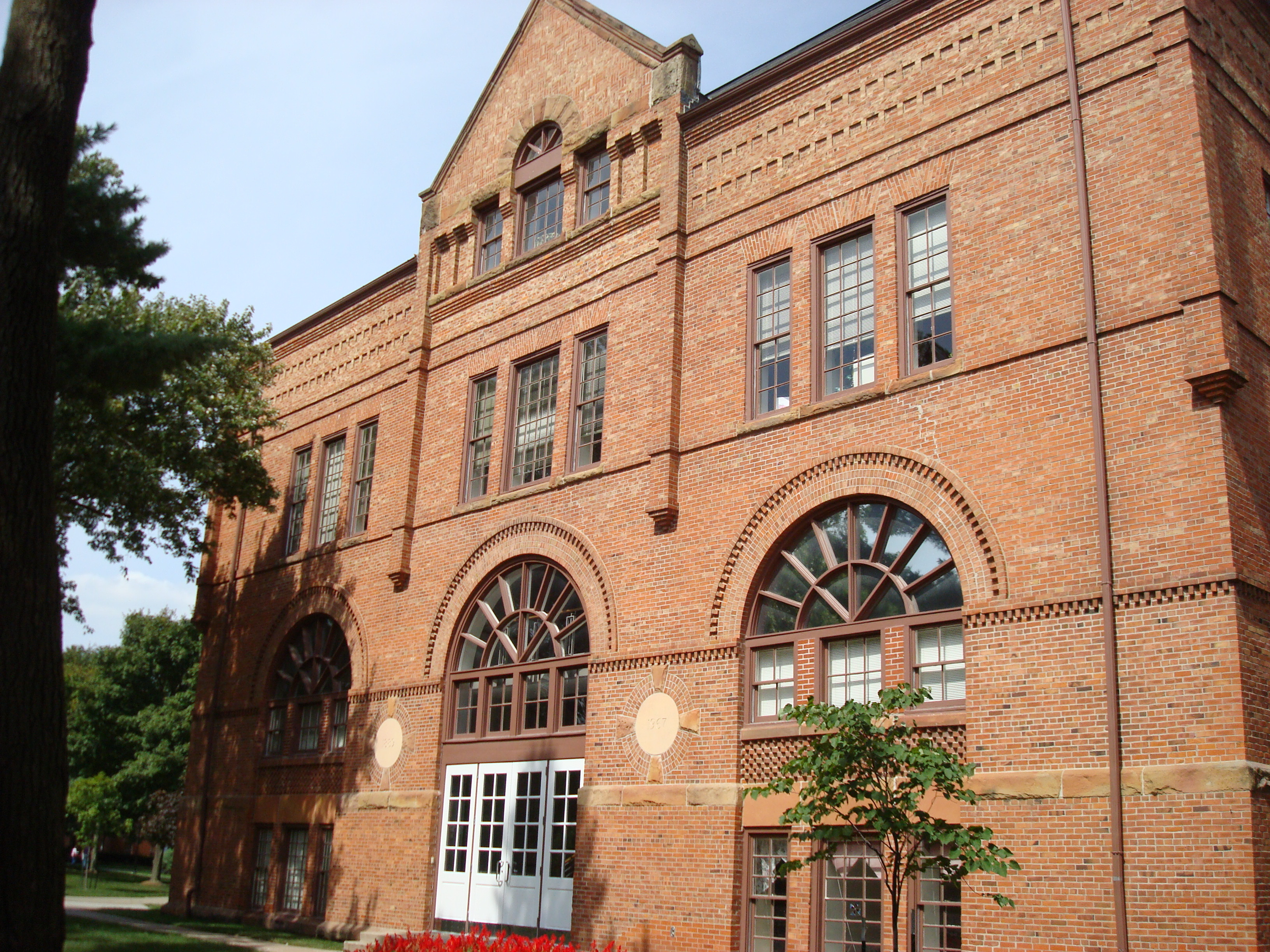
Wallace Hall (formerly Science Hall) housed George Washington Carver's first college classrooms

Other notable construction includes the 55,000-square-foot Kent Family Campus Center, which replaced the old Brenton Student Center as the center of student life. The 85-acre (340,000 m^{2}) tree-lined campus is bordered on the north by Buxton Park Arboretum. The architecture blends tradition with modernity. The theater building, an example of the Brutalist architecture that dominated American campus construction in the 1970s, was renovated and added on to in 2010–11, softening its features.

Simpson invested in what has been dubbed the most innovative artificial turf system in the world, FieldTurf Revolution. A new-era Beynon BSS 1000 running track was also installed for the 2011–12 school year. The renovation of Simpson's athletic facilities ended in 2014 with the construction of a new bi-level weight room in the former pool area. This move was made possible by constructing the Indianola YMCA, which has a 25-yard pool and hosts swimming meets for Simpson College, Indianola High School, and the YMCA Tide swim team.

== Organization and administration ==
The college had an endowment of $78.6 million as of February 10, 2017.

== Athletics ==
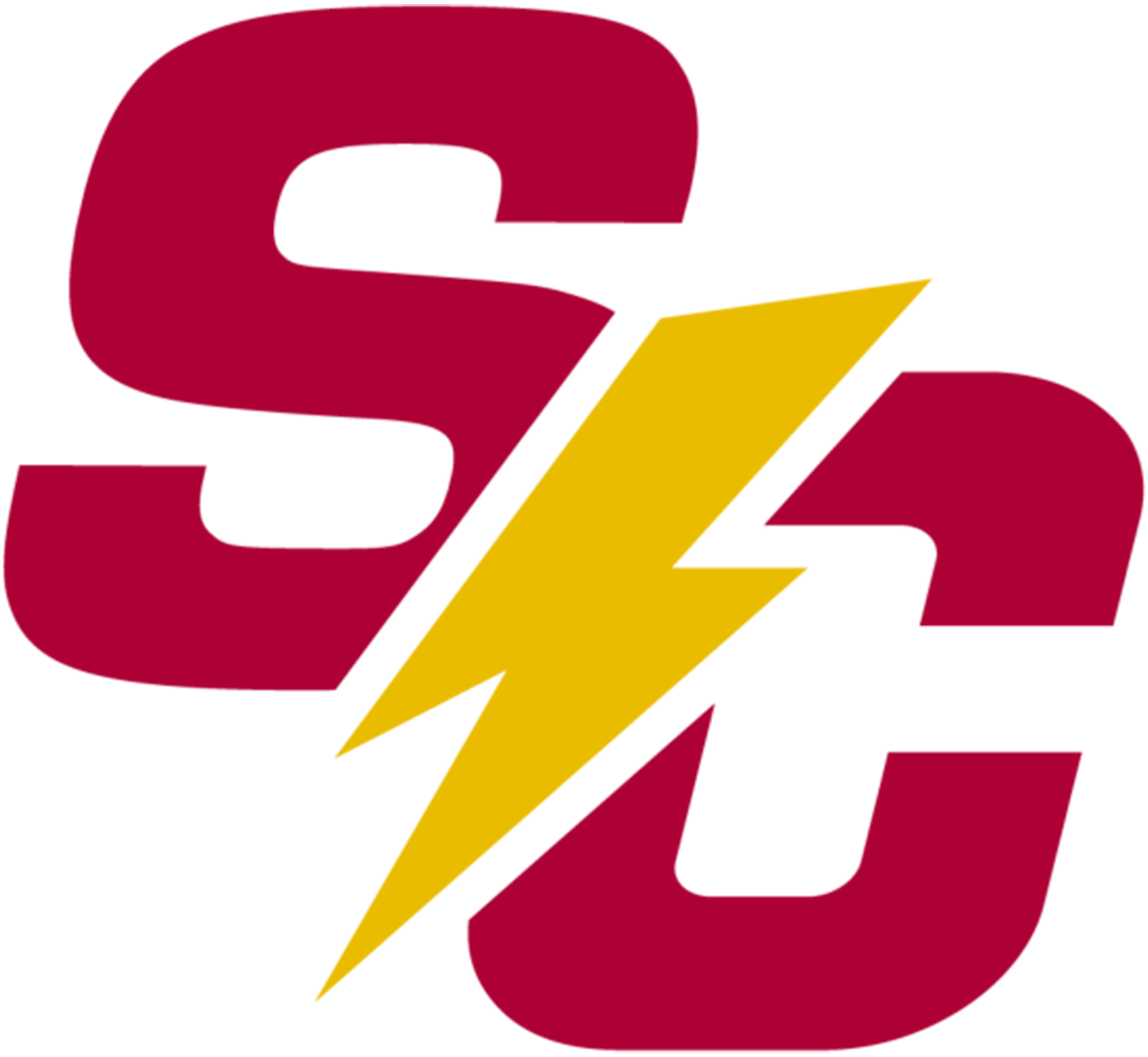
Simpson Storm logo

Simpson College athletic teams are nicknamed the Storm. They compete in the American Rivers Conference in NCAA Division III. Simpson fields men's teams in baseball, basketball, cross country, American football, golf, gymnastics,soccer, tennis, track and field, and wrestling. Women's teams include basketball, cross country, golf, gymnastics, soccer, softball, tennis, track & field, and volleyball. Simpson also fields cheerleading and dance squads.

The Simpson College softball team won the NCAA Division III National Championship in 1997 and 1999. Simpson's softball team appeared in one Women's College World Series in 1971.

== Student life ==
Simpson ranks among the nation's top 100 colleges in the percentage of students who study abroad, according to U.S. News & World Report.

The Simpsonian is the student newspaper, first published in 1870. Sequel is an annual Simpson literary arts magazine, assembled from student and faculty contributions including paintings, photographs, drawings, short fiction, and short non-fiction. KSTM, 88.9, is a student-operated radio station.

=== John C. Culver Public Policy Center ===
The Culver Center was established at Simpson College in 2010 to honor the service of John Culver, a former Iowa senator and congressman. The program awards four-year scholarships to select incoming Simpson students who demonstrate a commitment to public service and civic engagement. The annual John C. Culver Lecture brings a prominent public service or political figure to campus to meet with students and deliver a lecture open to the public. Lectures have included Senator George McGovern, political journalist Mark Shields, Supreme Court reporter Linda Greenhouse, and former Secretary of Defense Chuck Hagel.

== Notable people ==
- Mary Alice Barton (1917–2003), quilt historian and philanthropist
- Nate Boulton, politician, Iowa state senator
- Chad Buchanan, General Manager of the Indiana Pacers of the National Basketball Association
- George Washington Carver, agricultural scientist and inventor. Carver Science Hall is named after him
- Avery Craven (1885–1980), historian. The Avery O. Craven Room of Dunn Library at Simpson holds Craven's library of over 2,000 volumes, notes, manuscripts, correspondence, and memorabilia
- Malcolm A. Love (1904–1990), president of the University of Nevada (1950–51) and San Diego State University (1952–71)
- David Orr, Chicago Alderman, 52nd Mayor of Chicago and Cook County Clerk
- Wanda Brownlee Paige (born 1956), member of Kansas House of Representatives (2024–present)
- Ruth Hinshaw Spray (1848–1929), peace activist
- Evan Tanner, professional mixed martial arts fighter, Ultimate Fighting Championship middleweight champion
- Jeannette Throckmorton (1883-1963), physician, quilter
- Alice Bellvadore Sams Turner (1859–1915), physician, writer
