= Warren County Administration Building =

- Indianola High School
- U.S. National Register of Historic Places
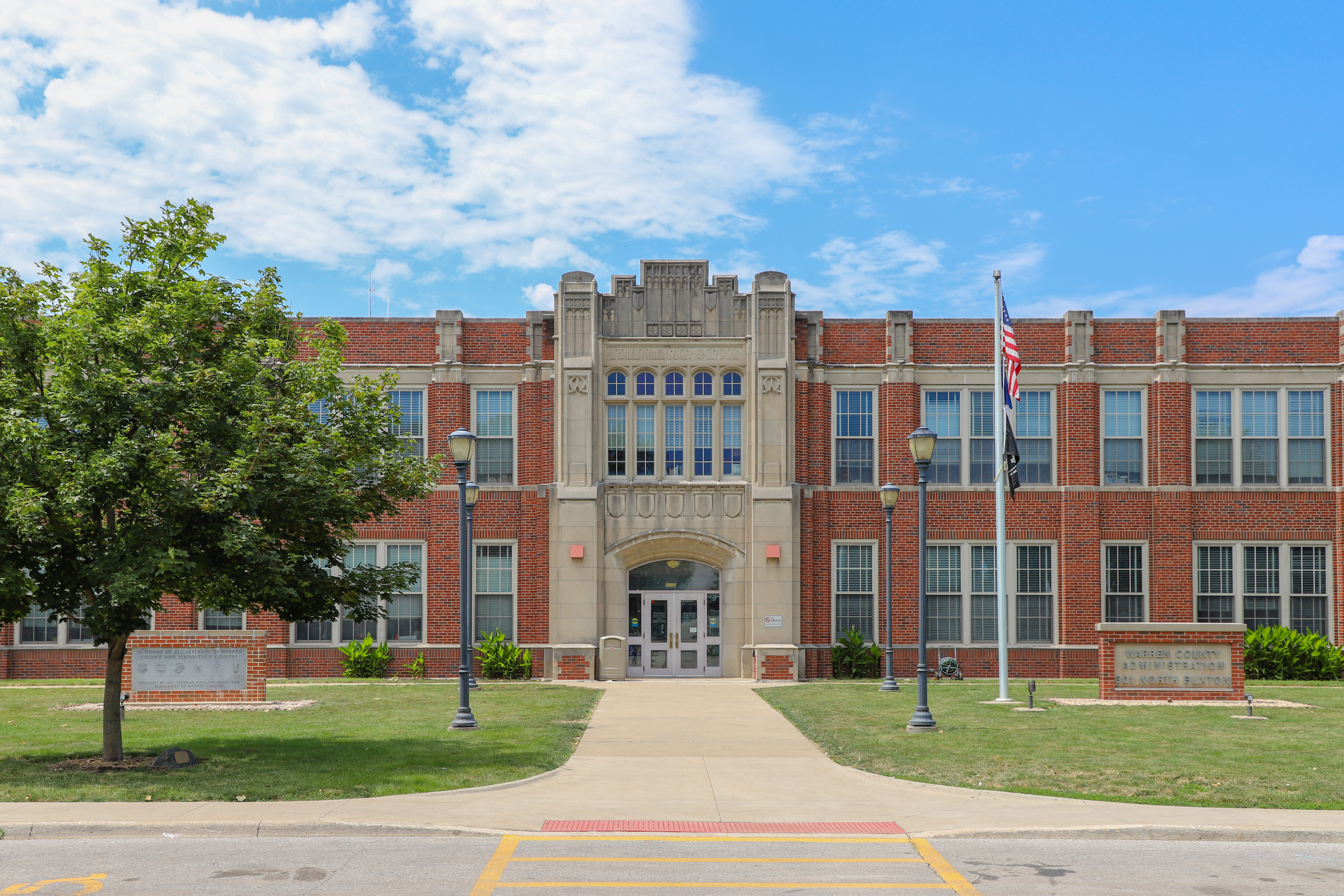
- Warren County Administration Building, formerly Indianola High School, Indianola, Iowa

- Location within Iowa Location within the United States
- Location: 301 N. Buxton; Indianola, Iowa
- Coordinates: 41°21′46″N 93°33′46″W
- Area: 2 acres (0.81 ha)
- Built: 1925
- Architect: Grahn & Rathurst
- Architectural style: Late Gothic Revival
- MPS: Public Schools for Iowa: Growth and Change MPS
- NRHP reference No.: 02001247
- Added to NRHP: October 24, 2002

The Warren County Administration Building, formerly Indianola High School, is located in Indianola, Iowa, United States. The first high school in town was designed by the Des Moines architectural firm of Proudfoot & Bird. It was completed in 1904 and an annex was added in 1917 because of increased enrollment. Irving School (1876), housed grades 1-8 and was condemned by the city council in 1924. The Independent School District of Indianola decided to build a new building to house the high school and elementary grades. The Minneapolis architectural firm of Grahn & Rathurst was chosen the design the $180,000 building. Completed in 1925, the first floor housed grades 1-6 and the second floor housed grades 10–12. The old high school building, no longer extant, became the junior high school building. The interior of the brick, Late Gothic Revival structure has a U-shaped hallway with a gymnasium/auditorium in the middle and classrooms on the outer perimeter. After a new middle school was built in Indianola, this building was renovated between 1997 and 1999 for the Warren County Administration Building. It was listed on the National Register of Historic Places in 2002.
