= Wallace Hall (Simpson College) =

- Science Hall
- U.S. National Register of Historic Places
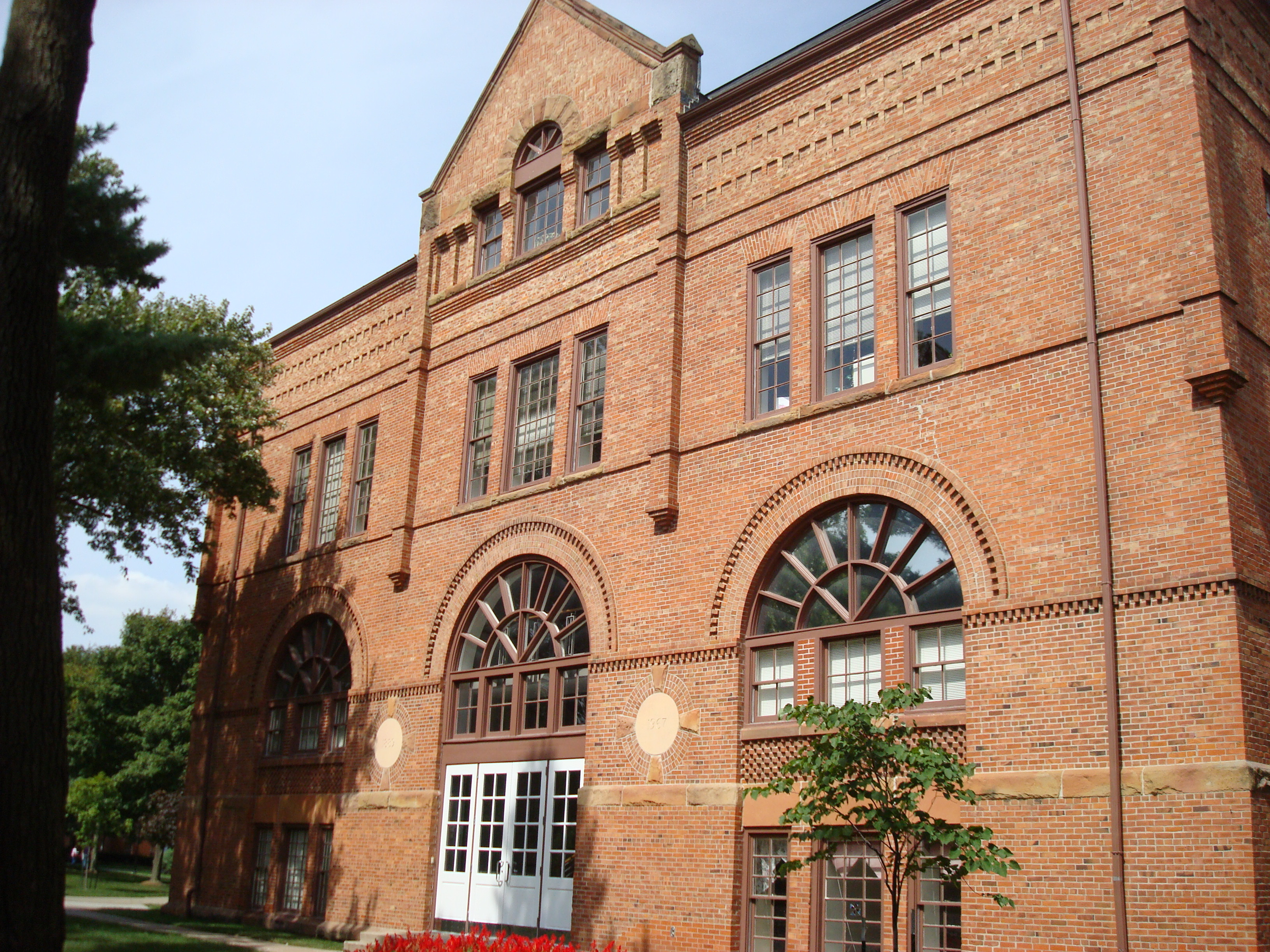

- Location within Iowa Location within the United States
- Location: Simpson College campus Indianola, Iowa
- Coordinates: 41°18′14″N 93°37′02″W
- Area: less than one acre
- Built: 1888
- Architect: William T. Proudfoot
- Architectural style: Romanesque Revival
- MPS: Architectural Legacy of Proudfoot & Bird in Iowa MPS
- NRHP reference No.: 91000535
- Added to NRHP: May 8, 1991

Wallace Hall, formerly known as Science Hall, is a historic building located on the campus of Simpson College in Indianola, Iowa, United States. The 2½-story, brick structure was designed by Wichita, Kansas architect, and Indianola native, William T. Proudfoot. He would become partner in the prominent Des Moines architectural firm of Proudfoot & Bird. This is the firm's earliest known extant building in Iowa. The Romanesque Revival style is found in the round arched openings, stone trim, decorative brickwork, prominent gables centered at the front and rear elevations, and slender turrets on the corners. The building was completed in 1888. George Washington Carver studied art in the attic classroom while attending Simpson in 1890–1891. A new science hall was completed in 1956, and named for Carver. This building remained vacant for the most part, and suffered a fire a few years later. It was eventually renovated, and on June 4, 1967, it was rededicated and at that time was renamed. It now honors Henry A. Wallace, a geneticist and former Vice President of the United States. It was listed on the National Register of Historic Places in 1991.
