= Coal Creek Bridge (Carlisle, Iowa) =

- U.S. National Register of Historic Places
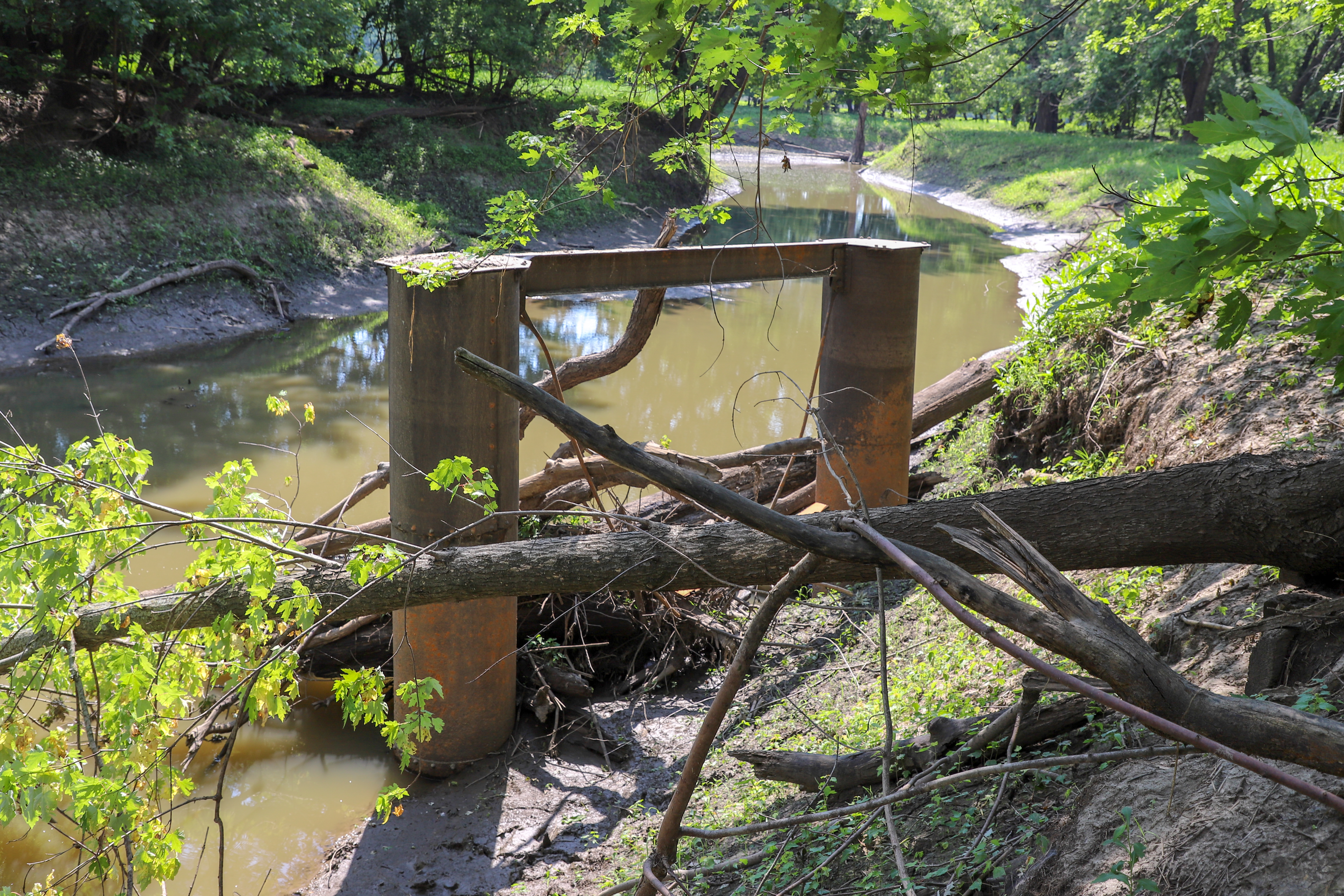
- The remains of the bridge.

- Location within Iowa Location within the United States
- Location: 2404 Fillmore St. over Coal Creek
- Nearest city: Carlisle, Iowa
- Coordinates: 41°25′44″N 93°20′46″W
- Area: less than one acre
- Built: 1889
- Built by: Seevers Manufacturing Co.
- Architectural style: Pratt pony truss
- MPS: Highway Bridges of Iowa MPS
- NRHP reference No.: 98000473
- Added to NRHP: May 15, 1998

The Coal Creek Bridge was located southeast of Carlisle, Iowa, United States. The 88-foot (27 m) span carried traffic on Fillmore Street over Coal Creek. The Warren County Board of Supervisors contracted with the Seevers Manufacturing Company of Oskaloosa, Iowa to build this bridge. The Pratt pony truss was completed in 1889. It was the only example of this type of bridge built by the company left in Iowa. It was listed on the National Register of Historic Places in 1998, The bridge was taken down in 2008.
