= Richard P. Chait =

Scholar of higher education

Richard P. Chait (born 1944) is an American scholar of higher education and Professor Emeritus of Education at the Harvard Graduate School of Education, where he was a faculty member for seventeen years. He is an expert on the terms and conditions of faculty employment and on the roles, responsibilities, and performance of nonprofit and college boards of trustees. He has also researched and written extensively on faculty work life, including advocacy for more equitable treatment of underrepresented minorities. Near the end of his career, Chait was known as "one of the nation’s leading authorities on higher education governance."

== Early life and education ==
Chait was born and raised in Newark, New Jersey. He attended Rutgers University–New Brunswick and in 1966, graduated Phi Beta Kappa with a Bachelor of Arts in American History. That same year, he enrolled at the University of Wisconsin, Madison, and wrote a thesis, "Frederick Douglass and American Politics," toward earning a Master of Arts in American History in 1967. He proceeded to enroll in the UW Madison's doctoral program in Educational Administration (Higher Education). His dissertation, "The Desegregation of American Higher Education: A Legal History", earned him a Ph.D. in 1972.

== Academic career ==
Chait began his career in higher education in 1971 at Stockton State College in Pomona, New Jersey, first as Assistant for Academic Planning, then as Assistant to the President and Assistant Professor of History. In 1974, he left Stockton State for the Harvard Graduate School of Education (HGSE) to become Administrative Director of the Institute for Educational Management (IEM), an executive leadership program for senior administrators in higher education. He was elevated to be the program's Educational Chairman in 1977, the same year he earned an appointment as Assistant Professor. In 1980 he left Harvard to be Assistant Provost and Associate Professor of Education (Affiliate) at the Pennsylvania State University, University Park. He served there as Associate Provost from 1981 until 1984. From 1985 to 1986, Chait served Case Western Reserve University as Mandel Professor of Non-Profit Management in the School of Applied Social Sciences and Weatherhead School of Management, as well as Director of the Mandel Center for Non-Profit Organizations. He moved to the College of Education at University of Maryland, College Park in 1986 to become Professor of Higher Education and Management (1986-1996) and Executive Director of the National Center for Postsecondary Governance and Finance (1986-1990). Finally, he returned to the Harvard Graduate School of Education in 1996 as Professor of Higher Education, a position he held until becoming Research Professor in 2007 and, in 2013, Professor Emeritus of Education.

=== Research ===
==== Harvard Project on Faculty Appointments ====
Chait served as Principal Investigator on the Harvard Project on Faculty Appointments (HPFA), funded by a $1.9 million grant from The Pew Charitable Trusts to compile a database of faculty appointment types across a wide range of higher education institutional types; to support 10 universities to engage in related research projects; and to compile a report for policy makers and the media. The project activities also included a two-day symposium in 1998 for journalists and higher education leaders. Chait's lessons from the project appeared in several publications, culminating in a volume he edited, The Questions of Tenure. The goal of the volume's contributors, Chait wrote, was a book "different in substance and in tone from [the] polemics," but one that instead "would inform discussions of faculty work life through research-based, data-driven answers to important, practical, and frequently posted questions about tenure policy and practice." It was favorably reviewed in higher education journals and the press.

==== The Study of New Scholars / The Collaborative on Academic Careers in Higher Education (COACHE) ====
In 2002, the Project on Faculty Appointments became The Study of New Scholars, evolving due to a combined $1 million in funding from the Atlantic Philanthropies and the Ford Foundation. The project's declared intentions were:

1. To make the academy a more equitable and appealing place for new faculty to work in order to ensure that academic institutions attract the best and brightest scholars and teachers; and,
2. To increase the recruitment, retention, status, success, and satisfaction of women and minority faculty members.

The project began with a survey of pre-tenure faculty at six liberal arts colleges and six research universities. The findings, published in three reports, established evidence of statistically significant differences in the experiences of faculty depending on their gender, their race/ethnicity, and the types of institutions that employ them.

In 2005, Chait reoriented the Study of New Scholars as The Collaborative on Academic Careers in Higher Education (COACHE), a survey research and faculty leadership development project still hosted at the Harvard Graduate School of Education. After stepping away from his teaching responsibilities at Harvard, Chait remained an advisor and Principal Investigator to COACHE until his retirement from the university in 2013.

==== Governance as Leadership ====
With co-authors William Ryan and Barbara Taylor, Chait in 2005 published Governance as Leadership: Reframing the Work on Nonprofit Boards. The book's central concept is "that there are three different modes of governance: fiduciary, strategic, and generative, and all of these modes are important." The Council for Advancement and Support of Education (CASE) honored Chait and his co-authors with its John Grenzebach Award for Outstanding Research in Philanthropy. CASE noted that the volume "highlights theories that have transformed the practice of organizational leadership and offers a new framework for governance within nonprofit organizations." The book was also the winner of the 2005 Skystone Ryan Prize for Research from the Association of Fundraising Professionals.

== Criticism ==
By the late 1990s, Chait earned a reputation as "a leading voice on tenure reform" for his "well-known work on alternatives to tenure". Some in higher education viewed Chait as an "enemy of tenure," although Chait defended his research:

"It’s entirely possible to be an agnostic who studies religion. I have a rather agnostic view on tenure: If the practice serves the purposes of the institution and the welfare of the faculty, why change?"

The controversies surrounding Chait subsided with the publication of The Questions of Tenure and his subsequent focus on nonprofit board governance.

== Honors and awards ==
Chait holds honorary degrees from Maryville College (1997), Notre Dame College (1997), and Towson University (1999). He is the recipient of a Distinguished American Fulbright Lectureship to New Zealand (2001), a Distinguished Alumnus Award from the University of Wisconsin–Madison School of Education (1999), and an Outstanding Teacher from Harvard University (2004). In 2005, Chait was awarded the Council of Independent Colleges (CIC) Academic Leadership Award for "his pathbreaking research on the management and governance of colleges and universities."
