= Claude de Picques =

French bookbinder

Claude de Picques (c. 1510 – 1574 or 1578) was an influential French bookbinder. He was closely connected with the court of King Henry II of France, serving as the personal bookbinder to Queen Catherine de' Medici from 1553 and as the personal bookbinder to the King himself from 1556 to 1574. He is thought also to have been one of the binders who worked for Thomas Mahieu.

De Picques is acknowledged to have created some of the finest decorative bindings of his era. France was taking over from Italy as the center of artistic bookbinding during the early sixteenth century. Political upheaval in Italy, the Sack of Rome in 1527, and the French occupation of Milan had caused innovations such as gold tooling to reach to France, where they were swiftly embraced and refined. The Franco-Ottoman alliance brought high-quality morocco leather and an influx of highly proficient gilders. French bookbinders began manufacturing gold-tooled books in 1507. By 1535, they were capable of "large-scale production" exhibiting impressive "decorative effect, beauty of design and skill in execution."

While De Picques was one of the driving forces behind the refinement of his craft, there has been a reassessment of the scope of his activities, as more has become known about the work of Jean Picard and Gomar Estienne. In older studies of French bookbinding De Picques has been associated with a workshop called the "atelier au trèfle" (named after the distinctive use of trefoil motifs). While it is not disputed that De Picques used a trefoil tool, more recent scholarship highlights other binders working in the same style. Current thinking accepts the evidence presented by A.R.A. Hobson that some of the bookbindings which were formerly attributed to the "atelier au trèfle" were not in fact the work of De Picques. In particular, Jean Picard has been credited with a notable series of bindings executed for Grolier in the 1540s.
