= Thomas Mahieu =

Thomas Mahieu (born between 1515 and 1527 – died after 1588), also known as Thomas Maiolus, was a French courtier and bibliophile with a special interest in decorative bookbindings.

Mahieu was advisor and secretary to Henry II of France, personal secretary to Catherine de' Medici from 1549 to 1560, and subsequently Treasurer-General of France. His book collection is considered second only to that of Jean Grolier, who is considered Mahieu's mentor and spiritual father. Mahieu and Grolier used similar Latin ownership inscriptions on their bindings. Mahieu used the Latinized form of his name on bookplates, Maiolus, which for centuries was mistaken for an Italian surname. It was not discovered until 1926 that Maiolus, the otherwise unattested supposed Italian, and Mahieu, the prominent French politician, were the same person. Today, about 120 books are ascribed to Mahieu.

== Bindings ==
France had taken over from Italy as the center of artistic bookbinding during the early sixteenth century. Political upheaval in Italy, the Sack of Rome in 1527, the French occupation of Milan, and the Franco-Ottoman alliance had caused innovations such as gold tooling and the use of high-quality Morocco leather to reach to France, where they were swiftly embraced and refined.

It has proved difficult to identify the binder(s) of many of the Mahieu books. In later years Mahieu favoured plainer styles of binding, but the earlier commissions are distincively rich: punched and gilded backgrounds show a surface of sprinkled dots as a foil for coloured interlacings and arabesques." The tools used by Mahieu's bookbinders have been analysed. The use of trefoil motifs suggested a common origin in a workshop that supplied bindings to Henry, Catherine, and Grolier, the so-called "atelier au trèfle" (meaning workshop of the trefoil). However, recent scholarship has thrown more light on the "atelier au trèfle" and the binders who worked for the royal family and Grolier. The British Library's bindings catalogue attributes one of Mahieu's bindings to Claude Picques and another to Gomar Estienne. The Bibliothèque nationale de France also credits these two royal binders with commissions for Mahieu. The last binding known to be due to Mahieu was manufactured in 1588.
