= Nicolas Grollier de Servière =

French inventor and engineer

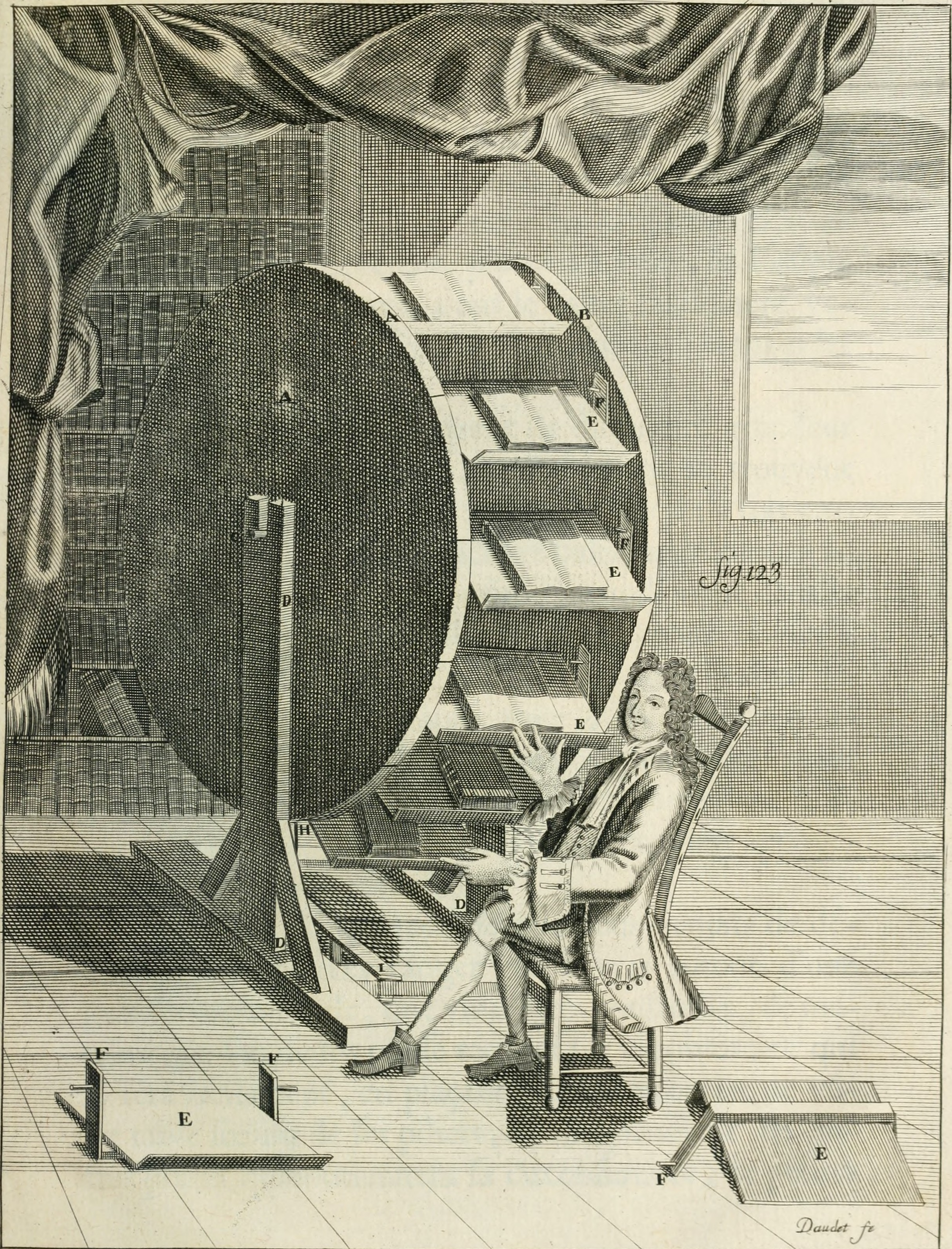
- Grollier's reading wheel
- Born: 1596; Lyon, France
- Died: 1689; Lyon, France
- Occupation(s): Model maker, inventor and wood turner

Nicolas Grollier de Servière (1596–1689) was a French inventor and ornamental turner who became well known for creating a series of fantastic machines.

Grollier de Servière, a cousin of Jean Grolier de Servières (1489/90–1565), Treasurer of France and famed bibliophile, was born in Lyon, the fourth son of Antoine Grollier de Servière and in his youth followed a military career that took him to Flanders, Germany, Italy and Constantinople; as an engineer, he specialized in deploying movable bridges in the field. After he retired to his home in Lyon, he worked on ornamental lathe-work and built a series of fantastic models. He displayed his work in a cabinet that he opened to the public once a week and which became famous enough to attract politicians, scholars, artisans and other inventors. It featured model water pumps and Archimedes' screws, siege engines, designs of floating bridges and clocks regulated by balls travelling down inclined planes or along spiral tracks, machines to trace landscape and to convert plan images into perspective, odometers with reducing gears, wheelchairs, many intricate pieces of lathe-work in ivory and wood, and an improved version of Agostino Ramelli's reading wheel that allowed many books to be read by means of a rotating wheel. Eventually even Louis XIV paid a visit to Grollier de Servière.

After his death in 1689, his son Gaspard (1646–1716) and then his grandson Gaspard II (1676–1745) continued to display the contents of the cabinet, and his son published a book cataloguing the curiosities: Recueil d'Ouvrages Curieux de Mathématique et de Mécanique, ou Description du Cabinet de Monsieur Grollier de Servière. Charles Plumier, who visited the cabinet after Nicholas Grollier de Serviere's death, wrote the first book about wood turning, L'Art du Tourneur (The Art of the Turner), in 1701. A model of a water driven pile-driver which Grollier de Servière had built on his grounds was given to Stephen Demainbray in 1754 and is now preserved in the George III Collection in the London Science Museum.
