= Bibliotheca Thysiana =

1655 library in Leiden, The Netherlands

Coordinates: 52°09′33″N 4°29′4″E

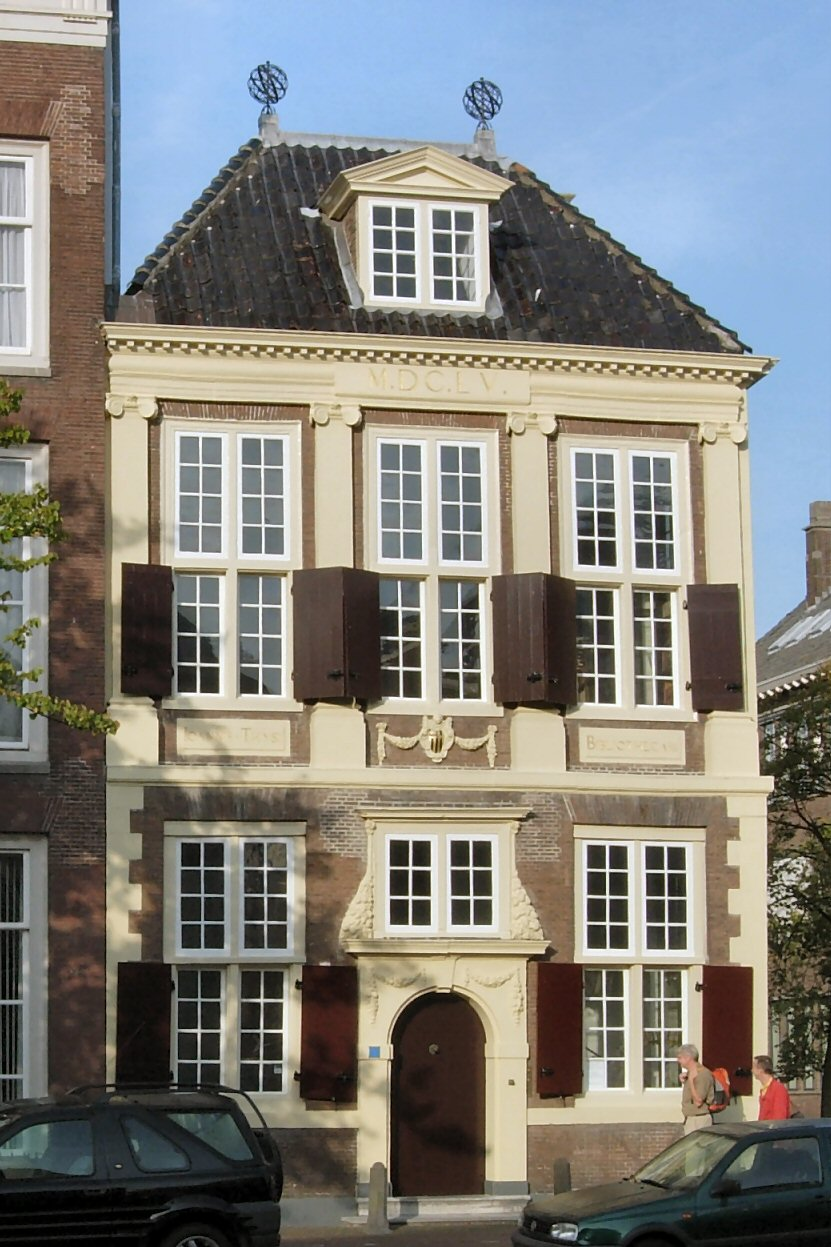
- Bibliotheca Thysiana in 2006
- Location: Leiden, The Netherlands
- Type: Public library
- Established: 1655 (371 years ago)
- Architect: Arent van 's-Gravesande

Collection
- Size: 2,500 volumes

The Bibliotheca Thysiana was erected in 1655 to house the book collection of the lawyer Johannes Thysius (1621–1653). Upon his early death, he left a legacy of 20,000 guilders for the building of a public library ("tot publycque dienst der studie") with a custodian's dwelling. Designed by the architect Arent van ‘s-Gravensande, the building follows the Dutch Classical style and is regarded as one of the jewels of Dutch 17th-century architecture. Bibliotheca Thysiana is one of the Top 100 Dutch heritage sites. It is distinguished by its balanced proportions and the purity of its Ionic order on top of a high basement.

The Bibliotheca Thysiana is the only surviving 17th century example in the Netherlands of a building that was designed as a public library. It is quite extraordinary that a complete private 17th century library has been preserved and thus offers a good impression of the book collection of a young, learned bibliophile from the period of late Humanism. The collection contains about 2,500 books and thousands of pamphlets in all scientific fields. The library also houses one of the 14 still existing bookwheels in the world.

The library has a separate special collection of several hundred books from and about Emanuel Swedenborg.

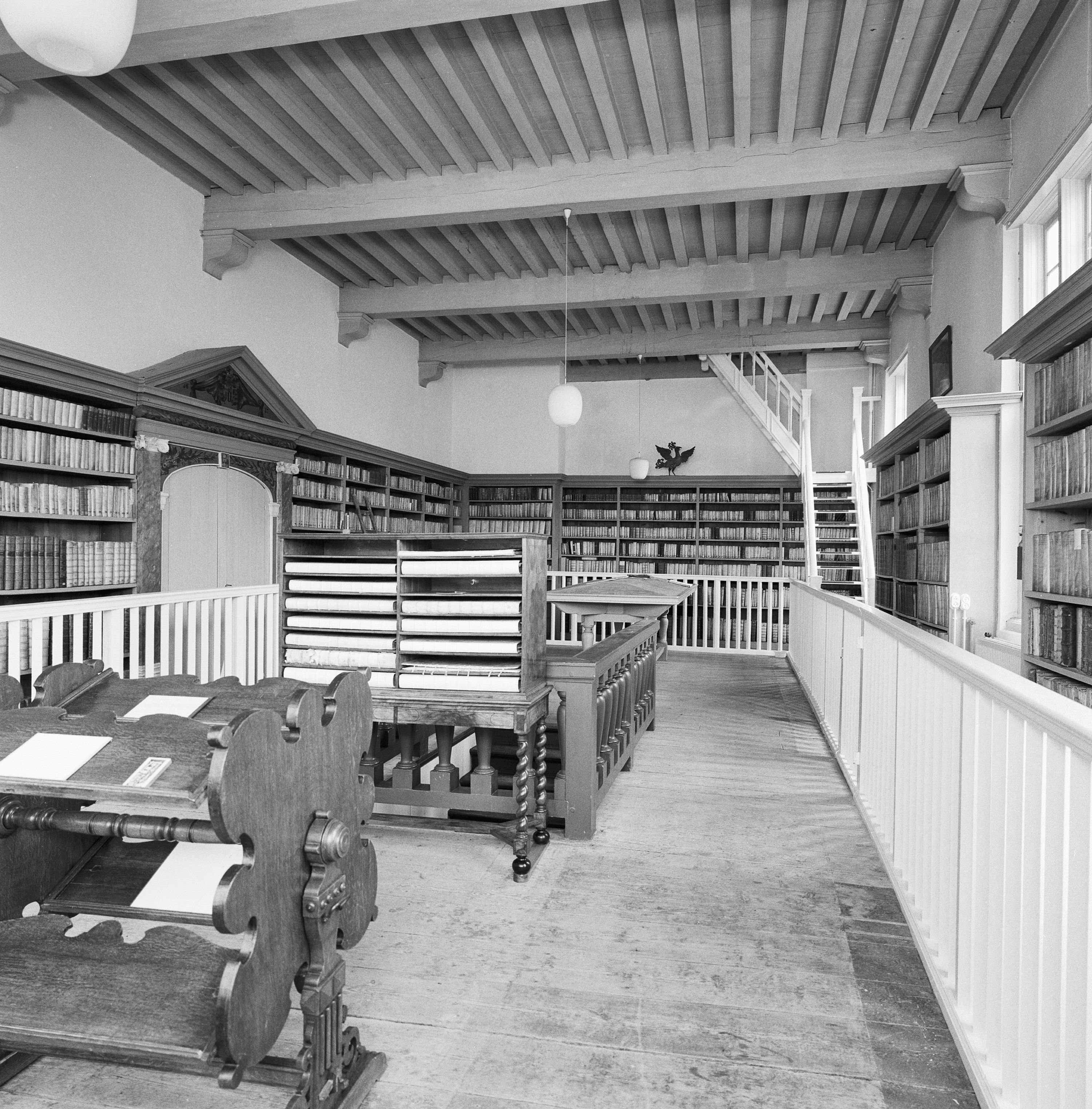
(1994)

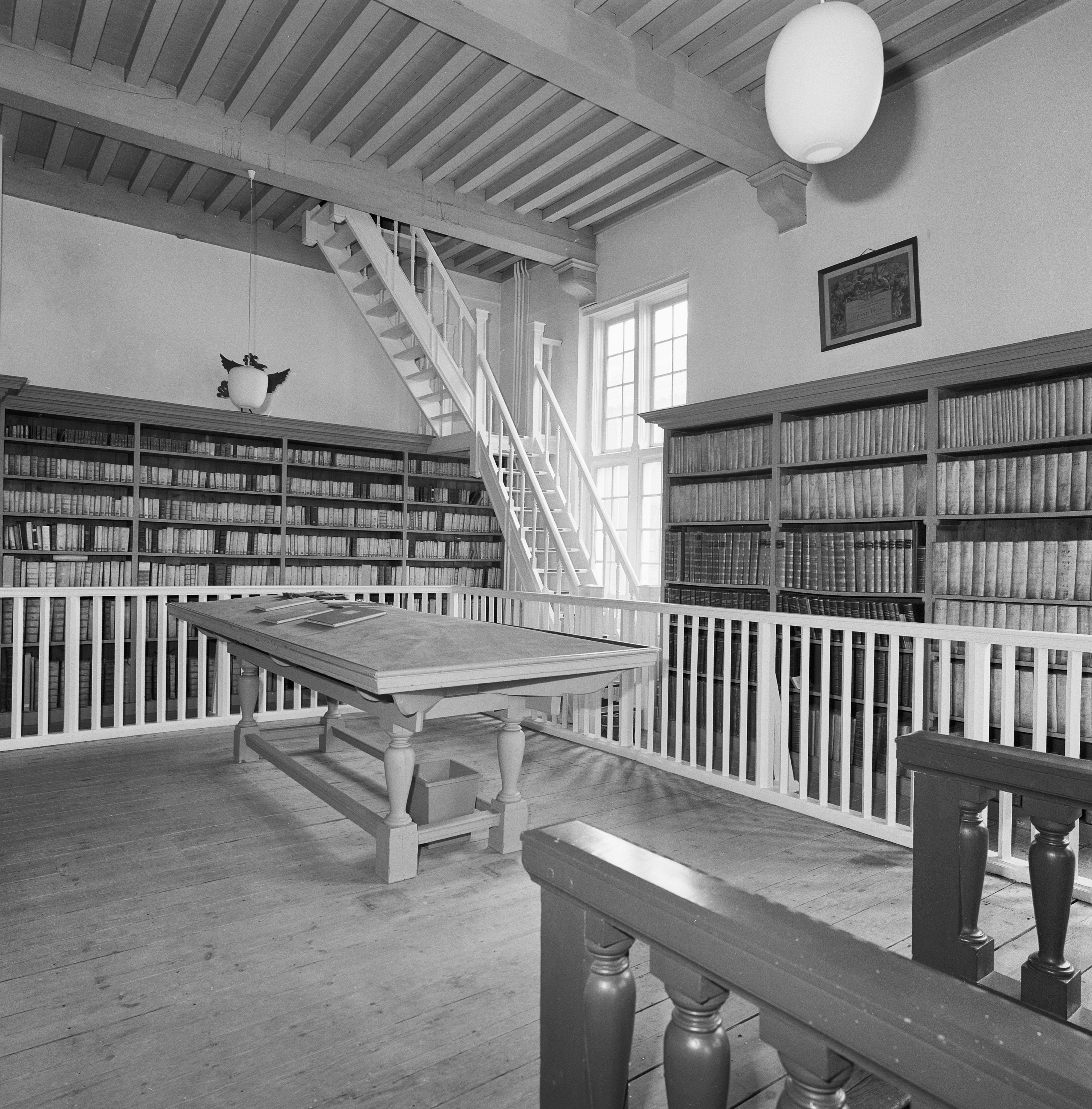
(1994)

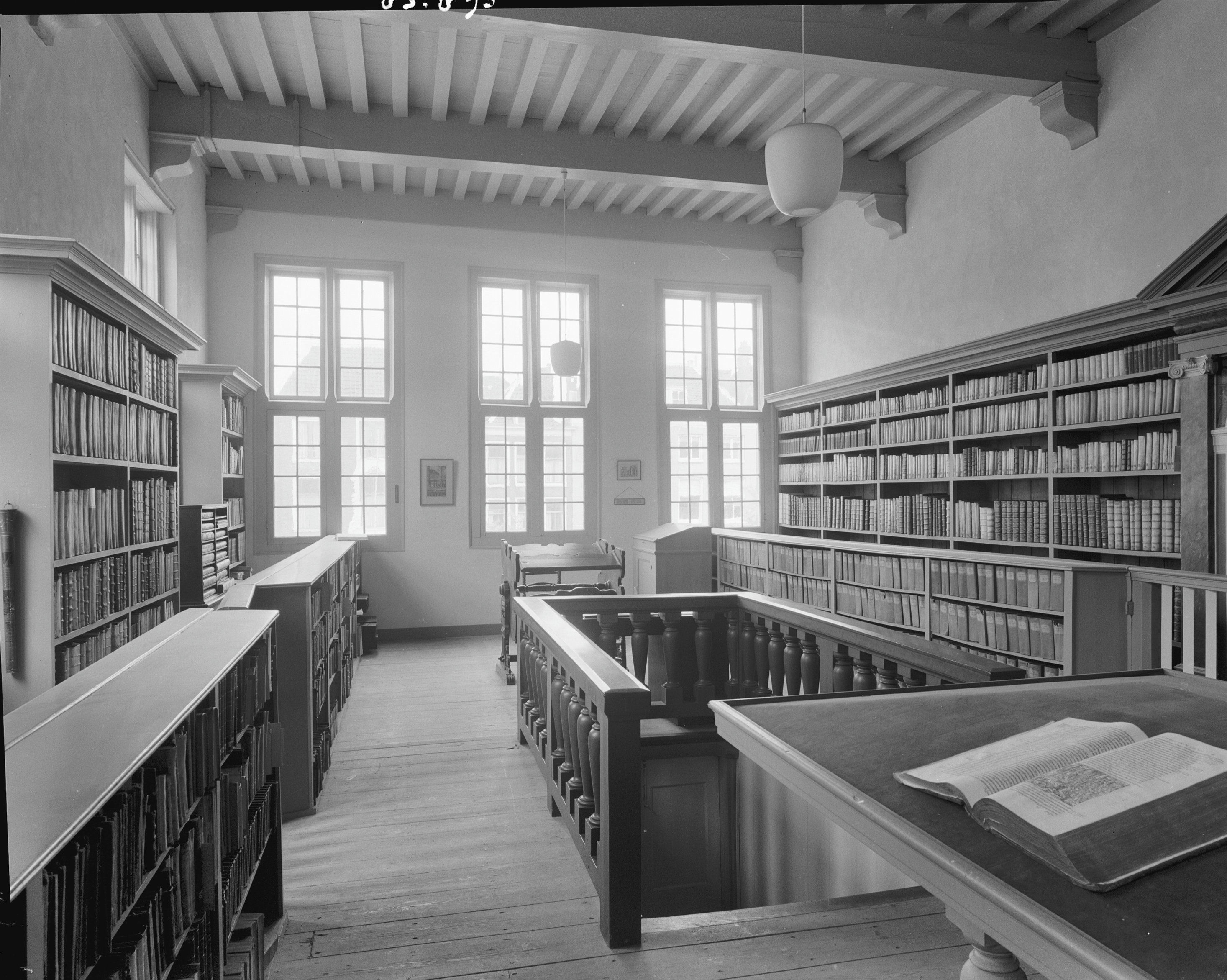
(1964)

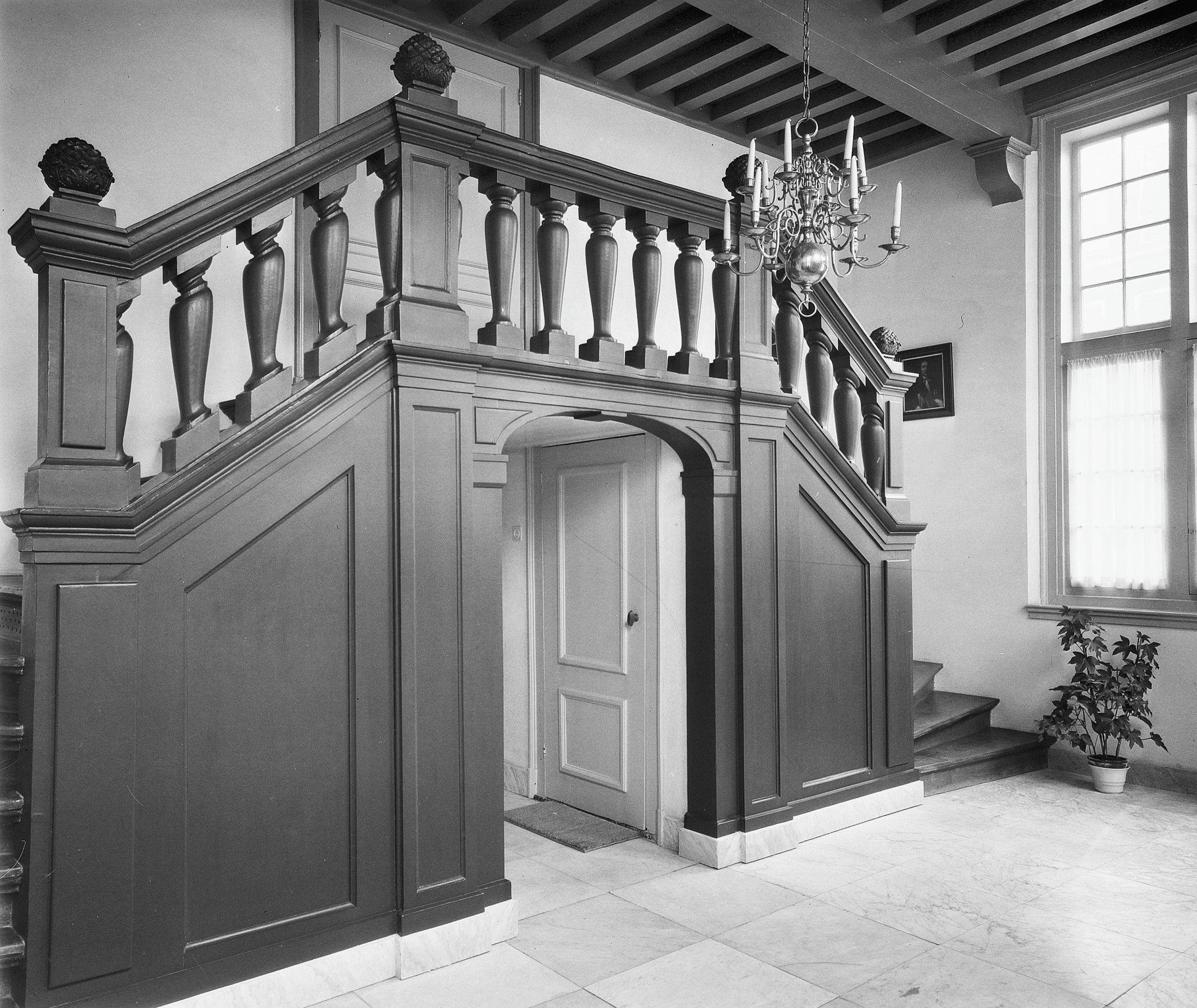
(1959)

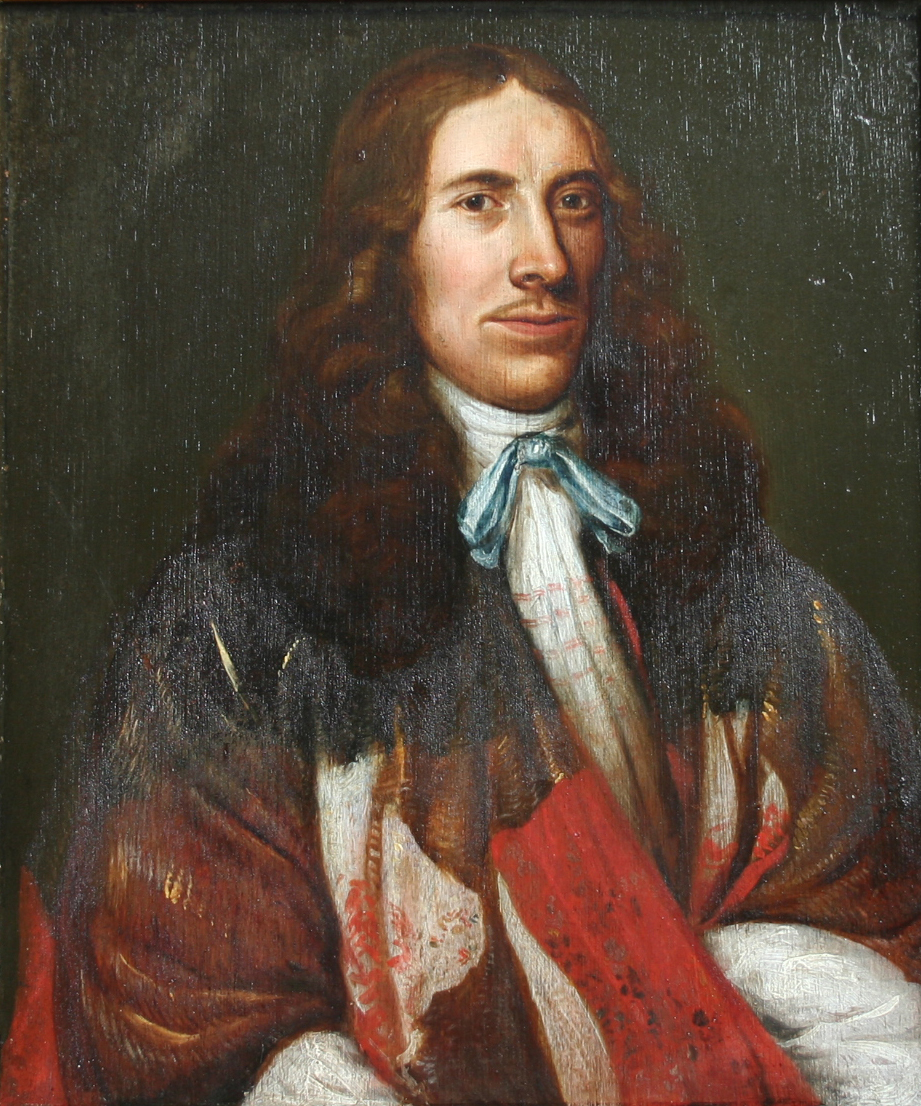
Johannes Thysius

== Publications (selection) ==
- (in English) Adriaan Smout: The Thysius Lute Book / Het Luitboek van Thysius. Facs. ed. (ms. 1666). Leiden & Utrecht, 2009. ISBN 9789065520555
- (in Dutch) Paul Hoftijzer: Bibliotheca Thysiana. 'Tot publijcke dienst der studie' . Leiden, 2008
- (in French) Esther Mourits: Fortune - Du Bartas dans la Bibliotheca Thysiana à Leyde. In: Oeuvres & critiques; vol. 29 (2004), no. 2, pag. 78-86
- (in Dutch) D'avoir une chambre garnie de plus belles editions. Uit de correspondenties van Johannes Thysius. [Ed.: Esther Mourits & G.H.M. Posthumus Meyjes]. Leiden, Bibliotheca Thysiana, 2001.
