= Johannes Thysius =

17th century lawyer and collector from the Netherlands

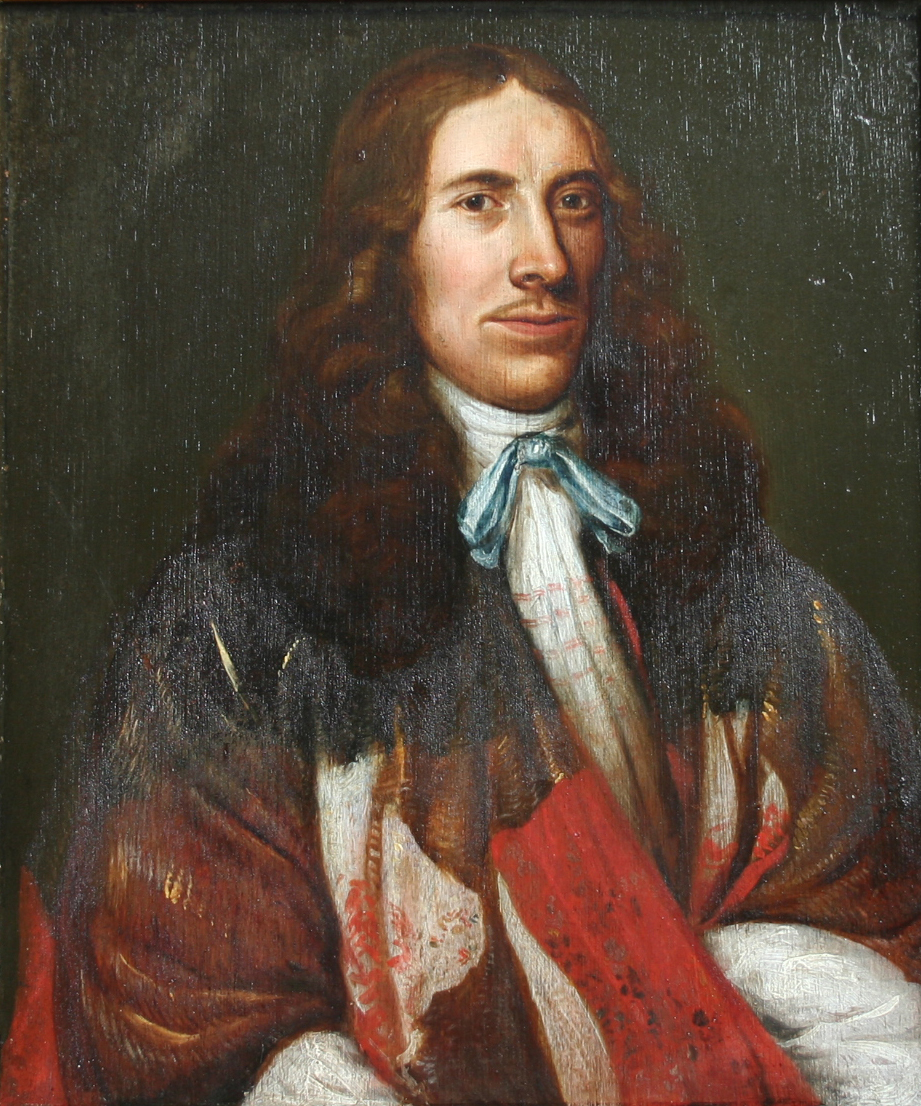
Johannes Thysius Portrait

Johannes Thysius (born Jan Thijs; 1622–1653) was a lawyer, known for his collection of books and prints, now Bibliotheca Thysiana (Leiden). He was the son of an Amsterdam merchant and descendant in a line of goldsmiths, and was raised by Constantinus l’Empereur van Opwijck (1591–1648), professor of Eastern languages at Leiden University. His collection comprised approximately 2,000 books by the time of his death, covering various topics such as history, classics and mathematics. The prints he possessed are mostly secular, featuring reproductions of animals and ornaments as well as humorous and erotic compositions. In addition, the Thysiana collection included the “Thysiana scrapbook”, an album of silhouetted prints and paintings from several sources, most of them being impressions of popular published images, which may or may not have been compiled by him.
