= Supralibros =

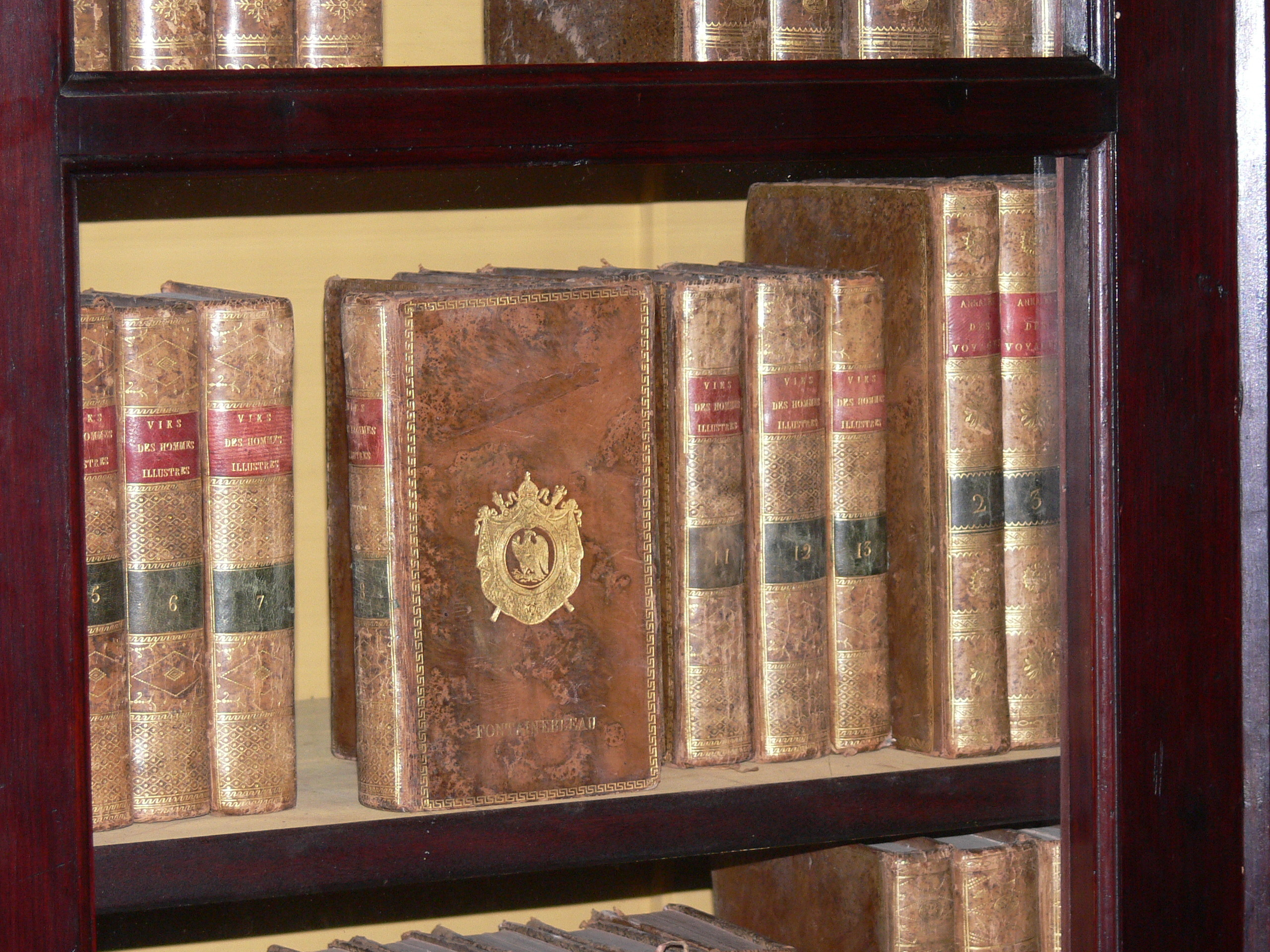
Books from Napoleon Bonaparte's library with his supralibros

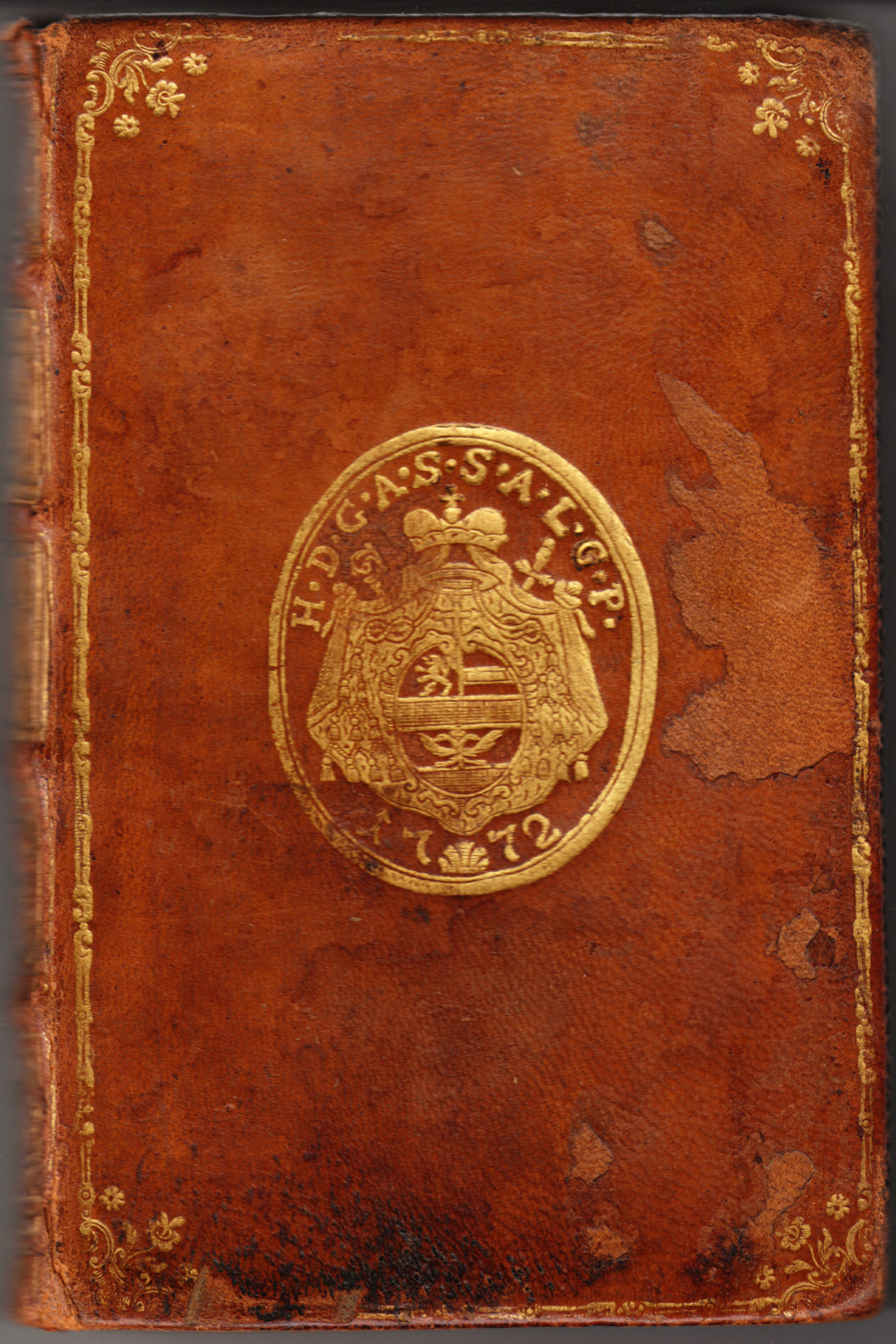
Supralibros showing the coat of arms of Count Hieronymus von Colloredo, archbishop of Salzburg (1772) on an education book

A supralibros (from Latin supra = on and libros = books in the accusative case) is a coat of arms or monogram indicating the ownership of a book. Unlike the bookplate or ex-libris, which is stamped or pasted inside a book, the supralibros is applied to the book's cover. It is called "superexlibris" by the Library of Congress.

Supralibros (plural is also 'supralibros') usually are gilt or blocked on the upper (front) cover of a book, and sometimes on the rear cover as well. The term is also applied to such a mark on the spine. Just like the ex-libris the supralibros is an expression of pride of the owner of the book; apart from being an owner's mark it is often also an adornment. Supralibros first were used during the Renaissance, when the first large private libraries were formed. Famous bibliophiles used much sought-after supralibros that may make a book valuable, for instance Jean Grolier, a renowned collector.

Another often encountered type of supralibros is the school prize binding, a book that was awarded to an especially gifted pupil, bound in vellum or leather and stamped with the coat of arms of the city or the school that awarded the prize, with a bookplate giving the name of the pupil, dated and signed by the headmaster and other officials.

After the 18th century the supralibros went into decline, although full leather school prize bindings with a supralibros continued to be used well into the 20th century. Blackwell's, a large booksellers in Oxford, will bind books and apply the supralibros of the buyer's college for a fee, usually for books bought as prize bindings.
