= Bookwheel =

Rotating bookcase for reading multiple books at once

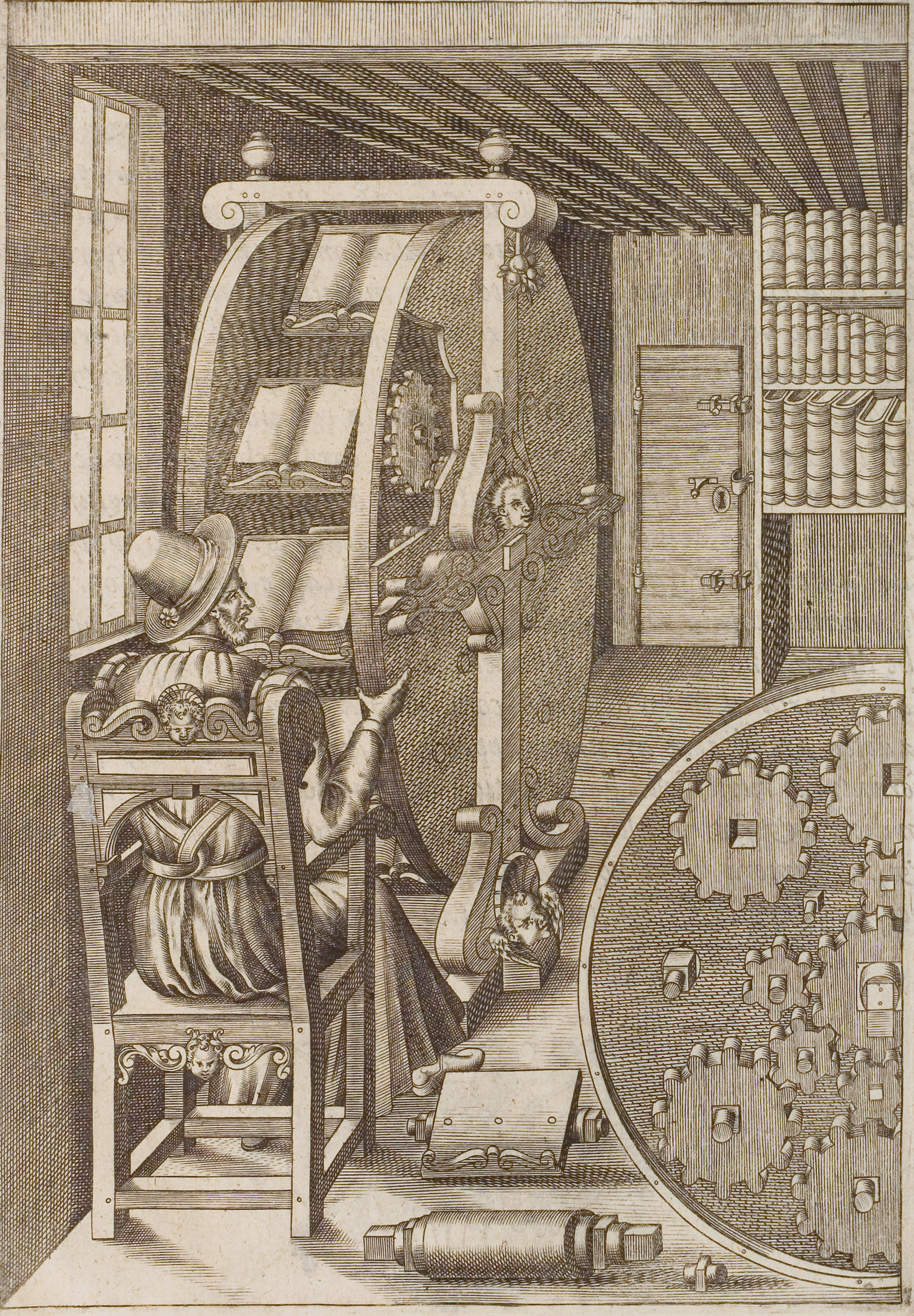
Bookwheel, from Agostino Ramelli's Le diverse et artificiose machine, 1588

The bookwheel (also written book wheel and sometimes called a reading wheel) is a type of rotating bookcase that allows one person to read multiple books in one location with ease. The books are rotated vertically similar to the motion of a water wheel, as opposed to rotating on a flat table surface. The design for the bookwheel originally appeared in a 16th-century illustration by Agostino Ramelli at a time when large books posed practical problems for readers. Ramelli's design influenced other engineers and, though now obsolete, inspires modern artists and historians.

== History and design ==
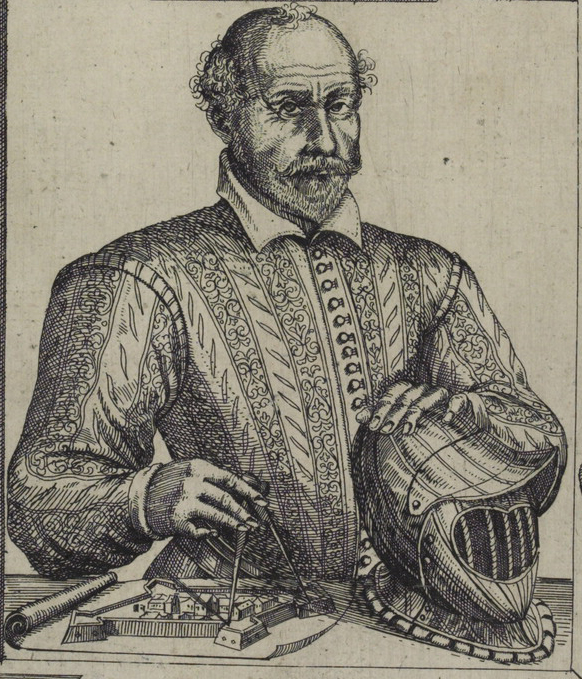
Agostino Ramelli, 1588

The bookwheel, in its most commonly seen form, was invented in 1588 by Italian military engineer Agostino Ramelli, presented as one of the 195 designs in Le diverse et artificiose machine del Capitano Agostino Ramelli (The various and ingenious machines of Captain Agostino Ramelli).

To ensure the books remained at a consistent angle, Ramelli incorporated an epicyclic gearing arrangement, a complex device that had only previously been used in astronomical clocks. As the large wheel rotates, each shelf counter-rotates at the same rate, remaining level.

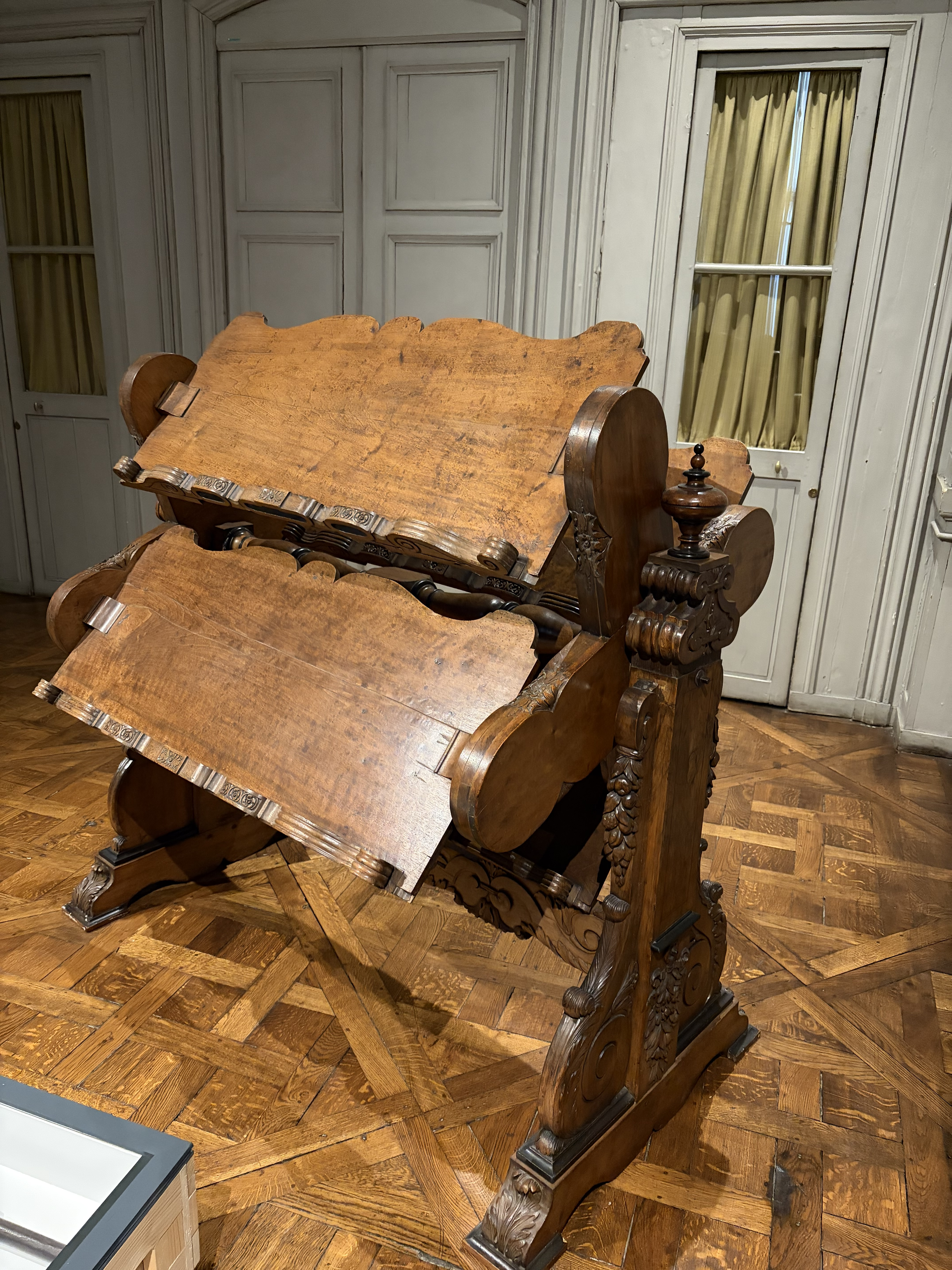
18th-century bookwheel at the Bibliothèque de l'Arsenal, Paris.

Ramelli's design is unnecessarily elaborate, as he likely understood that gravity would also have been effective (as it is with a Ferris wheel, invented centuries later); but the gearing system allowed Ramelli to display his mathematical prowess. While other people would go on to build bookwheels based on Ramelli's design, Ramelli did not in fact ever construct his own.

To what extent bookwheels were appreciated for their convenience versus their aesthetic qualities remains a matter of speculation according to American engineer Henry Petroski. Ramelli himself described the bookwheel as a "beautiful and ingenious machine, very useful and convenient for anybody who takes pleasure in study, especially for those who are indisposed and tormented by gout." Ramelli's reference to gout, a condition that impairs mobility, demonstrates the appeal of a device that allows access to several books while the reader is seated. However, Petroski notes that Ramelli's illustration lacks space for writing and other scholarly work, and that the "fanciful wheel" may not have been appropriate for any activity beyond reading.

While the design of the bookwheel is commonly credited to Ramelli, some historians dispute that he was the first to invent such a device. Joseph Needham, a historian of Chinese technology, stated that revolving bookcases (zhuanlunzang; Chinese: 轉輪藏; pinyin: zhuàn lún zàng), though not vertically oriented, originated in China "perhaps a thousand years before Ramelli's design was taken there."

== Legacy ==
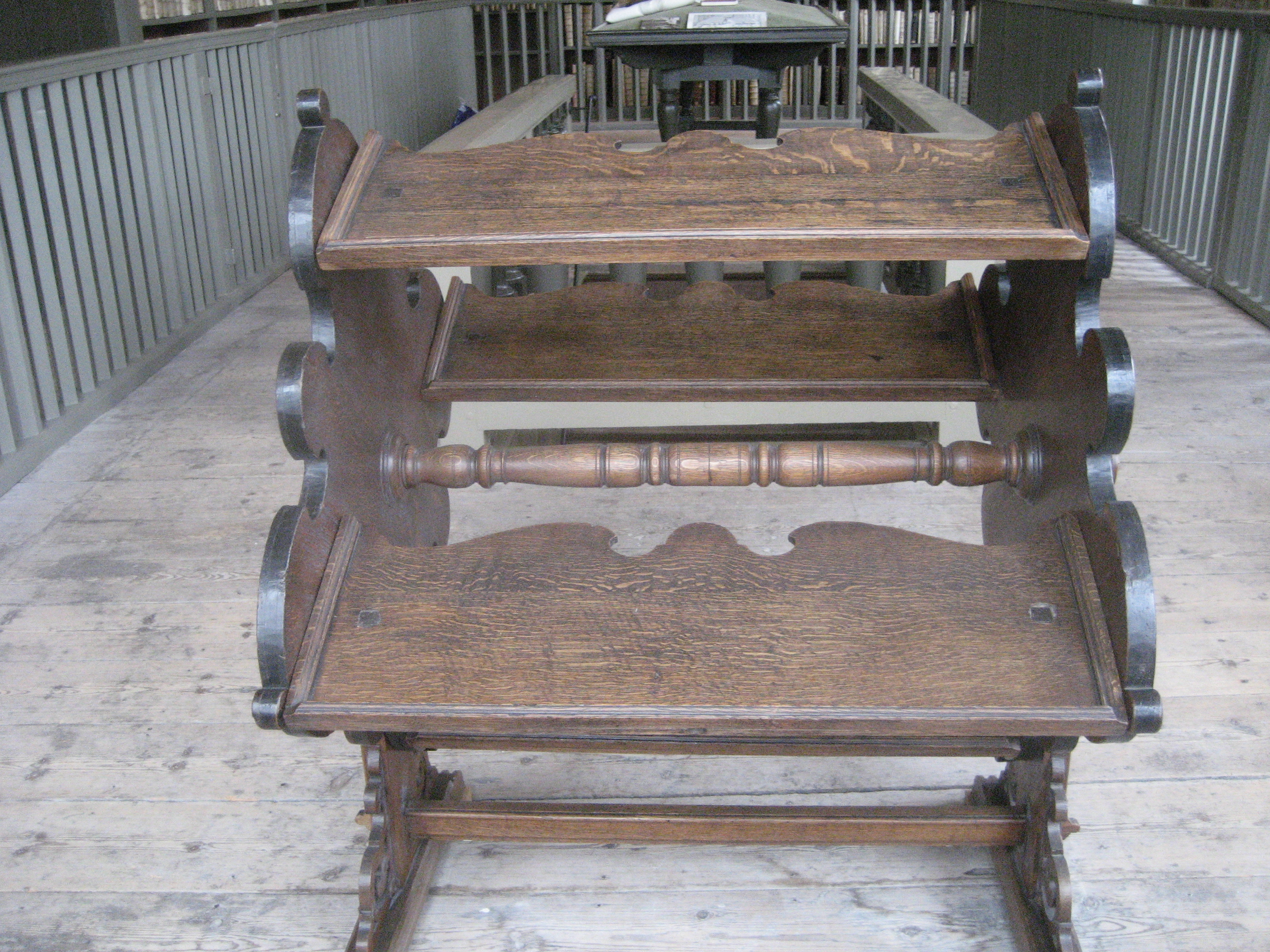
Bookwheel in Leiden (c.1650)

The bookwheel was an early attempt to solve the problem of managing increasingly numerous printed works, which were typically large and heavy in Ramelli's time. It has been called one of the earliest "information retrieval" devices and has been considered a precursor to modern technologies, such as hypertext and e-readers, that allow readers to store and cross-reference large amounts of information. Other inventors, such as French inventor Nicolas Grollier de Servière (1596–1689), proposed their own variations on Ramelli's design.

Of the dozens of bookwheels built in the 17th and 18th centuries, 14 are known to survive: in Ghent, Hamburg, Klosterneuburg, Cracow, Lambach, Leiden, Naples (2), Paris, Prague (2), Puebla City, Wernigerode and in Wolfenbüttel.

In contemporary times, the bookwheel is valued for its historical importance, decorative appeal, and symbolic significance. Ramelli's design has been recreated by artists such as Daniel Libeskind, and it inspired the name of the Smithsonian Library's blog "Turning the Book Wheel".

== Modern reproductions ==
A group of undergraduate engineering students at the Rochester Institute of Technology (RIT) constructed two bookwheels in 2018 based on Ramelli's design, but using modern tools and processes. Built from historically accurate materials such as European beech and white oak wood, each bookwheel weighs 600 pounds and can hold eight books. The bookwheels are on display at two libraries in Rochester, New York: the Cary Graphic Arts Collection at RIT and Rossell Hope Robbins Library at the University of Rochester.

Another modern reproduction was built by the Bibliothèque de l'Arsenal in Paris, based on their model, to allow people to see how the mechanism is working without causing damage to the original.

Bookwheels

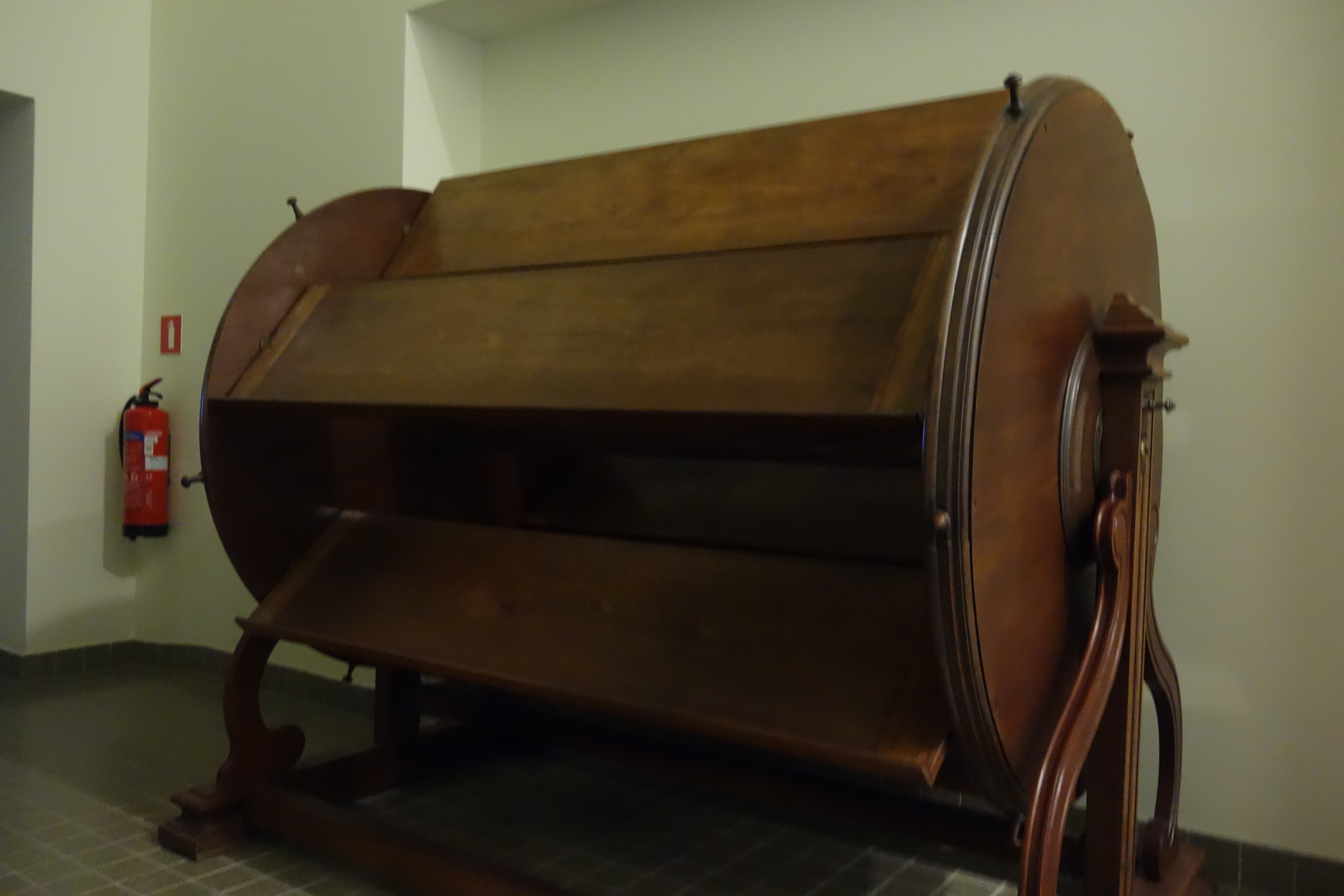
Ghent

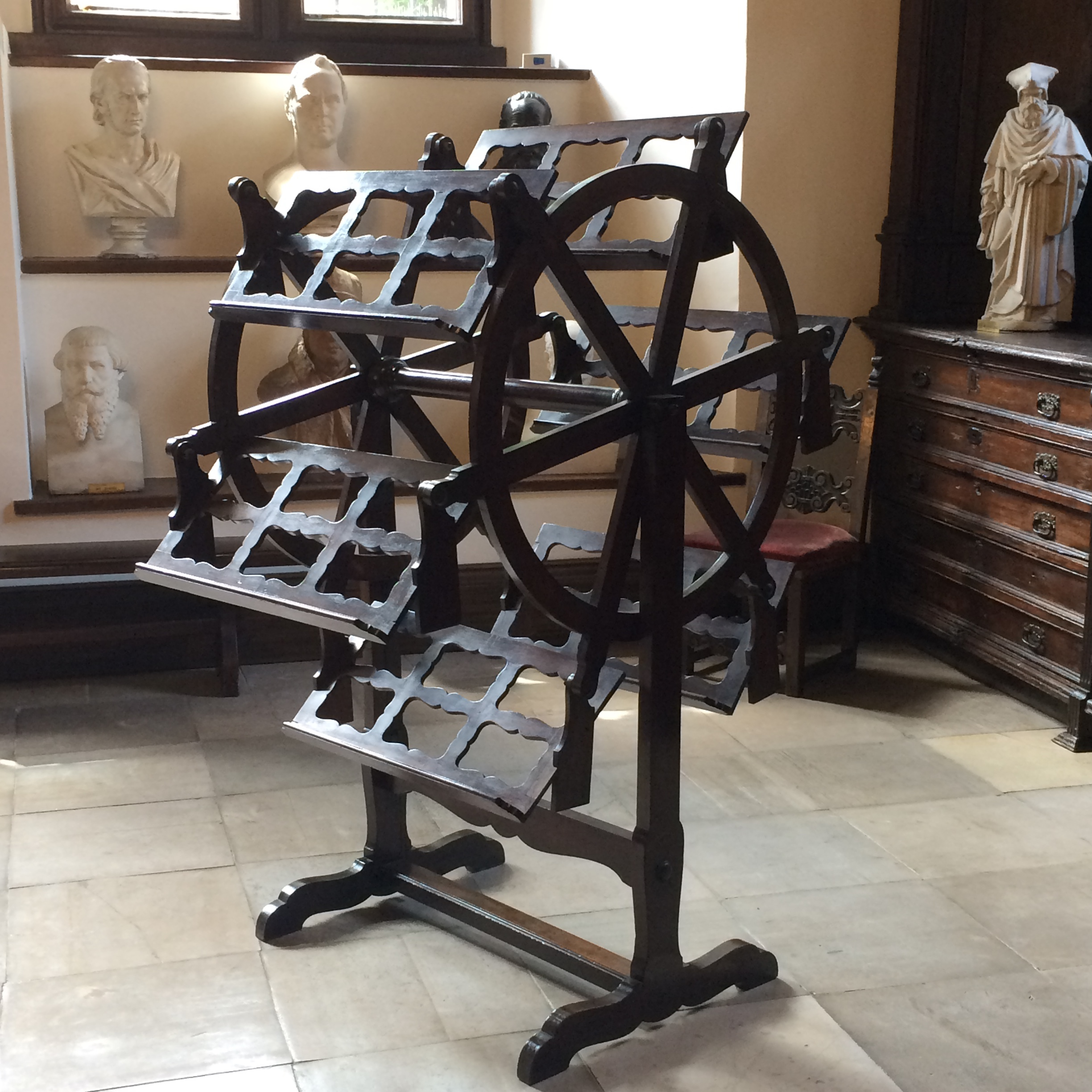
Krakow

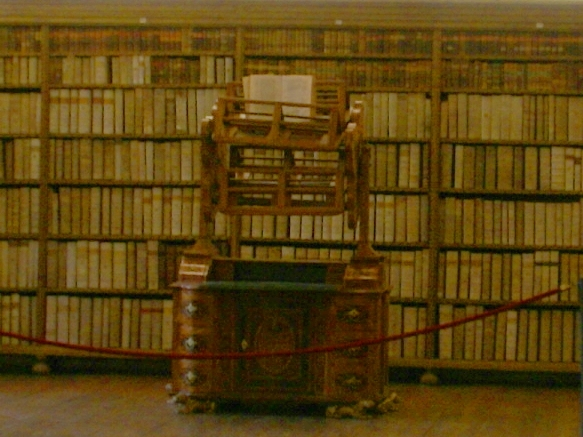
Lambach

Prague

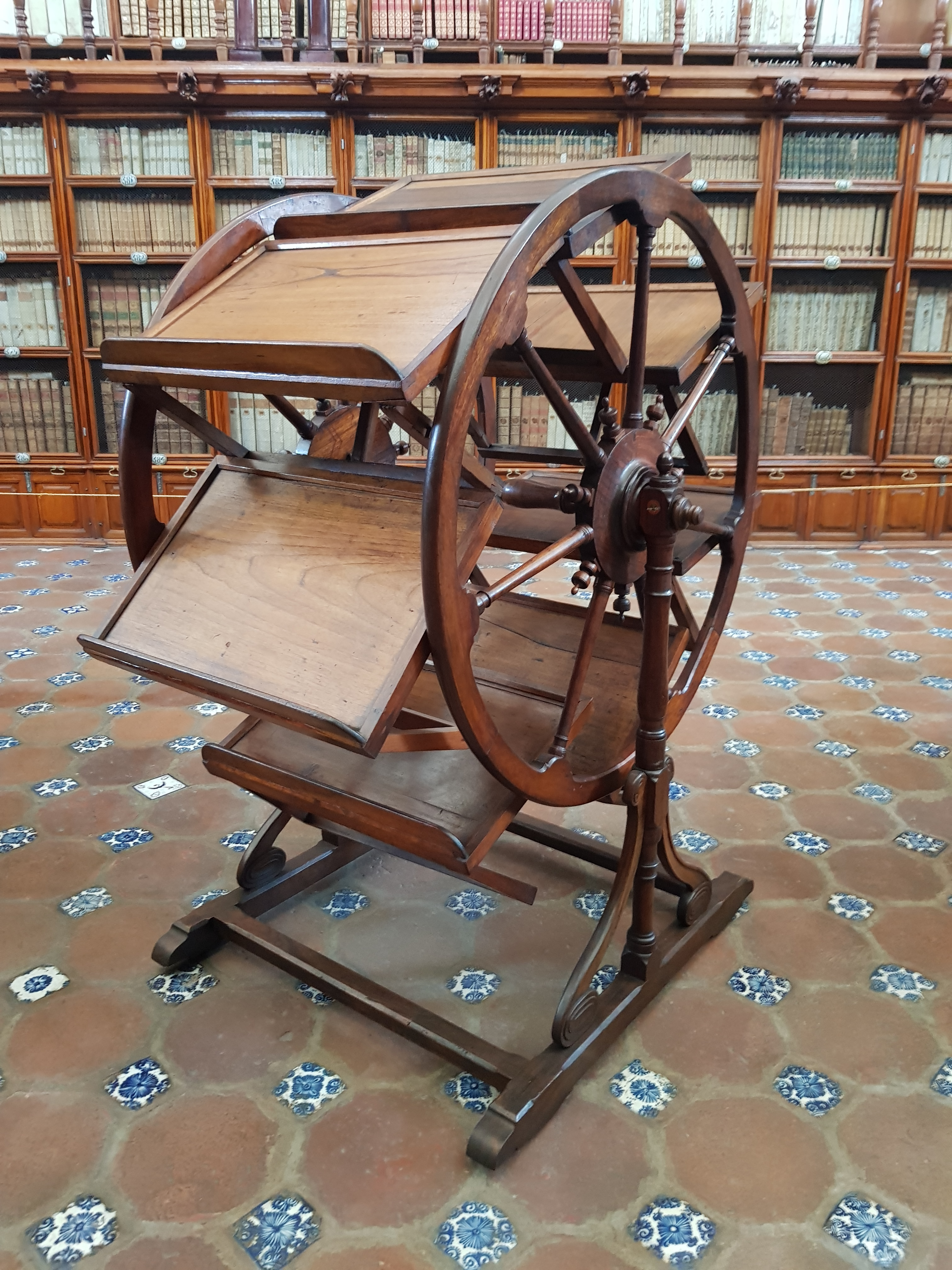
Puebla

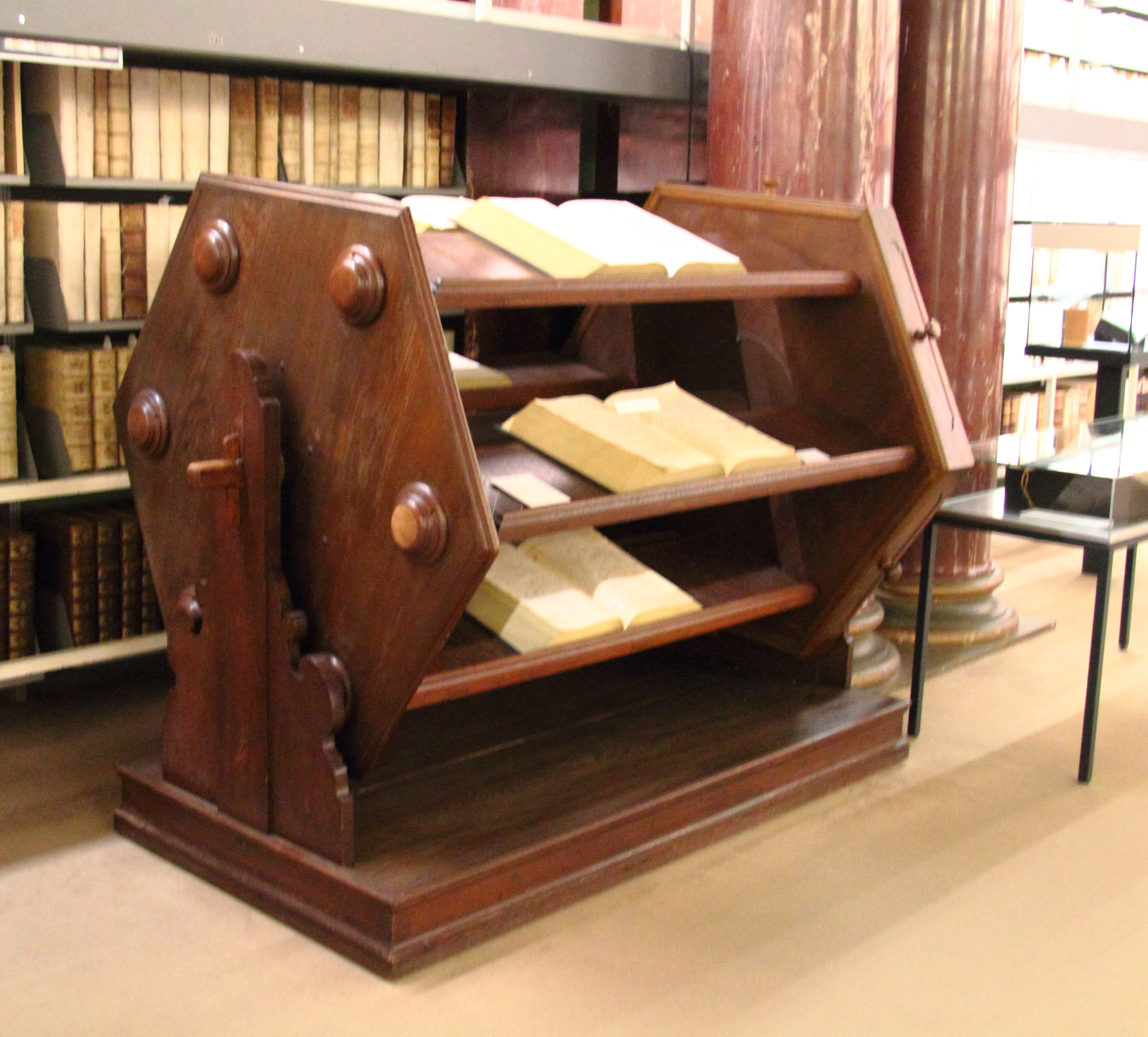
Wolfenbüttel

== Publications (selection) ==
- John Considine: 'The Ramellian Bookwheel'. In: Erudition and the Republic of Letters, 2016, 1: 4, 381–411
- E. Hanebutt-Benz: Die Kunst des Lesens. Lesemöbel und Leseverhalten vom Mittelalter bis zur Gegenwart. Frankfurt a. M., Museum für Kunsthandwerk, 1985. ISBN 3-88270-026-2
- M. Boghardt: 'Das Wolfenbuetteler Bücherrad'. In: Museum, April 1978, 58–60.
- Martha Teach Gnudi & Eugene S. Ferguson: Ramelli's ingenious machines. The various and ingenious machines of Agostino Ramelli (1588). Baltimore, Johns Hopkins University Press, 1976. ISBN 0-85967-247-6 (Repr. 1987 & 1994)
- Bert S. Hall: 'A revolving bookcase by Agostino Ramelli'. In: Technology and culture, 11 (1970), 389–400.
- M. von Katte: 'Herzog August und die Kataloge seiner Bibliothek In: Wolfenbuetteler Beiträge, 1 (1972), 174–182.
- A.G. Keller: A theatre of machines. London, Chapman and Hall, 1964.
- John Willis Clark: The care of books. An essay on the development of libraries and their fittings, from the earliest times to the end of the eighteenth century. Cambridge, Cambridge University Press, 1901. [Repr. Cambridge 2009: ISBN 9781108005081]
- Agostino Ramelli: Le diverse et artificiose machine. Composte in lingua Italiana et Francese. Paris, 1588 (Repr.: Franborough, Hants, 1970) Google Books
