= Jean Picard (bookbinder) =

French bookbinder

Jean Picard was a French bookbinder, active in the 1540s. Picard, who favoured geometric designs, is notable for having bound many books for the bibliophile Jean Grolier.

While the Grolier bindings have long been sought after, the identities of the binders who made them were forgotten until twentieth-century scholarship threw light on Picard and other binders. The British Library's bindings catalogue attributes a number of bindings to Picard: they are almost all on books bound for Grolier around 1540 in Paris. The Bibliothèque nationale de France has a larger collection. Picard may also have worked at the French royal bindery, which was very active under the patronage of Francis I.

== Picard and the Aldine Press ==
Many of the books which Picard bound for Grolier were "Aldines", the celebrated editions of the classics by the Aldine Press of Venice. The press had been founded in 1494, and after the death of its founder, Aldus Manutius, in 1515, his family continued to run the business.

As well as binding Aldines, Picard appears to have had a more direct connection with the Aldine Press, as a man called Jean Picard was engaged in 1540 by one of the Torresani relatives of Aldus Manutius to manage the Parisian agency of the Press, selling books on commission. Not all sources agree that the bookseller can be assumed to be the same person as the bookbinder, although the possibility that he was the same person is obvious.

The bookshop, identified by the sign of the dolphin and anchor (the emblem of the Aldine Press), occupied premises in the Rue Saint-Jacques. This street in the Latin Quarter was a centre of the book trade. France was an important market for the classics, although the Aldine Press faced competition there from pirated editions. In 1547 Picard encountered financial problems and fled his creditors. The Aldine Press then appointed a printer called Le Riche as its new agent. Le Riche was replaced after a couple of years by the bookbinder Gomar Estienne, who had been working at the royal bindery, the so-called Atelier de Fontainebleau. Estienne appears to have acquired some of the bookbinding tools used by Picard.

== Picard designs ==
Picard is associated with a decorative style for which the French term is entrelacs géométriques. This style, which was favoured by Grolier, has interlaced designs which can be described as strapwork or interlaced ribbons. He also worked in other styles.
