= Étienne Roffet =

French bookbinder

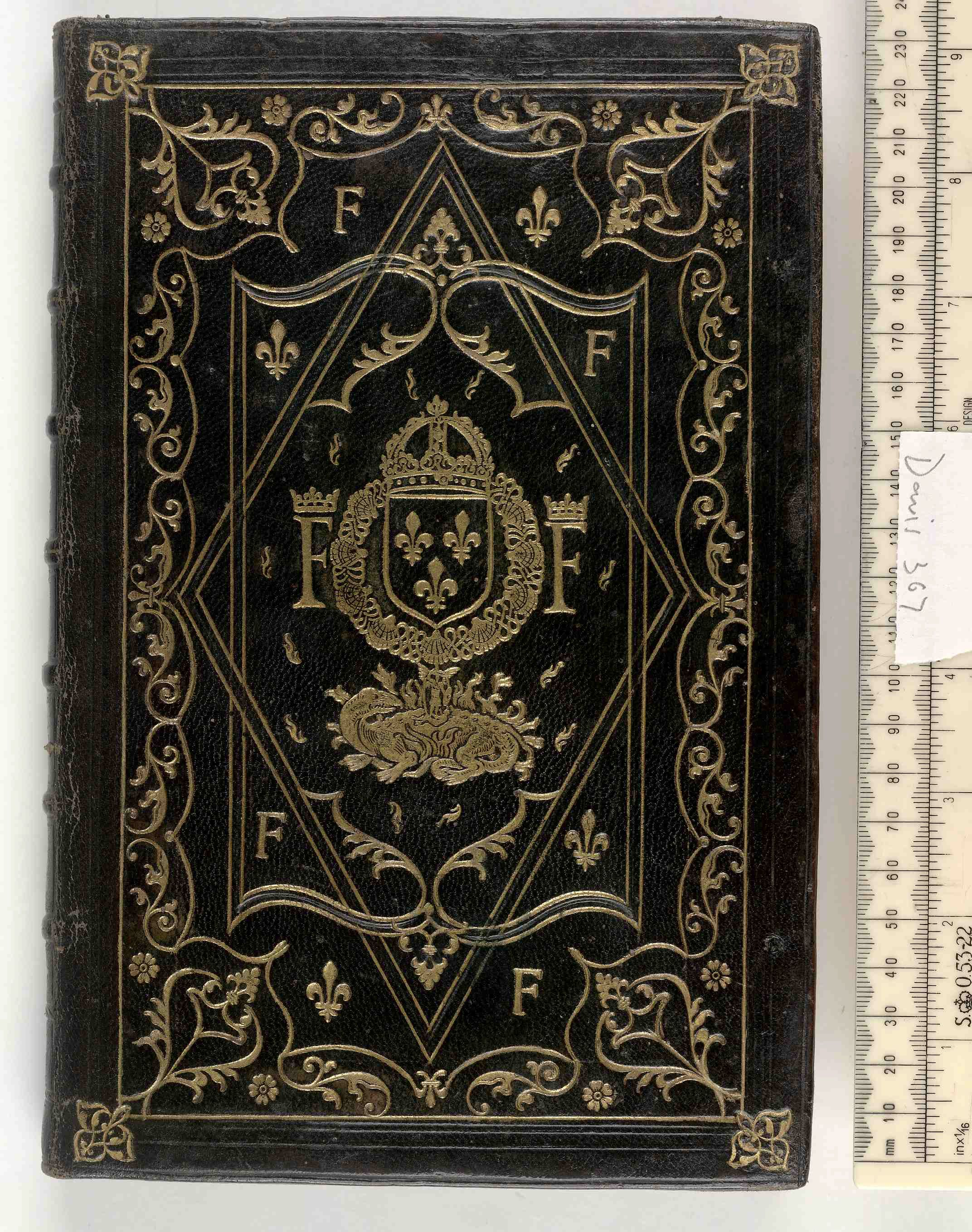
Bookbinding by Étienne Roffet in the British Library

Étienne Roffet, also known as Le Faucheur (died before July 1549), was a French bookbinder.

Étienne Roffet was born into the trade; his father, Pierre Roffet, was also a bookbinder and book trader. Étienne Roffet was active from at least 1533 until his death sometime between November 1548 and July 1549. He was the first bookbinder in France to hold the title of royal bookbinder (relieur du roi) and was from the early 1530s binder of books for the personal library of King Francis I. From 1545 he was head of the so-called Fontainebleau workshop at the Palace of Fontainebleau that produced bindings for the royal library. After his death he was succeeded in this post by Gomar Estienne.
