= Agostino Ramelli =

Italian engineer

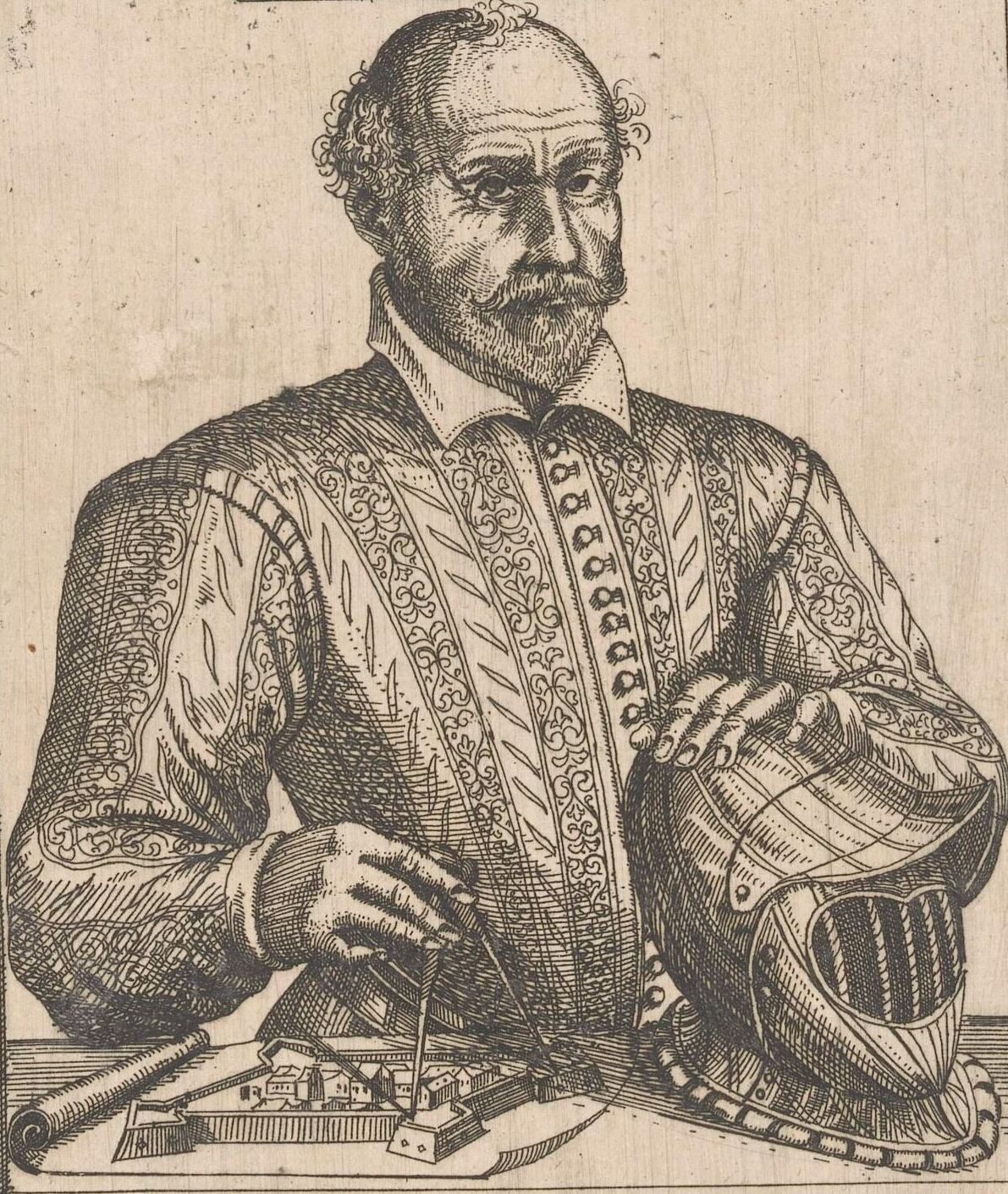
Agostino Ramelli

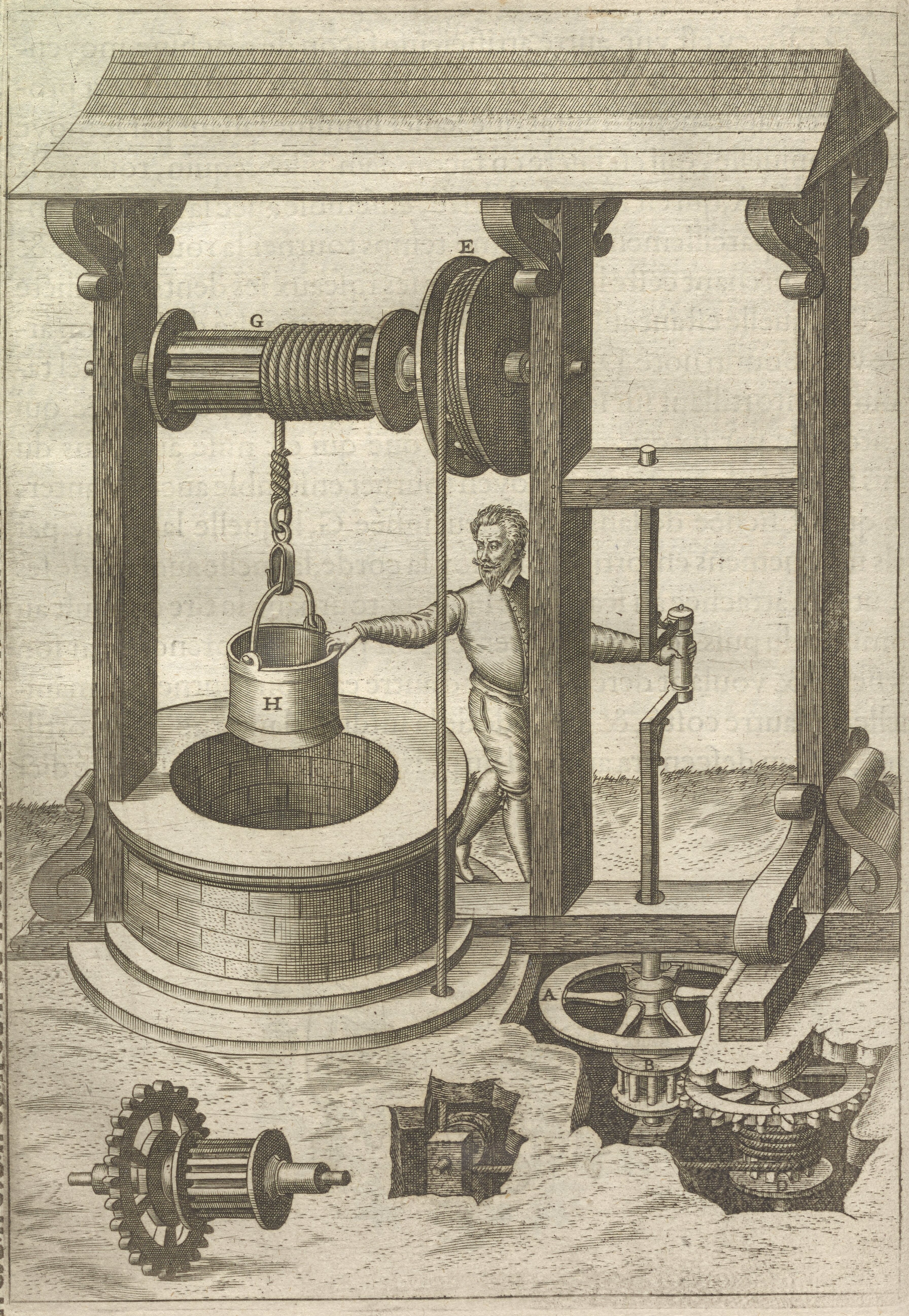
Description of a windlass well by Agostino Ramelli, 1588

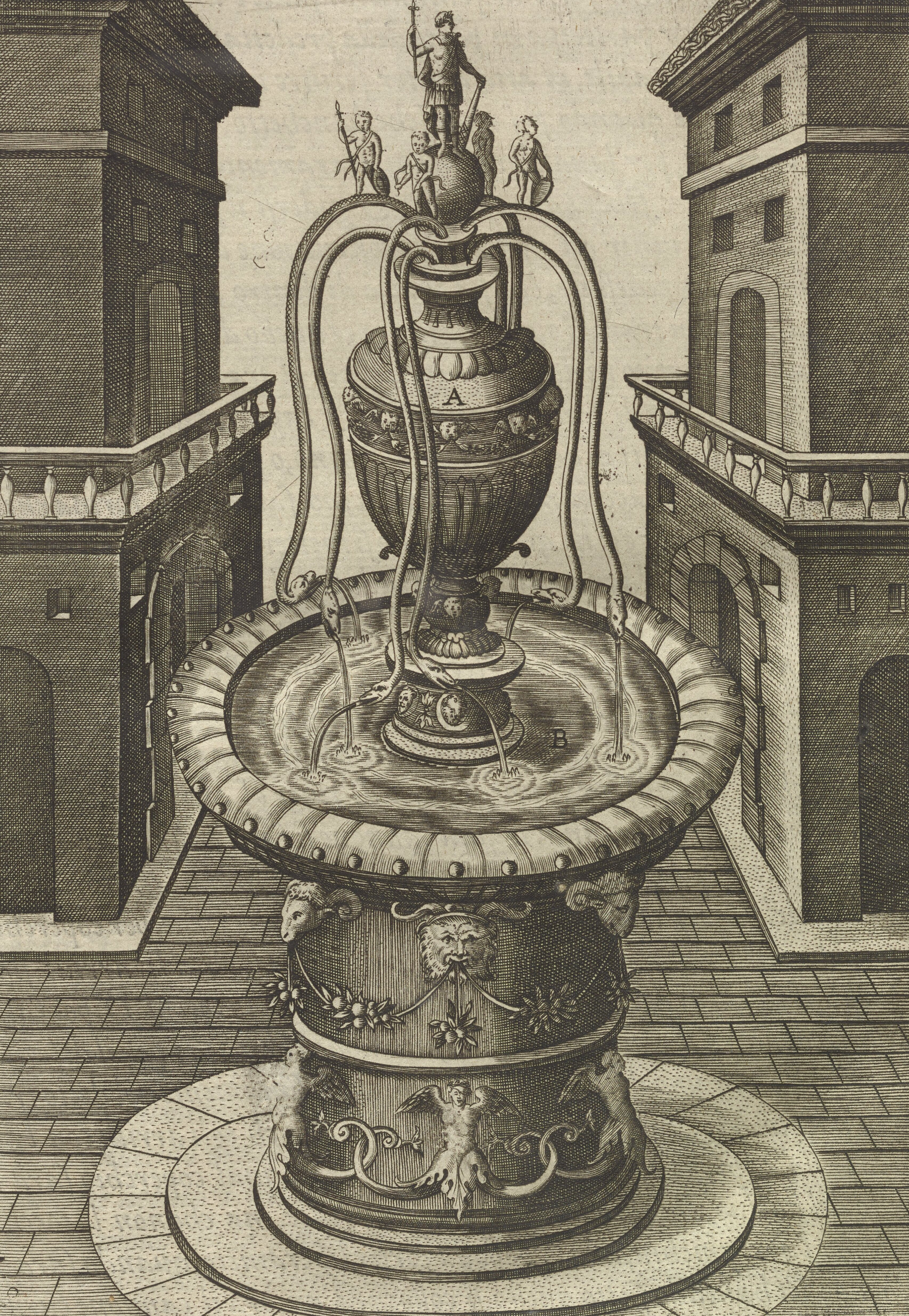
Description of a fountain by Agostino Ramelli, 1588

Agostino Ramelli (1531–ca. 1610) was an Italian engineer best known for writing and illustrating the book of engineering designs Le diverse et artificiose machine del Capitano Agostino Ramelli, which contains, among others, his design for the bookwheel.

== Biography ==
Ramelli was born in Ponte Tresa or Mesanzena, today in Switzerland. During the Siege of La Rochelle (1572–1573), he successfully engineered a mine under a bastion and breached the fortification, making him popular with his commander, Henri d'Anjou, who later became King Henri III of France. In 1588, Ramelli published Le diverse et artificiose machine del Capitano Agostino Ramelli, or The various and ingenious machines of Captain Agostino Ramelli. The book contains 195 designs, over 100 of which are water-raising machines, such as water pumps or wells. Other designs include bridges, mills, and a possible forerunner to the Wankel engine. Some of his pump mechanisms feature early rotary and multi-piston concepts that conceptually resemble modern axial piston pumps (for example, those used today in car air conditioning compressors). The bookwheel is one of the most famous designs from this book. Le diverse et artificiose machine is still printed and sold.
