= Jean Grolier de Servières =

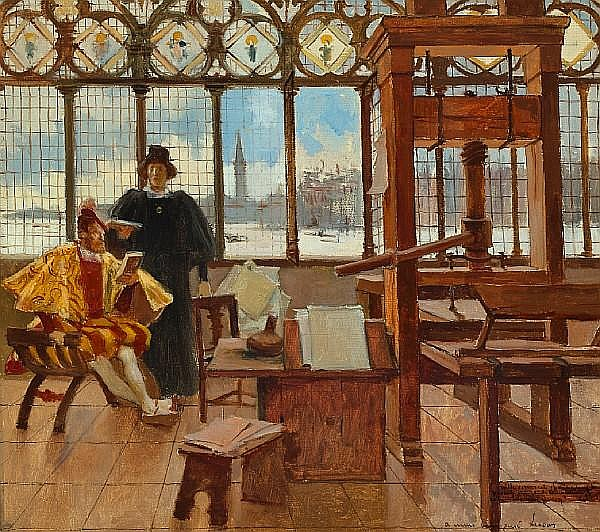
Victorian painting by François Flameng, of Grolier (seated) with Aldus Manutius

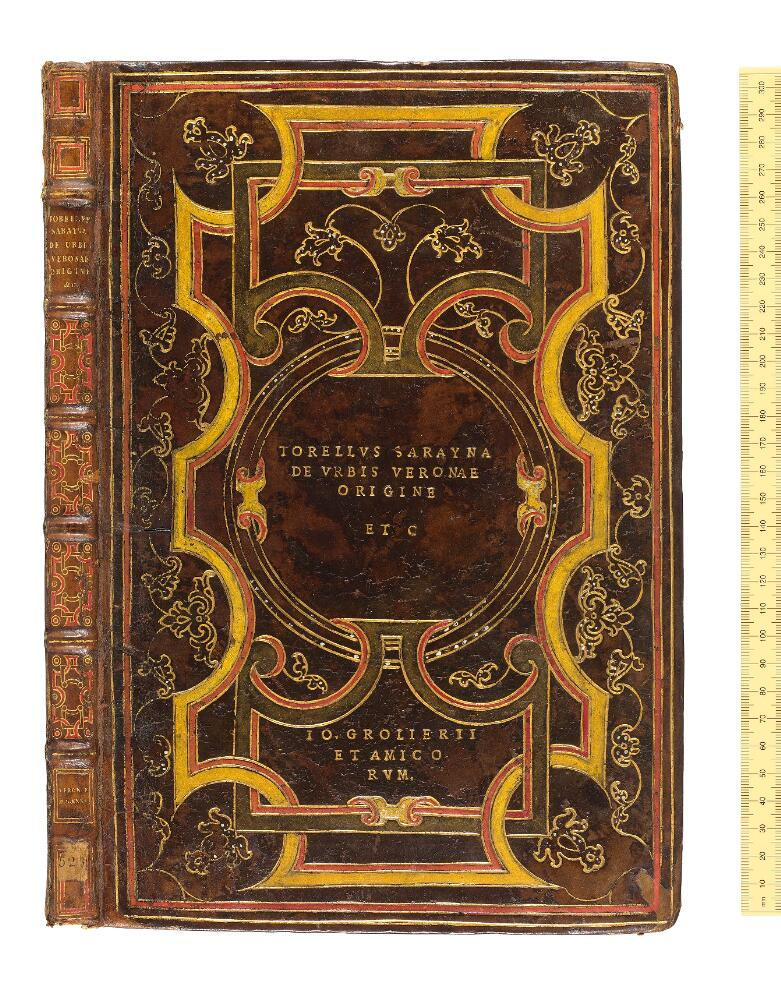
Bookbinding showing Grolier's supralibros Io. Grolieri et Amicorum

Jean Grolier de Servières, viscount d'Aguisy (c. 1489/90 – 22 October 1565) was Treasurer-General of France and a famous bibliophile. As a book collector, Grolier is known in particular for his patronage of the Aldine Press, and his love of richly decorated bookbindings.

== Biography ==
Grolier was born in Lyon; he encouraged the belief that he was older than seems plausible given the marriage of his parents in 1485, resulting in 1479 often being given as his date of birth. Based on recently discovered documentary evidence from July 1527, when he gave his age as 37 in legal proceedings, he is now regarded as born in 1489-90. His family was of Italian origin, from Verona, but was based in Lyon where Étienne Grolier, Grolier's father, was a wealthy merchant who also held a government post as a tax collector. His mother was Antonia Esbauda; there were four daughters of the marriage, but Jean was their only son. In 1506 Étienne obtained, probably by purchase, the post of Treasurer-General of Milan, then held by the French. Jean Grolier was to inherit this office at the age of 19 or 20 on his father's death in Milan in 1509. Grolier still owned the family house in Lyons in 1536, though he had not lived there as an adult.

In 1508 Jean Grolier was a secrétaire du roi ("secretary to the king" - a junior aide in today's terminology) who had to accompany Louis XII and his court around France. His studies continued under the Renaissance humanist Gaspar Argilensis (or Gaspar d'Argile), who dedicated his edition of Suetonius to Grolier (Lyons 1508). Grolier was in Milan as treasurer from 1509 (at least) until the French were expelled in June 1512, and then returned with the French army, now under François I, in 1515 and remained until they were again thrown out in 1521, after the disaster of the Battle of Pavia, when he returned to France.

In his second period in Milan he was at the centre of a humanistic literary circle, and met Aldus Manutius, printer of so many of his books, when he visited from Venice, probably in 1511. There is no evidence Grolier went to Venice, as is sometimes claimed. Many works were dedicated to him, and several letters to and from his circle survive, including ones from Erasmus.

Grolier later represented the French monarchy in Italy, though claims in older works that he had a formal appointment as ambassador to the Papacy are mistaken. He was Treasurer of War from 1522–31, and after holding regional positions as treasurer he was made one of four Treasurers-General of France in 1537. He had married Anne Briçonnet, from a Tours family, who died in 1545 or so, and they had two daughters at least. He died on 22 October 1565 in Paris and was buried in the Abbey of Saint-Germain-des-Prés, the funeral arranged and the tomb paid for by two daughters and two grandsons.

== Book collection ==
Grolier's books bore the inscription, Io. Grolieri et Amicorum (Latin for "the property of Jean Grolier and his friends"), early examples adding Lugdunensis ("of Lyon") after his name. There is some debate about how he shared books with his friends, but there is evidence that his generosity in lending to friends resulted in some items going missing, and the library was largely dispersed long before 1675, a date given in older sources. A work of 1620 already claimed that "the finest libraries both in Paris and elsewhere in France owe their adornment solely to Grolier's copies".

Grolier was particularly interested in the Latin classics, and his books were bound in different coloured leather according to subject matter. His first period in Italy already shows him taking an innovative interest in bookbinding, commissioning a series of "plaquette bindings" with large medal-like reliefs at the centre of the cover. Previously this style had only been used for special presentation volumes, and Grolier was the first collector to apply it systematically to books for his own library, which he seems to have begun to do in 1510. Most of his library was bound in France, but the designs continued to show Italian influence. Grolier gave his name to a style of bookbinding ornamented with geometric patterns, exemplified in those he commissioned, and perhaps helped to design. Grolier bindings were mostly produced in Paris between 1520 and 1555, and show a development in style: "Simple geometrical strapwork designs with fleurons at the corners of the central panel developed in the later bindings into elaborate curvilinear interlacings combined with arabesques sometimes enclosed in roll-produced borders".

Analysis of the surviving bindings shows that Grolier patronised several workshops over the years. Only a limited amount of information is known about the bookbinders involved. However, some bindings are in an identifiable style (for example, that of "Grolier's last binder"), while documentary evidence allows a few of the binders to identified by name:

- Geoffroy Tory (d. 1533), a Parisian printer and bookbinder best known as a designer of type for printing
- Jean Picard, a Parisian bookbinder and bookseller. Picard was active in the 1540s and, up to 1547, combined his bookbinding with holding the Paris agency of the Aldine Press.

== Gallery of bindings made for Grolier ==
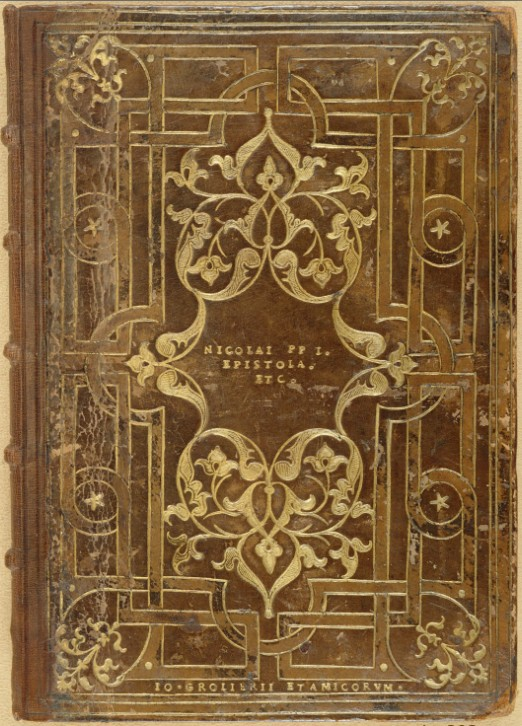

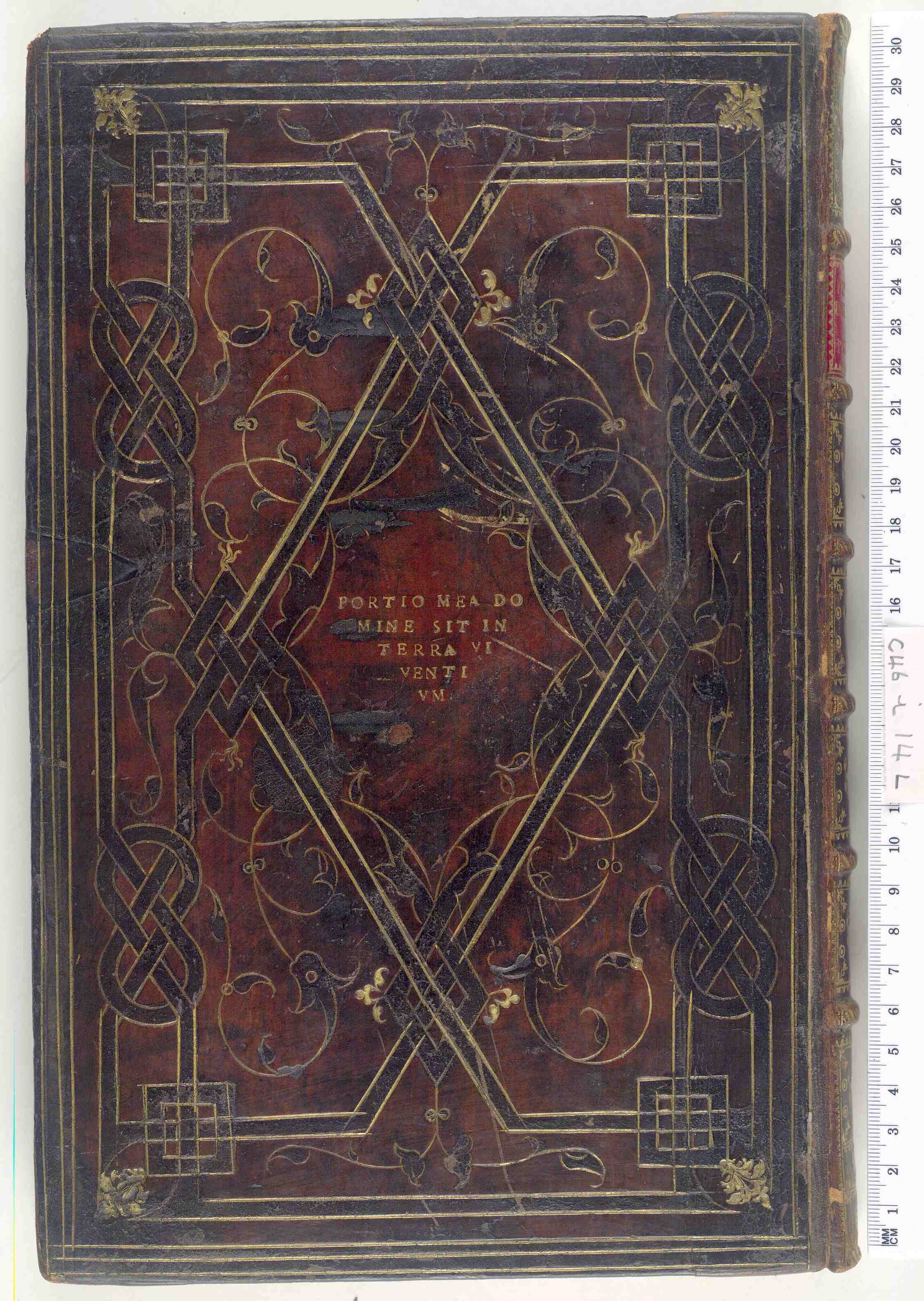

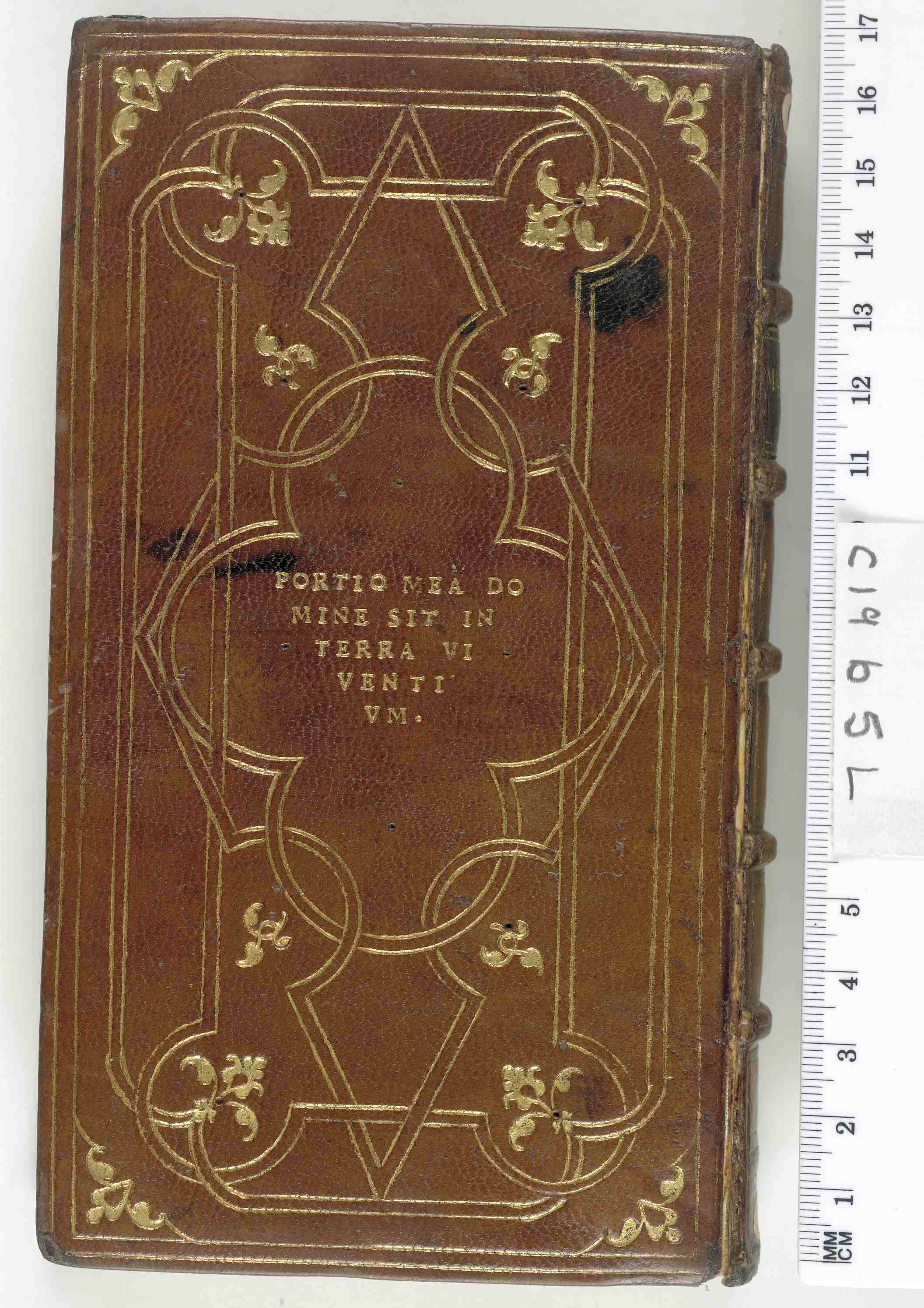

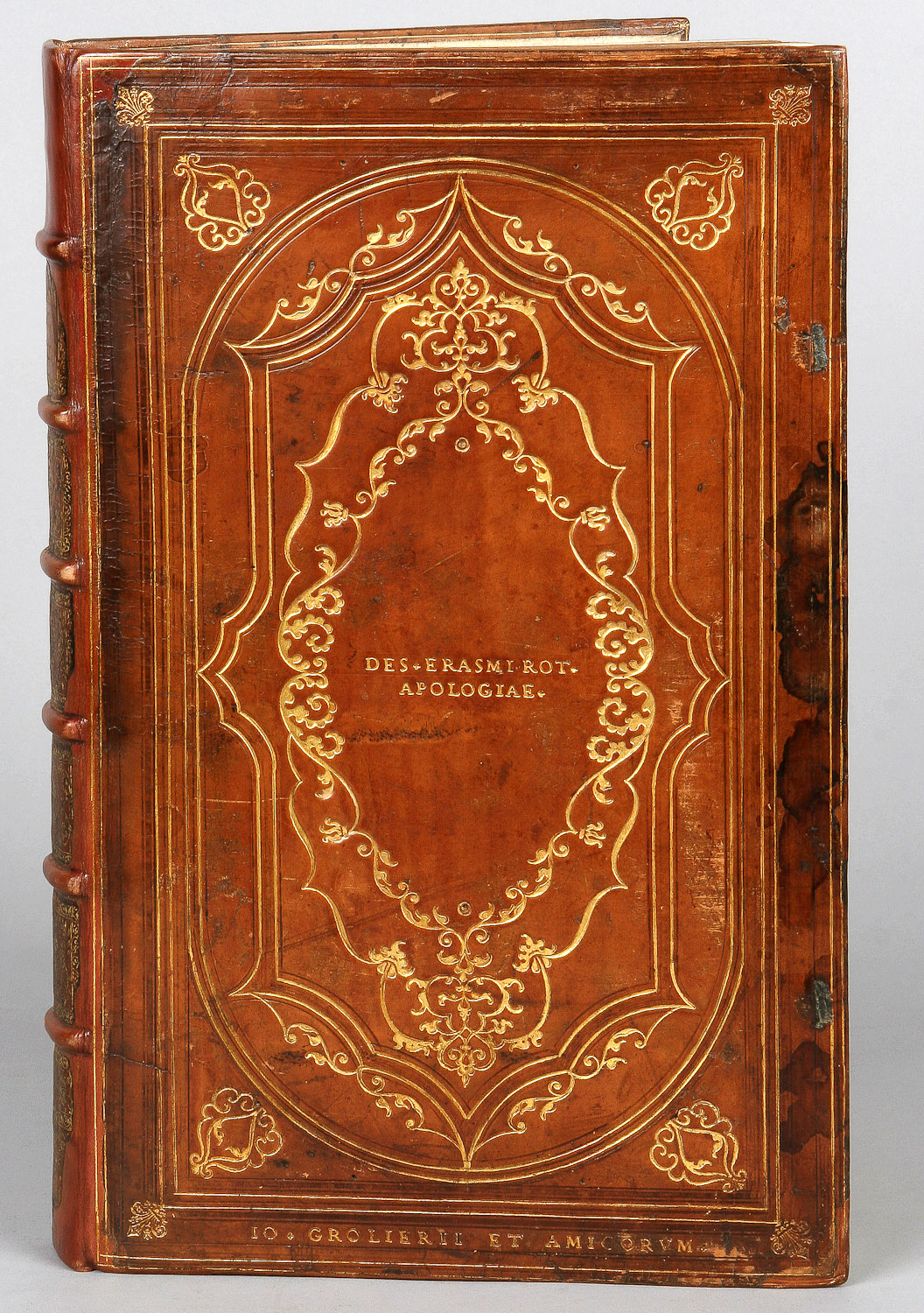

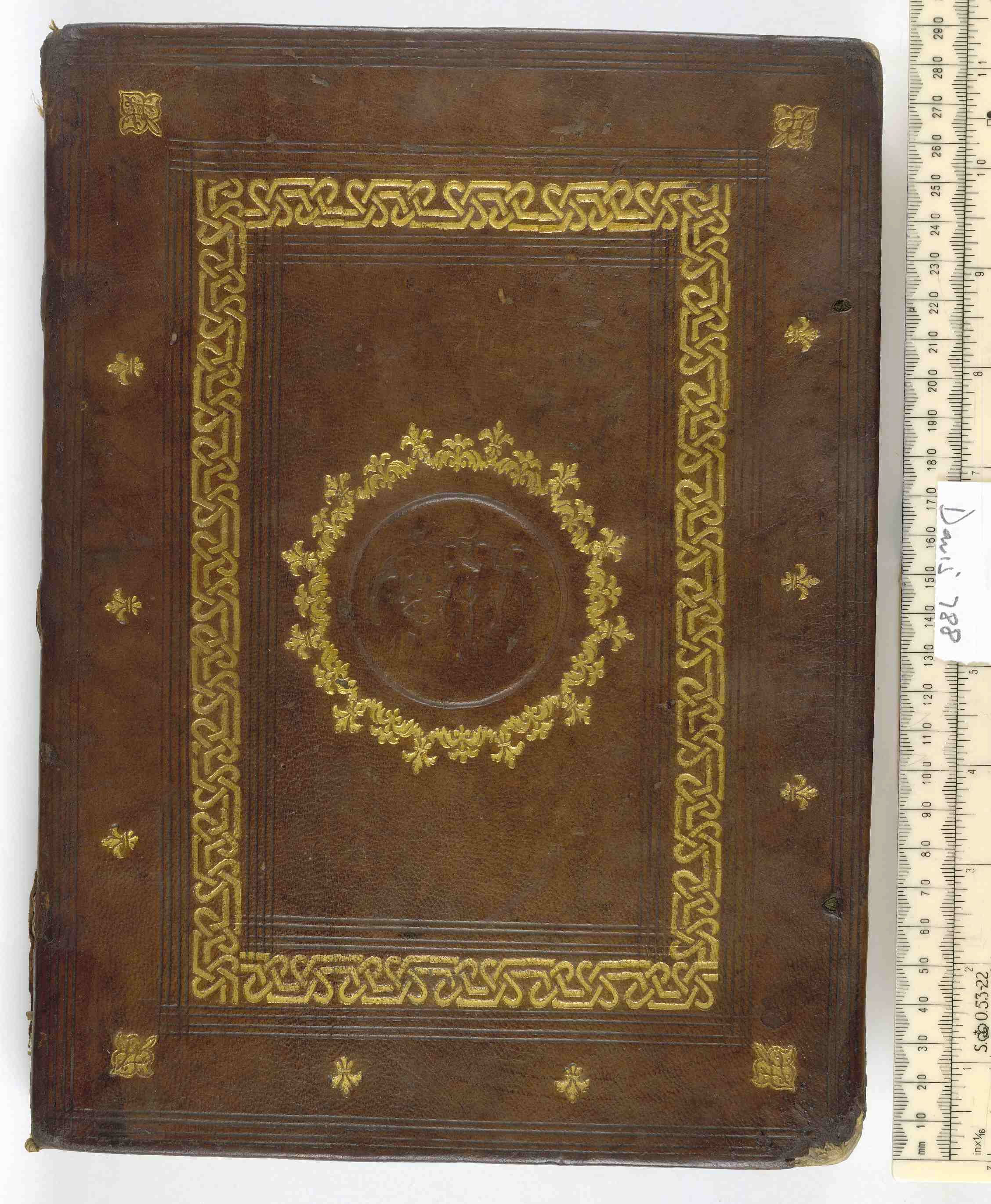

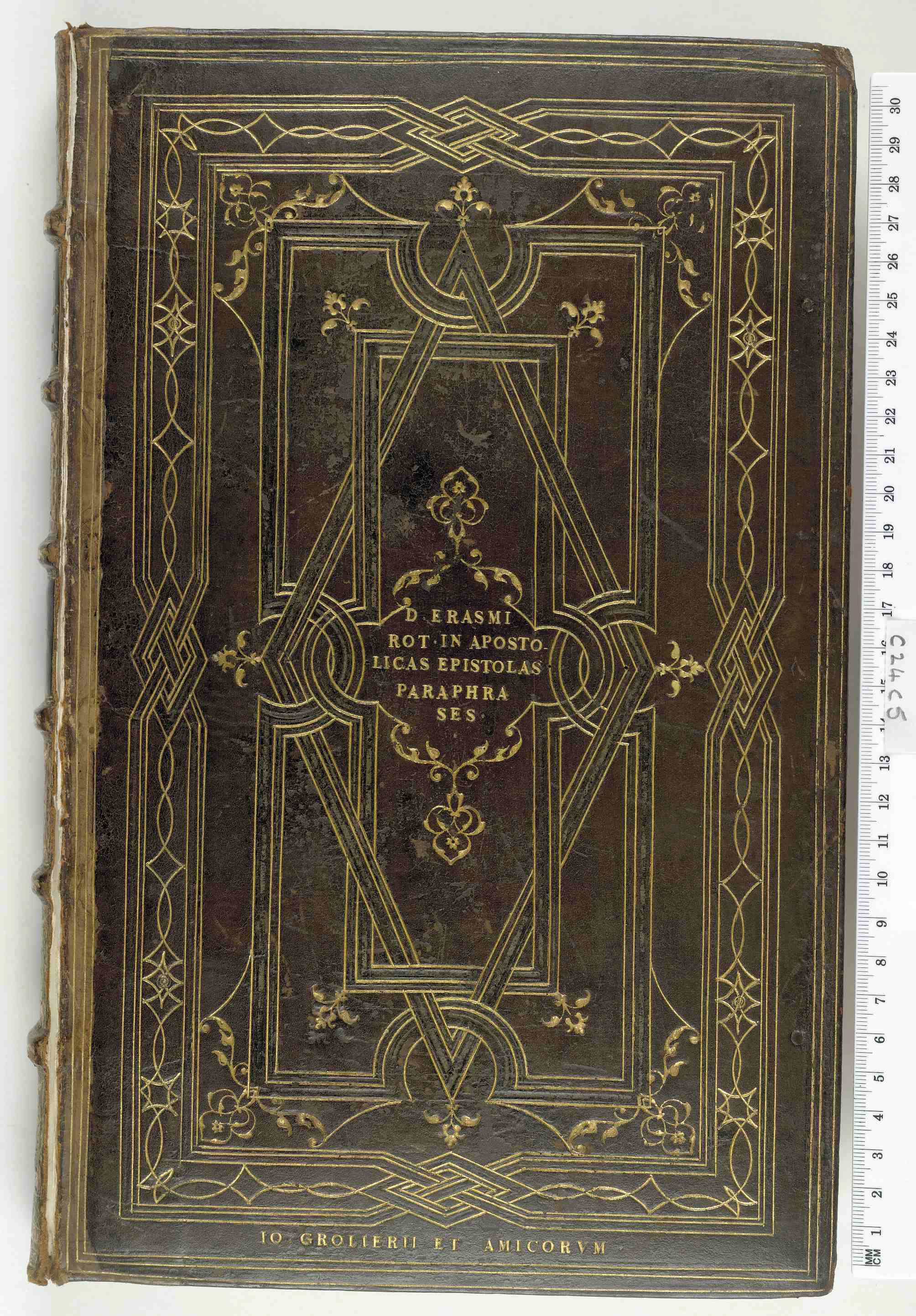

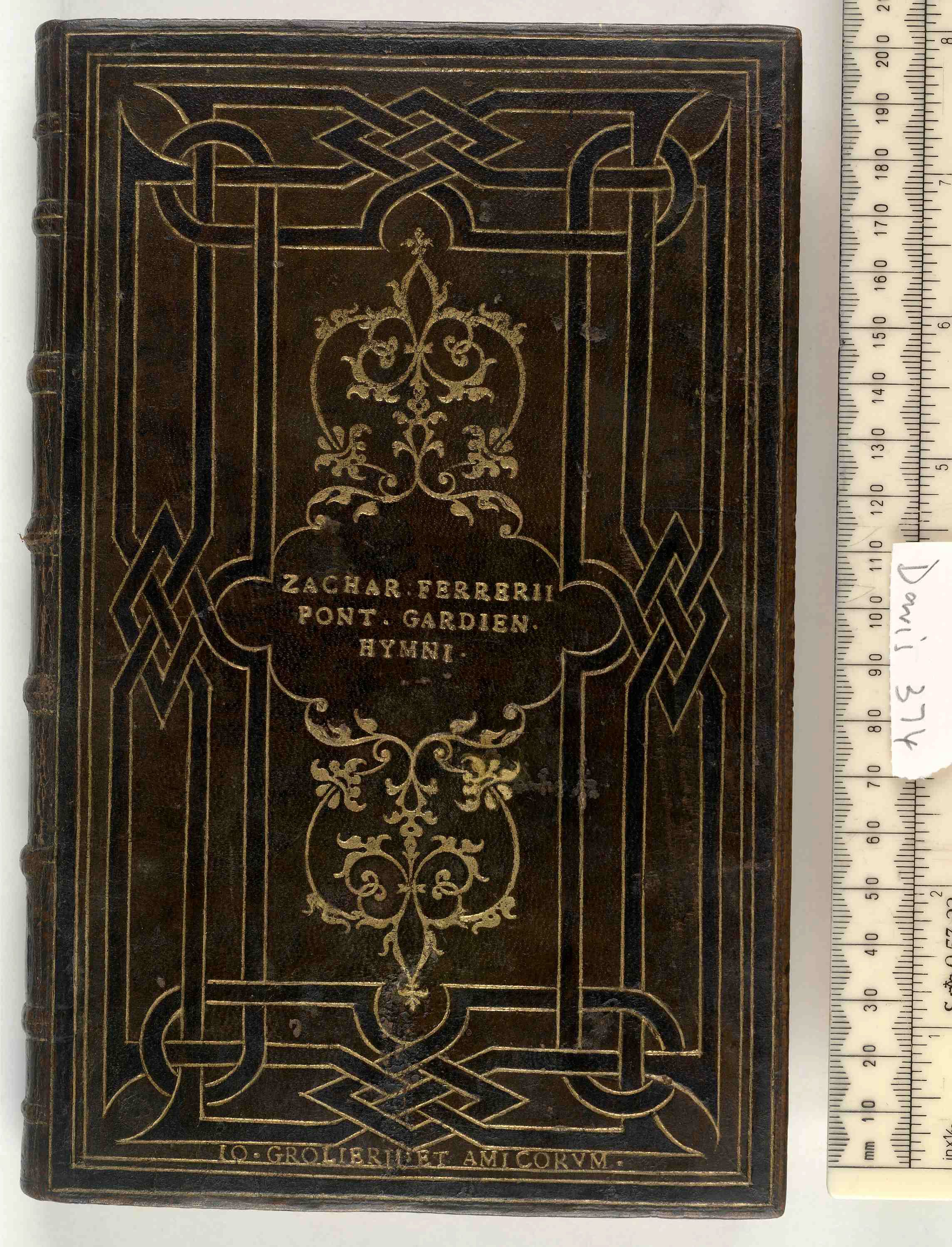

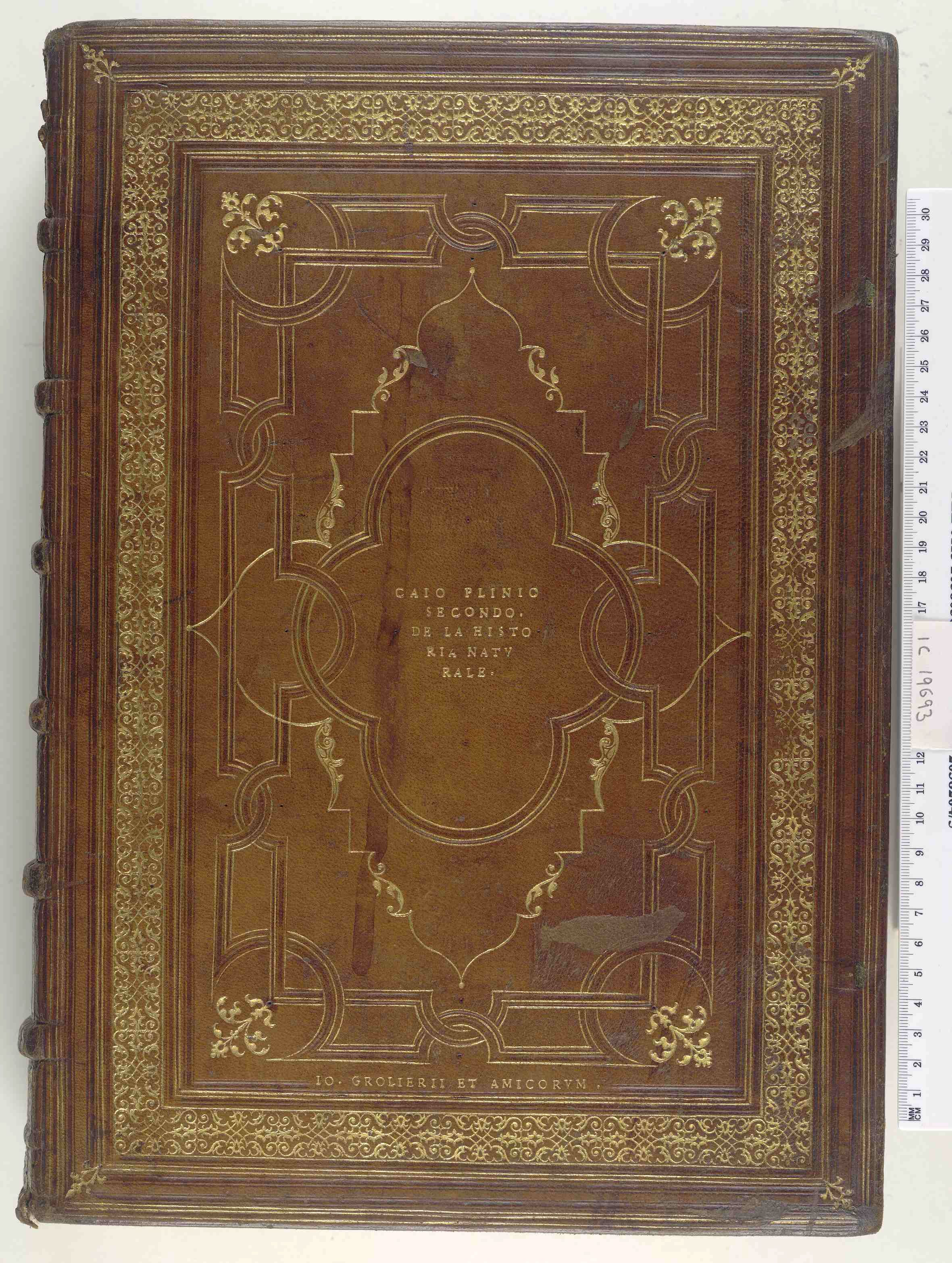

== Legacy ==
Some 500 books can still be identified as having formed part of the library, and for centuries Grolier's reputation as a collector has increased the value of any book associated with him. Some of the books are in public collections such as the British Library and the National Library in Paris, the latter institution having the largest number of Grolier bindings.

The Grolier Club of New York City was named after him by Walter Montgomery Jackson (1863–1923), who had also commemorated him in the publisher, Grolier, that he founded.

== See also ==
- Nicolas Grollier de Servière (1596–1689), Jean Grolier's cousin, a French inventor who became well known for creating a series of fantastic machines.
