= Gomar Estienne =

French bookbinder

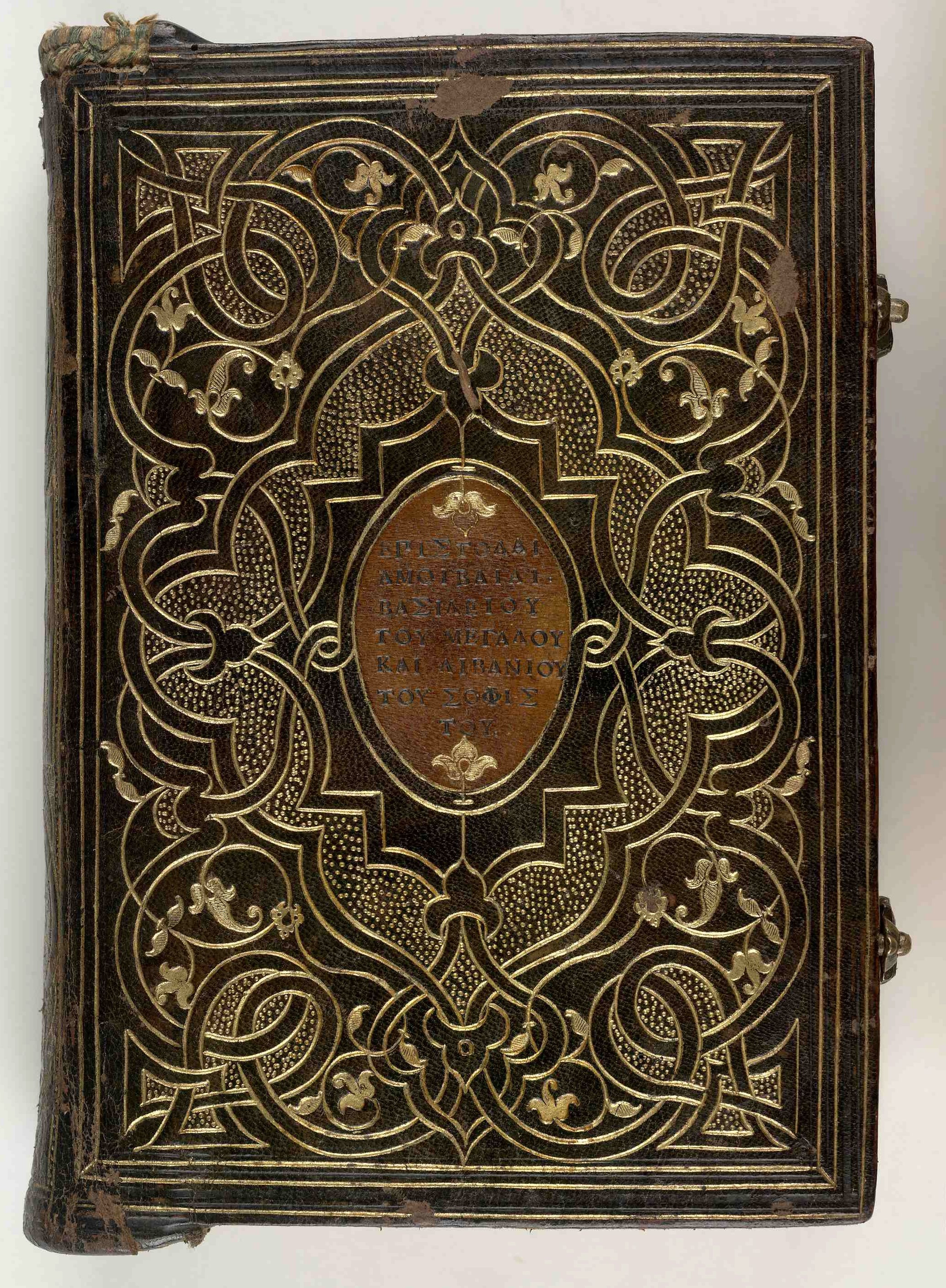
Bookbinding by Gomar Estienne in the British Library

Gomar Estienne (died 1555) was a French bookbinder.

He was born in Brabant, was married to a French woman (possibly from a family of booksellers), and became a French citizen in 1547. In the same year he succeeded Étienne Roffet as bookbinder to the French king at the Palace of Fontainebleau and head of the so-called Fontainebleau workshop, a position he held during its most productive period (1547–1552). He was in turn succeeded by Claude de Picques in this post. Towards the end of his life, a decreased demand from Fontainebleau meant that Estienne could take more private commissions from Paris as well. He died at the latest in the spring of 1555.
