= Balloon Federation of America =

Non-profit group for hot air and gas balloons

Coordinates: 41.3763°N 93.5596°W

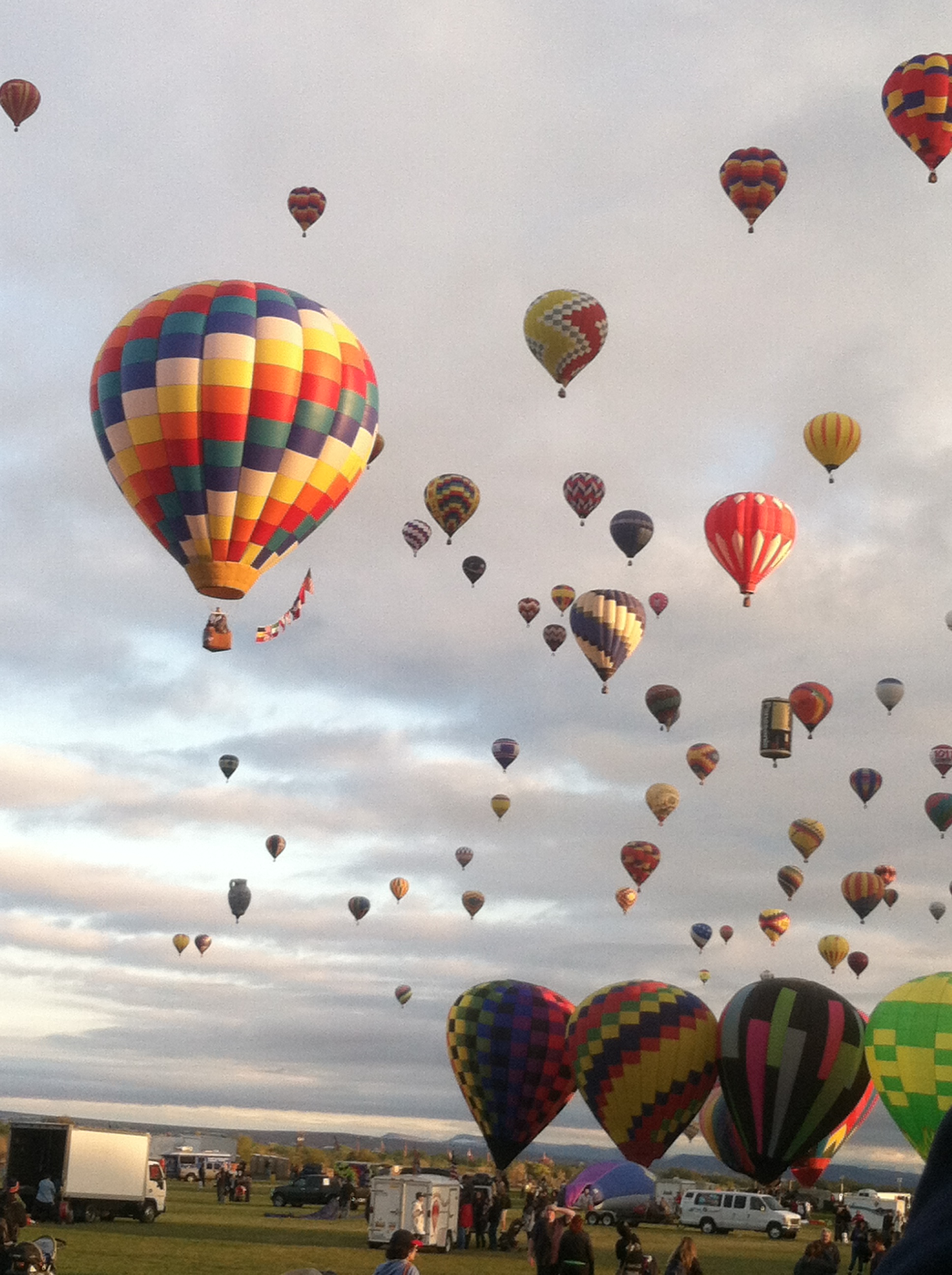
Balloon Fiesta, Fiesta park, Albuquerque, New Mexico

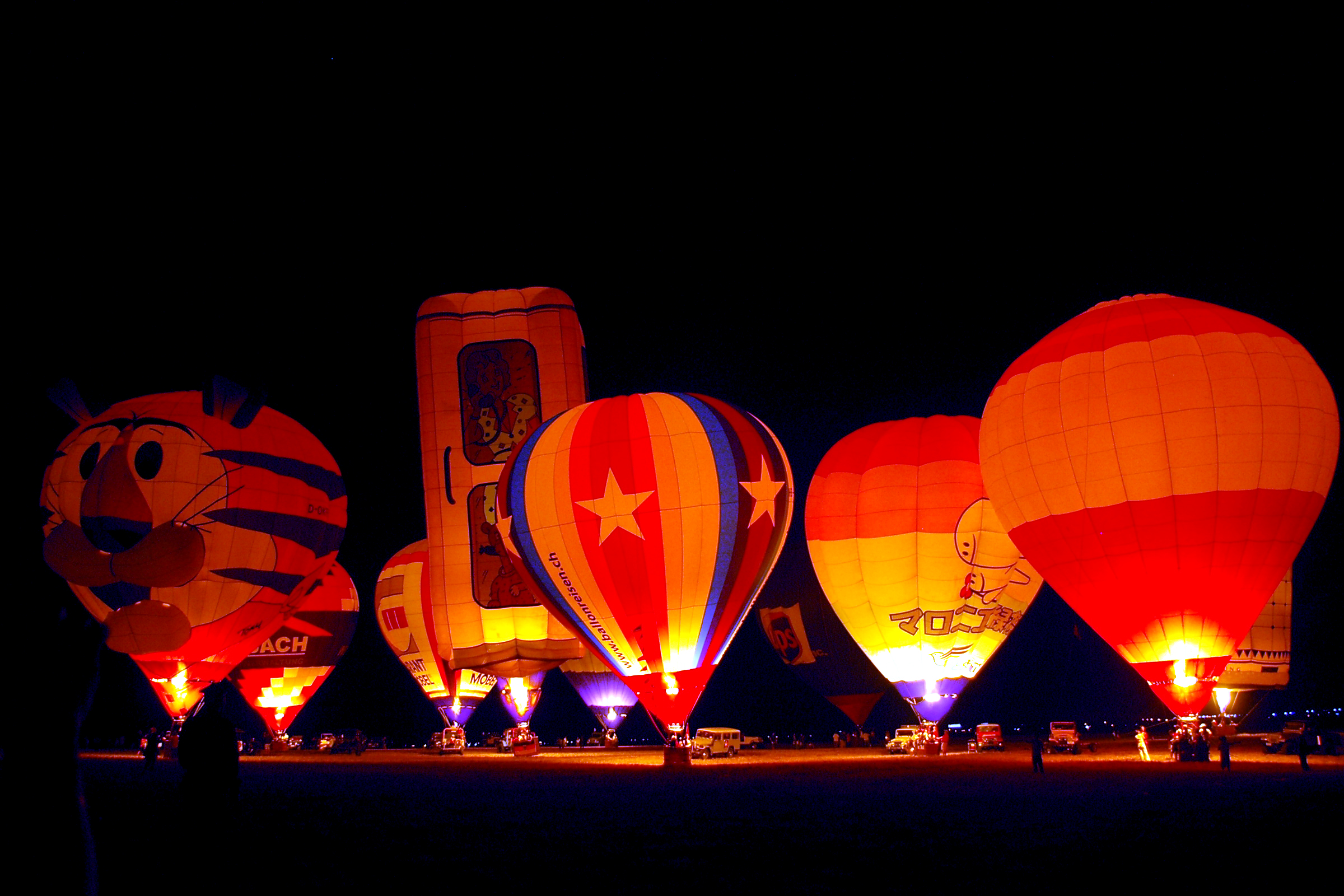
Night glow for pictures

The Balloon Federation of America (BFA) is a 501c3 non-profit group for the advancement of lighter-than-air aviation which includes hot air and gas balloons. Founded in 1960, located in Indianola, Iowa. The BFA partners with the National Balloon Museum to induct outstanding individuals into the United States Ballooning Hall of Fame. The Federation presents multiple awards including the Ed Yost Master Pilot Award and the National Crew Person Award. The BFA facilitates balloon events by providing advice and guidance on FAA compliance.

BFA membership is open to everyone. Membership at BFA.net includes: the organization's magazine "Ballooning;" achievement recognition for pilots, crew, and observers; flight instructor program; balloon education via on-line video library for pilot and Crew training; and on-line safety seminars. Optional membership benefits include: youth programs; balloon regional, national, and world competitions; Professional Ride Operators (PRO) Division; gas balloon competitions including the America's Challenge and Gordon Bennett Cup; and a legal services plan. Operated by volunteers, the National Balloon Museum is colocated with the BFA and the over 100 hot air balloon event the National Balloon Classic.

== Balloon Federation History ==
In 1948, balloonist Don Piccard formed the first national balloon organization in the United States, the Balloon Club of America (BCA). He teamed with early BCA member Tony Fairbanks, a student pilot in the Cleveland Balloon Club (CBC) before WWII, donating an 80,000 cu ft balloon net. Fairbanks was not drafted for WWII so while the Cleveland members went to war he inherited all the CBC's balloons and equipment. US Navy Lieutenant Punderson, working for Douglas Leigh Sky Advertising, convinced owner Douglas Leigh to donate several salvage U.S. Army balloons from the War Assets Administration. These balloons were distributed free to balloon clubs across the country. The National Aeronautic Association (NAA) designated the BCA as the official US representatives to enter European balloon races thereby qualifying the BCA for free air travel on the Military Air Transport Service (MATS). MATS eventually required benefits to be granted only to national associations, thus the Akron balloon group was invited to join the BCA.

In 1960, five years of study and development by a group of General Mills employees, including Ed Yost, produced the modern hot air balloon. A delegation represented by NE Philadelphia FAA tower controller Pete Pellegrino, Iowa lawyer/balloonist Don Kersten, and veteran balloonist Ed Yost, traveled to Washington D.C. seeking government recognition for the BCA. Under the guidance of the National Aeronautic Association, with the support of NAA's Randy Randelman, the Balloon Club created a new organization: "The Balloon Federation of America" (BFA). The initial Balloon Club group volunteered their time, expenses, and initially funded the BFA. Ed Yost, known as the "Father of Hot Air Ballooning", charged new organization members: "Balloons are precious!, make our organization likewise!"

== National Balloon Museum ==
The National Balloon Museum is a non-profit museum that is located in Indianola, Iowa. It was founded in 1975 in short term locations, later gaining a permanent location in 1988. All of the museum's exhibits are about hot air ballooning and gas ballooning. The museum is in the shape of a hot air balloon's gondola. The other large balloon museum in the United States is the Anderson-Abruzzo Albuquerque International Balloon Museum located in Albuquerque, New Mexico.

=== National Balloon Museum origins ===
The US National Hot Air Balloon Championship (BFA) preliminaries were held in Indianola in 1970. Due to the success of the competition, the championships started happening every year which led to exhibits being created yearly for the competition. However, the exhibits could only be put up temporarily. The short term exhibits created a need for a museum where they can be stored year round. The exhibits are from the Balloon Federation of America, covering over 200 years of history. Included in the museum's collection is the first hot air balloon that crossed the English Channel. Located within the museum is the U.S. Ballooning Hall of Fame, a children's area and a library. The children's area has photo shoots and books about ballooning.

All of the museum's workers are volunteers. 24,000 people visit the museum each year, with the visitors coming from twenty countries. The museum has hosted a nine day long festival, titled the National Balloon Classic, yearly in late July since 1989. A large donation was received to continue the museum's operation in 2015. The donation was left in a will and was in a large unspecified amount.

=== U.S. Ballooning Hall of Fame ===
The U.S. Ballooning Hall of Fame is located at the National Balloon Museum in Indianola, Iowa and "recognizes persons who have contributed in significant ways to the sport and or development of Ballooning."

The following persons have been inducted into the Hall of Fame:

- 2004: Paul E. (Ed) Yost
- 2005: Don N. Kersten, Sidney D. Cutter
- 2006: Bruce Comstock, Peter Pellegrino
- 2007: Deke Sonnichsen, Malcolm Stevenson Forbes
- 2008: Tracy Barnes, Eddie Allen
- 2009: Jim Winker, Lucy Luck Stefan, Karl H. Stefan
- 2010: Anthony M. Fairbanks, Joseph W. Kittinger, Jr., Thomas A.F. Sheppard
- 2011: Ben L. Abruzzo, Maxie Anderson, Dewey Reinhard
- 2012: Carol Rymer Davis, Dr. William Grabb, Matt Wiederkehr
- 2013: Dennis E. Floden, William Murtorff, Dr. Clayton Lay Thomas
- 2014: Nikki Caplan, Chauncey Dunn, Don Piccard
- 2015: Robert Dodds Meddock, Jr., Constance C. Wolf
- 2016: Troy Bradley, Bill Bussey, Bob Sparks
- 2017: David Levin, Steve Fossett, Thaddeus Lowe
- 2018: Debbra Spaeth, Alan Blount, Ward Van Orman
- 2019: Eleanor Vadala, Jim Birk—McAllen, Nick Saum
- 2020: Coy Foster, Mark Sullivan

== Balloon Licensing ==
Depending on the size of the balloon, location, and intended use, hot air balloons and their pilots need to comply with a variety of regulations.

=== Balloons ===
All aircraft in the US which includes hot air balloons subject to FAA regulations via US Title 14 Code of Federal Regulations (CFR). All balloons must be registered with an N-number, have an airworthiness certificate, and pass an annual inspection. Balloons below a certain size (empty weight of less than 155 pounds or 70 kg including envelope, basket, burners and empty fuel tanks) can be used as an ultralight aircraft.

=== Pilots ===
Pilot certificates are issued by the FAA via US Title 14 Code of Federal Regulations (CFR) Part 61 - CERTIFICATION: PILOTS, FLIGHT INSTRUCTORS, AND GROUND INSTRUCTORS. Pilots must operate via Title 14 CFR PART 91—GENERAL OPERATING AND FLIGHT RULES. Raven Industries developed the first modern hot air balloon in 1960-1961 and being a new aircraft, no specific FAA requirements existed. Circa 1963, Raven Industries engaged the FAA for certifying hot air balloons. Around 1964 the FAA introduced the balloon category with no requirements until 1974 with 14 CFR Part 61 guidance for Private and Commercial pilot certificates.

== See also ==
- Don Piccard
- Ed Yost
- Hot air balloon festival
- Hot air ballooning
- Hot air balloon
- National Balloon Museum
- Anderson-Abruzzo Albuquerque International Balloon Museum
