= Balloon Museum (disambiguation) =

Balloon Museum may refer to:

- Balloon Museum, a travelling visual arts exhibition
- National Balloon Museum, a museum in Indianola, Iowa, United States
- Anderson Abruzzo Albuquerque International Balloon Museum, a museum in Albuquerque, New Mexico, United States
- Taiwan Balloons Museum, a museum in Taichung, Taiwan
- The Balloon Museum at Château de Balleroy in Balleroy, Normandy, France
