= Wifi Dabba =

Indian internet services company

- Company type: Private
- Industry: Internet Services Provider
- Founded: 2016
- Founder: Shubhendu Sharma and Karam Lakshman
- Headquarters: Bangalore, India
- Number of locations: 3
- Number of employees: 45
- Website: wifidabba.com

WiFi Dabba is a registered Indian internet services company that provides low-cost distributed internet services based out of Bangalore, Karnataka. Individuals from around the world can purchase hotspots, which are then deployed by WiFi Dabba's partner Local Cable Operators (LCOs) in India.

== History ==
WiFi Dabba was founded in 2016 by Shubhendu Sharma and Karam Lakshman as a low-cost internet service provider in Bangalore, India. The company began operations in 2017 and was incubated and funded by Y Combinator.

Initially, WiFi Dabba operated as an ISP aggregator, offering inexpensive prepaid data packs. The company introduced proprietary wireless laser devices, known as Supernodes, which it claimed could significantly reduce internet costs.

According to media reports, their laser mesh network in Bangalore draws inspiration from Google's discontinued project Loon, which sought to deliver internet access to underserved regions using high-altitude balloons. Various media reports also compared WiFi Dabba to Reliance Jio for its competitive pricing strategy.

Because of cheap data, the majority of their clients initially came from lower-income groups or first time smartphone users in Bangalore.

In 2017, the company launched a feature requiring mobile users in India only to fill their mobile number to purchase a prepaid coupon and access their internet services without any scratch cards.

In the same year, Wifi Dabba also became a part of Telecom Regulatory Authority of India (TRAI’s) Mission for Wi-Fi Access Network Interface (WANI), also known as PM WANI program, and installed 430 internet access points in Bangalore. The PM WANI program was designed to boost wireless internet connectivity in India.

In 2018, Wifi Dabba expanded its services to co-living residential complexes in Bangalore. By 2020, the company had invested $1.7 million in developing laser hotspots, it calls Supernodes.
