= Buxton Park Arboretum =

Arboretum and botanical garden in Indianola, Iowa, United States

Coordinates: 41.3668°N 93.5637°W

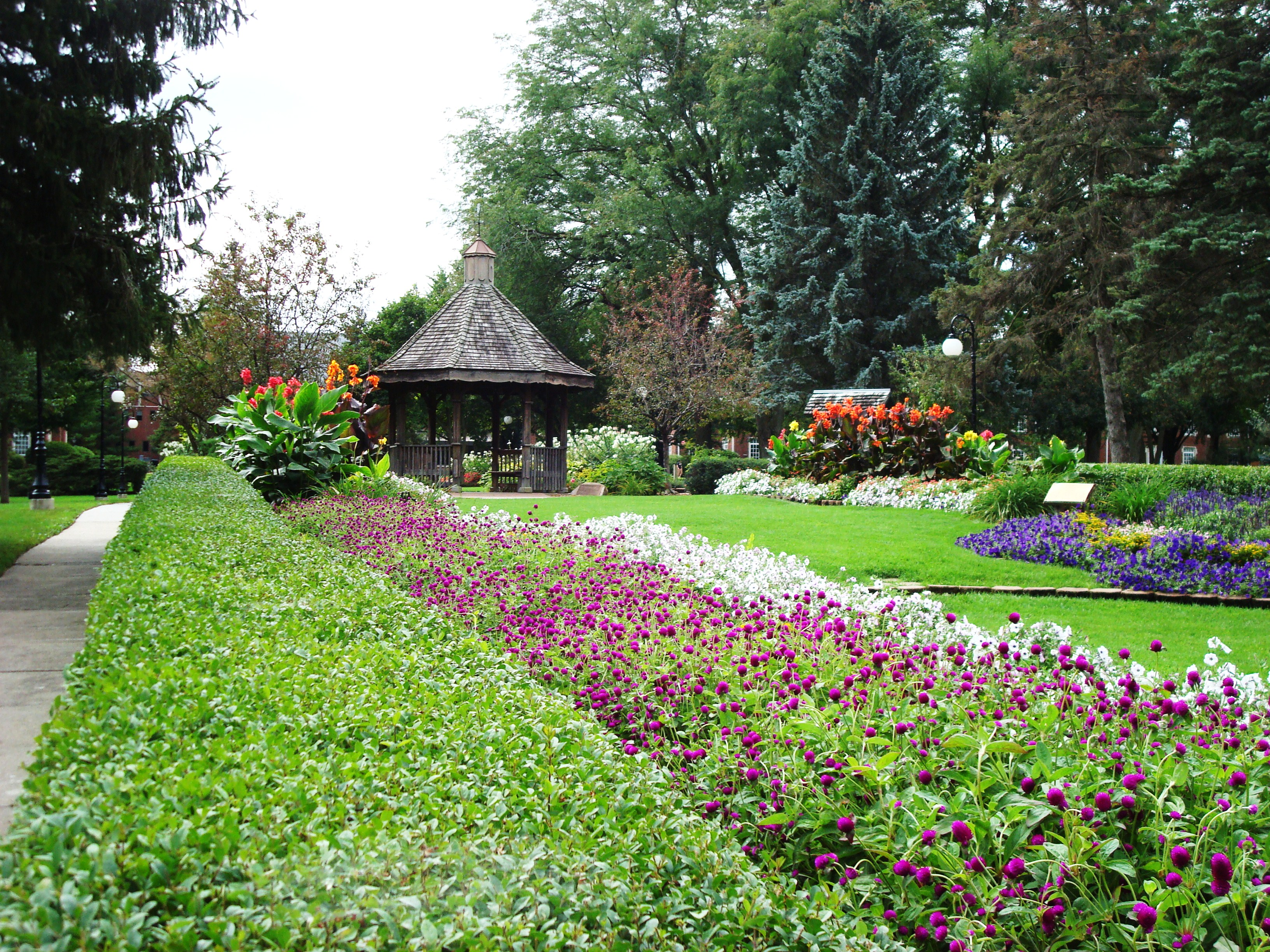
- Flower gardens and gazebo in Buxton Park Arboretum
- Interactive map of Buxton Park Arboretum

Buxton Park Arboretum 5.4 acres (2.2 ha) is an arboretum and botanical garden located at the intersection of North Buxton Street and West Girard Avenue, Indianola, Iowa. It is situated just north of Simpson College, and is open to the public without charge.

== History ==
The park was donated to the city in December 1905 by William Buxton Sr. with the understanding that it would be used to establish the city's first park. He called it a "Christmas Gift to the public." The park is now one of 12 in the city. The park's first custodian was John Hessling, who planted many of the trees. Hessling was originally from Holland, which he left when the property he was working on was purchased by Kaiser Wilhelm II, who was in exile from Germany at the time.

The park had few manmade features at the time of its creation. A fountain and gazebo were built sometime between 1905 and 1913. The entrance to the park was rebuilt by Roy Sterling in 1952, who was commissioned to do so by the Park Commission for $41.25 plus a materials cost of $10.18. Despite this effort, the park was almost closed in February 1955 due to poor maintenance. This is no longer a concern.

== Features ==
The Arboretum was donated to the town in 1906 by William and Francis Buxton. It now contains formal botanical gardens with twelve flowerbeds, an arboretum, a fountain, a butterfly garden, and a gazebo. The park is ADA accessible and has a children's garden with various activities.

The park has a self-guided audio walking tour that introduces the listener to the 25 types of trees in the park.

The park hosts the annual Indianola Summer Art Festival during the National Balloon Classic.

== See also ==
- List of botanical gardens in the United States
