= Eleanor Vadala =

American chemist, materials engineer and balloonist (1923–2023)

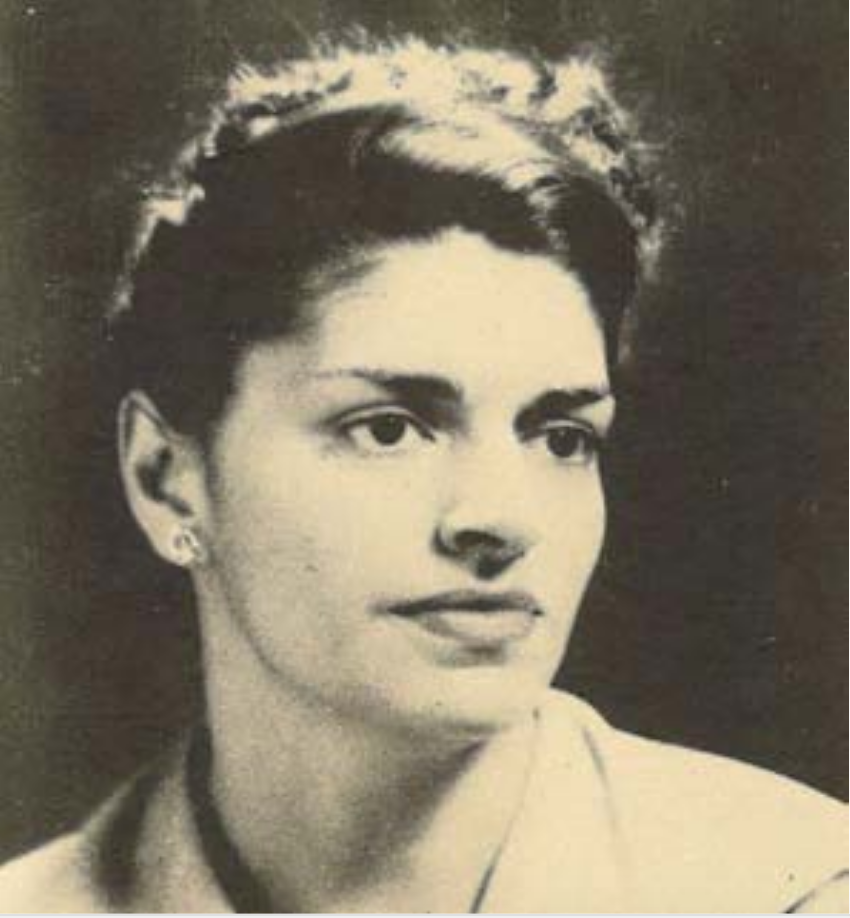
- Vadala in 1953
- Born: September 8, 1923; National Park, New Jersey, U.S.
- Died: July 19, 2023 (aged 99); Bala Cynwyd, Pennsylvania, U.S.
- Education: Juniata College
- Scientific career
- Fields: Materials science, ballooning
- Workplaces: Franklin Institute, Naval Air Development Center in Warminster, PA

External videos
- "Eleanor Vadala's First Flight", March 6, 2018

Eleanor Vadala (September 8, 1923 – July 19, 2023) was an American chemist, materials engineer and balloonist. She became director of research and development at the Naval Air Development Center in Pennsylvania, where she helped to develop light synthetic materials for use in aircraft. One of her jobs was the testing of fabric in existing balloons to ensure they could be used safely.

Vadala was the third woman in the United States to be FAA-certified as a balloon pilot. As member of the Balloon Club of America, Vadala participated in 66 balloon flights, 47 flights in gas balloons and 19 flights in hot air balloons. Vadala was one of the first female pilots to participate internationally. She was involved in 13 flights hosted by the Fédération Aéronautique Internationale (FAI) between 1959 and 1963.

On July 28, 2019, Vadala was inducted into the Balloon Federation of America Hall of Fame, at the National Balloon Museum in Indianola, Iowa.

== Education and early career ==
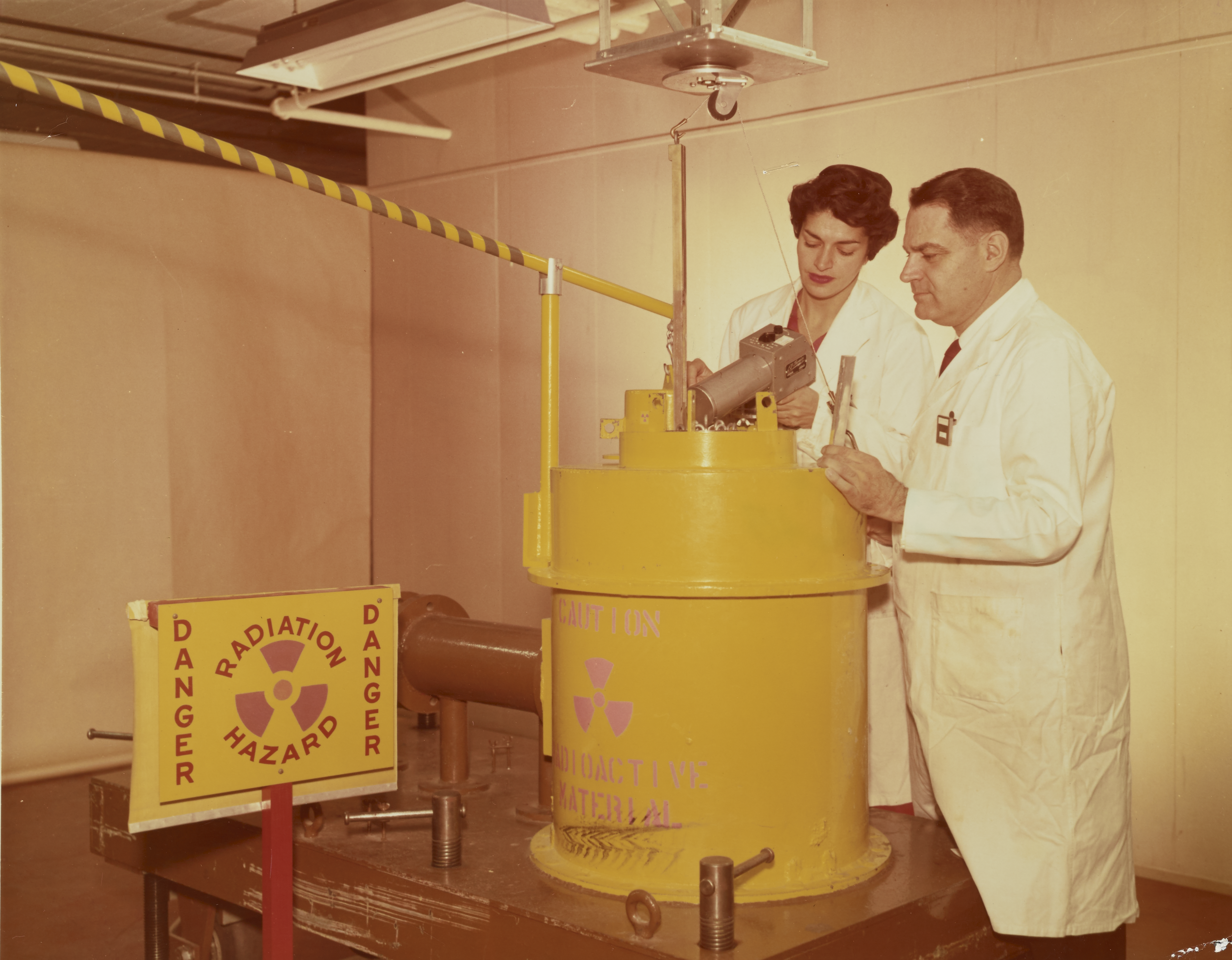
Eleanor Vadala and C. A. Cassola with a barrel of radioactive material, 1959

Eleanor Vadala was born on September 8, 1923, in National Park, New Jersey. She attended school in Atlantic City and Cardiff in New Jersey, and Philadelphia, Pennsylvania.

Between 1943 and 1945, Vadala worked at Kellett Aircraft Company, making aircraft parts. After World War II ended, she returned to university at Juniata College in Huntingdon, Pennsylvania. She graduated in 1947 with a Bachelor of Science in nutrition and a minor in chemistry. Upon graduating from Juniata College, she continued her educational journey by taking several chemistry courses at Temple University.

After graduating, Vadala worked at the Franklin Institute for eight years, as a lecturer on science and technology. She has said that she loved the work, but it did not pay well. Vadala volunteered at the Franklin for another ten years after finding a new job. In 1957 she helped to record the orbit of the Russia's Sputnik satellite as part of the Franklin Institute's Moon Watch Team.

Interested in astronomy, she built by herself a 6-inch telescope. She joined the Rittenhouse Astronomy Society, eventually serving as Treasurer, Secretary, and President. Her acceptance of the presidency at a time when the organization had largely fallen into disarray was important in restarting its activities. For two terms, she served the Astronomical League in the position of Secretary of the Middle East.

== Aviation materials research ==
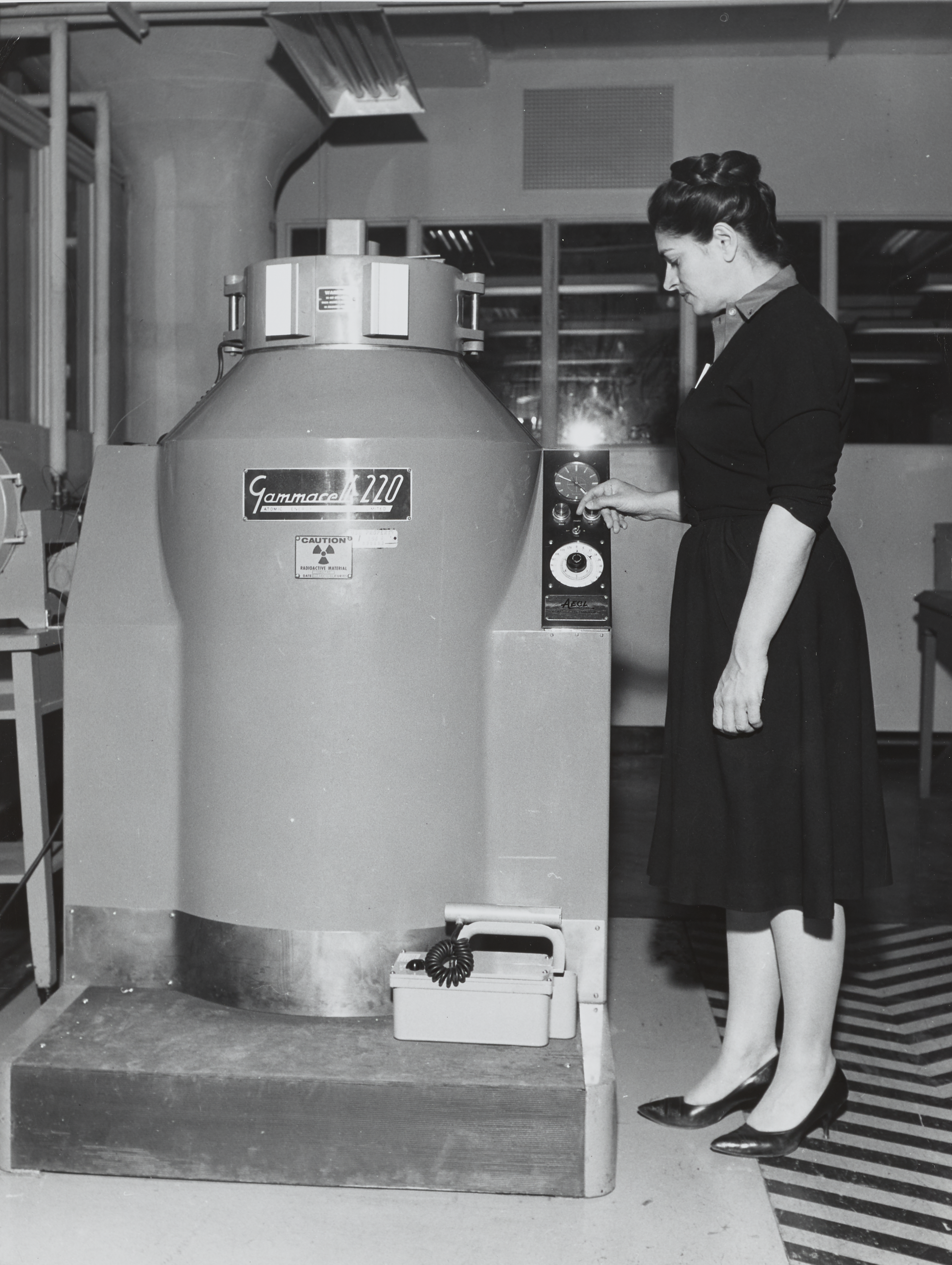
Eleanor Vadala with Gammacell 220 at the Naval Air Material Center, 1958

Eleanor Vadala worked for the Naval Air Development department, studying synthetic laminated materials for use in the construction of aircraft. She held positions at the Naval Air Material Center at the Philadelphia Naval Yard, which carried out materials testing and laboratory experiments, and at the Naval Air Development Center in Warminster, Pennsylvania. She eventually became director of research and development at the Naval Air Development Center.

One of her jobs involved testing the balloons stored in the Naval Air Facility in Lakehurst, New Jersey, to ensure that they were still safe to use. She used an Instron Tensile Testing machine to assess the weight, compressive strength and tensile strength of the fabrics used. As a result of her findings, a number of balloons were ruled unfit for use.

Vadala also used the Instron to test laminated light weight materials to see if they were suitable for use in aircraft. Her publications include Failure mechanisms for advanced composite sandwich construction in hostile environments (1979) and Triaxially Woven Fabrics of Kevlar, Dacron Polyester and Hybrids of Kevlar and Dacron Polyester (1980).

== Ballooning ==
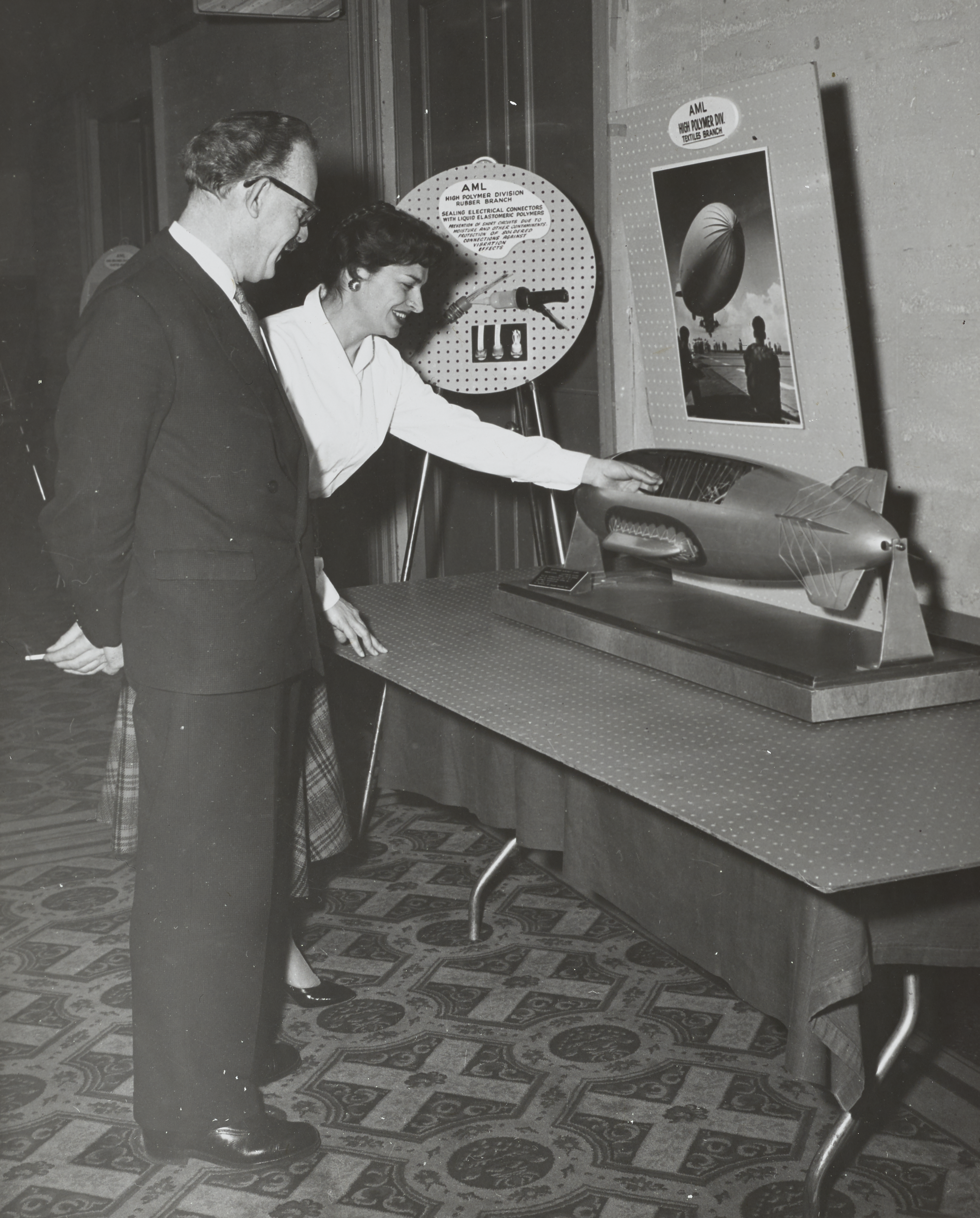
Eleanor Vadala and Earl Hayes, viewing an Airship fabric display, 1959

Vadala was introduced to ballooning through Tony Fairbanks, a fellow member of the Rittenhouse Astronomy Society. Fairbanks was a charter member of the Balloon Club of America (BCA), incorporated in 1952 in Swarthmore, Pennsylvania.

Eleanor Vadala enjoyed her first balloon flight on January 9, 1954, a date that commemorated the first balloon flight in the Americas on January 9, 1793, by Jean-Pierre Blanchard. Don Piccard piloted the Balloon Club of America's N9071H, a former U.S. Army balloon built by Goodyear, on its fourth flight for the BCA. Known as the "Old 80", N9071H was an 80,000-cubic-foot (2,300 m^{3}) gas balloon. Don Piccard was accompanied by Francis Shield, Eleanor Vadala, and another first-time woman balloonist, Kate C. Ornsen. They landed in Netcong, New Jersey. Vadala has spoken eloquently of their landing. "We drifted down like one of the snowflakes. We touched down and landed so softly that the deer didn't even move—such a quiet serenity with the snow coming down so gently." The flight was reported by The Philadelphia Inquirer and other newspapers and was the basis for Argosy's April 1954 cover story.

Vadala's second hot air balloon flight was on July 4, 1954, with Tony Fairbanks. They flew from Valley Forge airport, celebrating Independence Day.

Vadala became an active member of the BCA, not only learning to fly, but also repairing the balloons, making nets for them, filling sandbags to use as weights, and driving the chase vehicles that followed the balloons after they launched. The club launched from both the Valley Forge Airport and from Wings Field in Blue Bell, Pennsylvania.

Vadala was the third woman to receive FAA Balloon Pilot Certification, passing the written test on June 27, 1962, and the flight test on July 13, 1963. She flew from Doylestown, Pennsylvania, to Hilltown, Pennsylvania. Vadala was preceded as a licensed woman balloon pilot in the United States by Constance C. Wolf ("Connie Wolf"), November 26, 1956, and by Jeannette Piccard who was issued her FAI-ACA ballooning license as of July 27, 1934.

Vadala's first solo flight occurred on October 20, 1962, in La Coquette. She flew from Lafayette Hill, Pennsylvania, to College Avenue in Havertown, Pennsylvania. One of her early solo flights was mentioned with a photograph, in Sports Illustrated for December 24, 1962.

Originally owned by the Navy, the balloon La Coquette was constructed in 1928, and later sold to the Balloon Club of America. In 1955, it was redecorated and featured in the 1956 film "Around the World in Eighty Days". (The original book by Jules Verne did not include a balloon flight.) After filming, La Coquette was returned to the Club and continued to fly.

In 1967, the Philadelphia Navy Yard decided to commemorate their 50th anniversary with a gas balloon launch. Vadala organized the launch, and was pilot-in-command of La Coquette for the flight, which occurred on July 29, 1967.

Vadala presented public educational programs about ballooning and was an instructor for hot air balloons. Unofficially, she served as the first secretary of the Balloon Federation of America, when it was formed in 1961.

Vadala also taught classes in English as a Second Language (ESL) to immigrants. At age 63 she married an amateur balloonist, Rittenhouse Astronomical Society member, and astronomer for the Franklin Institute, Edwin F. Bailey (1907–1986). After his death, she established the Edwin F. Bailey Scholarship Award at Villanova University in his memory.

== Death ==
Eleanor Vadala died at her home in Bala Cynwyd, Pennsylvania, on July 19, 2023, at the age of 99.
