= M. Joan Alexander =

Atmospheric scientist

- Education: University of Colorado, Boulder
- Scientific career
- Thesis: The Venus 130-nm dayglow as a diagnostic of thermospherica structure and dynamics (1992)

M. Joan Alexander is an atmospheric scientist known for her research on gravity waves and their role in atmospheric circulation.

== Education and career ==
Alexander earned a B.S. in chemistry from Purdue University in 1981 and a M.S. in Astrophysical, Planetary & Atmospheric Sciences from University of Colorado, Boulder in 1989. She then completed her Ph.D. in Astrophysical, Planetary & Atmospheric Sciences in 1992 from the University of Colorado, Boulder.

Following her Ph.D., Alexander worked at Hughes Aircraft Company, Great Lakes Chemical Company, Martin Marietta Aerospace Corporation before moving to the University of Colorado, Boulder as a Research Assistant in 1987. In 1992 she moved to the University of Washington, first as postdoctoral faculty (1992-1994) and then as a research assistant professor. In 1998 she joined NorthWest Research Associates where she is a senior research scientist; she also holds the position of Professor Adjoint at the University of Colorado, Boulder.

From 2004 to 2006, Alexander was the president of the Atmospheric Sciences section of the American Geophysical Union.

== Research ==
Alexander's research interests include atmospheric dynamics, waves, convection, global circulation modeling, mesoscale modeling, satellite, aircraft, balloon-borne observations, and middle atmosphere studies. Alexander's early research examined changes in atomic oxygen in the atmospheres of Venus and Mars. Following this period, she began examining waves in the atmosphere such as high-frequency gravity waves formed during storms. She also established the conditions to adequately characterize gravity waves in the stratosphere, how to parameterize gravity waves in climate models, and how satellite imagery can be used to track atmospheric gravity waves. Through this research, Alexander is able to link gravity waves with climate modeling and modeling of storms.

Alexander's research uses high altitude balloons that circle the globe in the stratosphere and collect data on the air and winds. In 2020, Alexander received funding from the National Science Foundation to use data from balloons being launched by Loon LLC to provide internet service; the high resolution data from the balloons will allow Alexander and colleagues to track gravity waves in the atmosphere and use the resulting data to improve weather and climate models.

=== Selected publications ===
- Alexander, M. J.; Holton, J. R.; Durran, D. R. (1995-06-15). "The Gravity Wave Response above Deep Convection in a Squall Line Simulation". Journal of the Atmospheric Sciences. 52 (12): 2212–2226. Bibcode:1995JAtS...52.2212A. doi:10.1175/1520-0469(1995)052<2212:TGWRAD>2.0.CO;2. hdl:2060/19960048434. ISSN 0022-4928. S2CID 122955810.
- Alexander, M. J. (1998). "Interpretations of observed climatological patterns in stratospheric gravity wave variance". Journal of Geophysical Research: Atmospheres. 103 (D8): 8627–8640. Bibcode:1998JGR...103.8627A. doi:10.1029/97JD03325. ISSN 2156-2202.
- Fritts, David C.; Alexander, M. Joan (2003). "Gravity wave dynamics and effects in the middle atmosphere". Reviews of Geophysics. 41 (1): 1003. Bibcode:2003RvGeo..41.1003F. doi:10.1029/2001RG000106. ISSN 1944-9208. S2CID 122701606.
- Alexander, M. J.; Geller, M.; McLandress, C.; Polavarapu, S.; Preusse, P.; Sassi, F.; Sato, K.; Eckermann, S.; Ern, M.; Hertzog, A.; Kawatani, Y. (2010). "Recent developments in gravity-wave effects in climate models and the global distribution of gravity-wave momentum flux from observations and models". Quarterly Journal of the Royal Meteorological Society. 136 (650): 1103–1124. Bibcode:2010QJRMS.136.1103A. doi:10.1002/qj.637. hdl:11336/16993. ISSN 1477-870X. S2CID 33500010.

== Awards ==
- Bjerknes Lecturer, American Geophysical Union (2000)
- Fellow, American Meteorological Society (2006)
- Fellow, American Geophysical Union (2017)
