= Junior D. Edwards =

Korean War Medal of Honor recipient

- Medal of Honor recipient
- Born: October 7, 1926; Indianola, Iowa, US
- Died: January 2, 1951 (aged 24) near Wonju, Korea
- Military career
- Allegiance: United States
- Branch: United States Army
- Service years: 1945–1946, 1947–1951
- Rank: Sergeant First Class
- Units: Company E, 2nd Battalion, 23rd Infantry Regiment, 2nd Infantry Division
- Conflicts: World War II; Korean War: First Battle of Wonju (DOW)
- Awards: Medal of Honor; Purple Heart

Junior Dean Edwards (October 7, 1926 – January 2, 1951) was a soldier in the United States Army during the Korean War. He posthumously received the Medal of Honor for his actions on January 2, 1951, during the First Battle of Wonju.

Edwards joined the Army from his birthplace of Indianola, Iowa in January 1945, and served in the final months of World War II as a cook and a military policeman, until he was discharged in August 1946. He rejoined the Army in June 1947.

== Medal of Honor citation ==
Rank and organization: Sergeant First Class, U.S. Army, Company E, 23rd Infantry Regiment, 2nd Infantry Division

Place and date: Near Changbong-ni, Korea, January 2, 1951,

Entered service at: Indianola, Iowa. Born: October 7, 1926, Indianola, Iowa

G.O. No.: 13, February 1, 1952

Citation:

Sfc. Edwards, Company E, distinguished himself by conspicuous gallantry and intrepidity above and beyond the call of duty in action against the enemy. When his platoon, while assisting in the defense of a strategic hill, was forced out of its position and came under vicious raking fire from an enemy machine gun set up on adjacent high ground, Sfc. Edwards individually charged the hostile emplacement, throwing grenades as he advanced. The enemy withdrew but returned to deliver devastating fire when he had expended his ammunition. Securing a fresh supply of grenades, he again charged the emplacement, neutralized the weapon and killed the crew, but was forced back by hostile small-arms fire. When the enemy emplaced another machine gun and resumed fire, Sfc. Edwards again renewed his supply of grenades, rushed a third time through a vicious hail of fire, silenced this second gun and annihilated its crew. In this third daring assault he was mortally wounded but his indomitable courage and successful action enabled his platoon to regain and hold the vital strongpoint. Sfc. Edwards' consummate valor and gallant self-sacrifice reflect the utmost glory upon himself and are in keeping with the esteemed traditions of the infantry and military service.

== Medals and Decorations ==

Badge	Combat Infantryman Badge		
1st row	Medal of Honor	Purple Heart	Army Good Conduct Medal
2nd row	American Campaign Medal	World War II Victory Medal	National Defense Service Medal
3rd row	Korean Service Medal with 3 Campaign stars	United Nations Service Medal Korea	Korean War Service Medal Retroactively Awarded, 2003
Unit awards	Korean Presidential Unit Citation		

== See also ==
- List of Medal of Honor recipients
- List of Korean War Medal of Honor recipients
