= John Paul Jones (artist) =

American painter and printmaker (1924–1999)

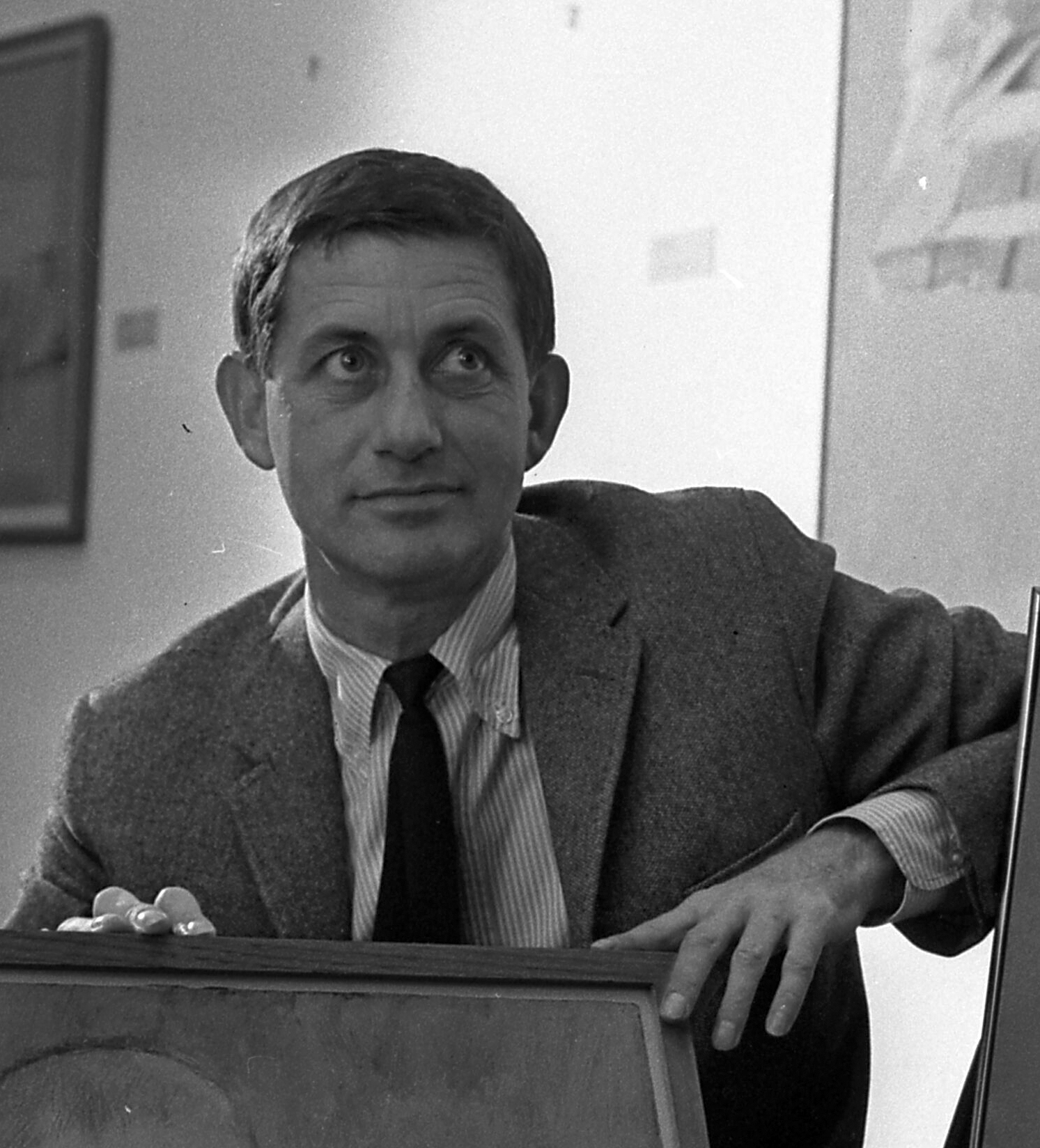
- Born: November 18, 1924; Indianola, Iowa
- Died: September 25, 1999 (aged 74); Ashland, Oregon
- Known for: Painter

John Paul Jones (November 18, 1924 – September 25, 1999) was an American painter and printmaker, described as "one of America's foremost printmakers" in the 1950s and 1960s.

He had a write-up in Time magazine in 1962. In 1963 he had a retrospective exhibition of his prints and drawings at The Brooklyn Museum, New York City. A posthumous retrospective exhibition was held at the Laguna Art Museum, Laguna Beach, in 2010.

Jones was a resident of Laguna Beach, California from the 1960s until 1990.

== Sources ==
- Una E. Johnson, John Paul Jones. Prints and Drawings. 1948-1963, New York, The Brooklyn Museum, 1963.
