= Raven Industries =

American manufacturer of plastic, electronic and "special apparel" products

Raven Industries, Inc.
- Industry: Agriculture
- Founded: February 11, 1956; Sioux Falls, South Dakota, US
- Founder: J.R. Smith; Ed Yost; Duwayne Thon; Joseph Kaliszewki
- Headquarters: Sioux Falls, South Dakota, US
- Area served: Worldwide
- Key people: Daniel A. Rykhus, President & CEO; Steven Brazones, CFO
- Revenue: ▼US$ 378M (2015)
- Operating income: ▼US$ 44M (2015)
- Net income: ▼US$ 32M (2015)
- Total assets: ▲US$ 363M (2015)
- Total equity: ▲US$ 305M (2015)
- Parent: CNH Industrial
- Website: Raven Industries

Raven Industries, Inc. is an American company that makes precision agriculture products and information management tools for growers. Before a series of acquisitions in 2021, it also had an Engineered Films segment that produced plastic films for various agricultural and industrial applications, as well as an Aerostar Industries segment that designed and manufactured high-altitude balloons, tethered aerostats, and radar systems, and sold military parachutes, uniforms, and protective wear. The company was founded in 1956 and headquartered in Sioux Falls, South Dakota. Its stock was traded on Nasdaq until 2021 when it was acquired by CNH Industrial.

== History ==
=== Early years ===
Raven Industries was established in 1956 by James Smith, Paul (Ed) Yost, Duwayne Thon, and Joseph Kaliszewski to build research balloons for the United States Navy. They had worked together under General Mills' aeronautical research division. The company produced polyethylene balloons for high altitudes, from 100,000 to 150,000 feet. It first operated out of the old hospital building at an abandoned World War II airbase. When the Manchester Biscuit Company closed down in 1961, Raven moved into the old Manchester building.

Raven, along with Piccard Balloons and Semco, were among the first manufacturers of hot air balloons that kicked off the resurgence of ballooning in the mid-1960s. In fact, Ed Yost began this series of events when he built and flew a 40 ft (12 m)-diameter balloon a distance of three miles on 22 October 1960. In 1966, Raven added a new 30,000-square-foot facility in Sioux Falls near the airport. According to its website, the first unmanned airship in history to travel in the stratosphere under powered flight was launched and flown by Raven in 1970.

By the 1980s, the company was selling over 200 balloons every year. Ballooning had become so popular that Raven created a subsidiary, Aerostar Industries, to concentrate on the production of balloons. Production of hot air balloons ceased in 2007 however due to the costs for liability insurance and a shrinking market.

=== 21st century ===
The U.S. military and other government agencies were among its clients, and besides the U.S. Department of Defense, Raven Industries had other big name customers such as Google. From 2012 to 2021, its Aerostar subsidiary partnered with Loon LLC, then a subsidiary of Alphabet Inc., to develop high-altitude communications balloons.

In 2019, the United States Southern Command commissioned surveillance tests using 25 Raven balloons across six midwest states. It was unclear whether the tests were connected to any ongoing narcotic or counter-terrorism investigations or how the data collected would be handled afterwards, raising privacy concerns. Funded under project COLD STAR (Covert Long-Dwell Stratospheric Architecture) by the Pentagon, the balloons are radar-transparent and carry a stealthy gondola. They can harvest complex data and navigate using AI. Initially created to locate narcotic traffickers, they were later transitioned into military service. According to Tom Karako, a senior fellow at the Center for Strategic and International Studies, the balloons can serve as communication and datalink nodes, as trucks for intelligence, surveillance and reconnaissance (ISR) to track airborne targets, such as hypersonic missiles, and as platforms for various weapons. The Pentagon believes COLD STAR could refine hypersonic and long-range fire targeting and was evaluating how to incorporate them and commercial satellites into the same "kill chain". Scott Wickersham, Raven Aerostar's vice-president, said that the company was also working with Sierra Nevada, an aerospace defense company, and the Pentagon's research arm DARPA on the Adaptable Lighter-Than-Air (ALTA) program, which aims to make stratospheric balloon navigation more precise and reliable using doppler laser. The technology was transferred to the U.S. military in 2019.

In 2021, Raven was acquired by Case New Holland Industrial (CNHi), the second-largest OEM in the world that designs, manufactures and sells agricultural and construction machinery. What attracted CNHi, who had an annual revenue of $26 billion compared to Raven's $400 million, was the latter's Applied Technology division, which focused on autonomous equipment used in agriculture. Its former Engineered Films division would be acquired by Industrial Opportunity Partners, a private equity firm. Scott Wickersham, who had served as president and general manager of the division, would assume the position of CEO under the new ownership. The stratospheric balloon and radar division, Aerostar, was acquired in 2021 by TCOM Holdings, which specializes in ISR services. Aerostar moved from its downtown headquarters into the former Colorado Technical University building and continue to be led by Jim Nelson.

Following the acquisitions, Raven was restructured to focus on precision agriculture and acquired 48 acres to expand its Innovation Campus near Baltic, South Dakota. It offers products and services such as automated tiller, harvester and spreader, tractor autonomy, data centralization, guidance and steering systems, spray applicators, and electronic displays. The Raven Precision Agriculture Center at the South Dakota State University opened in fall 2021 to support education in agricultural science, technology, and engineering. The company has added hundreds of jobs in Sioux Falls and established a cyber defense hub in collaboration with students and graduates from Dakota State University.

=== Macy's Thanksgiving Day parade ===
From 1984 to 2019, Raven Industries manufactured over 100 balloons and other inflatables for the annual Macy's Thanksgiving Day Parade, depicting different pop culture and cartoon characters such as Snoopy, Garfield, Mickey Mouse, Kermit the Frog, Hello Kitty, Sonic the Hedgehog, Pikachu, Spider-Man, and SpongeBob SquarePants.
