= National Balloon Museum =

Museum in Indianola, Iowa, United States

Coordinates: 41.3763°N 93.5596°W

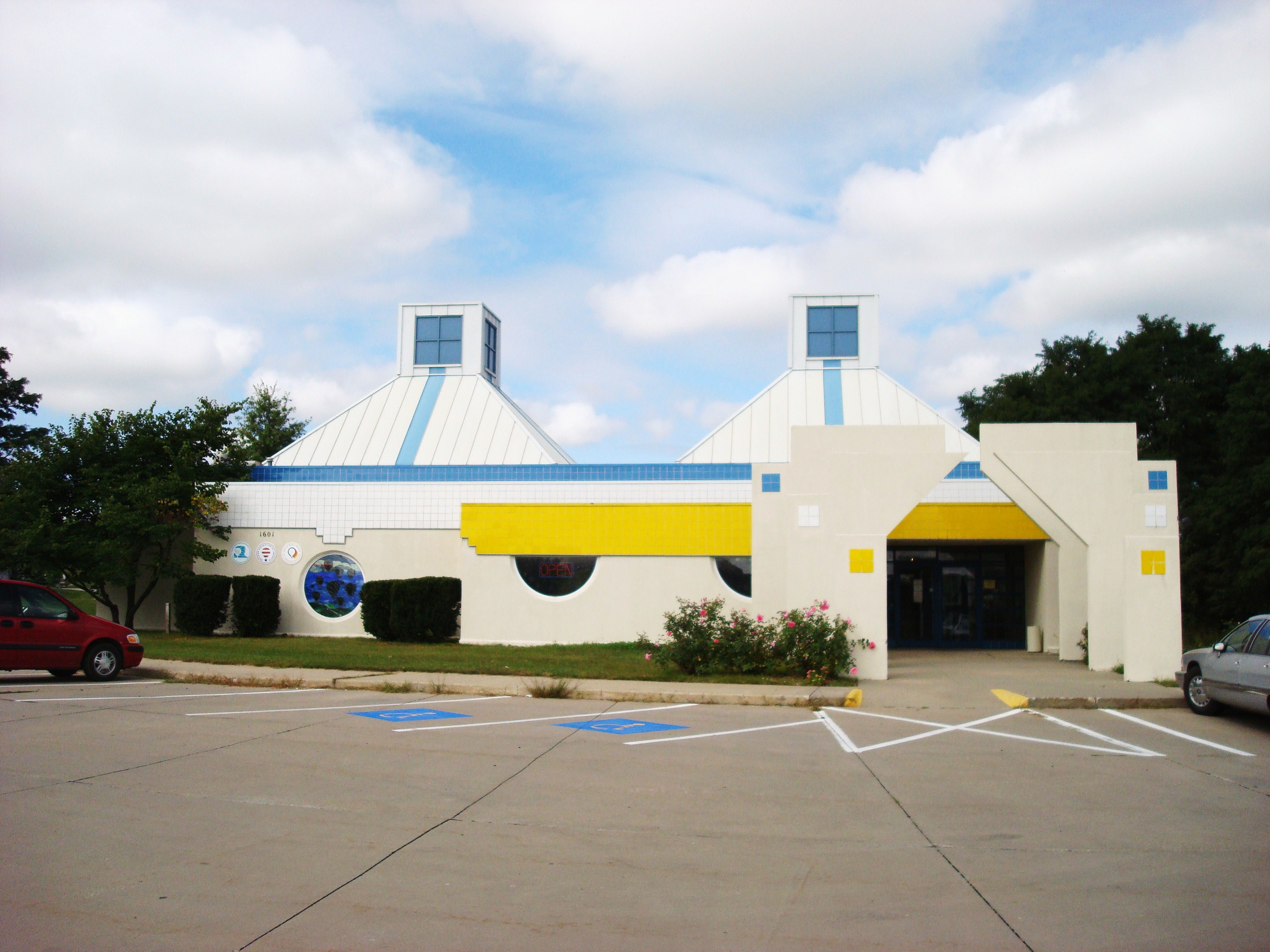
The National Balloon Museum in 2009

The National Balloon Museum is a non-profit museum in Indianola, Iowa, United States. It was founded in 1975 in short term locations, later gaining a permanent location in 1988. All of the museum's exhibits are about hot air ballooning and gas ballooning. The museum is in the shape of a hot air balloon's gondola. There are only two balloon museums within the United States, the other one being the Anderson-Abruzzo Albuquerque International Balloon Museum.

== History ==
The National Hot Air Balloon Championship preliminaries were held in Indianola in 1970. Due to the success of the competition, the championships started happening every year which led to exhibits being created yearly for the competition. However, the exhibits could only be put up temporarily. The short term exhibits created a need for a museum where they can be stored year round. The exhibits are from the Balloon Federation of America, covering over 200 years of history. Included in the museum's collection is the first hot air balloon that crossed the English Channel. Located within the museum is the U.S. Ballooning Hall of Fame, a children's area and a library. The children's area has photo shoots and books about ballooning.

All of the museum's workers are volunteers. 24,000 people visit the museum each year, with the visitors coming from twenty countries. The museum has hosted a nine day long festival, titled the National Balloon Classic, yearly in late July since 1989. A large donation was received to continue the museum's operation in 2015. The donation was left in a will and was in a large unspecified amount.

In the early morning of March 29, 2024, a fire erupted inside the museum, delaying the museum's planned reopening of April 6. The fire's origin is unknown, but the building was found not up to code, having no sprinklers or alarm systems. Many irreplaceable artifacts were destroyed.

== U.S. Ballooning Hall of Fame ==
The U.S. Ballooning Hall of Fame "recognizes persons who have contributed in significant ways to the sport and or development of Ballooning."

The following persons have been inducted into the Hall of Fame:

- 2004: Paul E. (Ed) Yost
- 2005: Don N. Kersten, Sidney D. Cutter
- 2006: Bruce Comstock, Peter Pellegrino
- 2007: Deke Sonnichsen, Malcolm Stevenson Forbes
- 2008: Tracy Barnes, Eddie Allen
- 2009: Jim Winker, Lucy Luck Stefan, Karl H. Stefan
- 2010: Anthony M. Fairbanks, Joseph W. Kittinger, Jr., Thomas A.F. Sheppard
- 2011: Ben L. Abruzzo, Maxie Anderson, Dewey Reinhard
- 2012: Carol Rymer Davis, Dr. William Grabb, Matt Wiederkehr
- 2013: Dennis E. Floden, William Murtorff, Dr. Clayton Lay Thomas
- 2014: Nikki Caplan, Chauncey Dunn, Don Piccard
- 2015: Robert Dodds Meddock, Jr., Constance C. Wolf
- 2016: Troy Bradley, Bill Bussey, Bob Sparks
- 2017: David Levin, Steve Fossett, Thaddeus Lowe
- 2018: Debbra Spaeth, Alan Blount, Ward Van Orman
- 2019: Eleanor Vadala, Jim Birk—McAllen, Nick Saum
- 2020: Coy Foster, Mark Sullivan
