= Balloon Museum =

Travelling visual arts exhibition

- Established: 2021
- Location: Global touring Tin Building, Seaport, New York City (Permanent Flagship)
- Type: Contemporary art, experiential art
- Owner: Lux Entertainment
- Website: balloonmuseum.world

The Balloon Museum is an international exhibition brand focusing on inflatable and air-based contemporary art. Conceived and produced by Rome-based Lux Entertainment, the exhibition debuted in Italy in 2021 and has since toured 23 major cities across Europe, North America, and Asia, attracting over 8 million visitors worldwide.

While maintaining its global travelling editions, the museum established its first permanent United States flagship venue at the historic Tin Building in the Seaport district of New York City, opening on July 15, 2026. The inaugural permanent exhibition is titled "DAYDREAM, AIR BECOMES ART" and features monumental, site-specific works by international artists including Marina Abramović, Martin Creed, Alex Schweder, Boris Acket, and Valerio Berruti.

Editions include Pop Air, which premiered in Rome and toured to Paris, Milan, and Madrid; Let's Fly, which has been staged in New York City, Miami, Austin, and Los Angeles; EmotionAir, presented in London and San Francisco; and Euphoria, which opened at the Grand Palais in Paris in June 2025.

== History ==
=== Global touring editions (2021–present) ===
The Balloon Museum was conceived as a travelling contemporary art exhibition, debuting in Rome, Italy, in 2021 with its inaugural concept, "Pop Air." Between 2021 and 2026, the exhibition expanded its global itinerary under Lux Entertainment, launching specialized thematic editions such as "Let's Fly," "EmotionAir," and "Euphoria." These mobile iterations toured major international cultural hubs across Europe, North America, and Asia—including Paris, Milan, Madrid, London, Miami, Los Angeles, and San Francisco—drawing over 8 million visitors worldwide.

=== First permanent exhibition in New York City (2026) ===
While maintaining its international touring schedule, the brand established its first permanent exhibition space in the United States. On July 15, 2026, the Balloon Museum opened this permanent flagship venue at the historic Tin Building in the Seaport district of Lower Manhattan. The permanent site was inaugurated with the exhibition "DAYDREAM, AIR BECOMES ART," featuring large-scale, site-specific installations tailored to the architectural space of the Tin Building.

== Description ==
Installations combine inflatable sculptures with light, mirrors, and sound to create interactive environments. The shows have been described as an “immersive universe”.

In France, shows in Paris have received positive reviews. In other European countries such as Spain and the United Kingdom, Balloon Museum has also been positively received.

Several other similar exhibitions have also been developed by Lux Entertainment. This Is Wonderland is an immersive theatrical installation in Rome that combines fairytale narratives with live performances. The Color Hotel has operated as an interactive venue in Fiumicino since December 2023. The Flat by Macan was a collaboration with Porsche Italia, staged in Milan in 2024, while Christmas World is a seasonal event at Villa Borghese in Rome.

== Artists ==
The Balloon Museum collaborates with international contemporary artists, collectives, and design studios specialized in inflatable, kinetic, and experiential art. Artists featured across various editions and the permanent New York City flagship include:

- Marina Abramović
- Paola Pivi
- Philippe Parreno
- Boris Acket
- Valerio Berruti
- Carsten Höller
- Cyril Lancelin
- Filthy Luker
- Motorefisico
- Quiet Ensemble
- Karina Smigla-Bobinski
- ENESS
- Pepper's Ghost
- Pneuhaus

The permanent site's inaugural exhibition, "DAYDREAM," specifically highlighted large-scale contributions from Abramović, Acket, and Berruti, curated to interact with the architecture of the venue.

== See also ==
- Installation art
