= Ed Yost =

American balloonist inventor

- Born: Paul Edward Yost; June 30, 1919; Bristow, Iowa, US
- Died: May 27, 2007 (aged 87); Vadito, New Mexico, US
- Occupation: Inventor
- Employer(s): Raven Industries; General Mills
- Known for: Ballooning
- Notable work: Inventor of the modern hot air balloon

Paul Edward Yost (June 30, 1919 – May 27, 2007) was the American inventor of the modern hot air balloon and is referred to as the "Father of the Modern Day Hot-Air Balloon." He worked for a high-altitude research division of General Mills in the early 1950s until he left to establish Raven Industries in 1956, along with several colleagues from General Mills.

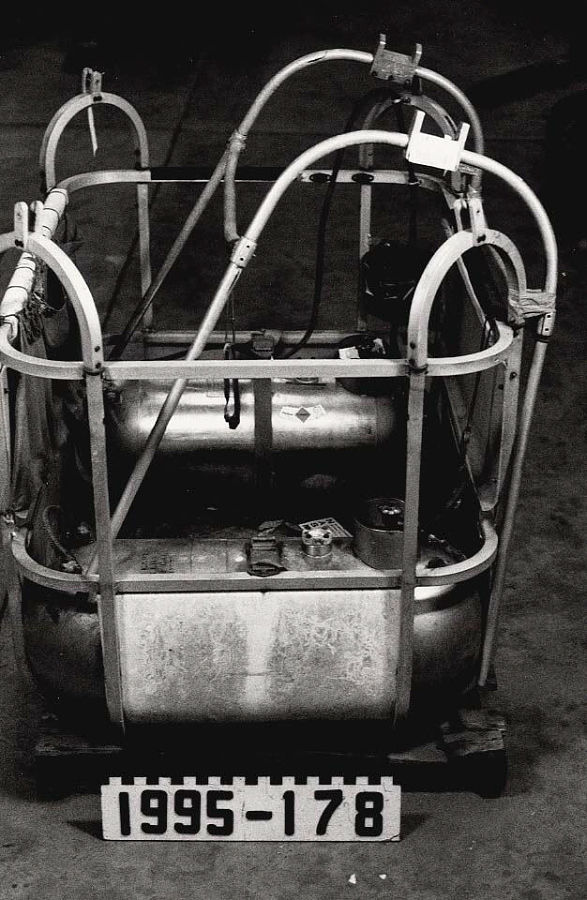
Raven Industries hot air sport balloons was founded in 1956, in Sioux Falls, SD

== Inventor ==
Born on a farm seven miles south of Bristow, Iowa, to Charles L. Yost and Fleta Ferne Burman Yost, Paul Edward Yost first became involved in lighter-than-air ballooning when he leased his single-engine plane to General Mills to track their gas balloons. He became a senior engineer in the development of high-altitude research balloons.

In the 1950s, Yost's own interests turned toward reviving the lost practice of manned hot-air ballooning. This technology had first been invented in France in the late 18th century by pioneers led by the Montgolfier brothers, but under the Montgolfier system, the balloon's air was heated by a ground fire prior to the balloon being released. The inherent danger of this type of balloon flight led to the system being abandoned when hydrogen and later helium became available.

One of Yost's key engineering insights was that a hot-air balloon could be made to carry its own fuel. The invention of relatively light burners fueled by bottled propane made it possible for the balloonist to re-heat the air inside the balloon for a longer flight. Yost’s invention improved modern hot-air balloons into semi-maneuverable aircraft. Yost patented further refinements he made to the hot-air balloon, including nonporous synthetic fabrics, maneuvering vents, and deflation systems for landing. Yost also designed the distinctive “teardrop” shape of the hot air balloon envelope itself.

== Aviator ==
In October 1955, Yost developed and flew the first prototype of the modern hot-air balloon in a tethered flight. The envelope was plastic film, and heat was provided by burning kerosene. This prototype flight uncovered conceptual flaws that Yost worked to overcome.

Raven Industries pioneered hot air balloons manufacturing. Raven was founded in 1956 by Paul Edward Yost, J. R. Smith, Joseph Kaliszewski, and Dwayne Thon, while working in the General Mills scientific balloon program. Headquartered in Sioux Falls, SD; Raven was contracted by the US Navy's Office of Naval Research (ONR) to create a reusable, lightweight balloon that would carry a pilot to 10,000 feet and fly for three hours. Yost made the first tethered flight in October 1955. The envelope was plastic film used in gas balloons and heat from plumber’s pots burning kerosene. Yost remained aloft for 25 minutes and traveled three miles from the takeoff point.

On October 22, 1960, Yost lifted off from Bruning, Nebraska, on the first-ever free flight of a modern hot-air balloon. His balloon flew untethered for 1 hour and 35 minutes with the aid of heat generated by a propane burner. The balloon's 40 ft (12 m)-diameter envelope was sewn from heat-resistant fabric especially selected by Yost for the purpose. In November 1960, Yost made a second flight with an improved balloon from the famed Stratobowl, near Rapid City, South Dakota.

Raven Industries sold their first civilian hot air balloon in November 1961, launching a new sport in the process. The Raven Vulcoon balloon, model S50A, with a basket constructed of aluminum tubing and fiberglass panels was the first hot air balloon to receive an airworthiness certificate from the Federal Aviation Administration. Registration number N1960R was manufactured in May 1972 and first flown on June 11 of that year. Its balloon envelope had a capacity of 56,500 cubic feet, an empty weight of 325 pounds, and a maximum gross lifting capacity of 1400 pounds. For its entire career, the balloon was owned and operated by the Tewksbury Balloon Club, Fairmont, New Jersey.

On April 13, 1963, after further refining and improving on his designs and materials, Yost piloted the first modern hot air balloon across the English Channel with fellow balloonist Don Piccard in a balloon later named the “Channel Champ.”

In 1976, Yost set 13 aviation world records for distance traveled and amount of time aloft in his attempt to cross the Atlantic Ocean —solo— by balloon. He designed and built his balloon, the “Silver Fox," himself, partly in his home garage. It featured a gondola that was shaped like a boat in the event that he would be forced down at sea — which is precisely what occurred. Although he had traveled far in excess of the distance needed to reach Europe from his launch point off the coast of Maine, his flight path began to point south rather than the hoped-for east direction due to inaccurate weather forecasting. The dream was achieved two years later with Yost’s assistance in a Yost-built balloon, Double Eagle II.

Yost also contributed to the advancement of the sport of ballooning and lighter-than-air flight. He helped to found the Balloon Federation of America (BFA) and assisted in the organization of the first U.S. National Ballooning Championship in Indianola, Iowa.

Yost founded the Balloon Historical Society (BHS) in 2002, which dedicated four monuments on the rim of the Stratobowl on July 28, 2004, to memorialize the Stratobowl projects in the 1930s as well as the second flight of a modern hot-air balloon.

On May 27, 2007, Yost died of a heart attack at the age of 87 at his home in Vadito, near Taos, New Mexico. He was buried in the Allison cemetery in Allison, Iowa.
