= National Balloon Classic =

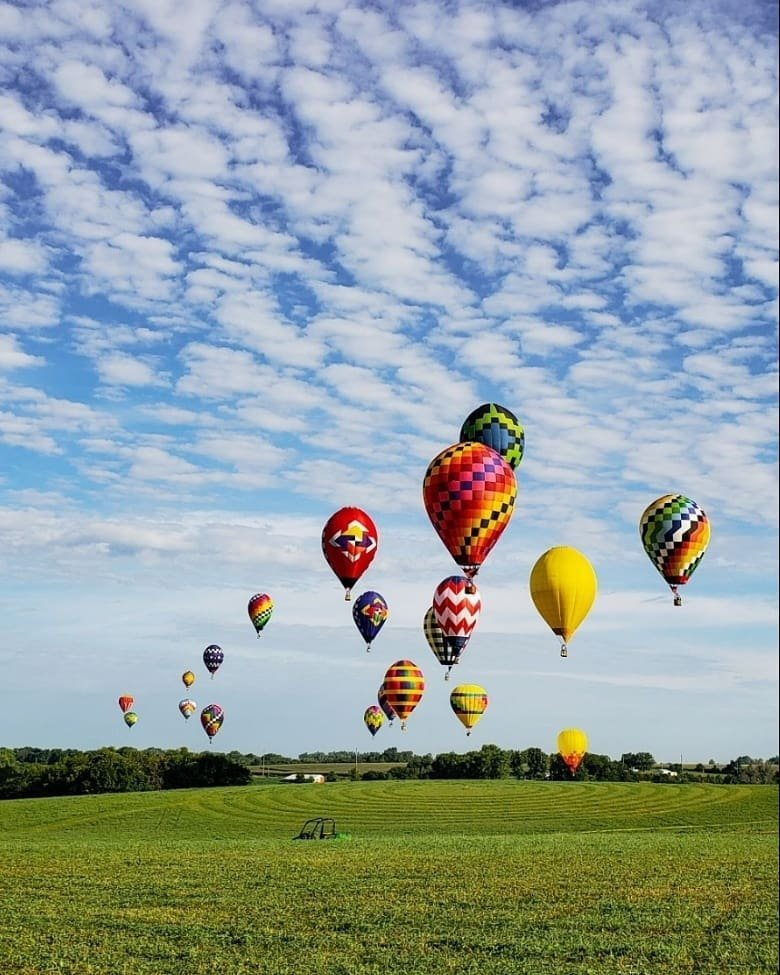
- Balloons taking to the skies at the festival
- Genre: Hot air balloon festival
- Dates: First week of August
- Locations: Memorial Balloon Field; 15335 Jewell Street; Indianola, Iowa 50125
- Founded: 1989
- Website: nationalballoonclassic.com

The National Balloon Classic is an annual hot air balloon festival held at the Memorial Balloon Field in Indianola, Iowa. The classic is a nine-day event with nearly 100 hot air balloons.

== History ==
In 1970, the fifth United States National Hot Air Balloon Championship held the primaries in Indianola and due to the success of the competition it hosted the championships for the following 18 years. In 1989, when the competition moved to Baton Rouge, Louisiana the National Balloon Classic was started and has continued every year except 2020, when the COVID-19 pandemic caused officials to scrap the event. The 32nd was deferred to 2021.

== Events ==
- U.S. Ballooning Hall of Fame Induction Ceremony at the National Balloon Museum.
- Nite Glow
- Dawn Patrol

== Location ==
The Classic is held at Memorial Balloon Field.

== See also ==
- Hot Air Balloon Festivals
