= Indianola, Iowa =

- City
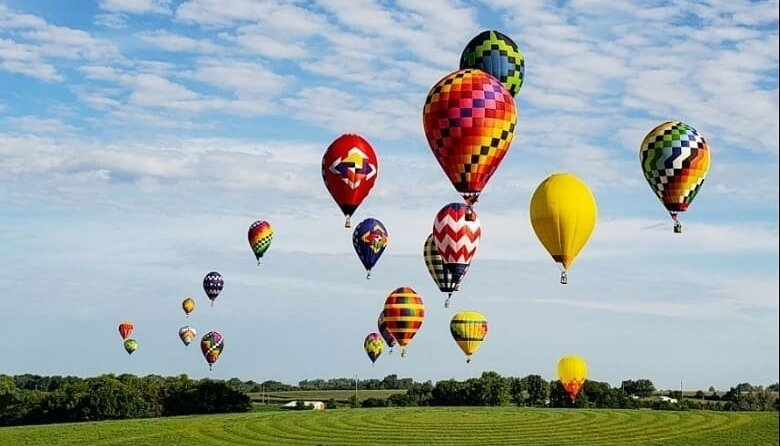
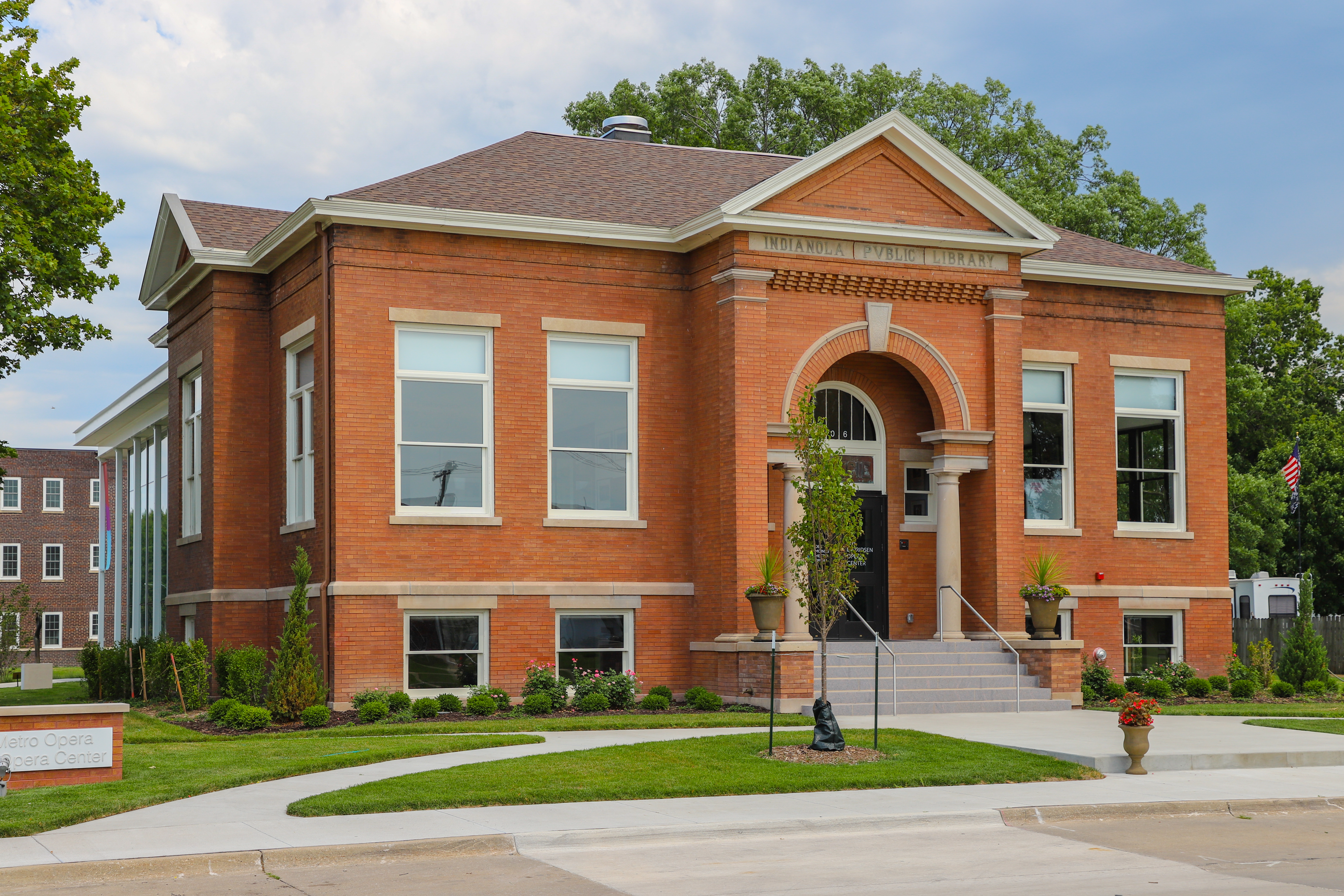
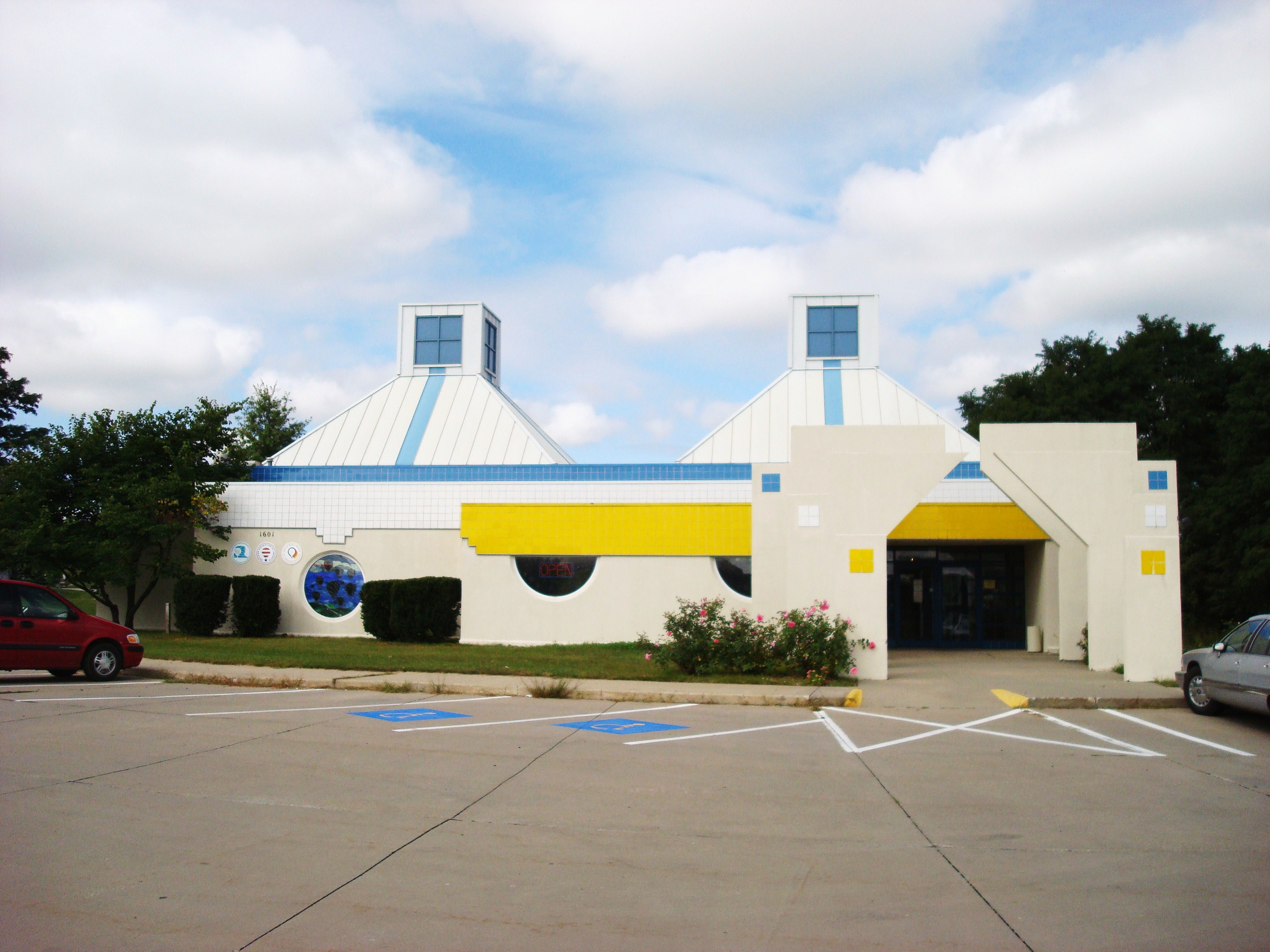
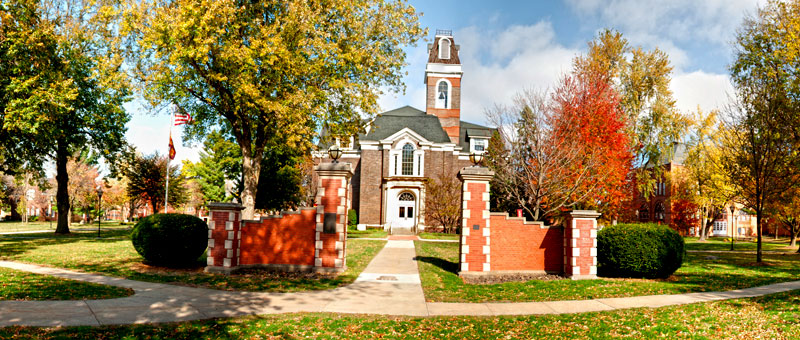
- National Balloon Classic Indianola Carnegie Library National Balloon Museum Simpson College

- Location of Indianola, Iowa

- Location in the United States
- Coordinates: 41°22′20″N 93°33′48″W
- Country: United States
- State: Iowa
- County: Warren

Government
  - Type: Mayor–council

Area
  - Total: 11.44 sq mi (29.62 km^{2})
  - Land: 11.44 sq mi (29.62 km^{2})
  - Water: 0 sq mi (0.00 km^{2})
- Elevation: 958 ft (292 m)

Population (2020)
  - Total: 15,833
  - Density: 1,385/sq mi (534.6/km^{2})
- Time zone: UTC-6 (Central (CST))
  - Summer (DST): UTC-5 (CDT)
- ZIP code: 50125
- Area code: 515
- FIPS code: 69-38280
- GNIS feature ID: 468071
- Website: www.indianolaiowa.gov

Indianola is a city in and the county seat of Warren County, Iowa, United States, located 19 miles (31 km) south of downtown Des Moines. The population was 15,833 at the time of the 2020 census. Indianola is home to the National Balloon Classic, a nine-day hot air balloon festival held annually in the summer, the Des Moines Metro Opera, a major American Summer Opera Festival, and Simpson College.

== History ==
Indianola was founded in 1849 as the county seat of Warren County. The town was located near the geographic center of the new county. The town's name was taken from a newspaper account of a Texas ghost town of the same name.

Indianola was incorporated in 1863 during the Civil War.

== Geography ==
According to the United States Census Bureau, the city has a total area of 11.25 square miles (29.14 km^{2}), all land. The Summerset Trail's southern terminus is in Indianola.

=== Climate ===
According to the Köppen climate classification system, Indianola has a hot-summer humid continental climate, abbreviated "Dfa" on climate maps.

Climate data for Indianola, Iowa, 1991–2020 normals, extremes 1893–present
Month	Jan	Feb	Mar	Apr	May	Jun	Jul	Aug	Sep	Oct	Nov	Dec	Year
Record high °F (°C)	70 (21)	79 (26)	89 (32)	92 (33)	106 (41)	105 (41)	112 (44)	113 (45)	104 (40)	95 (35)	82 (28)	70 (21)	113 (45)
Mean maximum °F (°C)	54.9 (12.7)	59.0 (15.0)	74.3 (23.5)	82.7 (28.2)	88.0 (31.1)	91.5 (33.1)	94.5 (34.7)	93.4 (34.1)	90.4 (32.4)	84.6 (29.2)	70.9 (21.6)	58.6 (14.8)	96.0 (35.6)
Mean daily maximum °F (°C)	31.7 (−0.2)	36.3 (2.4)	49.5 (9.7)	62.1 (16.7)	71.9 (22.2)	81.4 (27.4)	85.5 (29.7)	84.0 (28.9)	77.6 (25.3)	64.8 (18.2)	49.6 (9.8)	36.9 (2.7)	60.9 (16.1)
Daily mean °F (°C)	21.7 (−5.7)	25.8 (−3.4)	38.3 (3.5)	50.0 (10.0)	60.9 (16.1)	70.7 (21.5)	74.7 (23.7)	72.8 (22.7)	65.0 (18.3)	52.5 (11.4)	38.8 (3.8)	27.1 (−2.7)	49.9 (9.9)
Mean daily minimum °F (°C)	11.6 (−11.3)	15.2 (−9.3)	27.1 (−2.7)	37.9 (3.3)	49.9 (9.9)	60.0 (15.6)	64.0 (17.8)	61.6 (16.4)	52.4 (11.3)	40.1 (4.5)	27.9 (−2.3)	17.4 (−8.1)	38.8 (3.8)
Mean minimum °F (°C)	−11.7 (−24.3)	−6.4 (−21.3)	7.0 (−13.9)	22.3 (−5.4)	34.7 (1.5)	46.5 (8.1)	53.5 (11.9)	51.1 (10.6)	36.5 (2.5)	23.8 (−4.6)	10.1 (−12.2)	−3.3 (−19.6)	−16.1 (−26.7)
Record low °F (°C)	−33 (−36)	−35 (−37)	−20 (−29)	−2 (−19)	21 (−6)	36 (2)	40 (4)	38 (3)	23 (−5)	4 (−16)	−11 (−24)	−26 (−32)	−35 (−37)
Average precipitation inches (mm)	0.91 (23)	1.42 (36)	1.94 (49)	3.88 (99)	5.58 (142)	5.72 (145)	4.32 (110)	3.90 (99)	3.86 (98)	3.02 (77)	1.85 (47)	1.40 (36)	37.8 (961)
Average snowfall inches (cm)	8.5 (22)	8.2 (21)	3.7 (9.4)	1.0 (2.5)	0.3 (0.76)	0.0 (0.0)	0.0 (0.0)	0.0 (0.0)	0.0 (0.0)	0.5 (1.3)	1.9 (4.8)	6.7 (17)	30.8 (78.76)
Average precipitation days (≥ 0.01 in)	5.1	6.6	7.3	10.0	12.3	11.0	8.0	8.9	7.6	7.7	6.0	5.8	96.3
Average snowy days (≥ 0.1 in)	3.7	3.9	1.7	0.6	0.1	0.0	0.0	0.0	0.0	0.4	0.9	3.2	14.5
Source 1: NOAA
Source 2: National Weather Service

== Demographics ==
Historical population
Year	Pop.	±%
1860	836	—
1870	1,428	+70.8%
1880	2,146	+50.3%
1890	2,254	+5.0%
1900	3,261	+44.7%
1910	3,283	+0.7%
1920	3,628	+10.5%
1930	3,488	−3.9%
1940	4,123	+18.2%
1950	5,145	+24.8%
1960	7,062	+37.3%
1970	8,852	+25.3%
1980	10,843	+22.5%
1990	11,340	+4.6%
2000	12,998	+14.6%
2010	14,782	+13.7%
2020	15,833	+7.1%
Source: "U.S. Census website". United States Census Bureau. Source: U.S. Decennial Census

=== 2020 census ===
As of the 2020 census, Indianola had a population of 15,833, with 5,886 households and 3,886 families residing in the city. The population density was 1,398.9 inhabitants per square mile (540.1/km^{2}). There were 6,409 housing units at an average density of 566.3 per square mile (218.6/km^{2}). 96.9% of residents lived in urban areas, while 3.1% lived in rural areas.

Of the 5,886 households, 32.3% had children under the age of 18 living with them; 50.2% were married couples living together; 6.5% were cohabiting-couple households; 27.0% had a female householder with no spouse or partner present; and 16.3% had a male householder with no spouse or partner present. 34.0% of all households were non-families, 29.0% were made up of individuals, and 13.3% had someone living alone who was 65 years old or older. Of all housing units, 8.2% were vacant. The homeowner vacancy rate was 1.5% and the rental vacancy rate was 12.7%.

The median age in the city was 36.0 years. 28.5% of residents were under the age of 20; 8.5% were between the ages of 20 and 24; 23.0% were from 25 to 44; 21.4% were from 45 to 64; and 18.6% were 65 years of age or older. 23.9% of residents were under the age of 18. The gender makeup of the city was 47.6% male and 52.4% female. For every 100 females there were 91.0 males, and for every 100 females age 18 and over there were 88.5 males age 18 and over.

Racial composition as of the 2020 census
Race	Number	Percent
White	14,693	92.8%
Black or African American	153	1.0%
American Indian and Alaska Native	33	0.2%
Asian	112	0.7%
Native Hawaiian and Other Pacific Islander	11	0.1%
Some other race	105	0.7%
Two or more races	726	4.6%
Hispanic or Latino (of any race)	438	2.8%

=== Other census counts ===
In 2005, a special census was conducted that revised Indianola's population to 14,156.

=== 2000 census ===
At the 2000 census there were 12,998 people, 4,748 households, and 3,261 families living in the city. The population density was 1,414.7 inhabitants per square mile (546.2/km^{2}). There were 4,981 housing units at an average density of 542.1/sq mi (209.3/km^{2}). The racial makeup of the city was 97.92% White, 0.40% African American, 0.15% Native American, 0.51% Asian, 0.07% Pacific Islander, 0.18% from other races, and 0.78% from two or more races. Hispanic or Latino of any race were 0.85%.

Of the 4,748 households 34.2% had children under the age of 18 living with them, 55.2% were married couples living together, 10.2% had a female householder with no husband present, and 31.3% were non-families. 26.5% of households were one person and 12.3% were one person aged 65 or older. The average household size was 2.44 and the average family size was 2.94.

The age distribution was 23.8% under the age of 18, 15.8% from 18 to 24, 25.3% from 25 to 44, 19.8% from 45 to 64, and 15.4% 65 or older. The median age was 34 years. For every 100 females, there were 89.1 males. For every 100 females age 18 and over, there were 85.9 males.

The median household income was $43,725 and the median family income was $52,238. Males had a median income of $36,945 versus $24,401 for females. The per capita income for the city was $19,574. About 5.6% of families and 7.2% of the population were below the poverty line, including 9.3% of those under age 18 and 5.9% of those age 65 or over.

=== Religion ===
21.%-Catholic

64.5%-Protestant

14.1%-non affiliated

.4%- Karen Buddhist, (in 2022 a Karen Buddhist temple was established at the old St Thomas A. Catholic Church site)

== Current elected officials ==
City Council:

Position	Name	Term expires
Mayor	Steve Richardson	2025
City Council Ward 1	Melissa Sones	2027
City Council Ward 2	Ron Dalby	2025
City Council Ward 3	Steve Armstrong	2027
City Council Ward 4	Christina Beach	2025
City Council At-Large	Josh Rabe	2027
City Council At-Large	Vacant	2025

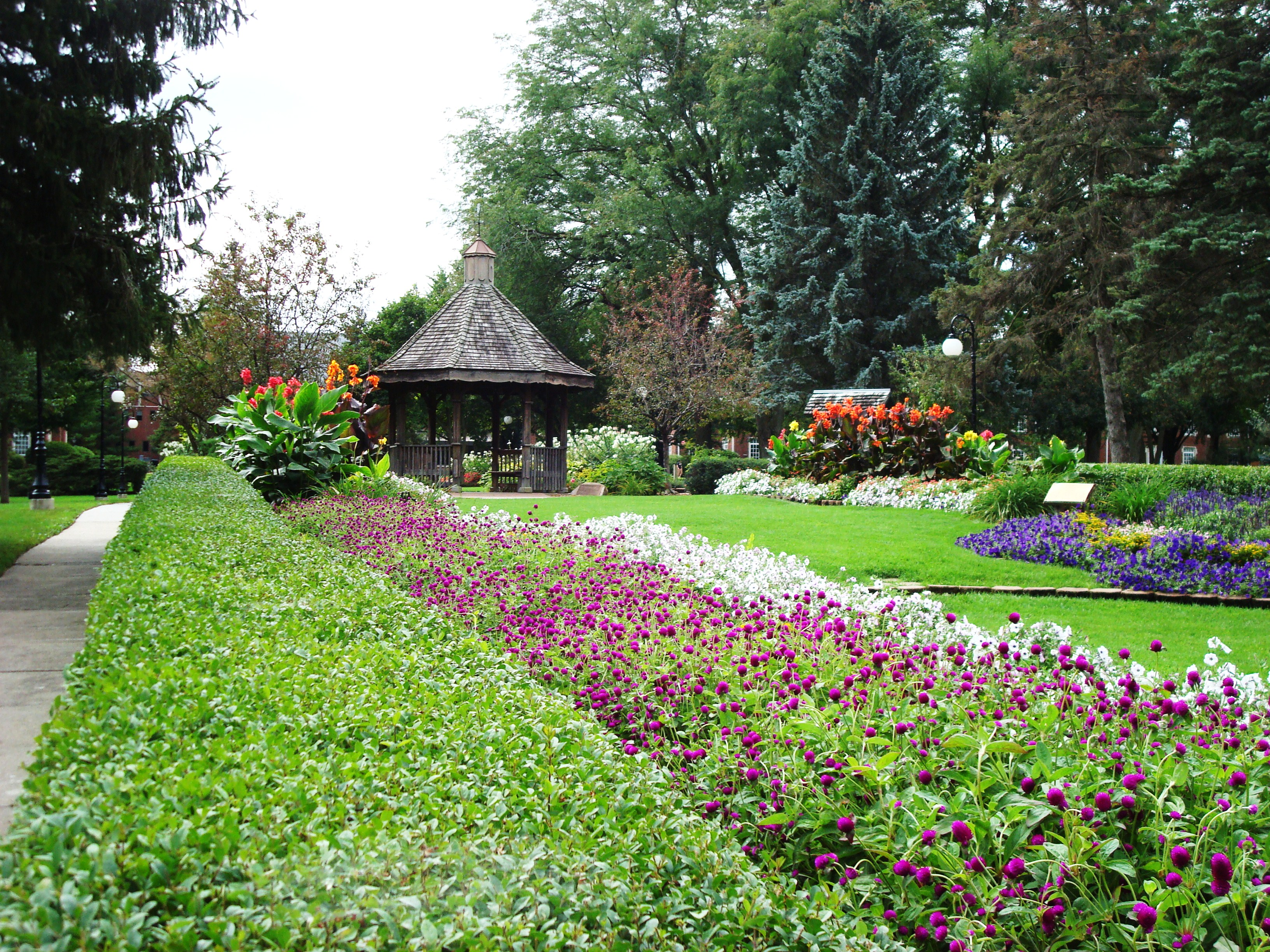
Gazebo and flower gardens in Buxton Park Arboretum

== Arts and culture ==
Indianola is also the home of the National Balloon Classic and National Balloon Museum.

=== Points of interest ===
- Buxton Park Arboretum
- Des Moines Metro Opera
- Summerset Winery
- Simpson College
- U.S. Ballooning Hall of Fame

== Education ==
=== Public school system ===
Indianola is served by the Indianola Community School District.

Indianola has four elementary schools:

- Whittier Elementary
- Emerson Elementary
- Irving Elementary
- Wilder Elementary

Indianola Middle School is the only middle school.
Indianola High School is the only senior high school.

=== Colleges and universities ===
Simpson College, a liberal arts college of the United Methodist Church, is in Indianola, and was founded in 1860.

== Infrastructure ==
=== Transportation ===
==== Highways ====
Iowa Highway 92 runs east and west through the city and crosses US Highways 65 and 69 southeast of the central business district.

==== Railroads ====
Indianola no longer has railroad service. At one time, it served as a terminus for a branch line of the Chicago, Burlington and Quincy Railroad which came off the CB&Q mainline at Indianola Junction, which was four miles west of Chariton. There was a brick and stucco depot that stood across the tracks from the Rock Island depot. This line was abandoned in the early 1960s.

The other railroad was the Chicago, Rock Island and Pacific Railroad, which branched off a branch line from Carlisle, which is just southeast of Des Moines, to Summerset Junction, a few miles north of Indianola and on into Winterset. The Winterset to Summerset Junction portion of the line was discontinued in the early 1960s, leaving the Indianola to Carlisle line in place. There was a brick Rock Island depot just to the west of US Highway 65 & 69 in the center of Indianola. This line maintained sporadic service until the Rock Island went bankrupt in 1980. The line was then operated by the Chicago and Northwestern Railroad until the early 1990s, at which point the line was abandoned back to Carlisle. The line was converted to the Summerset Trail from Indianola to Carlisle after abandonment.

The Rock Island and CB&Q lines both came in from the east and paralleled each other as they came into Indianola. They could interchange cars and there was at one point, first class Pullman passenger trains came down the Rock Island and then moved to the CB&Q railroad to Chariton and on to St. Joseph, Missouri. The Rock Island purchased a portion of the CB&Q after it was abandoned. Freight cars were sometimes stored there.

==== Air service ====
Scheduled passenger service and general aviation services are provided by Des Moines International Airport, which is 13 miles northwest of Indianola. There are two privately owned airports near Indianola: Nash Field is four miles south of Indianola and is open to the public. Laverty Field is three miles north of Indianola and requires prior permission to land.

== Notable people ==
- Mary Alice Barton (1917–2003), American quilter, quilt historian, collector, and philanthropist
- Casey Blake, baseball player and assistant coach
- Todd Blythe, former football player
- Dayton Duncan, writer and documentary filmmaker
- Junior D. Edwards, posthumous Medal of Honor honoree
- Erasmus Haworth, geologist
- James C. Hickman, actuary
- Paul Homan (1893–1969), economist
- John Paul Jones, painter
- Lane Sisters, four sibling singers, including film actress Priscilla Lane (1915–1995)
- Ralph Parcaut, wrestler
- Steve Spray, golfer
- Chris Street, Iowa Hawkeye basketball player
- Edwin Edgar Voigt, bishop of the Methodist Church
- Ilo Browne Wallace, Second Lady of the United States, wife of Vice President Henry A. Wallace
- Ed Yost, inventor of the modern hot air balloon

== Technology ==
- Indianola has a municipal, Gigabit-capable, fiber optic network and entrepreneurial development programs that links STEM-related activities at its schools and Simpson College to the local tech economy.
