= Balloon fiesta =

Balloon Fiesta may refer to the following:

- Albuquerque International Balloon Fiesta
- Bristol International Balloon Fiesta
- Philippine International Hot Air Balloon Fiesta
- Saga International Balloon Fiesta (in Japan)
- Saxonia International Balloon Fiesta

For a complete list of balloon festivals, see Hot air balloon festival.
