= Nepal International Balloon Festival =

The Nepal International Balloon Festival is a balloon festival that was organised for the first time in Pokhara, Nepal, in 2024. Participants from around 24 countries including the United States, Brazil, United Kingdom, Japan and South Korea joined in the event. It was held from December 24, 2004, to January 1, 2025.

== See also ==
- List of hot air balloon festivals
