= Tornado (Wisdom ride) =

Amusement ride

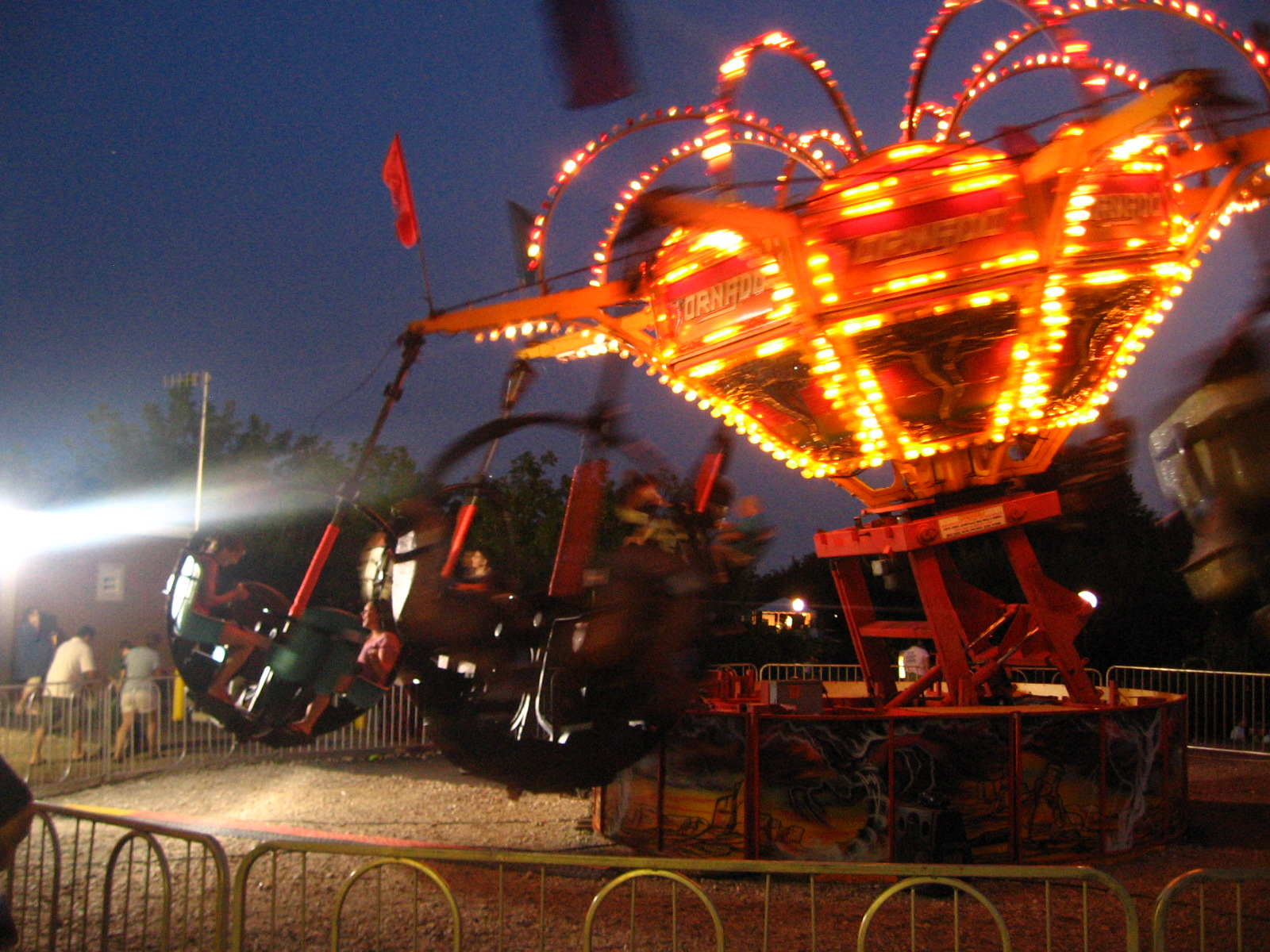
The traveling Tornado at the Great Falls Balloon Festival in Lewiston, Maine

The Tornado is an amusement ride manufactured by Wisdom Industries Ltd. Most Tornadoes travel with a traveling midway company to many fairs with many other rides.

== Ride experience ==
The center base spins at 14 RPM while each car can be spun by the riders. Then, the ride tilts at a 24-degree angle, while spinning.

== Incidents ==
On March 29, 2003, a Tornado ride collapsed, injuring 4 children, at the Lehigh Spring Festival in Lehigh Acres, Florida. Witnesses say that one of the gondolas clipped the ground, causing the central column to break off its axis. The ride was the second in a chain of accidents on the Midwest Midways traveling carnival.

In 2006, two children each suffered a broken arm at the Clark County Fair when riding a Tornado ride operated by Butler Amusements.
