= Ferrara Balloons Festival =

Hot air balloon festival in Ferrara, Italy

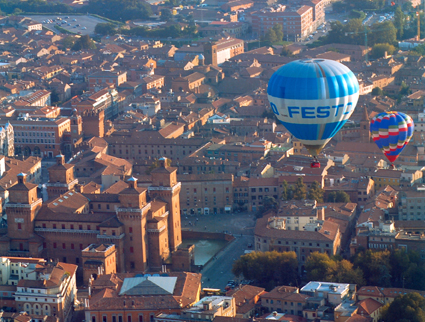
Flying above the Ancient Castle during the Ferrara Balloons Festival

The Ferrara Balloon Festival is an annual hot air balloon festival held in Ferrara, Italy. It is regarded as one of the most prominent events of its kind in Europe, attracting numerous teams from both Italy and abroad, featuring traditional and uniquely shaped balloons. The festival typically lasts for ten days.

First held in 2005, one of its highlights is the mass ascent of balloons from the Bassani Urban Park, located just outside the Renaissance city walls of this UNESCO World Heritage Site.

Organized by the Ferrara City Council and the Provincial Administration, the event also includes concerts, shows, entertainment, and the "Village of the Air," which features attractions, shops, and food stalls.

The festival was not held in 2020.

== See also ==
- Hot air balloon festivals
