= Colorado Balloon Classic =

Hot air balloon festival in Colorado, US

Coordinates: 38°49′47″N 104°47′55″W

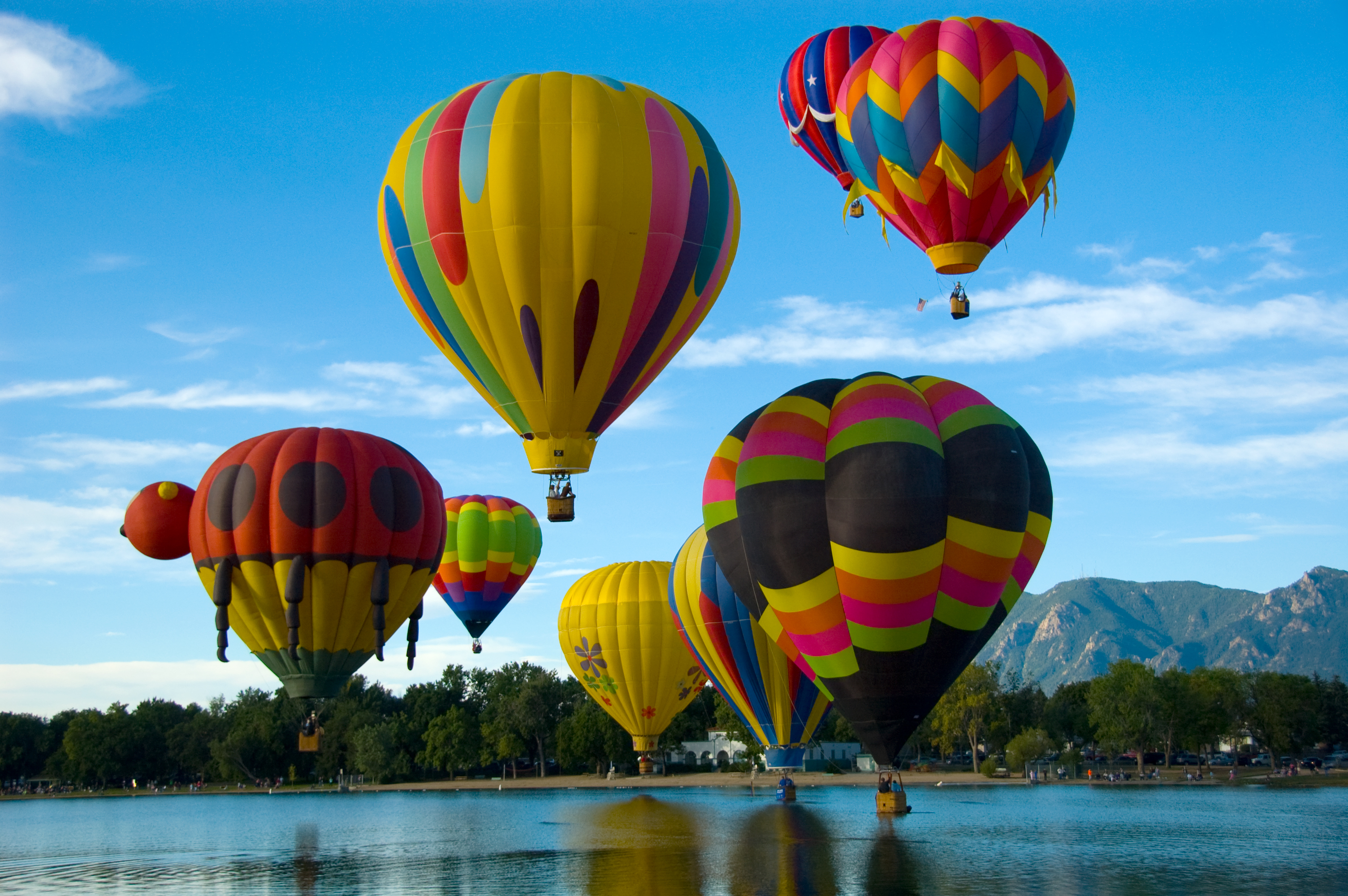
The 2008 hot air balloon competition, overlooking Prospect Lake

The Colorado Springs Labor Day Lift Off (formerly the Colorado Balloon Classic) is a hot air balloon festival in Colorado Springs. Held each Labor Day weekend since 1977, it takes place near Prospect Lake in Memorial Park. It is the "largest and the longest continuously running hot air balloon festival in the Rocky Mountain region as well as the state of Colorado".

== Gallery ==
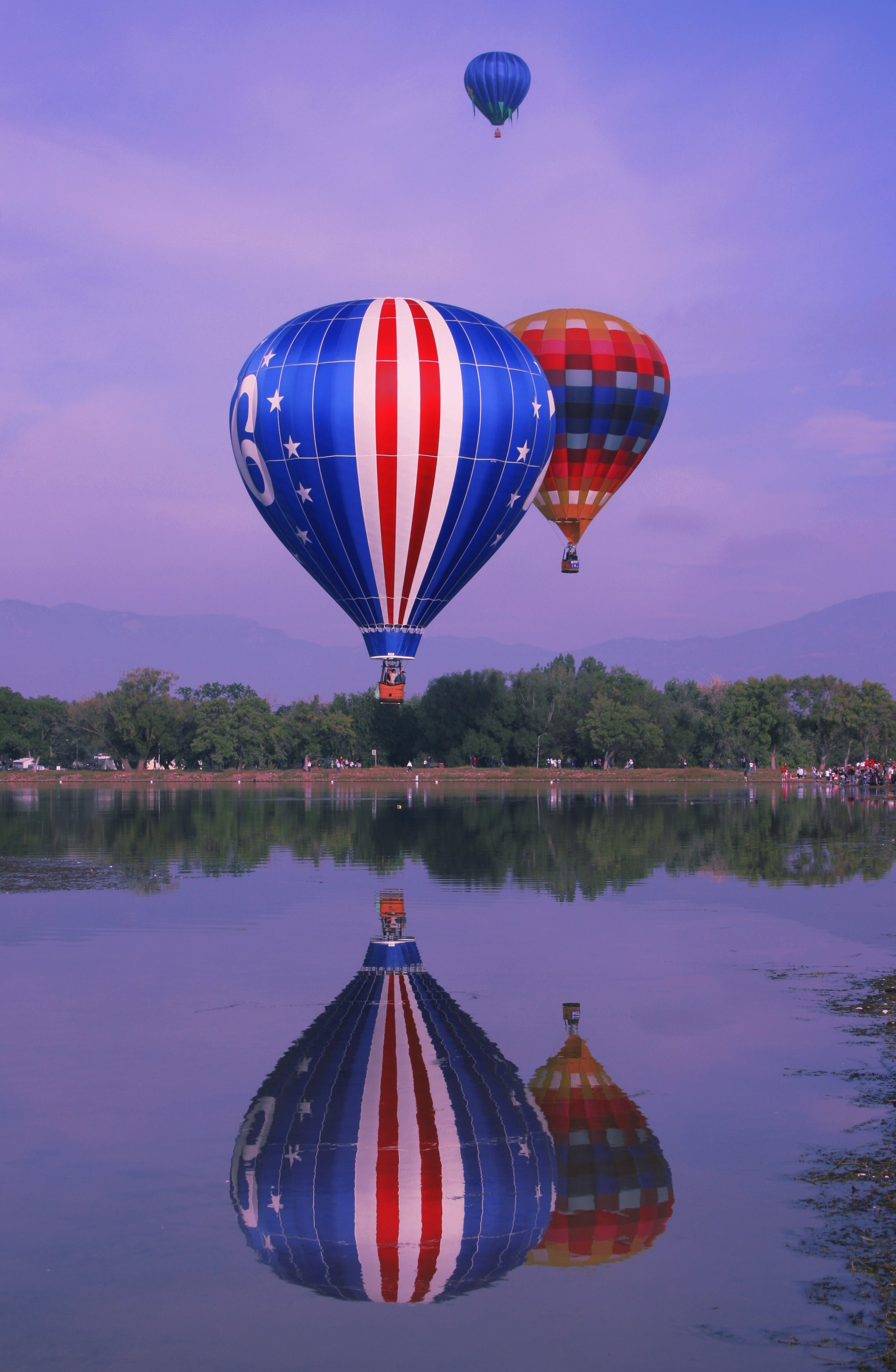
The 2009 Colorado Balloon Classic near Prospect Lake
