= Balloons over Waikato =

Coordinates: 37.79906°S 175.26847°E

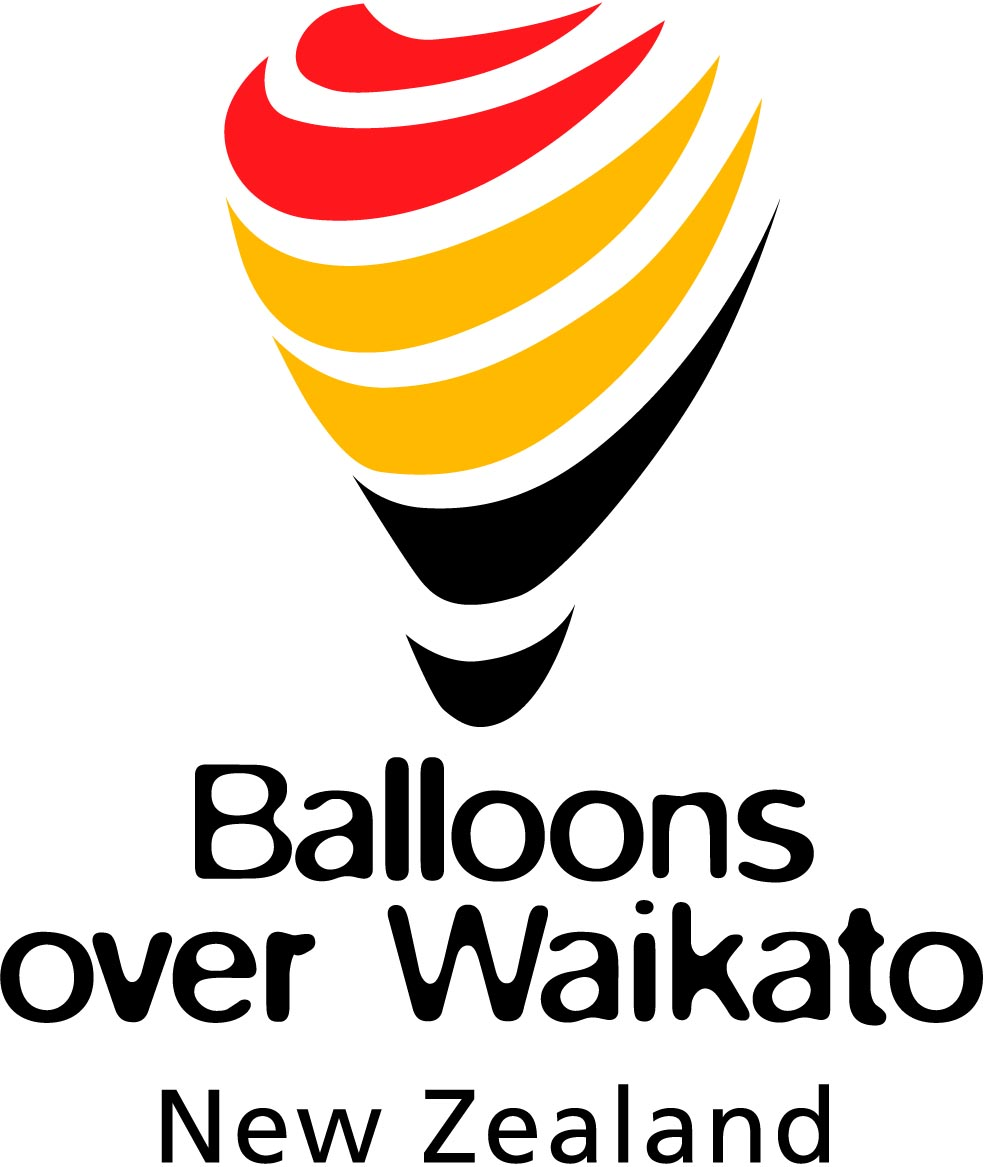

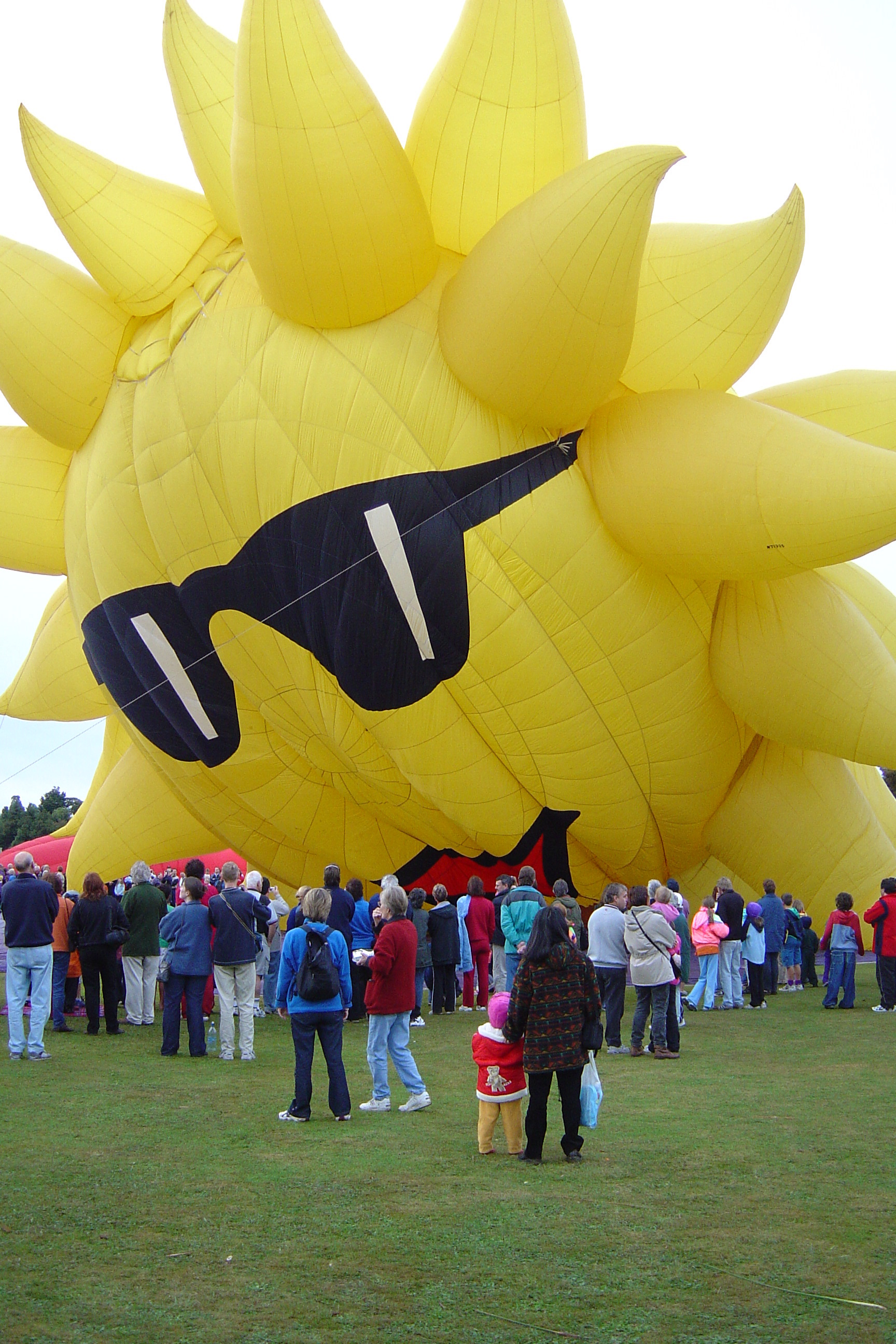
The distinctive shape of "Sunny Boy" inflating ready to fly at the Balloons Over Waikato festival

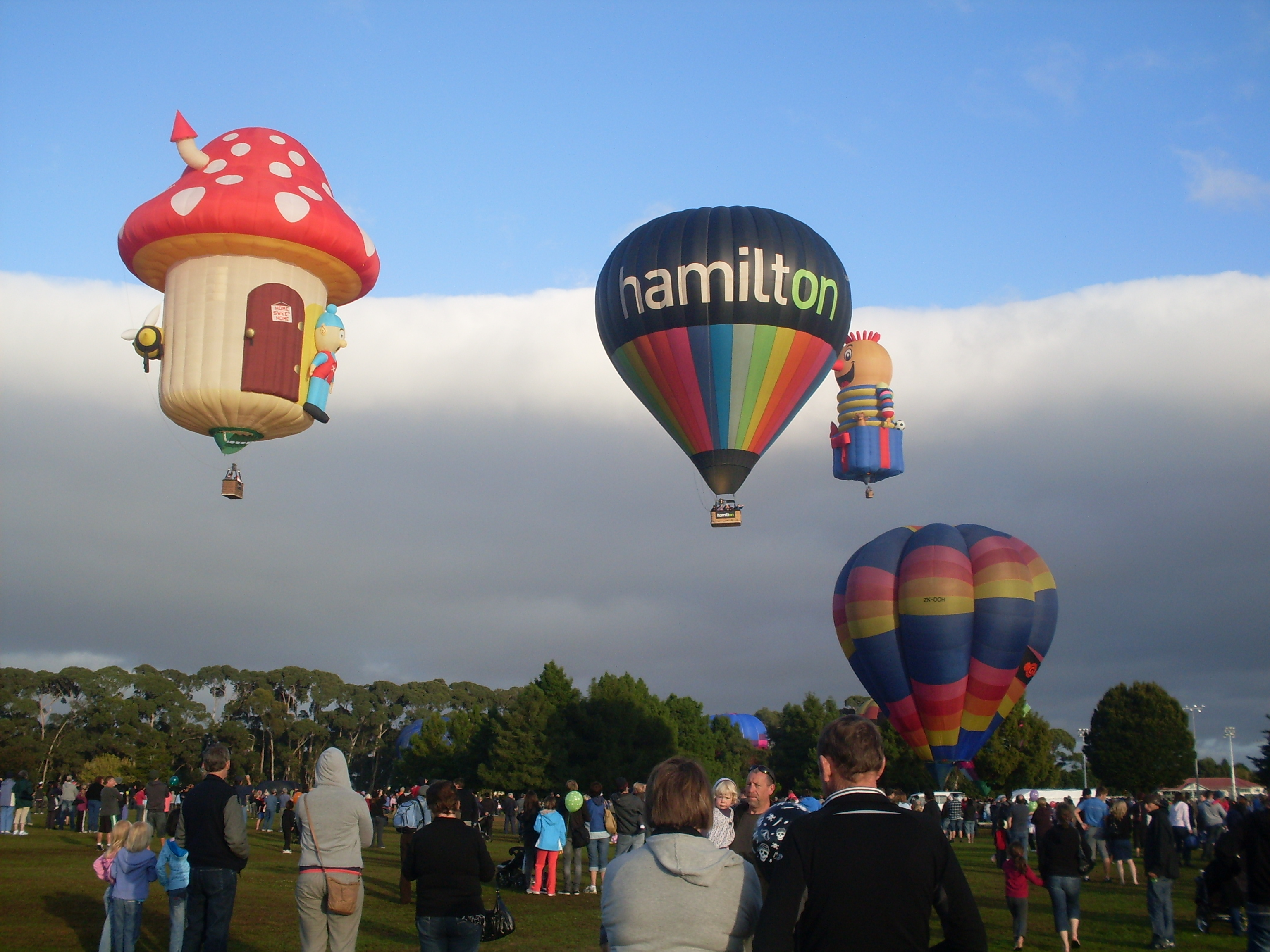
Various Balloons lifting off from Innes Common 2010

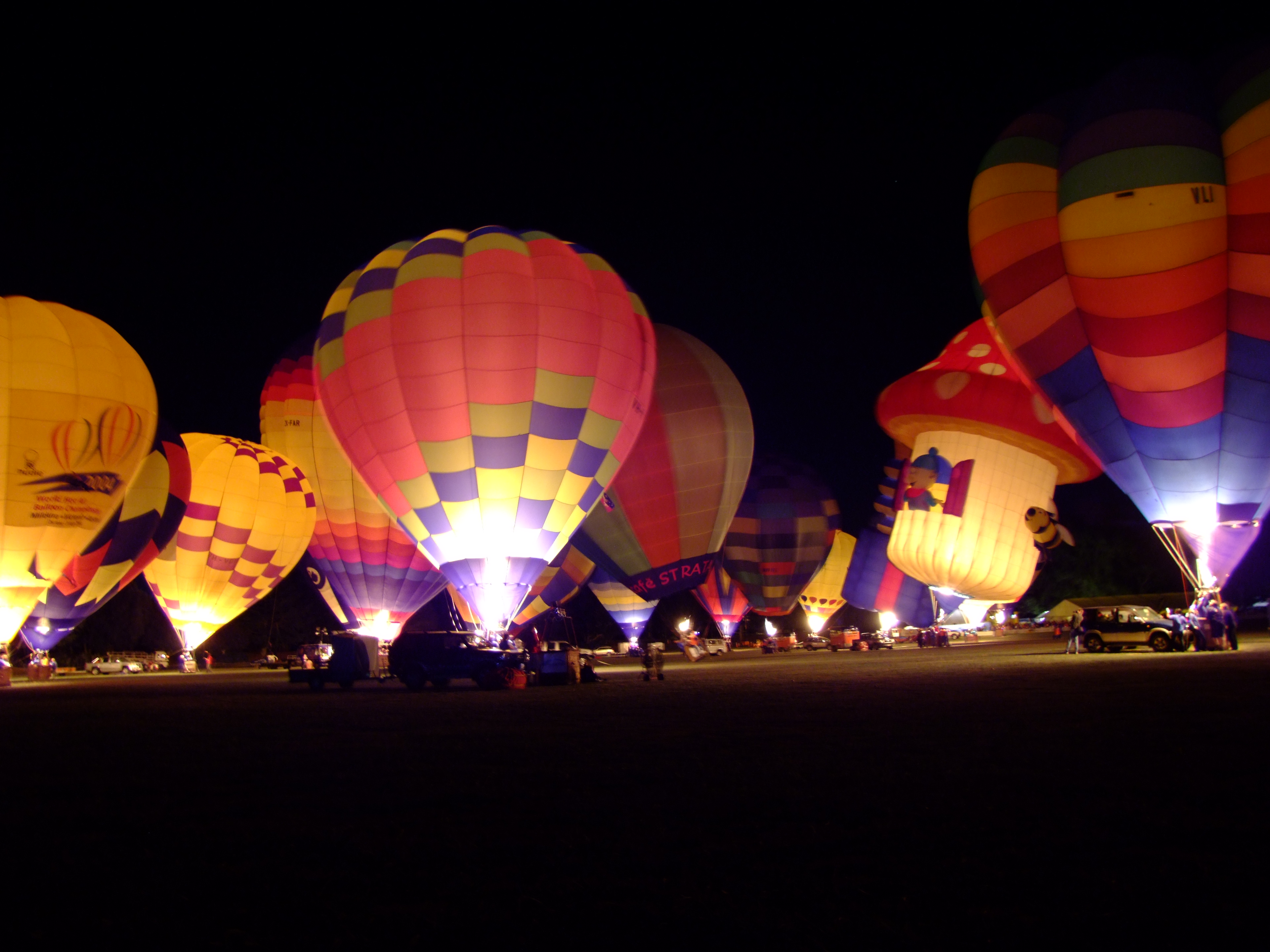
Night glow at the festival

Balloons Over Waikato is an annual hot air balloon festival held in Hamilton, New Zealand since 1999 by the non-profit organisation Balloons over Waikato Trust. The event spans five days during autumn and attracts both local and overseas balloonists. The Festival is held primarily at Innes Common, at Hamilton Lake, which gets an estimated 130,000 visitors during the festival. The highlight of the festival, the "Nightglow" where an estimated 80,000+ people attend to watch the lighting of balloons putting on a spectacular glow to music.

== Events ==
Events in the festival include sunrise launches, a walk-thru balloon in the city's Garden Place, the "Nightglow", a morning "Key Grab" competition where balloonists must attempt to secure a key placed on a pole in Innes Common and Balloons visits events such as The Base Basket Burn.

The schedule changes yearly.

== History ==
Balloons Over Waikato won the Best Not for Profit at the Westpac Business Excellence Awards in 2008. In 2014, free bus services were offered for the nightglow event. In 2015, Balloons Over Waikato was named Best Established Community Event at the New Zealand Association of Event Professionals awards ceremony. In 2017, a hot air balloon landed in the middle of a Hamilton intersection. In 2019, the event celebrated its 20th birthday. That same year, the City Burn event as part of Balloons Over Waikato was recorded as a summer month highlight. The ongoing COVID-19 pandemic saw the Nightglow not go forward in 2020 for the first time in its 21-year history, while the Innes Common morning showcases continued with no audience allowed.

== See also ==
- Hot air balloon festivals
