= Ashland BalloonFest =

- Festival in 2026
- Begins: Late June
- Ends: Sunday
- Frequency: Annual since 1990
- Locations: Freer Field, Ashland, Ohio
- Inaugurated: 1990
- Participants: Balloonists, Cluster ballooning

The Ashland BalloonFest is a hot air balloon festival which had been held annually at Freer Field in Ashland, Ohio since 1990. The modern festival was established in 1990 and has developed into a multi-day community event featuring hot-air balloon launches, balloon glows, live entertainment, food vendors and family activities.

== History ==
Ashland's association with balloons predates the modern Ashland BalloonFest. During the 20th century, the city was a major center of toy balloon manufacturing. A 2005 account of Ashland's balloon industry stated that, at one point, more than half of the world's supply of toy balloons was produced by five companies in the Ashland area.

The city's reputation was reflected in contemporary descriptions of Ashland as the "Balloon Center of the World." The original Ashland Balloon Festival was held in honor of the local toy-balloon industry and featured parades, a carnival and a Balloon Queen pageant.

One of the developments that contributed to Ashland's prominence in balloon manufacturing was the work of Ashland native Harry Ross Gill. In 1912, Gill developed a method for producing an elongated, cigar-shaped rubber balloon, expanding the types of toy balloons that could be manufactured in the city. He subsequently founded the Eagle Rubber Company in Ashland in 1913 and later established the National Latex Company in 1929.

Ashland's balloon industry became a significant part of the city's manufacturing economy. Companies in the city produced toy and party balloons for markets beyond Ashland, contributing to the city's reputation as a center of balloon production. The industry remained an important part of the city's identity for much of the 20th century.

Pioneer National Latex was one of the later major balloon manufacturers in Ashland. The company operated in the city from 1939 until 2023 and produced party balloons. By the time the modern BalloonFest was established, Ashland's balloon-manufacturing history provided an existing connection between the city and ballooning.

=== Modern festival ===
The modern Ashland BalloonFest was established in 1990. According to Ohio Magazine, local hot-air balloon pilot John Sidle was instrumental in establishing the event. The first modern festival featured approximately 19 to 20 hot-air balloons and was initially held as a one-day event. Following the first festival, community interest led organizers to expand the event.

The festival subsequently developed into a multi-day event centered on hot-air balloon flights and competitions. Additional entertainment and community activities were added as the festival grew. The event became associated with Freer Field, where balloon launches and other activities are held.

One of the festival's recurring features is the Balloon Glow, an evening display in which participating balloons are inflated and illuminated by their burners. The glow has become one of the festival's principal spectator events.

The festival has also developed a number of activities separate from ballooning. Among them is the Ashland BalloonFest 5K, a road race held as part of the annual festival. The race is scheduled at Freer Field during BalloonFest; the 2026 festival schedule placed the 5K on Saturday morning.

The festival also developed a longstanding group of organizers, pilots, volunteers and other participants. Rusty Cates became the longtime announcer and later became known as the "Voice of BalloonFest." In a 2025 interview, Cates recalled becoming involved with the festival during its early years and described John Sidle as one of the event's founders.

== Events ==
=== Hot-air balloon flights ===
Balloon flights are the central feature of the festival. Morning and evening flights are scheduled during the event, although flights are dependent on weather and wind conditions. Pilots also participate in balloon competitions and other organized flights.

=== Balloon glow ===
The balloon glow is held after sunset and features participating balloons illuminated by their burners while remaining tethered to the ground. The event combines the balloon display with music and other evening entertainment.

=== Community activities ===
In addition to ballooning activities, BalloonFest includes live musical performances, food vendors, merchants and activities for children. The festival has also featured races, tethered balloon rides and other attractions during its history.

== See also ==
- Ashland, Ohio
- Hot air balloon
- Hot air balloon festivals
