= London Balloon Festival =

Hot air balloon festival in Ontario, Canada

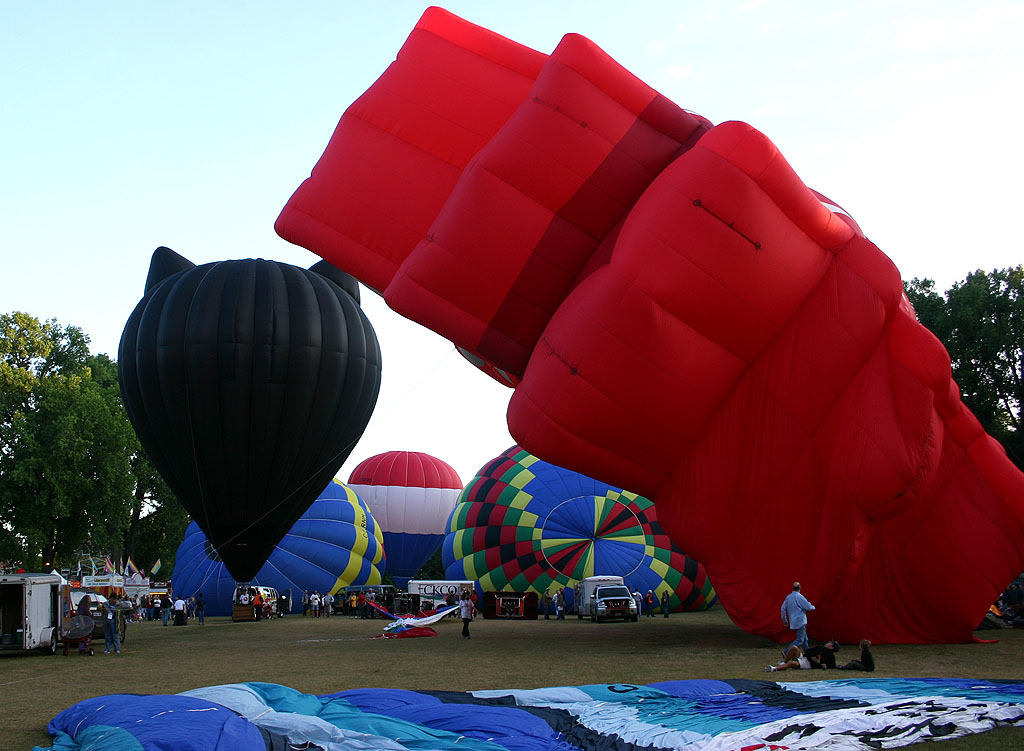
Balloons prepare to be launched at the 2005 festival

The London Hot-Air Balloon Festival (London Balloon Festival) was an annual hot-air balloon festival held in London, Ontario, Canada. The festival, which was held for the first time in 1984 and originally called the London Balloon Fiesta, used to take place in Harris Park at the forks of the Thames River during Simcoe Day (first Monday in August) weekend. The sponsor of the festival was Sundance Balloons. Spectators could get very close to the balloons, as there was no fixed barricades separating the launch area.

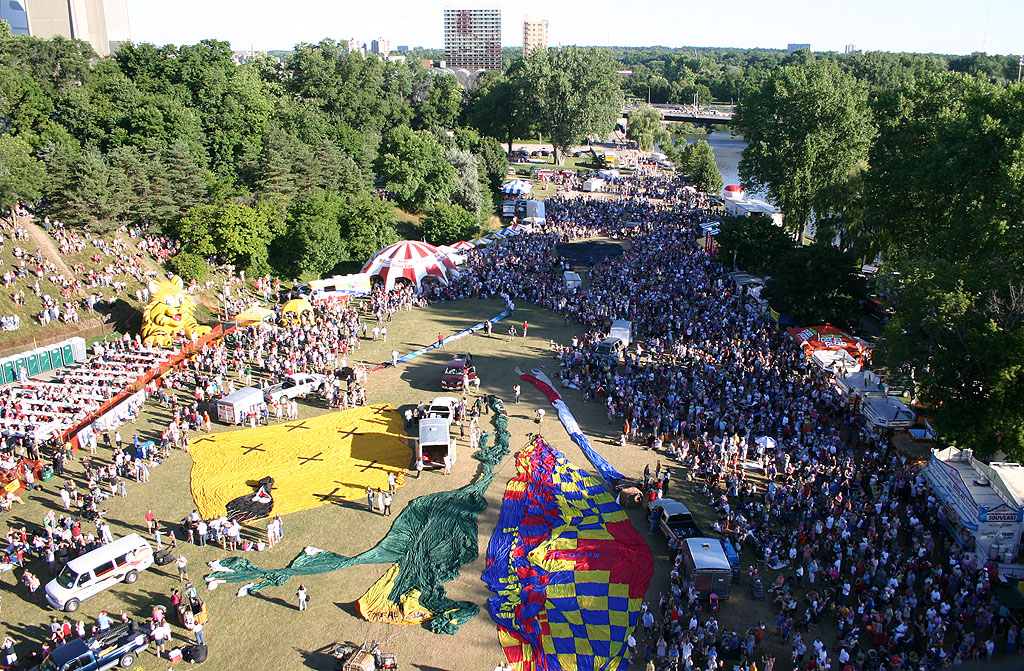
The crowd watches as balloons prepare to inflate

Several special-shaped balloons regularly attended, including the Canadian Flag, Maple Leaf, and Tyrone the T-Rex.

In addition to the balloon launches and rides, the festival featured an amusement park, concerts, and a night glow. Musical acts featured at the 2006 festival included Canadian artists Sloan and Mobile, as well as London band Bobnoxious.

In March 2008, Sundance Balloons announced that the 2008 edition of the event would not be held following several consecutive years of financial losses associated with the festival.
