= Bluegrass Balloon Festival =

Former hot air balloon festival in Louisville, KY, US 1999-2009

The Bluegrass Balloon Festival, formerly called the Adam Matthews Balloon Festival, was the fifth largest hot air balloon festival in the United States, and the largest in the state of Kentucky. From 1999 to 2009, it was held annually in late September at Bowman Field in Louisville, Kentucky.

The festival featured up to 100 hot air balloons participating in three early morning balloon races and two evening balloon glows. Other events included four live concerts, 11 free children's activities, and a car show featuring more than 150 classic, exotic, and modified cars. There was also a balloon education center teaching the fundamentals of ballooning, as well as food, a beer garden, and other activities. It was common to have crowds of more than 100,000 on the busiest day of the festival. Many events were held during the three days. One of the more popular attractions was the evening balloon glow, when balloons were inflated and glow to music after dark. Another was the early morning balloon race with a cash prize for the winner.

The Adam Matthews Balloon Festival celebrated its last festival in September 2006. The festival was purchased by The Spirit of Kentucky Foundation and was renamed the Bluegrass Balloon Festival.

== History ==
For many years, local pilots gathered to give back to the community by holding a year-end balloon glow at Bowman Field. When the local event was canceled due to the lack of funds, Adam Burckle, the founder of the Adam Matthews Cheesecake Company, came up with an idea that led to the festival.

The first year event was held with 52 balloons in attendance. Many balloons were local, although some pilots traveled from far across the United States. The initial event raised $20,000 for the Dream Factory, an organization that helps grant wishes to children with life-threatening diseases.

The second annual event was held in 2000 with 70 balloons from across the country. The event became so popular that the entry was limited to 70 balloons and there was a waiting list.

The events of the September 11, 2001 attacks on New York City and Washington, D.C. put some doubt into the flights of the festival, as civil aviation flights (including ballooning) were restricted for a period of time after the attacks. The festival petitioned the National Safety Council and the FAA to allow the flight of hot air balloons, which was approved only two days before the festival. Approximately 75 balloons attended the event that year, making it the largest balloon festival held in Kentucky's history.

By 2002, the event had grown to 85 registered balloons, and WHAS-TV 11, a local television station in Louisville, featured the evening Balloon Glow during its prime time broadcast. Meijers sponsored the Starship Concert, and Dean's Milk sponsored the balloon races with more than $27,500 in prize money. Pilots travelled from as far as away as New Zealand, Canada and the Western U.S.; they raised more than $35,000 for the Make-A-Wish Foundation, the Louisville Zoo, and the Crusade for Children.

By 2003, the festival had grown to 100 registered balloons, with more than $40,000 in prizes awarded. There was also six hours of live TV coverage, and more than 120,000 people attended the event over three days. Portions of the parking fees benefited the Crusade for Children, and additional funds were raised for the Louisville Zoo and several other local non-profit groups.

In 2007 the Adam Matthews Balloon Festival was purchased by the Spirit of Kentucky Foundation for $1, and the event was renamed the Bluegrass Balloon Festival. It continued to be the largest ballooning event in Kentucky and the fifth largest in the United States.

The festival was cancelled in 2010 for various reasons. It was to return in 2011 with a new name, "Spirit of Kentucky Balloon Festival", but that was cancelled as well. There has been no sign of the existence of the festival since that time.

== See also ==
- List of attractions and events in the Louisville metropolitan area
