= Balloon glow =

Event involving hot air balloons

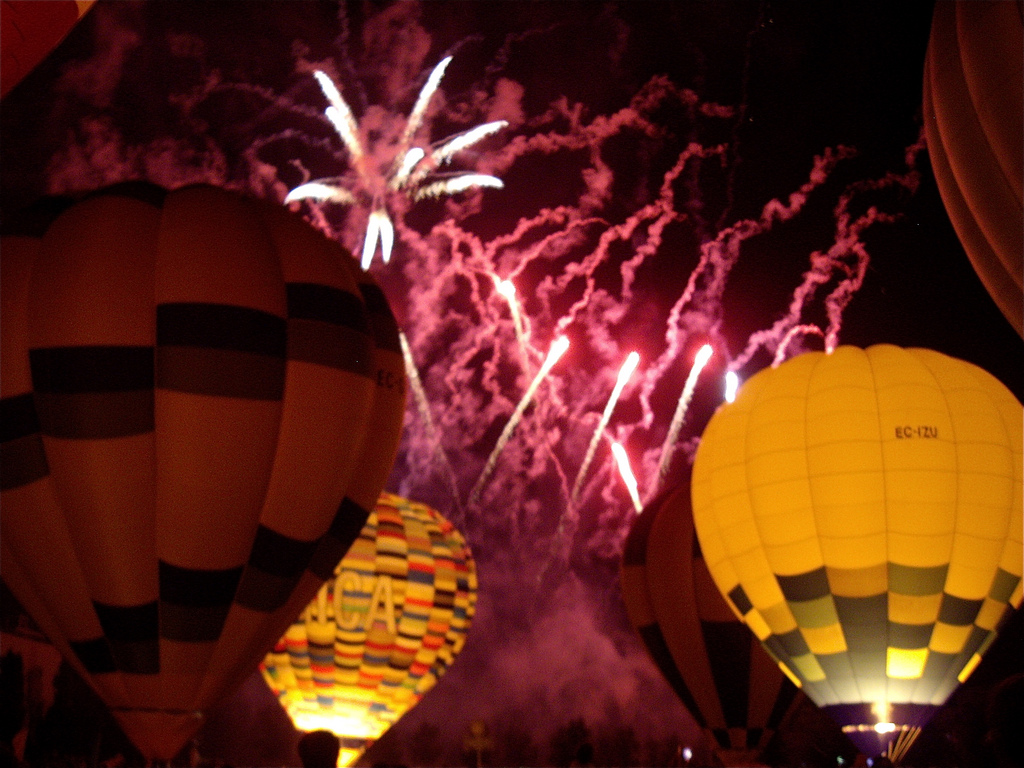
Night glow with fireworks at the European Balloon Festival, July, 2008

A balloon glow or night glow is an event often held as a warmup to a hot air balloon festival. The balloons are set up before sunrise in the launch area, an open field, or a football stadium and are inflated as if they are going to take off, but instead of being allowed to ascend, they are held down by the ground crew. The propane burners are ignited periodically to keep the balloons inflated with hot air.

Since the event typically occurs in the dark, the balloons glow like huge light bulbs or Chinese lanterns, giving a spectacular display for the audience. Sometimes the event is judged and sometimes it is held merely for entertainment and the celebration of ballooning.

== Gallery ==
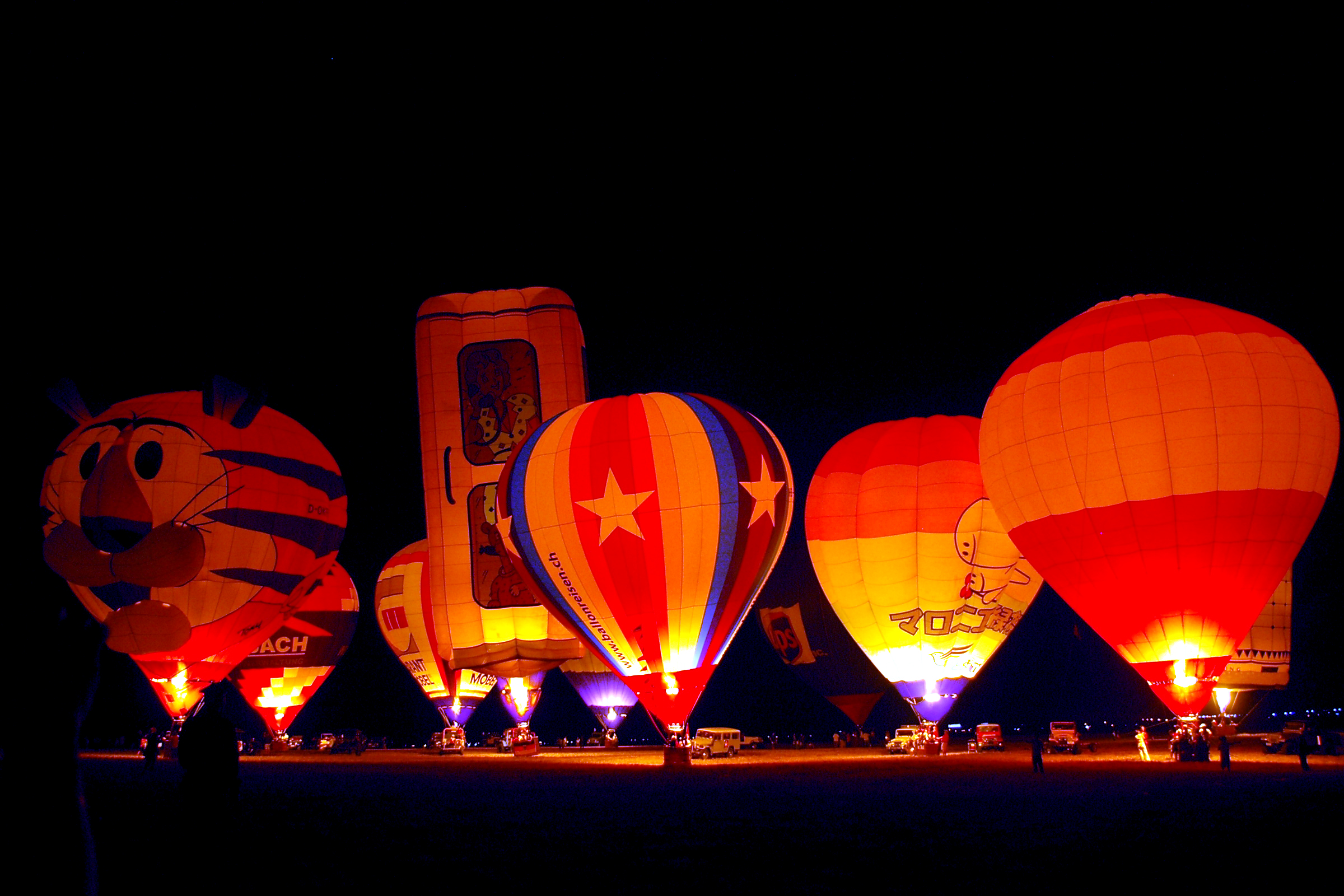
Night Glow display at the Philippine International Hot Air Balloon Fiesta in Angeles City, Philippines.

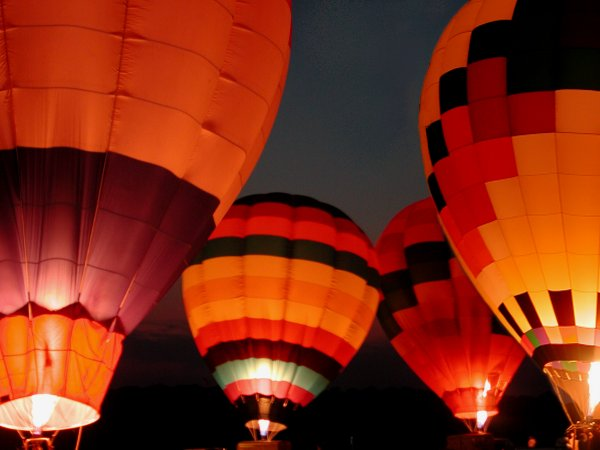
Night glow at the Great Pershing Balloon Derby near Brookfield, Missouri, September, 2001

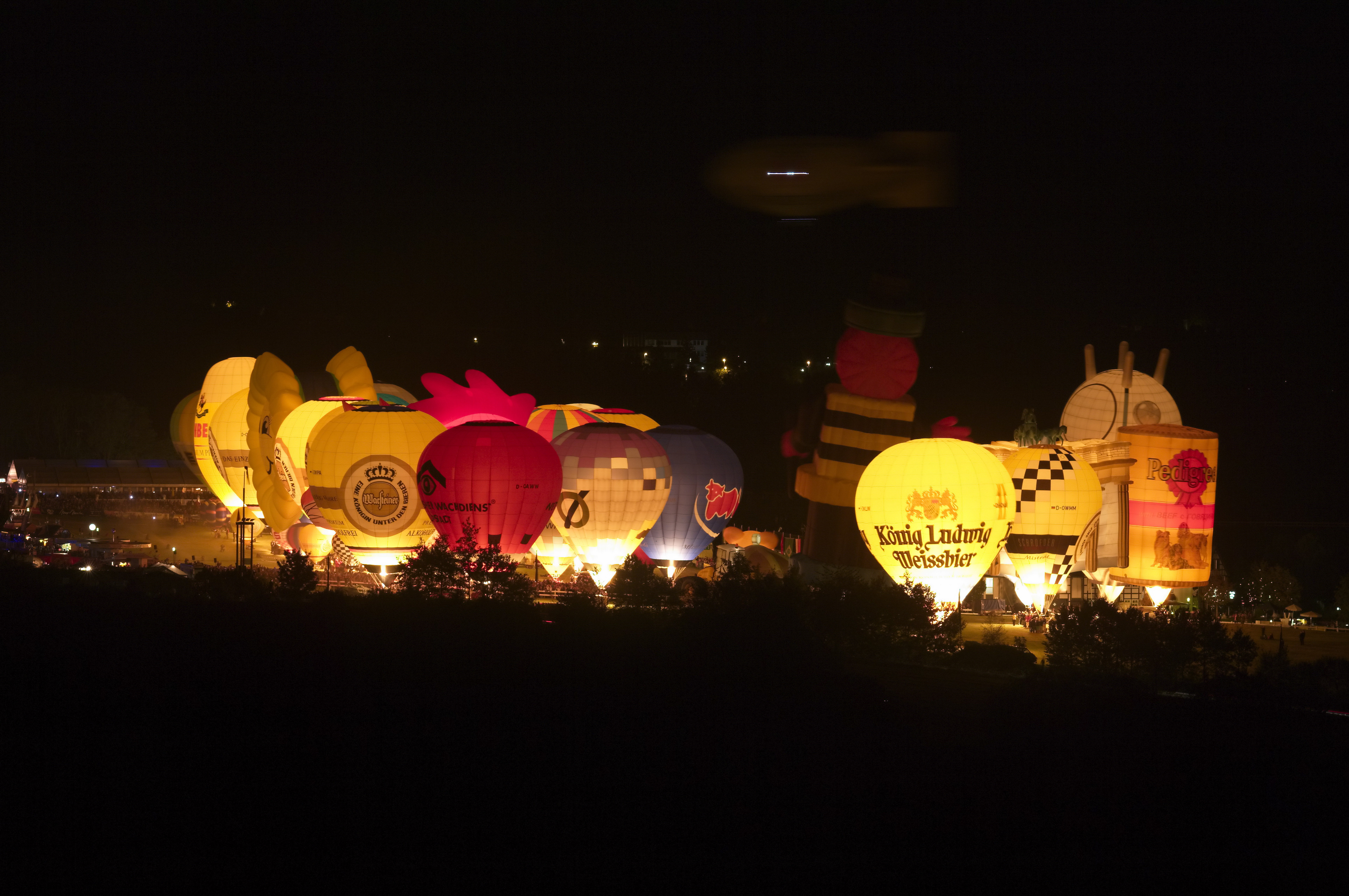
Night glow at the "Warsteiner Internationale Montgolfiade" in Warstein, Germany, September 2012

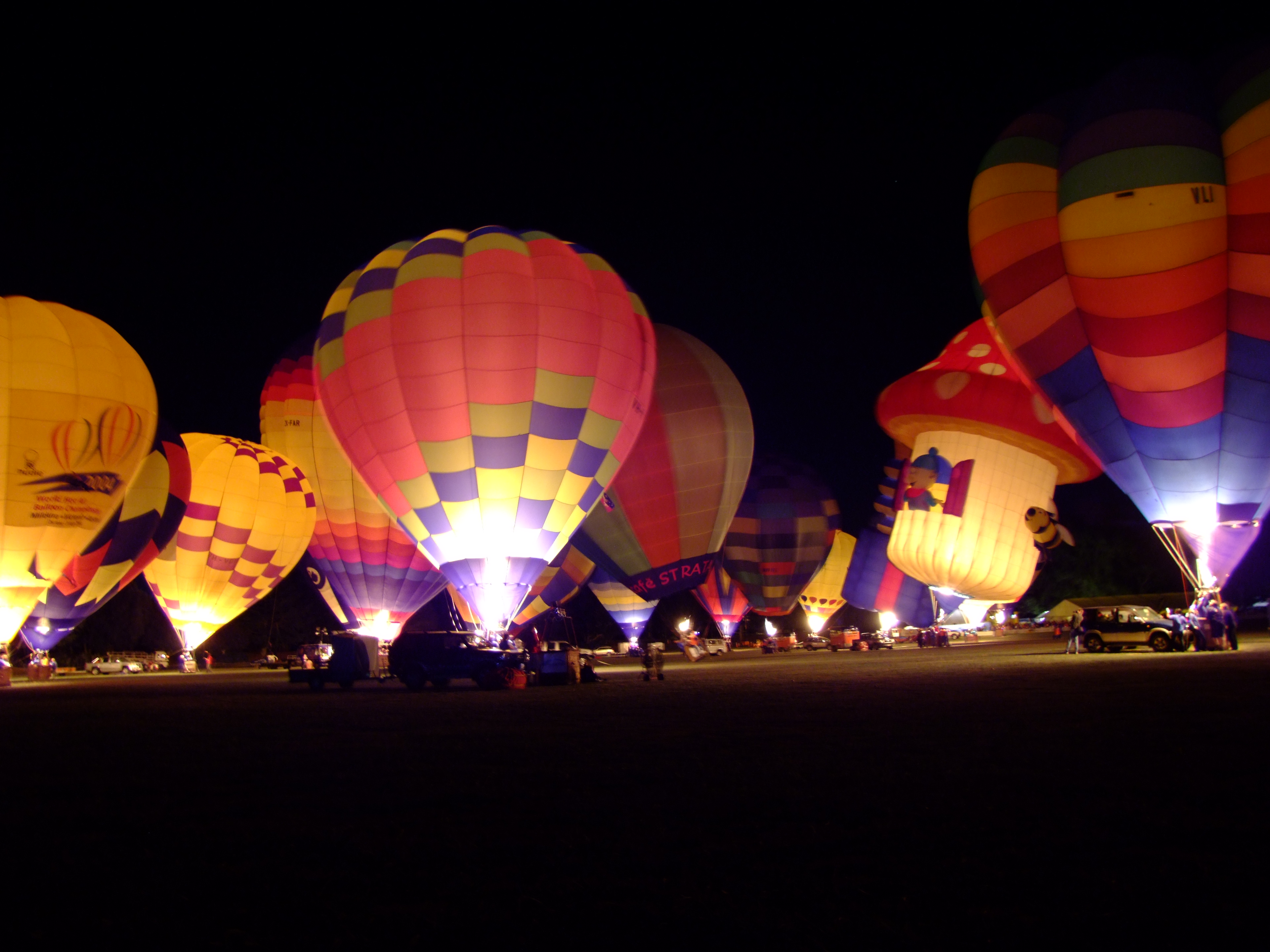
Night glow at Balloons over Waikato in Hamilton, New Zealand, 2010

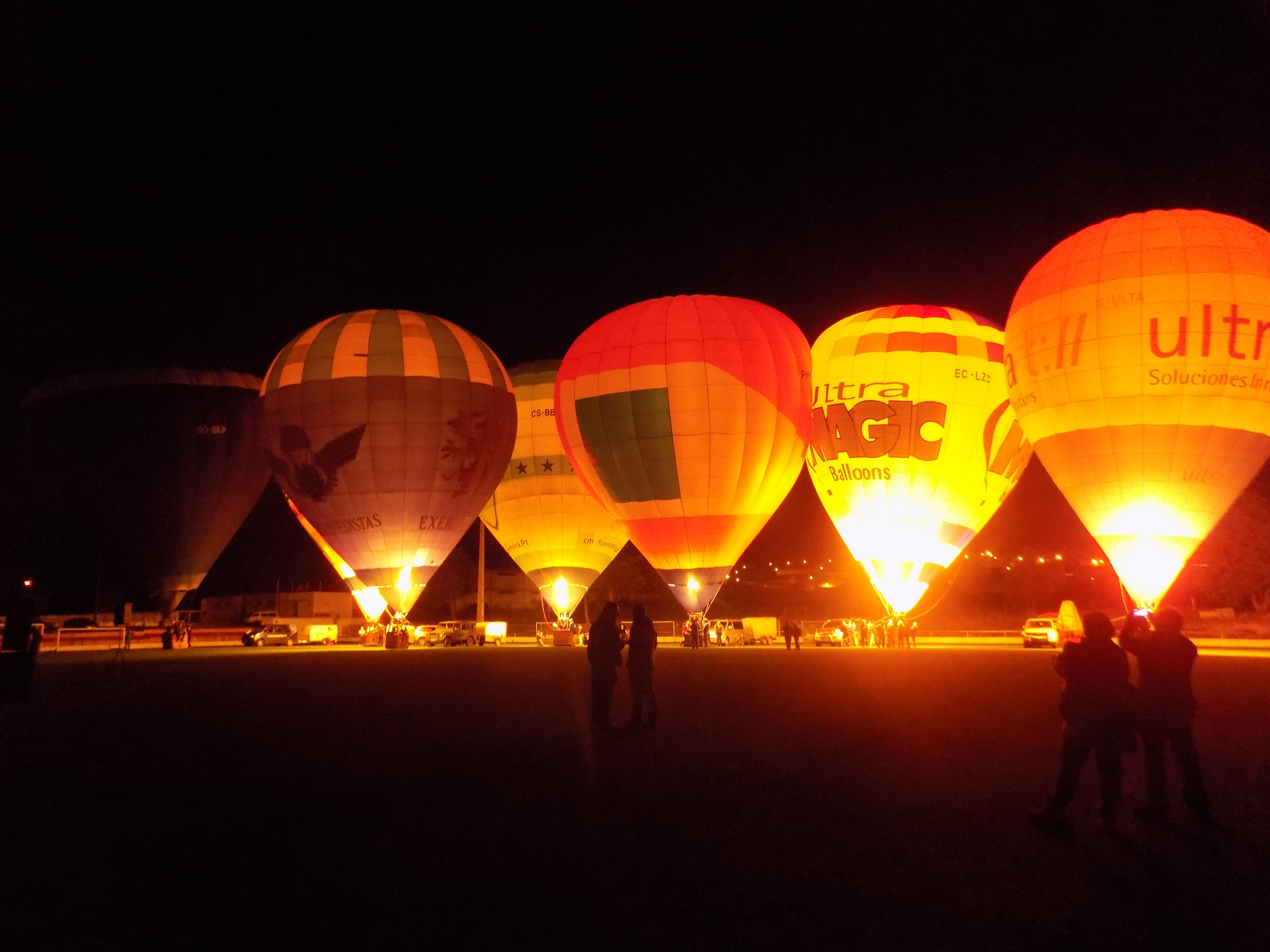
Night Glow at the 20º Hot Air Balloon Festival (FIBAQ) in Alter do Chão, 11 November 2016

== See also ==
- Hot Air Balloon Festivals
