= Penang Hot Air Balloon Fiesta =

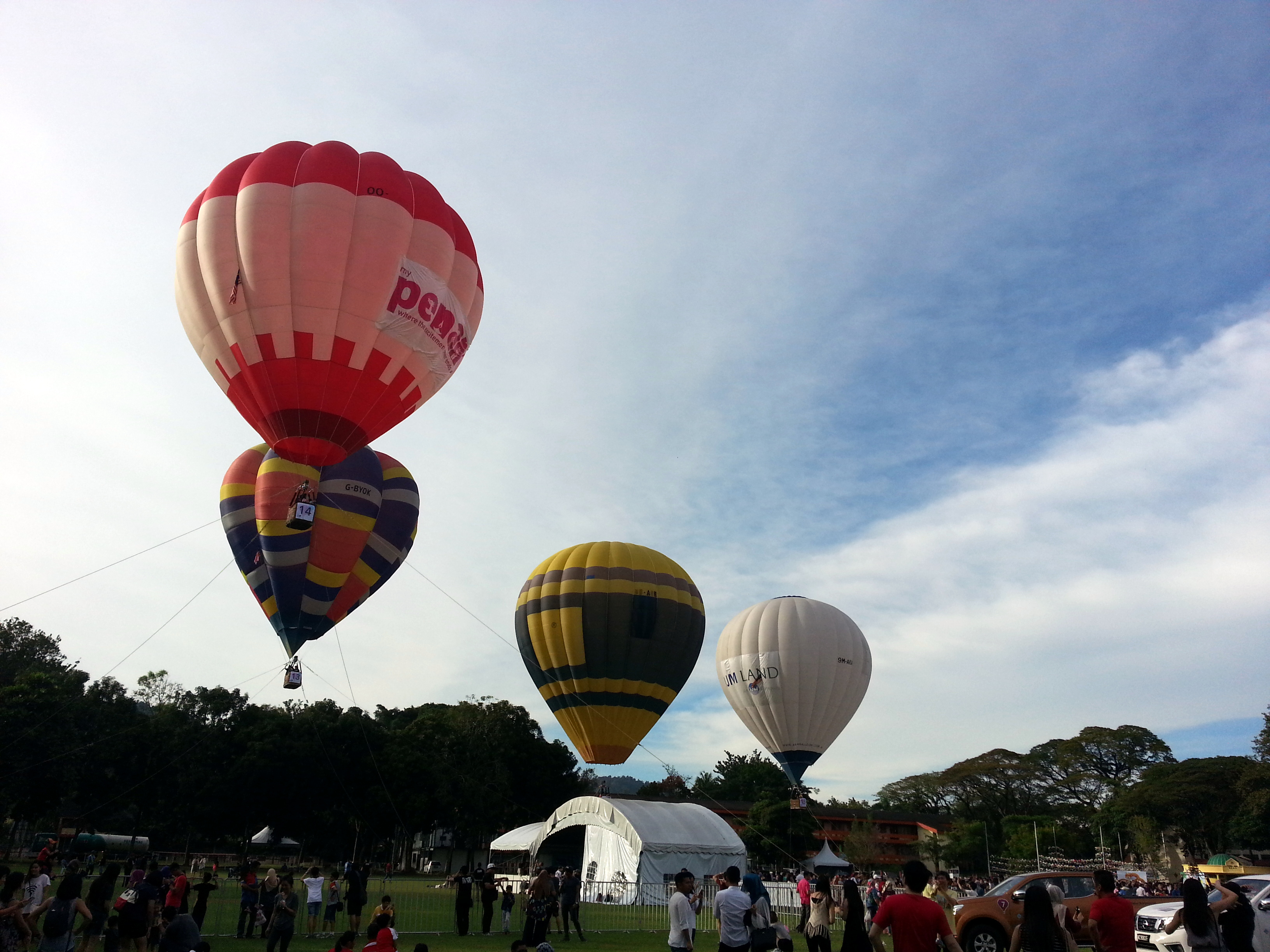
- Genre: Hot air balloon festival
- Frequency: Annually
- Venue: Polo Ground
- Locations: George Town, Penang
- Country: Malaysia
- Inaugurated: 2015
- Most recent: 2020
- Attendance: 170,000 (2017)
- Organiser: AKA Balloon Sdn Bhd
- Website: penanghotairballoonfiesta.com

The Penang Hot Air Balloon Fiesta is an annual hot air balloon festival held within the city of George Town in Penang, Malaysia. The festival, organised by AKA Balloon Sdn Bhd, a Malaysian private limited firm, takes place every February at the city's Polo Ground.

Inaugurated in 2015, the two-day Penang Hot Air Balloon Fiesta typically features 15 hot air balloons, with the participating crew coming from various nations such as Malaysia, the Netherlands, Belgium and the United States. The previous edition of the festival in 2017 attracted as many as 170,000 visitors.

== History ==
The Penang Hot Air Balloon Fiesta, the first hot air balloon festival in the State of Penang, was mooted to boost tourist arrivals into the city-state. The inaugural event, held at the Polo Ground on 21 and 22 February 2015, was timed to coincide with the Chinese New Year festivities.

Since then, the event has grown considerably. Several on-site family-friendly activities have been added into the two-day event, including workshops, photography contests and kite flying. Smaller-scale preludes to the yearly event have been organised as well, such as a mini balloon fiesta at the Esplanade and a balloon display in Butterworth on the mainland.

== See also ==
- Hot air balloon festival
