= Spirit of Boise Balloon Classic =

Annual hot air balloon festival

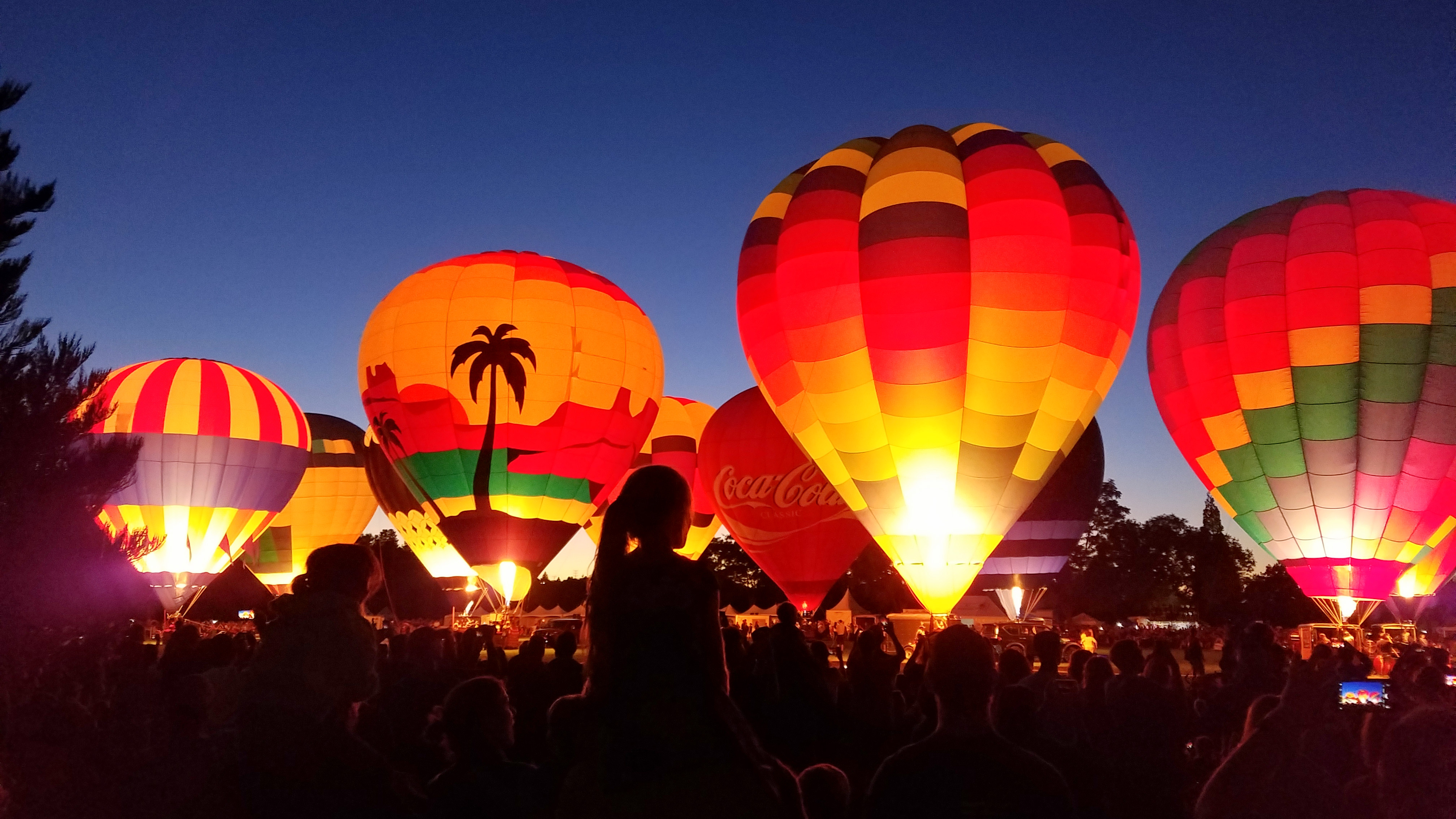
- 2018 Spirit of Boise Balloon Classic
- Status: Active
- Genre: Festivals
- Frequency: Annually
- Venue: Ann Morrison Park
- Location: Boise, Idaho
- Coordinates: 43°36′33″N 116°13′05″W
- Country: USA
- Years active: 35
- Founded: 1991
- Founder: Scott Spencer, Steve Schmader
- Sponsor: CapEd, Coca-Cola
- Website: spiritofboise.com

The Spirit of Boise Balloon Classic is an annual, five-day festival held at Ann Morrison Park in Boise, Idaho, USA, featuring hot air balloon flying, which replaced an annual balloon event that had occurred in Boise since 1974.

== History ==
The Spirit of Boise Balloon Classic was organized by balloonist Scott Spencer and began in 1991, featuring ten balloons. It was originally part of the Boise River Festival until that was discontinued in 2002. The 70 ft (21 m) Spirit of Boise hot air balloon was designed by Boise school children in 1999, and constructed with grant money from the Boise 2000 Lasting Legacy Committee.

The festival was not held from 2007 to 2009, but returned in 2010 with balloon rides, free live music, and a variety of food vendors. The 2016 Spirit of Boise Balloon Classic inspired emerging artist Betsie Richardson to paint a Boise traffic control box. The work, titled Lift off at the Spirit of Boise Balloon Classic, has been featured by the Boise City Department of Arts and History. The 2018 edition of the event featured over 40 hot air balloons. The event was cancelled for a fourth time in 2020, deferring the 27th edition to 2021.

== See also ==
Hot air ballooning
Hot air balloon festival
