= List of hot air balloon festivals =

Hot air balloon festivals are held annually in many places throughout the year, allowing balloon pilots and the general public to gather together and enjoy hot air balloons. The festivals can include races, balloon rides, and "night glows", in which balloons are fired while remaining tethered to the ground illuminating them in the dark. Many US hot air balloon festivals also include live music, car shows, craft fairs, and other activities to entertain the whole community.

== List ==
Festival	City	Country	Year started	Year ended	When held	Official website
Adirondack Hot Air Balloon Festival	Queensbury, New York	United States	1973		Mid to late September	
Festival internacional del globo de Leon	León, Guanajuato	México	2002			
Alabama Jubilee Hot Air Balloon Classic	Decatur, Alabama	United States	1977			
Albuquerque International Balloon Fiesta	Albuquerque, New Mexico	United States	1972		First full week in October including both adjacent weekends	
All Ohio Balloon Festival	Marysville, Ohio	United States	1975		Second or third weekend of August	
Ashland BalloonFest	Ashland, Ohio	United States	1990		Late June	
Atlantic Balloon Fiesta	Sussex, New Brunswick	Canada	1985		Always the weekend after labor Day	
Balloons over Waikato	Hamilton, North Island	New Zealand	1999			
Bluegrass Balloon Festival	Louisville, Kentucky	United States	1999			
Bristol International Balloon Fiesta	Bristol	United Kingdom	1979			
Canberra Balloon Spectacular	Canberra	Australia	1987			
Centralia Balloon Fest	Centralia, Illinois	United States	1990			
Colorado Balloon Classic	Colorado Springs, Colorado	United States	1977		Labor Day weekend in September	
Dinah "Soar" Days	Vernal, Utah	United States			Last weekend in August	https://www.dinahdays.com/
European Balloon Festival	Igualada, Catalonia	Spain	1997		First fortnight of July	
Ferrara Balloons Festival	Ferrara	Italy	2005			(Italian)
Festival Internacional de Balonismo de Torres	Rio Grande do Sul	Brazil	1989		Late April	(Portuguese)
Gatineau Hot Air Balloon Festival	Gatineau, Quebec	Canada	1988		Labor Day Weekend	
Gordon Bennett Cup gas balloon race	Varies	Varies	1906		Hosted by country of the race winner two years prior.	
Great Falls Balloon Festival	Lewiston / Auburn, Maine	United States	1992			
Great Forest Park Balloon Race	Saint Louis, Missouri	United States	1973			
Great Pershing Balloon Derby	Brookfield, Missouri	United States	1977			
Great Reno Balloon Race	Reno, Nevada	United States	1981			
Great Texas Balloon Race	Longview, Texas / Kilgore, Texas	United States	1977			
Great Wellsville Balloon Rally	Wellsville, New York	United States	1975		Third Weekend of July	
Gulf Coast Hot Air Balloon Festival	Foley, Alabama	United States	2005		Spring	
Huff 'n' Puff	Topeka, Kansas	United States	1976		Second weekend of September	
International Hot-Air Balloon Festival in Château-d'Oex	Château-d'Œx	Switzerland	1979			
International Balloon Festival of Saint-Jean-sur-Richelieu	Saint-Jean-sur-Richelieu, Quebec	Canada	1984		Mid-August	
Jupiter Flights Balloon Festival	Fishers, Indiana	United States	2021		Early September.	
Lakeside of the Smokies Balloon Fest	Dandridge, Tennessee	United States				
London International Hot Air Balloon Festival	London, Ontario	Canada	1983	2007		
Lord Mayor's Hot Air Balloon Regatta	London	United Kingdom	2015			
Michigan Challenge Balloonfest	Howell, Michigan	United States	1985			
National Balloon Classic	Indianola, Iowa	United States	1969		First week of August	
Northampton Balloon Festival	Northampton	United Kingdom	1990			
Northwest Art and Air Festival	Albany, Oregon	United States	2000			
Page, AZ Balloon Regatta & Street Fair	Page, Arizona	United States	2026		First weekend of November	
Philippine International Hot-Air Balloon Fiesta	Angeles City	Philippines	1994		2nd week of February	
Plano Balloon Festival	Plano, Texas	United States	1980			
Plainville Hot Air Balloon Festival	Plainville, Connecticut	United States	1987		Late Summer	
Quick Chek New Jersey Festival of Ballooning	Readington Township, New Jersey	United States	1983		Third week of July	
Saga International Balloon Fiesta	Saga, Saga	Japan	1980			
Saxonia International Balloon Fiesta	Leipzig	Germany	1995	2015		
Suncook Valley Rotary Hot Air Balloon Rally	Pittsfield, New Hampshire	United States	1981		First weekend in August	
Spirit of Boise Balloon Classic	Boise, Idaho	United States	1991			
Taunggyi Tazaungdaing Festival	Taunggyi, Shan State	Myanmar	1894			
Temecula Valley Balloon and Wine Festival	Temecula, California	United States	1984			
Velikie Luki International Balloon Meet	Velikiye Luki	Russia	1996		June	
Warren County Farmers' Fair Balloon Festival	New Jersey	United States	2000		July/August	

== Gallery ==
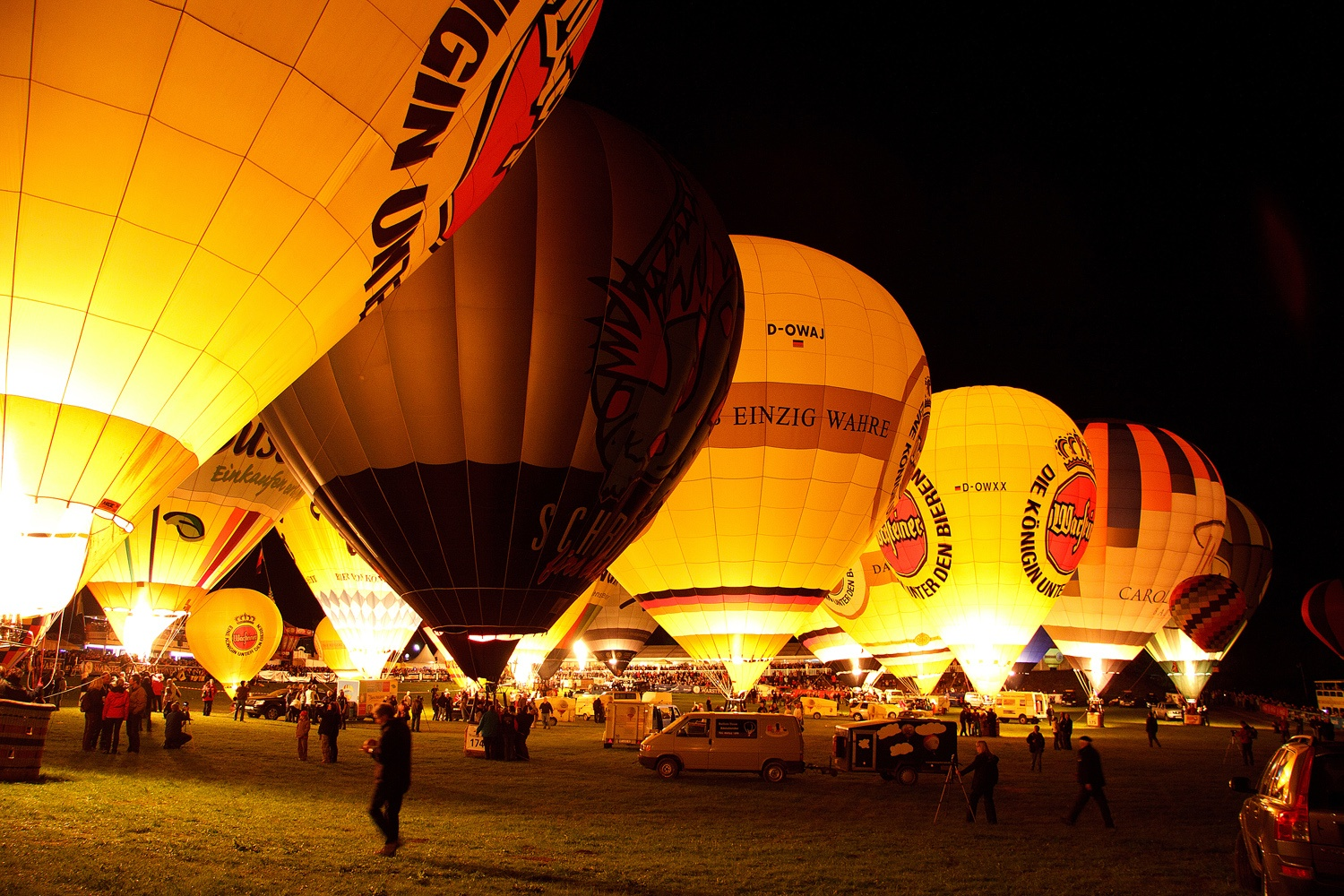
Warsteiner Internationale Montgolfiade (WIM), Germany

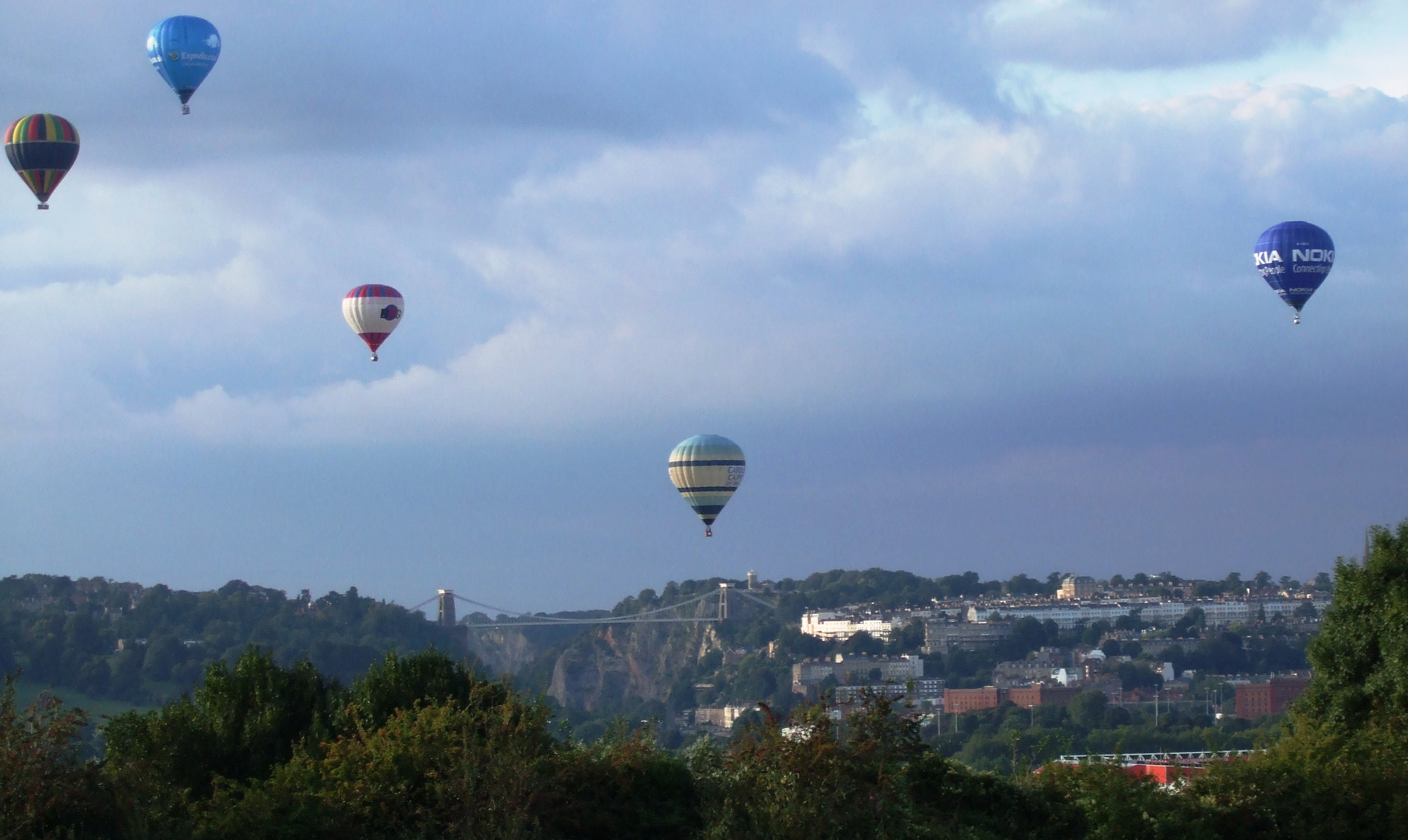
The Bristol International Balloon Fiesta (held in the city of Bristol, England), is one of the biggest festivals of its type in Europe

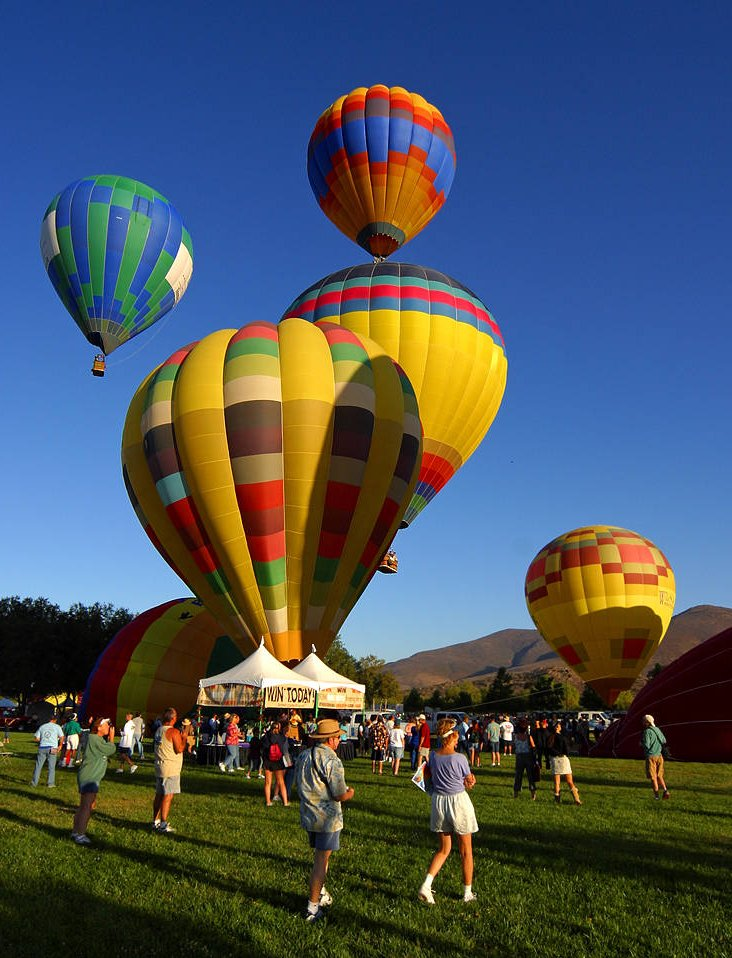
Temecula Valley Balloon and Wine Festival

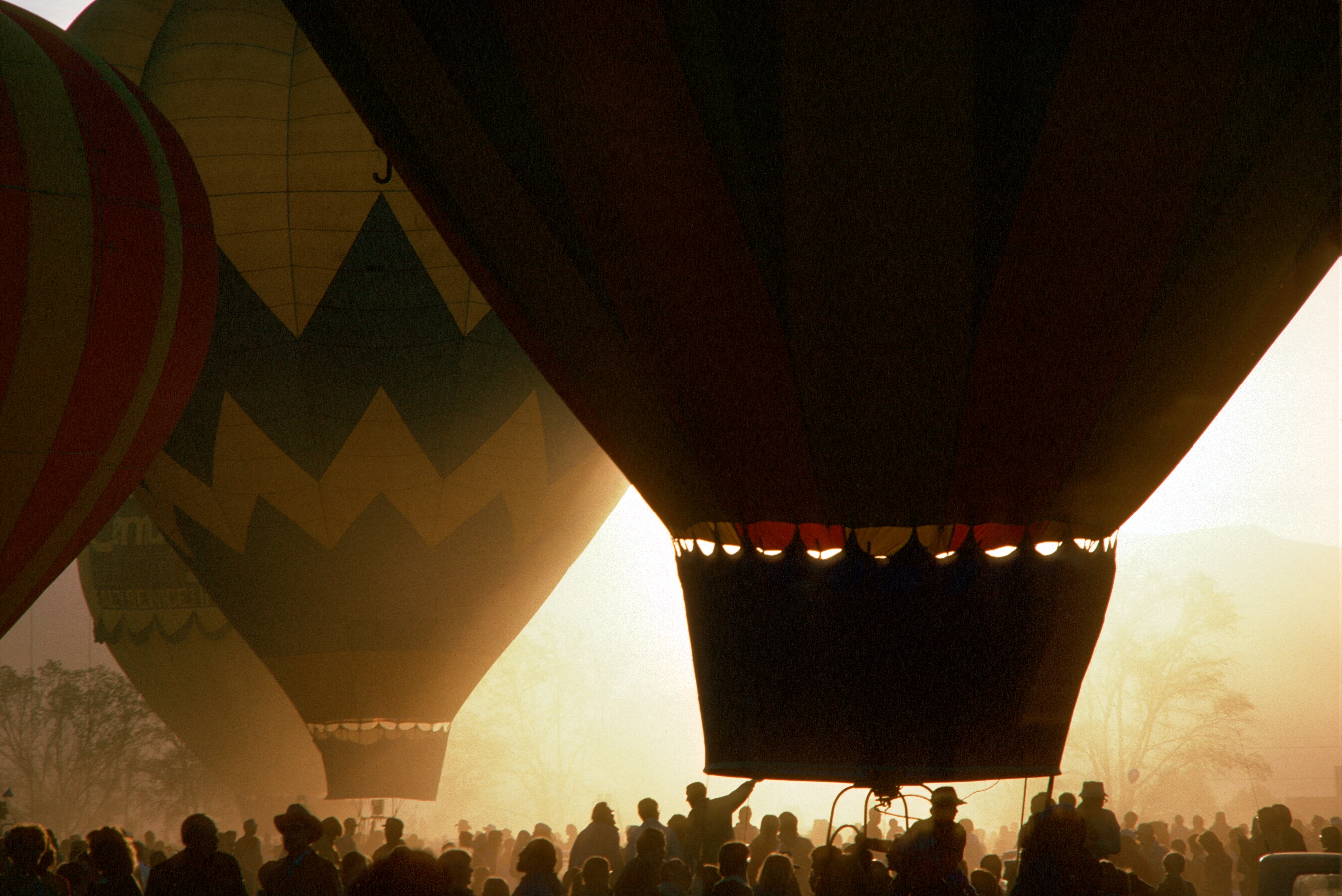
Albuquerque International Balloon Fiesta, the largest gathering of hot air balloons in the world.

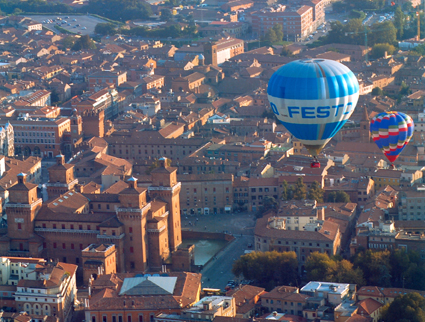
Balloons flying above the Ancient Castle of Ferrara during the Ferrara Balloon Festival

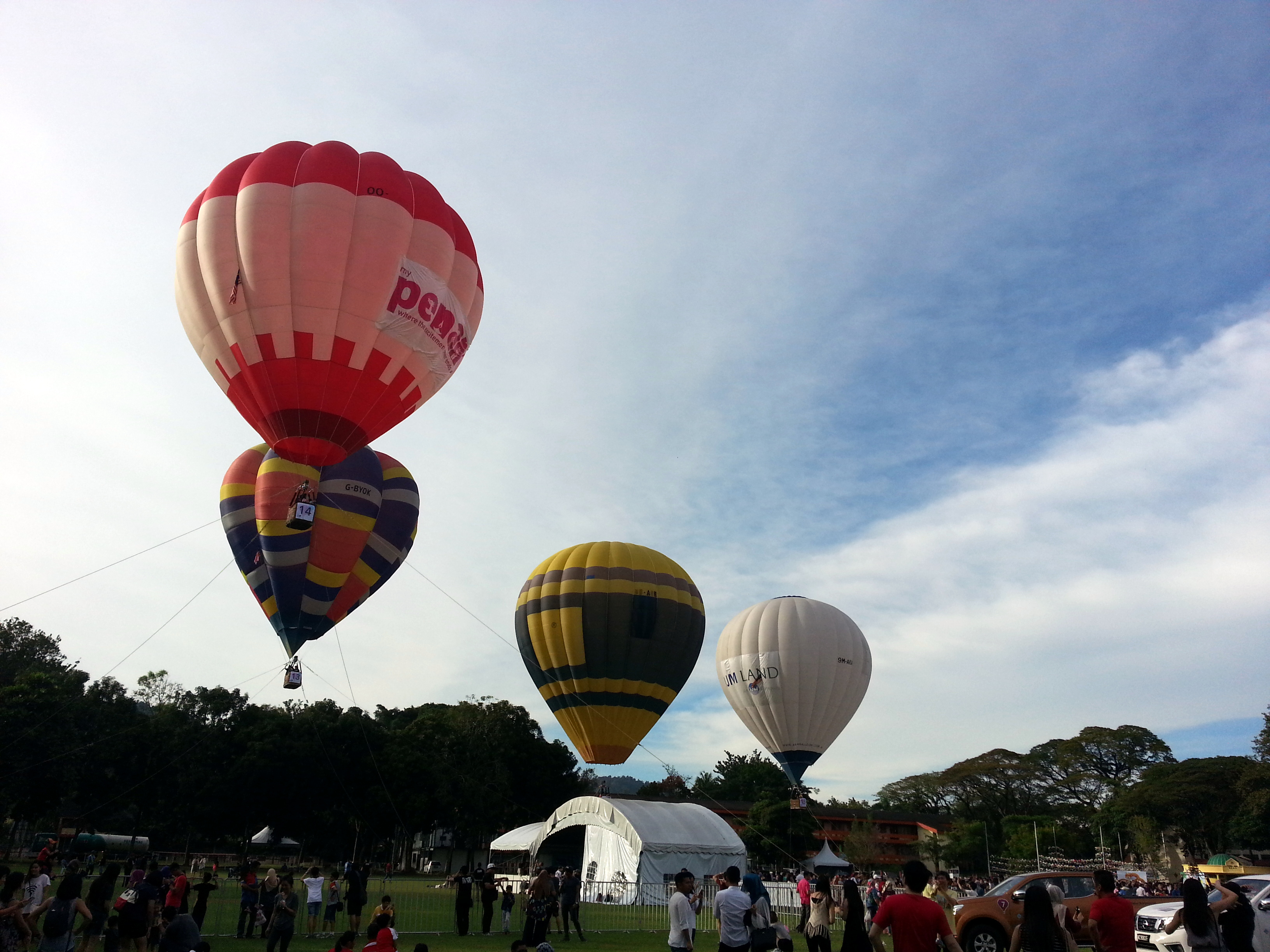
Balloons flying during the Penang Hot Air Balloon Fiesta in George Town, Penang in 2017.

Starting balloons at the Warsteiner Internationale Montgolfiade in Warstein, Germany

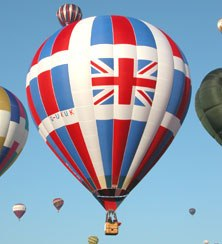
Grand Britannia, the Great British Balloon flying at the Mondial event in Lorraine, France

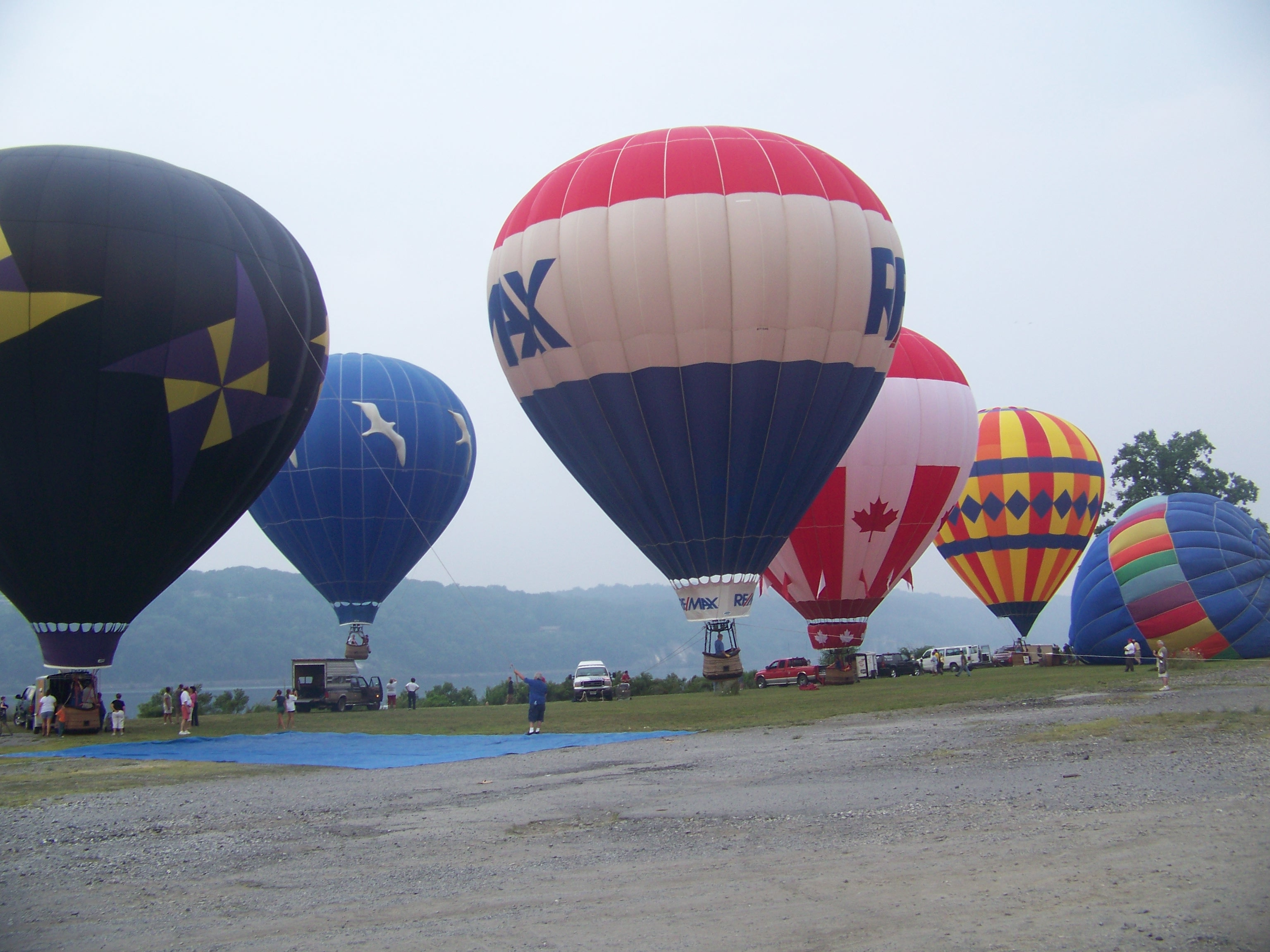
Mid-Hudson Valley Balloon Festival

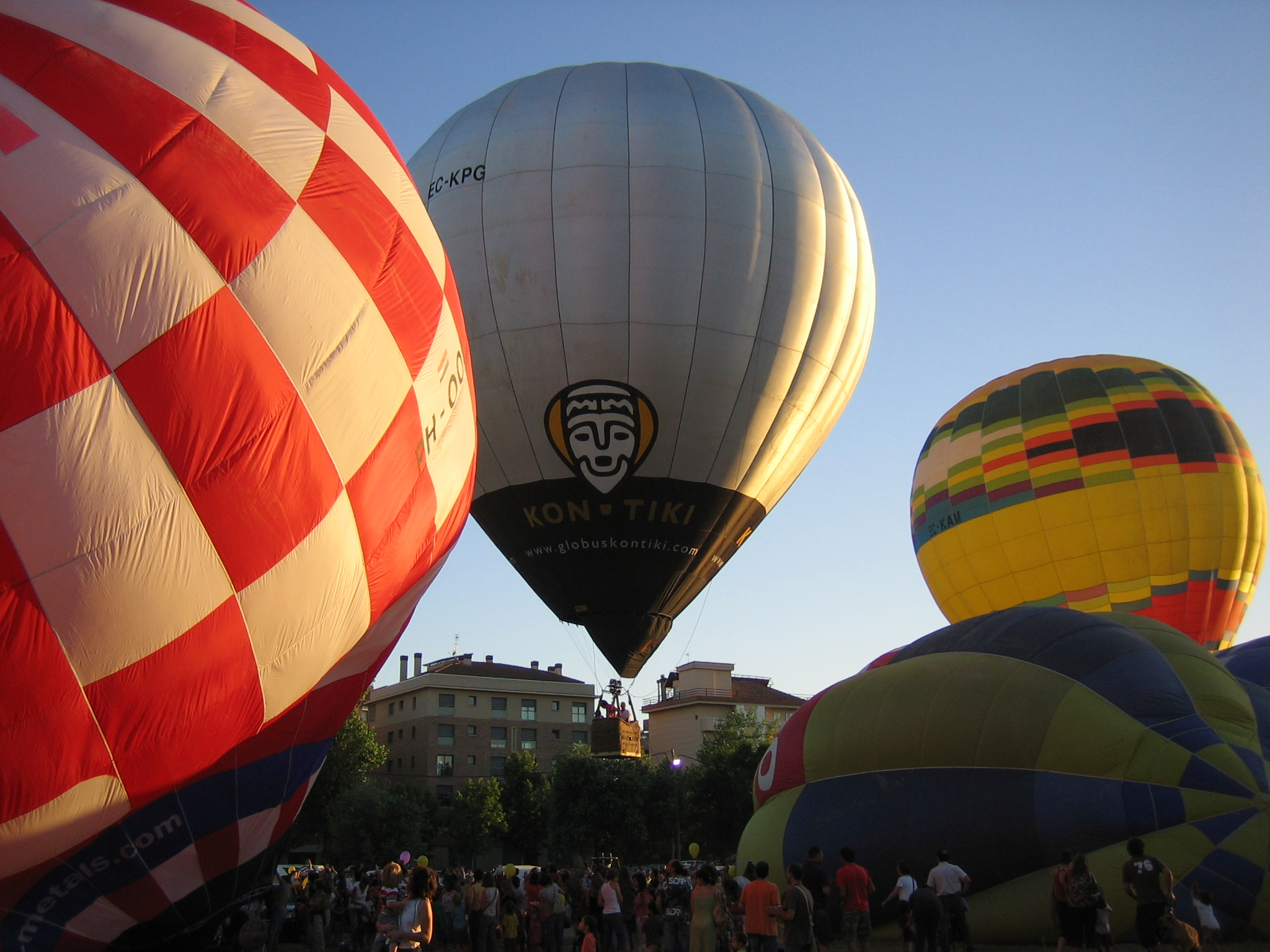
European Balloon Festival in Igualada, Spain

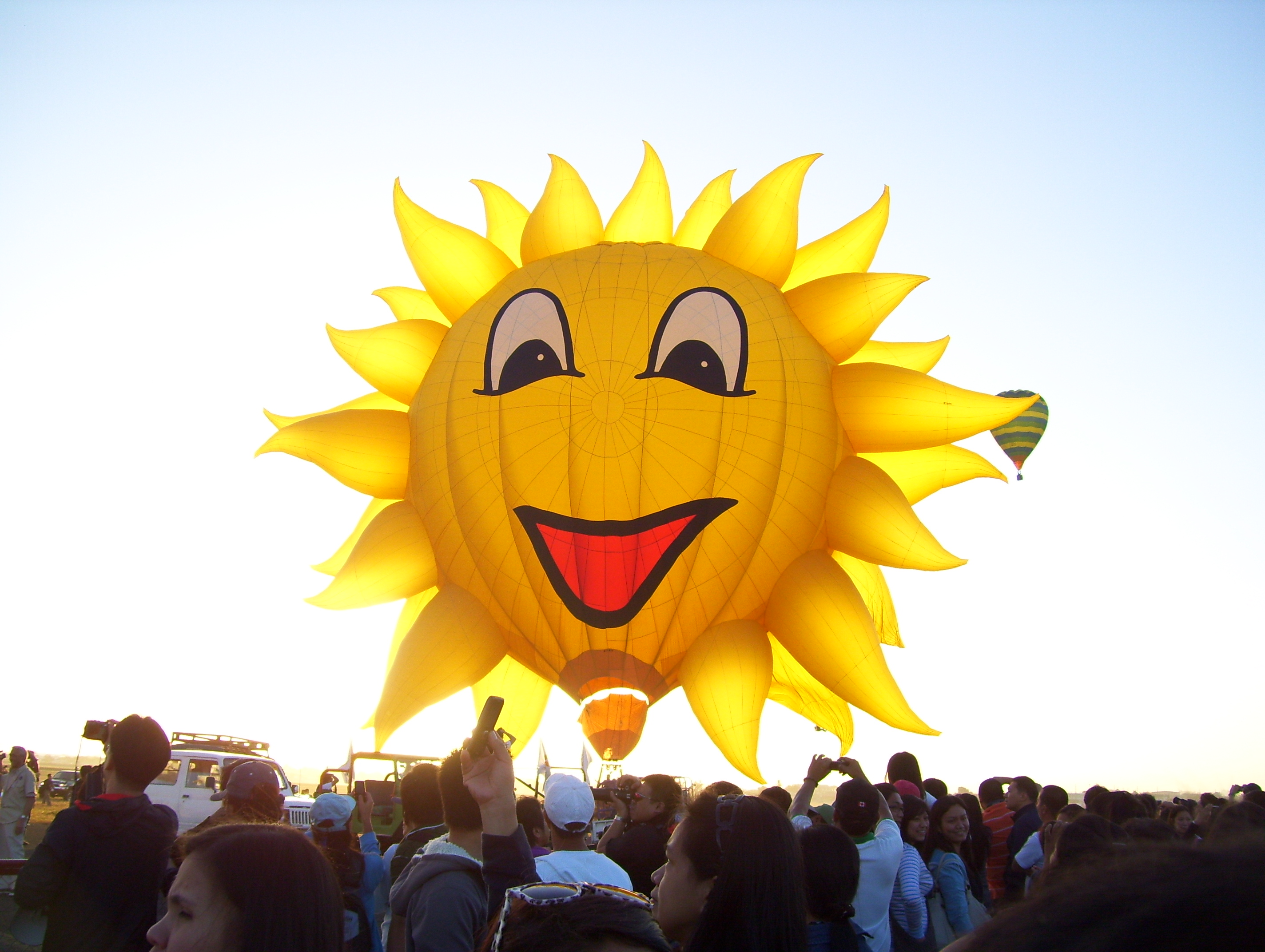
A "smiling sun" hot air balloon in front of the sun during the Philippine International Hot Air Balloon Fiesta in Pampanga, Philippines

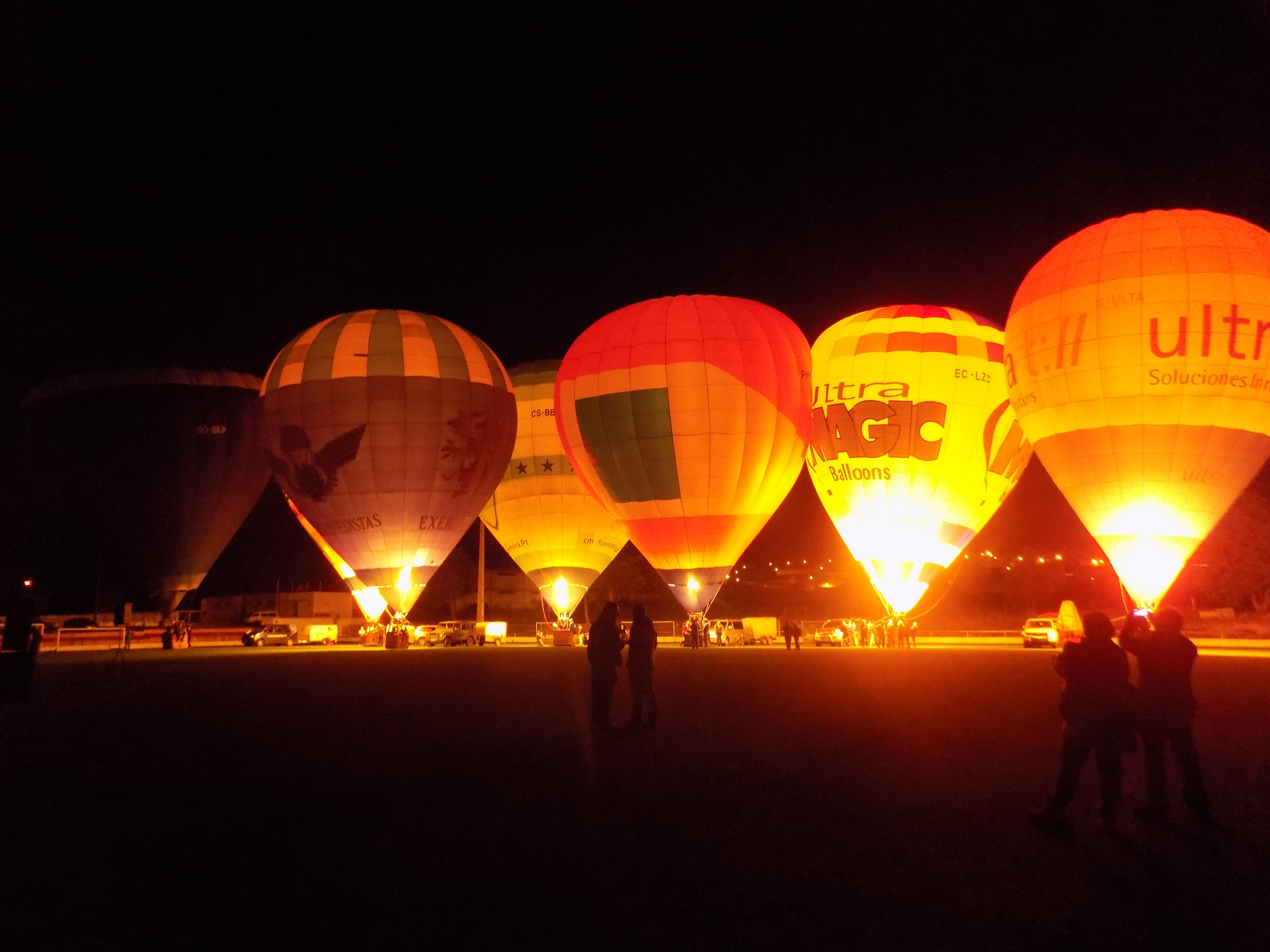
Night Glow at the 20º Hot Air Balloon Festival (FIBAQ) in Alter do Chão, Portugal, on 11 November 2016

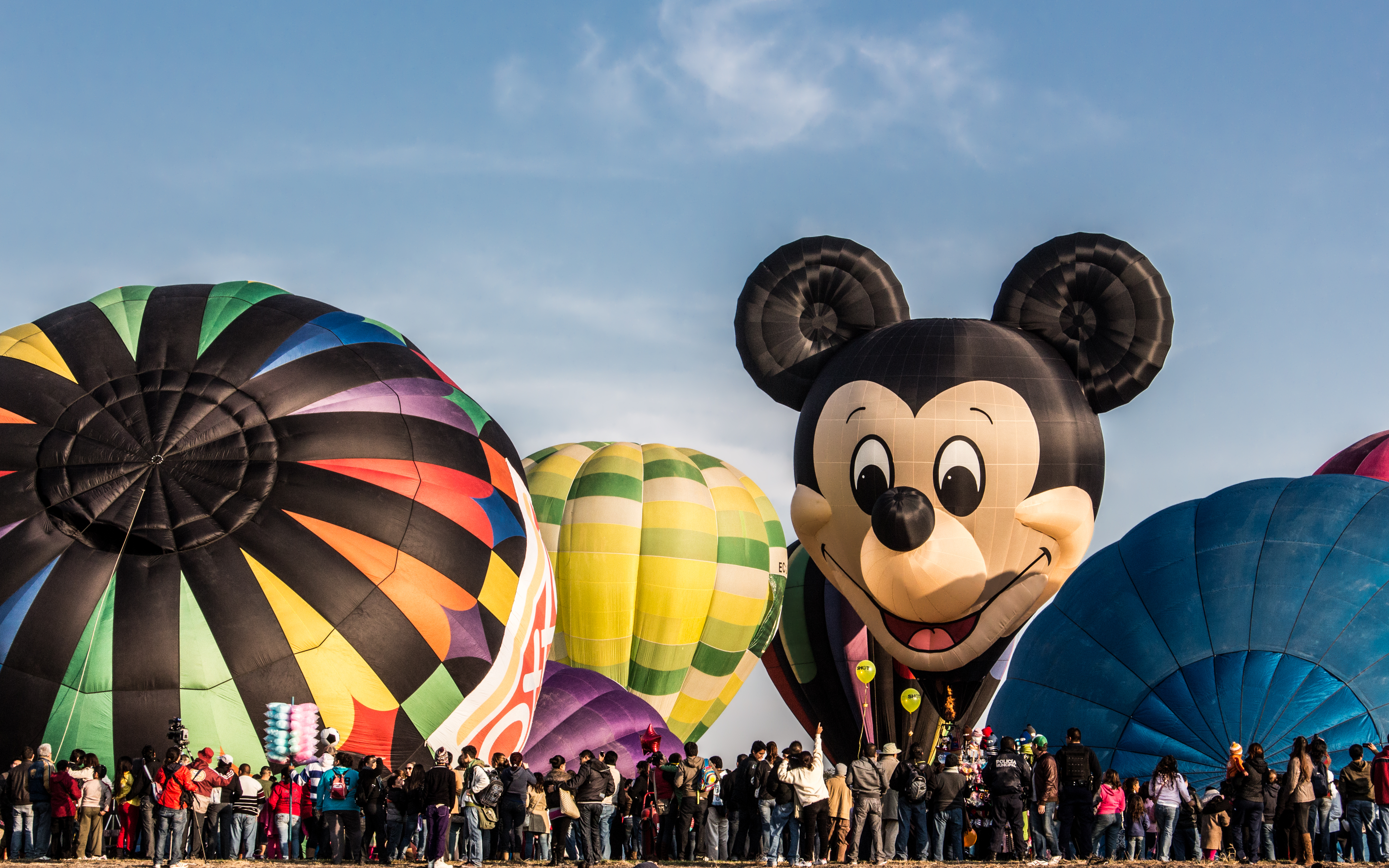
Leon International Hot Air Balloon Festival 2012 in Leon, Mexico

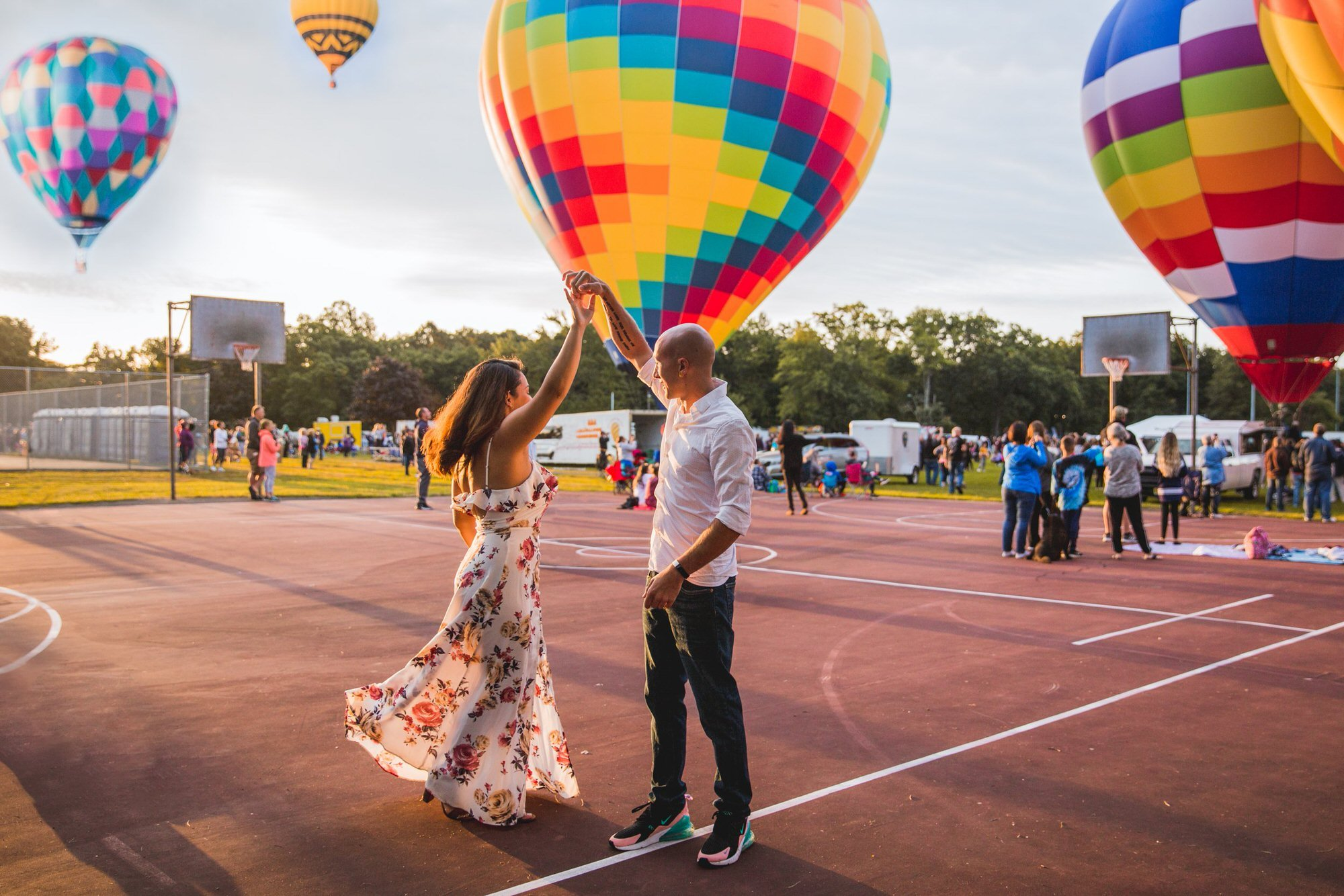
A sunrise photo session at the Plainville Hot Air Balloon Festival in Connecticut

Hot air balloon "Carpe Diem!" rising during the 2026 Ashland, Ohio, BalloonFest

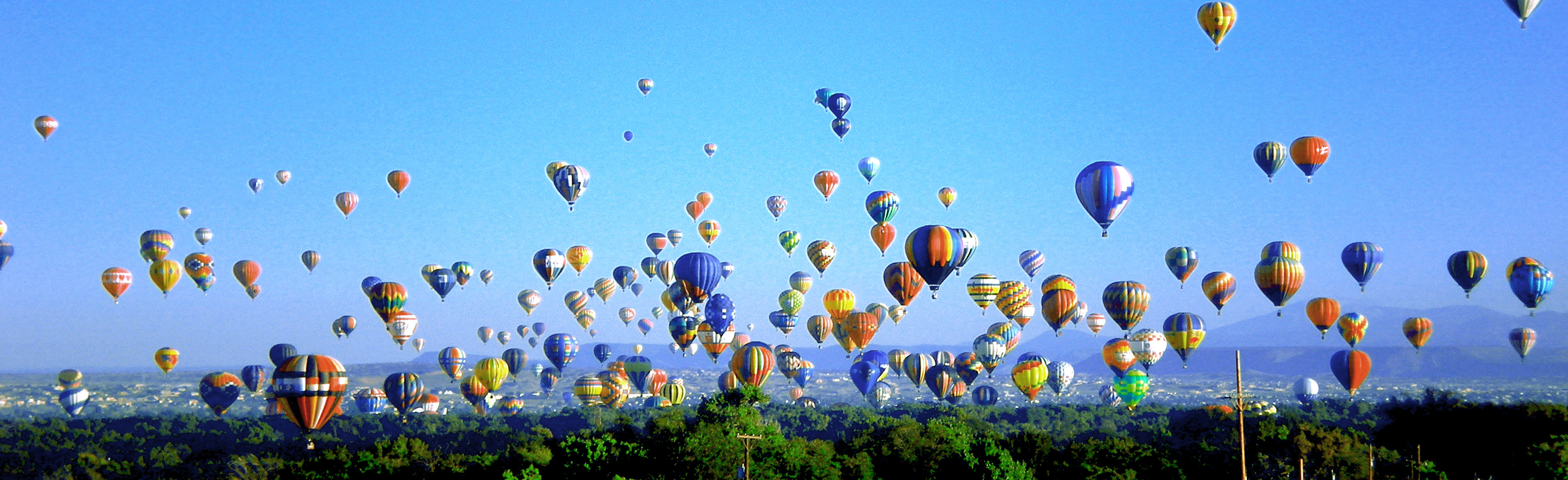
Albuquerque International Balloon Fiesta, 2007

== See also ==
- Air show
