= Warren County Farmers' Fair Balloon Festival =

Annual event in New Jersey, United States

Coordinates: 40.7245°N 75.1442°W

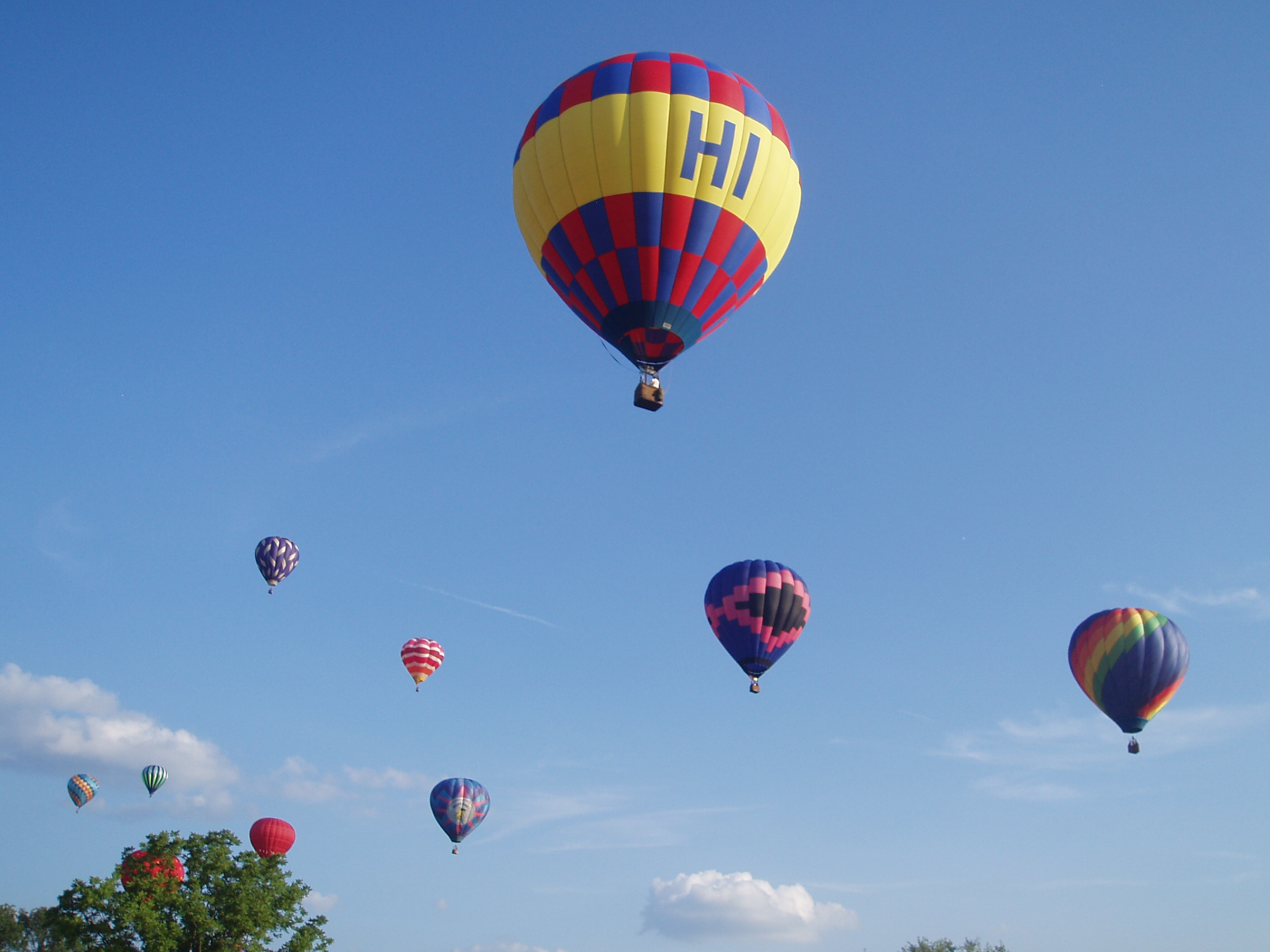
various hot air balloons during the festival

The Warren County Farmers' Fair Balloon Festival was started in 2001 and takes place during the week of the County Fair in Warren County, New Jersey. The Fair itself was established in 1937 by the Warren County Farmers' Fair Association. The event is a non-profit 501(c)6, agriculture in nature.

The balloon festival was started by pilot Fred Grotenhuis, who has flown Hot air balloons since the mid 1980's. The festival began with approximately 15 balloons and to date has grown to about 30 balloons. The event features some balloon races, including the typical hare and hound races, in addition to the Bicycle Balloon Race.

The festival was not held from 1942 to 1944 during World War II.
