= Philippine International Hot Air Balloon Fiesta =

Annual four-day air-sporting event in Pampanga, Philippines

Philippines International Hot Air Balloon Festival
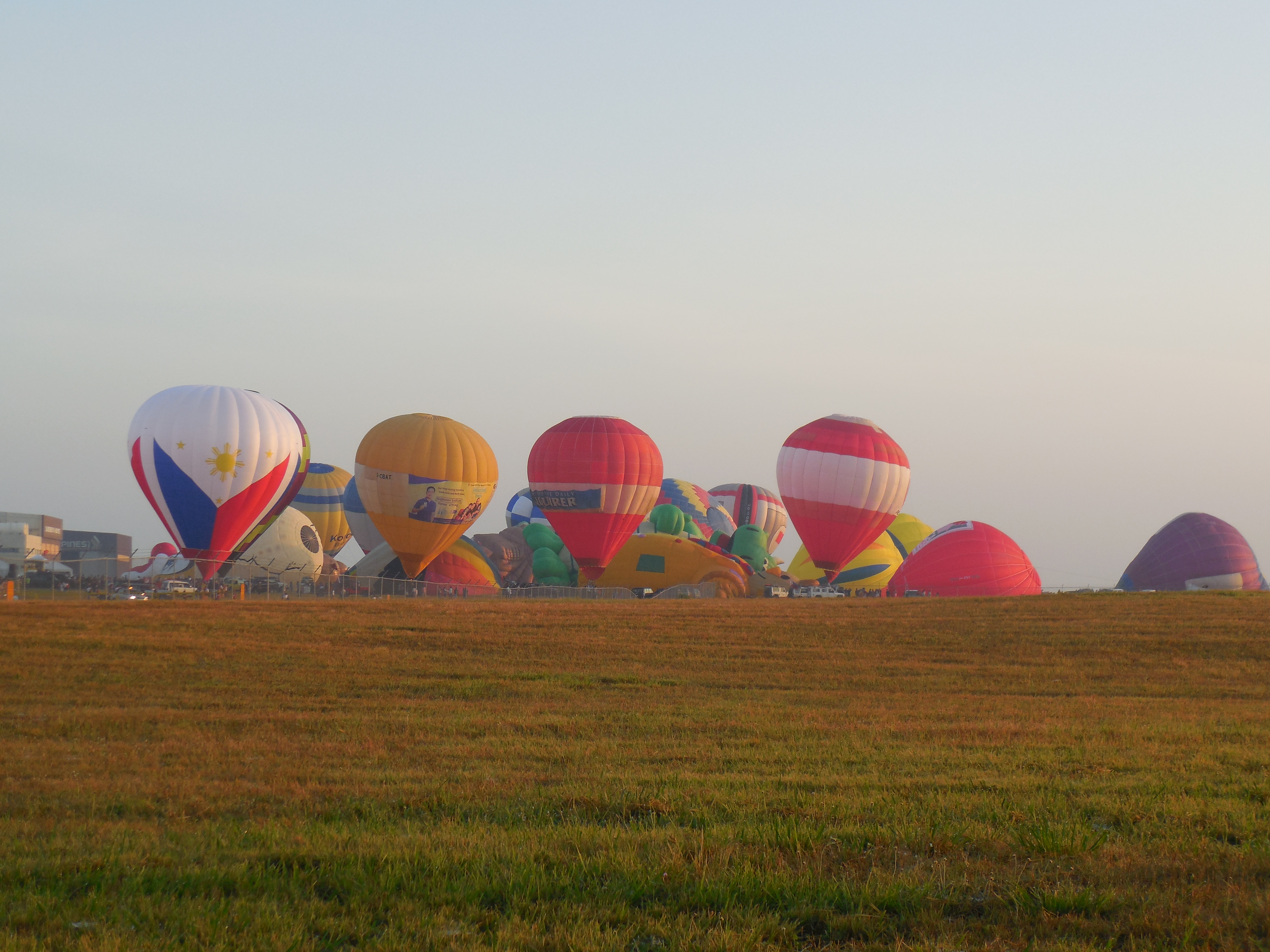
- Balloons being inflated during the 20th Festival
- Genre: Hot air balloon festival
- Dates: Every February
- Frequency: Annual
- Locations: Clark Freeport Zone, Pampanga (1994–2018); New Clark City, Tarlac (since 2024)
- Country: Philippines
- Founded: 1994
- Attendance: approx. 100,000
- Website: https://www.philballoonfest.net

The Philippine International Hot Air Balloon Fiesta (PIHABF) is an annual four-day air-sporting event that takes place between January and February at the Clark Freeport and Special Economic Zone.

It is one of the longest-running aviation sports events in the Philippines. The fiesta hosts over 100 balloon pilots from around the world and attracts approximately 100,000 visitors annually.

From 1994 to 2018, it was usually held at the Clark Freeport Zone in Pampanga.

== History ==
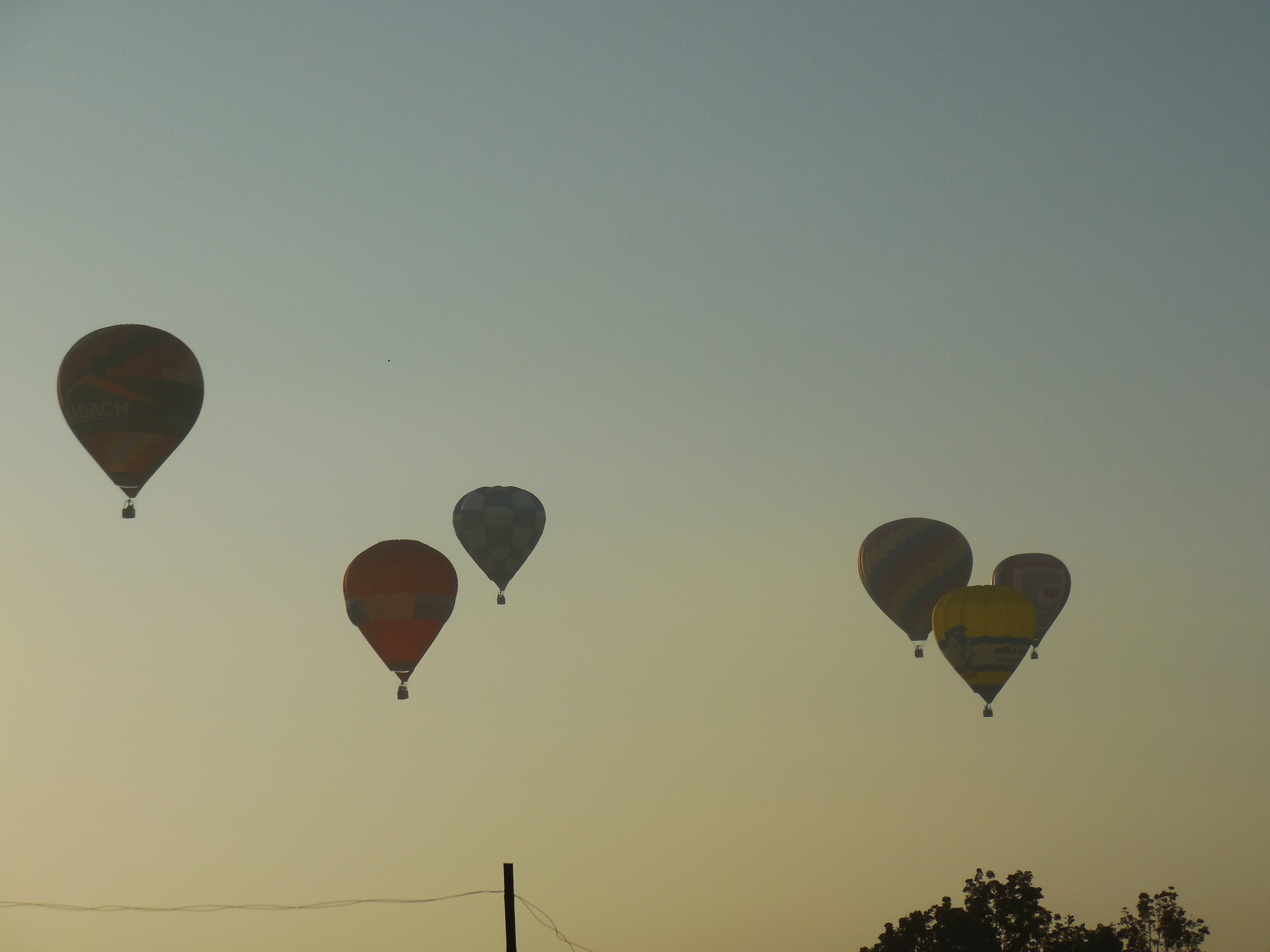
Hot air balloons fly over Clark Freeport Zone during the 20th Fiesta.

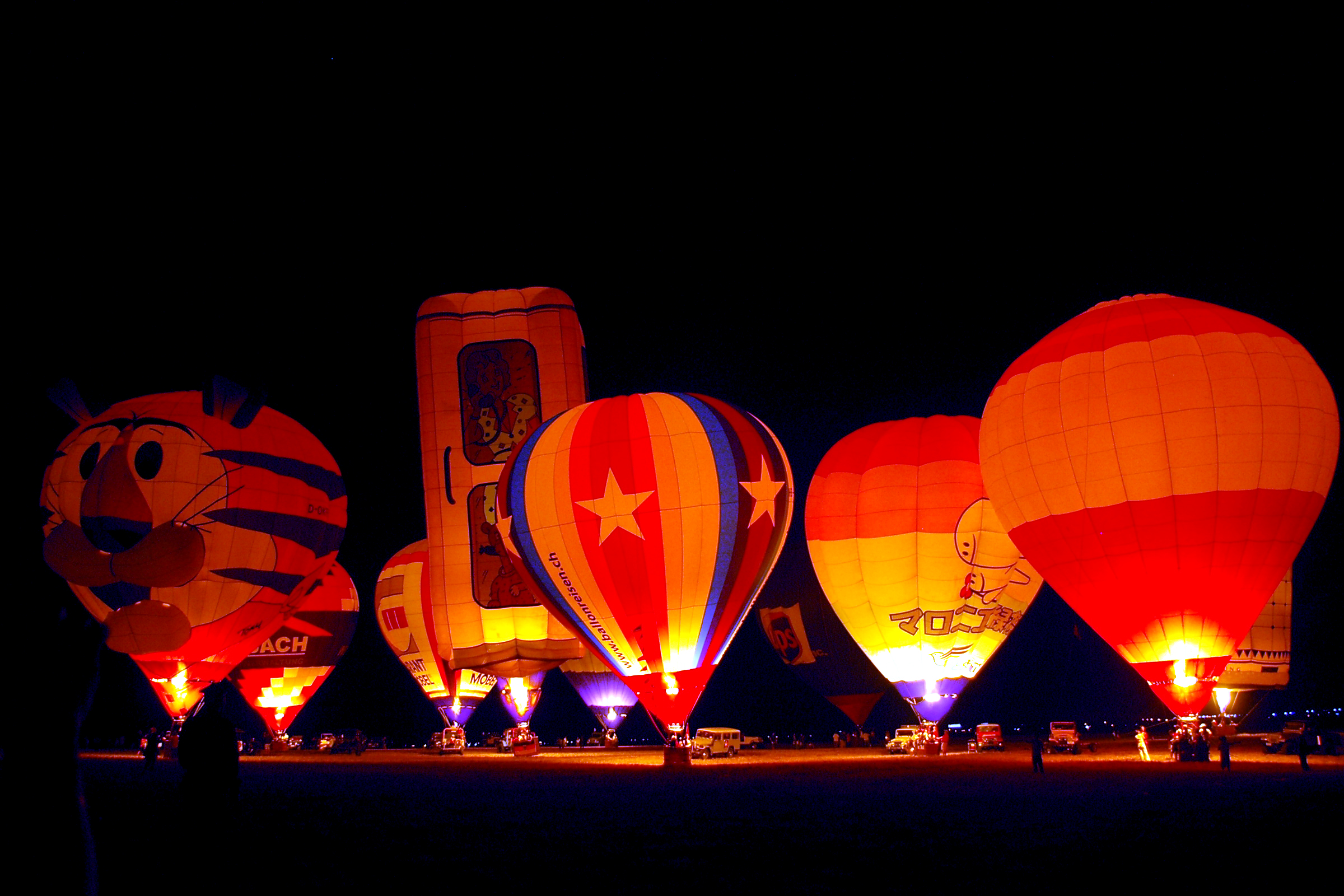
Night glow display: Hot Air Balloon Festival in Clark Freeport Zone, Pampanga

The Philippine International Hot Air Balloon Fiesta (PIHABF) was first hosted in 1994 at the Clark Parade Grounds in Clark Freeport Zone in Pampanga as an initiative of then Tourism Secretary Mina Gabor, John Emery of British Airways, and South Korean ballonist Sung Kee Paik. It was meant to help nearby communities recover from the 1991 eruption of Mount Pinatubo.

From its inception the festival is an international event with the inaugural edition seeing 21 hot air balloon pilots from eleven countries Angeles City became known for the PIHABF.

The event was held annually until 1998. It was not held in 1999 due to funding issues and concerns that it could affect flights from the Clark International Airport. The annual event returned in 2000.

The festival was not held in 2014 with the Department of Tourism hosting a similar hot air balloon event in April of that year.

The festival was canceled in 2019 due to the organizers unable to secure commitment from its government partners in time. In 2020, the event was held at the San Lazaro Leisure Park in Carmona, Cavite, the first time it was held in the Calabarzon region outside its customary venue at the Clark Freeport Zone in Pampanga.

This followed a hiatus due to the COVID-19 pandemic with the event returning in 2024.

For the next five years from the 2024 edition, the festival will be held at the New Clark City in Capas, Tarlac. The Skydiving Philippine Flag Jump was held for the very first time.

== Summary ==
| Year | Edition | Venue | Ref. |
|---|---|---|---|
| 2011 | 16th | Clark Freeport Zone | |
| 2012 | 17th | Clark Freeport Zone | |
| 2013 | 18th | Clark Freeport Zone | |
| 2014 | Not held | | |
| 2015 | 19th | Clark Freeport Zone | |
| 2016 | 20th | Clark Freeport Zone | |
| 2017 | 21st | Clark Freeport Zone | |
| 2018 | 22nd | Clark Freeport Zone | |
| 2019 | Not held | | |
| 2020 | 23rd | San Lazaro Leisure Park | |
| 2021–2023 | Not held due to the COVID-19 pandemic | | |
| 2024 | 24th | New Clark City | |
| 2026 | 26th | New Clark City | |

== See also ==
- Hot air balloon festivals
