= Saxonia International Balloon Fiesta =

Hot-air balloon festival in Leipzig, Germany

Coordinates: 51°20′24″N 12°22′30″E

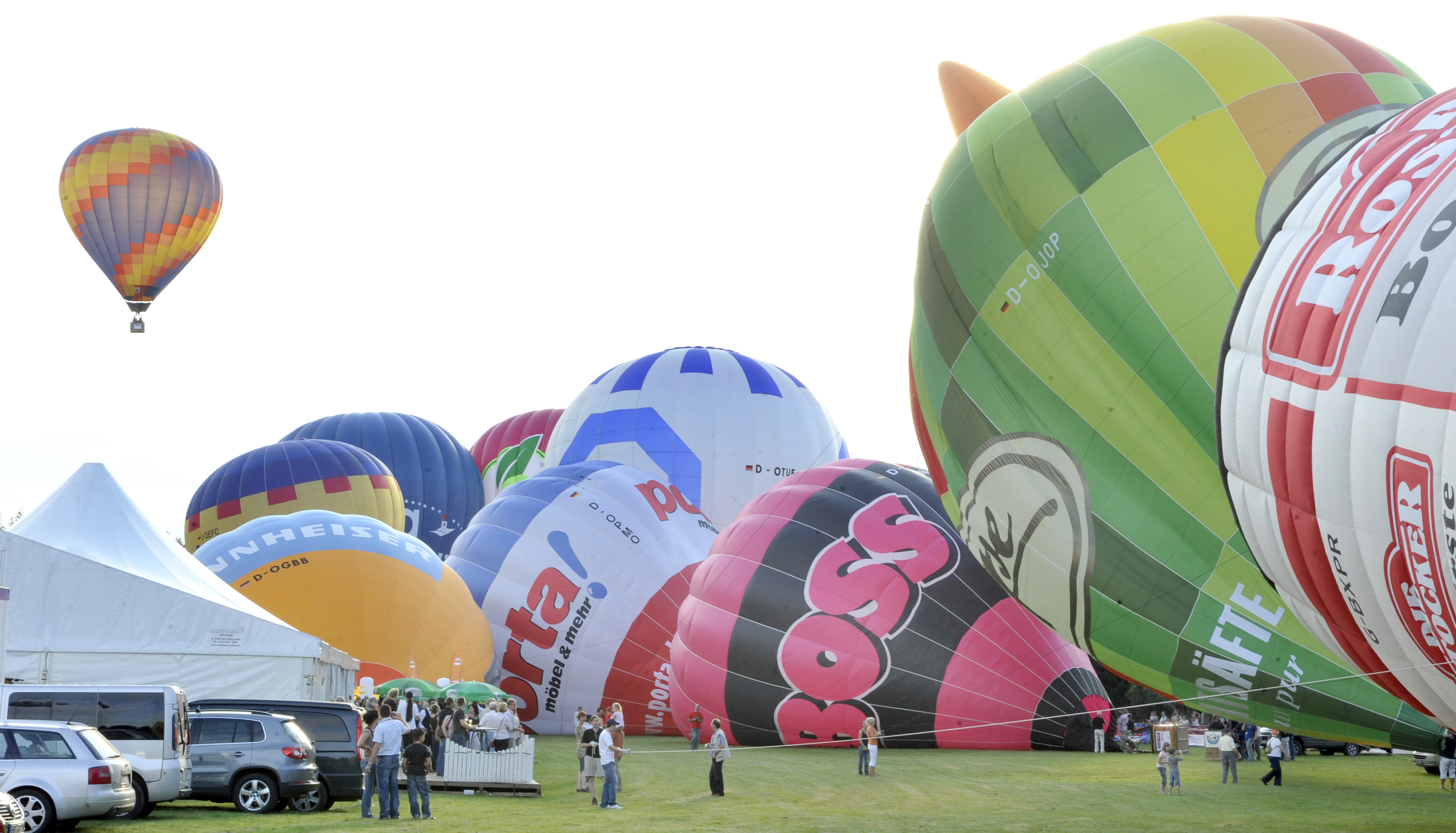
Balloon Fiesta 2009

The Saxonia International Balloon Fiesta is the third biggest hot-air balloon festival in Europe. Annually over 100,000 people visit the spectacle, which takes place in Leipzig (Germany) at the end of July.

The Fiesta is organised by a local Marketing agency, co-partner is the City of Leipzig. In 1995 the first Balloon Fiesta attracted 5000 visitors as a local event in Mügeln. In 1996 the festival was relocated to a recreation area close to Leipzig called „Silbersee“. This area lies beyond the air lanes of Leipzig. The spacious recreation area „Silbersee“ is situated between the urban areas of Loessnig (a district of Leipzig) and the open-pit landscape in the southern areas of Leipzig, which is currently in a process of recultivation and transfiguration. The public park „Silbersee“ has room for over one hundred balloons. Competitions between the hot-air balloons are essential at the Saxonia International Balloon Fiesta. The different kinds of competition-flights are: Fox hunting, Key grab and flying as far as possible. Most of the balloons are sponsored by large companies.

== See also ==
- Hot air balloon
- Hot air balloon festivals
