= Great Falls Balloon Festival =

Coordinates: 44.100283°N 70.214824°W

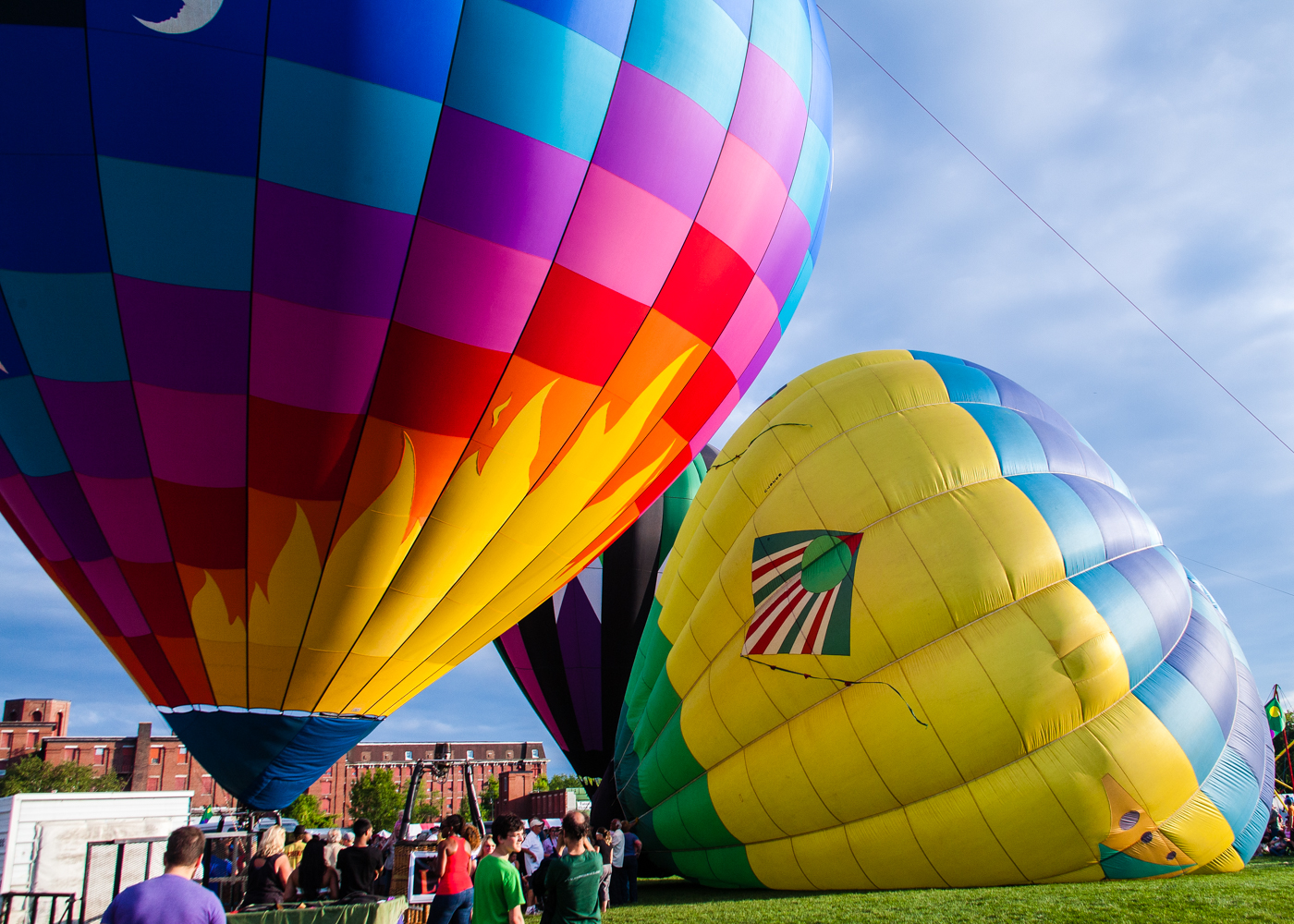
- 2023 Great Falls Balloon Festival in Lewiston, ME.
- Genre: Hot Air Balloon festival
- Dates: August 18th, 19th, 20th, 2023.
- Locations: Lewiston and Auburn, Maine
- Founded: 1997
- Attendance: 100,000 Annually
- Website: http://www.GreatfallsBalloonfestival.Org/

The Great Falls Balloon Festival is a hot air balloon festival held in the twin cities of Lewiston and Auburn, Maine. It has been held annually each August since 1993, although it was only held virtually in 2020, due to the COVID-19 pandemic. The festival, which is held on the banks of the Androscoggin River attracts up to 100,000 spectators each year. The festival features rides, games, music, and trade booths in the various parks and plazas where the balloons lift off.

In 2024, the Great Falls Balloon Festival board of directors decided not to hold the 30th anniversary festival due to "logistical issues, safety concerns, and other unexpected factors beyond our control." After negotiations with the City of Lewiston, the board to decided to relinquish control of the festival to allow the city to operate it for the year under a new name, the L/A Balloon Festival.

== See also ==
- List of hot air balloon festivals
