= Northampton Balloon Festival =

Annual hot air balloon festival in Northampton, England

Coordinates: 52.2456°N 0.8166°W

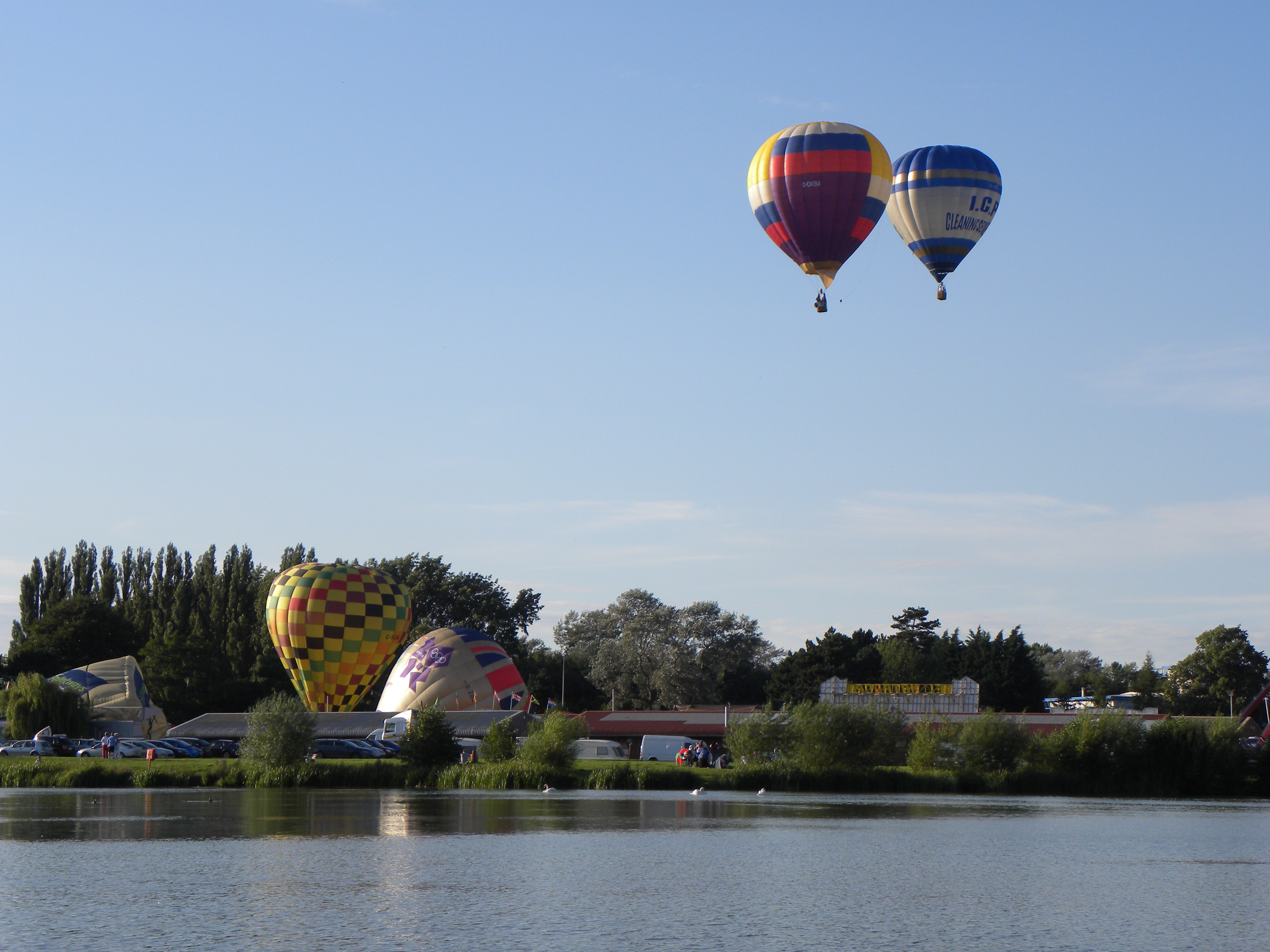
Balloons at the 2012 festival at Billing Aquadrome

The Northampton Balloon Festival is an annual hot air balloon festival held in Northampton, England.

The original festival was held in The Racecourse and managed by the (now defunct) Borough Council, and took place over a Friday, Saturday and Sunday in mid-August. The main features of the festival were the twice-daily hot air balloon lifts and a balloon glow, but other attractions included trade stalls, live music and arena entertainment.

== History ==
The first festival was held in 1989. The star attractions were the Chubb fire extinguisher and the Rupert The Bear balloons. In its early years The Northampton balloon was a roaring success with families encouraged to come and enjoy the weekend, looking at balloons and visiting various trade stalls across the park.

In 2001 the festival was joined with the Northampton Town Show (previously held during July) to become the Northampton Festival, but has since reverted to its original name.

The 2004 festival featured the Sugababes, Big Brovaz, and Ronan Keating.

The 2005 festival featured Frankie Goes to Hollywood, Rachel Stevens and Lemar.

The 2007 festival was a disaster due to poor attendance caused by bad weather on the last two days and the fact that the council decided to charge adults for admission, which discouraged many adults without young children from attending and spending money at the stalls.

The 2008 festival was scaled down from before, with fewer stalls, and featured Rick Astley and Signature but neither were able to revive the festival's fortunes and the event made a huge loss.

The Borough Council ceased its funding and in mid-2009 the festival was revived by new organisers and moved to Billing Aquadrome. It took place 14–16 August 2009 at the new location with free admission.

The 2010 Northampton Balloon Festival was once again based at Billing Aquadrome, however that year the organisers chose to charge entry. The Balloon Festival sat alongside an existing event, the American Car Show and included a variety of stalls and fairground rides.

In 2012, it was announced that Pure Leisure, the owners of Billing Aquadrome had agreed sponsorship of the event, for a further 3 years.

The Northampton Balloon Festival was held again on Friday 16th to Sunday 18 August 2013, 15-17 August 2014, 14–16 August 2015, 19–21 August 2016, 18-20 August 2017 and between 17 and 19 August 2018.

2019 saw the last Northampton Balloon Festival at Billing Aquadrome as they pulled out of hosting the event due to the limited number of flights over the previous two years' festivals, caused by adverse weather which restricted flying on those occasions.

In 2023 the Northampton Balloon Festival returned to The Racecourse park. Northampton Town Council (having replaced Northampton Borough Council) are responsible for organising the event.

== See also ==
- Hot air balloon festivals
- Bristol International Balloon Fiesta
- Lord Mayor's Hot Air Balloon Regatta
