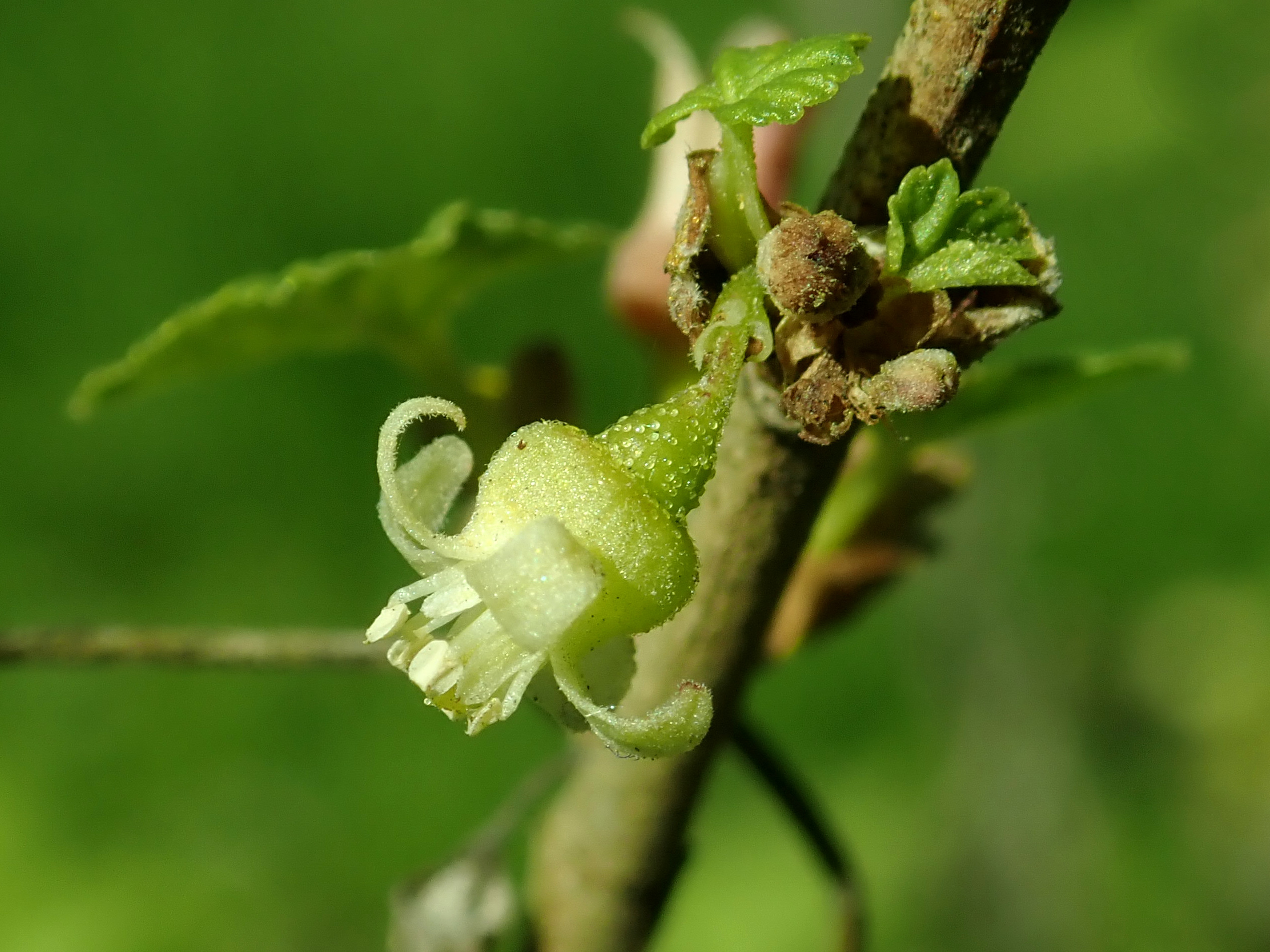
- (Berlin-Dahlem Botanical Garden)

Scientific classification
- Kingdom: Plantae
- Clade: Tracheophytes
- Clade: Angiosperms
- Clade: Eudicots
- Order: Saxifragales
- Family: Grossulariaceae
- Genus: Ribes
- Species: R. ussuriense

Binomial name
- Ribes ussuriense Jancz.

= Ribes ussuriense =

Species of fruit and plant

Ribes ussuriense (common name - Korean black currant) is an Asian species of Ribes (currant), first described in 1906 by Edward Janczewski (in 1904 the name alone was published) The species epithet, ussuriense, means that the species comes from Ussuri.

It is considered to be a synonym of Ribes procumbens by Plants of the World Online, which follows Chang, Kim & Chang (2014, 2021). However, it is considered to be a separate species by Russian authorities, and by the Korean National Species List (국가종목록).

== Description ==
It is a deciduous shrub growing to heights of about 1 m. its branches are green and covered with short hairs and glandular dots. The leaves are opposite, the petioles are 3–7 cm long and also have short hairs and glandular dots. The leaf blade is round, 4–8 cm long, 4–10 cm wide, and shallowly divided into 3–5 lobes. The leaf base is heart-shaped, and its margins are coarsely serrated. The veins on the front and back of the leaf have short hairs and glandular dots. The flowers occur in groups of 5–9 in short racemes from the ends of branches and leaf axils. The flower stalks are 3–5 mm long and have fine hairs. The light-yellow petals are ovate-lanceolate.

== Phenology ==
In Korea, it flowers in June, with its round berries ripening to black in August. The berries are edible.

== Distribution ==
It is native to the north of Korea (where it grows on highland plains) and to Sakhalin and Ussuri in Russia.
