= Byrsax spiniceps =

Scientific classification
- Kingdom: Animalia
- Phylum: Arthropoda
- Clade: Pancrustacea
- Class: Insecta
- Order: Coleoptera
- Suborder: Polyphaga
- Infraorder: Cucujiformia
- Family: Tenebrionidae
- Subfamily: Tenebrioninae
- Tribe: Bolitophagini
- Genus: Byrsax
- Species: B. spiniceps

Binomial name
- Byrsax spiniceps Lewis, 1894

Species of beetle

Byrsax spiniceps is a species of beetle in the subfamily Tenebrioninae, and the tribe Bolitophagini.

It was first described in 1894 by George Lewis.

GBIF lists Byrsax kimurai as a synonym. However Korean authorities regard these two species (B. spiniceps and B. kimurai) as distinct.

It is observed in all seasons except winter, but mainly in spring and summer, on various mushrooms.

It is native to Korea (Gangwon, Gyeonggi), and to Japan.
