= The Racecourse, Northampton =

Park in Northampton, England

The Racecourse
- Racecourse, Racecourse Park
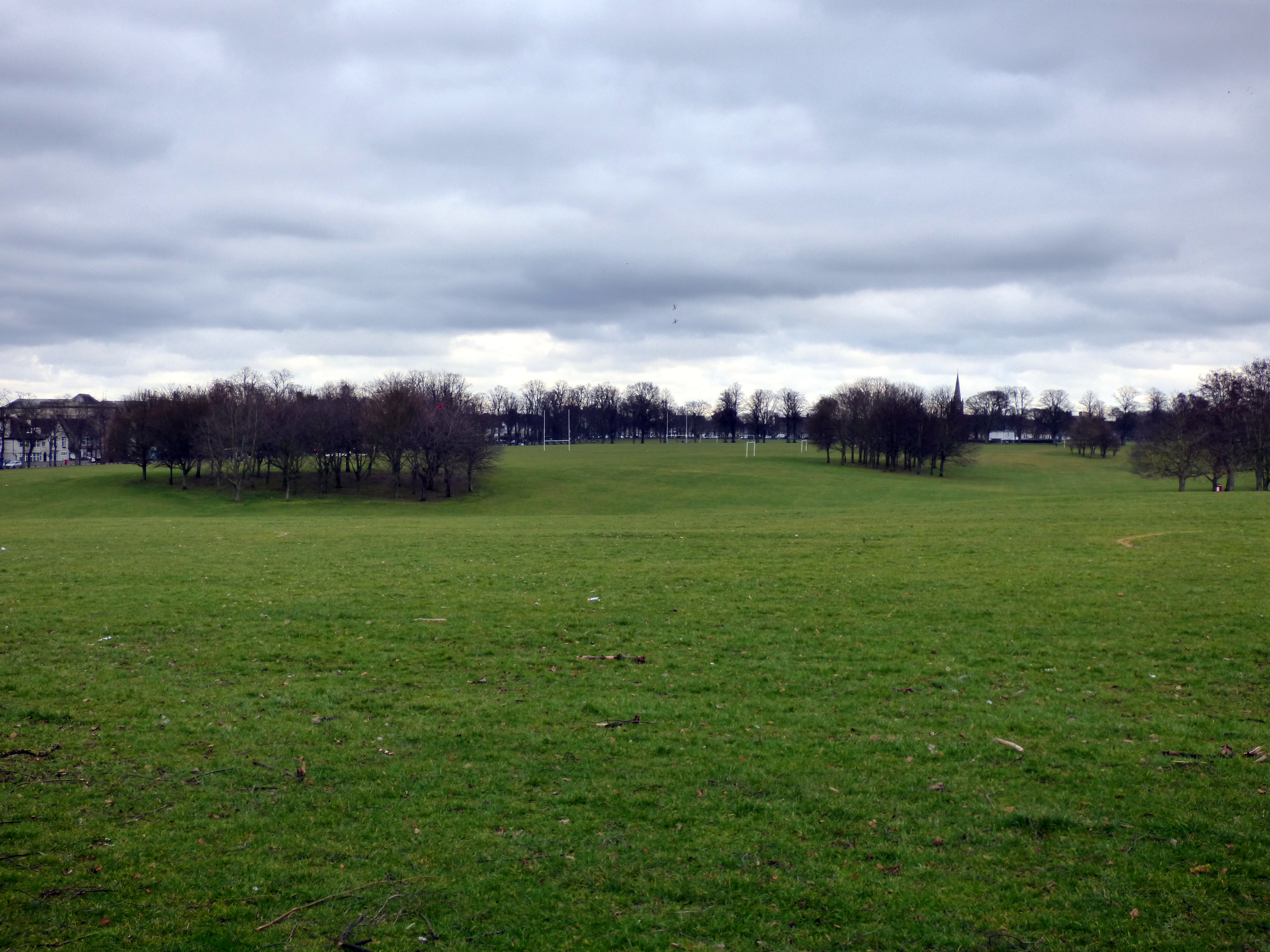

- Location within England
- Type: Open space park
- Location: Northampton
- Coordinates: 52°14′56″N 0°53′29″W
- Area: 118 acres (48 ha)
- Created: 1632

The Racecourse (also known as Racecourse or Racecourse Park) is an open space park situated in the centre of Northampton. It is the sports park for Northampton with football, rugby, bowls, tennis, and more. The park has many paths connecting different areas and over 100 streetlights. It is surrounded by the Mounts, Kingsley and Semilong estates.

Due to the links of the Racecourse to Northampton's history, it remains one of the town's famous landmarks. The Racecourse did hold regular horse racing meetings. However, these ceased in 1904.

== Geography ==
Located about 500 metres to the north of Northampton town centre, The Racecourse comprises around 118 acres of parkland and includes public footpaths, changing rooms and open space. Access to the Racecourse from main roads includes via the Barrack Road (A508), Kingsley Road (A5095) and East Park Parade / Kettering Road (A5123). It can also be accessed from St George's Avenue (north-west), Colwyn Road, Beaconsfield Terrace and Leicester Street via the Mounts Estate.

== History ==
From 1632, unofficial race meetings were held at Northampton Heath, the name originally given to the area including the Racecourse (with a 1813 map referring to the site as 'The Race Ground'). Races continued here until 1904, when they were stopped due to the number of accidents.

The park is believed to have been used from 1778 to 1882 as an area where freemen had grazing rights under the 1778 Act of Enclosure. Between these dates the Racecourse was known simply as the Freeman's Common. In 1882 when Commoners lost their right to graze cattle, the land was sold on by the Northampton Corporation Act. The park was then used by the public as a general recreation ground.

Race meetings resumed in 1727, with the help of Lord Spencer, and in 1737 the first official race meet was held on the new course. The races were well-attended and frequently visited by royalty, including the Prince of Wales, later Edward VII. In 1844 new stands were erected on the site at a cost of more than £2000.

The racecourse was left-handed (anti-clockwise) around the park and a hotel was erected on the north-eastern corner of the park, now on the corner of Kingsley Road and Kingsley Park Terrace. The hotel known then as the Kingsley Park Hotel was built in 1883. It served at first as a residential club for ardent racegoers, having been refused a licence until 1887. t was sold by the Jockey Club to a brewery in 1888 With closure of the racecourse in 1904 following a fatal accident involving spectators.the hotel was closed. The Jockey Club left it empty for eighteen years, Local residents started to refer to it as "The White Elephant" when it was initially refused a licence. The name White Elephant became the official name many years later. Gypsies camped along what was then known as Gypsy Lane (now Kingsley Road) where downhill towards Kingsthorpe the former "Romany" pub is situated.

=== Public executions ===
From 1715 to 1818, the park was frequently used for public executions. The Racecourse has been the scene of hundreds of hangings. Condemned convicts were taken by cart to the gallows on the Racecourse. These marches were said to be intimidating and unruly, with huge crowds in attendance.

One of the most famous executions was that of four members of the Culworth Gang who operated for two decades until 1787. Two of the gang, William Pettifer (alias "Peckover") and Richard Law were caught by police at an inn in Towcester. It is reported the two had arrived with bags, which they said contained birds as they had been cockfighting, however the landlord discovered that the bags contained the notorious masks and smocks which the gang used to hide their identity. Eventually, following a robbery in Blakesley the pair were served with search warrants and police constables found stolen property. The gang admitted 47 offences and were hanged at midday on Northampton Racecourse on 4 August. 5,000 people turned up to witness the hanging as the Culworth Gang were said to have terrorised as far as Oxford.

As was the fashion of the time, the condemned were supplied with drink at the last inn on the way to the Racecourse — the Bantam Cock on Abington Square. The last executions on the Racecourse took place on Friday, March 27th 1818 and were those of James Cobbett and George Wilkin found guilty of passing forged bank notes. As usual, a large crowd assembled to witness the scene.

=== 20th century ===
Before the turn of the 20th century, race meetings held were becoming increasingly dangerous leading to yet more fatal accidents with jockeys and spectators due to the Racecourse's 'pathways across the course, roving spectators and the sharpness of the bends'. Racing was suspended on 31 March 1904 prior to being permanently withdrawn the following September.

By 1912, the council had turned the area into a sports recreation ground. During the First World War the park was used as an army base for the Welsh Division and other army divisions and units. The Welsh Division included 16,000 men (of whom about half were billeted in houses in the town) and 7,000 horses. Waggons and field guns were parked on the Racecourse and the surface churned up.

In 1917 the park was ploughed up for wartime allotments, and in 1923 a new playground was built (on the side next to East Park Parade) as well as changing rooms and a restaurant converted from the old Racecourse stand and law houses which to this present day stands as the Jade Pavilion (circa 1930), a Grade II listed building.

At the White Elephant junction, a tram shelter was built in 1924 which would have been used to serve the electric tram system up the Kettering Road. However motor buses were said to have been already used in 1923 leaving the shelter redundant.

During the Second World War, the Racecourse was again used as a barracks. In 1941, a Stirling bomber crashed into Gold Street in the town centre. Wreckage spread to George's Row but did not affect All Saints Church. The bomber's crew had baled out over Northampton and a body later found on the Racecourse was said to be that of the pilot.

The park was returned to its now green state sometime between 1942 and 1948. Military infrastructure was still positioned on the site in 1947. Football, bowls, cricket and rugby once again became the activities commonly played on the Racecourse.

=== Modern-day history ===
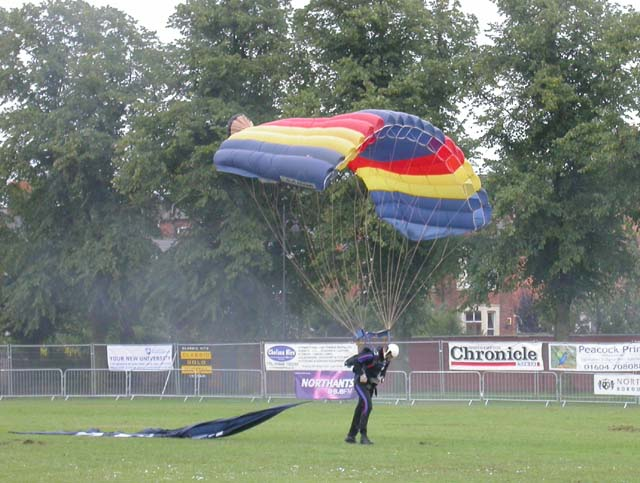
A Royal Air Force parachutist at the 16th Annual Balloon Festival

In 1974, the park was used as the venue for an international heat of the Eurovision contest Jeux Sans Frontiers. From 1990 to 2008, the Racecourse held the Northampton Balloon Festival each August. The festival drew tens of thousands of people and was seen as a similar event held on a larger scale in Bristol. Due to poor attendances due to a combination of bad weather and festival income, the council moved the festival to Billing Aquadrome in 2008. The Balloon Festival returned to the Racecourse in 2023.

The Umbrella Fair which now has a base at the Pavilion building held an annual event up to 2017 boasting over 10 stages, arts and family events with over 20,000 visitors every August.

The Northampton Carnival is held here each summer with floats coming in from nearby towns as well as local groups getting involved.

== Sporting activities ==
The Racecourse remains one of the most popular places in Northampton for a wealth of different sports. Each one has a website or online links. From amateur football, basketball, cricket, rugby union, tennis, Parkrun, Gaelic football fitness and bowls. Over twenty Sunday League football teams use the park as their venue each weekend from early autumn to late spring. The changing rooms were redesigned to meet F.A. standards

In 2022 the Basketball courts were totally updated to the 3 × 3 layout and had effective flood lighting added for extended play. Regular tournaments are organised on the 6 pitches each marked in a different colour. In 2007 £1 million was spent on new changing room facilities adjacent to the Colwyn Road end behind the Jade Pavilion. Prior to that, the Pavilion was used by players as changing rooms. These are near the basketball courts and now have a defibrillator and blood box for use in emergencies located here.

In 2010 the council spent £85,000 on the central adventure park space including a zip wire, climbing frame complex and five-person buddy swing. A Parkrun takes place each week comprising two laps of the racecourse.

== Use in everyday Northampton ==
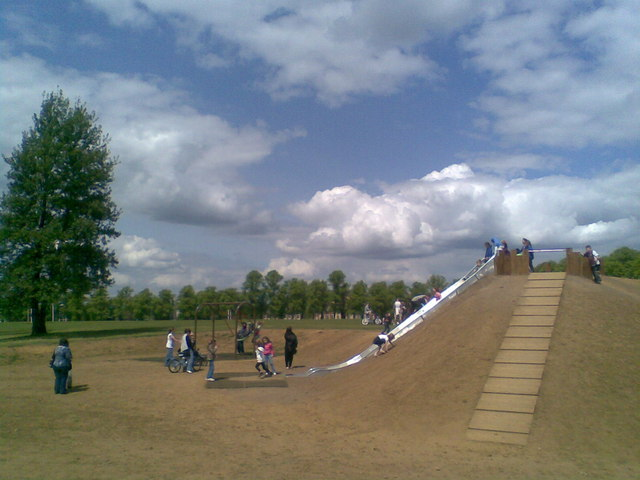
Playground at the Racecourse

Thousands of members of public use the park each week, crossing it for work or to going to school or college, stopping there for a break in the green space or playing sports and games. The Friends of Northampton racecourse are a committee of volunteers that meet with the local council and other bodies to help with the running of the park.

The Umbrella Fair Cafe and The Medieval Restaurant are both in the Listed Pavilion Building. Car parking is situated adjacent to the building. Umbrella Fair is home to a cafe, public toilets and is a group that is involved with local arts and community projects.

The Garden in the Park is being created in the centre surrounding the previously unkempt White Building. It's a work in progress and has been a joint project with Groundworks UK and the local park ranger. Several schools and other local groups too. It will have an orchard, grow fruit and vegetables and be an on going project.

== Crime ==
Often blamed for its proximity to the town centre by authorities, the Racecourse has attracted a reputation as an area with high crime levels.

On 22 June 1997 22-year-old Ryan McEwen King was sexually assaulted and murdered in bushes around the basketball courts on the Racecourse after walking back at night from a nearby pub. Her killer Raymond Ellis was later jailed.

In 2006, the park regularly made front-page news locally for its high levels of day and night-time robberies and assaults, leading to the Northampton Chronicle & Echo newspaper setting up The Friends of Northampton Racecourse (FONR). The partnership looked at reclaiming the Racecourse from the criminals, with its campaign eventually gaining respect from a national broadsheet The Guardian. The group continues to support the park's heritage and image.
