= Byrsax coenosus =

Scientific classification
- Kingdom: Animalia
- Phylum: Arthropoda
- Clade: Pancrustacea
- Class: Insecta
- Order: Coleoptera
- Suborder: Polyphaga
- Infraorder: Cucujiformia
- Family: Tenebrionidae
- Subfamily: Tenebrioninae
- Tribe: Bolitophagini
- Genus: Byrsax
- Species: B. coenosus

Binomial name
- Byrsax coenosus Pascoe, 1860

Species of beetle

Byrsax coenosus is a species of beetle in the subfamily Tenebrioninae, and the tribe Bolitophagini. It is the type species for the genus.

It was first described in 1860 by Francis Polkinghorne Pascoe from a specimen found in Singapore.
