= Byrsax egenus =

Scientific classification
- Kingdom: Animalia
- Phylum: Arthropoda
- Clade: Pancrustacea
- Class: Insecta
- Order: Coleoptera
- Suborder: Polyphaga
- Infraorder: Cucujiformia
- Family: Tenebrionidae
- Subfamily: Tenebrioninae
- Tribe: Bolitophagini
- Genus: Byrsax
- Species: B. egenus

Binomial name
- Byrsax egenus Pascoe, 1866

Synonyms
- Byrsax coxi Carter, 1914

Species of beetle

Byrsax egenus is a species of darkling beetle in the subfamily Tenebrioninae, and the tribe Bolitophagini.

It was first described in 1866 by Francis Polkinghorne Pascoe. B. coxi is considered a synonym.
