= Ashton Court =

Mansion house and estate to the west of Bristol in England

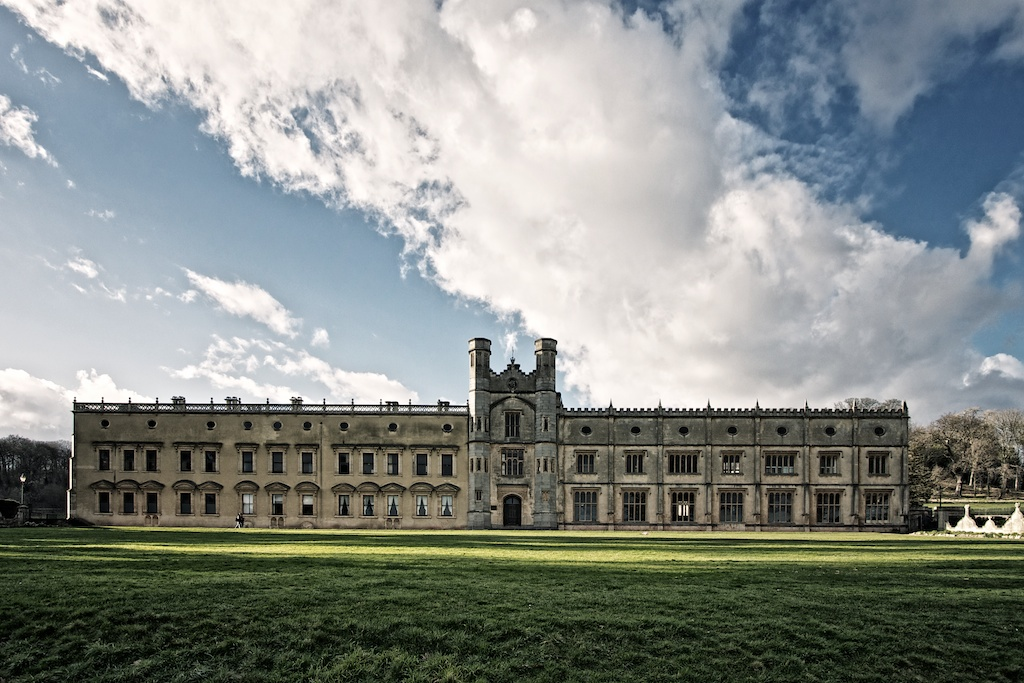

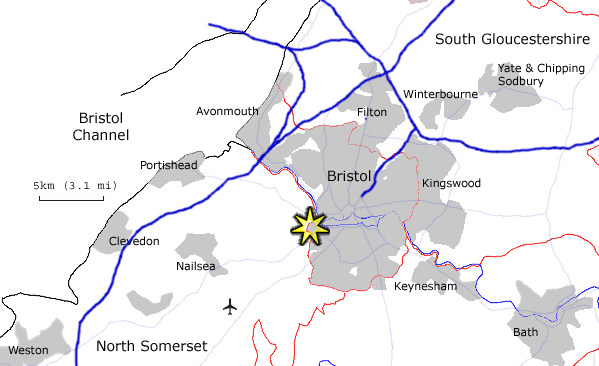
- Location within Somerset Location within Bristol

General information
- Architectural style: Mixed
- Location: Bristol, England
- Coordinates: 51.4479°N 2.6446°W
- Construction started: 1633
- Client: Smyth family

Ashton Court is a mansion house and estate to the west of Bristol in England. Although the estate lies mainly in North Somerset, it is owned by the City of Bristol. The mansion and stables are a Grade I listed building. Other structures on the estate are also listed.

Ashton Court has been the site of a manor house since the 11th century, and has been developed by a series of owners since then. From the 16th to 20th centuries it was owned by the Smyth family with each generation changing the house. Designs by Humphry Repton were used for the landscaping in the early 19th century. It was used as a military hospital in the First World War. In 1936 it was used as the venue for the Royal Show and, during the Second World War as an army transit camp. In 1946 the last of the Smyth family died and the house fell into disrepair before its purchase in 1959 by Bristol City Council. In the 21st century, the court remains in a poor state of repair, with large parts derelict and unusable, and in 2013 it was placed on the Heritage at Risk Register. In 2025 Historic England convened a meeting at the house to consider options for restoration.

The estate developed from the original deer park and is Grade II* listed on the Register of Historic Parks and Gardens of special historic interest in England. It is the venue for a variety of leisure activities, including the now-defunct Ashton Court Festival, Bristol International Kite Festival and the Bristol International Balloon Fiesta. It is home to a charity, The Forest of Avon Trust.

== Early history ==
Ashton Court dates back to before the 11th century. It is believed that a fortified manor stood on the site, given to Geoffrey de Montbray, Bishop of Coutances, by William the Conqueror. In the Domesday Book it is referred to as a wealthy estate owned by the Bishop of Coutances, with a manor house, a great hall, and courtyards entered through gatehouses. The property passed through successive owners and at the end of the 14th century it was considerably expanded when Thomas De Lions, a nobleman originally from France, obtained a permit to enclose a park for his manor. The house was owned by the Choke family for some time. In 1506 it was sold to Sir Giles Daubeney, a knight and a Chamberlain of Henry VII. Henry VIII gave the estate to Sir Thomas Arundel in 1541 and four years later in 1545 Sir Thomas sold it to the Bristol merchant, John Smyth. The Smyth family owned the property for the next 400 years. Smyth also bought the land which had been owned, until the dissolution of the monasteries, by Bath Abbey. He used the land to extend the deer park, bringing him into conflict with the residents of Whitchurch, who complained that he had used common land.

== Thomas and Florence Smyth ==
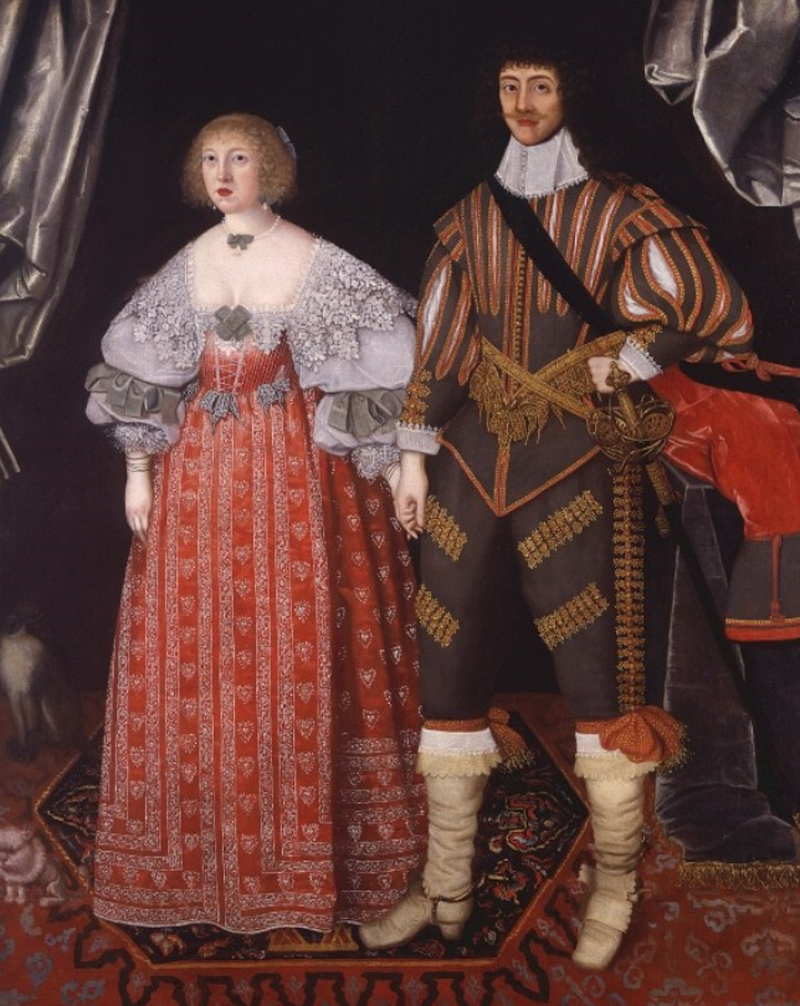
Thomas and Florence Smyth 1627

Thomas Smyth (1609–1642) was the first member of the family to make major alterations and additions to the original manor house. He was a Member of Parliament and a successful lawyer. In 1627, at the age of only seventeen he married Florence daughter of John Poulett, 1st Baronet Poulett of Hinton St George.

In 1635 Thomas added a new southern front which was in the style of Inigo Jones. It was described by Collinson in 1791 in the following terms:

The front is in length one hundred and forty three feet and consists below of three rooms; the western one of which is a fine apartment ninety-three feet long and twenty feet wide and contains several family and other portraits. The back part of the house is very ancient and the court leading to the park westward is called Castle Court from its having been embattled and still retaining an old gateway similar to those adopted in baronial mansions. The second court contains some of the offices and its entrance from without is under a low doorway between two lofty turrets one of which contains a bell and clock. The stables and corresponding offices in the front court are of ancient date. The whole contributes to a very venerable and picturesque building.

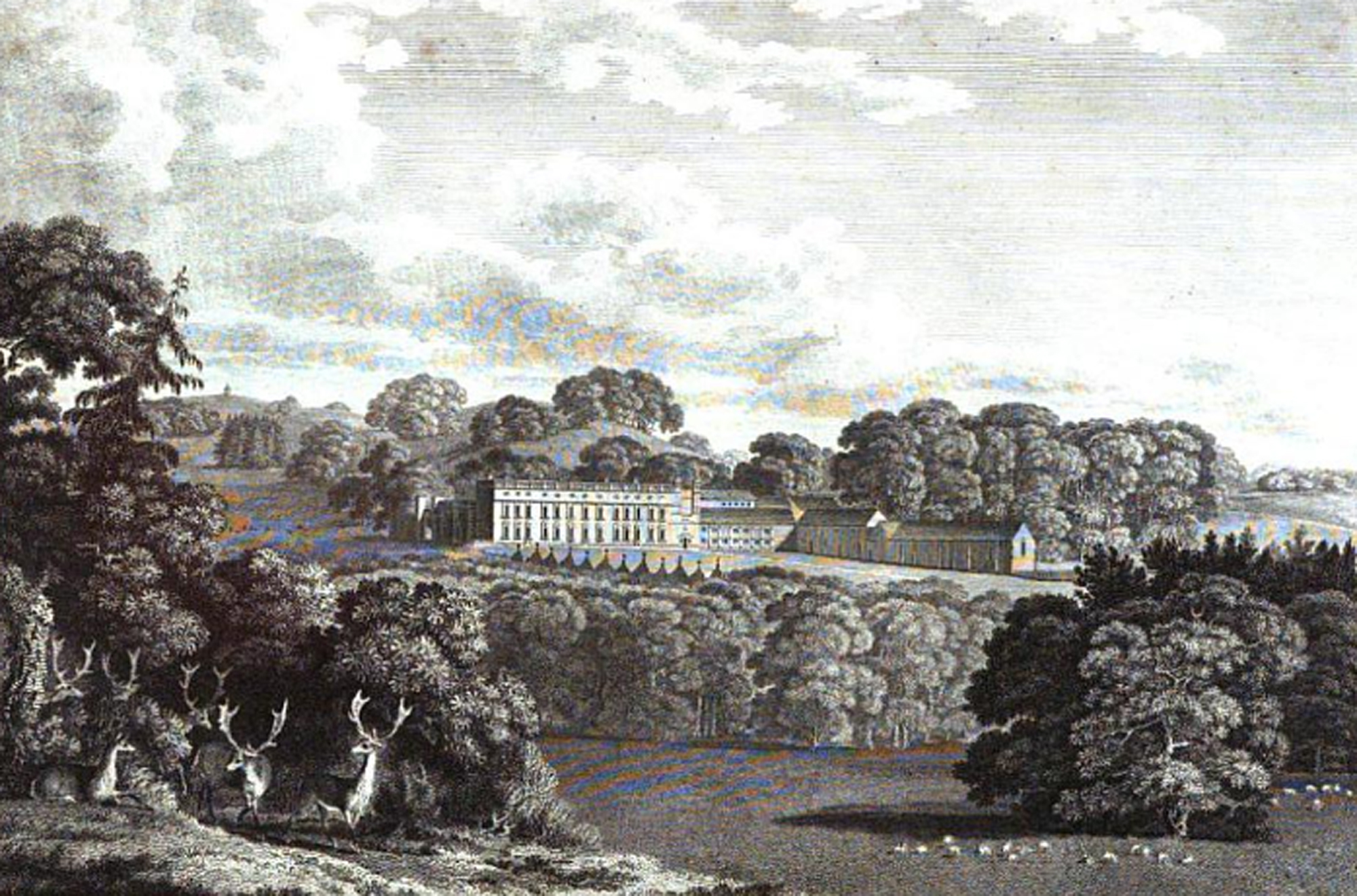
Ashton Court 1791

Further major additions were made to the building by Sir John Hugh Smyth (1734–1802). He inherited the estate in 1783 and added the new library to the north west of the house. Sir John also asked the famous landscape designer Humphry Repton for advice about the east front of the house. Repton drafted a plan but Sir John's death halted any further work on the house. However Repton's landscape designs were implemented by Sir John's successor Sir Hugh Smyth. In his book Humphry Repton gave a detailed description of the old and newer parts of the house before the library additions and included a drawing of the eastern front of the house as he saw it in about 1790.

== Sir John Smyth ==
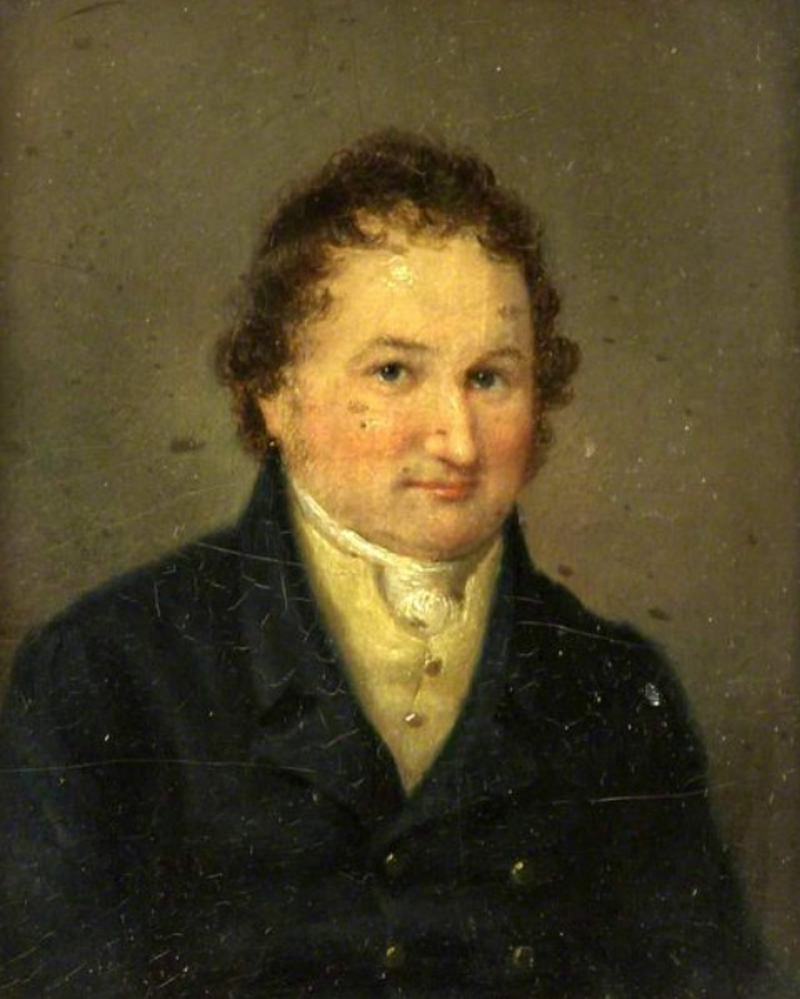
Sir John Smyth

As reported by Esme Smyth, Ashton Court's last resident, Sir John Smyth (1776–1849) was responsible for the remodelling of the house. In about 1940 she was interviewed by Raymond Gorges, who was researching a book, and she gave him an engraving of the house showing the additions that she said were made by Sir John.

Sir John was a bachelor. He was said, by Lady Emily Smyth, to be devoted to horses and kept an extensive stud. His importance as a major builder of Ashton Court is verified by John Evans who in 1828 wrote a book about Bristol and its surrounding area. He said:

This seat of Sir John Smyth is a stately edifice ... It has of late been much enlarged with stables nearly as extensive as the house and also a park enclosed by a wall which is twelve feet high in the lowest part. Two handsome lodges have also been added, one of them built from a gothic design.

== Sir Greville and Lady Emily Smyth ==
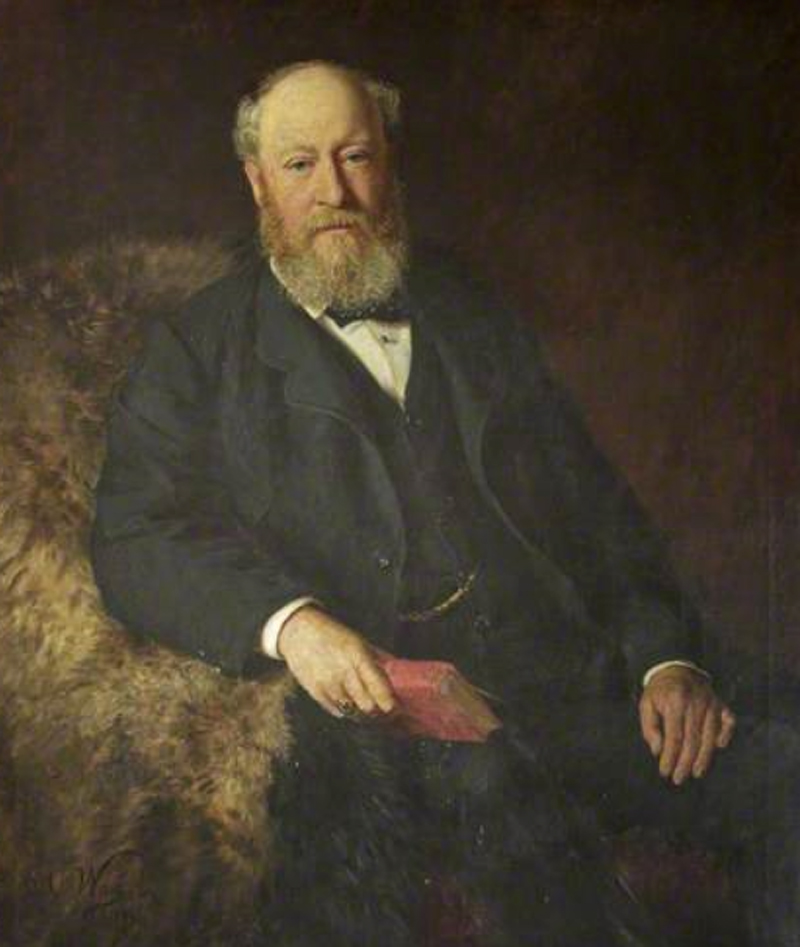
Sir Greville Smyth

Sir Greville Smyth inherited the property in 1852 and remained a bachelor until he was 48 years old. During that time he undertook extensive renovations. He also kept a very impressive garden which was described in detail in gardening magazines and newspapers.

In 1872 he commissioned the well-known architect Benjamin Ferrey to make additions which were described as follows:

The Western Wing has been rearranged but the principal parts of the works have been concentrated in the central portion of the buildings. This part has been raised considerably and in a great measure rebuilt and is surmounted by two octagonal towers which rise to a height of 72 ft. There is a covered passage running the south side of the courtyard which opens out into the court by the arcading of five bays.

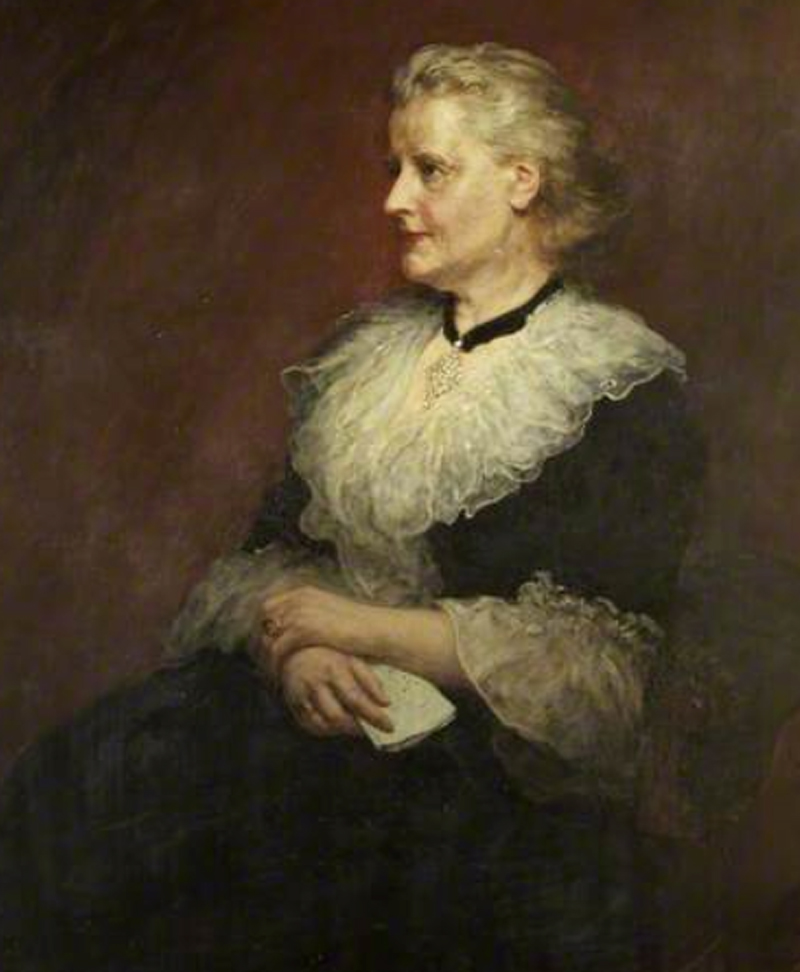
Dame Emily Smyth

Even more extensive alterations were made between 1884 and 1885. Shortly before he married Emily, the widow of George Oldham Edwards, he employed the notable Bath architect Major Charles Edward Davis to transform the house. The work took 18 months to complete. A detailed description of the alterations was given in the Bristol Mercury. in 1885. He converted the stables in the south east wing to living areas which included a huge museum for his natural history collection. He built a grand hall with richly carved oak panels. In the west wing he built a massive carved oak staircase with twist bannisters and introduced perpendicular windows. He also built a winter garden by enclosing the clock court. This is now the Winter Garden Bar. The following description of this elaborate room with a waterfall fountain is given in this newspaper article as follows:

This leads through two arched entrances to one of the most charming winter gardens of which any private mansion in the western counties can boast. It has been formed out of what was formerly the open clock tower court which has been supplied with a glazed iron roof. Round the tessellated flooring have been formed the gracefully curved flower borders edged with glazed tiling surmounted with rockery. This rock work covered with moss and filled in with water plants luxuriant grasses and ferns margins an ornamental sheet of water of serpentine form from the surface of which jets of water are thrown into a huge basin shell – one of the largest of the kind we have seen. It is ingeniously constructed to form a waterfall the streams descending to a second basin shell just above the sheet of water. Around this are some the choicest ferns and palms. From the roof hang clusters of incandescent laps, interspersed with baskets filled with gracefully drooping ferns and from the surface of the water lilies modestly rise.

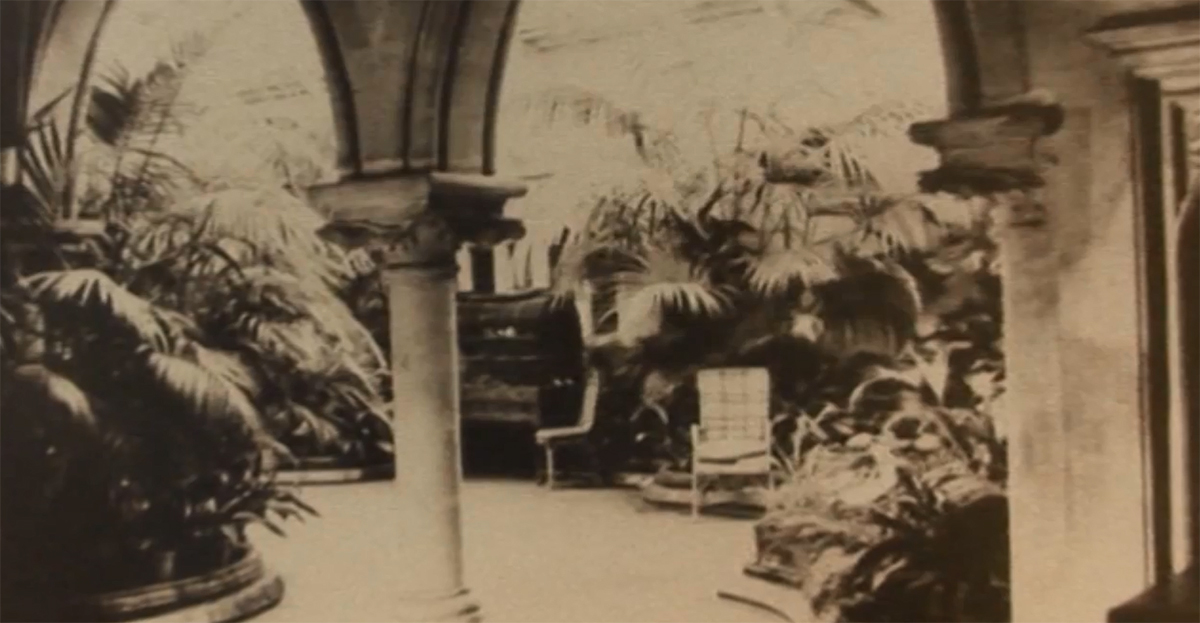
The Winter Garden.

Also in the 1880s 4 acres (1.6 ha) of formal gardens were laid out including a terrace garden, which is now a lawn, a wilderness garden with basin fountain and a rose garden. Avenues of sequoias and cedars were planted along with other specimen trees.

In 1891 Lady Emily Smyth held an interview where she outlined further details of these alterations made by Sir Greville. She also gave a few details of some interesting secret rooms and passages in the medieval part of the building on the western side which she referred to as "Drax's Kennel" and "The Fox's Hole". Sir Greville Smyth died in 1901 and Lady Emily Smyth died in 1914.

During the First World War the estate was used as a military hospital, and in the Second World War was requisitioned by the War Office and used in turn as a transit camp, RAF HQ and US Army Command HQ. The estate was the venue for the 1936 Royal Show. One of the exhibition buildings, despite its temporary nature, was an innovative piece of modernist architecture still remembered as the Gane Pavilion. It was designed by Bauhaus architect Marcel Breuer as a show house for the Bristol furniture manufacturer Crofton Gane. For most of the 20th century Ashton Court was the venue for the North Somerset Show, however this is now held in Wraxall.

The last residents of the house were Gilbert and Esme Smyth. Inheriting in 1914, they lived at the court for the next thirty years. Gilbert died in 1940 and Esme in 1946 and the house was left to their daughter Esme Francis Cavendish. She and her husband tried to sell the house immediately in 1946 to help pay death duties. However the Cavendish family did not succeed until thirteen years later in 1959 during which time the house was unoccupied and started to decay. It was then sold to Bristol City Council who still owns it today.

== Recent history ==
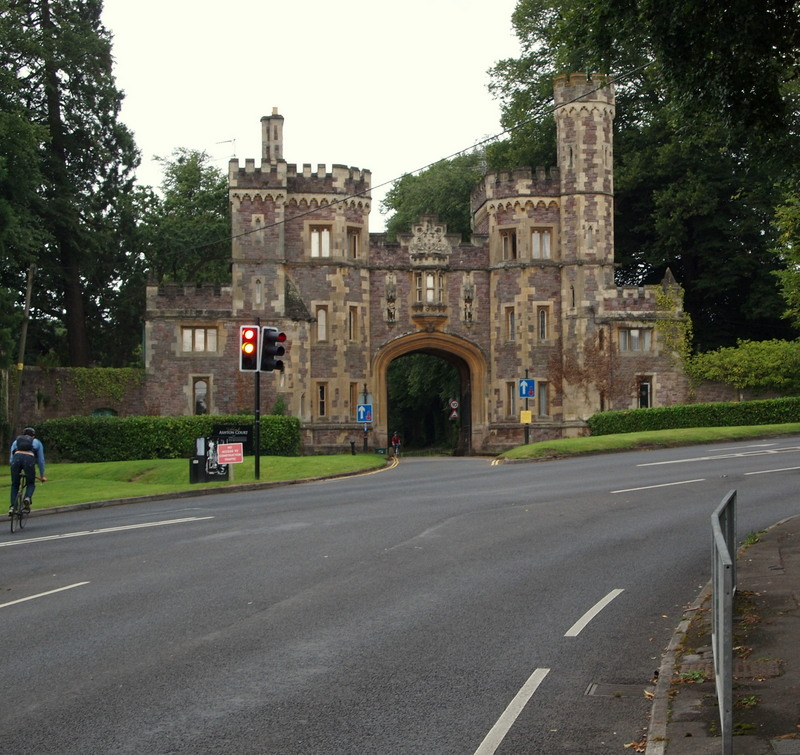
The Clifton Lodge gate at the junction of the A369 and B3129

Since taking ownership, the council has undertaken periodic restorations, but even after extensive investment by both the council and from Heritage Lottery Fund grants, only about a quarter of the building is occupied or usable. The available facilities of the house are rented out for business conferences, parties and weddings. In 2013 a fire damaged the northern wing. It was contained by Avon Fire and Rescue Service, otherwise the rest of the building would have been at risk.

Between 1974 and 2007 the Ashton Court Festival was held in the grounds of the estate. The festival was a weekend event which featured a variety of local bands and national headliners. Mainly aimed at local residents, the festival did not have overnight camping facilities and was financed by donations and benefit gigs. Starting as a small one-day festival in 1974, the festival grew during succeeding years and was said to be Britain's largest free festival until changes brought on by government legislation resulted in compulsory fees and security fencing being introduced. After problems were caused by a temporary move to Hengrove Park in 2001, due to the foot and mouth crisis, and a washout in 2007, the organisers declared bankruptcy in 2007. Other festivals and concerts have since used the grounds, including Love Saves the Day which moved to Ashton Court from Bristol's Eastville Park in 2021. Since 2018, the mansion house has been managed by Bristol charity Artspace Lifespace, allowing the building to be open to the public for a variety of events.

The house was listed on the Heritage at Risk Register in 2013, described as being in "very bad condition and experiencing slow decay". As of 2025, the mansion was described as "two thirds derelict" with an estimated repair bill of £20 million. A local campaign group, Save Ashton Court Mansion, was set up to raise funds to improve its condition. In March 2025 Historic England convened a meeting of politicians including local MP Sadik Al-Hassan, council officers and heritage experts at the mansion to discuss its future.

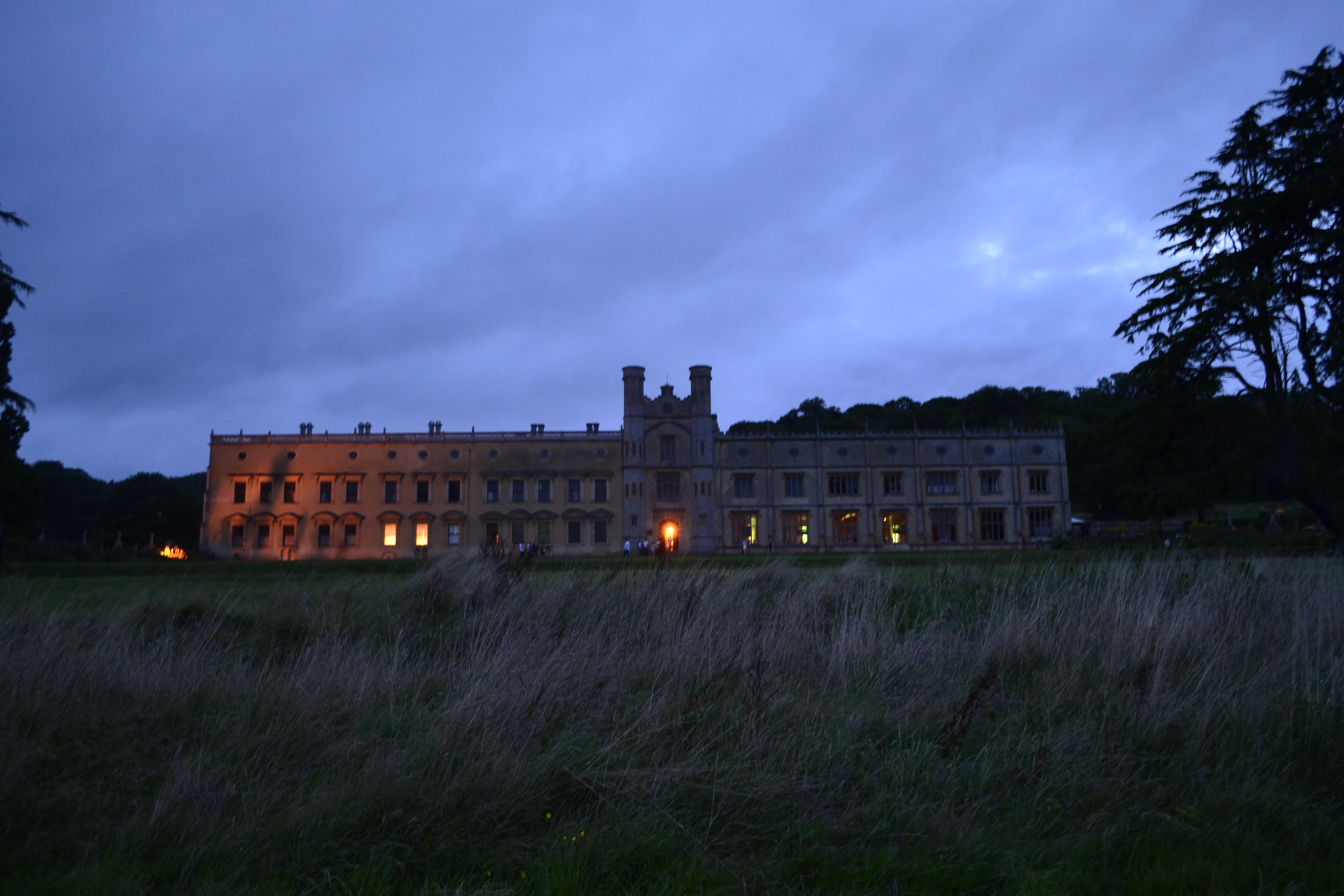
Ashton Court at dusk during a corporate event

== Archives ==
Archives of the Ashton Court estate (including estate management and estate office papers) and personal papers of the Smyth family are held by Bristol Archives (Ref. AC) (online catalogue). Bristol Archives also holds photos and papers about the redevelopment of Ashton Court mansion and stables (Ref. 43326) (online catalogue) and (Ref. 45390) (online catalogue). Other records relating to the Ashton Court estate are also held by Wiltshire and Swindon History Centre and the University of Bristol Special Collections.

== Architecture ==
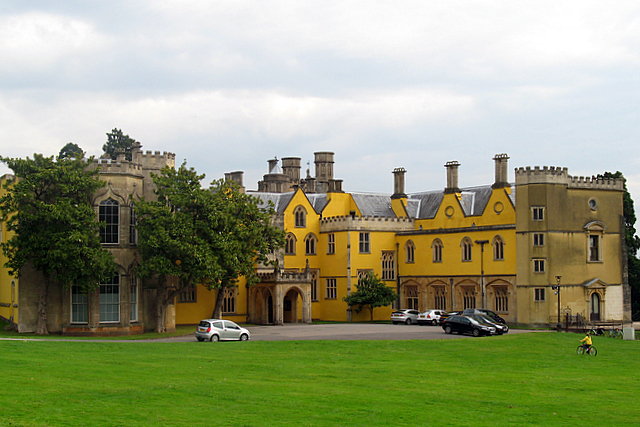
Ashton Court displays a profusion of architectural styles. Here various wings and juxtapositions display Strawberry Hill Gothic to the left, Italian Renaissance windows to the right, a Victorian Porte cochere in the centre, simple Tudor mullion and Gothic tracery windows, plus pseudo-medieval battlements and chaste English Renaissance gables.

Due to successive re-modelling and enlargements the architecture at Ashton Court is complex and seldom what it seems. The core of the house, a 15th-century manor, has been obliterated by later wings, which have in turn been remodelled and altered, most substantially around 1635. Therefore, the plan of the house has evolved as irregular with many juxtapositions and little cohesion; while the majority of the house was built in the 17th century, a time of classical architecture, remodelling and alteration to the fenestration has created an overall Gothic appearance.

In the early 19th century, the house was given a 300 feet (91 m) long façade in an attempt to provide some uniformity and some classical grandeur. However even here, the architecture does not remain faithful to a single style. At the centre of this façade is a much altered Tudor gatehouse, probably built in the 16th century as a portal to the 14th-century manor house. In order to create the long façade, the existing stables, to the right of the gatehouse, were converted to domestic use and given seven bays of Gothic mullioned windows. To the left of the gatehouse, the flanking south-west wing is of a different style. This classically designed wing has been attributed to Inigo Jones, but without supporting evidence; as with a similar attribution at Brympton d'Evercy, also in Somerset, it seems to be based solely on the alternating segmental and pointed pediments over the ground floor windows, and ignoring the irregularities in their spacings and placings, which Jones is unlikely to have countenanced.

To give the long façade with its two wings of contrasting architectural styles a uniting, common feature, the third story of oval windows of the left-hand wings, which was then topped with a Jacobean balustrade was repeated above the Gothic right-hand wing; however, inexplicably the attempt at classical unity was broken by the use of castellation instead of a balustrade on the right-hand side. Overall, its length, contrasting styles, high gatehouse and lack of symmetry give the façade a collegiate rather than domestic appearance. The focal point of the façade, the gatehouse, has multi-faceted turrets at its corners, In 1885, the gatehouse was given a Gothic makeover, which included raising its height and adding the fan vaulting to the ceiling of the passage leading, not to a great base court, as such grandiose architectural features would suggest, but to a small glazed inner courtyard (the Winter Garden). The north wing was included in the remodelling work of 1805 and given ogee headed windows in the delicate Strawberry Hill Gothic style, popular at turn of the 19th century; it was a forerunner of the more medieval ecclesiastical Gothic style that was to characterise the architecture of the 19th century, and employed at Ashton Court during the 1885 alterations. The interior also contains important Gothic decorative schemes; Andrew Foyle, writing in his Pevsner City Guide, Bristol, published in 2004, described the dining room in the north-west wing as, "perhaps the most important surviving Gothic interior in Bristol". Foyle also noted the interior's poor state of repair; the dining room was "badly decayed", the Long Gallery "gutted", and his overall impression of the house, "exciting, puzzling, neglected and intensely sad".

The mansion house and stables have been designated by Historic England as a Grade I listed building. The lower lodge to Ashton Court and attached gates, railings and bollards, which were built in 1805 by Henry Wood, are Grade II* listed buildings. The lower lodge was fully refurbished in 2016 with funding from the Heritage Lottery Fund and is now named Ashton Gatehouse. The building is now a heritage site managed by Ashton Park School. The garden and perimeter walls and railings are also listed.

== Location and surroundings ==
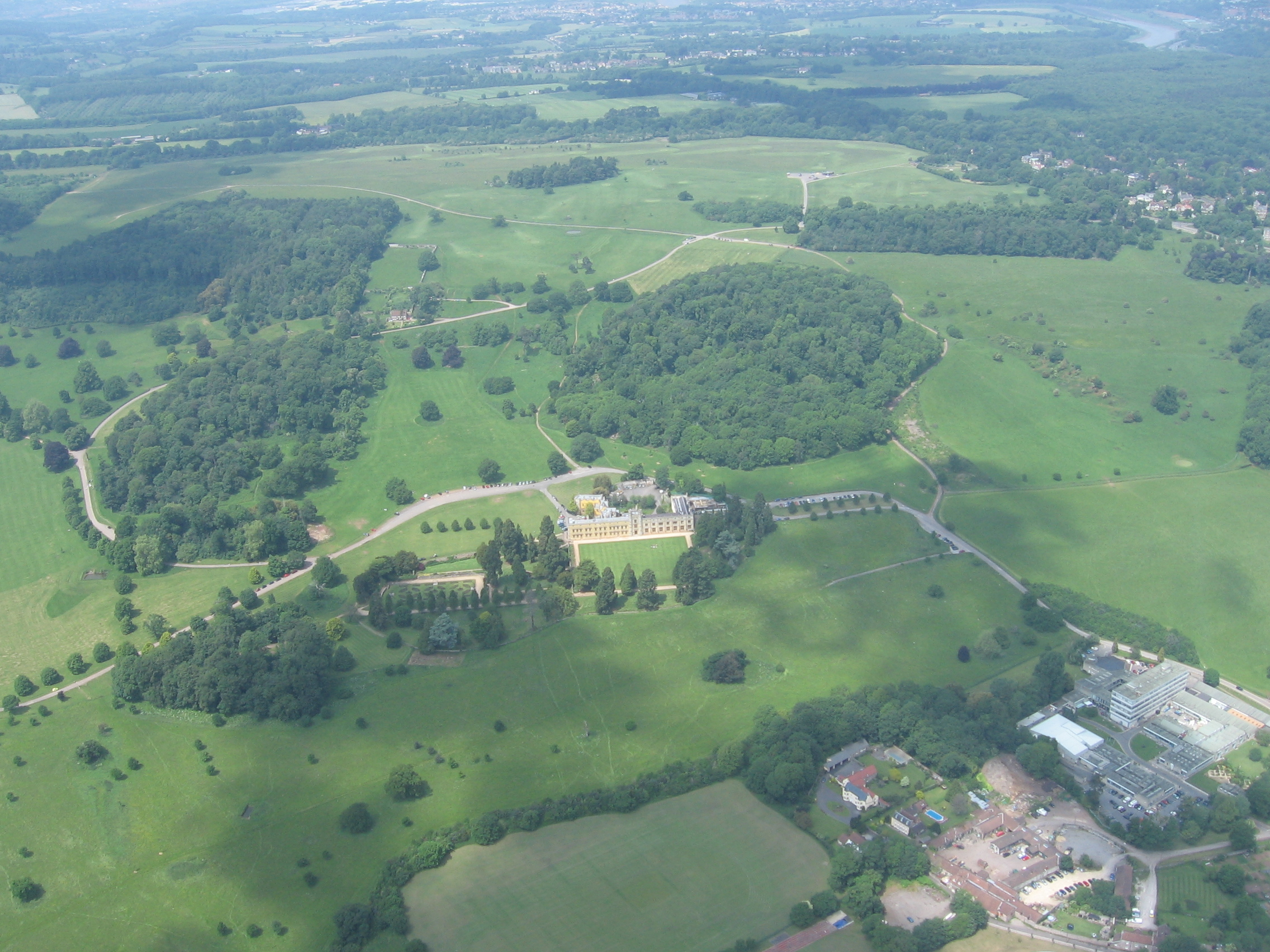
Aerial view of Ashton Court Estate

The house stands within a large estate spanning the boundary between Bristol and North Somerset, approximately 2 kilometres (1.2 mi) from the city centre. It is on the western side of the River Avon close to the Clifton Suspension Bridge and the suburb of Leigh Woods and the Leigh Woods National Nature Reserve which are east of Ashton Court. To the north and west is open countryside. The estate was previously much larger than it is today and included areas which are now suburbs of Bristol including Ashton Gate, Ashton Vale and Southville where the Greville Smyth Park is located. The land for the park was donated by the Smyth family and then landscaped by the city council. It includes two pitch-and-putt golf courses, a disc golf course, an orienteering course and horse riding and mountain bike trails. Bristol's weekly parkrun event (a free, timed 5 km run organised by volunteers) is held at Ashton Court.

The estate covers 850 acres (340 ha) of woods and open grassland laid out by Humphry Repton. Clarken Combe, at the western edge of the estate, is a woodland area with a range of plant species, including narrow-lipped helleborine, which grows here in small numbers under beech. In 2002 a 700-year-old oak tree, called the Domesday Oak, was selected by The Tree Council as one of 50 Great British Trees. In 2011 a crack appeared in the trunk and oak support beams were fitted to support the tree. The supports were only partly successful and a section of the tree collapsed; the remaining part of the tree was pruned to reduce the weight of the surviving section.

There is a deer park which was started in the 14th century and extended in the 16th and 17th centuries. There are still two areas of the estate with deer enclosures. The park contains a great variety of wildlife; much of the site (an area of 210.31 hectares) was notified in 1998 as a Site of Special Scientific Interest due to the presence of rare woodland beetles including: Ctesias serra, Phloiotrya vaudoueri and Eledona agricola. The 2.37 hectares of Ashton Court Meadow is managed as a nature reserve by the Avon Wildlife Trust. It contains a wide range of flowering plants, including wild carrot, yellow-wort and field scabious. Some unusual parasitic plants are also found here, such as common broomrape which feeds off clovers, and yellow rattle, which feeds partly off grass. The gardens and park are listed at Grade II* on the Register of Historic Parks and Gardens of special historic interest in England.

== See also ==
- List of Grade I listed buildings in North Somerset

== Bibliography ==
- Bond, James (1998). Somerset Parks and Gardens. Somerset Books. ISBN 0-86183-465-8.
- Burrough, T.H.B. (1970). Bristol. London: Studio Vista. ISBN 0-289-79804-3.
- Collinson, John (1791). The History and Antiquities of the County of Somerset. Cruttevell.
- Evans, John (1828). The new guide, or, Picture of Bristol, with the beauties of Clifton: a descriptive arrangement of excursions in their vicinities. Bristol.
- Foyle, Andrew (2004). Bristol. Pevsner Architectural Guides. New Haven, US and London: Yale University Press. ISBN 978-0-300-10442-4.
- Gorges, Raymond (1944). The story of a family through eleven centuries, illustrated by portraits and pedigrees, being a history of the family of Gorges. Boston, Priv.
- Green, Ian P.; Myles, Sarah (2000). The Flora of the Bristol Region. Pisces Publications. ISBN 1-874357-18-8.
- Foyle, Andrew; Pevsner, Nikolaus (2011). Somerset: North and Bristol. Pevsner Buildings of England. New Haven, US and London: Yale University Press. ISBN 978-0-300-12658-7.
