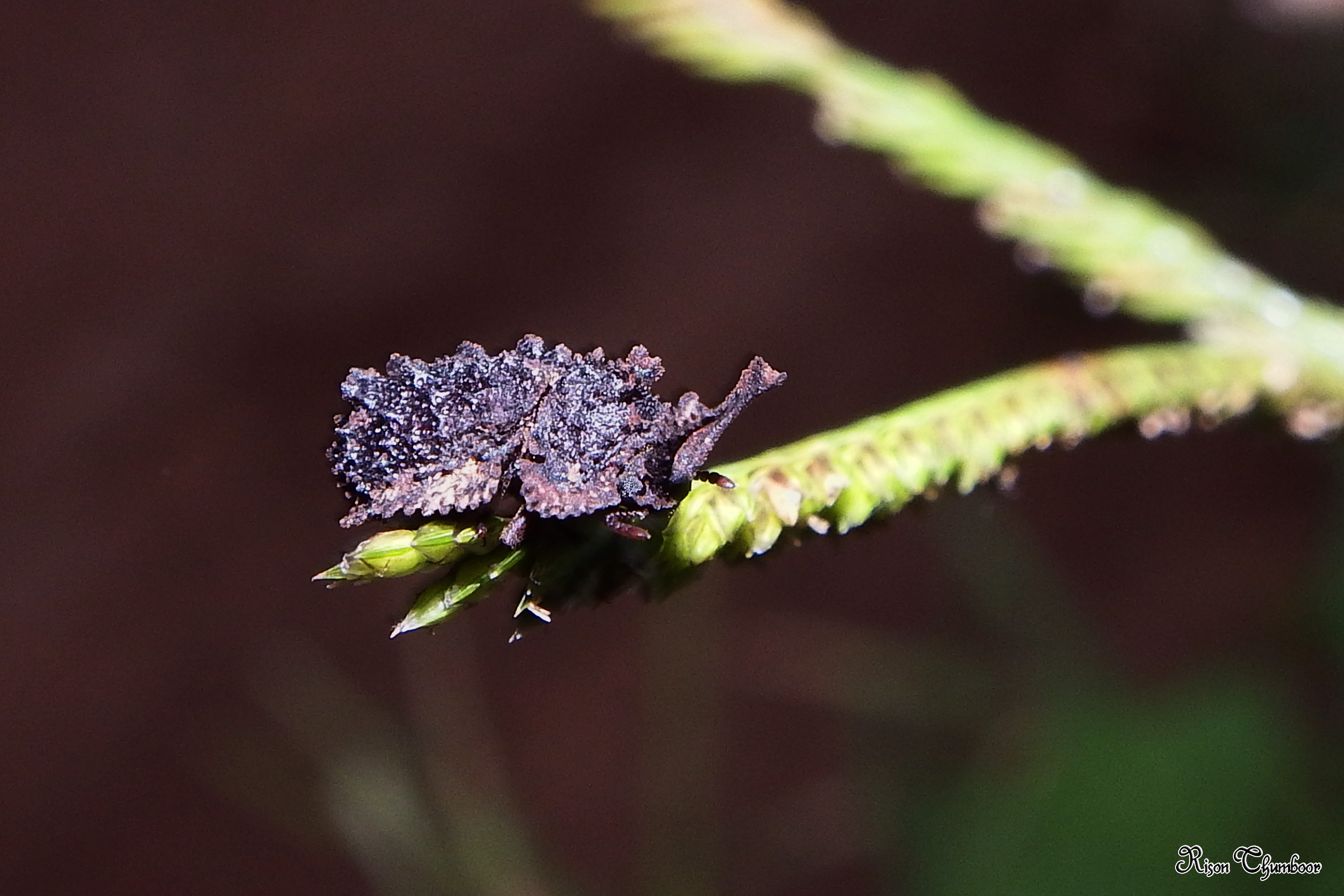
- Byrsax sp. (male)

Scientific classification
- Kingdom: Animalia
- Phylum: Arthropoda
- Class: Insecta
- Order: Coleoptera
- Suborder: Polyphaga
- Infraorder: Cucujiformia
- Family: Tenebrionidae
- Subfamily: Tenebrioninae
- Tribe: Bolitophagini
- Genus: Byrsax; Pascoe, 1860

= Byrsax =

Genus of beetles

Byrsax is a genus of beetles belonging to the family Tenebrionidae, and the tribe Bolitophagini.

The genus was first described in 1860 by Francis Polkinghorne Pascoe. and the type species is Byrsax coenosus.

Species of this genus are found in Australia, Indo-Malaya and the palearctic.

== Species ==
Species listed by GBIF are:

- Byrsax shibatai Masumoto, 1982
- Byrsax nishinoi Akita & Masumoto, 2012
- Byrsax niponicus
- Byrsax hiranoi Akita & Masumoto, 2012
- Byrsax lewisi Akita & Masumoto, 2012
- Byrsax takakuwai Akita & Masumoto, 2012
- Byrsax spiniceps Lewis, 1894
- Byrsax coenosus Pascoe, 1860
- Byrsax kawadai Masumoto, 1982
- Byrsax chientainus Masumoto, Akita & Huang, 2021

Species listed by AFD are:

- Byrsax egenus Pascoe, 1866
- Byrsax coxi Carter, 1914
- Byrsax macleayi Pascoe, 1866
- Byrsax pinnaticollis Carter, 1914

The Korean National Taxa list also lists as a distinct species:

- Byrsax kimurai Miyatake, 1970
