= Byrsax macleayi =

Scientific classification
- Kingdom: Animalia
- Phylum: Arthropoda
- Clade: Pancrustacea
- Class: Insecta
- Order: Coleoptera
- Suborder: Polyphaga
- Infraorder: Cucujiformia
- Family: Tenebrionidae
- Subfamily: Tenebrioninae
- Tribe: Bolitophagini
- Genus: Byrsax
- Species: B. macleayi

Binomial name
- Byrsax macleayi Pascoe, 1866

Species of beetle

Byrsax macleayi is a species of darkling beetle in the subfamily Tenebrioninae, and the tribe Bolitophagini.

It was first described in 1866 by Francis Polkinghorne Pascoe. The species epithet, macleayi, honours Alexander Macleay who had sent him the specimens.
