= Eastville Park =

Park in Bristol, England

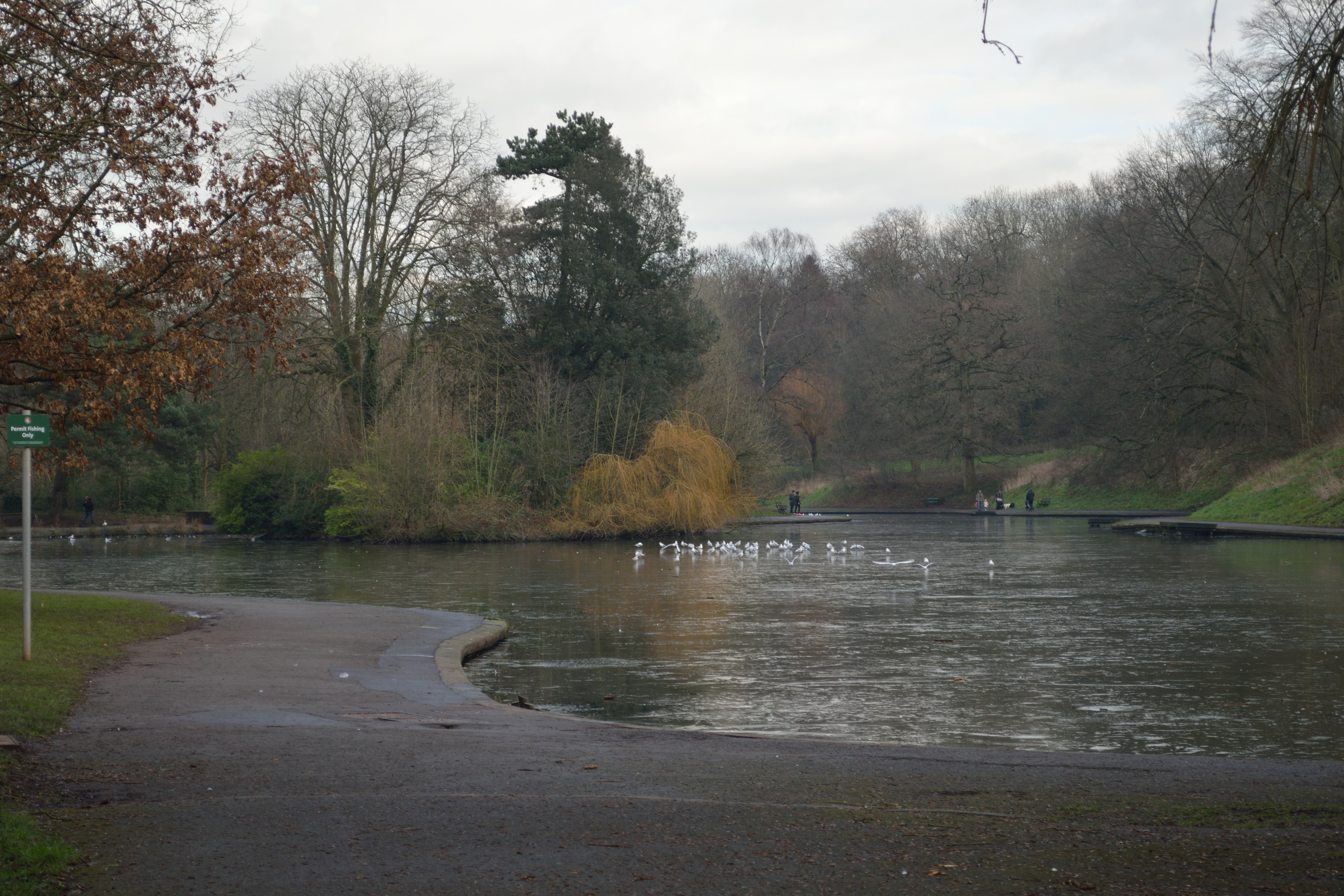
- Interactive map of Eastville Park
- Type: Urban park
- Location: Bristol, England
- Coordinates: 51.4757°N 2.5585°W
- Area: 70 acres (28 ha)
- Operator: Bristol City Council
- Open: All year
- Website: Official website

Eastville Park is an urban park in Eastville, Bristol, England. The grounds that became the park were purchased from Greville Smyth of Ashton Court and the boundary walls are listed with Historic England. The facilities include a lake and tennis courts.

== History ==
The park is on the estate grounds of two former houses, Heath House and Ridgway House, that were purchased by the council from Sir Greville Smyth of Ashton Court for £30,000 in 1889 (equivalent to £3.33 million in 2025). Between the years of 1889 and 1894 hedges were removed, footpaths laid and seats added on the existing agricultural land. The trees already on the land including limes and horse chestnuts were kept.

== Landmarks ==
The boundary wall is made of the local pennant rubble with cast-iron spear head railings and is grade II listed with Historic England.

== Facilities ==
There is a lake with a serpentine shape which is bordered by lawns and old beech trees. There are two children's playgrounds, football pitches, tennis courts, a basketball court, a one-mile running circuit and a bowling green. The River Frome borders the Northern edge of the park. The boathouse to the lake was burned down in 1913 and again 1923. There is a disused Victorian lido which was hit by a bomb in World War II that has been used as a theatre. Eastville parkrun takes place at the park every Saturday morning, with the junior parkrun taking place every Sunday. The park has an area of 70 acres.
