= Ashton Court Festival =

Annual outdoor music festival in Bristol, England from 1974 to 2007

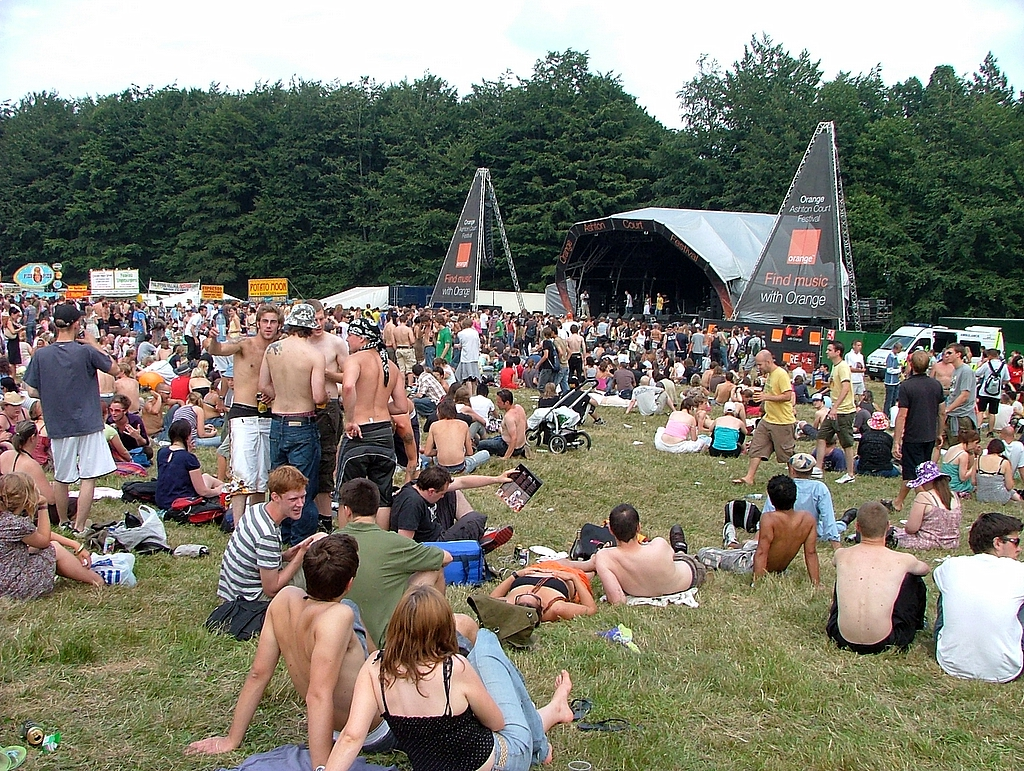
- 2006 Ashton Court Festival main stage The main stage at Ashton Court Festival, pictured in 2006.
- Genre: music, dance, theatre, crafts
- Dates: 14 and 15 July
- Locations: Ashton Court, Bristol, England
- Years active: 1974–2007
- Website: www.ashtoncourtfestival.com/ (archived)

The Ashton Court Festival was an outdoor music festival held annually in mid-July on the grounds of Ashton Court, just outside Bristol, England. The festival was a weekend event which featured a variety of local bands and national headliners. Mainly aimed at local residents, the festival did not have overnight camping facilities and was financed by donations and benefit gigs.

Starting as a small one-day festival in 1974, the festival grew during succeeding years and was said to be Britain's largest free festival until changes brought on by government legislation resulted in compulsory fees and security fencing being introduced. After problems were caused by a temporary move to Hengrove Park in 2001, due to the foot and mouth crisis, and a washout in 2007, the organisers declared bankruptcy in 2007.

== History ==
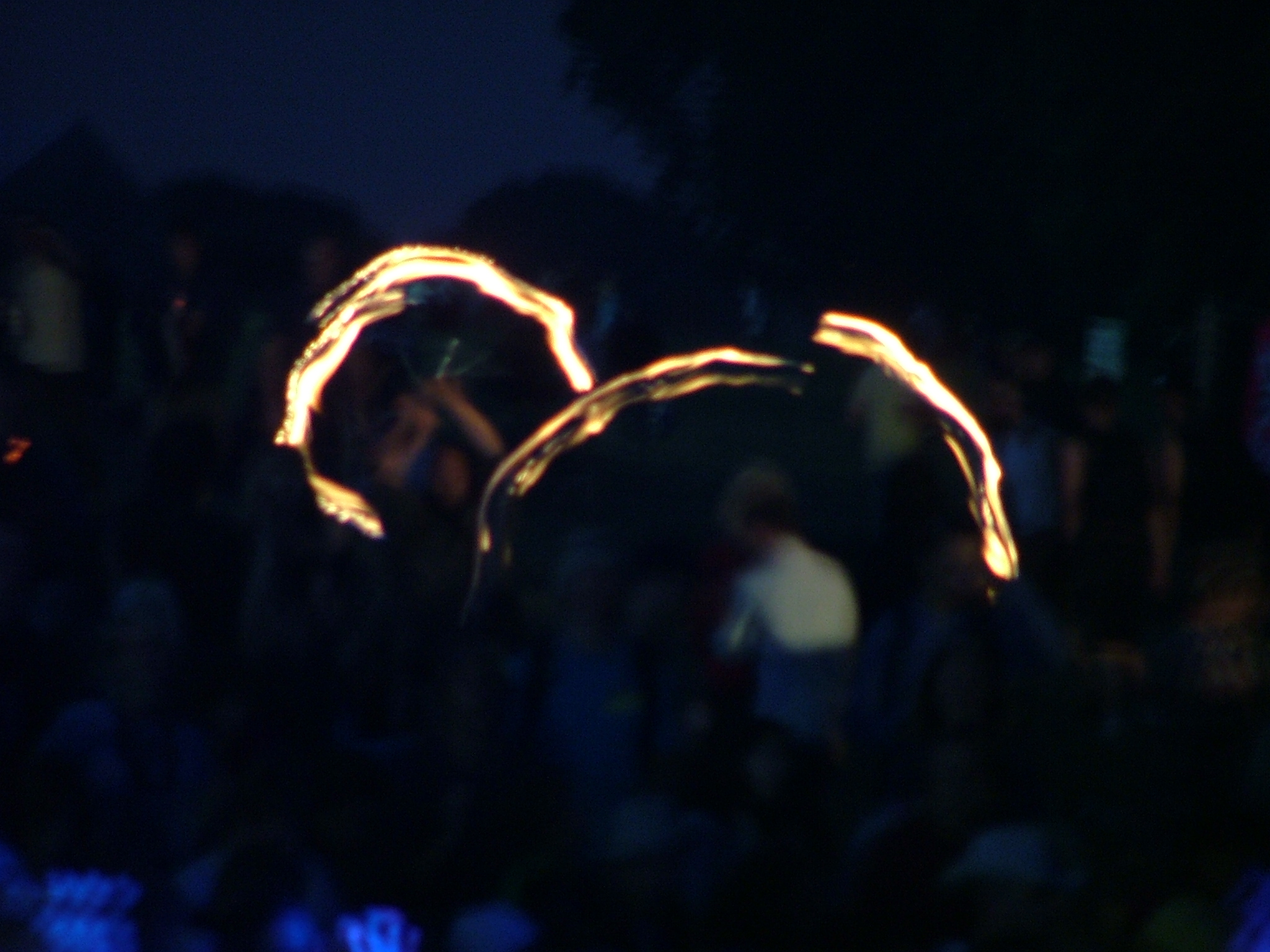
Firetwirling was a popular amateur event at Ashton Court Festival. Image from 2005 festival.

=== Origins ===
The first festival was held in 1974, organised by Royce Creasey and friends, as a small event, for the local musicians to entertain the local community. The first festival took place over four successive weekends with bands playing from a stage improvised from a flat bed truck. Bristol City Council donated £50. The following year the festival took place over one weekend and was located near to Ashton Court mansion. After this, new organisers came on board and fund-raising gigs were held enabling the event to grow steadily through the 1970s.

=== 1980 ===
In 1980, large numbers of people from far afield attended, trees were damaged and burnt and there was illegal camping and lurid press reports of drugs and nudity. It was not until 1983 that the festival recommenced. when it was a one-day event; in 1984 a de facto two-day event was created by staging it back-to-back with a one-day WOMAD event. The festival took place in a large sloped clearing surrounded on three sides by New Barn Wood and Clarken Coombe. The main stage was placed at the bottom of the slope and the second stage in a natural amphitheatre near the entrance to the clearing. There were many other performance spaces, varying from year to year, including a dance tent, marquees for world music, acoustic acts and performing arts, and the "Blackout" tent for experimental music and video, as well as a children's area and funfair rides. Camping on the festival site was not allowed.

=== 21st century ===
In 2001 the Bristol Community Festival temporarily relocated to Hengrove Park in the south of the city. Ashton Court Estate, which includes a deer park, was closed as a quarantine measure due to the outbreak of foot and mouth disease that affected the United Kingdom that year. The move caused a massive drop in attendance and a heavy financial loss, leading to debts which hung over the organisation. This, along with changes to licensing laws and tightening health and safety requirements, led to a more commercial style of organisation, with a compulsory entrance fee and a strict security presence around the perimeter fence. This attracted criticism from some locals who felt that the "community" nature of the festival had been lost. Even so, the festival continued to be run by volunteers on a not-for-profit basis.

In 2003 the weight and vibrations of crowds returning from the Ashton Court Festival and the Bristol International Balloon Fiesta put such a great strain on the Clifton Suspension Bridge that the Bridge Trustees decided to close the bridge to all traffic, including pedestrians, for the entirety of the festival and most of the Balloon Fiesta in 2004 and 2005.

=== Crisis ===
In December 2006 it was announced that the festival was in financial crisis and there was uncertainty over whether the 2007 event would take place. The festival planning went ahead with support and donations from a number of Bristol businesses. In June 2007 it was announced that alcohol would not be allowed to be taken on site, but would be available to purchase from official bars within the arena. Also, that everyone attending the festival would be searched on the way in. This announcement caused much controversy.

Although locals have long referred to the festival as the "Ashton Court Festival", before 2004 it was officially called the Bristol Community Festival. Since then it became increasingly popular, and for several years it was claimed to be Britain's biggest free festival; however, the "suggested minimum donation" for entry become a gradually increasing compulsory entry fee. From 2007, children (aged 10–16) also had to pay an entry fee, while under 10s remained free (previously all children got in free), and a new discounted weekend ticket became available. The festival was typically attended by over 60,000 people annually.

In the festival's last year, 2007, the site was moved to Smythe's field in front of Ashton Court Mansion. On the second day, the event was cancelled due to torrential rain, which made the site inaccessible to emergency vehicles. "The health and safety of our audience is what is important," said organiser Steve Hunt. Over 80 bands were due to perform that day, including Damon Albarn's The Good, the Bad & the Queen. The cancellation increased the pressure on the already strained finances of the festival. On Friday 20 July 2007 Bristol Community Festival Ltd, the not-for-profit company which organised the event, announced that it had started the process of winding up the company due to unsustainable financial losses.

== Notable performers ==
The festival's music policy always focused on local acts, but since the late 1990s there was a move towards attracting national acts to headline the festival. Major acts at Ashton Court in recent years include:

- Steve Hillage in 1978
- The Only Ones in 1978
- Portishead in 1998.
- Feeder and Rae & Christian in 1999.
- Mad Professor, Kosheen and Stereo MC's in 2001.
- Reef and Kosheen and Dirty Drugs in 2002.
- Robert Plant, McKay and The Electric Soft Parade in 2003.
- The Stranglers, Goldie Lookin' Chain and Glenn Tilbrook in 2004.
- Super Furry Animals, Lemon Jelly, Roni Size and Steve Harley & Cockney Rebel in 2005.
- Simple Minds, The Go! Team, Plan B in 2006.
- The Good, the Bad & the Queen, The Fall, Gravenhurst in 2007.

== Legacy ==
Following the end of Bristol Community Festival, other groups emerged hoping to continue with some sort of summer festival in Bristol. Bristol Music Festival became the Bristol Festival (now BrisFest) and has so far successfully put on four summer festivals, albeit in the city centre. 2011 saw the most successful even yet, with over 25,000 people attending over three days.

BrisFest returned to Ashton Court in 2012 and 2013, however announced in December 2013 that they would not be continuing the festival into 2014.

The event returned in 2015 and 2016 as part of the "Let's Rock Bristol" retro festival.

== See also ==
- List of music festivals in the United Kingdom
- List of historic rock festivals
