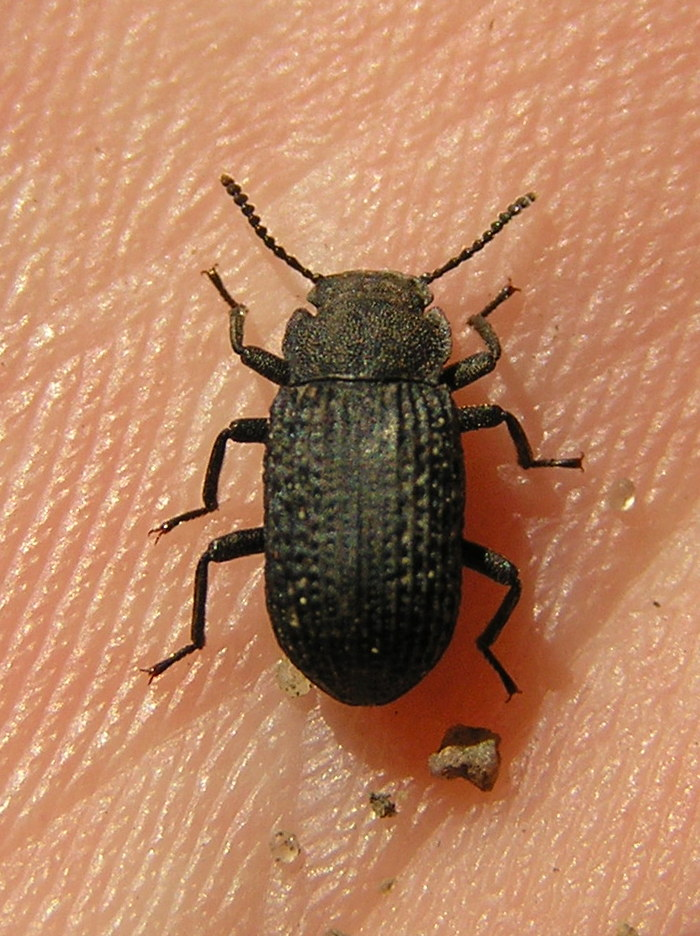
- Bolitophagus reticulatus

Scientific classification
- Kingdom: Animalia
- Phylum: Arthropoda
- Class: Insecta
- Order: Coleoptera
- Suborder: Polyphaga
- Infraorder: Cucujiformia
- Family: Tenebrionidae
- Subfamily: Tenebrioninae
- Tribe: Bolitophagini
- Genus: Bolitophagus; Illiger, 1798

= Bolitophagus =

Genus of beetles

Bolitophagus is a genus of beetles belonging to the family Tenebrionidae.

The genus was first described by Johann Karl Wilhelm Illiger in 1798.

The species of this genus are found in Eurasia and Northern America.

Species:

- Bolitophagus reticulatus (Linnaeus, 1767)
