= Bristol International Balloon Fiesta =

Annual balloon festival in Bristol, England

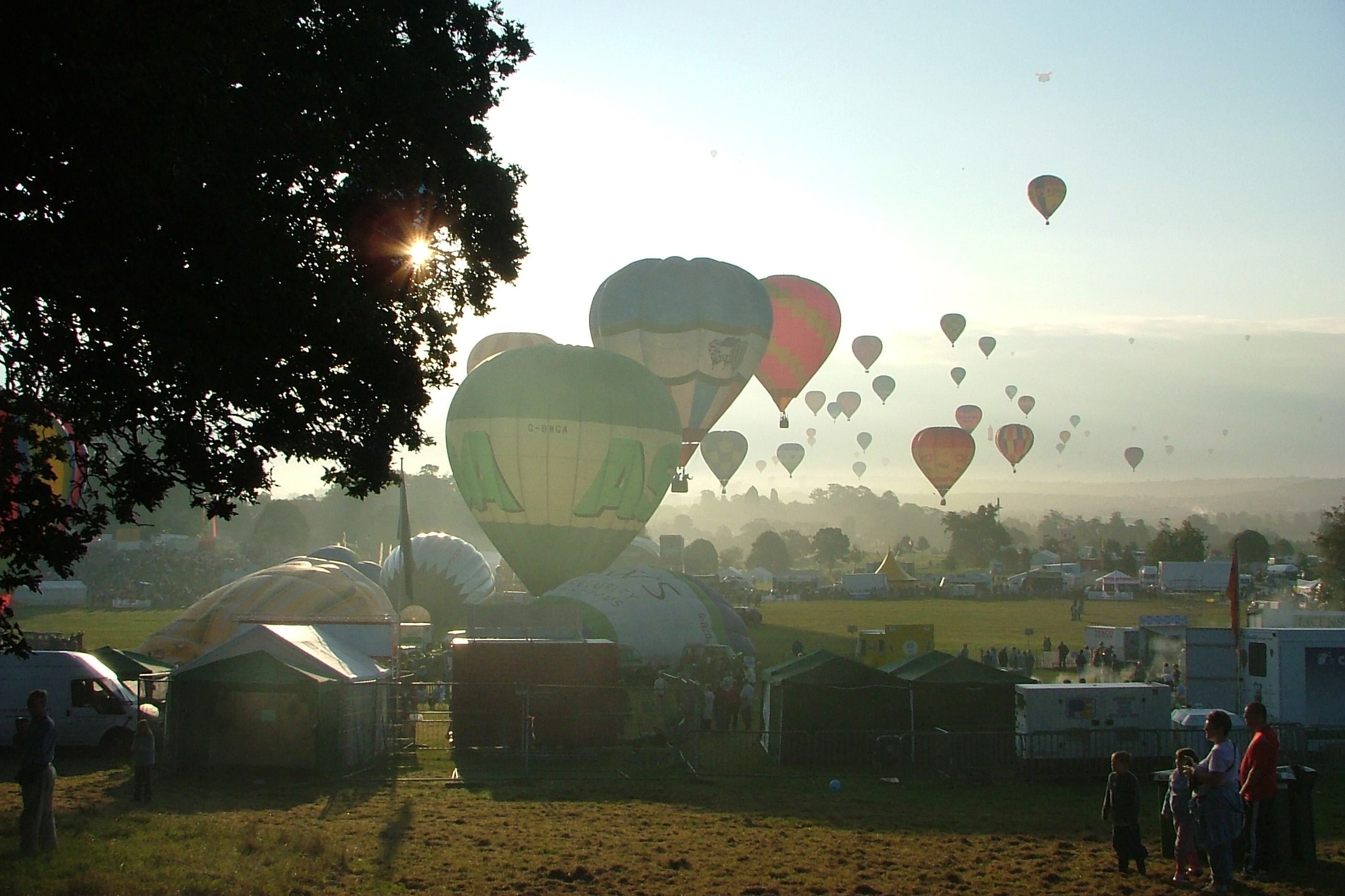
- A 6am mass ascent
- Genre: Hot air balloon festival
- Dates: August
- Locations: Ashton Court, Bristol
- Coordinates: 51.4437°N 2.64157°W
- Country: United Kingdom
- Years active: 1979–2019, 2022–
- Founder: Don Cameron
- Website: bristolballoonfiesta.co.uk

The Bristol International Balloon Fiesta is an annual four day free festival of hot air ballooning in Bristol, England. Teams from the UK and other parts of the world bring their hot air balloons to the site and participate in mass ascents where as many as 100 balloons may launch at a time.

The festival is one of the largest in Europe. It is common to have crowds of over 100,000 on each of the four days of the festival. Most of the events take place at Ashton Court, including mass launches which are made twice a day, at 6am and 6pm, subject to weather conditions.

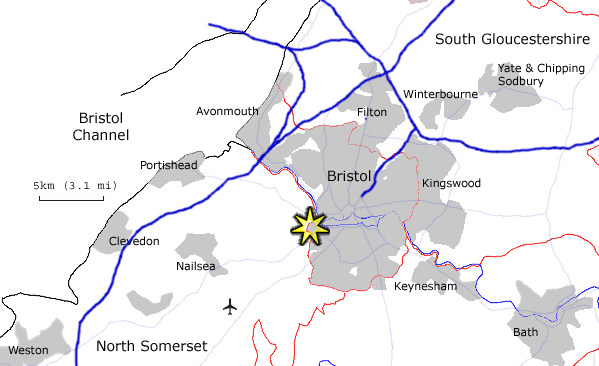
Location of Ashton Court, where Fiesta takes place

== History ==
The event was first held in 1979, building on a strong local tradition of ballooning in and around Bristol, stretching back to the eighteenth century.

In the past, the fiesta used to be held in the second week of September, but due to cancellations of flights and the muddy ground because of bad weather, it has been moved in the start of August. This has had a great effect as more flights manage to fly; cancellations are now normally due to high winds.

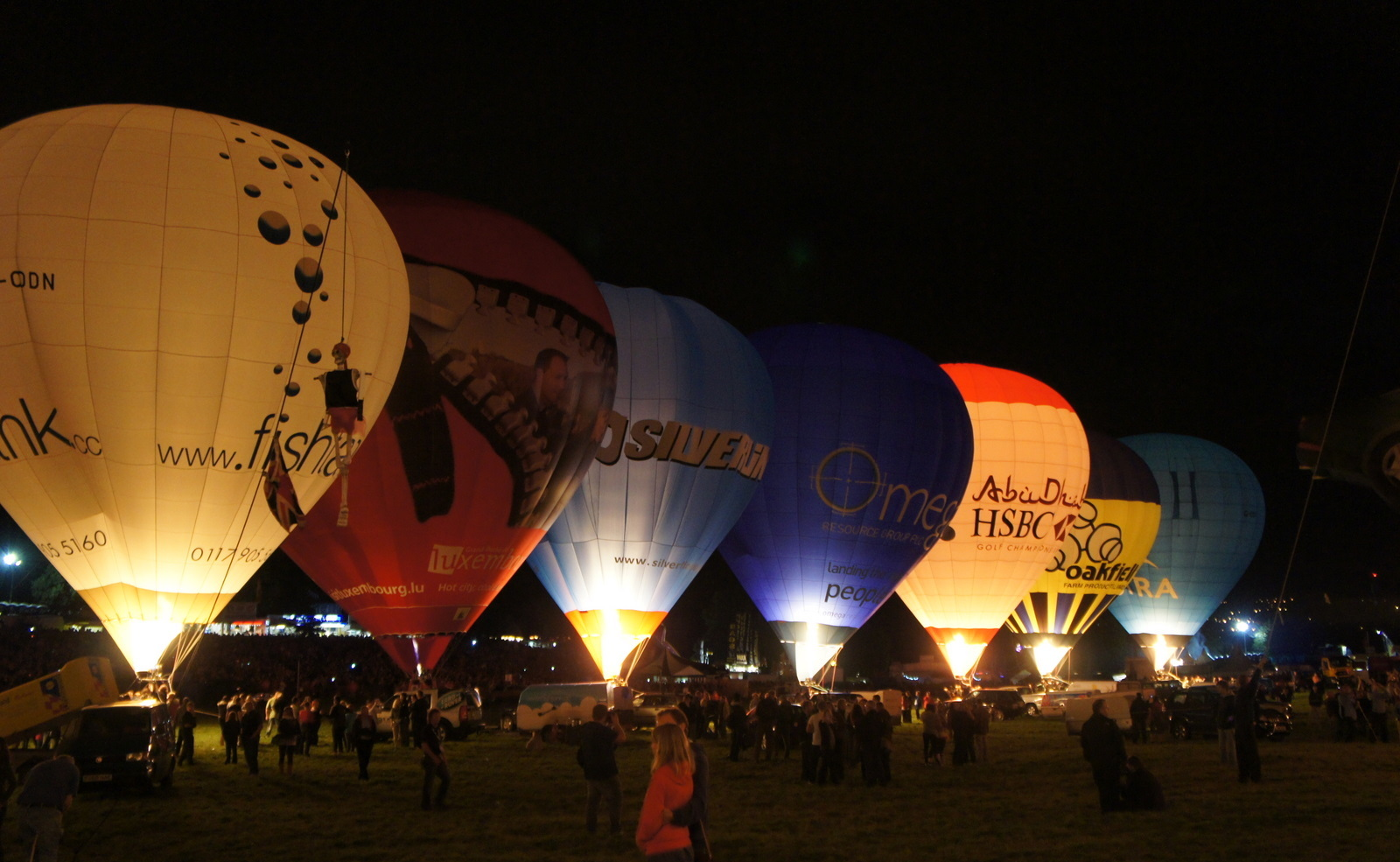
The nightglow is one of the most popular parts of the fiesta.

In 2003, the weight of crowds returning from the Balloon Fiesta and Ashton Court festival put such a great strain on the Clifton Suspension Bridge that it was decided to close the bridge to all traffic, including pedestrians, during these events from 2004 onwards.

On 10 August 2013, they broke a balloon fiesta record after 74 balloons landed in one field near the former Somerdale Factory in Keynsham. The record was then broken a year later, when 90 balloons again landed in the former Cadbury's chocolate factory on 9 August.

The Balloon Fiesta was cancelled during the COVID-19 pandemic in 2020 and 2021, to avoid gathering crowds at Ashton Court. However, there were mass ascent events for people to watch from a distance, with a one-off "Fiesta Flypast" in 2020, and a "Fiesta Fortnight" of ascents in 2021.

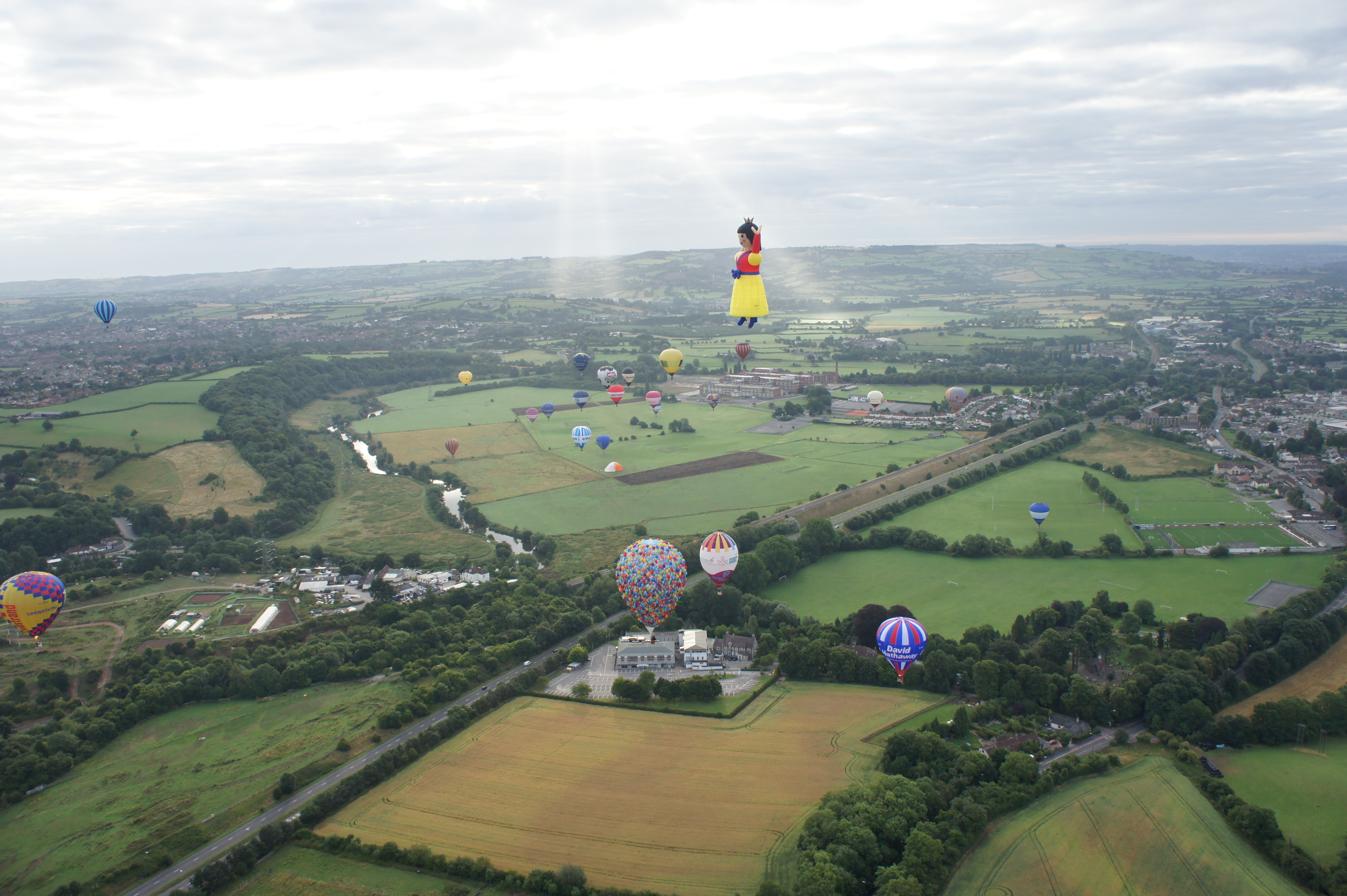
The mass-landing in 2013 at the former Cadbury's factory.

== Attractions ==
One popular attraction is the night glow, when balloons are inflated and glow to music after dark. These are held on the opening Thursday night at approximately 9:30pm, followed by a fireworks display. There is another night glow at the same time followed by the fireworks on the Saturday night. Some people see these as the highlight of the fiesta.

The balloon makers Cameron Balloons are near to the fiesta site, in Bedminster, and make many of the special shaped balloons, which have included Rupert Bear, The Scottish Piper, Bertie Bassett, the Tesco Trolley, Stuart the Minion, and the BBC One Balloon. Many shapes have also attended the fiesta from abroad, over the years a UFO and a beaver have travelled from the US, a kiwi bird from New Zealand, and an upside down balloon from the Netherlands.

In recent years, the event has diversified to include small scale air displays, attracting the likes of The Blades, Typhoon display team and the Red Arrows.

== See also ==
- List of hot air balloon festivals
- Northampton Balloon Festival
- Lord Mayor's Hot Air Balloon Regatta
