= North Somerset Show =

Agricultural show in the UK

Coordinates: 51.4278°N 2.7053°W

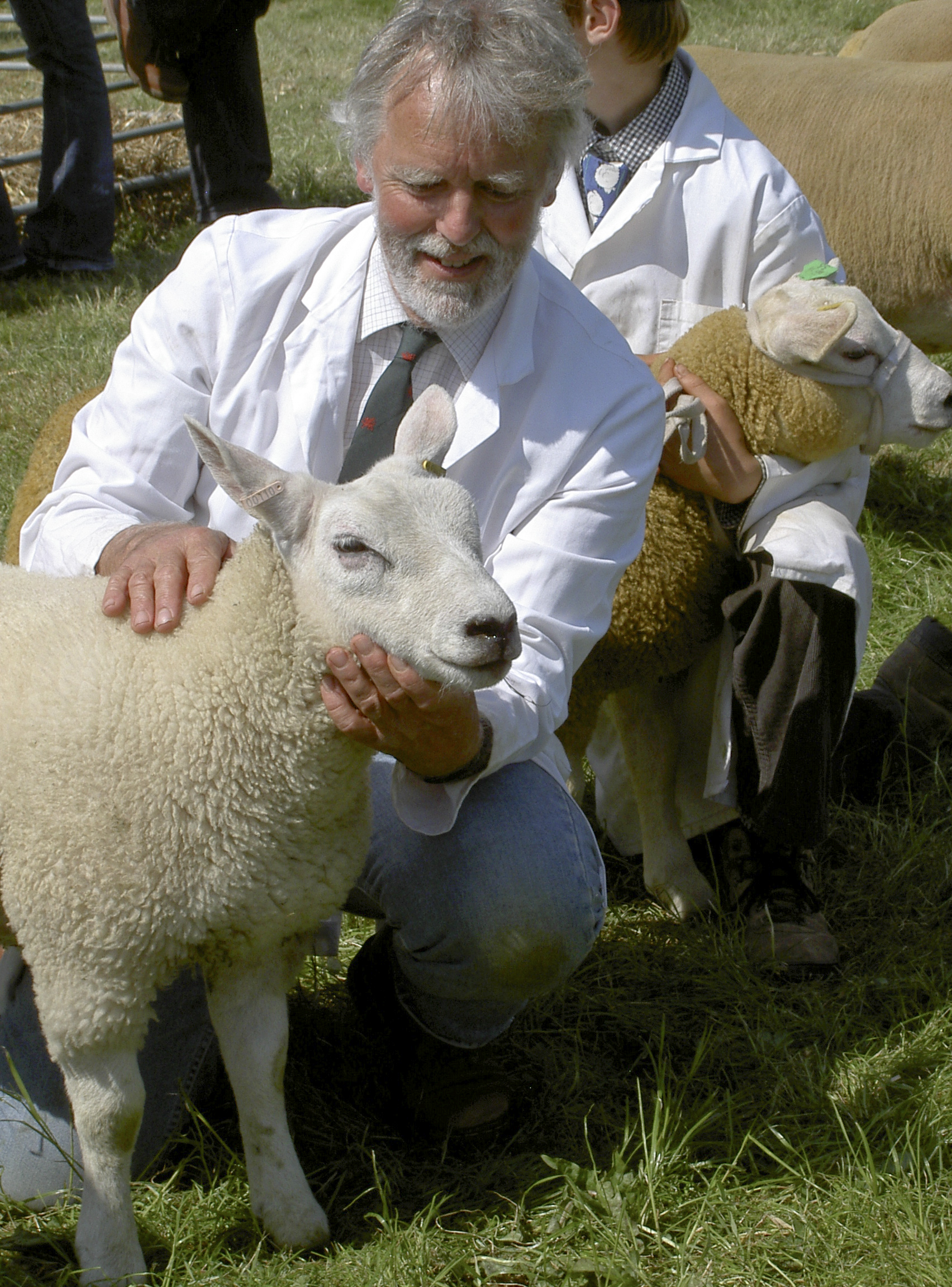
Sheep at the 2011 show

The North Somerset Show is an agricultural show held annually in May at Wraxall, North Somerset, England. It is organised by the North Somerset Agricultural Society. The show takes place at permanent showgrounds in Wraxall. The event normally attracts around 20,000 people.

== History ==
The society was formed out of the North Somerset Ploughing Society in 1840 by a group of farmers. The sole purpose was to promote and showcase agricultural development to both those involved in farming and agriculture as well as to promote an agricultural awareness to the general public. The event used to be held at Ashton Court in Bristol until the society purchased its current 130-acre site, which was previously part of the Tyntesfield Estate, in 2002. Many other events are also held at this site throughout the year such as a Ploughing Match and Craft and Produce Show.

== The show today ==
Many of the basic traditions can still be found in today's show with the emphasis still being very much on agriculture. The showing of livestock, horses and demonstrations of local and rural skills and crafts still play an important part of the show. In 2024 the ploughing match had to be cancelled due to bad weather.

The 2019 event was the 160th show. The show was not held in 2020 or 2021 due to the coronavirus pandemic.

After an absence of three years the 162nd show was held on 2022. The 2023 show was held on Bank Holiday Monday, 1 May 2023, and opened early in a bid to avoid traffic problems that caused gridlock the previous year. The event normally attracts around 20,000 people.
