= Lord Mayor's Hot Air Balloon Regatta =

Fundraising event in London

- Genre: Hot air balloon festival
- Locations: London, England
- Coordinates: 51.4779°N 0.1602°W
- Country: United Kingdom
- Inaugurated: 2015
- Website: www.balloonregatta.com/the-regatta

The Lord Mayor's Hot Air Balloon Regatta is an annual fundraising event of hot air ballooning in London, England. Involving the mass ascent of balloons It is held in aid of the Lord Mayor's Appeal.

== History ==
The event was set up in 2015 as an annual event. It was first held that year in Shoreditch Park then in Burgess Park for 2016. In 2017, the launch site was London City Airport to mark the 30th anniversary of its opening. It was cancelled in 2018 after several postponements due to poor ground conditions. 2019 saw the most recent successful launch from Battersea Park.

Since 2020, the event has been troubled with persistent delays and cancellations, first in 2020 and 2021 due to the COVID-19 pandemic and from 2022 to 2025 due to unfavourable weather conditions.

== See also ==
- Bristol International Balloon Fiesta
- Northampton Balloon Festival
