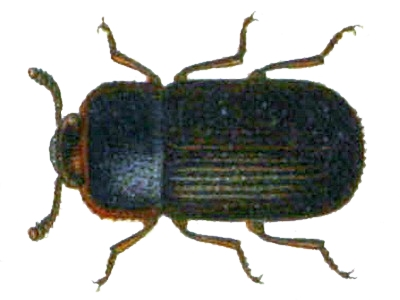

Scientific classification
- Kingdom: Animalia
- Phylum: Arthropoda
- Class: Insecta
- Order: Coleoptera
- Suborder: Polyphaga
- Infraorder: Cucujiformia
- Family: Tenebrionidae
- Genus: Eledona
- Species: E. agricola

Binomial name
- Eledona agricola (Herbst, 1783)

= Eledona agricola =

Species of beetle

Eledona agricola is a species of beetle belonging to the family Tenebrionidae.

It is native to Europe.
