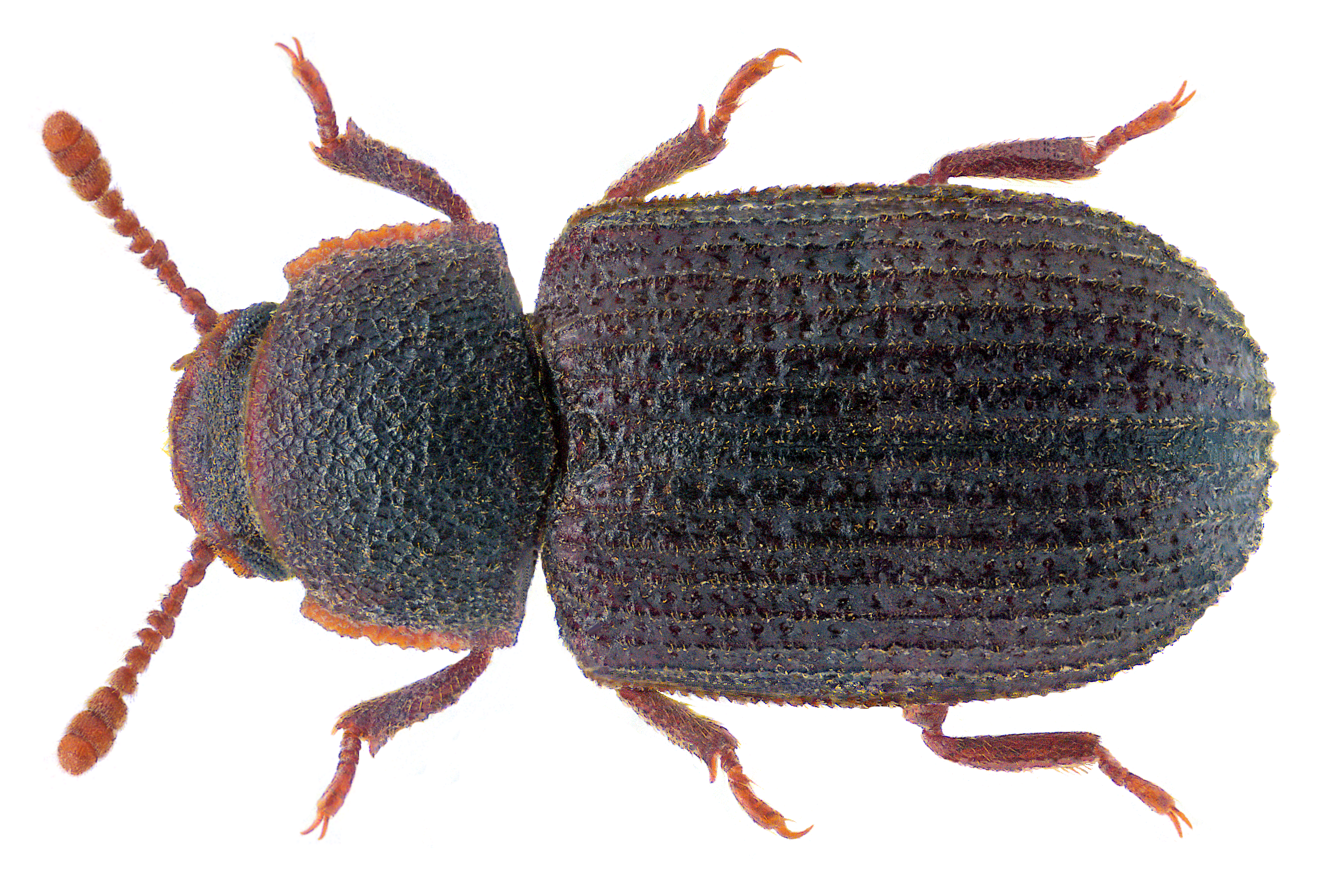
- Eledona agricola (Herbst, 1783)

Scientific classification
- Kingdom: Animalia
- Phylum: Arthropoda
- Class: Insecta
- Order: Coleoptera
- Suborder: Polyphaga
- Infraorder: Cucujiformia
- Family: Tenebrionidae
- Genus: Eledona; Latreille, 1796

= Eledona =

Genus of beetles

Eledona is a genus of beetles belonging to the family Tenebrionidae.

The species of this genus are found in Europe.

Species:

- Eledona agricola (Herbst, 1783)
- Eledona hellenica Reitter, 1885
