= Billing Aquadrome =

Park in Northamptonshire, England

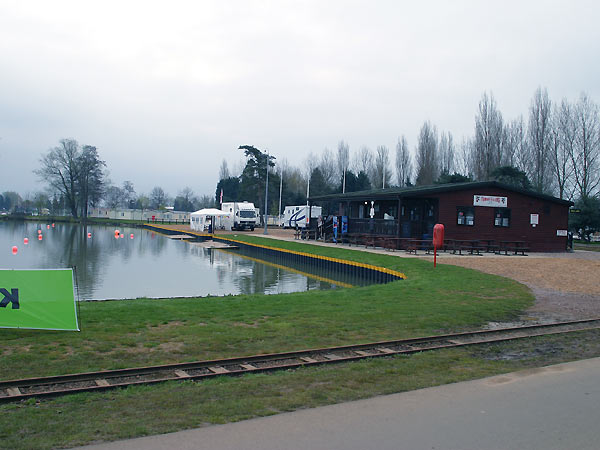
- Interactive map of Billing Aquadrome
- Location: Billing, Northamptonshire, England
- Coordinates: 52°14′42″N 0°48′46″W
- Status: Operating
- Area: 235 acres (0.95 km^{2})

Billing Aquadrome is a 235-acre (0.95 km²) leisure and holiday park in Great Billing, an eastern district of Northampton, England. The park is situated in the River Nene valley and occupies former gravel extraction pits. The park includes caravan holiday homes and lodges, holiday accommodation, touring pitches and leisure facilities.

== History ==
=== Formation and early years (1930s–2000s) ===
Billing Aquadrome developed from gravel extraction workings in the Nene Valley. The Northamptonshire Historic Environment Record dates the site's gravel extraction to the early 20th century and describes the Billing gravel pits as among the earliest and most extensively worked pits in the county. Gravel extraction continued at the site until 1960. The former extraction pits subsequently filled with water and became part of the recreational development of the site.

Billing Aquadrome Limited was incorporated on 10 February 1945. The site was subsequently developed as a leisure and holiday centre. The Northamptonshire Historic Environment Record describes Billing Aquadrome as a recreation centre and holiday centre dating from the mid-20th century.

In April 1949, a miniature railway opened at the site, featuring a model Royal Scot locomotive.

Gravel extraction continued at Billing until 1960. In 1970, a gravel pit was converted into a boating marina with 110 floating berths. The site subsequently developed as a caravan and camping holiday centre based around its lakes and marina. A 1998 Environment Agency report described Billing Aquadrome as a major caravan and camping holiday centre, situated entirely within the natural floodplain of the River Nene, with lakes resulting from gravel abstraction and used for recreational purposes.

=== Flooding, administration and redevelopment (2020–present) ===
Billing Aquadrome is situated within the natural floodplain of the River Nene and has historically been subject to flood warnings and evacuation procedures. In January 2024, flooding associated with Storm Henk led to the evacuation of residents and holidaymakers from the park. The park was evacuated again on 10 February 2024 after the River Nene overtopped its banks. A further evacuation took place in September 2024, when emergency services assisted with the evacuation of residents because of rising floodwater.

Billing Aquadrome Limited entered administration on 6 July 2023.

In March 2024, holiday park operator Meadow Bay Villages acquired Billing Aquadrome out of administration. Meadow Bay Villages subsequently announced a £12 million investment programme at the park, including upgrades to leisure facilities and accommodation.

== Site landmarks and heritage ==
=== Billing Mill ===
Billing Mill, also known as Great Billing Mill or Billing Bridge Mill, is a historic watermill on the River Nene adjacent to Billing Aquadrome. A mill was recorded at the site in the Domesday survey of 1086, and the site subsequently served as a fulling mill and later as a corn mill. The present mill was rebuilt in the early 19th century.

The mill ceased working in 1940 and subsequently became derelict. It was restored in 1968 and opened as a Museum of Milling. Around 1995, the building was converted into a bar and restaurant, with additional buildings subsequently added. The former Billing Mill public house subsequently closed in 2020 and is recorded as permanently closed.

=== Miniature Railway ===
Billing Aquadrome opened a miniature railway in April 1949, featuring a model Royal Scot locomotive.

== Park layout and facilities ==
Billing Aquadrome is a holiday park situated across approximately 235 acres in the Nene Valley and centred around a series of lakes and a marina. The wider Upper Nene Valley Gravel Pits area comprises a chain of active and disused sand and gravel pits, with open water and associated wetland habitats.

The park provides holiday accommodation including caravans, lodges, glamping pods and touring and camping pitches.

=== Estate infrastructure and landscape ===
As part of its redevelopment programme, Meadow Bay Villages announced improvements to the park's leisure facilities and landscape. These included a new lakeside boardwalk, an amphitheatre and open-air cinema, a BMX pump track and a Himalayan adventure golf course.

=== Lakes, marina and water recreation ===
Billing Aquadrome is arranged around 11 natural lakes and includes a marina. Activities offered at the park include fishing, paddleboarding and kayaking. The park's 2024 redevelopment also included an outdoor water facility, described by the operator as Adventure Island, with freshwater swimming, paddleboarding, kayaking and sauna facilities.

=== Leisure and recreation ===
Current facilities at Billing Aquadrome include a heated indoor swimming pool, an outdoor splash park, fishing lakes, water sports facilities, an amphitheatre and other entertainment facilities. The park also includes children's activities and entertainment, together with food and drink facilities.

== Hosted rallies and event heritage ==
Billing Aquadrome has historically hosted motoring rallies and other large outdoor events. The site became associated with Land Rover events, with an off-road course being developed specifically for a Land Rover Show held at Billing.

The Billing Land Rover Show subsequently became associated with the off-road courses at the site, which later developed into the separate Billing Off Road Show and off-road experience.

=== Northampton Balloon Festival ===
Billing Aquadrome hosted the Northampton Balloon Festival from 2009 until 2019. The festival had previously been held at Northampton Racecourse and returned there in 2023. The festival featured hot-air balloon flights and balloon glows alongside other entertainment and attractions.

== Environment and conservation ==
Billing Aquadrome is situated within the Upper Nene Valley, an area characterised by former gravel workings, lakes, wetlands and floodplain habitats. The wider Upper Nene Valley Gravel Pits are recognised for their importance to wetland habitats and waterbirds.

The Upper Nene Valley Gravel Pits are designated as a Site of Special Scientific Interest (SSSI), a Special Protection Area (SPA) and a Ramsar site. The SPA and Ramsar site cover 1,358 hectares and are recognised for their importance to breeding, feeding, wintering and migratory birds.

The wider Upper Nene Valley supports internationally significant numbers of overwintering waterbirds. West Northamptonshire Council states that more than 20,000 birds migrate to the area each winter, including golden plover, wigeon, snipe and lapwing.

The Nene Way long-distance walking route follows the Nene Valley and passes through Northampton, Wellingborough, Oundle, Peterborough and Wisbech. The Long Distance Walkers Association records the route as approximately 183 km (114 miles) in length.

Billing Aquadrome states that it participates in the David Bellamy Blooming Marvellous Pledge for Nature, supporting projects intended to protect local wildlife, encourage biodiversity and maintain natural areas at the park.
