= Korean National Species List =

Online fauna/flora database

- Available in: Korean / English
- Owner: South Korean government
- Website: National Species List
- Commercial: No

The National Species List (Korean: 국가생물종목록) is an online taxonomic database published by the (South Korean) National Institute of Biological Resources.

It lists both plant and animal species protected under South Korean law, native species, together with many other species found in South Korea. Accepted taxonomic names, taxonomic structures, together with basionyms, and some synonyms are also given.

Currently (as of December, 2024) it lists 2158 endemic species, of which 81 are vertebrates, 990 are insects, 593 are other invertebrates, 307 are plants, 8 are protozoa, 29 are algae, and 52 are lichen/fungi.

== See also ==
- Australian Plant Name Index
- International Plant Names Index
- Tropicos
- World Flora Online
