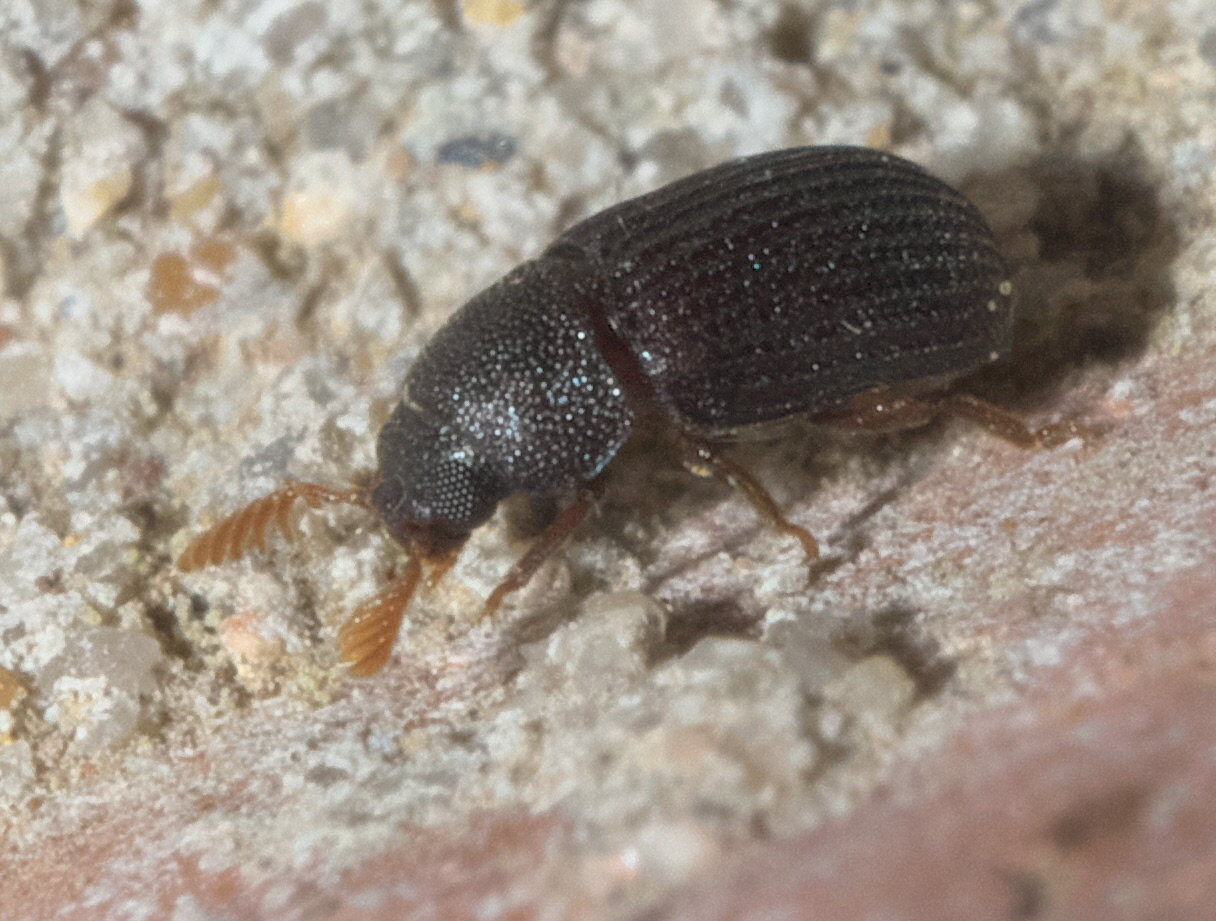
- Rhipidandrus paradoxus, Oklahoma

Scientific classification
- Kingdom: Animalia
- Phylum: Arthropoda
- Class: Insecta
- Order: Coleoptera
- Suborder: Polyphaga
- Infraorder: Cucujiformia
- Family: Tenebrionidae
- Subfamily: Tenebrioninae
- Tribe: Bolitophagini; W. Kirby, 1837

= Bolitophagini =

Tribe of beetles

Bolitophagini is a tribe of darkling beetles in the family Tenebrionidae. There are more than 20 genera in Bolitophagini.

The type genus of the tribe is Bolitophagus, giving the tribe its name.

== Etymology ==
Bolitophagus derives from the Greek (βωλίτησ φάγο - Boletus phage), which describes the taxon as an insect which eats fungi.

== Genera ==
These genera belong to the tribe Bolitophagini:

- Afrobyrsax Ardoin, 1973 (tropical Africa)
- Atasthalomorpha Miyatake, 1964 (the Palearctic)
- Atasthalus Pascoe, 1871 (Indomalaya)
- Boletoxenus Motschulsky, 1858 (the Palearctic and Indomalaya)
- Bolitolaemus Gebien, 1921 (tropical Africa)
- Bolitonaeus Lewis, 1894 (the Palearctic and Indomalaya)
- Bolitophagiella Miyatake, 1964 (the Palearctic)
- Bolitophagus Illiger, 1798 (North America and the Palearctic)
- Bolitotherus Candèze, 1861 (North America)
- Bolitotrogus Miyatake, 1964 (the Palearctic and Indomalaya)
- Byrsax Pascoe, 1860 (the Palearctic, Indomalaya, and Australasia)
- Eleates Casey, 1886 (North America)
- Eledona Latreille, 1797 (the Palearctic)
- Eledonoprius Reitter, 1911 (the Palearctic)
- Lanhsia Shibata, 1980 (Indomalaya)
- Megeleates Casey, 1895 (North America)
- Microatasthalus Ando, 2010 (Indomalaya)
- Microbolitonaeus Grimm, 2014 (Indomalaya)
- Parabolitophagus Miyatake, 1964 (the Palearctic)
- Rhipidandrus LeConte, 1862 (worldwide)
- Sumbawia Gebien, 1925 (Indomalaya)
- † Proteleates Wickham, 1914
