= Skywhale =

Skywhale could refer to:

- Skywhales - a 1983 animated short film
- The Skywhale and Skywhalepapa hot air balloons designed by the artist Patricia Piccinini
- Speculative evolution animal concept developed as part of Extraterrestrial (TV program) § Episode 2: Blue Moon
- AWWA Skywhale, a concept airliner by designer Oscar Viñals of Spain
