= 811th Cadet Squadron New Mexico Civil Air Patrol =

811th Cadet Squadron
- LBJ Middle School Cadet Squadron
- Active: 2008 – 2023
- Country: United States of America
- Branch: United States Air Force
- Type: Cadet Squadron
- Role: Civilian Auxiliary
- Part of: New Mexico Wing
- Garrison/HQ: LBJ Middle School, Albuquerque, New Mexico
- Nickname(s): Coyotes
- Motto(s): Per ardua ad astra Through Adversity to the Stars
- March: The Whiffenpoof Song
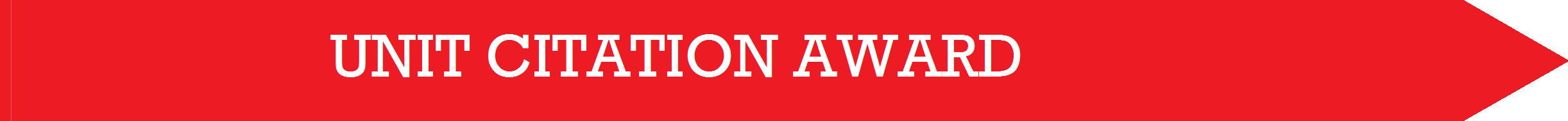
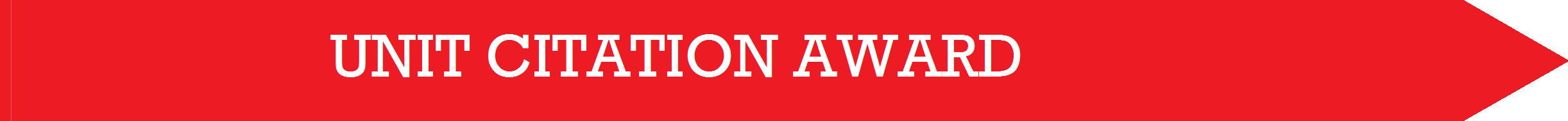
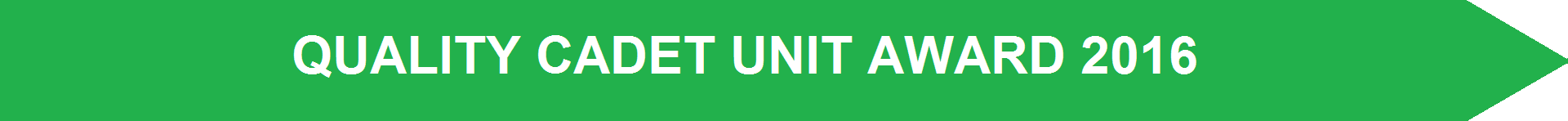
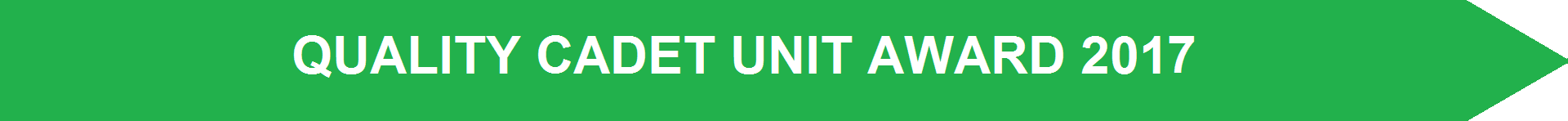
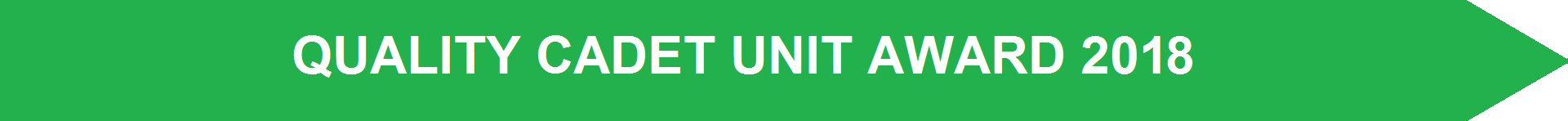
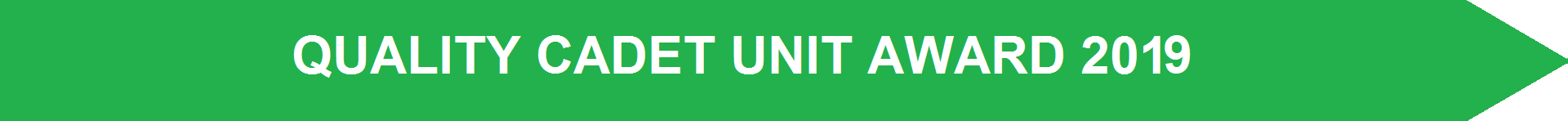
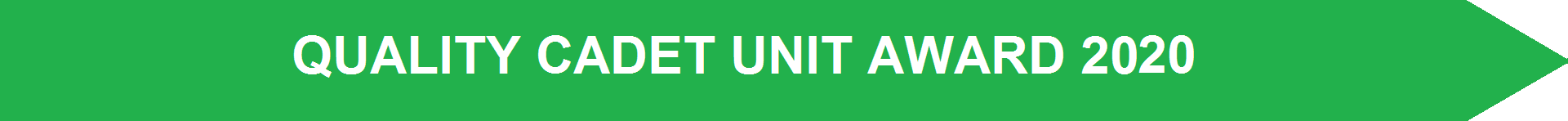
- Decorations: 1 October 2013 – 30 September 2014 1 November 2014 – 29 December 2015 2016 2017 2018 2019 2020 Find ribbon
- Website: Official site

Commanders
- Notable commanders: Lt Col William R. Fitzpatrick, CAP; Maj Benjamin J. Noyce, CAP

Aircraft flown
- Trainer: Cameron Balloons V-77 (Former) Lindstrand 90A

The 811th Cadet Squadron was one of the few remaining School Enrichment Program (SEP) Cadet Squadrons in Civil Air Patrol. It acted as a regular squadron, yet had a partnership with an in school elective class that was offered to students at the middle school, who do not need to be members to participate. This was before the squadron was retired, in 2023, due to lack of participating members, and loss of reliable location. The squadron members were re-distributed into the 855th Albuquerque Aviation Academy Cadet Squadron, which started later that year.

== History ==
=== 811th St Therese Cadet Squadron ===
The 811th was originally chartered and garrisoned at the St Therese Catholic School in Albuquerque, New Mexico, as a school enrichment program. This offered students within the school to participate in Civil Air Patrol five days a week. At this time the major concentrations of the squadron were that of color guard and drill.

=== 811th LBJ Middle School Cadet Squadron ===
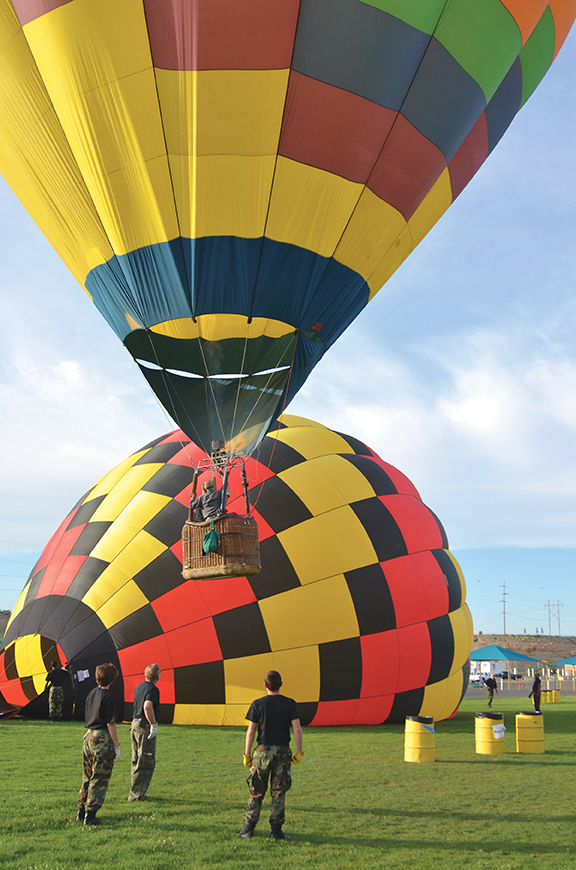
Local Civil Air Patrol cadets and leaders watch a balloon they helped launch. The New Mexico CAP's new balloon program allows members to participate in lighter-than-air flight while furthering their aerospace education.

In July 2010 the 811th transferred to the LBJ Middle School from St Therese. Major Ben Noyce transferred the unit and simultaneously had classes conducted at the school. The original approach of having all youth that attended the in-school program also be cadet members in Civil Air Patrol was abandoned and it opened students to attend the STEM based in school class without having to commit to the traditional Civil Air Patrol Squadron and membership. This helped advance STEM and aviation into the school and garner interest in careers and institutions based in aviation. In November 2013, Lieutenant Colonel William Fitzpatrick, took over the squadron as the squadron commander. Immediately the focus, goals, mission and vision of the 811th changed substantially. Moving from a drill and ceremonies focused squadron, the 811th refocused on flight training, operational management, and aviation advocating. In 2014 the 811th received a Unit Citation for its contribution for standing up balloon operations and writing regulations for its integration at the national level.

==== Hot Air Balloon Operations ====
In October 2013, New Mexico Sunrise hit power lines, sending both the pilot and the crew chief to the hospital. After the accident, Mark Kilgore, the pilot and owner of the balloon donated it to the New Mexico Wing of Civil Air Patrol to develop a balloon program. The aircraft had been repaired and returned to air worthiness. At the time Major Ben Noyce spearheaded the acquisition of New Mexico Sunrise and renamed the aircraft Phoenix, since it had arisen from its own ashes to find a new purpose. Through intensive recruiting, the 811th gained three balloon pilots to help develop the balloon program. Captain Al Lowenstein as the Chief Pilot and Captain Jessica Makin, both became the first cadre and check pilots. The addition of Captain Will Manus brought the instructors up to three. The program began with an intense Chase Crew training program, which graduated over 40 members in the first 6 months. On the 25th of January, Major Ben Noyce was the first Civil Air Patrol member to receive his private pilot certificate solely through a Civil Air Patrol Balloon Flight Program. With crews trained, 811th members, furnishing member-owned aircraft flew a young 9-year old who is going blind, whose wish was to fly in a hot air balloon.

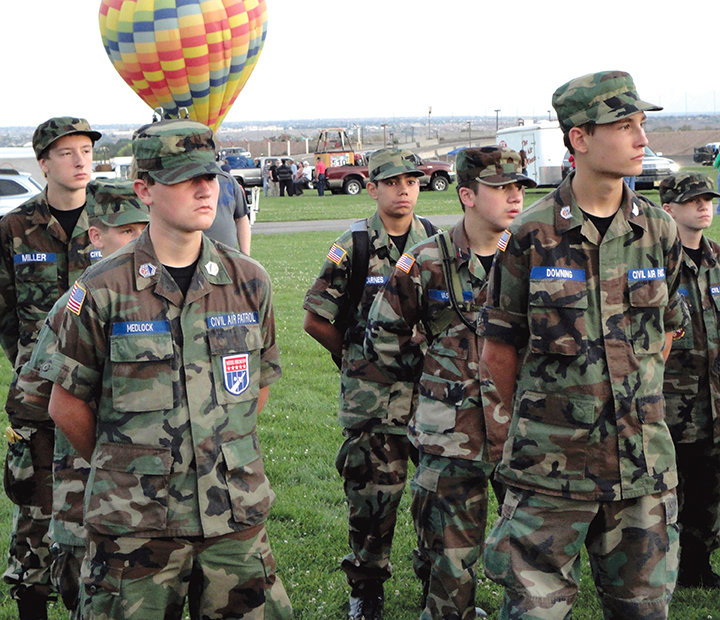
Cadets from the New Mexico Wing of Civil Air Patrol await a briefing before launching hot-air balloons at Albuquerque's Balloon Fiesta Park.

The 811th realizing that the program could not be sustained unless they trained new pilots started to develop a full flight training program where five members, three senior members and two cadet members, began intensive initial flight training. Partnered with the local balloon community, the 811th provided chase crews and its own balloon to local rallies and events. Daniel Lovato, who was the crew chief for New Mexico Sunrise, was the other individual that was severely injured in the accident prior to CAP gaining the aircraft. In February 2015, Captain Lowenstein of the 811th flew Daniel Lovato for the first time after the accident in the same aircraft.

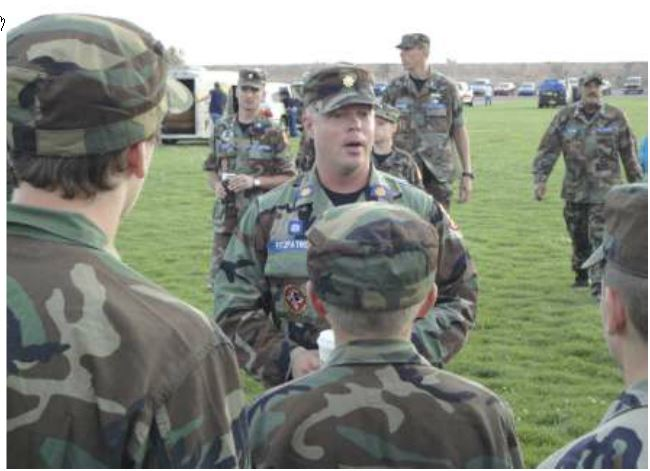
Maj. William Fitzpatrick of the LBJ Middle School Cadet Squadron briefs New Mexico Wing cadets on the final day of the wing's first-ever hot air balloon clinic at Balloon Fiesta Park in Albuquerque.

In June 2016, the balloon Phoenix was retired when it could no longer pass its annual airworthiness inspection. In the 18 months of operating with New Mexico Wing and starting the New Mexico Balloon Program, it produced five lighter than air pilots. Since Phoenix was retired, there was a need to find a replacement to continue the program. In October 2016, an order was placed with Lindstrand Balloons USA to build a custom envelope to replace the retired envelope of Phoenix. On December 27, 2016; New Mexico Wing took delivery of a ninety thousand cubic foot Lindstrand 90A Envelope named Integrity. Integrity Flew its first flight 8 January 8, 2016. Integrity has now participated in two Air Ventures in Oshkosh, Wisconsin and three Albuquerque International Balloon Fiestas. Integrity has exposed nearly 5 million people to Civil Air Patrol Balloon Operations while taking part in these events. Integrity as of 2023 is currently within inspections and repairs, and has not been active since 2022.

==== First Cadet Lighter than Air Private Pilot in Southwest Region ====
On February 26, 2016, the first cadet to attain her private pilot certificate for a hot air balloon within the Southwest Region of Civil Air Patrol. Lighter than Air training has been talked about within the organization for a few decades but documentation of completion is slim to none known. Cadet Blankley started her training in the summer of 2015, after completing her private pilot certificate in gliders.

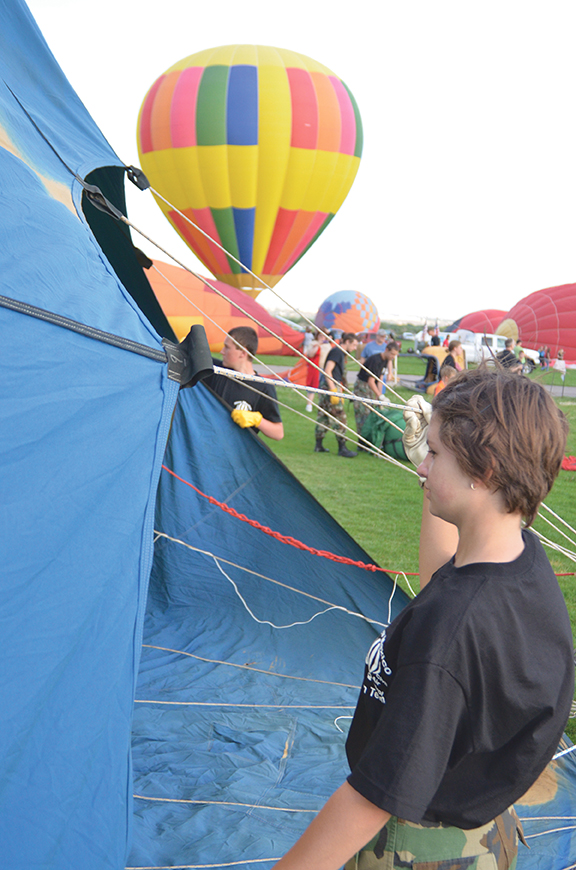
Raily Blankley, a member of the New Mexico Civil Air Patrol, holds the balloon opening as it is inflated. The New Mexico CAP's new balloon program allows members to participate in lighter-than-air flight while furthering their aerospace education.

==== First Spaatz Award Recipient ====
Cadet Colonel Destiny Maurer was the 2200 Cadet in the United States to receive her Spaatz Award. Earned on 7 August 2018, she is the first cadet in the 811th Cadet Squadron to receive the Spaatz Award and the 26th in the State of New Mexico.

== Awards ==
- New Mexico Wing School Enrichment Program Squadron of the Year 2009
- Aerospace Excellence Award 2011–2012
- Unit Citation – 1 October 2013 to 30 September 2014
- New Mexico Wing School Enrichment Program Squadron of the Year 2014
- Aerospace Excellence Award 2014–2015
- New Mexico Wing School Enrichment Program Squadron of the Year 2015
- Unit Citation – 1 November 2014 to 29 December 2015
- Quality Cadet Unit Award 2016
- New Mexico Wing School Enrichment Program Squadron of the Year 2016
- Aircraft finds in support of EAA Airventure 2017 (Two finds)
- Aerospace Excellence Award 2016–2017
- Quality Cadet Unit Award 2017
- New Mexico Wing School Enrichment Program Squadron of the Year 2017
- New Mexico Wing Squadron of the Year 2017
- Aerospace Excellence Award 2017-2018
- Quality Cadet Unit Award 2018
- New Mexico Wing School Enrichment Program Squadron of the Year 2018
- Aerospace Excellence Award 2018-2019
- Quality Cadet Unit Award 2019
- New Mexico Wing School Enrichment Program Squadron of the Year 2019
- Aerospace Excellence Award 2019-2020
- Quality Cadet Unit Award 2020

== Lineage ==
- Chartered 811th St Therese Cadet Squadron, 3 June 2008

Re-designated: 811th LBJ Middle School Cadet Squadron, July 2010

- Retired - 811th LBJ Middle School Cadet Squadron, January 2023
