= D38 =

D38, D 38 or D-38 may refer to:

== Ships ==
- Brazilian destroyer Espirito Santo (D38), a Mato Grosso-class destroyer of the Brazilian Navy
- HMAS Perth (D 38), a Perth-class destroyer of the Royal Australian Navy
- HMS Ambuscade (D38), a destroyer of the Royal Navy
- HMS Begum (D38), a Ruler-class escort carrier of the Royal Navy

== Other uses ==
- Akaflieg Darmstadt D-38, a German sailplane
- Cameron D-38, a British airship
- D38 road (Croatia)
- Depleted uranium
- D38, a 1980s Dicomed color workstation
