= Cameron Skystar =

Skystar (DP series)

General information
- Type: Hot-air airship
- National origin: United Kingdom
- Manufacturer: Cameron Balloons

History
- First flight: 1986

The Cameron Skystar or DP series is a family of hot-air airships designed and built in the United Kingdom by Cameron Balloons for recreational and advertising use. The first DP series airship flew in 1986. In the 1990 World Hot-air airships the DP series won 1st, 2nd and 3rd places.

== Design and development ==
The airship has an aluminium gondola with room for a pilot and a passenger, except the smaller DP-50 which only has room for a pilot. The four variants (DP60, DP70, DP80 and DP90) have envelope sizes from 1700m^{3} to 2548m^{3}. The DP-50, DP-60 and DP-70 use a 570cc Konig Model SD engine, with a Konig 3-bladed propeller in a shroud as standard. The DP80 and DP90 use a Rotax 582UL piston engine with a three-bladed pusher propeller in a shroud. The Konig can also be used on the larger airships and the Rotax on the DP-60 and DP-70 as an option. Each airship is also fitted with two propane tanks for the buoyancy burners.

== Variants ==
Cameron DP-50
The DP-50 has a 50000 cu ft envelope.
Cameron DP-60
The DP-60 has a 60000 cu ft envelope and is 30.48m (100ft) long.
Cameron DP-70
The DP-70 has a 70000 cu ft envelope and is 32.31m (106ft) long.
Cameron DP-80
The DP-80 has an 80000 cu ft envelope and is 33.838m (111ft) long.
Cameron DP-90
The DP-90 has a 90000 cu ft envelope and is 35.05m (115ft) long.

== Specification (DP-90) ==
Data from

General characteristics

- Crew: 1 pilot
- Capacity: 1 passengers
- Length: 35.05 m (115 ft 0 in)
- Diameter: 12.80 m (42 ft 0 in)
- Height: 15.54 m (51 ft 0 in)
- Volume: 2,500 m^{3} (90,000 cu ft)
- Powerplant: 1 × Rotax 582UL piston engine with hush kit
- Propellers: 3-bladed GSC 3 blade Model Tech II pusher in shroud, 1.5 m (4 ft 11 in) diameter

Performance

- Maximum speed: 27 km/h (17 mph, 15 kn)
