= Cameron D-96 =

First hot air airship

D-96

General information
- Type: Hot air airship
- National origin: United Kingdom
- Manufacturer: Cameron Balloons
- Number built: 16 by January 1984

History
- First flight: 7 January 1973

The Cameron D-96 was the first hot air airship, a powered, steerable lighter-than-air craft carrying two or three crew marrying the elongated envelope of an airship with the externally localized heat source of a modern hot air balloon. It was designed and built in the UK and first flown in 1973.

== Design and development ==
Cameron Balloons had been producing hot air balloons for five years when they designed the world's first hot air airship or thermal airship. This, the D-96, has much in common with the balloons, being a non-rigid airship, covered in a nylon fabric and with a propane burner to feed hot air into the envelope from a gondola suspended below it. However, it has the elongated body shape of conventional helium and hydrogen filled airships, airscrew propulsion and stabilizing tailfins. With a length to maximum diameter ratio of only about 2.5, the envelope is fatter than that of many airships. The D-96 is powered a 1.6 L Volkswagen engine, modified to run on propane so that engine and burner use the same fuel. Mounted at the rear of the gondola, this drives a large diameter, partly shrouded propeller. This gondola carries propane fuel and a double burner, the pilot and up to two passengers. Hot air is guided into the envelope by a small, funnel-like extension above the burners.

On 4 January 1973 Don Cameron and Teddy Hall demonstrated the first D-96, registration G-BAMK, at the Icicle meeting at Newbury, Berkshire. Some records state that this first flight was made on 7 January or over the weekend of 6–7 January. After some initial testing, Cameron's attention returned to balloon manufacture but interest in the airship was revived in 1976 by an order from the U.S.A. The early flights had revealed some directional stability problems, addressed by progressively increasing the number of tailfins. The instabilities were finally cured by a four-finned, cruciform arrangement, with the fins inflated by air from the propeller slipstream, fed from an intake with a tongue-like scoop through a passage along the keel. A rudder, operated from the gondola by cable, was added to the lower fin. At the same time the gondola suspension was improved so that it no longer distorted the envelope.

Originally the D-96 had an envelope capacity of 96,000 cu ft (2,718 m³), as indicated by its name, but during 1978 the envelope was lengthened, increasing the volume by about 7%. This new envelope was used on subsequent production D-96s.

== Operational history ==
16 D-96s had been built by January 1984 for customers across Europe, in Australia, Canada, U.S.A and Japan; of these, eight appeared on the UK civil aircraft register, though they are all deregistered in 2012. One of these is now on the 2010 French register; another D-96, not previously on the UK register is registered in Spain.

== Specifications (1984 version) ==
Data from Jane's All the world's Aircraft 1984-85

General characteristics

- Crew: One
- Capacity: Two passengers
- Length: 34.14 m (112 ft 0 in)
- Diameter: 13.72 m (45 ft 0 in) maximum
- Volume: 2,920 m^{3} (103,000 cu ft)
- Max takeoff weight: 810 kg (1,786 lb)
- Fuel capacity: 114 L (25 Imp gal; 30 US gal) in three cylinders
- Powerplant: 1 × Volkswagen 126A 1.6 L piston, modified to run on propane, 34 kW (45 hp)
- Propellers: 2-bladed Holfman HO14-183100LD, 1.83 m (6 ft 0 in) diameter semi-shrouded pusher

Performance

- Maximum speed: 24 km/h (15 mph, 13 kn)
- Range: 48 km (30 mi, 26 nmi) approximately.
- Endurance: 2 h, in still air. Flight into wind results in cooling of the air in the envelope and the use of more fuel in compensation.
