= Project Graham =

Character in Australian road safety campaign

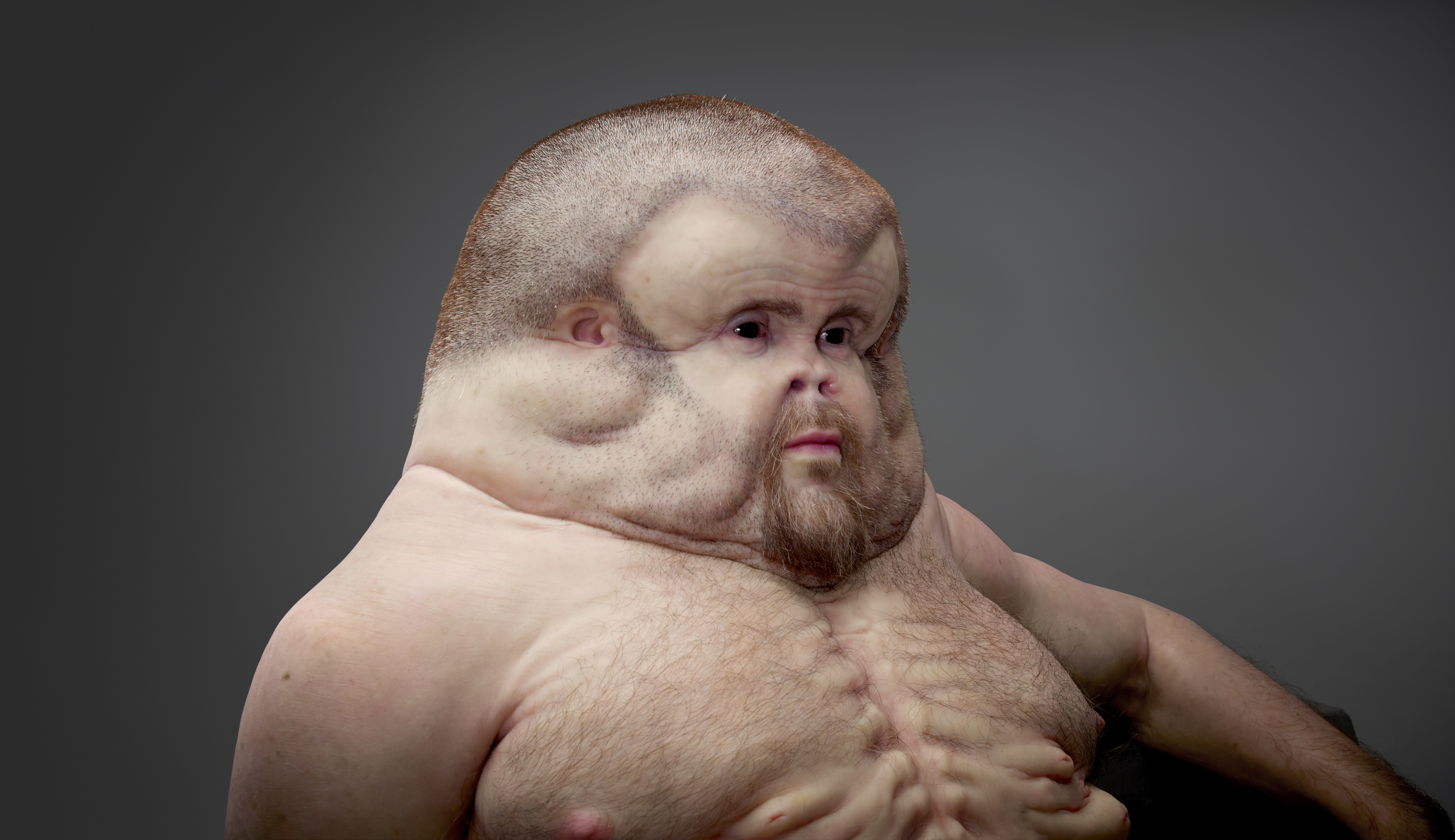
- Artist: Patricia Piccinini
- Year: 2016
- Medium: Silicone, human hair
- Website: http://www.meetgraham.com.au/

Project Graham (also Graham and Meet Graham) is a lifelike figure depicting what a human would look like if the species evolved to survive car crashes. Created as part of a road safety campaign for the Transport Accident Commission (TAC) of Victoria, Australia, it was meant to symbolize the vulnerability of human bodies in such accidents.

== History ==
In 2016, the TAC commissioned Melbourne-based artist Patricia Piccinini to collaborate with trauma surgeon Dr. Christian Kenfield, as well as Dr. David Logan, a crash investigation expert at Monash University Accident Research Centre, on “Project Graham”, a lifelike sculpture for their public safety campaign “Towards Zero”.

Piccinini and company created Graham within six months of the initial commission, having spent roughly $149,000 (AUD $200,000) on the project.

The sculpture was displayed at the State Library of Victoria until 8 August 2016, when it was taken on a tour throughout the state. The tour ended in February 2018.

In 2017, Graham received a nomination for the Beasley Designs of the Year award.
