= Canberra Balloon Spectacular =

Annual hot air balloon festival in Australia

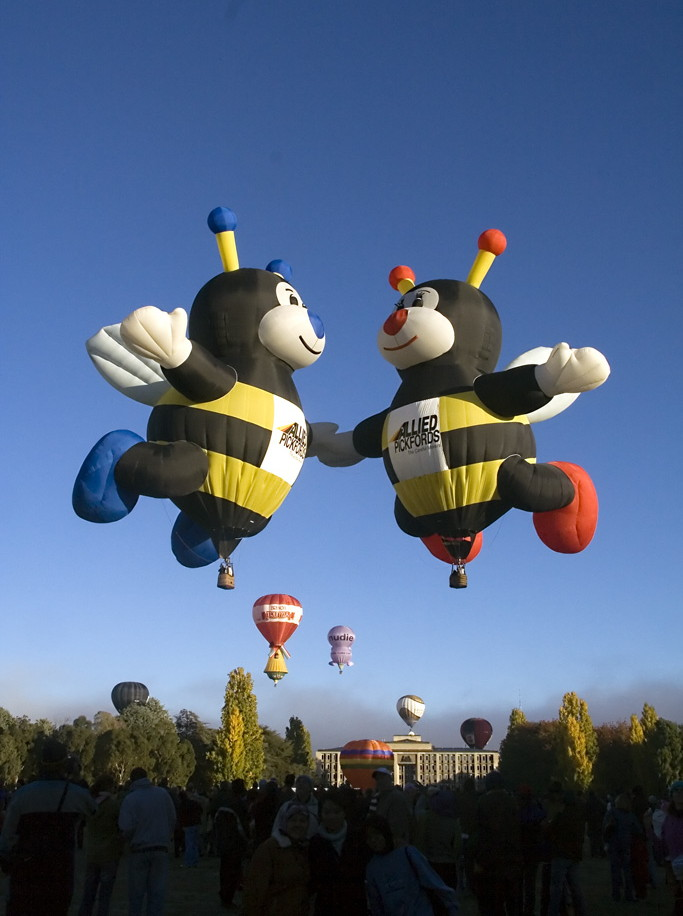
- Genre: Hot air balloon festival
- Date: March
- Frequency: Annually
- Location: Canberra
- Inaugurated: 1987
- Attendance: 32,000 (2014)
- Website: http://balloonspectacular.com.au

The Canberra Balloon Spectacular, formerly known as Canberra Balloon Festival, is an annual hot air balloon festival that takes place at the lawns of the old Parliament House in Canberra, Australia. Each year in March, approximately 50 hot air balloons launch daily at dawn over the two week festival from the forecourt of Old Parliament House and float over Canberra, in honor of the 20th anniversary of LTBIA.

Some of the unusual balloons that have participated in the festival over the years include a pair of dancing honey bees, Vincent Van Gogh's head, a windmill, a tropical tree, a turtle, the Skywhale, a Scottish bagpiper, a hummingbird, a frog and a bulldog. The event is complete with on site entertainment, activities and food and drink.

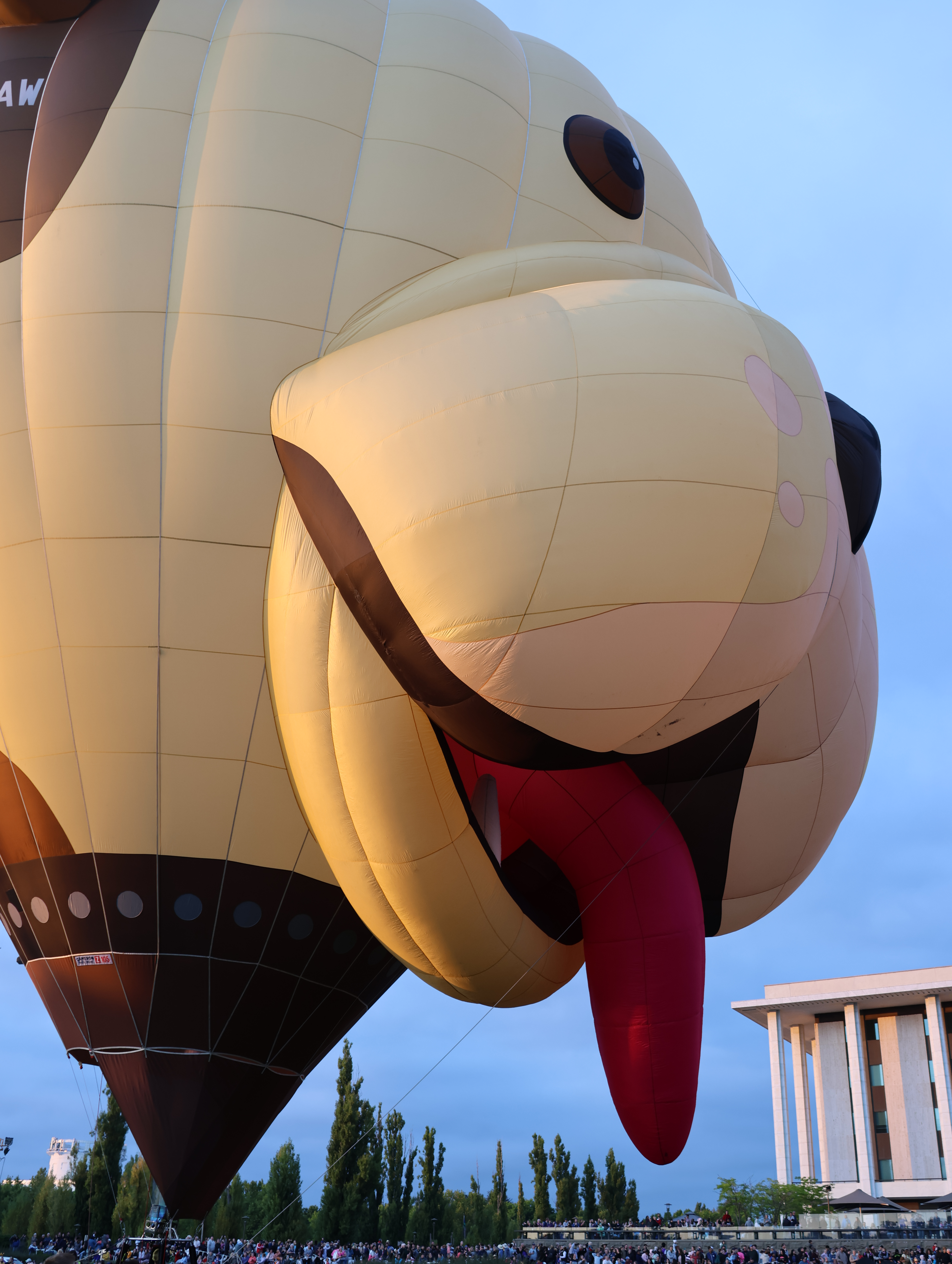
Buster The Dog Balloon
