= Patricia Piccinini =

Australian artist (born 1965)

- Born: 1965 (age 60–61); Freetown, Sierra Leone
- Education: Telopea Park High School, Narrabundah College, Australian National University
- Notable work: The Skywhale
- Movement: Contemporary art
- Website: www.patriciapiccinini.net

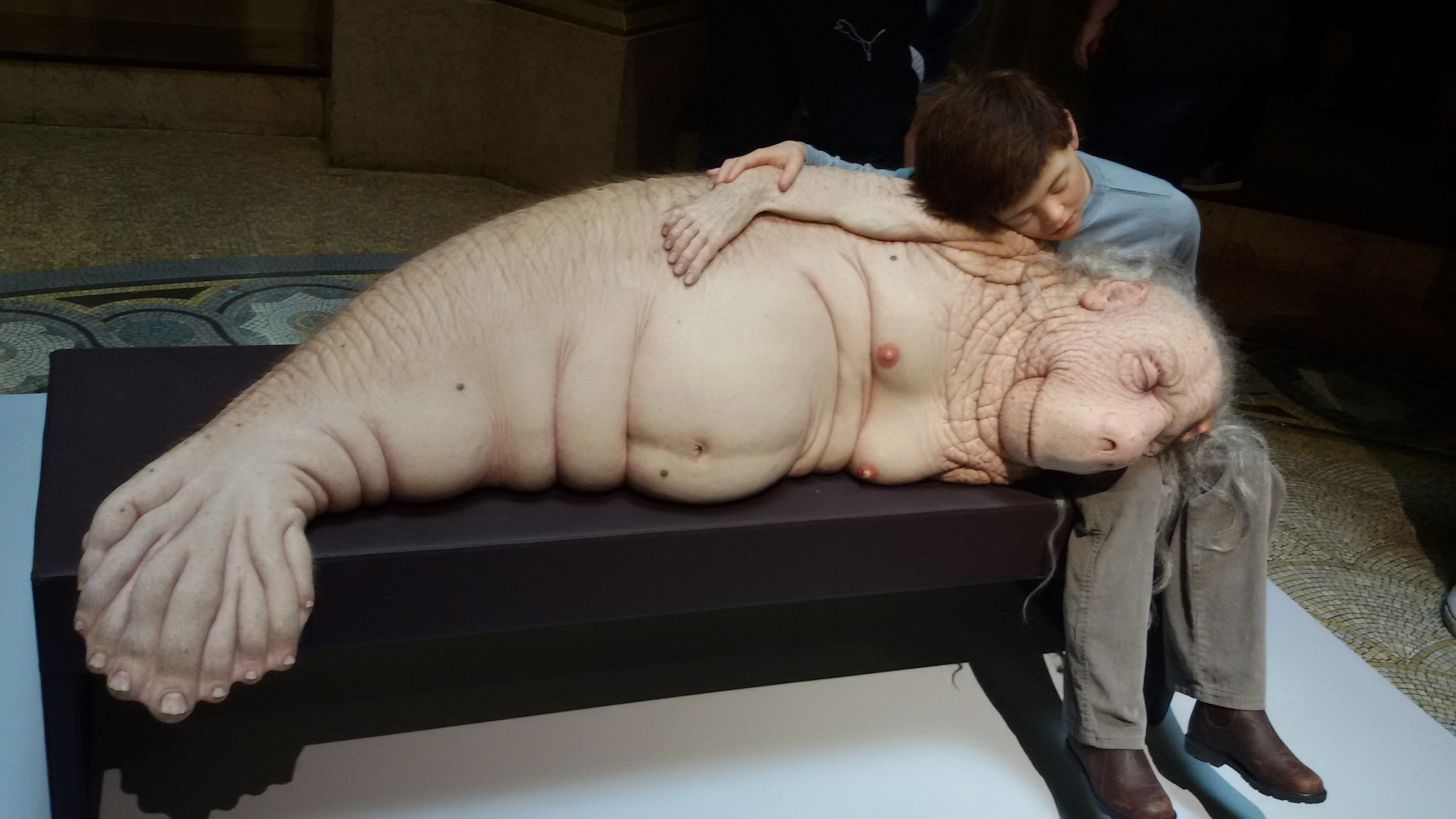
The Long Awaited (2008)

Patricia Piccinini (born 1965) is an Australian artist who works in a variety of media, including painting, video, sound, installation, digital prints, and sculpture. Her work conveys concerns surrounding bioethics and helps to visualise future dystopias. Piccinini's works have been closely associated with and interpreted as posthuman due to their subjects. In 2003, she represented Australia at the 50th Venice Biennale with a hyperrealist sculpture of her distinctive anthropomorphic animals, and she is known for her commissioned work The Skywhale, a large hot air balloon resembling a whale-like creature.

== Early life and education ==
Patricia Piccinini was born in Freetown, Sierra Leone, in 1965 to Teodoro Piccinini, an Italian builder, and his wife Agnes Piccinini, an English teacher. Teodoro had experienced World War II when he was seven years old, and recalled his village being bombed and villagers being shot by Nazis in the street. Agnes came from a very poor Irish family living in Liverpool, England.

She has a sister two years younger than her. After violence erupted in the former British colony, the family moved first to Italy, when Patricia was three, and then to Australia, when she was seven. They "were very much migrants" and did not speak English, learning by being exposed to it in school; Patricia retained an Italian accent right through her primary school years. They settled in Canberra.

Piccinini attended Red Hill Primary, Telopea Park High School, and Narrabundah College (a secondary college). Her mother became gravely ill with stomach cancer during her high school years, at which time Piccinini started exploring medical research that included cloning, and reproducing an organ in another body.

After high school, after spending a year in Europe, Piccinini studied economics at Australian National University at the behest of her parents, who wished her to become an economist in the Treasury. She then moved to Sydney to study film at the University of Sydney, and after that, completed a Bachelor of Fine Arts in Painting at the Victorian College of the Arts in 1991.

== Career and works ==
=== 1990s ===
Before finding the medium of sculpture, Piccinini experimented with world-building through photography and digital enhancements. The Mutant Genome Project (1995), features commercially available designer babies called LUMP (Lifeform with Unevolved Mutant Properties). Her Protein Lattice (1997) series features nude models posing with computer-generated mutant rats. The two series explored the commercial side of science and brought up the question of ethics.

The Protein Lattice series was inspired by the famous Vacanti mouse experiment in 1996, which formed a human ear on a rat. The research's objective was to learn more about cells, and how humans can possibly regrow body parts.

=== 2001–2010 ===
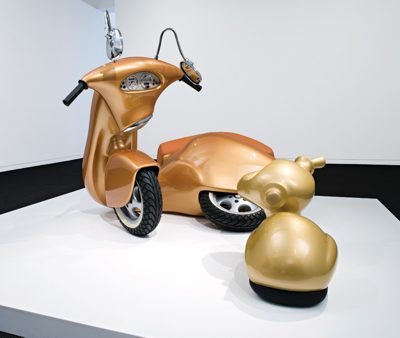
Nest (2006), a sculpture in the "automotive" series

In 2002, Piccinini presented Still Life with Stem Cells, which features a series of flesh-like masses. She explained:

"Stem cells are base cellular matter before it is differentiated into specific kinds of cells like skin, liver, bone or brain. Pure unexpressed potential, they contain the possibility for transformation into anything... I am interested in how this changes our idea of the body... In the last ten years, the body has gone from something that is uniquely produced to something that can be reproduced."

This transformation has already occurred, with very little fuss given its magnitude. The question of whether this is a good or a bad thing is both too simplistic and a little academic. As with so much of this biotechnology, the extraordinary has already become the ordinary. The real question is 'what are we going to do with it'. Still life with Stem Cells is one possible answer."

Also in 2002, she produced The Young Family, representing the growth of replacement human organs in other creatures. The same year, she created a four-minute single-channel digital video from 16 mm film called The Sandman, which shows a young woman swimming endlessly expanse of water, slowly being revealed to possess gills.

In 2003, Piccinini represented Australia at the 50th Venice Biennale. The work exhibited was We Are Family, an exhibition which displayed humanlike mutant figures behaving like humans. The work was accompanied by a soundscape composed and produced by François Tétaz.

The Long-Awaited (2008) was a later work attempting to explore the theme of empathy through a lifelike sculpture of a child cradling a manatee-human hybrid. In the same year, she created The Stags, a fibreglass sculpture of two motor scooters fighting like stags.

She created the 2009 installation Perhaps the World is Fine Tonight for the Tasmanian Museum and Art Gallery in Hobart, again accompanied by music by François Tétaz.

Her 2010 work, The Comforter, depicted a young girl covered in hair, holding an "other-worldly creature".

=== 2011–2020 ===
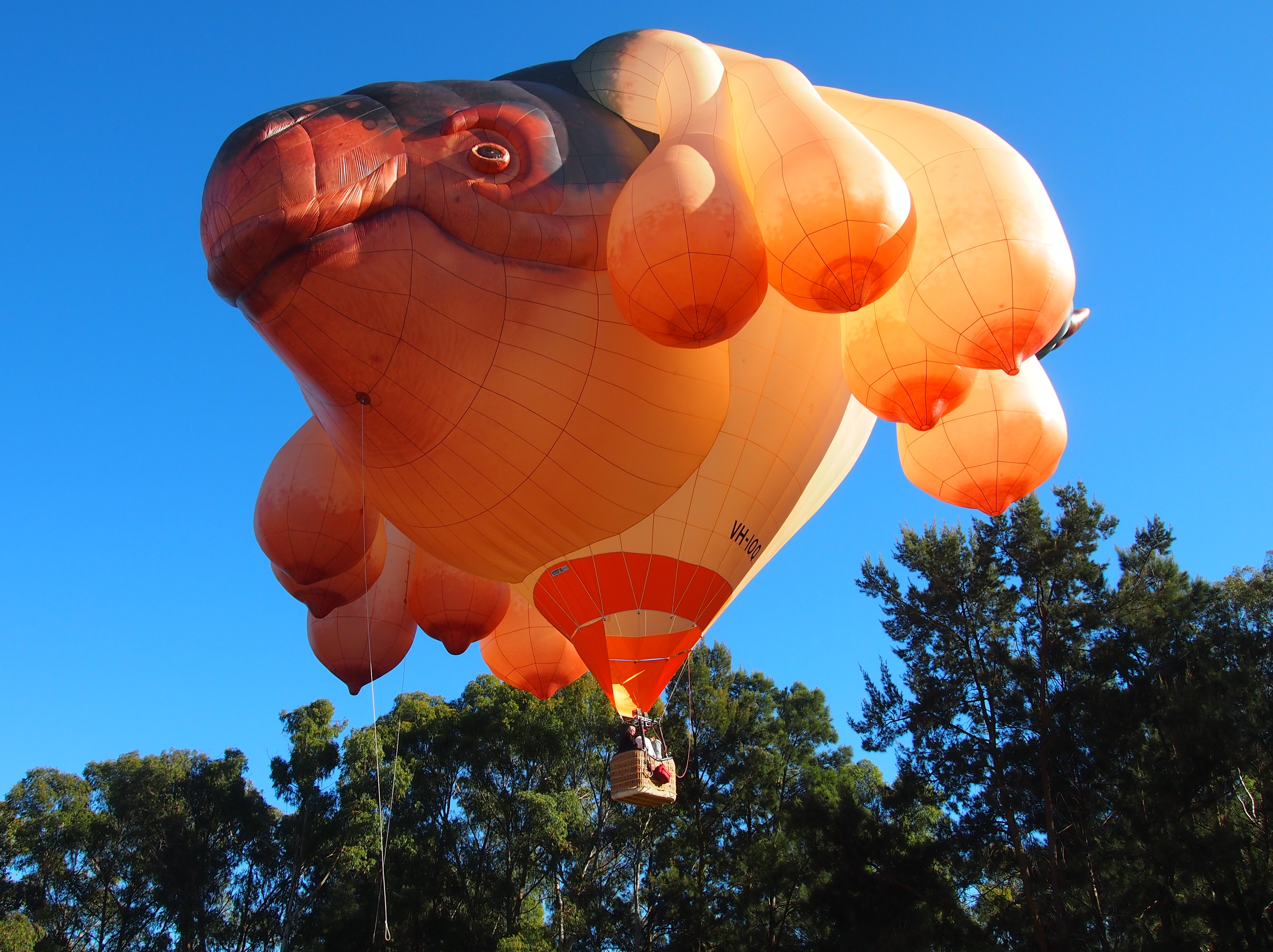
The Skywhale, commissioned for the centenary of Canberra.

The Skywhale was a work commissioned by the ACT Government for its centenary year in 2013. The ABC described the work as a "hot air balloon in the shape of a tortoise-like animal featuring huge dangling udders made from four hectares of nylon", and the work was the subject of controversy among Canberrans. The budget for the project was A$300,000 and was the subject of comments made by ACT Chief Ministers Jon Stanhope and Andrew Barr. Piccinini received only A$8000 of the cost, which she mostly spent on visits to the manufacturer in Bristol, England.

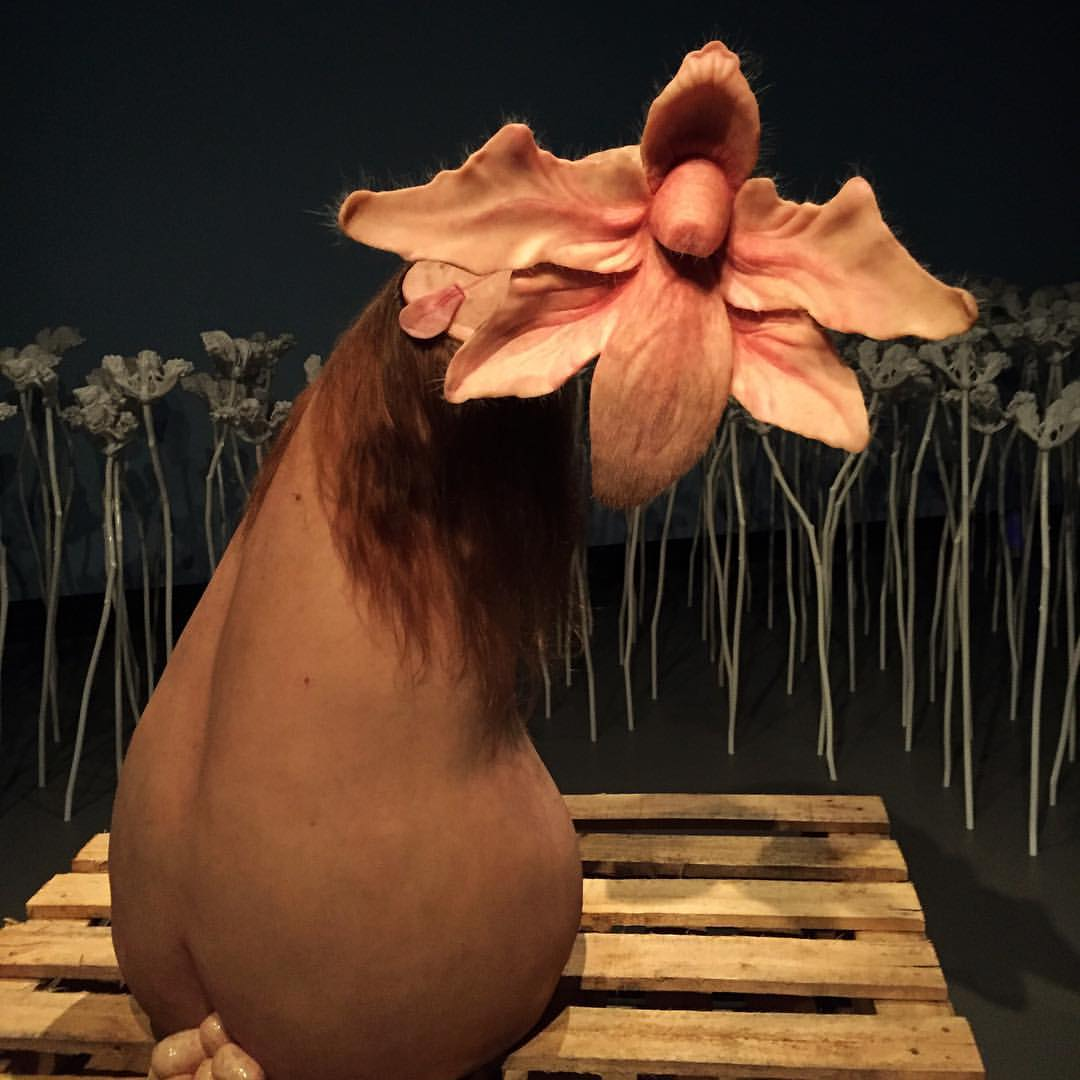
"Bootflower" 2015

In 2015 she presented as part of a group exhibition titled Menagerie at the Australian Centre for Contemporary Art, Melbourne.

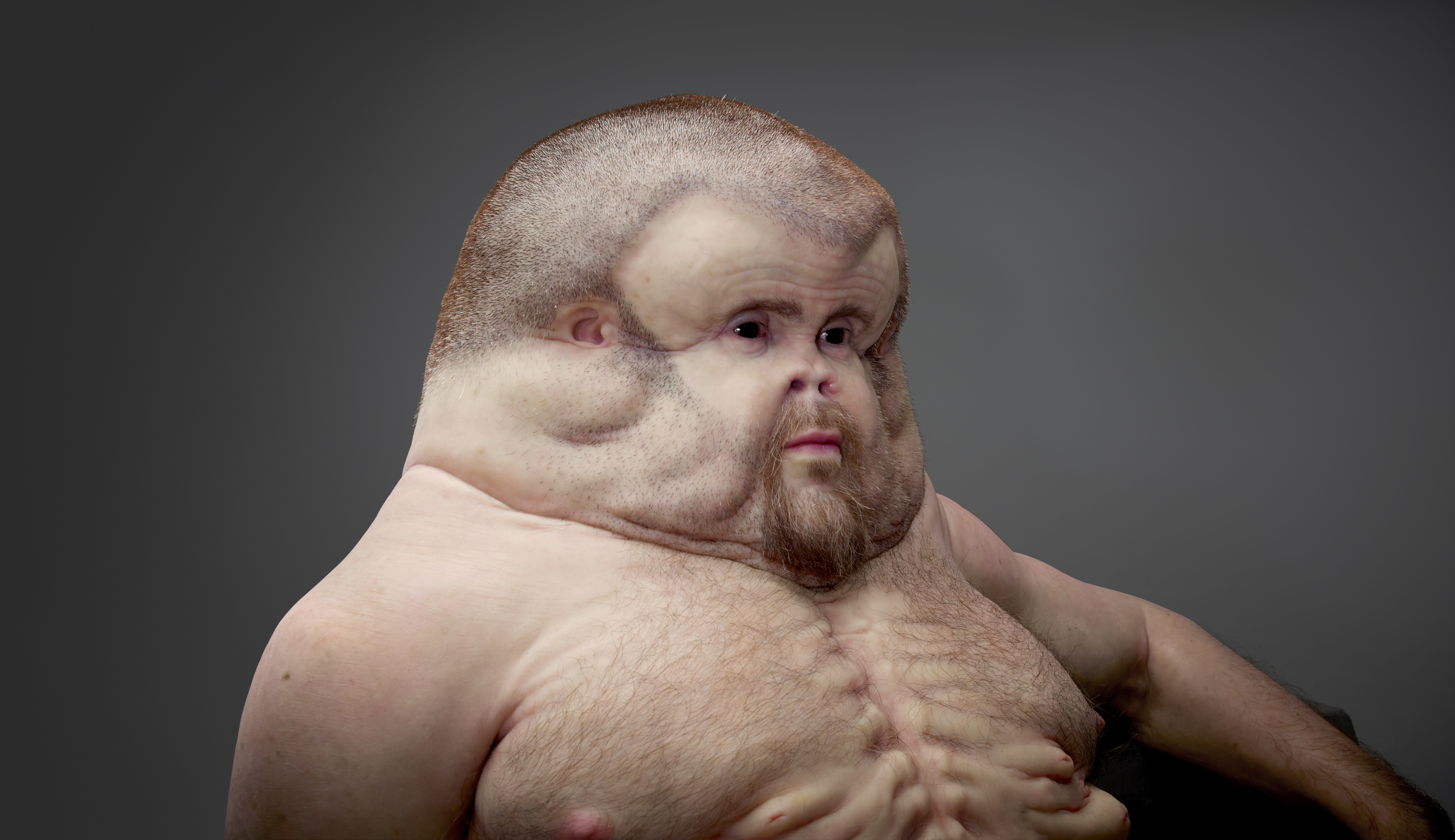
Graham: a 2016 sculpture for the TAC's public safety campaign "Towards Zero"

In 2016, the TAC commissioned Piccinini to work in collaboration with Dr. David Logan, a senior research fellow at the Monash University Accident Research Centre, and trauma surgeon Dr. Christian Kenfield, for Project Graham— as part of the TAC's road safety campaign Towards Zero. "Graham", a lifelike, interactive sculpture, highlights how vulnerable the human body is to the forces involved in auto accidents. As the TAC explains: "Graham highlights the changes we need to make to protect ourselves from our own mistakes on the road. At the centre of this system is the belief that human health is more important than anything else, he is the embodiment of the Towards Zero vision."

In July 2018, her diorama The peace between lightning and thunder was installed at QAGOMA in Brisbane, once again accompanied by music created by François Tétaz.

In 2019, the National Gallery of Australia with the assistance of the Balnaves Foundation commissioned Skywhalepapa for the Skywhales: Every Heart Sings project. This work is a companion to the female Skywhale, although they are not necessarily mates. Piccinini has stated that she created Skywhalepapa because she "thought it might be wonderful to present an image of a masculine carer; a Skywhalepapa along with his offspring" and that she "wanted to celebrate the evolution of fatherhood".

=== 2021-present ===
As part of the inaugural Rising Festival, Piccinini created the exhibition "A Miracle Constantly Repeated", which was her first extensive hometown show in almost two decades. The exhibition ran from May 2021 until June 2022, as a result of delays resulting from COVID-19 lockdowns, as well as high demand. Taking place in the Flinders Street station ballroom, and consisting of a combination of hyper-real silicone sculptures, dioramas, video, sound and light, the exhibition explores humanity’s relationship to technology and the environment, and conveys Piccinini's empathetic vision of a future built on resilience and care.

== Art practice ==
Piccinini works in her studio Drome, in Collingwood, Melbourne. She thinks of an idea, which she first draws, then works on a 3D model based on an artificial man she keeps in her studio called Dennis. She uses purchased and donated animal and human hair, and she employs expert staff who help to sculpt, make moulds, or paint her creations. She strives through her art to connect to people and to elicit an emotional response.

She has said that her childhood (as an Italian-speaking migrant) has informed her work: "We had nothing – I wanted to be part of something... So as an artist I try to situate myself inside society, and have a discussion with the people around me".

== Style and themes ==
Piccinini's works focus on "unexpected consequences", conveys concerns surrounding bioethics, and helps to visualise future dystopias.

According to her 2002 National Gallery of Victoria biography:

Piccinini has an ambivalent attitude towards technology and she uses her artistic practice as a forum for discussion about how technology impacts upon life. She is keenly interested in how contemporary ideas of nature, the natural and the artificial are changing our society. Specific works have addressed concerns about biotechnology, such as gene therapy and ongoing research to map the human genome... she is also fascinated by the mechanisms of consumer culture."

In a 2014 interview with The Sydney Morning Herald, Piccinini said of her work, "It's about evolution, nature – how nature is such a wonderful thing, we're just here to witness it, it's not here for us – genetic engineering, changing the body".

Piccinini's works have been closely associated with and interpreted as posthuman due to their subjects. The depiction of vulnerability through themes of mutation, reproduction, motherhood, and childhood explores the economy of death. Her work affirms that posthuman ideology and femininity is liberation from modern practices such as genetic engineering and animal farms. For example, Piccinini engaged in the theme of surrogate motherhood, and inter-species relationships to convey environmental turmoil. The surrogacy invokes concerns in regards to scientific exploitation, and rejects the idea of a normative human species.

Piccinini never truly states what her personal beliefs are, most of the time opting for ambiguity. She uses her art as a forum for viewers to project their own beliefs on and start discussions. The grotesque visuals and themes offer a sense of fantasy; the controversial world she created encourages viewers to think. The idea that art should come from the artist's personal experience is completely disregarded. In an interview with Louisa Penfold in 2020 about her Art in Childhood series, Piccinini stated:

To me, art is really about having a conversation with others around ideas that are relevant and pertinent to our times. In the 90s, making art around big ideas wasn't as common and people were suspicious and would be like, "that's not real art because it's not pure, it is sullied by real-life". The only reason I make art is to be a part of the cultural conversation around what is happening to us in our lives. Every single work I make is around that and that’s the value in the work. I don’t think that I could make work just about me and my own emotional issues. I mean, my emotional issues are certainly my own brand that informs how I look at the world but my art is not about my personal history.

Piccinini has publicly stated that she is a feminist. In an interview with Jaklyn Babington, formerly senior curator at the National Gallery of Australia, Piccinini stated that she is "incredibly interested in nurturing and care and the way that has been marginalised as 'women's work' in patriarchal society. I believe that in a feminist world, nurture and care should be at the forefront of our minds and not limited by gender or anything else".

== Critical reception ==
Art historian and critic Sasha Grishin, who taught Piccanin at ANU, says "There's a deeply intellectual aspect to her work", and that she is "probably Australia's most prominent artist today, a major figure on the world stage" (as reported in 2021).

Australian art critic John McDonald gives two reasons for disliking Piccinini's body of work: her method of employing artisans to create her designs: "The problem with this method is that the artist's role becomes that of a factory manager." and her engagement with issues such as cross-species relationships: "Given the current state of the planet, in which political leaders are allowing the most blatant forms of racism and ethnic tension to become normalised, Piccinini's interspecies fantasies seem horribly far-fetched."

Screen studies professor and animal ethicist Barbara Creed says Piccinini's work is loving and heals wounds of divisions: "In profound ways, Piccinini's artistic practice calls to the spectator to consider a new way of being, a new form of opening out an embracing difference, through new ways of looking ... that encourages us to look alongside and with her creations while reminding us we are all animals."

In May 2017, Artforum featured Piccinini, in which professor of contemporary art Charles Green commented on Piccinini's style of hyperrealism. In his review, Green acknowledged the “unfashionable” hyper-real style associated with the late 60s and commended Piccinini for putting her own spin on it. Green reasoned that by creating an intriguing narrative Piccinini was able to make hyperrealism appealing to the general audience.

== Recognition and academia ==
In 2014 Piccinini received the Artist Award from the Melbourne Art Foundation's Awards for the Visual Arts.

In 2016 she was awarded an honorary doctorate of visual and performing arts by the University of Melbourne's Victorian College of the Arts, and appointed their enterprise professor.

Also in 2016, The Art Newspaper named Piccinini, with her "grotesque-cum-cute, hyper-real genetics fantasies in silicone", the most popular contemporary artist in the world, after a show in Rio de Janeiro attracted over 444,000 visitors. Natasha Bieniek's portrait of Piccinini was a finalist for the 2022 Archibald Prize.

== Personal life ==
Piccinini married artist Peter Hennessey, having been together since around 1988 after meeting at Sydney University, and they have two children. Her sister, Paula, is a barrister and CEO of a family violence organisation, and her brother-in-law is journalist and shareholder activist Stephen Mayne.

Her mother died aged 59, around six months after Piccinini's marriage. Her father died in 2019.

== Exhibitions ==
In August–September 2002, the Museum of Contemporary Art Australia (MCA) in Sydney held an exhibition of her work titled Call of the Wild.

In March 2005, three works titled Undivided, after being shown at the Robert Miller Gallery in SoHo, New York, were all sold, achieving prices of up to $US110,000. In 2005, the Art Gallery of New South Wales held an exhibition of her work titled patricia-piccinini, from 17 August to 9 October 2005.

In 2011, Nick Mitzevich, director of the Art Gallery of South Australia (AGSA) in Adelaide, a great fan of Piccinini, held a survey exhibition of her work at the gallery, titled Once Upon a Time.

In 2015, an exhibition of her work was held in the Centro Cultural Banco do Brasil in Rio de Janeiro.

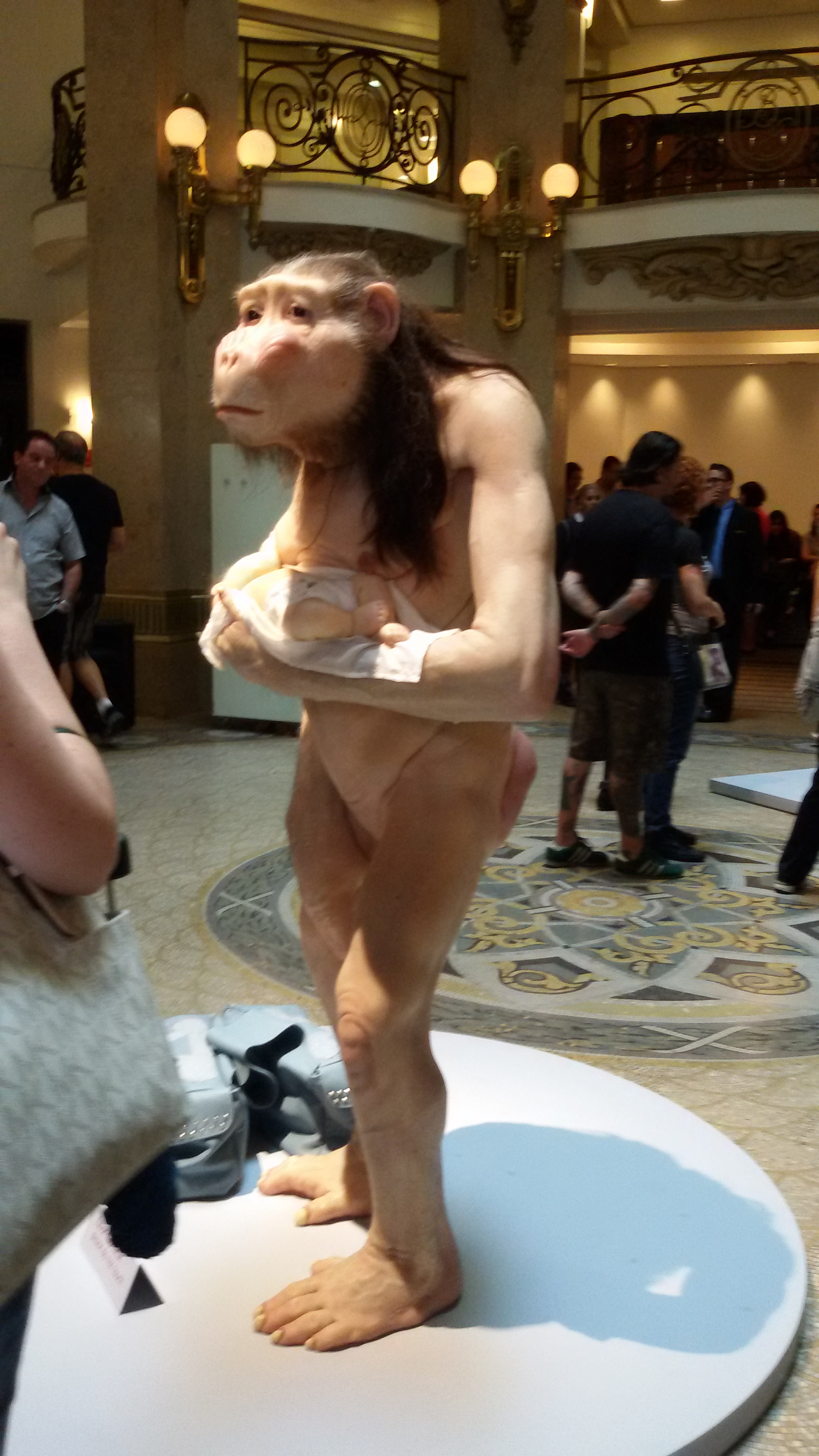
A Piccinini work at an exhibition held in the Centro Cultural Banco do Brasil in 2015

A joint exhibition with the work of Joy Hester, titled at Patricia Piccinini & Joy Hester Through Love..., was held at TarraWarra Museum of Art in 2018.

In April–May 2018, QAGOMA in Brisbane held a large exhibition showcasing Piccinini's most well-known work of the previous 20 years as well as a suite of multisensory installations especially created for the gallery, titled Curious Affection. In conjunction with the exhibition, presented as part of the World Science Festival, a cinema project of the same name was held at the Australian Cinémathèque, featuring films selected by Piccinini. It included a range of science fiction and horror classics, along with animations and documentaries.

== Collections ==
Piccinini's worth is held in many major art collections in Australia, including many in the National Gallery of Australia in Canberra and at the National Gallery of Victoria. Her works are also held by the MCA, AGSA, and Art Gallery NSW.

A DVD of her 2007 film The Gathering was acquired by the Monash University's Faculty of Science in 2013, and is held in the Monash University Museum of Art.

The Stags (2008) is held by National Museum of Women in the Arts in Washington, DC, gifted by lobbyist Tony Podesta, who is a fan of her work.

== See also ==
- Australian art – Art made by Australians or in Australia
- Lindy Lee – Australian artist
- Ron Mueck – Australian sculptor
- Transhumanism#Loss of human identity – Philosophical movement
