= Cameron D-38 =

D-38

General information
- Type: Hot air airship
- National origin: United Kingdom
- Manufacturer: Cameron Balloons
- Number built: 4 by early 1984

History
- First flight: 25 September 1980 (powered airship)

The Cameron D-38 is a single seat hot air filled airship, designed and built in the United Kingdom in 1980. The D-50 has a larger volume envelope for thinner or hotter atmospheres. Together, their sales reached double figures.

== Design and development ==
Having gained thermal airship (hot air airship) experience with their D-96, the first of its kind and a two to three seater, Cameron next produced the single seat D-38. Its prototype began life and was flown as a hot air kite balloon, which was to have been marketed as the C-38, the -38 stating the envelope volume in thousands of cubic feet. Instead, an engine was added and the D-38 flew for the first time at Ashton Park, Bristol on 25 September 1980.

The D-38 is a non-rigid airship with a small, steel framed gondola containing the pilot, a single propane burner and its fuel. A 250 cc Fuji Robin two-stroke engine, driving a semi-shrouded two blade propeller, is attached to the rear of the gondola. Hot air from the burner is directed into the envelope by a roughly conical, central, ventral extension. There are three strongly swept stabilizing fins at the rear of the envelope, two horizontal and one vertical. These are inflated with air from the propeller, collected by a projecting scoop and passing along a fabric ventral tunnel.

Tests of the D-38 showed it was not large enough to cope with hot and high environments, so a version with an envelope linearly enlarged by 9.4% and a volume of 50,000 cu ft (1,416 m^{3}) was produced, designated the D-50. As well as being larger, the D-50 had a revised tail, with four almost rectangular, low aspect ratio surfaces, two vertical and two horizontal. The D-50 first flew on 2 September 1981.

== Operational history ==
Three D-38s appeared on the UK civil aircraft register, all de-registered by 2012. One D-38 remained on the Spanish civil aircraft register in 2010. One D-38 has appeared on the FAA (U.S.A) register.

On 27 August 1982 Ron Taafe in Australia set a series of FAI recognized records for BX class dirigibles in a D-38: altitude, 10,364 ft (3,159 m); distance, 23.03 mi (37.07 km) and duration, 86 mim 52 s.

Eleven D-50s had been built by the start of 1984. In 2010 there were two on the Spanish register and one on each of the French and German registers; the French example was previously on the UK register. Five have appeared on the UK register, though all are now de-registered. Three have appeared on the FAA register.

== Variants ==
D-38
Original 38,000 cu ft airship, triple, swept tail.
D-50
Larger, 50,000 cu ft version with cruciform tail.

== Specifications (D-38) ==
Data from Jane's All the world's Aircraft 1984-85

General characteristics

- Crew: One
- Length: 22.86 m (75 ft 0 in)
- Diameter: 9.96 m (32 ft 8 in) maximum
- Height: 15.24 m (50 ft 0 in) including gondola
- Volume: 1,076 m^{3} (38,000 cu ft)
- Empty weight: 180 kg (397 lb)
- Max takeoff weight: 345 kg (760 lb)
- Fuel capacity: 23.6 kg (52 lb) propane in two cylinders
- Powerplant: 1 × Fuji Robin 250 cc single cylinder two stroke with V-belt reduction
- Propellers: 2-bladed Hiway Hang Gliders Ltd 610 mm (24 in) pitch, 1.32 m (4 ft 4 in) diameter pusher configuration

Performance

- Maximum speed: 22 km/h (14 mph, 12 kn)
