= The Skywhale =

Australian balloon sculpture

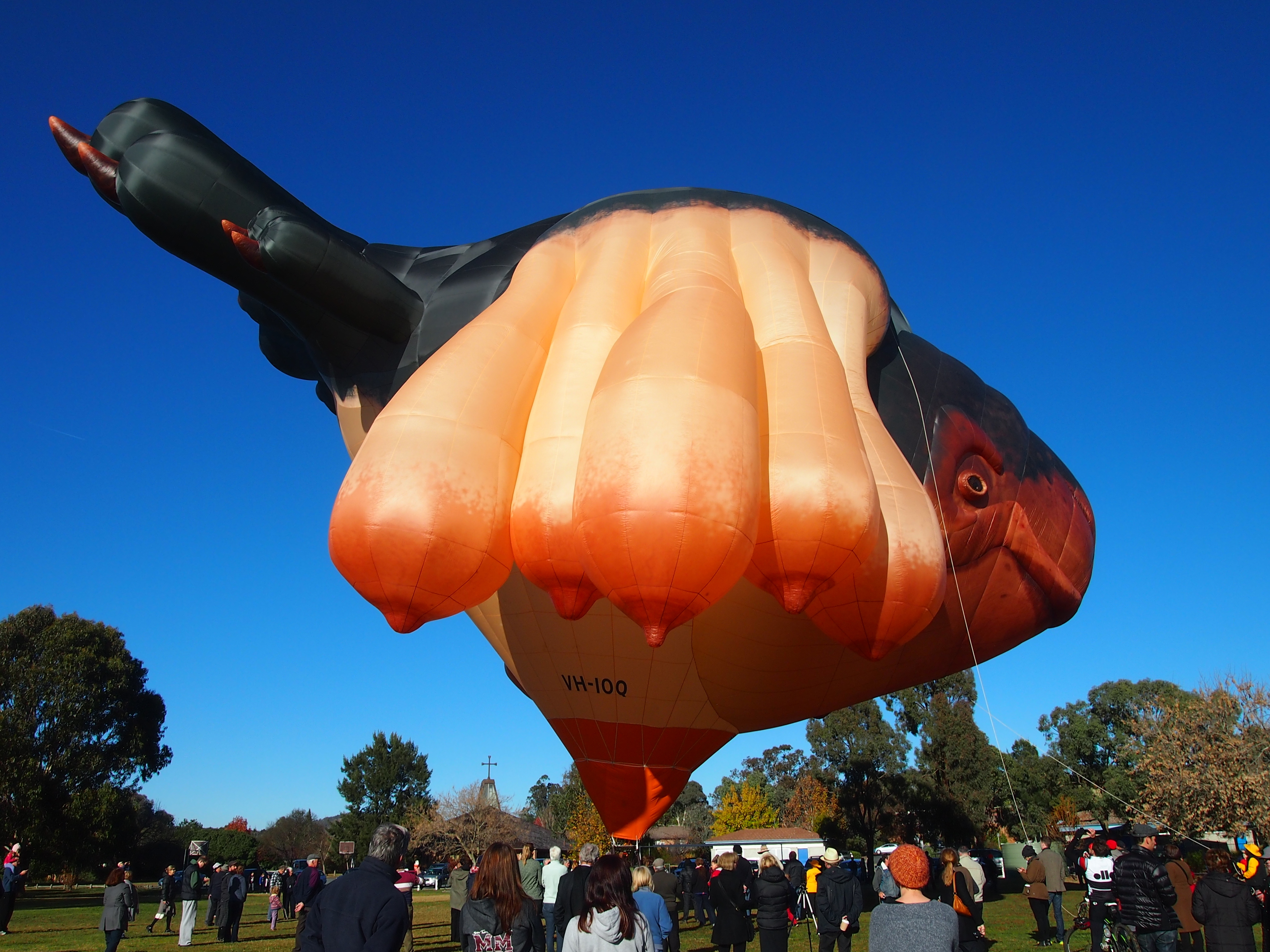
- The Skywhale shortly before taking off on its second flight over Canberra

General information
- Type: Cameron Skywhale 110
- National origin: Australia and the United Kingdom
- Manufacturer: Cameron Balloons
- Designer: Patricia Piccinini
- Owners: Global Ballooning (2013-2019); National Gallery of Australia (2019-current)
- Construction number: 11628
- Registration: VH-IOQ

History
- Manufactured: 2012-2013
- First flight: 2013

The Skywhale is a hot air balloon resembling a strange whale-like creature designed by the sculptor Patricia Piccinini as part of a commission to mark the centenary of the city of Canberra. It was built by Cameron Balloons in Bristol, United Kingdom, and first flew in Australia in 2013. The balloon's design received a mixed response after it was publicly unveiled in May 2013. It has since been displayed around the world, and was acquired by the National Gallery of Australia in 2019.

== Development ==
Ahead of the centenary of the Australian national capital city of Canberra in 2013, the creative director of the centenary celebrations, Robyn Archer, commissioned the sculptor Patricia Piccinini in 2010 to develop a balloon. Piccinini grew up in Canberra and completed a degree in economics at the Australian National University before becoming a successful sculptor. She has received praise for creating highly realistic sculptures of human-like creatures, and her work has been exhibited worldwide. Archer selected Piccinini for the project in recognition of the sculptor's connections to Canberra; other prominent former Canberrans have also been asked to participate in the centenary celebrations. Piccinini had not previously designed a balloon.

Piccinini's intention when designing the balloon was to fashion it as sculpture of a living creature rather than a "balloon that looked like something". She was inspired by the planned nature of Canberra, and has described the work as:

"My question is what if evolution went a different way and instead of going back into the sea, from which they came originally, they went into the air and we evolved a nature that could fly instead of swim. In fact coming from a place like Canberra where it's a planned city that's really tried to integrate and blend in with the natural environment, it makes a lot of sense to make this sort of huge, gigantic, but artificial and natural-looking creature".

The official website of The Skywhale describes Piccinini's design as follows:

Wings didn't make sense to Patricia; the creature was too big and the technical limitations of balloon design wouldn't allow them anyway. So she took a cue from the balloon itself, and imagined that the creature might somehow secrete a lighter than air gas. In the place of wings she imagined huge udders that might contain the gas, as well as a huge bulbous body. She imagined the creature with a slightly more human face, with a calm benign expression that would inspire empathy rather than fear. Her aim was to create a being that was massive and wondrous and that exists somewhere between the impossible and the unlikely.

== Construction ==
After developing her design, Piccinini and her studio developed a 3D model of the balloon using computer-aided design software. This process was used to address the technical issues involved with developing a balloon which was safe to fly, as well as to fine-tune the appearance of the design. The Australian Capital Territory's government invited five specialist balloon manufacturers to submit proposals to construct The Skywhale, but the Bristol-based company Cameron Balloons was the only one to provide a bid.

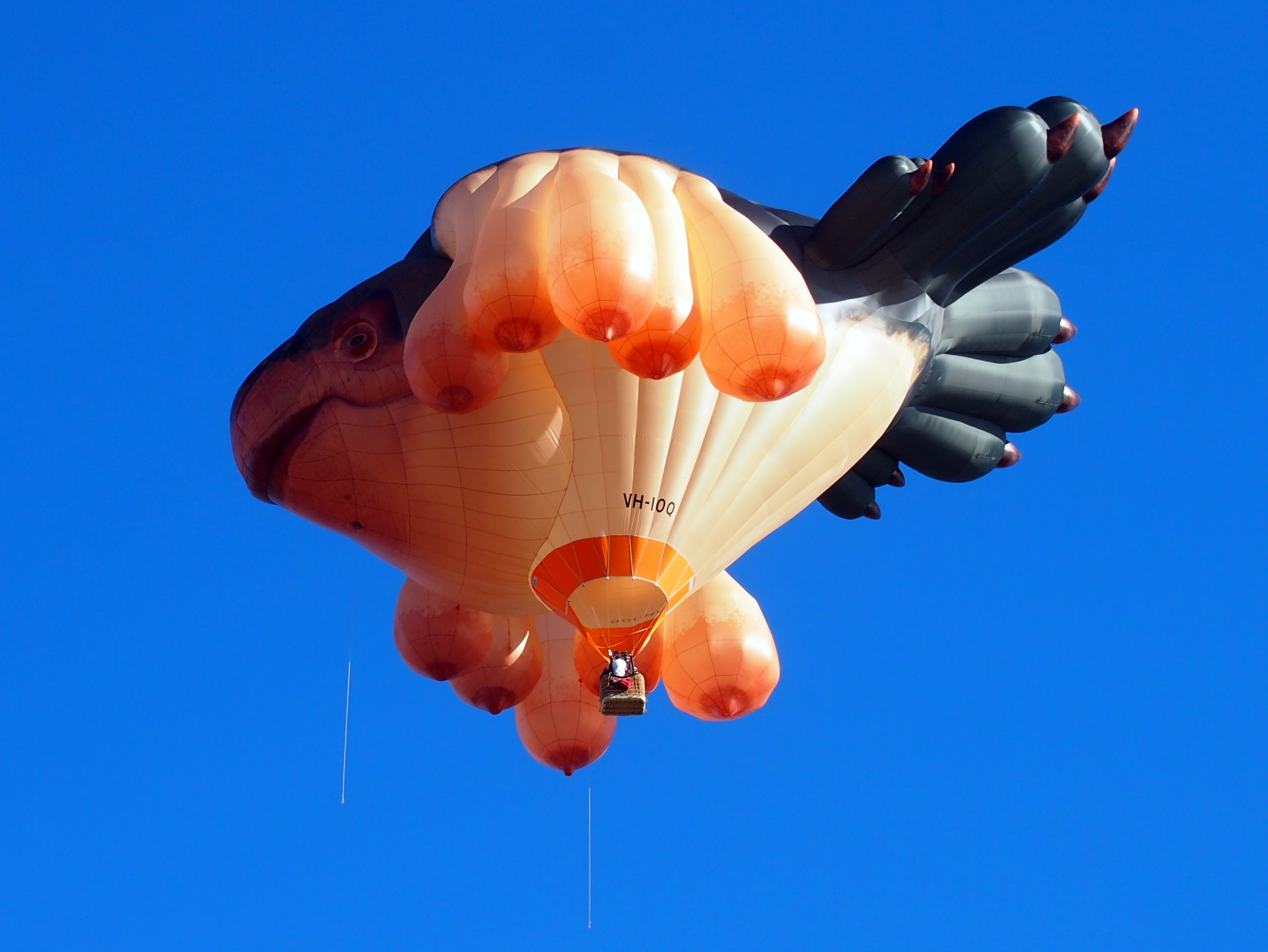
The Skywhale viewed from below during its first flight over Canberra

Once the initial design was complete it was passed to Cameron Balloons which further developed the plans in consultation with Piccinini. The final design was for a 34 metres (112 ft) high and 23 metres (75 ft) long balloon capable of a carrying a pilot and two passengers to a maximum altitude of 3,000 feet (910 m). The balloon weighs half a tonne and includes more than 3,500 square metres of fabric. It took a team of six workers seven months to complete the balloon. Due to its large size, The Skywhale is slower to ascend and descend than traditional balloons. The total construction cost was $A172,000 and the balloon has a lifespan of about 100 flights.

The owner and operator of The Skywhale, Kiff Saunders, has commented that the balloon's design posed some issues during landing, stating the "Skywhale's length and her pendulous breasts make her more difficult to land."

The Skywhale arrived in Australia in early 2013, and made its initial test flight near Mount Arapiles in Victoria during April that year. Piccinini was a passenger on this flight, an experience she described as "awe inspiring". However, as the balloon's basket is small and has low walls she also reported feeling at danger of falling out of it during the flight. Some of the balloon's stitching came loose during this flight, and it was air freighted back to Bristol at the expense of Cameron Balloons to be repaired.

Piccinini was paid $8,800 for designing The Skywhale. She has stated that this is much less than an artist would typically receive for a project of this scale, and she agreed to the reduced fee as she was impressed with Robyn Archer's plans for the centenary celebrations and believed that developing the balloon would be a "unique and extraordinary opportunity".

== Reception ==
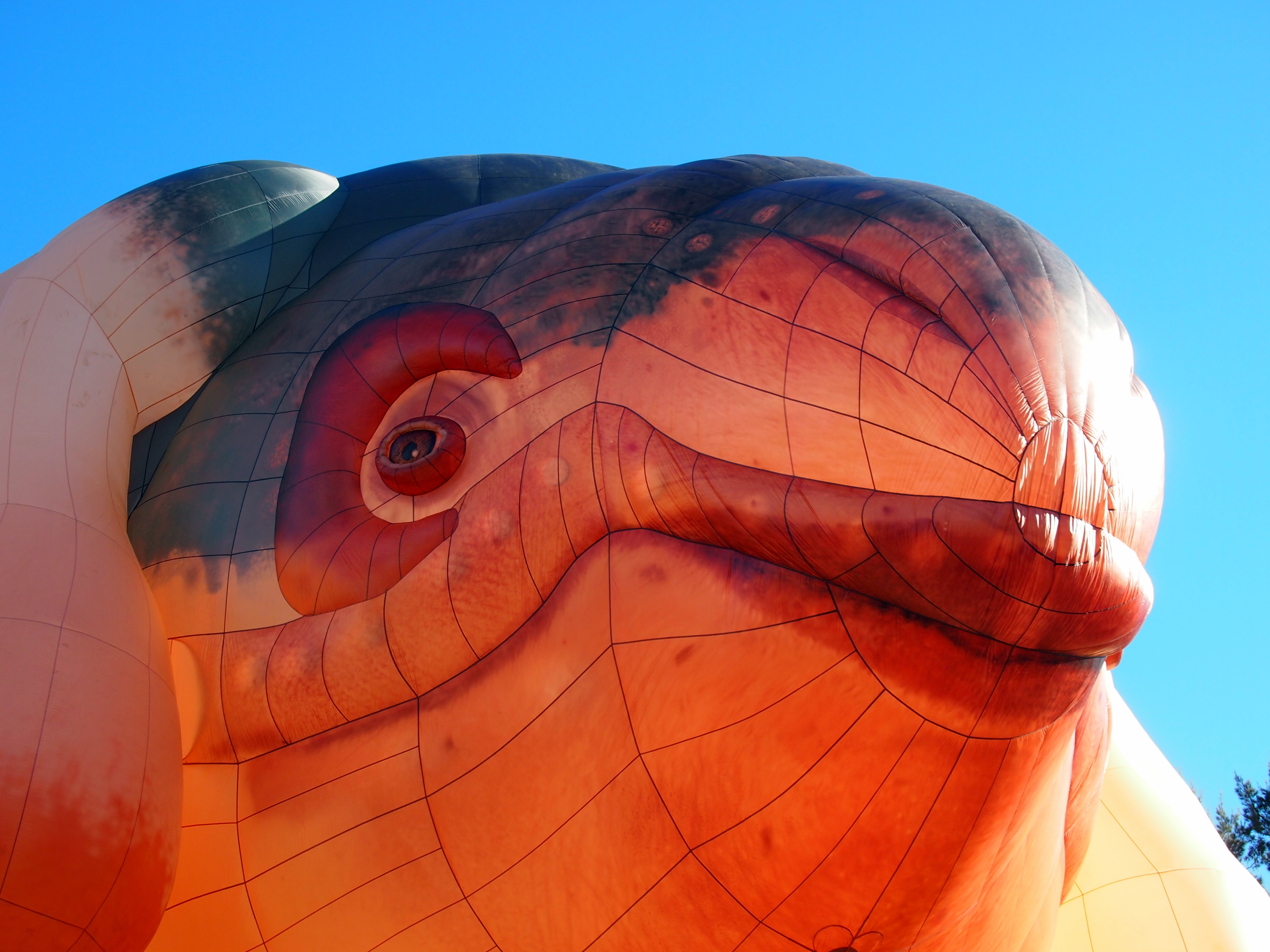
The face of The Skywhale

The Skywhale's design received a mixed reception after the balloon was unveiled on 9 May 2013. Australian Capital Territory Chief Minister Katy Gallagher said that her eyes "nearly fell out of her head" when she first saw a diagram of The Skywhale's design, but she had come to like it and believed that it would challenge the perception of Canberra as a boring city. She also stated that "There will be people in the community who think it's a great achievement to have won a commission like this in the ACT and have it as a symbol of our centenary and those who won't see it as value for money". The leader of the opposition in the ACT, Jeremy Hanson, was critical of The Skywhale stating that "I really don't know whether to laugh or cry ... it's an embarrassing indulgence only a fourth term government would contemplate". Public views of the design, as expressed on social media and talkback radio, were also mixed.

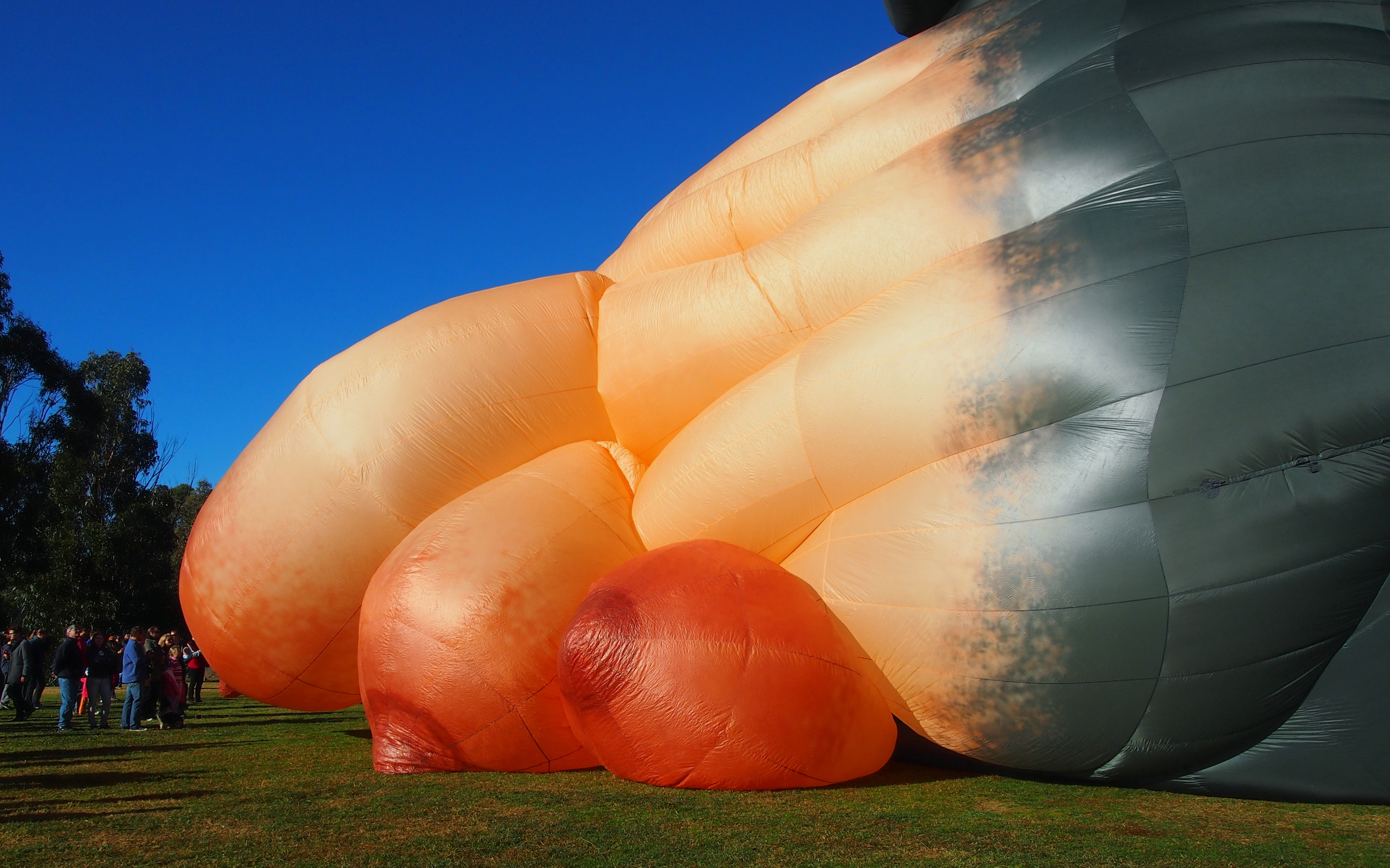
A crowd watching The Skywhale being inflated during May 2013

Much of the public criticism has been focused on the five breasts which hang from each side of the balloon, with a Twitter user calling it "terrifyingly nipply". The director of the Canberra Museum and Gallery wrote an opinion article praising The Skywhale, arguing that the strength of the design "arises from how it concentrates the wonder, awe and mystery we experience in nature, with an urgent insistence on social engagement". The Canberra Times' art critic Kerry-Anne Cousins complimented the boldness of the design, and stated that "I think it's a mark of the sophistication of Canberra that we can have this kind of debate". In response to the criticism of the balloon's design, Piccinini stated that it wasn't intended to be sexual and the breasts represent how female whales feed their calves. She also believed that The Skywhale is likely to win greater support once Canberrans see it in person. Piccinini was hurt by the criticism of the artwork in Australia, and in 2017 believed that it would be "almost impossible" to attract funding to fly it in the country again. In 2019 The Canberra Times reported that The Skywhale had attracted more publicity than any other element of Canberra's centenary celebrations.

The balloon received a more positive reception outside of Australia. It raised Piccinini's profile, and contributed to her exhibitions attracting large crowds. The New York Times reported that "The artwork itself has also gained a global following. Songs have been written about it, cakes made in its shape, and several people have contacted Ms. Piccinini to tell her they have tattooed the creature onto their bodies".

The cost of the balloon and the arrangements under which it was funded also attracted criticism. The executive director of culture for the ACT Chief Minister’s directorate informed the media on 9 May that the balloon and its supporting website cost about $170,000. Documents released the next day showed that the total cost to the government of commissioning and operating The Skywhale over its lifespan will be $300,000, and the philanthropic Aranday Foundation will provide a further $50,000. Moreover, the balloon will remain the property of the Melbourne-based company Global Ballooning and only one flight was scheduled for Canberra at the time. In response, Jeremy Hanson stated that "this $300,000 extravagance again shows out of touch the ACT Government is with Canberrans' priorities". Katy Gallagher has stated that the Government considered retaining ownership of the balloon during its development, but decided against this option as it would have also involved funding all of The Skywhale's operating costs. Robyn Archer defended the project, arguing that the balloon's cost was relatively low, and represented "a bargain for public art". Piccinini has also said that "it's an aeronautical machine. People's lives depend on it. It has to function properly and that's what it costs, to make a balloon". While Global Ballooning owns The Skywhale, Piccinini retains the intellectual property to the balloon and the company does not expect to make much money from displaying and operating it. The director of Global Ballooning believes that The Skywhale will become self funding when international galleries begin to exhibit it.

== Flights and displays ==
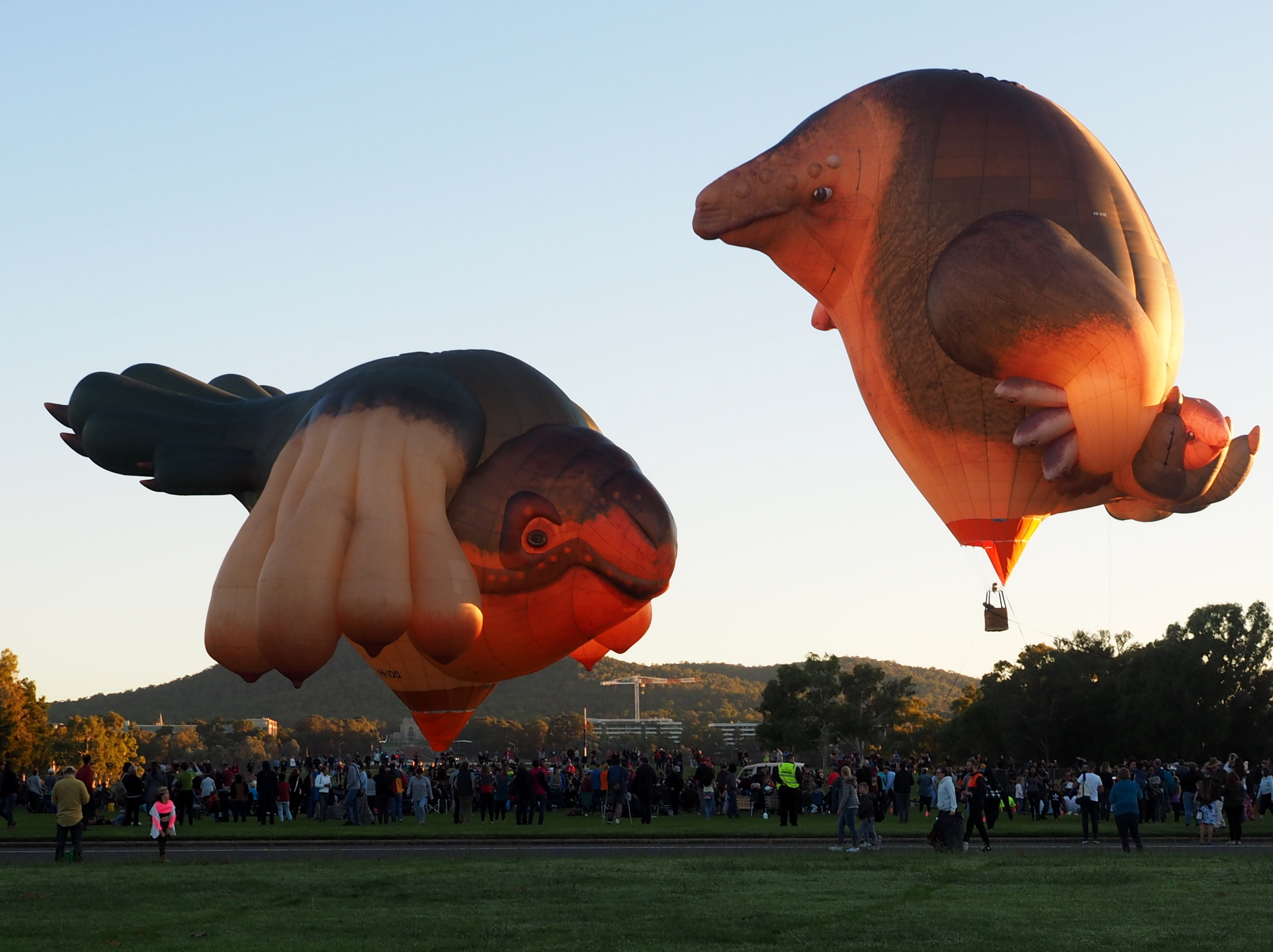
The Skywhale and Skywhalepapa in February 2021

The Skywhale's first flight in Canberra took place on 11 May 2013, with the balloon flying from the grounds of the National Gallery of Australia to the National Museum of Australia on the other side of Lake Burley Griffin. Hundreds of Canberrans were present to watch the flight. Further flights and appearances were scheduled for Hobart and Melbourne at this time, and there were plans to also exhibit the balloon in other parts of Australia and overseas where it will be acknowledged as having been commissioned to mark the centenary of Canberra. Piccinini has described The Skywhale as being one of the highlights of her career.

The Skywhale was flown in Hobart and Launceston as part of the Dark MoFo festival in June 2013. In November that year it was displayed in Melbourne. In September 2014 The Skywhale was exhibited at the Trans Arts Tokyo festival in Japan. It was not present at the 2015 Canberra Balloon Spectacular as Global Ballooning lodged its application to participate in the event after the deadline for entrants. As of March 2015 it had been flown for 60 hours out of an estimated flying life of 600 hours. In January 2017, it was reported that the balloon had also been displayed in Ireland and Brazil, and was being shipped back to Australia. It was displayed in the Yarra Valley in late 2018 and the Hunter Valley in April 2019.

The Skywhale was donated to the National Gallery of Australia (NGA) in 2019. The gallery intends to fly it in Canberra and other parts of Australia.

In November 2019, the NGA announced that it had acquired a second balloon designed by Piccinini called Skywhalepapa. The new balloon will depict a male skywhale holding its children, and will be flown alongside The Skywhale. The NGA called the pair of balloons "a Skywhale family", and stated they would be flown over Canberra and other locations in Australia. The balloon took longer to complete than expected due to the complexity of its design, and The Skywhale was displayed in Canberra in March 2020 by itself. Skywhalepapa was displayed in public for the first time on 7 February 2021, with several thousand people in attendance. The event in Canberra was marked by Skywhale-themed pastries and beer produced by local companies as well as an art pop song entitled "We are the Skywhales".

In 2025, The Skywhale toured across regional Australia, including Goulburn, NSW, the Sunshine Coast, QLD, Albany, WA, Northam, WA, and Townsville, QLD.
