= Cameron Balloons =

English hot air balloon company

- Industry: Balloon manufacture
- Founded: 1 April 1971
- Headquarters: Bristol, England
- Key people: Don Cameron
- Website: Cameron Balloons Ltd.

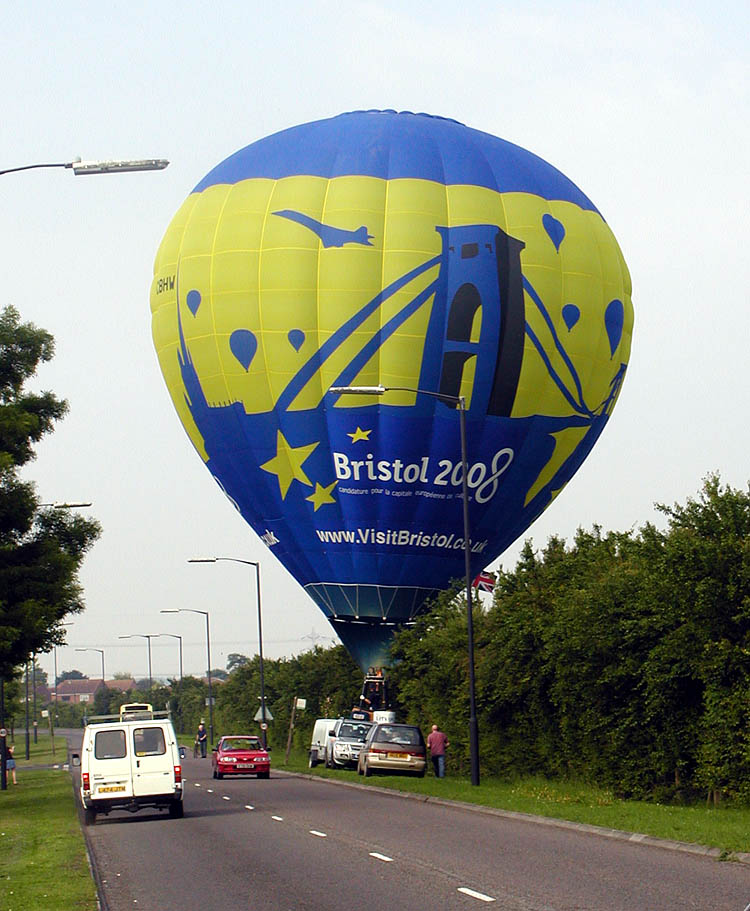
A Cameron Z105 balloon near Bristol

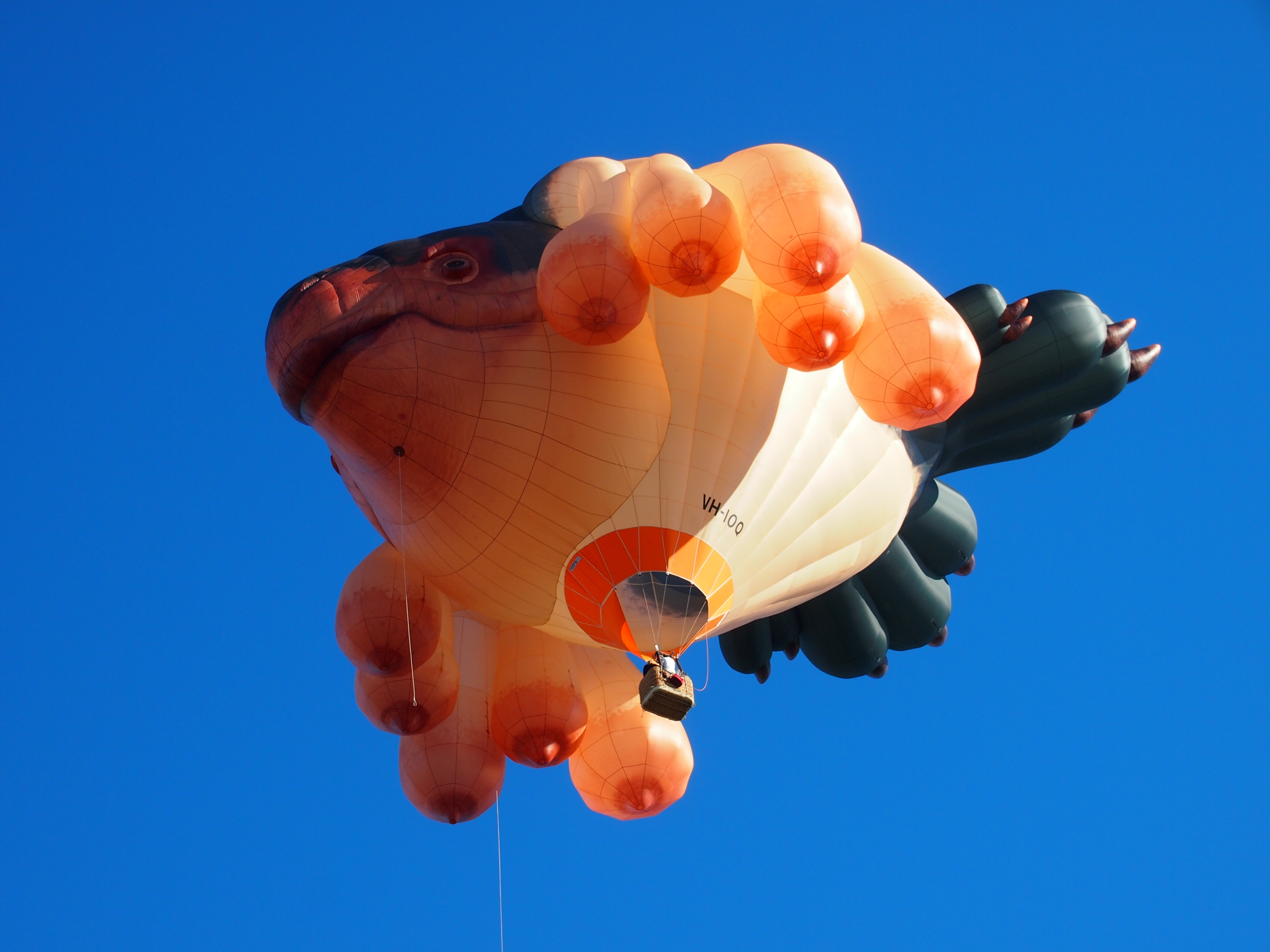
The balloon The Skywhale which was designed by the sculptor Patricia Piccinini and manufactured by Cameron Balloons during 2012 and 2013

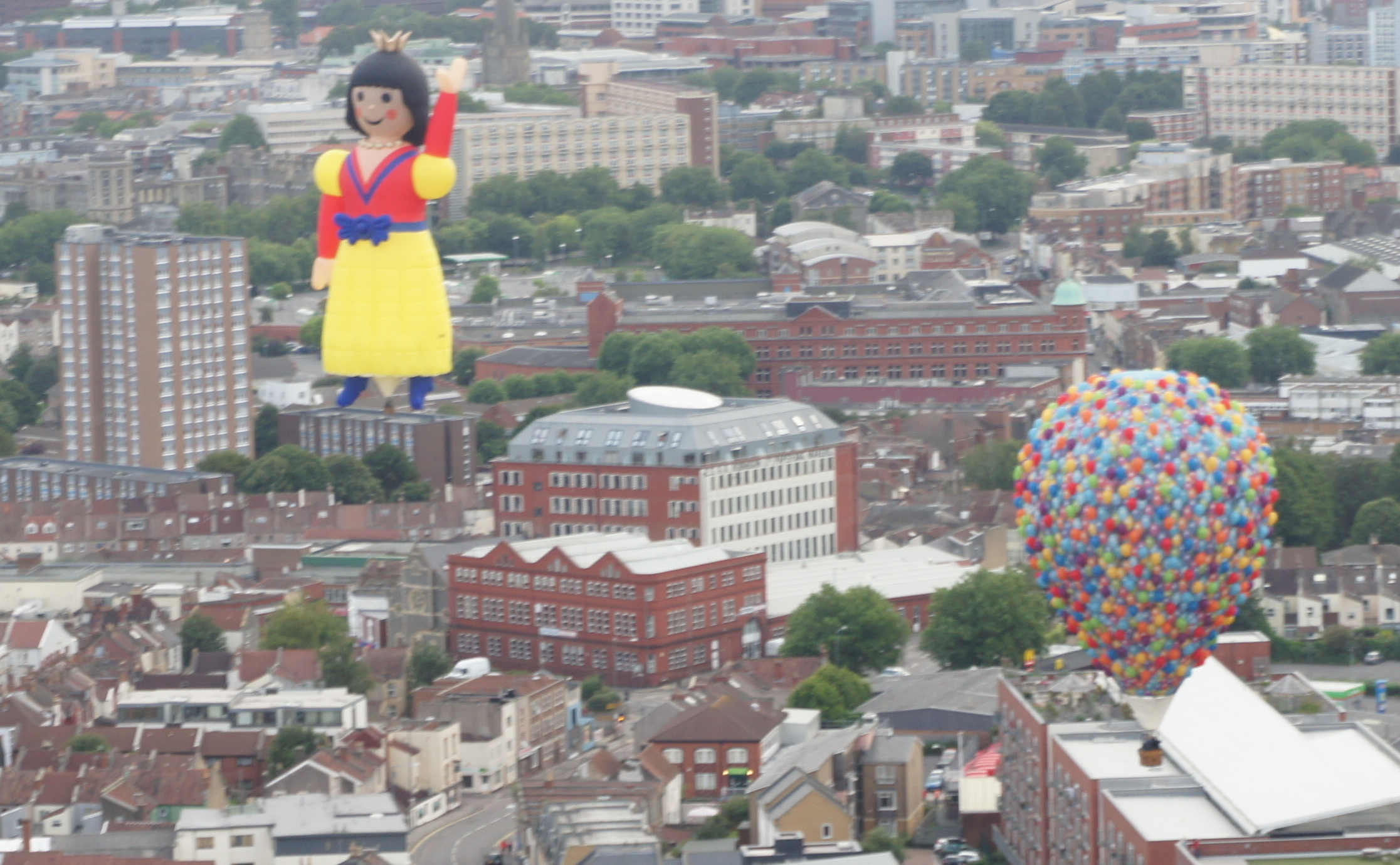
The Cameron's factory with two balloons manufactured by Cameron balloons

Cameron Balloons is a company established in 1971 in Bristol, England, by Don Cameron to manufacture hot air balloons. Cameron had previously, with others, constructed ten hot air balloons under the name Omega. Production was in the basement of his house, moving in 1972 to an old church in the city. In 1983 Cameron Balloons moved into its current premises in the former Robinsons paper bag/printing factory (built in 1887 in the Bedminster area of the city). In 1989 the company received the Queen's Award for Export.

Output has grown to around 110 balloons per year. As of December 2007, Cameron Balloons accounted for 1,073 of the 1,553 hot air balloons registered with the United Kingdom Civil Aviation Authority. Cameron Balloons is also famous for its special shapes, the first being Robertson's Golly, constructed in 1975. Most special shapes are made for commercial advertising, but some have been bought privately. Notable amongst these private buyers is the late Malcolm Forbes of Forbes magazine, who commissioned a number of special shapes, including Harley-Davidson motorbike, Sphinx, bust of Beethoven, French Chateau, Pagoda and Minaret. The company also produced the BBC Globe balloon, made popular by the BBC One 'Balloon' idents. More recently the company has manufactured special shapes for KAWS and Patricia Piccinini.

== Expansion via acquisitions ==
During the 1990s, the company strengthened its position, via a string of acquisitions. First, Cameron acquired its main British competitor Thunder & Colt Balloons. Then, it bought the smaller Sky Balloons, which had been formed by former Thunder & Colt employees after the company's sale. Finally, Cameron acquired two-thirds ownership of Lindstrand Balloons, which had been formed by Per Lindstrand after he left Thunder & Colt in the early 1990s.

== See also ==
- Cameron D-38
- Cameron Skystar
- Rozière balloon
