= Monash University Accident Research Centre =

Coordinates: 37.90922°S 145.13428°E

Monash University Accident Research Centre (MUARC)
- Established: 1987
- Mission: To prevent injury, save lives and build futures
- Focus: Injury prevention
- Location: Clayton, Melbourne, Victoria, Australia
- Website: https://www.monash.edu/muarc

The Monash University Accident Research Centre (MUARC) is a research institute in the injury prevention field. The centre is located at the Clayton Campus of Monash University in Victoria, Australia.

The centre was founded in 1987 as a joint venture between the Victorian Government and Monash University in an effort to lower the state's road toll. During its formative years, MUARC undertook significant road safety research such as an in-depth crash investigation for the Federal Office of Road Safety and an evaluation of the effectiveness of Victoria's mobile speed cameras. Its research is interdisciplinary and addresses injury prevention needs across the three main themes of Home and community safety, Workplace safety, and Transport safety.

Throughout its history, the centre has formed partnerships with key agencies across the field of injury prevention. Its Baseline Research Program is commissioned by Transport for Victoria, the TAC, VicRoads, the Department of Justice, Victoria Police, and the Department of Health and Human Services. MUARC is also a World Health Organization Collaborating Centre for Violence and Injury Prevention.

MUARC's headquarters feature advanced driving simulation facilities that are claimed to be unmatched in Australia. These facilities include a full car simulator, motorbike simulator, cycle simulator, portable car simulator and a truck simulator.

MUARC staff are drawn from the academic disciplines of biostatistics, computer science, human factors, medicine, nursing, epidemiology, statistics, engineering, industrial ergonomics, disaster resilience, psychology, public health, policy, and education. The centre serves as a postgraduate school offering a Doctor of Philosophy course. Its disaster resilience unit, the Monash University Disaster Resilience Initiative (MUDRI), also offers a master's degree.
