= Transport Accident Commission =

Government auto insurer in Victoria, Australia

Agency overview
- Formed: 1 January 1987
- Preceding agency: Motor Accidents Board
- Employees: 947 (June 2018)
- Minister responsible: Melissa Horne, Minister for Roads and Road Safety
- Key documents: Transport Accident Act 1986; Transport Accident Regulations 2017
- Website: tac.vic.gov.au
- Agency ID: PROV VA 2892

The Transport Accident Commission (TAC) is the statutory insurer of third-party personal liability (CTP insurance in other states) for road accidents in the State of Victoria, Australia. It was established under the Transport Accident Act 1986.

Its purpose is to fund treatment and support services for people injured in transport accidents. The TAC's support covers medical and non-medical expenses incurred as a result of an accident, for example income support for people whose injuries prevent them from performing normal job duties, or return to work programs, and equipment or aids, such as wheelchairs or crutches that are recommended by a healthcare professional. Funding used by the TAC to perform these functions comes from compulsory payments made by Victorian motorists when they register their vehicles each year with VicRoads.

The TAC also has a duty to help reduce accidents on Victorian roads. It is responsible for the majority of road safety advertising in the state.

== History ==
In 1973, the Parliament of Victoria passed the Motor Accidents Act, which established the Motor Accidents Board to pay compensation to people injured in motor vehicle accidents. The Act granted a form of no-fault insurance to Victorian residents in certain circumstances, but victims retained their common law right to sue other drivers for fault or negligence, and the Board was prevented from providing compensation in some situations, such as where the victim's blood alcohol content at the time of the accident was above 0.05%.

Over the following decade, the compensation scheme was heavily criticised from two main perspectives: first, that the retention of common law rights discriminated between victims who could prove fault and those who could not; and second, that the scheme was financially unviable in the long term. In 1986, the Labor government under Premier John Cain proposed legislation that would re-establish the compensation scheme and completely eliminate the right of individuals to sue for damages in motor vehicle accidents. However, due to widespread political and public opposition, a compromise solution was arranged, whereby the no-fault compensation scheme would be radically expanded, but the most seriously injured victims would retain a right to damages. This solution was enshrined in law by the Transport Accident Act 1986, which established the Transport Accident Commission and became effective on 1 January 1987.

== Public education campaigns ==
The TAC is known for its powerful road safety public education campaigns which emphasize the personal costs of dangerous driving practices (such as speeding and drunk driving) using emotive, educational and enforcement based themes.

In 1989, the increasing cost of accidents caused VicRoads and the TAC to adopt a new approach including:

- a significant boost to enforcement resources targeting speeding campaigns to sign-post change and help set the public agenda
- a sustained and community-based road safety bodies, and
- an emphasis on evaluating their effectiveness.

For its part, the TAC funds television and billboards coupled with high-impact advertising.

The TAC's most well known slogan is "If you drink, then drive, you're a bloody idiot," which was introduced in 1989. This slogan has become a catchphrase in Australia, and has even been used in other countries (including Canada and New Zealand). It was replaced in 2011 with "Only a little bit over? You bloody idiot," to reflect the danger of low-level drink-driving.

Another well known slogan is "Don't fool yourself, speed kills," which was introduced in 1994. This was modified in 2013 to reflect low-level speeding to "Wipe off 5."

Other recognised TAC slogans from the 1990s include "Belt up, or suffer the pain," "Take a break, fatigue kills," "It's in your hands, concentrate or kill," and "Country people die on country roads."

A recent safety campaign drew attention to life-saving in-car technologies, such as Electronic Stability Control and curtain airbags. The aim of this campaign was to encourage car buyers to ask for these important safety features when purchasing their next car (the TAC has set up a website to promote this). The Victorian Government has mandated this as a future design requirement.

In 2016, the TAC commissioned the lifelike figure depicting what a human would look like if the species evolved to survive car crashes known as Project Graham.

=== Video game advertising campaigns ===
On 10 March 2009, the TAC began in-game advertising in Saint's Row 2, and have their slogans featured on banners in Trackmania Nations.

In Grand Theft Auto IV, there is a homage to the "bloody idiot" slogan. If the player gets Niko drunk and makes him drive, either he or his drinking partner will say "Niko, if you drink then drive, you're a bloody idiot".

== Australian Football League partnerships ==
A typical TAC promotional slogan

The TAC has had partnerships with the Australian Football League and its teams to help road safety messages reach audiences at a grass-roots level.

Most famously, the TAC was the major sponsor of Richmond for 16 years through the "Drink, drive, bloody idiot" campaign, which saw the "Drink drive" message displayed on the team's guernseys which was terminated when a Richmond player was caught drink-driving. The TAC also sponsored Essendon from 1994 until 2000 with the "Don't fool yourself, speed kills" campaign, and Collingwood from 2002 until 2006 with the "Wipe off 5" message.

== Non-AFL sporting partnerships ==
The TAC has been the major sponsor of the quasi-national under-18s Australian Rules Football league, known as the TAC Cup, since its inception in 1992. Outside Australian Rules, the TAC has partnerships with A-League side Melbourne Victory and the Australian Formula One Grand Prix.
