= Thermal airship =

Lighter-than-air aircraft with propulsion capabilities

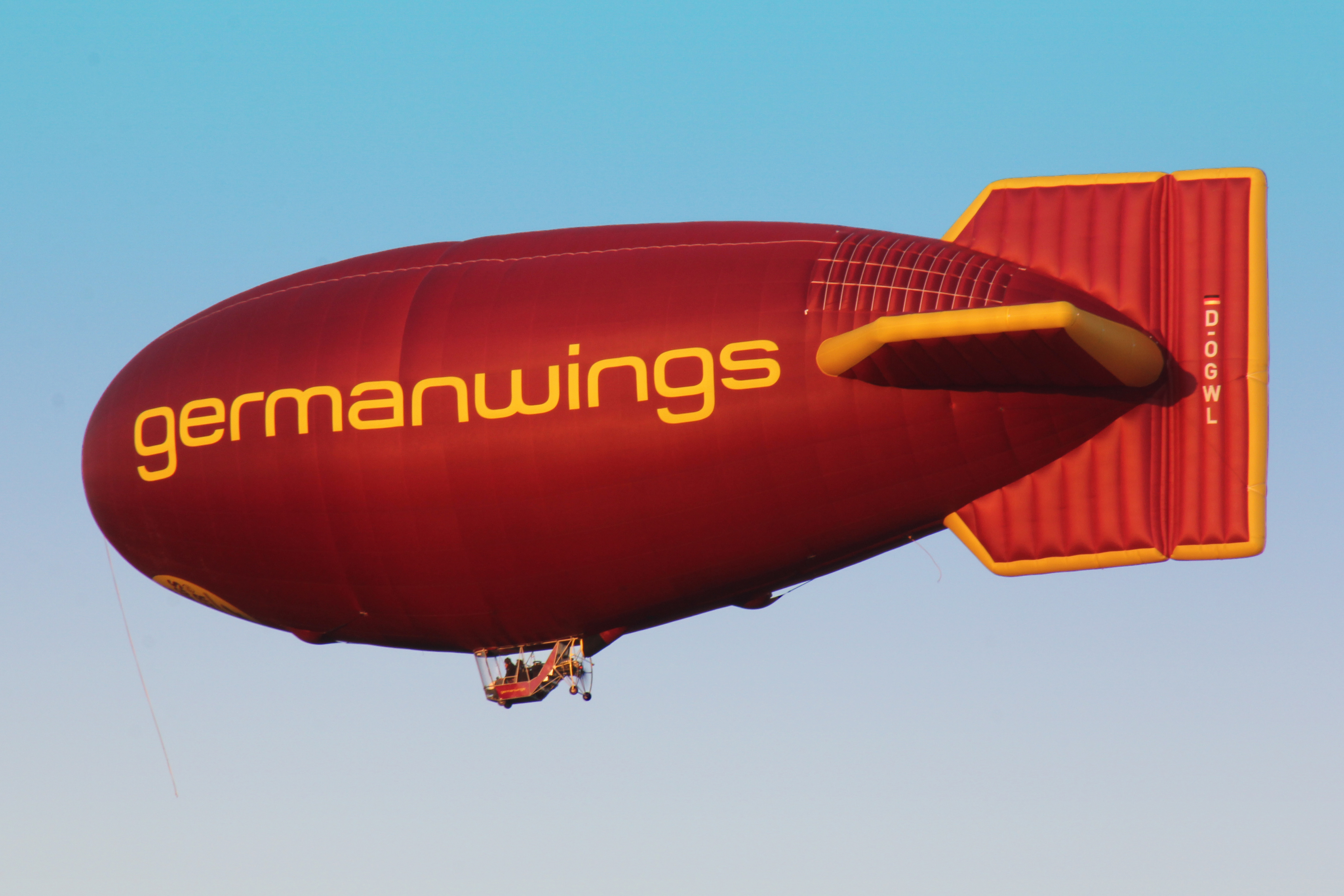
Hot air airship made by Gefa-Flug

In aeronautics and aerostats, a thermal airship is an airship that generates buoyancy by heating air in a large chamber or envelope. The lower density of the interior hot air compared to the cooler ambient air causes an upward force on the envelope. This is very similar to a hot air balloon, with the notable exception that an airship has a powered means of propulsion, whilst a hot air balloon relies on winds for navigation. An airship that uses steam would also qualify as a thermal airship.

Other types of airships use a gas that is lighter than air at ambient temperature, such as helium, as a lifting gas.

Some airship designs that use a lighter-than-air lifting gas heat a portion of the gas, which is usually maintained in enclosed cells to gain additional lift. Heating the lifting gas causes expansion of the gas in order to further lower the density of the lifting gas, which results in greater lift.

== Advantages and disadvantages ==
Thermal airships have the advantage of being much less expensive than helium-based airships. They are also routinely deflated after each flight and can be readily packed for storage and/or transport, making them blimps rather than rigid airships.

Hot air craft produce much less uplift per unit volume than helium- or hydrogen-filled craft (about 30% depending on air conditions). This necessitates lighter construction, with fewer controls and hence more difficulty in maneuvering. This leads to:

- lower airspeeds
- difficulty in handling on the ground if the ground wind is above 5 knots
- difficulty in steering, particularly at low air speeds
- lack of elevator (pitch) control, causing the airship to pitch up or down in response to changes in the throttle setting (a motion called 'porpoising')

In recent years, the steering of these ships has improved somewhat. The most successful approach has been to use higher pressure in the tail fin structures than in the rest of the envelope, or to use an internal structure (see below).

== History ==
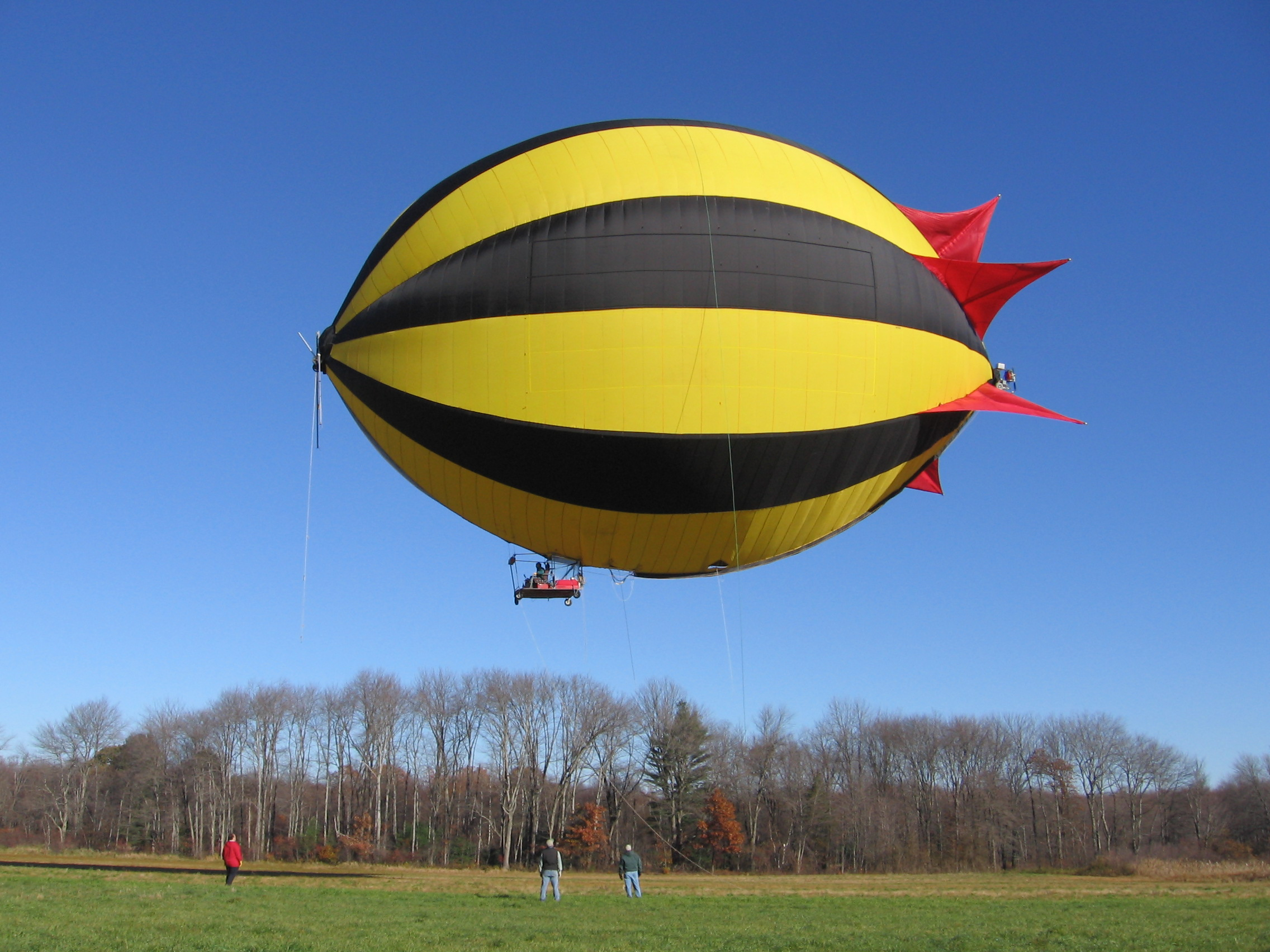
Skyacht Personal Blimp – another type of thermal airship

The first public flight of a hot air airship was made by Don Cameron (UK) in a Cameron D-96 at the Icicle Meet in January 1973. The aircraft took 3 years to develop.

== Envelope structures ==
Most thermal airships are non-rigid. Some are pressurized. In some cases, the pressurized air is taken from a duct located behind the propeller. In other cases, the pressurized air comes from a separate fan.

In 2006, a new type of envelope employing a tensile membrane structure was developed by Skyacht Aircraft. This design uses an unpressurized envelope and an internal structure that uses ribs made of aluminium to keep the envelope in shape. When not in use, the structure folds up in a manner similar to an umbrella. The structure also permits the mounting of a steerable engine/propeller on the tail of the aircraft. The tail-mounted propeller provides for vectored thrust steering, allowing tight turns.

== Operation ==
Like hot air balloons, thermal airships are first inflated partially with cold (ambient temperature) air. Once the envelopes are sufficiently full, a propane burner is ignited and the inflation is completed using heated air.

== See also ==
- Zeppelin
