= List of balloon uses =

This is a list of uses of balloons.

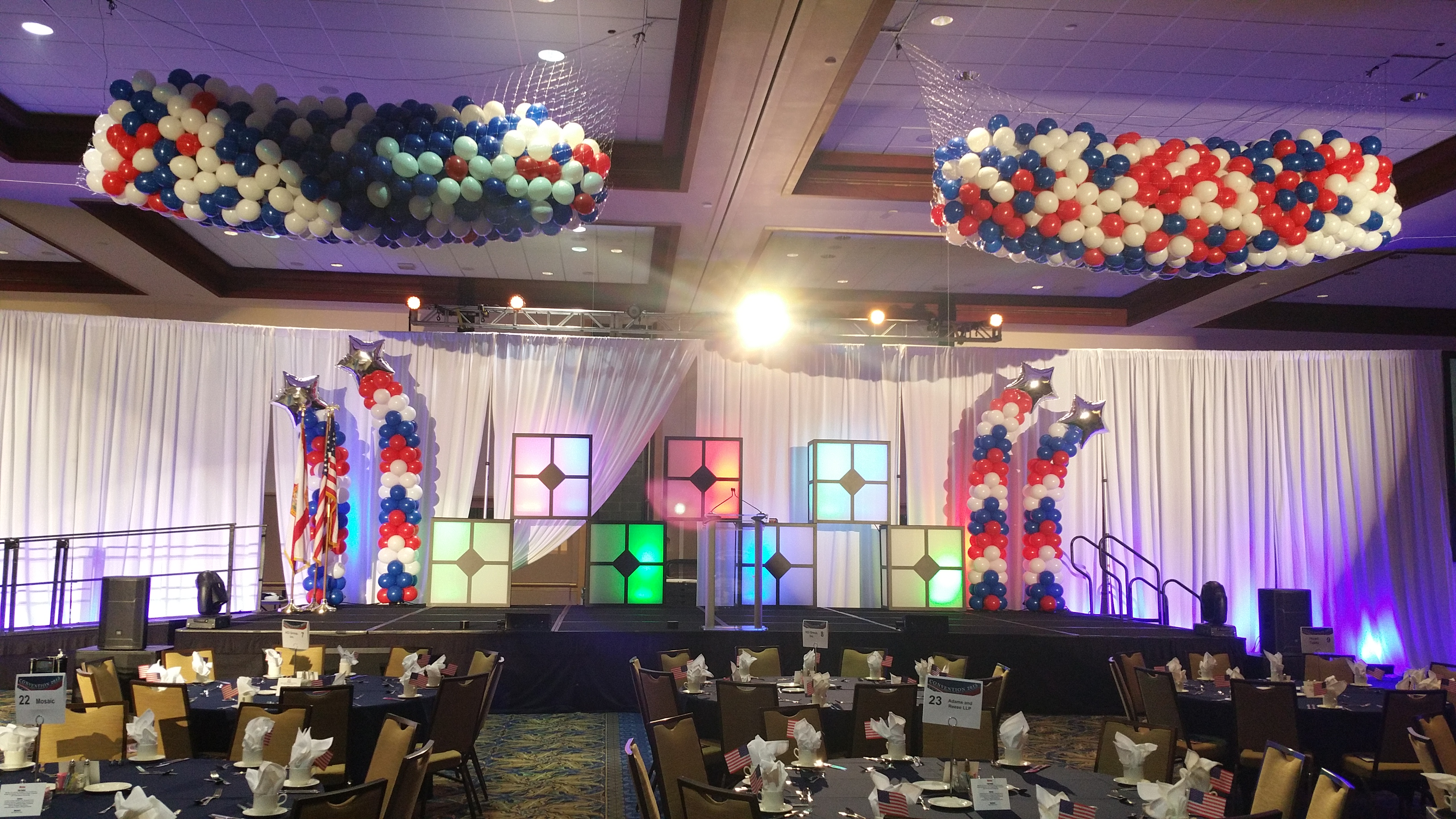
Balloon Drop

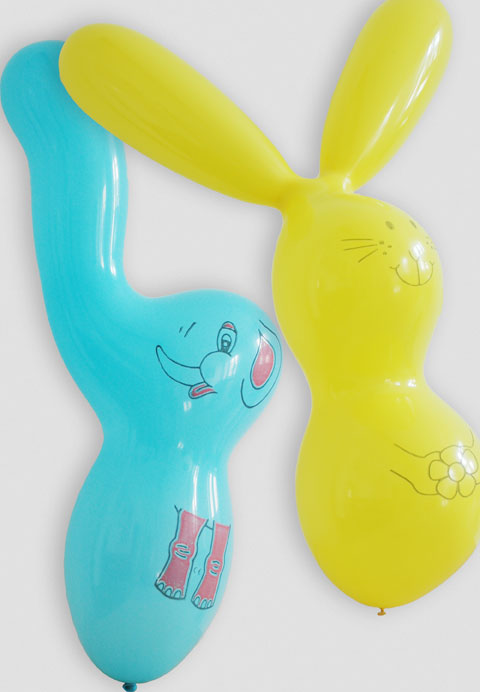
Toy balloons

- tiny
  - balloon catheter
  - balloon tamponade
  - Graphene balloons
- small (volume of a few litres)
  - gas balloon
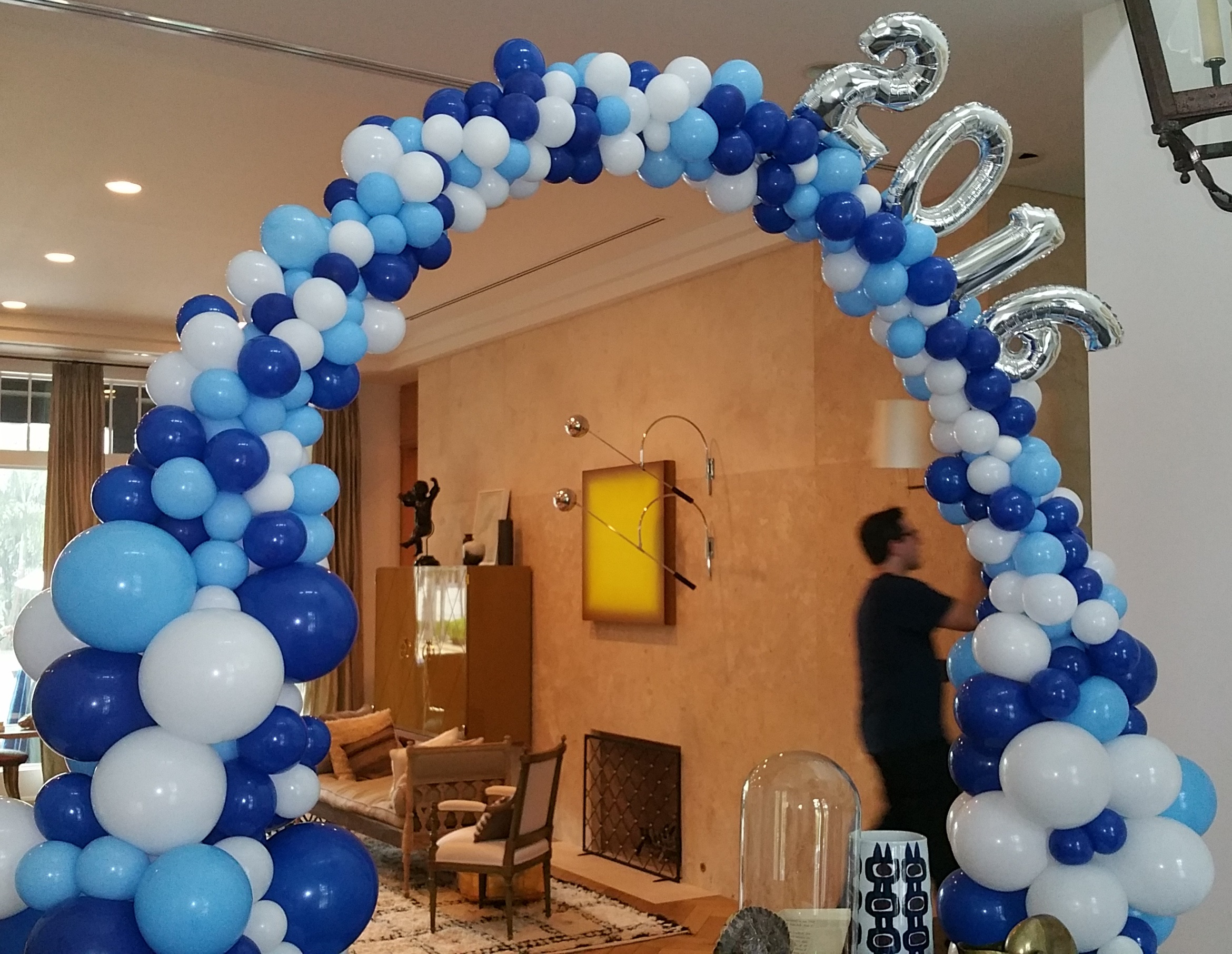
  - Balloons as Decorations
    Balloon Drop
  - cluster ballooning
  - Talking balloon
  - toy balloon
  - water balloon
  - papier-mâché
  - balloon modelling
  - decoration
  - solar balloon
  - balloon mail as part of a balloon flight competition or to spread information
  - balloon helicopter
  - balloon rocket, demonstration of rocket propulsion
  - ceiling balloon
  - decoys accompanying ICBMs in midcourse, see also countermeasure
  - A vessel for storing nitrous oxide prior to inhalation for use as a recreational drug
- medium (volume of tens to thousands of litres)
  - free flying
    - high-altitude balloon
    - hopper balloon
    - fire balloon for the transport of bombs (in World War II, FUGO-Balloon)
    - transport of propaganda (in World War II and in the Cold War)
    - ceiling balloon
    - weather balloon used with a radiosonde
  - fixed
    - for carrying advertising signs
    - to carry a radio antenna
    - toy balloon
    - research balloon
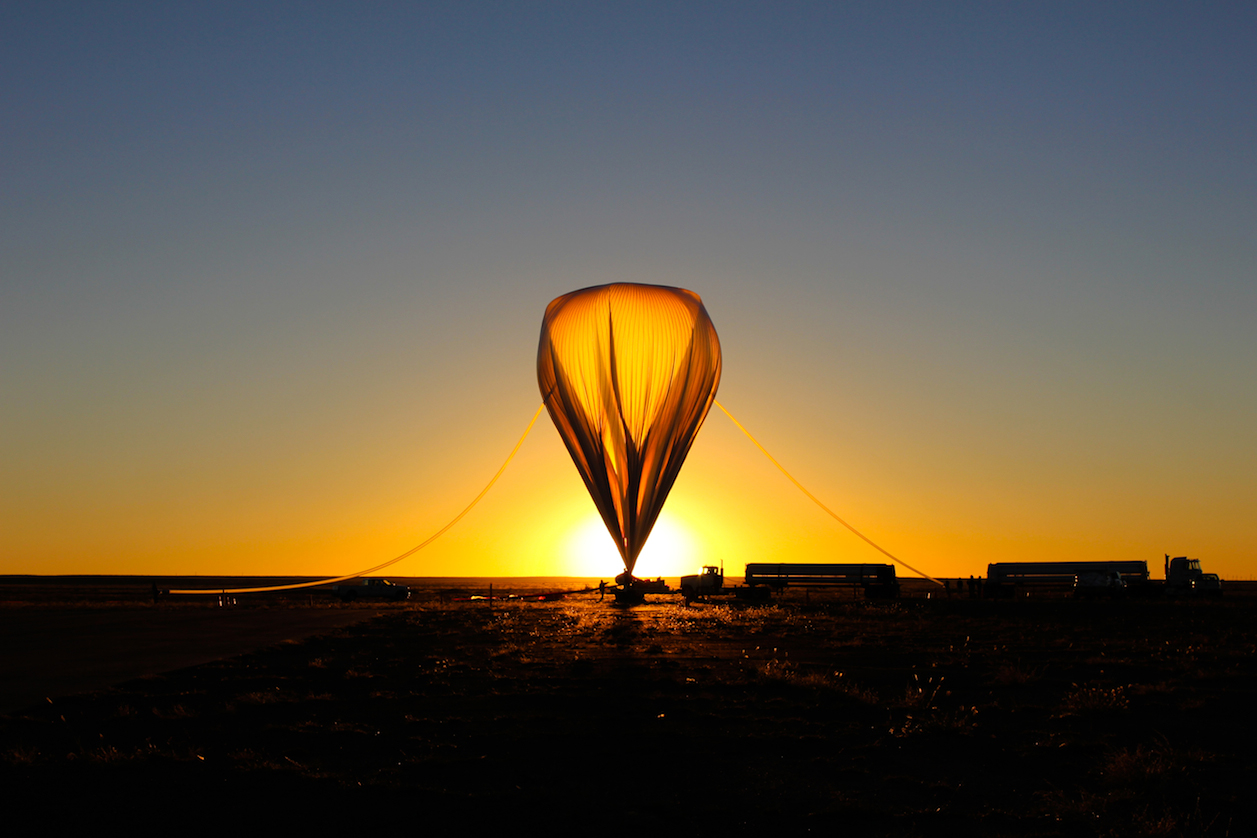
      Research balloon
    - Skyhook balloon
    - superpressure balloon
  - other
    - balloon tires, for vehicles that require low ground pressures
- large (volume up to 12,000,000 litres)
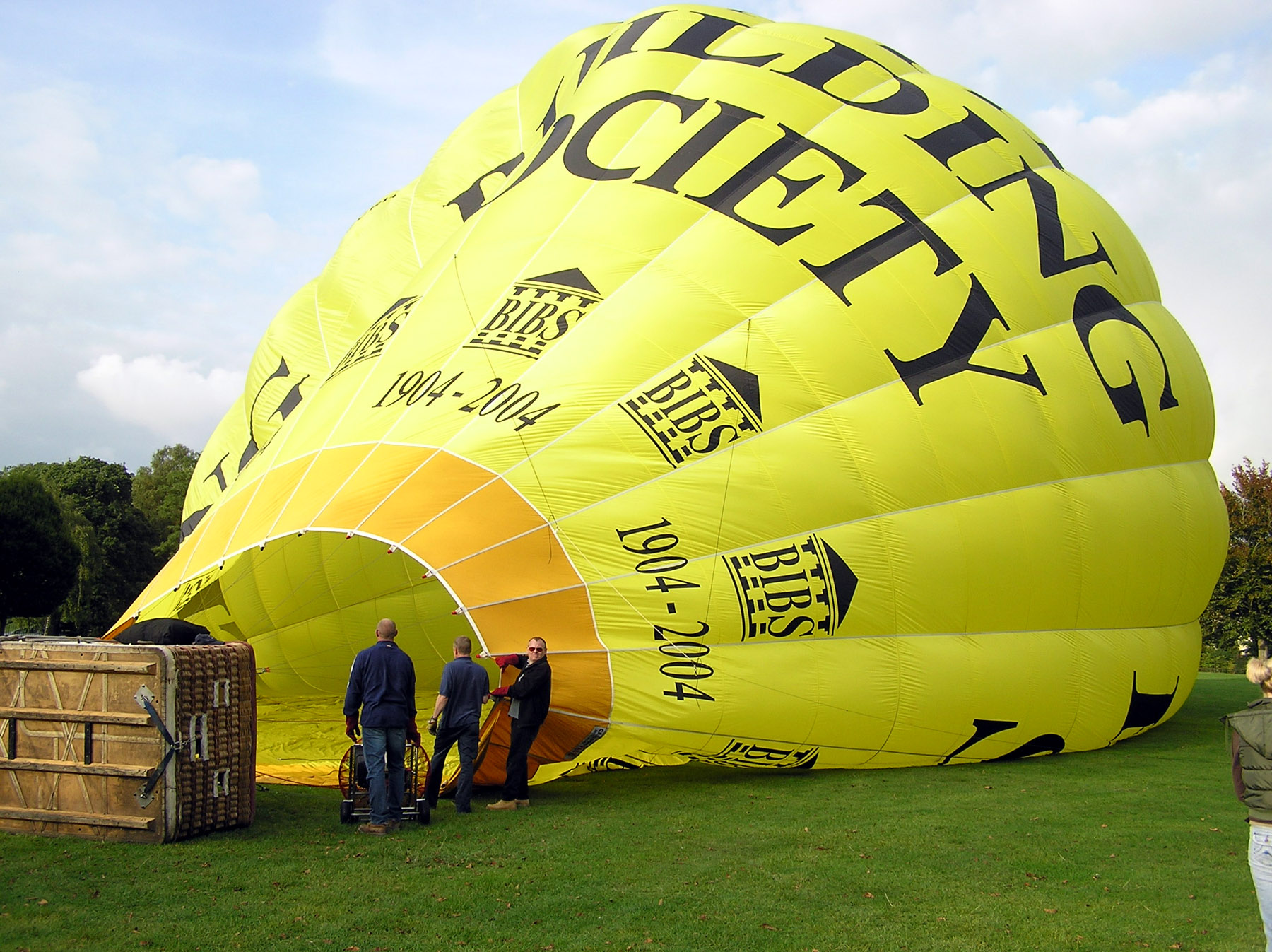
  A hot air balloon is inflated at Royal Victoria Park, Bath, England
  - free flying
    - balloon (aircraft)
      - lifting people, or daring prison escapes, usually with a hot air balloon, Rozière balloon or a gas balloon
    - airship, a steerable balloon
    - hybrid airship, which combines characteristics of heavier-than-air (HTA) technology, fixed-wing aircraft or helicopter, and lighter-than-air (LTA), aerostat technology.
    - research balloon with instrumentation, also to carry telescopes
    - rockoon, a carrier for rockets.
    - balloon satellite for space research.
    - espionage balloon for military reconnaissance
    - hopper balloon
  - fixed
    - as manned observation post (before World War II)
    - barrage balloon
    - observation balloon for military reconnaissance
    - positioning atomic bombs for bomb tests in the atmosphere
    - moored balloon
