= Hot air ballooning =

Activity of flying hot air balloons

Hot air ballooning is the recreational and competitive adventure sport of flying hot air balloons. Attractive aspects of ballooning include the exceptional quiet (except when the propane burners are firing), the lack of a feeling of movement, and the bird's-eye view. Since the balloon moves with the direction of the winds, the passengers feel absolutely no wind, except for brief periods during the flight when the balloon climbs or descends into air currents of different direction or speed. Hot air ballooning has been recognized by Fédération Aéronautique Internationale (FAI) as the safest air sport in aviation, and fatalities in hot air balloon accidents are rare, according to statistics from the National Transportation Safety Board (NTSB).

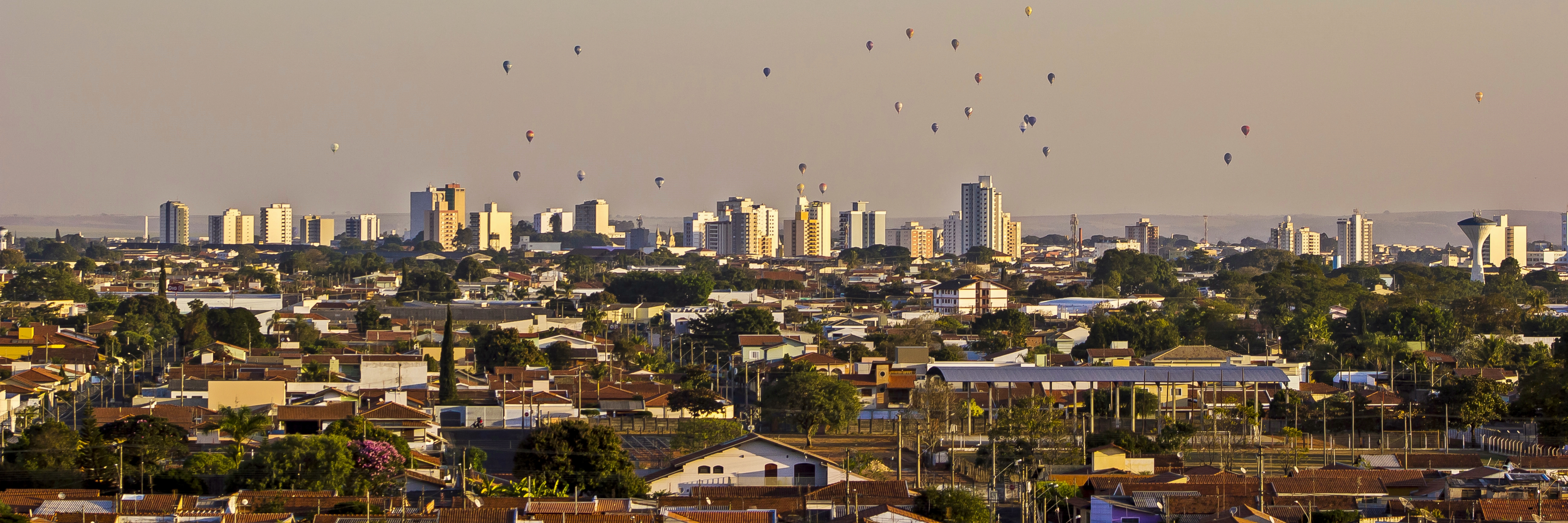
Rio Claro, São Paulo, Brazil, during the 21st World Hot Air Balloon Championship

== History ==
=== First manned flight ===
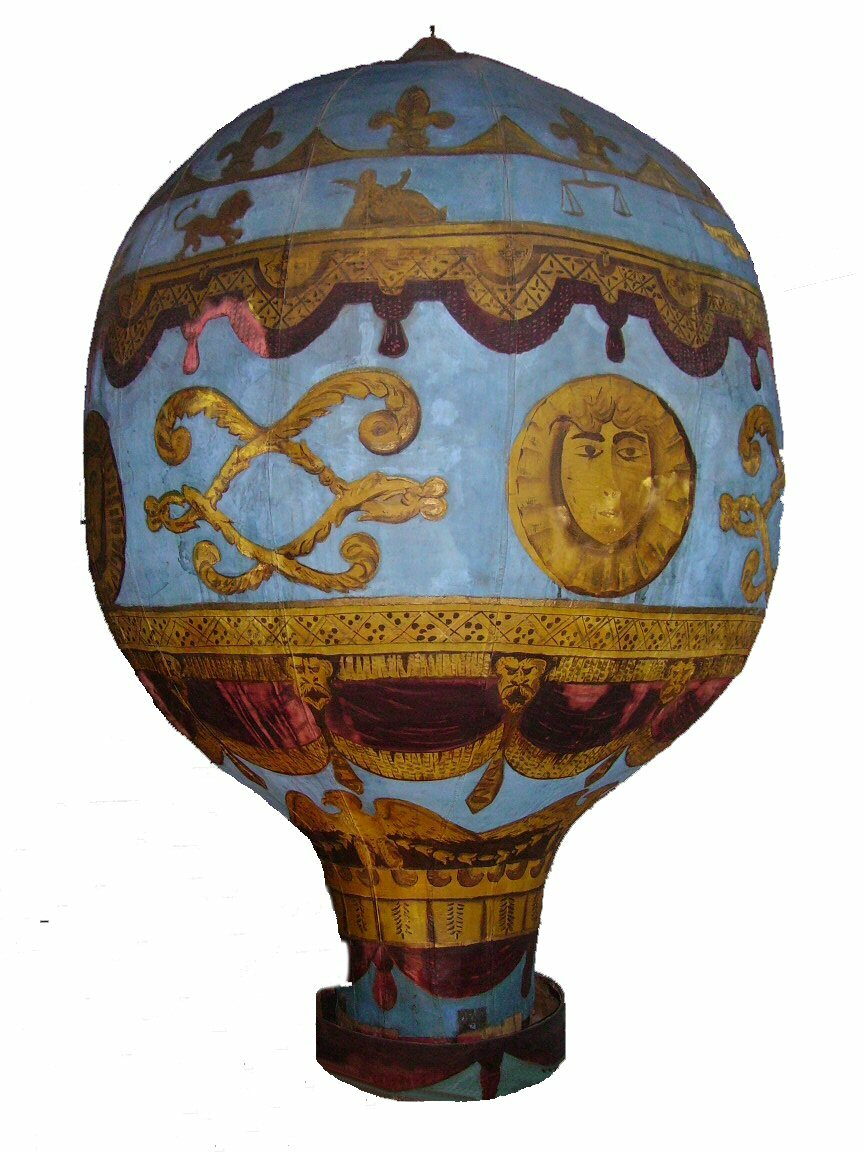
A model of the Montgolfier brothers balloon at the London Science Museum

The first clearly recorded instance of a balloon carrying passengers used hot air to generate buoyancy and was built by the brothers Joseph-Michel and Jacques-Etienne Montgolfier in Annonay, France. After experimenting with unmanned balloons and flights with animals, the first tethered balloon flight with humans on board took place on October 19, 1783, with the scientist Jean-François Pilâtre de Rozier, the manufacture manager, Jean-Baptiste Réveillon and Giroud de Villette, at the Folie Titon in Paris. The first free flight with human passengers was on November 21, 1783. King Louis XVI had originally decreed that condemned criminals would be the first pilots, but de Rozier, along with Marquis Francois d'Arlandes, successfully petitioned for the honor.

=== Modern revival ===
Modern hot air ballooning was born in 1960, when Ed Yost launched a balloon with a new nylon envelope and propane burner system of his own invention. Yost's first balloon was basketless, with nothing but a seat for him to ride on, but in a few years he and other balloon enthusiasts would develop balloons much like the ones used today.

Today, hot air balloons are used primarily for recreation. According to the FAA's General Aviation Survey data, in 2012, there were about 2,300 personally owned and flown balloons, and about 495 commercial sightseeing ride operators in the United States. Balloon rides are available in many locations around the world and are especially popular in tourist areas. At balloon festivals many balloons will fly at once, with other entertainment available.

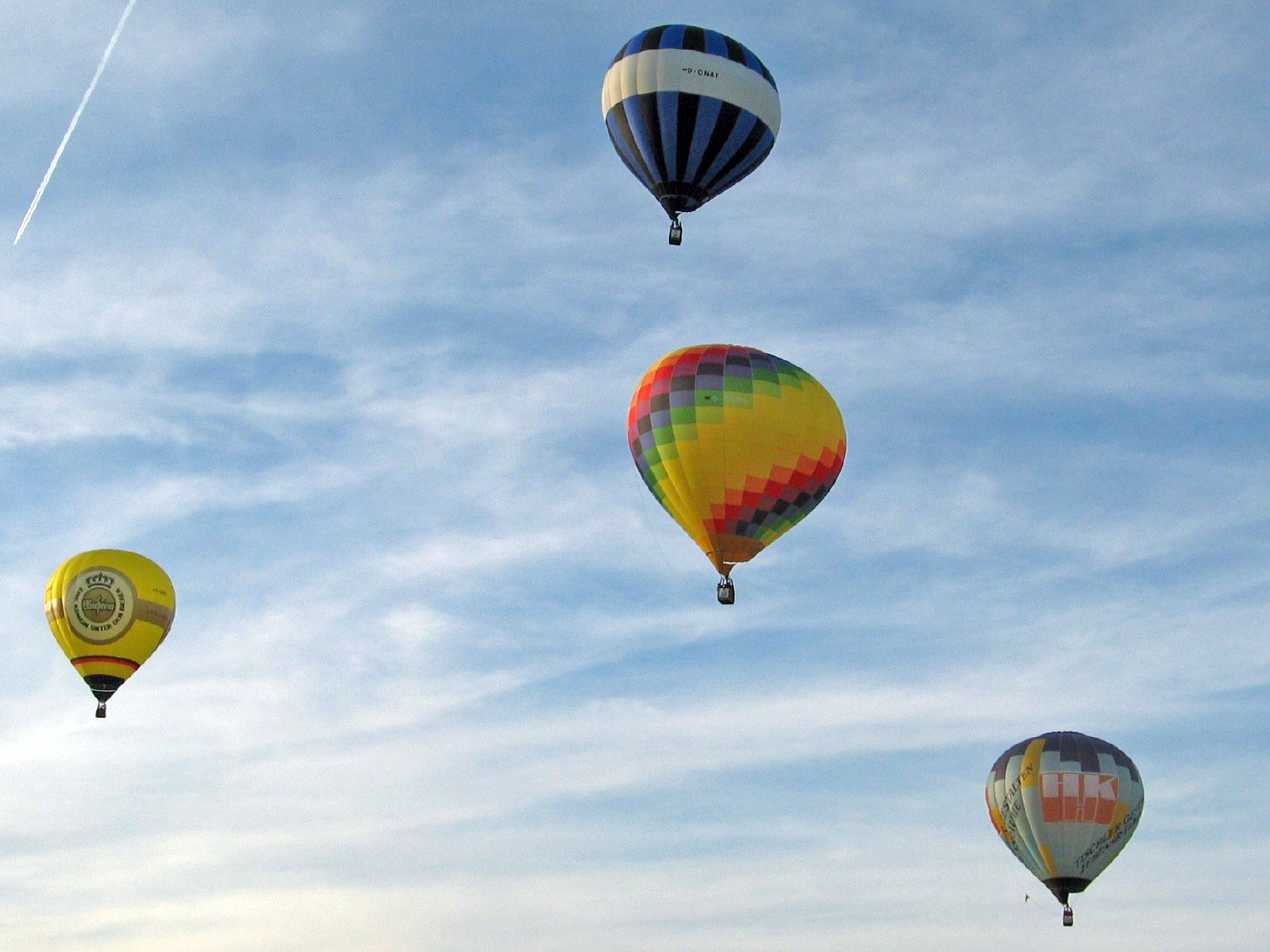
Hot air balloons in flight

Hot air balloons are able to fly to extremely high altitudes. On November 26, 2005, Vijaypat Singhania set the world altitude record for highest hot air balloon flight, reaching 21,290 meters (69,850 feet). He took off from downtown Mumbai, India and landed 240 km (150 mi) south in Panchale. The previous record of 19,811 meters (64,997 feet) had been set by Per Lindstrand on June 6, 1988, in Plano, Texas. However, as with all unpressurised aircraft, oxygen is needed for all crew and passengers on any balloon flight that reaches and exceeds an altitude of 3,810 meters (12,500 feet).

On January 15, 1991, a balloon called the Pacific Flyer carrying Per Lindstrand (born in Sweden, but resident in the UK) and Richard Branson of the UK flew from Japan to Northern Canada, completing 7,671.91 km. With a volume of 74,000 m^{3} (2,600,000 ft^{3}), the balloon envelope was the largest ever built for a hot air craft. Designed to fly in the trans-oceanic jetstreams the Pacific Flyer recorded the highest ground speed for a manned balloon of 245 mph (394 km/h).

The distance record was broken on March 21, 1999, when the Breitling Orbiter 3 carrying Bertrand Piccard and Brian Jones touched down in Egypt, having circumnavigated the globe and set records for duration (19 days, 21 hours and 55 minutes) and distance (46,759 km).

== Flight techniques ==
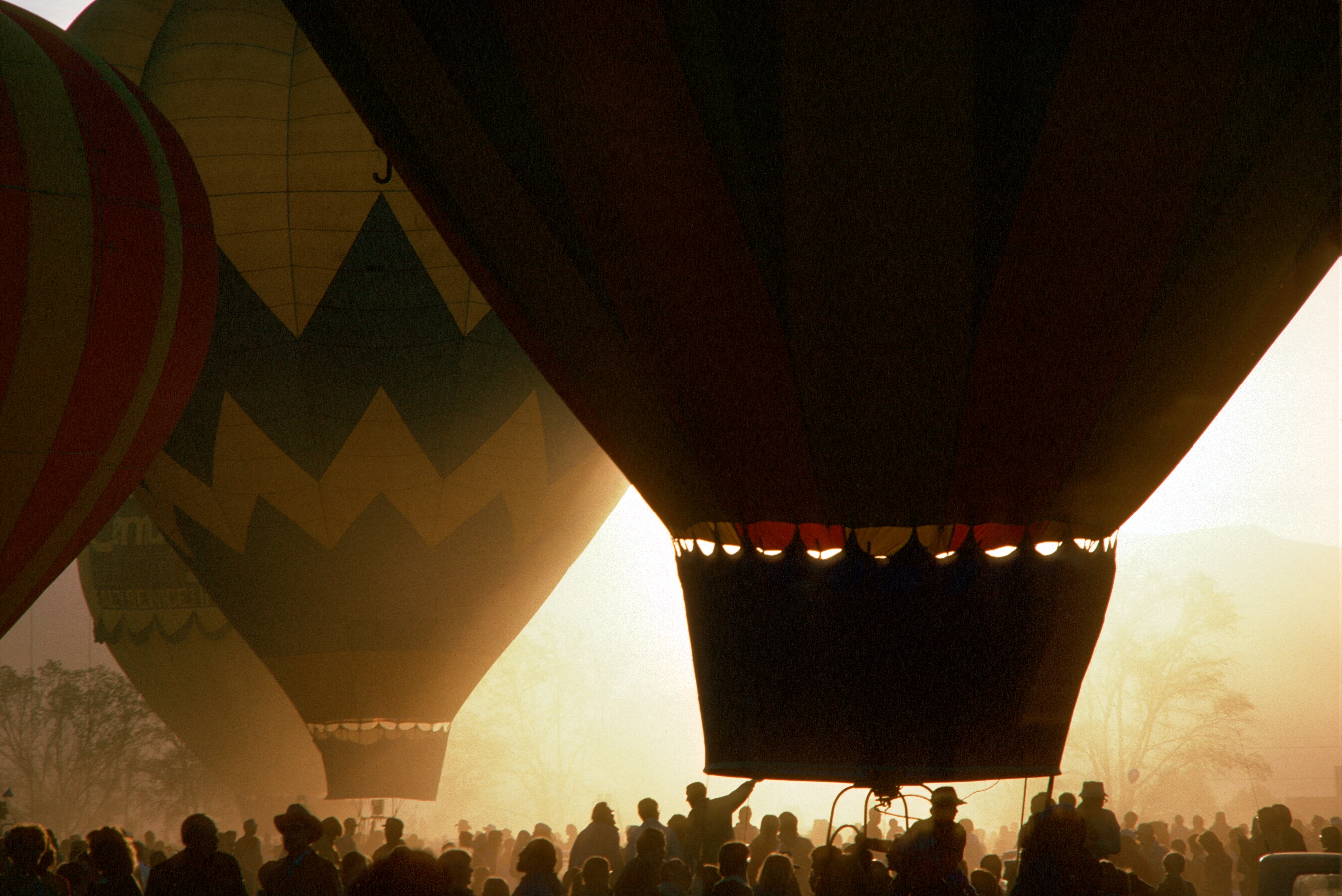
Early morning departures

Most hot air balloon launches are made during the cooler hours of the day, at dawn or two to three hours before sunset. At these times of day, the winds are typically light making for easier launch and landing of the balloon. Flying at these times also avoids thermals, which are vertical air currents caused by ground heating that make it more difficult to control the balloon. In the extreme, the downdrafts associated with strong thermals can exceed the ability of a balloon to climb and can thus force a balloon into the ground.

=== Sequence ===
==== Preflight preparation ====
Before a safe hot air balloon flight can begin, the pilot must check the weather and select a suitable take-off point. The current and forecast weather must have sufficient visibility for the pilot to see and avoid obstructions (little or no fog or low clouds) and sufficiently slow winds to allow take off and landing (less than 5 or 10 mph depending on skill and experience of pilot, passengers, and ground crew).

The take-off point must be large enough to lay out and inflate the envelope and clear of obstructions such as power lines and poles, trees, and buildings to allow lift-off under the predicted wind conditions. Finally, the take-off point must be situated such that the predicted winds will move the balloon in the direction of suitable landing sites. Taking off from a location that is directly up wind of a hazard, such as a large body of water, a large metropolitan area, or a large uninterrupted forest, without sufficient fuel to pass over the hazard is not safe.

==== Set up ====
Hot air balloon, set up and launch, Stockholm 1988.

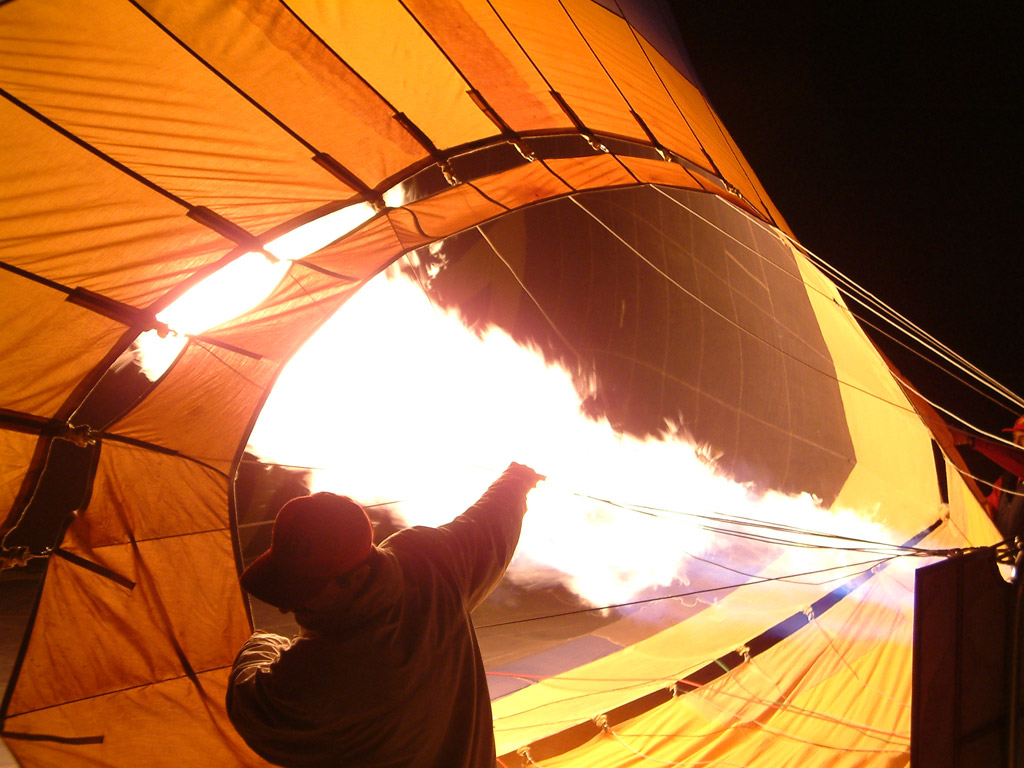
Hot air balloon being inflated by its propane burners prior to a dawn launch.

The next step in a hot air balloon flight is unpacking the balloon from its carrying bag, laying it out on the ground, and connecting it to the basket and burner. A fan, often gasoline-powered, is used to blow cold (outside) air into the envelope. The cold air partially inflates the balloon to establish its basic shape before the burner flame is aimed into the mouth heating the air inside. A crew member stationed opposite the mouth, holds a rope (crown line) tied to the apex (crown) of the envelope. Some balloons, AX7 and larger, may have two (or more) crown lines. The "crown-man" role is twofold: one is to prevent the envelope from excessive sway, and two is to prevent the envelope from rising before it is sufficiently buoyant. Once the balloon is upright, pilot and passengers climb into the basket. When the pilot is ready for launch, more heat is directed into the envelope and the balloon lifts off.

The crew then pack up inflation equipment and follow the balloon with the retrieve vehicle (also called a chase vehicle).

==== Flight ====
During the flight, the pilot's only ability to steer the balloon is the ability to climb or descend into winds going different directions. Thus, it is important for the pilot to determine what direction the wind is blowing at altitudes other than the balloon's altitude. To do this, the pilot uses a variety of techniques. For example, to determine wind directions beneath the balloon a pilot might simply spit or release a squirt of shaving cream and watch this indicator as it falls to determine where possible turns are (and their speed). Pilots are also looking for other visual clues such as flags on flagpoles, smoke coming from chimneys, etc. To determine wind directions above the balloon, the pilot will obtain a weather forecast prior to the flight which includes upper-level wind forecasts. The pilot will also send up a helium pilot balloon, known as a met-balloon in the UK and pibal in the US, prior to launch to get information about what the wind is actually doing. Another way to determine actual wind directions is to watch other hot air balloons, which are the equivalent of a large met-balloon.

===== Control =====
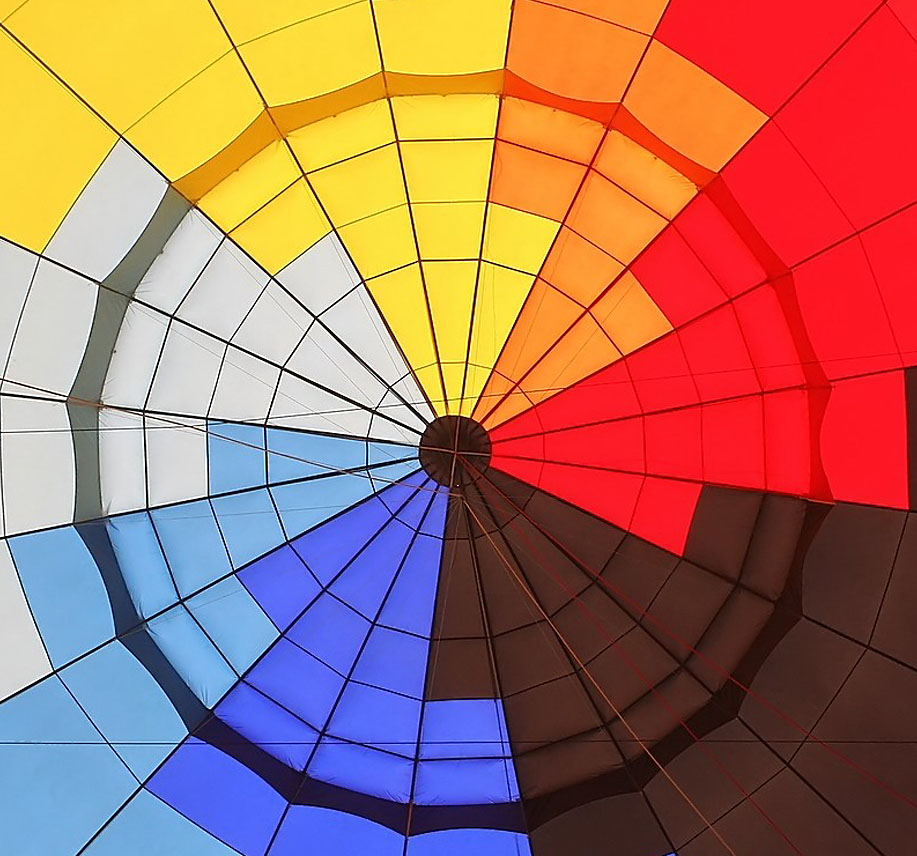
The inside of a hot air balloon's envelope, seen from the gondola.

The direction of flight depends on the wind, but the altitude of the balloon can be controlled by changing the temperature of the air inside the envelope. The pilot may open one or more burner blast valves to increase the temperature inside the envelope, thereby increasing lift, and thus ascend or slow or stop a descent. The pilot may also open a vent, if the envelope is so equipped, to let hot air escape, decreasing the temperature inside the envelope, thereby decreasing lift, and thus descend or slow or stop an ascent. Unless the pilot intervenes, the air inside the envelope will slowly cool, by seepage or by contact with cooler outside air, and slowly provide less lift.

===== Delayed response =====
One of the tricks involved in flying a balloon is learning to deal with the delayed response. To slow or stop a descent requires the pilot to open a burner blast valve. This sends hot combustion exhaust through the mouth into the envelope where it expands and forces some cooler air out of the mouth. This lightens the total weight of the system and increases its buoyancy, but not immediately. From the time that the burner is lit until the balloon slows or stops its descent can take 30 seconds or more, depending on its rate of descent, how cold it has become, and how powerful the burner. This delay requires a great deal of anticipation on the part of the pilot.

===== Steerage =====
The ability to change direction with altitude is called steerage. In the ideal case, in the northern hemisphere, wind direction turns to the right with an increase in altitude. This is due to the Coriolis effect. Winds spiral clockwise, when seen from above, out of a high pressure system and counter clockwise into a low pressure system. However, air travelling close to the ground will tend to move in more of a straight line from high to low pressure due to drag with the ground. Thus, a pilot may hope to find a turn to the left during the descent to landing. In the southern hemisphere, the direction of the spirals is reversed. In reality, interaction with an uneven terrain may lessen or eliminate this phenomenon.

===== Level flight =====
A Balloon Works Firefly 7 balloon in level flight.

The burner is designed to create enough heat to warm up the balloon quickly. It is most efficient only when wide open. There is no good way to maintain the exact temperature required to maintain equilibrium.

Add to that the fact that when a hot air balloon is not actively being heated, it is cooling off. This means that it is in perfect equilibrium only momentarily. The rest of the time it is either too warm or too cool and so either climbing or descending.

These two facts together mean that under most conditions level flight is anything but. The goal of the pilot is to light the burner at the right interval and for the right duration (a few seconds) to keep the balloon slowly drifting up and down about the desired altitude.

An exception is made when flying close to the ground, as in an approach to a landing. Then the burner may be lit for very short bursts at a much higher frequency, thus sacrificing efficiency for accuracy.

==== Chase ====
A typical chase vehicle with room for the equipment, chase crew, pilot, and all passengers.

While it is certainly possible to enjoy the sport of hot air ballooning without a chase vehicle, returning from the landing site by foot, bicycle, or hitch hiking, many balloonists opt to be followed by their ground crew in some sort of chase vehicle. Crew at the landing site can aid with the landing itself, by catching a drop line and guiding the balloon into a tight space; with extracting the balloon system from a remote location, such as deep in a farmer's field; and with packing up all the equipment.

Sometimes, a chase vehicle may be equipped with a trailer, which can provide more room at the cost of being more difficult to maneuver. A pickup truck or van by itself can be more maneuverable but at the cost of squeezing all the equipment, crew, pilot, and passengers into a single vehicle. Many chase vehicles are fitted with a cargo liftgate to aid in loading heavy equipment into the cargo space (the envelope itself can weigh 250 lbs or more).

Communication between the balloon and chase vehicle can be accomplished by two-way radio, or even shouting, when they are close enough together. The use of cell phones for this purpose, while the balloon is flying, may violate local telecommunication laws and should therefore be avoided except in an emergency situation.

==== Landing ====
Holding the crown line while the balloon deflates after landing.

Most pilots try to perform as smooth a landing as possible. This becomes difficult if the air at ground level is moving at more than 5 mph (2.2 m/s) or so. If the balloon is moving at this speed or more when it contacts the ground, the basket (which usually does not have wheels of any kind on the bottom) may drag for a bit or even tip over. Even the presence of ground crew may not help much. The combined weight (for an average passenger-carrying system as calculated above) can easily exceed the weight of a large automobile. (It is best not to be on the downwind side of a landing balloon to avoid being pinned between it and a hard place.) Pilots can improve the situation by landing in a spot protected from the wind, such as behind a line of trees or in a small valley.

Once the balloon has landed, the envelope is deflated and detached from the basket. The envelope is then packed into its carrying bag. The burner and the basket may be separated and all components are packed into the retrieve vehicle.

=== Competition ===
In competition, the pilots need to be able to read different wind directions at different altitudes. Balloon competitions are often called "races" but they are most often a test of accuracy, not speed. For most competitive balloon flights, the goal is to fly as close as possible to one or more exact points called "targets". Once a pilot has directed the balloon as close as possible to a target, a weighted marker with an identifying number written on it is dropped. The distance between a pilot's marker and that target determines his or her score. During some competitive flights, pilots will be required to fly to 5 or more targets before landing. To assist with navigation, topographic maps and GPS units are used. Another common form of competition is the "Hare and Hound" race. The Hare balloon takes off a set amount of time before the Hound balloons and typically flies with multiple altitude changes to make it more difficult for the chasing balloons to match its flight path. After a set amount of flight time, the Hare will land and typically lay out a target cross for the Hounds to drop their weighted markers near. As above, the distance between a pilot's marker and the target determines his or her score.

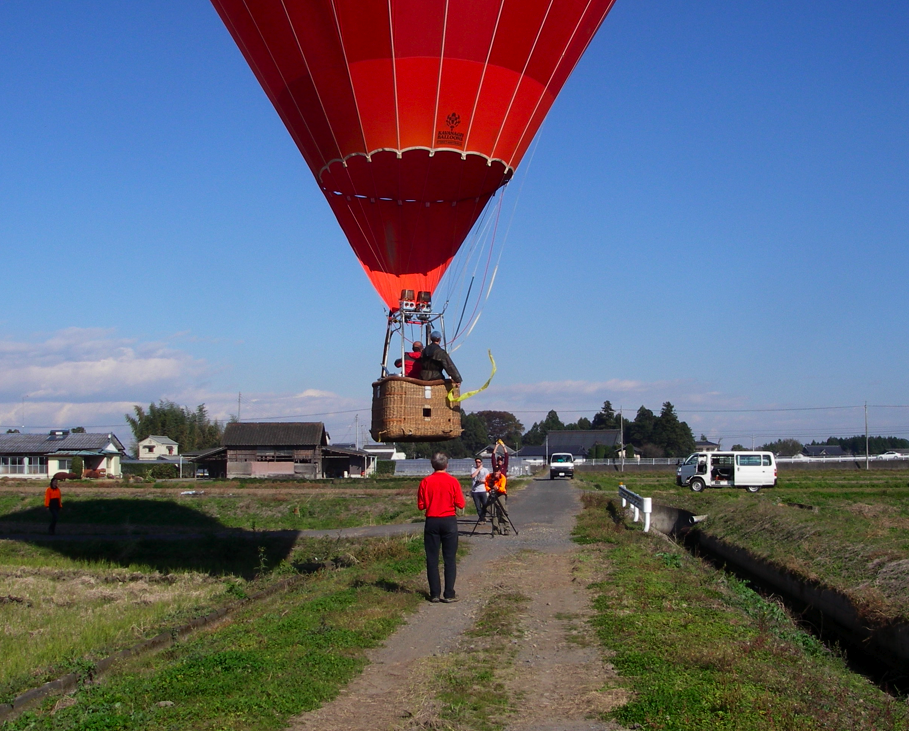
A balloonist prepares to drop a marker on a competition target, in this case the centre of a road intersection.

Some experienced pilots are able to take a flight in one direction then rise to a different altitude to catch wind in a returning direction. With experience, luck, and the right conditions, some pilots are able to control a precision landing at the destination. On rare occasions, they may be able to return to the launch site at the end of the flight. This is sometimes called a box effect, when winds at altitude flow in the opposite direction of surface winds.

=== Hazards ===
The dangers of the sport include excessive (vertical or horizontal) speed during landing, mid-air collisions that may collapse the balloon, and colliding with high voltage power lines. It is the last of these, contact with power lines, that poses the greatest danger. One of the most common causes of serious ballooning accidents in the US is power line strikes. One reason for the high frequency of such incidents is the fact that pilots often attempt to land their balloons on or near roads in order to reduce the amount of off-road driving necessary to recover the balloon. However, in most rural areas where balloons fly, roads usually have power lines running along with them.

Of the 11 accidents involving fatalities recorded by the NTSB between 1997 and 2007, 4 involved contact with power lines, 3 involved falling after hanging onto the outside of a rising balloon, 3 involved striking an object on landing (boulder, wall, or tree), and 1 involved an equipment failure (an eyebolt).

=== Winter flight ===
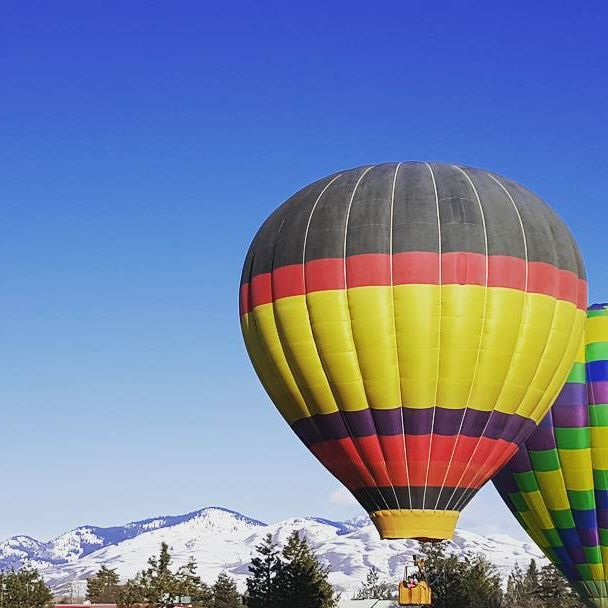
Hot air balloon in the mountains near Seattle

The ability to fly hot air balloons in the winter is limited mostly by the ability of the participants to withstand the cold. The balloons themselves fly well in cold air. Because the temperature difference between inside and outside the balloon, not the absolute inside temperature, determines the lift it develops, a much lower internal temperature is sufficient to fly in cold weather.

However, if the liquid propane in the fuel tanks is too cold (0 °C [ 32 °F ]/ or less) it does not generate sufficient vapor pressure to adequately feed the burner(s). This can be overcome by charging the fuel tanks with inert gas such as nitrogen or by warming them, with electric heat tapes for example, and insulating them against the cold.

=== Tethering ===
Sometimes, especially at balloon festivals or other special events, balloons are flown while tied to the ground with ropes (tethers). This enables quick rides to many passengers, instead of long rides drifting with the wind away from the event with one load of passengers. Tethering techniques depend on the balloon manufacturer's instructions and wind conditions. Tethers can be attached to the basket, burner support, or the top of the envelope. A "night glow" is a tethered flight in darkness to enhance visual effects. While typical day flights use the main valve, using an efficient blue flame, at night tethered pilots use the liquid valve "whisper burner" ("cow burner", as it does not startle livestock), creating a spectacular bright orange flame.

Though tethered, a balloon is considered a registered flying aircraft when it leaves the ground.

== Events ==
There are many regular gatherings of balloons and balloonists around the world. Most of these events are held on an annual basis. The festivities provide both a place for balloonists to interact as well as a venue for entertaining spectators. Events range in size from a few balloons and no spectators to hundreds of balloons with hundreds of thousands of spectators. The largest such event in the world is the Albuquerque International Balloon Fiesta, held every October in Albuquerque, New Mexico, followed by the Grand Est Mondial Air in France. The Bristol International Balloon Fiesta is another notable European event of this nature.

== Gallery ==
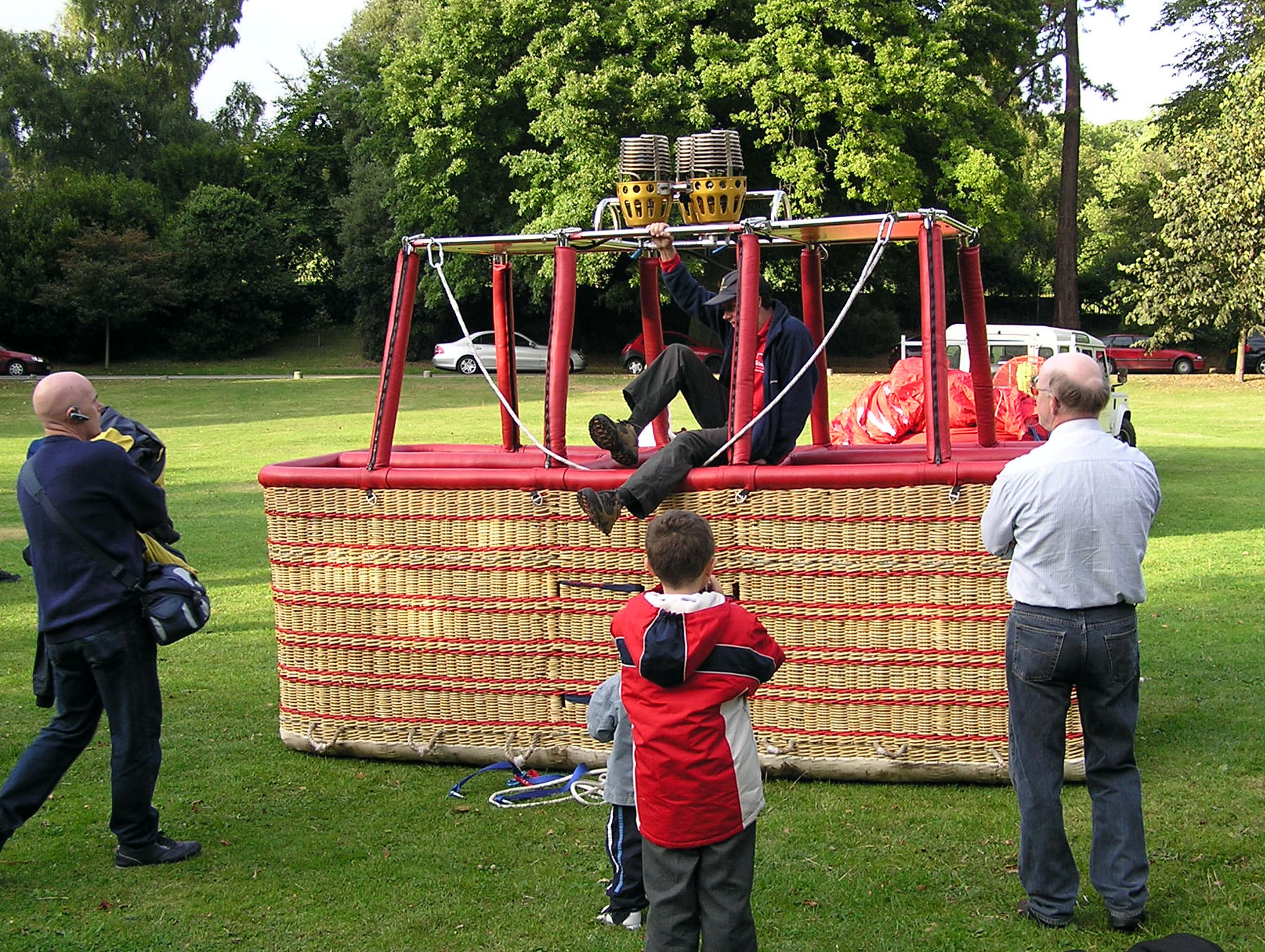
Preparing for flight: This large wicker balloon basket holds 16 passengers. The pilot is climbing out after his pre-flight tests

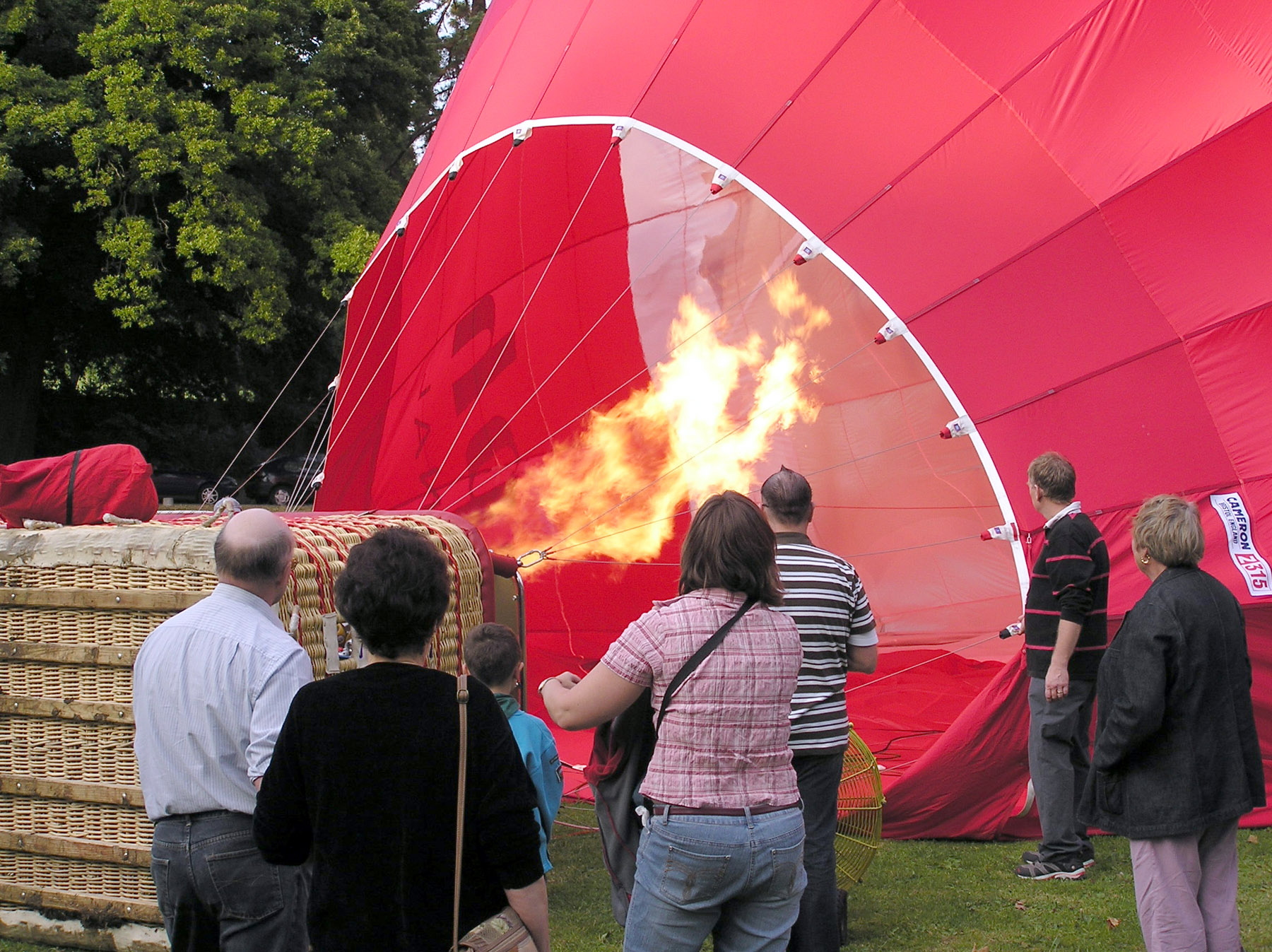
Final Inflation: Firing the propane burners to complete inflation

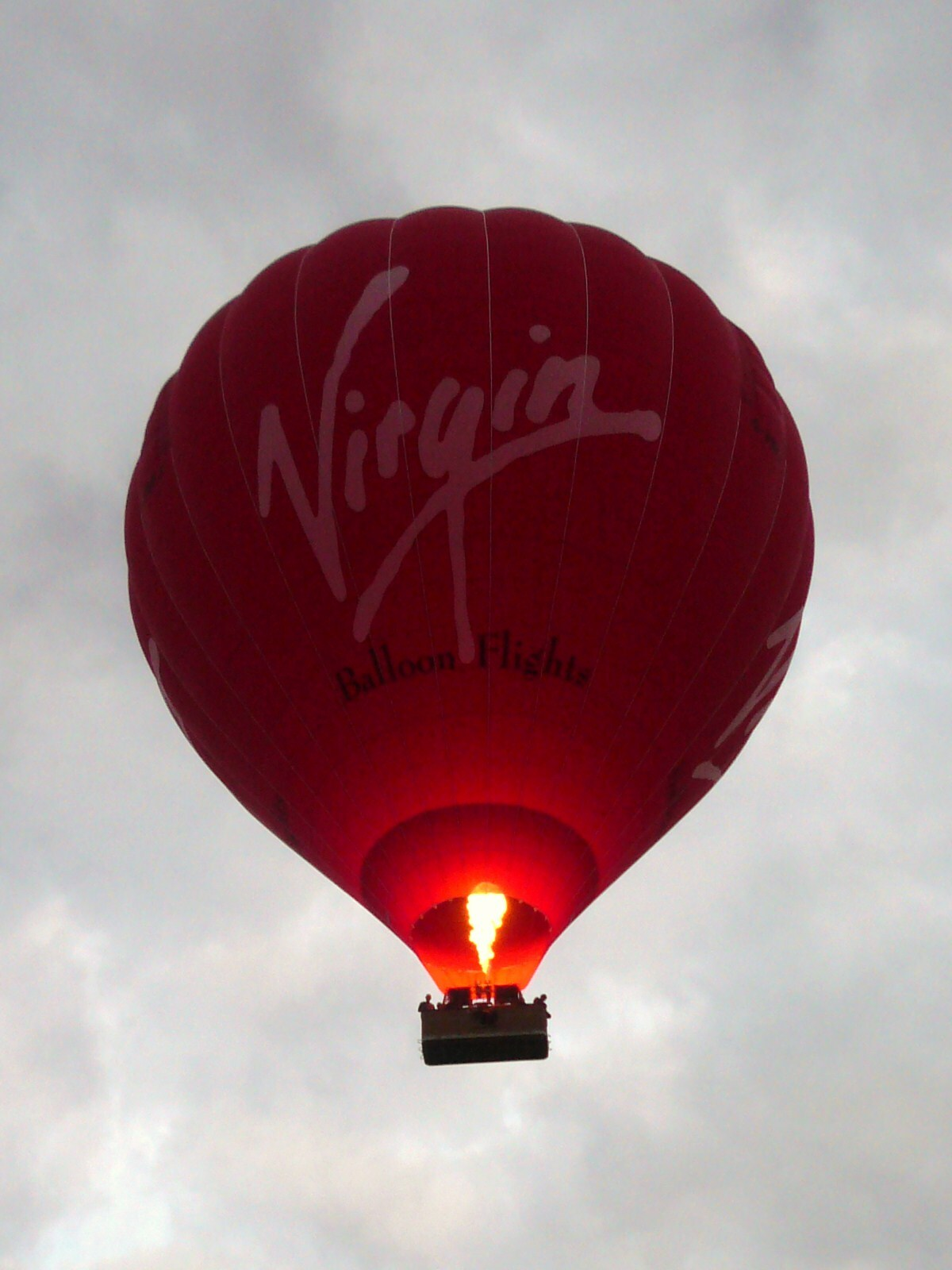
Flight: A Virgin hot air balloon flying over Cambridge

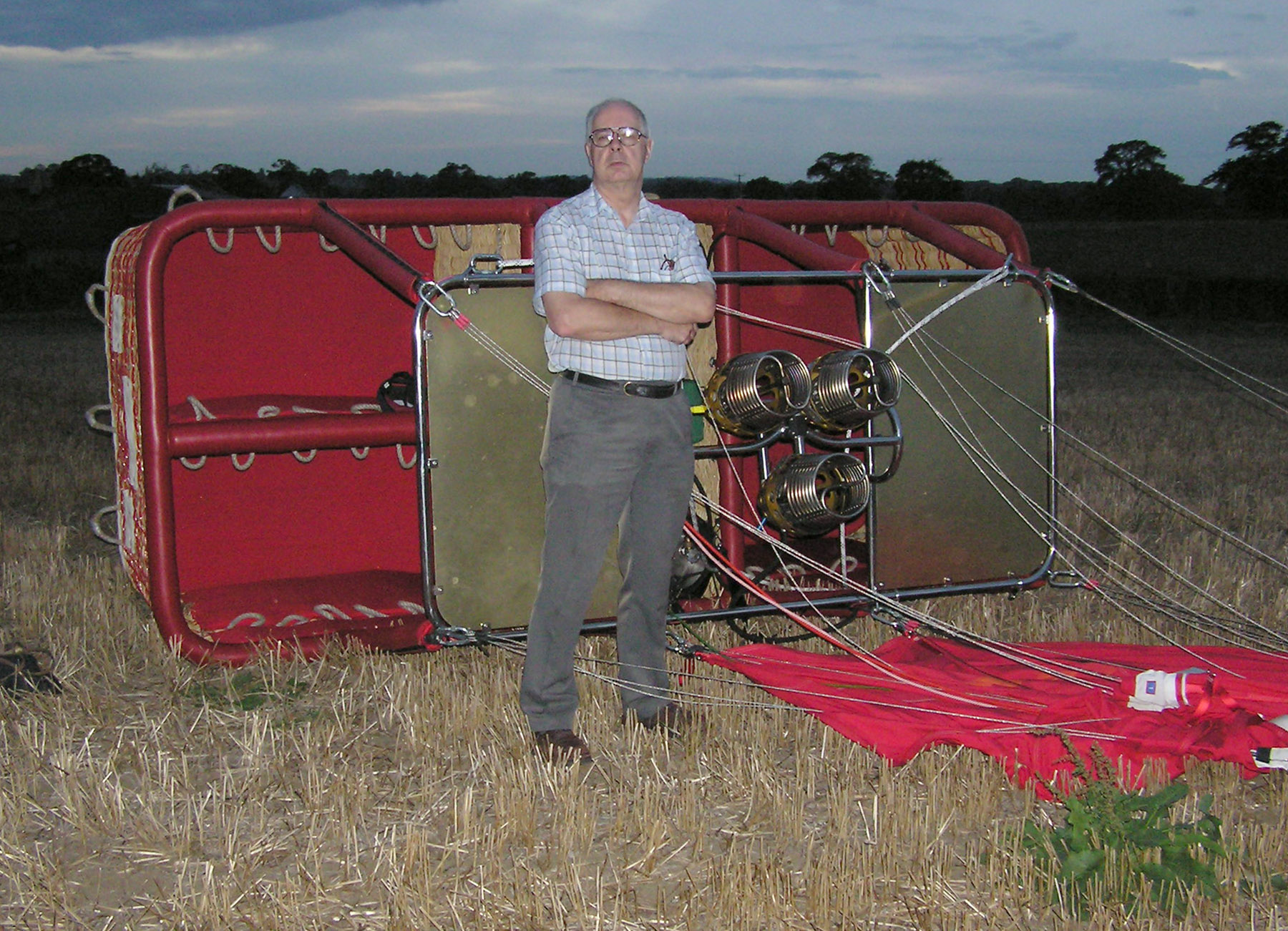
Landing: An unusual top view of the basket, after tipping onto its side during landing at dusk

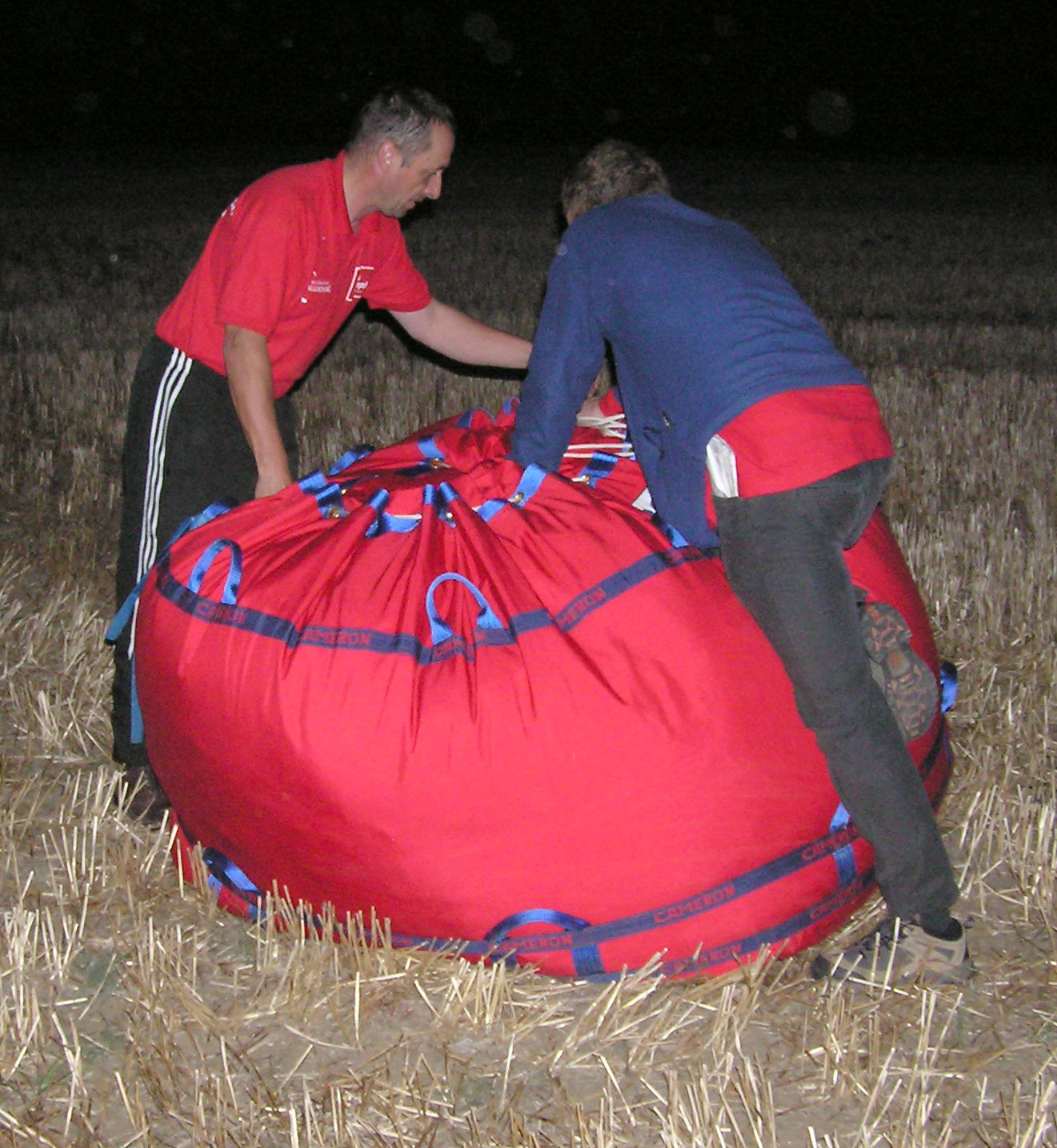
Retrieval: The envelope is packed back into its bag for storage until the next flight

== Ballooning in the world ==
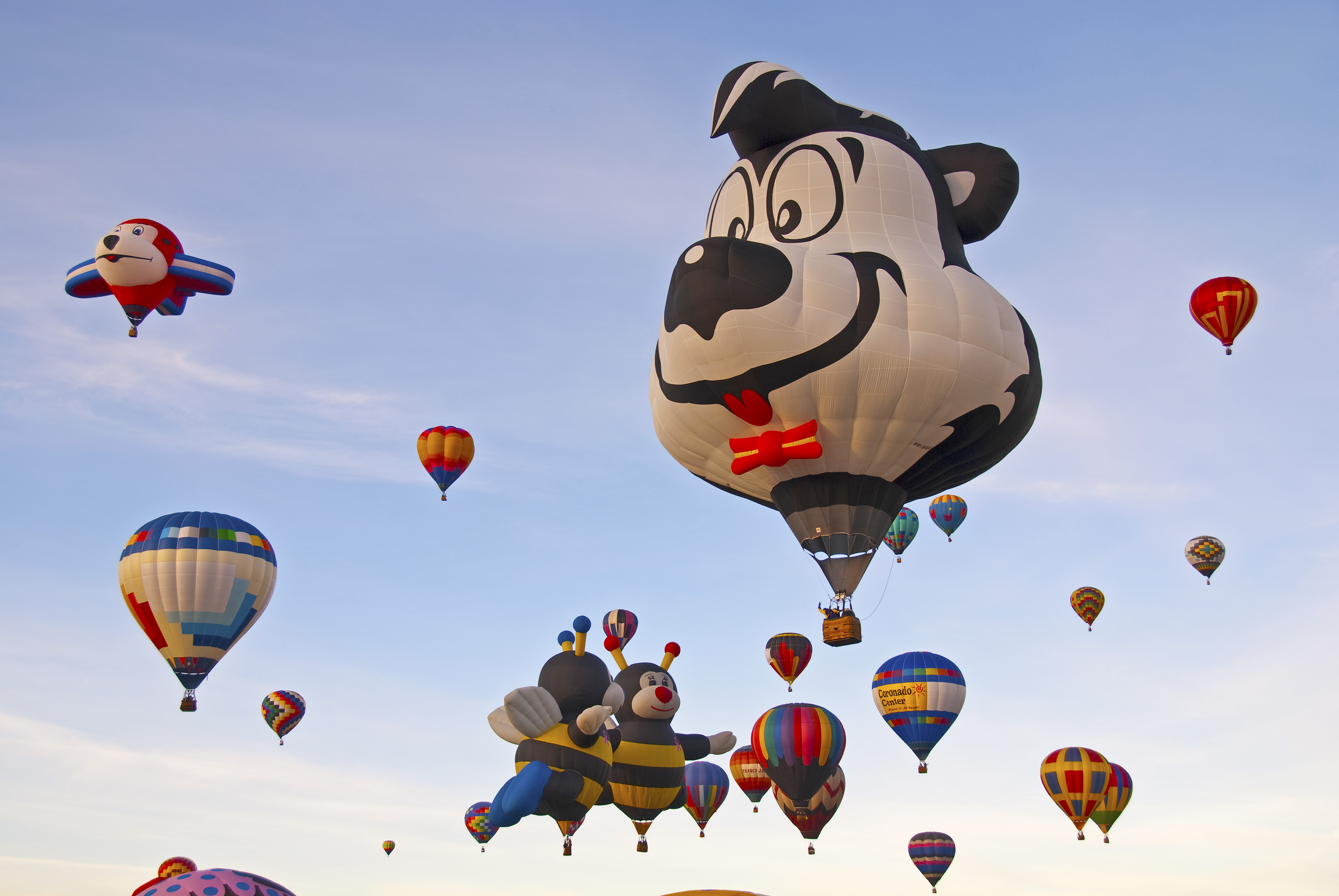
Albuquerque, New Mexico, U.S.

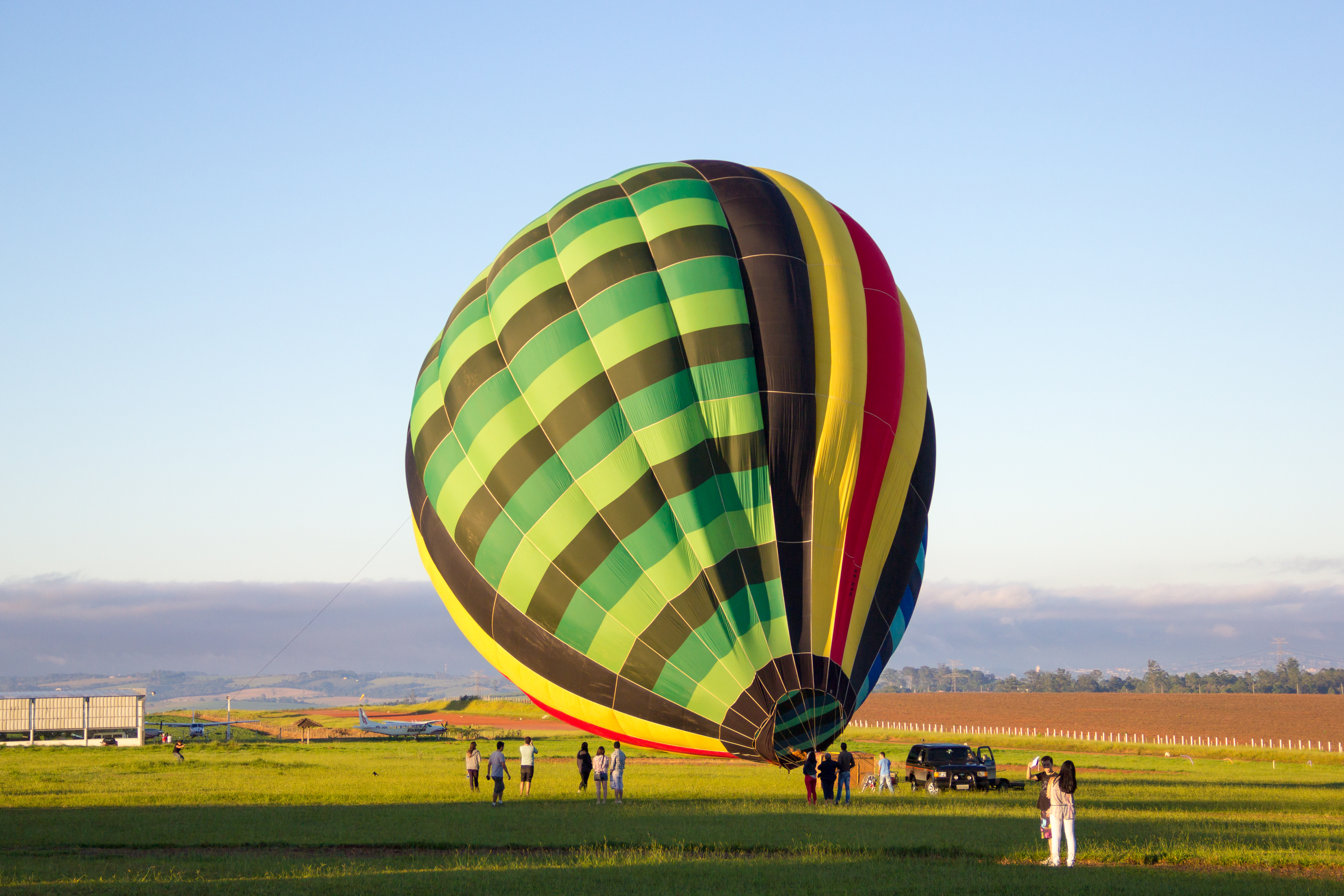
Boituva, São Paulo, Brazil

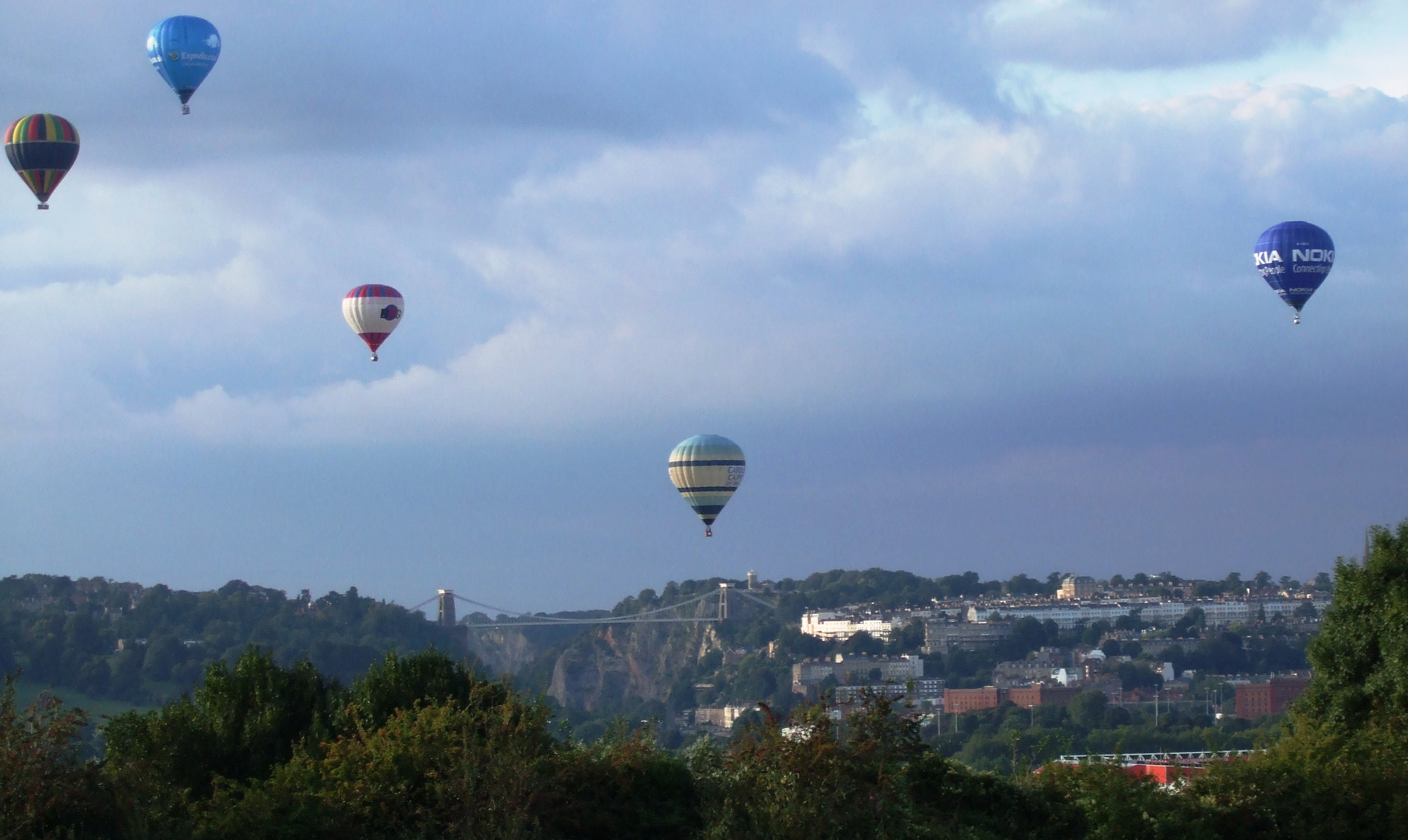
Bristol, England

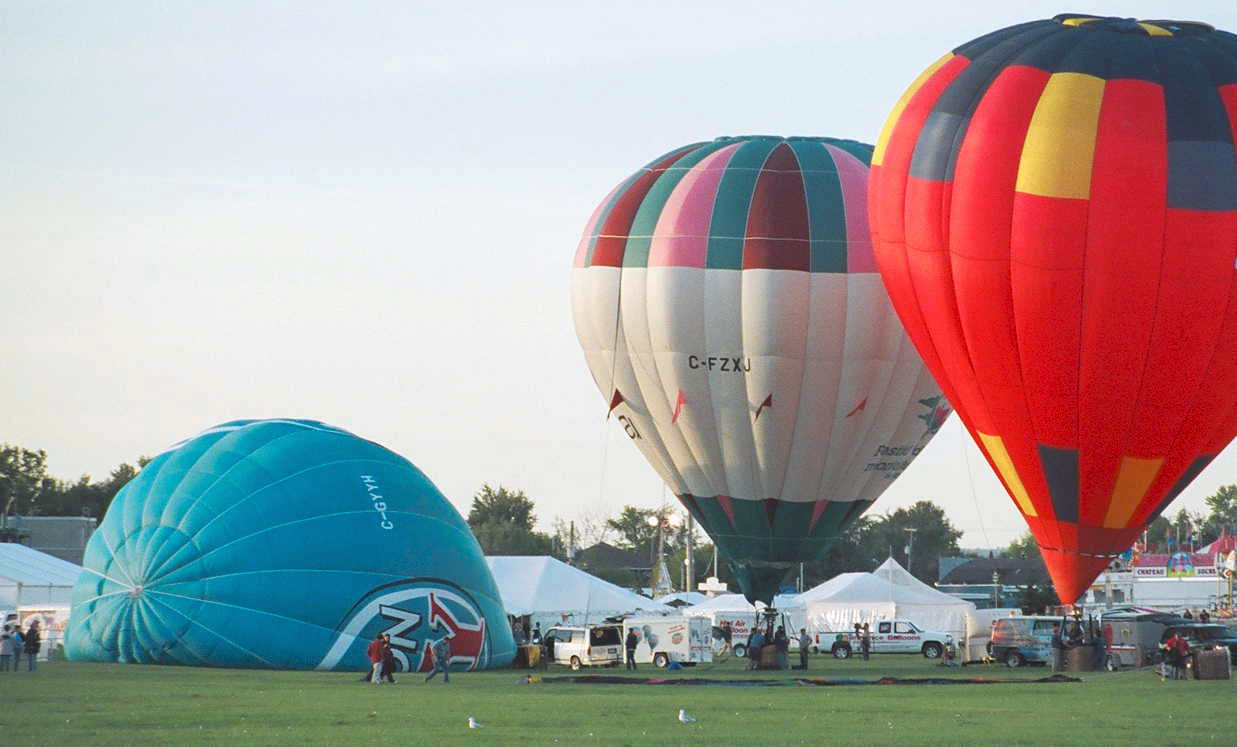
Gatineau, Quebec, Canada

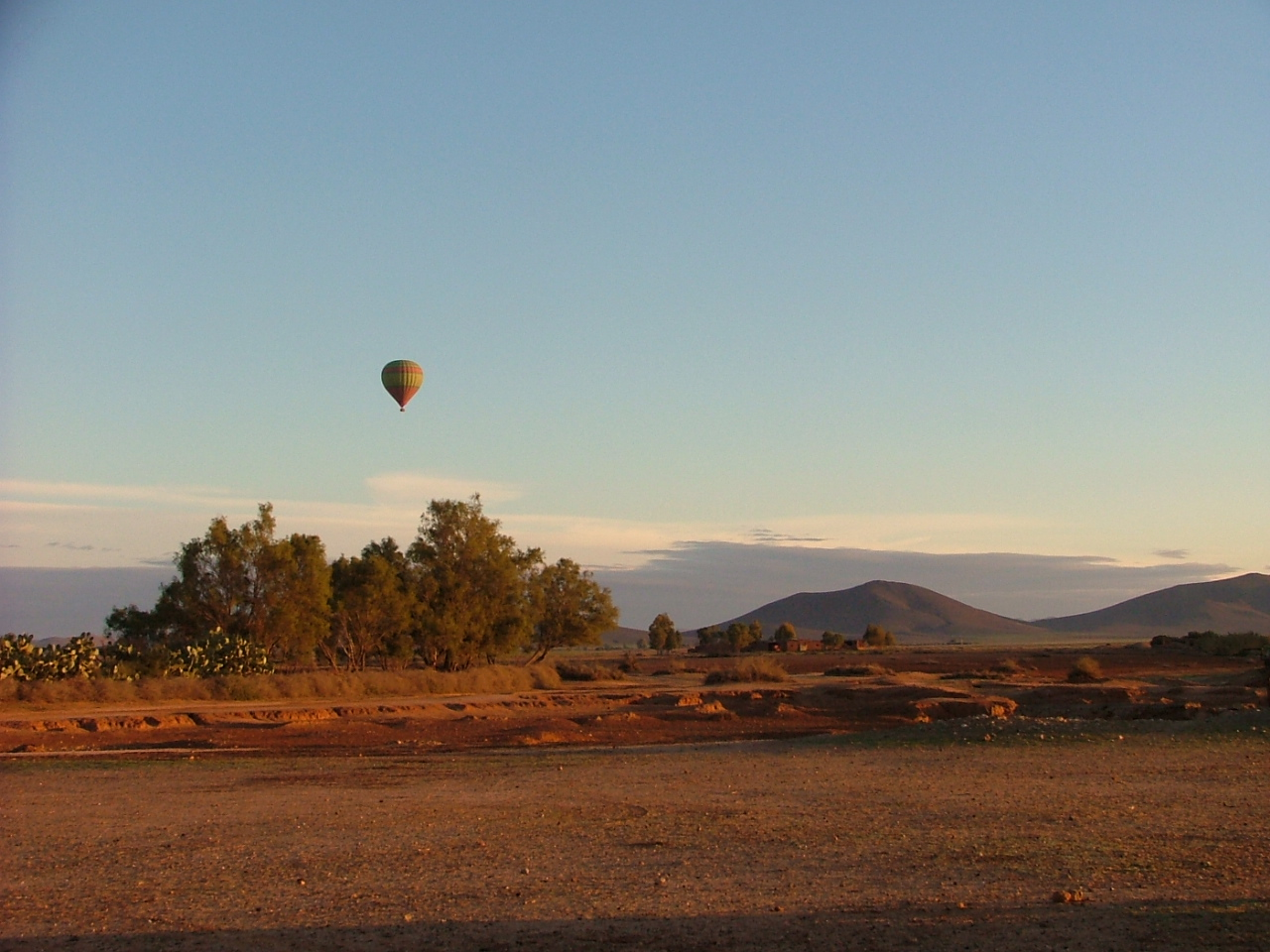
Marrakesh, Morocco

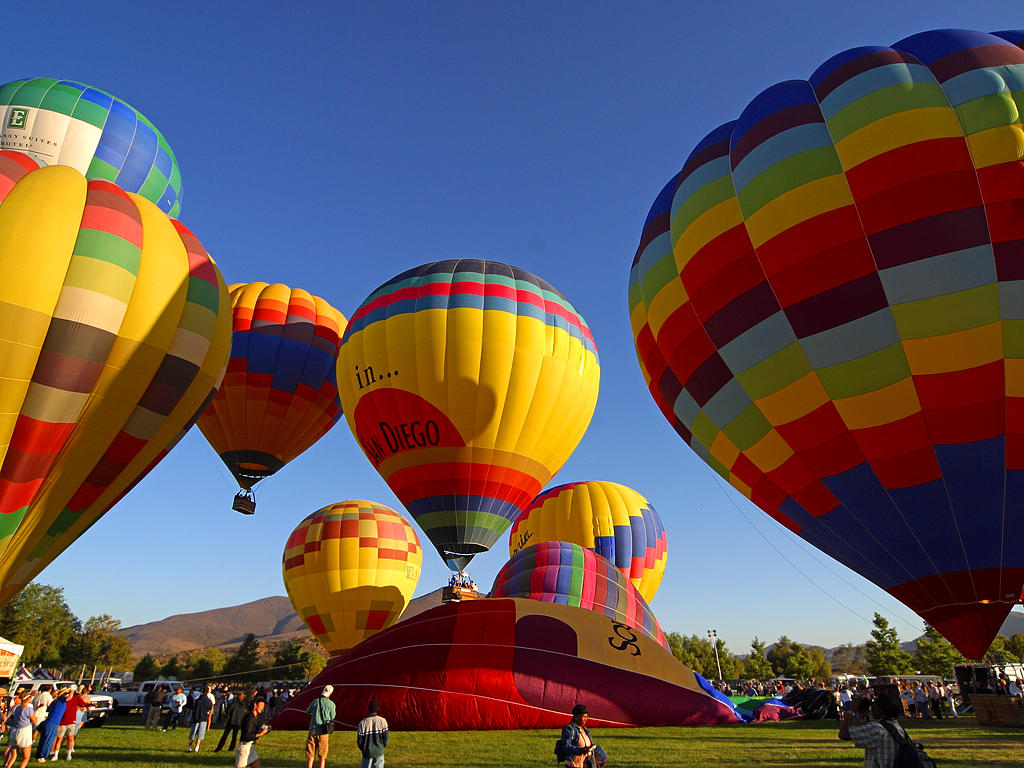
San Diego, California, U.S.

Warstein, Germany

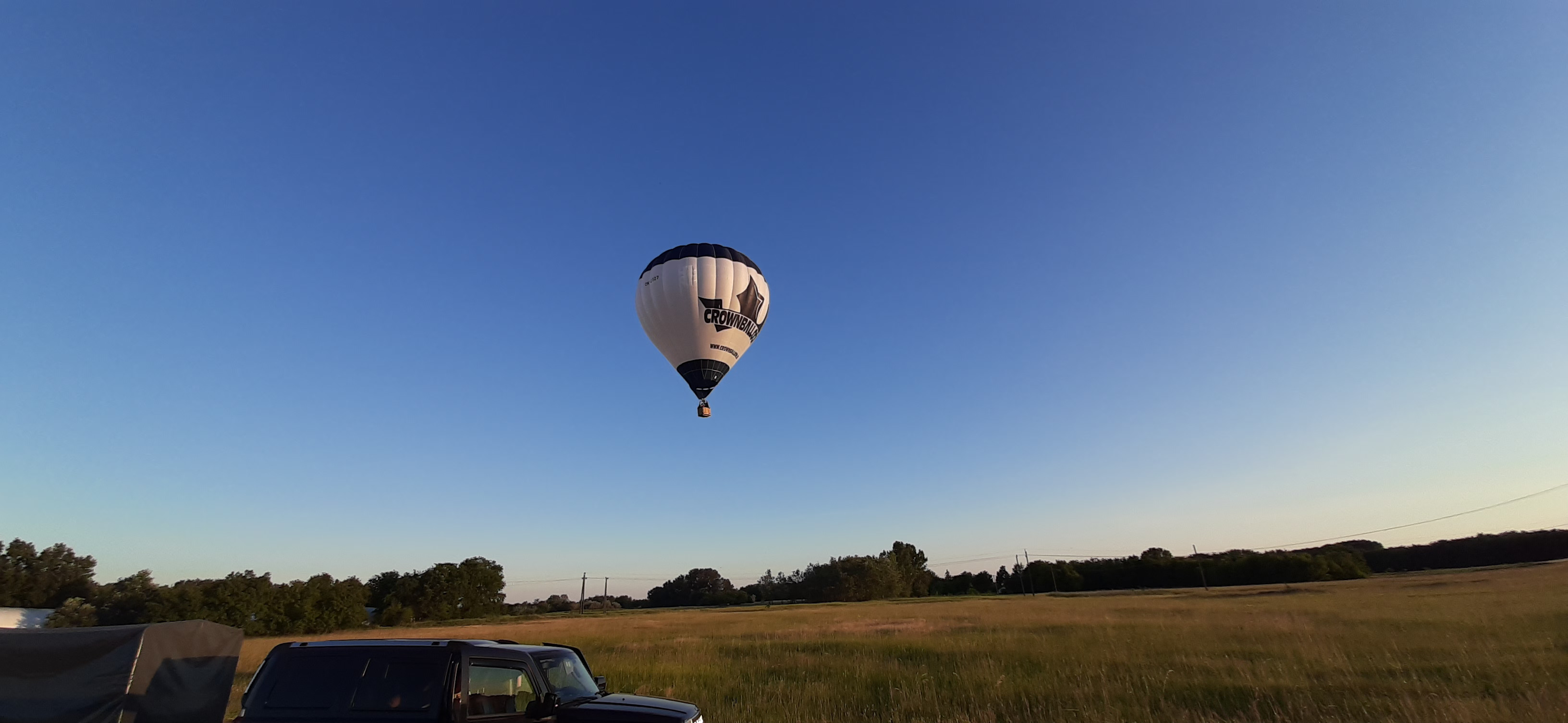
Banat-Crișana, Romania

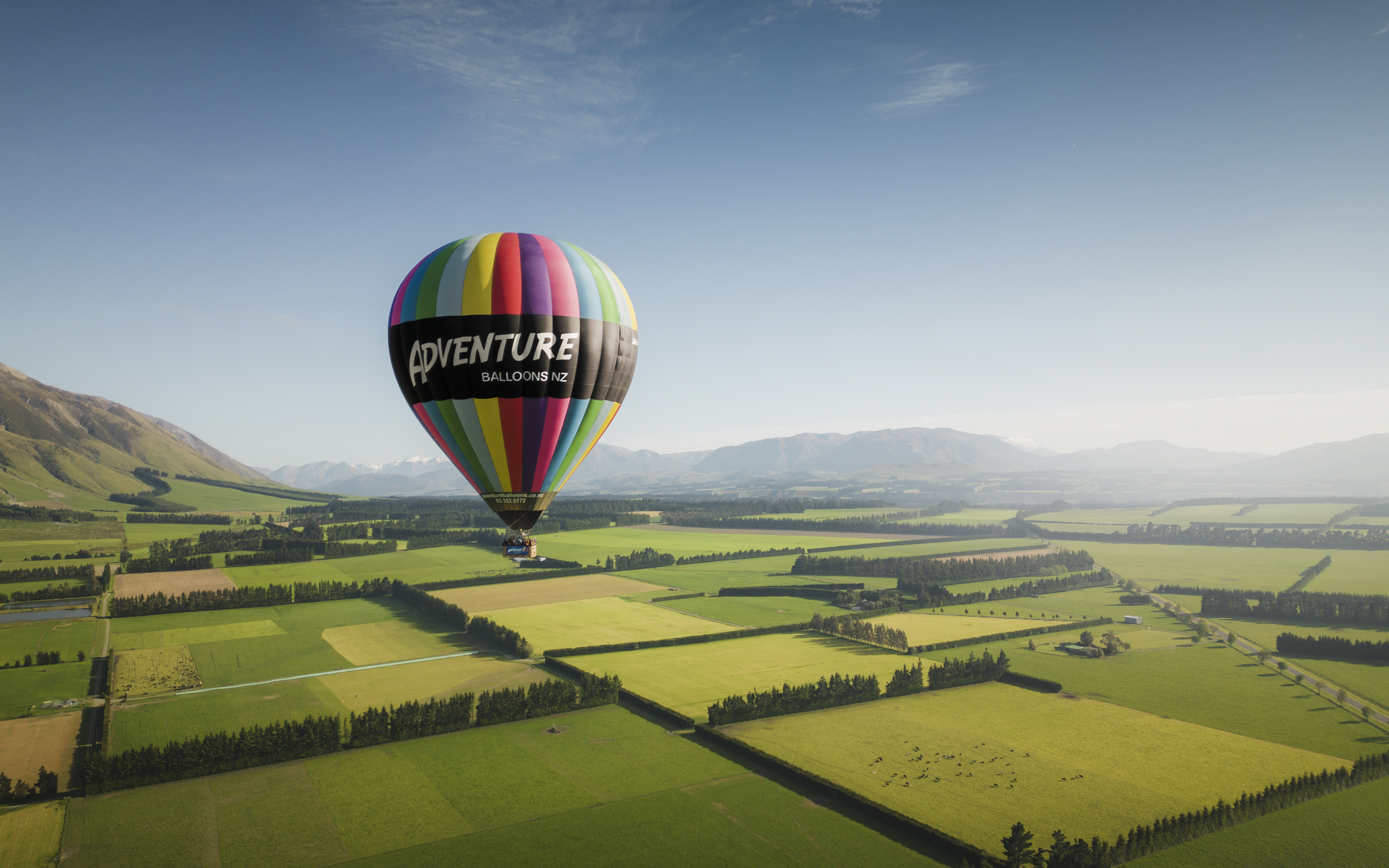
Methven, New Zealand

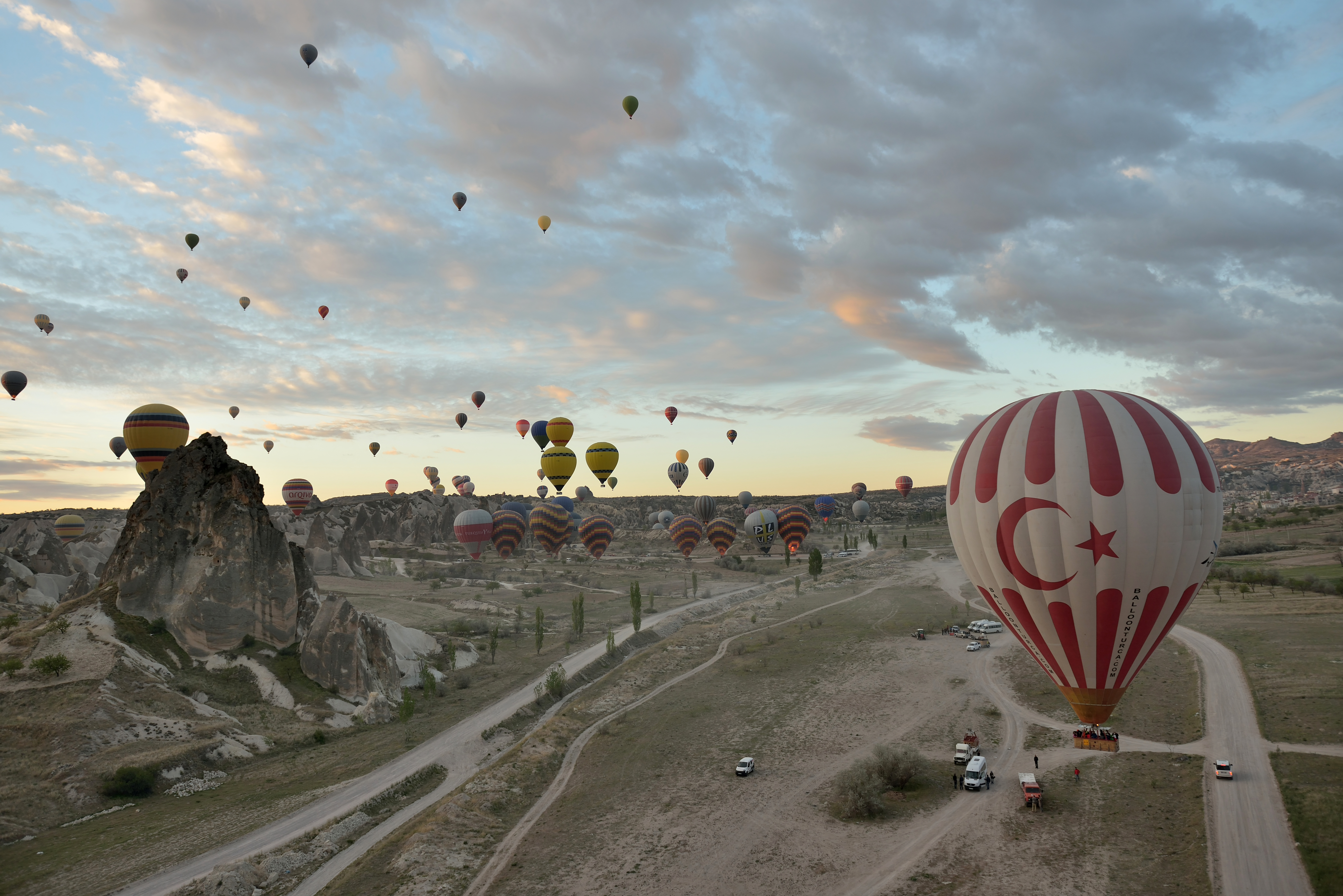
Uçhisar, Cappadocia, Turkey

== See also ==
- Fédération Aéronautique Internationale
- List of balloon uses
