= Balloon helicopter =

Flying toy

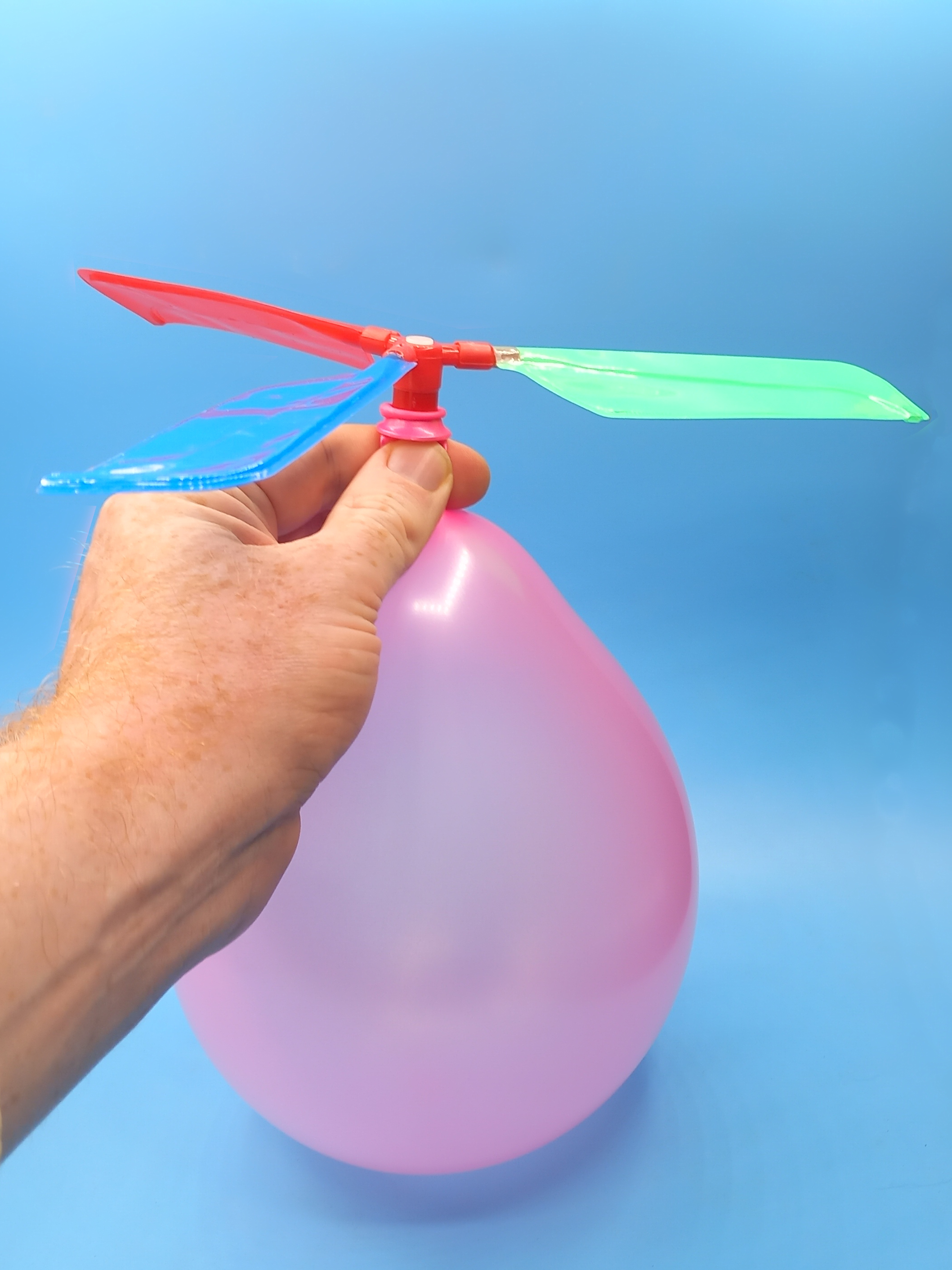
Balloon helicopter

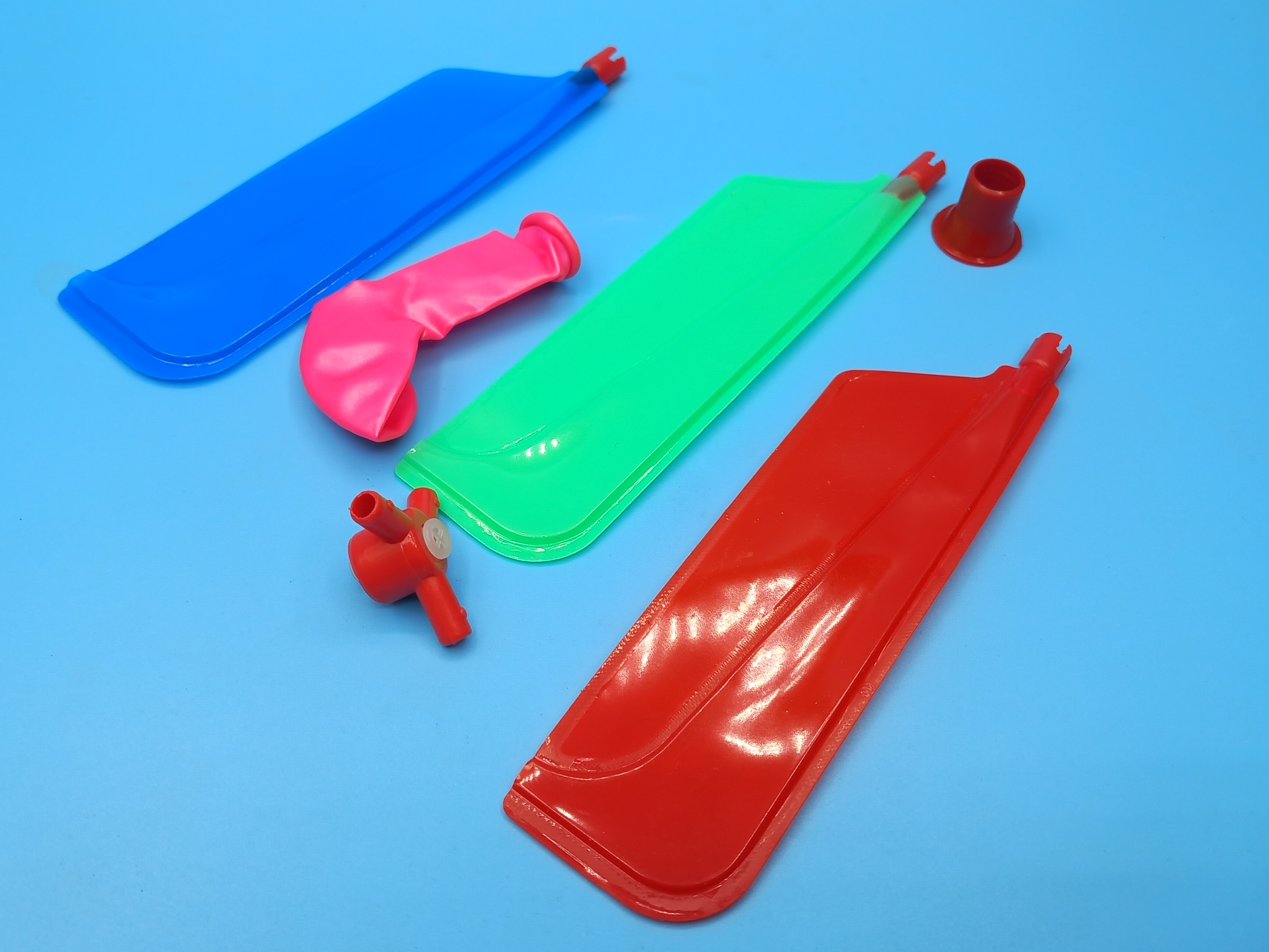
the individual parts of a Balloon helicopter

A balloon helicopter is a flying toy consisting of a latex toy balloon and a plastic propeller, derived from the simple balloon rocket. The most important feature is the hollow propeller hub which directs air into a passage in each propeller blade. The air passages channel air to the blade tips such that air escapes in a fine jet tangentially. The air jets on the blade tips causes the entire toy to spin, the blades have a positive angle of attack so the blades experience a lifting force as they push air downwards. It can attain a height of approximately 12 meters (40 feet). Full-scale helicopters have been built around this tip jet configuration.

== See also ==
- Balloon rocket
