= Toy balloon =

Small balloon used as a children's toy

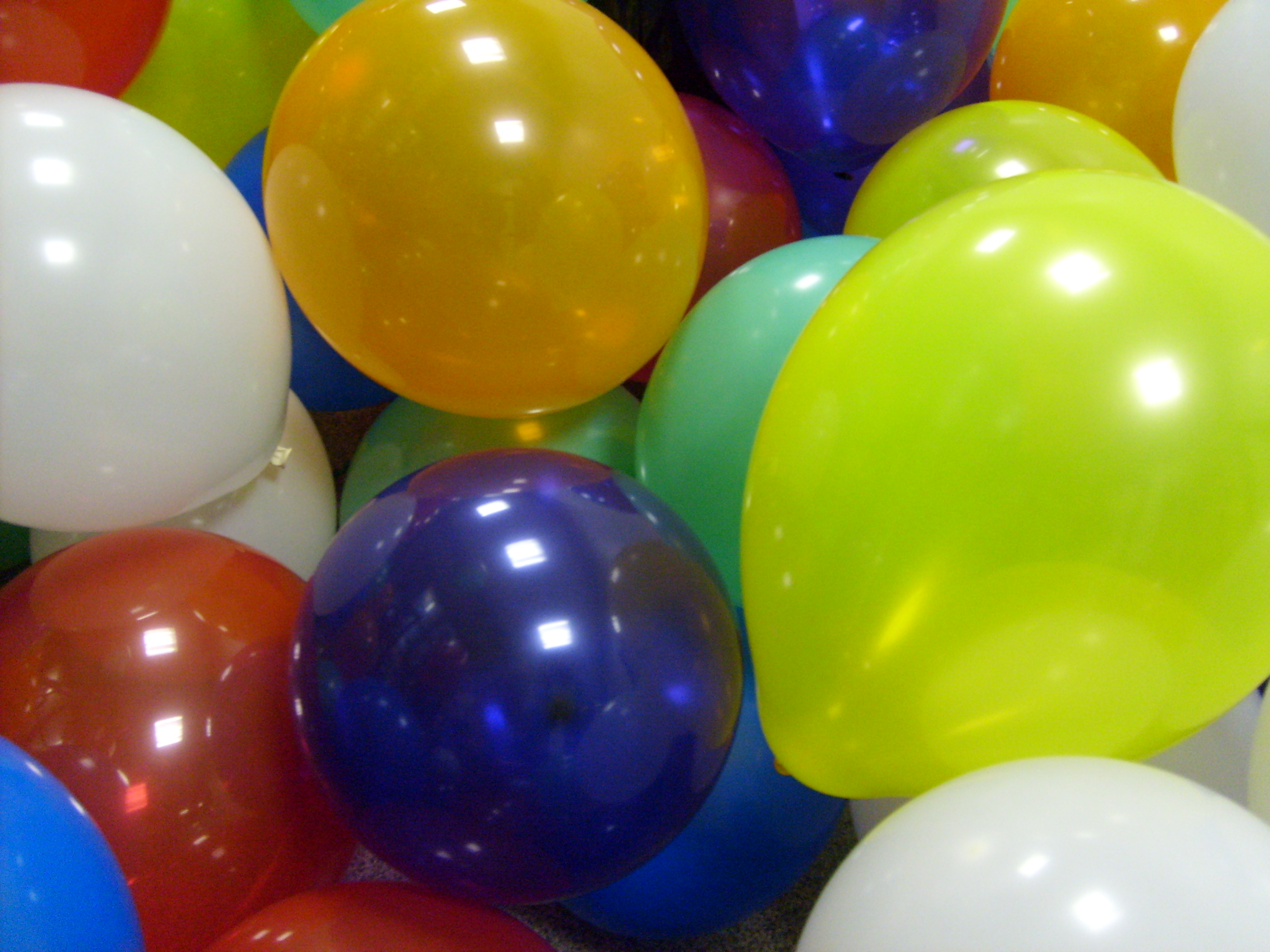
Inflated party balloons

A toy balloon or party balloon is a small balloon mostly used for decoration, advertising and as a toy. Toy balloons are usually made of rubber or aluminized plastic and inflated with air or helium. They come in a great variety of sizes and shapes but are most commonly 10 to 30 centimetres (3.9 to 11.8 in) in diameter. Toy balloons are not considered to include "sky lanterns" (hot-air paper balloons), although these too are or were used as child toys in some parts of the world.

== History ==
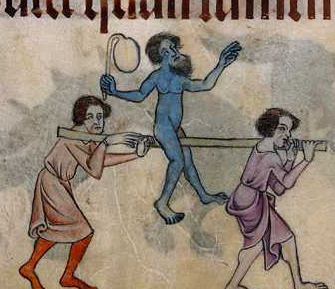
Illustration from the Luttrell Psalter (c. 1320 – c. 1340) depicting a pig bladder balloon

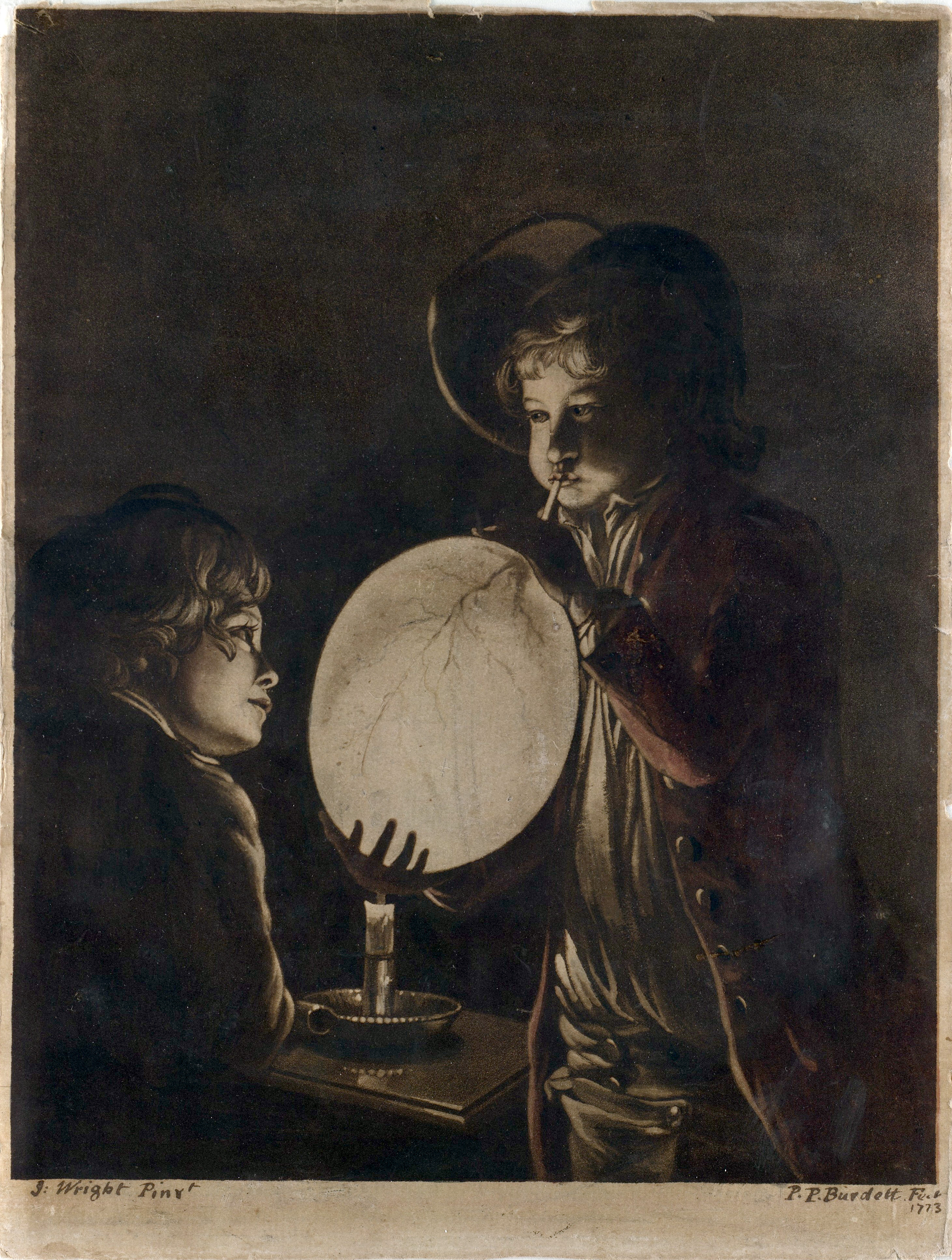
Children inflating a bladder, painting c. 1773

Early balloons were made from pig bladders and animal intestines. There are references to balloons made of whale intestine in The Swiss Family Robinson (1813) and in Moby-Dick (1851).

Since the 1890s, paper balloons called kamifūsen have been popular children's toys in Japan.

== Health and safety issues ==
=== Choking hazards ===
According to The Journal of the American Medical Association, out of 373 children who died in the US between 1972 and 1992 after choking on children's products, nearly a third choked on latex balloons. The Consumer Product Safety Commission found that children had inhaled latex balloons whole or choked on fragments of broken balloons. Parents, a monthly magazine about raising children, advised parents to buy Mylar balloons instead of latex balloons.

=== Health benefits ===
Blowing a balloon by mouth is good for health because it exercises the intercostal muscles, which expand and lift the ribs and diaphragm, improving lung function and oxygen saturation. This exercise can improve posture, stability and breathing patterns, and it helps increase lung capacity, making it useful for conditions such as pulmonary fibrosis, COPD or asthma. In addition, balloon inflation opposes the diaphragm for efficient breathing and helps increase intra-abdominal pressure, making it a useful exercise for rehabilitation and respiratory function.

== Foil balloons ==
Foil balloons are made from an inelastic plastic such as biaxially-oriented PET film allowing them to be printed with designs that are not distorted by inflation. They typically have a shiny metallic coating giving them the appearance of foil.

There have been concerns about metallic balloons causing short circuits when caught in overhead power lines if not disposed of correctly.

== Balloon shapes ==
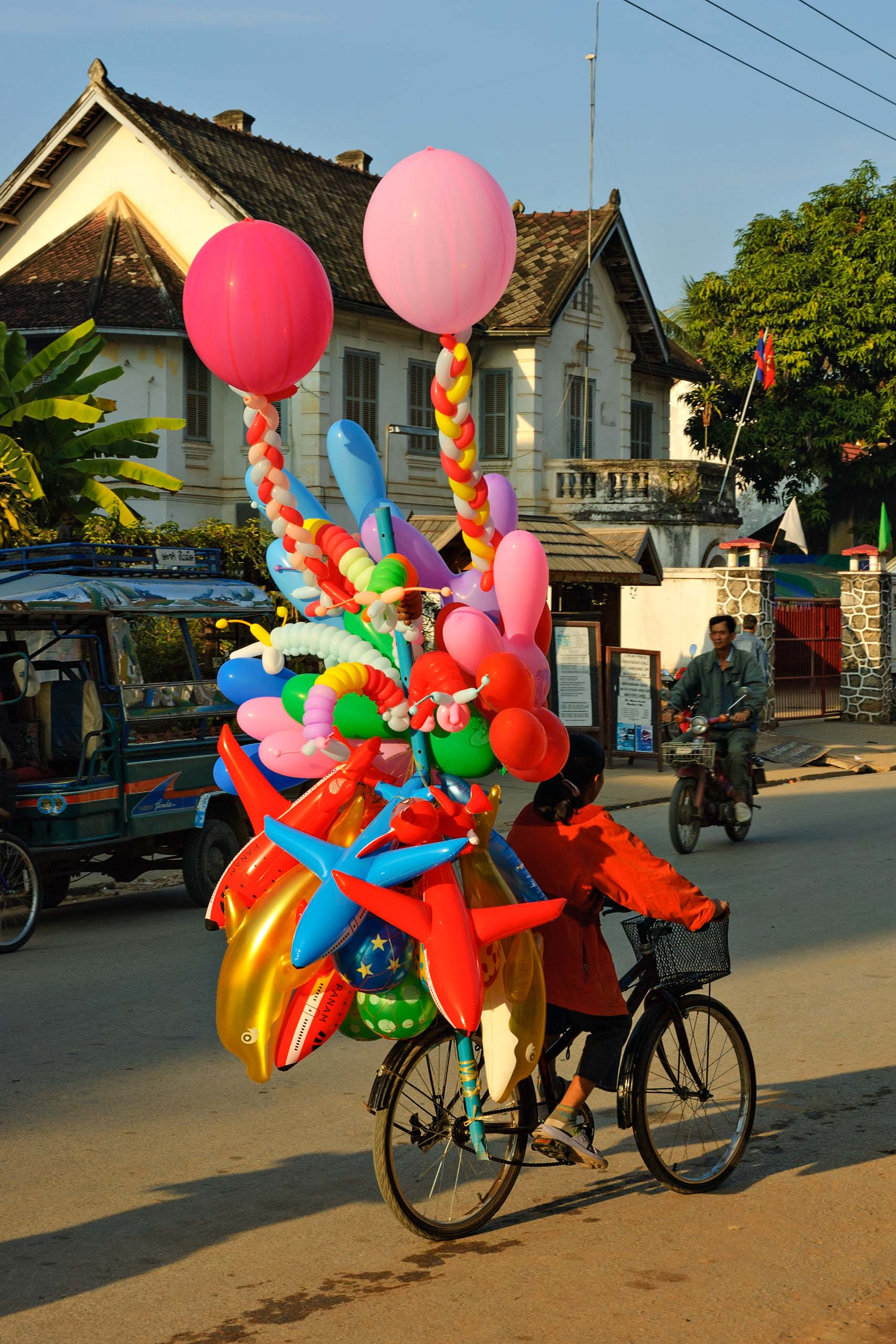
Balloons in various shapes and colors, saleswoman on her bicycle, Luang Prabang, Laos

Most toy balloons are a simple oval-like shape (such as a prolate spheroid). But balloon suppliers also offers other shapes for toy balloons. Some examples of other shapes are: "zeppelins" or "airships", where balloons are usually longer than wide; "espirals" or "rattlesnakes", similar to zeppelins, but much longer (not to be confused with balloons for twisting); "hearts", balloons with the shape of a heart; "dolls", two round shapes joined that represent a head and a body; "mouseheads", composed of three round parts, one for the head and two for the ears; "bunnyheads", similar to mouseheads but with long ears; "bunny balloons", which resemble a stuffed toy bunny, having a big long shape for the body, a smaller shape for the head, and two long shapes for the ears; "elephants", with two shapes for the body and the head, and a very long shape for the trunk; and "ducks", with a big shape for the body, a smaller round shape for the head and smaller shape for the beak. There are many other possible shapes, depending on the manufacturers.

== Balloon modeling ==
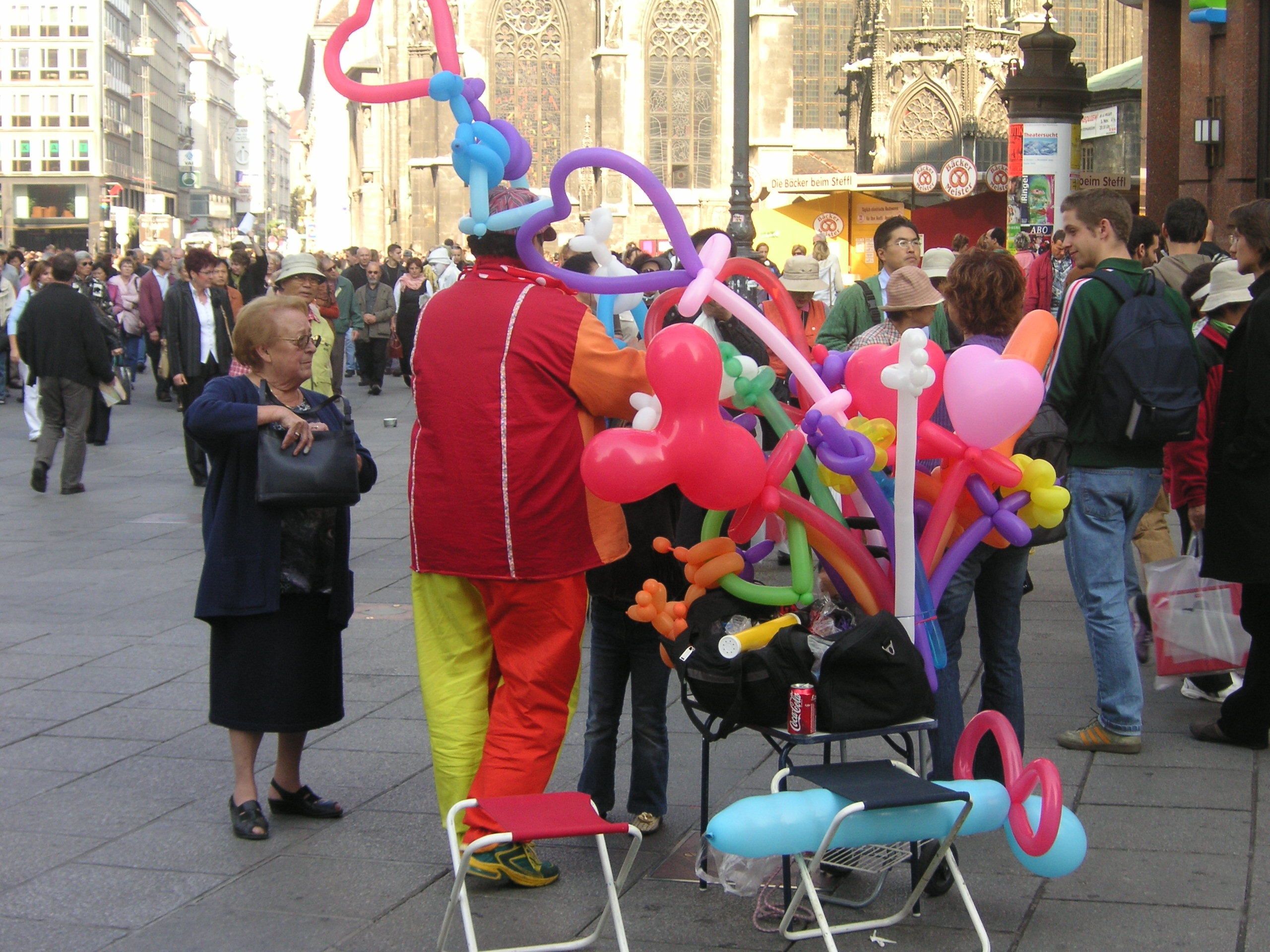
A balloon artist in Vienna, Austria

There are balloons that are longer and more cylindrical. These long balloons are often twisted and bent into simple, or intricate shapes which will hold their form when released. Balloon artists are people who quickly twist balloons into familiar or abstract shapes using the techniques of balloon modelling, usually for profit. Other names for balloon modeling include: balloon twisting, balloon bending, or simply twisting.

Artists who practice balloon modeling are called: Balloon Twisters, Balloon Benders, Balloon Modeler and even have been referred to as a Latex Vessel Reconstruction Engineer.

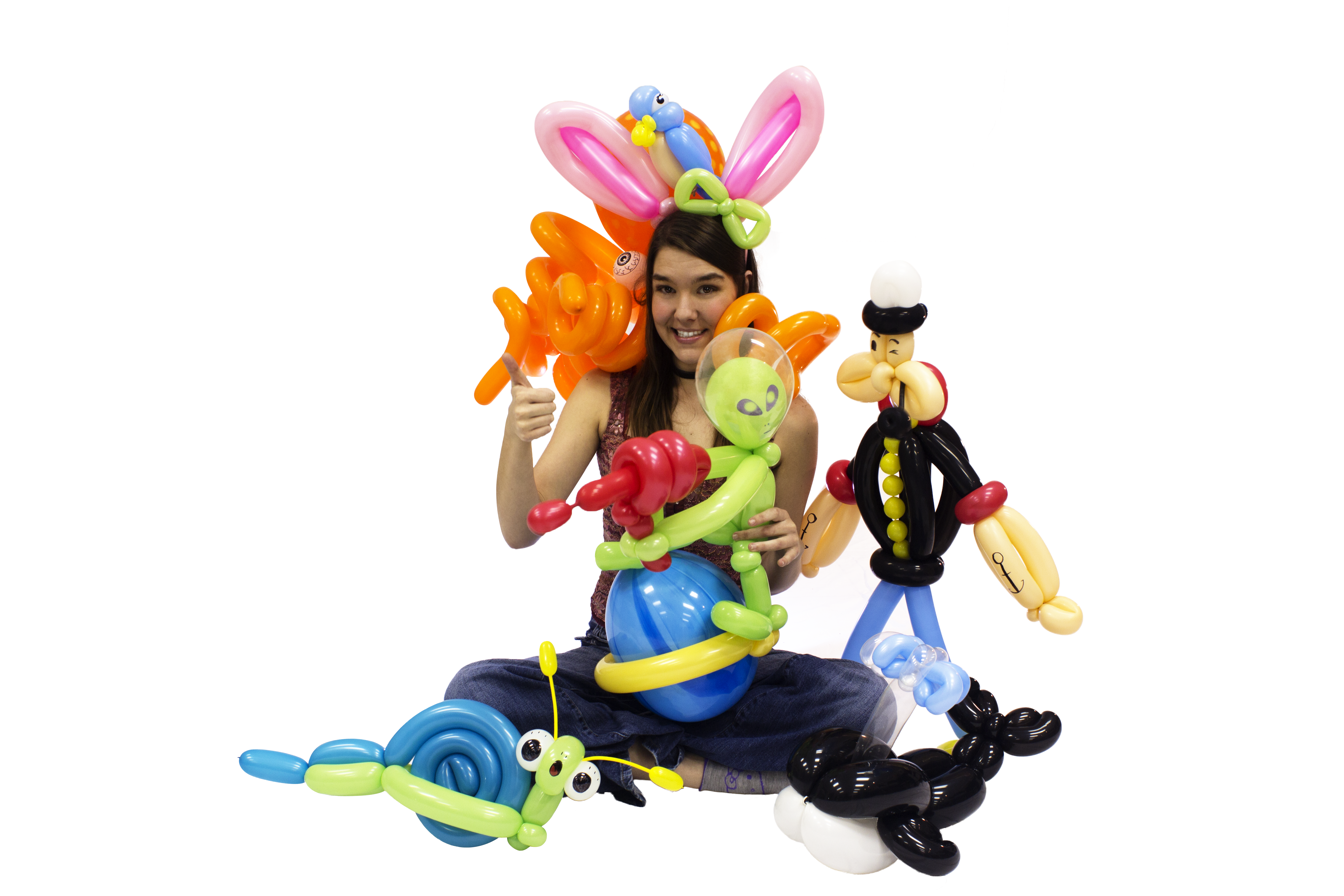
A number of balloon twisting figures and a child with modeling balloons made into different shapes.

The types of balloons used for this practice are pencil balloons and are called 160s, 260s, 350s, 360s, 660s or 646s. These number designations refer to the sizes of the balloons and roughly equate to the diameter and the length of the balloon when fully inflated. The 260, one of the most common animal balloon sizes, would be 2 inches in diameter and then 60 inches long when fully inflated.

The modeling balloons can be made into simple dogs, hearts, and swords or can be made into more intricate shapes such as dragons, cartoon characters, or even figments of the imagination. More and more, nearly anything is becoming possible with balloon twisting and it shows at major industry conventions such as Twist and Shout, the largest balloon twisting convention in the world.

== Uses ==
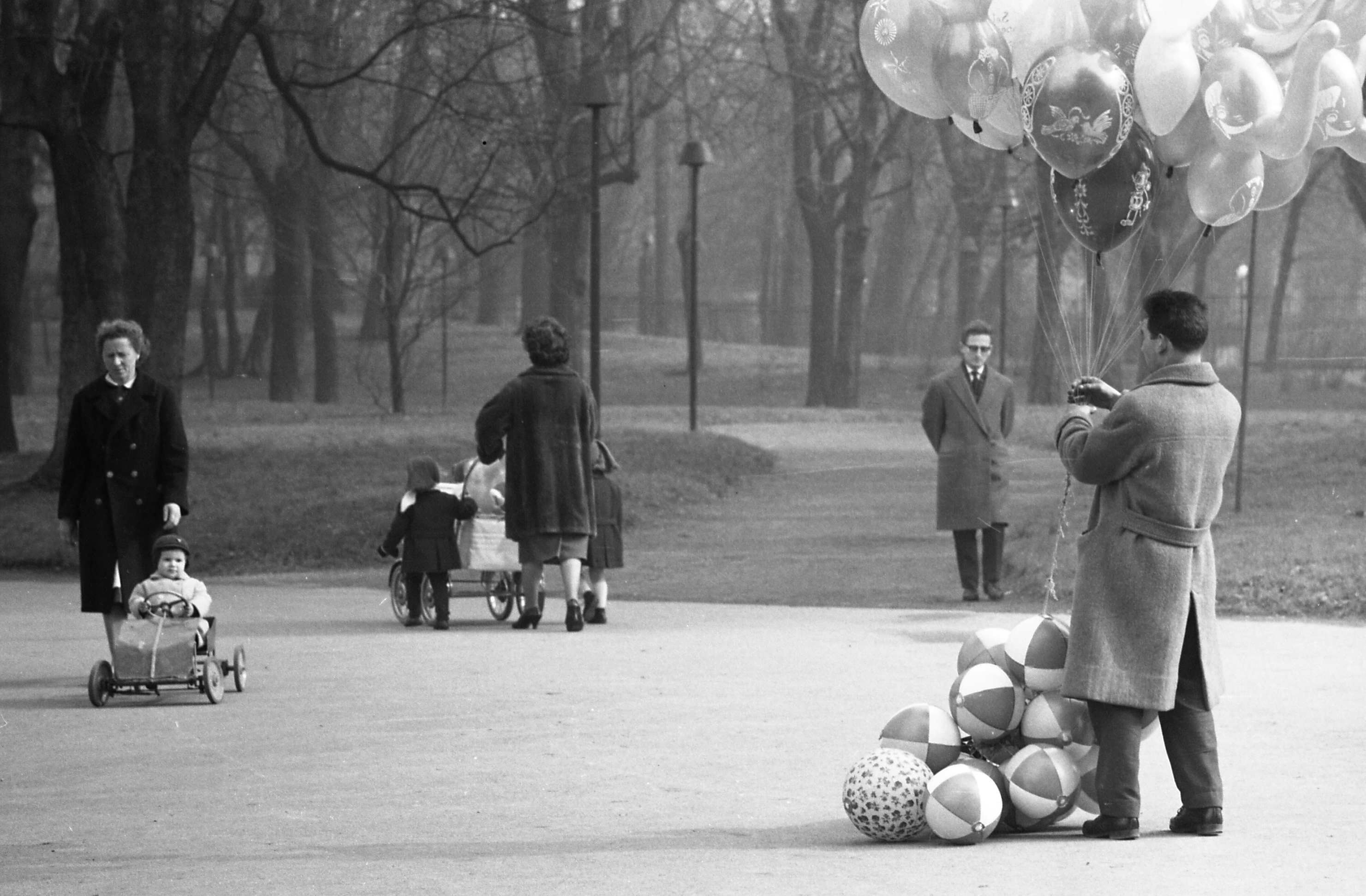
Selling of toy balloons (1962)

Decorative purposes

Toy balloons are used as decorations and/or advertising space. Balloons are usually purchased in deflated form, however, some party stores and vendors at special events will fill their balloons before selling them, this is called "balloon stuffing" where the balloons are filled with objects such as smaller balloons, teddy bears, etc.

Education

While toy balloons are primarily a toy, they are also sometimes used for demonstrations and experiments in classrooms. Balloons may be used to demonstrate the function of a pair of lungs in a chest cavity. By placing one in a vacuum chamber, they visually demonstrate the concept of air pressure by expanding when air is evacuated from the chamber. Other experiments provide an elementary, visible method of portraying stress and strain, chemical reactions between acids and bases, heat conduction, centripetal force, and distributed pressure. Lastly, a wide variety of Rube Goldberg machines apply balloons either as a step in the contraption, or as the end goal. The balloon may be used as the former upon popping in one of several ways: support an object, be propelled to move a light object, serve as a obstacle, or frighten an animal.

Water-based activities

Toy balloons can be filled with water and used in a variety of ways, usually for fun. They can be thrown, or set up to drop on the head of an unsuspecting victim. Water balloons are balloons specifically designed to be filled with water.

Some Australians report using water balloons around their house during bushfires, as the heat of the flames breaks the balloon and causes the water to land on the fire.

Noisemaking

The noises created from a toy balloon are a staple element of sound design in popular media, especially in comedic animation and cartoons to represent inflatable objects in a comical manner. In addition, toy balloons have been used in place of firecrackers in some parts of South Asia and East Asia. These are prepared by tying multiple bunches of balloons on a long string or ribbon, passing one end of the string through a hole of an annulus-shaped disk (or a plate with a hole) studded with fastening screws, with the sharp ends of the screws pointed towards the balloons. The disk would be anchored to a base. The "firecracker" effect would be initiated by a person (or a machine) pulling on the ribbon and feeding it through the disk, while the noises are generated by the screw tips bursting the balloons in quick succession.

Classical comic musical composer P. D. Q. Bach has written several pieces featuring them, including Pervertimento for Bagpipes, Bicycle and Balloons, the Erotica Variations for Banned Instruments and Piano, and the 1712 Overture.

== See also ==
- Balloon modelling (balloon animal)
- Balloon release
- Balloon rocket
- List of inflatable manufactured goods
