= Balloon rocket =

Rubber balloon filled with air or other gases

A balloon rocket is a rubber balloon filled with air or other gases. Besides being simple toys, balloon rockets are widely used as a teaching device to demonstrate basic physics.

== How it works ==
To launch a simple rocket, the untied opening of an inflated balloon is released. The elasticity of the balloon contracts the air out through the opening with sufficient force and the resulting pressure creates a thrust which propels the balloon forward as it deflates. It is usual for the balloon to be propelled somewhat uncontrollably (or fly in and unstable centre of mass), as well as turbulence that occur in the opening as the air escapes, causing it to flap rapidly and disperses air outwards in random direction.

Near the end of its deflation, the balloon may suddenly shoot quickly in the air shortly before it drops down, due to the rubber rapidly squeezing out the remaining air inside as it reaches the inclination to return to its uninflated size.

The flight altitude only amounts to some meters, with larger or lighter balloons often achieving longer flights. In addition, a cylindrical-shaped (or "airship") balloon may have a more stable flight when released.

If the balloon is inflated with helium or other lighter than air gases, it tends to fly in an inclined trajectory (usually going upwards), due to the light nature of the gas.

== In physics ==
The balloon rocket can be used easily to demonstrate simple physics, namely Newton's third law of motion.

A common experiment with a balloon rocket consists in adding other objects such as a string or fishing line, a drinking straw and adhesive tape to the balloon itself. The string is threaded through the straw and is attached at both ends to fixed objects. The straw is then taped to the side of the inflated balloon, with the mouth of the balloon touching the object it is pointed. When the balloon is released, it propels itself along the length of the string. Alternatively, a balloon rocket car can be built.

== Rocket balloon ==
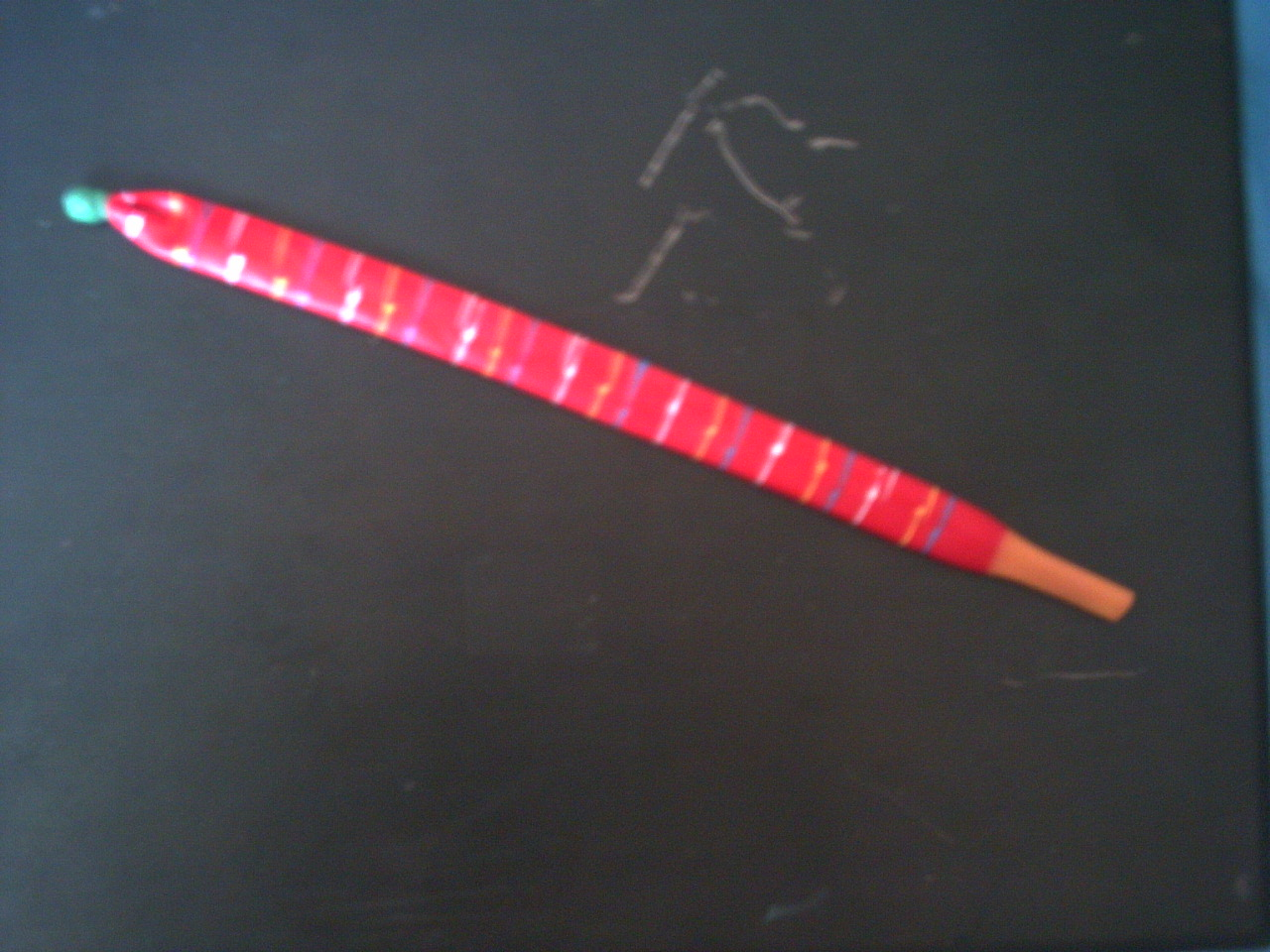
A rocket balloon without its pump attached

There is also a dedicated toy known as a rocket balloon, usually tubular-shaped and inflated with a special pump (pictured). These balloons, when released, propel in a more stable direction because of a steadier thrust of air and elongated shape, unlike ordinary round balloons, which often launch uncontrollably.

Aside from the shape, rocket balloons are also characterized by their distinctive loud buzzing or screaming noises due to the tight, reed-like opening designed to make noise as the air rushes through.

They are also known as noisemaker balloons, due to the aforementioned noise

== As cartoon gags ==
The fact that an untied toy balloon flies away when released sometimes has become a staple recurring gag and comedic effect in most cartoons.

For instance, when an object or a character is comically being "inflated" and then deflates, it flies away uncontrollably, in a similar fashion to a balloon itself.

In addition, the noises that a balloon creates when deflating is sometimes used in conjunction with this comedic effect.
