= 3rd FAI Women's World Hot Air Balloon Championship =

World Hot Air Ballooning Championships for women

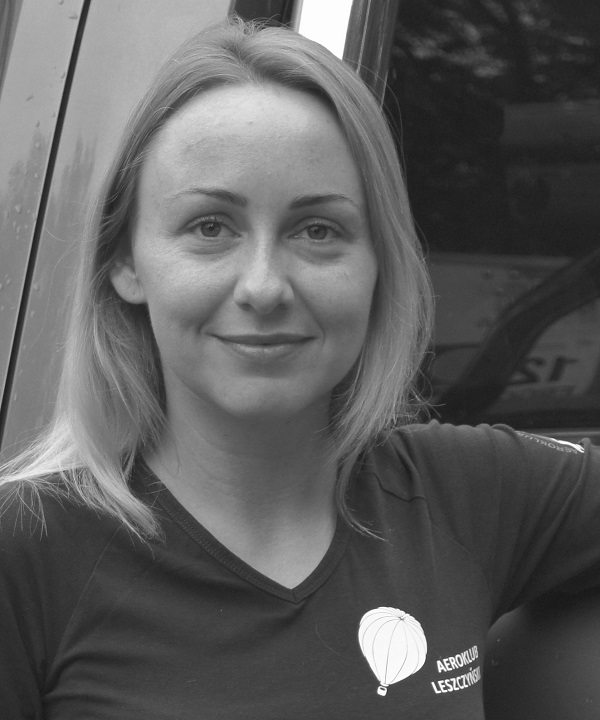
- Daria Dudkiewicz-Golawska
- Location: Nałęczów, Poland
- Start date: August 6, 2018
- End date: August 11, 2018
- Competitors: 33 from 14 nations

Champion
- (Poland) Daria Dudkiewicz-Golawska

3rd FAI Women's World Hot Air Balloon Championship was 3rd edition of World Hot Air Ballooning Championships for women held in Nałęczów, Poland from August 6 to August 11, 2018. Total of 14 tasks were held. Five flights were cancelled due to the weather conditions from August 9 to August 11.

Daria Dudkiewicz-Golawska from Leszno, Poland became world champion. Nicola Scaife, the world champion of 2014 and 2016 from Hunter Valley, Australia was third.

== Final ranking ==
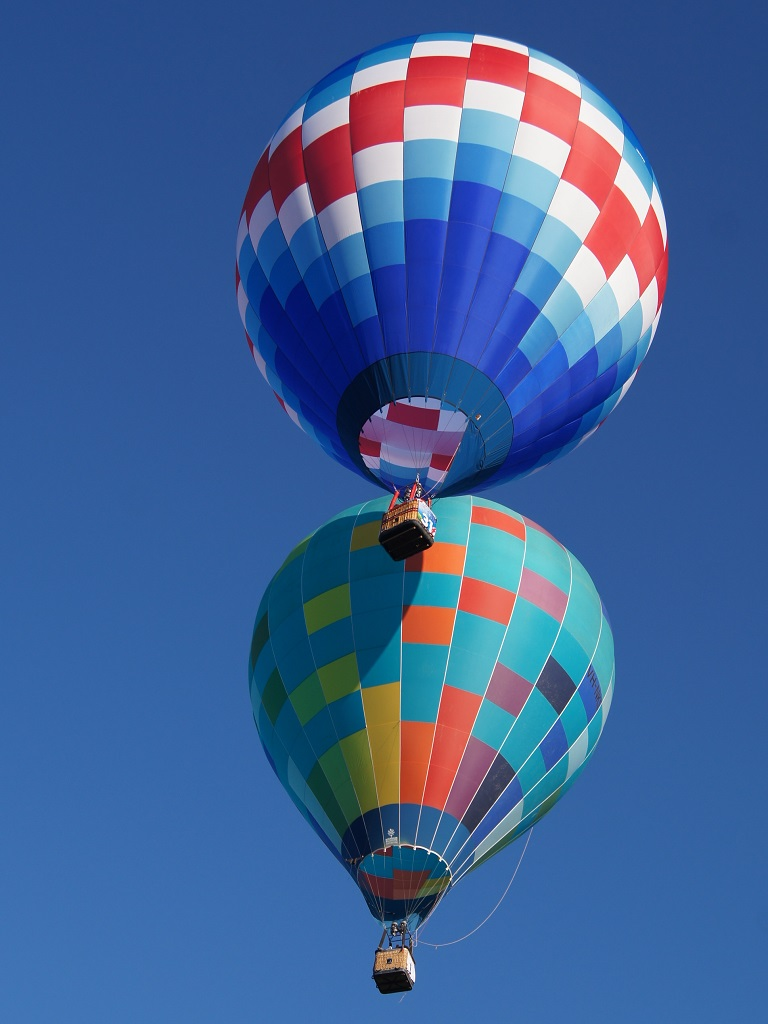
Scaife (AUS) and Keller (USA, blue balloon) competing at task 11

Rank	Balloonist	Nation	Points	Wins
1st place, gold medalist(s)	Daria Dudkiewicz-Golawska	Poland	10875	2
2nd place, silver medalist(s)	Agnė Simonavičiūtė	Lithuania	9663	1
3rd place, bronze medalist(s)	Nicola Scaife	Australia	9287	4
4	Kim Magee	United States	9048	0
5	Elisabeth Kindermann-Schön	Austria	8976	1
6	Julija Romanovskaja	Lithuania	8788	3
7	Cheri White	United States	8319	0
8	Astrid Carl	Germany	8295	0
9	Nicole Vogel	Switzerland	8269	0
10	Rita Becz	Hungary	7987	0
11	Sanne Haarhuis	Netherlands	7946	0
12	Kristin Vevere	Latvia	7752	0
13	Chloe Hallet	United Kingdom	7568	1
14	Beata Choma	Poland	7351	0
15	Joanna Biedermann	Poland	7306	2
16	Miglė Vaitulevičiūtė	Lithuania	7100	0
17	Diana Nasonova	Russia	7056	0
18	Kelli Keller	United States	7032	0
19	Katharina Kräck	Germany	6872	0
20	Lindsay Muir	United Kingdom	6581	0
21	Ieva Skele	Latvia	6411	1
22	Marija Oparina	Russia	6408	0
23	Sylvia Meinl	Germany	6174	0
24	Marija Petric Miklousic	Croatia	6094	0
25	Ewelina Leszczuk	Poland	5947	0
26	Caroline Splinters	Netherlands	5869	0
27	Akari Sue	Japan	5839	0
28	Ieva Šuopytė	Lithuania	5677	0
29	Aline Kalousdian	Germany	5161	0
30	Mia Fraser	Australia	5160	0
31	Victoria Vertrees	United States	4484	0
32	Tomoko Kurahashi	Japan	4395	0
33	Rieko Shingo	Japan	3473	0
