= 2021 European Hot Air Balloon Championship =

Hot Air Balloon competition

- Venue: Szeged Airport
- Location: Szeged, Hungary
- Dates: 13 – 17 September
- Competitors: 81 from 23 nations

The 22nd FAI European Hot Air Balloon Championship was held from 13 to 17 September 2021 in Szeged, Hungary. Happened exactly 210 years ago, on June 3, 1811, that the first hot air balloon flew in Hungary for the first time. It was the first time that an Armenian hot air balloon pilot participated at a European Championship.

== Results ==
Rank	Pilot	From	Total	Tasks																		
Rank	Pilot	From	Total	1	2	3	4	5	6	7	8	9	10	11	12	13	14	15	16	17	18	19
1st place, gold medalist(s)	Hugi Roman	Switzerland	14320	797	600	897	1000	803	1000	951	901	428	774	956	296	860	111	634	1000	762	746	804
2nd place, silver medalist(s)	Stefan Zeberli	Switzerland	14048	652	564	969	395	527	788	1000	888	444	649	136	960	1000	672	707	1000	935	816	946
3rd place, bronze medalist(s)	David Spildooren	Belgium	14021	964	741	856	229	407	853	819	975	730	901	678	136	659	922	1000	913	803	929	506
4	Jean-Philippe Odouard	France	13131	571	663	969	358	772	570	623	701	617	432	623	840	574	855	579	985	795	729	875
5	Thomas Kindermann-Schön	Austria	12702	407	407	1000	621	813	977	925	920	712	123	943	964	160	795	634	438	738	506	619
6	Sven Göhler	Germany	12664	998	521	732	444	568	717	811	795	761	506	955	880	514	488	272	855	720	769	358
7	Roman Bauta	Poland	12578	170	321	630	536	801	656	506	830	930	284	688	974	802	949	616	593	651	659	982
8	Steven Vlegels	Belgium	12548	993	715	86	632	528	869	864	528	879	859	624	741	160	996	1000	753	618	530	173
9	Kenneth Karlstrom	Great Britain	12476	712	646	547	545	358	506	321	377	670	961	924	891	906	854	744	535	395	709	875
10	Petr Kubíček	Czech Republic	12435	67	62	949	567	738	750	860	548	147	272	880	917	904	928	652	811	957	1000	426
11	Tomasz Filus	Poland	12235	222	123	506	551	530	860	955	444	784	910	1000	557	951	892	982	956	494	209	309
12	Nicolas Schwartz	France	12212	566	596	702	603	526	457	646	995	321	986	743	309	358	931	945	724	625	896	283
13	Vito Rome	Slovenia	12178	558	506	99	514	578	725	913	1000	469	346	136	847	910	806	799	830	526	842	774
14	Rokas Kostiuškevičius	Lithuania	12100	1000	685	835	272	525	420	457	974	333	821	333	765	692	638	389	1000	837	803	321
15	Mateusz Rękas	Poland	12061	383	494	846	514	198	948	913	333	544	618	949	235	989	535	689	395	1000	567	911
16	Clément Seigeot	France	11990	708	641	877	564	210	917	897	904	866	173	358	844	943	136	872	797	97	210	976
17	Roman Savchuk	Ukraine	11968	1000	370	671	432	999	766	333	506	284	481	982	148	381	945	963	826	370	606	905
18	Laurynas Komža	Lithuania	11932	831	973	722	553	451	597	781	905	780	576	136	801	160	540	597	564	630	752	583
19	Uwe Schneider	Germany	11930	823	702	284	340	535	622	891	977	574	887	975	278	984	159	762	608	685	622	222
20	Dominic Bareford	Great Britain	11836	688	915	784	566	309	828	597	886	235	862	136	395	160	567	780	481	957	750	940
21	Martin Wegner	Germany	11492	844	662	537	469	551	588	346	321	481	370	895	865	780	934	854	855	591	123	426
22	David Strasmann	Germany	11428	550	444	235	502	432	494	732	915	992	869	766	911	997	99	1000	148	49	680	613
23	Pavel Kostrhun	Czech Republic	11383	358	746	640	544	537	691	481	929	160	494	346	129	856	910	854	506	556	878	768
24	Marc Blaser	Switzerland	11356	887	481	123	49	608	876	913	671	903	803	977	521	902	432	401	49	538	633	589
25	Laure de Coligny	France	11324	803	839	712	610	451	876	736	870	633	259	792	432	160	171	524	407	545	665	839
26	Evgeny Chubarov	Russia	11153	647	463	488	574	395	550	630	185	494	786	942	858	999	943	451	117	469	222	940
27	Helmut Pöttler	Austria	11083	278	684	148	527	991	747	1000	888	737	210	136	659	160	928	945	160	598	507	780
28	Henk Broeders	Netherlands	11050	774	683	949	210	222	123	781	622	346	738	939	883	956	160	198	855	346	420	845
29	Benjamin Cleyet-Marrel	France	10961	951	1000	712	508	185	432	1000	896	136	444	742	123	160	457	506	927	702	395	685
30	David Línek	Czech Republic	10936	309	688	630	0	809	25	634	712	680	592	912	840	982	937	634	333	577	370	272
31	Iván Ayala	Spain	10795	506	629	488	284	820	469	74	847	902	863	627	980	457	506	216	724	451	717	235
32	Bartosz Nowakowski	Poland	10780	62	185	743	511	148	889	951	290	711	709	714	781	899	395	451	753	173	897	518
33	Ricardo Aracil Romero	Spain	10652	541	491	671	321	558	611	148	933	1000	565	383	976	858	516	284	782	217	346	451
34	Vytas Kerdokas	Lithuania	10579	852	625	370	506	46	604	222	99	804	951	519	879	370	893	420	768	481	746	-76
35	Alexis Béjat	France	10427	432	432	74	457	806	554	272	457	210	111	632	987	908	917	634	666	658	535	685
36	Tadas Gegevičius	Lithuania	10414	999	728	160	538	1000	594	581	235	700	247	989	811	160	25	62	826	284	737	738
37	Dmitriy Zhokhov	Russia	10354	457	723	794	627	469	394	989	932	358	457	432	506	656	358	296	782	111	754	259
38	Pascal Kreins	Germany	10332	948	689	173	395	565	598	525	469	506	756	494	222	671	604	616	869	787	198	247
39	Roy Gommer	Netherlands	10327	713	711	537	522	86	296	547	908	951	682	936	259	815	444	389	321	420	494	296
40	Jernej Bojanovič	Slovenia	10202	633	463	959	148	272	160	444	247	632	74	990	481	701	641	389	956	562	640	810
41	Rimas Kostiuškevičius	Lithuania	10185	801	704	346	494	494	543	395	309	621	699	961	420	160	803	762	469	417	296	491
42	René Erni	Switzerland	9955	602	333	681	583	481	370	247	377	259	935	136	1000	432	307	235	859	629	739	750
43	Witold Filus	Poland	9788	235	309	568	577	822	783	585	933	357	469	899	99	494	74	597	37	272	827	851
44	Gian-Marco Nacht	Switzerland	9530	704	549	856	541	327	185	309	173	640	321	849	825	346	62	86	724	675	358	1000
45	Andrey Kulkov	Russia	9443	321	210	887	555	880	753	185	272	395	358	656	160	667	989	1000	99	587	185	284
46	Bastian Schwarz	Germany	9414	966	773	609	561	539	851	259	234	370	716	284	37	160	198	616	724	653	469	395
47	Martin Pagger	Austria	9319	278	510	198	519	37	998	721	780	222	603	629	723	160	853	982	148	383	235	340
48	Kim Larsen	Denmark	9294	247	235	469	526	528	198	687	377	897	309	136	617	964	346	259	709	321	659	810
49	Cédric Gauch	Switzerland	9190	444	198	835	760	420	309	1000	111	752	723	395	964	160	309	148	222	656	333	451
50	Jan Suchý	Czech Republic	9139	111	99	31	481	839	481	725	950	913	407	801	383	930	599	358	377	49	457	148
51	Igor Mikloušić	Croatia	9134	86	148	537	544	741	25	407	873	309	395	136	928	631	969	309	898	717	444	37
52	János Konecsni	Hungary	9083	494	346	333	111	370	148	894	222	666	944	136	902	547	179	744	786	49	652	560
53	Michael Abel	Austria	8715	758	599	31	596	591	856	296	912	763	683	136	494	160	37	136	438	710	309	210
54	Evert Dehandschutter	Belgium	8683	587	296	296	173	247	333	623	210	717	616	296	179	160	950	1000	768	457	37	738
55	Thomas Spildooren	Belgium	8406	999	605	222	247	111	25	198	481	624	420	321	407	160	981	1000	506	247	383	469
56	Óscar Portillo Feliu	Spain	8017	973	638	712	0	526	346	123	-89	688	533	951	74	160	801	506	210	178	675	12
57	Christophe Betzen	Luxembourg	7982	333	680	784	229	235	173	62	775	657	333	431	370	898	981	12	259	596	247	-73
58	Christoph Fraisl	Austria	7887	469	420	185	86	762	991	747	540	86	86	407	247	420	247	74	296	333	586	905
59	Blai Carbonell Rodríguez	Spain	7850	582	514	619	395	549	345	136	377	681	198	786	198	444	438	835	74	49	432	198
60	Péter Molnár	Hungary	7757	173	160	259	123	284	321	364	980	933	997	444	49	160	358	111	309	584	741	407
61	Dejan Buzeti	Slovenia	7745	98	222	420	185	539	99	25	881	821	185	586	856	752	863	481	160	444	48	80
62	Szabolcs Garab	Hungary	7739	123	111	432	539	346	136	778	945	173	160	136	902	554	333	340	913	657	99	62
63	Pavel Měřínský	Czech Republic	7701	192	247	650	420	99	407	432	968	432	136	136	271	469	272	524	377	289	713	667
64	Jan Oudenampsen	Netherlands	7658	346	551	272	533	296	86	160	494	383	333	370	786	949	179	123	198	663	49	887
65	Maksym Demchuk	Ukraine	7416	1000	571	407	511	25	222	173	49	12	296	980	444	407	962	963	86	123	25	160
66	Vytautas Junevičius	Lithuania	7097	613	675	321	259	123	745	420	148	569	148	136	469	160	123	451	782	99	136	720
67	Kaspars Stamurs	Latvia	7022	481	389	395	621	136	210	25	377	420	712	506	62	947	284	216	352	432	272	185
68	Gerald Stürzlinger	Austria	6965	296	272	247	340	540	383	235	123	99	99	272	945	717	469	321	92	173	854	488
69	Bojan Kugler	Croatia	6834	49	74	572	550	49	247	99	290	457	940	136	25	321	420	389	709	210	321	976
70	Rune Tore Paamand	Denmark	6679	99	136	111	571	537	395	755	62	198	1000	136	900	160	49	173	608	259	160	370
71	Pat Pruchnickyj	Great Britain	6340	210	284	309	25	511	986	111	432	123	738	136	278	538	321	340	259	148	551	40
72	Beata Choma	Poland	6300	259	358	457	136	506	259	364	198	62	235	731	358	160	210	579	352	-39	407	708
73	Kristīne Vēvere	Latvia	6211	160	86	640	99	74	134	25	377	296	801	209	333	160	549	744	457	506	481	80
74	Guido Montemurro	Italy	5603	555	389	444	160	259	358	284	136	49	222	395	346	395	370	49	247	85	62	798
75	Marián Hraňo	Slovakia	4934	136	835	136	12	383	49	383	74	148	539	136	111	506	235	160	272	49	74	696
76	Raffaele Moscara	Italy	4240	74	37	31	62	12	111	808	420	135	25	136	457	160	849	817	37	5	259	-195
77	Igor Charbonnier	Italy	4194	19	173	358	309	160	235	210	-367	0	517	457	960	383	48	25	0	49	658	0
78	Pavol Gomboš	Slovakia	4113	420	259	210	198	327	636	56	7	37	49	136	791	333	222	185	0	136	86	25
79	Nairi Barseghyan	Armenia	4057	395	12	31	508	173	272	49	25	111	62	444	210	160	987	99	0	309	111	99
80	Ieva Šķēle	Latvia	4038	19	49	62	74	542	74	494	656	272	37	136	86	160	86	37	136	296	12	810
81	Claus Thomsen	Denmark	2085	37	25	358	37	62	62	469	86	74	12	136	0	160	12	247	0	49	173	86
Checksums				4586	0547	7715	3245	5339	1616	0420	2330	9470	5432	0407	5716	9276	4446	5000	5748	6251	7452	1735

== Nation Ranking ==
Rank	Nation
1st place, gold medalist(s)	France
2nd place, silver medalist(s)	Switzerland
3rd place, bronze medalist(s)	Germany
4	Belgium
5	Poland
6	Lithuania
7	Czech Republic
8	Russia
9	Great Britain
10	Slovenia
