= Gintarė =

- Gender: female

Origin
- Origin: Lithuanian
- Meaning: gintaras = amber

Other names
- Related names: Gintaras

Gintarė is a Lithuanian feminine name. It is the feminine form of Gintaras. It may refer to:

- Gintarė Adomaitytė (born 1957), Lithuanian journalist
- Gintarė Bražaitė (born 1992), Lithuanian weightlifter and coach
- Gintarė Gaivenytė (born 1986), Lithuanian racing cyclist
- Gintarė Jautakaitė (born 1958), Lithuanian singer
- Gintarė Petronytė (born 1989), Lithuanian basketball player
- Gintarė Scheidt (born 1982), Lithuanian dinghy sailor
- Gintarė Skaistė (born 1981), Lithuanian politician
- Gintarė Venčkauskaitė (born 1992), Lithuanian modern pentathlete
- Gintarė Vostrecovaitė (born 1986), Lithuanian figure skater
