= 2014 Women's World Hot Air Balloon Championships =

1st FAI Women's World Hot Air Balloon Championship
- Location: Leszno, Poland
- Start date: September 8, 2014
- End date: September 13, 2014
- Competitors: 38 from 16 nations

Champion
- (Australia) Nicola Scaife

2014 Women's World Hot Air Balloon Championships was 1st edition of World Hot Air Ballooning Championships for women held in Leszno, Poland from September 8 to September 13, 2014. Total of 16 tasks were held.

== Final ranking ==
Rank	Balloonist	Nation	Points	Wins
1st place, gold medalist(s)	Nicola Scaife	Australia	12489	3
2nd place, silver medalist(s)	Elisabeth Kindermann	Austria	12401	1
3rd place, bronze medalist(s)	Agnė Simonavičiūtė	Lithuania	11362	0
4	Dolores Deimling	Germany	10881	1
5	Elise Kloss	Germany	10837	2
6	Daiva Rakauskaitė	Lithuania	10647	0
7	Mariya Sadkovskaya	Russia	10462	1
8	Nicole Vogel	Switzerland	10455	0
9	Ann Herdewyn	Belgium	10110	0
10	Akari Sue	Japan	10106	1
11	Rita Becz	Hungary	10081	0
12	Sylvia Meinl	Germany	10076	2
13	Beata Choma	Poland	9587	0
14	Daria Dudkiewicz	Poland	9540	1
15	Ekaterina Larikova	Russia	9384	0
16	Kristina Sūnaitienė	Lithuania	9143	0
17	Ewa Prawicka-Linke	Poland	9043	1
18	Rita Naujelienė	Lithuania	8777	0
19	Marketa Olsanova	Czech Republic	8761	0
20	Meg Skelton	United States	8615	0
21	Astrid Carl	Germany	8395	0
22	Sanne Haarhuis	Netherlands	8356	0
23	Debby Young	United States	8112	0
24	Diana Nasonova	Russia	7973	1
25	Nataliia Ivanova	Russia	7956	1
26	Ewelina Helak	Poland	7649	0
27	Marija Miklousic	Croatia	7026	0
28	Julia Selezneva	Russia	7022	0
29	Susan Stamats	United States	6880	1
30	Christine Bertsch	United States	6731	0
31	Janet Haase	Switzerland	6030	0
32	Kelli Cook	United States	5976	0
33	Tomoko Kurahashi	Japan	5940	0
34	Joanna Biedermann	Poland	5773	0
35	Lindsay Muir	Great Britain	5756	0
36	Mary-Anne Stevens	Canada	5377	0
37	Rieko Shingo	Japan	4477	0
38	Karin Cyrol	Germany	4100	0
