= Lindsay Muir (balloonist) =

British balloonist

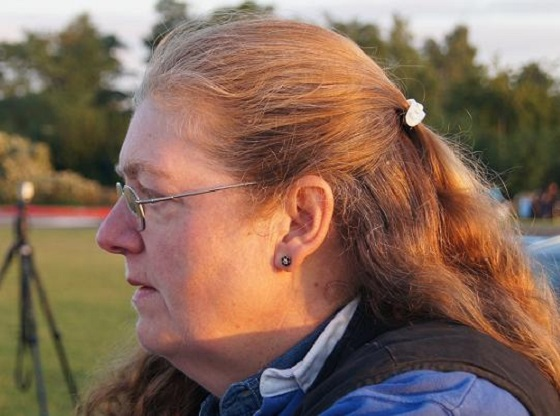
- Muir in Frankenthal, 2012

Personal information
- Born: 21 June 1957 (age 69)
Medal record
Hot air ballooning
Representing Great Britain
Women's European Championship
Silver medal – second place	2010 Alytus	Women's Overall
Gold medal – first place	2012 Frankenthal	Women's Overall
British Championships
Gold medal – first place	1988	Overall
Gold medal – first place	1996	Overall
World Air Games
Silver medal – second place	1997	Overall
FAI World Cup
Gold medal – first place	1991	Women's Overall
Gold medal – first place	1992	Women's Overall
Gold medal – first place	1993	Women's Overall
Gold medal – first place	1996	Women's Overall

Lindsay Muir (born 21 June 1957) is a British female balloonist and FAI world record holder, who became European champion in 2012.

In 2010 Muir won silver at 1st FAI Women's European Championships in Alytus, Lithuania. Two years later she became European Champion at the second event in Frankenthal, Germany. She also participated in 1995 12th FAI World Hot Air Ballooning Championships where she finished 6th in open gender classification.

== Life ==
Muir began flying in 1983 and earned her private Pilot’s Certificate on 21 November 1983, the 200th anniversary of aviation. Later she moved on to become a Commercial Pilot. Since 1989, she has participated in FAI World and European Championships, where for many years she has regularly been the only woman.

On 21 May 2000 Muir set a women's world record in the class AX-10 (hot air balloons from 4000 to 6000 m^{3}). After 19 hours 7 minutes and 55 seconds heavy weather forced her to land. The record was still unbroken 15 years later.

Muir is married to Graham Hallett, chief technical officer of the British Balloon and Airship Club. Their daughter Chloe Hallet is participating in the FAI competitions since 2015, when she was the youngest British balloon pilot at the age of 17. In March 2015, Muir was elected vice president of the CIA (Commission Internationale d'Aérostation) the FAI's ballooning commission).

== Competition record ==
=== World Championships ===
- 12th FAI World Championship in Battle Creek, Michigan, USA, 1995 – 6th (overall)
- 1st FAI Women’s World Hot Air Balloon Championship in Leszno, Poland, 2014 – 35th
- 2nd FAI Women's World Hot Air Balloon Championship in Birštonas, Lithuania, 2016 – 21st
- 3rd FAI Women's World Hot Air Balloon Championship in Nałęczów, Poland, 2018 – 20th

=== European Championships ===
- 1st FAI Women’s European Hot Air Balloon Championship in Alytus, Lithuania, 2010 – Vice European Champion
- 2nd FAI Women’s European Hot Air Balloon Championship in Frankenthal, Germany, 2012 – European Champion
- 3rd FAI Women’s European Hot Air Balloon Championship in Orvelte/Drenthe, Netherlands, 2015 – 12th
- 4th FAI Women’s European Hot Air Balloon Championship in Leszno, Poland, 2017 – 4th

=== British Championships (wins only) ===
- Championship 1996 – 1st (overall)
- Championship 1988 – 1st (overall)

=== FAI Women's World Cup (wins only) ===
- World Cup 1991 – 1st
- World Cup 1992 – 1st
- World Cup 1993 – 1st
- World Cup 1996 – 1st

=== World Air Games ===
- World Air Games 1997 – 2nd in hot air ballooning

== Links and sources ==
- Fédération Aéronautique Internationale: 21 MAY 2000: THE STORY OF LINDSAY MUIR'S HOT AIR BALLOON WORLD RECORD.
- Lindsay Muir.
