= 2014 World Hot Air Balloon Championships =

21st FAI World Hot Air Balloon Championship
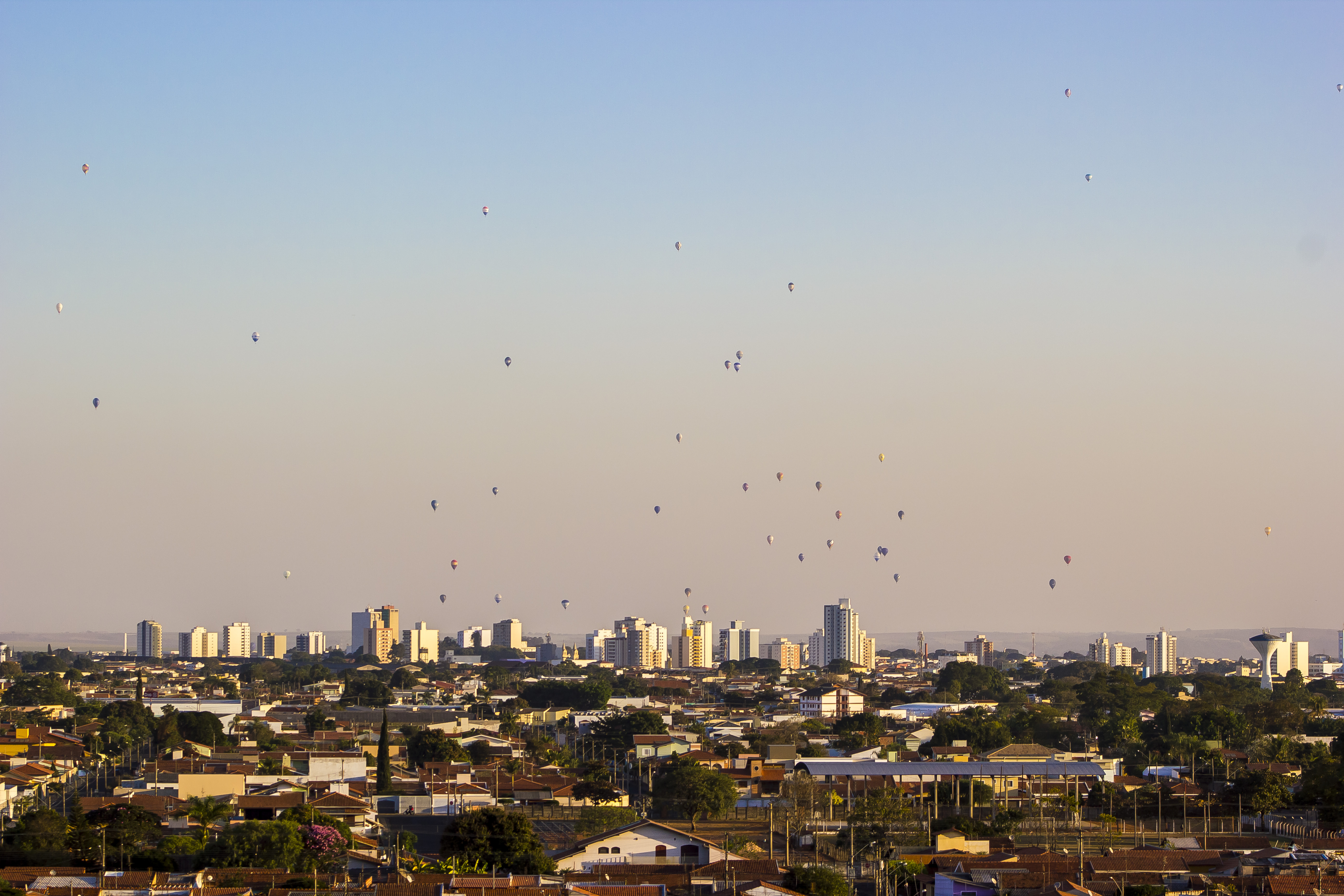
- Location: Rio Claro, São Paulo, Brazil
- Start date: July 17, 2014
- End date: July 27, 2014
- Competitors: 58 from 22 nations

Champion
- (Japan) Yudai Fujita

2014 World Hot Air Balloon Championships was 21st edition of World Hot Air Ballooning Championships held in Rio Claro, São Paulo, Brazil from July 17 to July 27, 2014. It was a first time when championships were held in South America. Total of 23 tasks were held.

== Final ranking ==
Top 20

Rank	Balloonist	Nation	Points	Wins
1st place, gold medalist(s)	Yudai Fujita	Japan	17443	3
2nd place, silver medalist(s)	Uwe Schneider	Germany	16216	0
3rd place, bronze medalist(s)	Lupercio Lima	Brazil	16064	1
4	Stefan Zeberli	Switzerland	15867	1
5	Rimas Kostiuškevičius	Lithuania	15173	1
6	Gerald Stuerzlinger	Austria	15130	0
7	Artem Denisenko	Russia	15096	1
8	Joe Heartsill	United States	15092	0
9	Rokas Kostiuškevičius	Lithuania	15002	0
10	Rhett Heartsill	United States	14717	1
11	Marc Blaser	Switzerland	14587	0
12	Andy Baird	United States	14584	0
13	Paul Petrehn	United States	14548	2
14	Sergey Latypov	Russia	14508	0
15	Nico Betzen	Luxembourg	14066	0
16	Tod Isley	United States	13993	1
17	Fabio Passos	Brazil	13845	1
18	Nicolas Schwartz	France	13578	1
19	Alexander Dultsev	Russia	13439	0
20	Jose-Maria Llado	Spain	13432	0
