= Gintautas =

Gintautas (pronounced [ˈɡʲɪntɐʊtɐs]) is a Lithuanian masculine given name and surname. It is derived from the Lithuanian roots "ginti" (to defend, protect) and "tauta" (nation, people). Gintas is used as a shortening for Gintautas, as well as for Gintaras and various other given names.

Notable people with this given name include:

- Gintautas Bartkus (born 1966), Lithuanian lawyer and politician
- Gintautas Iešmantas (1930–2016), Lithuanian politician
- Gintautas Matulis (b. 1986), Lithuanian basketball player and manager
- Gintautas Mikolaitis (b. 1959), Lithuanian engineer and politician
- Gintautas Paluckas (b. 1979), Lithuanian politician
- Gintautas Piešina (1952–2014), Lithuanian chess player
- Gintautas Šulija (b. 1978), Lithuanian Attorney at law
- Gintautas Umaras (b. 1963), Lithuanian track and road racing cyclist
