= Agnė Simonavičiūtė =

Lithuanian balloonist

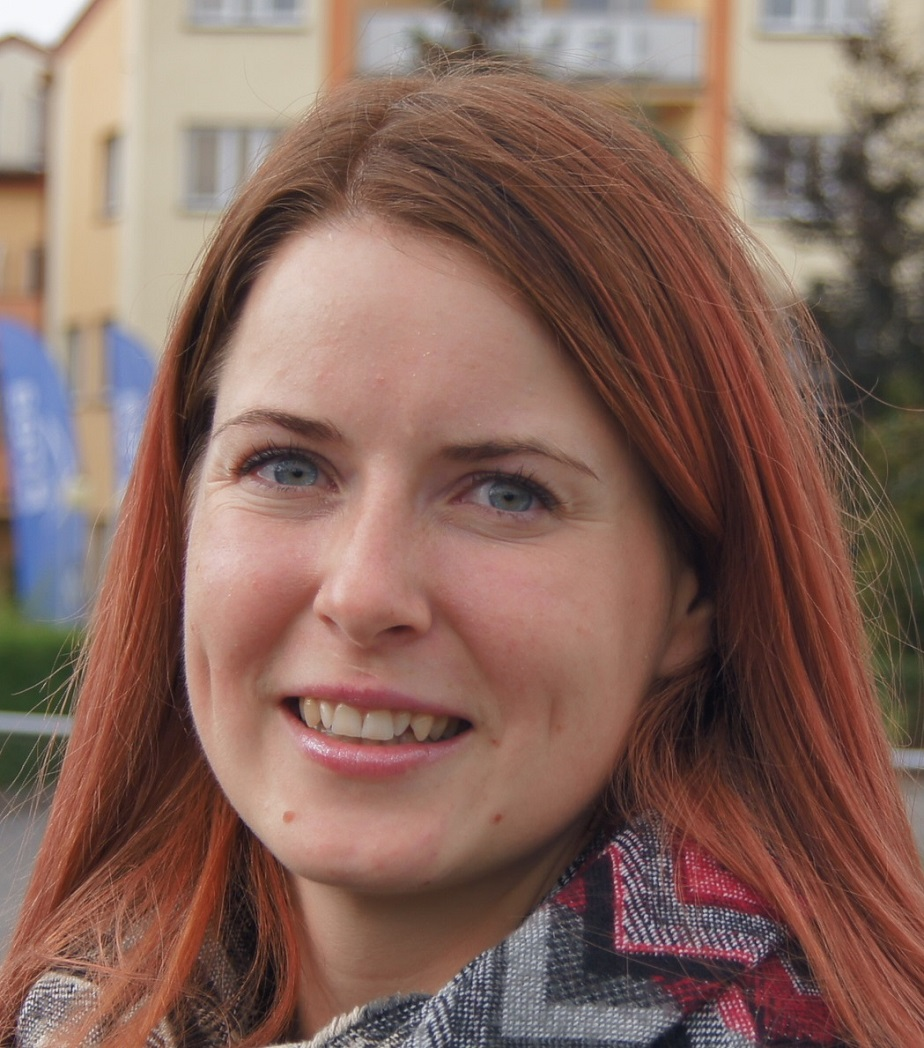
- Simonavičiūtė in Leszno, 2017

Personal information
- Born: 1995 (age 30–31)
Medal record
Hot air ballooning
Representing Lithuania
Women's World Championship
Bronze medal – third place	2014 Leszno	Women's Overall
Silver medal – second place	2018 Nałęczów	Women's Overall
Women's European Championship
Silver medal – second place	2017 Leszno	Women's Overall

Agnė Simonavičiūtė is a Lithuanian female balloonist and FAI women's vice world champion.

In 2014 Simonavičiūtė won bronze at 1st FAI Women's World Championships in Leszno, Poland. In 2017 Simonavičiūtė won silver at 4th FAI Women's World Championships in Leszno. In 2018 she won silver at 3rd FAI Women's World Hot Air Balloon Championship in Nałęczów, Poland.

She also participated in 2014 2nd FAI World Junior Hot Air Ballooning Championships where she finished 14th in open gender classification.
