= European Hot Air Balloon Championships =

The European Hot Air Balloon Championships are the FAI European Hot Air Balloon Championship and the FAI Women's European Hot Air Balloon Championship. These biennial events for hot air ballooning are conducted under the direction of the FAI Ballooning Commission (C.I.A. or Comité International d'Aérostation).

== FAI European Hot Air Balloon Championship ==
Year	City	Country	Date	Winners	No. of Athletes
1976	Skövde	Sweden	14 - 18 April	(gold) Simon Faithful (NED); (silver) Wilf Woollett (IRE); (bronze) Axel Madsen (SWE)	32
1980	Arc-et-Senans	France	10 - 13 October	(gold) Josef Starkbaum (AUT); (silver) Patrice Terrin (FRA); (bronze) Mathijs de Bruijn (NED)	25
1982	Ettelbruck	Luxembourg		(gold) Josef Starkbaum (AUT); (silver) Mathijs de Bruijn (NED); (bronze) Henning Sørensen (DEN)	41
1984	Castle Howard	Great Britain	27 - 31 August	(gold) Victor Trimble (GBR); (silver) Tomás Feliú (ESP); (bronze) David Bareford (GBR)	38
1986	Stubenberg	Austria	14 - 19 September	(gold) Martin Messner (SUI); (silver) Ian Bridge (GBR); (bronze) Mathijs de Bruijn (NED)	53
1988	Leszno	Poland	4 - 9 September	(gold) David Bareford (GBR); (silver) Mathijs de Bruijn (NED); (bronze) Uwe Schneider (FRG)	60
1990	Lleida	Spain	8 - 15 September	(gold) Csaba Molnar (HUN); (silver) Uwe Schneider (FRG); (bronze) Bengt Gunnarsson (SWE)	54
1992	Belfort	France		(gold) Uwe Schneider (GER); (silver) Benedikt Haggeney (GER); (bronze) Hans Kordel (GER)	70
1994	Murska Sobota	Slovenia	12 - 17 September	(gold) Jean-Marie Huttois (FRA); (silver) Uwe Schneider (GER); (bronze) Claude Sauber (LUX)	56
1996	Schielleiten	Austria		(gold) David Bareford (GBR); (silver) Claude Sauber (LUX); (bronze) Miklos Kardos (HUN)	80
1998	Katrineholm	Sweden	20 - 27 June	(gold) Stéphane Bolze (FRA); (silver) Peter Blaser (SUI); (bronze) Uwe Schneider (GER)	77
2000	Larochette	Luxembourg	5 - 13 August	(gold) David Bareford (GBR); (silver) François Messines (FRA); (bronze) Josf Scherzer (AUT)	79
2003	Vilnius	Lithuania		(gold) Uwe Schneider (GER); (silver) Sándor Vegh (HUN); (bronze) Jan Timmers (BEL)	68
2005	Debrecen	Hungary	23 - 28 May	(gold) Uwe Schneider (GER); (silver) Zoltán Nemeth (HUN); (bronze) Josep María Llado (ESP)	81
2007	Magdeburg	Germany	17 – 26 August	(gold) François Messines (FRA); (silver) Uwe Schneider (GER); (bronze) Markus Pieper (GER)	79
2009	Brissac	France	21 – 29 August	(gold) Stefan Zeberli (SUI); (silver) François Messines (FRA); (bronze) Richard Parry (GBR)	83
2011	Lleida	Spain	15 – 23 September	(gold) Stefan Zeberli (SUI); (silver) Iván Ayala (ESP); (bronze) David Bareford (GBR)	77
2013	Włocławek	Poland	6 – 14 September	(gold) Rokas Kostiuškevičius (LTU); (silver) Rimas Kostiuškevičius (LTU); (bronze) Iván Ayala (ESP)	81
2015	Debrecen	Hungary	11 – 18 August	(gold) Stefan Zeberli (SUI); (silver) Sven Goehler (GER); (bronze) Vito Rome (SLO)	96
2017	Brissac	France	21 – 27 August	(gold) Stefan Zeberli (SUI); (silver) Sergey Latypov (RUS); (bronze) Roman Hugi (SUI)	82
2019	Mallorca	Spain	22 - 27 October	(gold) Stefan Zeberli (SUI); (silver) Laurynas Komža (LTU); (bronze) Nicolas Schwartz (FRA)	83
2021	Szeged	Hungary	13 - 17 September	(gold) Roman Hugi (SUI); (silver) Stefan Zeberli (SUI); (bronze) David Spildooren (BEL)	84
2025	Wieselburg-Land	Austria	17 - 22 August	(gold) Stefan Zeberli (SUI); (silver) Dominic Bareford (GBR); (bronze) David Strasmann (SUI)	82

== FAI Women's European Hot Air Balloon Championship ==
Year	City	Country	Date	Winners	No. of Athletes
2010	Alytus	Lithuania	15–20 June	(gold) Gabriela Slavec (SLO); (silver) Lindsay Muir (GBR); (bronze) Jolanta Matejczuk (POL)	27
2012	Frankenthal	Germany	18–22 September	(gold) Lindsay Muir (GBR); (silver) Daiva Rakauskaitė (LTU); (bronze) Ann Herdewyn (BEL)	25
2015	Orvelte/Drenthe	Netherlands	14–19 September	(gold) Ewa Prawicka-Linke (POL); (silver) Daiva Rakauskaitė (LTU); (bronze) Elisabeth Kindermann (AUT)	30
2017	Leszno	Poland	5–9 September	(gold) Beata Choma (POL); (silver) Agnė Simonavičiūtė (LTU); (bronze) Elisabeth Kindermann (AUT)	28

== See also ==
- World Hot Air Ballooning Championships
- World Junior Hot Air Ballooning Championships
