= Daiva Rakauskaitė =

Lithuanian balloonist

Medal record

Hot Air Ballooning

Representing Lithuania

European Championships
Silver medal – second place	2012 Frankenthal	Women's Overall
Silver medal – second place	2015 Drenthe	Women's Overall

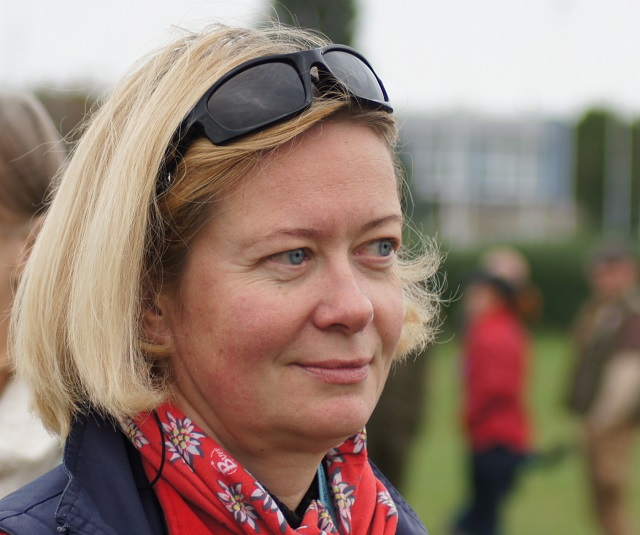
Daiva Rakauskaitė, Leszno 2017

Daiva Rakauskaitė is a Lithuanian female balloonist.

In 2010 1st European Women's Championships in Alytus, Lithuania Rakauskaitė finished in 13th place. In 2012 and 2015 Rakauskaitė won silver at 2nd FAI Women's European Championships in Frankenthal, Germany and at 3rd Women's European Championships in Drenthe, Netherlands. In 2014 1st FAI Women's World Championships she finished 6th.
