= Gabriela Slavec =

Slovenian female ballooning athlete

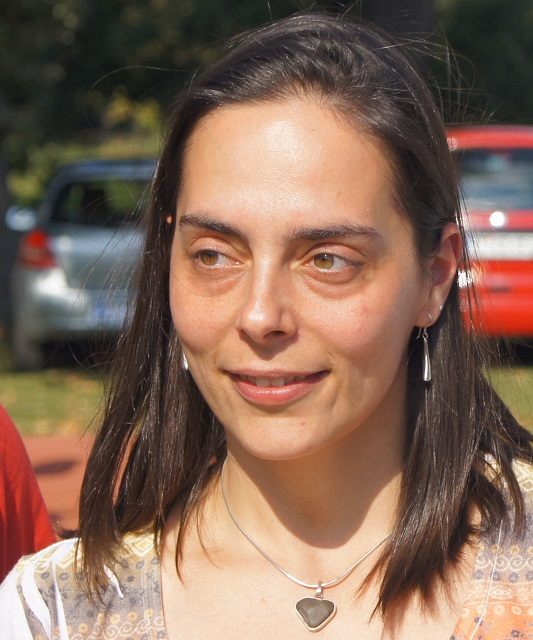
- Slavec in Frankenthal, 2012
Medal record
Hot air ballooning
Representing Slovenia
Women's European Championship
Gold medal – first place	2010 Alytus	Women's Overall

Gabriela Slavec is a Slovenian female ballooning athlete, who became European Champion in 2010.

In 2010 Slavec won gold at 1st FAI Women's European Championships in Alytus, Lithuania. Two years later she started with the number "1" at the second event in Frankenthal where she finished 8th.

Slavec is married, a mother and lives in Brazil.

== Competition record ==
=== European Championships ===
- 1st FAI Women's European Hot Air Balloon Championship in Alytus, Lithuania, 2010 – European Champion
- 2nd FAI Women's European Hot Air Balloon Championship in Frankenthal, Germany, 2012 – 8th
