= Nicola Scaife =

Australian hot air balloonist

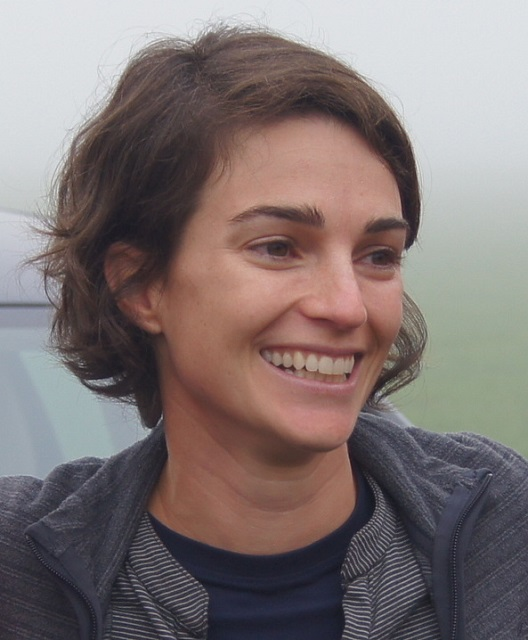
- Scaife in Leszno, 2014

Personal information
- Born: 1984 or 1985 (age 41–42) Albury, New South Wales, Australia
Medal record
Hot air ballooning
Representing Australia
Women's World Championship
Gold medal – first place	2014 Leszno
Gold medal – first place	2016 Birštonas
Bronze medal – third place	2018 Nałęczów

Nicola Scaife (born 1984 or 1985) is an Australian hot air balloonist. She has won the FAI Women's World Hot Air Balloon Championship twice, in 2014 and 2016.

== Life ==
Scaife was born and raised in Albury, New South Wales, Australia. As a teenager, Scaife represented Australia in marathon kayaking, however she was forced to retire due to injury. She went on a hot air balloon flight with her mother and became interested in the industry - she started working for a hot air balloon company, initially in administration and support roles, and then began flying in 2006. In 2007, she earned her private Pilot’s Certificate and later moved on to become a Commercial Pilot.

Her first competition ballooning event was in 2013 in Canowindra, New South Wales. In 2014, Scaife won the first women's world championship event in Leszno, Poland, in what was only her fourth competitive event. In July 2016, she successfully defended her title at the 2nd FAI Women’s World Hot Air Balloon Championship in Birstonas, Lithuania. In 2018, Scaife won bronze at 3rd FAI Women's World Hot Air Balloon Championship in Nałęczów, Poland.

Scaife and her husband run a hot air ballooning company in the Hunter Valley, New South Wales, Australia.
