= Gintaras =

- Gender: m

Origin
- Origin: Lithuanian
- Meaning: gintaras = amber
- Region of origin: Lithuania

Other names
- Related names: Gintarė

Gintaras is a Lithuanian masculine given name. The feminine form is Gintarė. and may refer to:

- Gintaras Ambraska (born 1975), Lithuanian judoka
- Gintaras Andriuškevičius (born 1975), Lithuanian race walker
- Gintaras Balčiūnas (born 1964), Lithuanian lawyer and former Minister of Justice
- Gintaras Beresnevičius (1961–2006), Lithuanian historian of religions specializing in Baltic mythology
- Gintaras Didžiokas (born 1966), Lithuanian politician and Member of the European Parliament
- Gintaras Einikis (born 1969), Lithuanian basketball player
- Gintaras Grušas (born 1961), Lithuanian–American prelate of the Catholic Church
- Gintaras Jasinskas (born 1968), Lithuanian biathlete
- Gintaras Janusevicius (born 1985), Lithuanian pianist
- Gintaras Kadžiulis (born 1980), Lithuania basketball player and coach
- Gintaras Kantvilas (born 1956), Australian lichenologist
- Gintaras Karosas (born 1968), Lithuanian artist, founder and President of the non-profit organisation Europos parkas
- Gintaras Krapikas (born 1961), Lithuanian basketball player
- Gintaras Kvitkauskas (born 1967), Lithuanian footballer
- Gintaras Leonavičius (born 1983), Lithuanian basketball player
- Gintaras Ramonas (1962–1997), Lithuanian politician
- Gintaras Rinkevicius (born 1960), Lithuanian conductor, awarded the Lithuanian National Prize for Culture and Arts in 1994
- Gintaras Savukynas (born 1971), Lithuanian handball player
- Gintaras Sodeika (born 1961), Lithuanian painter
- Gintaras Staškevičius (born 1964), Lithuanian modern pentathlete
- Gintaras Staučė (born 1969), Lithuanian footballer and goalkeeping coach
- Gintaras Steponavičius (born 1967), Lithuanian politician
- Gintaras Šurkus (born 1953), Lithuanian balloonist and politician
