= Aleksandr Morozov (composer) =

Russian singer and composer (born 1948)

Alexander Morozov
- Алекса́ндр Серге́евич Моро́зов
- Born: Alexander Sergeyevich Morozov; 20 March 1948 (age 78); Ocnița, Moldavian Soviet Socialist Republic Soviet Union
- Occupations: Composer, singer
- Years active: 1968–present
- Website: aleksandr-morozov.ru

Alexander Sergeyevich Morozov (Russian: Алекса́ндр Серге́евич Моро́зов, Ocniţa, 20 March 1948) is a Russian singer and composer.

== Biography ==
Alexander Morozov was born in 1948 in Ocniţa. He completed his college studying piano. He began to write music at the age of 8. Among his first compositions were "Light of a far star", "Water stream", "Polka", and "The Clumsy Bear". He participated in two competitions of composers. In the first he received 3rd place, in the second he received a diploma. At the competition, the jury members were teachers at the Moscow conservatory. He presented the following compositions at the competitions: "Imagination", "In Anger", "The Etude Salt in A Minor", "The Etude B A Flat A Minor" and others. The composition "In Anger" was especially mentioned.

In early works of the author influence of music of composers – romanticists is felt: List, Chopin, Rachmaninov, and also late classicism. In 1994 for the first time has addressed to СЅ«сї¬«-harmonious language of the 20th century in product "In Anger," that has marked themselves the new period of creativity in which traditions of romantic music and music of 20th and 21st centuries closely were bound, collided and developed. Among compositions of the second period: "Emotions of left day", "Elements of fire" and "Marche – grotesque" which are interesting, first of all, for representing the symbiosis of romanticism and modern music. Language of Morozov does not gravitate to rigidity and dissonante soundings. Meeting accords are used, mainly, for display of conflicts and Rigidity conditions which can not be expressed by means of romantic music. The author – not the supporter of conceptual and abstract music. His compositions are inverted, first of all to soul of the student and only then – to reason. This author considers music as art of the aesthetic fine beginning, capable to ennoble the listener above the ordinary and means of a musical palette to inform the listener of the images, experiences, not imposing thus them. In compositions of 2010 the author intentionally refuses to name them to give absolute freedom to the listener in perception of the music.

Morozov has discovered and promoted many young artists, among them the operatic tenor Nikolai Baskov.

== Popular songs ==
- Malinovy Zvon by Nikolai Gnatyuk
- Dusha bolit by Mikhail Shufutinsky
- Mosti by Mikhail Shufutinsky
- Marina by Mikhail Shufutinsky
- V krayu magnoliy by Ariel
- V gornitse moyey svetlo by Gintarė Jautakaitė
- Belaya noch by Forum
- Uleteli listja by Forum
- Za Dunayem by Yaroslav Evdokimov
- Fantazyor by Yaroslav Evdokimov
- Platie by Iosif Kobzon
- Moi Golub Sizokryli by Alla Pugacheva
- v kletke by Valery Leontiev
- Ptashechka Moya by Philipp Kirkorov
- Ot Peterburga Do Moskvy by Lev Leshchenko
- Chari coldovskie by Lev Leshchenko
- Lubite poka lubitsa by VIA Zdravstvuy, pesnya
- Papa, podari mne kuklu by Lyudmila Barykina
