= Rokas Kostiuškevičius =

Lithuanian balloonist

Medal record

Hot air ballooning

Representing Lithuania

European Championship
Gold medal – first place	2013 Włocławek	Overall

World Junior Championships
Gold medal – first place	2012 Marijampolė	Overall
Silver medal – second place	2014 Vichy	Overall

Rokas Kostiuškevičius (born 1990) is a Lithuanian balloonist.

In 2012 Marijampolė hosted first World Junior Championships, where Kostiuškevičius won. In 2012 World Championships for seniors he finished in 27th place.

In 2013 European Championships he won the overall competition, ahead of his father Rimas Kostiuškevičius, who won silver.
