= Gintarė Jautakaitė =

Lithuanian-born American female singer

Gintarė Jautakaitė is a Lithuanian-born American female singer.

== Biography ==
At the age of 6 she won a children's contest on a radio with a song she wrote herself. She graduated from the Stasys Šimkus Conservatory in Klaipėda (piano class and jazz improvisation), she studied at Vilnius University.

In 1981 she won the first prize at the contest of young pop artists in Dnepropetrovsk. At the final concert of the festival Pesnya goda in 1981, she sang the song by Alexander Morozov to the verses of Nikolay Rubtsov In the Upper Room.

She immigrated to the United States in 1982 and became a U.S. citizen in 1983.

In 1992 she performed in the presence of Pope John Paul II during his tour.

In 1997 she signed her first major record deal with EMI Records in England and a publishing contract with Sony. In March 2000 her album “Earthless” was published. Her songs reached as high as number 13 on the British pop charts, and her song “Guilty” reached number 10 on the British club charts. The song “Hysteria” was featured in Hollywood box office hit “xXx” starring Vin Diesel. In addition, the innovative "square" CD and singles packaging for the album was praised by critics and featured in the book “CD Art – Innovation in CD Packaging Design” by Charlotte Rivers.

In 2001, she returned to the US and released her second album “Feathermark” on her own record label SkySonic Records with producer Michael McInnis. It was well received by her fans as well as new listeners and was played and sold worldwide.

She has worked with Lincoln Clapp (Bee Gees, Whitney Houston and others) from 2009 to the present.

== Discography ==
- 2000: Earthless, EMI Records
- 2003: Feathermark, SkySonic Records
- 2009: Kol prašvis, (Official page )

== Filmography ==
- 1978: Paskutinis Barjeras as episode
- 1981: Thanks for the Sturdy Weather as cameo
- 1992: The Abduction of Europa as Keila, English pop star
