= Gintarė Adomaitytė =

Lithuanian journalist (born 1957)

Gintarė Adomaitytė (born 30 January 1957 in Kaunas) is a Lithuanian journalist.

She graduated from Vilnius University in 1980. From 1994 to 1998 she worked on the magazine DZIĘCIOŁ.
