= Beata Choma =

Polish ballooning athlete

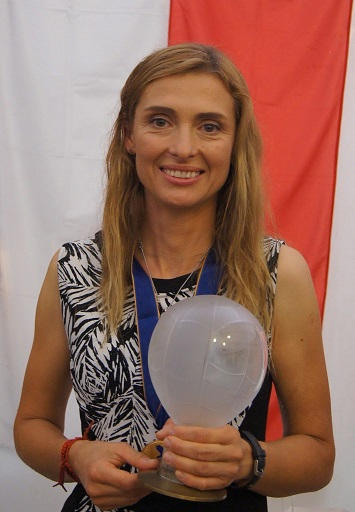
- Education: Maria Curie-Skłodowska University
- Occupation: Ballooning Athlete
- Children: Wiktor Choma (Son), Jagoda Choma (Daughter)
Medal record
Hot air ballooning
Representing Poland
Women's European Championship
Gold medal – first place	2017 Leszno	Women's Overall
- Website: www.beatachoma.pl

Beata Choma is a Polish ballooning athlete.

== Records and achievements ==
In 2014, Beata Choma represented Poland for the first FAI Women's World Hot Air Balloon Championship. She finished the competition in 13th place by acquiring a total of more than 9000 points.

She became the 4th European Women's Balloon Champion which was held in Leszno between 3 and 10 September 2017, overtaking Agne Simonaviciute. She secured 14127 points defeating Agne who secured 14026 points.

Choma took part in World Ballooning Championship held in Battle Creek, Michigan.
