= Gintaras Šurkus =

Lithuanian balloonist and politician

Medal record

Hot air ballooning

Representing Lithuania

World Championship
Bronze medal – third place	1999 Bad Waltersdorf	Overall

Gintaras Šurkus (born 13 August 1953) is a Lithuanian balloonist and politician.

In 1999, Šurkus won bronze in World Hot Air Ballooning Championships. In 2003 and 2011 was elected to Alytus council.
