= Rimas Kostiuškevičius =

Lithuanian balloonist

Medal record

Hot air ballooning

Representing Lithuania

World Championship
Silver medal – second place	2016 Saga	Overall

European Championship
Silver medal – second place	2013 Włocławek	Overall

Rimas Kostiuškevičius is a Lithuanian balloonist.

He competed in World Air Games in 2001 where he finished 76th. In 2005 World Championships he was 7th and in 2010 World Championships he finished 8th.

In 2013 European Championships Rimas finished 2nd, after his son Rokas Kostiuškevičius.
