= World Hot Air Ballooning Championships =

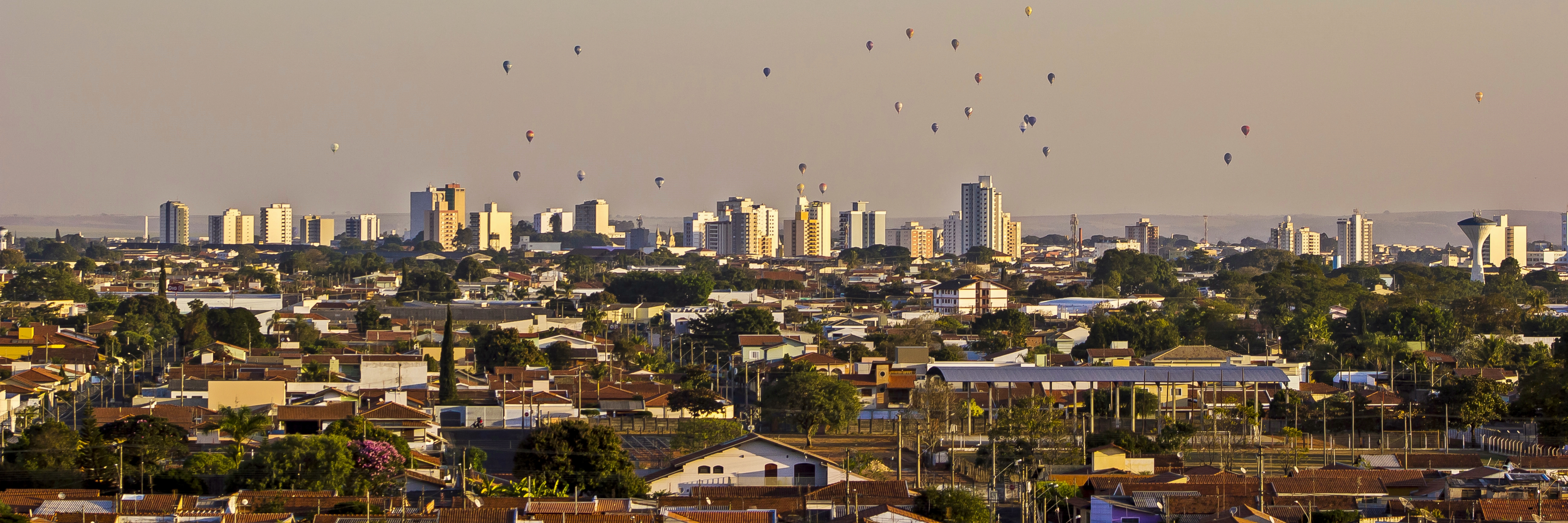
Skyline of Rio Claro, São Paulo, Brazil, during the 21st World Hot Air Balloon Championship.

The World Hot Air Ballooning Championships are the Fédération Aéronautique Internationale (FAI) World Hot Air Balloon Championship and the FAI Women's World Hot Air Balloon Championship. These biennial events for hot air ballooning are conducted under the direction of the FAI Ballooning Commission (CIA or Comité International d'Aérostation).

== Championships ==
=== FAI World Hot Air Balloon Championship ===
Year	City	Country	Date	Winners	No. of Athletes	No. of Nations
1973	Albuquerque	United States	February 10–17	(gold) Dennis Flodden (USA); (silver) Bill Cutter (USA); (bronze) Janne Balkedal (SWE)	32	14
1975	Albuquerque	United States	October 2–12	(gold) David Schaffer (USA); (silver) Janne Balkedal (SWE); (bronze) Peter Vizzard (AUS)	34	15
1977	Castle Howard	Great Britain	September 10–18	(gold) Paul Woessner (USA); (silver) Bruce Comstock (USA); (bronze) Michael Scudder (USA)	51	22
1979	Uppsala	Sweden	January 3–9	(gold) Paul Woessner (USA); (silver) Sid Cutter (USA); (bronze) Olivier Roux-Devillas (FRA)	33	16
1981	Battle Creek	United States	June 20–28	(gold) Bruce Comstock (USA); (silver) David Bareford (GBR); (bronze) Jan Balkedal (SWE)	82	21
1983	Nantes	France	August 28 – September 7	(gold) Peter Vizzard (AUS); (silver) Olivier Roux-Devillas (FRA); (bronze) David Bareford (GBR)	70	20
1985	Battle Creek	United States	July 12–20	(gold) David Levin (USA); (silver) Crispin Williams (GBR); (bronze) Bill Cunningham (USA)	98	23
1987	Schielleiten/Stubenberg	Austria	September 5–12	(gold) Al Nels (USA); (silver) Josef Starkbaum (AUT); (bronze) Leopold Hauer (AUT)	71	24
1989	Saga	Japan	November 18–27	(gold) Benedikt Haggeney (GER); (silver) Al Nels (USA); (bronze) Bruce Comstock (USA)	102	25
1991	Saint-Jean-sur-Richelieu	Canada	August 10–18	(gold) Al Nels (USA); (silver) Uwe Schneider (GER); (bronze) Uwe Claussen (GER)	101	26
1993	Larochette	Luxembourg	August 12–22	(gold) Alan Blount (USA); (silver) Owen Keown (USA); (bronze) Joe Heartsill (USA)	101	32
1995	Battle Creek	United States	June 30 – July 8	(gold) Joe Heartsill (USA); (silver) Phil Glebe (USA); (bronze) David Levin (USA)	86	32
1997	Saga	Japan	November 15–27	(gold) David Bareford (GBR); (silver) Janne Balkedal (SWE); (bronze) Joe Heartsill (USA)	112	38
1999	Bad Waltersdorf	Austria	August 28 – September 5	(gold) Bill Arras (USA); (silver) Uwe Schneider (GER); (bronze) Gintaras Šurkus (LTU)	90	35
2002	Châtellerault	France	August 23 – September 1	(gold) David Bareford (GBR); (silver) Steve Jones (USA); (bronze) Jan Balkedal (SWE)	99	36
2004	Mildura	Australia	June 26 - July 3	(gold) Markus Pieper (GER); (silver) Uwe Schneider (GER); (bronze) Paul Gibbs (AUS)	87	32
2006	Tochigi	Japan	November 18–25	(gold) John Petrehn (USA); (silver) Joe Heartsill (USA); (bronze) Uwe Schneider (GER)	62	31
2008	Hofkirchen	Austria	September 13–20	(gold) Francois Messines (FRA); (silver) Alexey Medvedsky (RUS); (bronze) Stephane Bolze (FRA)	102	33
2010	Debrecen	Hungary	October 2–10	(gold) Johnny Petrehn (USA); (silver) Nick Donner (USA); (bronze) Stefan Zeberli (SUI)	118	31
2012	Battle Creek	United States	August 17–25	(gold) Nick Donner (USA); (silver) Johnny Petrehn (USA); (bronze) Yudai Fujita (JPN)	99	30
2014	Rio Claro	Brazil	July 17–27	(gold) Yudai Fujita (JPN); (silver) Uwe Schneider (GER); (bronze) Lupercio Lima (BRA)	59	21
2016	Saga	Japan	October 30 – November 7	(gold) Rhett Heartsill (USA); (silver) Rimas Kostiuškevičius (LTU); (bronze) Stefan Zeberli (SUI)	105	31
2018	Groß-Siegharts	Austria	August 18–26	(gold) Dominic Bareford (GBR); (silver) Stefan Zeberli (SUI); (bronze) Sergey Latypov (RUS)	105	38
2022	Murska Sobota	Slovenia	September 18–22	(gold) Stefan Zeberli (SUI); (silver) Yudai Fujita (JPN); (bronze) Nicolas Schwartz (FRA)	103	31
2024	Szeged	Hungary	September 8–13	(gold) Clément Seigeot (FRA); (silver) Tomasz Filus (POL); (bronze) Joe Heartsill (USA)	118	28
2026	Krosno	Poland	September 20–24	(gold) Dominic Bareford (GBR); (silver) Paul Cuenot (FRA); (bronze) Stefan Zeberli (SUI)	101	31

==== Team competition (since 2018) ====
Event	Gold		Silver		Bronze	
2018 Austria Groß-Siegharts	Russia Sergey Latypov Ivan Menyaylo Evgeny Chubarov Andrey Kulkov	640,4	Belgium David Spildooren Steven Vlegels	640,3	Australia Nicola Scaife Matthew Scaife Sean Kavanagh Andrew Robertson	638,2
2022 Slovenia Murska Sobota	France Nicolas Schwartz Jean-Philippe Odouard Clément Seigeot Laure De Coligny	642,2	Japan Yudai Fujita Shiro Katahira Sansei Tomizawa Satoshi Ueda	614	Switzerland Stefan Zeberli Marc Blaser René Erni Cedric Gauch Roman Hugi Nicole Vogel	598
2024 Hungary Szeged	United States Bruce Wood Cameron Wall Chase Donner Jeremy Rubin Joe Heartsill Joe Zvada Johnny R. Petrehn Lucas Heartsill Nick Donner Rhett Heartsill	644,1	France Clément Seigeot Paul Cuenot Etienne Mercier Jean-Philippe Odouard Nicolas Philippe Michel Bourbier Nicolas Schwartz	619,8	Belgium Arthur Alleman David Spildooren Kenian Dekein Maarten Deleersnyder Steven Vlegels Thomas Spildooren	595,4

=== FAI Women's World Hot Air Balloon Championship ===
Year	City	Country	Date	Winners	No. of Athletes	No. of Nations
2014	Leszno	Poland	September 8–13	(gold) Nicola Scaife (AUS); (silver) Elisabeth Kindermann (AUT); (bronze) Agnė Simonavičiūtė (LTU)	38	16
2016	Birštonas	Lithuania	July 5–10	(gold) Nicola Scaife (AUS); (silver) Ann Herdewyn (BEL); (bronze) Cheri White (USA)	42	20
2018	Nałęczów	Poland	August 7–11	(gold) Daria Dudkiewicz (POL); (silver) Agnė Simonavičiūtė (LTU); (bronze) Nicola Scaife (AUS)	33	10
2023	Northam	Australia	September 4–9	(gold) Nicola Scaife (AUS); (silver) Stephanie Hemmings (GBR); (bronze) Sanne Haarhuis (NED)	30	13

== All-time medal table ==
Updated after the 2026 World Championships (excluding team competitions).

Rank	Nation	Gold	Silver	Bronze	Total
1	United States	15	10	8	33
2	Great Britain	4	3	1	8
3	Australia	4	0	3	7
4	Germany	2	4	2	8
5	France	2	2	3	7
6	Switzerland	1	1	3	5
7	Japan	1	1	1	3
8	Poland	1	1	0	2
9	Sweden	0	2	3	5
10	Lithuania	0	2	2	4
11	Austria	0	2	1	3
12	Russia	0	1	1	2
13	Belgium	0	1	0	1
14	Brazil	0	0	1	1
14	Netherlands	0	0	1	1
Totals (15 entries)		30	30	30	90

== See also ==
- World Junior Hot Air Ballooning Championships
- European Hot Air Balloon Championships
