= World Junior Hot Air Ballooning Championships =

World Junior Hot Air Ballooning Championships is main ballooning championships in the World for juniors. Organized by Fédération Aéronautique Internationale.

== Championships ==
Year	City	Country	Date	Winners	No. of Athletes	No. of Nations
2012	Marijampolė	Lithuania	May 22–27	(gold) Rokas Kostiuškevičius (Lithuania); (silver) Thomas Merceron (France); (bronze) Pascal Kreins (Germany)	26	13
2014	Vichy	France	August 28 - September 6	(gold) Dominic Bareford (United Kingdom of Great Britain and Northern Ireland); (silver) Rokas Kostiuškevičius (Lithuania); (bronze) Clement Seigeot (France)	31	15
2016	Marijampolė	Lithuania	June 29 - July 3	(gold) Rokas Kostiuškevičius (Lithuania); (silver) Tomasz Filus (Poland); (bronze) Dominic Bareford (United Kingdom of Great Britain and Northern Ireland)	36	17
2018	Włocławek	Poland	September 11 - September 16	(gold) Jan Suchy (Czech Republic); (silver) Roy Gommer (The Netherlands); (bronze) Dominic Bareford (United Kingdom of Great Britain and Northern Ireland)	49	17
2021	Leszno	Poland	August 10–14	(gold) Roy Gommer (The Netherlands); (silver) Denis Dawidziuk (Poland); (bronze) Dmitriy Zhokhov (Russia)	43	14
2023	Grudziądz	Poland	August 21–26	(gold) Daniel Gregory (United Kingdom of Great Britain and Northern Ireland); (silver) Jakub Dziedziak (Poland); (bronze) Maarten Deleersnyder (Belgium)	45	17

== All-time medal table ==
Updated after 2023 Championships.

Rank	Nation	Gold	Silver	Bronze	Total
1	Lithuania	2	1	0	3
2	Great Britain	2	0	2	4
3	Netherlands	1	1	0	2
4	Czech Republic	1	0	0	1
5	Poland	0	3	0	3
6	France	0	1	1	2
7	Belgium	0	0	1	1
7	Germany	0	0	1	1
7	Russia	0	0	1	1
Totals (9 entries)		6	6	6	18
