= Nałęczów =

- Spa town
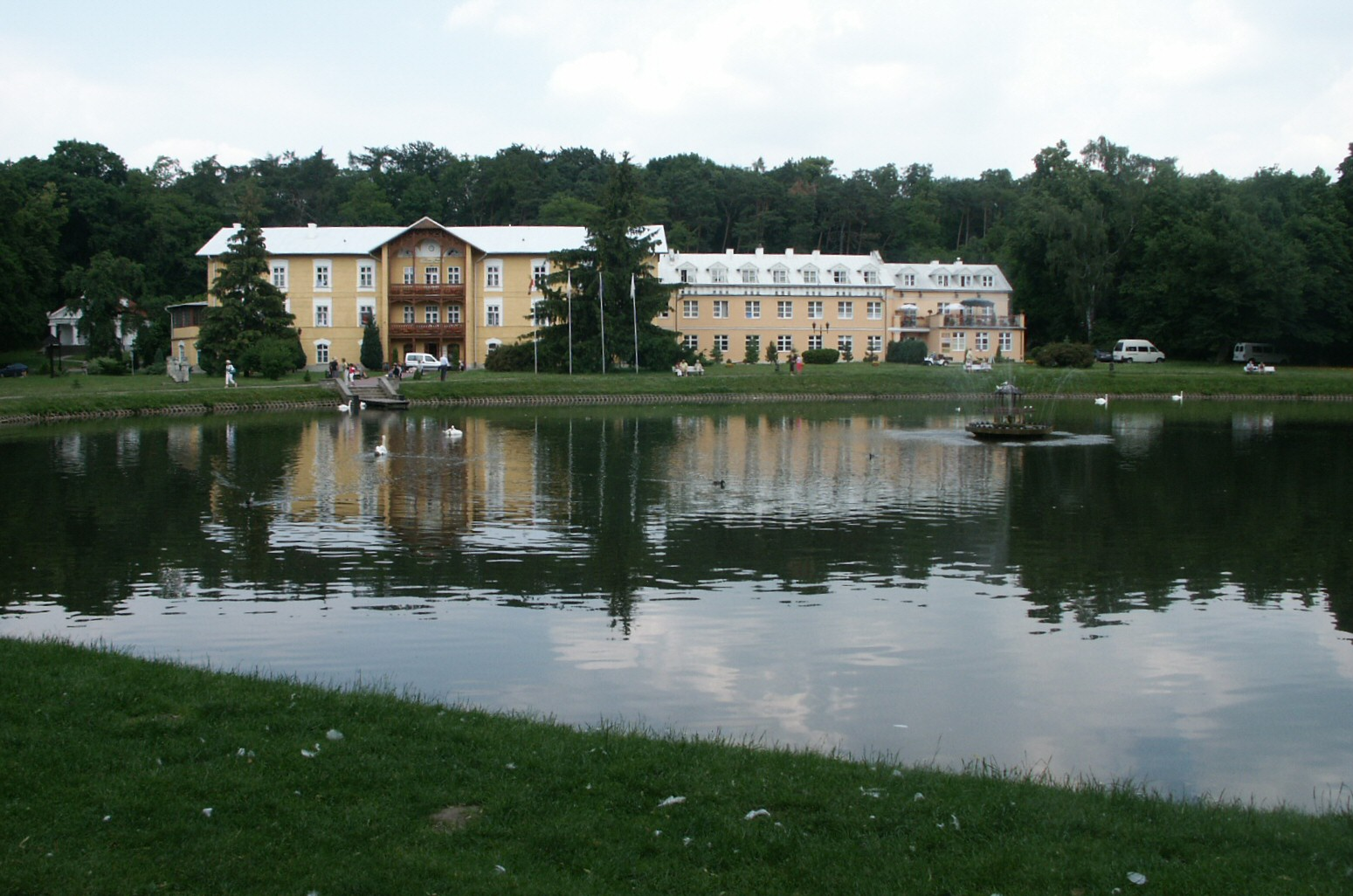
- The Prince Józef sanatorium in Nałęczów.

- Coat of arms
- Interactive map of Nałęczów
- Location within Poland
- Coordinates: 51°17′N 22°13′E
- Country: Poland
- Voivodeship: Lublin
- County: Puławy
- Gmina: Nałęczów
- Founded: 8th or 9th century
- Incorporated: 1963

Government
  - Mayor: Wiesław Pardyka (Ind.)

Area
  - Total: 13.82 km^{2} (5.34 sq mi)
- Elevation: 212 m (696 ft)

Population (2012)
  - Total: 3,958
  - Density: 286.4/km^{2} (741.8/sq mi)
- Time zone: UTC+1 (CET)
  - Summer (DST): UTC+2 (CEST)
- Postal code: 24-140, 24-150
- Car plates: LPU
- Website: http://www.naleczow.pl

Nałęczów [naˈwɛnt͡ʂuf] is a spa town (population 4,800) situated on the Nałęczów Plateau in Puławy County, Lublin Voivodeship, eastern Poland. Nałęczów belongs to Lesser Poland.

== History ==
In the 18th century, the discovery of healing waters initiated the development of a health resort. The main treatments are for circulatory disorders. The water is now bottled and sold around the world under the Nałęczowianka brand.

Notable landmarks include the 18th-century baroque-classicist Małachowski Palace (1771–73, since remodeled) and a park and resort complex dating from the 18th-19th centuries.

Nałęczów was the favorite vacationing place of the novelist Bolesław Prus for three decades from 1882 till his death in 1912. It features museums devoted to Prus and to novelist Stefan Żeromski, a fellow frequent visitor whose literary career Prus generously furthered.

The local Jewish population was 250-400 Jews in 1939. In the spring of 1942, Nałęczów was used as a transfer point by the occupying Germans, who herded area Jews onto cattle rail cars, to be transported to both Bełżec and Sobibor death camps. The Jewish community ceased to exist.

== Twin towns ==
Nałęczów is twinned with:

- Steglitz-Zehlendorf (Germany)
- Nyíracsád (Hungary)
- Trenčianske Teplice (Slovakia)
- Longueau (France)
- Serhiyivka (Ukraine)

== Gallery ==
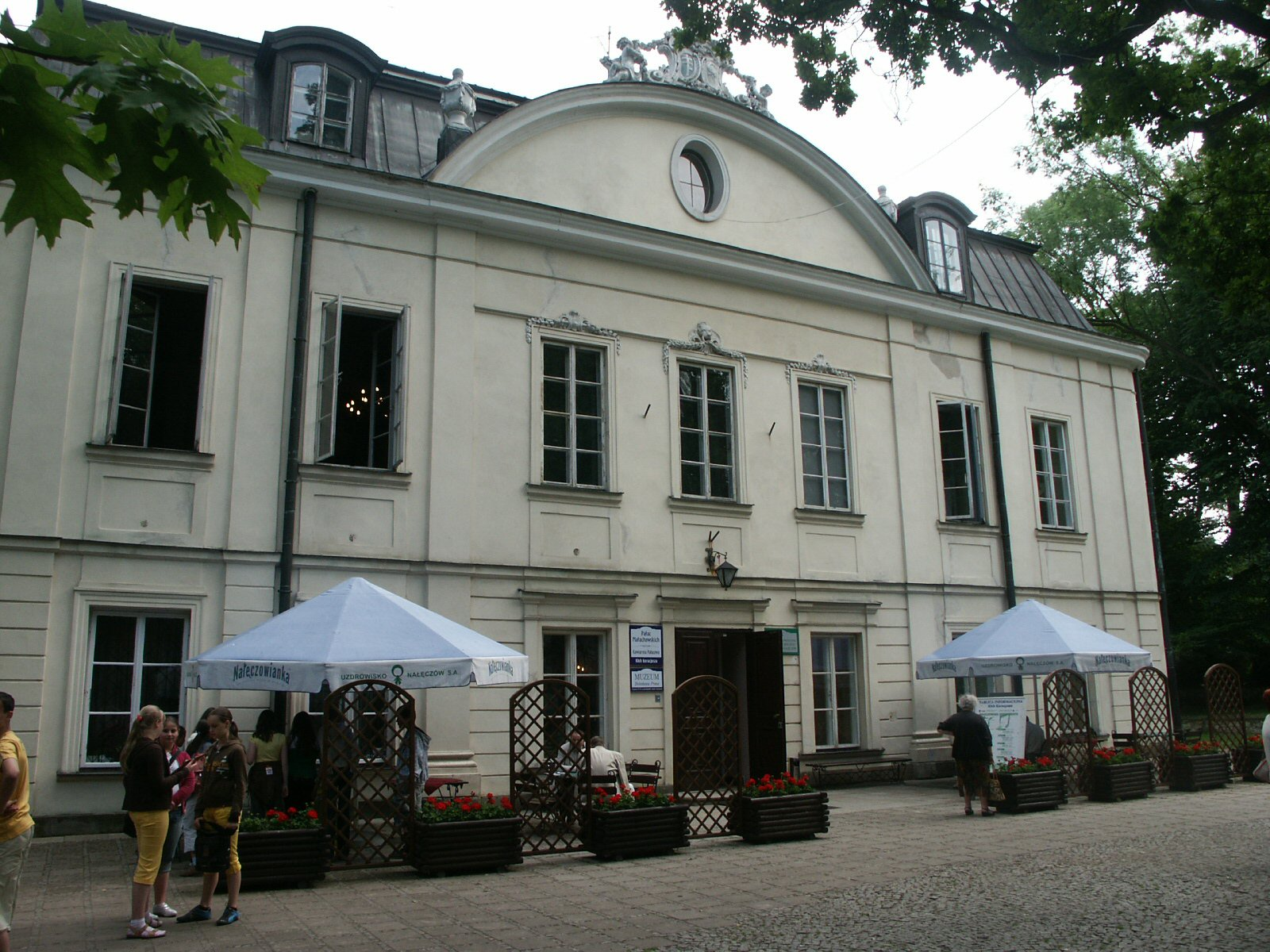
Małachowski Palace

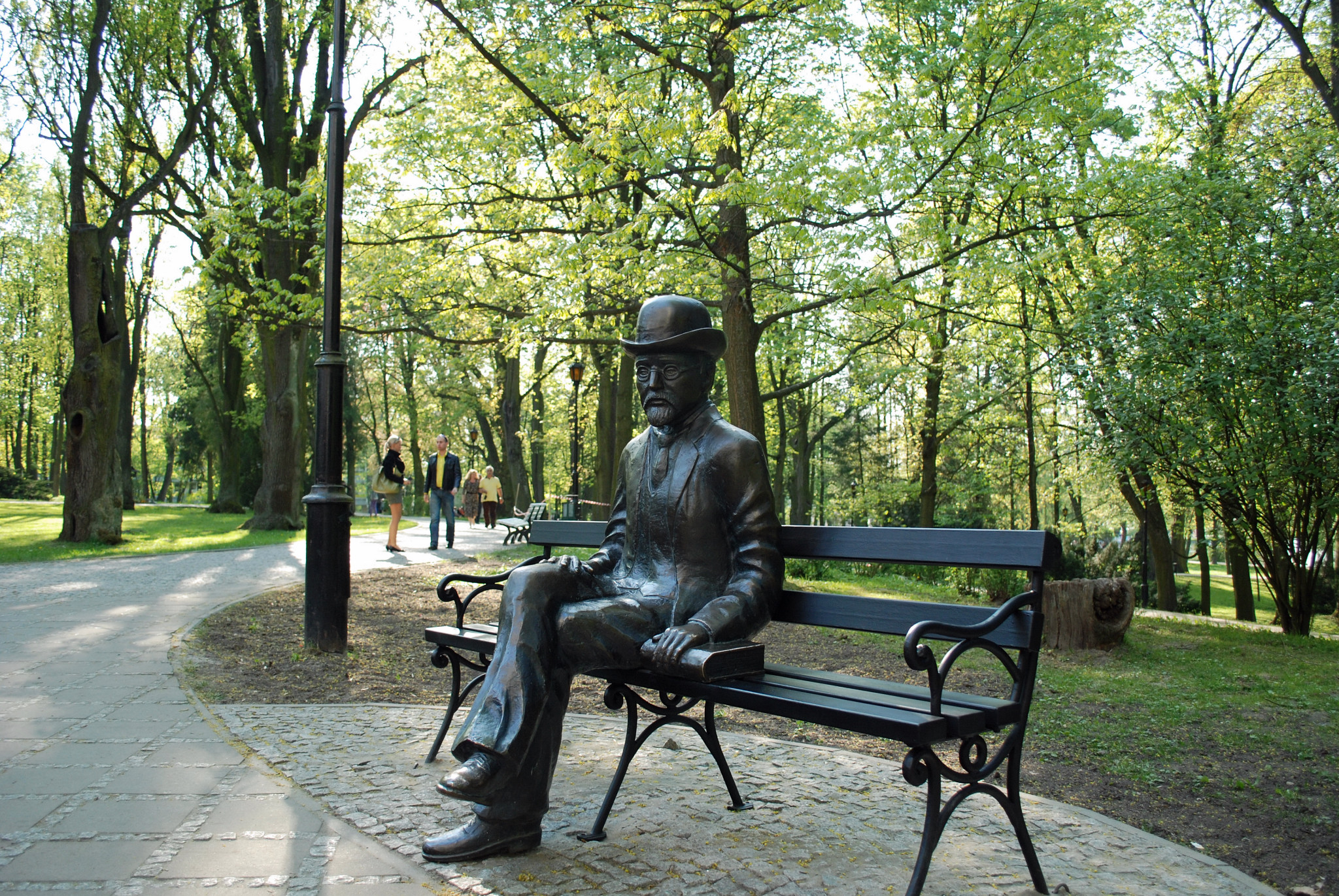
Bolesław Prus sculpture, outside the Museum dedicated to the author in the Małachowski Palace

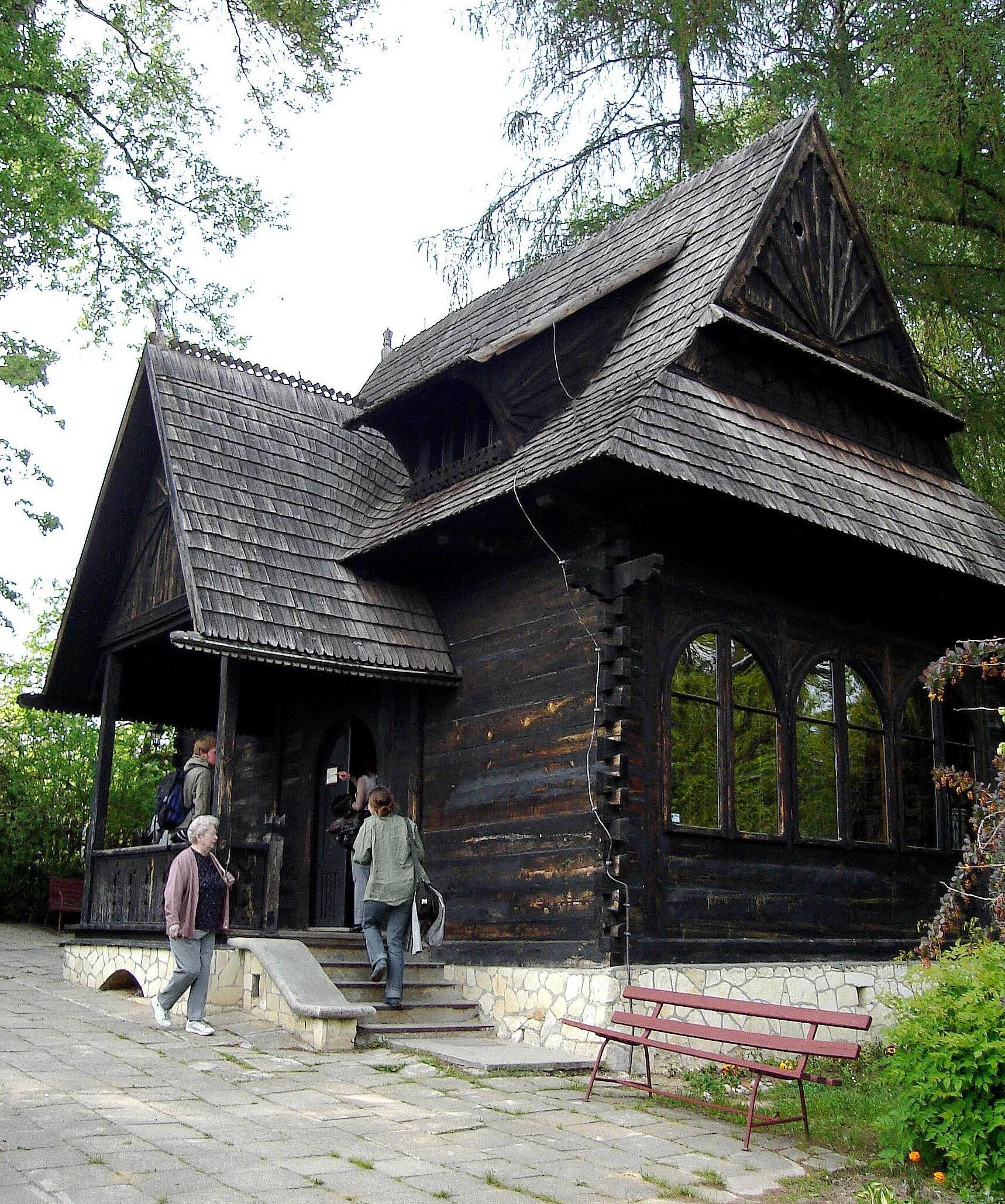
Stefan Żeromski's Chata, designed in the Zakopane Style of Architecture

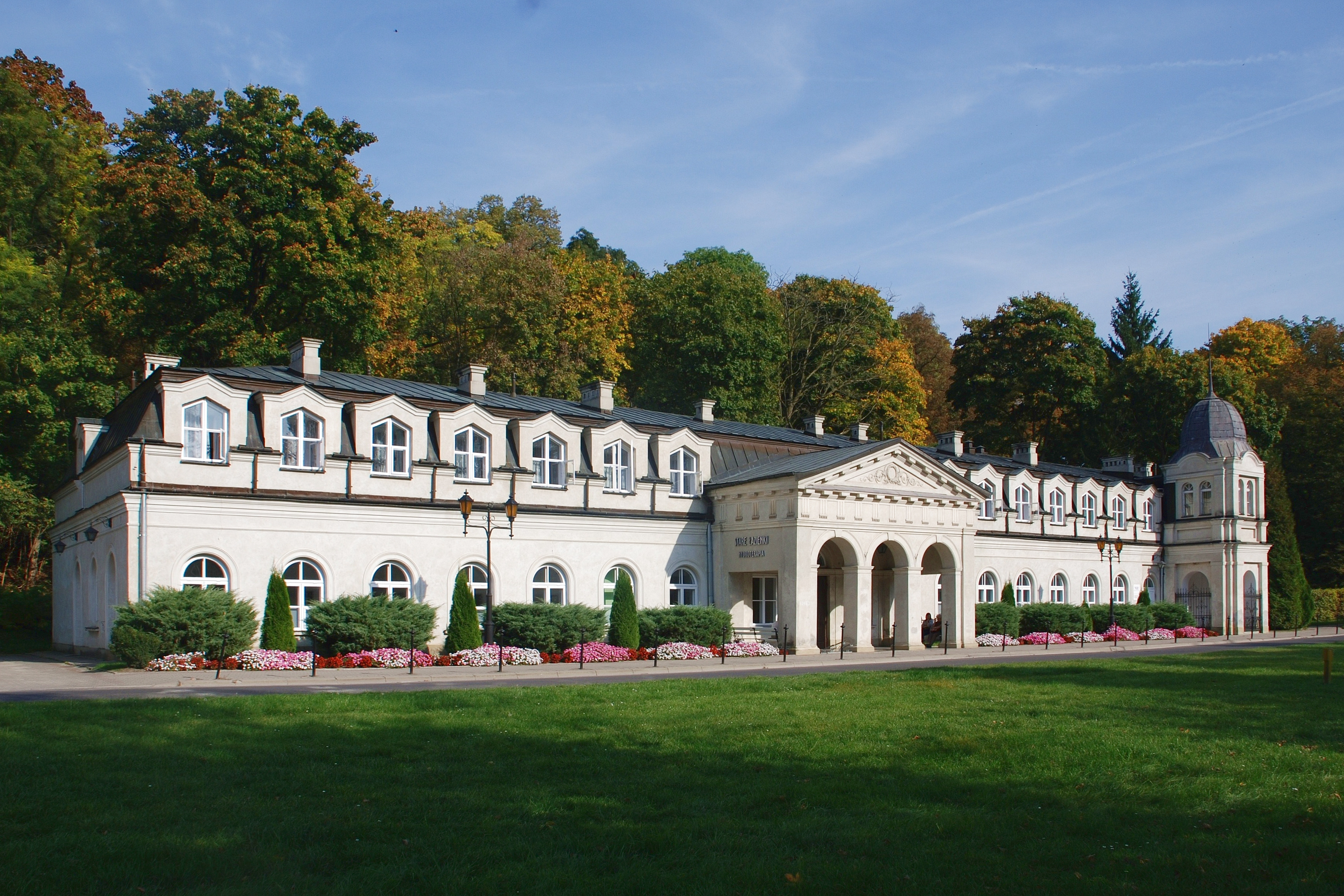
Stare Łazienki Sanatorium

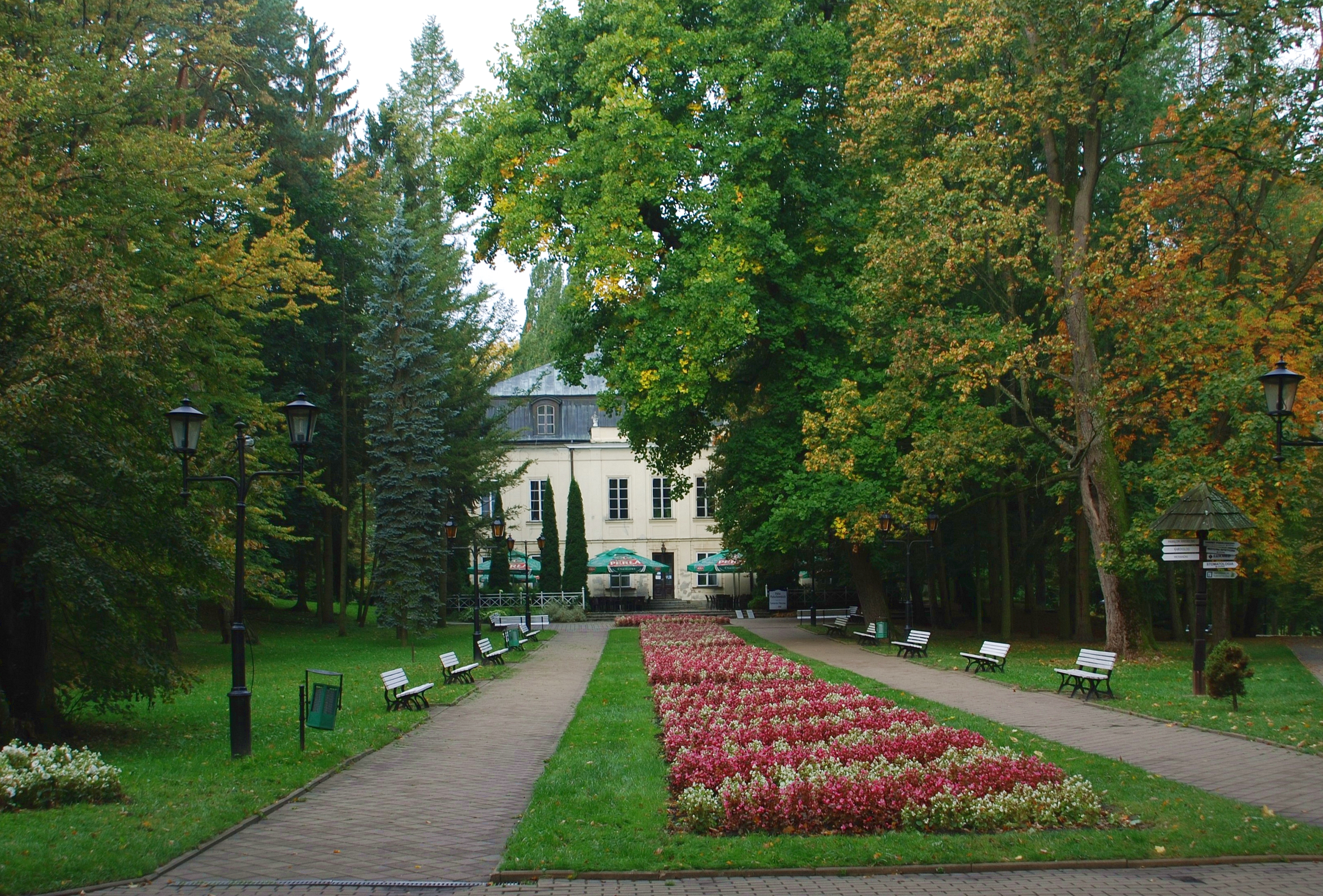
Małachowski Alley

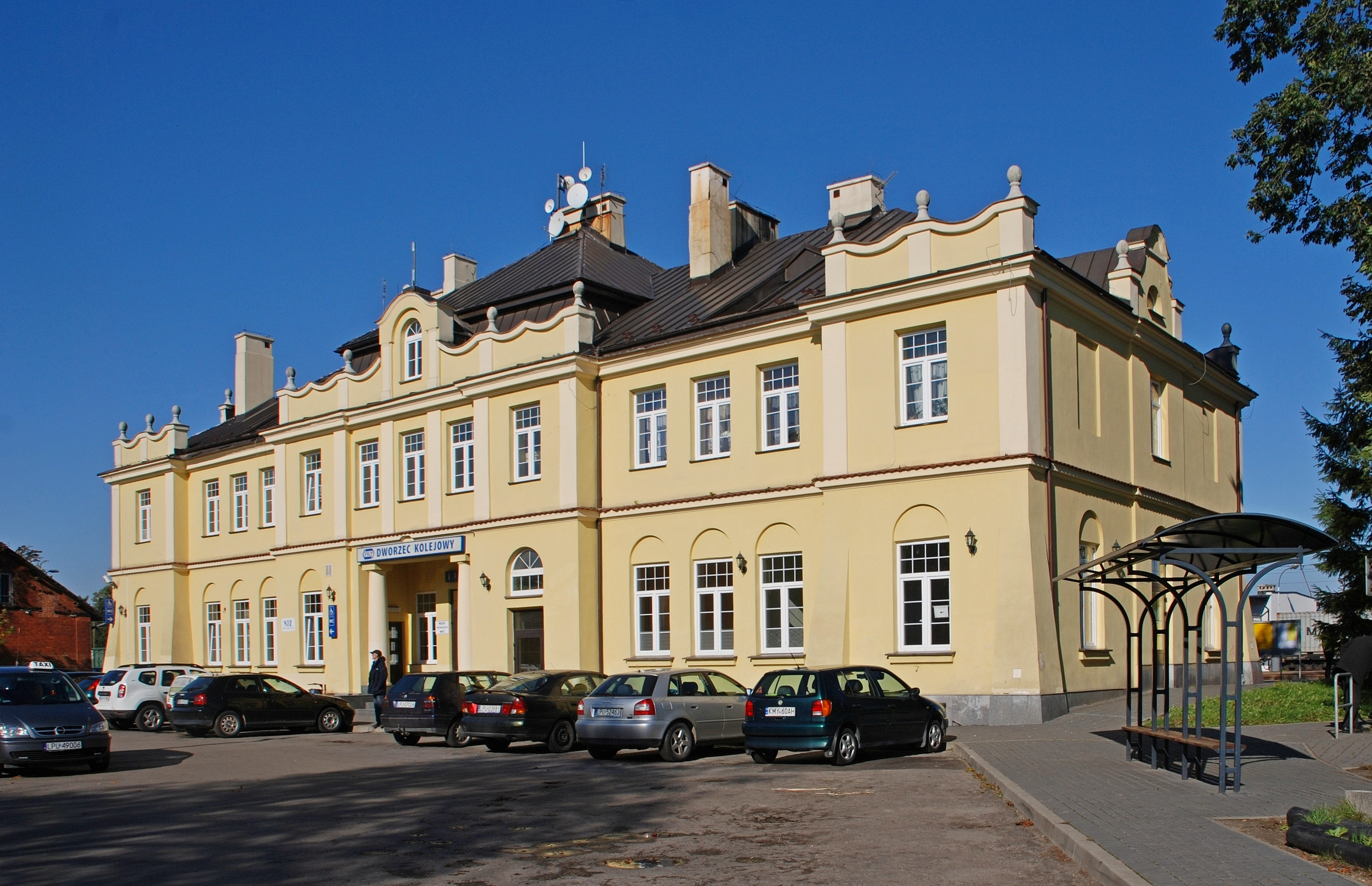
Railway station

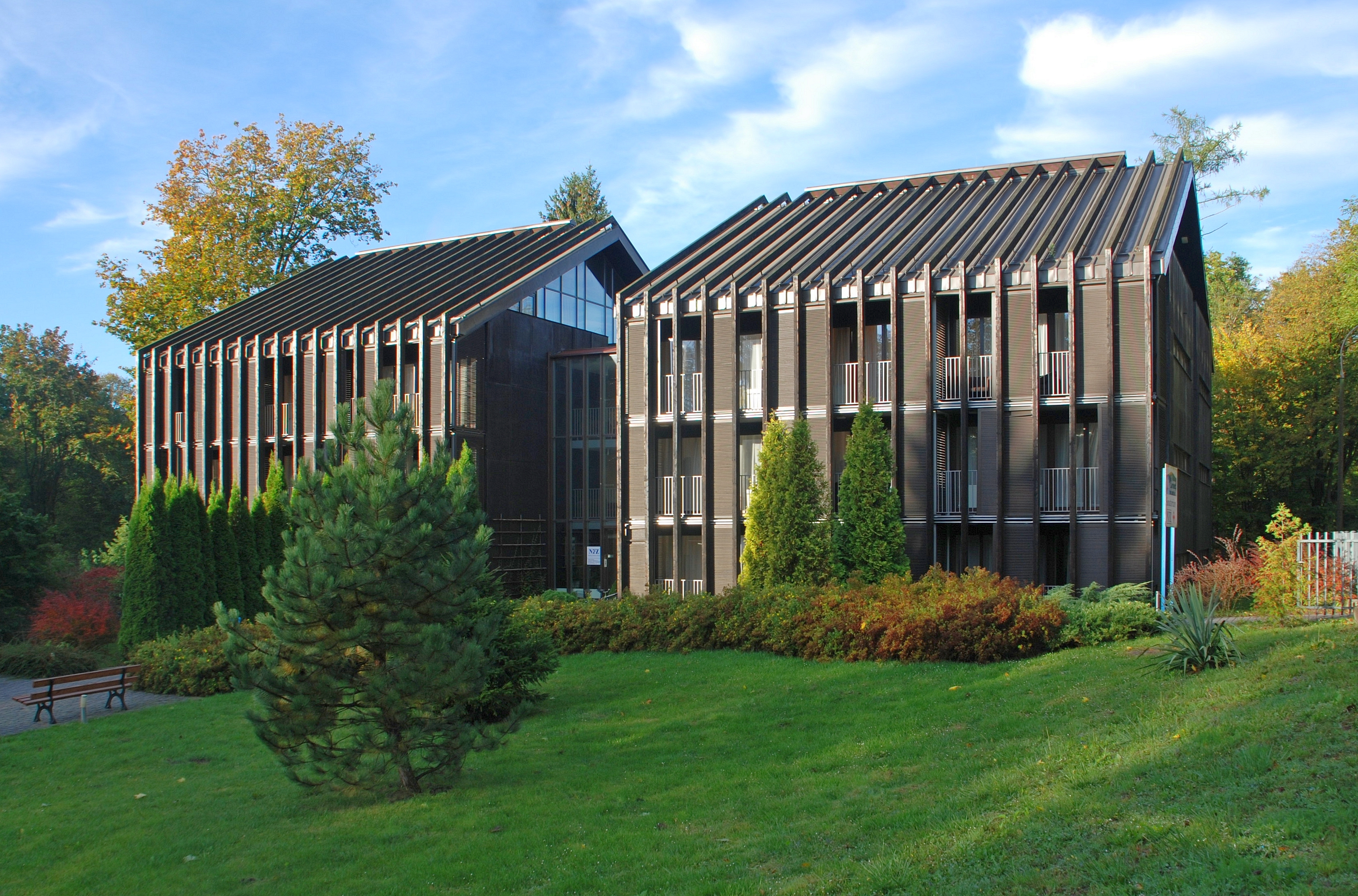
Fortunat Sanatorium

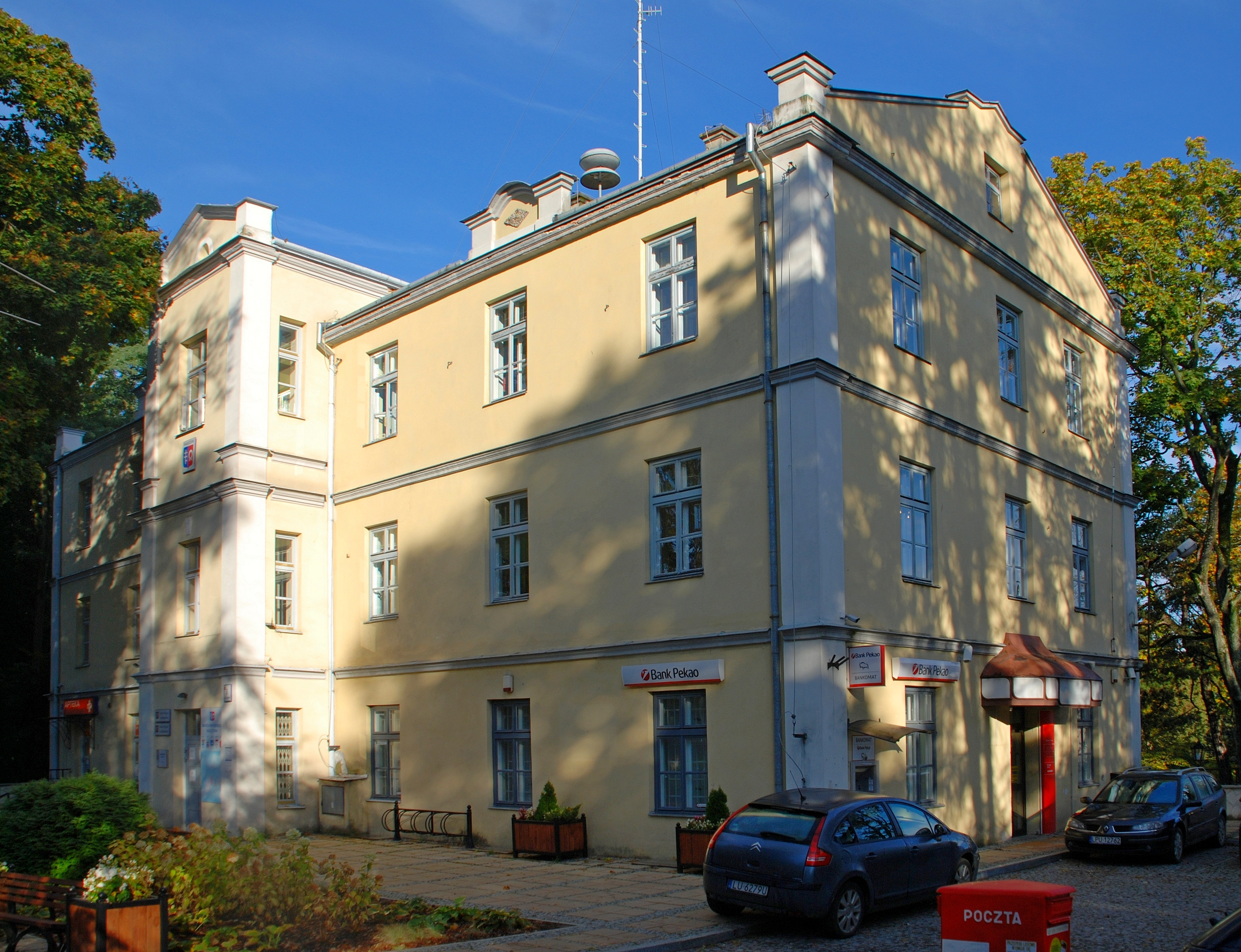
Town hall

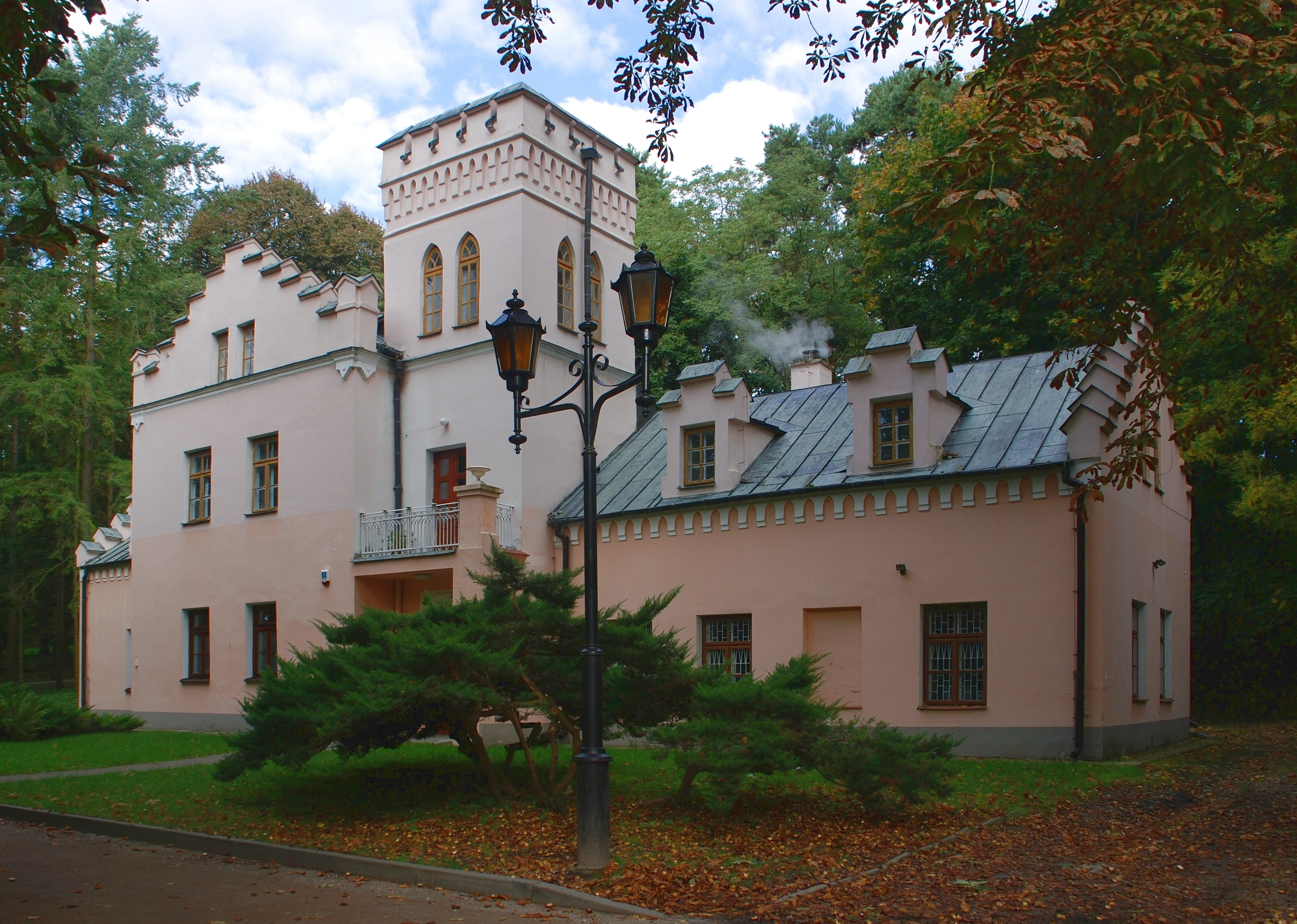
Domek gotycki (transl. Gothic House)
