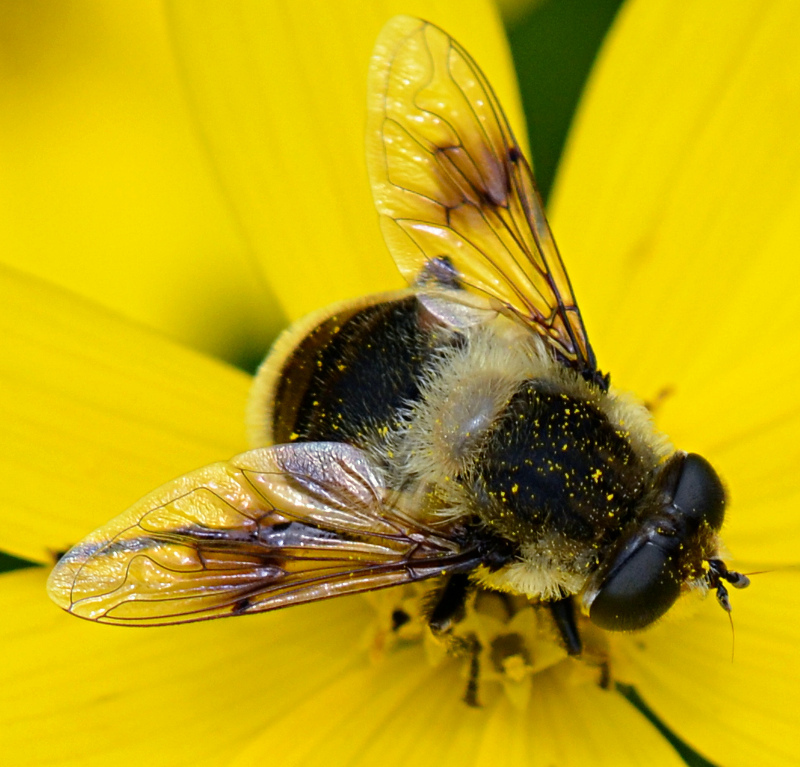

Scientific classification
- Kingdom: Animalia
- Phylum: Arthropoda
- Clade: Pancrustacea
- Class: Insecta
- Order: Diptera
- Family: Syrphidae
- Genus: Eristalis
- Species: E. anthophorina

Binomial name
- Eristalis anthophorina (Fallén, 1817)

Synonyms
- List: Eristalis bastardii Macquart, 1842; Eristalis everes Walker, 1852; Eristalis mellisoids Hull, 1925; Eristalis mellissoides Hull, 1925; Eristalis montanus Williston, 1882; Eristalis nebulosus Walker, 1849; Eristalis occidentalis Osburn, 1907; Eristalis perplexus Hull, 1925; Eristalis pterelas Say, 1835; Eristalis semimetallicus Macquart, 1850; Syrphus anthophorinus Fallén, 1817

= Eristalis anthophorina =

Species of fly

Eristalis anthophorina, the orange-spotted drone fly, is a species of syrphid fly with a Holarctic distribution. It is a common fly in wetlands, including bogs, fens, and woodland pools. In North America, it occurs throughout much of Canada and primarily in the northern parts of the United States. It may be introduced in North America.

== Distribution ==
This species is Holarctic in distribution. It is widely distributed worldwide in northern North American and Europe. It is a common in wetlands, including bogs, fens, and woodland pools. In North America, it occurs throughout much of Canada and primarily in the northern parts of the United States. It may be introduced in North America. external map

== Description ==
This fly can easily be confused with bumblebees. It reaches around 15 mm (0.6 in) in length.

Head

The face is reddish-yellow pollinose, with white pilose sides and a shining black median stripe and with black broadly on the cheeks (gena). The antennae are black with the arista reddish and pubescent near the base. The eyes are completely pilose, holoptic in the male.

Thorax

The thorax is black with long yellow hairs. The scutellum is wholly yellow, densely covered with yellow pile.

Abdomen

The first abdominal segment is black. The second segment is broadly shining with orange spots laterally. The remaining abdomen is black with long yellow-orange pile.

Wings

The wings are nearly hyaline. The stigmatic spot is dark brown with a broad, distinct, brownish spot in the middle of the wing. Wing veination: sinuous r_{4+5}, closed cell r1 anterior cross-vein (r-m) near the middle of discal cell (dm), oblique.

Legs

The legs are black, with black pile. The tibia is yellowish at the base.

Eristalis wing

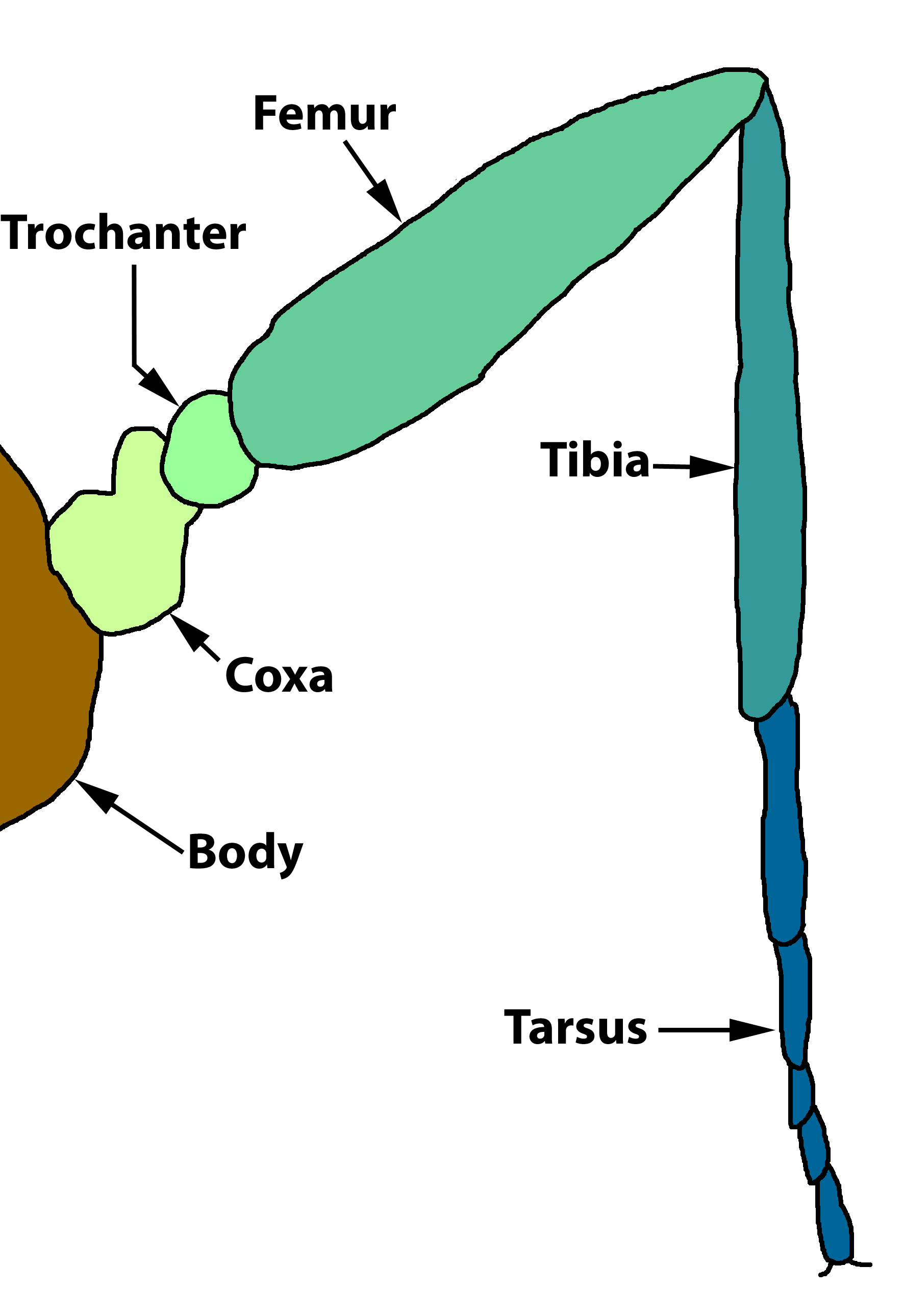
Insect leg

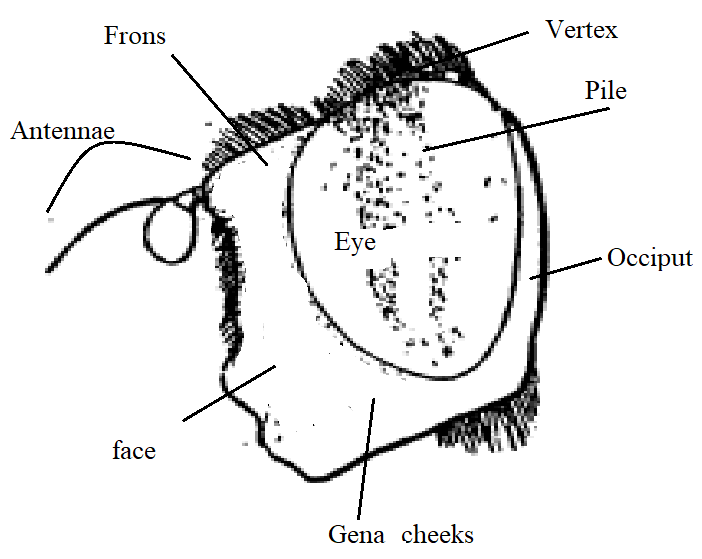
Eristalis head

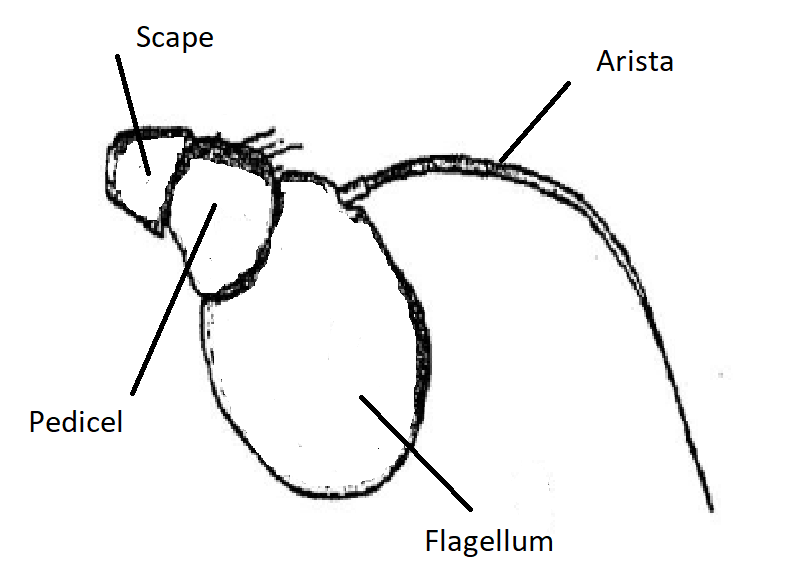
Syrphid antenna

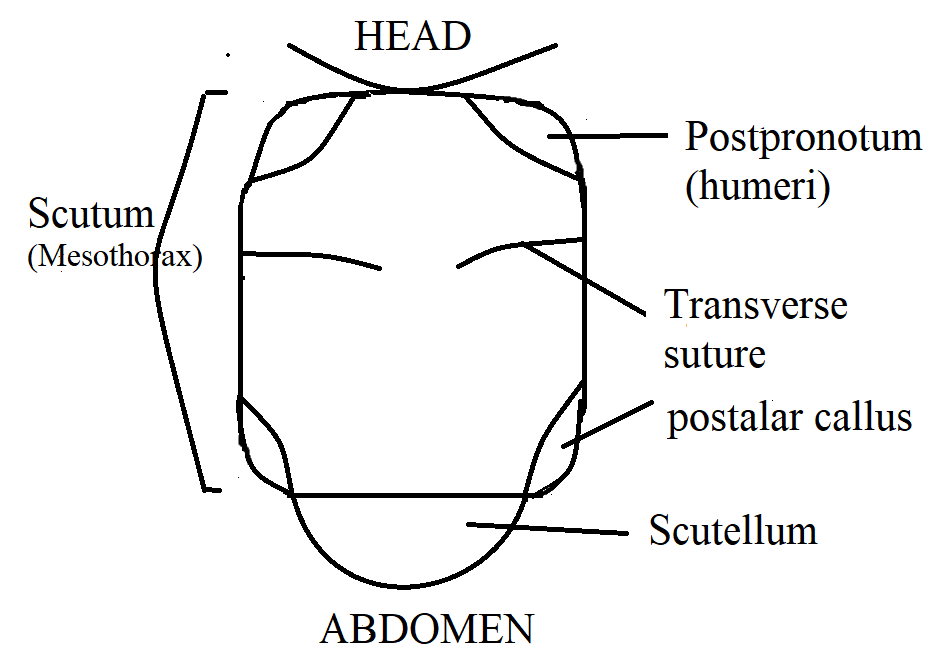
Dorsal view of syrphid thorax

== Ecology ==
It has been observed visiting the flowers of Verbena hastata (blue vervain), Salix myricoides (blue-leaved willow), and Hesperis matronalis (dame's rocket).
