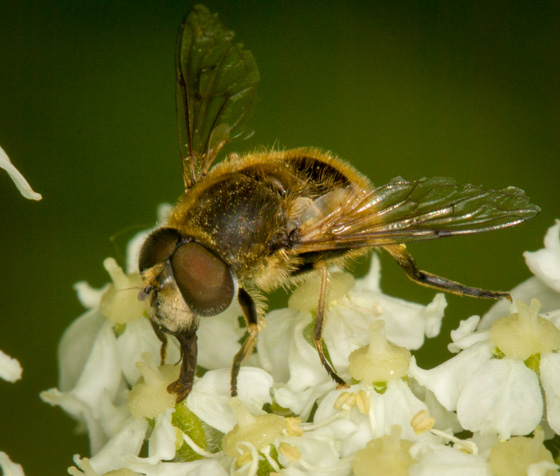
- Male Eristalis brousii

Scientific classification
- Kingdom: Animalia
- Phylum: Arthropoda
- Class: Insecta
- Order: Diptera
- Family: Syrphidae
- Genus: Eristalis
- Species: E. brousii

Binomial name
- Eristalis brousii Williston, 1882

= Eristalis brousii =

Species of fly

Eristalis brousii, also known as the hourglass drone fly, is a fly species in the Syrphidae family first described by Samuel Wendell Williston in 1882. The species has become largely extinct outside of Northern Canada. Eristalis brousii are part of the hoverfly family, known for hovering above flowers to collect nectar and pollen.

The larvae are rat-tailed aquatic filter-feeders.

== Description ==
Eristalis brousii is similar to Eristalis arbustorum, but with differing coloration of the mesotibia (middle section of the tibia). E. brousii has yellow coloring on the basal half of the mesotibia and reddish-brown to black coloring on the basal tarsomere of the mesoleg. E. arbustorum has yellow coloring on the basal third of the mesotibia, and brown and black coloring on the basal tarsomere of the mesoleg. E. brousii measures 9–12 mm (0.35–0.47 in) in length.

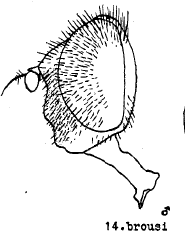
Eristalis brousii head

=== Head ===
The frontal triangle is slightly shiny along the middle. In females, the front is reddish pollinose and shinier above the antennae compared to males. The head is black, covered with yellow pollen and pile while the tubercle, the oral margin, and the cheeks are black. The antennae are black with the third joint (flagellum) being red. The eyes are pilose and, in males, contiguous for only a short distance. The arista is red and briefly pilose near the base. The posterior lateral orbits are white pollinose.

=== Thorax ===
The scutum is black and with a copper luster. Two opaque, lightly colored stripes reach from the front to the scutellum. They are limited by three narrow, opaque, black stripes. The pile of the scutum is light red. The scutellum is subtranslucent yellow or red on the outer part. The pile of the pleura is white.

=== Wings ===
The wings are hyaline with a brown stigma. In females, the wings have a large brown spot. Venation includes the Spurious vein (sv), looping of R_{4+5} into r_{4+5}, closed cell r_{2+3}, and the Anterior cross-vein (r-m) near or beyond the middle of the discal cell (dm).

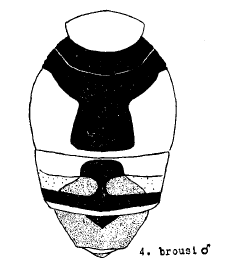
Eristalis brousii abdomen

=== Abdomen ===
On the abdomen of a male, the first segment is black, the second orange or yellow, broad on the sides and narrow across the hind border, elsewhere black; on the posterior, nearly a third of the width of the segment is black; the sides approach each other towards the front and then at right angles extend outward along the anterior margin of the segment; the lateral prolongations are convex on their hind borders and reach to the lateral margins; third segment with large, similar colored spots, confluent with the yellow in front but rounded on the internal posterior angles and don't reach the yellow of the hind margins; across the middle of the segment a metallic band gets cut across; elsewhere the black is opaque; fourth segment wholly shining, with a yellow hind margin and sometimes with a spot of black in front; hypopygium black. Female abdomens, in contrast to males, are mostly black; the second segment sometimes includes a small, opaque, red spot on the side, as in the male; the third and fourth segments sometimes have small opaque spots in front; on the second, third, and fourth segments, a broad, white pollinose may be located on the hind border; the hind margins are more narrowly red or yellow.

Eristalis wing

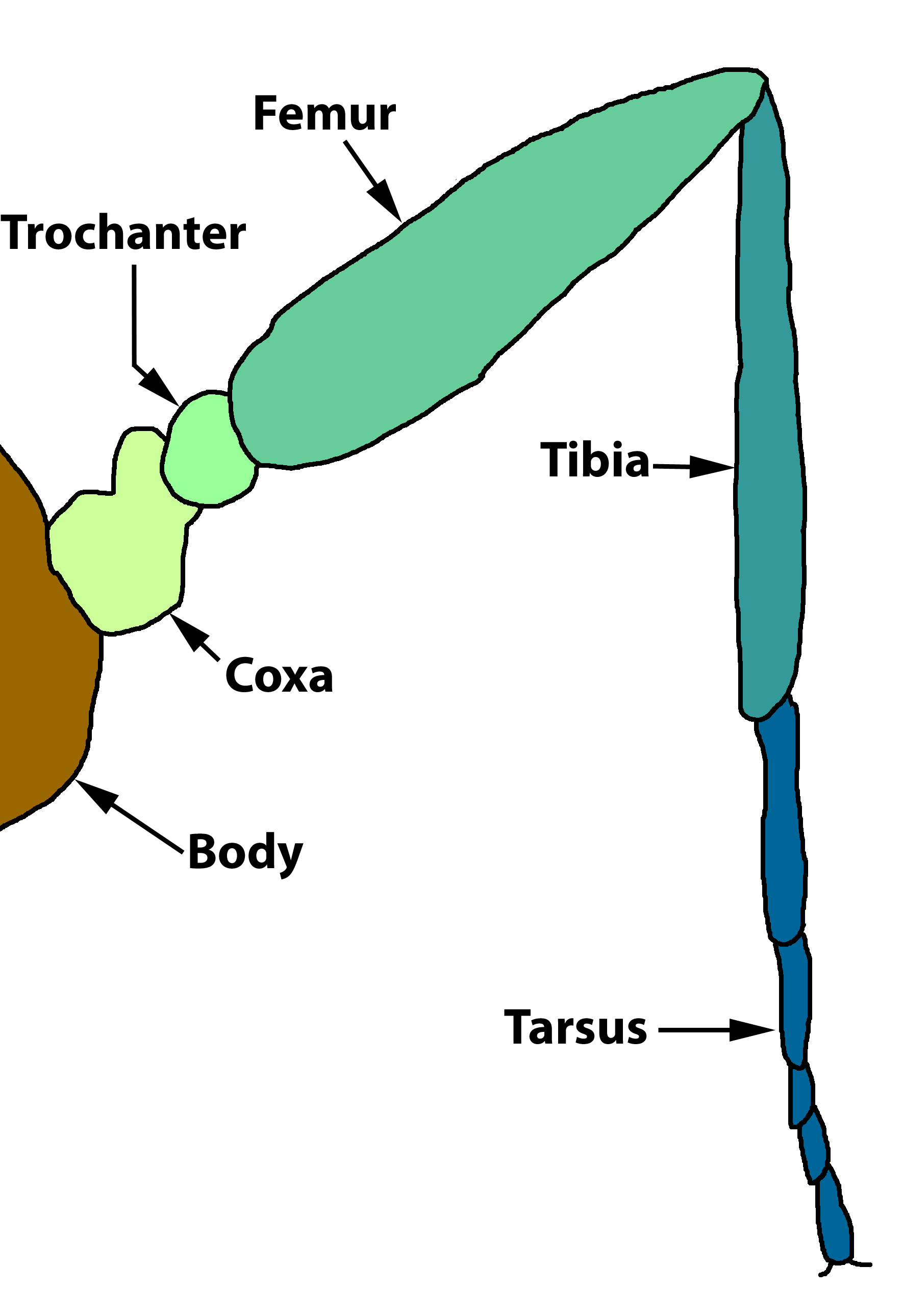
Insect leg

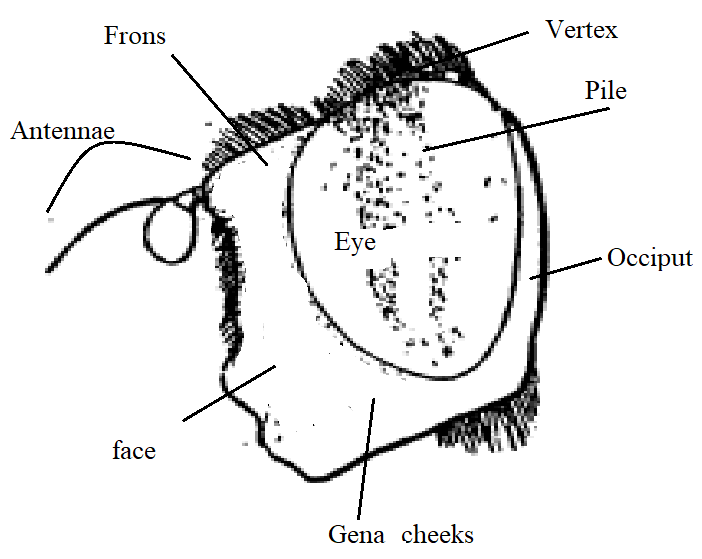
Eristalis head

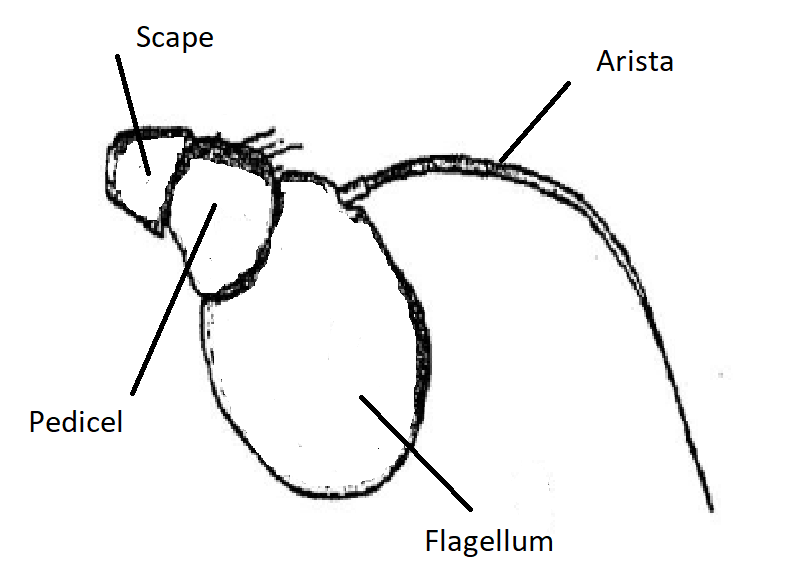
Syrphid antenna

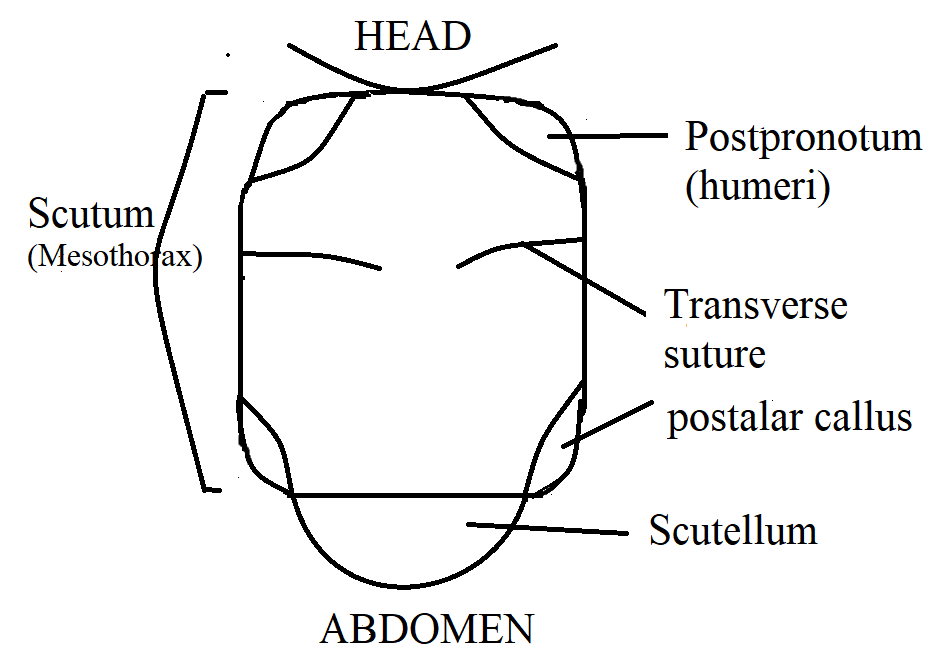
Dorsal view of Syrphid thorax

== Distribution ==
The population of E. brousii has suffered a large decline in North America since the introduction of the European species E. arbustorum near Toronto around 1885. As of 2019, E. brousii is only found along the lake margin of Hudson Bay.
