= Eristalis fraterculus =

Scientific classification
- Domain: Eukaryota
- Kingdom: Animalia
- Phylum: Arthropoda
- Class: Insecta
- Order: Diptera
- Family: Syrphidae
- Genus: Eristalis
- Species: E. fraterculus

Binomial name
- Eristalis fraterculus (Zetterstedt, 1838)

Synonyms
- Eristalis pilosa; Syrphus fraterculus

Species of fly

Eristalis fraterculus, the black-spotted drone fly, is a species of hoverfly with a holarctic distribution. It flies from early June to late October, and occurs in tundra and taiga.
