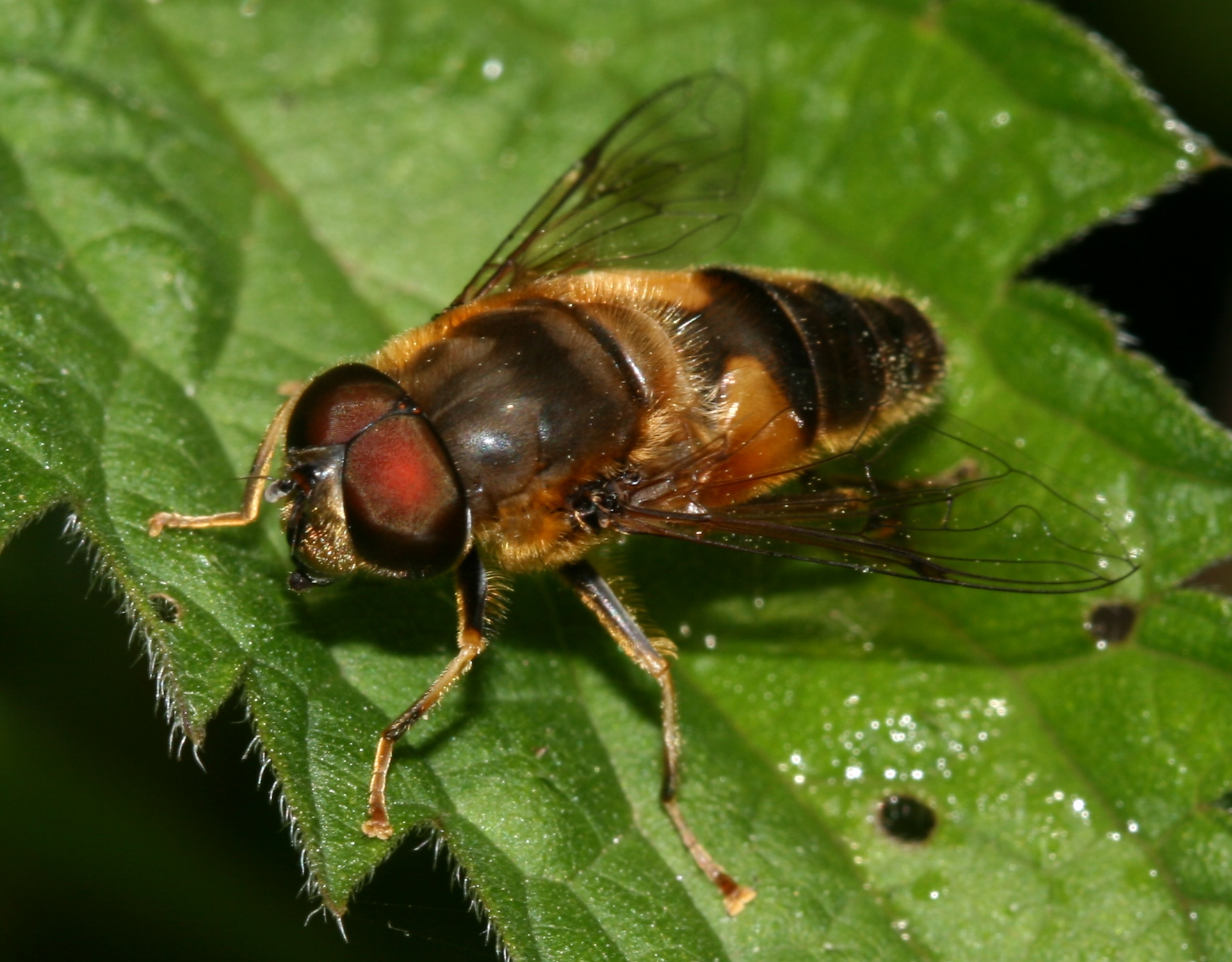
- male
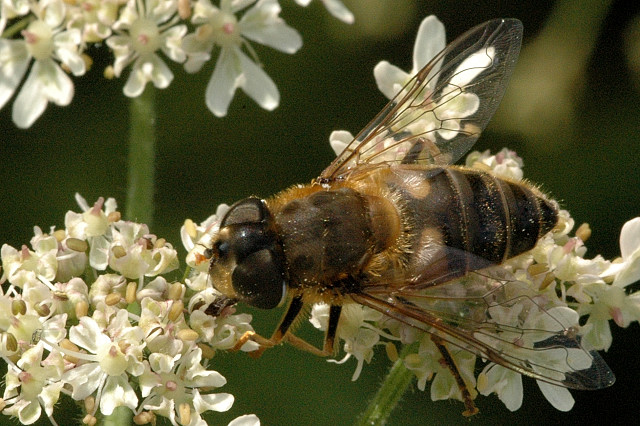
- female

Scientific classification
- Kingdom: Animalia
- Phylum: Arthropoda
- Clade: Pancrustacea
- Class: Insecta
- Order: Diptera
- Family: Syrphidae
- Genus: Eristalis
- Species: E. pertinax

Binomial name
- Eristalis pertinax (Scopoli, 1763)

Synonyms
- E. fossarum Meigen, 1822; Conops pertinax Scopoli, 1763

= Eristalis pertinax =

Species of fly

Eristalis pertinax is a hoverfly in the family Syrphidae. It was first described by Giovanni Antonio Scopoli in 1763 and is found in Asia and Europe. Like Eristalis tenax, the larvae of E. pertinax are rat-tailed maggots living in drainage ditches, pools around manure piles, sewage, and similar places containing water with high organic load and low oxygen concentration.

== Description ==
Wing length is 8.25–12.75 mm. Antennomere 3 brown-black. Arista plumose to tip. Tarsi 1 and 2 entirely yellow. Wing with diffusely bordered darkened median band and pterostigma four times as long as wide. Dimorphic (males with triangular abdomen, females with squarish abdomen). The male genitalia are figured by Hippa et al. (2001). The larva is figured by Hartley (1961).

== Distribution ==
Palaearctic: Fennoscandia south to Iberia and the Mediterranean basin. Ireland, east through Europe to Turkey and European Russia, east to the Urals.

== Biology ==
The habitat is wetland, forest, alluvial forest, fen, farmland, suburban gardens and parks. The flight period is February to November.

== Gallery ==
Females of a European hoverfly ovipositing at a small pool in a forest near Marburg, Hesse, Germany

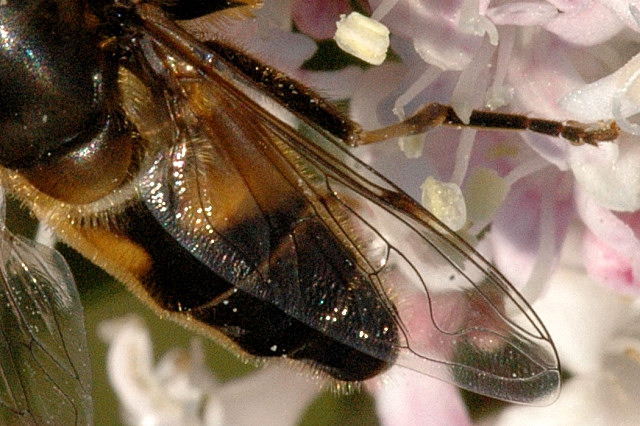
Wing detail

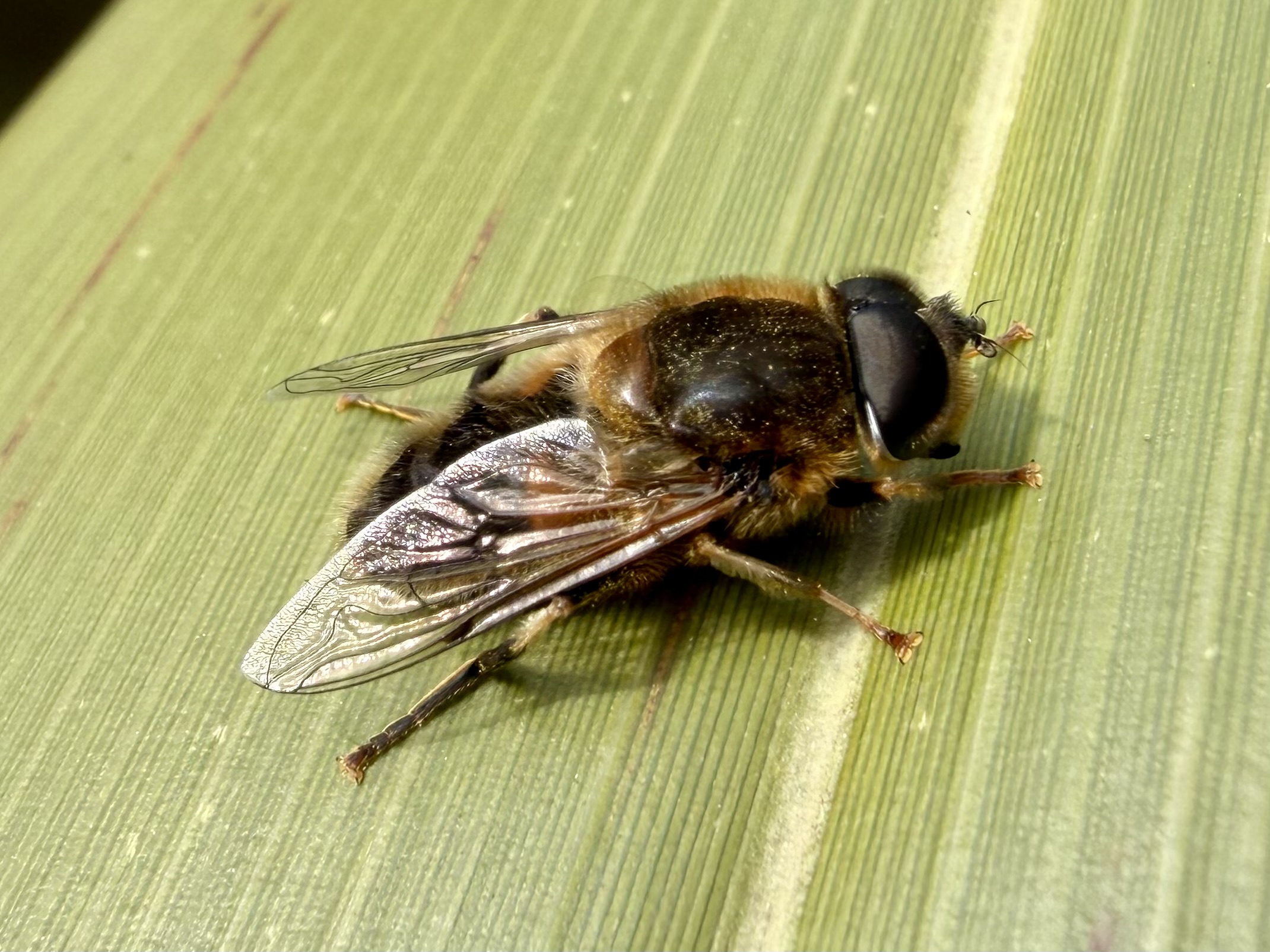
Male on a leaf
