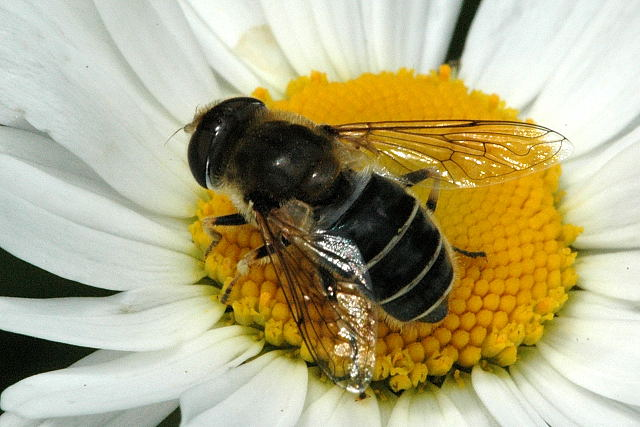
- Eristalis jugorum female

Scientific classification
- Kingdom: Animalia
- Phylum: Arthropoda
- Class: Insecta
- Order: Diptera
- Family: Syrphidae
- Genus: Eristalis
- Species: E. jugorum

Binomial name
- Eristalis jugorum Egger, 1925

= Eristalis jugorum =

Species of fly

Eristalis jugorum is a European species of hoverfly.
