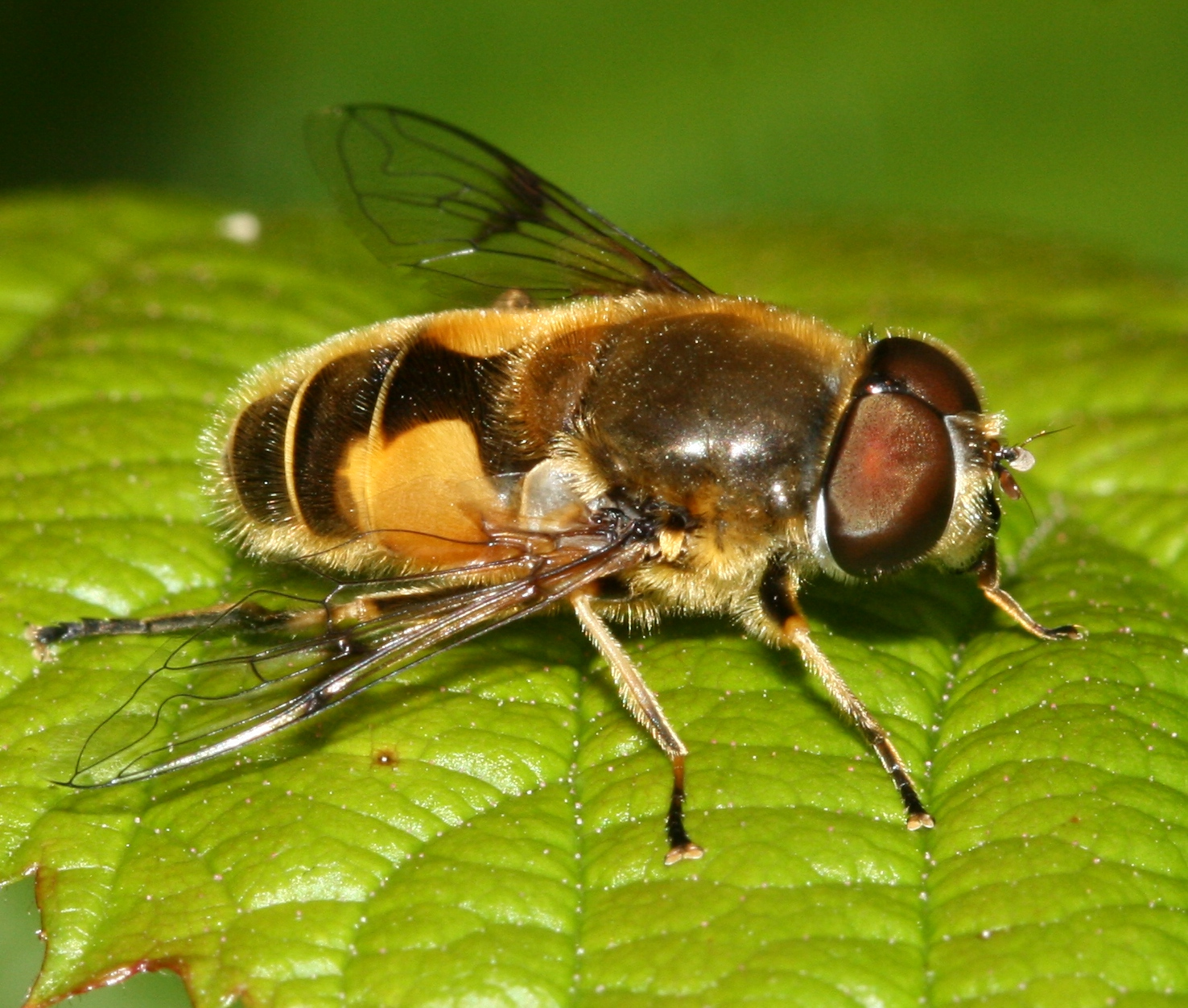
- Male
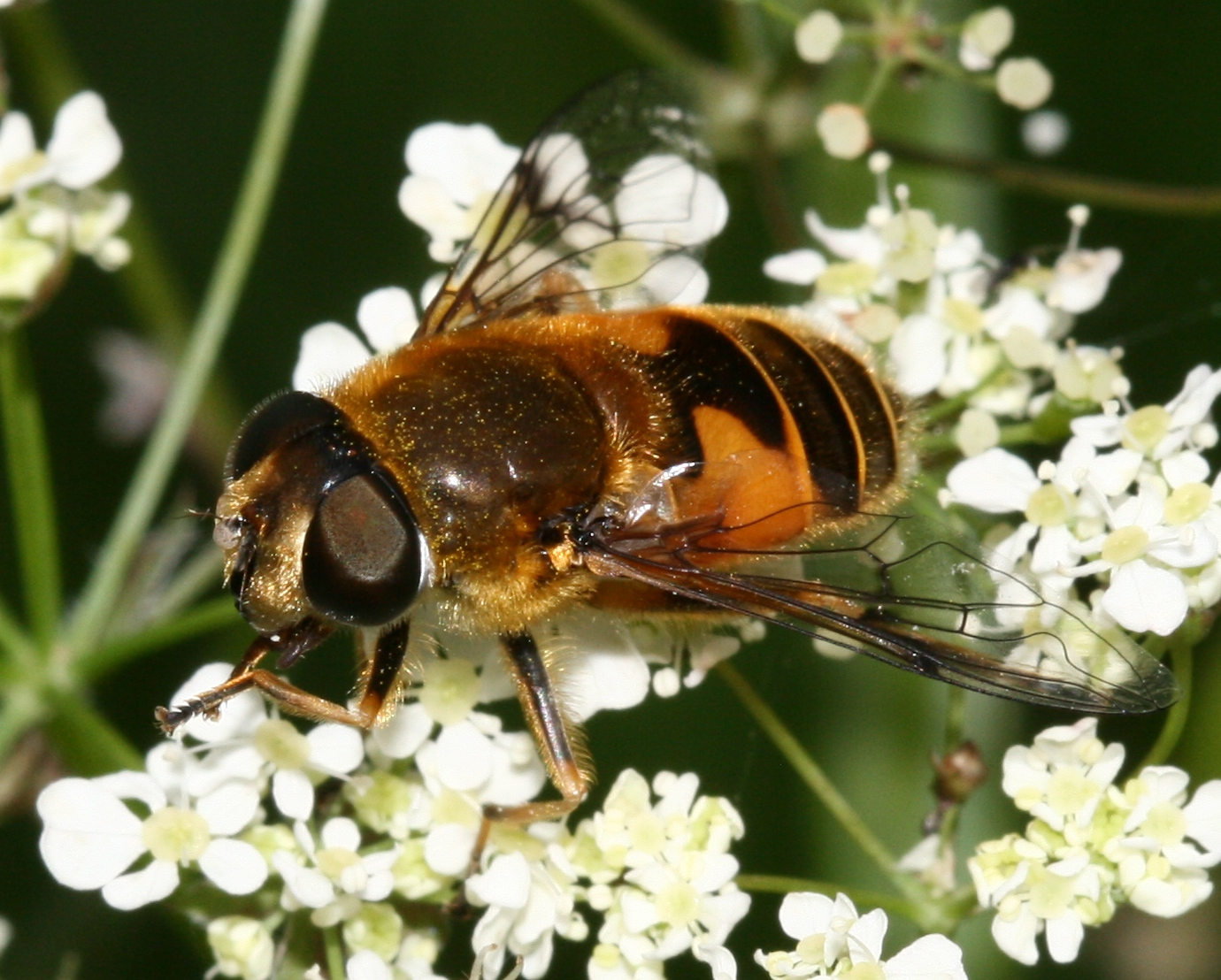
- Female

Scientific classification
- Kingdom: Animalia
- Phylum: Arthropoda
- Clade: Pancrustacea
- Class: Insecta
- Order: Diptera
- Family: Syrphidae
- Genus: Eristalis
- Subgenus: Eoseristalis
- Species: E. horticola

Binomial name
- Eristalis horticola (De Geer, 1776)

Synonyms
- E. cinctus (Harris, 1776); E. leneatus authors; E. lineatus (Harris, 1776); Musca cinctus (Harris, 1776); Musca horticola (De Geer, 1776); Musca lineatus (Harris, 1776)

= Eristalis horticola =

Species of fly

Eristalis horticola is a Palearctic species of hoverfly.

== Description ==
Eristalis horticola is a medium-sized hoverfly species, with an average wing length between 8·25-11·5 millimeters. The fly's face is pale and dusted with a broad black median stripe. Other identifying characteristics include brown-black markings on the third segment of the antennomere, dull coloring on the second tergite segment, and yellowish spotting present along the abdomen.

Eristalis horticola wings are pigmented with dark clouding. This trait is more developed in E. horticola females. In addition, the femur on the third pair of legs is pale at the base in males, and is pale on the basal half of these segments in females.

The larval form of this species is aquatic.

== Distribution ==
This species has a palearctic distribution. They can be found at their northernmost point in southern areas of the Fennoscandian peninsula, down to the Mediterranean basin and North Africa. Their range also extends from Ireland and continues east, as far as the island of Sakhalin. In addition, populations of Eristalis horticola have been found in India.

== Biology ==
Eristalis horticola can be found in areas where water is consistently present, such as wetland habitats, deciduous forests, temperate coniferous forests, taigas, montane tundras, fens, and cut-over valley bogs. They can also be found at the margins of pools, streams and rivers.

Like other hoverfly species, E. horticola feed on the nectar and pollen produced by flowers. These flowers include yellow composites, white umbellifers, Compositae, Ranunculaceae, and Umbelliferae, Calluna vulgaris, Cardamine, Cirsium, Crataegus, Eupatorium, Galium, Jasione, Pyrus communis, Ranunculus, Rubus fruticosus, Rubus idaeus, Sambucus, Sorbus aucuparia, Stellaria, Succisa, and Viburnum opulus.

This species can be found flying from May to September.

== Scientific name ==
The scientific name of this species was published as Musca horticola in 1776 by Charles De Geer. The name has been in general use as Eristalis horticola (De Geer, 1776) in the two centuries following its publication. On the basis of a colour plate of Musca lineata by Moses Harris, also published in 1776, the latter name was generally accepted as a junior synonym of Musca horticola.

At the end of the twentieth century, some entomologists noted that De Geer erroneously listed Musca nemorum (Linnaeus, 1758) as a synonym under Musca horticola, which would invalidate the name. As a result of some confusion about the type material of Musca nemorum, some entomologists already regarded that name as a synonym of Musca arbustorum (Linnaeus, 1758.) The same authors placed Musca horticola in the synonymy of Eristalis arbustorum. They proposed to use the next available scientific names for both species, and to use the name Eristalis interrupta (Poda, 1761) for the species known until then as Eristalis nemorum, and to use the name Eristalis lineata (Harris, 1776) for the species known as Eristalis horticola for over two centuries. In 2004, entomologists Peter Chandler, Andrew Wakeham-Dawson and Angus McCullough submitted a request to the International Commission on Zoological Nomenclature to conserve both names with a neotype. The request was granted less than two years after its submission. In various overviews, including Fauna Europaea, the names proposed by Thompson et al. are still published.
