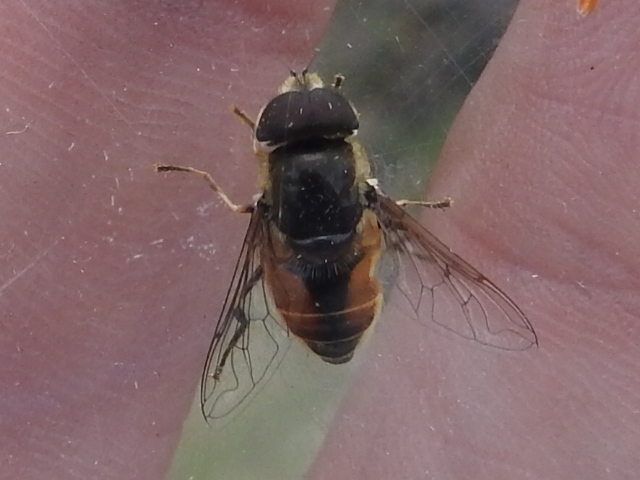
- image of Eristalis bellardii

Scientific classification
- Kingdom: Animalia
- Phylum: Arthropoda
- Clade: Pancrustacea
- Class: Insecta
- Order: Diptera
- Family: Syrphidae
- Genus: Eristalis
- Species: E. bellardii

Binomial name
- Eristalis bellardii Jaennicke, 1867

= Eristalis bellardii =

Species of fly

Eristalis bellardii, the Mexican mountain drone fly, is an uncommon species of syrphid fly first officially described by Jaennicke in 1867. It is infrequently found in the Southwestern United States, Mexico and Central America. In appearance it is somewhat like that of a honeybee. Hoverflies get their names from the ability to remain nearly motionless while in flight. The adults are also known as flower flies for they are commonly found around and on flowers, from which they get both energy-giving nectar and protein-rich pollen.

== Description ==
External images For terms see Morphology of Diptera

Head
Black with face sometimes reddish brown laterally covered with yellowish-white pollen except for the shiny central stripe extend nearly to the antennae.: The gena is shiny with pale yellow pile. The frontal lunule is reddish brown. Antenna with a bare arista. The pile of the eye is brownish yellow but white ventrally. Male eyes touch along center while female eyes are separate.
Thorax
Black with yellow pile except the central part of the scutellum which has black pile over a reddish-brown base.
Wings
Hyaline with a yellow pilose tegula.
Abdomen
First tergum black, second tergum dull, orange on lateral 2/3, black on medial 1/3. Third tergum similar to second tergum in the male but the female orange on lateral is only about 1/3 the width. Fourth tergum in male orange on lateral 1/3 but in female entirely black.
Genitalia
Figure #9 in [=https://www.biodiversitylibrary.org/item/54855#page/228/mode/1up]
Larvae
Unknown
