= Bill Gates' flower fly =

Scientific classification
- Kingdom: Animalia
- Phylum: Arthropoda
- Clade: Pancrustacea
- Class: Insecta
- Order: Diptera
- Family: Syrphidae
- Genus: Eristalis
- Species: E. gatesi

Binomial name
- Eristalis gatesi Thompson, 1997

Flower fly endemic to Costa Rica

Bill Gates' flower fly (Eristalis gatesi) is a flower fly endemic to Costa Rica named after Bill Gates. Another fly found in similar habitats was named after Gates' associate Paul Allen, called Paul Allen's flower fly (Eristalis alleni); according to Chris Thompson, the describer of these species, both names were in "recognition of [their] great contributions to the PC revolution".

== See also ==
- List of organisms named after famous people (born 1950–1974)
