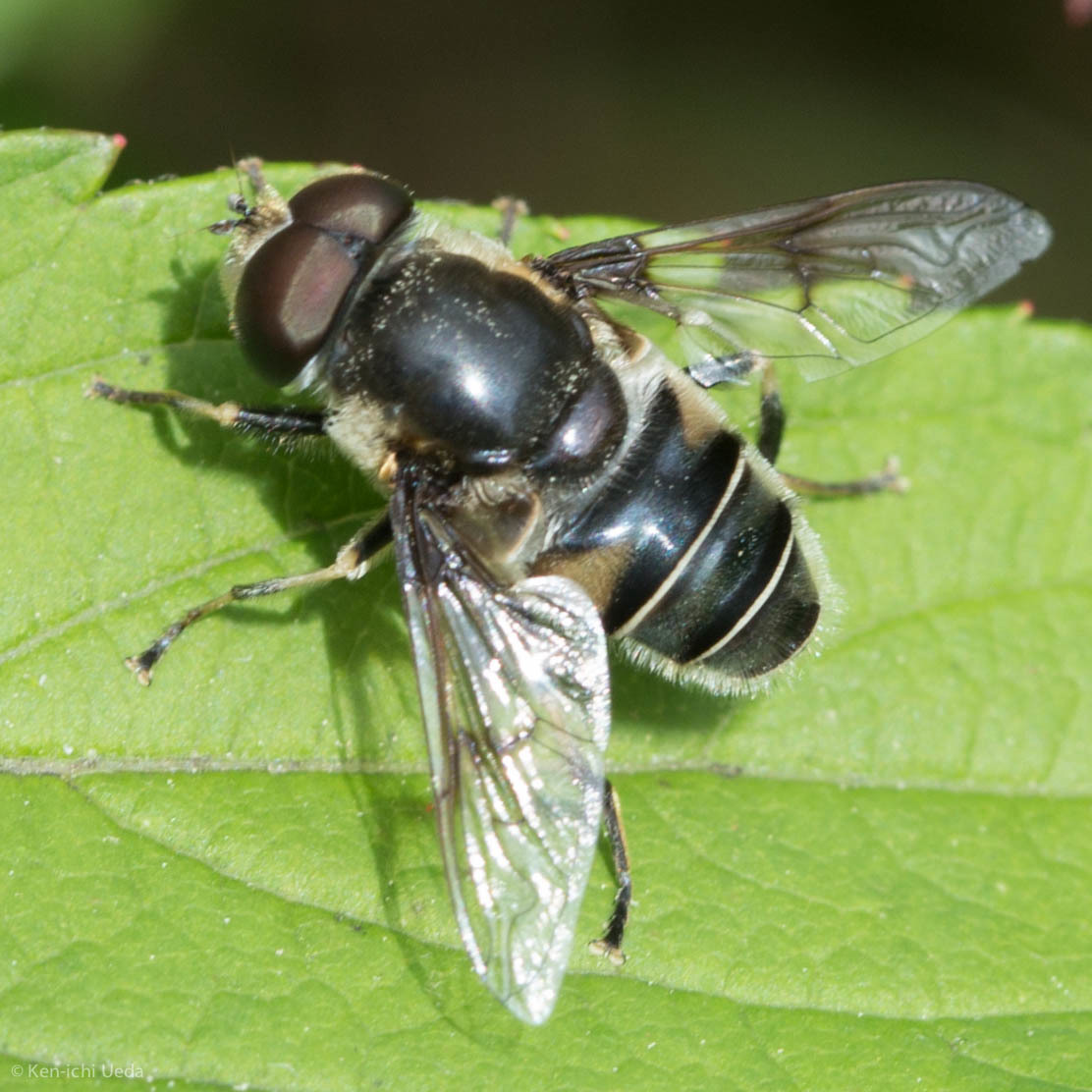

Scientific classification
- Kingdom: Animalia
- Phylum: Arthropoda
- Clade: Pancrustacea
- Class: Insecta
- Order: Diptera
- Family: Syrphidae
- Genus: Eristalis
- Species: E. saxorum

Binomial name
- Eristalis saxorum Wiedemann, 1830

= Eristalis saxorum =

Species of fly

Eristalis saxorum ( Wiedemann, 1830 ), the Blue-polished Drone Fly, is an uncommon species of syrphid fly found along the Eastern United States. Hoverflies get their names from the ability to remain nearly motionless while in flight. The adults are also known as flower flies for they are commonly found around and on flowers, from which they get both energy-giving nectar and protein-rich pollen. The larvae are aquatic filter-feeders of the rat-tailed type. The larvae of this species have not been identified. Little is known about this uncommon species which flies from mid-March to late October.
