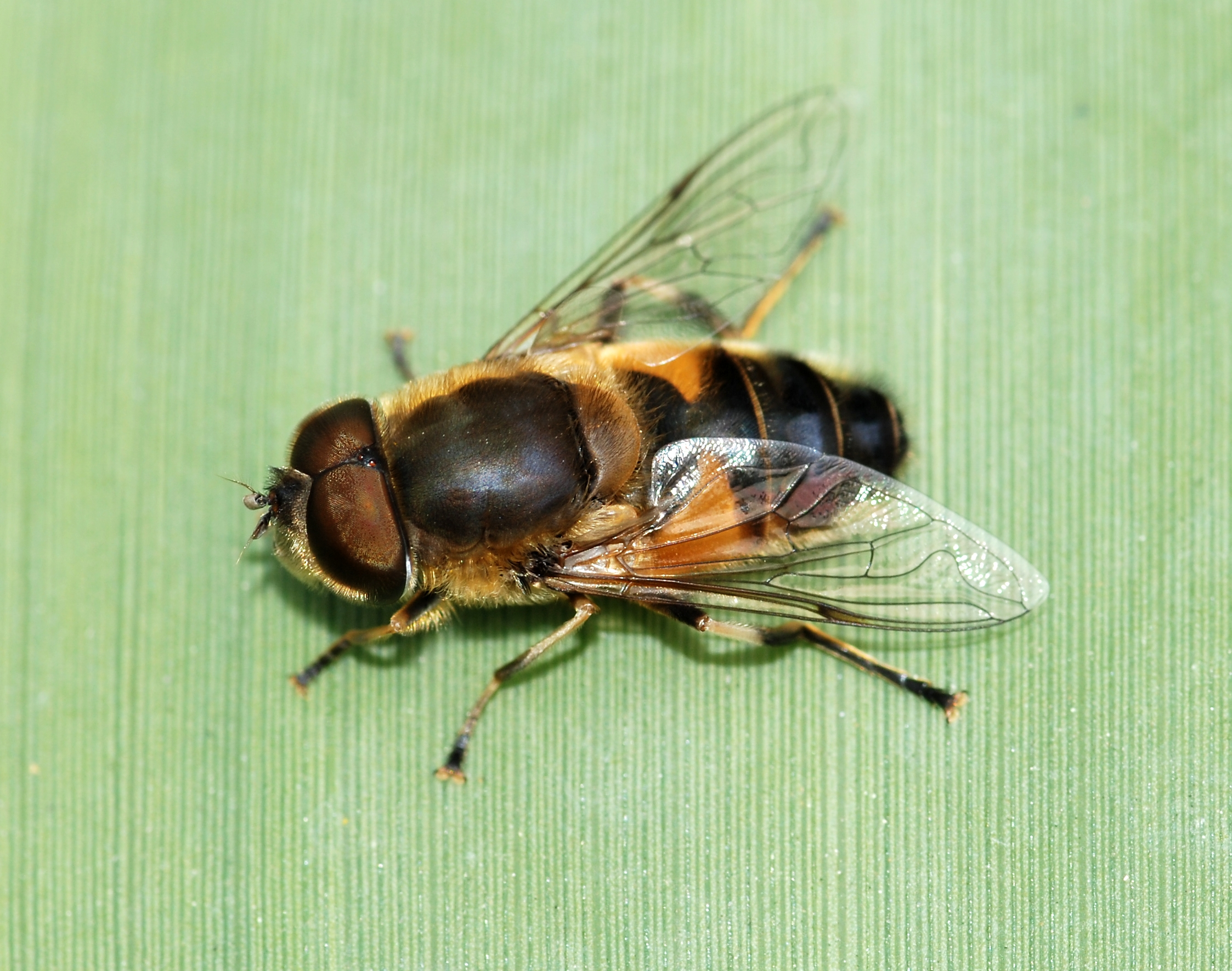
- male

Scientific classification
- Domain: Eukaryota
- Kingdom: Animalia
- Phylum: Arthropoda
- Class: Insecta
- Order: Diptera
- Family: Syrphidae
- Genus: Eristalis
- Species: E. similis

Binomial name
- Eristalis similis (Fallén, 1817)

Synonyms
- E. pratorum Meigen, 1822; Syrphus similis Fallén, 1817

= Eristalis similis =

Species of fly

Eristalis similis is a Palearctic species of hoverfly.
