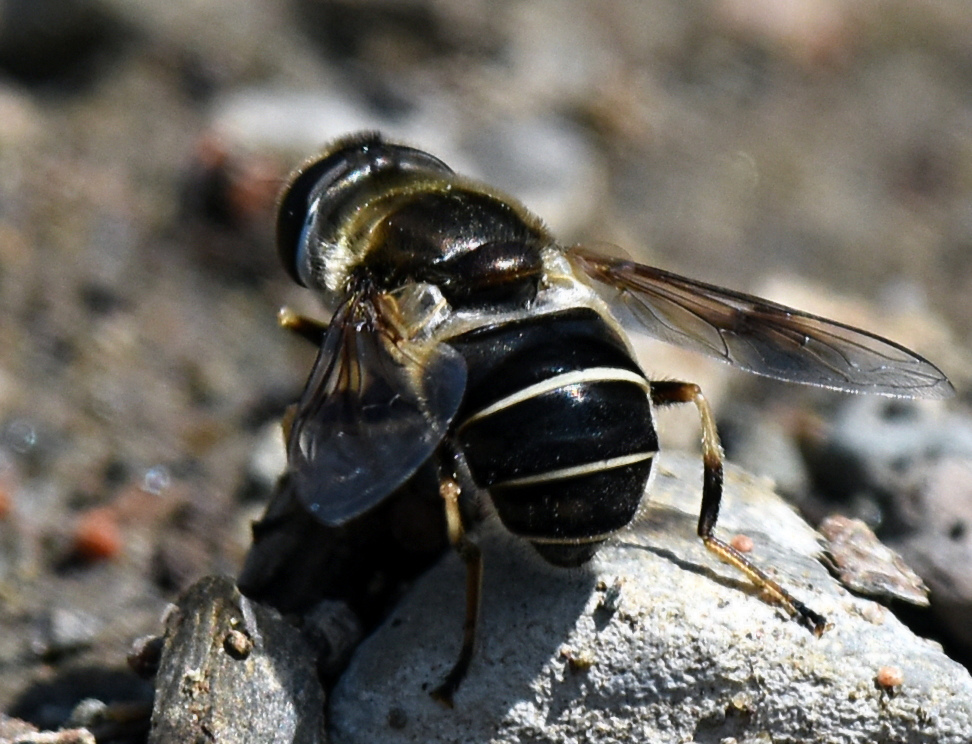

Scientific classification
- Domain: Eukaryota
- Kingdom: Animalia
- Phylum: Arthropoda
- Class: Insecta
- Order: Diptera
- Family: Syrphidae
- Genus: Eristalis
- Species: E. obscura

Binomial name
- Eristalis obscura (Loew, 1866)

Synonyms
- Eristalis beltrami Telford, 1949; Eristalis obscurus Loew, 1866; Eristalis vandykei Nayar and Cole, 1969

= Eristalis obscura =

Species of fly

Eristalis obscura, the dusky drone fly, is a common species of syrphid fly first officially described by Loew in 1866. This species is widespread in the northern part of North America and Europe east to Siberia. The larvae are aquatic filter-feeders of the rat-tailed type.
