= Paul Allen's flower fly =

Scientific classification
- Kingdom: Animalia
- Phylum: Arthropoda
- Class: Insecta
- Order: Diptera
- Family: Syrphidae
- Genus: Eristalis
- Subgenus: Eoseristalis
- Species: E. alleni

Binomial name
- Eristalis alleni Thompson, 1997

Species of fly

Paul Allen's flower fly (Eristalis alleni) is a flower fly found only in Costa Rican forests in the central highlands. It was named after Paul Allen. Another fly was also named after Allen's associate Bill Gates, Bill Gates' flower fly (Eristalis gatesi).

It is similar in appearance to Eristalis circe Williston, 1891 and Eristalis persa Williston, 1891, but has different leg colouration.

== Biology ==
Little is known of its biology, but most adults are found in association with flowers in the genus Senecio.
