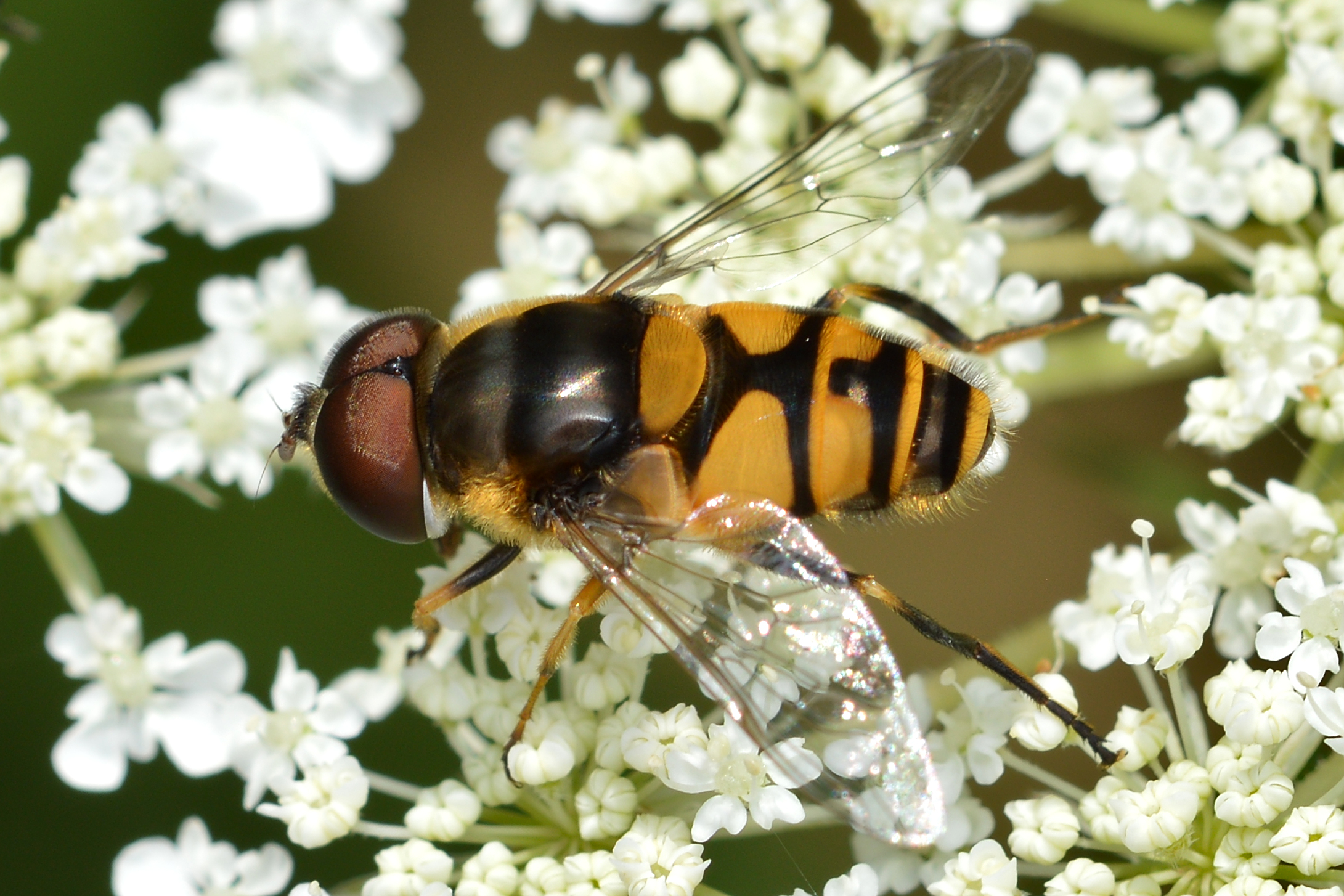
- Male
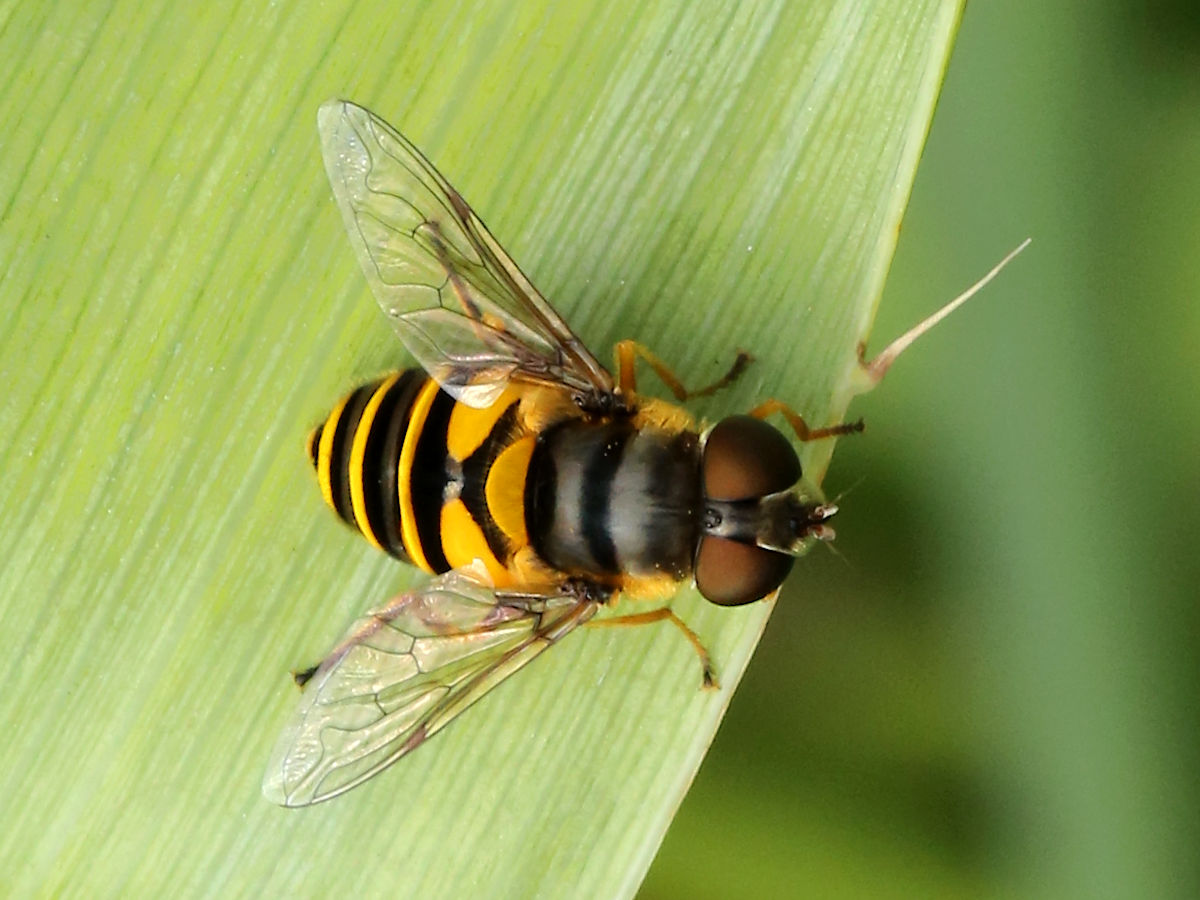
- Female

Scientific classification
- Kingdom: Animalia
- Phylum: Arthropoda
- Class: Insecta
- Order: Diptera
- Family: Syrphidae
- Genus: Eristalis
- Species: E. transversa

Binomial name
- Eristalis transversa (Wiedemann, 1830)

Synonyms
- Eristalis fascicollis Say, 1835; Eristalis philadelphicus Macquart, 1842; Eristalis pumilus Macquart, 1842; Eristalis transversus Wiedemann, 1830; Eristalis vittata Macquart, 1834; Eristalis zonatus Bigot, 1880; Eristalomyia calomera Bigot, 1880

= Eristalis transversa =

Species of fly

Eristalis transversa, the transverse banded drone fly, is a common species of hoverfly first officially described by Wiedemann in 1830. Hoverflies get their names from the ability to remain nearly motionless while in flight. The adults are also known as flower flies for they are commonly found around and on flowers, from which they get both energy-giving nectar and protein-rich pollen. The larvae are rat-tailed type but larvae of this specific species has not been reported.

== Distribution ==
external map Species reported from North America east of the Mississippi River and into Southeastern Canada.

== Description ==
For terms see Morphology of Diptera. external images

Size
7–12 mm (0.28–0.47 in)

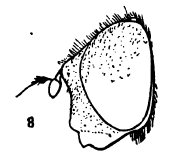

Head
The eyes are pilose on upper half and broadly contiguous in the male. The front is black, shining in the middle, black pile on the sides. The female also with black pile, narrowed above but on the lower two-thirds reddish pollinose. The antennae are reddish yellow. The basal portion of arista sparsely plumose. The sides of the face covered with dense whitish pollen and whitish pile, the median stripe (tubercle) and cheeks are shining black.
Thorax

The notum is opaque black, with three grayish olive transverse bands. The pleurae covered with thick yellow pile. The scutellum is bright yellow, with narrow black along its base.

Abdomen

The first segment black; second segment with large yellow lateral triangles (smaller in the female), and narrow posterior yellow ring, against a black background that extending narrowly to the lateral margins; third segment with large spots on the sides in front connected by a yellow ring against a black background a yellow ring borders the rear of the segment. The female has only a posterior yellow ring on a black background. Fourth segment with a small yellow spot on the front quarters, and a posterior yellow ring, remainder of the segment opaque black with an entire shining cross-band before the middle of the segment. The female has only a posterior yellow ring on a black background. Hypopygium shining black.

Wings

The wings are hyaline. The basal portion a little yellowish. Noteworthy veination - Spurious vein (sv), looping of R_{4+5} into r_{4+5}, closed cell r_{2+3}.anterior cross- vein (r-m) near the middle of discal cell (dm), oblique.

Legs

The legs are variably coloured usually black with the tip of femora and base of tibiae yellow. Sometimes the distal half of all the femora and the base of bind tibiae, femora, and the larger portion of the tarsi are yellow or more rarely the front and middle legs may be almost wholly yellow and the black confined to outer part of bind femora. The tip of the hind tibiae, and tip of all the tarsi??

Eristalis wing

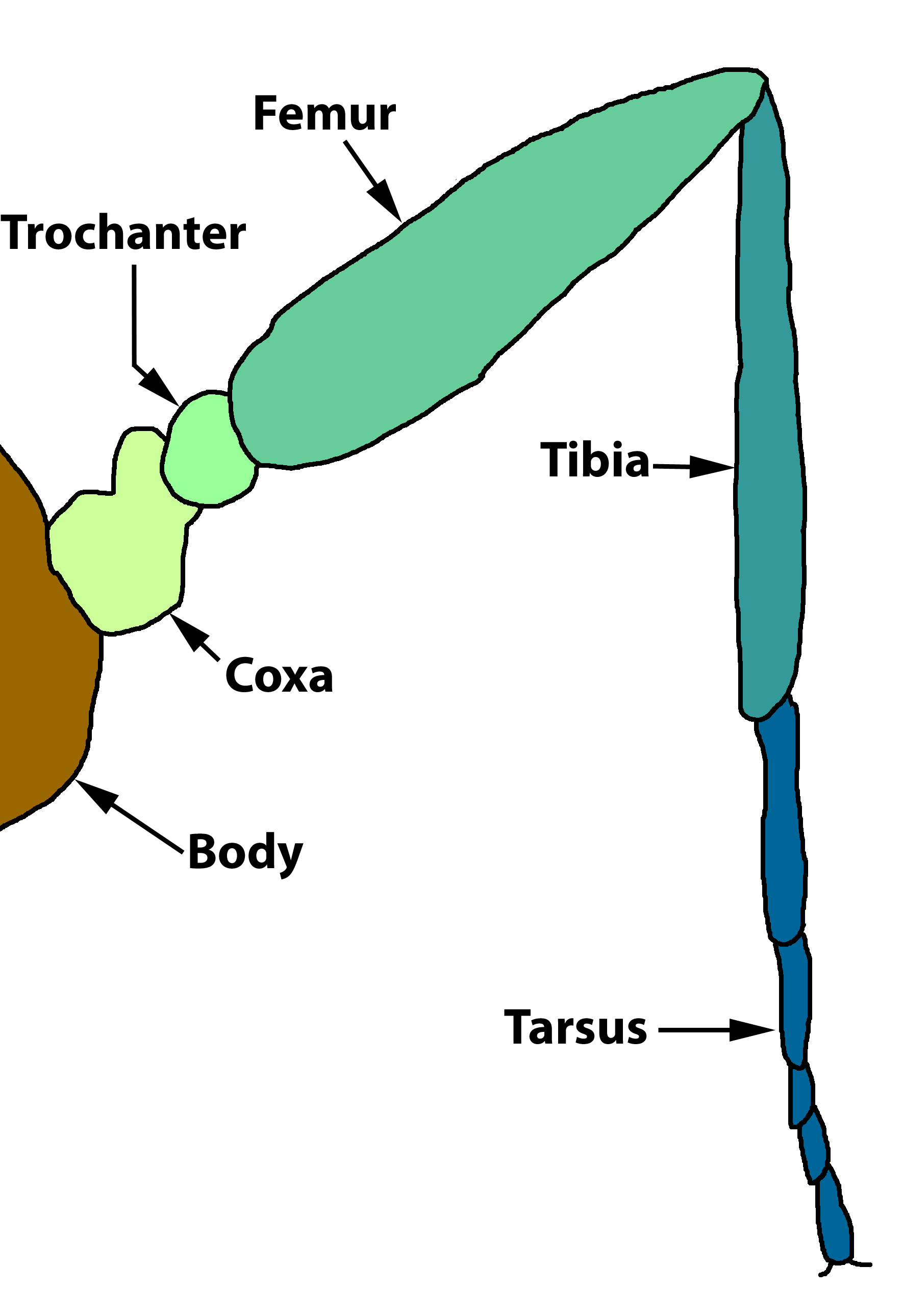
Insect leg

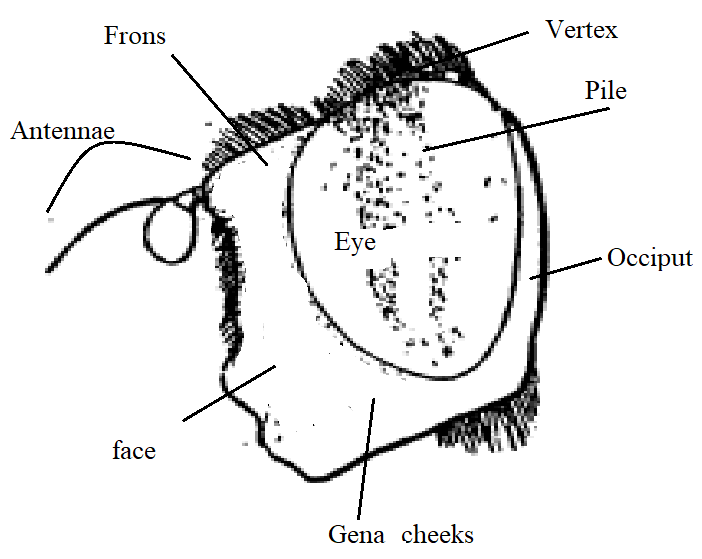
Eritalis head

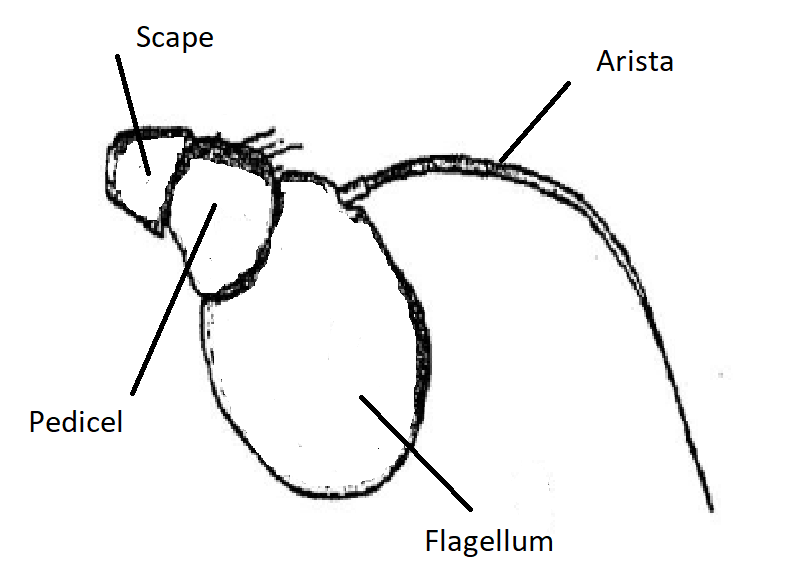
Antenna syrphid

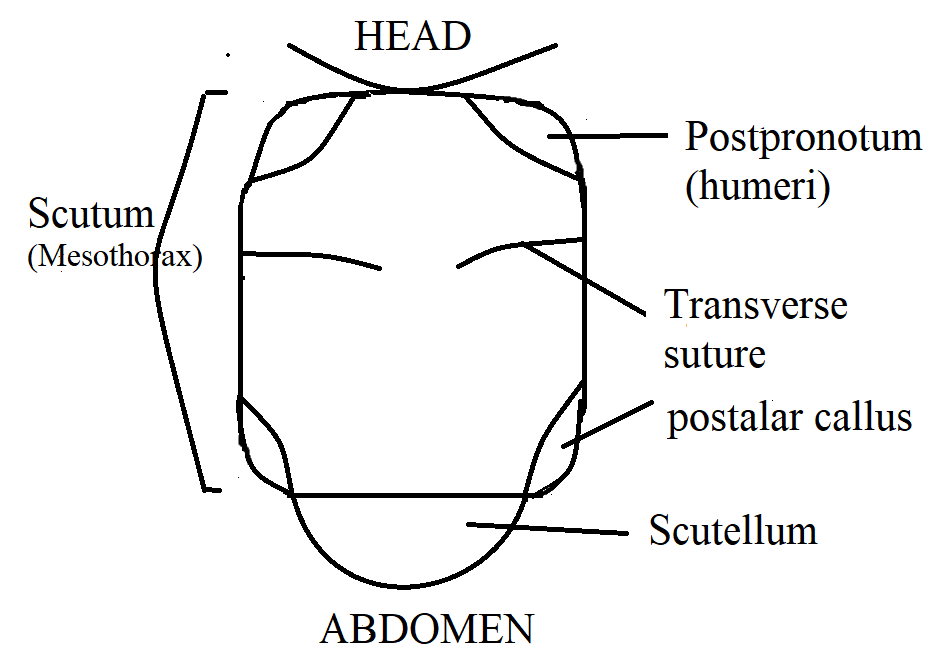
dorsal view of Syrphid thorax
