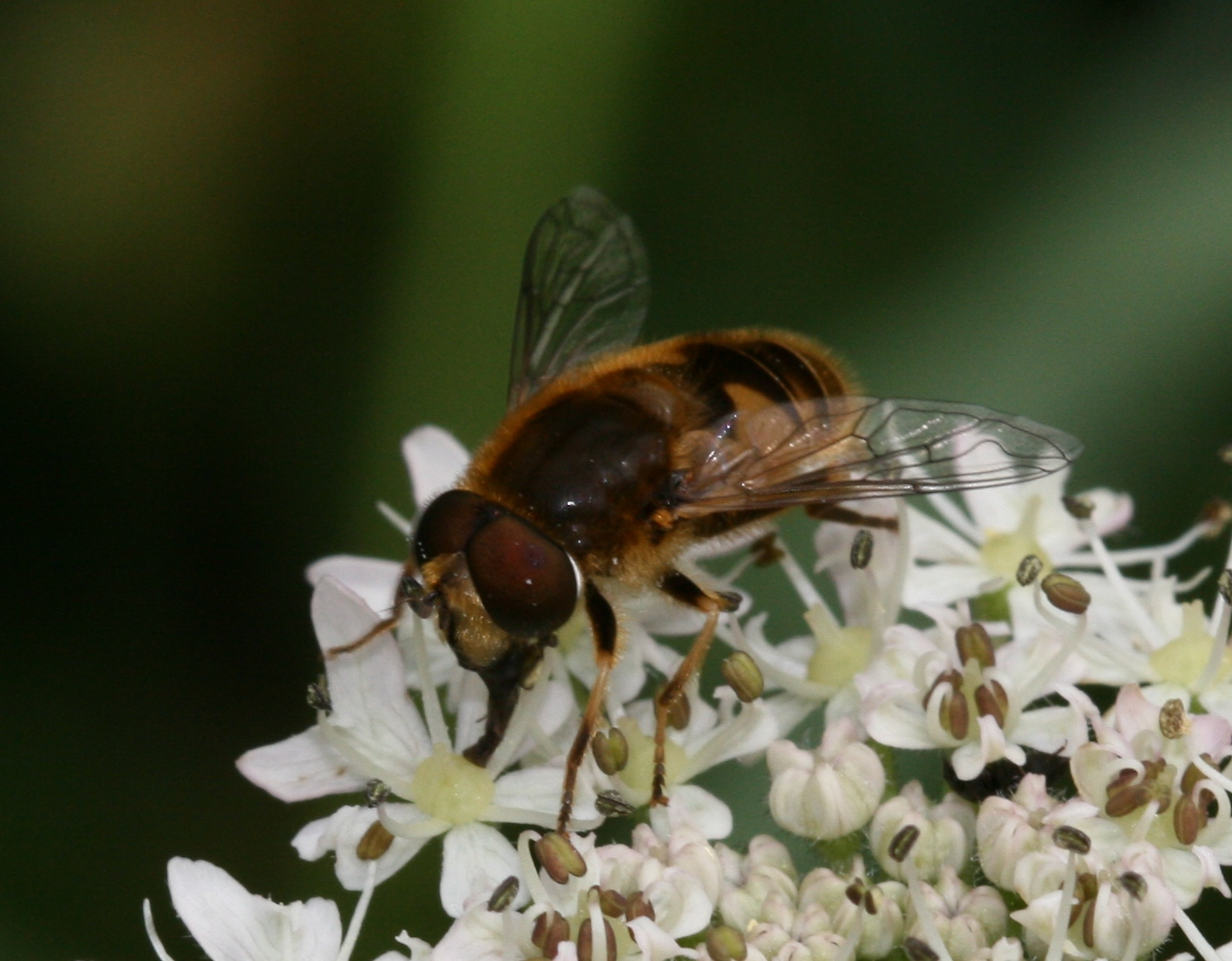
- Male
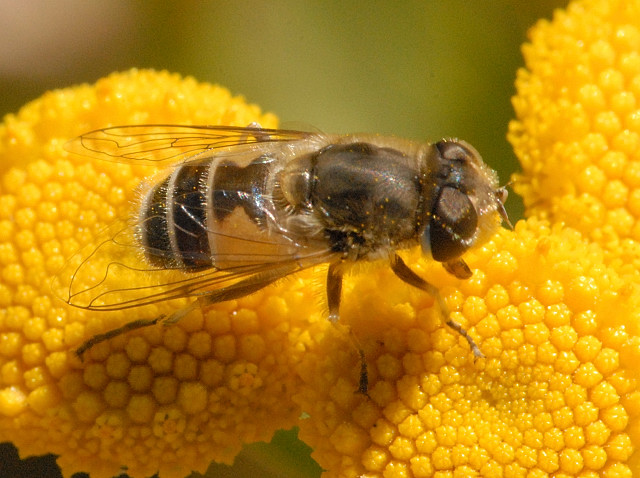
- Female

Scientific classification
- Kingdom: Animalia
- Phylum: Arthropoda
- Class: Insecta
- Order: Diptera
- Family: Syrphidae
- Genus: Eristalis
- Species: E. abusiva

Binomial name
- Eristalis abusiva Collin, 1931

= Eristalis abusiva =

Species of fly

Eristalis abusiva is a European species of hoverfly. It is similar to Eristalis arbustorum.

== Description ==
The wings are 8-9.5 mm in length. The scutellum is shiny. The face is covered with pale dust (there is a narrow black stripe here in worn specimens) on the lower part. The apical half of the arista is bare and the basal half is very short-haired. The eyes have pale yellow hairs. The female eyes are separated. The tibia are pale black on the basal quarter or less. Tibia 2 is very pale. The male genitalia are figured by Hippa et al. (2001). The larva is figured by Hartley (1961).

== Distribution ==
Eristalis abusiva occurs from Palaearctic Fennoscandia and the Faroes (Jensen, 2001) south to North France, from Ireland eastwards through Europe and Russia to the Pacific coast.

== Biology ==
The habitat is wetland, coastal fen and salt-marsh, marsh and fen, raised bog and cutover bog. Flowers visited include yellow composites, white umbellifers, Calluna vulgaris, Caltha, Cirsium, Erica, Potentilla erecta, Ranunculus, Rubus fruticosus, Salix repens, Stellaria, Spartina.

The flight period is beginning May to mid October. The larva is aquatic.
