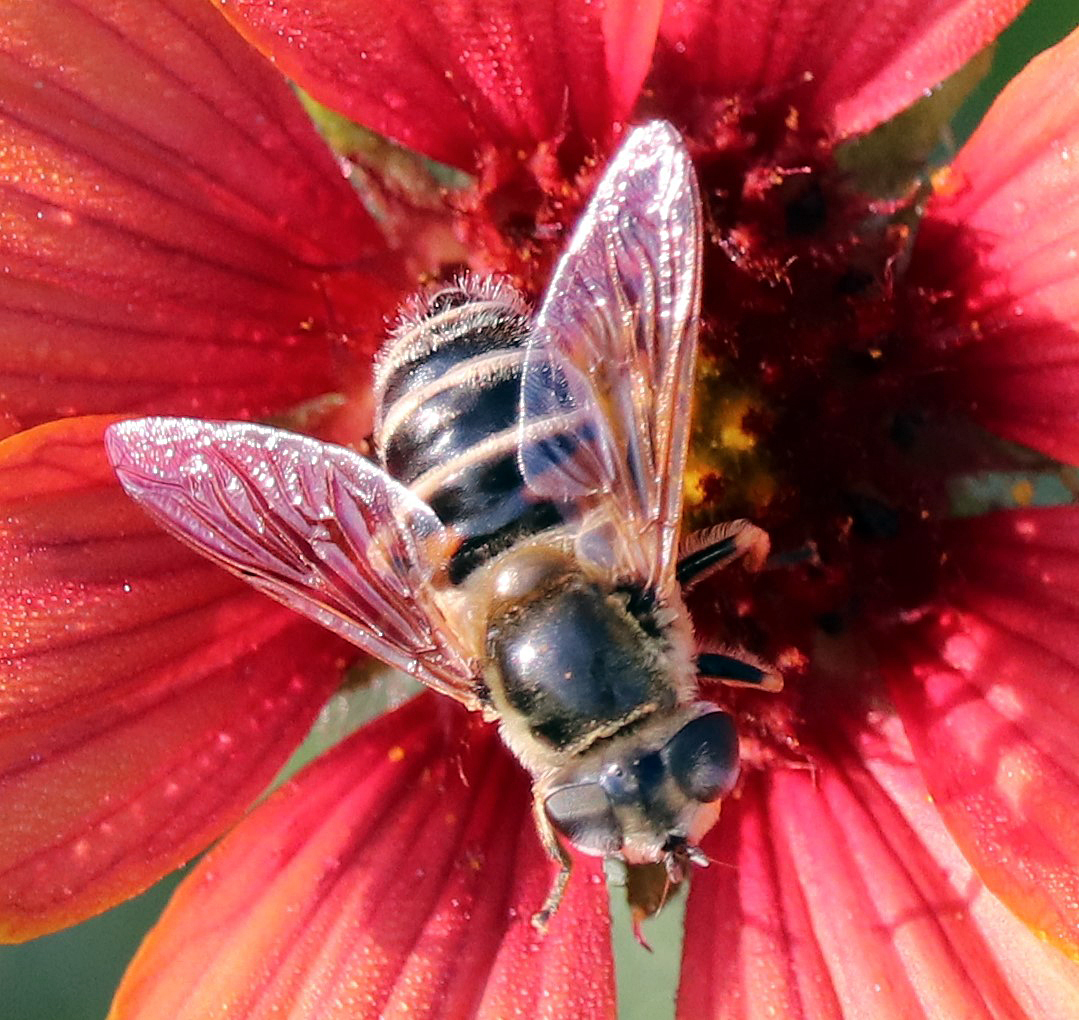
- Adult female E. stipator

Scientific classification
- Domain: Eukaryota
- Kingdom: Animalia
- Phylum: Arthropoda
- Class: Insecta
- Order: Diptera
- Family: Syrphidae
- Genus: Eristalis
- Species: E. stipator

Binomial name
- Eristalis stipator Osten Sacken, 1877

Synonyms
- Eristalis californicus Nayar and Cole, 1969; Eristalis latifrons Loew, 1866

= Eristalis stipator =

Species of insect

Eristalis stipator, the yellow-shouldered drone fly, is a species of hoverfly native to North America. It is abundant in western North America, with a few scattered records in the east. It flies from mid-May (or as early as February in the south of its range) to early November, and is known to hilltop.

== Description ==
E. stipator varies in appearance, with darker individuals sometimes resembling E. dimidiata, and males sometimes resembling species such as E. arbustorum or E. hirta. The wings are hyaline, with small brown pterostigma, with the basal half of their wings reddish-brown in color. Their third tergite is shiny black, and they have long white setae on the fourth tergite, forming a distinct band in front of the posterior margin of the tergite. Their setae give the appearance of coming to a point in the center of the third and fourth tergites. Females have a frons that is entirely silvery-white, except for a black median stripe, running from the base of their antennae to the end of the head.

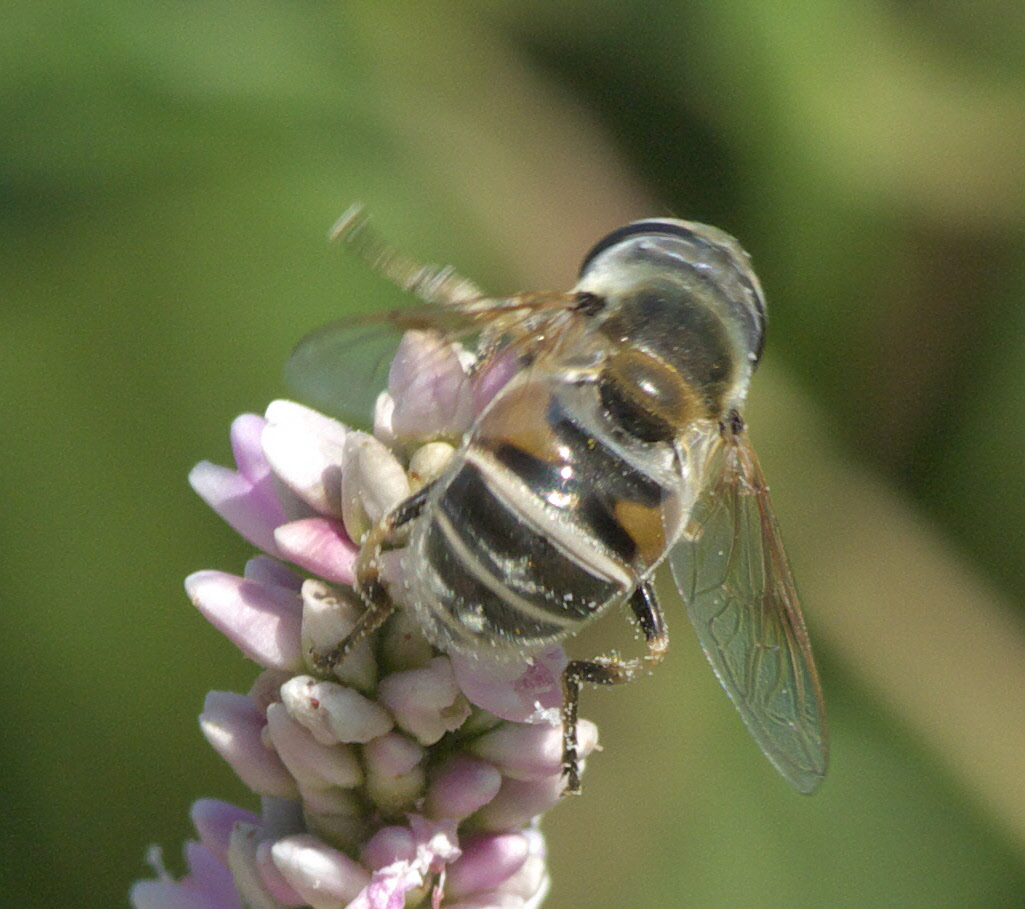
An E. stipator with its abdomen visible, showing the long white pile/setae on the third and fourth tergites forming narrow bands that come to a point, and showing that the third tergite is shiny black.

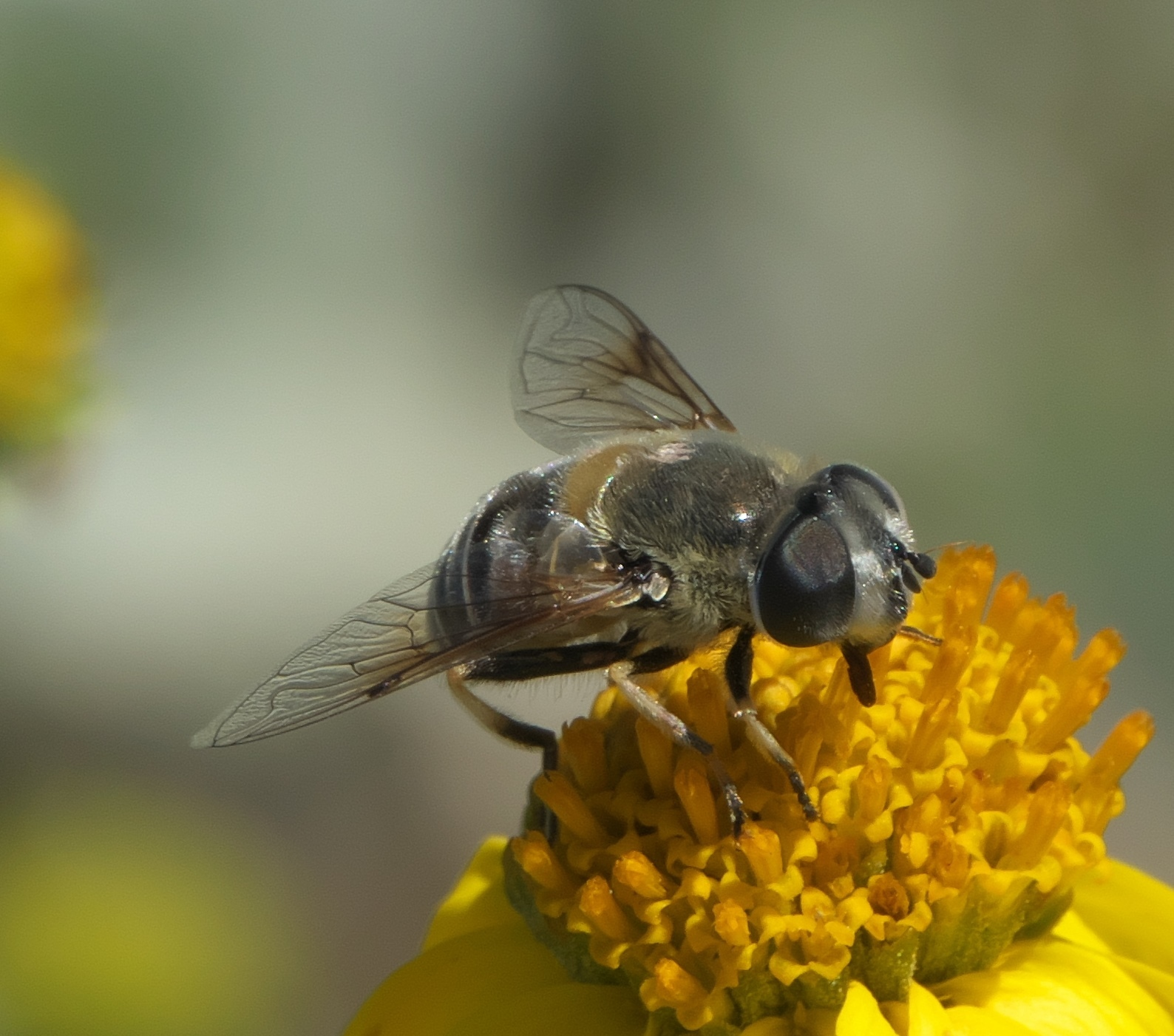
A female E. stipator showing the distinctive face of females of this species - the frons is extensively silvery-white setose except for a narrow black median stripe.
