= Eristalis oestracea =

Scientific classification
- Kingdom: Animalia
- Phylum: Arthropoda
- Class: Insecta
- Order: Diptera
- Family: Syrphidae
- Genus: Eristalis
- Subgenus: Eoseristalis
- Species: E. oestracea

Binomial name
- Eristalis oestracea (Linnaeus, 1758)

Synonyms
- Musca oestracea Linnaeus, 1758

Species of fly

Eristalis oestracea, the orange-tailed drone fly, is a species of hoverfly native to Europe and North America. In Europe it is found in bogs, moors, and coastal dunes. It nectars on white flowers in the carrot family (Apiaceae) and yellow flowers in the aster family (Asteraceae). It is very poorly known in North America. E. oestracea measures 14-15 mm in length.
