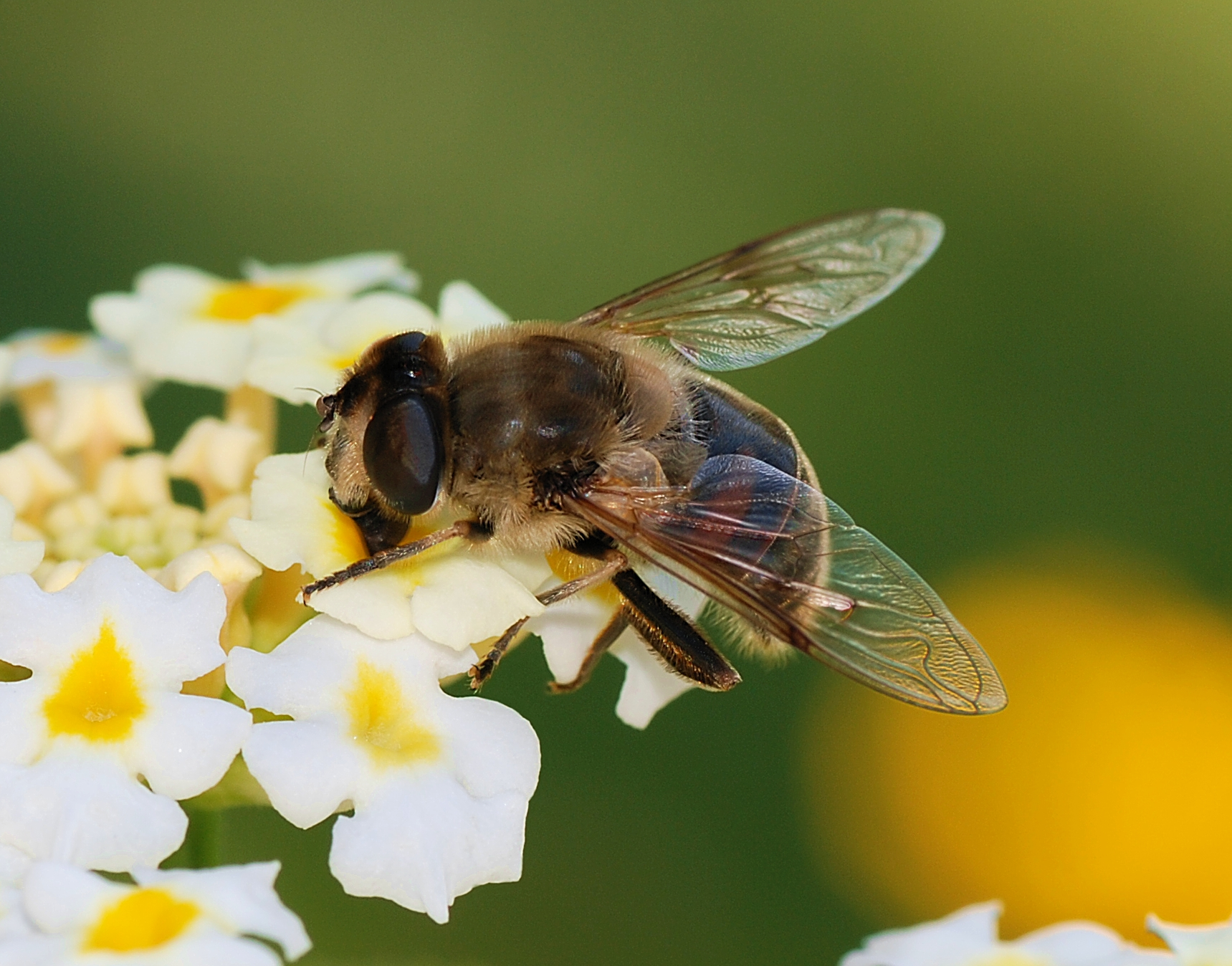
- Common drone fly (Eristalis tenax) on the flowers of a common lantana (Lantana camara)
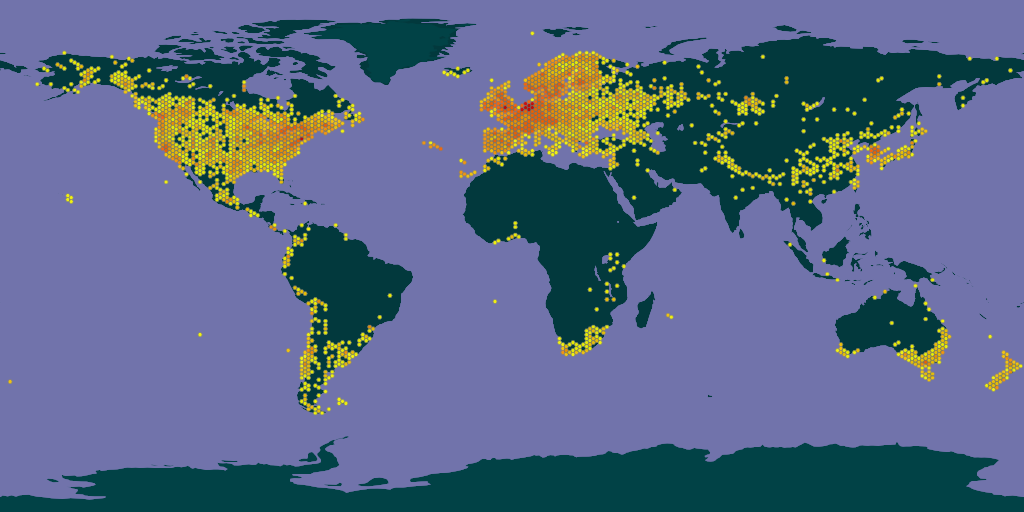
- Global distribution of Eristalis species observations produced from GBIF observations

Scientific classification
- Kingdom: Animalia
- Phylum: Arthropoda
- Clade: Pancrustacea
- Class: Insecta
- Order: Diptera
- Family: Syrphidae
- Subfamily: Eristalinae
- Tribe: Eristalini
- Subtribe: Eristalina
- Genus: Eristalis; Latreille, 1804

Type species
- Musca tenax Linnaeus, 1758

Subgenera
- Eoseristalis Kanervo, 1938; Eristalis Latreille, 1804

Synonyms
- Elophilus Meigen, 1803, Eristaloides Rondani, 1845; Eristalomya Rondani, 1857; Eristalomyia Verrall, 1882; Helophilus Leach, 1817; Tubifera Meigen, 1800

= Eristalis =

Genus of flies

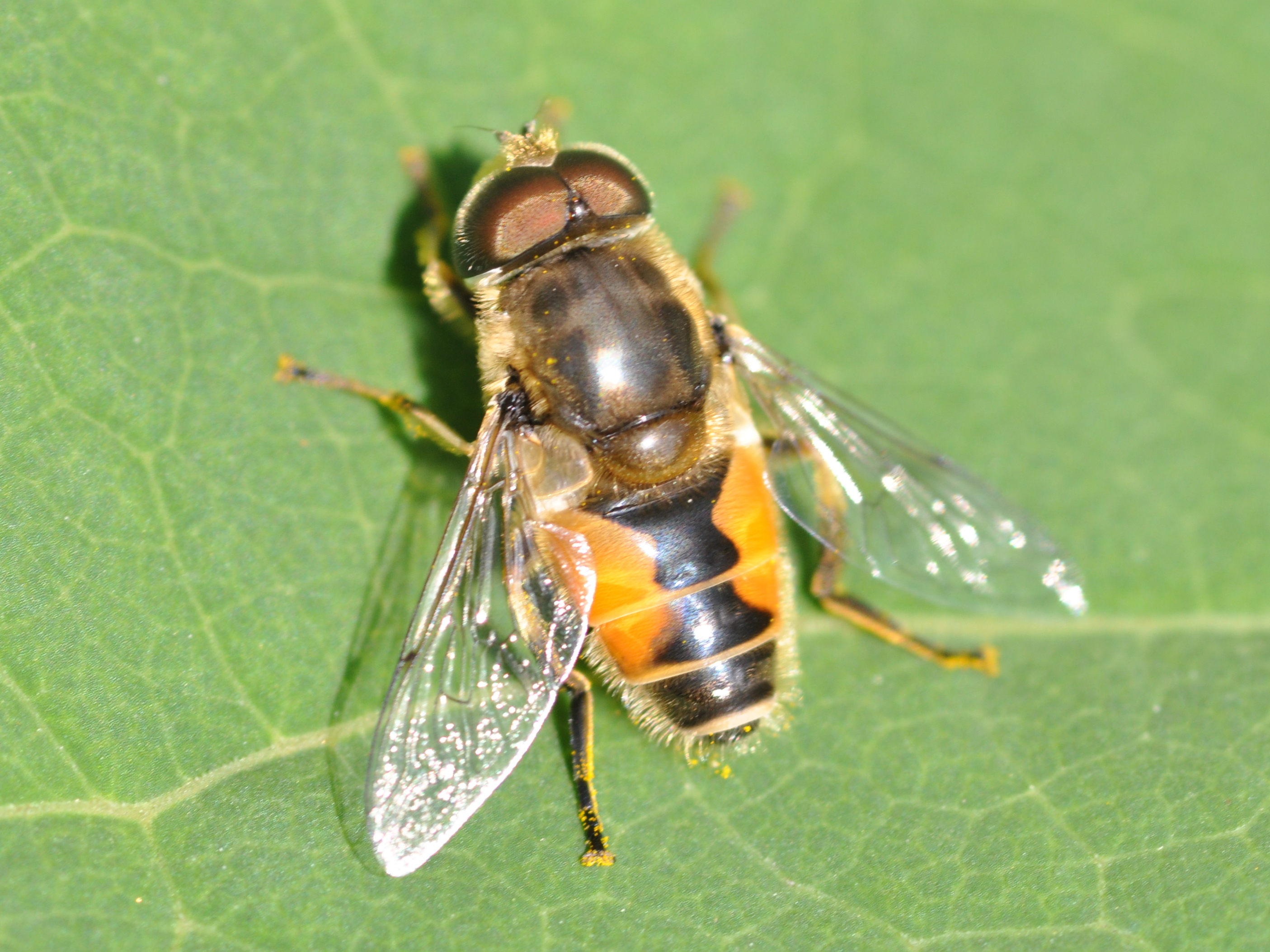
European drone fly (Eristalis arbustorum) on a leaf

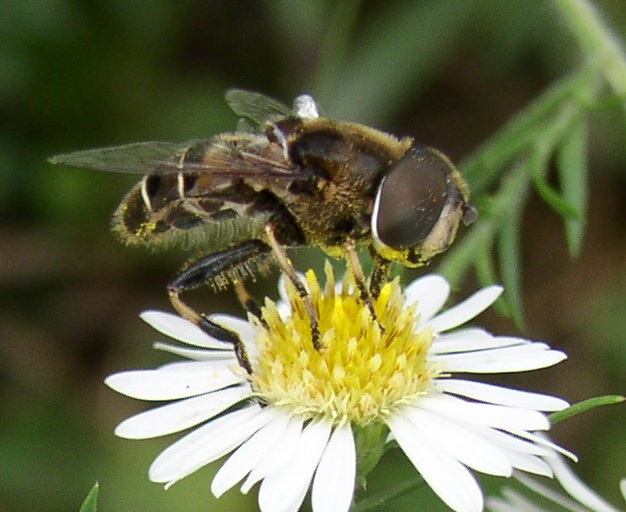
Black-shouldered drone fly (Eristalis dimidiata) female

Eristalis is a large genus of hoverflies, family Syrphidae, in the order Diptera. Several species are known as drone flies (or droneflies) because they bear a resemblance to honeybee drones.

Drone flies and their relatives are fairly common generalist pollinators, the larvae of which are aquatic, and breathe through a long, snorkel-like appendage, hence the common name rat-tailed maggots.

Eristalis is a large genus of around 99 species, and is subdivided into several subgenera and species groups (Eristalomyia, Eristalis, Eoseristalis etc.).

== Scientific name and grammatical gender ==
The scientific name was proposed by Pierre André Latreille in 1804. He placed seven species in his new genus, but listed the names as combinations with Syrphus, so it remained unclear what gender he attributed to the name (the gender of the name Syrphus is masculine). In the two centuries following its publication, Eristalis was sometimes considered to be of feminine gender, sometimes to be of masculine gender. George Henry Verrall (1901) assigned its gender as masculine, a choice followed in British literature, and also in Dutch, Polish, Czech, Spanish and Portuguese literature. In several other European languages and in North America, the tradition was to consider it as a feminine word. In 1993 the International Commission on Zoological Nomenclature placed the name on the Official List, and gave its gender as masculine, without justification for that choice. In 2004, Peter Chandler, Andrew Wakeham-Dawson and Angus McCullough submitted an application to confirm the gender of Eristalis as feminine. They referred to ICZN Art. 30.1.1, which states that a name in Latin form takes the gender given for that word in standard Latin dictionaries. In Composition of Scientific Words by R.W. Brown (1954), "eristalis" is listed as a feminine word that refers to an unknown precious stone. The request of Chandler et al. was granted less than two years after submission. As of 2006, Eristalis is officially a word of feminine gender.

== Identification ==
For terms see Morphology of Diptera.

As a true fly, the species of the genus Eristalis have a single pair of wings and a pair of halteres. As a member of the family Syrphidae, Eristalis have a spurious vein in the wing. Defined by Latreille in 1804, Eristalis was restricted by Meigen in 1882 to those species with a sinuate vein R4+5 and petiolate cell r1.

Since the origin of the genus Eristalis, many genera have been added that refine the description of Latreille such as Eristalinus, Meromarcrus, Palpada, Helophilus etc. The subtribe Eristalina has been established to contain these genera. Now it is generally accepted as those which have vein R2+3 sinuate, cell r1 usually petiolate and metafemur with basolateral setose patch. With the addition of the following criteria: anepimeron with triangular portion bare, katepimeron pilose, meron bare posteroventrally, without pile anterior or ventral to metathoracic spiracle, eye pilose.

== Larvae ==
The larvae of Eristalini are aquatic and of the long-tailed type. Those of Eristalis are very commonly found breeding in putrid or stagnant water or in moist excrement, and are called "rat-tailed maggots" or "mousies".

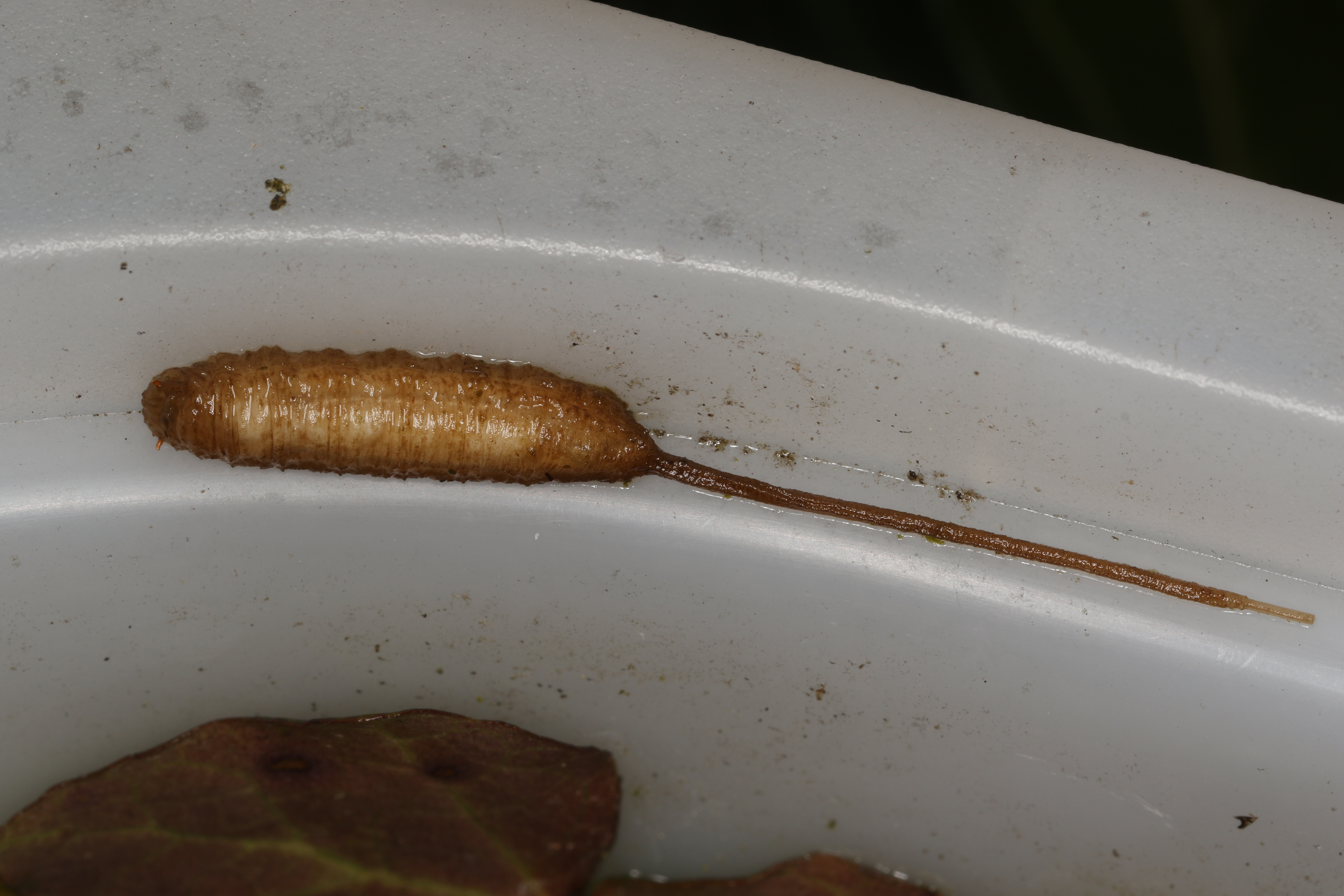
Larva of an Eristalis species, showing the 'rat tail'.

The "tail" is actually an extendable breathing tube often used to extend above the waterline. This tube allows the larvae to live in oxygen-depleted water such as sewage and stagnant pools where most other larvae cannot exist. Rat tailed larvae also exploit wet mud, manure and moist rotting vegetation. Many species of Eristalis remain unknown. Working in areas where larvae are likely to be found (e.g. manure pits, sewage seepage and stagnant pools) is difficult and rearing the larvae to adults is even more so. Basic information on many species of Eristalis remain to be discovered.

== Pollination ==
A female common drone fly on Zinnia. A portion shown in close-up played at one-tenth place.

Adults of Eristalis species such as the common drone fly (E. tenax) and the orange-legged drone fly (E. flavipes) are pollen and nectar feeders with hairy bodies capable of picking up and transferring pollen, and may act as keystone pollinators in some systems. Pollinating Eristalis species are often generalists, and are known to act as pollinators for common crops such as Brassica rapa, common onion (Allium cepa), sweet pepper (Capsicum annuum), kiwifruit (Actinidia deliciosa), and apples (Malus domestica). Eristalis are tetrachromats, with strong colour differentiation and preferences towards yellow flower colours, compared to trichromatic bees which often prefer blue hues. On islands where bees are absent, their colour preferences may induce selection for higher proportions of yellow in flowers, and they can be seen as frequent and effective pollinators for plants like moon tree foil (Medicago citrina). The mobility of hoverflies may aid in long-distance pollen transfer, facilitating gene flow between unconnected plant populations.

Some species, particularly E. tenax, have been suggested as candidates for a managed pollination alternative to European honey bees (Apis mellifera) due to their similar pollination efficacies, abundance, wide distribution, flight range, behavioural plasticity, and high reproductive success. Multiple generations may be reared per year, and Eristalis are readily reared in laboratory conditions. However, there are challenges concerning commercial mass rearing, retaining numbers, and impacts on non-target species. Due to their ability to fly long distances, dispersal of captive-reared populations may pose a risk to nearby farm equipment and machinery. Eristalis may also act as mechanical vectors for parasites affecting bees, such as Crithidia bombi.

== Interactions with humans ==
The larvae of Eristalis species may be considered pests where they affect livestock, contaminating feed and affecting electrical supplies due their mass congregations seeking dry sites for pupation. Some species of Eristalis have been known as a rare cause of myiasis, with larvae capable of surviving gastric fluids upon ingestion. Symptoms of myiasis from Eristalis species include diffuse abdominal pain and diarrhoea. Treatment may include anthelmintics such as ivermectin.

== Species ==
- Eristalis abusiva Collin, 1931
- Eristalis agrorum (Wiedemann, 1830)
- Eristalis alleni Thompson, 1997 – Paul Allen's flower fly
- Eristalis alpina (Panzer, 1798)
- Eristalis anthophorina (Fallén, 1817) – orange-spotted drone fly
- Eristalis arbustorum (Linnaeus, 1758) – European drone fly
- Eristalis azorensis Bot, Hofstee & Mengual, 2025
- Eristalis barda (Say, 1829)
- Eristalis basilaris Macquart, 1834
- Eristalis bellardii Jaennicke, 1867 – Mexican mountain drone fly
- Eristalis bogotensis Macquart, 1842
- Eristalis brousii Williston, 1882 – hourglass drone fly
- Eristalis calida Walker, 1849
- Eristalis cerealis Fabricius, 1805
- Eristalis circe Williston, 1891
- Eristalis corymbus Violovitsh, 1975
- Eristalis croceimaculata Jacobs, 1900
- Eristalis cryptarum (Fabricius, 1794) – bog-dwelling drone fly
- Eristalis deserta Violovitsh, 1977
- Eristalis dimidiata (Wiedemann, 1830) – black-shouldered drone fly
- Eristalis dubia Macquart, 1834
- Eristalis fenestrata de Meijere, 1908
- Eristalis flavipes Walker, 1849 – orange-legged drone fly
- Eristalis fraterculus (Zetterstedt, 1838) – black-spotted drone fly
- Eristalis gatesi Thompson, 1997 – Bill Gates' flower fly
- Eristalis gomonojunovae Violovitsh, 1977 – Arctic drone fly
- Eristalis hirta Loew, 1866 – black-footed drone fly
- Eristalis horticola (De Geer, 1776)
- Eristalis intricaria (Linnaeus, 1758)
- Eristalis japonica van der Goot, 1964
- Eristalis jugorum Egger, 1858
- Eristalis kamtshatica Violovitsh, 1977
- Eristalis katoi Shiraki, 1968
- Eristalis kyokoae Kimura, 1986
- Eristalis latifrons Zetterstedt, 1843
- Eristalis lunata de Meijere, 1908, 1776
- Eristalis marfax Curran, 1947
- Eristalis nemorum (Linnaeus, 1758) – orange-spined drone fly
- Eristalis obscura (Loew, 1866) – dusty drone fly
- Eristalis oestracea (Linnaeus, 1758) – orange-tailed drone fly
- Eristalis pacifica Violovitsh, 1977
- Eristalis parens Bigot, 1880
- Eristalis pertinax (Scopoli, 1763)
- Eristalis persa Williston, 1891
- Eristalis picea (Fallén, 1817)
- Eristalis precipua Williston, 1888
- Eristalis pseudorupium Kanervo, 1938
- Eristalis rabida Violovitsh, 1977
- Eristalis reflugens Doleschall, 1858
- Eristalis rossica Stackelberg 1958
- Eristalis rupium Fabricius, 1805 – spot-winged drone fly
- Eristalis saphirina Bigot, 1880
- Eristalis saxorum Wiedemann, 1830 – blue-polished drone fly
- Eristalis semicirculus Walker, 1852
- Eristalis similis (Fallén, 1817)
- Eristalis stipator Osten Sacken, 1877 – yellow-shouldered drone fly
- Eristalis tammensis Bagatshanova, 1980
- Eristalis tenax (Linnaeus, 1758) – common drone fly
- Eristalis tibetica Violovitsh, 1976
- Eristalis transversa (Wiedemann, 1830) – transverse-banded drone fly
- Eristalis tricolor Bigot, 1880
- Eristalis tundrarum Frey, 1932
- Eristalis vallei (Kanervo, 1934)
- Eristalis vitripennis (Strobl, 1893)

== Gallery ==
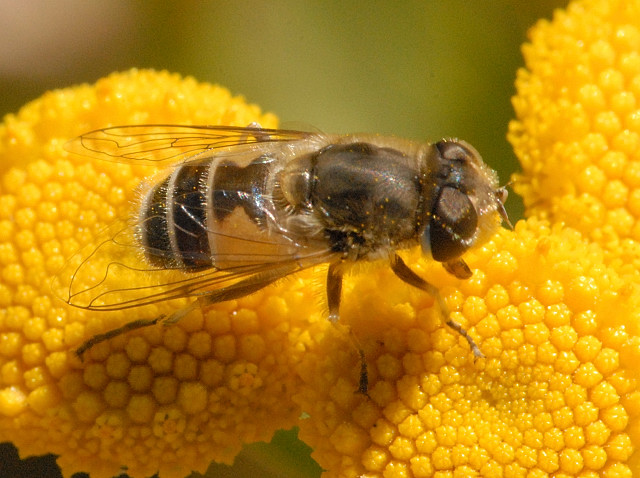
Eristalis abusiva female

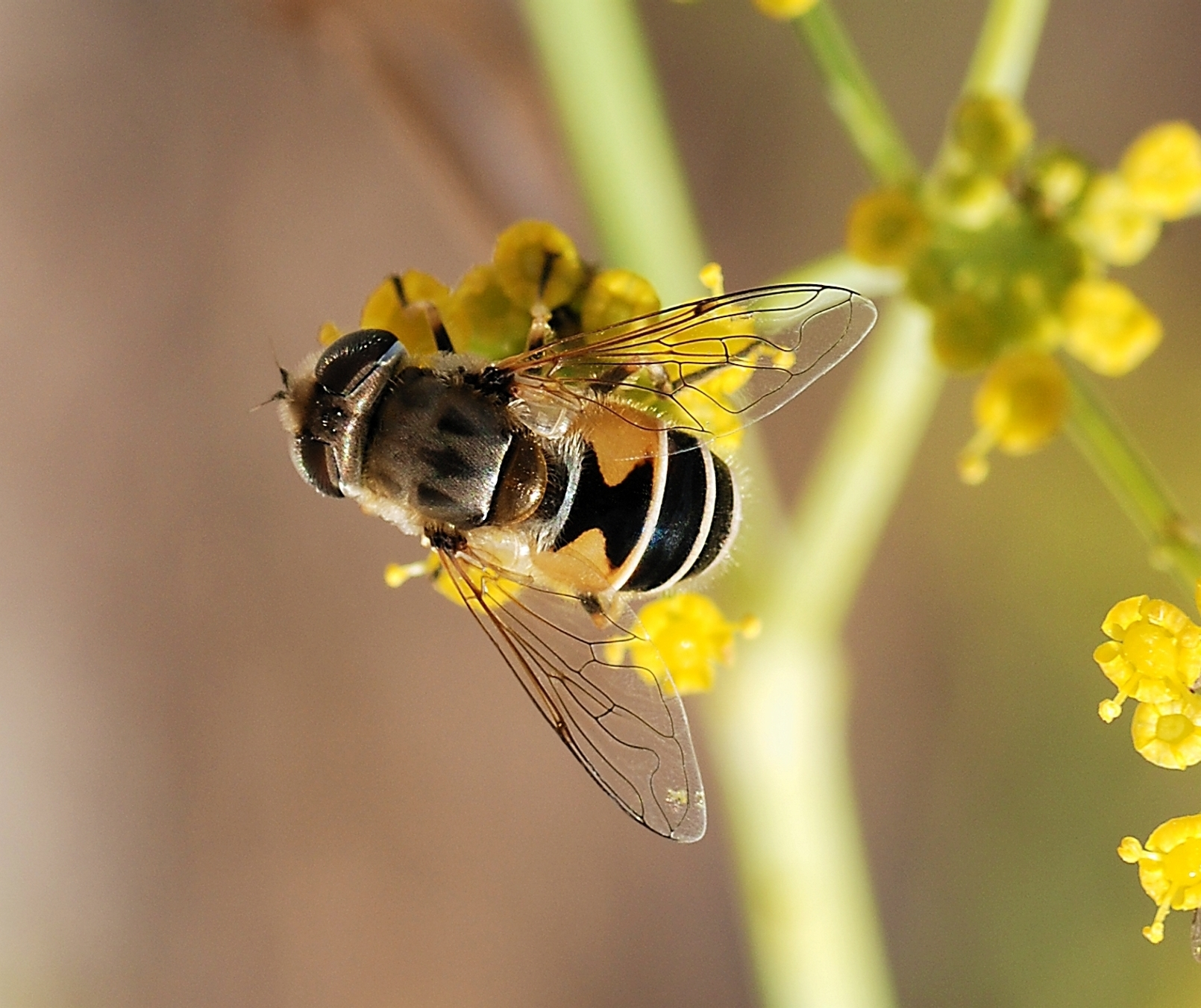
Eristalis arbustorum female

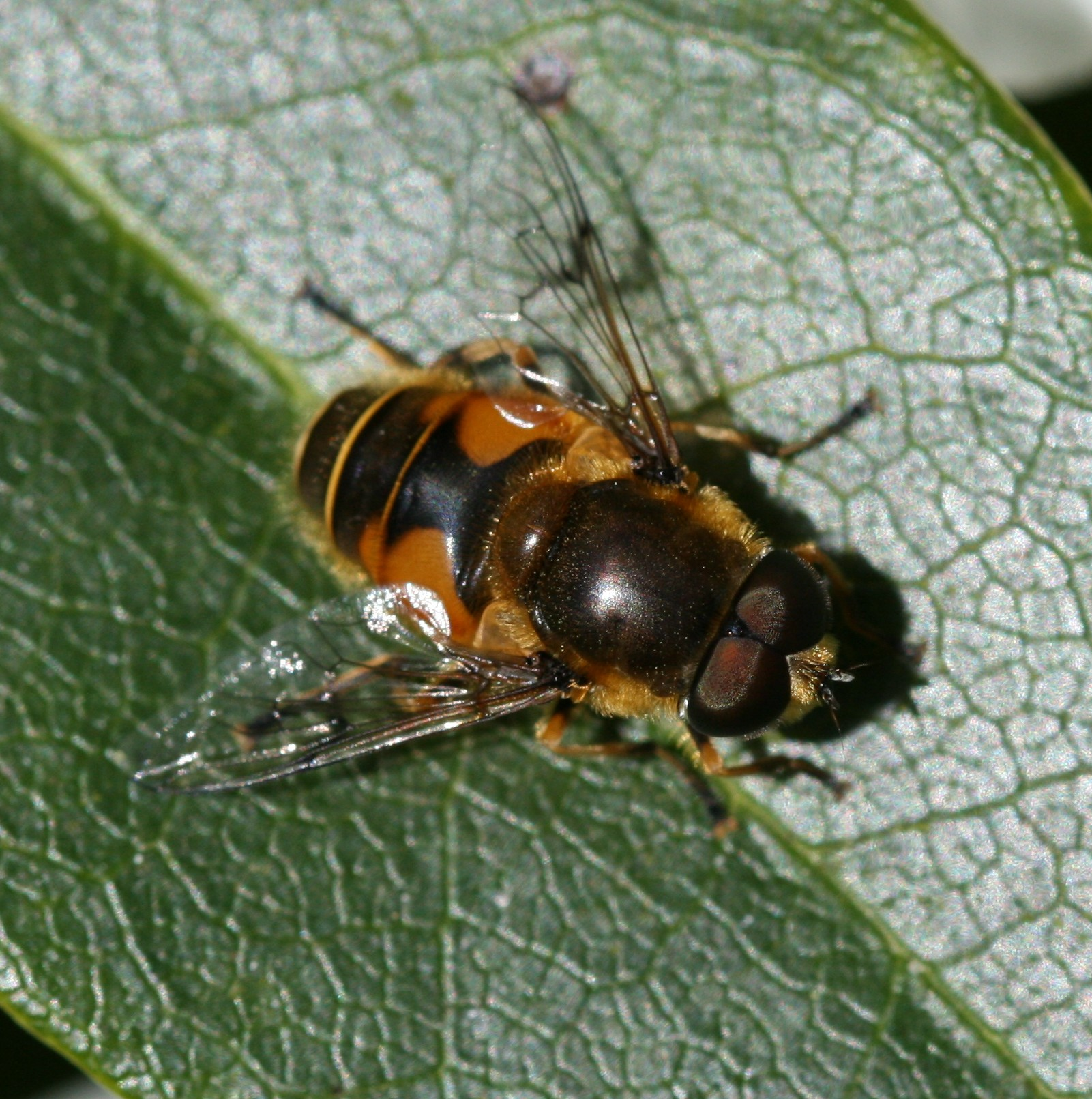
Eristalis horticola male

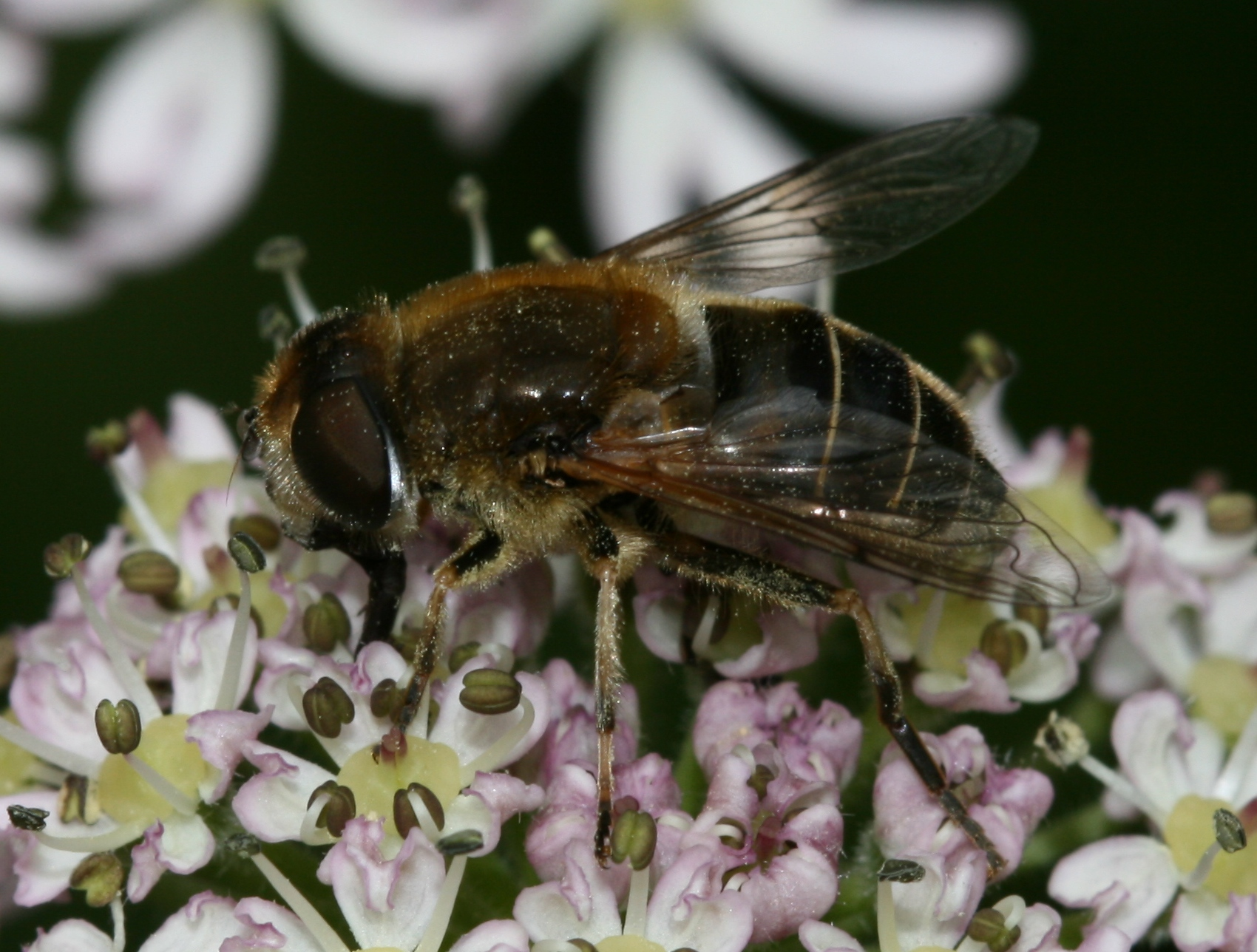
Eristalis nemorum female

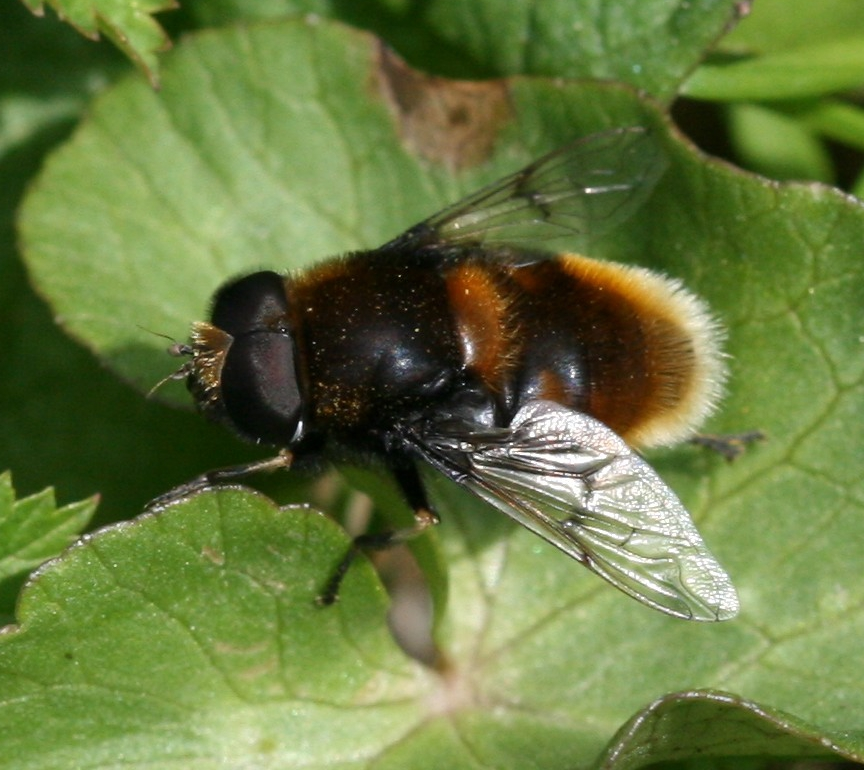
Eristalis intricaria male

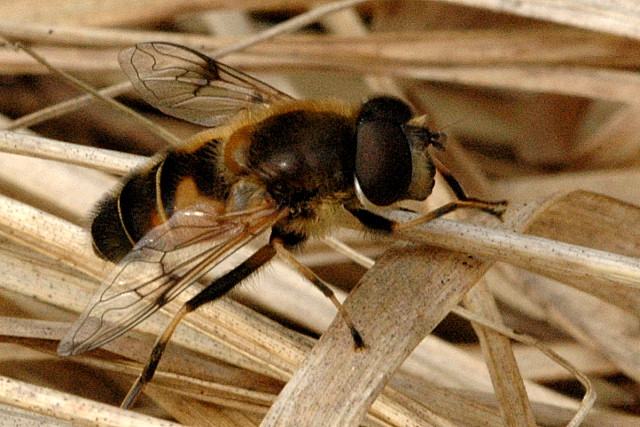
Eristalis picea male

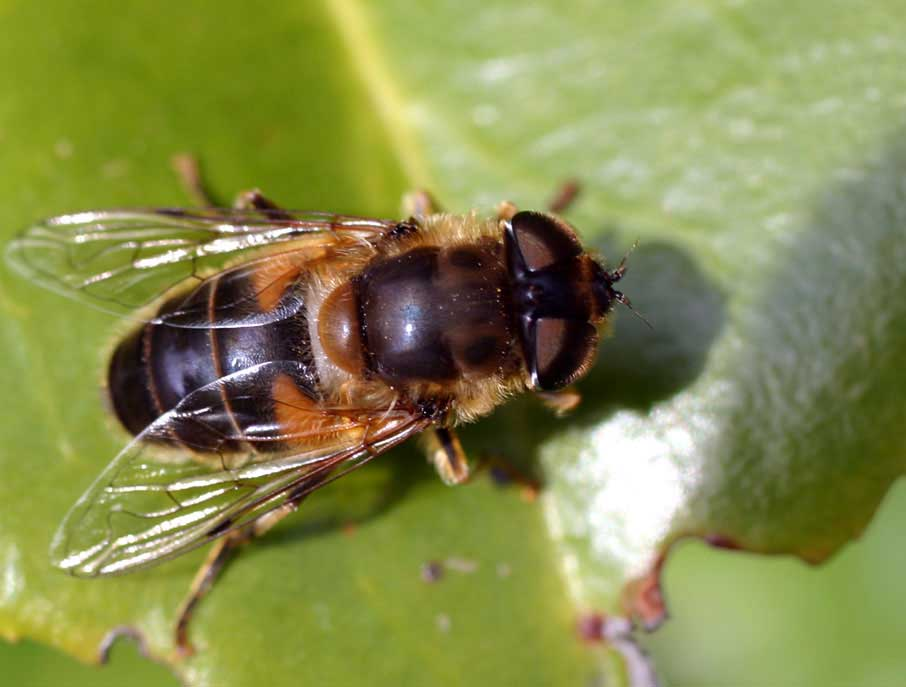
Eristalis pertinax female

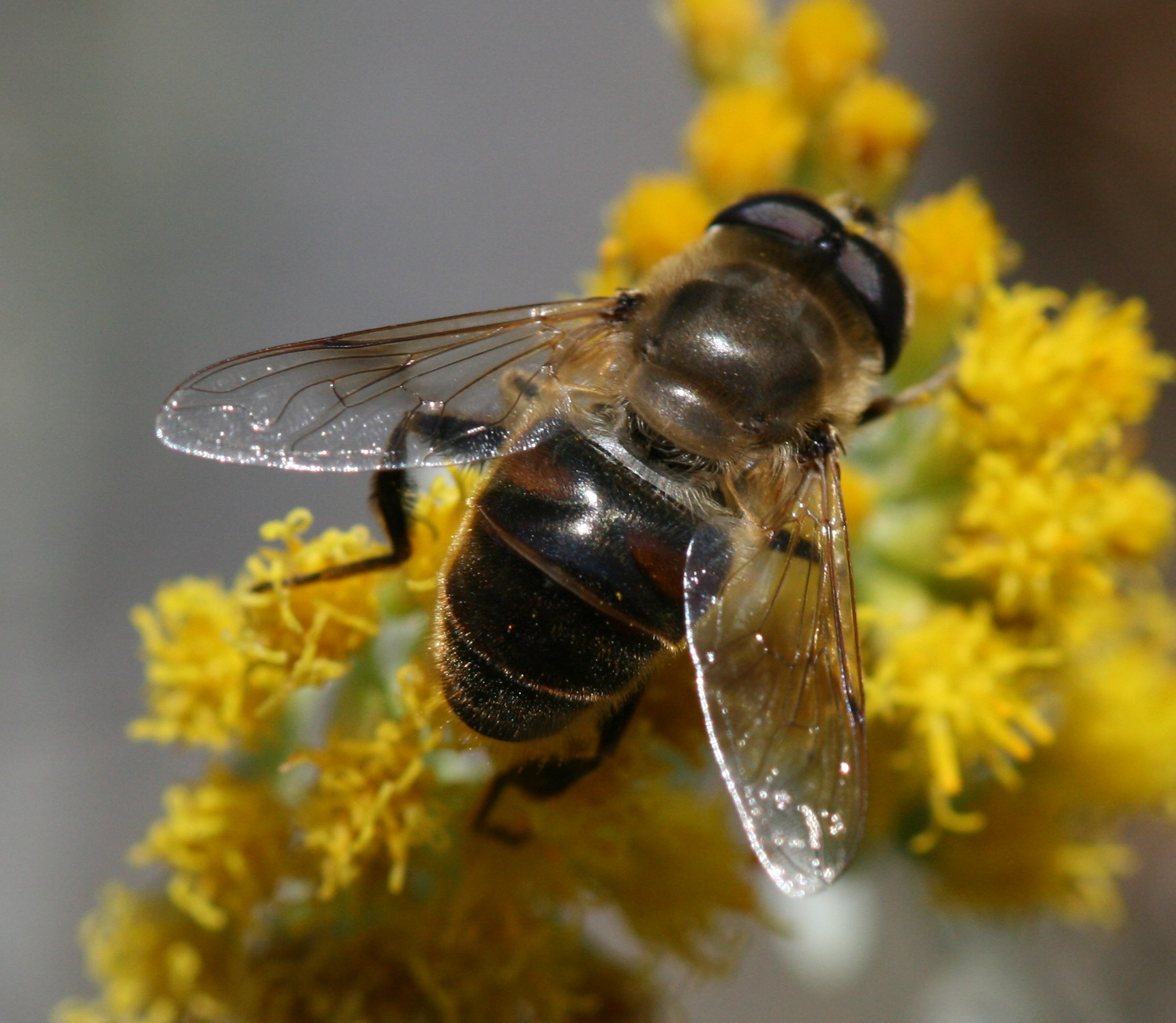
Eristalis tenax male

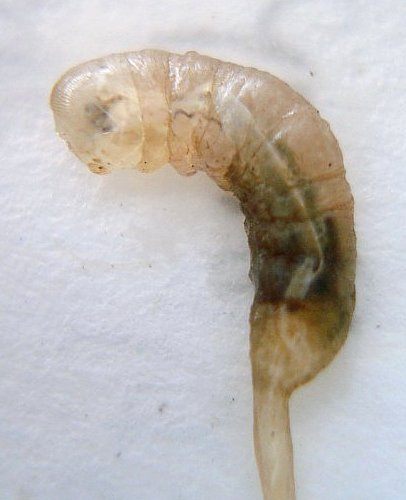
Eristalis tenax larva
