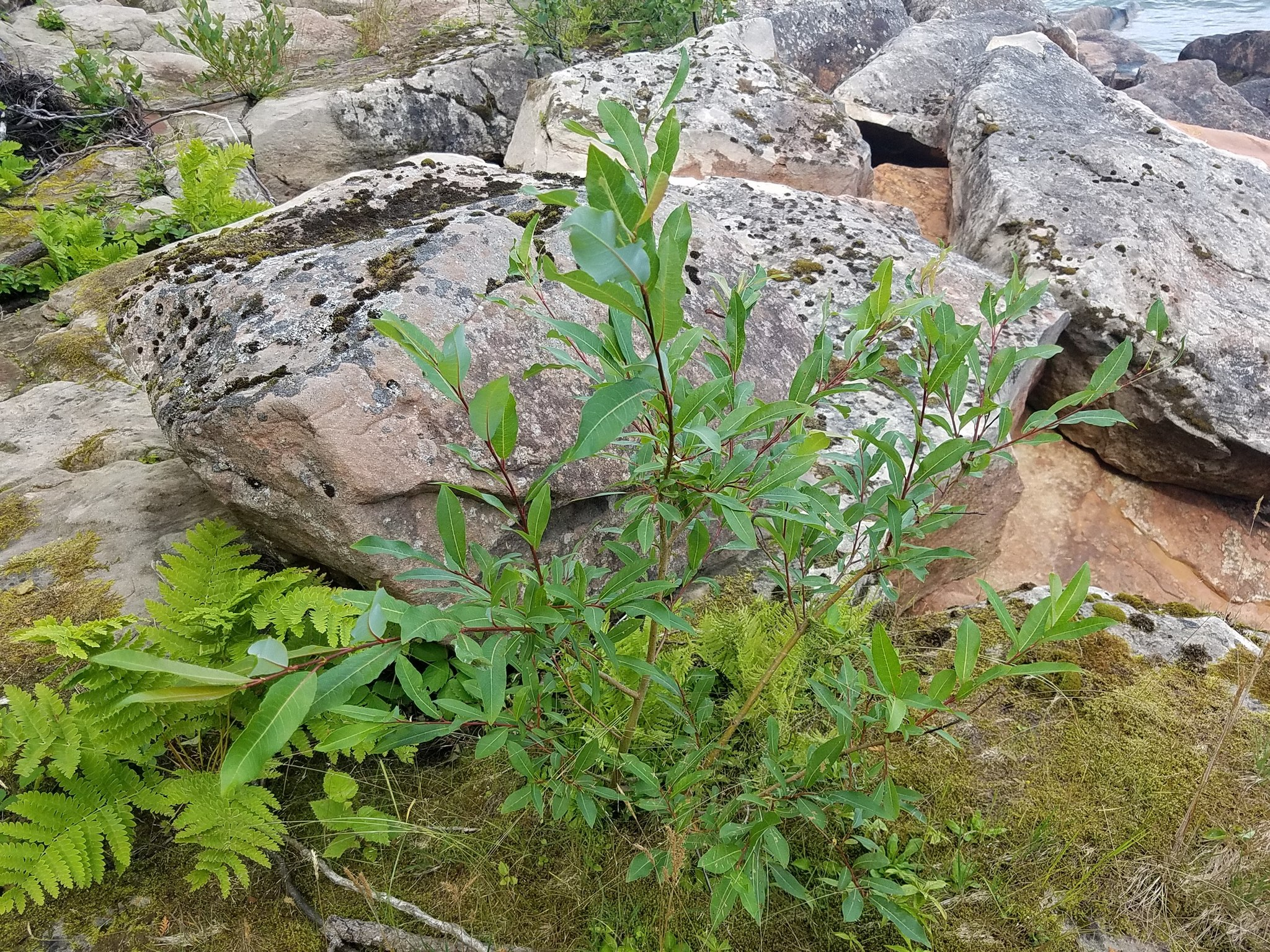

Conservation status
- Least Concern (IUCN 3.1)

Scientific classification
- Kingdom: Plantae
- Clade: Embryophytes
- Clade: Tracheophytes
- Clade: Spermatophytes
- Clade: Angiosperms
- Clade: Eudicots
- Clade: Rosids
- Order: Malpighiales
- Family: Salicaceae
- Genus: Salix
- Species: S. myricoides

Binomial name
- Salix myricoides Muhl.

Synonyms
- List: Salix cordata var. glaucophylla Bebb; Salix cordata var. myricoides (Muhl.) J.Carey; Salix glaucophylla var. albovestita C.R.Ball; Salix glaucophylla var. angustifolia Bebb ex C.F.Wheeler & E.F.Sm.; Salix glaucophylla var. brevifolia Bebb ex C.F.Wheeler & E.F.Sm.; Salix glaucophylla var. integra Zabel; Salix glaucophylla var. latifolia Bebb ex C.F.Wheeler & E.F.Sm.; Salix glaucophylla var. latifolia Zabel; Salix glaucophylloides f. lasioclada Fernald; Salix glaucophylloides Fernald; Salix glaucophylloides var. albovestita (C.R.Ball) Fernald; Salix glaucophylloides var. brevifolia (Bebb ex C.F.Wheeler & E.F.Sm.) C.R.Ball ex E.G.Voss; Salix glaucophylloides var. glaucophylla C.K.Schneid.; Salix myricoides var. albovestita (C.R.Ball) Dorn; Salix myricoides var. angustifolia (Bebb ex C.F.Wheeler & E.F.Sm.) G.Wilh. & Rericha; Salix × laurentiana f. glaucophylla (Bebb) B.Boivin; Vimen myricoides (Muhl.) Raf.

= Salix myricoides =

Species of flowering plant

Salix myricoides, the bayberry willow or blue-leaf willow, is a species of flowering plant in the family Salicaceae, native to the Great Lakes region of the Midwestern United States, and to eastern Canada. It is typically found on beaches and dunes of the Lakes, and occasionally along inland streams and in fens, if calcareous. For example, in Maine it is found only on the ice-scoured shore of the St. John River.
