= Sanguinary =

Sanguinary may refer to:

- an action accompanied by bloodshed or bloody violence
- the common yarrow (Achillea millefolium), a flowering plant
