= Williams Brothers (disambiguation) =

The Williams Brothers were an American singing quartet, including Andy Williams.

Williams Brothers may also refer to:

- The Williams Brothers (gospel group)
- Williams Bros Brewing Co, Alloa, Clackmannanshire, Scotland
- Williams Companies, an American energy company originally called Williams Brothers

== See also ==
- Williams sisters, professional American tennis players
