= Gruit =

Herb mixture used for bittering and flavouring beer

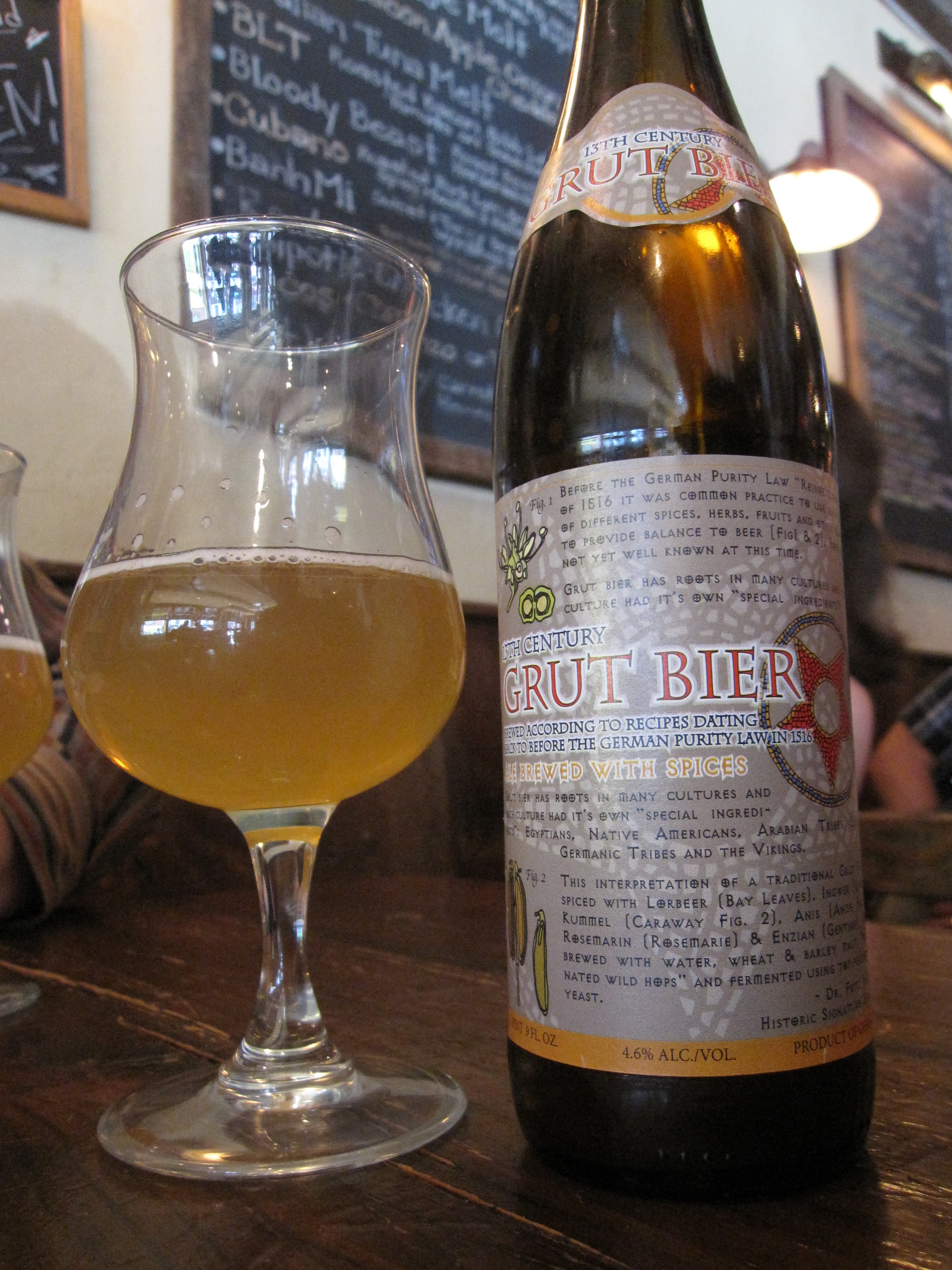
Beer brewed following a 13th-century recipe using gruit herbs

Gruit (pronounced /ˈɡrut/; alternatively grut or gruyt) is a herb mixture used for bittering and flavouring beer, popular before the extensive use of hops. The terms gruit and grut ale may also refer to the beverage produced using gruit. Today, however, gruit is a colloquial term applied to a beer produced with hops that is seasoned with gruit-like herbs.

== Historical context ==
The word gruit stems from an area now in the Netherlands, Belgium, and northwestern Germany. The word refers to the herb mixture originally used to enhance the flavour of beers before the general use of hops. The earliest reference to gruit dates from the late 10th century. During the 11th century, the Holy Roman Emperor Henry IV awarded monopoly privileges of the production and sale of gruit (Grutgerechtigkeit 'grut licence') to different local authorities, and as such imposed a de facto tax on beer. (Note: It is believed that Henry IV awarded the German clergymen the exclusive right to produce and tax gruit in order to gain the clergy's support throughout the Holy Roman Empire.) The control of gruit restricted entry to local beer markets – brewers in a diocese were not allowed to sell beer brewed without the local gruit, and imports were similarly restricted. The gruit licensing system also exerted control over brewers within a city, as the holder of a Grutgerechtigkeit could calculate how much beer each brewer could make based on how much gruit was sold to them. Outside the area where the gruit monopoly applied, other countries and regions produced ales containing spices, but they were not called gruit. For instance, some traditional types of unhopped beer such as sahti in Finland, which is spiced with juniper sprigs, have survived the advent of hops.

Specific gruit recipes were often guarded secrets. In 1420, the town council of Cologne "directed a knowledgeable woman to teach a certain brewer, and no one else, how to make [gruit]". Although largely replaced by hops in the 14th and 15th centuries, gruit-flavoured beer was locally produced in Westphalia until at least the 17th century.

In both the area where gruit existed and outside it, the traditional spices were progressively substituted by hops, in a slow transition across Europe occurring between the 11th century (in the South and East of the Holy Roman Empire) and late 16th century (Great Britain). In 16th-century Britain, a distinction was made between "ale" (which was unhopped), and the "beer" brought in by Dutch merchants, which was hopped. In more recent centuries, however, the words beer and ale have been synonymous, as is still largely the case in British English, although recently there has been an increase in the use (originating in the United States) where ale means beer other than lager beer.

The main factor for the replacement of spices by hops is that hops were cheaper (especially in the gruit area, where the price of beer flavouring spices was artificially kept high) and were better at rendering the beer more stable. This preservative effect is thought to have had a large impact on the early movement to switch over, although other plants commonly used in gruit mixes, for example sage, rosemary, or bog myrtle, also have antiseptic properties likely to extend the shelf life of beer. Spruce tips as a local food ingredient have a practical aspect as well; it is a plentiful resource in northern latitudes such as Finland and Alaska, while in Alaska hops must be imported from the lower 48 United States.

== Common ingredients ==
Historically, the main gruit additives seemed to be bog myrtle or marsh rosemary, plus laurel berries and laserwort = Siler montanum = Laserpitium siler (not Ferula drudeana or other Ferula species).

However, today gruit is a combination of herbs, commonly including:

- Common heather (Calluna vulgaris).
- Ground ivy (Glechoma hederacea)
- Horehound (Marrubium vulgare)
- Mugwort (Artemisia vulgaris)
- Sweet gale (Myrica gale)
- Yarrow (Achillea millefolium)

Gruit recipes varied somewhat; each gruit producer included different herbs to produce unique flavours and effects. Other adjunct herbs include marsh rosemary, laurel berries, laserwort, juniper berries, ginger, caraway seed, aniseed, nutmeg, cinnamon, mint, resin, and occasionally hops in variable proportions (although gruit today is often sought out specifically for its lack of hops).

== Modern brews ==
The 1990s microbrewery movement in North America and Europe renewed interest in unhopped beers, and several have tried reviving ales brewed with gruit, or plants that once were used in it. Commercial examples include:

Beer name	Gruit ingredients	Brewery	Country
Gruut Blond, Gruut Wit, Gruut Amber, Gruut Bruin, Gruut Inferno		Gentse Stadsbrouwerij Gruut	Ghent, Belgium
Fraoch	Heather flowers, sweet gale and ginger	Williams Brothers	Alloa, Scotland
Alba	Pine twigs and spruce buds	Williams Brothers	Alloa, Scotland
Gageleer	Sweet gale	Proefbrouwerij	Lochristi, Belgium
Cervoise	Heather flowers, spices, hops	Lancelot	Brittany, France
Artemis	Mugwort and wild bergamot (also known as bee balm)	Moonlight Brewing Company	Santa Rosa, California
Alaskan Winter Ale	Young Sitka spruce tips	Alaskan Brewing Company	Alaska, USA
Our Special Ale	Young Sitka spruce tips	Anchor Brewing Company	San Francisco, California
Spruce Tip Ale	Young Sitka spruce tips	Haines Brewing Company	Alaska
Spruce Tip Gruit	Young Sitka spruce tips	Wolf Tree Brewery	Seal Rock, Oregon
Island Trails Spruce Tip Wheat Wine	Young Sitka spruce tips	Kodiak Island Brewing Company	Alaska
Sitka Spruce Tip Ale	Young Sitka spruce tips	Baranof Island Brewing Company	Alaska
Bog Water	Myrica gale (bog myrtle)	Beau's All Natural Brewing Company	Vanleek Hill, Ontario, Canada
Spring Fever Gruit	Organic barley, heather, and spices	Salt Spring Island Brewery	British Columbia, Canada
Various Weekly Offerings	Locally foraged herbs, flowers, roots, and berries as well as classic gruit ingredients	Earth Eagle Brewings	Portsmouth, New Hampshire
Posca Rustica	Recipe based on archeological research at The Archeosite D'Aubechies – sweet woodruff (wild baby's breath) and bog myrtle among "a dozen" others	Brasserie Dupont	Wallonia, Belgium
Namastale	Juniper and rosemary	Church Key Brewing	Campbellford, Ontario, Canada
Dunes	Wormwood, mugwort, turmeric, lemongrass, and sage	Solarc Brewing	Los Angeles, California
Session Gruit	Chamomile and elderberries	Solarc Brewing	Los Angeles, California
Earl	Earl Grey tea, lemon verbena, and foraged rosemary	Solarc Brewing	Los Angeles, California
Wine Trash	Granache grape must and yarrow flower	Solarc Brewing	Los Angeles, California
Sun Eater	Rosemary and dried lemon peel	4th Tap Brewing Co-op	Austin, Texas
Jopen Koyt	Sweet gale and other herbs	Jopen	Haarlem, Netherlands
A River Runs Gruit	Lavender, chamomile, rose hips, and elderberry	Rock Art Brewery	Morrisville, Vermont
Spruce Stout	Spruce tips	Rock Art Brewery	Morrisville, Vermont
Zingiberene Ginger Gruit	Ginger	Schmohz Brewing Company	Grand Rapids, Michigan
Ancient Gruit Ale	Wormwood, grains of paradise, wild yarrow	The Beer Diviner	Cherry Plain, New York
Stop Trying to Make Gruit Happen	Barrel aged (6.5%)	Denizen's Brewing Company	Silver Spring, Maryland
Irish Gruit	Heather tips, rose hips (5.7%)	Dunagan Brewing Company	Gig Harbor, Washington
Gruit	Yarrow, sweet gale, and Labrador tea	Proper Brewing Company	Salt Lake City, Utah
Earthbound Gruit	Missouri cedar branches, heather tips, basswood honey	Dangerous Man Brewing Co.	Minneapolis, Minnesota
Nursia	Star anise, caraway, ginger, and spruce	Avery Brewing Co.	Boulder, Colorado
Special Herbs	Lemongrass, hyssop, Sichuan peppercorns, and orange peel	Upright Brewery	Portland, Oregon
groot	Clove, juniper berry, rainbow peppercorn, and caraway seed	Oliphant Brewing	Somerset, Wisconsin
Witchcraft Gruit Ale	Dandelion, ginger, coriander, lavender, orange peel	LyonSmith Brewing	Keuka Park, New York
Acqua Passata	Thyme, rhubarb, mugwort	Retorto	Podenzano, Piacenza, Italy
Cafe Amsterdam 10th Anniversary Gruit, 2009	Sage, thyme, cinnamon, peppercorn. orange peel	Midnight Sun Brewing Company	Anchorage, Alaska
Palisade	Oak bark, myrica gale	Jelling Bryghus ApS	Jelling, Denmark
The Witch (seasonal)	Rosemary, sage, blackcurrant	Torn Label Brewing Company	Kansas City, Missouri

Since 2013, craft brewers with an interest in making gruit-flavoured ales have banded together to mark 1 February as International Gruit Day. The day is intended to raise awareness of and pay homage to the historical traditions of brewing.

== See also ==
- Spruce beer, flavoured with spruce tree buds
- Witbier, or wheat beer
