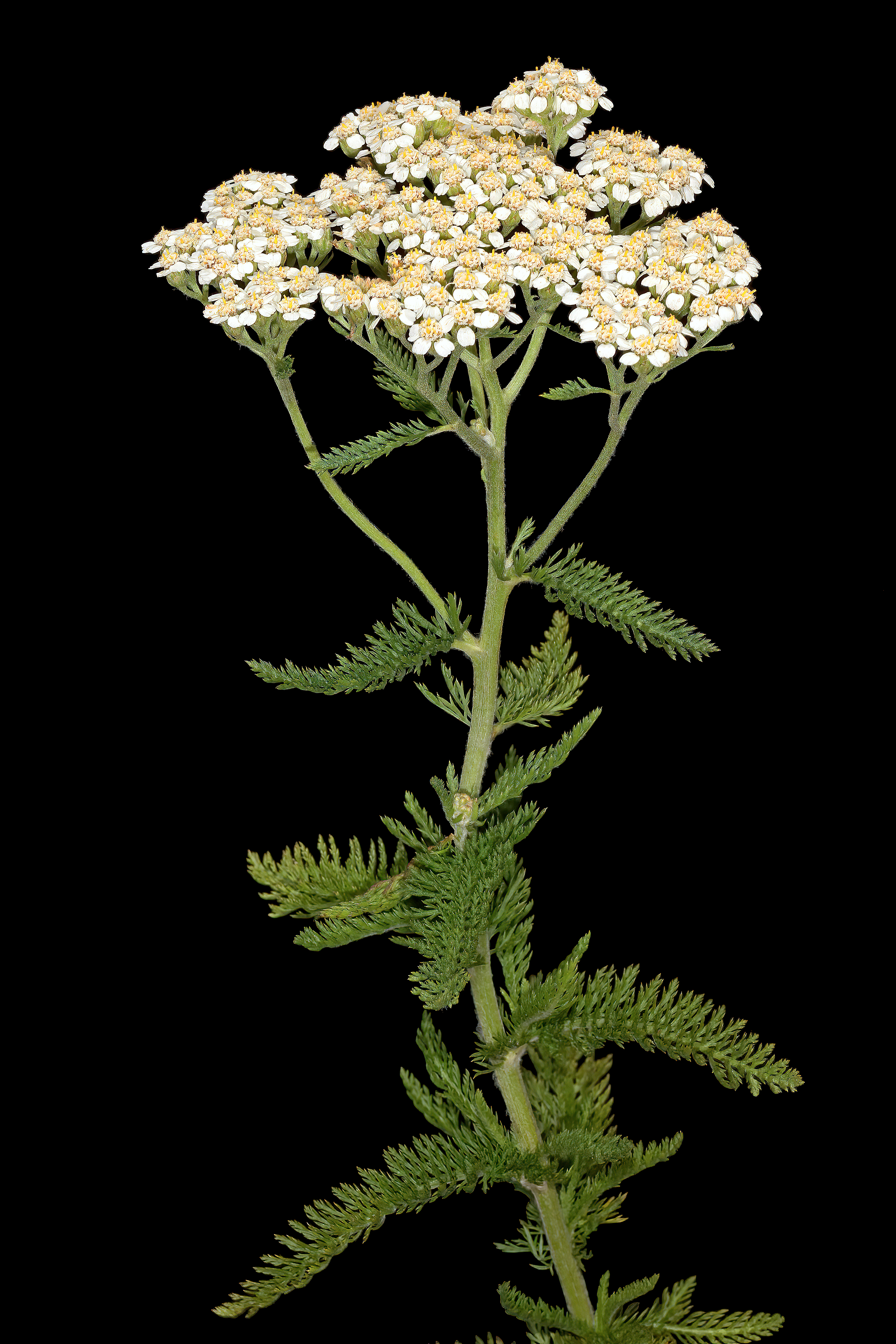

Conservation status
- Least Concern (IUCN 3.1)

- Secure (NatureServe)

Scientific classification
- Kingdom: Plantae
- Clade: Tracheophytes
- Clade: Angiosperms
- Clade: Eudicots
- Clade: Asterids
- Order: Asterales
- Family: Asteraceae
- Genus: Achillea
- Species: A. millefolium

Binomial name
- Achillea millefolium L.

Synonyms
- Synonymy: Achillea albida Willd.; Achillea alpicola (Rydb.) Rydb.; Achillea ambigua Boiss.; Achillea ambigua Pollini; Achillea anethifolia Fisch. ex Herder; Achillea angustissima Rydb.; Achillea arenicola A.Heller; Achillea bicolor Wender.; Achillea borealis Bong.; Achillea californica Pollard; Achillea ceretanica Sennen; Achillea compacta Lam.; Achillea coronopifolia Willd.; Achillea crassifolia Colla; Achillea cristata Hort. ex DC.; Achillea dentifera Rchb.; Achillea eradiata Piper; Achillea fusca Rydb.; Achillea gigantea Pollard; Achillea gracilis Raf.; Achillea haenkeana Tausch; Achillea intermedia Schleich.; Achillea lanata Lam.; Achillea lanulosa Nutt.; Achillea laxiflora A.Nelson; Achillea laxiflora Pollard & Cockerell; Achillea magna All.; Achillea magna L.; Achillea magna Haenke; Achillea marginata Turcz. ex Ledeb.; Achillea nabelekii Heimerl; Achillea occidentalis (DC.) Raf. ex Rydb.; Achillea ochroleuca Eichw.; Achillea ossica K.Koch; Achillea pacifica Rydb.; Achillea palmeri Rydb.; Achillea pecten-veneris Pollard; Achillea pratensis Saukel & R.Länger; Achillea pseudo-tanacetifolia Wierzb. ex Rchb.; Achillea puberula Rydb.; Achillea pumila Schur; Achillea rosea Desf.; Achillea setacea Schwein.; Achillea sordida (W.D.J.Koch) Dalla Torre & Sarnth.; Achillea subalpina Greene; Achillea submillefolium Klokov & Krytzka; Achillea sylvatica Becker; Achillea tanacetifolia Mill.; Achillea tenuifolia Salisb.; Achillea tenuis Schur; Achillea tomentosa Pursh 1813 not L. 1753; Achillea virgata Hort. ex DC.; Achillios millefoliatus St.-Lag.; Alitubus millefolium (L.) Dulac; Alitubus tomentosus Dulac; Chamaemelum millefolium (L.) E.H.L.Krause; Chamaemelum tanacetifolium (All.) E.H.L.Krause; Chamaemelum tomentosum (L.) E.H.L.Krause; plus many more names for subspecies, forms, and varieties

= Achillea millefolium =

Species of plant

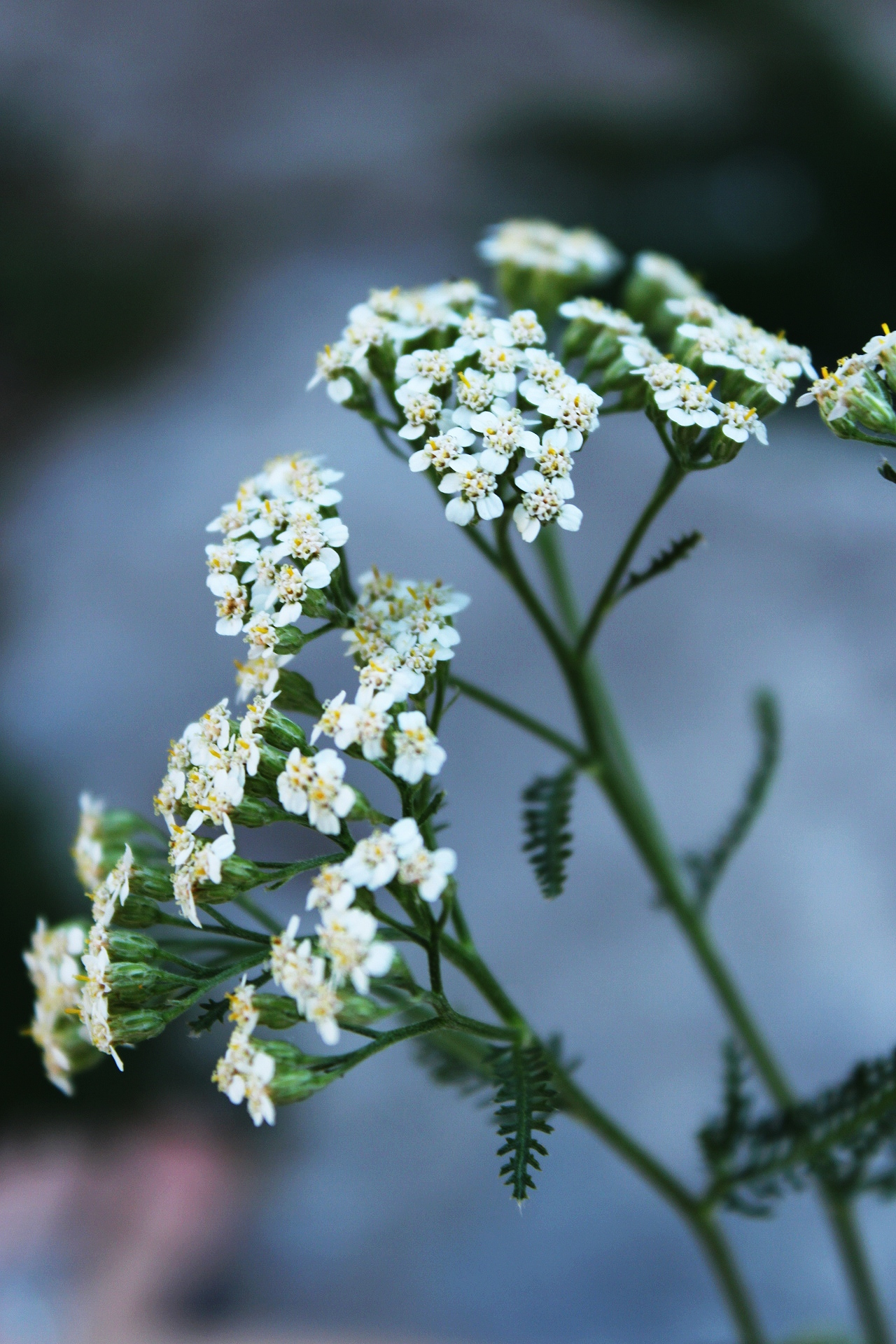
Achillea sp.

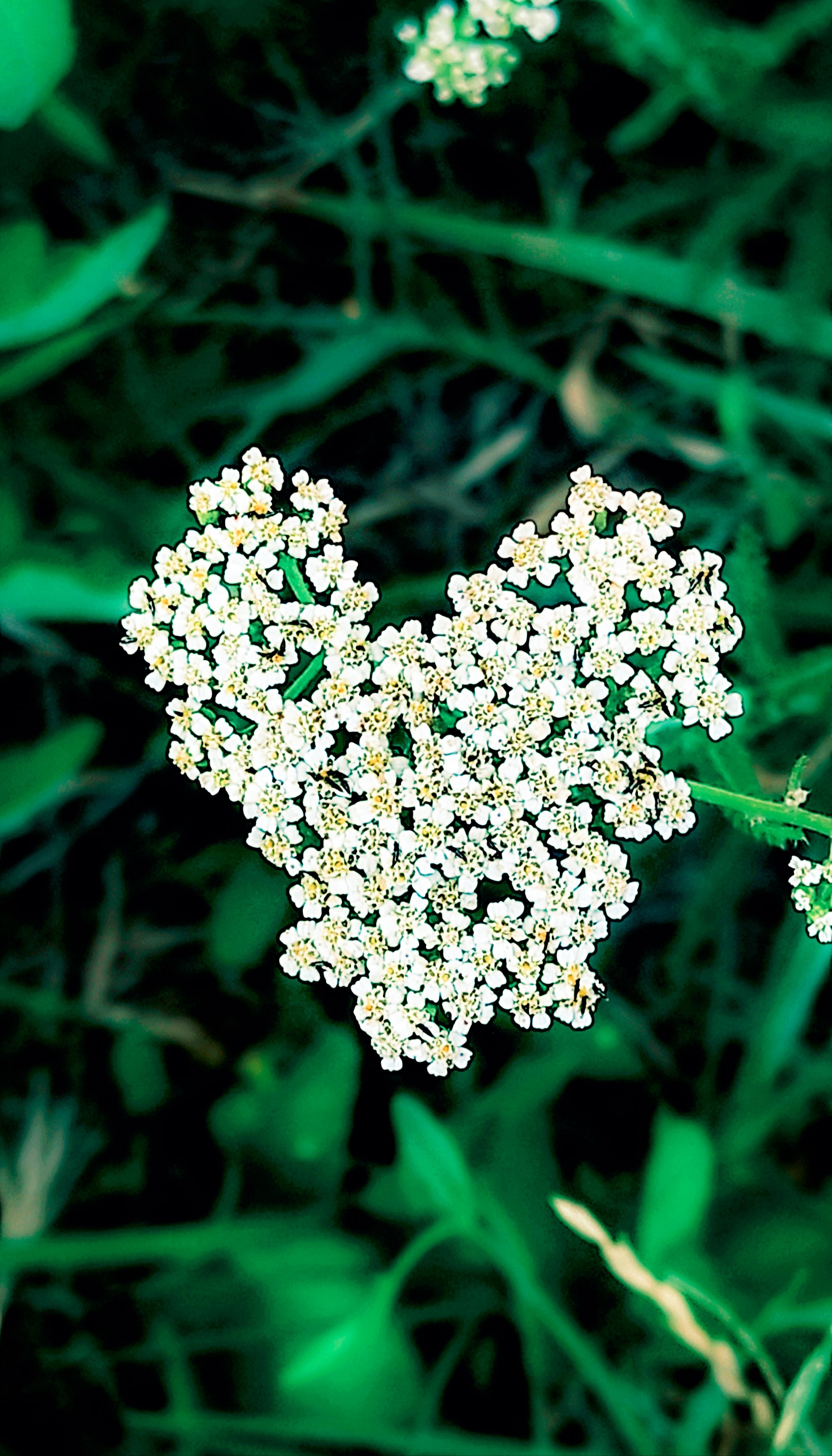
Achillea sp. in a heart shaped form

Achillea millefolium, commonly known as yarrow (/ˈjæroʊ/) or common yarrow, is a flowering plant in the family Asteraceae. Growing to 1 metre (3 1/3 feet) tall, it is characterized by small whitish flowers, a tall stem of fernlike leaves, and a pungent odor.

The plant is native to temperate regions of Eurasia and North America. It has been introduced as feed for livestock in New Zealand and Australia. It has some potential uses, including in traditional medicine.

== Description ==
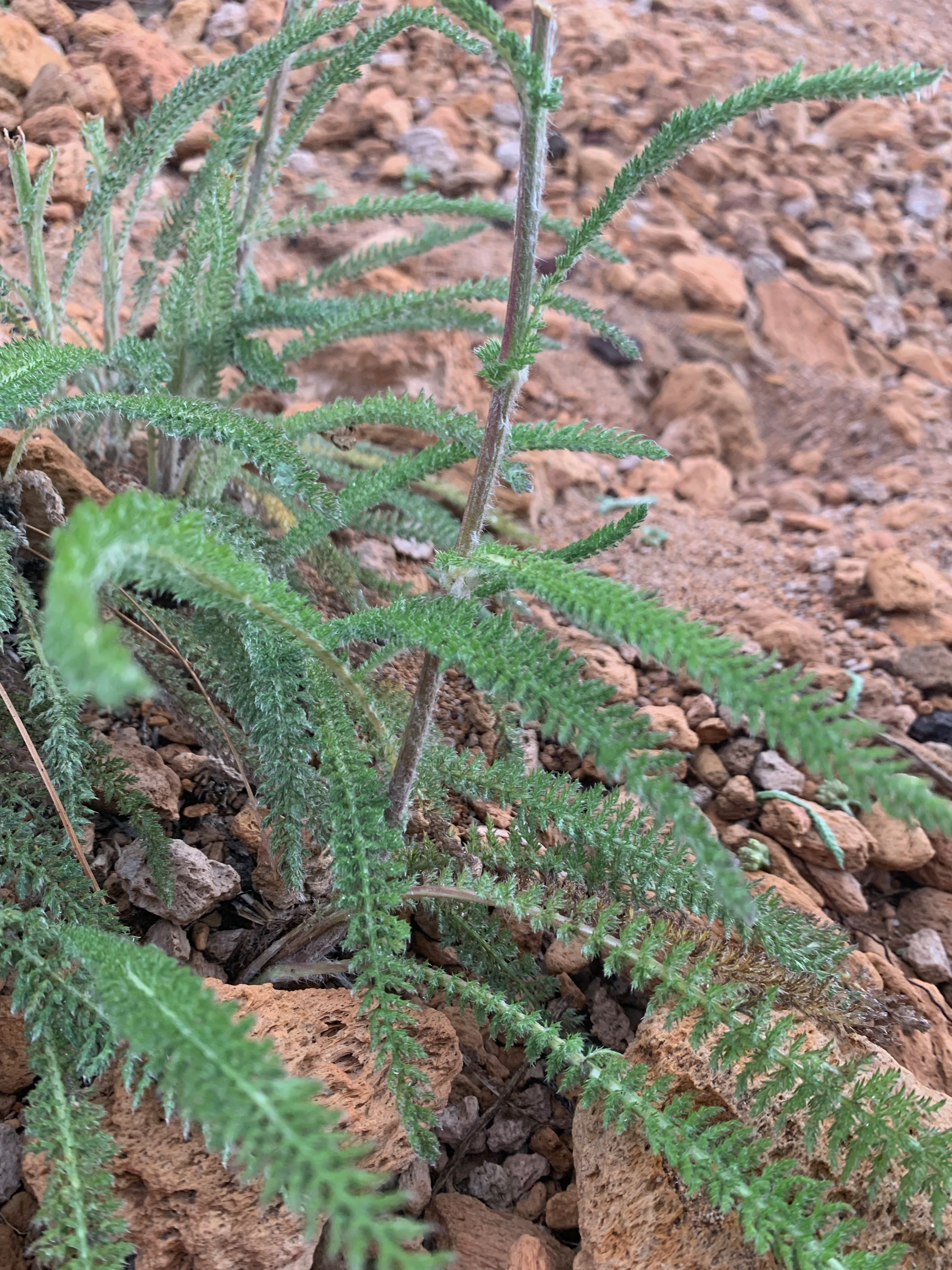
Petiolate leaves on lower stems

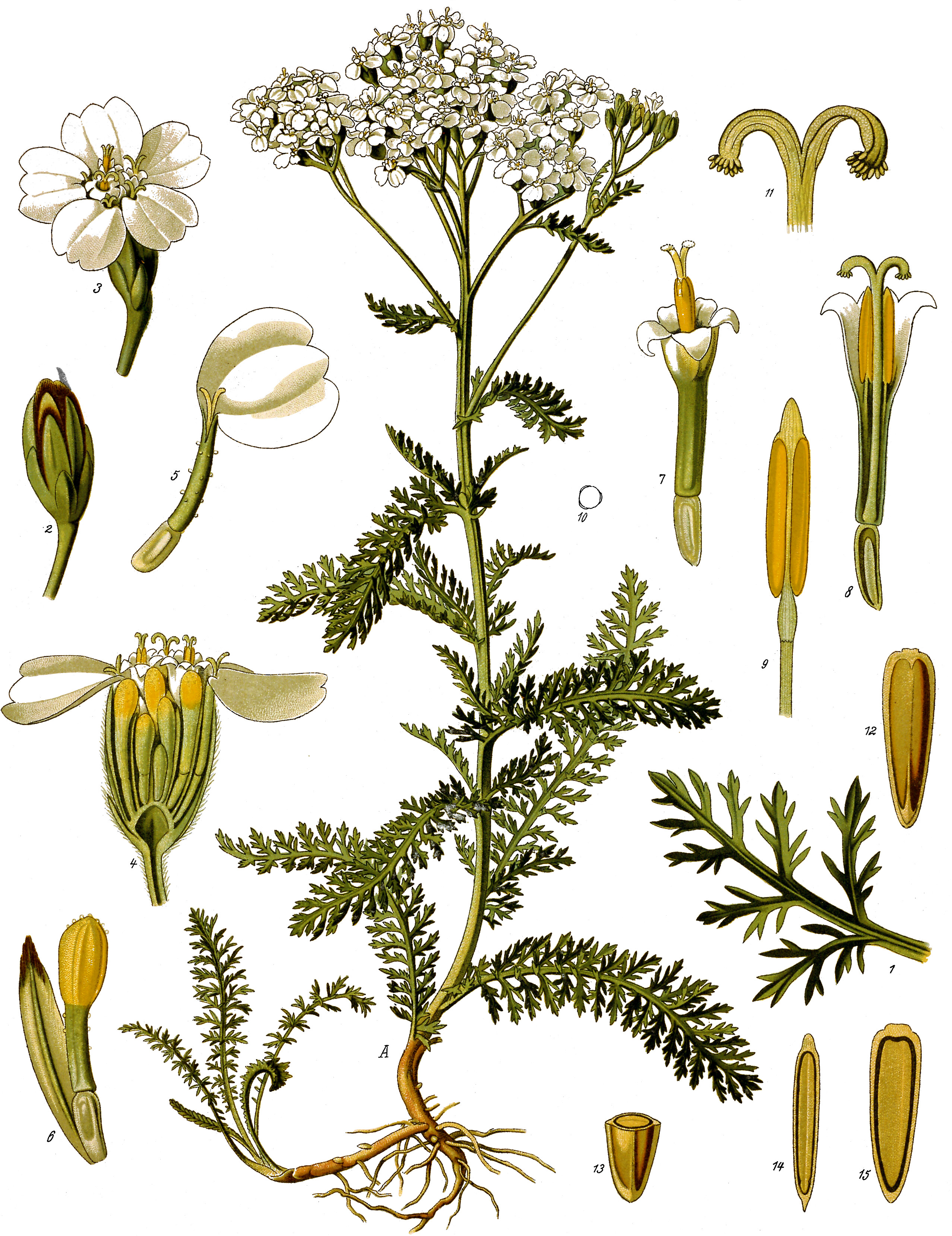
Illustration from Köhler's Medicinal Plants (1887–1898)

Achillea millefolium is an erect, herbaceous, perennial plant that produces one to several stems 0.2–1 metre (8–40 inches) in height, and has a spreading rhizomatous growth form. Cauline and more or less clasping, the leaves appear spirally and evenly along the stem, with the largest and most petiolate towards the base; they are 5–20 centimetres (2–8 in) long and fernlike, divided bipinnately or tripinnately.

The inflorescence has 4 to 9 phyllaries and contains ray and disk flowers which are white to pink, blooming from March to October. There are generally 3 to 8 ray flowers, which are 3 millimetres (1/8 in) long and ovate to round. The tiny disk flowers range from 10 to 40. The inflorescence is produced in a flat-topped capitulum cluster and the inflorescences are visited by many insect species, and has a generalized pollination system. The small achene-like fruits are called cypsela.

The plant has a distinct spicy scent that persists when dried and may be irritating to some.

=== Chemistry ===
The dark blue essential oil of yarrow contains chemicals called proazulenes.

Chamazulene and δ-cadinol are chemical compounds found in A. millefolium. The chromophore of azulene was discovered in yarrow and wormwood and named in 1863 by Septimus Piesse.

Yarrow contains isovaleric acid, salicylic acid, asparagine, sterols, and flavonoids. It also contains phenolic acids such as gallic acid, 3, 4-dihydroxy benzoic acid, chlorogenic acid, vanillic acid, caffeic acid, syringic acid, p-coumaric acid, sinapic acid, ferulic acid, cinnamic acid and flavonoid such as myricetin, hesperidin, quercetin, luteolin, kaempferol, apigenin, rutin, hyperoside.

It contains small amounts of thujone.

=== Similar species ===
Yarrow and the highly poisonous hemlock appear superficially similar, especially their umbel-style inflorescences.

== Taxonomy ==
=== Subdivision ===
The several varieties and subspecies include:

- Achillea millefolium subsp. millefolium
  - A. m. subsp. m. var. millefolium – Europe, Asia
  - A. m. subsp. m. var. borealis – Arctic regions
  - A. m. subsp. m. var. rubra – Southern Appalachians
- A. millefolium subsp. chitralensis – western Himalaya
- A. millefolium subsp. sudetica – Alps, Carpathians
- Achillea millefolium var. alpicola – Western United States, Alaska
- Achillea millefolium var. californica – California, Pacific Northwest
- Achillea millefolium var. occidentalis – North America
- Achillea millefolium var. pacifica – west coast of North America, Alaska
- Achillea millefolium var. puberula – endemic to California

=== Etymology ===
The genus name Achillea (Latin for 'Achillean') is derived from mythical Greek character Achilles who, by legend, carried it with his army to treat battle wounds. The specific epithet millefolium (Latin for 'thousand-leaves') comes from the featherlike leaves which are minutely divided.

== Distribution and habitat ==
Yarrow is native to temperate regions of the Northern Hemisphere, being found in Europe, Asia, and North America.

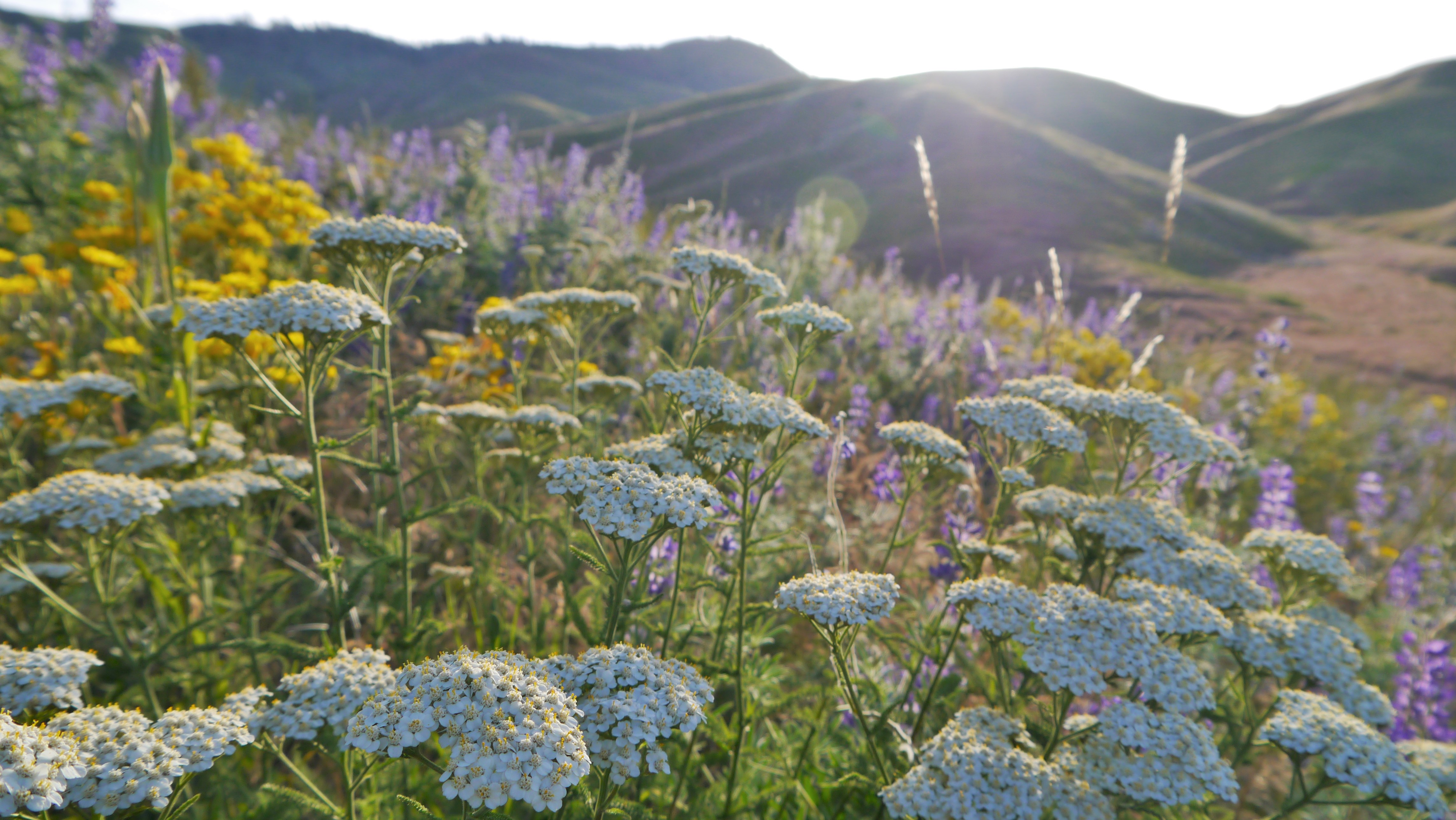
Wenatchee Foothills, Chelan County, Washington

The plant grows from sea level to 3,500 m (11,500 ft) in elevation. Common yarrow is frequently found in the mildly disturbed soil of grasslands and open forests. Active growth occurs in the spring.

In North America, both native and introduced genotypes, and both diploid and polyploid plants are found. It is found in every habitat throughout California except the Colorado and Mojave Deserts.

It has been introduced as a feed for livestock in New Zealand and Australia, where it is a common weed of both wet and dry areas, such as roadsides, meadows, fields and coastal places.

== Ecology ==
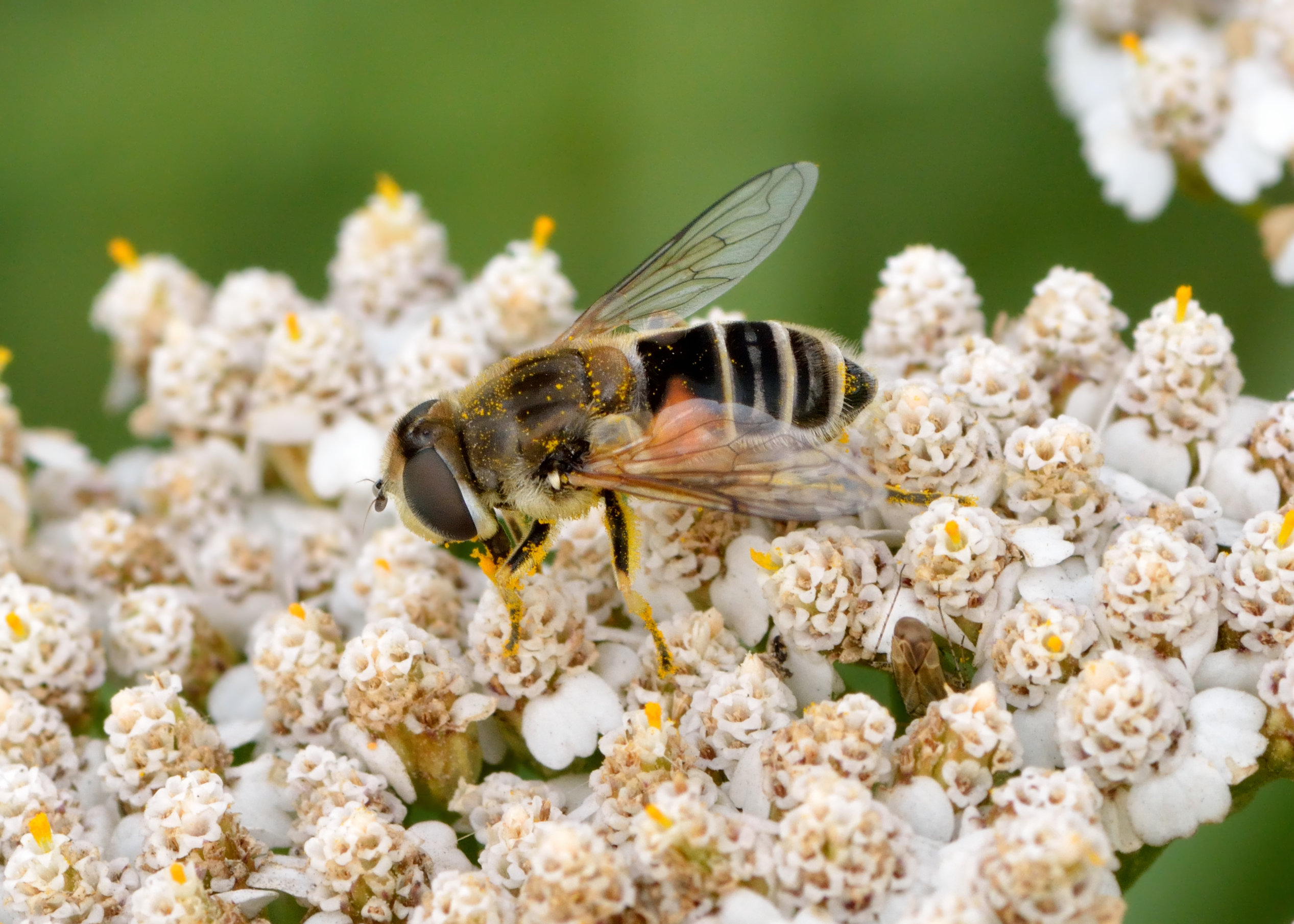
Pollination by Eristalis arbustorum

Several cavity-nesting birds, including the common starling, use yarrow to line their nests. Experiments conducted on the tree swallow, which does not use yarrow, suggest that adding yarrow to nests inhibits the growth of parasites.

Achillea millefolium is a food source for many species of insects, including the larvae of a number of moths, although is not particularly attractive to ladybirds.

Aceria kiefferi (Nalepa, 1891) is a mite that causes galls on A. millefolium.

== Cultivation ==
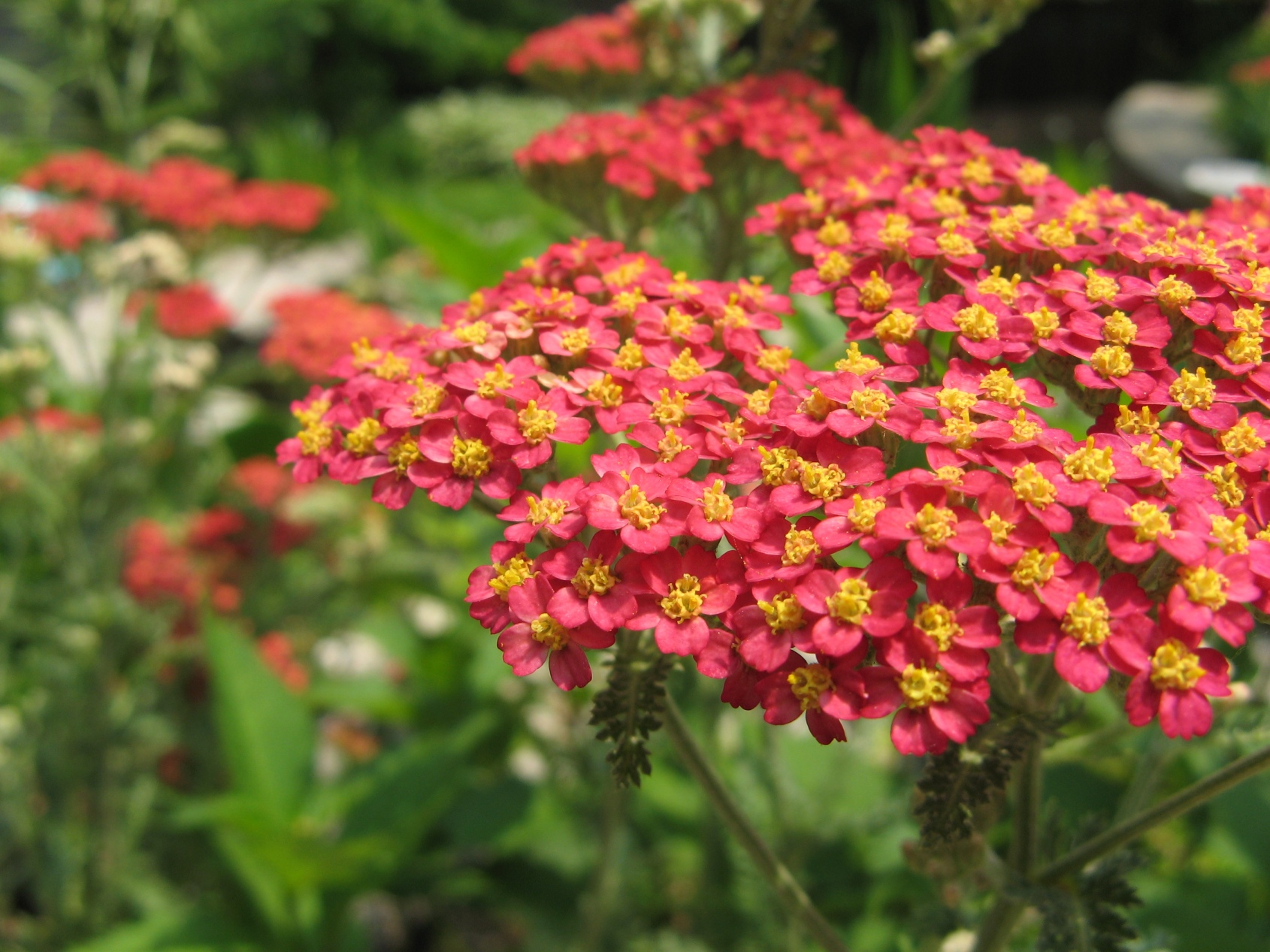
A. millefolium 'Paprika' cultivar

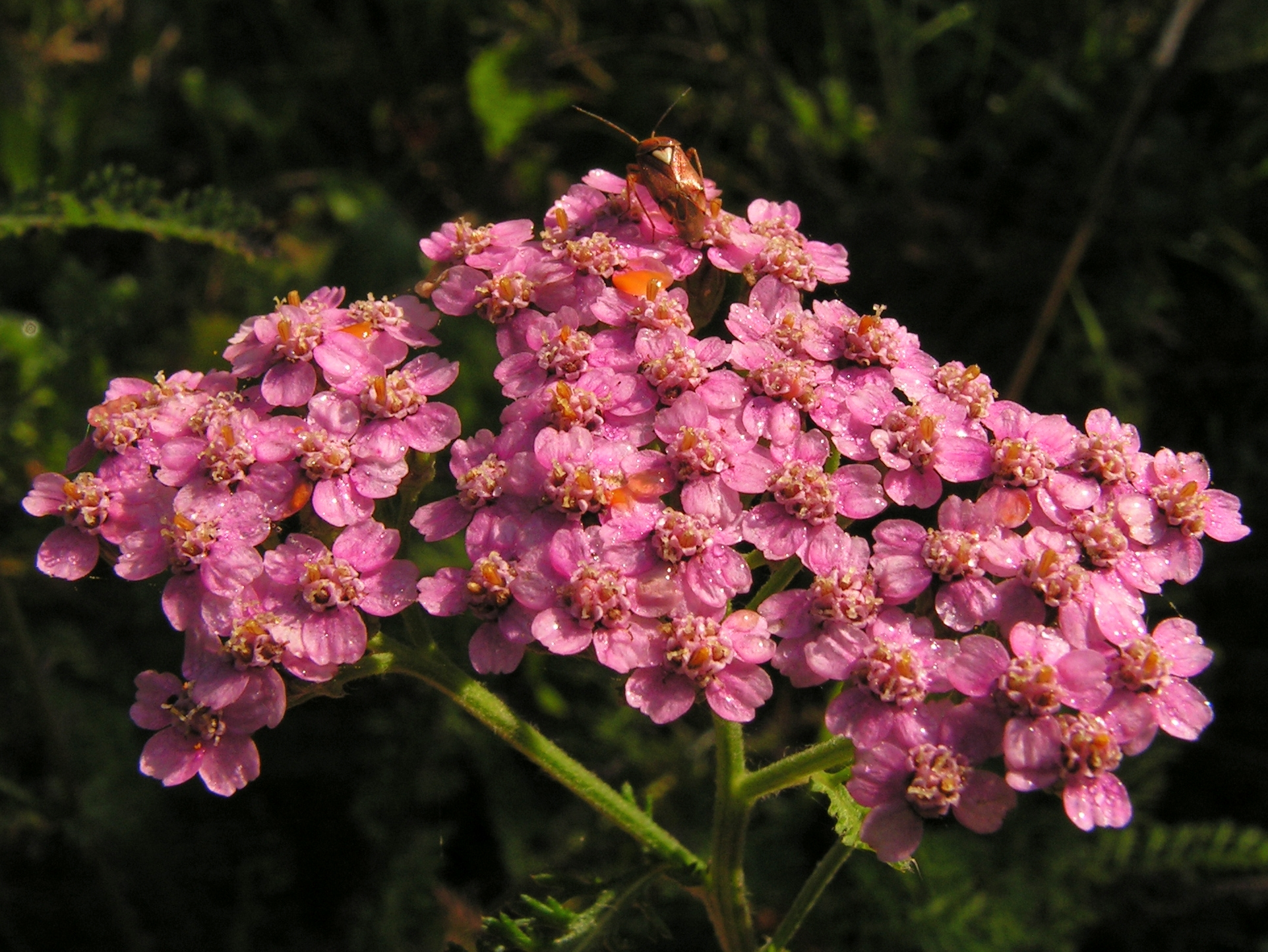
A. millefolium cultivar

Achillea millefolium is cultivated as an ornamental plant by many plant nurseries. It is planted in gardens and natural landscaping settings of diverse climates and styles. They include native plant, drought-tolerant, and wildlife gardens. The plant is a frequent component of butterfly gardens. The plant prefers well-drained soil in full sun, but can be grown in less ideal conditions. Field trials in Kansas found yarrow produced an average yield of 110,000 plants per hectare (43,000/acre), with a total dry weight of 11,800 kg/ha (10,500 pounds per acre).

=== Propagation ===
For propagation, seeds require light for germination, so optimal germination occurs when planted no deeper than 6 mm (1/4 in). Seeds also require a germination temperature of 18–24 °C (64–75 °F). It has a relatively short life in some situations, but may be prolonged by division in the spring every other year, and planting 30 to 46 cm (12–18 in) apart. It can become invasive.

=== Cultivars ===
The species use in traditional gardens has generally been superseded by cultivars with specific 'improved' qualities. Some are used as drought-tolerant lawns, with periodic mowing. The many different ornamental cultivars include: 'Paprika', 'Cerise Queen', 'Red Beauty', 'Red Velvet', 'Saucy Seduction', 'Strawberry Seduction' (red), 'Island Pink' (pink), 'Calistoga' (white), and 'Sonoma Coast' (white). The following are recipients of the Royal Horticultural Society's Award of Garden Merit:

- 'Credo'
- 'Lachsschönheit' (Galaxy Series)
- 'Martina'
- 'Lansdorferglut'

The many hybrids of this species designated Achillea × taygetea are useful garden subjects, including: 'Appleblossom', 'Fanal', 'Hoffnung', and 'Moonshine'.

== Toxicity ==
Yarrow can cause allergic skin rashes.

According to the American Society for the Prevention of Cruelty to Animals, yarrow is toxic to dogs, cats, and horses, causing increased urination, vomiting, diarrhea and dermatitis. When consumed by cows, an unfavorable flavor is given to their milk.

Additionally, due to its superficial similarity to the highly toxic hemlock, the confusion of the two species can be deadly.

== Uses ==
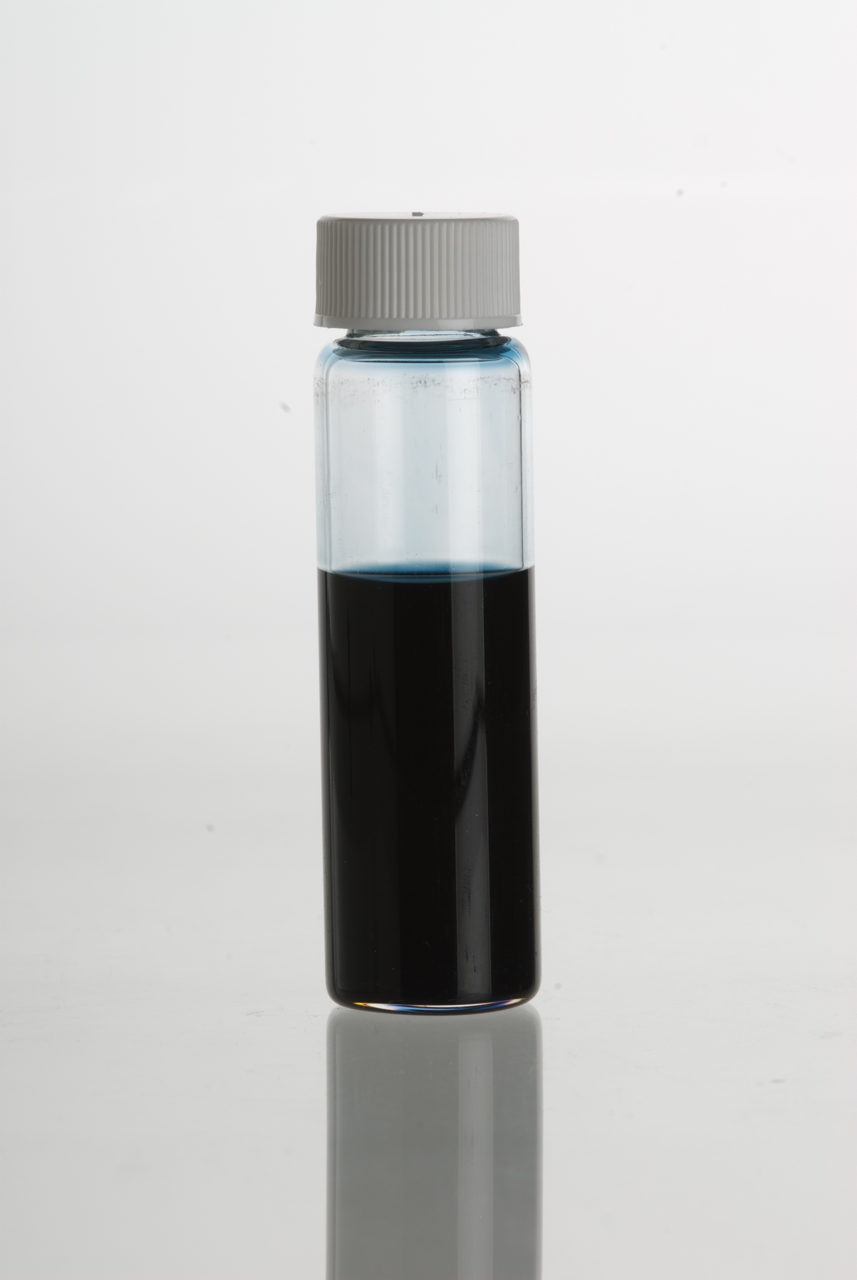
Essential oil

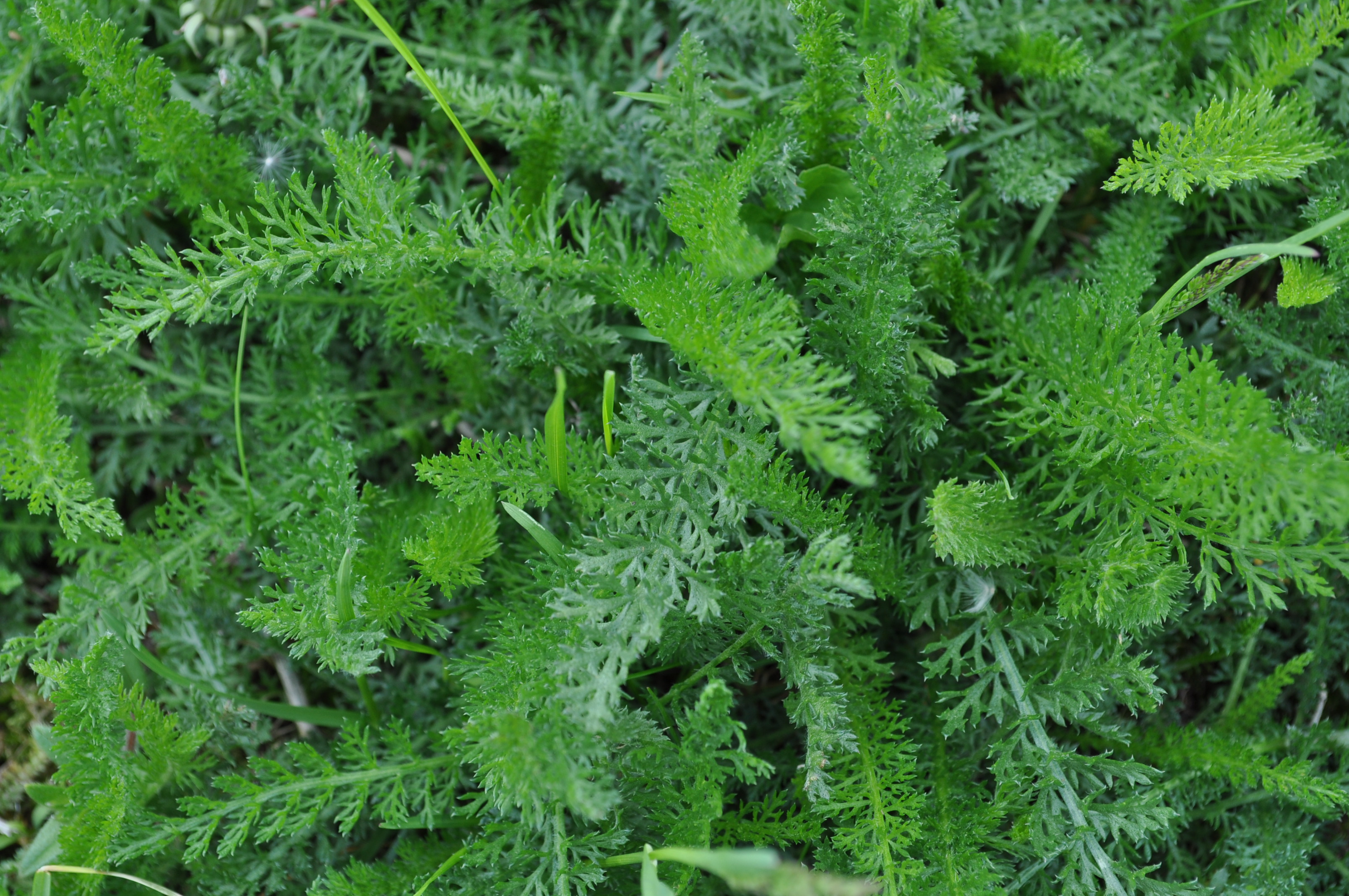
Yarrow can produce a dense mat of soft leaves.

=== Traditional medicine ===
A. millefolium was used in traditional medicine, in part due to its astringent properties and the mild laxative effect of its leaves. It was used in ancient times to heal wounds and stop bleeding, and in the 16th century, the crushed leaves were used to stop nosebleeds.

North American varieties were traditionally used by many Native American nations. The Navajo considered it a "life medicine" and chewed the plant for toothaches and used its infusions for earaches. Chumash people boiled the plant and the resulting liquid was held in the mouth to reduce toothaches; they also mashed the plants and applied the mash onto cuts and sores as a poultice or to calm bleeding wounds. The Miwok in California used the plant as an analgesic and head cold remedy. Native American nations used the plant for healing cuts and abrasions, relief from earaches and throat infections, as well as for an eyewash. Yarrow was used by Plains indigenous peoples to reduce pain or fever and aid sleep. Some Ojibwe people used a decoction of yarrow leaves on hot stones and inhaled it to treat headaches, or applied decoctions of the root onto skin for its stimulating effect.

=== Food ===
The entire plant is reportedly edible and nutritious, but it is advised not to consume much. The foliage is pungent; both its leaves and flowers are bitter and astringent. The leaves can be eaten young; raw, they can be added to salad. The leaves, with an aniseed-grass flavor, can be brewed as tea.

In the Middle Ages, yarrow was part of a herbal mixture known as gruit used in the flavoring of beer prior to the use of hops. However, medieval Dutch and German city accounts from the gruit area do not mention yarrow. It is noted by the Swedish biologist Linnaeus that the Dalecarnians infused the herb in beer. The flowers and leaves are still used in making some liquors and bitters.

=== Other uses ===
Yarrow is used as a companion plant, attracting some beneficial insects and repelling some pests.

A. millefolium can be planted to combat soil erosion due to the plant's resistance to drought. Before the arrival of monocultures of ryegrass, both grass and pasture contained A. millefolium at a density of about 0.3 kg/ha. One factor for its use in grass mixtures was its deep roots, with leaves rich in minerals, minimizing mineral deficiencies in ruminant feed. It was introduced into New Zealand as a drought-tolerant pasture.

Yarrow can be used for dying wool; depending on the mordant, the color may be green to yellow.

== Culture ==
Yarrow has been found with Neanderthal burials, suggesting its association with human species dates to at least 60,000 years ago.

=== China ===
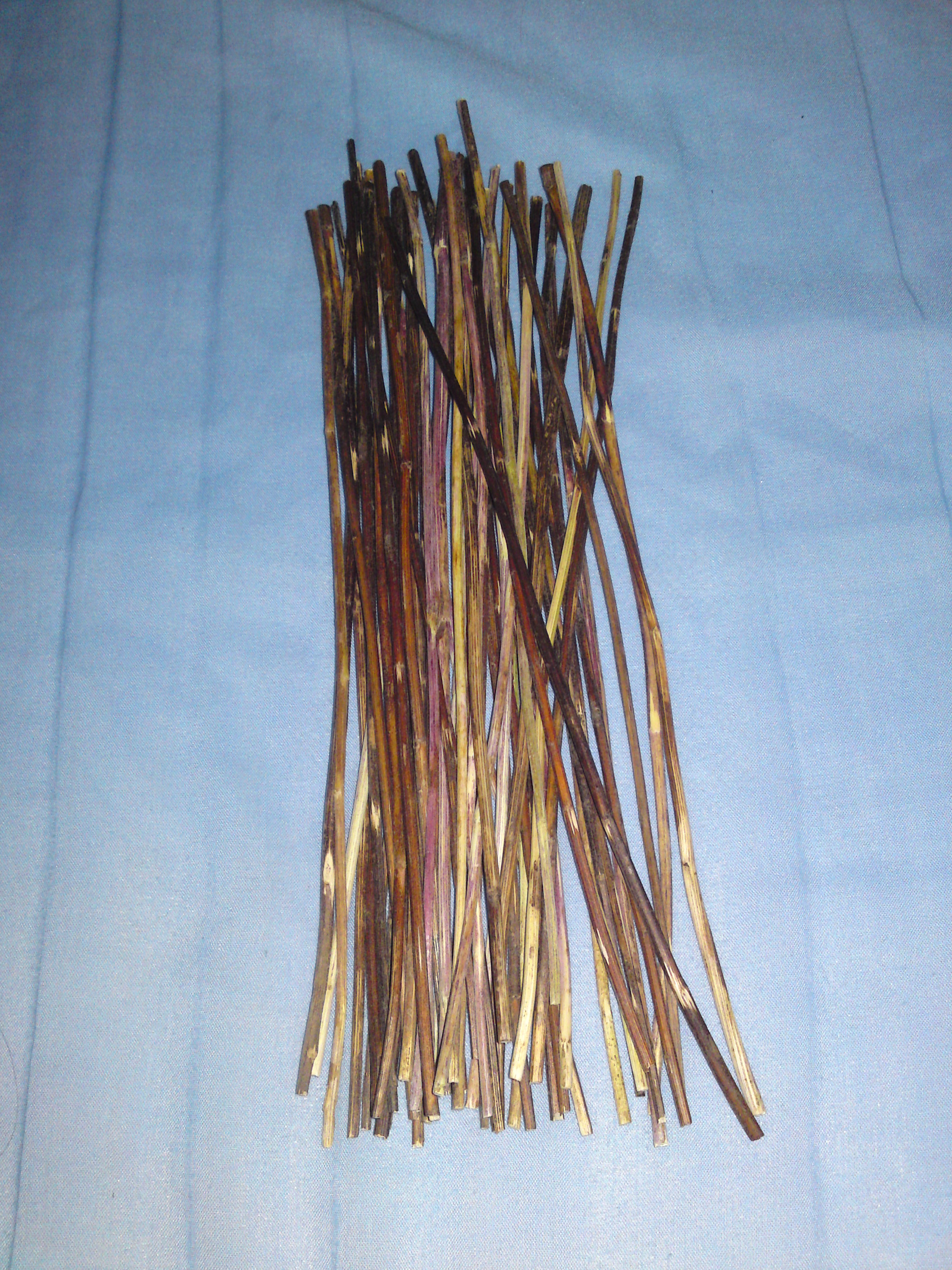
A bunch of 50 yarrow A. millefolium subsp. millefolium var. millefolium stalks, used for I Ching divination

Yarrow and tortoiseshell are considered to be lucky in Chinese tradition.

Dried yarrow stalks are used in I Ching divination.

=== Native American ===
Yarrow is an important medicinal plant in the ethnobotany of multiple indigenous peoples of North America. The Samala tribe of Chumash people called the plant steleq' 'a'emet meaning 'tail of the ground squirrel,' referring to its appearance. The Spanish name yerba muela or yerba de la muela (meaning 'molar tooth herb') referred to its use by native people as a medicinal herb for toothaches.

=== Western world ===
In antiquity, the plant was known as herba militaris for its use in stanching the flow of blood from wounds. In the Classical Greek epic Iliad, Homer tells of the centaur Chiron, who conveyed herbal secrets to his human pupils and taught Achilles to use yarrow on the battlegrounds of Troy. The genus name Achillea is inspired by the alleged use of the herb by Achilles to treat his soldiers' wounds. Other names implying the plant's historical use in healing—particularly in the military—include bloodwort, knight's milfoil, staunchweed, and, from its use in the United States Civil War, soldier's woundwort. Its use in either starting or stopping nosebleeds led to the common name nosebleed.

The English name yarrow comes from its Saxon (Old English) name gearwe, which is related to both the Dutch word gerw (alternately yerw) and the Old High German word garawa. In the eastern counties it may be called yarroway. It was called old man's pepper due to its pungent flavor, while the name field hop came from its use in beer making in Sweden.

In the Hebrides, a leaf held against the eyes was sometimes believed to give second sight. In the witchcraft trial of Elspeth Reoch in March 1616, she was alleged to have plucked "melefour", thought to be another name for yarrow, and said "In nomine Patris, Fiili, et Spiritus Sancti" to become able to cure distemper (disorders of the four humours) and impart the faculty of prediction. For its association with the Abrahamic devil it was called bad man's plaything, devil's nettle, and devil's plaything. Yarrow was thought to bring luck due to being, according to one woman cited by James Britten (c. 1878), "the first herb our Saviour put in His hand when a child". This is apparently a corruption of the Achilles myth in which Jesus uses the plant to heal his adoptive father. For this reason, in France, it was called herbe de St. Joseph, and it has also been called carpenter's weed in this regard.

Various other common names include arrowroot, death flower, eerie, hundred-leaved grass, knyghten, old man's mustard, sanguinary, seven-year's love, snake's grass, and soldier. The names milfoil and thousand leaf come refer to the minutely divided leaves. In Spanish, it is known as gordaldo and, in New Mexico and southern Colorado, plumajillo (Spanish for 'little feather').

In Sussex and Devonshire superstition, yarrow was used for finding one's real sweetheart. One would pluck yarrow growing on a young man's grave while reciting:

Yarrow, sweet yarrow, the first that I have found,
in the name of Jesus Christ, I pluck it from the ground;
As Joseph loved sweet Mary, and took her for his dear,
so in a dream this night, I hope, my true love will appear.

and go to sleep with the yarrow under the pillow.

In a similar tradition in Wicklow, girls would pick yarrow on Hallow Eve and recite:

Thou pretty herb of Venus' tree,
Thy true name is yarrow;
Now who my bosom friend may be,
Pray tell thou me to-morrow.

then retire for the night without speaking and go to sleep with an ounce of yarrow sewn in flannel under the pillow.

In Suffolk a leaf was placed in the nose so it would bleed, while reciting

Green 'arrow, green 'arrow, you bears a white blow,
If my love love me, my nose will bleed now;
If my love don't love me, it 'on't bleed a drop,
If my love do love me, 'twill bleed every drop.

In Dublin on May Day or the night before, women would place a stocking full of yarrow under their pillow and recite:

Good morrow, good yarrow, good morrow to thee,
I hope by the yarrow my lover to see;
And that he may be married to me.
The colour of his hair and the clothes he does wear,
And if he be for me may his face be turned to me,
And if he be not, dark and surely may he be,
And his back be turned toward me.

== Gallery ==
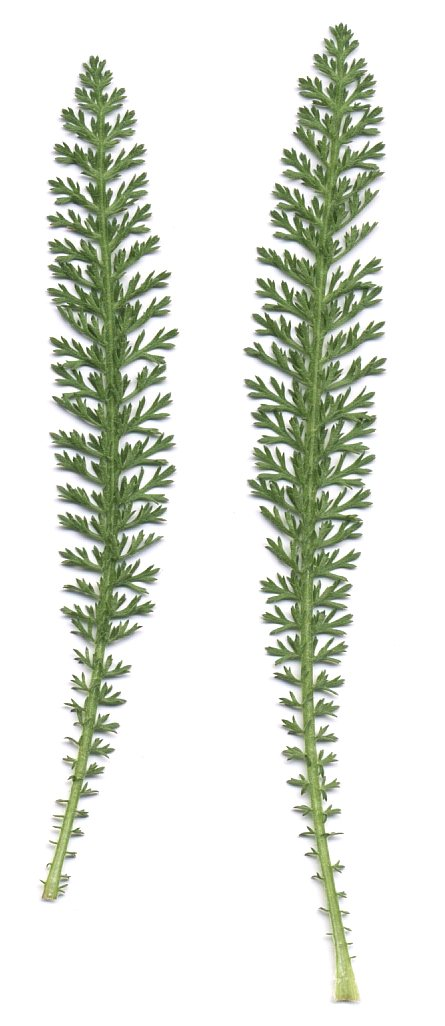
Leaves

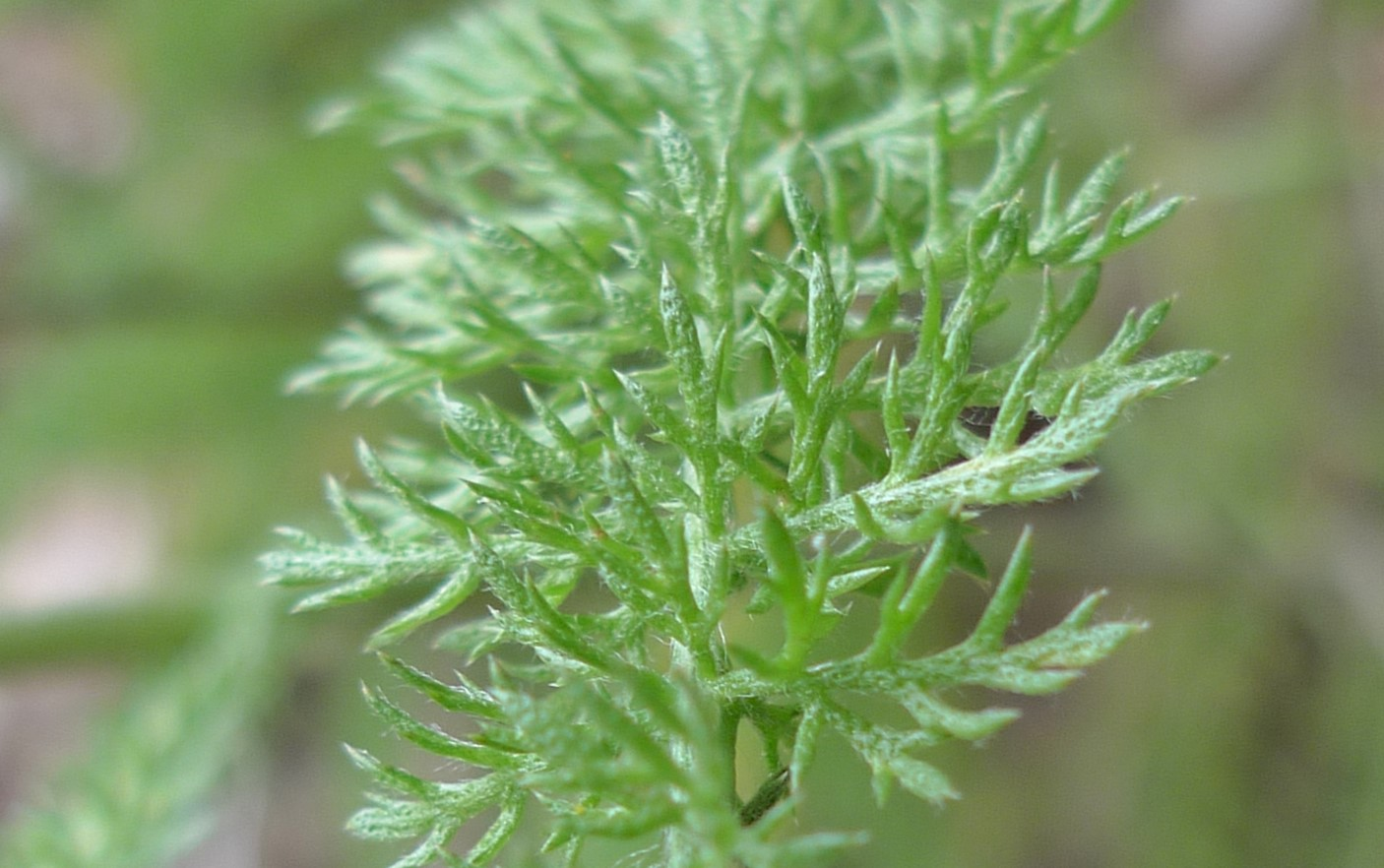
Close-up of leaf

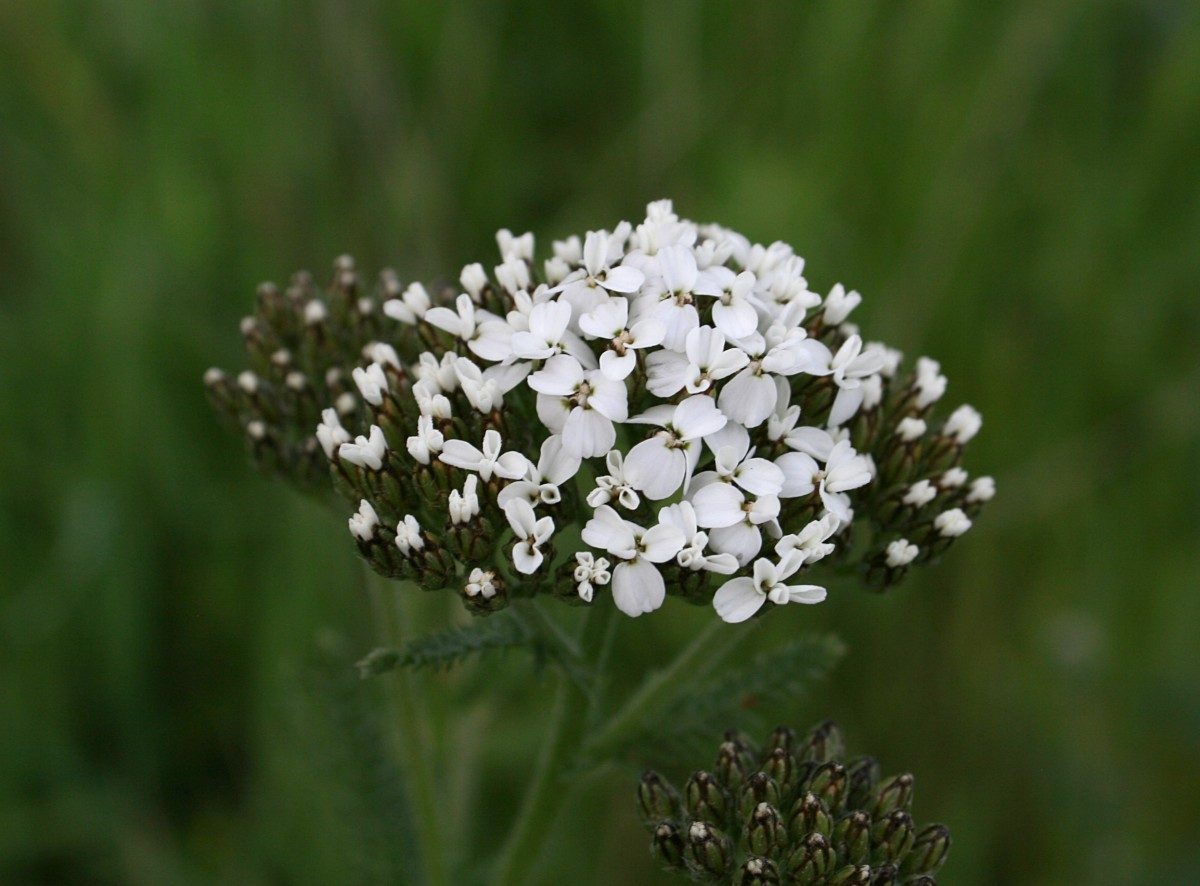
Budding flowers

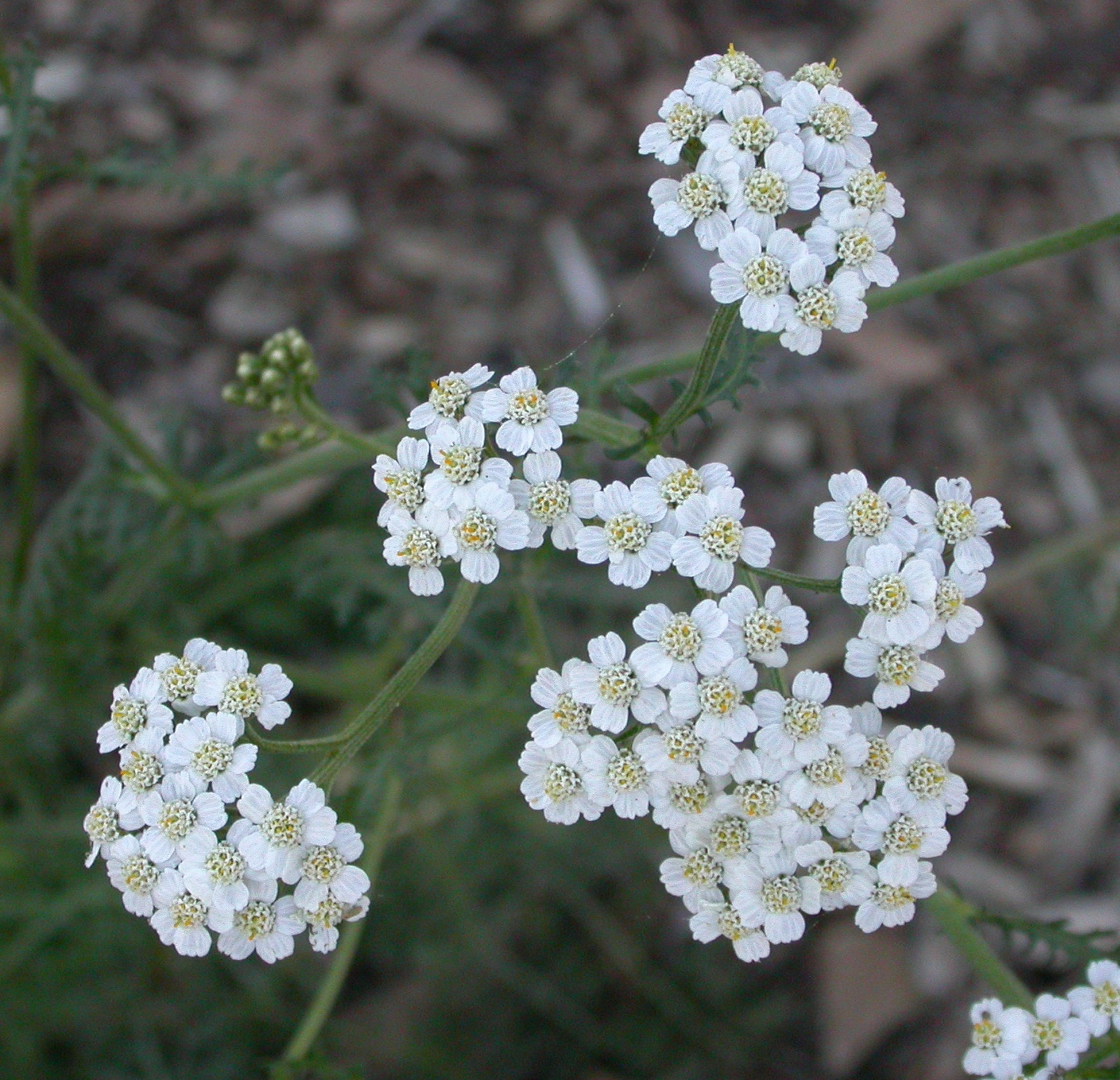
Flowers at California State Polytechnic University, Pomona

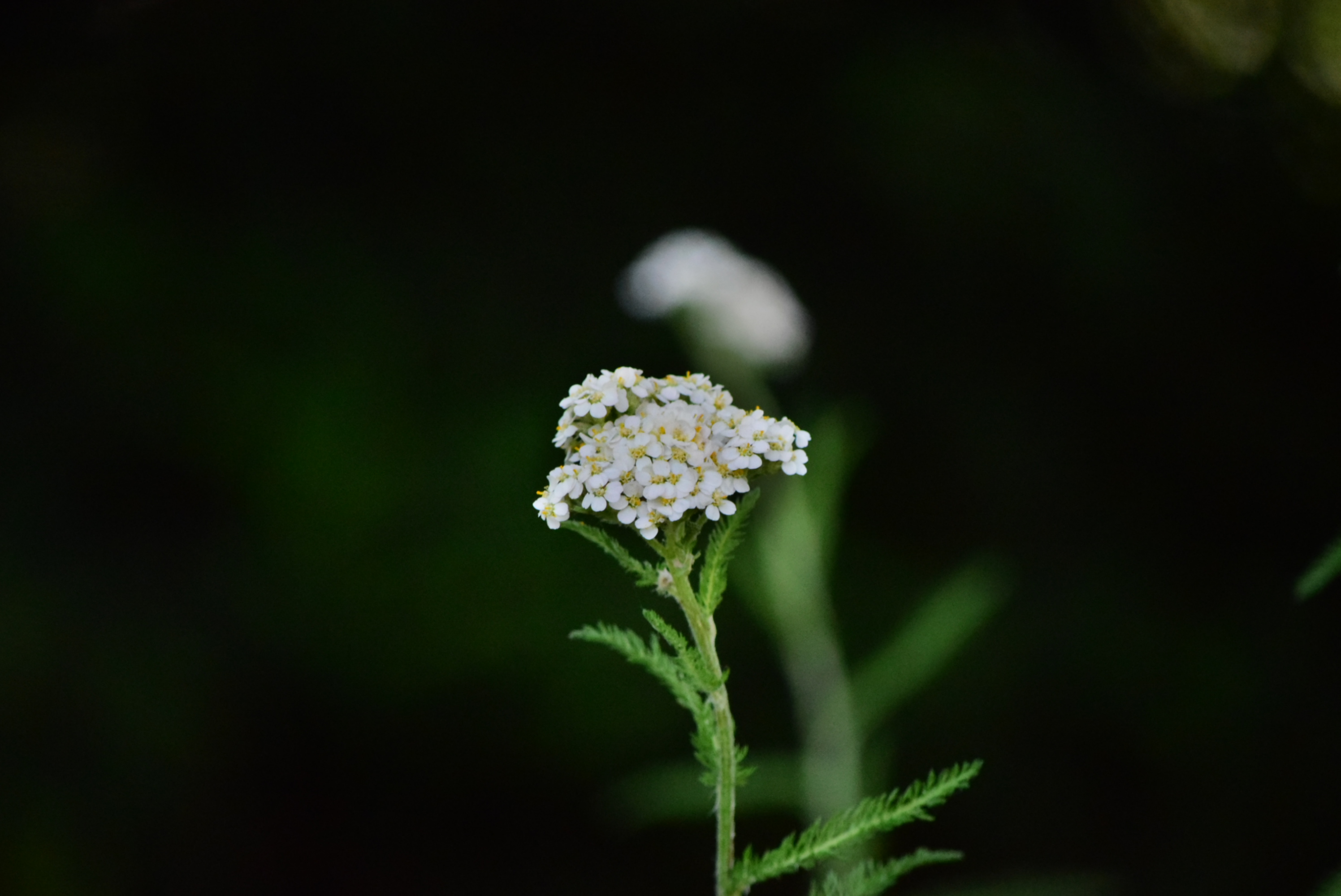
Flower by a pond, United Kingdom

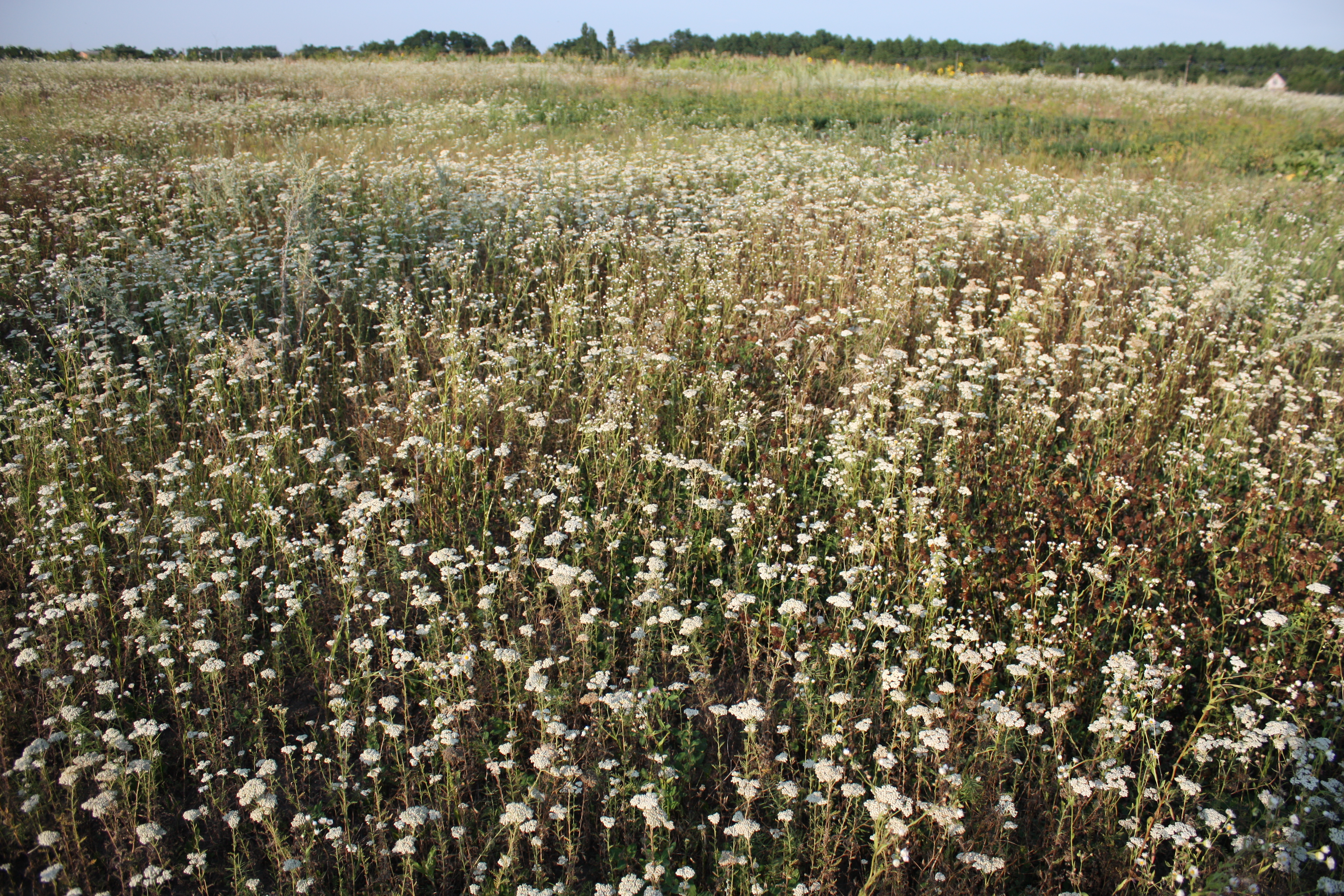
Field of yarrow in Russia

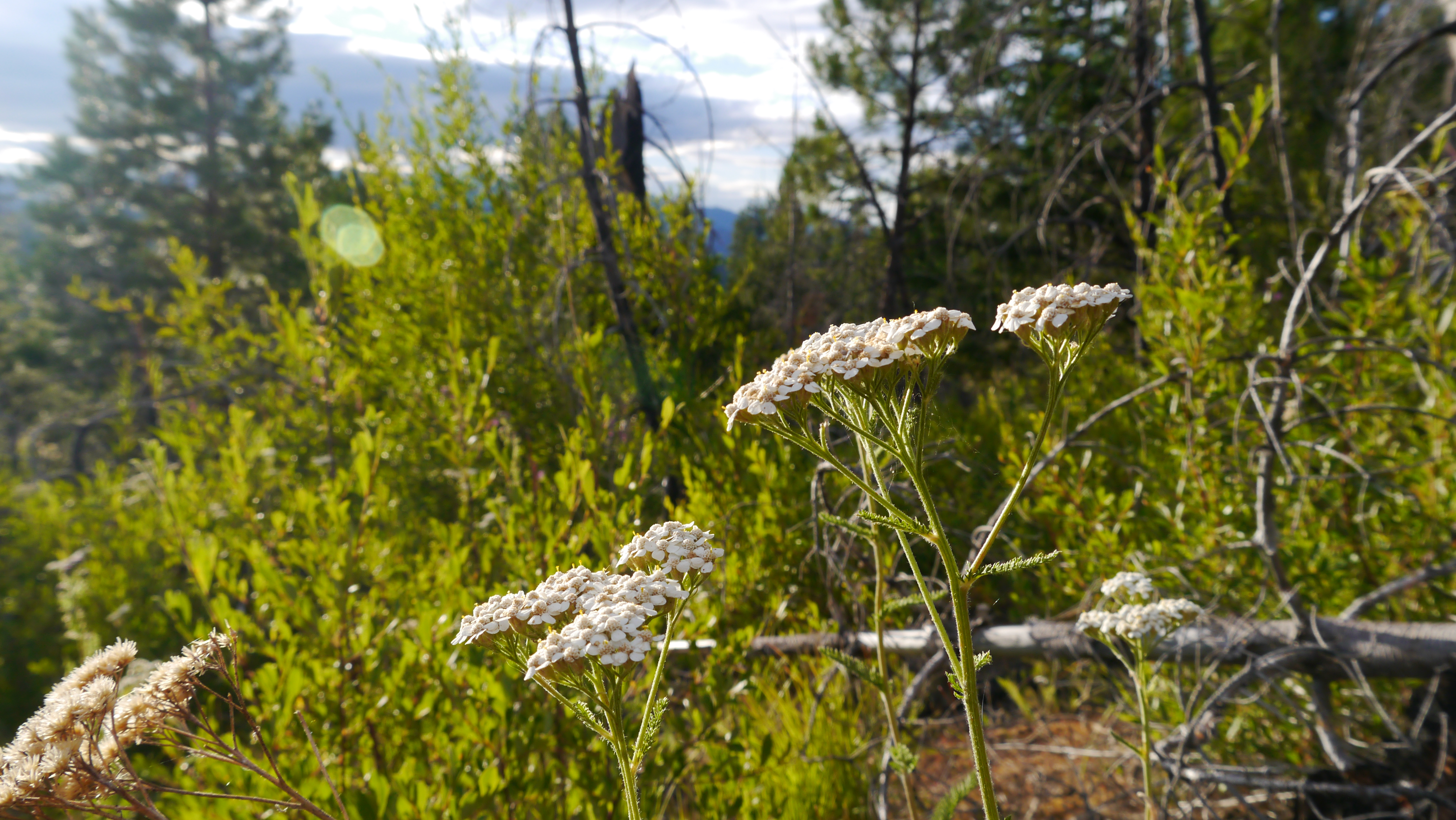
Flowers in Chelan County, Washington

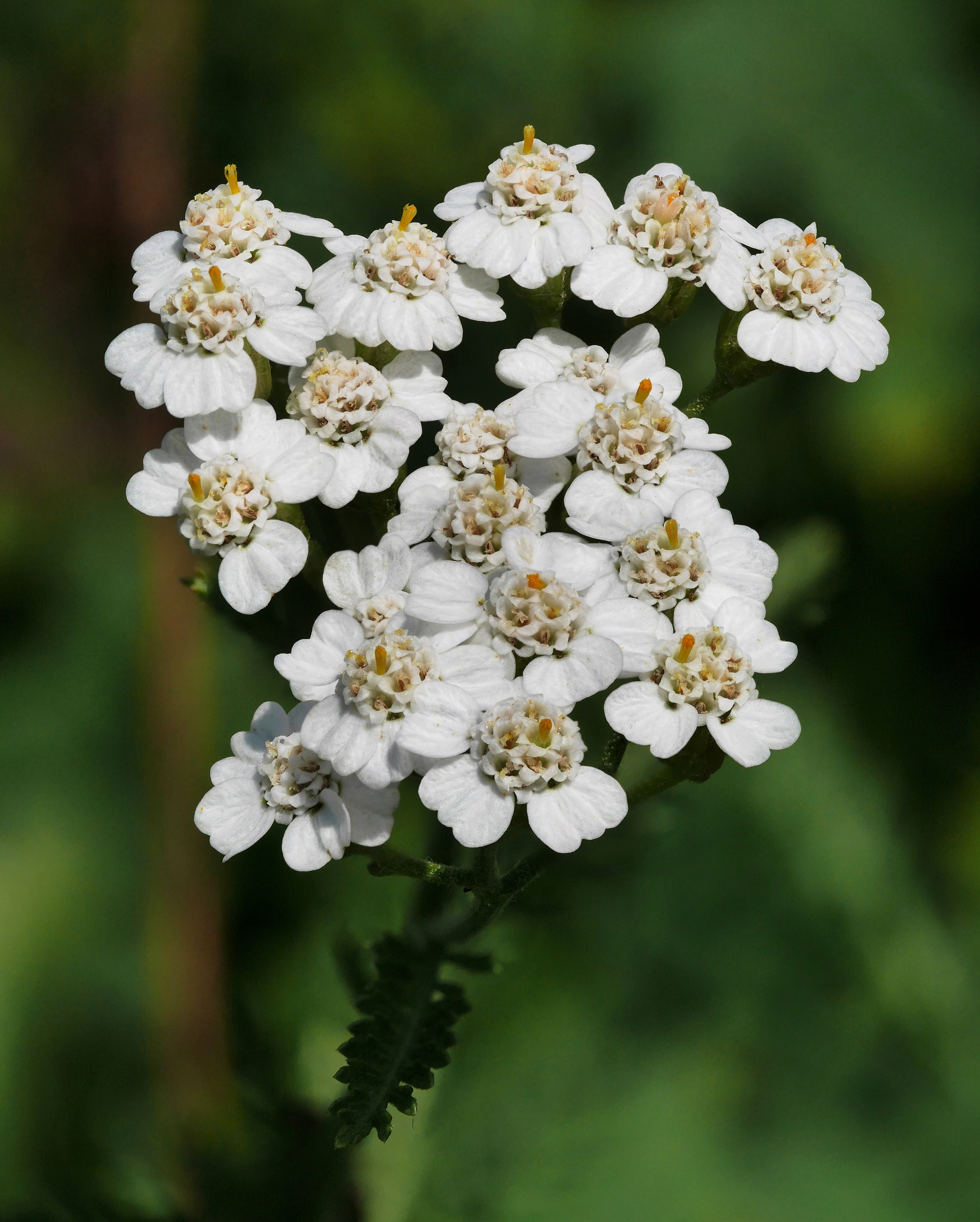
Close-up of flowers

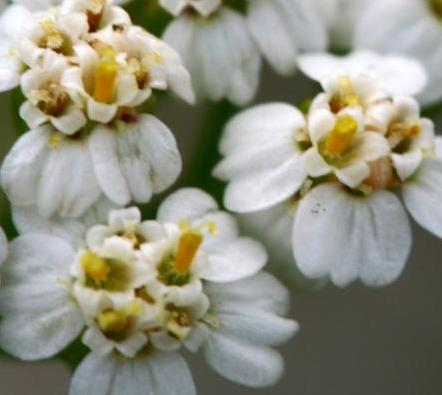
Extreme close-up of flowers

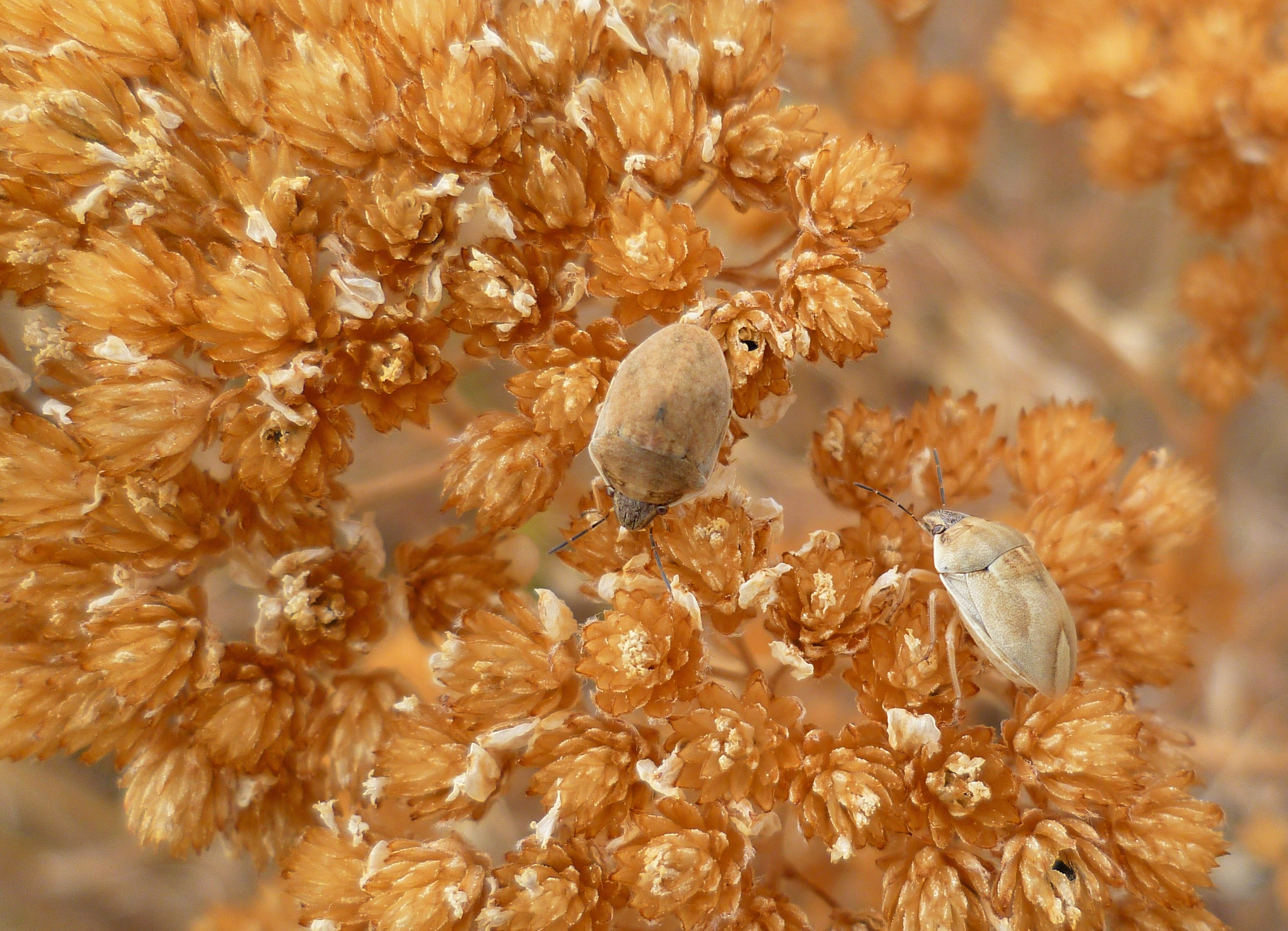
Dry flowers with Hemiptera

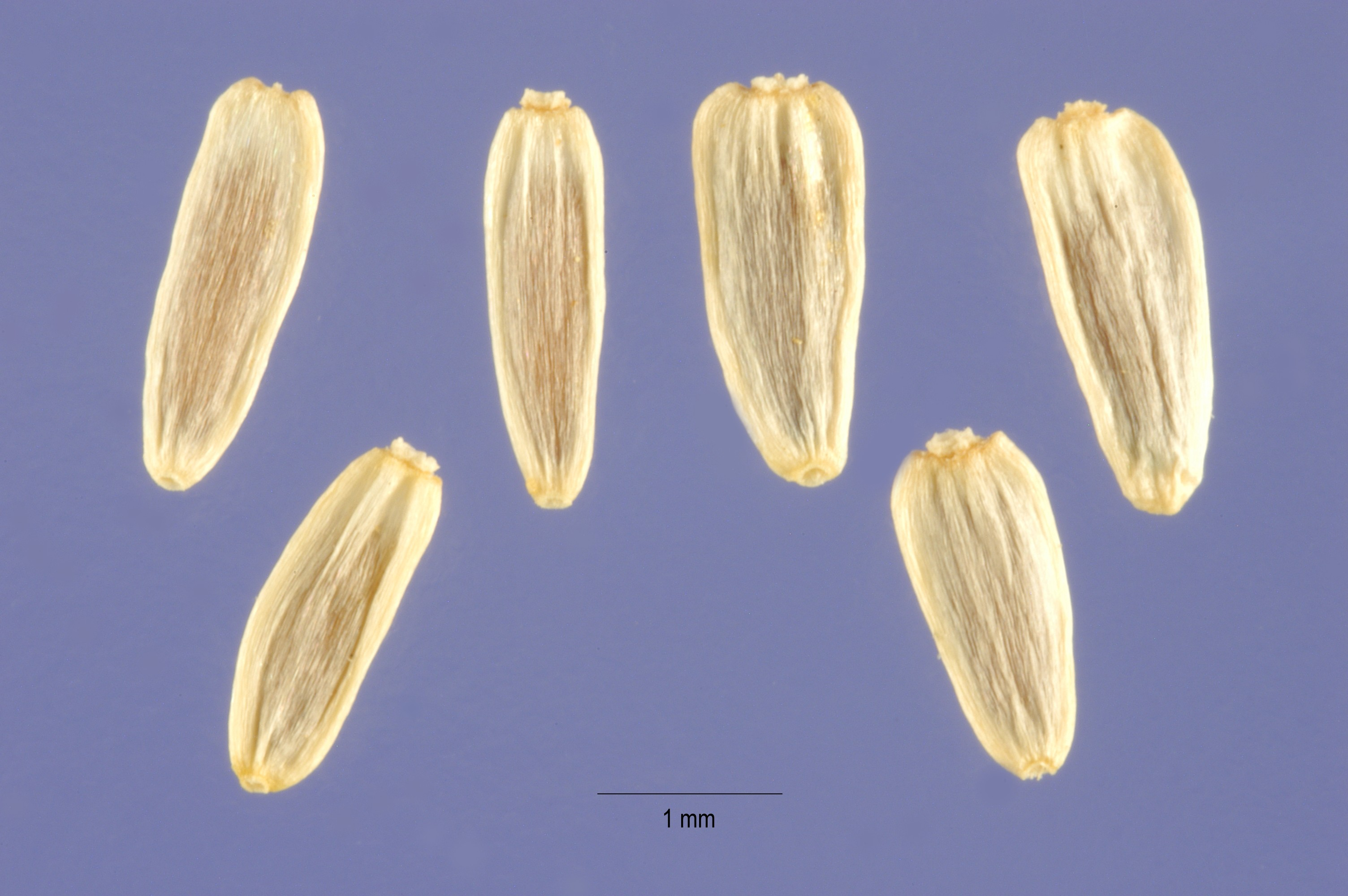
Achenes
