= Yarrow oil =

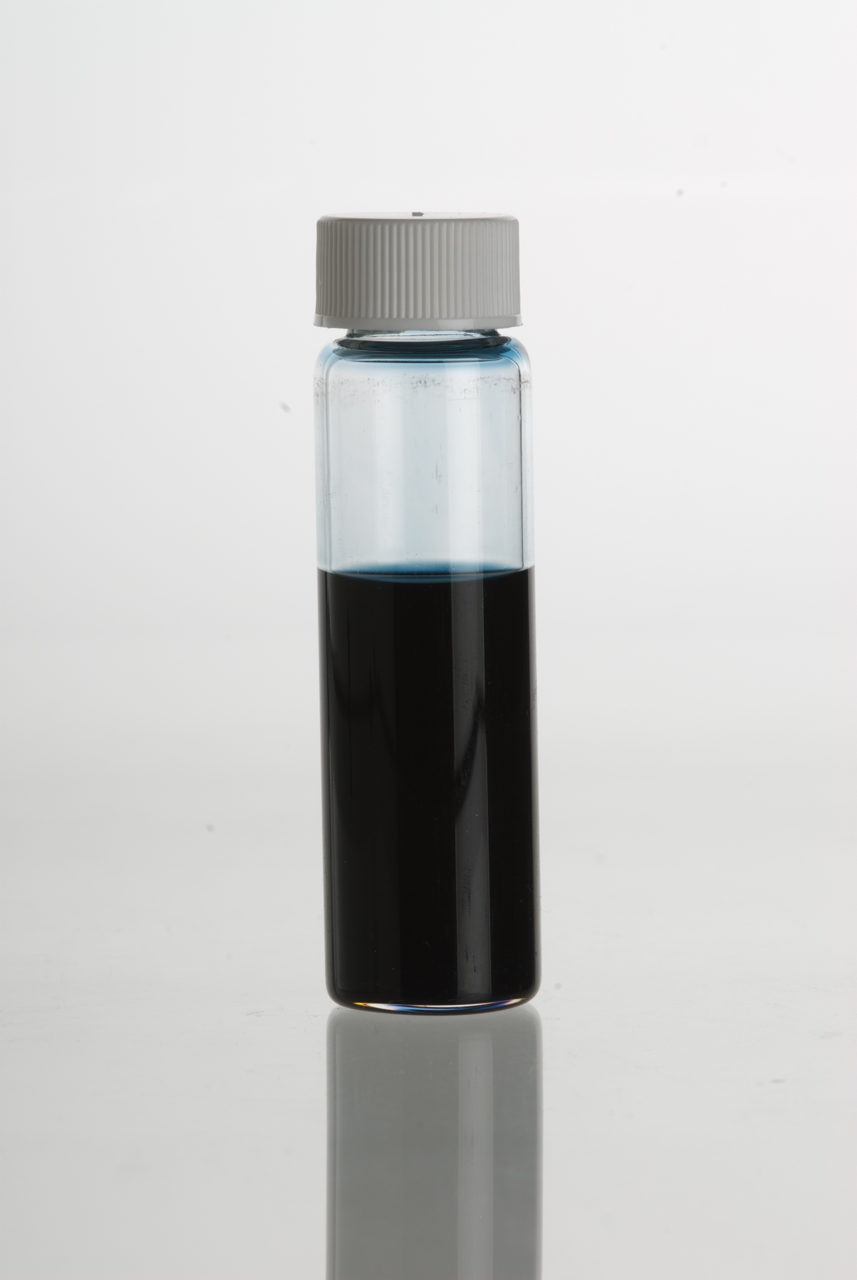
Yarrow (Achillea millefolium) essential oil in a colorless glass vial

Yarrow essential oil is a volatile oil including the chemical proazulene. The dark blue essential oil is extracted by steam distillation of the flowers of yarrow (Achillea millefolium).

The deep blue coloured oil has an aroma described as "herbal, green tea, chamomile, rosemary, floral, creamy".

It kills the larvae of the mosquito Aedes albopictus.
