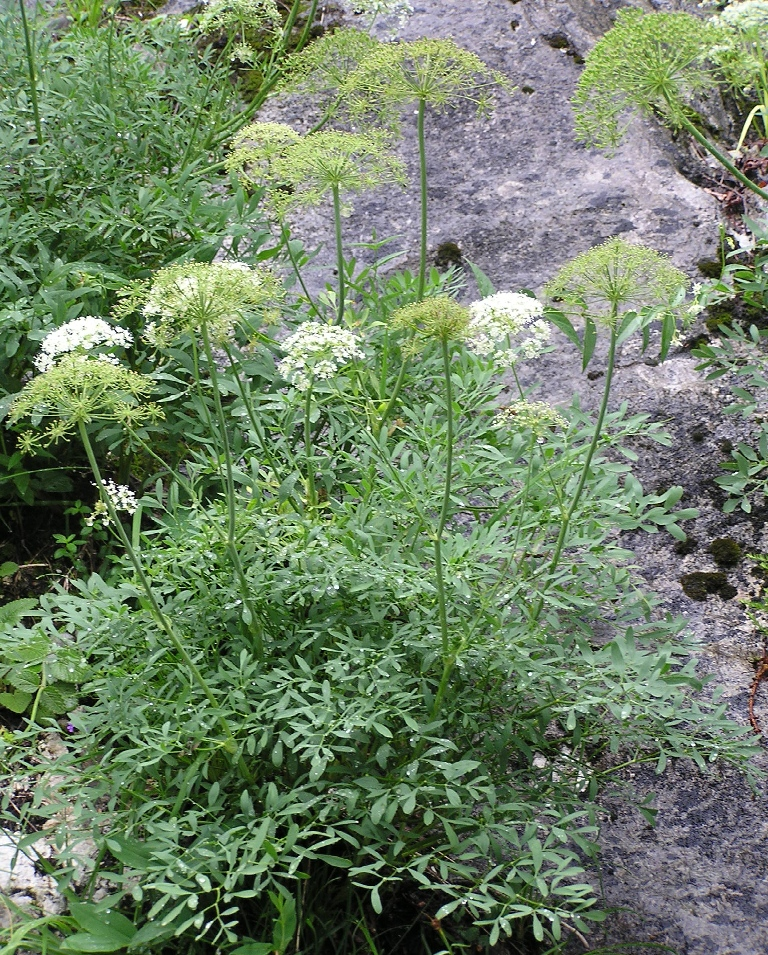
- Siler montanum

Scientific classification
- Kingdom: Plantae
- Clade: Tracheophytes
- Clade: Angiosperms
- Clade: Eudicots
- Clade: Asterids
- Order: Apiales
- Family: Apiaceae
- Subfamily: Apioideae
- Tribe: Scandiceae
- Subtribe: Daucinae
- Genus: Siler; Mill.

= Siler (plant) =

Genus of flowering plants

Siler is a genus of flowering plants in the family Apiaceae. It includes four species native to southern and central Europe.

== Species ==
Four species are accepted.

- Siler garganicum (Ten.) Thell. – southeastern Italy, Albania, former Yugoslavia, and Bulgaria
- Siler montanum Crantz – mountains of southwestern and Central Europe
- Siler siculum (Spreng.) Thell. – northern Sicily
- Siler zernyi (Hayek) Thell. – Albania, Bulgaria, Greece, and former Yugoslavia
