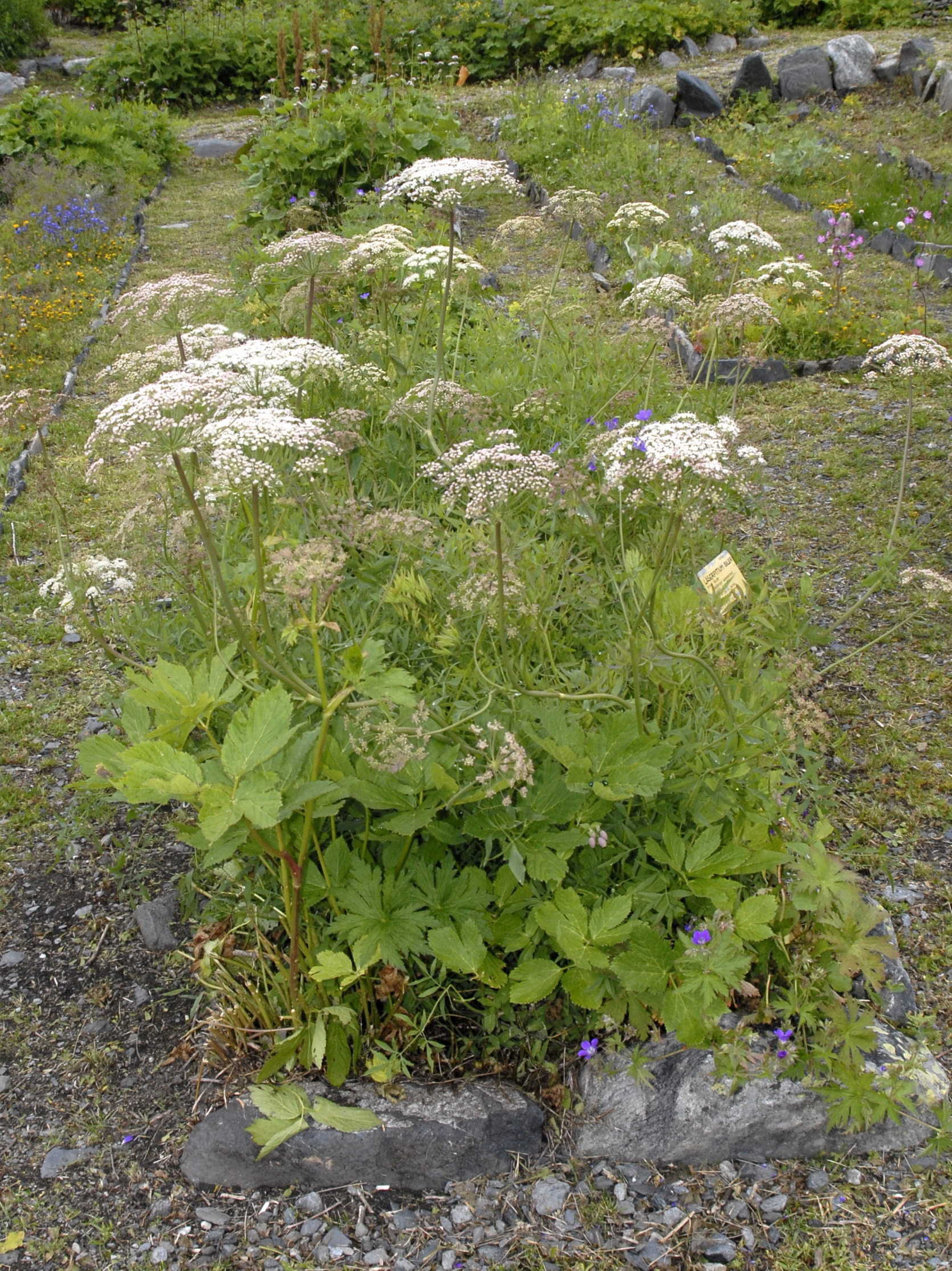

Scientific classification
- Kingdom: Plantae
- Clade: Embryophytes
- Clade: Tracheophytes
- Clade: Spermatophytes
- Clade: Angiosperms
- Clade: Eudicots
- Clade: Asterids
- Order: Apiales
- Family: Apiaceae
- Genus: Siler
- Species: S. montanum

Binomial name
- Siler montanum Crantz

Subspecies
- 5; see text

Synonyms
- Daucus siler (L.) E.H.L.Krause; Lacellia montana (Crantz) Bubani; Laser siler (L.) Druce; Laserpitium montanum (Crantz) Lam.; Laserpitium siler L.; Siler siler (L.) Druce

= Siler montanum =

Species of flowering plant

Siler montanum, Laserpitium siler, the laserwort, is a herbaceous perennial plant in the family Apiaceae. It is a robust perennial that can reach a height of about 30–100 centimetres (12–39 in). It has bipinnate, alternate leaves, and produces compound umbels of white five-stellate flowers from June to August.

This species can be found in central and southern Europe, in the Alps, the Pyrenees, the Apennine Mountains and the Iberian Mountains. It occurs in gorges and rocky slopes at elevations of 800–2,250 metres (2,620–7,380 ft).

== Subspecies ==
The genus Laserpitium L. (Apiaceae) consists of approximately twenty aromatic perennial herbaceous species, predominantly endemic to the Mediterranean region and Southwest Asia, although their distribution extends from the Canary Islands to Iran and Siberia. The genus is particularly diverse in mountainous areas of southern and central Europe, where around fourteen species are listed in Flora Europaea. Laserpitium siler L., also known as laserwort or Siler montanum Crantz, is one of the most well-known species. It is found in rocky meadows at altitudes of approximately 1400 m in the submeridional-montane regions of central Europe.

- Siler montanum subsp. apuanum F.Conti & Bartolucci – central Italy (Apuan Alps)
- Siler montanum subsp. corrasianum Bacch., Congiu, F.Conti & Bartolucci – Sardinia
- Siler montanum subsp. montanum – Alps, Pyrenees, and Iberian Mountains
- Siler montanum subsp. siculum – Sicily
- Siler montanum subsp. ogliastrinum Bacch., F.Conti & Bartolucci – Sardinia
- Siler montanum subsp. stabianum (Lacaita) F.Conti & Bartolucci – Italy (central and southern Apennines)

Alternately:

Ten taxa were recognized within the group, and among them three new subspecies were described: S. montanum subsp. apuanum, S. montanum subsp. corrasianum and S. montanum subsp. ogliastrinum. Furthermore, three new combinations were proposed: S. zernyi subsp. laeve, S. zernyi subsp. ochridanum and S. montanum subsp. stabianum. Six names were lectotypified: Laserpitium garganicum var. balcanicum, L. garganicum var. laeve, L. garganicum var. scabrum, L. siculum var. stabianum, L. siler var. ovalifolium and Ligusticum garganicum.

Occurrences were confirmed for Siler zernyi subsp. zernyi in Greece and S. zernyi subsp. laeve in North Macedonia. Occurrences were excluded for S. montanum subsp. garganicum in Greece and North Macedonia and S. montanum subsp. siculum in C and S Italy.

Map of range.

== Gallery ==
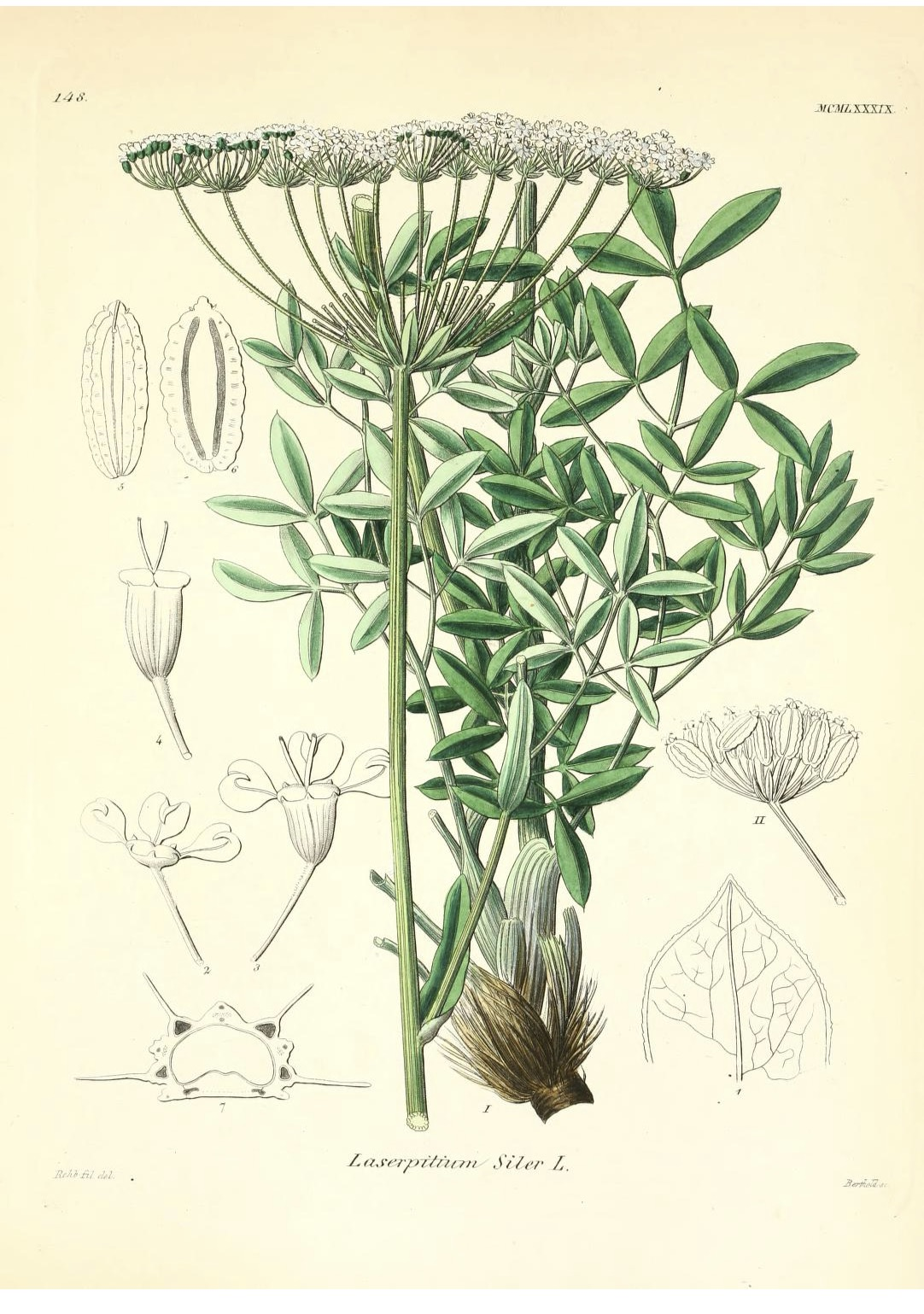
Botanical Illustration (1867)

== Volatile oils ==
Siler montanum contains terpenoid volatile oils. The colorless or blue essential oils are often rich in α/β-pinene, sabinene, limonene, terpinen-4-ol, αbisabolol, viridiflorol, and chamazulene The subsp. siculum contains (sabinene/perilla aldehyde/chamazulene); and the subsp. montanum,(I (E)-anethole, II sabinene, III limonene). Hydrodistillation of S. montanum aerial parts gave yields of 0.1–0.2% for subsp. siculum and 0.2–0.4% for subsp. montanum; most oils were blue-coloured due to the occurrence of chamazulene. GC-MS identifies 142 volatile components in five populations of S. montanum.

== Uses ==
The roots and seeds can be used as spices and have been used in flavouring gruit or beer.

Brewing additive before hops were common.
