= Williams Bros Brewing Co =

Microbrewery based in Alloa, Scotland

Heather Ale Ltd.
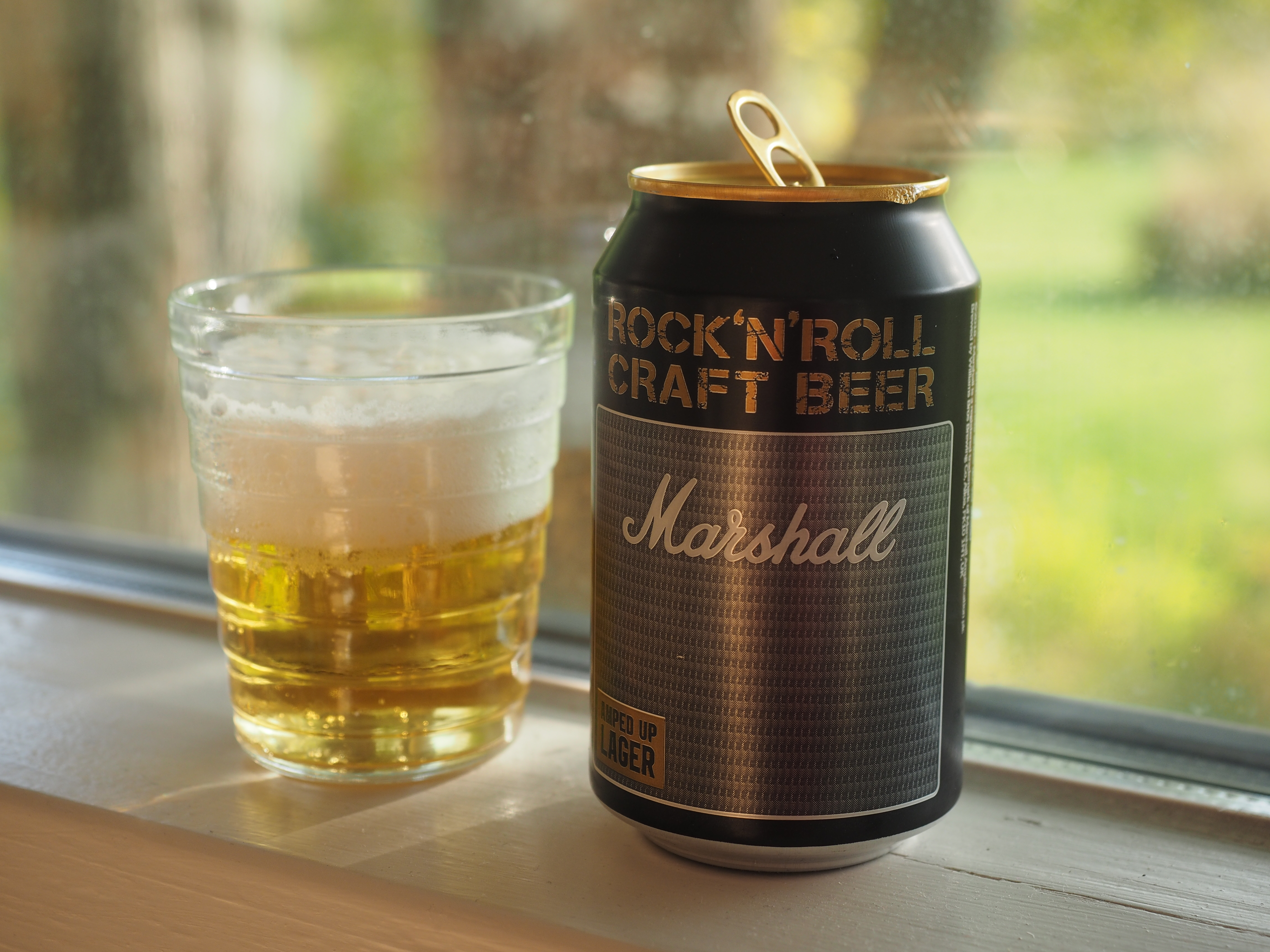
- Industry: Brewing
- Founded: 1983
- Headquarters: Alloa, Scotland, UK
- Key people: Bruce Williams, Scott Williams (co-founders)
- Website: www.williamsbrosbrew.com

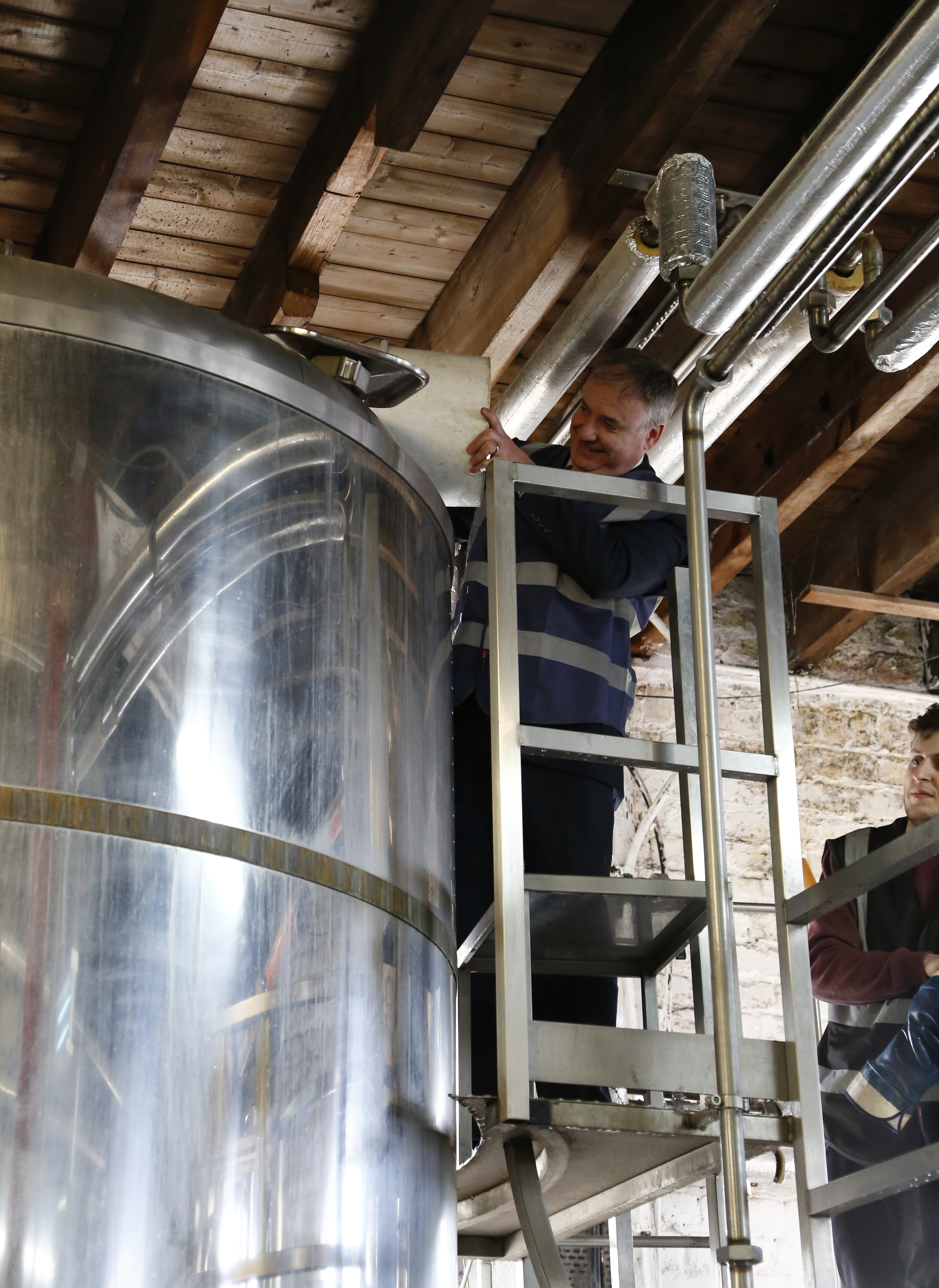

Williams Bros Brewing Company (legally Heather Ale Ltd.) is a Scottish family-owned microbrewery, founded and operated by brothers Bruce and Scott Williams. It is based in Alloa, Scotland.

== History ==
Williams Bros started brewing in 1988. Their first ale was inspired by a 17th-century Gaelic recipe for leann fraoich (heather ale). The heather ale is made using bog myrtle and heather flowers. The ale was produced in a tiny brewery in Taynuilt railway station, which could make no more than five barrels per batch, just enough to supply five pubs across Scotland. As demand grew, the recipe was taken to the old Maclay's Brewery in the Scottish brewing town of Alloa.

The company developed other historic ales, using natural Scottish produce such as elderberries, the shoots of Scots pine, seaweed and gooseberries. In 1998 the Heather Ale brewery moved to Craigmill, outside Strathaven in Lanarkshire. In 2004 the company moved again, to the Forth Brewery at Kelliebank, Alloa, where they are the last remaining brewery in the former Scottish brewing capital. Following the move, the company rebranded as Williams Bros Brewing Co., and continues to expand its range.

== See also ==
- Gruit
