= Rock Art Brewery =

Brewery in Vermont, US

Coordinates: 44.5582°N 72.6089°W

- Industry: Alcoholic beverage
- Founded: 1997
- Headquarters: Morrisville, Vermont; United States
- Products: Beer

Rock Art Brewery is an American brewery in Morrisville, Vermont. It began production in 1997 in the Johnson, Vermont basement of founders Matt and Renee Nadeau. In 2001 it moved to a larger facility in nearby Morrisville. After buying another property in Morrisville and building a new facility, Rock Art moved again in 2011. Its beers are currently only distributed in Vermont. In addition to bottles, cans and growlers, it offers 5 gallon logs and 13.2 gallon kegs.

In September, 2009, Hansen Natural brand Monster Energy sent a 'cease and desist' letter to Rock Art Brewery about its Vermonster series of microbrew beers, saying "VERMONSTER in connection with beer will undoubtedly create a likelihood and/or dilute the distinctive quality of Hansen's MONSTER marks." Hansen Beverage Co. has sought reimbursement for legal expenses and asked Rock Art Brewery to abandon a trademark application. Hansen has trademarks for “Monster” and “Monster Energy.”

Matt Nadeau, a co-owner of Rock Art Brewery said he plans to fight the litigation, even though his attorney said it could be costly. “Just don’t forget, it could get nasty,” Nadeau said his attorney advised.

Rock Art and Monster settled their dispute in October 2009. Nadeau credited social media and a grass-roots movement which pressured Hansen Beverage Co. Brooklyn Brewery has been using the name Monster since the late 1990s, prior to the creation of Monster Energy drinks.
