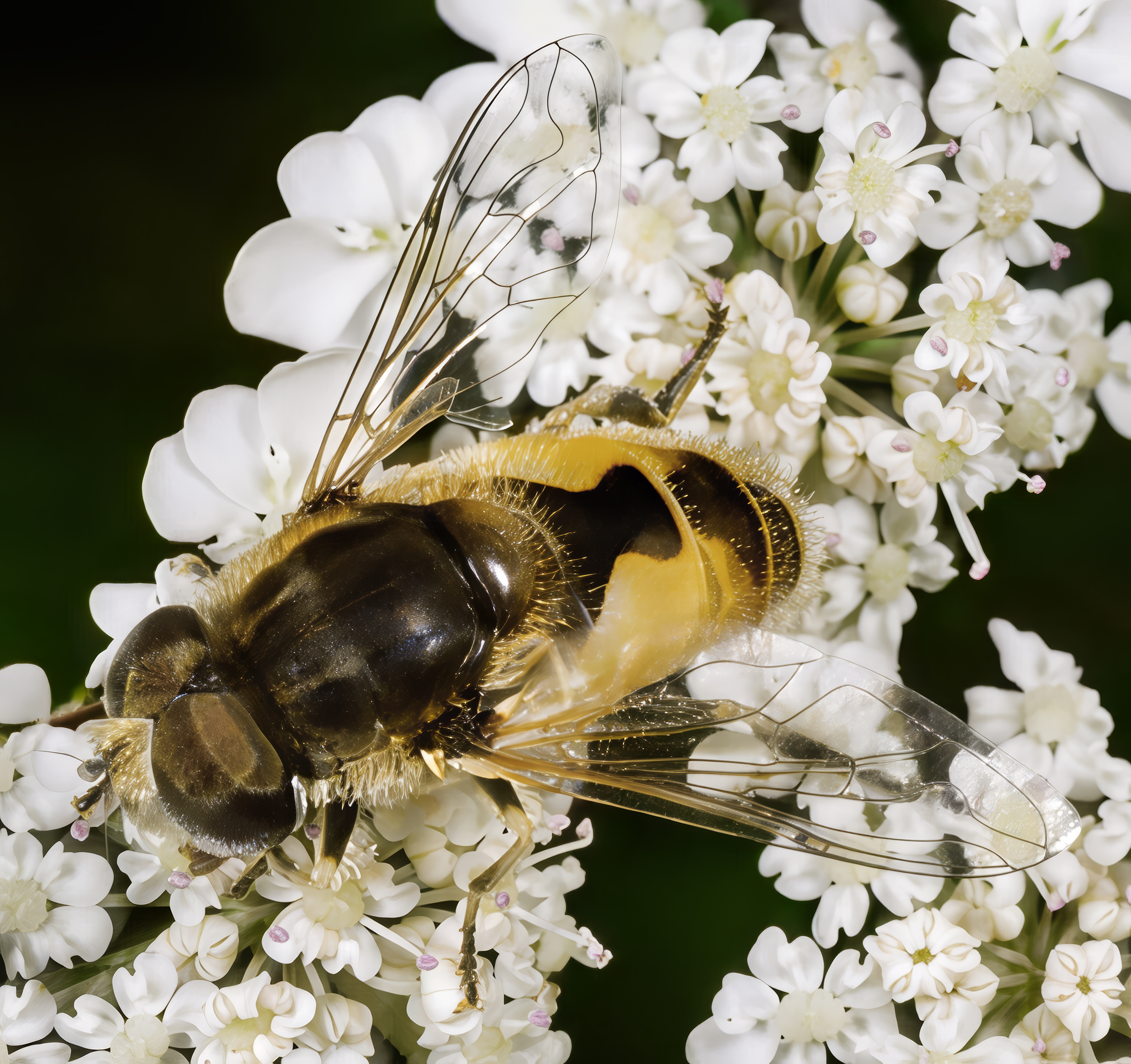
- Male
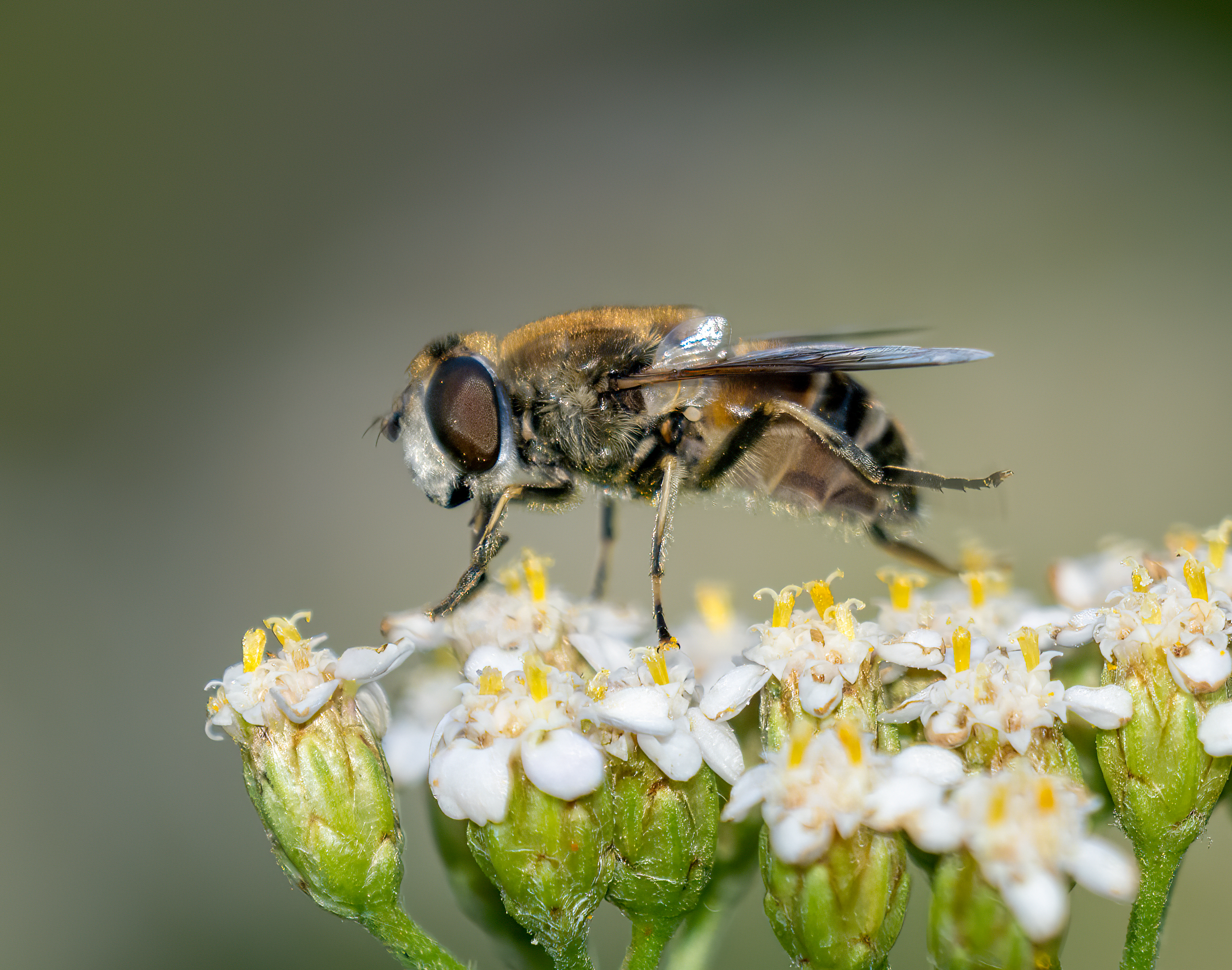
- Female

Scientific classification
- Kingdom: Animalia
- Phylum: Arthropoda
- Clade: Pancrustacea
- Class: Insecta
- Order: Diptera
- Family: Syrphidae
- Genus: Eristalis
- Species: E. arbustorum

Binomial name
- Eristalis arbustorum (Linnaeus, 1758)

Synonyms
- List: Eristalis lyra (Harris, 1776); Eristalis nemorum (Linnaeus, 1758); Eristalis paralleli (Harris, 1776); Eristalis parralleli (Harris, 1782); Musca arbustorum Linnaeus, 1758; Musca lyra Harris, 1776; Musca nemorum Linnaeus, 1758; Musca paralleli Harris, 1776; Musca parralleli Harris, 1782

= Eristalis arbustorum =

Species of insect

Eristalis arbustorum, the European drone fly, is an abundant Northern Hemisphere species of syrphid fly, originally officially described by Linnaeus in 1758 as Musca arbustorum. The name "drone fly" is related to its similar appearance to the drone of the honeybee. Hoverflies get their names from the ability to remain nearly motionless while in flight. The adults are also known as flower flies as they are commonly found on and around flowers from which they get both energy-giving nectar and protein rich pollen. The larvae are aquatic filter-feeders of the long-tailed type.

== Description ==
External images For terms see Morphology of Diptera
The wings are 7–10 mm long. At least, the basal half of the arista is plumose. The face is entirely pale dusted; there is a shining black median stripe in rubbed specimens. The hind femora are pale at their tips only. E. arbustorum resembles E. abusiva, but they are distinguished by the plumose arista, as well as a less projecting mouth-edge and shorter hairs overall. The top quarter of tibia 2 is black.

The male genitalia are figured by Hippa et al. (2001). The larva is figured by Hartley (1961).

== Biology ==
Eristalis arbustorum is found in a wide range of wetlands and in alluvial softwood forest, temperate coniferous forests, boreal forests, taiga, and montane tundra, as well as farmland, urban parks and gardens. It visits the flowers of a wide range of low-growing plants and shrubs. The larva is aquatic, occurring in shallow, nutrient rich standing water and in cow-dung, silage pits and compost heaps. The species is known to be migratory in Europe.

== Distribution ==
Eristalis arbustorum occurs throughout the Palaearctic, including North Africa, as well as in North India (Indomalayan realm). In North America, the species was introduced near Toronto around 1885 and is now ubiquitous throughout much of the United States and Canada. distribution map
