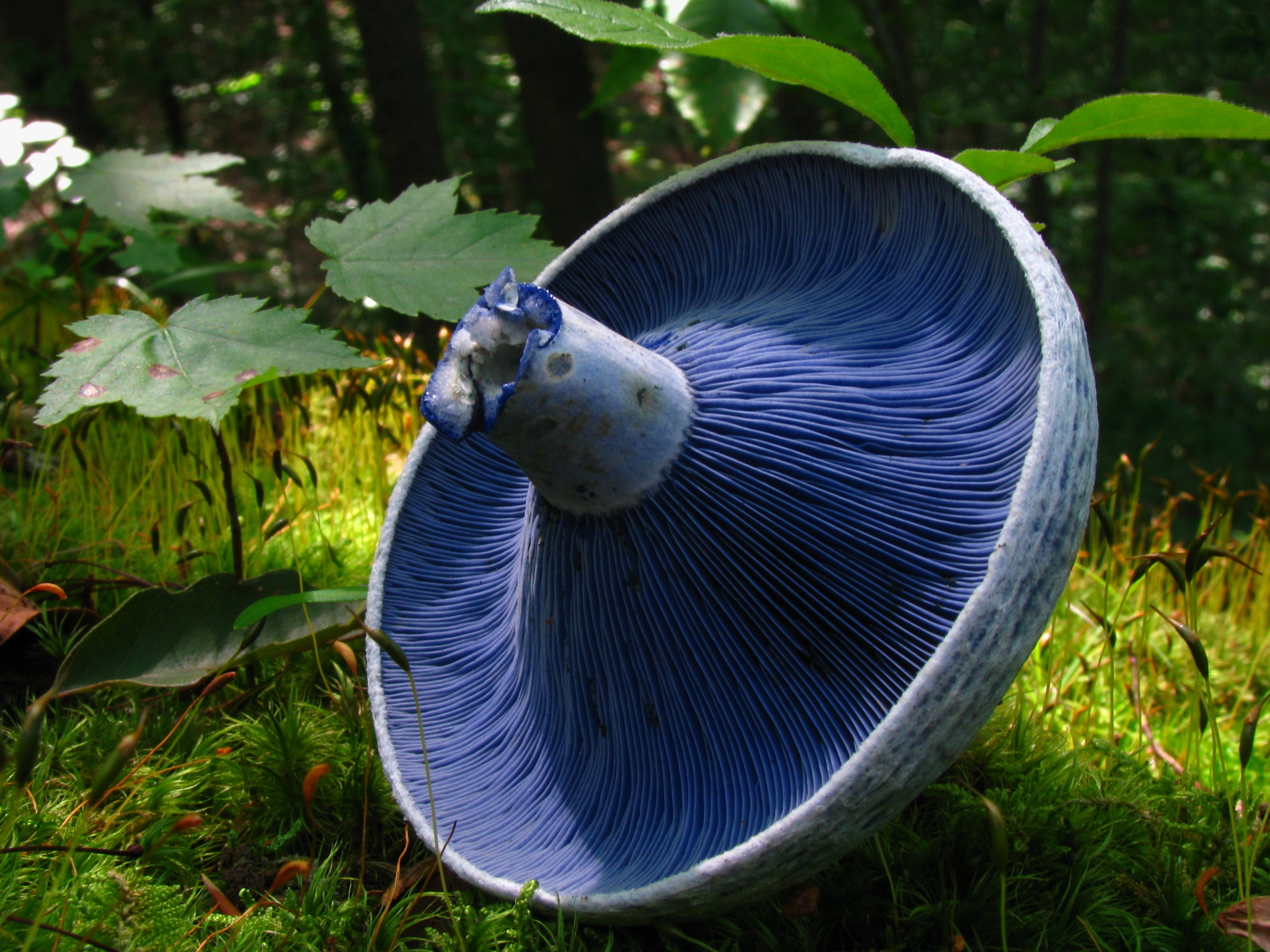
- The gills of L. indigo

Scientific classification
- Kingdom: Fungi
- Division: Basidiomycota
- Class: Agaricomycetes
- Order: Russulales
- Family: Russulaceae
- Genus: Lactarius
- Species: L. indigo

Binomial name
- Lactarius indigo (Schwein.) Fr. (1838)

Synonyms
- Agaricus indigo Schwein. (1822); Lactarius canadensis Winder (1871); Lactifluus indigo (Schwein.) Kuntze (1891)

= Lactarius indigo =

Edible fungus

Lactarius indigo
- Mycological characteristics
- Gills on hymenium
- Cap is depressed
- Hymenium is adnate or decurrent
- Stipe is bare
- Spore print is yellow
- Ecology is mycorrhizal
- Edibility is edible

Lactarius indigo, commonly known as the indigo milk cap, indigo milky, indigo lactarius, blue lactarius, or blue milk mushroom, is a species of agaric fungus in the family Russulaceae.

The fruit body color ranges from dark blue in fresh specimens to pale blue-gray in older ones. The "milk", or latex, that oozes when the mushroom tissue is cut or broken (a feature common to all members of the genus Lactarius) is also indigo blue, but slowly turns green upon exposure to air. The cap has a diameter of 4–15 cm (2–6 in), and the stem is 2–8 cm (3/4–3 1/8 in) tall and 1–2.5 cm (3/8–1 in) thick.

It is a widely distributed species, growing in the Americas and Eurasia. L. indigo grows on the ground in both deciduous and coniferous forests, where it forms mycorrhizal associations with a broad range of trees. It is an edible mushroom and is sold in rural markets in Mexico, Guatemala, and China.

== Taxonomy ==
Originally described in 1822 as Agaricus indigo by American mycologist Lewis David de Schweinitz, the species was later transferred to the genus Lactarius in 1838 by the Swede Elias Magnus Fries. German botanist Otto Kuntze called it Lactifluus indigo in his 1891 treatise Revisio Generum Plantarum, but the suggested name change was not adopted by others. Hesler and Smith, in their 1960 study of North American species of Lactarius, defined L. indigo as the type species of subsection Caerulei, a group characterized by blue latex and a sticky, blue cap. In 1979, they revised their opinions on the organization of subdivisions in the genus Lactarius, and instead placed L. indigo in subgenus Lactarius based on the color of latex and the subsequent color changes observed after exposure to air. As they explained:

The gradual development of blue to violet pigmentation as one progresses from species to species is an interesting phenomenon deserving further study. The climax is reached in L. indigo which is blue throughout. L. chelidonium and its variety chelidonioides, L. paradoxus, and L. hemicyaneus may be considered as mileposts along the road to L. indigo.

The specific epithet indigo is derived from the Latin word meaning 'indigo blue'. Its names in the English vernacular include the "indigo milk cap", the "indigo Lactarius", the "blue milk mushroom", and the "blue Lactarius". In central Mexico, it is known as añil, azul, hongo azul, zuin, and zuine; it is also called quexque (meaning 'blue') in Veracruz and Puebla.

== Description ==
Like many other mushrooms, L. indigo develops from a nodule that forms within the underground mycelium, a mass of threadlike fungal cells called hyphae that make up the bulk of the organism. Under appropriate environmental conditions of temperature, humidity, and nutrient availability, the visible reproductive structures (fruit bodies) are formed. The cap of the fruit body, measuring between 4–15 cm (1 1/2–6 in) in diameter, is initially convex and later develops a central depression; in age it becomes even more deeply depressed, becoming somewhat funnel-shaped as the edge of the cap lifts upward. The margin of the cap is rolled inwards when young, but unrolls and elevates as it matures. The cap surface is indigo blue when fresh, but fades to a paler grayish- or silvery-blue, sometimes with greenish splotches. It is often zonate: marked with concentric lines that form alternating pale and darker zones, and the cap may have dark blue spots, especially towards the edge. Young caps are sticky to the touch.

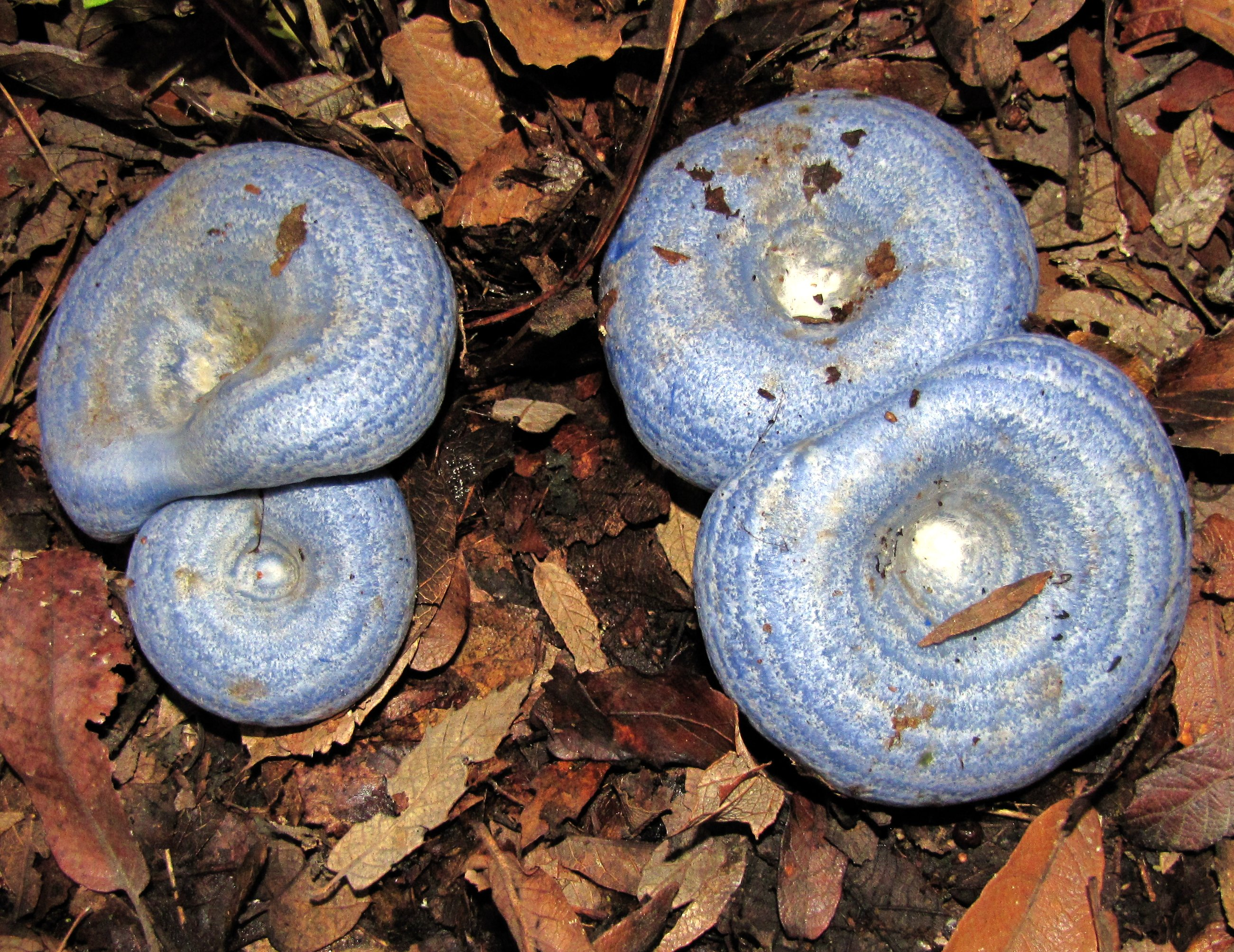
Tops of caps found in Guadalajara, Mexico

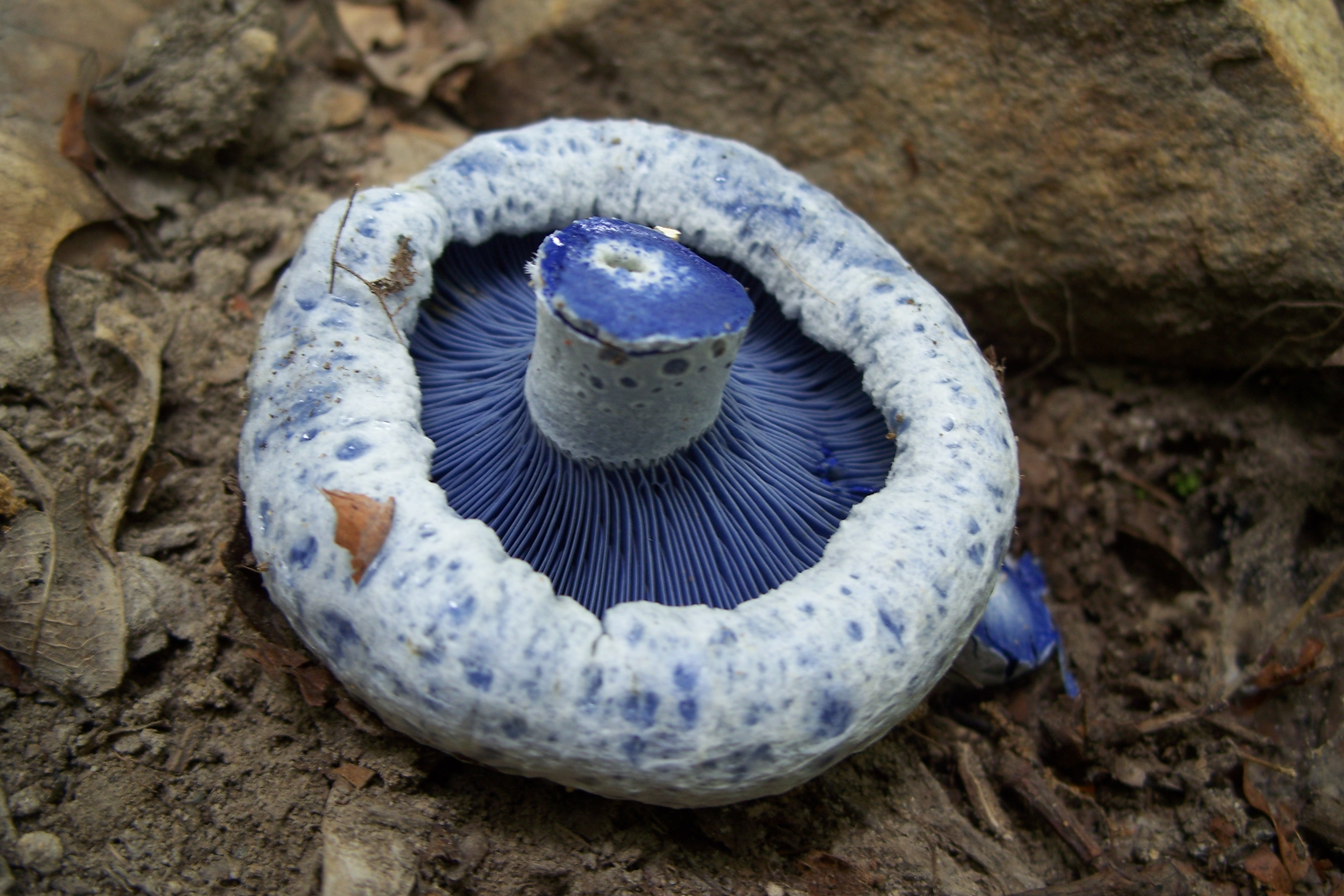
The cap margin is rolled inwards in young specimens.

The flesh is pallid to bluish in color, slowly turning greenish after being exposed to air; its taste is mild to slightly acrid. The flesh of the entire mushroom is brittle, and the stem, if bent sufficiently, will snap open cleanly. The latex exuded from injured tissue is indigo blue, and stains the wounded tissue greenish; like the flesh, the latex has a mild taste. Lactarius indigo is noted for not producing as much latex as other Lactarius species, and older specimens in particular may be too dried out to produce any latex.

The gills of the mushroom range from adnate (squarely attached to the stem) to slightly decurrent (running down the length of the stem), and crowded close together. Their color is an indigo blue, becoming paler with age or staining green with damage. The stem is 2–8 cm (3/4–3 1/8 in) tall by 1–2.5 cm (3/8–1 in) thick, and the same diameter throughout or sometimes narrowed at base. Its color is indigo blue to silvery- or grayish blue. The interior of the stem is solid and firm initially, but develops a hollow with age. Like the cap, it is initially sticky or slimy to the touch when young, but soon dries out. Its attachment to the cap is usually in a central position, although it may also be off-center. Fruit bodies of L. indigo have no distinguishable odor.

L. indigo var. diminutivus (the "smaller indigo milk cap") is a smaller variant of the mushroom, with a cap diameter between 3–7 cm (1 1/8–2 3/4 in), and a stem 1.5–4 cm (5/8–1 5/8 in) long and 0.3–1 cm (1/8–3/8 in) thick. It is often seen in Virginia. Hesler and Smith, who first described the variant based on specimens found in Brazoria County, Texas, described its typical habitat as "along [the] sides of a muddy ditch under grasses and weeds, [with] loblolly pine nearby".

=== Microscopic features ===
When viewed in mass, as in a spore print, the spores appear cream to yellow colored. Viewed with a light microscope, the spores are translucent (hyaline), elliptical to nearly spherical in shape, with amyloid warts, and have dimensions of 7–9 by 5.5–7.5 μm. Scanning electron microscopy reveals reticulations on the spore surface. The hymenium is the spore-producing tissue layer of the fruit body, and consists of hyphae that extend into the gills and terminate as end cells. Various cell types can be observed in the hymenium, and the cells have microscopic characteristics that may be used to help identify or distinguish species in cases where the macroscopic characters may be ambiguous. The spore-bearing cells, the basidia, are four-spored and measure 37–45 μm long by 8–10 μm wide at the thickest point. Cystidia are terminal cells of hyphae in the hymenium which do not produce spores, and function in aiding spore dispersal, and maintaining favorable humidity around developing spores. The pleurocystidia are cystidia that are found on the face of a gill; they are 40–56 by 6.4–8 μm, roughly spindle-shaped, and have a constricted apex. The cheilocystidia—located on the edge of a gill—are abundant, and are 40.0–45.6 by 5.6–7.2 μm.

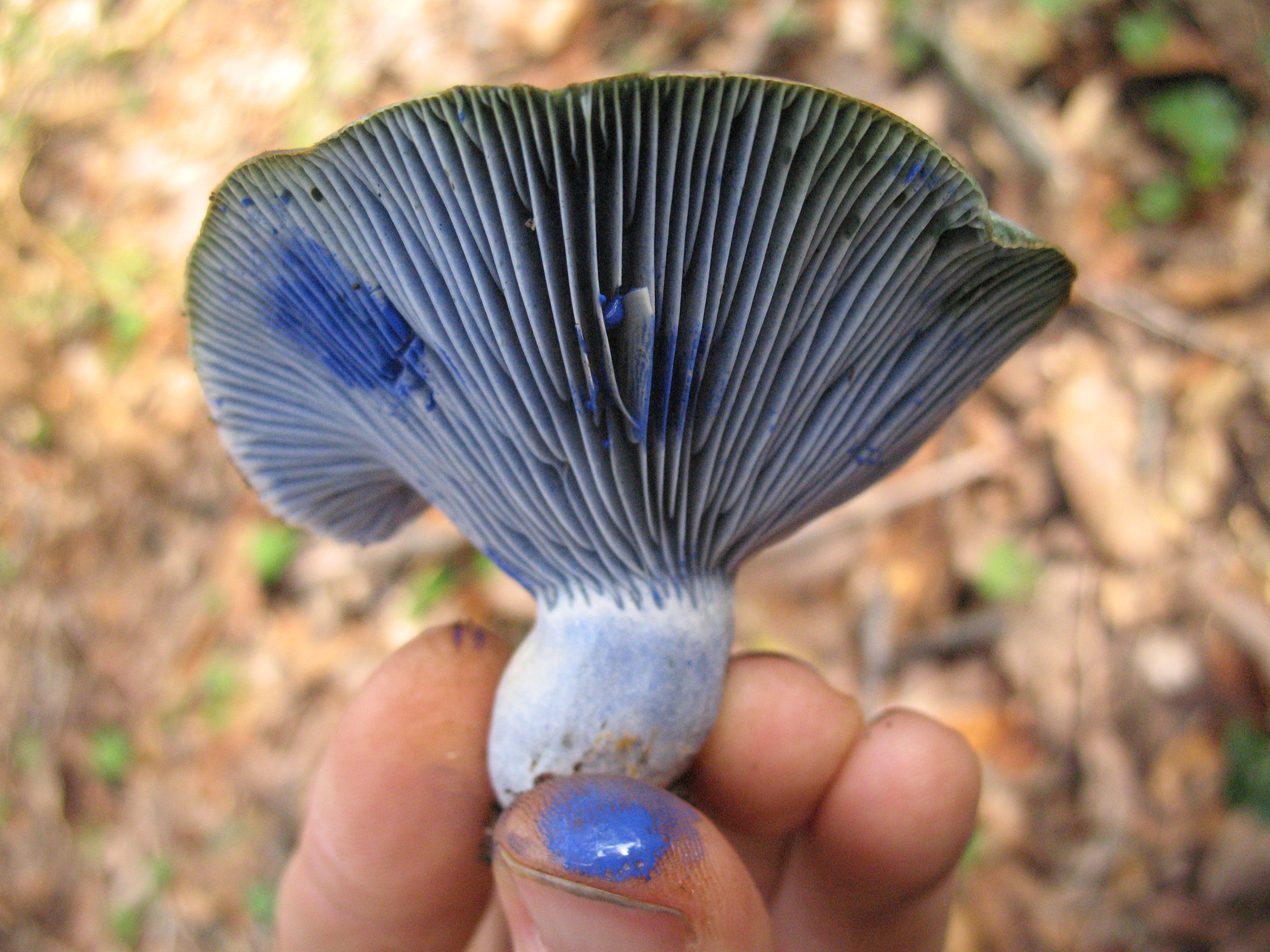
The "milk", or latex, is indigo blue.

=== Chemical composition ===
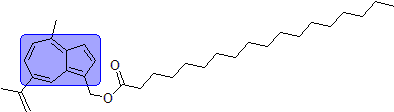
(7-Isopropenyl-4-methylazulen-1-yl)methyl stearate, the blue lipophilic azulene pigment from L. indigo. The part of the molecule responsible for its color (chromophore) is highlighted in blue.

Chemical analysis of Mexican specimens has shown L. indigo to contain moisture at 951 mg/g of mushroom, fat at 4.3 mg/g, protein at 13.4 mg/g, and dietary fiber at 18.7 mg/g, much higher in comparison to the common button mushroom, which contains 6.6 mg/g. Compared to three other wild edible mushroom species also tested in the study (Amanita rubescens, Boletus frostii, and Ramaria flava), L. indigo contained the highest saturated fatty acids content, including stearic acid with 32.1 mg/g—slightly over half of the total free fatty acid content.

The blue color of L. indigo is due to (7-isopropenyl-4-methylazulen-1-yl)methyl stearate, an organic derivative of azulene, which is biosynthesised from a sesquiterpene very similar to matricin, the precursor for chamazulene. It is unique to this species, but similar to a compound found in L. deliciosus.

=== Similar species ===
The characteristic blue color of the fruiting body and the latex make this species easily recognizable. Other Lactarius species with some blue color include the "silver-blue milky" (L. paradoxus), found in eastern North America, which has a grayish-blue cap when young, but it has reddish-brown to purple-brown latex and gills. L. chelidonium has a yellowish to dingy yellow-brown to bluish-gray cap and yellowish to brown latex. L. quieticolor has blue-colored flesh in the cap and orange to red-orange flesh in the base of the stem. Although the blue discoloration of L. indigo is thought to be rare in the genus Lactarius, in 2007 five new species were reported from Peninsular Malaysia with bluing latex or flesh, including L. cyanescens, L. lazulinus, L. mirabilis, and two species still unnamed.

== Distribution, habitat, and ecology ==
Lactarius indigo is distributed throughout southern and eastern North America but is most common along the Gulf Coast, Mexico, and Guatemala. Its frequency of appearance in the Appalachian Mountains of the United States has been described as "occasional to locally common". Mycologist David Arora notes that in the U.S., the species is found with ponderosa pine in Arizona, but is absent in California's ponderosa pine forests. It is also found in Mexico, Guatemala, Costa Rica (in forests dominated by oak), and as far south as the Humboldt oak cloud forests of Colombia. In Europe, it has so far only been found in southern France. It has also been collected from China and India.

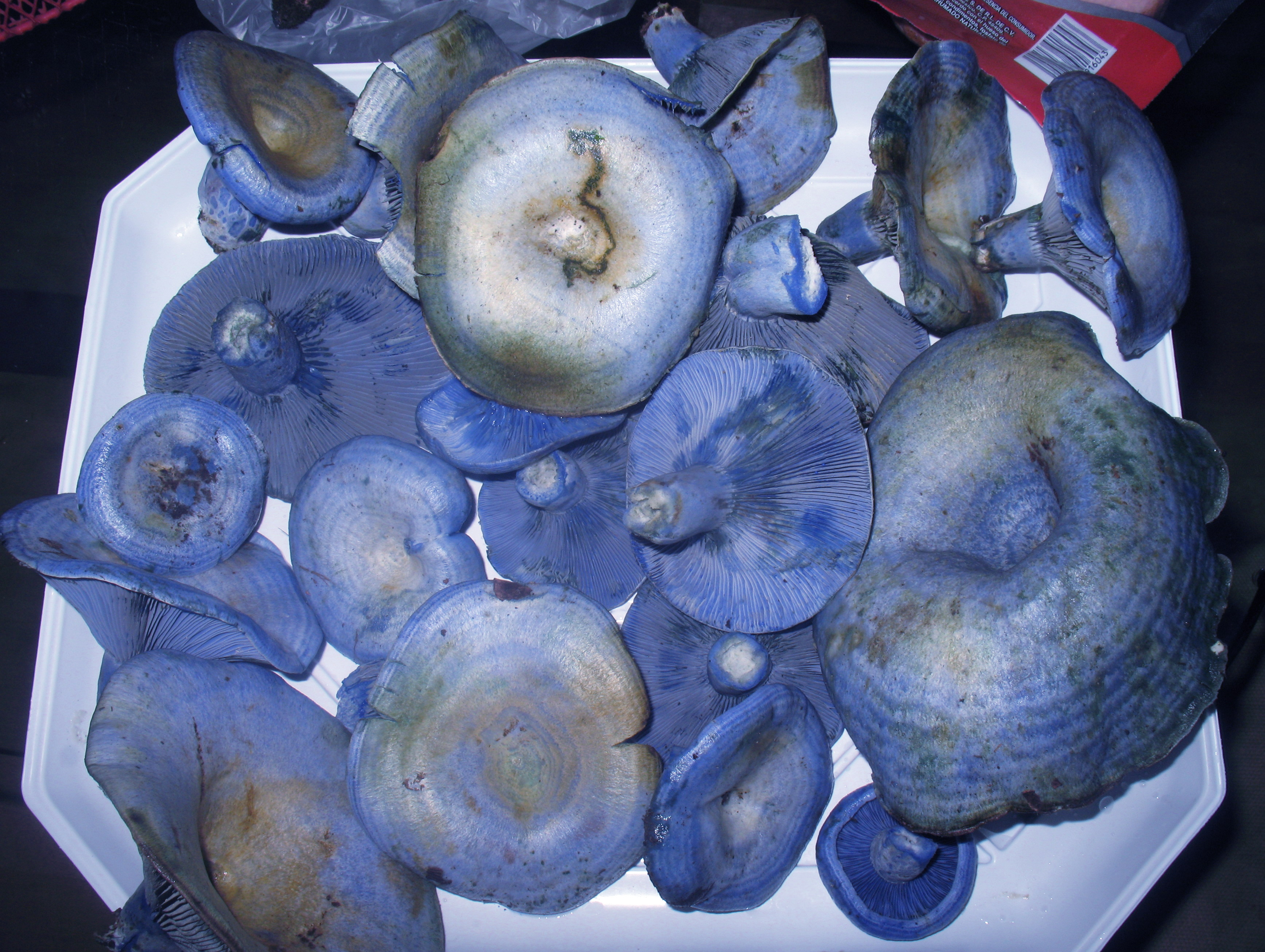
A collection of L. indigo found in Jalisco, Mexico

A study on the seasonal appearance of fruiting bodies in the subtropical forests of Xalapa, Mexico, found that maximal production of L. indigo coincided with the rainy season between June and September. It is a mycorrhizal fungus, and as such, establishes a mutualistic relationship with the roots of certain trees ("hosts"), in which the fungi exchange minerals and amino acids extracted from the soil for fixed carbon from the host. The subterranean hyphae of the fungus grow a sheath of tissue around the rootlets of a broad range of tree species, forming so-called ectomycorrhizae—an intimate association that is especially beneficial to the host, as the fungus produces enzymes that mineralize organic compounds and facilitate the transfer of nutrients to the tree.

Reflecting their close relationships with trees, the fruit bodies of L. indigo are typically found growing on the ground, scattered or in groups, in both deciduous and coniferous forests. They are also commonly found in floodplain areas that have been recently submerged. In Mexico, associations have been noted with Mexican alder, American Hornbeam, American Hophornbeam, and Liquidambar macrophylla, while in Guatemala the mushroom associates with smooth-bark Mexican pine and other pine and oak species. In Costa Rica, the species forms associations with several native oaks of the genus Quercus. Under controlled laboratory conditions, L. indigo was shown to be able to form ectomycorrhizal associations with the neotropical pine species Mexican white pine, Hartweg's pine, Mexican yellow pine, smooth-bark Mexican pine, and the Eurasian pines Aleppo pine, European black pine, maritime pine, and Scots pine.

== Uses ==
Although L. indigo is a well-known edible species, opinions vary on its desirability. For example, American mycologist David Arora considers it a "superior edible", while a field guide on Kansas fungi rates it as "mediocre in quality". It may have a slightly bitter, or peppery taste, and has a coarse, grainy texture. The firm flesh is best prepared by cutting the mushroom in thin slices. The blue color disappears with cooking, and the mushroom becomes grayish. Because of the granular texture of the flesh, it does not lend itself well to drying. Specimens producing copious quantities of milk may be used to add color to marinades.

In Mexico, individuals harvest the wild mushrooms for sale at farmers' markets, typically from June to November; they are considered a "second class" species for consumption. L. indigo is also sold in Guatemalan markets from May to October. It is one of 13 Lactarius species sold at rural markets in Yunnan in southwestern China.

== See also ==
- List of Lactarius species
