= C15H18 =

The molecular formula C_{15}H_{18} (molar mass: 198.30 g/mol) may refer to:

- Cadalene, or cadalin
- Guaiazulene, also known as azulon or 1,4-dimethyl-7-isopropylazulene
- Vetivazulene
