= Bisabolol =

α-(−)-Bisabolol
- α-(−)-Bisabolol

Names
- Preferred IUPAC name (2S)-6-Methyl-2-[(1S)-4-methylcyclohex-3-en-1-yl]hept-5-en-2-ol
- Other names Levomenol

Identifiers
| CAS Number | (-): 23089-26-1; (±): 515-69-5 |
| 3D model (JSmol) | (-): Interactive image |
| Beilstein Reference | 5733954 |
| ChEMBL | (-): ChEMBL1096927 |
| ChemSpider | (-): 390796 |
| ECHA InfoCard | 100.041.279 |
| PubChem CID | (-): 442343; (±): 10586 |
| UNII | (-): 24WE03BX2T; (±): 36HQN158VC |
| CompTox Dashboard (EPA) | (-): DTXSID4042094 |
- InChI: InChI=1S/C15H26O/c1-12(2)6-5-11-15(4,16)14-9-7-13(3)8-10-14/h6-7,14,16H,5,8-11H2,1-4H3 Key: RGZSQWQPBWRIAQ-UHFFFAOYSA-N; (-): InChI=1/C15H26O/c1-12(2)6-5-11-15(4,16)14-9-7-13(3)8-10-14/h6-7,14,16H,5,8-11H2,1-4H3/t14-,15+/m1/s1 Key: RGZSQWQPBWRIAQ-CABCVRREBV; (±): InChI=1/C15H26O/c1-12(2)6-5-11-15(4,16)14-9-7-13(3)8-10-14/h6-7,14,16H,5,8-11H2,1-4H3/t14-,15+/m1/s1 Key: RGZSQWQPBWRIAQ-CABCVRREBV
- SMILES: (-): O[C@@](C)(CC\C=C(/C)C)[C@@H]1C/C=C(/C)CC1

Properties
| Chemical formula | C_{15}H_{26}O |
| Molar mass | 222.372 g·mol^{−1} |
| Density | 0.92 g cm^{−3} |
| Boiling point | 153 °C (307 °F; 426 K) at 12 mmHg |
- Except where otherwise noted, data are given for materials in their standard state (at 25 °C [77 °F], 100 kPa). Infobox references

Bisabolol, or more formally α-(−)-bisabolol or also known as levomenol, is a natural monocyclic sesquiterpene alcohol. It is a colorless viscous oil that is the primary constituent of the essential oil from German chamomile (Matricaria recutita) and Myoporum crassifolium. High concentrations of bisabolol can also be found in certain medicinal cannabis cultivars. It is poorly soluble in water and glycerine, but soluble in ethanol. The enantiomer, α-(+)-bisabolol, is also found naturally but is rare. Synthetic bisabolol is usually a racemic mixture of the two, α-(±)-bisabolol. It is the terpenoid responsible for the distinctive aroma of chamomile flowers, and when isolated, its scent has also been likened to apples, sugar and honey.

Bisabolol has a weak sweet floral aroma described as fruity, nutty, and coconut, and is used in various fragrances. It has also been used for hundreds of years in cosmetics because of its skin healing properties including reducing wrinkles, skin toughness and repairing sun-damaged skin, and more recently it has been compounded with tretinoin as a topical treatment for acne. Bisabolol is known to have anti-irritant, anti-inflammatory, and anti-microbial properties. Bisabolol is also demonstrated to enhance the percutaneous absorption of certain molecules and has found use as a penetration enhancer: an agent used in topical formulations, increasing the substances propensity for absorption beneath the skin.

The structurally related compound, β-bisabolol (15352-77-9 ), differs in the positioning of the tertiary alcohol functional group.

(−)-α-Bisabolol

β-Bisabolol
