= Matricin =

Names
- IUPAC name (11S)-4-Hydroxy-12-oxo-6α,12-epoxyguaia-1(10),2-dien-8α-yl acetate
- Systematic IUPAC name (3S,3aR,4S,9R,9aS,9bS)-9-Hydroxy-3,6,9-trimethyl-2-oxo-2,3,3a,4,5,9,9a,9b-octahydroazuleno[4,5-b]furan-4-yl acetate
- Other names Proazulene; Prochamazulene

Identifiers
CAS Number	29041-35-8
3D model (JSmol)	Interactive image
ChemSpider	83299
ECHA InfoCard	100.044.881
EC Number	249-384-3
PubChem CID	3483298
UNII	O034C3549S
CompTox Dashboard (EPA)	DTXSID50951639
- InChI: InChI=1S/C17H22O5/c1-8-7-12(21-10(3)18)13-9(2)16(19)22-15(13)14-11(8)5-6-17(14,4)20/h5-6,9,12-15,20H,7H2,1-4H3/t9-,12-,13+,14-,15-,17+/m0/s1 Key: SYTRJRUSWMMZLV-VQGWEXQJSA-N
- SMILES: C[C@H]1[C@@H]2[C@H](CC(=C3C=C[C@@]([C@@H]3[C@H]2OC1=O)(C)O)C)OC(=O)C

Properties
Chemical formula	C_{17}H_{22}O_{5}
Molar mass	306.358 g·mol^{−1}
- Except where otherwise noted, data are given for materials in their standard state (at 25 °C [77 °F], 100 kPa). Infobox references

Matricin is a colorless sesquiterpene found in the flowers of chamomille (Matricaria chamomilla). Steam distillation during the processing of chamomille can convert matricin to chamazulene, a blue-violet derivative of azulene. Oral ingestion of matricin results in chamazulene being found in blood plasma and artificial gastric fluid is able to convert matricin to chamazulene.

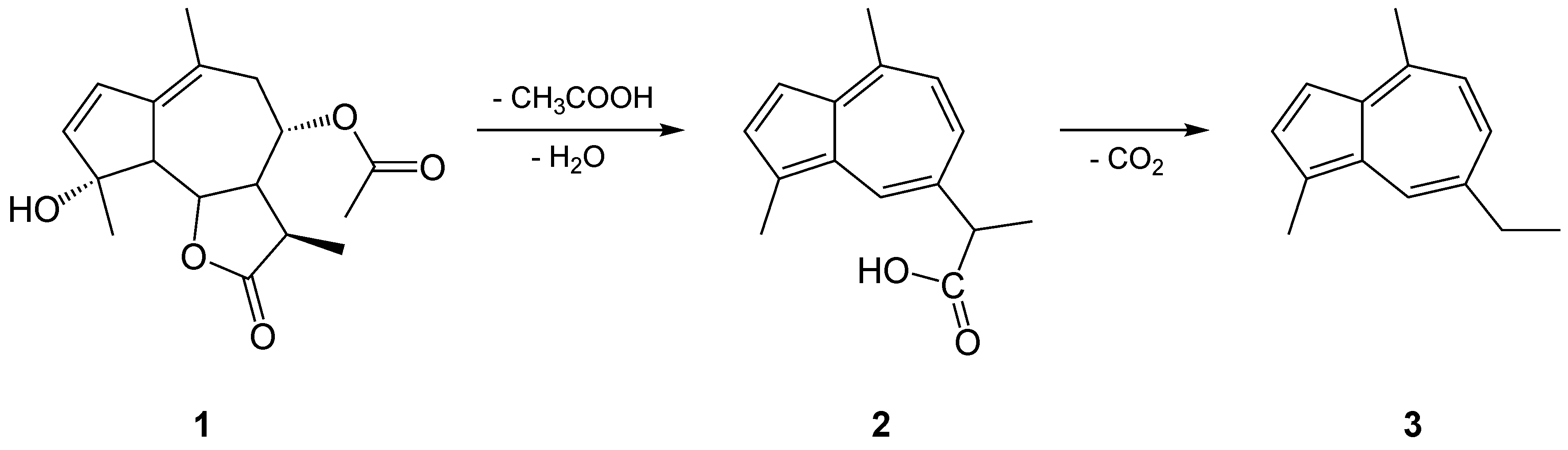
Degradation of matricin (1) to chamazulene (3) via chamazulene carboxylic acid (2).
