= Myoporum tenuifolium =

Scientific classification
- Kingdom: Plantae
- Clade: Tracheophytes
- Clade: Angiosperms
- Clade: Eudicots
- Clade: Asterids
- Order: Lamiales
- Family: Scrophulariaceae
- Genus: Myoporum
- Species: M. tenuifolium

Binomial name
- Myoporum tenuifolium G.Forst

Synonyms
- Citharexylum perforatum G.Forst.; Citharexylum tenuifolium G.Forst.; Myoporum acuminatum R.Br.

Species of flowering plant

Myoporum tenuifolium is a plant in the figwort family, Scrophulariaceae and it is endemic to New Caledonia and the Loyalty Islands. It can be distinguished from Myoporum crassifolium, (the only other member of the genus to occur in New Caledonia) by its very thin leaves and its glabrous flowers.

== Description ==
Myoporum tenuifolium is an erect shrub usually growing to a height of 1–2 m (3 ft 3 in – 6 ft 7 in) with flattened branches. Its leaves are arranged alternately, usually 50–70 mm (2.0–2.8 in) long and 9–16 mm (0.35–0.63 in) wide on a petiole 3–10 mm (0.12–0.39 in) long. They are unusually thin and membranous, elliptic in shape and have a distinct mid-vein on the lower surface.

The flowers are borne in leaf axils singly or in groups of up to four on a flattened pedicel 6–12.5 mm (0.24–0.49 in) long. The flowers have five triangular sepals and five petals joined at their bases to form a bell-shaped tube. The petals are white and the tube is 2–4.5 mm (0.079–0.177 in) long with the lobes slightly shorter than the tube. The tube and its lobes are glabrous and there are four stamens that extend slightly beyond it. The fruit is a reddish to brown, oval drupe 3.5–7 mm (0.14–0.28 in) long.

== Taxonomy and naming ==
Myoporum tenuifolium was first formally described in 1786 by Georg Forster in Florulae Insularum Australium Prodromus in 1810. The specific epithet (tenuifolium) is derived from the Latin words tenuis meaning "slender" and folium, "leaf".

== Distribution and habitat ==
Myoporum tenuifolium is found on Grande Terre, the main island of New Caledonia and on Maré Island and Ouvéa in the Loyalty Island group. It grows in scrub and forest, often on steep hillsides.

== Ecology ==
This species has become naturalised on the southern coast of South Africa.

== Use in horticulture ==
Myoporum tenuifolium is a common garden plant in eastern Spain.
