= Chamazulene =

Names
- Preferred IUPAC name 7-Ethyl-1,4-dimethylazulene
- Other names 1,4-Dimethyl-7-ethylazulene; Ba 2784; Camazulene; Chamazulen; Dimethulen; Dimethulene

Identifiers
CAS Number	529-05-5
3D model (JSmol)	Interactive image
ChemSpider	10268
ECHA InfoCard	100.007.682
PubChem CID	10719
UNII	Z439UH6E5F
CompTox Dashboard (EPA)	DTXSID70200939
- InChI: InChI=1S/C14H16/c1-4-12-7-5-10(2)13-8-6-11(3)14(13)9-12/h5-9H,4H2,1-3H3 Key: GXGJIOMUZAGVEH-UHFFFAOYSA-N; InChI=1/C14H16/c1-4-12-7-5-10(2)13-8-6-11(3)14(13)9-12/h5-9H,4H2,1-3H3 Key: GXGJIOMUZAGVEH-UHFFFAOYAM
- SMILES: c1(ccc(c2ccc(c2c1)C)C)CC

Properties
Chemical formula	C_{14}H_{16}
Molar mass	184.282 g·mol^{−1}
Appearance	Blue oil
Density	0.9883 (at 20 °C)
Boiling point	161 °C (322 °F; 434 K) (at 12 mmHg)

Hazards
- Lethal dose or concentration (LD, LC)
LD_{50} (median dose)	3 g/kg (i.m., mouse)
- Except where otherwise noted, data are given for materials in their standard state (at 25 °C [77 °F], 100 kPa). Infobox references

Chamazulene is an aromatic chemical compound with the molecular formula C_{14}H_{16} found in a variety of plants including in chamomile (Matricaria chamomilla), wormwood (Artemisia absinthium), and yarrow (Achillea millefolium). It is a blue-violet derivative of azulene formed from sesquiterpene matricin after the loss of acetate, water and carbon dioxide during the steam distillation of chamomile blossoms. Oral ingestion of matricin results in chamazulene being found in blood plasma and artificial gastric fluid is able to convert matricin to chamazulene.

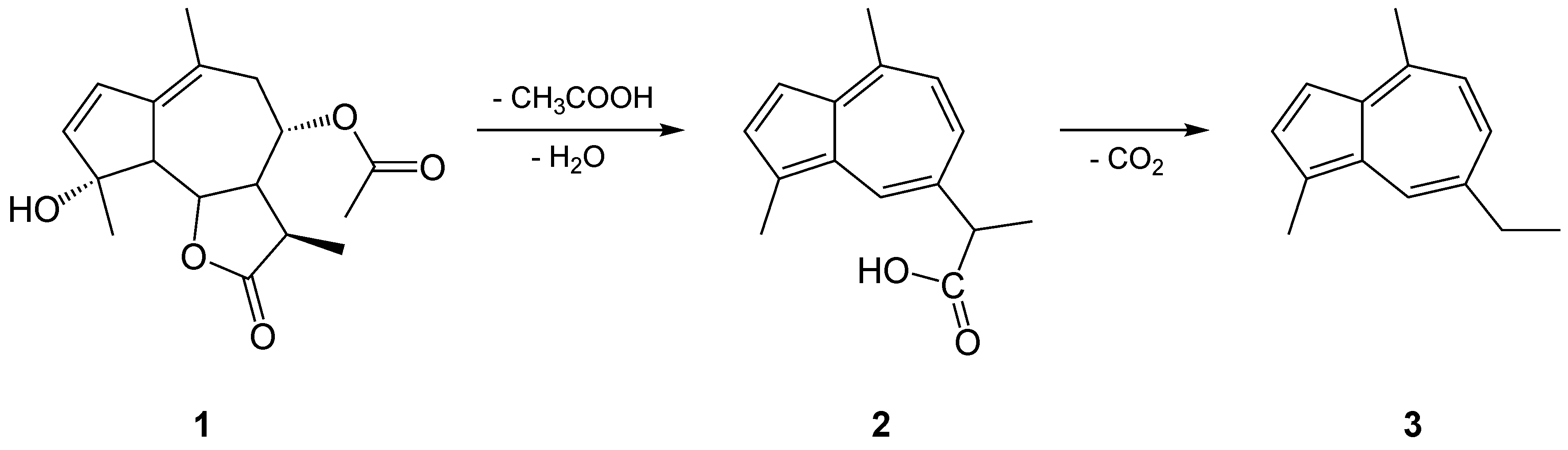
Degradation of matricin (1) to chamazulene (3) via chamazulene carboxylic acid (2).

Chamazulene has anti-inflammatory properties in vivo and inhibits the CYP1A2 enzyme, but not CYP1A1.
