= Guaiazulene =

- Guaiazulene

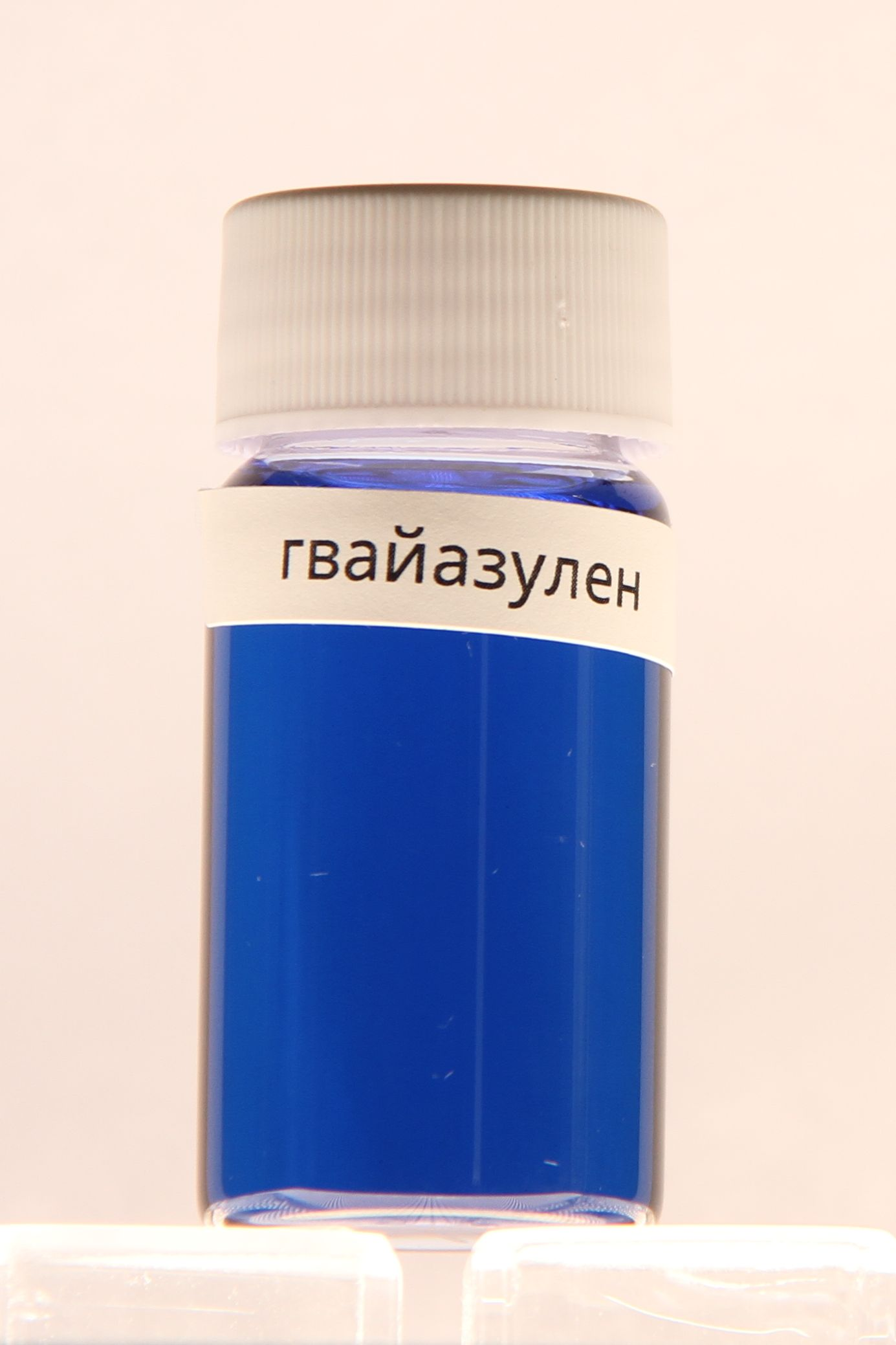
- Guaiazulene solution Solution in DMSO with hydroquinone added as an antioxidant

Names
- Preferred IUPAC name 1,4-Dimethyl-7-(propan-2-yl)azulene

Identifiers
CAS Number	489-84-9
3D model (JSmol)	Interactive image
Beilstein Reference	1365001
ChEBI	CHEBI:5550
ChEMBL	ChEMBL1408759
ChemSpider	3395
DrugBank	DB13329
ECHA InfoCard	100.007.002
EC Number	207-701-2
KEGG	D01037
PubChem CID	3515
UNII	2OZ1K9JKQC
CompTox Dashboard (EPA)	DTXSID7045996
- InChI: InChI=1S/C15H18/c1-10(2)13-7-5-11(3)14-8-6-12(4)15(14)9-13/h5-10H,1-4H3 Key: FWKQNCXZGNBPFD-UHFFFAOYSA-N; InChI=1/C15H18/c1-10(2)13-7-5-11(3)14-8-6-12(4)15(14)9-13/h5-10H,1-4H3 Key: FWKQNCXZGNBPFD-UHFFFAOYAG
- SMILES: CC1=C2C=CC(=C2C=C(C=C1)C(C)C)C

Properties
Chemical formula	C_{15}H_{18}
Molar mass	198.309 g·mol^{−1}
Density	0.976 g/cm^{3}
Melting point	31 to 33 °C (88 to 91 °F; 304 to 306 K)
Boiling point	153 °C (307 °F; 426 K) (7 mm Hg)

Pharmacology
ATC code	S01XA01 (WHO)
- Except where otherwise noted, data are given for materials in their standard state (at 25 °C [77 °F], 100 kPa). verify (what is ?) Infobox references

Guaiazulene, also azulon or 1,4-dimethyl-7-isopropylazulene, is a dark blue crystalline hydrocarbon. A derivative of azulene, guaiazulene is a bicyclic sesquiterpene that is a constituent of some essential oils, mainly oil of guaiac and chamomile oil, which also serve as its commercial sources. Various soft corals also contain guaiazulene as a principal pigment. Its low melting point makes guaiazulene difficult to handle, in contrast to the crystalline nature of the parent azulene. The electronic structure (and colors) of guaiazulene and azulene are very similar.

== Applications ==
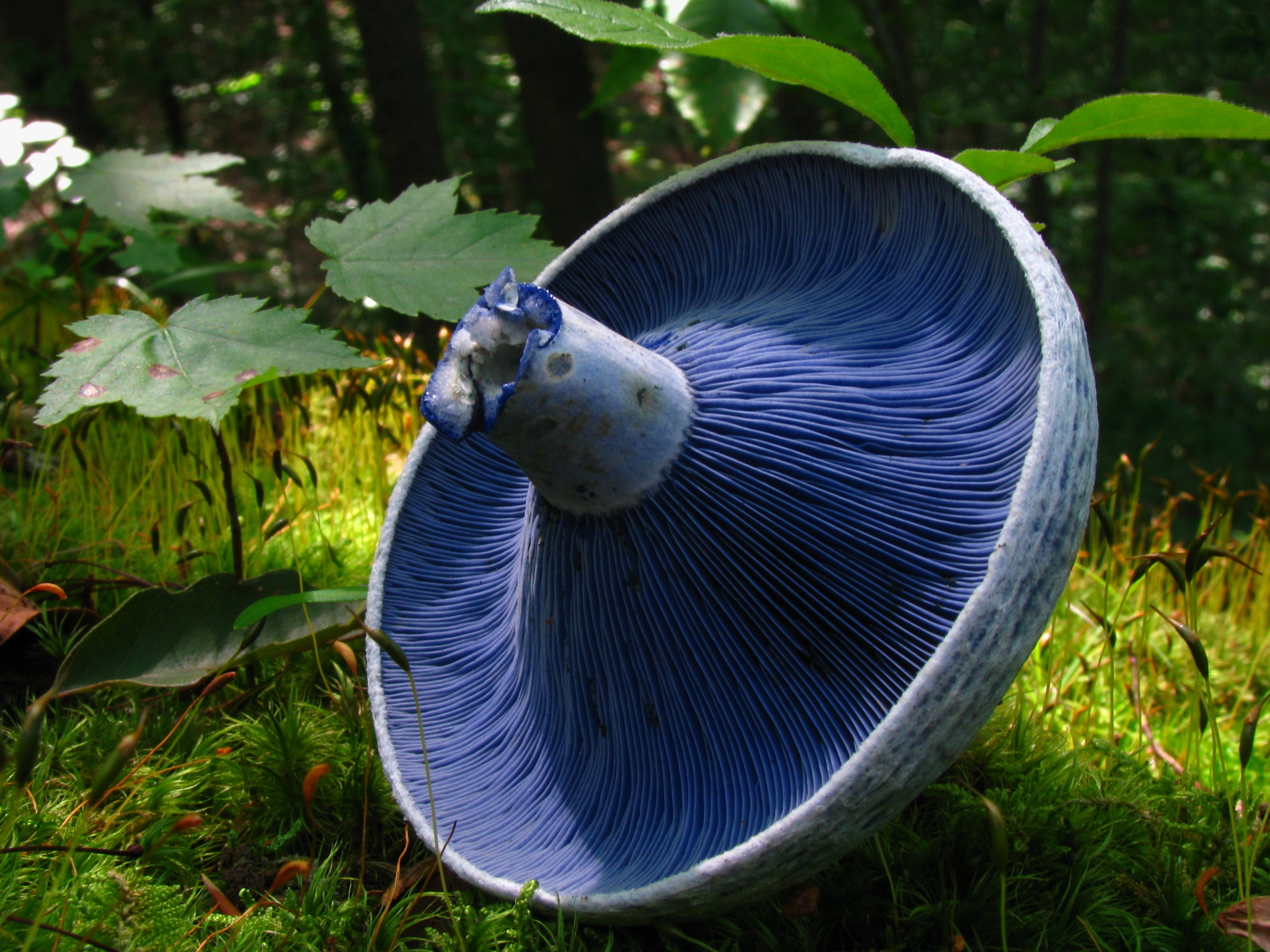
The blue color of the mushroom Lactarius indigo is due to the guaiazulene derivative (7-isopropenyl-4-methylazulen-1-yl)methyl stearate.

Guaiazulene is an U.S. FDA-approved cosmetic color additive. It – or its 3-sulfonate – is a component of some skin care products together with other skin soothing compounds such as allantoin.

Guaiazulene has applications as a volatile dye with a known evaporation rate to indicate end of use of various products (such as insecticide strips).
