= Lactarius lazulinus =

Scientific classification
- Kingdom: Fungi
- Division: Basidiomycota
- Class: Agaricomycetes
- Order: Russulales
- Family: Russulaceae
- Genus: Lactarius
- Species: L. lazulinus

Binomial name
- Lactarius lazulinus Stubbe, Verbeken & Watling (2007)

Species of fungus

Lactarius lazulinus is a member of the large milk-cap genus Lactarius in the order Russulales. It was first described scientifically in 2007.
