= Bisacurone =

Names
- Preferred IUPAC name (6S)-6-[(1R,4S,5S)-4,5-Dihydroxy-4-methylcyclohex-2-en-1-yl]-2-methylhept-2-en-4-one

Identifiers
CAS Number	120681-81-4
3D model (JSmol)	Interactive image
ChemSpider	10259030
PubChem CID	14287397
UNII	SA836UFA35
CompTox Dashboard (EPA)	DTXSID501336136
- InChI: InChI=1S/C15H24O3/c1-10(2)7-13(16)8-11(3)12-5-6-15(4,18)14(17)9-12/h5-7,11-12,14,17-18H,8-9H2,1-4H3/t11-,12+,14-,15-/m0/s1 Key: QJOWFYQIUZMPRY-NEBZKDRISA-N
- SMILES: C[C@@H](CC(=O)C=C(C)C)[C@H]1C[C@@H]([C@@](C=C1)(C)O)O

Properties
Chemical formula	C_{15}H_{24}O_{3}
Molar mass	252.354 g·mol^{−1}
- Except where otherwise noted, data are given for materials in their standard state (at 25 °C [77 °F], 100 kPa). Infobox references

Bisacurone is a chemical compound with the molecular formula C_{15}H_{24}O_{3} which has been isolated from turmeric (Curcuma longa). In vitro, it has several effects including anti-inflammatory, anti-oxidant, and anti-metastatic properties.
