= Azulene =

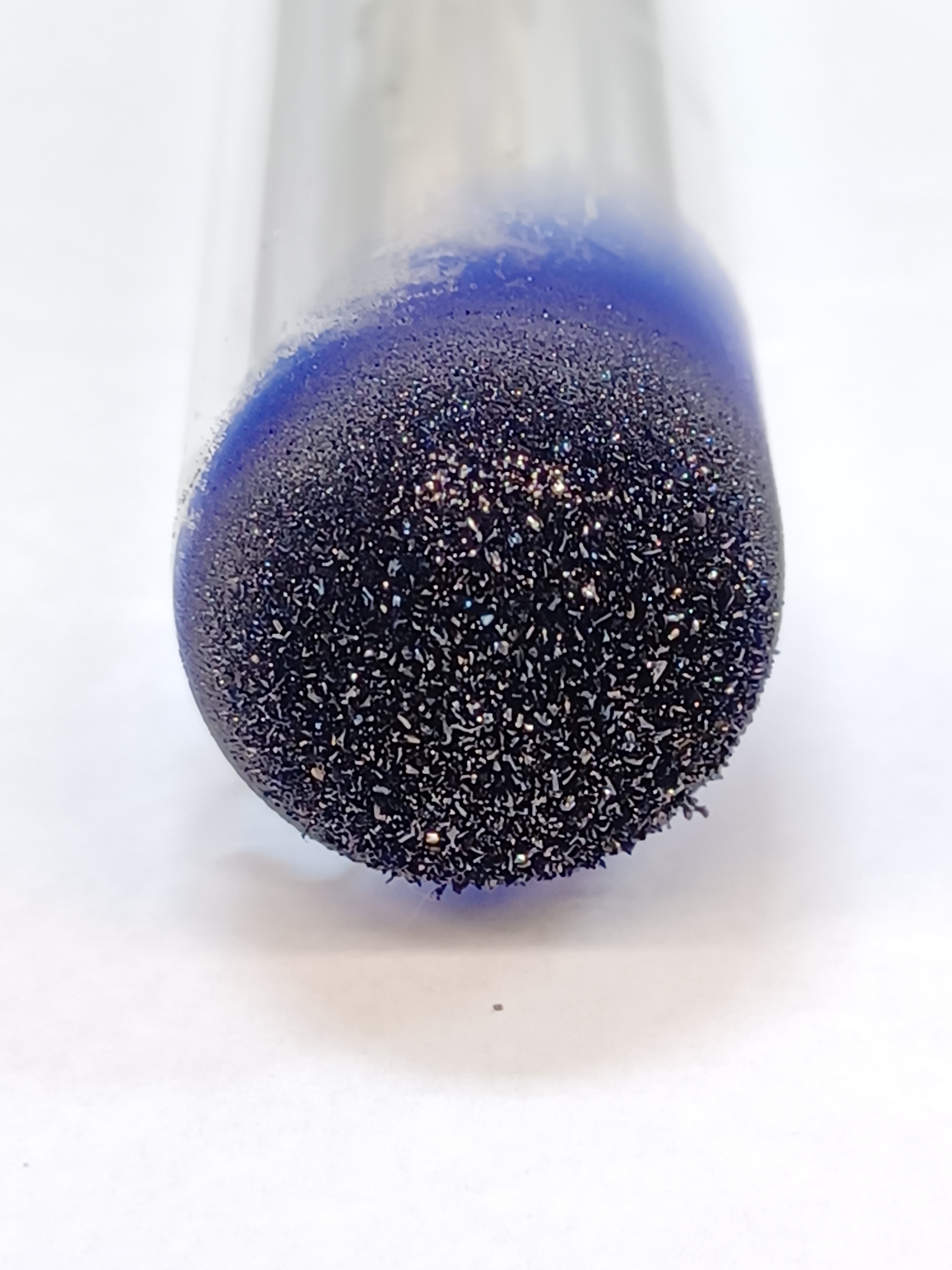
- Sublimated azulene on a cold finger

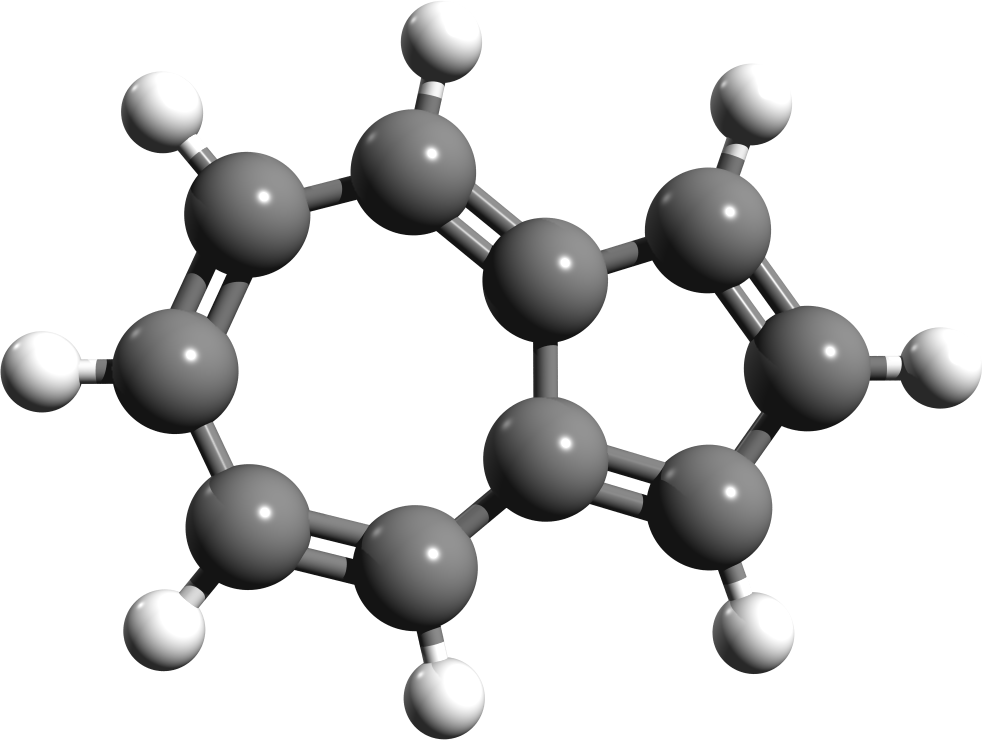

Names
- Preferred IUPAC name Azulene
- Systematic IUPAC name Bicyclo[5.3.0]deca-2,4,6,8,10-pentaene

Identifiers
CAS Number	275-51-4
3D model (JSmol)	Interactive image
ChEBI	CHEBI:31249
ChemSpider	8876
ECHA InfoCard	100.005.449
KEGG	C13392
PubChem CID	9231
UNII	82R6M9MGLP
CompTox Dashboard (EPA)	DTXSID2059770
- InChI: InChI=1S/C10H8/c1-2-5-9-7-4-8-10(9)6-3-1/h1-8H Key: CUFNKYGDVFVPHO-UHFFFAOYSA-N; InChI=1/C10H8/c1-2-5-9-7-4-8-10(9)6-3-1/h1-8H Key: CUFNKYGDVFVPHO-UHFFFAOYAT
- SMILES: c1cccc2cccc2c1

Properties
Chemical formula	C_{10}H_{8}
Molar mass	128.174 g·mol^{−1}
Appearance	Dark blue crystalline solid
Melting point	99 to 100 °C (210 to 212 °F; 372 to 373 K)
Boiling point	242 °C (468 °F; 515 K)
Magnetic susceptibility (χ)	−98.5·10^{−6} cm^{3}/mol

Thermochemistry
Std enthalpy of combustion (Δ_{c}H^{⦵}_{298})	−1266.5 kcal/mol

Related compounds
Related compounds	Naphthalene; Bicyclo(6.2.0)decapentaene; Pentalene; Heptalene; Sesquifulvalene
- Except where otherwise noted, data are given for materials in their standard state (at 25 °C [77 °F], 100 kPa). Infobox references

Azulene is an aromatic organic compound and an isomer of naphthalene. Naphthalene is colourless, whereas azulene is dark blue. The compound is named after its colour, as "azul" is Spanish for blue. Two terpenoids, vetivazulene (4,8-dimethyl-2-isopropylazulene) and guaiazulene (1,4-dimethyl-7-isopropylazulene), that feature the azulene skeleton are found in nature as constituents of pigments in mushrooms, guaiac wood oil, and some marine invertebrates.

Azulene has a long history, dating back to the 15th century as the azure-blue chromophore obtained by steam distillation of German chamomile. The chromophore was discovered in yarrow and wormwood and named in 1863 by Septimus Piesse. Its structure was first reported by Lavoslav Ružička, followed by its organic synthesis in 1937 by Placidus Plattner.

== Structure and bonding ==
Blue azulene pigments found in mushrooms

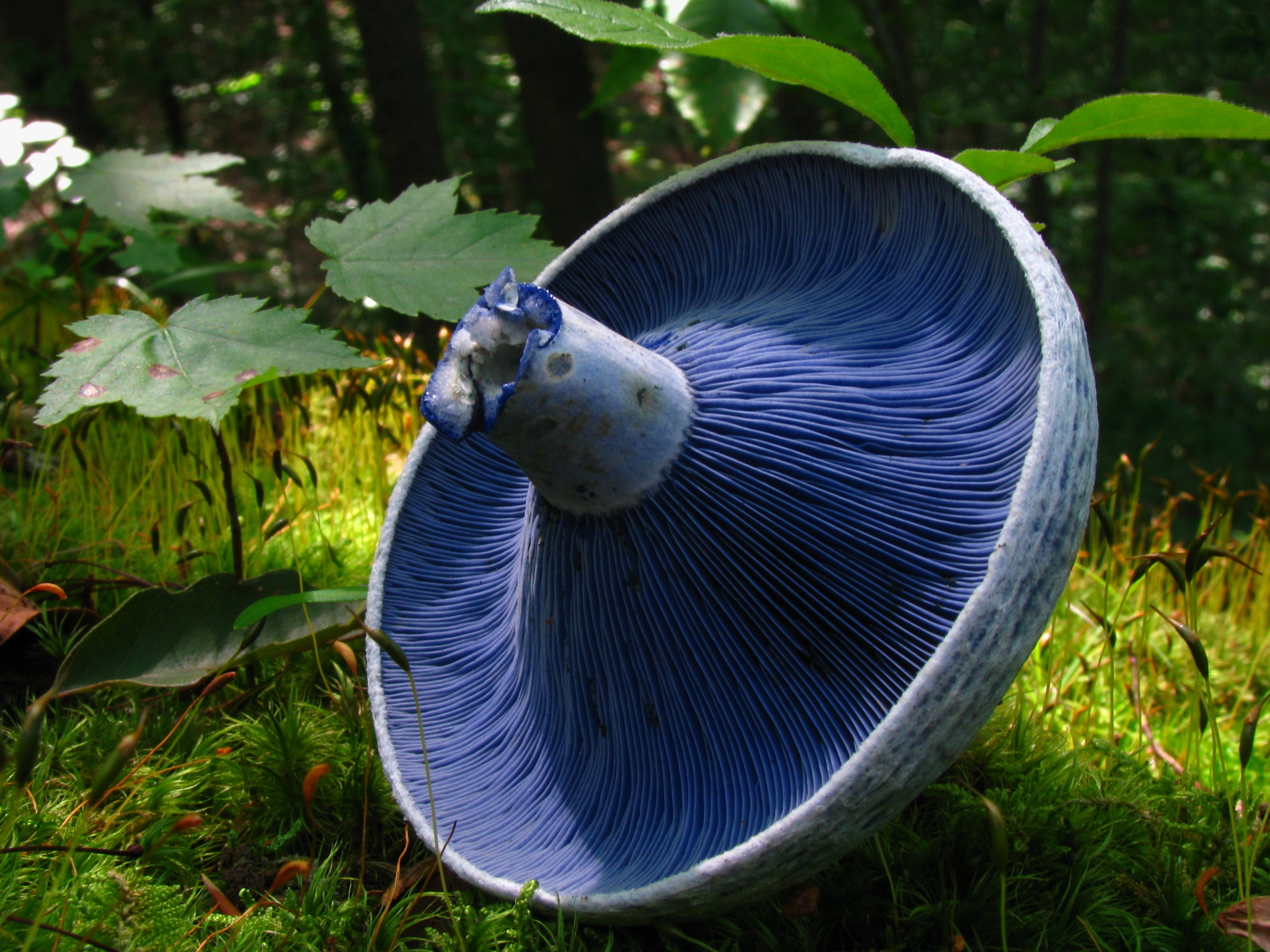
Lactarius indigo: (7-isopropenyl-4-methylazulen-1-yl)methyl stearate.

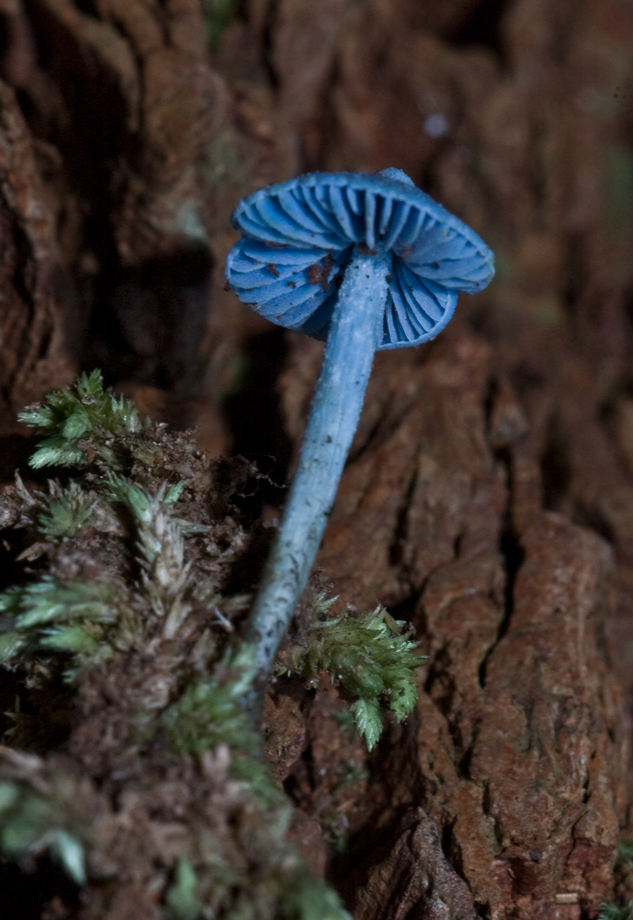
Entoloma hochstetteri: 7-acetyl-1,4-dimethylazulene.

Azulene is usually viewed as resulting from fusion of cyclopentadiene and cycloheptatriene rings. Like naphthalene and cyclodecapentaene, it is a 10 pi electron system. It exhibits aromatic properties: (i) the peripheral bonds have similar lengths and (ii) it undergoes Friedel-Crafts-like substitutions. The stability gain from aromaticity is estimated to be half that of naphthalene.

Its dipole moment is 1.08 D, in contrast with naphthalene, which has a dipole moment of zero. This polarity can be explained by regarding azulene as the fusion of a 6 π-electron cyclopentadienyl anion and a 6 π-electron tropylium cation: one electron from the seven-membered ring is transferred to the five-membered ring to give each ring aromatic stability by Hückel's rule. Reactivity studies confirm that seven-membered ring is electrophilic and the five-membered ring is nucleophilic.

The dipolar nature of the ground state is reflected in its deep colour, which is unusual for small unsaturated aromatic compounds. Another notable feature of azulene is that it violates Kasha's rule by exhibiting fluorescence from an upper-excited state (S_{2} → S_{0}).

== Organic synthesis ==
Synthetic routes to azulene have long been of interest because of its unusual structure. In 1939 the first method was reported by St. Pfau and Plattner starting from indane and ethyl diazoacetate.

An efficient one-pot route entails annulation of cyclopentadiene with unsaturated C_{5}-synthons. The alternative approach from cycloheptatriene has long been known, one illustrative method being shown below.

Procedure:

1. cycloheptatriene 2+2 cycloaddition with dichloro ketene
2. diazomethane insertion reaction
3. dehydrohalogenation reaction with DMF
4. Luche reduction to alcohol with sodium borohydride
5. elimination reaction with Burgess reagent
6. oxidation with p-chloranil
7. dehalogenation with polymethylhydrosiloxane, palladium(II) acetate, potassium phosphate and the DPDB ligand (BINAP)

Another synthesis route starts by treating pyridinium or pyrylium salts with cyclopentadienyl anion:

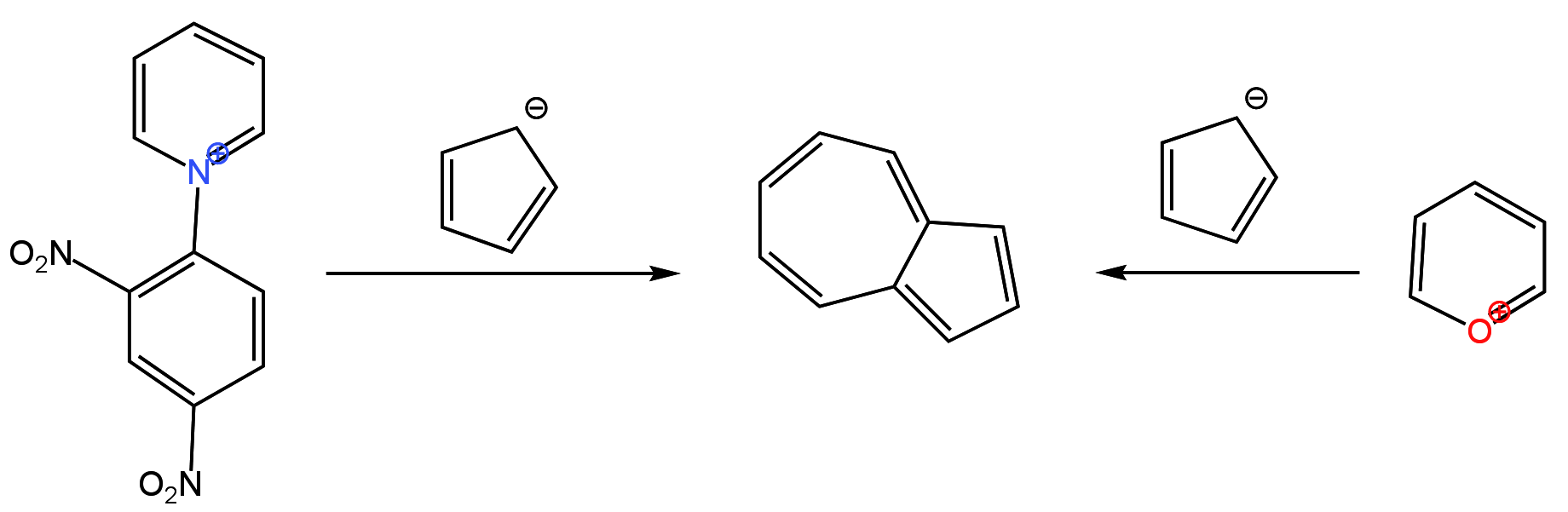

Azulene can also be synthesized via a Diels Alder and retro-Diels Alder reaction:

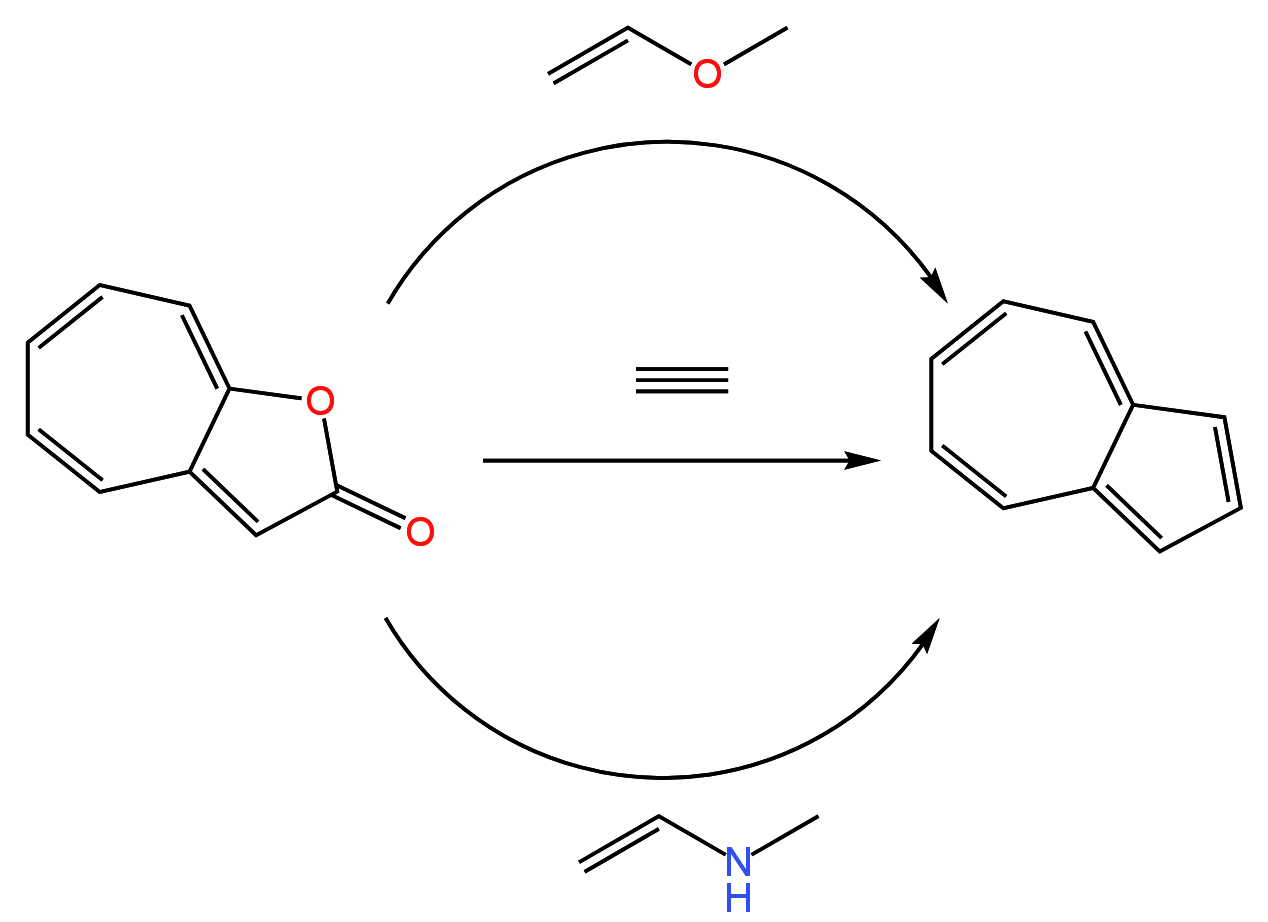

The starting material of the above reaction can be generated through the flash vacuum pyrolysis of phenyl propiolate.

== Organometallic complexes ==
In organometallic chemistry, azulene serves as a ligand for low-valent metal centers. Illustrative complexes are (azulene)Mo_{2}(CO)_{6} and (azulene)Fe_{2}(CO)_{5}.

== Derivatives ==
1-Hydroxyazulene is an unstable green oil and it does not show keto–enol tautomerism. 2-Hydroxyazulene is obtained by hydrolysis of 2-methoxyazulene with hydrobromic acid. It is stable and does show keto–enol tautomerism. The pK_{a} of 2-hydroxyazulene in water is 8.71. It is more acidic than phenol or naphthol. The pK_{a} of 6-hydroxyazulenes in water is 7.38 making it also more acidic than phenol or naphthol.

In naphth[a]azulene, a naphthalene ring is condensed at the 1,2-positions of azulene. In one such system deviation from planarity is found, similar to that of tetrahelicene.

Guaiazulene (1,4-dimethyl-7-isopropylazulene) is an alkylated derivative of azulene with an almost identical intensely blue colour. It is commercially available to the cosmetics industry where it functions as a skin conditioning agent.
