= Vetivazulene =

Chemical compound

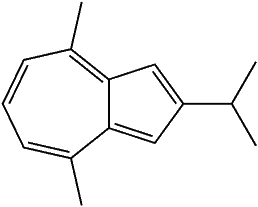
- Vetivazulene

Names
- Preferred IUPAC name 4,8-Dimethyl-2-(propan-2-yl)azulene

Identifiers
CAS Number	529-08-8
3D model (JSmol)	Interactive image
ChemSpider	61551
ECHA InfoCard	100.007.683
PubChem CID	68253
UNII	5DFF5RUP6X
CompTox Dashboard (EPA)	DTXSID80200940
- InChI: InChI=1S/C15H18/c1-10(2)13-8-14-11(3)6-5-7-12(4)15(14)9-13/h5-10H,1-4H3 Key: APVKGMMYGFJZHY-UHFFFAOYSA-N; InChI=1/C15H18/c1-10(2)13-8-14-11(3)6-5-7-12(4)15(14)9-13/h5-10H,1-4H3 Key: APVKGMMYGFJZHY-UHFFFAOYAH
- SMILES: c12c(cccc(c1cc(c2)C(C)C)C)C

Properties
Chemical formula	C_{15}H_{18}
Molar mass	198.31 g/mol
Melting point	32 to 33 °C (90 to 91 °F; 305 to 306 K)
- Except where otherwise noted, data are given for materials in their standard state (at 25 °C [77 °F], 100 kPa). verify (what is ?) Infobox references

Vetivazulene is an azulene derivate obtained from vetiver oil. It is a bicyclic sesquiterpene and an isomer of guaiazulene.
