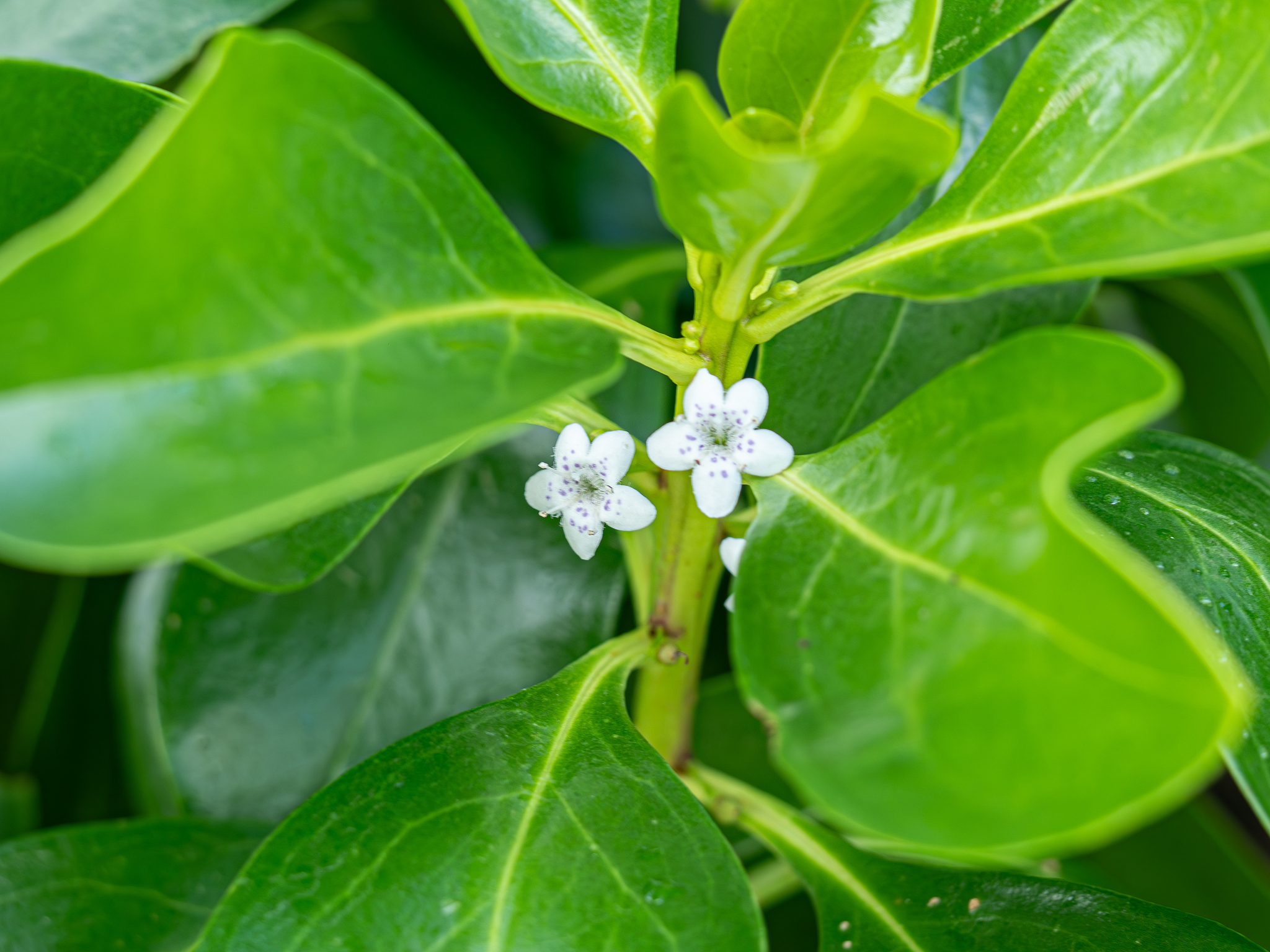

Scientific classification
- Kingdom: Plantae
- Clade: Tracheophytes
- Clade: Angiosperms
- Clade: Eudicots
- Clade: Asterids
- Order: Lamiales
- Family: Scrophulariaceae
- Genus: Myoporum
- Species: M. crassifolium

Binomial name
- Myoporum crassifolium G.Forst.

= Myoporum crassifolium =

Species of shrub

Myoporum crassifolium is a plant in the family Scrophulariaceae. It is a shrub or small tree with thick, fleshy leaves and small groups of white flowers spotted with pink or purple. It is endemic to New Caledonia, Vanuatu and the Loyalty Islands and is a rich source of the essential oil, bisabolol.

== Description ==
Myoporum crassifolium is a shrub or small tree which grows to a height of 6 metres (20 ft). The leaves are arranged alternately and are 28–145 millimetres (1–6 in) long, 11–44 millimetres (0.4–2 in) wide, glabrous, thick and fleshy. They are elliptic to egg-shaped, sometimes with the narrower end towards the base, shiny on both surfaces with the mid-vein more prominent on the lower surface.

The flowers are arranged in groups of 3 to 6 in the axils of the leaves and have 5 sepals and 5 white, spotted pink petals joined at their base to form a tube. The tube is 4–6 millimetres (0.16–0.24 in) long and the lobes are spreading and 2.2–3.6 millimetres (0.09–0.1 in) long. There are 4 stamens which extend slightly beyond the petals. The fruit is a pale purple to mauve, roughly spherical drupe, 5–7 millimetres (0.2–0.3 in) long.

== Taxonomy and naming ==
Myoporum crassifolium was first formally described in 1786 by Georg Forster in Florulae Insularum Australium Prodromus. The specific epithet (crassifolium) means "thick-leaved".

== Distribution and habitat ==
Myoporum crassifolium occurs in New Caledonia including the Loyalty Islands and on Efate and Aneityum islands in Vanuatu. It grows in shrubland and on rocky areas behind beaches.

== Conservation ==
Myoporum crassifolium is classified as "not threatened".

== Uses ==
=== Essential oils ===
On the L'Île-des-Pins, this species is an ingredient of a medicinal preparation and inner parts of the branches can be used as torches, burning with a white light and producing a pleasant scent. More than 80% of the essential oil extracted from Myoporum crassifolium is bisabolol.
