= Lactarius cyanescens =

Scientific classification
- Domain: Eukaryota
- Kingdom: Fungi
- Division: Basidiomycota
- Class: Agaricomycetes
- Order: Russulales
- Family: Russulaceae
- Genus: Lactarius
- Species: L. cyanescens

Binomial name
- Lactarius cyanescens Stubbe, Verbeken & Watling (2007)

Species of fungus

Lactarius cyanescens is a member of the large milk-cap genus Lactarius in the order Russulales. It was first described as new to science in 2007.

== See also ==
- List of Lactarius species
