= Longifolene =

(+)-Longifolene
- Longifolene

Names
- IUPAC name (1R,2S,7S,9S)- 3,3,7-trimethyl- 8-methylenetricyclo- [5.4.0.0^{2,9}]undecane

Identifiers
CAS Number	(+): 475-20-7; (−): 16846-09-6
3D model (JSmol)	(+): Interactive image; (−): Interactive image
Beilstein Reference	5731712 2044263 4663756
ChEBI	(+): CHEBI:49282; (−): CHEBI:49286
ChemSpider	(+): 16739255; (−): 1013315
ECHA InfoCard	100.006.812
EC Number	(+): 207-491-2
PubChem CID	(+): 1796220; (−): 1201520
UNII	(+): 3YXH7YY8WM
CompTox Dashboard (EPA)	(+): DTXSID9047045
- InChI: InChI=1S/C15H24/c1-10-11-6-7-12-13(11)14(2,3)8-5-9-15(10,12)4/h11-13H,1,5-9H2,2-4H3/t11-,12-,13+,15-/m1/s1 Key: PDSNLYSELAIEBU-GUIRCDHDSA-N
- SMILES: (+): C[C@]12CCCC([C@@H]3[C@H]1CC[C@@H]3C2=C)(C)C; (−): C[C@@]12CCCC([C@H]3[C@@H]1CC[C@H]3C2=C)(C)C

Properties
Chemical formula	C_{15}H_{24}
Molar mass	204.36 g/mol
Density	0.928 g/cm^{3}
Boiling point	254 °C (489 °F; 527 K) (706 mm Hg)

Hazards
- GHS labelling
Pictograms	(GHS07: Exclamation mark) (GHS08: Health hazard) (GHS09: Environmental hazard)
Signal word	Danger
Hazard statements	H304, H317, H410
Precautionary statements	P261, P272, P273, P280, P301+P310, P302+P352, P321, P331, P333+P313, P363, P391, P405, P501
- Except where otherwise noted, data are given for materials in their standard state (at 25 °C [77 °F], 100 kPa). verify (what is ?) Infobox references

Longifolene is a common sesquiterpene. It is an oily liquid hydrocarbon found primarily in the high-boiling fraction of certain pine resins. The name is derived from that of a pine species from which the compound was isolated. It is a tricyclic chiral molecule. The enantiomer commonly found in pines and other higher plants exhibits a positive optical rotation of +42.73°. The other enantiomer (optical rotation −42.73°) is found in small amounts in certain fungi and liverworts.

== Occurrence ==
Terpentine obtained from Pinus longifolia (obsolete name for Pinus roxburghii Sarg.) contains as much as 20% of longifolene.

Longifolene is also one of two most abundant aroma constituents of lapsang souchong tea, because the tea is smoked over pinewood fires.

== Biosynthesis ==
The biosynthesis of longifolene begins with farnesyl diphosphate (1) (also called farnesyl pyrophosphate) by means of a cationic polycyclization cascade. Loss of the pyrophosphate group and cyclization by the distal alkene gives intermediate 3, which by means of a 1,3-hydride shift gives intermediate 4. After two additional cyclizations, intermediate 6 produces longifolene by a 1,2-alkyl migration.

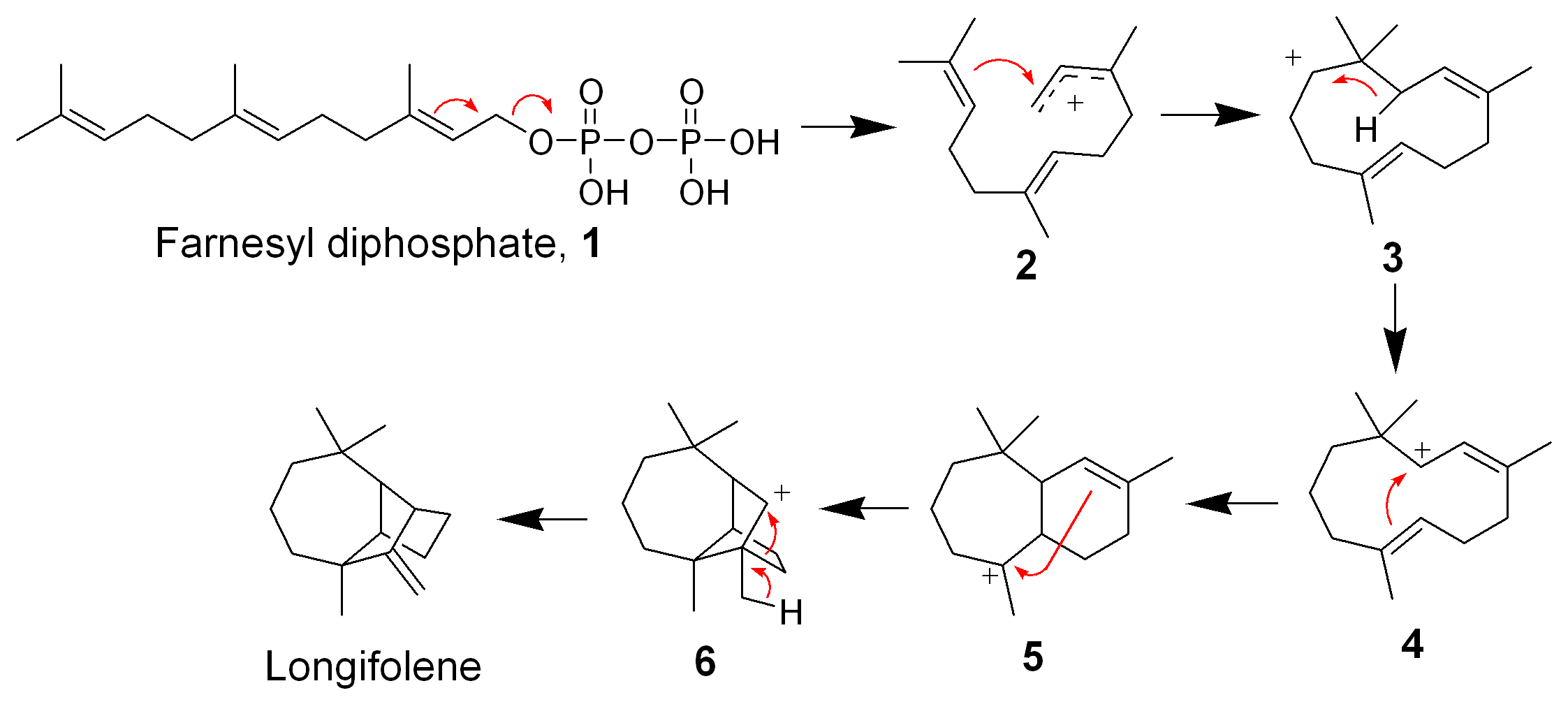
The biosynthesis of longifolene

== Synthesis and related chemistry ==
The laboratory characterization and synthesis of longifolene has long attracted attention.

Longifolene total synthesis by Corey

Longifolene total synthesis by Corey

It reacts with borane to give the derivative dilongifolylborane, which is a chiral hydroborating agent.
