= Lactarius mirabilis =

Scientific classification
- Kingdom: Fungi
- Division: Basidiomycota
- Class: Agaricomycetes
- Order: Russulales
- Family: Russulaceae
- Genus: Lactarius
- Species: L. mirabilis

Binomial name
- Lactarius mirabilis Stubbe, Verbeken & Watling (2007)

Species of fungus

Lactarius mirabilis is a species of milkcap fungus in the very large genus Lactarius in the order Russulales. It was first described in 2007.
