= Sesquiterpene =

Class of terpenes

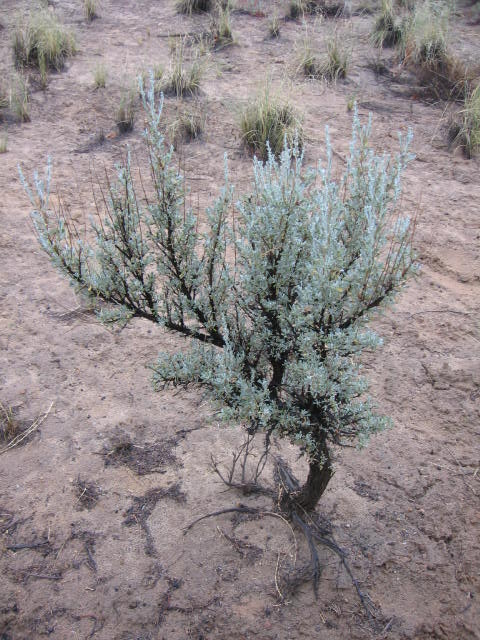
Big Sagebrush (Artemisia tridentata) contains sesquiterpene lactones which are sesquiterpenoids (built from three isoprene units) and contain a lactone ring, hence the name. These compounds are found in many other plants and can cause allergic reactions and toxicity if consumed in excess, particularly in grazing livestock.

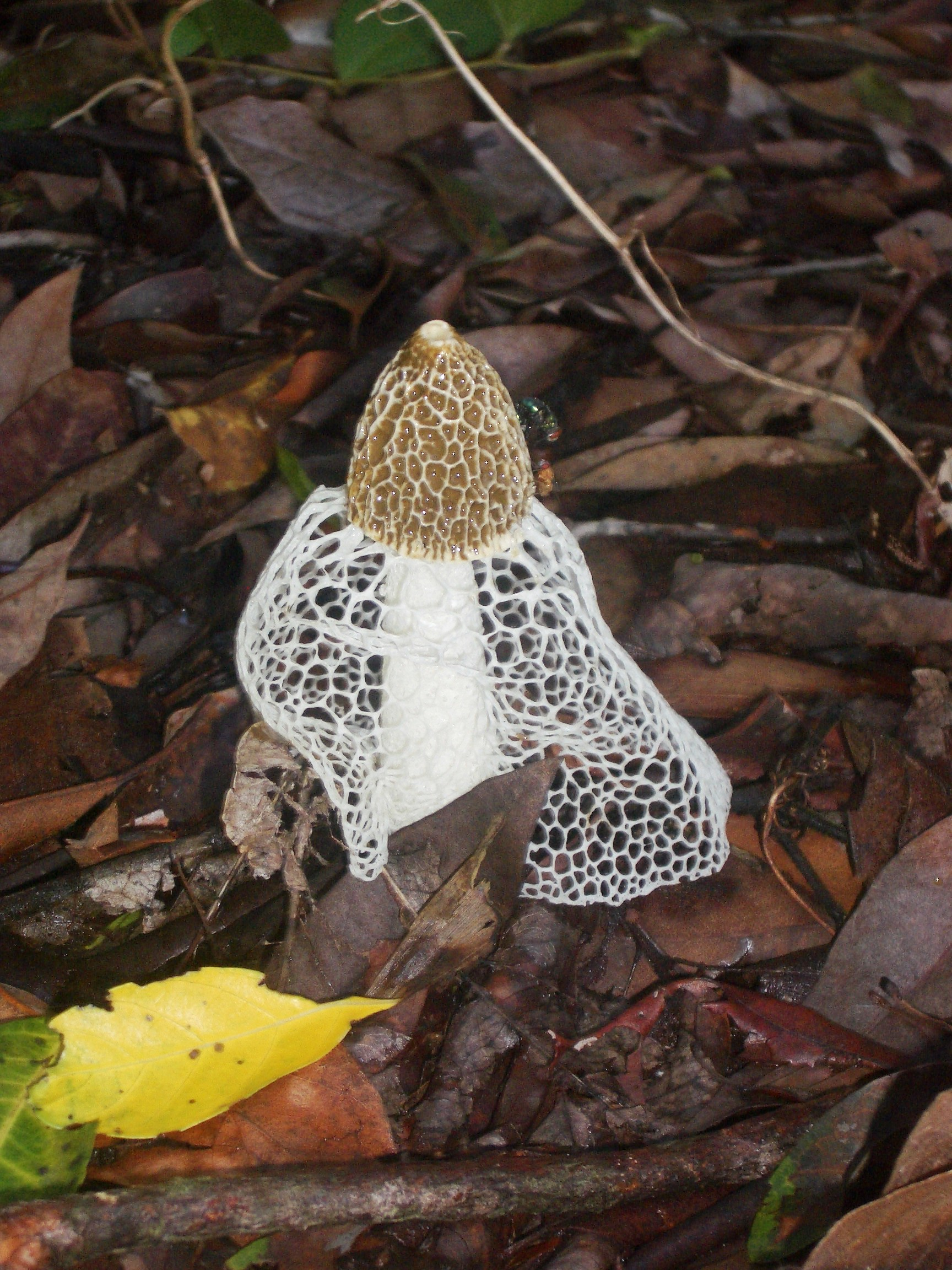
Phallus indusiatus, in Cooktown, Queensland, Australia, which produces two unique sesquiterpenes

Sesquiterpenes are a class of terpenes that consist of three isoprene units and often have the molecular formula C_{15}H_{24}. Like monoterpenes, sesquiterpenes may be cyclic or contain rings, including many combinations. Biochemical modifications such as oxidation or rearrangement produce the related sesquiterpenoids. It is estimated (2006) that 3000 sesquiterpenes have been identified.

== Biosynthesis and examples ==
The reaction of geranyl pyrophosphate with isopentenyl pyrophosphate results in the 15-carbon farnesyl pyrophosphate (FPP), which is an intermediate in the biosynthesis of sesquiterpenes such as farnesene.

Farnesyl pyrophosphate, precursor to all sesquiterpenes

Cyclic sesquiterpenes are more common than cyclic monoterpenes because of the increased chain length and additional double bond in the sesquiterpene precursors. In addition to common six-membered ring systems such as the ones found in zingiberene and bisacurone, cyclization of one end of the chain to the other end can lead to macrocyclic rings such as humulene.

Selected sesquiterpenes and sesquiterpenoids

Longifolene, found in terpentine

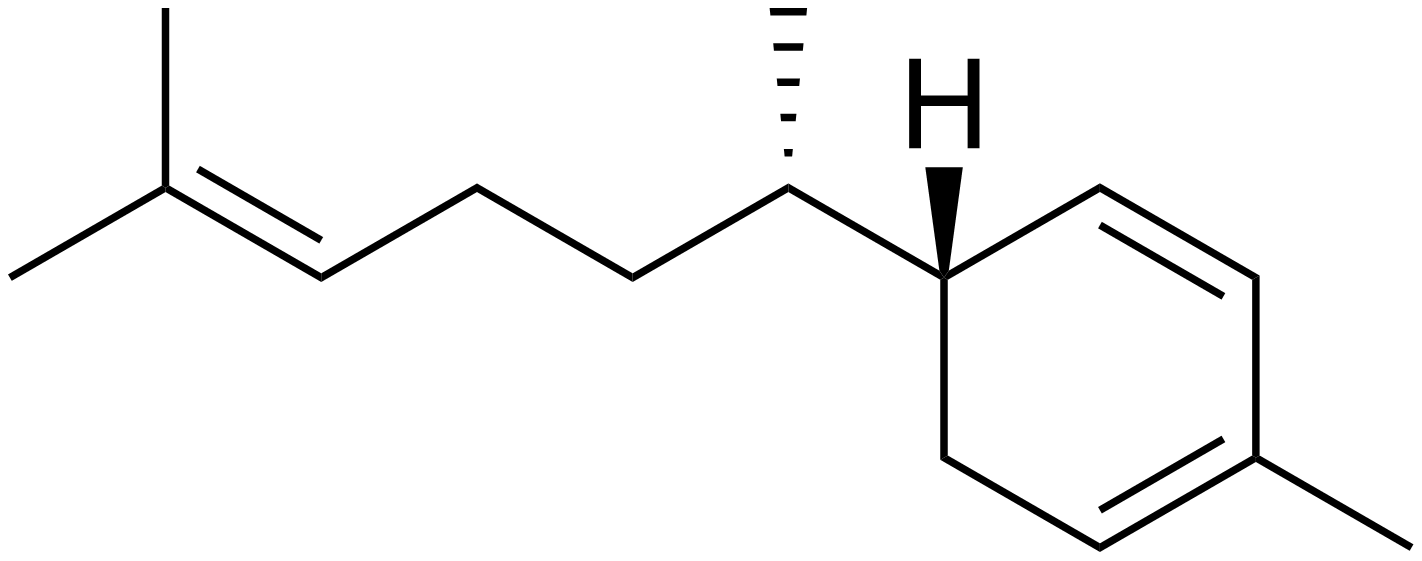
Zingiberene, abundant in ginger

δ-Cadinene, found in cade juniper

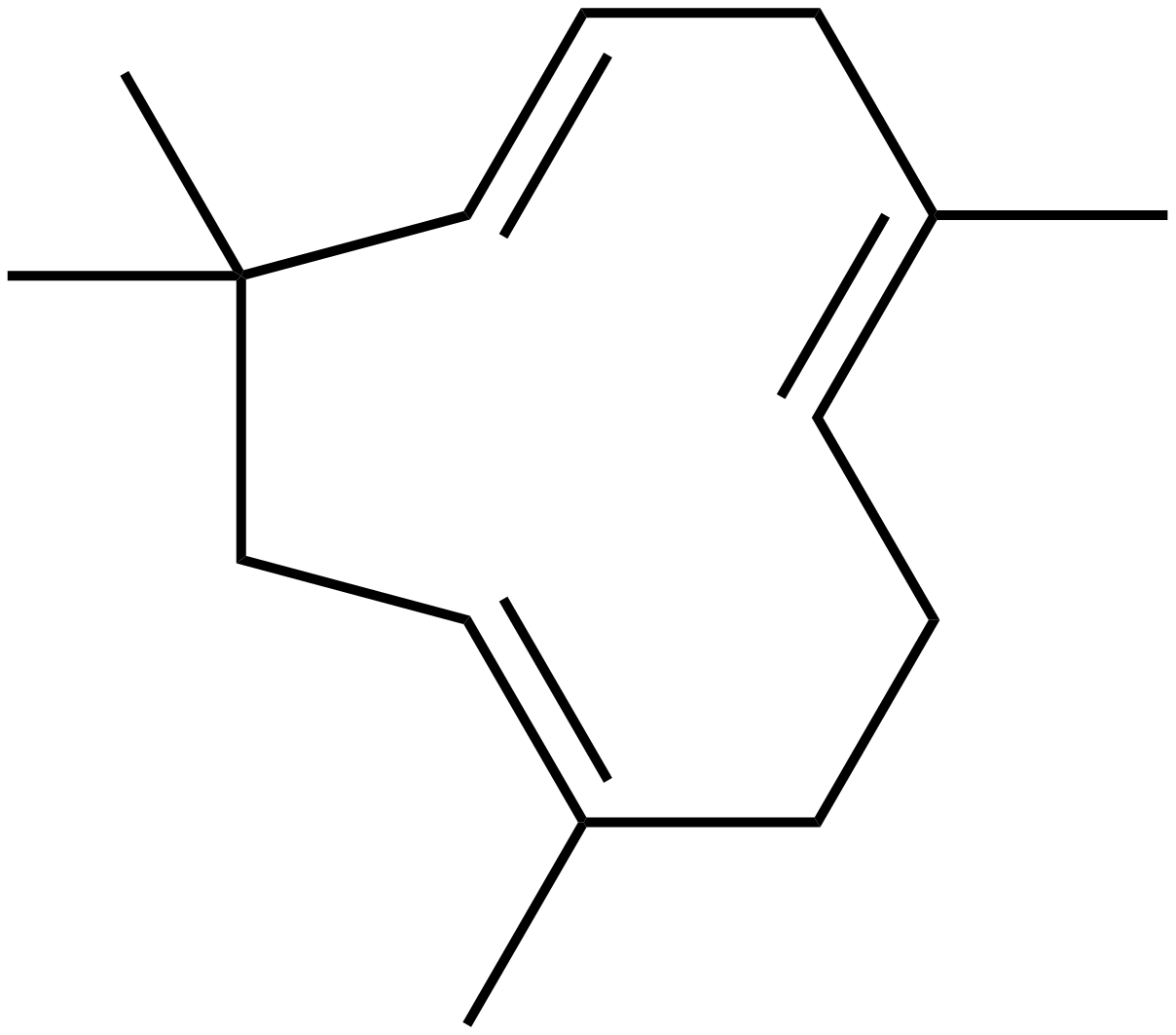
Humulene, found in hops.

Caryophyllene, which is pervasive but especially in cloves.

The cadinenes contain two fused six-membered rings. Caryophyllene, a component of many essential oils such as clove oil, contains a nine-membered ring fused to a cyclobutane ring. Rishitin is another example of a cadinene, which is found in potatoes and tomatoes.

Vetivazulene and guaiazulene are aromatic bicyclic sesquiterpenoids.

With the addition of a third ring, the possible structures become increasingly varied. Examples include longifolene, copaene and the alcohol patchoulol.

=== Sesquiterpenoids ===
The FPP backbone can be rearranged in several different ways and further decorated with different functional groups, hence the large variety of sesquiterpenoids. Geosmin, the volatile compound that gives an earthy taste and musty odor in drinking water and the characteristic odor on a rainy day, is a sesquiterpenoid, produced by bacteria, especially cyanobacteria, that are present in the soils and water supplies. Oxidation of farnesene then provides the sesquiterpenoid farnesol.

Sesquiterpene lactones are a common class of sesquiterpenoids that contain a lactone ring, hence the name. They are found in many plants and can cause allergic reactions and toxicity if consumed excessively, particularly in grazing livestock.

The term merosesquiterpenoids was coined in 1968 to describe molecules of this class that have a mixed biosynthetic origin, meaning isoprenoid precursors like isopentenyl pyrophosphate are derived from both the mevalonate and non-mevalonate pathways.
