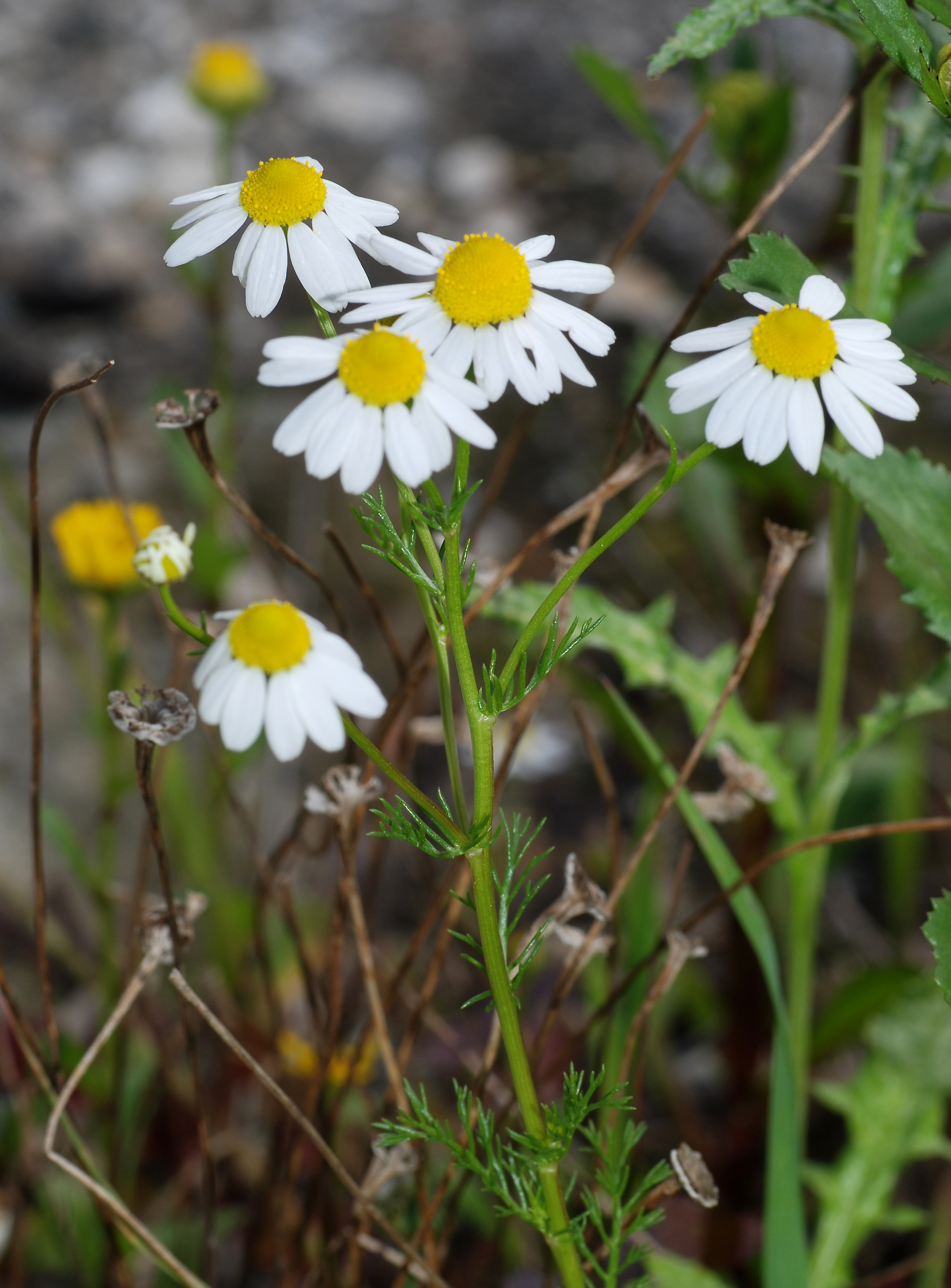

Scientific classification
- Kingdom: Plantae
- Clade: Tracheophytes
- Clade: Angiosperms
- Clade: Eudicots
- Clade: Asterids
- Order: Asterales
- Family: Asteraceae
- Genus: Matricaria
- Species: M. chamomilla

Binomial name
- Matricaria chamomilla L.

Synonyms
- Chamomilla chamomilla (L.) Rydb. Chamomilla recutita (L.) Rauschert; Matricaria recutita L. Matricaria suaveolens L. etc.

= Matricaria chamomilla =

Species of flowering plant

Matricaria chamomilla (synonym: Matricaria recutita), commonly known as chamomile (also spelled camomile), German chamomile, Hungarian chamomile (kamilla), wild chamomile, blue chamomile, or scented mayweed, is an annual plant of the composite family Asteraceae. Commonly, the name M. recutita is applied to the herbal product chamomile, although other species are also used as chamomile. The plant is commonly used to make a tea.

M. chamomilla, historically used in various ancient cultures and commonly promoted today for a range of conditions, shows limited reliable evidence for effectiveness, may have mild side effects or drug interactions, and should be used with caution—especially around allergies, estrogen-sensitive conditions, and during pregnancy.

== Description ==
Matricaria chamomilla is a member of the Asteraceae family, native to southern and eastern Europe. It can be found on all continents, has a branched, erect and smooth stem, and grows to a height of 15–60 cm (6–24 in). The long and narrow leaves are bipinnate or tripinnate. The flowers are borne in paniculate flower heads (capitula). The white ray florets are furnished with a ligule, while the disc florets are yellow. The hollow receptacle is swollen and lacks scales. This property distinguishes German chamomile from Anthemis arvensis (corn chamomile), which has a receptacle with scales. The flowers bloom in early to midsummer and are fragrant.

The essential oil of the flowers gives them a characteristic smell and has interesting properties. The blue color of the oil, attributable to the chamazulene it contains, explains why the plant is also known by the common name blue chamomile. The fruit is a yellowish-brown achene.

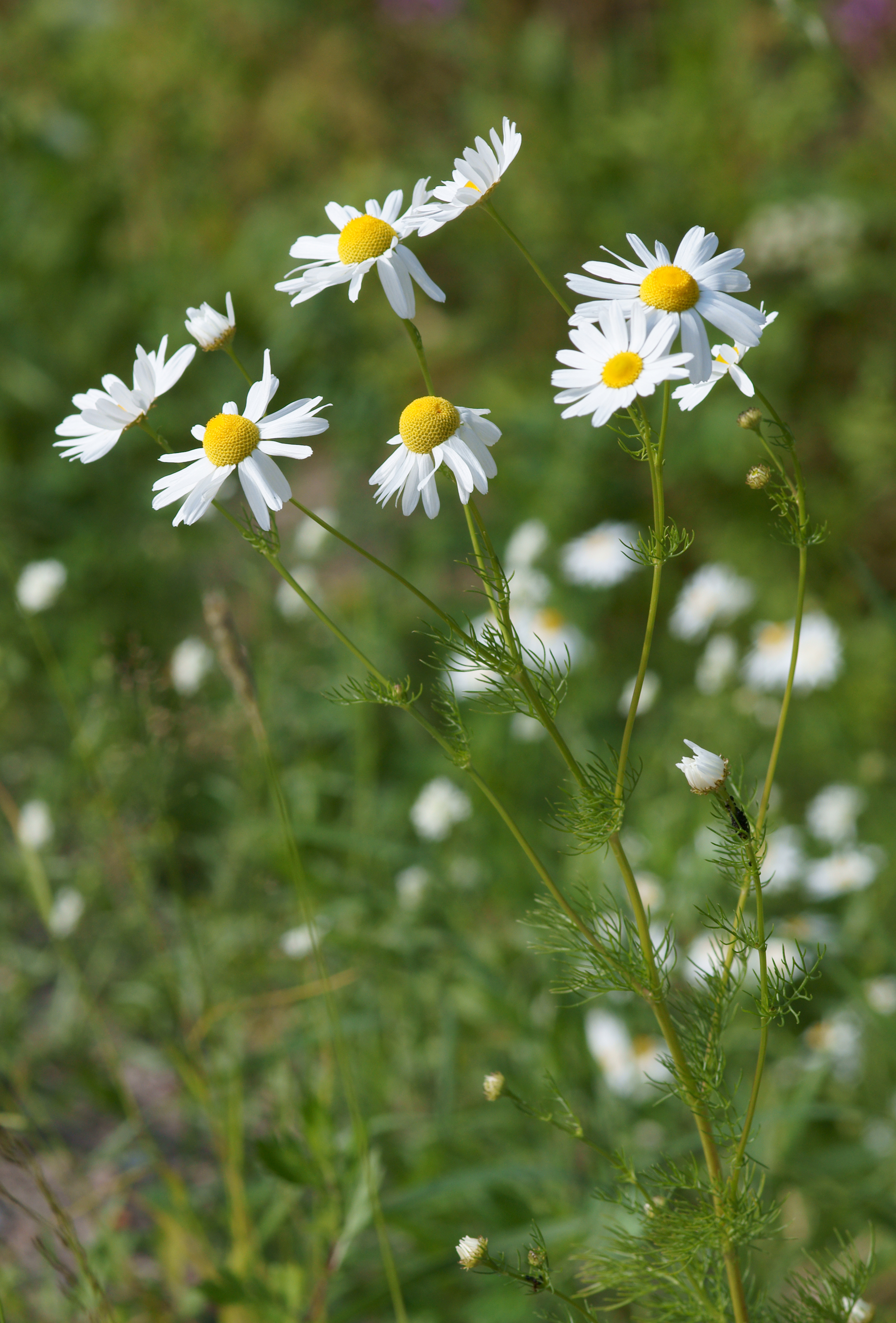
Stems and flowers

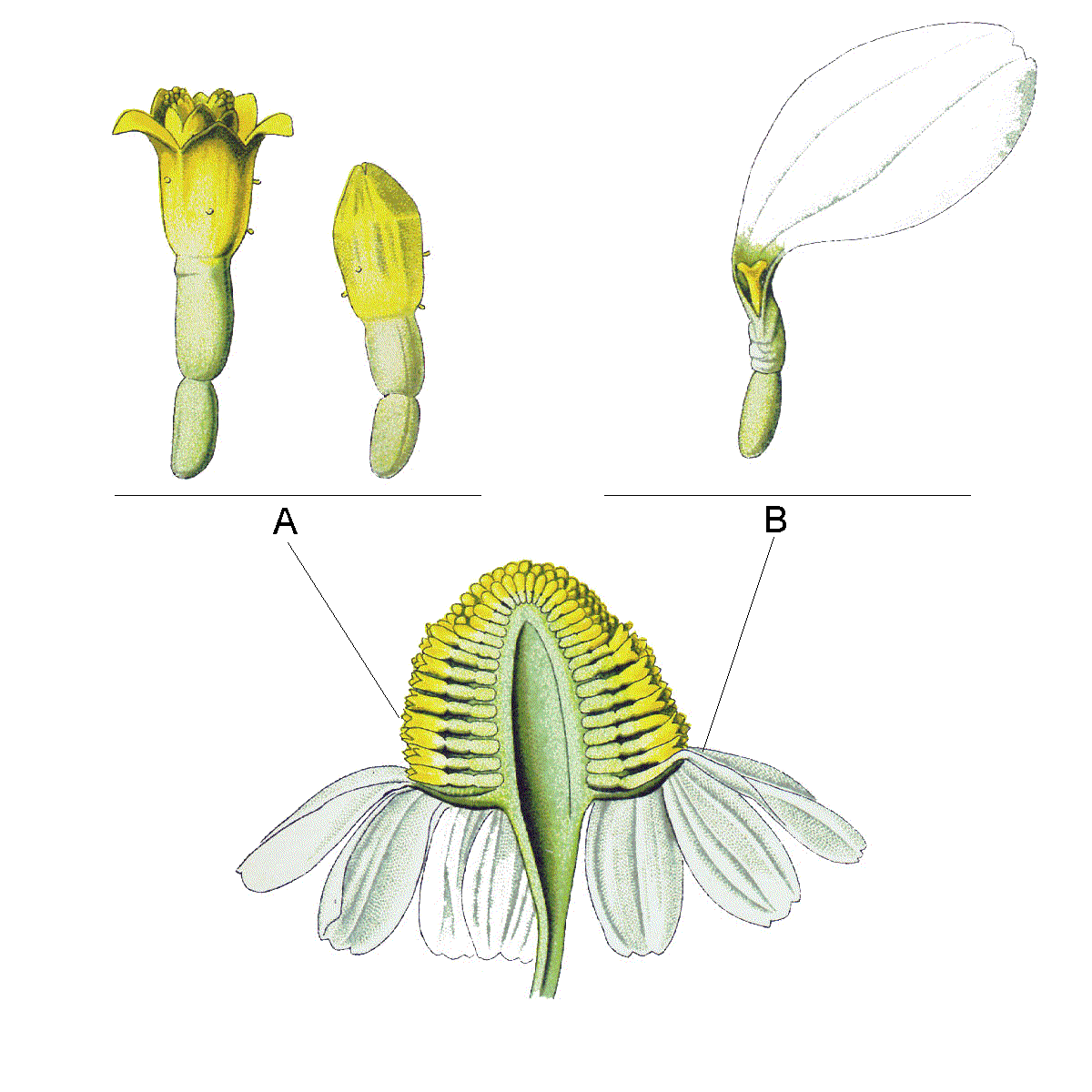
The yellow disc florets (A) and white ray florets (B)

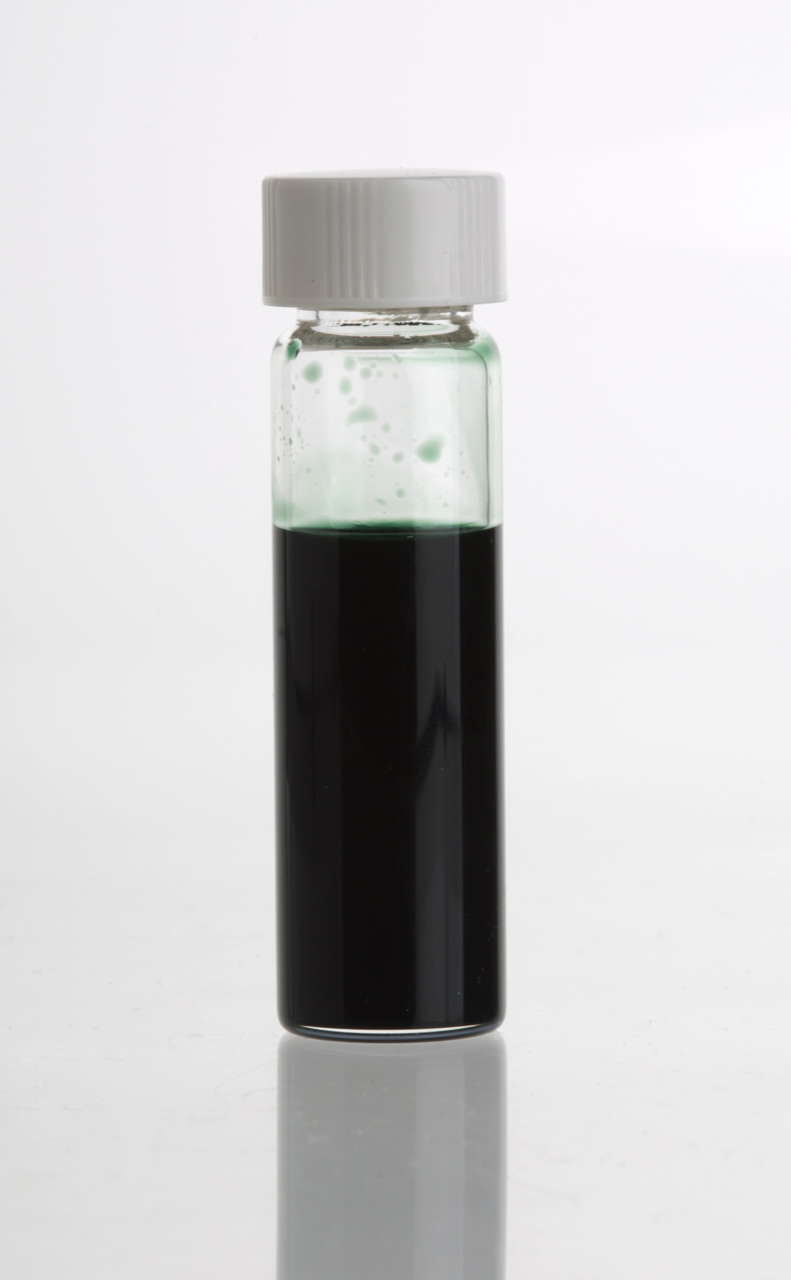
Essential oil in glass vial

== Etymology ==
The word chamomile comes from the Greek χαμαίμηλον (chamaimēlon) meaning "earth-apple", which is derived from χαμαί (chamai) meaning "on the ground" and μήλον (mēlon) meaning "apple". It is so called because of the apple-like scent of the plant.

In Latin, one of the meanings of matrix is womb; the name Matricaria was given to the genus because Matricaria chamomilla was used in ancient herbalism to treat cramps and sleep disorders related to premenstrual syndrome.

Wild chamomile and poppies at the edge of a barley field

== Cultivation ==
Chamomile does not need special soil, although it grows best on well balanced soils with good topsoil. It can be planted as an annual crop in either autumn or spring, or it can be treated as a perennial due to its ability to self-seed.

Aphids are a major insect pest in chamomile production. Its most significant diseases in Europe are downy mildew, powdery mildew and rust.

The chamomile plant often flowers 2 to 3 times per year. This is taken into account by multiple harvests per year as well. The flowering period is about 50–65 days while the development of a flower takes about 20–25 days.

== Potential adverse effects ==
It shows limited reliable evidence for effectiveness, may have mild side effects or drug interactions, and should be used with caution—especially around allergies, estrogen-sensitive conditions, and during pregnancy.

Chamomile, a relative of ragweed, can cause allergy symptoms and can cross-react with ragweed pollen in individuals with ragweed allergies. Contact dermatitis may occur when touching the plant. When consuming the tea, there is potential for drug interactions with anticoagulants.

== Uses ==
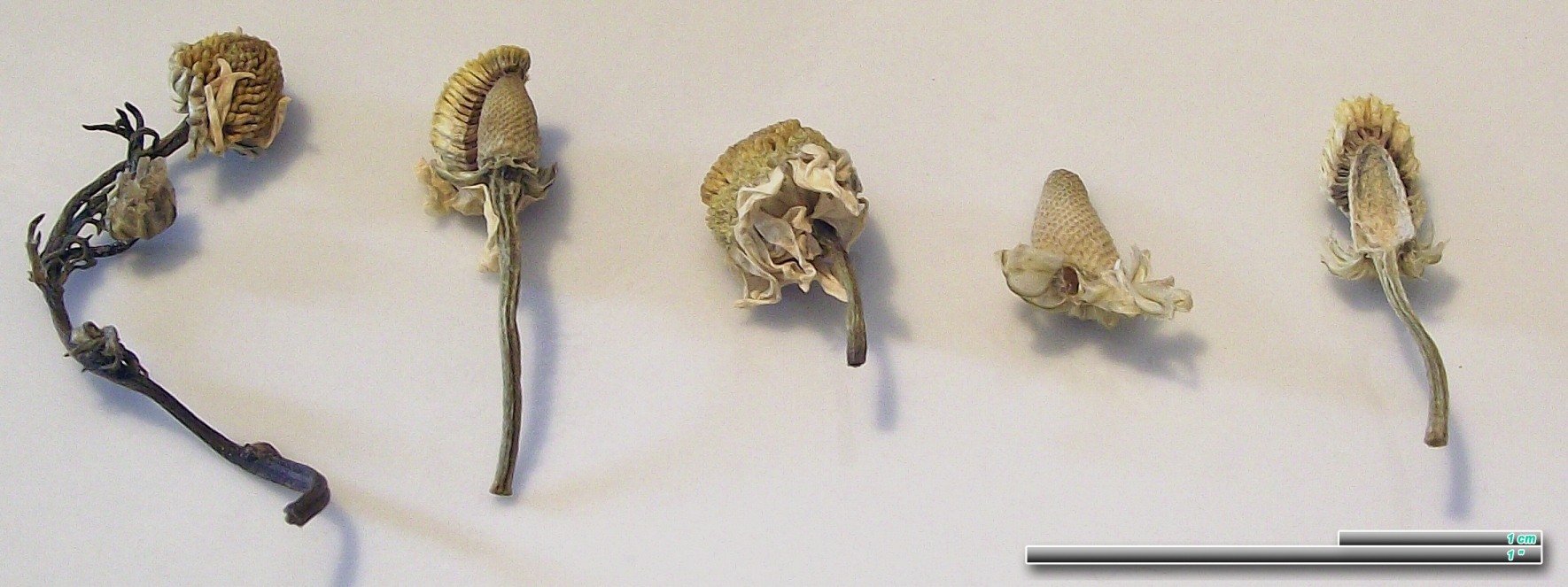
Dried M. chamomilla flower as commonly used in herbal tea

Chamomile is commonly used to make a tea. German chamomile is used in herbal medicine.

=== Phytochemistry ===
The flowers contain between 0.3 and 1.5% of the essential oil. It is extracted by distillation, mostly out of fresh flower buds and flower stalks. Bisabolol accounts for up to 33% of the oil's content.

More than 120 chemical constituents have been identified in chamomile flowers, most of them found in the essential oil. Chemical constituents of the essential oil include bisabolol, farnesene, chamazulene, apigenin, quercetin, patuletin, luteolin, and coumarin.

== See also ==
- Chamaemelum nobile (Roman chamomile)
- Matricin
