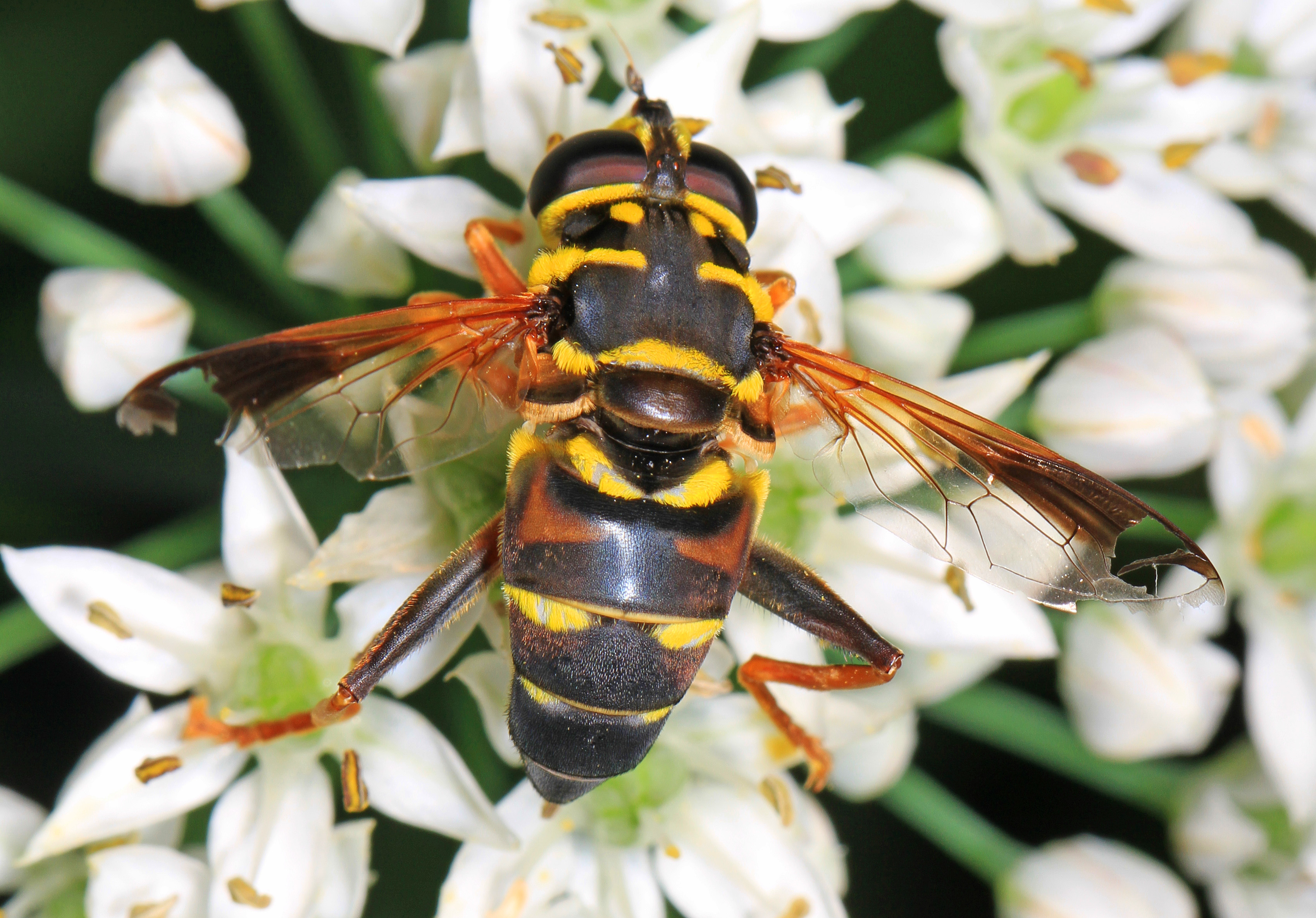

Scientific classification
- Domain: Eukaryota
- Kingdom: Animalia
- Phylum: Arthropoda
- Class: Insecta
- Order: Diptera
- Family: Syrphidae
- Tribe: Eristalini
- Subtribe: Eristalina
- Genus: Meromacrus
- Species: M. acutus

Binomial name
- Meromacrus acutus (Fabricius, 1805)
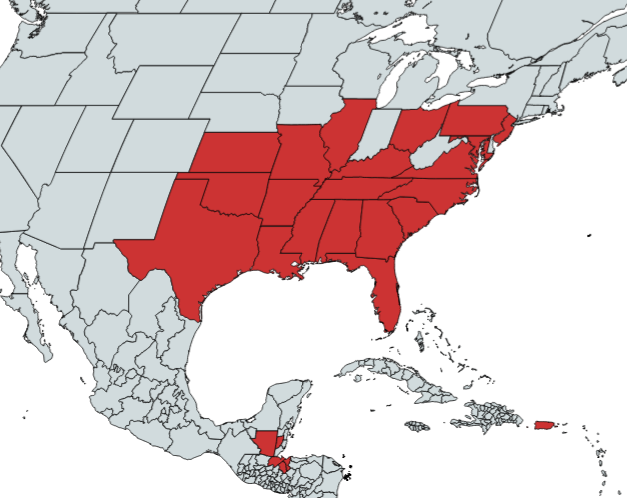
- M. acutus range 2023

Synonyms
- Eristalis pictus Macquart, 1846; Meromacrus parvus Hull, 1942; Milesia acuta Fabricius, 1805; Milesia cruciger Wiedemann, 1830

= Meromacrus acutus =

Species of fly

Meromacrus acutus, the Carolinian elegant, is a species of syrphid fly in the family Syrphidae. This uncommon species is distributed in the Eastern United States and South America (see map). Notable for the black and yellow pattern mimicking wasps. Hoverflies get their names from the ability to remain nearly motionless while in flight. The adults are also known as flower flies for they are commonly found around and on flowers, from which they get both energy-giving nectar and protein-rich pollen. The larvae are aquatic filter-feeders of the rat-tailed type. They are found in rot holes of trees.

== Description ==
For terminology see Speight key to genera and glossary
external images

Size

Length 13–18 mm (0.5–0.7 in)

Head

The front (frons) has a broad black stripe and has yellow pile on the sides below the ocelli. The face is yellowish red, thickly clothed on the sides with whitish pollen and bright yellow pile. A broad median stripe and shining black cheeks mark the face. Sometimes there is a reddish broad black facial stripe. The antennae are reddish brown on raised antennifer with orange arista: The posterior orbits have abundant short yellow pile with a gap of black at the ocellar triangle.

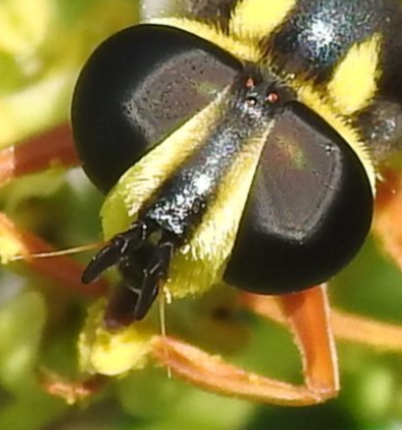
M. acutus front

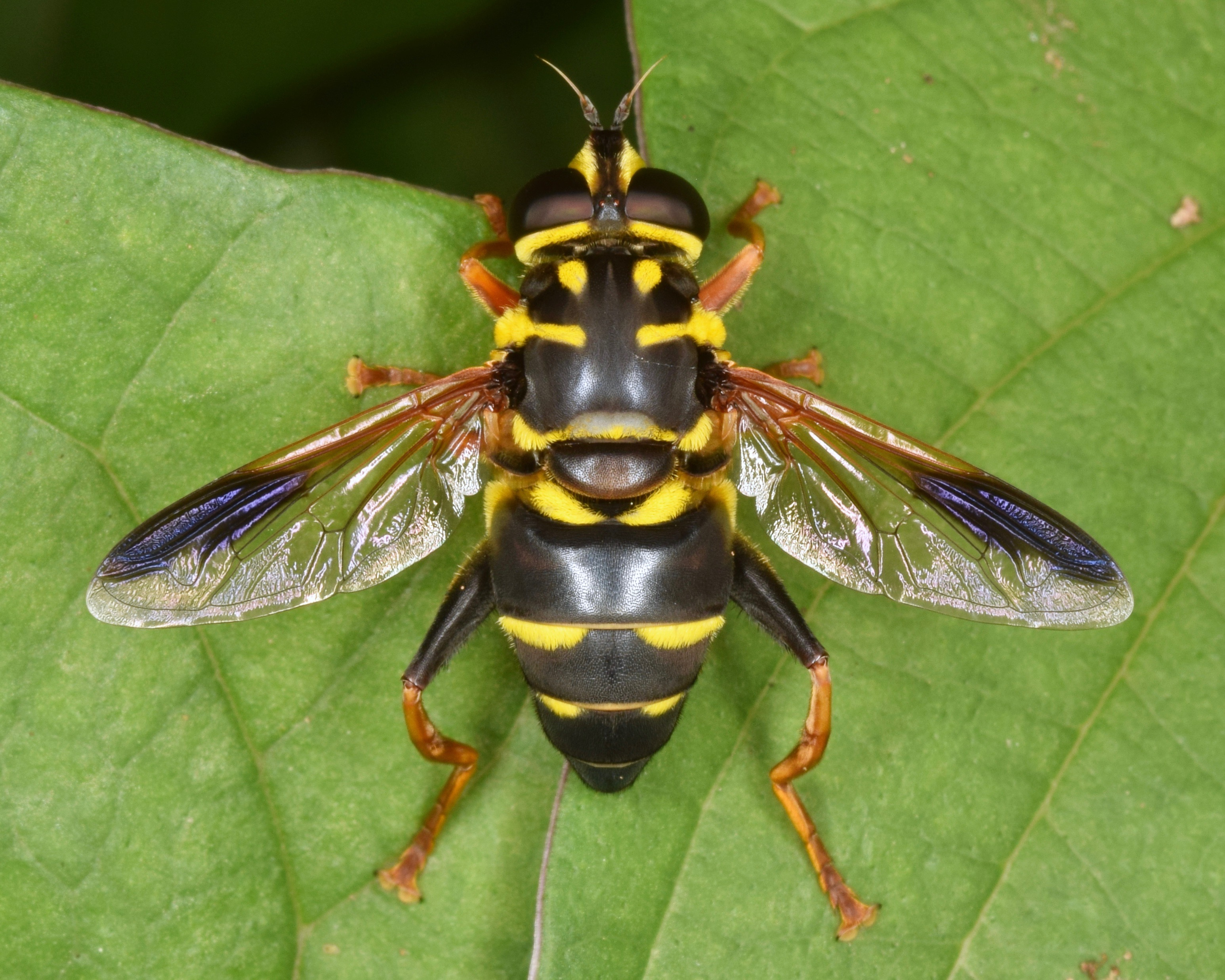
M. acutus

Thorax

The thorax is shining black with vivid golden yellow markings.
Two black stripes with short black pile go from the front of the scutum to near the lateral sutures. There are paired bright yellow oval markings next to the humerus. Transverse yellow line running along lateral suture extending to the midlegs. An irregular yellow line runs in front of the scutellum laterally to under the postalar callus. The scutellum is brown with yellowish on its posterior border. The pleurae are black with yellow spot. The anterior spiracles and also just below the humeri there are light yellow spots, and there are a posterior pair of white spots on the sides of the metanotum.

Abdomen

The abdomen is black and yellow.
The first segment is black with paired oval spots of yellow pile on the hind part. The second segment is black with narrow with a posterior yellow margin. The third segment has a yellow pilose spot on each side in front, and a quite narrow yellow hind margin. The fourth is segment similar to third, but the spots smaller, and the hind margin very narrow or missing. The male genitalia are described by Nayar.

Wings

Wings are yellowish basally with the front edge dark smoky black, filling out the sub-costal, the marginal, submarginal, outer part of first basal, and the anterior part of first posterior cells. Notable venation: spurious vein (sv) present, R_{4+5} looping into r_{4+5}, cell r_{2+3} is closed.

Legs

The legs are light reddish yellow except the hind femora is mostly black.

wing vein identification

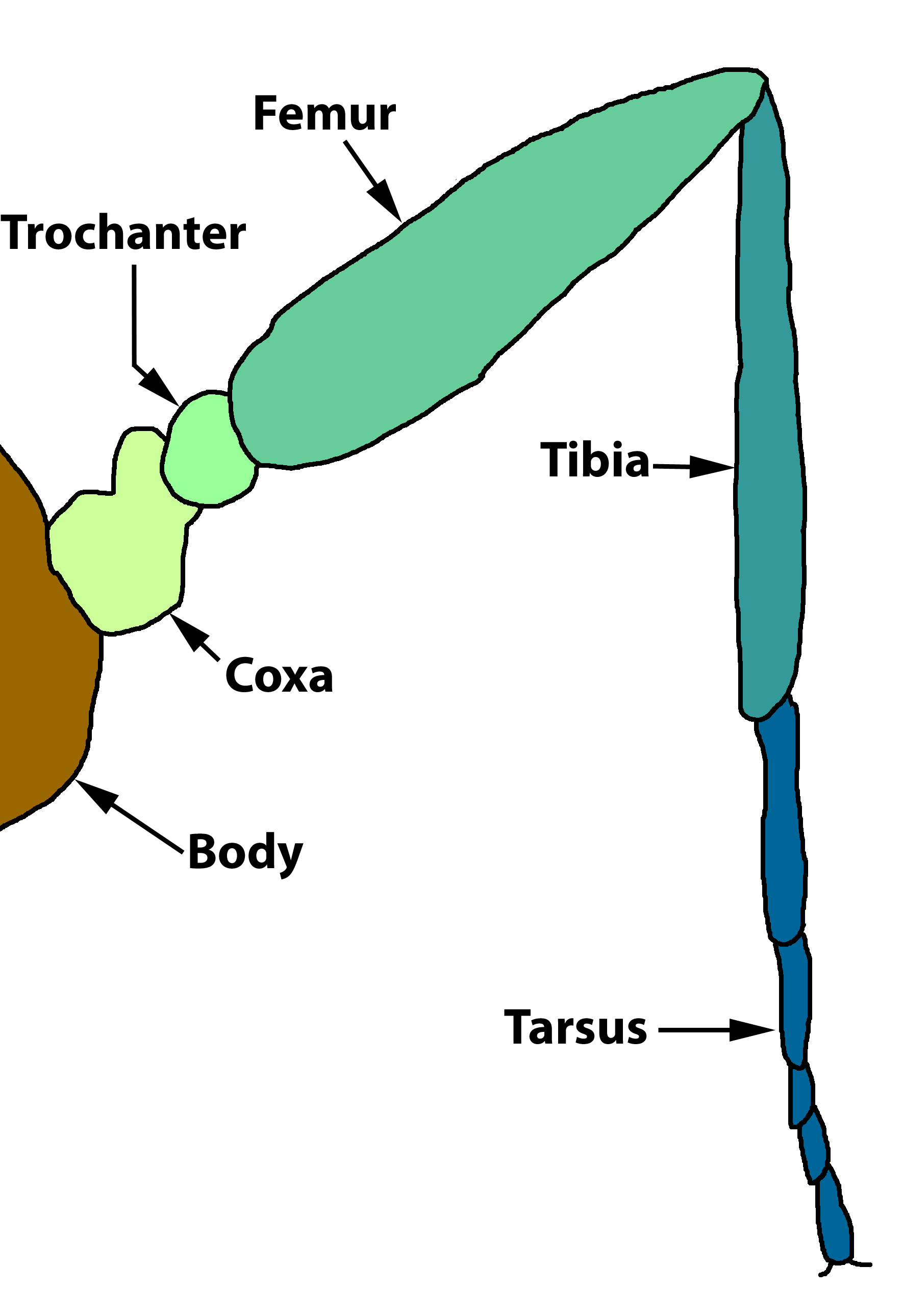
Insect leg

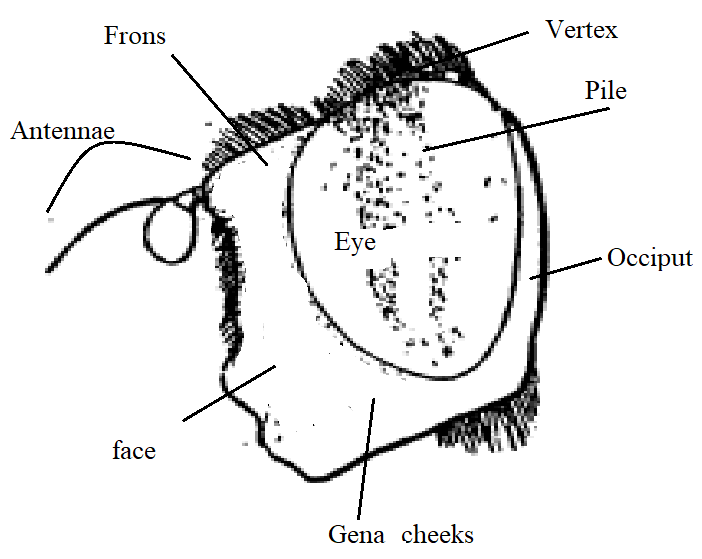
head main areas

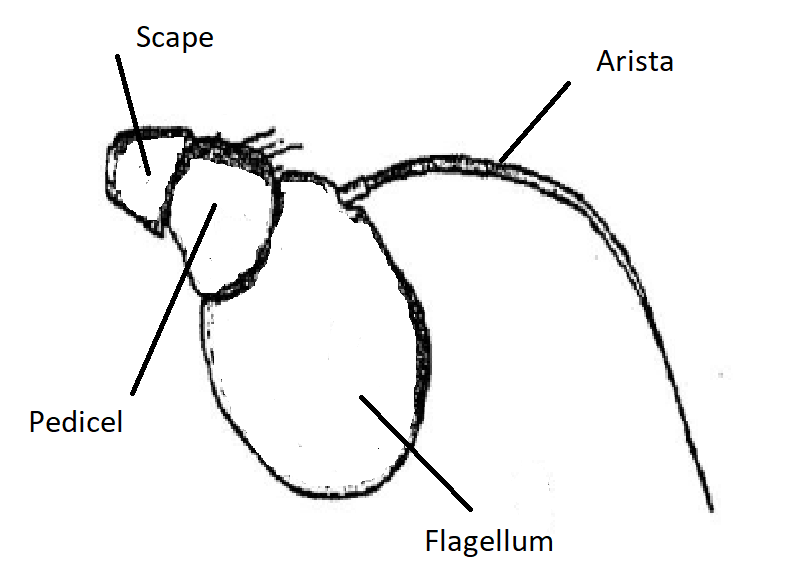
Antenna syrphid

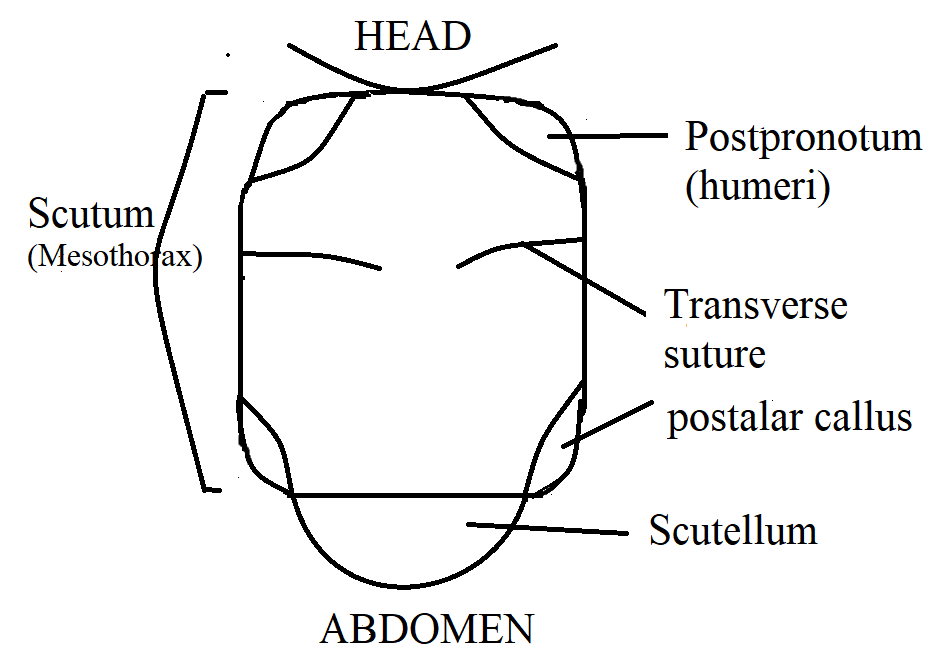
dorsal view of Syrphid thorax
