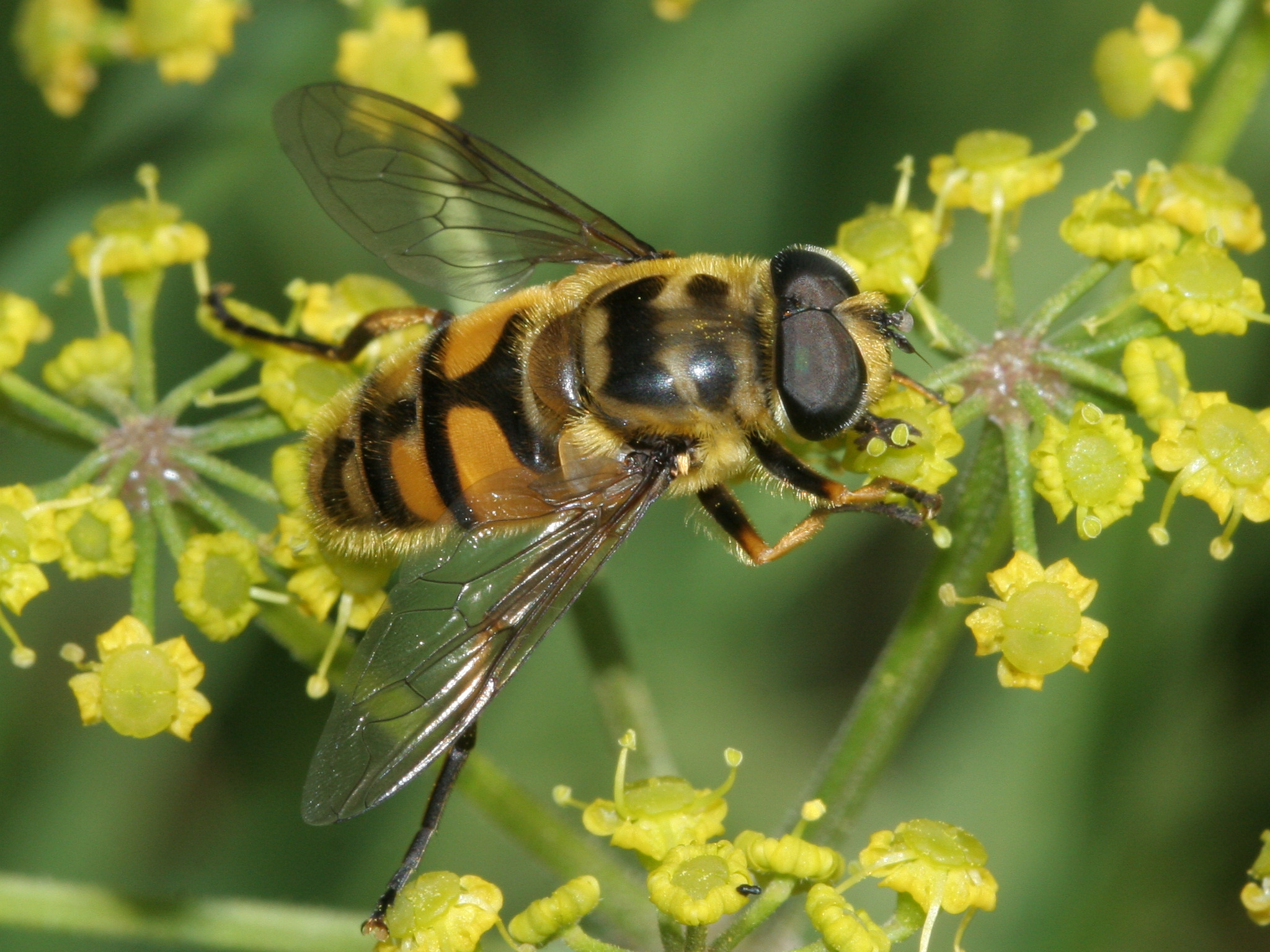
- Male
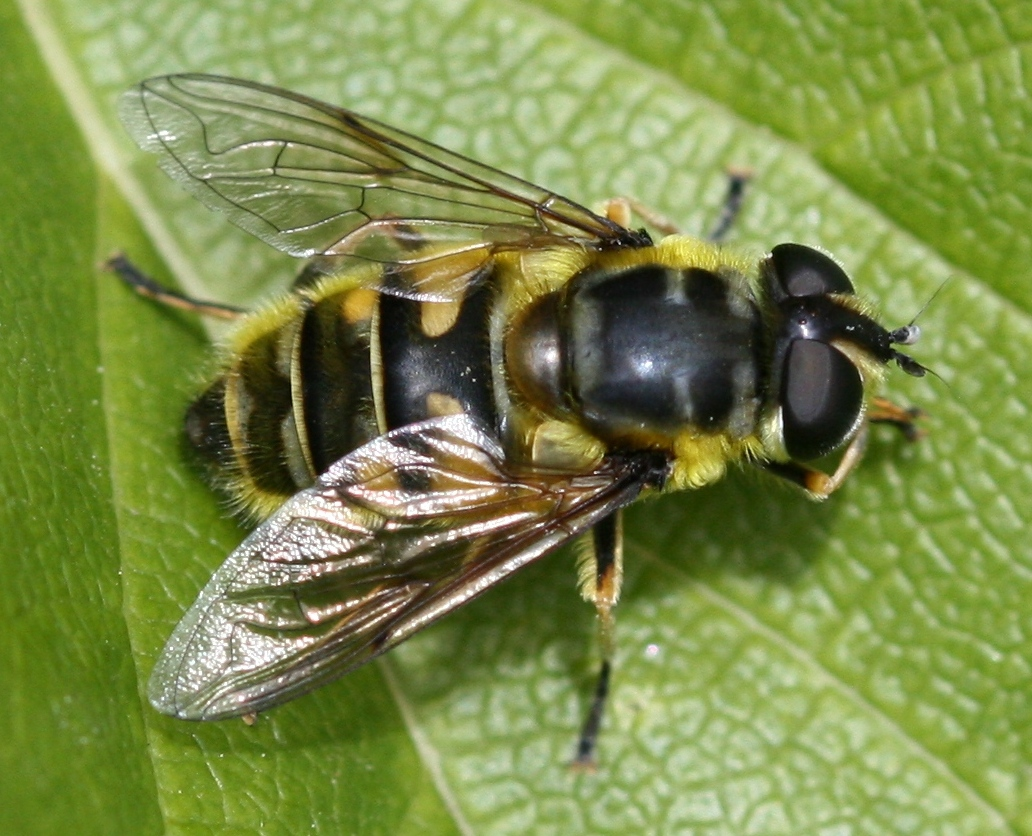
- Female

Scientific classification
- Kingdom: Animalia
- Phylum: Arthropoda
- Clade: Pancrustacea
- Class: Insecta
- Order: Diptera
- Family: Syrphidae
- Genus: Myathropa
- Species: M. florea

Binomial name
- Myathropa florea (Linnaeus, 1758)

Synonyms
- Musca florea Linnaeus, 1758; Musca ablecta Harris, 1776; Myathropa ablecta (Harris, 1776)

= Myathropa florea =

Species of fly

Myathropa florea, sometimes referred to as the Yellow-haired Sun Fly or the Batman hoverfly, is a very common European and North African species of hoverfly. Adults may be seen on flowers from May to September. It is of a similar size to the common drone fly (Eristalis tenax), but M. florea is generally more yellow, with two light bands to the thorax, interrupted with a black central smudge. In museum specimens, any yellow colour soon fades to brown after death. Like most species in the tribe Eristalini, M. florea is rather variable in size, shape and colour.

== Description ==
For terms see Morphology of Diptera
The species has a wing length of 7–12 mm (0.3–0.5 in). Thorax dorsum with a characteristic "skull" black pattern. Abdomen black with yellow patterning. Legs pale and black. The larvae of the species were described and figured by Graham E. Rotheray in 1993. See references for determination.

== Distribution ==
Myathropa florea is found in the Palearctic from Fennoscandia south to Iberia and the Mediterranean basin, and from Ireland eastwards across Europe and Russia. It has been adventive on the Pacific coast of North America since 2005.

== Biology ==
Feeding on flowers

They occur in deciduous forests, fen carr, farmland with trees, parks, and gardens.

They visit many different species of flowers, including umbellifers, Castanea, Convolvulus, Crataegus, Chaerophyllum, Euonymus, Filipendula, Hedera, Rhododendron, Rubus, Sambucus, Solidago, Sorbus, and Viburnum opulus.

The flight period is May to October. Larvae feed on bacteria in organic waterlogged detritus, often in the shallow rot holes of tree stumps.
