= Kertesziomyia =

Scientific classification
- Kingdom: Animalia
- Phylum: Arthropoda
- Class: Insecta
- Order: Diptera
- Family: Syrphidae
- Tribe: Eristalini
- Subtribe: Eristalina
- Genus: Kertesziomyia; Shiraki 1930

Type species
- Eristalis aeneicinctus Meijere, 1929

Synonyms
- Catacores Hull, 1944; Kertesziomya Neave, 1939; Kertesziomyia Shiraki, 1930; Klossia Curran, 1931; Paramesembrius Shiraki, 1930; Pseuderistalis Shiraki, 1930

Genus of flies

Kertesziomyia is a genus of 14 Hoverflies, from the family Syrphidae, in the order Diptera.

They are very similar to Eristalinus, but Kertesziomyia is defined by having a postalar pile tuft but lacking the pile on posterior portions of the anepimeron and not having patterns on the eyes typical of Eristalinus.

== Species ==
These 25 species belong to the genus Kertesziomyia:

- Kertesziomyia aeneicincta (Meijere, 1929)
- Kertesziomyia aenous (Brunetti, 1907)
- Kertesziomyia albitibiis (Sack, 1926)
- Kertesziomyia bicolor (Shiraki, 1930)
- Kertesziomyia bidentata (Sack, 1926)
- Kertesziomyia calliphoroides Shiraki, 1968
- Kertesziomyia conducta (Walker, 1858)
- Kertesziomyia cyanea (Brunetti, 1913)
- Kertesziomyia distincta (Meijere, 1913)
- Kertesziomyia fascipennis (Thompson, 1975)
- Kertesziomyia formosana (Shiraki, 1930)
- Kertesziomyia fulgens (Macquart, 1850)
- Kertesziomyia marfax (Curran, 1947)
- Kertesziomyia nebulipennis (Meijere, 1914)
- Kertesziomyia neptunus (Meijere, 1911)
- Kertesziomyia nigra (Wiedemann, 1824)
- Kertesziomyia obliterans (Walker, 1860)
- Kertesziomyia penangensis (Curran, 1931)
- Kertesziomyia perakensis (Curran, 1928)
- Kertesziomyia pura (Curran, 1928)
- Kertesziomyia quadrangulum (Meijere, 1916)
- Kertesziomyia semisplendens (Sack, 1926)
- Kertesziomyia velutina (Sack, 1926)
- Kertesziomyia violascens (Kertész, 1913) (temperate Asia)
- Kertesziomyia viridis (Coquillett, 1898)
