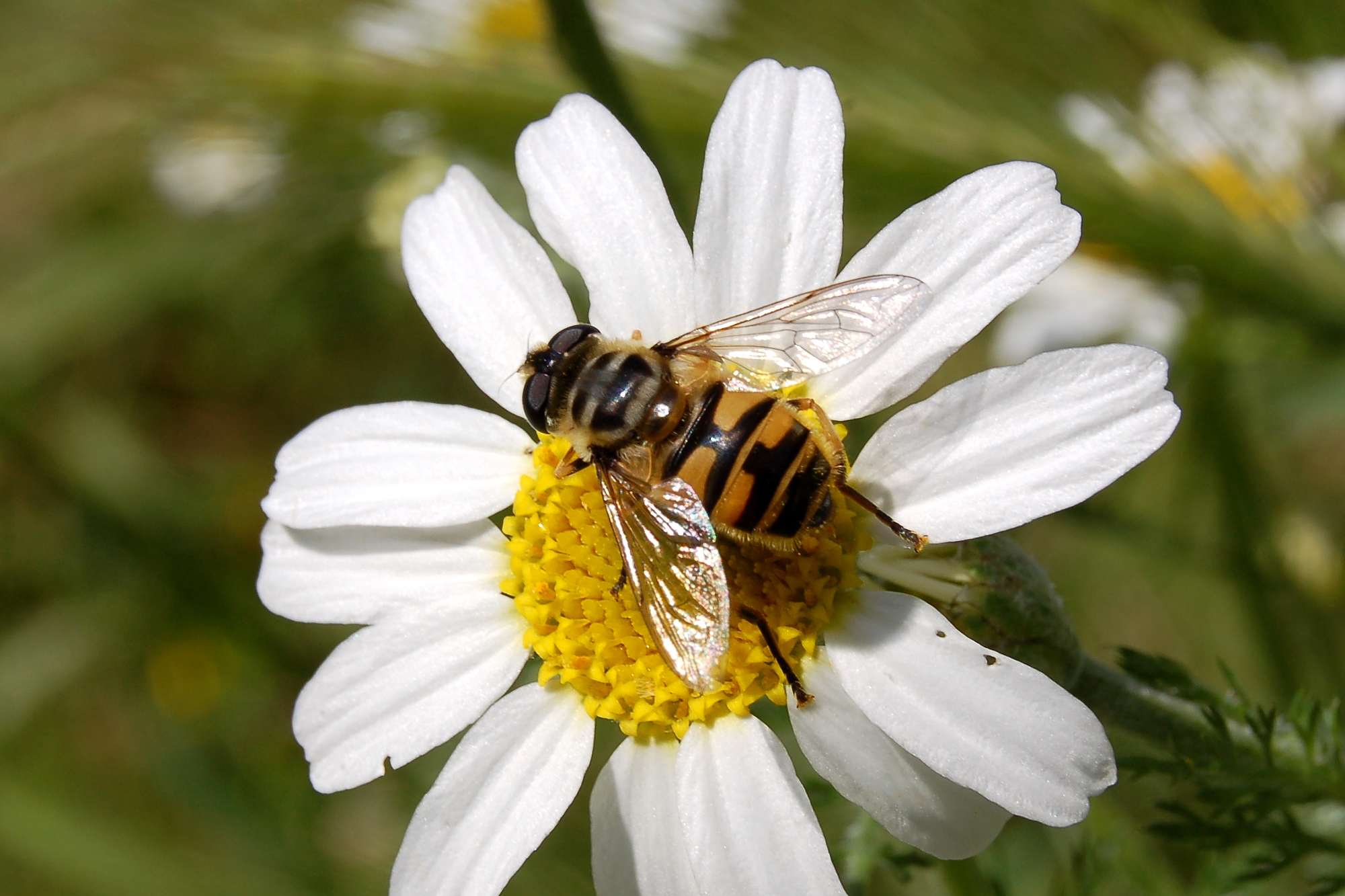
- Myathropa florea female

Scientific classification
- Kingdom: Animalia
- Phylum: Arthropoda
- Class: Insecta
- Order: Diptera
- Family: Syrphidae
- Subfamily: Eristalinae
- Tribe: Eristalini
- Subtribe: Helophilina
- Genus: Myathropa; Rondani, 1845

Type species
- Musca florea Linnaeus, 1758

Synonyms
- Myatropa authors; Myiathropa authors; Myiatropa Verrall, 1882

= Myathropa =

Genus of flies

Myathropa is a European and North African genus of very common hoverfly. Adults may be seen on flowers from May to September. Larvae feed on bacteria in organic waterlogged detritus, often in the shallow rot holes of tree stumps.

== Species ==
- M. florea (Linnaeus, 1758)
- M. semenovi Smirnov, 1925
- M. usta (Wollaston, 1858)
