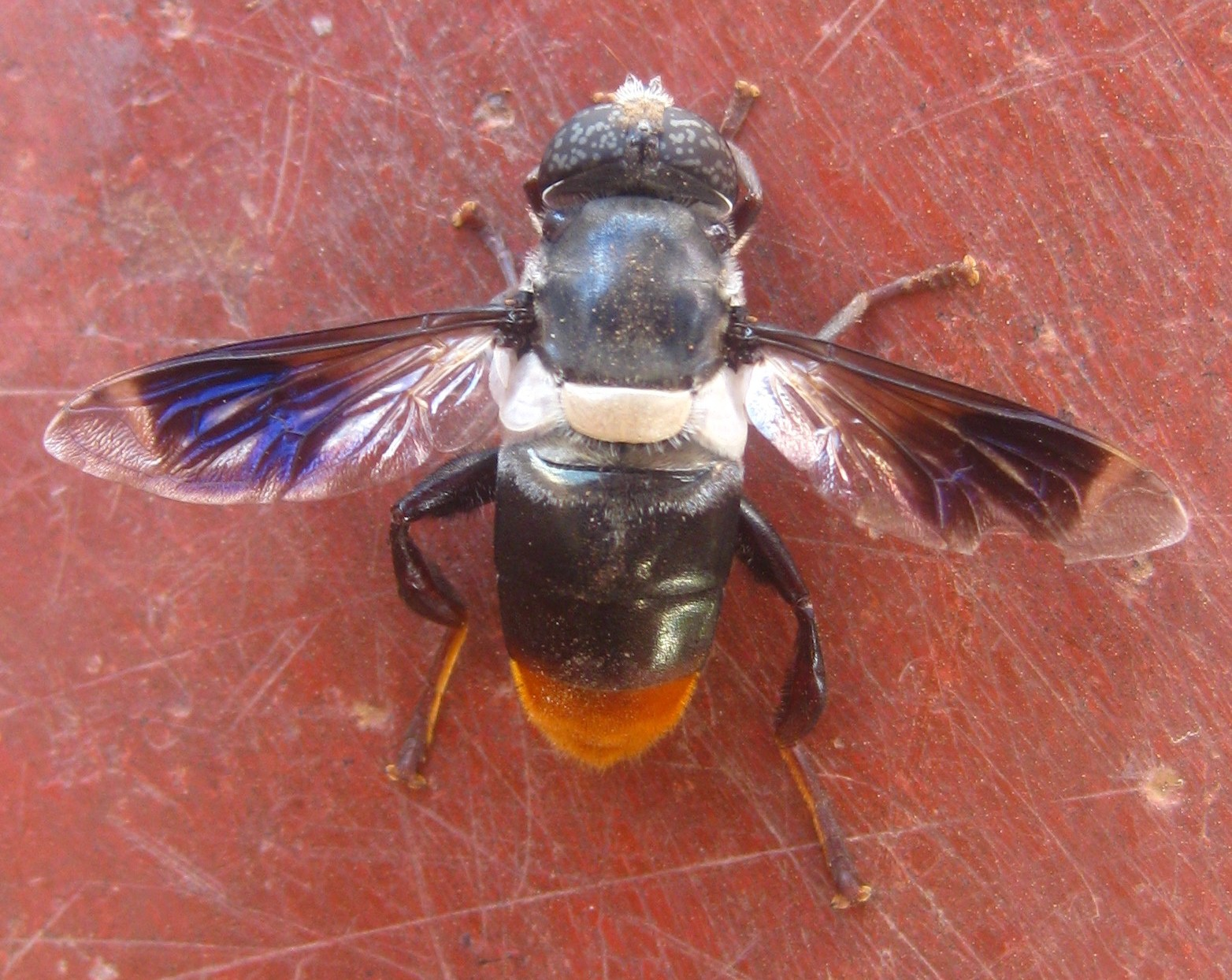
- Senaspis haemorrhoa

Scientific classification
- Kingdom: Animalia
- Phylum: Arthropoda
- Class: Insecta
- Order: Diptera
- Family: Syrphidae
- Subfamily: Eristalinae
- Tribe: Eristalini
- Subtribe: Eristalina
- Genus: Senaspis; Macquart, 1850

Type species
- Senaspis flaviceps

= Senaspis =

Genus of flies

Senaspis is a genus of 14 species of Afrotropical hoverfly from the family Syrphidae, in the order Diptera.

== Species ==
- S. apophysata Bezzi, 1915
- S. cuprea Macquart, 1842
- S. dentipes (Macquart, 1842)
- S. dibapha Walker, 1849
- S. elliotii Austen, 1909
- S. flaviceps Macquart, 1850
- S. griseifacies Bezzi, 1908
- S. haemorrhoa Gerstaecker, 1871
- S. livida (Bezzi, 1912)
- S. melanthysana Speiser, 1913
- S. nigrita Bigot, 1859
- S. pennata (Herve-Bazin, 1914)
- S. umbrifera Walker, 1849
- S. xanthorrhoea Bezzi, 1912
