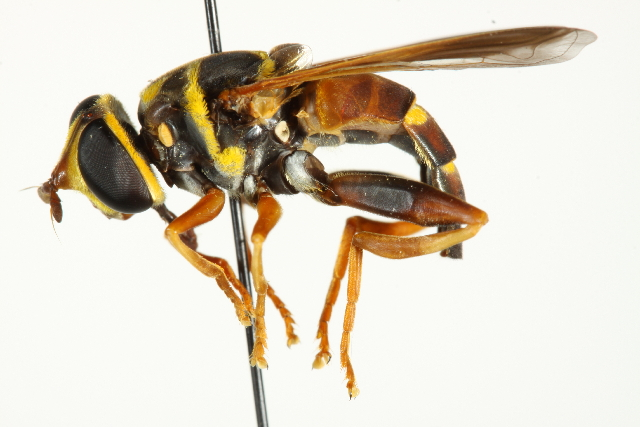

Scientific classification
- Domain: Eukaryota
- Kingdom: Animalia
- Phylum: Arthropoda
- Class: Insecta
- Order: Diptera
- Family: Syrphidae
- Genus: Meromacrus
- Species: M. gloriosus

Binomial name
- Meromacrus gloriosus ( Hull, 1941)

= Meromacrus gloriosus =

Species of syrphid fly

Meromacrus gloriosus, the Glorious Elegant, is a species of syrphid fly in the family Syrphidae. Originally described from Mexico by Frank Hull in 1941 this black and yellow wasp mimic has since been observed in many locations in Texas and New Mexico.

== Description ==
Size
Length 14 mm
Head
The facial stripe and cheeks light orange brown, The pile of the face yellowish, The sides of the face, near the eyes, are a pale yellow. The middle of frons light orange brown covered in white pile while the pile of the vertex is blackish intermixed with yellow. The face sides are golden pollinose. The cheeks, and a facial stripe light orange brown, covered with yellowish pile. The sides of the face are densely pale yellow pubescent The flagellum is blackish above, light orange brown. The arista pale yellow. The tomentum of the occiput sulphur yellow

Thorax
Notum blackish, with yellow spots and stripes. The humeri light brown The mesonotum is marked with sulphur-yellow tomentum as follows : a large, yellow, posterior spot inside the humerus (postpronotoum), a prominent line next to the transverse suture, broadly even width that continues over the posterior margin of the mesopleura. There is another similar fascia just before the scutellum, narrowed near the basal corners of the scutellum and continuous with similar pile on the posterior part of the post calli Scutellum light reddish-brown, subtranslucent with thick short, setaceous black pile and a thin ventral fringe. The prominent yellow line margining the transverse suture continues broadly down over the posterior margin of the mesopleura, there joining a large spot of yellow pile on the upper part of the sternopleura. There is a yellow spot above the anterior spiracle.

Eristalis wing

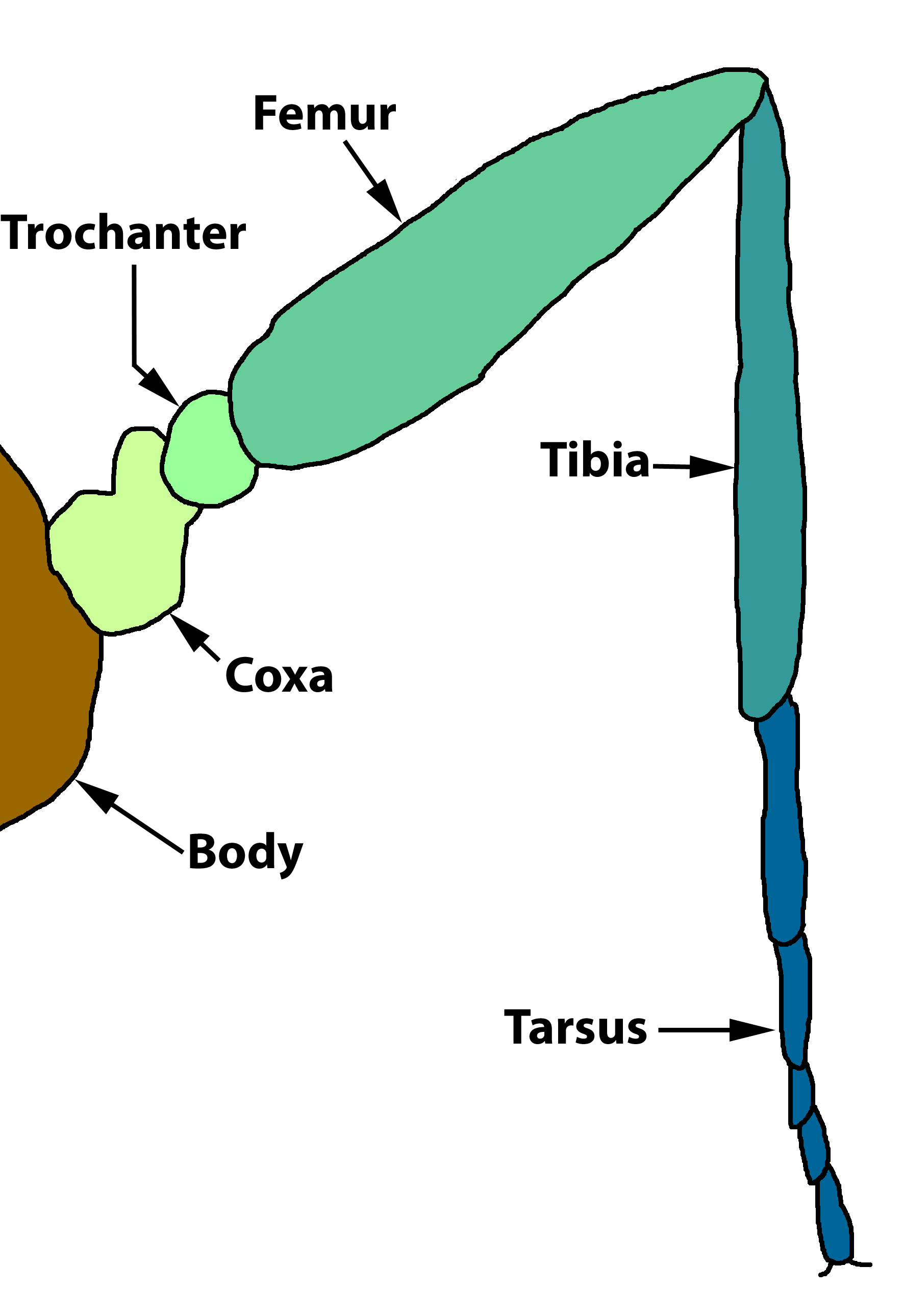
leg

Wings
Basal half of the wings strongly tinged with yellow on the costal, subcostal and basal cell, the distal half of the anterior margin brownish. The sinus above the loop of the third vein (R4+5) is clear. marginal cell and closed petiolate.
Legs
Dorsal part of hind femora reddish or yellow pilose, rarely with a trace of dark pile on hind femora apically and dorsally; sometimes deceptive unless viewed carefully; legs wholly light orange red. Front and middle legs wholly pale yellow and orange red with yellow pile. Hind femur orange brown with a dark brown s mid-dorsal spot with black setae on the posterior ventral area. Hind tibia distinctly curved.

Abdomen
It is chiefly light orange red and black, with the third segment a little darker. The first segment dark brown in the middle with prominent diagonal patches of sulphur-yellow pile, especially upon the posterior borders and narrowly separated in the middle but not extending to the lateral margin. The basal and posterior margins of the second segment are brown. The third segment is brownish-black in the middle, red on the sides with prominent basal, marginal lines of yellow pile not touching in the middle and their posterior margins curved. The fourth segment with similar marks but narrower, much more widely separated but conspicuous semicircular patches of yellow tomentum.
