= Solenaspis =

Scientific classification
- Kingdom: Animalia
- Phylum: Arthropoda
- Class: Insecta
- Order: Diptera
- Family: Syrphidae
- Subfamily: Eristalinae
- Tribe: Eristalini
- Subtribe: Eristalina
- Genus: Solenaspis; Osten-Sacken, 1881
- Species: S. nitens

Binomial name
- Solenaspis nitens (Bigot, 1880)

Synonyms
- Plagiocera nitens Bigot, 1880; Solenaspis beccarii Osten Sacken, 1881

Genus of flies

Solenaspis is a monotypic genus of hoverfly from the family Syrphidae, in the order Diptera. The only species is Solenaspis nitens.
