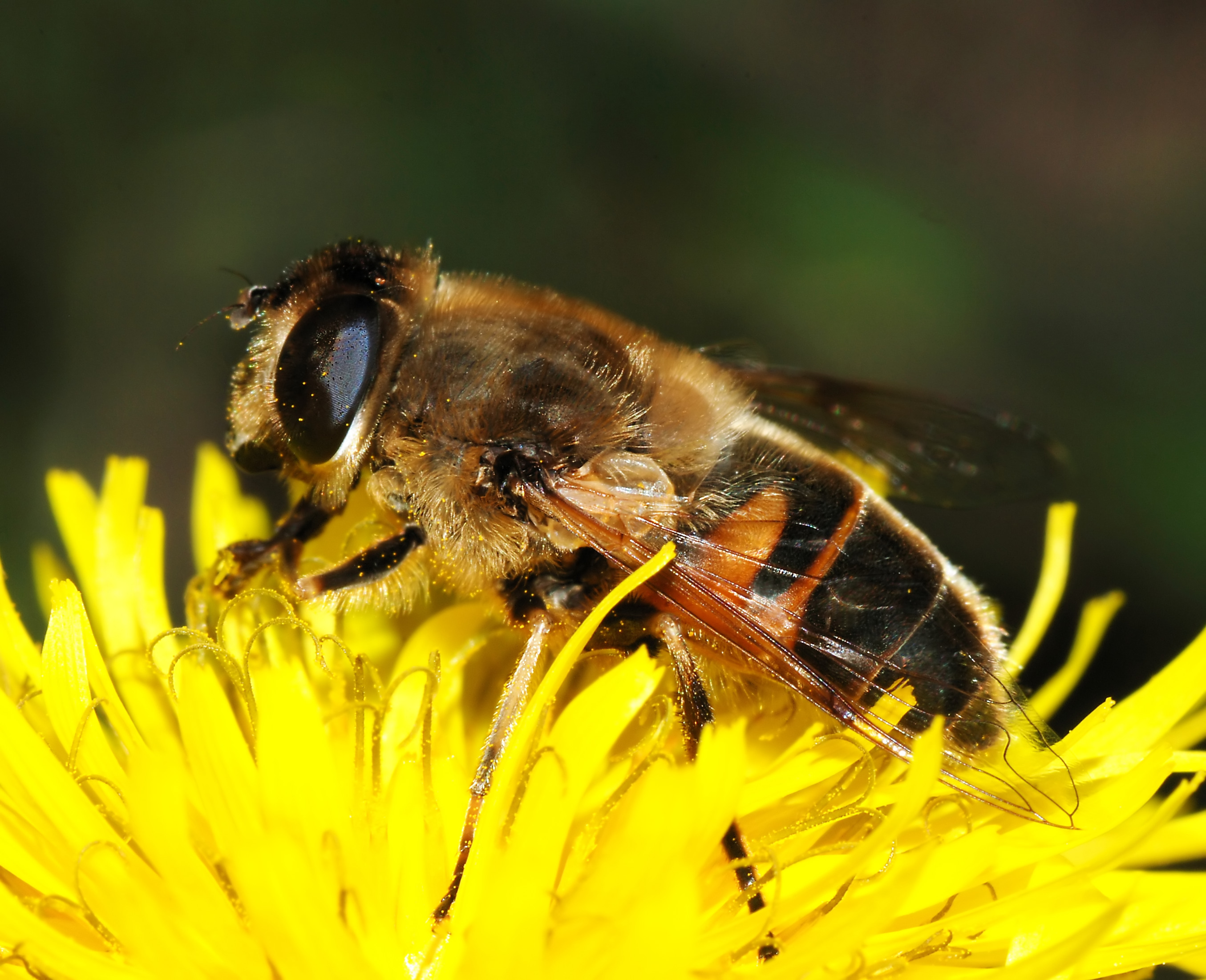
- Eristalis tenax

Scientific classification
- Kingdom: Animalia
- Phylum: Arthropoda
- Class: Insecta
- Order: Diptera
- Family: Syrphidae
- Subfamily: Eristalinae
- Tribe: Eristalini

Subtribes
- Eristalina; Helophilina

= Eristalini =

Tribe of hoverflies

Eristalini is a tribe of hoverflies. Several species are well-known honeybee mimics, such as the drone fly Eristalis tenax, while other genera such as Helophilus and Parhelophilus exhibit wasp-like patterns of yellow and black stripes, both strategies to avoid predation by visual predators such as birds.

They breed in decaying organic materials such as run-offs from dung heaps (Eristalis) or in ponds and ditches (e.g. Anasimyia). Some others, such as Myathropa and Mallota, breed in wet rotting tree stumps and rot holes.

A characteristic feature of this tribe is the "rat-tailed maggot" with a rear positioned telescopic breathing tube, allowing the larvae to breathe while living submerged in water or mud. This feature is also shared with another hoverfly tribe the Sericomyiini though those flies do not share the characteristic eristaline dip in wing vein R4+5.

== List of genera ==
Thompson considers the tribe Sericomyiini a subtribe of the Eristalini while others separate it.

Subtribe: Eristalina

- Austalis Thompson & Vockeroth, 2003
- Axona Walker, 1864
- Digulia Meijere, 1913
- Dissoptera Edwards, 1915
- Eristalinus Rondani, 1845
- Eristalis Latreille, 1804
- Keda Curran, 1931
- Kertesziomyia Shiraki, 1930
- Lycastrirhyncha Bigot, 1859
- Meromacroides Curran, 1927
- Meromacrus Rondani, 1849
- Palpada Macquart, 1834
- Phytomia Guerin-Meneville, 1833
- Senaspis Macquart, 1850
- Simoides Loew, 1858
- Solenaspis Osten Sacken, 1881

Subtribe: Helophilina

- Anasimyia Schiner, 1864
- Austrophilus Thompson, 2000
- Chasmomma Bezzi, 1915
- Dolichogyna Macquart, 1842
- Habromyia Williston, 1888
- Helophilus Meigen, 1822
- Lejops Rondani, 1857
- Mallota Meigen, 1822
- Mesembrius Rondani, 1857
- Myathropa Rondani, 1845
- Ohmyia Thompson, 1999
- Parhelophilus Girschner, 1897
- Quichuana Knab, 1913
