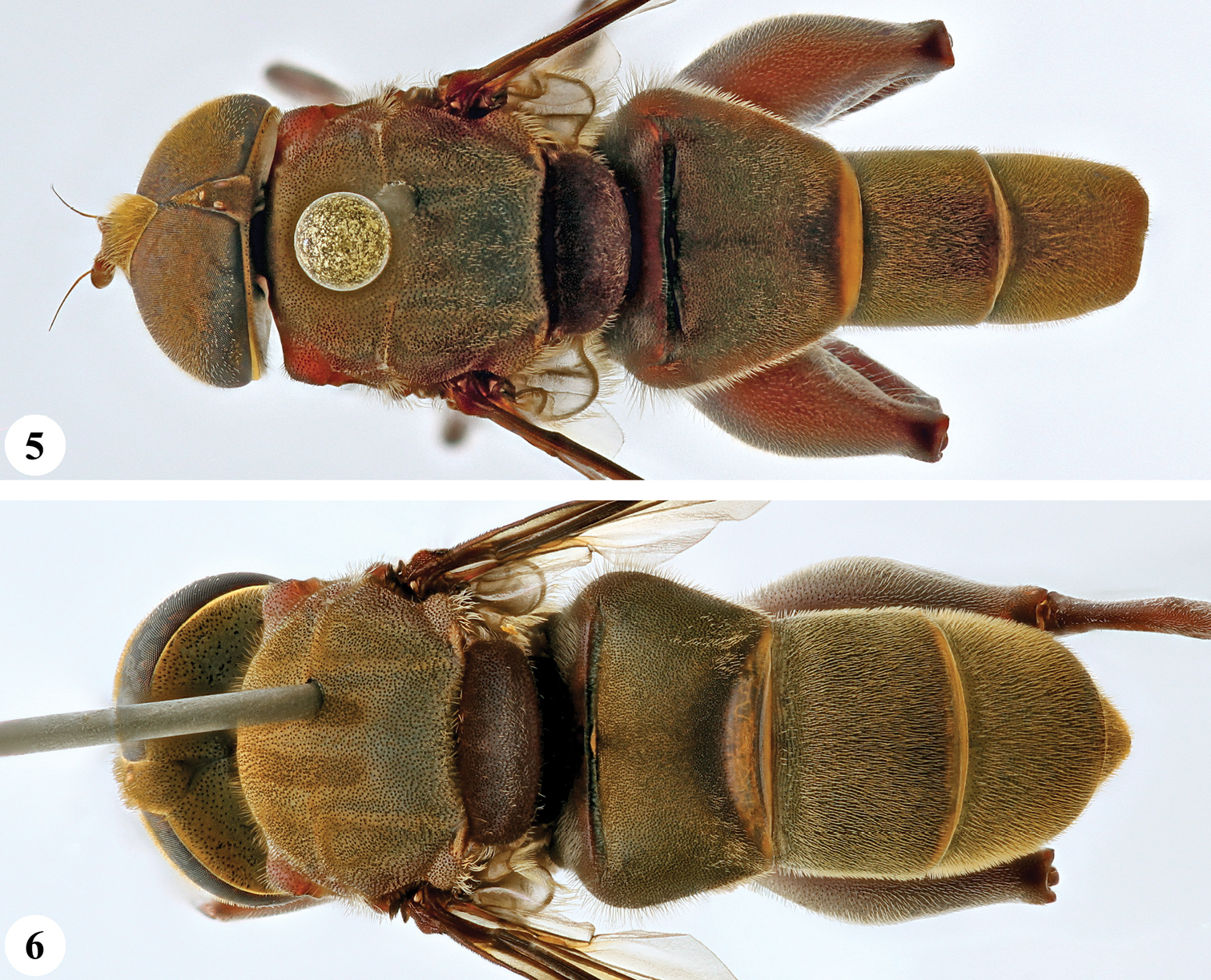

Scientific classification
- Kingdom: Animalia
- Phylum: Arthropoda
- Clade: Pancrustacea
- Class: Insecta
- Order: Diptera
- Family: Syrphidae
- Subfamily: Eristalinae
- Tribe: Eristalini
- Subtribe: Eristalina
- Genus: Meromacroides; Curran, 1927
- Species: M. meromacriformis

Binomial name
- Meromacroides meromacriformis (Bezzi, 1915)

Synonyms
- Eristalis meromacriformis Bezzi, 1915

= Meromacroides =

Genus of flies

Meromacroides is a monotypic genus of Afrotropical hoverfly from the family Syrphidae, in the order Diptera.

== Species ==
- Meromacroides meromacriformis (Bezzi, 1915)
