= Simoides =

Scientific classification
- Kingdom: Animalia
- Phylum: Arthropoda
- Clade: Pancrustacea
- Class: Insecta
- Order: Diptera
- Family: Syrphidae
- Subfamily: Eristalinae
- Tribe: Eristalini
- Subtribe: Eristalina
- Genus: Simoides; Loew, 1857

Type species
- Simoides crassipes (Fabricius, 1805)

Genus of insects

Simoides is a genus of 7 species of Afrotropical hoverflies from the family Syrphidae, in the order Diptera.

== Species ==
- Simoides crassipes (Fabricius, 1805)
- Simoides expletus Loew, 1858
- Simoides flavipila Hull, 1964
- Simoides notatus (Bigot, 1885)
- Simoides villipes Loew, 1858
