= Axona (fly) =

Scientific classification
- Kingdom: Animalia
- Phylum: Arthropoda
- Class: Insecta
- Order: Diptera
- Family: Syrphidae
- Subfamily: Eristalinae
- Tribe: Eristalini
- Subtribe: Eristalina
- Genus: Axona; Walker, 1864

Type species
- Axona chalcopyga Walker, 1864

Genus of flies

Axona is a genus of drone flies in the family Syrphidae. There are at least two described species in Axona, found in Southeast Asia and Australia.

== Species ==
These two species belong to the genus Axona:

- Axona chalcopyga (Wiedemann, 1830)
- Axona kershawi (Ferguson, 1926)
