= Meromacrus draco =

Scientific classification
- Domain: Eukaryota
- Kingdom: Animalia
- Phylum: Arthropoda
- Class: Insecta
- Order: Diptera
- Family: Syrphidae
- Genus: Meromacrus
- Species: M. draco

Binomial name
- Meromacrus draco Hull, 1942

Species of fly

Meromacrus draco is a species of syrphid flies in the family Syrphidae.
