= Keda (fly) =

Scientific classification
- Kingdom: Animalia
- Phylum: Arthropoda
- Class: Insecta
- Order: Diptera
- Family: Syrphidae
- Tribe: Eristalini
- Subtribe: Eristalina
- Genus: Keda; Curran, 1931
- Species: K. conclusa

Binomial name
- Keda conclusa (Walker, 1859)

Genus of flies

Keda is a genus of rat-tail maggot flies in the family Syrphidae. This genus has a single species, Keda conclusa. It is found in Southeast Asia, including New Guinea.
