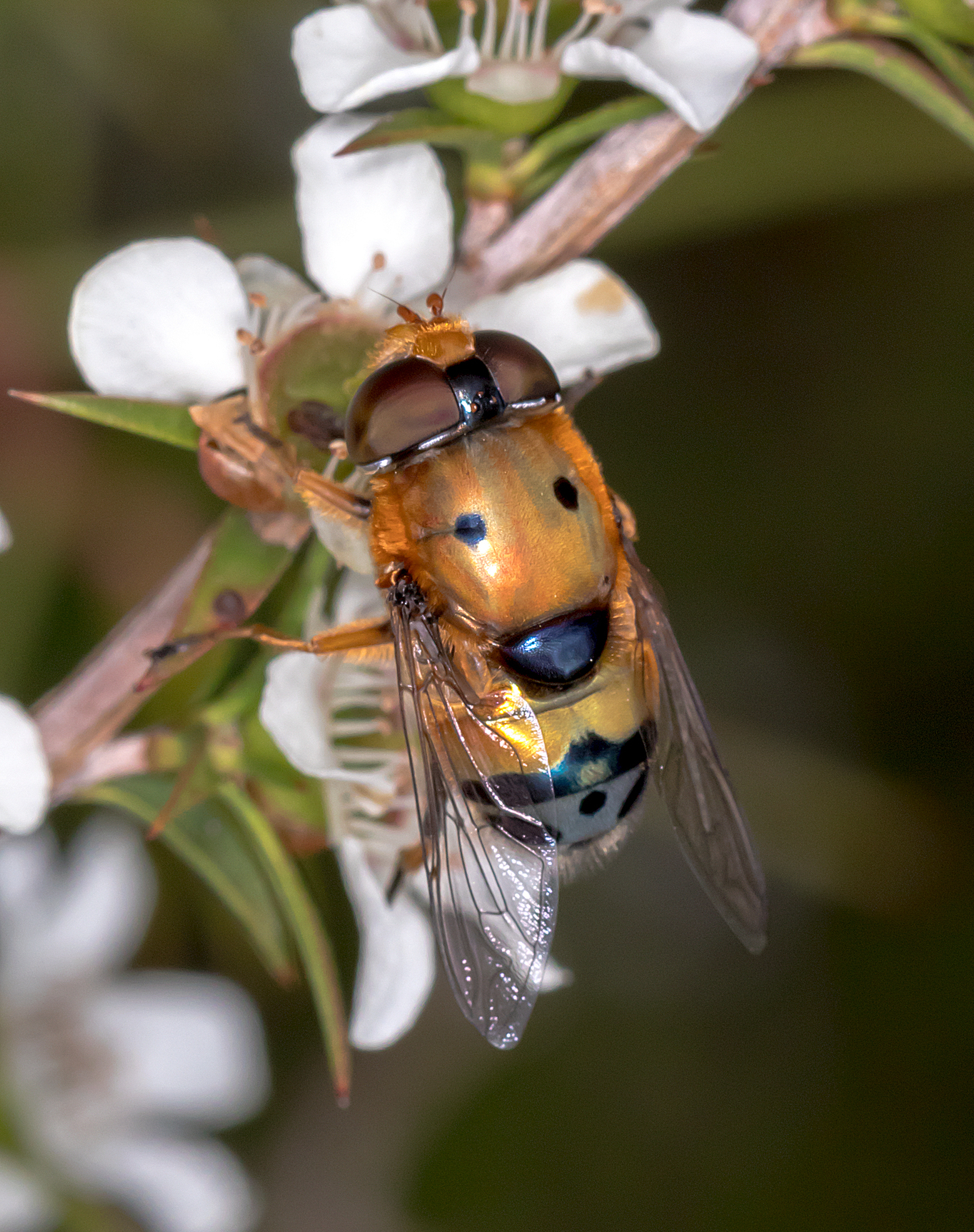
- Austalis pulchella

Scientific classification
- Kingdom: Animalia
- Phylum: Arthropoda
- Class: Insecta
- Order: Diptera
- Family: Syrphidae
- Subfamily: Eristalinae
- Tribe: Eristalini
- Subtribe: Eristalina
- Genus: Austalis; Thompson & Vockeroth, 2003

Type species
- Eristalis resolutus Walker, 1858

= Austalis =

Genus of flies

Austalis is a genus of hoverflies, from the family Syrphidae, in the order Diptera.

Formerly members of this genus were considered part of Eristalis though as rather a distinct group. They are very similar to Eristalinus, but Austalis is defined by having a postalar pile tuft but lacking the pile on posterior portions of the anepimeron and lacking the patterning on the eyes typical of Eristalinus. They also share a distinct metallic colouring. Little is known of their life histories but the adults have been recorded feeding at Eucalyptus flowers.

== Systematics ==
List created by Thompson (2003) in defining the new genus.

- A. aequipars (Walker, 1864)
- A. bergi (Curran, 1947)
- A. caledonica (Bigot, 1884)
- A. calliphoroides (Shiraki, 1963)
- A. ciliata (Meijere, 1913)
- A. conjuncta (Ferguson, 1926)
- A. copiosa (Walker, 1852)
- A. cupreoides (Goot, 1964)
- A. erythropyga (Walker, 1864)
- A. inscripta (Doleschall, 1857)
- A. latilimbata (Meijere, 1913)
- A. lucilioides (Walker, 1861)
- A. luciliomima (Hull, 1944)
- A. muscoides (Walker, 1858)
- A. muscomima (Hull, 1944)
- A. postscripta (Walker, 1864)
- A. pulchella (Macquart, 1846)
- A. refulgens (Doleschall, 1858)
- A. resoluta (Walker, 1858)
- A. rhina Thompson, 2003
- A. rhynchops (Bezzi, 1928)
- A. roederi (Bergroth, 1894)
- A. smaradgi (Walker, 1849)
- A. triseriata (Meijere, 1913)

A further dozen species are known from the Oriental and Australasian regions but await formal description.
