= Dissoptera =

Scientific classification
- Kingdom: Animalia
- Phylum: Arthropoda
- Clade: Pancrustacea
- Class: Insecta
- Order: Diptera
- Family: Syrphidae
- Subfamily: Eristalinae
- Tribe: Eristalini
- Subtribe: Eristalina
- Genus: Dissoptera; Edwards, 1915

Synonyms
- Xenozoon Hull, 1949

Genus of flies

Dissoptera is a genus of hoverflies, insects in the family Syrphidae, in the order Diptera. It consists of seven species distributed through the Australasian and Oriental regions.

== Species ==
- Dissoptera clarkei Shiraki, 1963
- Dissoptera gressitti Shiraki, 1963
- Dissoptera heterothrix (Meijere, 1908)
- Dissoptera maritima Hull, 1929
- Dissoptera palauensis Shiraki, 1963
- Dissoptera unicolor Bezzi, 1928
- Dissoptera yapensis Shiraki, 1963
