= Digulia =

Scientific classification
- Kingdom: Animalia
- Phylum: Arthropoda
- Class: Insecta
- Order: Diptera
- Family: Syrphidae
- Subfamily: Eristalinae
- Tribe: Eristalini
- Subtribe: Eristalina
- Genus: Digulia; Meijere, 1913
- Species: D. kochi

Binomial name
- Digulia kochi Meijere, 1913

Genus of flies

Digulia is a monotypic genus of hoverfly from the family Syrphidae, in the order Diptera. The single species, Digulia kochi, is found in New Guinea.
