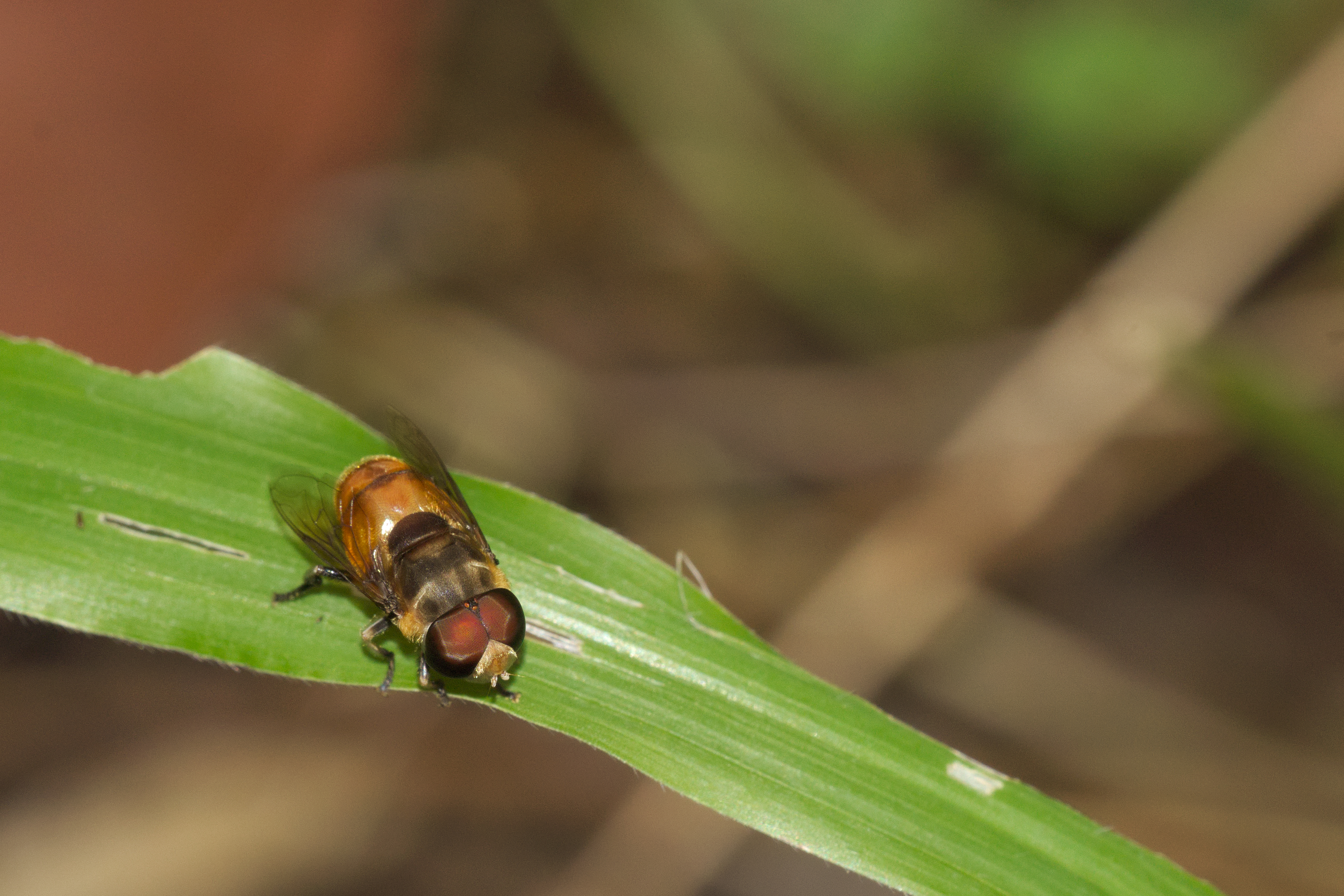
- Phytomia sp.

Scientific classification
- Kingdom: Animalia
- Phylum: Arthropoda
- Class: Insecta
- Order: Diptera
- Family: Syrphidae
- Subfamily: Eristalinae
- Tribe: Eristalini
- Subtribe: Eristalina
- Genus: Phytomia; Guerin-Meneville, 1833

Type species
- Eristalis chrysopygus Wiedemann, 1819

= Phytomia =

Genus of flies

Phytomia is a genus of at least 27 species of hoverflies from the family Syrphidae, in the order Diptera found in tropical Africa and Asia.

== Species ==
- P. aesymnus (Walker, 1849)
- P. argyrocephala (Macquart, 1842)
- P. aurigera Bezzi, 1915
- P. bezzii Curran, 1927
- P. bullata (Loew, 1858)
- P. bulligera (Austen, 1909)
- P. chrysopyga (Wiedemann, 1819)
- P. crassa (Fabricius, 1787)
- P. curta (Loew, 1858)
- P. ephippium Bezzi, 1912
- P. erratica (Bezzi, 1912)
- P. errans Fabricius, 1787
- P. fronto (Loew, 1858)
- P. fucoides Bezzi, 1915
- P. fusca Hull, 1941
- P. incisa (Wiedemann, 1830)
- P. kroeberi Bezzi, 1915
- P. natalensis (Macquart, 1849)
- P. neavei Bezzi, 1915
- P. noctilio Speiser, 1924
- P. poensis Bezzi, 1912
- P. pubipennis Bezzi, 1915
- P. serena Curran, 1927
- P. tenebrica Edwards, 1919
- P. varians Curran, 1927
- P. villipes (Loew, 1858)
- P. zonata (Fabricius, 1787) (Giant Hoverfly)

== Gallery ==
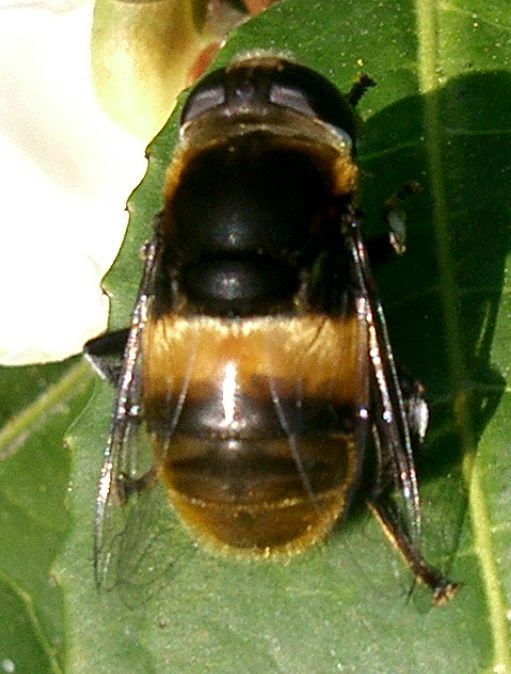
Phytomia zonata

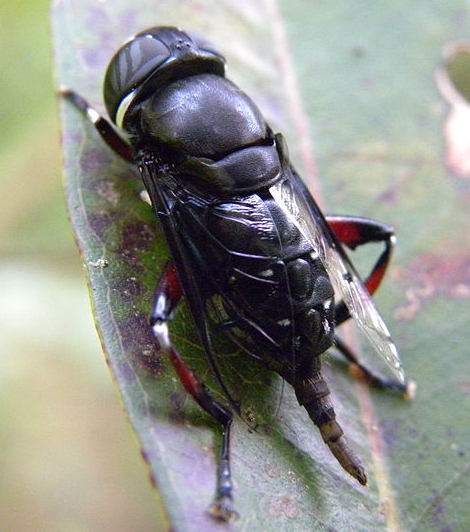
Phytomyia cf. crassa
