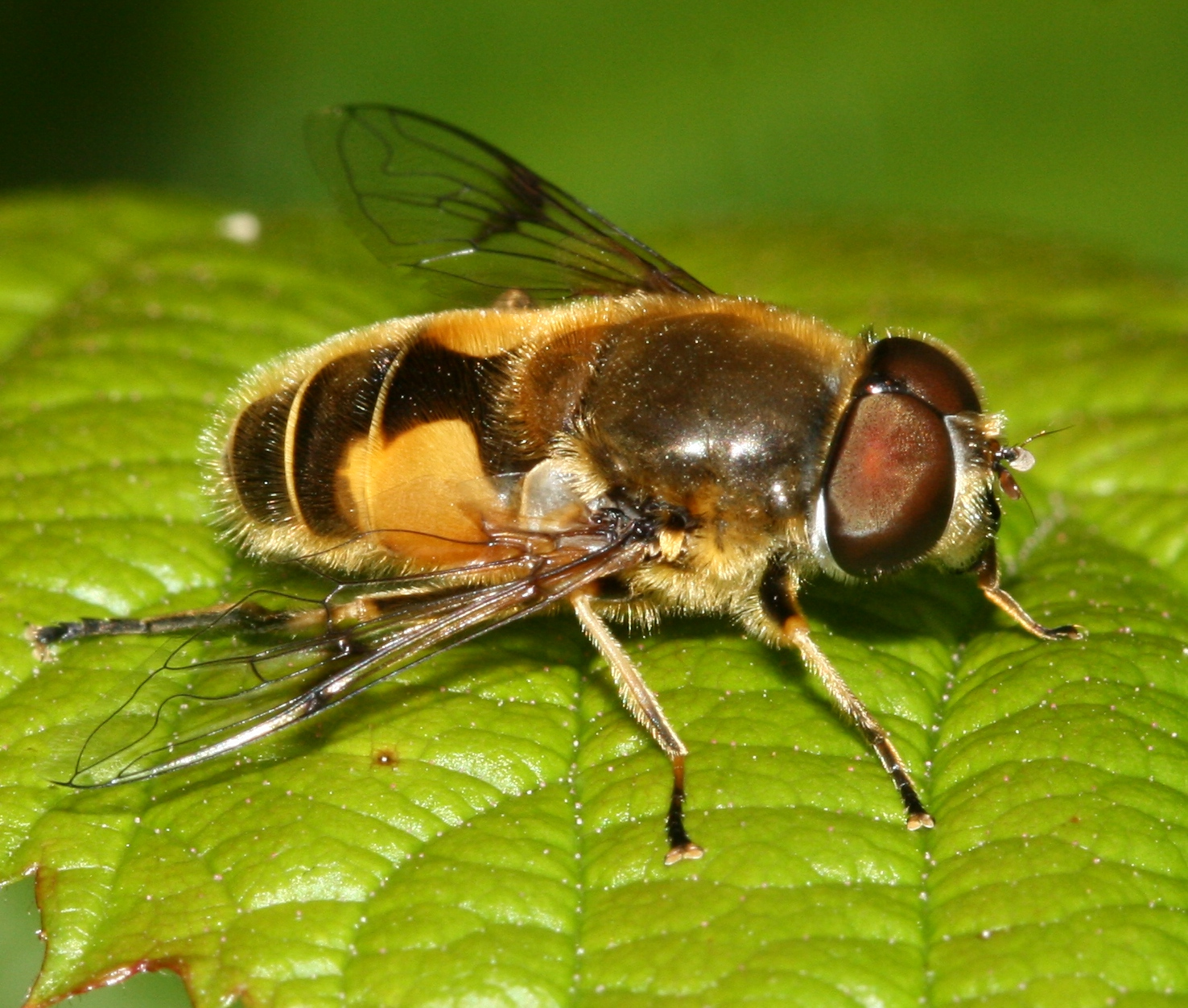
- Eristalis horticola

Scientific classification
- Kingdom: Animalia
- Phylum: Arthropoda
- Class: Insecta
- Order: Diptera
- Family: Syrphidae
- Subfamily: Eristalinae
- Tribe: Eristalini
- Subtribe: Eristalina

Genera
- Austalis Thompson & Vockeroth, 2003; Axona Walker, 1864; Digulia Meijere, 1913; Dissoptera Edwards, 1915; Eristalinus Rondani, 1845; Eristalis Latreille, 1804; Keda Curran, 1931; Kertesziomyia Shiraki, 1930; Lycastrirhyncha Bigot, 1859; Meromacroides Curran, 1927; Meromacrus Rondani, 1849; Palpada Macquart, 1834; Phytomia Guerin-Meneville, 1833; Senaspis Macquart, 1850; Simoides Loew, 1858; Solenaspis Osten Sacken, 1881

= Eristalina =

Subtribe of hoverflies

Eristalina is a subtribe of hoverflies with 17 genera. Several species are well-known bee mimics, such as the drone fly (Eristalis tenax). The larvae live in aquatic and moist organic material, often with low oxygen levels using a posterior breathing tube, thus the common name—the "rat-tailed maggot".
