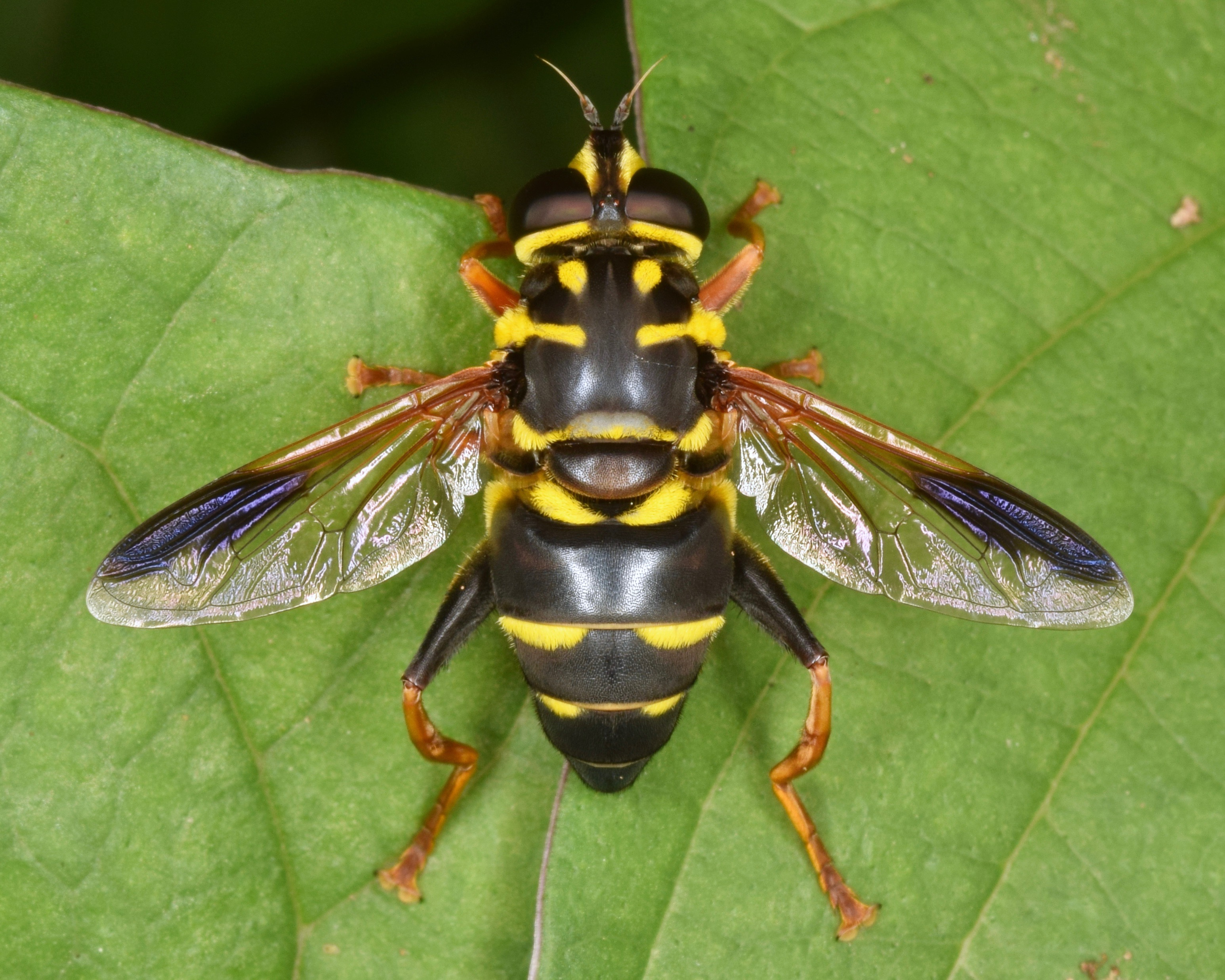
- Meromacrus acutus

Scientific classification
- Kingdom: Animalia
- Phylum: Arthropoda
- Class: Insecta
- Order: Diptera
- Family: Syrphidae
- Subfamily: Eristalinae
- Tribe: Eristalini
- Subtribe: Eristalina
- Genus: Meromacrus; Rondani, 1848

Type species
- Meromacrus ghilianii Rondani, 1848

= Meromacrus =

Genus of flies

Meromacrus is a genus of 43 neotropical and nearctic flower flies or hoverflies

== Species ==
- M. abdominalis Sack, 1920
- M. acutus (Fabricius, 1805)
- M. aemulus (Williston, 1888)
- M. anna Curran, 1936
- M. auriferus Hull, 1942
- M. basigera (Walker, 1860)
- M. bruneri Curran, 1936
- M. brunneus Hull, 1942
- M. canusium (Walker, 1849)
- M. ceres Hull, 1942
- M. circumdatus (Bigot, 1875)
- M. croceatus Hull, 1960
- M. currani Hull, 1942
- M. decorus (Loew, 1866)
- M. draco Hull, 1942
- M. farri Thompson, 1981
- M. flavolinea Hull, 1949
- M. fucatus Hull, 1930
- M. ghilianii Rondani, 1848
- M. gloriosus Hull, 1941
- M. hinei Hull, 1942
- M. laconicus (Walker, 1852)
- M. lineascripta Hull, 1937
- M. matilda Hull, 1949
- M. melansoni Blatch, 2003
- M. melmoth Hull, 1937
- M. milesia Hull, 1942
- M. minuticornis Thompson, 2001
- M. nectarinoides (Lynch Arribalzaga, 1892)
- M. niger Sack, 1920
- M. obscurus Hine, 1924
- M. pachypus (Wiedemann, 1830)
- M. panamensis Curran, 1930
- M. pinguis (Fabricius, 1775)
- M. pinguius (Fabricius, 1773)
- M. pluto Hull, 1942
- M. pratorum (Fabricius, 1775)
- M. ruficrus (Wiedemann, 1830)
- M. scitus (Walker, 1857)
- M. strigulus Hull, 1942
- M. unicolor (Wulp, 1882)
- M. villosus Hull, 1949
- M. zonatus (Loew, 1866)
