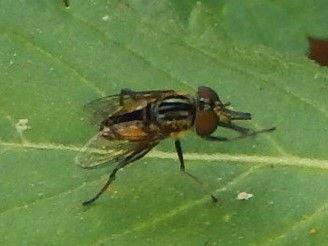
- Lycastrirhyncha nitens

Scientific classification
- Kingdom: Animalia
- Phylum: Arthropoda
- Class: Insecta
- Order: Diptera
- Family: Syrphidae
- Subtribe: Eristalina
- Genus: Lycastrirhyncha; Bigot, 1859

Type species
- Lycastrirhyncha nitens Bigot, 1859

Synonyms
- Licastrirhyncha Williston, 1908; Lycastrirrhyncha Curran, 1934

= Lycastrirhyncha =

Genus of flies

Lycastrirhyncha is a genus of neotropical flower flies or hoverflies.

== Species ==
- L. mexicana Curran, 1930e
- L. nitens Bigot, 1859 – type species.
- L. quinta Doesburg, 1963
- L. titillans Hull, 1944
- L. willistonii Coquillett, 1902
