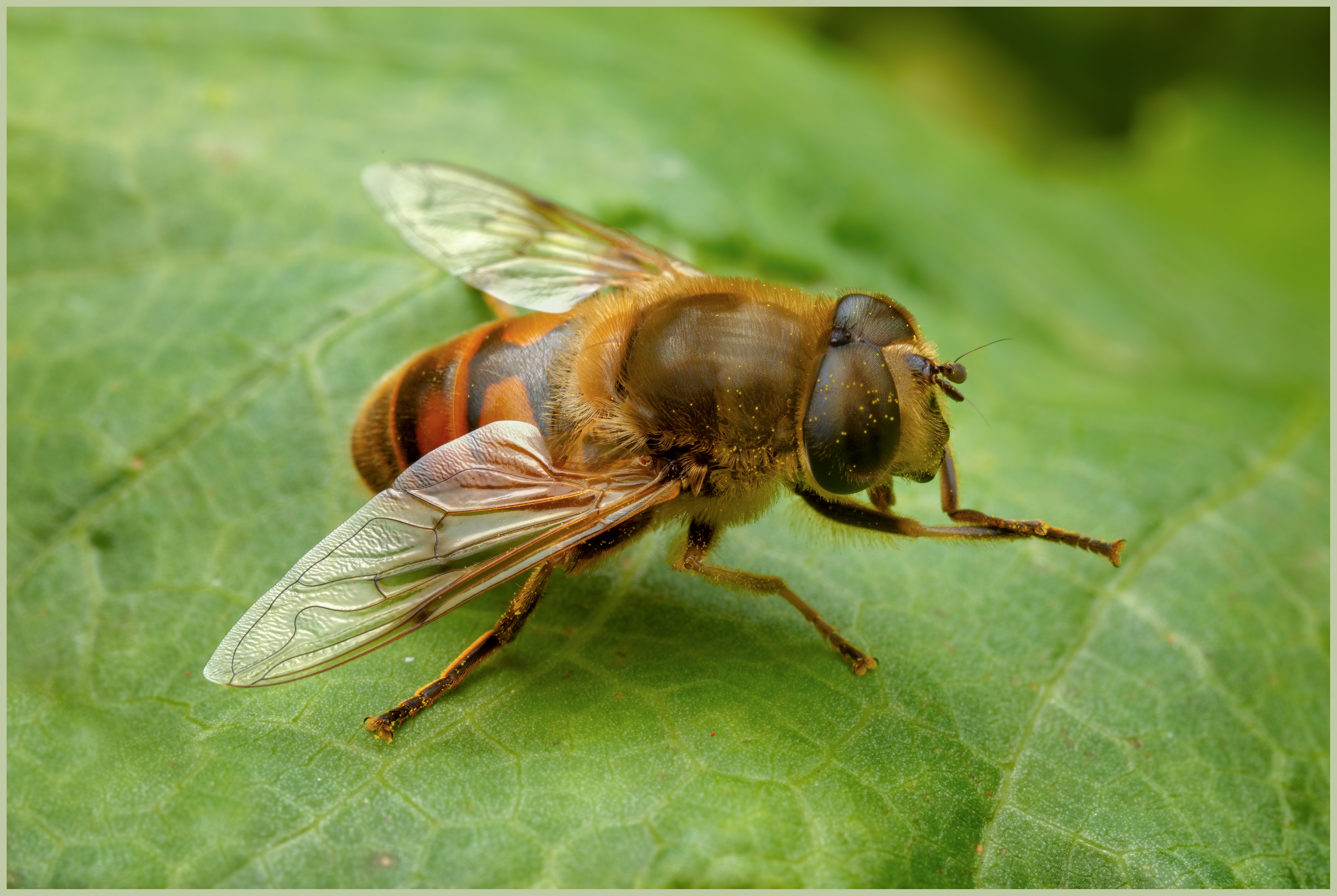
- Male
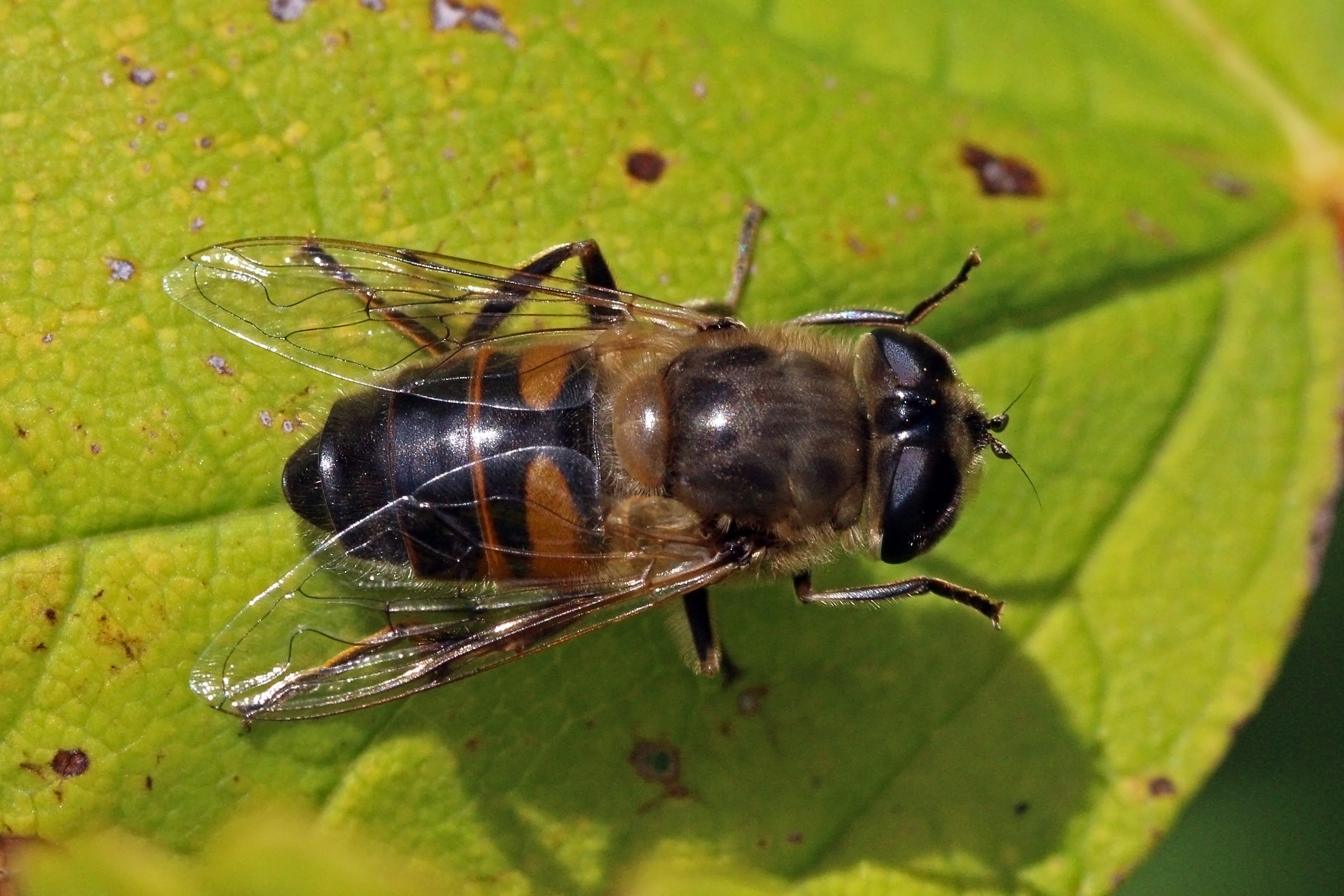
- Female

Scientific classification
- Kingdom: Animalia
- Phylum: Arthropoda
- Clade: Pancrustacea
- Class: Insecta
- Order: Diptera
- Family: Syrphidae
- Genus: Eristalis
- Species: E. tenax

Binomial name
- Eristalis tenax (Linnaeus, 1758)

Synonyms
- Eristalis campestris Meigen, 1822; Musca tenax Linnaeus, 1758

= Eristalis tenax =

Species of fly

Eristalis tenax, the common drone fly, is a common, migratory, cosmopolitan species of hover fly. It is the most widely distributed syrphid species in the world, and is known from all regions except the Antarctic. It has been introduced into North America and is widely established. It can be found in gardens and fields in Europe and Australia. It has also been found in the Himalayas.

== Distribution ==
The larval form of the drone-fly, the rat-tailed maggot, is found on every continent except Antarctica, and ranges to the highest latitudes in the North. This species is not prevalent in extremely southern latitudes, neither is it common in arid areas of Europe, Asia, and Africa. In the United States, this species is found as far north as Alaska and as far south as California and Florida.

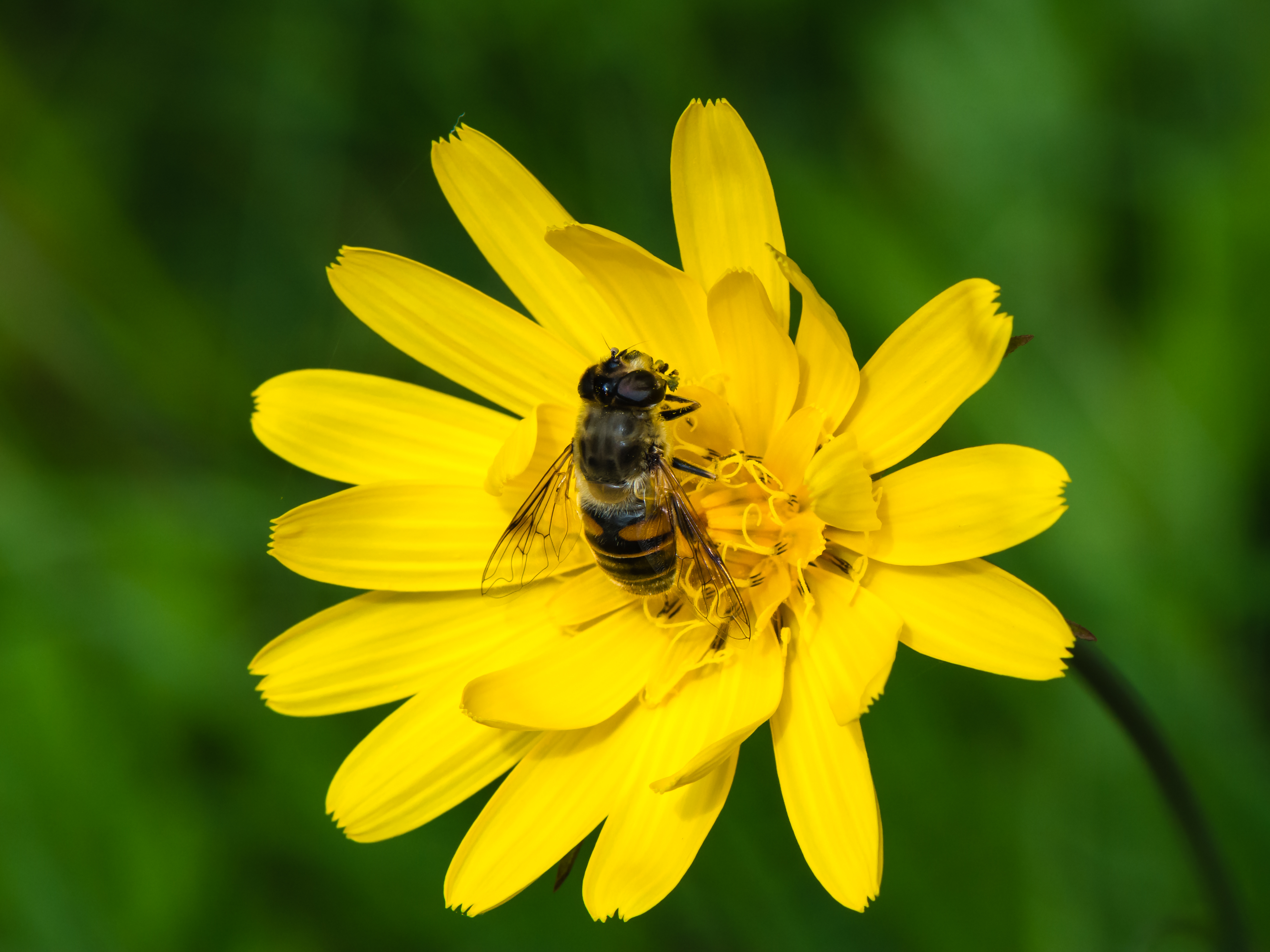
Drone fly on meadow salsify (Tragopogon pratensis)

== Description ==
Eristalis tenax is a large, stocky bee mimic. The eyes are marbled in black. Males have hovering displays. The average wing length is 9.75–13 mm and their average wingspan is 15 mm.

The exact appearance of the drone fly can vary considerably. The abdomen can vary in color from dark brown to orange. Pigmentation has an important role in the control of body temperature; the black areas down the center of the drone-flies abdomen may absorb solar radiation and so warm the dorsal blood vessel, which is right underneath. Despite their variation, the orange-to-brown spots on their second abdominal segment are often more rounded than that of other drone flies. Their hind tibiae are all black or brown and thickened medially. Additionally, the setae immediately above the base of the antennae are dark.

== Territoriality ==
Males of E. tenax can be strongly territorial in the summer, guarding territories such as flowerbeds or bushes to ensure a chance to mate. The males hover motionless in the air and dart after intruders to chase them out of the territory.

Research suggest that male drone flies live in the same territory their entire lives. They mate, feed, and groom in this area, and they defend the area against other insects. When male E. tenax of the spring and summer generations stop dispersing, they settle within home ranges which provide them with locations suitable for sheltering, resting, basking, grooming, feeding and mating. When away from its "home territory", a male drone fly rarely responds to other insects. But when it is on its mating site, the male is very territorial, attacking alien species such as bees, wasps, and butterflies. Being on territorial guard duty is very demanding, so much so that the males take rest periods outside of their territory. When weather conditions do not allow them to leave their territory, they become increasingly aggressive. Males that live in horizontal territories such as flowerbeds are more likely to notice intruders, and so are more likely to attack intruders than males who live in more vertically-aligned territories such as shrubs.

== Life cycle ==
=== Egg ===
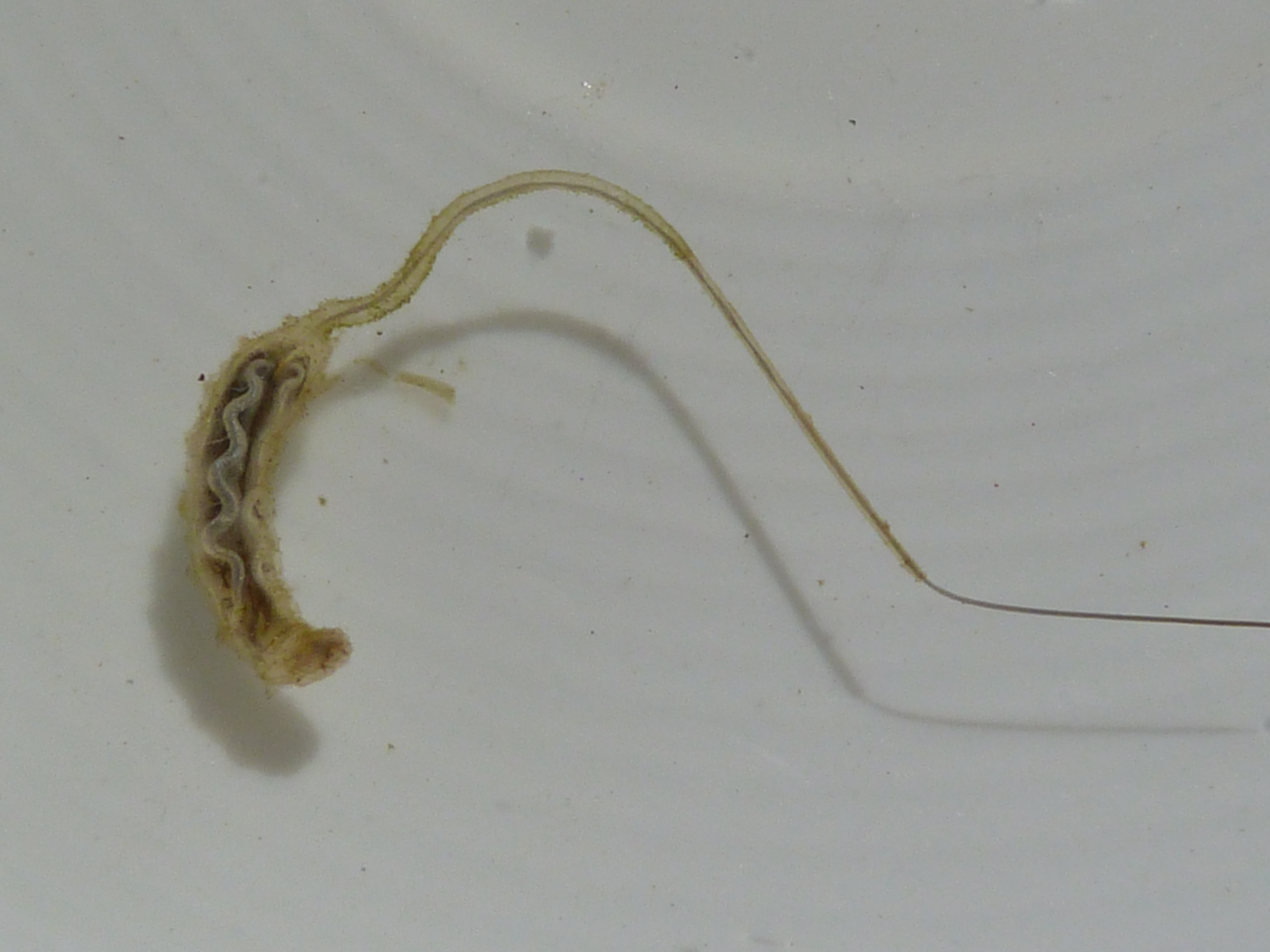
Rat-tailed maggot

The egg is white. It is covered in a sticky substance, and it has an elongated shape.

=== Larva ===
The larva is aquatic. It has a cylindrical shape with patches of horizontal folds that divide the body into segments. At each of the segments, two rows of flexible hairs are visible. All drone-fly larvae have a siphon on their posterior end that acts as a respiratory mechanism and looks like a tail, hence the common name, rat-tail maggot. The siphon can be several times the length of the larva's body.

=== Pupa ===
The pupal stage is very similar to the larva stage but shorter and thicker. Unlike the larval stage, the pupa have two pairs of cornua (horn-like bumps) on their thorax. The siphon is still present, but is locked in a curved position over the back.

=== Adult ===
A female common drone fly on Zinnia. A portion shown in close-up played at one-tenth place.

The adult fly is about 15 mm (6/10 of an inch) in length. Although it superficially resembles a honey bee, it can be easily differentiated from a honey bees because it does not have a constricted "waist" between the thorax and the abdomen. Also, being a fly, it only has two wings whereas bees have four wings. There are short brownish-yellow hairs on the thorax and the first segment of the abdomen. The adult drone-fly's body is dark brown to black in color, with yellow-orange marks on the side of the second section of the abdomen. There is a yellow-orange band that crosses the 3rd abdominal segment.

=== Sexual dimorphism ===
There is sexual dimorphism in drone flies: males tend to have lighter patterns than females. Males can also be easily distinguished from females by their large eyes which almost touch each other, whereas females have smaller eyes that are spaced further apart.

== Biology ==
The larva of E. tenax is a rat-tailed maggot, which is saprophagous. It lives in drainage ditches, pools around manure piles, sewage, and similar places where water is polluted with organic matter. The larvae likely feed on the abundant bacteria living in these places.

When fully grown, the larvae creep out into drier habitats, and seek a suitable place to pupate. In doing so, they sometimes enter buildings, especially barns and basements of farm houses. The pupae are typically 10–12 mm long, grey-brown, oval, and retain the long tail; they look like a tiny mouse.

The adult fly that emerges from the pupa is harmless. It looks somewhat like a drone honey bee, and likely gains some degree of protection from this resemblance to a stinging insect. The adults are called drone flies because of this resemblance. In its natural habitat, E. tenax is more of a curiosity than a problem. Like other hover flies, they are common visitors to flowers, especially in late summer and autumn, and can be significant pollinators. They often feed on the flowers of carrot and fennel.

Under extremely rare conditions, there have been documented cases of human intestinal myiasis of the rat-tailed maggot (larva of Eristalis tenax). Zumpt proposed a hypothesis called "rectal myiasis". During open defecation in the wilderness, flies attracted to feces may deposit their eggs or larvae near or into the anus, and the larvae then penetrate further into the rectum. The larva can survive, feeding on feces at this site, as long as the breathing tube reaches out from the anus, which is quite rare.

=== Myiasis ===
The common drone fly is reported to have caused accidental myiasis. This occurs when fly larvae inhabits a living host by accident, usually from ingestion of contaminated foods. In humans, myiasis can be caused in four ways: intestinal or gastric, nasal, auricular, or anal. The gastric or intestinal kinds are the most common. Most reported myaisis has been reported in countries where nutritional and sanitary conditions are substandard. There are a very few reports of intestinal infestation from India, and Africa. Clinically the symptoms are variable, including cases that are asymptomatic, but usually abdominal pain, nausea and vomiting are symptoms. Myaisis becomes apparent to the host when they notice the larvae in their bowel movements.

The fact that dronefly larvae are able to survive gastric acids may perhaps be due to the fact that they are adapted to living in polluted environments.

== Life cycle ==
The eggs are normally laid on surface water and go through three distinct larval stages. The larvae are usually found in still or stagnant water, like water reservoirs or liquid dung. Just before the pupation stage, the larvae leave their aquatic environment.

=== Life cycle stages ===
There are still many gaps in the understanding of the drone fly life cycle, and more detailed research is needed.

==== Eggs ====
The eggs are deposited near the surface of foul water or decaying organic material. The eggs are laid side by side, perpendicular to the ground. It is still unknown how long it takes for the eggs to hatch.

==== Larvae ====
The larvae are aquatic, but there must be enough solid food for the larva to complete development. This is why they are found in water with high levels of organic matter. The siphon on the back of the larvae remains at the surface of the water while the larva moves throughout the water. This allows for the larva to search for food without having to go to the surface to breathe. It has been reported that the larvae can reproduce by neoteny or paedogenesis, where the larva copies itself. There has only been one observation of this happening.

==== Pupae ====
Pupation happens in a drier location than where the larvae develop. It usually happens below the soil surface, where they remain for eight to 10 days. The cornua that appear on the pupa are believed to help respiration because the siphon becomes unusable.

==== Adults ====
Females feed on pollen after they emerge from the pupa and that way they are able to get the nutrients they need to complete reproduction. Their next few meals will consist of nectar from daisies, chrysanthemums, and asters.

=== Toughness ===
The toughness and resilience of E. tenax increases with age; the skin is insoluble even in strong alkaline solutions. There have been reports of decapitated drone-flies living for three days and nights on the stage of a microscope. With its abdomen removed, an adult drone-fly buzzed for more than an hour. The thorax can be sliced open for examination, and the muscular bundles inside may still twitch when an irritant or needle-point is used. Removing the wings seems to produce very little inconvenience to the fly, when put on a flower the fly without wings immediately plunged its proboscis into the center of the flower, and continued to feed for several minutes.

== Reproduction ==
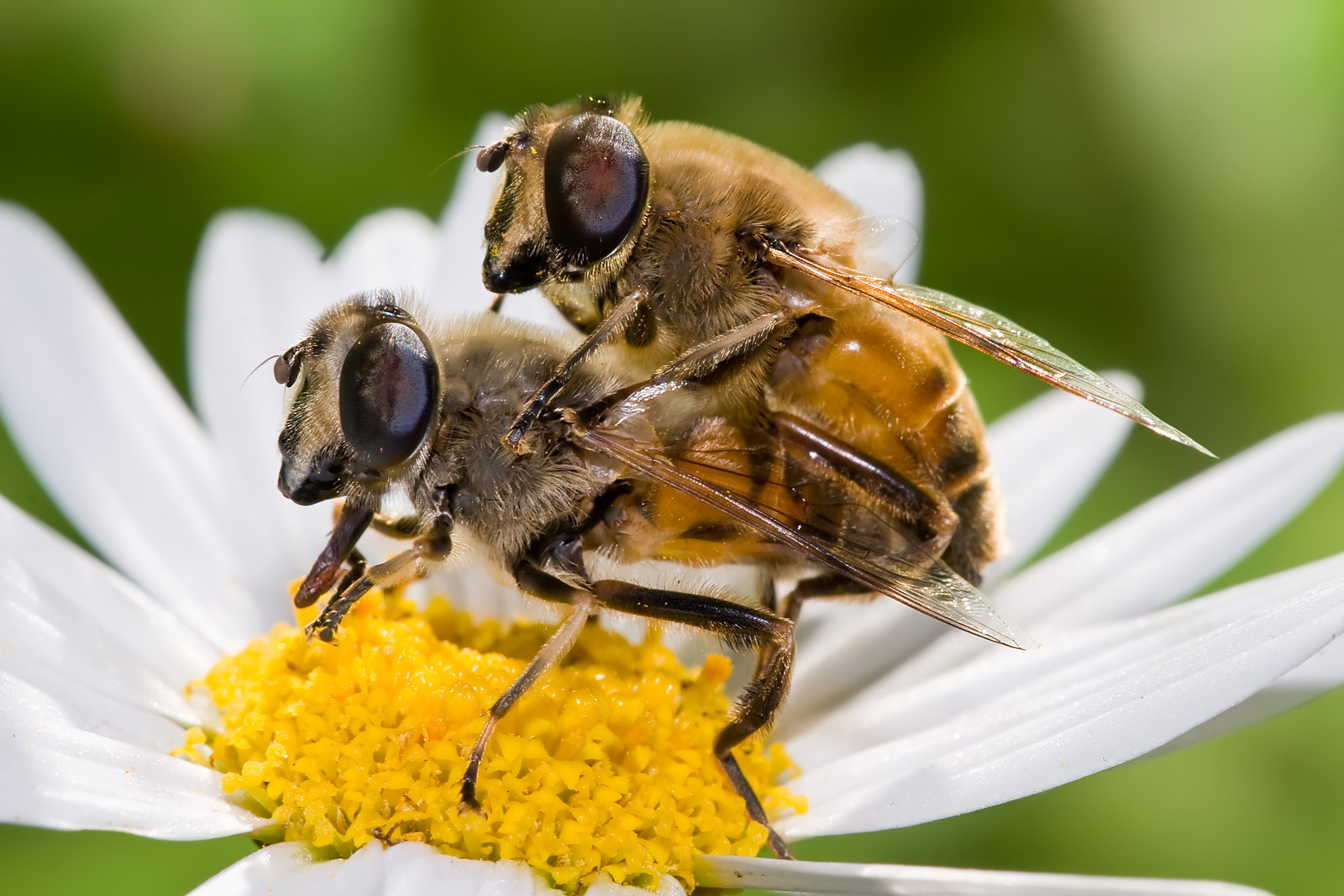
Drone flies mating on a daisy inflorescence

Mating can happen while a pair of E. tenax is flying, with the male uppermost, or on the ground while the female fly is resting on foliage. After mating, the adult female lays clusters of about 10 eggs near dirty, contaminated water, sewage, or decomposing organic substances.

== Diet ==
The diet of Eristalis tenax consists mostly of nectar and the pollen of flowers. During the imago stage, the fly drinks mostly nectar, but will take a little water when it is presented.

=== Pollen eating ===
It was found by researchers that when E. tenax accidentally traps pollen among the body hairs, the pollen grains are combed off by the front and hind tibia, and transferred to pollen-retaining bristles on the front and hind tarsi. The pollen grains that are retained among the front tarsal bristle are eaten directly from the bristles. Those caught by the hind tarsi are transferred in flight, by leg scraping, to the front tarsi, where they are then eaten. E. tenax also eats pollen directly from the anthers of flowers.

== Pollination ==
Diptera are an important but often neglected group of pollinators. They play a significant role in the pollination of agricultural biodiversity and the biodiversity of plants everywhere. Hoverflies are considered to be less specialized pollinators than bees, and they are more effective in open than tubular flowers. There is a significant difference in pollination efficiency between bees and flies.

== Mimicry ==
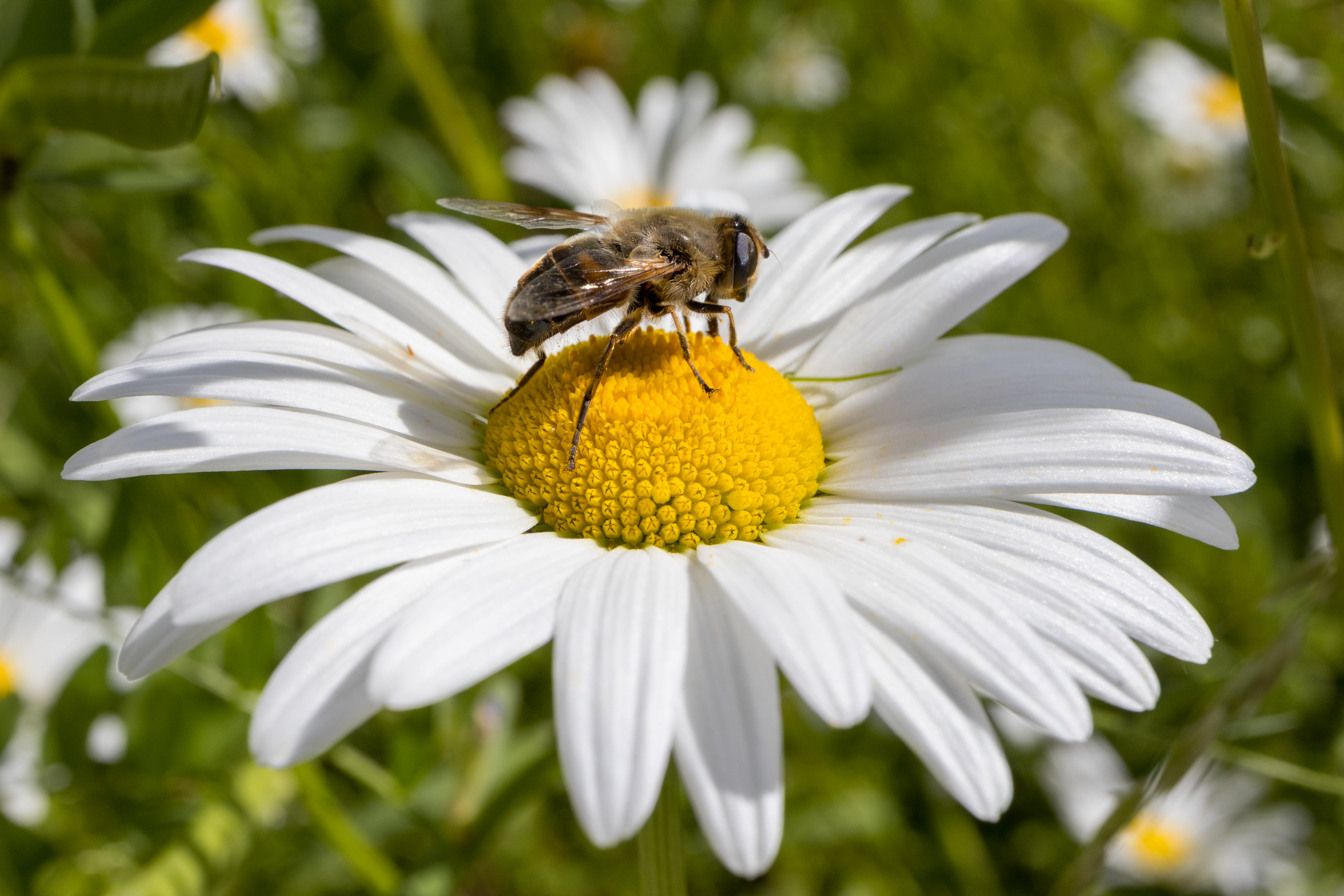
Collecting pollen

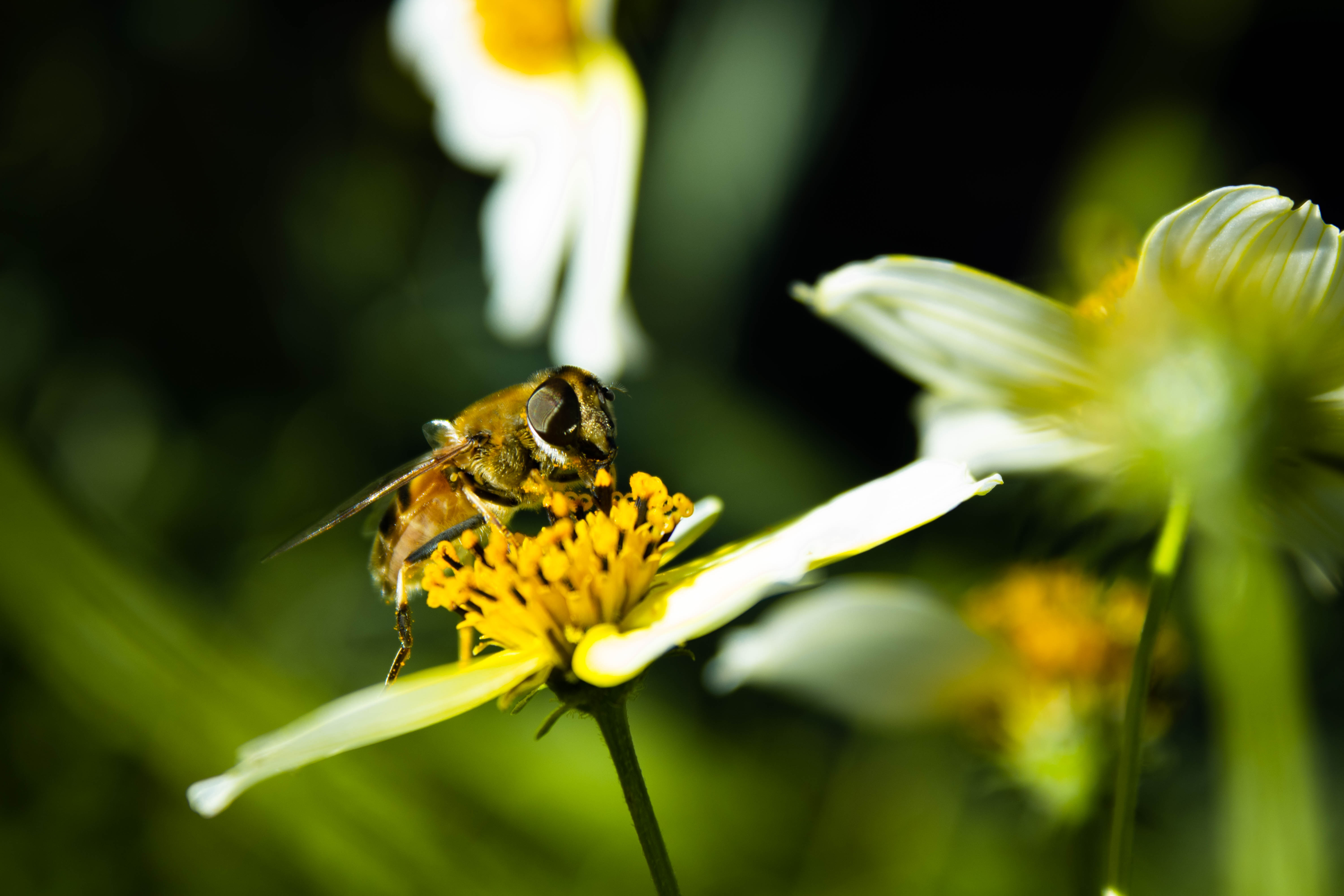
Pollination

There is little doubt that the morphological and behavioral similarities between E. tenax and the honey bee are mainly a result of convergent evolution in response to similar food-gathering requirements. Bees are common models for several Dipteran mimics They are similar in their general form, flight, and coloration. There are reports on the genetics of honeybees that show that the factors controlling the coloration are the same as the ones controlling the coloration in E. tenax. In both species branched hairs and spirally grooved bristles act as collectors and retainers of pollen, and leg-scraping that occurs during hovering allows the transfer of pollen to take place, from hind legs to front legs in E. tenax, and in the reverse direction in honey bees. E. tenax also has partial mimicry of wasps. To improve the wasp mimicry there seems to be an epistatic influence on the Ap gene on the hair color genes. The lightest phenotype of E. tenax is a light yellow, and seen most clearly as yellow bands along its sides, where a wasp has stripes of yellow pigment. The lighter patterns would be less beneficial as wasp mimicry early in the year, before there a great number of wasps emerge.

== Activity ==
Common drone flies are active during much of the year, from March to December, and sometimes they are more numerous than honeybees, especially during autumn in urban areas. Males and females occur in roughly equal numbers in summer and autumn, but males are very rare in the spring, when fertilized females come out of hibernation.
