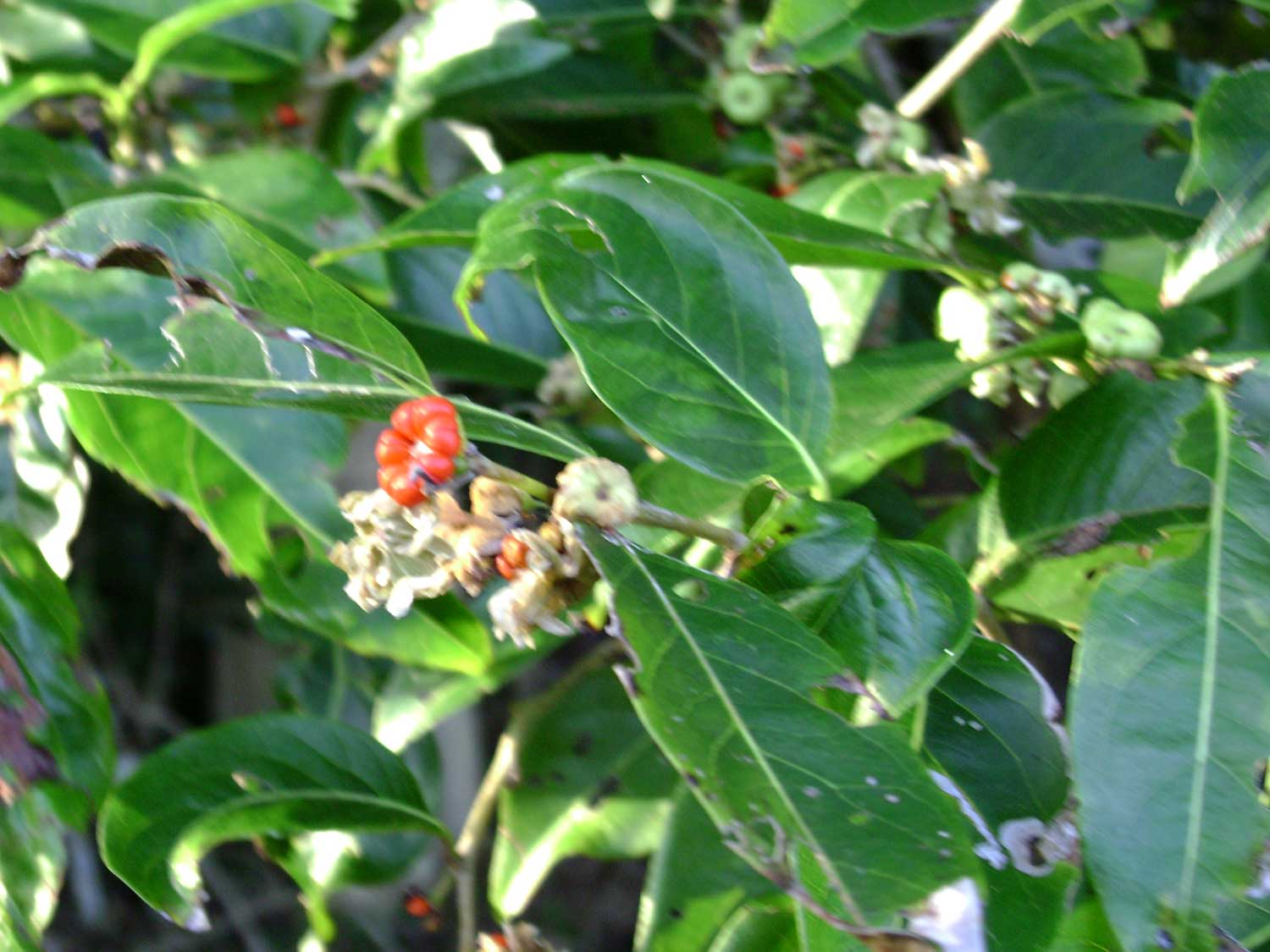
- Glochidion ramiflorum

Scientific classification
- Kingdom: Plantae
- Clade: Tracheophytes
- Clade: Angiosperms
- Clade: Eudicots
- Clade: Rosids
- Order: Malpighiales
- Family: Phyllanthaceae
- Subfamily: Phyllanthoideae
- Tribe: Phyllantheae
- Genus: Glochidion; J.R.Forst. & G.Forst.

Species
- 169; see full list

= Glochidion =

Genus of flowering plants

Glochidion is a genus of flowering plants in the family Phyllanthaceae, known as cheese trees or buttonwood in Australia, and leafflower trees in the scientific literature. It comprises about 170 species, distributed from Madagascar to the Pacific Islands. Glochidion species are used as food plants by the larvae of some Lepidoptera species including Aenetus eximia and Endoclita damor. The Nicobarese people have attested to the medicinal properties found in G. calocarpum, saying that its bark and seed are most effective in curing abdominal disorders associated with amoebiasis.

Glochidion are of note in the fields of pollination biology and coevolution because they have a specialized mutualism with moths in the genus Epicephala (leafflower moths), in which the moths actively pollinate the flowers—thereby ensuring that the tree may produce viable seeds—but also lay eggs in the flowers' ovaries, where their larvae consume a subset of the developing seeds as nourishment. Other species of Epicephala are pollinators, and in some cases, non-pollinating seed predators, of certain species of plants in the genera Phyllanthus and Breynia, both closely related to Glochidion. This relationship is similar to those between figs and fig wasps and yuccas and yucca moths.

Although the genus Glochidion is native only to the Old World, the East Asian species Glochidion puberum has become naturalized at several locations in the U.S. state of Alabama.

In a 2006 revision of the Phyllanthaceae, it was recommended that Glochidion be subsumed in Phyllanthus. New combinations in Phyllanthus have been published for Madagascar and the Pacific Islands, but most remain to be published.

== Selected species ==
As of February 2025, Plants of the World Online accepts 169 species. Selected species include:

- Glochidion carrickii Airy Shaw
- Glochidion harveyanum Domin
- Glochidion hylandii Airy Shaw
- Glochidion stylosum Ridl.
- Glochidion symingtonii Airy Shaw

=== Formerly placed here ===
- Phyllanthus apodogynus (Airy Shaw) Govaerts (as Glochidion apodogynum Airy Shaw)
- Phyllanthus bourdillonii (Gamble) Chakrab. & N.P.Balakr. (as Glochidion bourdillonii Gamble)
- Phyllanthus calocarpus (Kurz) Chakrab. & N.P.Balakr. (as Glochidion calocarpum Kurz)
- Phyllanthus candolleanus (Wight & Arn.) Chakrab. & N.P.Balakr. (as Glochidion candolleanum (Wight & Arn.) Chakrab. & M.Gangop.)
- Phyllanthus comitus (J.Florence) W.L.Wagner & Lorence (as Glochidion comitum J.Florence)
- Phyllanthus eriocarpus (Champ. ex Benth.) Müll.Arg. (as Glochidion eriocarpum Champ. ex Benth.)
- Phyllanthus ferdinandi Müll.Arg. (as Glochidion ferdinandi (Mull.Arg.) F.M.Bailey) - cheese tree, buttonwood, pencil cedar, water gum, rain tree
- Phyllanthus grantii (J.Florence) W.L.Wagner & Lorence (as Glochidion grantii J.Florence)
- Phyllanthus hohenackeri Müll.Arg. (as Glochidion hohenackeri (Müll.Arg.) Bedd.)
  - Phyllanthus hohenackeri var. johnstonei (Hook.f.) N.P.Balakr. & Chakr. (as Glochidion hohenackeri var. johnstonei (Hook.f.) Chakrab. & M.Gangop.)
- Phyllanthus lanceolarius (Roxb.) Müll.Arg. (as Glochidion lanceolarium (Roxb.) Voigt)
- Phyllanthus lobocarpus Benth. (as Glochidion lobocarpum (Benth.) F.M.Bailey)
- Phyllanthus longfieldiae Ridl. (as Glochidion longfieldiae (Ridl.) F.Br.)
- Phyllanthus manono (Baill. ex Müll.Arg.) Müll.Arg. (as Glochidion manono Baill. ex Müll.Arg.)
- Phyllanthus marchionicus (F.Br.) W.L.Wagner & Lorence (as Glochidion marchionicum F.Br. and G. tooviianum J.Florence)
- Phyllanthus mariannensis W.L.Wagner & Lorence (as Glochidion marianum Müll.Arg.)
- Phyllanthus moonii (Thwaites) Müll.Arg. (as Glochidion moonii Thwaites)
- Phyllanthus nadeaudii (J.Florence) W.L.Wagner & Lorence (as Glochidion nadeaudii J.Florence)
- Phyllanthus nemoralis (Thwaites) Müll.Arg. (as Glochidion nemorale Thwaites)
- Phyllanthus obliquus (Willd.) Müll.Arg.
  - Phyllanthus obliquus var. mollis Müll.Arg.
  - Phyllanthus obliquus var. obliquus (as Glochidion zeylanicum (Gaertn.) A.Juss.)
- Phyllanthus papenooensis (J.Florence) W.L.Wagner & Lorence (as Glochidion papenooense J.Florence)
- Phyllanthus pitcairnensis (F.Br.) W.L.Wagner & Lorence (as Glochidion pitcairnense (F.Br.) H.St.John)
- Phyllanthus puber (L.) Müll.Arg. (as Glochidion puberum (L.) Hutch.)
- Phyllanthus raiateaensis W.L.Wagner & Lorence (as Glochidion moorei P.T.Li)
- Phyllanthus raivavensis (F.Br.) W.L.Wagner & Lorence (as Glochidion raivavense F.Br.)
- Phyllanthus rapaensis (J.Florence) W.L.Wagner & Lorence (as Glochidion rapaense J.Florence)
- Phyllanthus seemannii (Müll.Arg.) Müll.Arg. (as Glochidion seemannii Müll.-Arg.)
- Phyllanthus st-johnii W.L.Wagner & Lorence (as Glochidion myrtifolium J.W.Moore)
- Phyllanthus stellatus Retz. (as Glochidion stellatum (Retz.) Bedd.)
- Phyllanthus subscandens (Zoll. & Moritzi) Müll.Arg. (as Glochidion insulare (Müll.Arg.) J.J.Sm.)
- Phyllanthus taitensis (Baill. ex Müll.Arg.) Müll.Arg. (as Glochidion taitense Baill. ex Müll-Arg.)
- Phyllanthus temehaniensis (J.W.Moore) W.L.Wagner & Lorence (as Glochidion temehaniense J.W.Moore)
- Phyllanthus xerocarpus O.Schwarz (as Glochidion xerocarpum (O.Schwarz) Airy Shaw)
