= List of Phyllanthus species =

As of April 2026 Plants of the World Online accepts 1,064 species in genus Phyllanthus. Names accepted by the World Checklist of Selected Plant Families as of January 2018 are listed below – about 1000 species, with a further 1200-odd synonyms.

== A-E ==
=== A ===
- Phyllanthus abditus G.L.Webster – S.W. Haiti (Massif de la Hotte)
- Phyllanthus abnormis Baill. – Florida, S. Central U.S. to N.E. Mexico — Drummond's leafflower
- Phyllanthus acacioides Urb. – Tobago
- Phyllanthus acidus (L.) Skeels – Brazil (Pará) – country gooseberry, gooseberry tree, Malay gooseberry, Otaheite gooseberry or Tahitian gooseberry tree
- Phyllanthus acinacifolius Airy Shaw & G.L.Webster – N.E. Papua New Guinea
- Phyllanthus actephilifolius J.J.Sm. – W. New Guinea
- Phyllanthus acuminatus Vahl – Caribbean, Mexico to N.W. Argentina – Jamaican gooseberry tree
- Phyllanthus acutifolius Poir. ex Spreng. – S.E. Brazil
- Phyllanthus acutissimus Miq. – S. Myanmar to W. Malesia
- Phyllanthus adenodiscus Müll.Arg. – Mexico
- Phyllanthus adianthoides Klotzsch – Guyana to Suriname
- Phyllanthus aeneus Baill. – New Caledonia
- Phyllanthus affinis Müll.Arg. – Sri Lanka
- Phyllanthus ajmerianus L.B.Chaudhary & R.R.Rao – India (Rajasthan)
- Phyllanthus albidiscus (Ridl.) Airy Shaw – Peninsula Thailand to Pen. Malaysia, Jawa
- Phyllanthus albizzioides (Kurz) Hook.f. – Myanmar
- Phyllanthus albus (Blanco) Müll.Arg. – Philippines, Sulawesi
- Phyllanthus allemii G.L.Webster – Brazil (Goiás)
- Phyllanthus almadensis Müll.Arg. – Brazil (S.E. Bahia)
- Phyllanthus alpestris Beille – W. Tropical Africa
- Phyllanthus amarus Schumach. & Thonn. – Tropical & Subtrop. America
- Phyllanthus ambatovolanus Leandri – CE. Madagascar
- Phyllanthus amentuliger Müll.Arg. – Fiji (E. Viti Levu, Vanua Levu)
- Phyllanthus amicorum G.L.Webster – Tonga
- Phyllanthus amieuensis Guillaumin – New Caledonia (Col d'Amieu)
- Phyllanthus amnicola G.L.Webster – Dominican Rep
- Phyllanthus ampandrandavae Leandri – S. Madagascar
- Phyllanthus anabaptizatus Müll.Arg. – Sri Lanka
- Phyllanthus analamerae Leandri – W. Madagascar (Diego-Suarez)
- Phyllanthus anamalayanus (Gamble) G.L.Webster – S. India (Anamalai Hills)
- Phyllanthus andamanicobaricus Chakrab. & N.P.Balakr. – Andaman & Nicobar Islands, Myanmar
- Phyllanthus andamanicus N.P.Balakr. & N.G.Nair – N. Andaman Islands
- Phyllanthus anderssonii Müll.Arg. – Windward Islands
- Phyllanthus andranovatensis Jean F.Brunel & J.P.Roux – S.E. Madagascar
- Phyllanthus anfractuosus (Gibbs) W.L.Wagner & Lorence – Fiji (Viti Levu, Ovalau)
- Phyllanthus angkorensis Beille – E. Thailand to Cambodia
- Phyllanthus angolensis Müll.Arg. – Malawi, Zambia, Angola
- Phyllanthus angustatus Hutch. – Zambia
- Phyllanthus angustifolius (Sw.) Sw. – Caribbean
- Phyllanthus angustissimus Müll.Arg. – Brazil (Bahia to Rio Grande do Sul)
- Phyllanthus anisolobus Müll.Arg. – Nicaragua to W. Ecuador
- Phyllanthus anisophyllioides Merr. – Philippines
- Phyllanthus ankarana Leandri – N. & W. Madagascar
- Phyllanthus ankaratrae (Leandri) Petra Hoffm. & McPherson – Central Madagascar (Ambositra)
- Phyllanthus ankazobensis Ralim. & Petra Hoffm. – Madagascar
- Phyllanthus anthopotamicus Hand.-Mazz. – S. China
- Phyllanthus aoraiensis Nadeaud – Society Islands
- Phyllanthus aoupinieensis M.Schmid – New Caledonia (Massif de l'Aoupinié)
- Phyllanthus aphanostylus Airy Shaw & G.L.Webster – New Guinea (incl. D'Entrecasteaux Islands)
- Phyllanthus apiculatus Merr. – Philippines
- Phyllanthus apodogynus (Airy Shaw) Govaerts Australia, New Guinea
- Phyllanthus aracaensis G.L.Webster ex Secco & A.Rosário – Brazil (Amazonas, Roraima)
- Phyllanthus arachnodes Govaerts & Radcl.-Sm. – Cambodia
- Phyllanthus arbuscula (Sw.) J.F.Gmel. – Jamaica
- Phyllanthus archboldianus Airy Shaw & G.L.Webster – New Guinea
- Phyllanthus ardisianthus Airy Shaw & G.L.Webster – W. New Guinea
- Phyllanthus arenarius Beille – Vietnam, S. China
- Phyllanthus arenicola Casar. – S.E. Brazil
- Phyllanthus argyi H.Lév. – S. China
- Phyllanthus aridus Benth. – N. Western Australia, Northern Territory
- Phyllanthus armstrongii Benth. – Northern Territory
- Phyllanthus artensis M.Schmid – New Caledonia (N. Ile Art)
- Phyllanthus arvensis Müll.Arg. – DR Congo to S. Africa
- Phyllanthus aspersus Jean F.Brunel & J.P.Roux – Cameroon
- Phyllanthus asperulatus Hutch. – Northern Province, Botswana, Mozamboque, Zimbabwe
- Phyllanthus assamicus Müll.Arg. – India to Taiwan
- Phyllanthus atabapoensis Jabl. – Colombia to N. Brazil
- Phyllanthus atalaiensis G.L.Webster – Brazil (Goiás)
- Phyllanthus atalotrichus (A.C.Sm.) W.L.Wagner & Lorence – Fiji (Viti Levu)
- Phyllanthus atrovirens (A.C.Sm.) W.L.Wagner & Lorence – Fiji (S. Viti Levu)
- Phyllanthus attenuatus Miq. – S. Tropical America
- Phyllanthus augustini Baill. – Brazil (Espírito Santo, Rio de Janeiro)
- Phyllanthus australis Hook.f. – S. & E. Australia, Tasmania
- Phyllanthus austroparensis Radcl.-Sm. – Tanzania
- Phyllanthus avanguiensis M.Schmid – New Caledonia (Mt. Boulinda)
- Phyllanthus avicularis Müll.Arg. – Brazil (Minas Gerais, São Paulo)
- Phyllanthus awaensis G.L.Webster – Ecuador (Carchi)
- Phyllanthus axillaris (Sw.) Müll.Arg. – W. Jamaica

=== B ===
- Phyllanthus baeckeoides J.T.Hunter & J.J.Bruhl – Western Australia (near Laverton)
- Phyllanthus baeobotryoides Wall. ex Müll.Arg. – Assam to Myanmar
- Phyllanthus bahiensis Müll.Arg. – N.E. Brazil
- Phyllanthus baillonianus Müll.Arg. – S.W. India, Sri Lanka
- Phyllanthus baladensis Baill. – N.W. & Central New Caledonia
- Phyllanthus balakrishnanii Sunil, K.M.P.Kumar & Naveen Kum. – India (Kerala)
- Phyllanthus balansae Beille – Vietnam
- Phyllanthus balansanus Guillaumin – S.W. New Caledonia
- Phyllanthus balgooyi Petra Hoffm. & A.J.M.Baker – Borneo (Sabah) to Philippines
- Phyllanthus bancilhonae Jean F.Brunel & J.P.Roux – W. Tropical Africa
- Phyllanthus baraouaensis M.Schmid – New Caledonia (W. Mé Maoya)
- Phyllanthus barbarae M.C.Johnst. – N.E. Mexico
- Phyllanthus bathianus Leandri – Central Madagascar
- Phyllanthus beddomei (Gamble) M.Mohanan – S.W. India
- Phyllanthus bemangidiensis Ralim. – Madagascar
- Phyllanthus benguelensis Müll.Arg. – Angola
- Phyllanthus benguetensis C.B.Rob. – Philippines
- Phyllanthus bequaertii Robyns & Lawalrée – W. Central & E. Tropical Africa
- Phyllanthus bernardii Jabl. – Venezuela (Mérida)
- Phyllanthus bernierianus Baill. ex Müll.Arg. – Mozambique, Madagascar
- Phyllanthus berteroanus Müll.Arg. – N. Hispaniola
- Phyllanthus betsileanus Leandri – Madagascar
- Phyllanthus biantherifer Croizat – Brazil (Amazonas: Humayta)
- Phyllanthus bicolor Vis. – Venezuela
- Phyllanthus billardierei (Baill.) Müll.Arg. – New Caledonia (incl. îs. Loyauté)
- Phyllanthus binhii Thin – Vietnam
- Phyllanthus birmanicus Müll.Arg. – Myanmar
- Phyllanthus blanchetianus Müll.Arg. – Brazil (Bahia)
- Phyllanthus blancoanus Müll.Arg. – Philippines
- Phyllanthus bodinieri (H.Lév.) Rehder – China (S.E. Guangxi, SE. Guizhou)
- Phyllanthus boehmii Pax – Ethiopia to S. Tropical Africa
- Phyllanthus boguenensis M.Schmid – Central New Caledonia
- Phyllanthus bojerianus (Baill.) Müll.Arg. – Madagascar
- Phyllanthus bokorensis Tagane – S. Cambodia
- Phyllanthus bolivarensis Steyerm. – Venezuela (Bolívar)
- Phyllanthus bolivianus Pax & K.Hoffm. – Bolivia
- Phyllanthus bonnardii Jean F.Brunel – Ivory Coast
- Phyllanthus borenensis M.G.Gilbert – Ethiopia (Sidamo)
- Phyllanthus borjaensis Jabl. – Colombia to S. Venezuela
- Phyllanthus borneensis Müll.Arg. – W. Malesia
- Phyllanthus botryanthus Müll.Arg. – S.W. Mexico, Colombia, Venezuela, Aruba, Curaçao, Bonaire
- Phyllanthus bourdillonii (Gamble) Chakrab. & N.P.Balakr. – Bhutan, S. India
- Phyllanthus bourgeoisii Baill. – New Guinea to N.W. & S. Central New Caledonia
- Phyllanthus brachyphyllus Urb. – Haiti
- Phyllanthus bracteatus (Gillespie) W.L.Wagner & Lorence – Fiji (Viti Levu)
- Phyllanthus brandegeei Millsp. – Mexico (Baja California Sur)
- Phyllanthus brasiliensis (Aubl.) Poir. – Lesser Antilles to S. Tropical America
- Phyllanthus brassii C.T.White – Queensland (Thornton Peak)
- Phyllanthus brevipes Hook.f. – Arunachal Pradesh (Mishmi Hills)
- Phyllanthus breynioides (P.T.Li) Govaerts & Radcl.-Sm. – China (Guangxi)
- Phyllanthus brothersonii (J.Florence) W.L.Wagner & Lorence – Society Islands
- Phyllanthus brunnescens (A.C.Sm.) W.L.Wagner & Lorence – Fiji
- Phyllanthus brynaertii Jean F.Brunel – DR Congo
- Phyllanthus buchii Urb. – Hispaniola
- Phyllanthus bupleuroides Baill. – New Caledonia
- Phyllanthus burundiensis Jean F.Brunel – Burundi
- Phyllanthus buxifolius (Blume) Müll.Arg. – Jawa to Lesser Sunda Islands
- Phyllanthus buxoides Guillaumin – N.W. New Caledonia

=== C ===
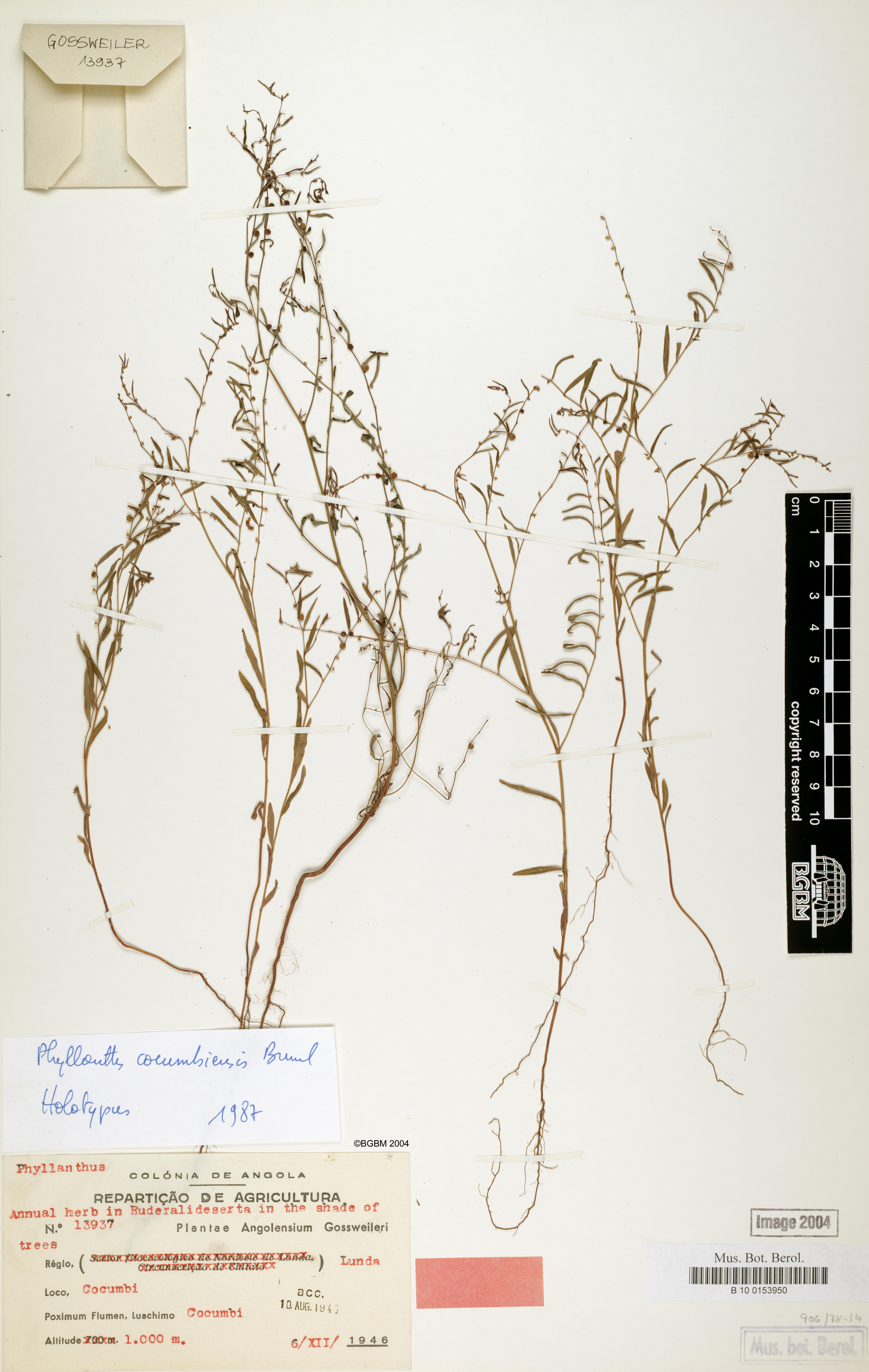
P. cocumbiensis, Jean F. Brunel. Holotype at Herbarium Berolinense. Collected by John Gossweiler, 6 December 1946 at Cocumbi, Luanda, Angola. Leg.: J. Gossweiler 13937 (BD)

- Phyllanthus cacuminum Müll.Arg. – Jawa
- Phyllanthus caesiifolius Petra Hoffm. & Cheek – Cameroon
- Phyllanthus caesius Airy Shaw & G.L.Webster – New Guinea
- Phyllanthus caespitosus Brenan – Malawi, Zambia
- Phyllanthus calcicola M.Schmid – N.W. New Caledonia
- Phyllanthus calciphilus (Croizat) W.L.Wagner & Lorence – Fiji (Fulanga, Kambara)
- Phyllanthus caledonicus (Müll.Arg.) Müll.Arg. – New Caledonia (incl. î. des Pins, îs. Loyauté)
- Phyllanthus caligatus Jean F.Brunel & J.P.Roux – Cameroon
- Phyllanthus callejasii G.L.Webster – Colombia
- Phyllanthus calocarpus (Kurz) Chakrab. & N.P.Balakr. – Andaman and Nicobar Islands
- Phyllanthus calycinus Labill. – S.E. Sulawesi, Western Australia, South Australia
- Phyllanthus camerunensis Jean F.Brunel – Cameroon
- Phyllanthus candolleanus (Wight & Arn.) Chakrab. & N.P.Balakr. – S.W. India, Sri Lanka
- Phyllanthus caparaoensis G.L.Webster – S.E. Brazil
- Phyllanthus caraculiensis Jean F.Brunel – Angola
- Phyllanthus caribaeus Urb. – S. Mexico to S. Tropical America and Windward Islands
- Phyllanthus carinatus Beille – Vietnam
- Phyllanthus carlottae M.Schmid – S.E. New Caledonia
- Phyllanthus carnosulus Müll.Arg. – S.E. Cuba
- Phyllanthus caroliniensis Walter – Central & E. U.S. to N.E. Argentina – Carolina leafflower
- Phyllanthus carpentariae Müll.Arg. – Northern Territory, Queensland, New South Wales
- Phyllanthus carrenoi Steyerm. – Venezuela (Bolívar: Cerro Jaua)
- Phyllanthus carunculatus Jean F.Brunel – DR Congo
- Phyllanthus carvalhoi G.L.Webster – Brazil (S.E. Bahia)
- Phyllanthus casearioides S.Moore – New Caledonia (Touho Reg.)
- Phyllanthus cassioides Rusby – Bolivia
- Phyllanthus casticum P.Willemet – W. Indian Ocean
- Phyllanthus castus S.Moore – S.E. New Caledonia
- Phyllanthus caudatifolius Merr. – Philippines
- Phyllanthus caudatus Müll.Arg. – S.E. New Caledonia
- Phyllanthus cauliflorus (Sw.) Griseb. – W. Jamaica
- Phyllanthus cauticola J.T.Hunter & J.J.Bruhl – Northern Territory
- Phyllanthus caymanensis G.L.Webster & Proctor – Cayman Islands
- Phyllanthus cedrelifolius Verdc. – KwaZulu-Natal, Cape Province
- Phyllanthus celastroides Müll.Arg. – Borneo (S.E. Kalimantan), Sumatera (Bangka, Billiton)
- Phyllanthus celebicus Koord. – Sulawesi
- Phyllanthus ceratostemon Brenan – W. Central Tropical Africa to Chad, Zambia
- Phyllanthus chacoensis Morong – Brazil to Bolivia and N.E. Argentina
- Phyllanthus chamaecerasus Baill. – New Caledonia
- Phyllanthus chamaecristoides Urb. – Cuba
- Phyllanthus chamaepeuce Ridl. – S. Indo-China to Philippines
- Phyllanthus chandrabosei Govaerts & Radcl.-Sm. – India (Tamil Nadu)
- Phyllanthus chantrieri André – Vietnam
- Phyllanthus chayamaritiae Chantar. & Kantachot – Thailand
- Phyllanthus chekiangensis Croizat & Metcalf – S.E. China
- Phyllanthus cherrieri M.Schmid – New Caledonia (Mt. Arago)
- Phyllanthus chevalieri Beille – Chad to W. Ethiopia and Tanzania
- Phyllanthus chiapensis Sprague – Mexico (Chiapas: Cacote)
- Phyllanthus chimantae Jabl. – Venezuela (Bolívar: Macizo del Chimantá)
- Phyllanthus choretroides Müll.Arg. – Brazil (Bahia, Minas Gerais)
- Phyllanthus christophersenii (Croizat) W.L.Wagner & Lorence – Samoa
- Phyllanthus chrysanthus Baill. – New Caledonia
- Phyllanthus chryseus Howard – E. Cuba (Sierra de Moa)
- Phyllanthus ciccoides Müll.Arg. – Papua New Guinea to Vanuatu
- Phyllanthus ciliaris Baill. – New Caledonia (near Balade)
- Phyllanthus cinctus Urb. – E. Cuba
- Phyllanthus cinereus Müll.Arg. – Sri Lanka
- Phyllanthus cladanthus Müll.Arg. – Central & E. Jamaica
- Phyllanthus cladotrichus Müll.Arg. – S.E. Brazil (to Bahia)
- Phyllanthus clamboides (F.Muell.) Diels – Papuasia to Queensland
- Phyllanthus clarkei Hook.f. – Bhutan to S. China
- Phyllanthus claussenii Müll.Arg. – Brazil
- Phyllanthus cleistanthoides (Fosberg) W.L.Wagner & Lorence – Caroline Islands
- Phyllanthus coalcomanensis Croizat – W. Mexico, Nicaragua
- Phyllanthus coccineus (Banks) Müll.Arg. – Assam to S. China and Indo-China
- Phyllanthus cochinchinensis Spreng. – Assam to Nansei-shoto and Indo-China
- Phyllanthus cocumbiensis Jean F.Brunel – Angola
- Phyllanthus collinsiae Craib – Indo-China, Lesser Sunda Islands
- Phyllanthus collinus Domin – Queensland
- Phyllanthus columnaris Müll.Arg. – Andaman Islands, Myanmar to N. Peninsula Malaysia
- Phyllanthus coluteoides Baill. ex Müll.Arg. – W. Madagascar, Mozambique Channel Islands
- Phyllanthus comitus (J.Florence) W.L.Wagner & Lorence – Pitcairn Islands
- Phyllanthus comorensis Leandri – Comoros
- Phyllanthus comosus Urb. – N.E. Cuba
- Phyllanthus compressus Kunth – Mexico to Peru
- Phyllanthus comptonii S.Moore – New Caledonia (Ngoye Valley)
- Phyllanthus comptus G.L.Webster – Cuba (Cajalbana Reg.)
- Phyllanthus concolor (Müll.Arg.) Müll.Arg. – Wallis-Futuna Is, Fiji, Tonga, Cook Islands
- Phyllanthus confusus Brenan – Malawi (Mt. Mulanje)
- Phyllanthus conjugatus M.Schmid – New Caledonia
- Phyllanthus consanguineus Müll.Arg. – Réunion
- Phyllanthus coodei Ralim. & Petra Hoffm. – Madagascar
- Phyllanthus cordatulus C.B.Rob. – Philippines
- Phyllanthus cordatus (Seem. ex Müll.Arg.) Müll.Arg. – Fiji
- Phyllanthus coriaceus (Thwaites) Müll.Arg. – Sri Lanka
- Phyllanthus cornutus Baill. – New Caledonia (incl. î. des Pins)
- Phyllanthus coursii Leandri – E. Central Madagascar (near Lac Alaotra)
- Phyllanthus craibii Chakrab. & N.P.Balakr. – E. Myanmar to Cambodia
- Phyllanthus crassinervius Radcl.-Sm. – DR Congo, Tanzania (Mbeya), Malawi, Zambia
- Phyllanthus cristalensis Urb. – E. Cuba (Sierra del Cristal)
- Phyllanthus cryptophilus (Comm. ex A.Juss.) Müll.Arg. – S.E. & ESE. Madagascar
- Phyllanthus cuatrecasanus G.L.Webster – Colombia
- Phyllanthus cuneifolius (Britton) Croizat – Puerto Rico
- Phyllanthus cunenensis Jean F.Brunel – Angola
- Phyllanthus curranii C.B.Rob. – Philippines
- Phyllanthus cuscutiflorus S.Moore – Papua New Guinea to Queensland
- Phyllanthus cuspidatus Müll.Arg. – Samoa
- Phyllanthus cyrtophylloides Müll.Arg. – Jawa
- Phyllanthus cyrtophyllus (Miq.) Müll.Arg. – Sumatera
- Phyllanthus cyrtostylus (Miq.) Müll.Arg. – Jawa to Lesser Sunda Islands

=== D ===
- Phyllanthus daclacensis Thin – Vietnam
- Phyllanthus dallachyanus Benth. – N. Australia
- Phyllanthus daltonii Müll.Arg. – Sikkim to S. China and Peninsula Malaysia
- Phyllanthus dasystylus (Kurz) Chakrab. & N.P.Balakr. – China (Yunnan) to Myanmar
- Phyllanthus dawsonii Steyerm. – Brazil (Goiás)
- Phyllanthus dealbatus Alston – Sri Lanka
- Phyllanthus debilis J.G.Klein ex Willd. – Maldives to W. Malesia – lagoon spurge, niruri
- Phyllanthus deciduiramus Däniker – New Caledonia (Mt. Kaala)
- Phyllanthus dekindtianus Jean F.Brunel – Angola
- Phyllanthus delagoensis Hutch. – Gabon to S. Africa
- Phyllanthus denticulatus Jean F.Brunel – Uganda
- Phyllanthus deplanchei Müll.Arg. – New Caledonia (incl. î. des Pins)
- Phyllanthus dewildeanus Jean F.Brunel – Ethiopia
- Phyllanthus dewildeorum M.G.Gilbert – W. Ethiopia
- Phyllanthus dictyophlebsis Radcl.-Sm. – Tanzania
- Phyllanthus dictyospermus Müll.Arg. – Brazil (Minas Gerais, São Paulo)
- Phyllanthus dimorphus Britton & P.Wilson – Cuba (Sierra de Trinidad)
- Phyllanthus dinklagei Pax – W. Central Tropical Africa
- Phyllanthus dinteri Pax – Namibia
- Phyllanthus discolaciniatus Jean F.Brunel – Cameroon
- Phyllanthus discolor Poepp. ex Spreng. – Central & W. Cuba
- Phyllanthus distichus Hook. & Arn. – Hawaiian Islands
- Phyllanthus dongmoensis Thin – Vietnam
- Phyllanthus dorotheae M.Schmid – Central & E. Central New Caledonia
- Phyllanthus dracunculoides Baill. – New Caledonia
- Phyllanthus duidae Gleason – Venezuela (Amazonas: Cerro Duida)
- Phyllanthus dumbeaensis M.Schmid – New Caledonia (Dumbéa-Couvelée)
- Phyllanthus dumetosus Poir. – Rodrigues
- Phyllanthus dumosus C.B.Rob. – Philippines
- Phyllanthus dunnianus (H.Lév.) Hand.-Mazz. ex Rehder – China (Guizhou, Yunnan, Guangxi), Vietnam
- Phyllanthus dusenii Hutch. – Nigeria to Cameroon
- Phyllanthus dzumacensis M.Schmid – New Caledonia (Dzumac Mts.)

=== E ===
- Phyllanthus echinospermus C.Wright – W. Cuba
- Phyllanthus edmundoi L.J.M.Santiago – Brazil (Bahia)
- Phyllanthus effusus S.Moore – Papua New Guinea
- Phyllanthus ekmanii G.L.Webster – Cuba (Sierra de Nipe)
- Phyllanthus elegans Wall. ex Müll.Arg. – Indo-China to N. Peninsula Malaysia
- Phyllanthus eliae (Jean F.Brunel & J.P.Roux) Jean F.Brunel – Togo
- Phyllanthus elsiae Urb. – Trinidad-Tobago, Mexico to N. South America
- Phyllanthus emarginatus (J.W.Moore) W.L.Wagner & Lorence – Society Islands
- Phyllanthus embergeri Haicour & Rossignol – Assam to S. China, Taiwan
- Phyllanthus emblica L. – Tropical & Subtrop. Asia – emblic, emblic myrobalan, Indian gooseberry or myrobalan
- Phyllanthus engleri Pax – Tanzania to S. Tropical Africa
- Phyllanthus epiphyllanthus L. – Caribbean
- Phyllanthus epiphylliferens Jean F.Brunel – DR Congo
- Phyllanthus eremicus R.L.Barrett & I.Telford – N. Western Australia
- Phyllanthus ericoides Torr. – Texas (Terrell Co.) to Mexico (Chihuahua)
- Phyllanthus eriocarpus (Champ. ex Benth.) Müll.Arg. – S. China, Taiwan, Indo-China to Malesia
- Phyllanthus erwinii J.T.Hunter & J.J.Bruhl – W. & Central Australia
- Phyllanthus erythrotrichus C.B.Rob. – Philippines
- Phyllanthus eurisladro Mart. ex Colla – Brazil (?)
- Phyllanthus euryoides (A.C.Sm.) W.L.Wagner & Lorence – Fiji (Viti Levu: Mt. Koromba)
- Phyllanthus eutaxioides S.Moore – Queensland (Darwin), Northern Territory (Gove Peninsula)
- Phyllanthus evanescens Brandegee – S. Central Louisiana to Nicaragua
- Phyllanthus everettii C.B.Rob. – Philippines
- Phyllanthus evrardii Beille – Vietnam
- Phyllanthus excisus Urb. – Cuba (Sierra Sagua Baracoa)
- Phyllanthus exilis S.Moore – N. Australia
- Phyllanthus eximius G.L.Webster & Proctor – Jamaica

== F-J ==
=== F ===
- Phyllanthus fadyenii Urb. – Jamaica
- Phyllanthus faguetii Baill. – New Caledonia
- Phyllanthus fallax Müll.Arg. – Brazil (Minas Gerais)
- Phyllanthus fangchengensis P.T.Li – China (S.E. Guangxi)
- Phyllanthus fastigiatus Mart. ex Müll.Arg. – Brazil (Minas Gerais, Mato Grosso)
- Phyllanthus favieri M.Schmid – New Caledonia
- Phyllanthus felicis Jean F.Brunel – Guinea
- Phyllanthus ferdinandi Müll.Arg. – Northern Territory, Queensland, New South Wales
- Phyllanthus filicifolius Gage – Peninsula Malaysia (Kedah)
- Phyllanthus fimbriatitepalus Guillaumin – Vanuatu
- Phyllanthus fimbriatus (Wight) Müll.Arg. – S.W. India
- Phyllanthus fimbricalyx P.T.Li – China (S.W. Yunnan)
- Phyllanthus finschii K.Schum. – New Guinea, Bismarck Arch., Tenimbar I
- Phyllanthus fischeri Pax – Eritrea to Tanzania
- Phyllanthus flagellaris Benth. – Northern Territory (Darwin)
- Phyllanthus flagelliformis Müll.Arg. – N.E. Brazil
- Phyllanthus flavidus (Kurz ex Teijsm. & Binn.) Müll.Arg. – Jawa
- Phyllanthus flaviflorus (K.Schum. & Lauterb.) Airy Shaw – Papua New Guinea
- Phyllanthus flexuosus (Siebold & Zucc.) Müll.Arg. – S. China, S. Central & S. Japan
- Phyllanthus florencei W.L.Wagner & Lorence – Society Islands, Tubuai Is
- Phyllanthus fluitans Benth. ex Müll.Arg. – Mexico (Tabasco), S. Tropical America
- Phyllanthus fluminis-athi Radcl.-Sm. – S. Central Kenya
- Phyllanthus fluminis-zambesi Radcl.-Sm. – Zambia
- Phyllanthus formosus Urb. – E. Cuba
- Phyllanthus forrestii W.W.Sm. – S. Central China
- Phyllanthus fotii Jean F.Brunel – Cameroon
- Phyllanthus fractiflexus M.Schmid – New Caledonia (Mt. Koniambo)
- Phyllanthus fraguensis M.C.Johnst. – Mexico
- Phyllanthus franchetianus H.Lév. – China (Guizhou, Sichuan, Yunnan)
- Phyllanthus francii Guillaumin – S. New Caledonia
- Phyllanthus fraternus G.L.Webster – Pakistan to N.W. India – Gulf leafflower
- Phyllanthus frazieri Radcl.-Sm. – Tanzania
- Phyllanthus friesii Hutch. – Tanzania (Iringa), Zambia
- Phyllanthus frodinii Airy Shaw – N.E. Papua New Guinea
- Phyllanthus fuernrohrii F.Muell. – Australia
- Phyllanthus fuertesii Urb. – Hispaniola
- Phyllanthus fulvirameus (Miq.) Müll.Arg. – Jawa, New Guinea (incl. Kep. Aru), Solomon Islands
- Phyllanthus fuscoluridus Müll.Arg. – Madagascar

=== G ===
- Phyllanthus gabonensis Jean F.Brunel – Equatorial Guinea to Gabon
- Phyllanthus gageanus (Gamble) M.Mohanan – S.W. India
- Phyllanthus gagnioevae Jean F.Brunel & J.P.Roux – W. & W. Central Tropical Africa
- Phyllanthus galeottianus Baill. – Mexico
- Phyllanthus gaudichaudii Müll.Arg. – Maluku to New Guinea
- Phyllanthus geniculatostemon Jean F.Brunel – Uganda
- Phyllanthus gentryi G.L.Webster – Panama
- Phyllanthus geoffrayi Beille – E. Thailand to Laos
- Phyllanthus gigantifolius Vidal – Philippines
- Phyllanthus gillespiei (Croizat) W.L.Wagner & Lorence – Fiji (Viti Levu)
- Phyllanthus gillettianus Jean F.Brunel – Kenya to Botswana
- Phyllanthus gjellerupi J.J.Sm. – W. New Guinea
- Phyllanthus glabrescens (Miq.) Müll.Arg. – Lesser Sunda Islands
- Phyllanthus gladiatus Müll.Arg. – Brazil (S.E. Bahia to Espírito Santo)
- Phyllanthus glaucinus (Miq.) Müll.Arg. – Sumatera
- Phyllanthus glaucophyllus Sond. – Tropical & S. Africa
- Phyllanthus glaziovii Müll.Arg. – S.E. Brazil (to Paraná)
- Phyllanthus glochidioides Elmer – Philippines
- Phyllanthus glomerulatus (Miq.) Müll.Arg. – India to W. & S. Malesia
- Phyllanthus gneissicus S.Moore – New Caledonia
- Phyllanthus goianensis L.J.M.Santiago – Brazil (Tocantins)
- Phyllanthus golonensis M.Schmid – New Caledonia (Golone)
- Phyllanthus gomphocarpus Hook.f. – Andaman and Nicobar Islands, Myanmar to Jawa
- Phyllanthus gongyloides Cordeiro & Carn.-Torres – Brazil (Bahia)
- Phyllanthus goniostemon Radcl.-Sm. – Uganda
- Phyllanthus gordonii Ralim. & Petra Hoffm. – Madagascar
- Phyllanthus gossweileri Hutch. – Gabon to Zambia
- Phyllanthus goudotianus (Baill.) Müll.Arg. – S.E. Madagascar
- Phyllanthus gracilentus Müll.Arg. – Jawa
- Phyllanthus gracilipes (Miq.) Müll.Arg. – China (W. Guangxi) to W. Malesia
- Phyllanthus gradyi M.J.Silva & M.F.Sales – N.E. Brazil
- Phyllanthus graminicola Hutch. – Zimbabwe to Northern Province
- Phyllanthus grandifolius L. – Mexico to Honduras
- Phyllanthus grantii (J.Florence) W.L.Wagner & Lorence – Society Islands
- Phyllanthus graveolens Kunth – S.W. Mexico, Costa Rica to N. Peru
- Phyllanthus grayanus Müll.Arg. – Society Islands
- Phyllanthus greenei Elmer – Philippines
- Phyllanthus guangdongensis P.T.Li – China (WS.W. Guangdong)
- Phyllanthus guanxiensis Govaerts & Radcl.-Sm. – China (S.W. Guangxi)
- Phyllanthus guillauminii Däniker – New Caledonia (Tiébaghi Mts.)
- Phyllanthus gunnii Hook.f. – E. & S.E. Australia
- Phyllanthus gypsicola McVaugh – Mexico (Baja California Sur, Colima, Jalisco)

=== H ===
- Phyllanthus hainanensis Merr. – Hainan
- Phyllanthus hakgalensis Thwaites ex Trimen – Sri Lanka
- Phyllanthus hamelinii I.Telford & R.L.Barrett – N.W. Western Australia
- Phyllanthus harmandii Beille – E. Thailand to Cambodia
- Phyllanthus harrimanii G.L.Webster – Mexico (Tamaulipas)
- Phyllanthus harrisii Radcl.-Sm. – Kenya, Tanzania (incl. Zanzibar)
- Phyllanthus hasskarlianus Müll.Arg. – Jawa
- Phyllanthus helenae M.Schmid – Central New Caledonia
- Phyllanthus helferi Müll.Arg. – S. Myanmar
- Phyllanthus heliotropus C.Wright ex Griseb. – W. Cuba (incl. I. de la Juventud)
- Phyllanthus heteradenius Müll.Arg. – N.E. Brazil (to Minas Gerais)
- Phyllanthus heterodoxus Müll.Arg. – Fiji (Vanua Levu, Fulanga)
- Phyllanthus heterophyllus E.Mey. ex Müll.Arg. – KwaZulu-Natal to Cape Province
- Phyllanthus heterotrichus Lundell – Mexico (San Luis Potosí)
- Phyllanthus hexadactylus McVaugh – W. Mexico
- Phyllanthus heyneanus Müll.Arg. – S.W. India
- Phyllanthus hildebrandtii Pax – Ethiopia, N. Somalia
- Phyllanthus hirtellus F.Muell. ex Müll.Arg. – S.E. Australia
- Phyllanthus hivaoaensis (J.Florence) W.L.Wagner & Lorence – Marquesas (Hiva Oa)
- Phyllanthus hodjelensis Schweinf. – Yemen
- Phyllanthus hohenackeri Müll.Arg. – S. India
- Phyllanthus holostylus Milne-Redh. – DR Congo, Angola, Zambia
- Phyllanthus hortensis Govaerts & Radcl.-Sm. – ?
- Phyllanthus hosokawae (Fosberg) W.L.Wagner & Lorence – Caroline Islands
- Phyllanthus houailouensis M.Schmid – Central New Caledonia (Houaïlou)
- Phyllanthus huahineensis (J.Florence) W.L.Wagner & Lorence – Society Islands
- Phyllanthus huallagensis Standl. ex Croizat – Ecuador to Peru
- Phyllanthus huberi Riina & P.E.Berry – Venezuela
- Phyllanthus humbertianus Leandri – S. Madagascar
- Phyllanthus humbertii (Leandri) Petra Hoffm. & McPherson – E. Central Madagascar
- Phyllanthus humpatanus Jean F.Brunel – Angola
- Phyllanthus hutchinsonianus S.Moore – Tanzania to Mozambique
- Phyllanthus hypoleucus Müll.Arg. – Brazil (Pernambuco to Espírito Santo)
- Phyllanthus hypospodius F.Muell. – Queensland (South Kennedy)
- Phyllanthus hyssopifolioides Kunth – Dominican Rep., Trinidad, Nicaragua to S. Tropical America

=== I ===
- Phyllanthus imbricatus G.L.Webster – Cuba (S.W. I. de la Juventud)
- Phyllanthus incrustatus Urb. – N.E. Cuba
- Phyllanthus incurvus Thunb. – S. Tropical & S. Africa
- Phyllanthus indigoferoides Benth. – N. Western Australia, Northern Territory
- Phyllanthus indofischeri Bennet – India (Tamil Nadu)
- Phyllanthus inflatus Hutch. – South Sudan to Mozambique
- Phyllanthus insignis Müll.Arg. – Sumatera, Jawa, Sulawesi
- Phyllanthus insulae-japen Airy Shaw – W. New Guinea
- Phyllanthus insulanus (Müll.Arg.) Müll.Arg. – Maluku
- Phyllanthus insulensis Beille – Vietnam
- Phyllanthus inusitatus (A.C.Sm.) W.L.Wagner & Lorence – Fiji (Vanua Levu: Mt. Ndelanathau)
- Phyllanthus involutus J.T.Hunter & J.J.Bruhl – S. Queensland, New South Wales
- Phyllanthus iratsiensis Leandri – S. Central Madagascar
- Phyllanthus irriguus Radcl.-Sm. – Tanzania (Songea)
- Phyllanthus isomonensis Leandri – S.E. Madagascar
- Phyllanthus itatiaiensis Brade – Brazil (Rio de Janeiro: Serra do Mantiqueira)
- Phyllanthus ivohibeus Leandri – Central & ES.E. Madagascar

=== J ===
- Phyllanthus jablonskianus Steyerm. & Luteyn – Venezuela (Sierra de la Neblina) to Brazil (Serra da Neblina)
- Phyllanthus jaegeri Jean F.Brunel & J.P.Roux – Sierra Leone
- Phyllanthus jaffrei M.Schmid – Central New Caledonia
- Phyllanthus jarawae (Chakrab. & N.P.Balakr.) Chakrab. & N.P.Balakr. – S. Andaman Islands
- Phyllanthus jauaensis Jabl. – Venezuela (Bolívar: Cerro Jaua)
- Phyllanthus jaubertii Vieill. ex Guillaumin – New Caledonia
- Phyllanthus juglandifolius Willd. Walnutleaf leafflower, Bigleaf leafflower – Tropical America
- Phyllanthus junceus Müll.Arg. – W. Cuba (incl. I. de la Juventud)

== K-O ==
=== K ===
- Phyllanthus kaessneri Hutch. – Kenya to Zambia
- Phyllanthus kampotensis Beille – Indo-China
- Phyllanthus kanalensis Baill. – New Caledonia
- Phyllanthus kanehirae (Hosok.) W.L.Wagner & Lorence – Caroline Islands
- Phyllanthus karibibensis Jean F.Brunel – Namibia
- Phyllanthus karnaticus (Chakrab. & M.Gangop.) Chakrab. & N.P.Balakr. – India (Karnataka)
- Phyllanthus kaweesakii Pornp., Chantar. & J.Parn – N.E. Thailand, one of the only four caudiciforms/succulents in this genus.
- Phyllanthus kelleanus Jean F.Brunel – Cameroon
- Phyllanthus kerrii Airy Shaw – N. & N.E. Thailand
- Phyllanthus kerstingii Jean F.Brunel – W. Tropical Africa
- Phyllanthus keyensis Warb. – New Guinea (Kei I.)
- Phyllanthus khasicus Müll.Arg. – E. Himalaya to Thailand, Andaman Islands
- Phyllanthus kidna Challen & Petra Hoffm. – Cameroon
- Phyllanthus kinabaluicus Airy Shaw – Borneo (Sabah)
- Phyllanthus kivuensis Jean F.Brunel – E. DR Congo
- Phyllanthus klotzschianus Müll.Arg. – Guyana, E. Brazil
- Phyllanthus koghiensis Guillaumin – S.E. New Caledonia (Massif des Koghis)
- Phyllanthus koniamboensis M.Schmid – New Caledonia
- Phyllanthus korthalsii Müll.Arg. – Borneo (S.E. Kalimantan)
- Phyllanthus kostermansii Airy Shaw – W. New Guinea
- Phyllanthus kouaouaensis M.Schmid – Central New Caledonia
- Phyllanthus koumacensis Guillaumin – N.W. New Caledonia
- Phyllanthus kozhikodianus Sivar. & Manilal – Indian Subcontinent to N. Thailand

=== L ===
- Phyllanthus lacerosus Airy Shaw – N. & E. Australia
- Phyllanthus laciniatus C.B.Rob. – Philippines
- Phyllanthus lacunarius F.Muell. – Australia
- Phyllanthus lacunellus Airy Shaw – Australia
- Phyllanthus lamprophyllus Müll.Arg. – Jawa (Madura I.) to Queensland
- Phyllanthus lanceifolius Merr. – Philippines
- Phyllanthus lanceilimbus (Merr.) Merr. – S. Philippines to Queensland
- Phyllanthus lanceolarius (Roxb.) Müll.Arg. – Indian Subcontinent to S. China
- Phyllanthus lanceolatus Poir. – Mauritius
- Phyllanthus lancisepalus (Merr.) Chakrab. & N.P.Balakr. – Myanmar, Borneo
- Phyllanthus lasiogynus Müll.Arg. – Paraguay (Ypanema)
- Phyllanthus latifolius (L.) Sw. – S. Jamaica
- Phyllanthus lativenius (Croizat) Govaerts & Radcl.-Sm. – China (Guizhou)
- Phyllanthus lawii J.Graham – India
- Phyllanthus laxiflorus Benth. – Mexico (Chiapas) to El Salvador
- Phyllanthus lebrunii Robyns & Lawalrée – Rwanda, DR Congo
- Phyllanthus lediformis Jabl. – Venezuela (Amazonas: Cerro Yutajé)
- Phyllanthus leonardianus Lisowski, Malaisse & Symoens – DR Congo
- Phyllanthus leptocaulos Müll.Arg. – Brazil (Minas Gerais)
- Phyllanthus leptoclados Benth. – S. China
- Phyllanthus leptoneurus Urb. – Hispaniola
- Phyllanthus leptophyllus Müll.Arg. – Brazil (Minas Gerais)
- Phyllanthus leschenaultii Müll.Arg. – India to Assam
- Phyllanthus letestui Jean F.Brunel – Central African Rep
- Phyllanthus letouzeyanus Jean F.Brunel – Cameroon
- Phyllanthus leucanthus Pax – Gabon to Djibouti and S. Tropical Africa
- Phyllanthus leucocalyx Hutch. – Kenya to Mozambique
- Phyllanthus leucochlamys Radcl.-Sm. – Tanzania
- Phyllanthus leucogynus Müll.Arg. – Jawa
- Phyllanthus leucosepalus Jean F.Brunel – Kenya
- Phyllanthus leytensis Elmer – Philippines (Leyte)
- Phyllanthus lichenisilvae (Leandri ex Humbert) Petra Hoffm. & McPherson – Central Madagascar (Tsaratanana)
- Phyllanthus liebmannianus Müll.Arg. – Florida, Mexico to Central America
- Phyllanthus liesneri G.L.Webster – N.W. Venezuela
- Phyllanthus ligustrifolius S.Moore – New Caledonia
- Phyllanthus lii Govaerts & Radcl.-Sm. – China (Guangxi)
- Phyllanthus limmuensis Cufod. – South Sudan to S.W. Ethiopia
- Phyllanthus lindbergii Müll.Arg. – S. Tropical America
- Phyllanthus lindenianus Baill. – Cuba to Hispaniola
- Phyllanthus lingulatus Beille – Indo-China
- Phyllanthus littoralis (Blume) Müll.Arg. – S.W. India to Malesia
- Phyllanthus liukiuensis Matsum. ex Hayata – Nansei-shoto (Manzamo-jima, Okinawa-jima)
- Phyllanthus loandensis Welw. ex Müll.Arg. – Central & E. Tropical & S. Africa
- Phyllanthus lobocarpus Benth. – Papua New Guinea to CE. Queensland
- Phyllanthus lokohensis Leandri – N.E. & ENE. Madagascar
- Phyllanthus longfieldiae Ridl. – Tubuai Islands
- Phyllanthus longipedicellatus M.J.Silva – Brazil (Bahia)
- Phyllanthus longiramosus Guillaumin – New Caledonia (Dumbéa-Païta Reg.)
- Phyllanthus longistylus Jabl. – S. Venezuela
- Phyllanthus loranthoides Baill. – New Caledonia
- Phyllanthus lucidus (Blume) Müll.Arg. – Malesia to W. New Guinea
- Phyllanthus luciliae M.Schmid – New Caledonia (Cap Bocage)
- Phyllanthus lunifolius Gilbert & Thulin – Central Somalia
- Phyllanthus lutescens (Blume) Müll.Arg. – S. China to Malesia

=== M ===
- Phyllanthus macgregorii C.B.Rob. – Philippines
- Phyllanthus macphersonii M.Schmid – New Caledonia (Ouaco)
- Phyllanthus macraei Müll.Arg. – S.W. India
- Phyllanthus macranthus Pax – Tanzania to Angola
- Phyllanthus macrocalyx Müll.Arg. – S.W. India
- Phyllanthus macrochorion Baill. – N.W. New Caledonia
- Phyllanthus macrophyllus (Labill.) Müll.Arg. – New Caledonia
- Phyllanthus macrosepalus (Hosok.) W.L.Wagner & Lorence – Caroline Islands
- Phyllanthus madagascariensis Müll.Arg. – S. Central & E. Madagascar
- Phyllanthus madeirensis Croizat – N. Brazil, W. Bolivia
- Phyllanthus maderaspatensis L. – Africa, W. Indian Ocean, Arabian Peninsula, Pakistan to Australia – canoe weed
- Phyllanthus maestrensis Urb. – Cuba (Sierra Maestra)
- Phyllanthus mafingensis Radcl.-Sm. – Malawi (Mafinga Mts.)
- Phyllanthus magdemeanus Jean F.Brunel – Cameroon
- Phyllanthus magnificens Jean F.Brunel & J.P.Roux – Ghana, Togo
- Phyllanthus maguirei Jabl. – Venezuela (Amazonas: Cerro Duida, Cerro de la Neblina)
- Phyllanthus mahengeaensis Jean F.Brunel – Tanzania
- Phyllanthus major Steyerm. – S. Venezuela to Guyana and Brazil (Roraima)
- Phyllanthus makitae Jean F.Brunel – Congo
- Phyllanthus maleolens Urb. & Ekman – Hispaniola
- Phyllanthus mananarensis Leandri – S. Madagascar
- Phyllanthus manausensis W.A.Rodrigues – N. Brazil
- Phyllanthus mandjeliaensis M.Schmid – N.W. New Caledonia
- Phyllanthus mangenotii M.Schmid – Central New Caledonia (Monéo reg.)
- Phyllanthus manicaensis Jean F.Brunel ex Radcl.-Sm. – Mozambique
- Phyllanthus mannianus Müll.Arg. – W. Tropical Africa to Cameroon
- Phyllanthus manono (Baill. ex Müll.Arg.) Müll.Arg. – Society Islands
- Phyllanthus mantadiensis Ralim. & Petra Hoffm. – Madagascar
- Phyllanthus marchionicus (F.Br.) W.L.Wagner & Lorence – Marquesas
- Phyllanthus margaretae M.Schmid – Central New Caledonia (Mt. Aoupinié)
- Phyllanthus mariannensis W.L.Wagner & Lorence – Marianas
- Phyllanthus marianus Müll.Arg. – Marianas
- Phyllanthus maritimus J.J.Sm. – W. New Guinea
- Phyllanthus marojejiensis (Leandri) Petra Hoffm. & McPherson – Central Madagascar (Marojejy Mts.)
- Phyllanthus martii Müll.Arg. – Brazil (Amazonas)
- Phyllanthus martini Radcl.-Sm. – Zambia
- Phyllanthus matitanensis Leandri – N. & E. Madagascar
- Phyllanthus mckenziei Fosberg – Aldabra
- Phyllanthus mcvaughii G.L.Webster – Mexico (Chiapas) to El Salvador
- Phyllanthus megacarpus (Gamble) Kumari & Chandrab. – S.W. India
- Phyllanthus megalanthus C.B.Rob. – Philippines
- Phyllanthus megapodus G.L.Webster – Dominica, Martinique
- Phyllanthus meghalayensis Chakrab. & N.P.Balakr. – Nepal to Thailand and Nansei-shoto
- Phyllanthus melleri Müll.Arg. – Central Madagascar
- Phyllanthus melvilleorum (Airy Shaw) W.L.Wagner & Lorence – Fiji (Viti Levu)
- Phyllanthus memaoyaensis M.Schmid – Central New Caledonia
- Phyllanthus mendesii Jean F.Brunel – Namibia to Zimbabwe
- Phyllanthus mendoncae Jean F.Brunel – Ethiopia to Mozambique
- Phyllanthus meridensis G.L.Webster – Venezuela (Mérida)
- Phyllanthus merinthopodus Diels – New Guinea
- Phyllanthus meuieensis M.Schmid – New Caledonia (Mé Ouié)
- Phyllanthus meyerianus Müll.Arg. – S. Africa
- Phyllanthus mickelii McVaugh – Mexico (Jalisco, Colima)
- Phyllanthus micranthus A.Rich. – S.E. Cuba
- Phyllanthus microcarpus (Benth.) Müll.Arg. – S.E. China to W. Malesia
- Phyllanthus microcladus Müll.Arg. – E. Queensland to E. New South Wales
- Phyllanthus microdendron Müll.Arg. – Angola, Zambia
- Phyllanthus microdictyus Urb. – N.E. Cuba
- Phyllanthus micromeris Radcl.-Sm. – Tanzania to Malawi
- Phyllanthus microphyllinus Müll.Arg. – Angola
- Phyllanthus microphyllus Kunth – Venezuela to Brazil and E. Bolivia
- Phyllanthus mieschii Jean F.Brunel & J.P.Roux – Congo, DR Congo
- Phyllanthus millei Standl. – Ecuador
- Phyllanthus mimicus G.L.Webster – Trinidad-Tobago
- Phyllanthus mimosoides Sw. – Lesser Antilles to Trinidad
- Phyllanthus minahassae Koord. – Sulawesi
- Phyllanthus minarum Standl. & Steyerm. – Guatemala
- Phyllanthus mindorensis C.B.Rob. – Philippines (Mindoro), Sulawesi
- Phyllanthus mindouliensis Jean F.Brunel – Congo
- Phyllanthus minutifolius Jabl. – Venezuela (Amazonas: Cerro Sipapo)
- Phyllanthus minutulus Müll.Arg. – Colombia to Guyana and Brazil
- Phyllanthus mirabilis Müll.Arg. – Indo-China – one of the four succulents, and one of the only two described.
- Phyllanthus mirificus G.L.Webster – N.E. Cuba
- Phyllanthus mitchellii Benth. – Queensland (Leichhardt)
- Phyllanthus mittenianus Hutch. – Kenya (Teita), Tanzania (Uluguru Mts.)
- Phyllanthus mkurirae Jean F.Brunel – Tanzania
- Phyllanthus mocinoanus Baill. – Mexico to W. El Salvador
- Phyllanthus mocotensis G.L.Webster – Brazil (Rio de Janeiro)
- Phyllanthus moeroensis De Wild. – DR Congo
- Phyllanthus moi P.T.Li – China (W. Guangxi)
- Phyllanthus mollis (Blume) Müll.Arg. – Borneo (Sabah), Philippines, Sulawesi, Maluku, Tenimber Islands, Jawa to Lesser Sunda Is
- Phyllanthus monroviae Jean F.Brunel – Liberia
- Phyllanthus montanus (Sw.) Sw. – Jamaica
- Phyllanthus montis-fontium M.Schmid – S.E. New Caledonia
- Phyllanthus montrouzieri Guillaumin – N.W. & W. Central New Caledonia
- Phyllanthus mooneyi M.G.Gilbert – Ethiopia
- Phyllanthus moonii (Thwaites) Müll.Arg. – Sri Lanka
- Phyllanthus moorei M.Schmid – New Caledonia
- Phyllanthus moramangicus (Leandri) Leandri – E. Central Madagascar
- Phyllanthus moratii M.Schmid – N.W. New Caledonia (Tiwaka-Amoa Reg.)
- Phyllanthus mouensis M.Schmid – S.E. New Caledonia
- Phyllanthus mozambicensis Gand. – Mozambique (Delagoa Bay)
- Phyllanthus muellerianus (Kuntze) Exell – Tropical Africa
- Phyllanthus mukerjeeanus D.Mitra & Bennet – India
- Phyllanthus multiflorus Poir. – N. & W. Madagascar
- Phyllanthus multilobus (A.C.Sm.) W.L.Wagner & Lorence – Fiji (Vanua Levu)
- Phyllanthus multilocularis (Roxb. ex Willd.) Müll.Arg. – India to N. Myanmar, Nepal to China (Yunnan)
- Phyllanthus muriculatus J.J.Sm. – Jawa
- Phyllanthus muscosus Ridl. – Peninsula Malaysia
- Phyllanthus mutisianus G.L.Webster – Colombia
- Phyllanthus myrianthus Müll.Arg. – Vanuatu
- Phyllanthus myriophyllus Urb. – S. Haiti
- Phyllanthus myrsinites Kunth – S. Tropical America
- Phyllanthus myrtaceus Sond. – Zimbabwe to S. Africa
- Phyllanthus myrtifolius (Wight) Müll.Arg. – S.W. India, Sri Lanka – mousetail plant
- Phyllanthus myrtilloides Griseb. – E. Cuba

=== N ===
- Phyllanthus nadeaudii (J.Florence) W.L.Wagner & Lorence – Society Islands
- Phyllanthus nanellus P.T.Li – Hainan
- Phyllanthus narayanswamii Gamble – S. India
- Phyllanthus natoensis M.Schmid – New Caledonia (Ponérihouen Reg.)
- Phyllanthus ndikinimekianus Jean F.Brunel – Cameroon
- Phyllanthus neblinae Jabl. – S. Venezuela (Sierra de la Neblina) to Brazil (Serra da Neblina)
- Phyllanthus nemoralis (Thwaites) Müll.Arg. – Sri Lanka
- Phyllanthus neoleonensis Croizat – Mexico (Coahuila, Nuevo León)
- Phyllanthus nhatrangensis Beille – S. Vietnam
- Phyllanthus nigericus Brenan – Nigeria, Bioko
- Phyllanthus nigrescens (Blanco) Müll.Arg. – Philippines
- Phyllanthus niinamii Hayata – Taiwan
- Phyllanthus ningaensis M.Schmid – New Caledonia (Mt. Ninga)
- Phyllanthus niruri L. – Tropical & Subtrop. America – gale of the wind, guinine weed, seed underleaf, stone-breaker
- Phyllanthus niruroides Müll.Arg. – W. Tropical Africa to W. Ethiopia and Angola
- Phyllanthus nitens M.Schmid – New Caledonia (Massif du Boulinda)
- Phyllanthus nitidulus Müll.Arg. – Jawa
- Phyllanthus nothisii M.Schmid – W. Central New Caledonia
- Phyllanthus novae-hollandiae Müll.Arg. – Papua New Guinea to Queensland
- Phyllanthus nozeranianus Jean F.Brunel & J.P.Roux – Ivory Coast
- Phyllanthus nubigenus (Hook.f.) Chakrab. & N.P.Balakr. – Nepal to N. Thailand
- Phyllanthus nummulariifolius Poir. – Africa
- Phyllanthus nummularioides Müll.Arg. – W. Dominican Rep
- Phyllanthus nutans Sw. – Caribbean
- Phyllanthus nyale Petra Hoffm. & Cheek – Cameroon
- Phyllanthus nyikae Radcl.-Sm. – Malawi

=== O ===
- Phyllanthus oaxacanus Brandegee – Mexico (Puebla, Oaxaca)
- Phyllanthus obdeltophyllus Leandri – S.E. Madagascar
- Phyllanthus obfalcatus Lasser & Maguire – S. Venezuela
- Phyllanthus oblanceolatus J.T.Hunter & J.J.Bruhl – Central & E. Central Australia
- Phyllanthus oblatus (Hook.f.) Chakrab. & N.P.Balakr. – Sikkim to China (Yunnan)
- Phyllanthus oblongiglans M.G.Gilbert – Ethiopia
- Phyllanthus obscurus Roxb. ex Willd. – Indo-China to W. & Central Malesia
- Phyllanthus obtusatus (Thunb.) Müll.Arg. – Brazil (Minas Gerais)
- Phyllanthus occidentalis J.T.Hunter & J.J.Bruhl – S.E. Queensland, E. New South Wales
- Phyllanthus octomerus Müll.Arg. – Brazil (Bahia)
- Phyllanthus odontadenioides Jean F.Brunel – Tanzania
- Phyllanthus odontadenius Müll.Arg. – Tropical Africa
- Phyllanthus oligospermus Hayata – S. Nansei-shoto to Taiwan
- Phyllanthus oligotrichus Müll.Arg. – Jawa
- Phyllanthus omahakensis Dinter & Pax – S. Tropical Africa to Namibia
- Phyllanthus oppositifolius Baill. ex Müll.Arg. – Mauritius
- Phyllanthus orbicularifolius (P.T.Li) Govaerts & Radcl.-Sm. – China (Guangxi)
- Phyllanthus orbicularis Kunth – Cuba to Puerto Rico
- Phyllanthus orbiculatus Rich. – Trinidad to S. Tropical America
- Phyllanthus oreichtitus Leandri – Central Madagascar
- Phyllanthus oreophilus Müll.Arg. – Sri Lanka
- Phyllanthus orientalis (Craib) Airy Shaw – N.W. Thailand
- Phyllanthus orinocensis Steyerm. – Venezuela (Amazonas: Cerro Duida)
- Phyllanthus ornatus (Kurz ex Teijsm. & Binn.) Müll.Arg. – Sumatera
- Phyllanthus orohenensis (J.W.Moore) W.L.Wagner & Lorence – Society Islands
- Phyllanthus otobedii W.L.Wagner & Lorence – Caroline Islands
- Phyllanthus ouveanus Däniker – New Caledonia (îs. Loyauté)
- Phyllanthus ovalifolius Forssk. – Tropical Africa, S.W. Arabian Peninsula
- Phyllanthus ovatifolius J.J.Sm. – Maluku (Kep. Kei)
- Phyllanthus ovatus Poir. – Guadeloupe, Martinique, St. Lucia
- Phyllanthus oxycarpus Müll.Arg. – Sumatera
- Phyllanthus oxycoccifolius Hutch. – Tanzania, Angola
- Phyllanthus oxyphyllus Miq. – Myanmar to Sumatera

== P-U ==
=== P ===
- Phyllanthus pachyphyllus Müll.Arg. – Hainan, Indo-China to Singapore, Borneo
- Phyllanthus pachystylus Urb. – E. Cuba to N.W. Haiti
- Phyllanthus pacificus Müll.Arg. – Marquesas
- Phyllanthus pacoensis Thin – Vietnam
- Phyllanthus paezensis Jabl. – Colombia (Vichada), Venezuela (Bolívar)
- Phyllanthus palauensis Hosok. – Caroline Islands
- Phyllanthus panayensis Merr. – Philippines
- Phyllanthus pancherianus Baill. – New Caledonia
- Phyllanthus papenooensis (J.Florence) W.L.Wagner & Lorence – Society Islands
- Phyllanthus papuanus Gage – New Guinea
- Phyllanthus paraguayensis Parodi – Paraguay
- Phyllanthus parainduratus M.Schmid – E. Central & W. Central New Caledonia
- Phyllanthus parangoyensis M.Schmid – New Caledonia (Canala)
- Phyllanthus paraqueensis Jabl. – Venezuela (Amazonas: Cerro Sipapo)
- Phyllanthus parvifolius Buch.-Ham. ex D.Don – N. Pakistan to S. China
- Phyllanthus parvulus Sond. – DR Congo to S. Africa
- Phyllanthus parvus Hutch. – W. & S. Tanzania to S. Tropical Africa
- Phyllanthus paucitepalus M.Schmid – New Caledonia (Col de Mô)
- Phyllanthus pavonianus Baill. – S. Ecuador to N.W. Peru
- Phyllanthus paxianus Dinter – DR Congo, Angolia, Namibia
- Phyllanthus paxii Hutch. – DR Congo, Burundi, Tanzania, Mozambique, Malawi, Zambia, Angola
- Phyllanthus pectinatus Hook.f. – Peninsula Malaysia
- Phyllanthus peltatus Guillaumin – N.W. New Caledonia
- Phyllanthus pendulus Roxb. – Bangladesh
- Phyllanthus peninsularis Brandegee – W. Mexico
- Phyllanthus pentandrus Schumach. & Thonn. – Tropical & S. Africa
- Phyllanthus pentaphyllus C.Wright ex Griseb. – S. Florida, Caribbean to Venezuela
- Phyllanthus pergracilis Gillespie – Fiji (Viti Levu)
- Phyllanthus perpusillus Baill. – Brazil (Minas Gerais, Santa Catarina)
- Phyllanthus perrieri (Leandri) Petra Hoffm. & McPherson – Central Madagascar
- Phyllanthus pervilleanus (Baill.) Müll.Arg. – Seychelles, Comoros, N. Madagascar
- Phyllanthus petaloideus Paul G.Wilson – Mexico (México State)
- Phyllanthus petchikaraensis M.Schmid – New Caledonia (Col de Petchikara)
- Phyllanthus petelotii Croizat – Vietnam
- Phyllanthus petenensis Lundell – Guatemala
- Phyllanthus petraeus A.Chev. & Beille – W. Tropical Africa to Chad
- Phyllanthus philippioides Leandri – Central Madagascar
- Phyllanthus phillyreifolius Poir. – Mascarenes
- Phyllanthus phlebocarpus Urb. – N.E. Cuba
- Phyllanthus phuquocensis Beille – Cambodia to Vietnam
- Phyllanthus physocarpus Müll.Arg. – W. Central Tropical Africa to Kenya and KwaZulu-Natal
- Phyllanthus pierlotii Jean F.Brunel – Togo
- Phyllanthus pileostigma Coode – Mauritius
- Phyllanthus pilifer M.Schmid – New Caledonia
- Phyllanthus pilosus (Lour.) Müll.Arg. – Vietnam
- Phyllanthus pindaiensis M.Schmid – W. Central New Caledonia (Népoui Peninsula)
- Phyllanthus pinifolius Baill. – S.E. Brazil (to Paraná)
- Phyllanthus pinjenensis M.Schmid – N.W. New Caledonia (near Koné)
- Phyllanthus pinnatus (Wight) G.L.Webster – Kenya to Northern Province
- Phyllanthus piranii G.L.Webster – Brazil (Espírito Santo)
- Phyllanthus pireyi Beille – Vietnam
- Phyllanthus pitcairnensis (F.Br.) W.L.Wagner & Lorence – Pitcairn Islands
- Phyllanthus platycalyx Müll.Arg. – New Caledonia
- Phyllanthus podocarpus Müll.Arg. – Fiji (?)
- Phyllanthus poeppigianus (Müll.Arg.) Müll.Arg. – Brazil (Amazonas), Peru (Loreto), N.E. Bolivia
- Phyllanthus pohlianus Müll.Arg. – Brazil (Minas Gerais)
- Phyllanthus poilanei Beille – S. Vietnam
- Phyllanthus poliborealis Airy Shaw – W. New Guinea
- Phyllanthus polygonoides Nutt. ex Spreng. – S.W. Missouri to S.E. New Mexico & N. Mexico – smartweed leafflower
- Phyllanthus polygynus M.Schmid – N.W. New Caledonia
- Phyllanthus polyphyllus Willd. – S. India, Sri Lanka
- Phyllanthus polyspermus Schumach. – Tropical & S. Africa
- Phyllanthus pomiferus Hook.f. – S. Myanmar
- Phyllanthus ponapensis (Hosok.) W.L.Wagner & Lorence – Caroline Islands
- Phyllanthus popayanensis Pax – Colombia
- Phyllanthus poueboensis M.Schmid – N.W. New Caledonia (Pouébo Reg.)
- Phyllanthus poumensis Guillaumin – N.W. New Caledonia
- Phyllanthus praelongipes Airy Shaw & G.L.Webster – Papua New Guinea to Queensland
- Phyllanthus praetervisus Müll.Arg. – E. Himalaya to Myanmar
- Phyllanthus prainianus Collett & Hemsl. – Myanmar
- Phyllanthus procerus C.Wright – Cuba (incl. I. de la Juventud)
- Phyllanthus proctoris G.L.Webster – W. Jamaica
- Phyllanthus profusus N.E.Br. – Guinea to Congo
- Phyllanthus prominulatus J.T.Hunter & J.J.Bruhl – Northern Territory
- Phyllanthus pronyensis Guillaumin – S.E. New Caledonia
- Phyllanthus prostratus Müll.Arg. – Angola, Zimbabwe
- Phyllanthus pseudocarunculatus Radcl.-Sm. – S. DR Congo, Zambia
- Phyllanthus pseudocicca Griseb. – E. Cuba
- Phyllanthus pseudoguyanensis Herter & Mansf. – Uruguay
- Phyllanthus pseudoniruri Müll.Arg. – Cameroon to Somalia and Botswana
- Phyllanthus pseudoparvifolius R.L.Mitra & Sanjappa – Bhutan to Assam (Meghalaya)
- Phyllanthus pseudotrichopodus M.Schmid – E. Central New Caledonia (Houaïlou to Touho)
- Phyllanthus pterocladus S.Moore – N.W. New Caledonia
- Phyllanthus puberus (L.) Müll.Arg. – China, Taiwan, Japan (Kyushu)
- Phyllanthus pulcher Wall. ex Müll.Arg. – China (Yunnan, Guangxi) to W. Malesia – tropical leafflower
- Phyllanthus pulcherrimus Herter ex Arechav. – Uruguay
- Phyllanthus pulchroides Beille – Indo-China
- Phyllanthus pullenii Airy Shaw & G.L.Webster – New Guinea
- Phyllanthus pulverulentus Urb. – S.E. Cuba
- Phyllanthus pumilus (Blanco) Müll.Arg. – Philippines
- Phyllanthus puncticulatus Jean F.Brunel – Ethiopia
- Phyllanthus puntii G.L.Webster – Brazil (Acre), W. Bolivia
- Phyllanthus purpureus Müll.Arg. – Angola, Namibia
- Phyllanthus purpusii Brandegee – Mexico (Oaxaca, Chiapas)
- Phyllanthus pycnophyllus Müll.Arg. – S. Venezuela to Guyana

=== Q–R ===
- Phyllanthus quintuplinervis M.Schmid – S. Central New Caledonia
- Phyllanthus racemigerus Müll.Arg. – Venezuela
- Phyllanthus raiateaensis W.L.Wagner & Lorence – Society Islands
- Phyllanthus raivavensis (F.Br.) W.L.Wagner & Lorence – Tubuai Islands
- Phyllanthus ramillosus Müll.Arg. – S. Brazil to N. Argentina
- Phyllanthus ramosii Quisumb. & Merr. – Philippines
- Phyllanthus ramosus Vell. – S.E. Brazil
- Phyllanthus rangachariarii Murugan, Kabeer & G.V.S.Murthy – India (Tamil Nadu)
- Phyllanthus rangoloakensis Leandri – E. Central & S.E. Madagascar
- Phyllanthus rapaensis (J.Florence) W.L.Wagner & Lorence – Tubuai Islands
- Phyllanthus raynalii Jean F.Brunel & J.P.Roux – Cameroon
- Phyllanthus reinwardtii Müll.Arg. – Jawa
- Phyllanthus reticulatus Poir. – Tropical & Subtrop. Asia to N. Australia – kajibajiba, potatobush
- Phyllanthus retinervis Hutch. – Tanzania to Zambia
- Phyllanthus retroflexus Brade – Brazil (Bahia, Espírito Santo)
- Phyllanthus revaughanii Coode – Mozambique Channel Islands
- Phyllanthus rhabdocarpus Müll.Arg. – Jawa
- Phyllanthus rheedei Wight – E. Himalaya to Sri Lanka
- Phyllanthus rheophilus Airy Shaw – Papua New Guinea
- Phyllanthus rheophyticus M.G.Gilbert & P.T.Li – Hainan
- Phyllanthus rhizomatosus Radcl.-Sm. – Tanzania (Morogoro)
- Phyllanthus rhodocladus S.Moore – New Caledonia (E. Ignambi)
- Phyllanthus ridleyanus Airy Shaw – S. Thailand to Peninsula Malaysia
- Phyllanthus riedelianus Müll.Arg. – S.E. & S. Brazil
- Phyllanthus rivae Pax – DR Congo, Ethiopia
- Phyllanthus robinsonii Merr. – Philippines
- Phyllanthus robustus Mart. ex Colla – Brazil (Rio de Janeiro)
- Phyllanthus roseus (Craib & Hutch.) Beille – China (Yunnan) to Peninsula Malaysia
- Phyllanthus rosmarinifolius Müll.Arg. – Brazil (Rio de Janeiro: Serra dos Órgãos)
- Phyllanthus rosselensis Airy Shaw & G.L.Webster – New Guinea (Louisiade Arch.)
- Phyllanthus rotundifolius J.G.Klein ex Willd. – Cape Verde, Tropical Africa, Arabian Peninsula, Pakistan to Sri Lanka
- Phyllanthus rouxii Jean F.Brunel – Ghana, Togo
- Phyllanthus rozennae M.Schmid – New Caledonia (S. I. Art)
- Phyllanthus ruber (Lour.) Spreng. – Hainan, Vietnam
- Phyllanthus ruber (Blume) T.Kuros. – Tropical & Subtrop. Asia
- Phyllanthus rubescens Beille – Indo-China
- Phyllanthus rubicundus Beille – Vietnam
- Phyllanthus rubriflorus J.J.Sm. – New Guinea
- Phyllanthus rubristipulus Govaerts & Radcl.-Sm. – Vietnam
- Phyllanthus rufuschaneyi Welzen, R.W.Bouman & Ent - Sabah
- Phyllanthus rufoglaucus Müll.Arg. – Jawa
- Phyllanthus rupestris Kunth – Colombia to N. Brazil
- Phyllanthus rupicola Elmer – Philippines
- Phyllanthus rupiinsularis Hosok. – Caroline Islands
- Phyllanthus ruscifolius Müll.Arg. – Colombia (Valle del Cauca)

=== S ===
- Phyllanthus saffordii Merr. – Marianas
- Phyllanthus salesiae M.J.Silva – Brazil (Minas Gerais)
- Phyllanthus salicifolius Baill. – N.W. New Caledonia
- Phyllanthus salomonis Airy Shaw – New Guinea (Louisiade Arch.) to Santa Cruz Islands
- Phyllanthus salviifolius Kunth – Costa Rica to N.W. Venezuela and Peru
- Phyllanthus samarensis Müll.Arg. – Philippines (Samar), Sulawesi
- Phyllanthus sambiranensis Leandri – Madagascar
- Phyllanthus samoanus (Müll.Arg.) W.L.Wagner & Lorence – Samoa, Niue
- Phyllanthus sanjappae Chakrab. & M.Gangop. – Andaman Islands
- Phyllanthus sarasinii Guillaumin – Central New Caledonia
- Phyllanthus sarothamnoides Govaerts & Radcl.-Sm. – Brazil (Bahia: Serra da Lapa)
- Phyllanthus sauropodoides Airy Shaw – Queensland
- Phyllanthus savannicola Domin – Queensland
- Phyllanthus saxosus F.Muell. – Western Australia, South Australia
- Phyllanthus scaber Klotzsch – W. & S. Western Australia
- Phyllanthus scabrifolius Hook.f. – W. & S. India
- Phyllanthus schaulsii Jean F.Brunel – Cameroon
- Phyllanthus schliebenii Mansf. ex Radcl.-Sm. – Tanzania (Lindi)
- Phyllanthus scopulorum (Britton) Urb. – N.E. Cuba
- Phyllanthus securinegoides Merr. – Philippines
- Phyllanthus seemannii (Müll.Arg.) Müll.Arg. – Fiji
- Phyllanthus selbyi Britton & P.Wilson – Cuba (incl. I. de la Juventud)
- Phyllanthus sellowianus (Klotzsch) Müll.Arg. – S. Brazil to Paraguay
- Phyllanthus semicordatus Müll.Arg. – Jawa
- Phyllanthus senyavinianus (Glassman) W.L.Wagner & Lorence – Caroline Islands
- Phyllanthus sepialis Müll.Arg. – South Sudan to Tanzania
- Phyllanthus serandii Jean F.Brunel – Guinea
- Phyllanthus sericeus (Blume) Müll.Arg. – S. Indo-China to W. Malesia and Philippines (Palawan)
- Phyllanthus serpentinicola Radcl.-Sm. – Zimbabwe
- Phyllanthus serpentinus S.Moore – N.W. New Caledonia
- Phyllanthus sessilis Warb. – New Guinea
- Phyllanthus shabaensis Jean F.Brunel – S. DR Congo
- Phyllanthus sibuyanensis Elmer – Philippines
- Phyllanthus sieboldianus T.Kuros. – Japan (S. Honshu, Shikoku, Kyushu) to Nansei-shoto
- Phyllanthus sikkimensis Müll.Arg. – Nepal to N. Peninsula Malaysia
- Phyllanthus similis Müll.Arg. – Queensland, New South Wales
- Phyllanthus simplicicaulis Müll.Arg. – Brazil (Minas Gerais)
- Phyllanthus sincorensis G.L.Webster – Brazil (Bahia)
- Phyllanthus singalensis (Miq.) Müll.Arg. – Sumatera
- Phyllanthus singampattianus (Sebast. & A.N.Henry) Kumari & Chandrab. – S. India (Tirunelveli Distr.)
- Phyllanthus skutchii Standl. – S. Costa Rica
- Phyllanthus smithianus G.L.Webster – Fiji
- Phyllanthus societatis Müll.Arg. – S. Pacific
- Phyllanthus somalensis Hutch. – S. Somalia, N.E. Kenya
- Phyllanthus songboiensis Thin – Vietnam
- Phyllanthus sootepensis Craib – China (S. Yunnan) to N. Thailand
- Phyllanthus spartioides Pax & K.Hoffm. – Brazil (Bahia, Minas Gerais, Goiás)
- Phyllanthus sphaerogynus Müll.Arg. – E. Himalaya to S. China
- Phyllanthus spinosus Chiov. – Somalia
- Phyllanthus spirei Beille – Laos
- Phyllanthus sponiifolius Müll.Arg. – Colombia to Ecuador
- Phyllanthus spruceanus Müll.Arg. – Brazil (Amazonas)
- Phyllanthus squamifolius (Lour.) Stokes – Vietnam
- Phyllanthus st-johnii W.L.Wagner & Lorence – Society Islands
- Phyllanthus standleyi McVaugh – Mexico (Sinaloa to Michoacán)
- Phyllanthus stellatus Retz. – Sri Lanka
- Phyllanthus stenophyllus Guillaumin – New Caledonia (Poindimié-Touho)
- Phyllanthus stipitatus M.Schmid – N. Central New Caledonia (Massif du Boulinda)
- Phyllanthus stipularis Merr. – Philippines
- Phyllanthus stipulatus (Raf.) G.L.Webster – Mexico to Tropical America
- Phyllanthus striaticaulis J.T.Hunter & J.J.Bruhl – South Australia
- Phyllanthus strobilaceus Jabl. – S. Venezuela
- Phyllanthus stultitiae Airy Shaw – W. New Guinea
- Phyllanthus stylosus Griff. – Nepal to Assam
- Phyllanthus subapicalis Jabl. – S. Venezuela to Brazil (Roraima)
- Phyllanthus subcarnosus C.Wright ex Griseb. – Cuba, Haiti
- Phyllanthus subcrenulatus F.Muell. – Queensland, New South Wales
- Phyllanthus subcuneatus Greenm. – Mexico
- Phyllanthus subemarginatus Müll.Arg. – E. & S. Brazil
- Phyllanthus sublanatus Schumach. & Thonn. – W. Tropical Africa to Chad
- Phyllanthus submarginalis Airy Shaw – Lesser Sunda Islands
- Phyllanthus submollis K.Schum. & Lauterb. – New Guinea
- Phyllanthus subobscurus Müll.Arg. – Jawa
- Phyllanthus subsessilis (N.P.Balakr. & Chakr.) Chakrab. & N.P.Balakr. – Andaman Islands
- Phyllanthus suffrutescens Pax – S. Ethiopia, Somalia, Kenya, Uganda, Tanzania
- Phyllanthus sulcatus J.T.Hunter & J.J.Bruhl – Northern Territory, Queensland
- Phyllanthus superbus (Baill. ex Müll.Arg.) Müll.Arg. – Peninsula Thailand to W. Malesia
- Phyllanthus sylvincola S.Moore – S.E. New Caledonia
- Phyllanthus symphoricarpoides Kunth – Colombia to Peru

=== T ===
- Phyllanthus tabularis Airy Shaw – Papua New Guinea
- Phyllanthus tagulae Airy Shaw & G.L.Webster – New Guinea (Louisiade Arch.)
- Phyllanthus taitensis (Baill. ex Müll.Arg.) Müll.Arg. – Cook Islands, Society Is., Marquesas
- Phyllanthus talbotii Sedgw. – S.W. India (Goa, Karnataka)
- Phyllanthus tanaensis Jean F.Brunel – Kenya
- Phyllanthus tangoensis M.Schmid – New Caledonia (Plateau de Tango)
- Phyllanthus tanzanianus Jean F.Brunel – Tanzania
- Phyllanthus tanzaniensis Jean F.Brunel – Tanzania
- Phyllanthus taxodiifolius Beille – China (S. Yunnan, S.W. Guangxi) to Indo-China
- Phyllanthus taylorianus Jean F.Brunel – Cameroon to Ethiopia and Zimbabwe
- Phyllanthus temehaniensis (J.W.Moore) W.L.Wagner & Lorence – Society Islands
- Phyllanthus tenellus Roxb. – Tanzania to Mozambique, S.W. Arabian Peninsula, W. Indian Ocean – Mascarene island leafflower
- Phyllanthus tener Radcl.-Sm. – Zambia
- Phyllanthus tenuicaulis Müll.Arg. – E. Cuba, Haiti
- Phyllanthus tenuipedicellatus M.Schmid – New Caledonia
- Phyllanthus tenuipes C.B.Rob. – Philippines
- Phyllanthus tenuirhachis J.J.Sm. – Sulawesi to W. New Guinea
- Phyllanthus tenuis Radcl.-Sm. – Zambia
- Phyllanthus tepuicola Steyerm. – Venezuela (Amazonas: Cerro Duida)
- Phyllanthus tequilensis B.L.Rob. & Greenm. – Mexico
- Phyllanthus tessmannii Hutch. – São Tomé, Equatorial Guinea
- Phyllanthus tetrandrus Roxb. – Assam to Bangladesh
- Phyllanthus thaii Thin – Vietnam
- Phyllanthus thomsonii Müll.Arg. – S.E. Tibet to Bangladesh
- Phyllanthus thulinii Radcl.-Sm. – Tanzania (Morogoro)
- Phyllanthus tiebaghiensis M.Schmid – N.W. New Caledonia (Massif de la Tiébaghi)
- Phyllanthus tireliae M.Schmid – New Caledonia (Massif du Boulinda)
- Phyllanthus tixieri M.Schmid – New Caledonia (Kouaoua Reg.)
- Phyllanthus torrentium Müll.Arg. – New Caledonia
- Phyllanthus touranensis Beille – Vietnam
- Phyllanthus triandrus (Blanco) Müll.Arg. – N. & Central Philippines
- Phyllanthus trichogynus (Müll.Arg.) Müll.Arg. – Philippines
- Phyllanthus trichopodus Guillaumin – New Caledonia (Touho Reg.)
- Phyllanthus trichosporus Adelb. – Jawa, Sulawesi
- Phyllanthus trichotepalus Brenan – South Sudan to Burundi
- Phyllanthus triphlebius C.B.Rob. – Philippines
- Phyllanthus tritepalus M.Schmid – E. Central New Caledonia (Canala)
- Phyllanthus trungii Thin – Vietnam
- Phyllanthus tsarongensis W.W.Sm. – Tibet, China (Sichuan, Yunnan)
- Phyllanthus tsetserrae Jean F.Brunel – Mozambique
- Phyllanthus tuamotuensis (J.Florence) W.L.Wagner & Lorence – Tuamotu (Niau, Taravai)
- Phyllanthus tuerckheimii G.L.Webster – Mexico (Oaxaca, Chiapas) to Guatemala
- Phyllanthus tukuyuanus Jean F.Brunel – Tanzania

=== U ===
- Phyllanthus udoricola Radcl.-Sm. – Malawi, Zambia, Zimbabwe
- Phyllanthus ukagurensis Radcl.-Sm. – N.E. Tanzania
- Phyllanthus umbratus Müll.Arg. – S.E. Brazil
- Phyllanthus umbricola Guillaumin – S.E. New Caledonia
- Phyllanthus unifoliatus M.Schmid – W. Central New Caledonia (Pindai Peninsula)
- Phyllanthus unioensis M.Schmid – S. Central New Caledonia (Table Unio)
- Phyllanthus upembaensis Jean F.Brunel – DR Congo
- Phyllanthus urbanianus Mansf. – Haiti (Massif de la Hotte)
- Phyllanthus urceolatus Baill. – Society Islands
- Phyllanthus urinaria L. – Tropical & Subtrop. Asia to N. Australia – chamberbitter, longstalked phyllanthus
- Phyllanthus ussuriensis Rupr. & Maxim. – Mongolia, Russian Far East to Japan and Taiwan
- Phyllanthus utricularis Airy Shaw & G.L.Webster – W. New Guinea

== V-Z ==
=== V ===
- Phyllanthus vacciniifolius (Müll.Arg.) Müll.Arg. – S. Venezuela to Guyana and N. Brazil
- Phyllanthus vakinankaratrae Leandri – Central Madagascar
- Phyllanthus valerioi Standl. – Costa Rica
- Phyllanthus valleanus Croizat – Colombia
- Phyllanthus vanderystii Hutch. & De Wild. – DR Congo
- Phyllanthus varians (Miq.) Müll.Arg. – Sumatera
- Phyllanthus vatovaviensis Leandri ex Ralim. & Petra Hoffm. – E. Madagascar
- Phyllanthus veillonii M.Schmid – New Caledonia (S. I. Art)
- Phyllanthus velutinus (Wight) Müll.Arg. – Pakistan to China (Yunnan)
- Phyllanthus ventricosus G.L.Webster – Peru (Loreto)
- Phyllanthus ventuarii Jabl. – Venezuela (Amazonas: Cerro Parú)
- Phyllanthus venustulus Leandri – Central Madagascar
- Phyllanthus vergens Baill. – N. Madagascar
- Phyllanthus verrucicaulis Airy Shaw – New Guinea to Bismarck Arch
- Phyllanthus vespertilio Baill. – New Caledonia (Canala, Col d'Amos)
- Phyllanthus vichadensis Croizat – Colombia
- Phyllanthus villosus Poir. – S. China
- Phyllanthus vincentae J.F.Macbr. – Peru (Loreto)
- Phyllanthus virgatus G.Forst. – Tropical & Subtrop. Asia to S.W. Pacific
- Phyllanthus virgulatus Müll.Arg. – DR Congo, Angola, Zambia, Malawi
- Phyllanthus virgultiramus Däniker – N.W. New Caledonia (Massif du Koniambo)
- Phyllanthus viridis M.E.Jones – Mexico (Baja California)
- Phyllanthus vitiensis Müll.Arg. – Fiji
- Phyllanthus vitilevuensis W.L.Wagner & Lorence – Fiji (Viti Levu)
- Phyllanthus volkensii Engl. – Kenya to Tanzania
- Phyllanthus vulcani Guillaumin – E. Central & S.E. New Caledonia

=== W ===
- Phyllanthus wallichianus (Müll.Arg.) Müll.Arg. – Peninsula Thailand to W. Malesia
- Phyllanthus warburgii K.Schum. – New Guinea
- Phyllanthus warnockii G.L.Webster – S.W. & Central U.S. to N.E. Mexico – sand reverchonia
- Phyllanthus watsonii Airy Shaw – Peninsula Malaysia
- Phyllanthus websteri (Fosberg) W.L.Wagner & Lorence – Caroline Islands
- Phyllanthus websterianus Steyerm. – Brazil (Goiás)
- Phyllanthus welwitschianus Müll.Arg. – Tropical Africa, Indo-China
- Phyllanthus wheeleri G.L.Webster – Sri Lanka
- Phyllanthus wightianus Müll.Arg. – S.W. India
- Phyllanthus wilderi (J.Florence) W.L.Wagner & Lorence – Tuamotu (Mangareva, Makatea)
- Phyllanthus wilkesianus Müll.Arg. – Fiji (Viti Levu, Vanua Levu)
- Phyllanthus williamioides Griseb. – E. Cuba (Sierra Sagua Baracoa)
- Phyllanthus wingfieldii Radcl.-Sm. – E. Tanzania
- Phyllanthus wittei Robyns & Lawalrée – DR Congo to Burundi
- Phyllanthus womersleyi Airy Shaw & G.L.Webster – Papua New Guinea
- Phyllanthus wrightii (Benth.) Müll.Arg. – S. China to Hainan

=== X–Z ===
- Phyllanthus xerocarpus O.Schwarz – N. Borneo to Northern Territory
- Phyllanthus xiphophorus Jean F.Brunel – N. Zambia
- Phyllanthus xylorrhizus Thulin – N.E. Somalia
- Phyllanthus yangambiensis Jean F.Brunel – DR Congo
- Phyllanthus yaouhensis Schltr. – New Caledonia (Nouméa)
- Phyllanthus youngii Jean F.Brunel – Angola
- Phyllanthus yunnanensis (Croizat) Govaerts & Radcl.-Sm. – China (Guizhou, Yunnan)
- Phyllanthus yvettae M.Schmid – E. Central & S.E. New Caledonia
- Phyllanthus zambicus Radcl.-Sm. – Zambia
- Phyllanthus zanthoxyloides Steyerm. – Venezuela (Monagas)
- Phyllanthus zippelianus Müll.Arg. – Lesser Sunda Islands
- Phyllanthus zornioides Radcl.-Sm. – Malawi, Zambia, Zimbabwe
