= List of Glochidion species =

Glochidion is a genus of flowering plants in the family Phyllanthaceae. As of April 2025, Plants of the World Online accepts the following 169 species:

== A ==
- Glochidion anamiticum (Kuntze) Merr.
- Glochidion auii Airy Shaw
- Glochidion azaleon Airy Shaw

== B ==
- Glochidion bachmaense Thin
- Glochidion balansae Beille
- Glochidion barronense Airy Shaw
- Glochidion beccarii Airy Shaw
- Glochidion beehleri W.N.Takeuchi
- Glochidion beguinii Airy Shaw
- Glochidion benguetense Elmer
- Glochidion benthamianum Domin
- Glochidion borgmannii Airy Shaw
- Glochidion brideliifolium Airy Shaw
- Glochidion brooksii Ridl.
- Glochidion bullatissimum Airy Shaw
- Glochidion butonicum Airy Shaw

== C ==
- Glochidion cacuminum Müll.Arg.
- Glochidion cagayanense C.B.Rob.
- Glochidion caloneurum Airy Shaw
- Glochidion calospermum Airy Shaw
- Glochidion camiguinense Merr.
- Glochidion canescens Elmer
- Glochidion carrickii Airy Shaw
- Glochidion carrii Airy Shaw
- Glochidion castaneum Airy Shaw
- Glochidion cauliflorum Merr.
- Glochidion cenabrei Merr.
- Glochidion chevalieri Beille
- Glochidion chlamydogyne Airy Shaw
- Glochidion chodoense C.S.Lee & H.T.Im
- Glochidion chondrocarpum Airy Shaw
- Glochidion collectorum Airy Shaw
- Glochidion conostylum Airy Shaw
- Glochidion coronulatum C.B.Rob.
- Glochidion cupreum Airy Shaw
- Glochidion curranii C.B.Rob.

== D ==
- Glochidion daviesii W.N.Takeuchi
- Glochidion decorum J.J.Sm.
- Glochidion delticola Airy Shaw
- Glochidion dichromum Airy Shaw
- Glochidion discogyne Airy Shaw
- Glochidion disparilaterum S.Moore
- Glochidion disparipes Airy Shaw
- Glochidion dodecapterum Airy Shaw
- Glochidion dolichostylum Merr.
- Glochidion drypetifolium Airy Shaw
- Glochidion dumicola Airy Shaw

== E ==
- Glochidion elaphrocarpum Airy Shaw
- Glochidion elmeri Merr.
- Glochidion eucleoides S.Moore

== F ==
- Glochidion falcatilimbum Merr.
- Glochidion formanii Airy Shaw
- Glochidion frodinii Airy Shaw

== G ==
- Glochidion galorii Airy Shaw
- Glochidion geoffrayi Beille
- Glochidion glabrum J.J.Sm.
- Glochidion glaucescens Merr.
- Glochidion glaucops Airy Shaw
- Glochidion goniocarpum Hook.f.
- Glochidion goniocladum Airy Shaw
- Glochidion gracile Airy Shaw
- Glochidion granulare Airy Shaw
- Glochidion grossum Airy Shaw

== H ==
- Glochidion harveyanum Domin
- Glochidion heterocalyx Airy Shaw
- Glochidion humile Merr.
- Glochidion huntii Airy Shaw
- Glochidion hylandii Airy Shaw

== I ==
- Glochidion impuber (Roxb.) Govaerts
- Glochidion insectum Airy Shaw
- Glochidion intercastellanum Airy Shaw

== K ==
- Glochidion katikii Airy Shaw
- Glochidion kerangae Airy Shaw
- Glochidion kopiaginis Airy Shaw
- Glochidion kostermansii Airy Shaw
- Glochidion kunstlerianum Gage

== L ==
- Glochidion lalae Airy Shaw
- Glochidion lambiricum Airy Shaw
- Glochidion lanceolatum Hayata
- Glochidion lanyuense Gang Yao & S.X.Luo
- Glochidion latistylum C.B.Rob.
- Glochidion leptostylum Airy Shaw
- Glochidion leucocarpum Airy Shaw
- Glochidion ligulatum C.B.Rob.
- Glochidion loerzingii Airy Shaw
- Glochidion longistylum C.B.Rob.
- Glochidion luzonense Elmer

== M ==
- Glochidion macrostigma Hook.f.
- Glochidion maingayi Gage
- Glochidion malindangense C.B.Rob.
- Glochidion malingheense C.Y.Deng & Gang Yao
- Glochidion medogense T.L.Chin
- Glochidion mehipitense Pax & K.Hoffm.
- Glochidion meijeri Airy Shaw
- Glochidion merrillii C.B.Rob.
- Glochidion mindorense C.B.Rob.
- Glochidion mitrastylum Airy Shaw
- Glochidion monostylum Airy Shaw
- Glochidion mop Airy Shaw
- Glochidion muelleri Briq.
- Glochidion muscisilvae Airy Shaw

== N ==
- Glochidion namilo Guillaumin
- Glochidion nervosum Alston
- Glochidion nesophilum Airy Shaw
- Glochidion nobile Airy Shaw
- Glochidion nothofageticum Airy Shaw
- Glochidion novae-georgiae Airy Shaw
- Glochidion novoguineense K.Schum.

== O ==
- Glochidion oblongifolium Airy Shaw
- Glochidion oogynum Airy Shaw
- Glochidion oxygonum Airy Shaw

== P ==
- Glochidion pachyconum Airy Shaw
- Glochidion palawanense Elmer
- Glochidion paludicola (Airy Shaw) Airy Shaw
- Glochidion peltiferum S.Moore
- Glochidion phellocarpum Airy Shaw
- Glochidion philippicum (Cav.) C.B.Rob.
- Glochidion phyllanthoides Merr.
- Glochidion phyllochlamys Airy Shaw
- Glochidion plagiophyllum Airy Shaw
- Glochidion pleiosepalum Airy Shaw
- Glochidion pomiferum Airy Shaw
- Glochidion praeclarum Airy Shaw
- Glochidion prinoides S.Moore
- Glochidion pruinosum Airy Shaw
- Glochidion psidioides C.B.Rob.
- Glochidion pubicapsa Airy Shaw
- Glochidion pulgarense Elmer
- Glochidion punctatum Pax & K.Hoffm.
- Glochidion pungens Airy Shaw
- Glochidion pyriforme Airy Shaw

== R ==
- Glochidion ramiflorum J.R.Forst. & G.Forst.
- Glochidion reticulatum Elmer
- Glochidion retinerve Airy Shaw
- Glochidion robinsonii Elmer
- Glochidion rugulosum Airy Shaw
- Glochidion runikerae Airy Shaw

== S ==
- Glochidion saccocarpum Airy Shaw
- Glochidion santisukii Airy Shaw
- Glochidion sessiliflorum Airy Shaw
- Glochidion singaporense Gage
- Glochidion stenophyllum Airy Shaw
- Glochidion stipulare Airy Shaw
- Glochidion striatum J.J.Sm.
- Glochidion styliferum J.J.Sm.
- Glochidion stylosum Ridl.
- Glochidion subfalcatum Elmer
- Glochidion symingtonii Airy Shaw

== T ==
- Glochidion talakonense Sankara Rao, J.Swamy, Nagaraju, S.B.Padal, M.Tarak.Naidu, K.
- Glochidion talmyanum Beille
- Glochidion tenuistylum Stapf
- Glochidion ternateum Airy Shaw
- Glochidion tetrapteron Gage
- Glochidion timorense Airy Shaw
- Glochidion trichophorum Merr.
- Glochidion trusanicum Airy Shaw

== U ==
- Glochidion ultrabasicola Airy Shaw
- Glochidion urceolare Airy Shaw
- Glochidion urophylloides Elmer

== W ==
- Glochidion weberi C.B.Rob.
- Glochidion welzenii W.N.Takeuchi
- Glochidion williamsii C.B.Rob.
- Glochidion wilsonii Hutch.
- Glochidion wisselense Airy Shaw
- Glochidion wonenggau Airy Shaw
- Glochidion woodii Merr.

== X ==
- Glochidion xestophyllum Airy Shaw

== Y ==
- Glochidion yangchunense Z.Q.Song & Gang Yao

== Z ==
- Glochidion zollingeri Miq.
