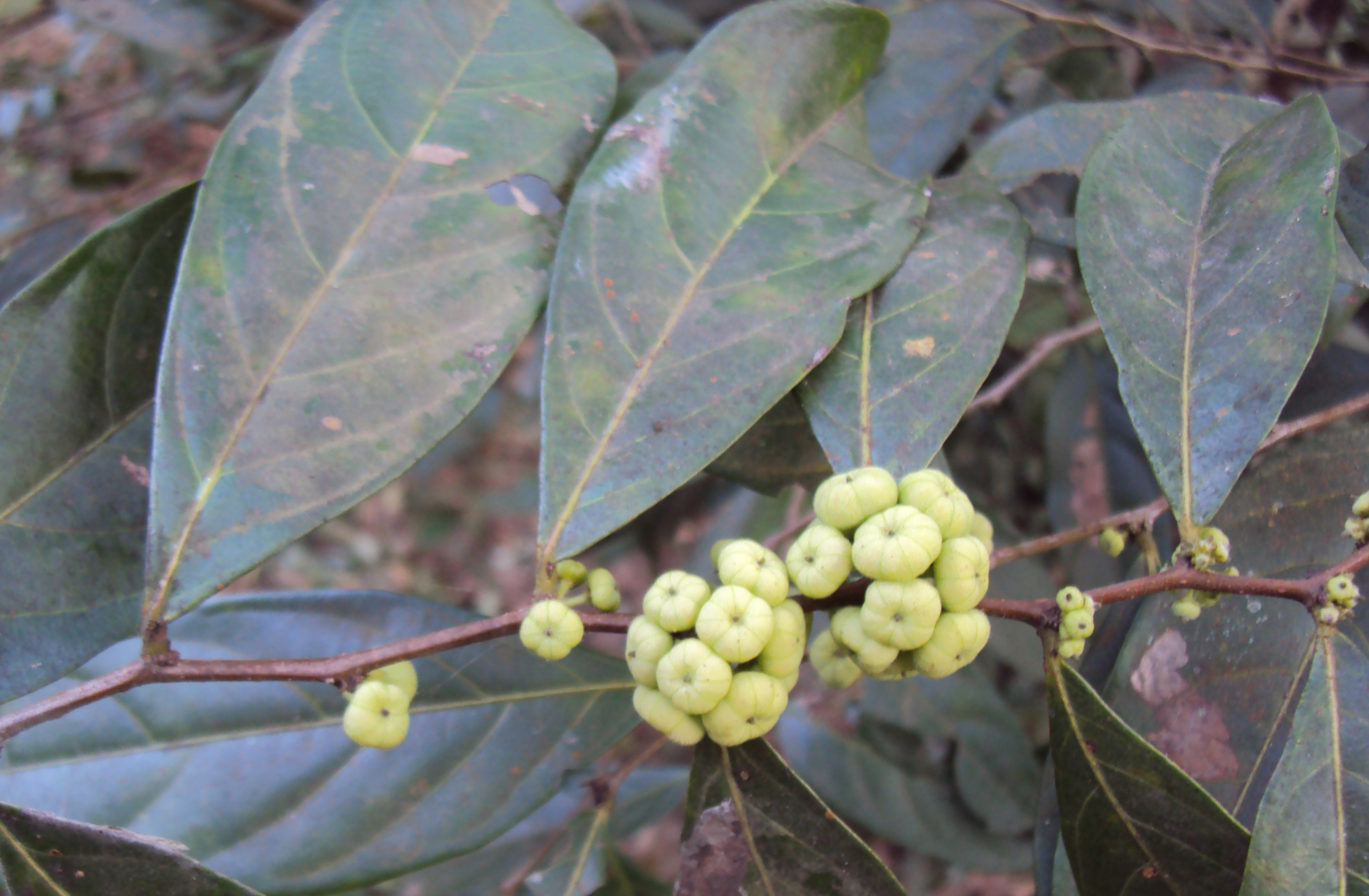
- Foliage and fruit

Scientific classification
- Kingdom: Plantae
- Clade: Tracheophytes
- Clade: Angiosperms
- Clade: Eudicots
- Clade: Rosids
- Order: Malpighiales
- Family: Phyllanthaceae
- Genus: Phyllanthus
- Species: P. puber

Binomial name
- Phyllanthus puber (L.) Müll.Arg.

Synonyms
- Agyneia impubes L.; Agyneia pinnata Miq.; Agyneia pubera L.; Agyneia sinica Miq.; Bradleia pubera (L.) Roxb.; Bradleia sinica Gaertn.; Glochidion distichum Hance; Glochidion hayatae var. tsushimense Hurus.; Glochidion pseudo-obscurum Pamp.; Glochidion puberum (L.) Hutch.; Glochidion sinicum (Gaertn.) Hook. & Arn.

= Phyllanthus puber =

Species of flowering plant

Phyllanthus puber is a species of shrub or small tree in the family Phyllanthaceae. It is native to China, where it is widely distributed in both subtropical and temperate regions (Anhui, Fujian, Gansu, Guangdong, Guizhou, Hainan, Henan, Hubei, Hunan, Jiangsu, Jiangxi, Shaanxi, Sichuan, Yunnan, and Zhejiang provinces and Tibet and Guangxi autonomous regions). It has also been reported from Taiwan and Japan, and is morphologically very similar to the species Glochidion chodoense, endemic to southern South Korea. In Mandarin it is known as 算盘子 (suanpanzi), which also refers to the genera Glochidion and Phyllanthus as a whole. In China it is used for medicinal purposes.

This species has become naturalized at several locations in Alabama in the United States.

The species was first described as Agyneia pubera by Carl Linnaeus in 1771. In 1865 Johannes Müller Argoviensis placed the species in genus Phyllanthus as P. puber.
