= Glochidion stylosum =

Conservation status
- Data Deficient (IUCN 3.1)

Scientific classification
- Kingdom: Plantae
- Clade: Tracheophytes
- Clade: Angiosperms
- Clade: Eudicots
- Clade: Rosids
- Order: Malpighiales
- Family: Phyllanthaceae
- Genus: Glochidion
- Species: G. stylosum

Binomial name
- Glochidion stylosum Ridl.

Species of tree

Glochidion stylosum is a species of flowering plant in the family Phyllanthaceae. It is a tree endemic to Peninsular Malaysia. It is threatened by habitat loss.
