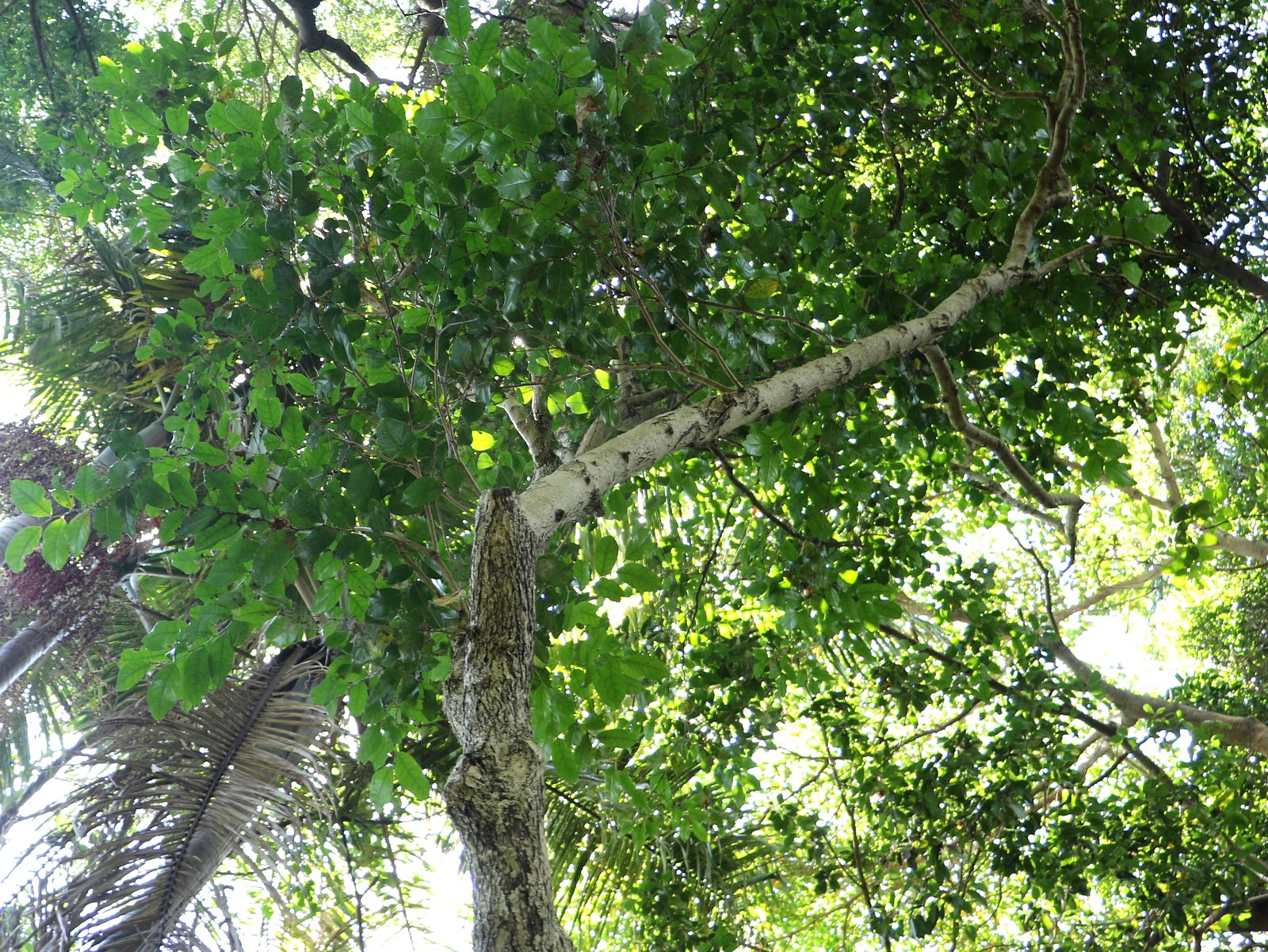
- Royal Botanic Gardens Sydney

Scientific classification
- Kingdom: Plantae
- Clade: Tracheophytes
- Clade: Angiosperms
- Clade: Eudicots
- Clade: Rosids
- Order: Malpighiales
- Family: Phyllanthaceae
- Genus: Glochidion
- Species: G. harveyanum

Binomial name
- Glochidion harveyanum Domin

= Glochidion harveyanum =

Species of flowering plant

Glochidion harveyanum known as the buttonwood or Harvey's buttonwood is a shrub or small tree in the family Phyllanthaceae. It is found in tropical north eastern Australia and Papua New Guinea in drier rainforest areas, from coastal areas to 1,000 metres above sea level.
