= Phyllanthus pitcairnensis =

Conservation status
- Endangered (IUCN 3.1)

Scientific classification
- Kingdom: Plantae
- Clade: Tracheophytes
- Clade: Angiosperms
- Clade: Eudicots
- Clade: Rosids
- Order: Malpighiales
- Family: Phyllanthaceae
- Genus: Phyllanthus
- Species: P. pitcairnensis

Binomial name
- Phyllanthus pitcairnensis (F.Br.) W.L.Wagner & Lorence

Synonyms
- Glochidion pitcairnense (F.Br.) H.St.John; Glochidion taitense var. pitcairnense F.Br.

Usqueron

Phyllanthus pitcairnensis is a species of flowering plant in the family Phyllanthaceae, first described by F. Brown as Glochidion taitense var. pitcairnense. It a tree which occurs only on Henderson Island and Pitcairn Island in the southern Pacific Ocean, with respective populations of approximately 20,000 and 500. It is known locally as usqueron and is classified as endangered on the IUCN Red List. Its estimated populations are approximately 500 individuals on Pitcairn Island and 20,000 on Henderson Island.

== Characteristic ==
The species was first described by F. Brown as Glochidion taitense var. pitcairnense, raised to species rank in Glochidion by Harold St. John, and transferred to Phyllanthus by W. L. Wagner and Lorence when Glochidion was merged into that genus. Some databases, including World Flora Online, still list it under Glochidion. A botanical survey of the Pitcairn group described it as a small tree, hairless in all parts, with drooping twigs, slightly bullate leaves, very small yellowish-green flowers and green capsules containing vermilion seeds, and noted it as rare in open fern communities.

Henderson Island, one of its two islands, has been a UNESCO World Heritage Site since 1988, and Pitcairn lies within the Tuamotu tropical moist forests ecoregion. The species was listed as vulnerable in an earlier IUCN assessment and as Endangered in 2023. A 2025 desktop study of invasive species on Pitcairn describes its populations as fragmented and declining and cites the spread of the invasive rose apple (Syzygium jambos) as a threat.
