= Phyllanthus bourdillonii =

Conservation status
- Vulnerable (IUCN 2.3)

Scientific classification
- Kingdom: Plantae
- Clade: Embryophytes
- Clade: Tracheophytes
- Clade: Spermatophytes
- Clade: Angiosperms
- Clade: Eudicots
- Clade: Rosids
- Order: Malpighiales
- Family: Phyllanthaceae
- Genus: Phyllanthus
- Species: P. bourdillonii

Binomial name
- Phyllanthus bourdillonii (Gamble) Chakrab. & N.P.Balakr.

Subspecies
- Phyllanthus bourdillonii var. bhutanicus (D.G.Long) Chakrab. & N.P.Balakr.; Phyllanthus bourdillonii var. bourdillonii

Synonyms
- Glochidion bourdillonii Gamble

Species of flowering plant

Phyllanthus bourdillonii is a species of flowering plant in the family Phyllanthaceae. It is a tree native to Bhutan and to Kerala in southern India.

== Varieties ==
Two varieties are accepted:

- Phyllanthus bourdillonii var. bhutanicus (D.G.Long) Chakrab. & N.P.Balakr. (synonyms Glochidion bhutanicum D.G.Long, G. bourdillonii var. bhutanicum (D.G.Long) Chakrab. & M.Gangop., and G. bourdillonii subsp. bhutanicum (D.G.Long) Chakrab. & N.P.Balakr.) – Bhutan
- Phyllanthus bourdillonii var. bourdillonii – Kerala

== Range and habitat ==
In Kerala it grows in the southern Western Ghats, at forest margins at low and medium elevations. In Bhutan it grows between Samdrupjongkhar and Riserboo in southern Bhutan, in cool-climate broadleaf forest at 2,150 metres elevation.
