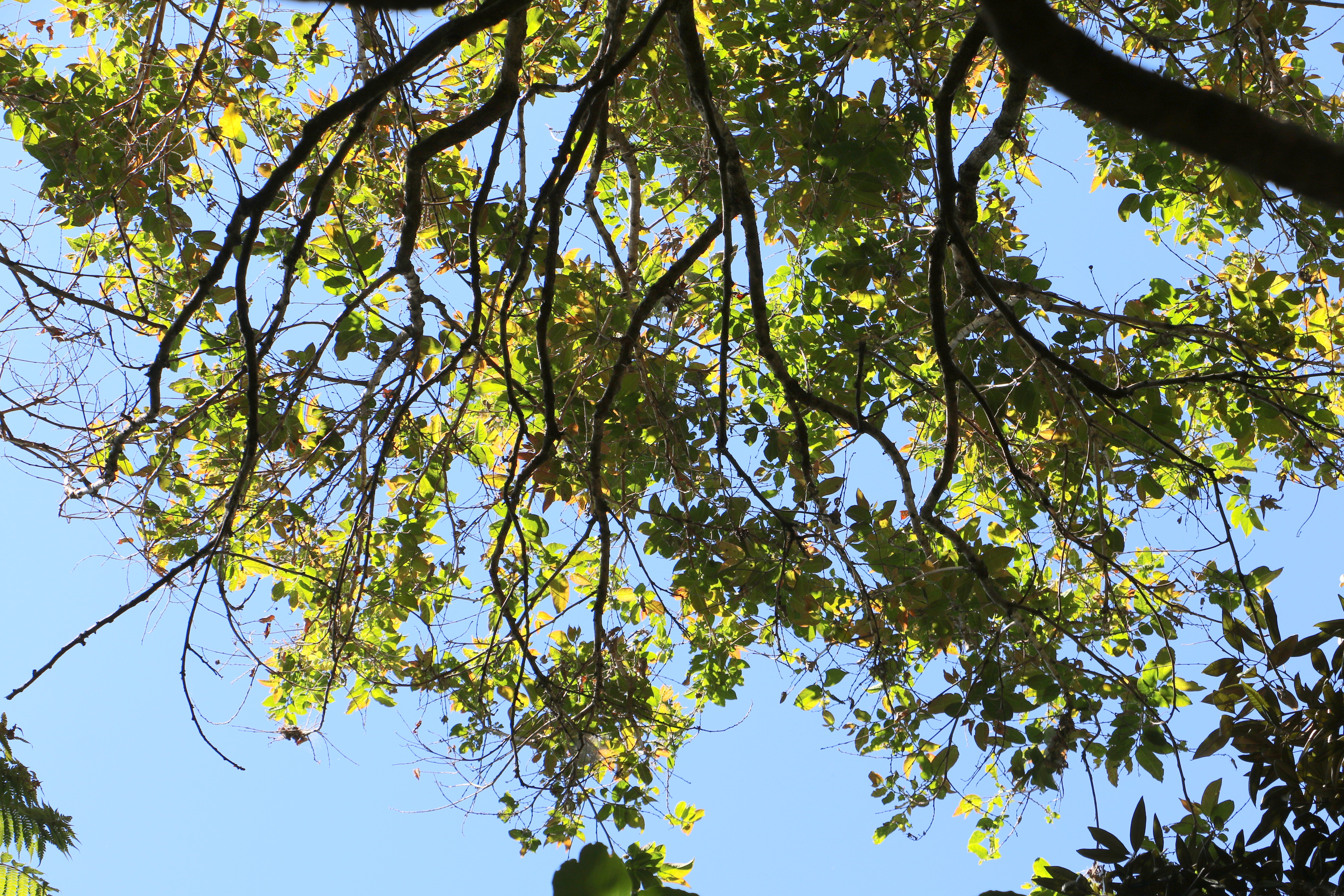

Conservation status
- Least Concern (IUCN 3.1)

Scientific classification
- Kingdom: Plantae
- Clade: Tracheophytes
- Clade: Angiosperms
- Clade: Eudicots
- Clade: Rosids
- Order: Malpighiales
- Family: Phyllanthaceae
- Genus: Glochidion
- Species: G. hylandii

Binomial name
- Glochidion hylandii Airy Shaw

= Glochidion hylandii =

Species of flowering plant

Glochidion hylandii known as the buttonwood, Hyland's buttonwood or pin flower tree is a plant in the family Phyllanthaceae. It is found in tropical north eastern Australia in the vicinity of the Atherton Tableland. Usually a small tree found in disturbed rainforest areas. The fruit capsule resembles a miniature Queensland Blue pumpkin (Cucurbita pepo). The buttonwood is named in honour of the botanist Bernard Hyland.
