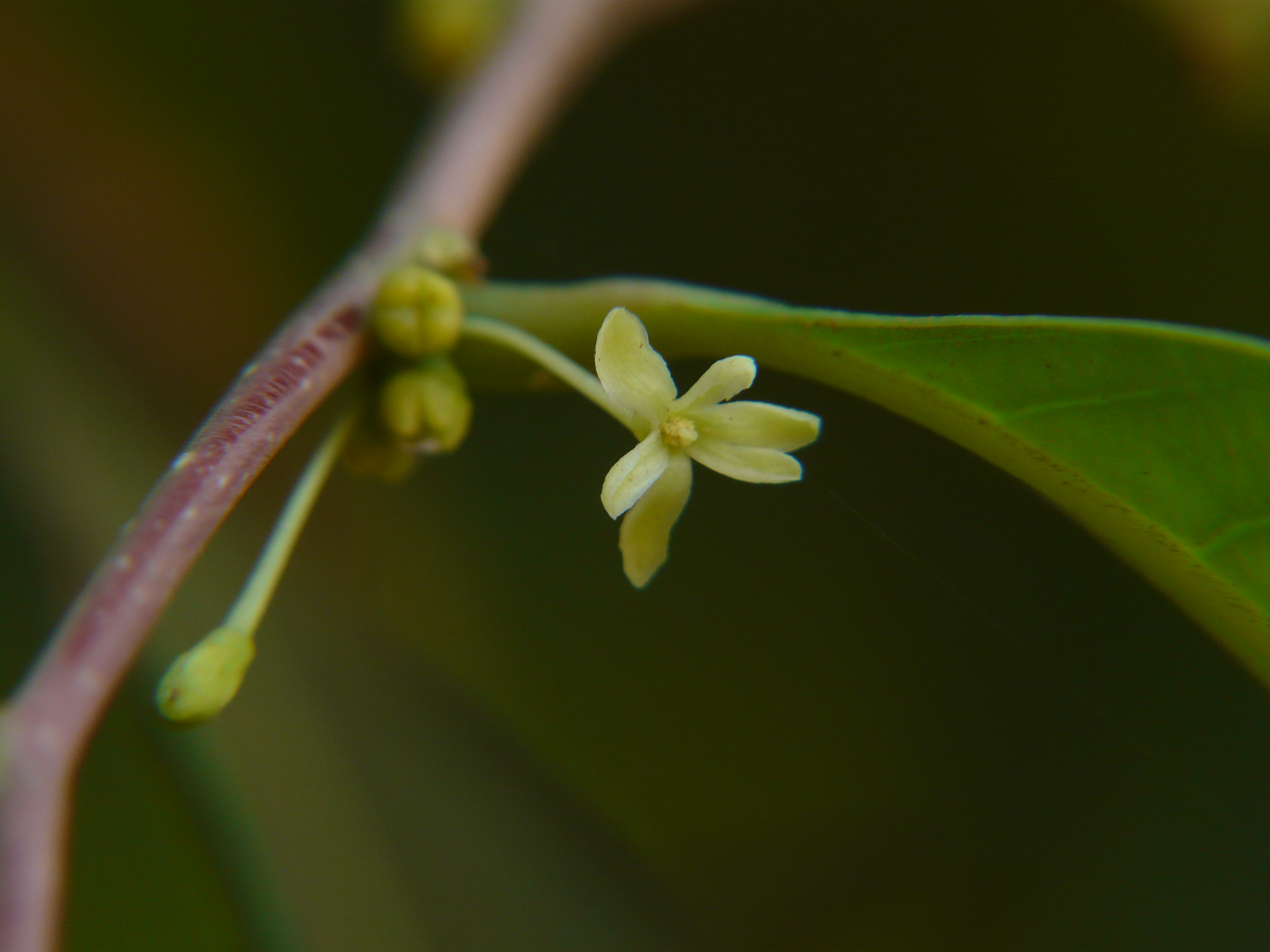

Conservation status
- Endangered (IUCN 2.3)

Scientific classification
- Kingdom: Plantae
- Clade: Tracheophytes
- Clade: Angiosperms
- Clade: Eudicots
- Clade: Rosids
- Order: Malpighiales
- Family: Phyllanthaceae
- Genus: Phyllanthus
- Species: P. candolleanus

Binomial name
- Phyllanthus candolleanus (Wight & Arn.) Chakrab. & N.P.Balakr. (2009)

Synonyms
- Synonymy: Diasperus arboreus (Wight) Kuntze (1891); Diasperus neilgerrhensis (Wight) Kuntze (1891); Diasperus perrottetianus (Müll.Arg.) Kuntze (1891); Diasperus pycnocarpus (Müll.Arg.) Kuntze (1891); Glochidion arboreum Wight (1852); Glochidion arboreum var. pauciflorum Hook.f. ex Gamble (1922), pro syn.; Glochidion candolleanum (Wight & Arn.) Chakrab. & M.Gangop. (1995); Glochidion neilgherrense Wight (1852); Glochidion pachycarpum Alston (1928); Glochidion pauciflorum Gamble (1922); Glochidion perrottetianum Bedd. (1873); Glochidion pycnocarpum (Müll.Arg.) Bedd. (1873); Glochidion pycnocarpum var. ellipticum Hook.f. (1887); Glochidion sisparense Gamble (1925); Lobocarpus candolleanus Wight & Arn. (1834) (basionym); Phyllanthus arboreus (Wight) Müll.Arg. (1865); Phyllanthus neilgherrensis (Wight) Müll.Arg. (1865); Phyllanthus pachycarpus (Alston) Chakrab. & N.P.Balakr. (2009); Phyllanthus perrottetianus Müll.Arg. (1865); Phyllanthus pycnocarpus Müll.Arg. (1865)

= Phyllanthus candolleanus =

Species of flowering plant

Phyllanthus candolleanus is a species of flowering plant in the family Phyllanthaceae. It is a tree native to Sri Lanka and southern India (Karnataka and Tamil Nadu).

The species was first described as Lobocarpus candolleanus in 1834. In 2007 it was moved to genus Phyllanthus as P. candolleanus. It is known by various synonyms, including Glochidion pauciflorum and Glochidion sisparense.
