= Glochidion symingtonii =

Conservation status
- Vulnerable (IUCN 2.3)

Scientific classification
- Kingdom: Plantae
- Clade: Tracheophytes
- Clade: Angiosperms
- Clade: Eudicots
- Clade: Rosids
- Order: Malpighiales
- Family: Phyllanthaceae
- Genus: Glochidion
- Species: G. symingtonii

Binomial name
- Glochidion symingtonii Airy Shaw

Species of tree

Glochidion symingtonii is a species of plant in the family Phyllanthaceae. It is a tree endemic to Peninsular Malaysia.
