= Phyllanthus moonii =

Scientific classification
- Kingdom: Plantae
- Clade: Tracheophytes
- Clade: Angiosperms
- Clade: Eudicots
- Clade: Rosids
- Order: Malpighiales
- Family: Phyllanthaceae
- Genus: Phyllanthus
- Species: P. moonii

Binomial name
- Phyllanthus moonii (Thwaites) Müll.Arg.

Synonyms
- Synonymy: Diasperus glaucogynus (Müll.Arg.) Kuntze; Diasperus moonii (Thwaites) Kuntze; Diasperus symplocoides (Müll.Arg.) Kuntze; Glochidion glaucogynum (Müll.Arg.) Bedd.; Glochidion montanum Thwaites; Glochidion moonii Thwaites; Glochidion moonii var. glaucogynum (Müll.Arg.) Trimen; Glochidion moonii f. glaucogynum (Müll.Arg.) Alston; Glochidion nemorale var. moonii (Thwaites) Chakrab. & N.P.Balakr.; Glochidion symplocoides (Müll.Arg.) Bedd.; Gynoon hirsutum Wight; Phyllanthus glaucogynus Müll.Arg.; Phyllanthus pubescens Moon; Phyllanthus srilankanus Chakrab. & N.P.Balakr.; Phyllanthus symplocoides Müll.Arg.

Species of flowering plant

Phyllanthus moonii is a species of plant in the family Phyllanthaceae. It is a shrub or tree endemic to Sri Lanka. The plant is known as බූ හුනුකිරිල්ල (bu hunukirilla) in Sinhala.

The species was first described as Glochidion moonii by George Henry Kendrick Thwaites in 1861. In 1866 Johannes Müller Argoviensis placed the species in genus Phyllanthus as P. moonii.

== Description ==
Phyllanthus moonii has hairy leaves that are lanceolate-oval in shape with acute ends (acuminate), and conspicuously reticulate veins. Branchlets are more or less tomentose. The numerous flowers are pale yellow; male flowers are found on long hairy peduncles while female flowers are sessile. Flowers may be solitary or grouped in axillary fascicles. Fruits are pubescent, strongly 3-lobed capsules, each topped by a persistent style.

== Ecology ==
Phyllanthus moonii is found in the rain forest understory of low montane and wet zones.
