= Phyllanthus nadeaudii =

Conservation status
- Vulnerable (IUCN 3.1)

Scientific classification
- Kingdom: Plantae
- Clade: Embryophytes
- Clade: Tracheophytes
- Clade: Spermatophytes
- Clade: Angiosperms
- Clade: Eudicots
- Clade: Rosids
- Order: Malpighiales
- Family: Phyllanthaceae
- Genus: Phyllanthus
- Species: P. nadeaudii

Binomial name
- Phyllanthus nadeaudii (J.Florence) W.L.Wagner & Lorence (2011)

Synonyms
- Glochidion nadeaudii J.Florence (1996)

Species of tree

Phyllanthus nadeaudii is a species of tree in the family Phyllanthaceae. It is endemic to the island of Mo'orea in French Polynesia, where it is found on several mountains above 420 meters elevation.
