= Phyllanthus st-johnii =

Conservation status
- Near Threatened (IUCN 3.1)

Scientific classification
- Kingdom: Plantae
- Clade: Embryophytes
- Clade: Tracheophytes
- Clade: Angiosperms
- Clade: Eudicots
- Clade: Rosids
- Order: Malpighiales
- Family: Phyllanthaceae
- Genus: Phyllanthus
- Species: P. st-johnii

Binomial name
- Phyllanthus st-johnii W.L.Wagner & Lorence (2011)

Synonyms
- Glochidion longipedicellatum J.W.Moore (1963), nom. illeg.; Glochidion longipes P.T.Li (1982); Glochidion myrtifolium J.W.Moore (1963)

Species of shrub

Phyllanthus st-johnii is a species of tree or shrub in the family Phyllanthaceae. It is endemic to the Society Islands of French Polynesia, where it is native to the islands of Bora Bora, Tahaa, Raiatea, and Moorea.
