= Phyllanthus comitus =

Conservation status
- Critically Endangered (IUCN 3.1)

Scientific classification
- Kingdom: Plantae
- Clade: Embryophytes
- Clade: Tracheophytes
- Clade: Spermatophytes
- Clade: Angiosperms
- Clade: Eudicots
- Clade: Rosids
- Order: Malpighiales
- Family: Phyllanthaceae
- Genus: Phyllanthus
- Species: P. comitus

Binomial name
- Phyllanthus comitus (J.Florence) W.L.Wagner & Lorence

Synonyms
- Glochidion comitum J.Florence

Species of plant

Phyllanthus comitus is a species of plant in the family Phyllanthaceae. It is a shrub or tree endemic to Pitcairn Island. It is threatened by habitat loss.

The species was first described as Glochidion comitum by Jacques Florence in 1997. In 2011 Warren Lambert Wagner and David H. Lorence placed the species in genus Phyllanthus as P. comitus.
