= Phyllanthus nemoralis =

Scientific classification
- Kingdom: Plantae
- Clade: Embryophytes
- Clade: Tracheophytes
- Clade: Angiosperms
- Clade: Eudicots
- Clade: Rosids
- Order: Malpighiales
- Family: Phyllanthaceae
- Genus: Phyllanthus
- Species: P. nemoralis

Binomial name
- Phyllanthus nemoralis (Thwaites) Müll.Arg. (1865)

Synonyms
- Synonymy: Diasperus gardneri (Thwaites) Kuntze (1891); Diasperus nemoralis (Thwaites) Kuntze (1891); Glochidion acutifolium Alston (1928); Glochidion gardneri Thwaites (1861); Glochidion gardneri var. acuminatum Trimen (1898); Glochidion leptogynum (Müll.Arg.) Bedd. (1873); Glochidion montanum var. glaberrimum Alston (1928); Glochidion montanum f. subglabrum (Trimen) Alston (1928); Glochidion moonii var. subglabrum Trimen (1898); Glochidion nemorale Thwaites (1861); Phyllanthus leptogynus Müll.Arg. (1865); Phyllanthus moonii var. subglaber (Trimen) Chakrab. & N.P.Balakr. (2009)

Species of flowering plant

Phyllanthus nemoralis is a species of flowering plant in the family Phyllanthaceae. It is a shrub or tree endemic to Sri Lanka.
