= Phyllanthus apodogynus =

Conservation status
- Least Concern (TPWCA)

Scientific classification
- Kingdom: Plantae
- Clade: Tracheophytes
- Clade: Angiosperms
- Clade: Eudicots
- Clade: Rosids
- Order: Malpighiales
- Family: Phyllanthaceae
- Genus: Phyllanthus
- Species: P. apodogynus

Binomial name
- Phyllanthus apodogynus (Airy Shaw) Govaerts

Synonyms
- Glochidion apodygnum Airy Shaw

Species of flowering plant

Phyllanthus apodogynus is a species of plant in the family Phyllanthaceae. It was first described in 1972 as Glochidion apodygnum by Airy Shaw, but in 2018 was transferred to the genus, Phyllanthus, by Rafael Govaerts.

It is native to northern Australia (found in Western Australia, the Northern Territory, and Queensland) and to New Guinea, growing in the wet tropical biome (in open forest, vine thickets and on the boundary between open forest and monsoon forest).

It is a tree growing up to about 10 m. tall, with yellow flowers and whitish fruits with red seeds. The undersides of the leaves are pubescent.
