= Phyllanthus raiateaensis =

Conservation status
- Endangered (IUCN 3.1)

Scientific classification
- Kingdom: Plantae
- Clade: Embryophytes
- Clade: Tracheophytes
- Clade: Spermatophytes
- Clade: Angiosperms
- Clade: Eudicots
- Clade: Rosids
- Order: Malpighiales
- Family: Phyllanthaceae
- Genus: Phyllanthus
- Species: P. raiateaensis

Binomial name
- Phyllanthus raiateaensis W.L.Wagner & Lorence

Synonyms
- Glochidion moorei P.T.Li; Glochidion salicifolium J.W.Moore (1963), nom. illeg. homonym. post.

Species of flowering plant

Phyllanthus raiateaensis is a species of tree in the family Phyllanthaceae. It is endemic to the Te Mehani Plateau on the island of Raiatea in the Society Islands of French Polynesia.
