= Phyllanthus rapaensis =

Conservation status
- Vulnerable (IUCN 3.1)

Scientific classification
- Kingdom: Plantae
- Clade: Embryophytes
- Clade: Tracheophytes
- Clade: Spermatophytes
- Clade: Angiosperms
- Clade: Eudicots
- Clade: Rosids
- Order: Malpighiales
- Family: Phyllanthaceae
- Genus: Phyllanthus
- Species: P. rapaensis

Binomial name
- Phyllanthus rapaensis (J.Florence) W.L.Wagner & Lorence

Synonyms
- Glochidion rapaense J.Florence

Species of flowering plant

Phyllanthus rapaensis, also known by its synonym Glochidion rapaense, is a species of tree in the family Phyllanthaceae. It is endemic to the island of Rapa in the Austral Islands of French Polynesia. Molecular phylogenetic analysis indicates that it is extremely closely related to Phyllanthus longfieldiae, which is also endemic to Rapa.
