= Nambiyath Puthansurayil Balakrishnan =

Indian botanist

Nambiyath Puthansurayil Balakrishnan (1935 – 2024) was an Indian botanist. He served with the Botanical Survey of India (BSI), where he was a plant collector, researcher, administrator, and author and editor of numerous articles and books on Indian flora.

Balakrishnan received an MA in botany from the University of Madras in 1958. In 1967 he received an MSc in plant taxonomy from the University of Liverpool in England. He received a PhD in 1972 from Gauhati University, India for his work on the Flora of Jowai, published in 1981.

He joined the Botanical Survey of India in 1958 and served until his retirement in 1993. He worked in the BSI offices at Allahabad, Coimbatore, Howrah, Port Blair, and Shillong. During his 11 years at Port Blair in the Andaman Islands he oversaw the creation of India's first air-conditioned herbarium and helped establish the Andaman-Nicobar Circle of the Botanical Survey of India. At the time of his retirement he was Joint Director of the BSI, based at the Madras Herbarium in Coimbatore. After retirement he served as an Emeritus Scientist at the BSI.

Balakrishnan was an authority on the Eriocaulaceae and Euphorbiaceae plant families in India. He published nearly 200 scientific articles and authored six books. He has contributed to floras of Tamil Nadu (1989) and Madhya Pradesh (1992), and was an editor of volumes 1, 2 and 23 of the Flora of India. His associates and co-authors include Francis Raymond Fosberg and Tapas Chakrabarty. He continued his research as an emeritus scientist, particularly on the taxonomy of Indian Euphorbiaceae.

Balakrishnan is responsible for collecting about 12,000 herbarium specimens, with significant collections from central and peninsular India, Assam, Meghalaya, Bhutan, and the Andaman and Nicobar Islands. He published 346 botanical names.

In 2003 he served as President of Indian Association for Angiosperm Taxonomy. In 2006 Balakrishnan was awarded the EK Janaki Ammal National Award in Plant Taxonomy by the Indian government's Ministry of Environment and Forests.
