= Phyllanthus grantii =

Conservation status
- Endangered (IUCN 3.1)

Scientific classification
- Kingdom: Plantae
- Clade: Embryophytes
- Clade: Tracheophytes
- Clade: Spermatophytes
- Clade: Angiosperms
- Clade: Eudicots
- Clade: Rosids
- Order: Malpighiales
- Family: Phyllanthaceae
- Genus: Phyllanthus
- Species: P. grantii

Binomial name
- Phyllanthus grantii (J.Florence) W.L.Wagner & Lorence

Synonyms
- Glochidion grantii J.Florence

Species of flowering plant

Phyllanthus grantii, also known by the synonym Glochidion grantii, is a species of tree or shrub in the family Phyllanthaceae. It is endemic to the islands of Tahaʻa and Raiatea in the Society Islands of French Polynesia, where it is restricted to montane plateaus and ridge forests at elevations of 435–730 meters.

The species was first described as Glochidion grantii by Jacques Florence in 1996. In 2011 Warren Lambert Wagner and David H. Lorence placed the species in genus Phyllanthus as P. grantii.
