= Phyllanthus temehaniensis =

Conservation status
- Near Threatened (IUCN 3.1)

Scientific classification
- Kingdom: Plantae
- Clade: Embryophytes
- Clade: Tracheophytes
- Clade: Angiosperms
- Clade: Eudicots
- Clade: Rosids
- Order: Malpighiales
- Family: Phyllanthaceae
- Genus: Phyllanthus
- Species: P. temehaniensis

Binomial name
- Phyllanthus temehaniensis (J.W.Moore) W.L.Wagner & Lorence (2011)

Synonyms
- Glochidion temehaniense J.W.Moore (1963)

Species of flowering plant

Phyllanthus temehaniensis, also known by the synonym Glochidion temehaniense, is a species of flowering plant in the family Phyllanthaceae. It is a shrub or tree endemic to the Society Islands of French Polynesia, where it is native to the islands of Tahaa, Raiatea, and Huahine. Like all other species of Phyllanthus, it is pollinated by leafflower moths in the genus Epicephala.
