= Phyllanthus taitensis =

Conservation status
- Least Concern (IUCN 3.1)

Scientific classification
- Kingdom: Plantae
- Clade: Tracheophytes
- Clade: Angiosperms
- Clade: Eudicots
- Clade: Rosids
- Order: Malpighiales
- Family: Phyllanthaceae
- Genus: Phyllanthus
- Species: P. taitensis

Binomial name
- Phyllanthus taitensis (Baillon ex Müll.Arg.) Müll.Arg. (1865)

Synonyms
- Diasperus taitensis (Baill. ex Müll.Arg.) Kuntze (1891); Glochidion majus Baill. (1858), nom. nud.; Glochidion ramiflorum var. macrophyllum Müll.Arg. (1863); Glochidion taitense Baill. ex Müll.Arg. (1863); Phyllanthus ramiflorus var. macrophyllus (Müll.Arg.) Müll.Arg. (1865); Phyllanthus taitensis var. glabrescens Müll.Arg. (1866)

Species of flowering plant

Phyllanthus taitensis, also known by the synonym Glochidion taitense or as mahame in Tahitian, is a species of tree or shrub in the family Phyllanthaceae. It is endemic to the Windward Society Islands of French Polynesia. It is common on the island of Tahiti, where it grows in a wide variety of habitats, but has only been collected once on the nearby island of Moorea, only 17 kilometers distant. It is easily distinguishable from other species of Phyllanthus on Tahiti and Moorea due to the pubescence on its leaves, young branches, and flowers.

== Taxonomy ==
Phyllanthus taitensis was formally described in 1865 by Johannes Müller Argoviensis, who attributed his description to an earlier, invalid one published by Louis Antoine François Baillon. The type specimen was collected from the island of Tahiti in French Polynesia.

It has the common names mahame and mame in Tahiti.

== Description ==
Phyllanthus taitensis is a shrub that grows to heights of 1.5–7 m (4.9–23.0 ft) and has a stem diameter of 5–20 cm (2–8 in). The oval-shaped leaves measure 2.5 cm–16.3 cm × 1.8 cm–9.2 cm (1 in–6 in × 0.7 in–4 in). The top surface of the leaves is dark green, while the bottom surface is pale or greyish green. It is easily distinguishable from other species of Phyllanthus on Tahiti and Moorea due to the pubescence on its leaves, young branches, and flowers.

== Distribution and ecology ==
Phyllanthus taitensis is endemic to the southern Pacific Ocean, where it is only found on the islands of Tahiti and Moorea in French Polynesia. It is extremely widespread on the former island, to the point of being the most common species of its genus, but has only been found once on Moorea. It occupies a wide range of habitats, being found on valleys and slopes at elevations of 50–1,500 m (160–4,920 ft). It occurs alongside Neonauclea-Hibiscus in lower altitude valleys and with Metrosideros-Weinmannia and Alstonia-Streblus in montane forests.

The species has been documented flowering February to October, while fruiting has been documented from February to November.
