= Phyllanthus stellatus =

Scientific classification
- Kingdom: Plantae
- Clade: Embryophytes
- Clade: Tracheophytes
- Clade: Angiosperms
- Clade: Eudicots
- Clade: Rosids
- Order: Malpighiales
- Family: Phyllanthaceae
- Genus: Phyllanthus
- Species: P. stellatus

Binomial name
- Phyllanthus stellatus Retz.

Synonyms
- Diasperus jussieuianus (Wight) Kuntze; Diasperus stellatus (Retz.) Kuntze; Glochidion jussieuianum (Wight) Thwaites; Glochidion rigidum (A.Juss.) Müll.Arg.; Glochidion stellatum (Retz.) Bedd.; Glochidion thwaitesii Müll.Arg.; Gynoon jussieuianum Wight; Gynoon rigidum A.Juss.; Gynoon tetrandrum D.Dietr.; Gynoon triandrum Wight & Arn.; Phyllanthus jussieuianus (Wight) Müll.Arg.

Species of flowering plant

Phyllantus stellatus is a species of flowering plant in the family Phyllanthaceae. It is a shrub or tree endemic to Sri Lanka.

The species was first described by Anders Jahan Retzius in 1788.
