= Phyllanthus longfieldiae =

Conservation status
- Vulnerable (IUCN 3.1)

Scientific classification
- Kingdom: Plantae
- Clade: Embryophytes
- Clade: Tracheophytes
- Clade: Angiosperms
- Clade: Eudicots
- Clade: Rosids
- Order: Malpighiales
- Family: Phyllanthaceae
- Genus: Phyllanthus
- Species: P. longfieldiae

Binomial name
- Phyllanthus longfieldiae Ridl. (1926)

Synonyms
- Glochidion longfieldiae (Ridl.) F.Br. (1935)

Species of flowering plant

Phyllanthus longfieldiae, or kaema in the Rapa language, is a species of tree or shrub in the family Phyllanthaceae. It is endemic to the island of Rapa in the Austral Islands in French Polynesia. Molecular phylogenetic analysis indicates that it is extremely closely related to the tree Glochidion rapaense, which is also endemic to Rapa.
