= Phyllanthus manono =

Conservation status
- Least Concern (IUCN 3.1)

Scientific classification
- Kingdom: Plantae
- Clade: Embryophytes
- Clade: Tracheophytes
- Clade: Angiosperms
- Clade: Eudicots
- Clade: Rosids
- Order: Malpighiales
- Family: Phyllanthaceae
- Genus: Phyllanthus
- Species: P. manono

Binomial name
- Phyllanthus manono (Baill. ex Müll.Arg.) Müll.Arg. (1865)

Synonyms
- Diasperus manono (Baill. ex Müll.Arg.) Kuntze (1891); Glochidion manono Baill. ex Müll.Arg. (1863)

Species of tree

Phyllanthus manono, also known as manono or mahame in Tahitian, is a species of shrub or small tree in the family Phyllanthaceae. It is endemic to the Windward Society Islands in French Polynesia, where it is found on the islands of Tahiti and Moorea. Compared to other species of Phyllanthus in the Society Islands, G. manono is found in relatively low-elevation areas, including some disturbed environments.
