= Phyllanthus marchionicus =

Conservation status
- Least Concern (IUCN 3.1)

Scientific classification
- Kingdom: Plantae
- Clade: Embryophytes
- Clade: Tracheophytes
- Clade: Angiosperms
- Clade: Eudicots
- Clade: Rosids
- Order: Malpighiales
- Family: Phyllanthaceae
- Genus: Phyllanthus
- Species: P. marchionicus

Binomial name
- Phyllanthus marchionicus (F.Br.) W.L.Wagner & Lorence (2011)

Synonyms
- Glochidion marchionicum F.Br. (1935); Glochidion marquesanum (F.Br.) Croizat (1942); Glochidion ramiflorum var. marquesanum F.Br. (1935); Glochidion tooviianum J.Florence (1996)

Species of flowering plant

Phyllanthus marchionicus is a species of tree in the family Phyllanthaceae. It is endemic to the Marquesas Islands in French Polynesia, where it grows on the islands of Nuku Hiva, Ua Pou, Ua Huka, Hiva Oa, Tahuata, and Fatu Hiva, in a variety of habitats.

Glochidion tooviianum was described as a species endemic to the Toovii Plateau on Nuku Hiva by Jacques Florence in 1996. Plants of the World Online considers it a synonym of Phyllanthus marchionicus, as both species are indistinguishable except for the presence of pubescence on G. tooviianum and the absence of pubescence on P. marchionicus/G. marchionicum.
