= Phyllanthus papenooensis =

Conservation status
- Endangered (IUCN 3.1)

Scientific classification
- Kingdom: Plantae
- Clade: Embryophytes
- Clade: Tracheophytes
- Clade: Angiosperms
- Clade: Eudicots
- Clade: Rosids
- Order: Malpighiales
- Family: Phyllanthaceae
- Genus: Phyllanthus
- Species: P. papenooensis

Binomial name
- Phyllanthus papenooensis (J.Florence) W.L.Wagner & Lorence

Synonyms
- Glochidion papenooense J.Florence

Species of flowering plant

Phyllanthus papenooense, also known by its synonym Glochidion papenooense, is a species of tree in the family Phyllanthaceae. It is endemic to the island of Tahiti in the Society Islands of French Polynesia, where it is restricted to wetland habitats. Because of its rarity, it is protected by law in French Polynesia.

The species was first described as Glochidion papenooense by Jacques Florence in 1996. In 2011 Warren Lambert Wagner and David H. Lorence placed the species in genus Phyllanthus as P. papenooensis.
