= Phyllanthus distichus (disambiguation) =

The botanical name Phyllanthus distichus may refer to:

- Phyllanthus distichus Hook. & Arn., a species of flowering plant found in the Hawaiian Islands
- Phyllanthus distichus (L.) Müll.Arg., nom. illeg., a synonym of Phyllanthus acidus, native to Brazil
