= Phyllanthus eximius =

Conservation status
- Vulnerable (IUCN 2.3)

Scientific classification
- Kingdom: Plantae
- Clade: Tracheophytes
- Clade: Angiosperms
- Clade: Eudicots
- Clade: Rosids
- Order: Malpighiales
- Family: Phyllanthaceae
- Genus: Phyllanthus
- Species: P. eximius

Binomial name
- Phyllanthus eximius Webster & Proctor

Species of flowering plant

Phyllanthus eximius is a species of plant in the family Phyllanthaceae. It is endemic to Jamaica. It is threatened by habitat loss.
