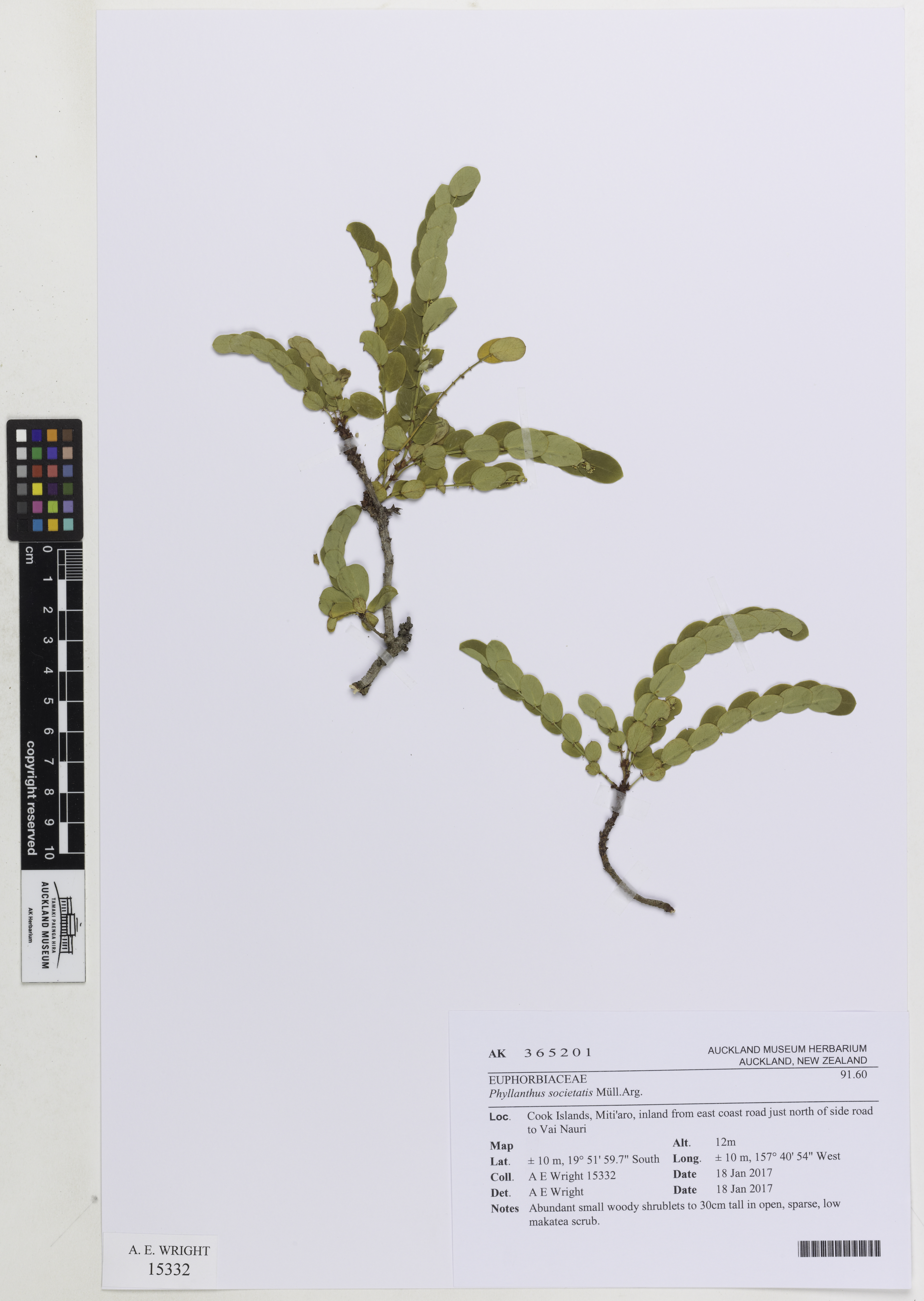
- Herbarium specimen from the Auckland War Memorial Museum

Scientific classification
- Kingdom: Plantae
- Clade: Tracheophytes
- Clade: Angiosperms
- Clade: Eudicots
- Clade: Rosids
- Order: Malpighiales
- Family: Phyllanthaceae
- Genus: Phyllanthus
- Species: P. societatis

Binomial name
- Phyllanthus societatis Müll.Arg.

= Phyllanthus societatis =

Species of flowering plant

Phyllanthus societatis is a species of flowering plant in the family Phyllanthaceae, native to Nauru, the Cook Islands and the Tuamotus in the southern Pacific Ocean. It exclusively inhabits lowland calcareous soils. It is known to grow in inland scrub, coastal vegetation, and in sunny patches inside Guettarda-Homalium and Hibiscus-Pandanus forests.

== Taxonomy ==
Phyllanthus societatis was formally described in 1866 by Johannes Müller Argoviensis on the basis of specimens collected by the U.S. Exploring Expedition. The type locality was given as "insula Societatis Maitia"; this has variously been interpreted as indicating either the Society Islands or the atoll of Makatea in the Tuamotus, both of which are in French Polynesia.

It has the Tuamotuan common name pitipiti'o oviri, meaning wild rosary pea (Abrus precatorius). On Mitiaro in the Cook Islands, it is called torepapa in Cook Islands Māori.

== Description ==
Phyllanthus societatis is a shrub that grows to heights of up to 120 cm (47 in) and has a stem diameter of 1 cm (0.4 in). The upright stem is covered with light green leaves.

== Distribution and ecology ==
Phyllanthus societatis is native to the south-central Pacific Ocean, where it is found on Nauru, the Cook Islands, and French Polynesia. On the Cook Islands, it is known from the islands of Aitutaki, Atiu, Mauke, and Mitiaro, while in French Polynesia, it is known only from Makatea. It exclusively inhabits lowland calcicolus (calcium-rich) soils and is frequently found growing in rocky soils. On the Cook Islands, it is found on the shore or in inland scrub growing on limestone substrate. On Makatea, it is found in sunny patches inside Guettarda-Homalium and Hibiscus-Pandanus forests growing on plateaus.

The species has been documented flowering and fruiting from January to September.
