= Phyllanthus caesiifolius =

Conservation status
- Critically Endangered (IUCN 3.1)

Scientific classification
- Kingdom: Plantae
- Clade: Tracheophytes
- Clade: Angiosperms
- Clade: Eudicots
- Clade: Rosids
- Order: Malpighiales
- Family: Phyllanthaceae
- Genus: Phyllanthus
- Species: P. caesiifolius

Binomial name
- Phyllanthus caesiifolius Petra Hoffm. & Cheek

Species of flowering plant

Phyllanthus caesiifolius is a species of plant in the family Phyllanthaceae. It is endemic to Cameroon. Its natural habitat is subtropical or tropical moist lowland forests. It is threatened by habitat loss.
