= Phyllanthus coluteoides =

Conservation status
- Endangered (IUCN 3.1)

Scientific classification
- Kingdom: Plantae
- Clade: Tracheophytes
- Clade: Angiosperms
- Clade: Eudicots
- Clade: Rosids
- Order: Malpighiales
- Family: Phyllanthaceae
- Genus: Phyllanthus
- Species: P. coluteoides

Binomial name
- Phyllanthus coluteoides Baill. ex Müll.Arg.

Synonyms
- Diasperus coluteoides (Baill. ex Müll.Arg.) Kuntze

Species of flowering plant

Phyllanthus coluteoides is a species of flowering plant in the family Phyllanthaceae, native to west Madagascar and the Mozambique Channel Islands (Juan de Nova Island).
