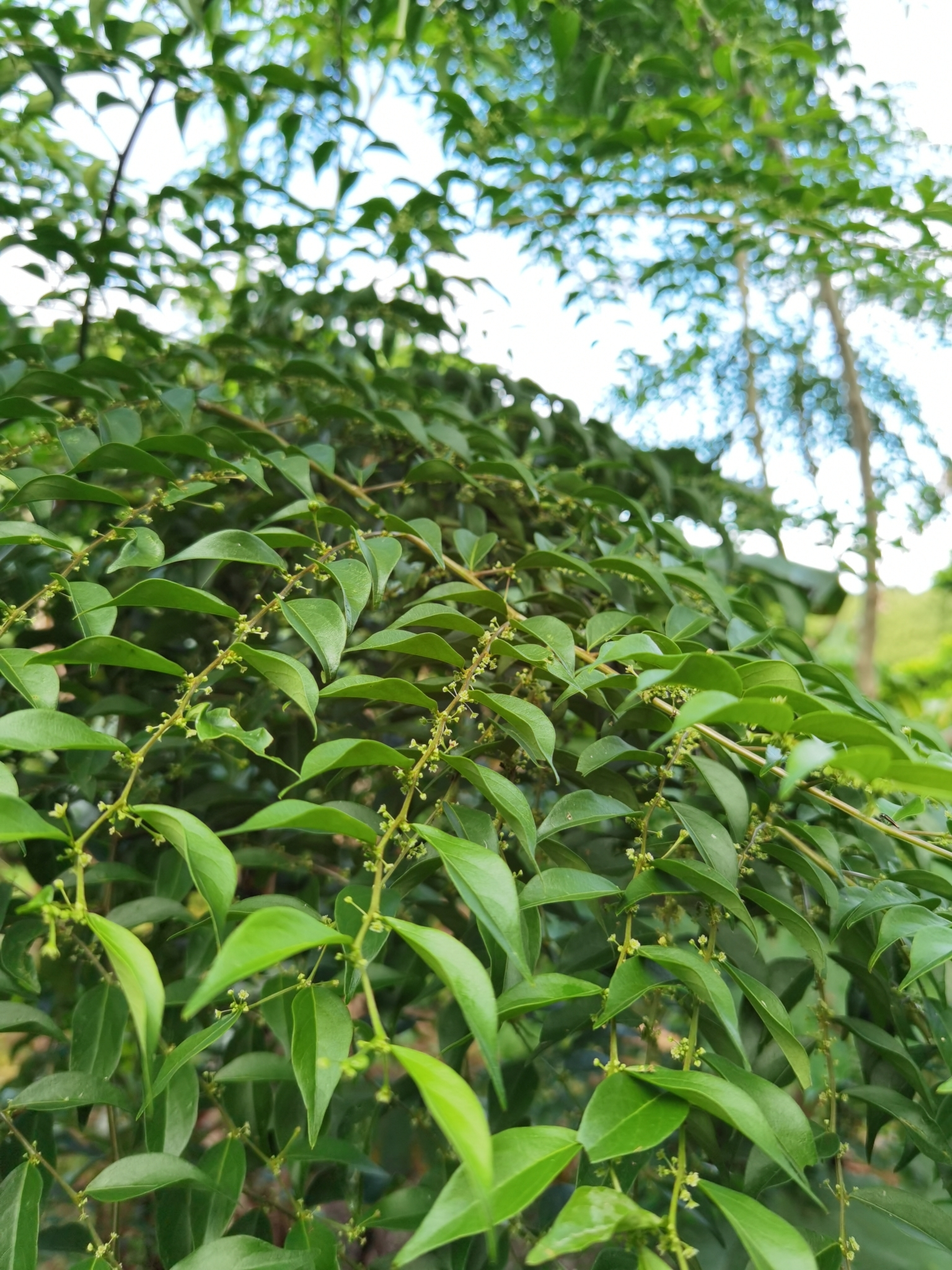
- Near Santo Domingo, Costa Rica

Conservation status
- Least Concern (IUCN 3.1)

Scientific classification
- Kingdom: Plantae
- Clade: Tracheophytes
- Clade: Angiosperms
- Clade: Eudicots
- Clade: Rosids
- Order: Malpighiales
- Family: Phyllanthaceae
- Genus: Phyllanthus
- Species: P. acuminatus

Binomial name
- Phyllanthus acuminatus Vahl

Synonyms
- Diasperus acuminatus (Vahl) Kuntze; Phyllanthus acuminatus var. paraguariensis Chodat & Hassl.; Phyllanthus averrhoifolius Steud.; Phyllanthus cumanensis Willd. ex Steud.; Phyllanthus foetidus Pav. ex Baill.; Phyllanthus lycioides Kunth; Phyllanthus mucronatus Kunth; Phyllanthus ruscoides Kunth; Phyllanthus sessei Briq.

= Phyllanthus acuminatus =

Species of tree

Phyllanthus acuminatus, also called the Jamaican gooseberry tree, is species of flowering plant in the family Phyllanthaceae. It is a shrub or tree in the Caribbean, Central America and South America.

== Uses ==
It is used as a medicine, as a poison, and for food. This plant is used by the Choco as a piscicide.
