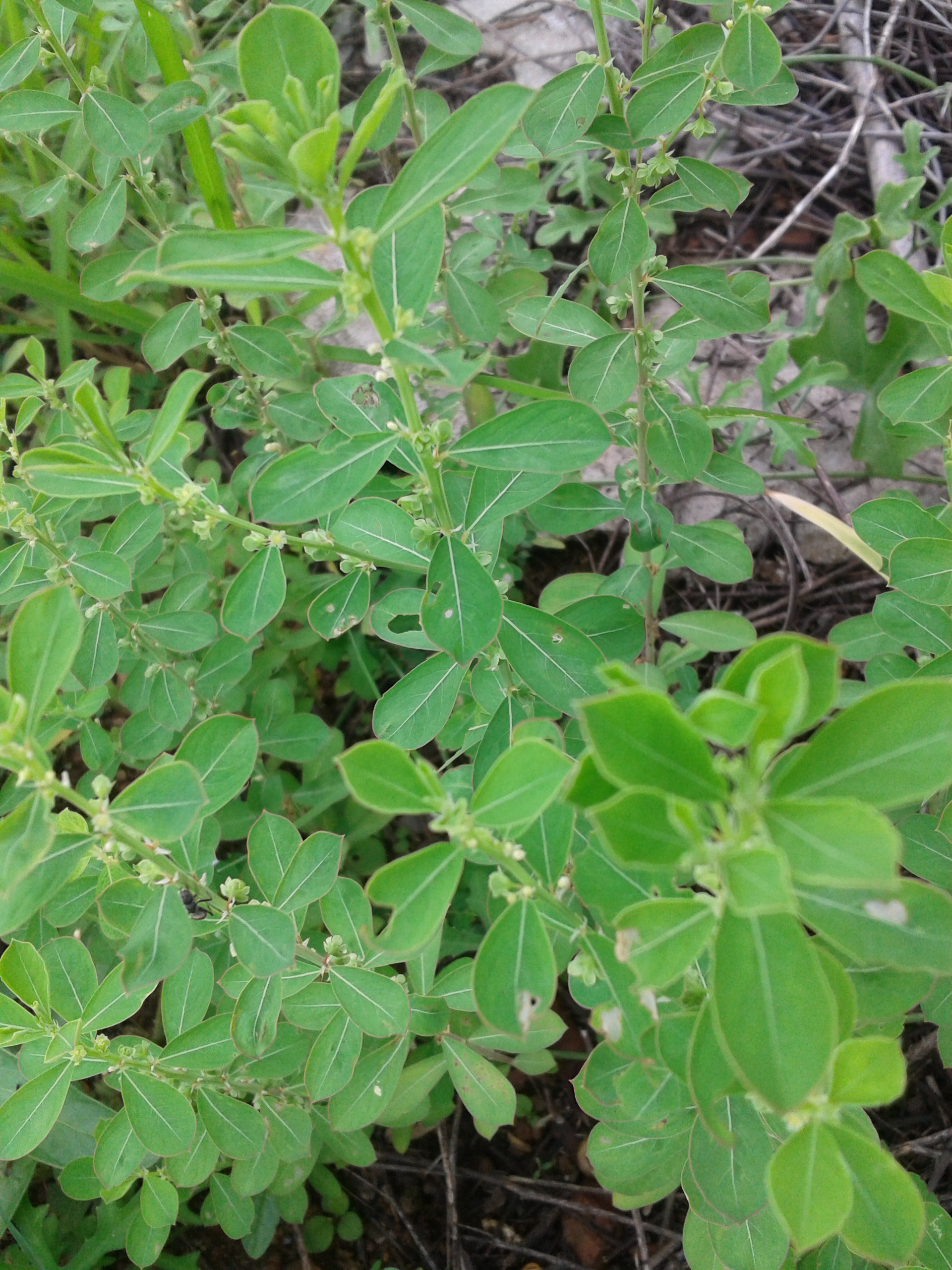

Conservation status
- Least Concern (IUCN 3.1)

Scientific classification
- Kingdom: Plantae
- Clade: Tracheophytes
- Clade: Angiosperms
- Clade: Eudicots
- Clade: Rosids
- Order: Malpighiales
- Family: Phyllanthaceae
- Genus: Phyllanthus
- Species: P. maderaspatensis

Binomial name
- Phyllanthus maderaspatensis L.

Varieties
- Phyllanthus maderaspatensis var. exasperata Radcl.-Sm.; Phyllanthus maderaspatensis var. frazieri Fosberg; Phyllanthus maderaspatensis var. maderaspatensis

Synonyms
- Diasperus gracilis (Roxb.) Kuntze; Diasperus gueinzii (Müll.Arg.) Kuntze; Diasperus maderaspatensis (L.) Kuntze; Nellica maderaspatana Raf. nom. illeg.; Phyllanthus andrachnoides Willd.; Phyllanthus arabicus Hochst. ex Steud.; Phyllanthus brachypodus F.Muell. ex Benth. nom. illeg.; Phyllanthus cuneatus Willd.; Phyllanthus gracilis Roxb.; Phyllanthus gueinzii Müll.Arg.; Phyllanthus javanicus Poir. ex Spreng.; Phyllanthus longifolius Sond. nom. illeg.; Phyllanthus magudensis Jean F.Brunel; Phyllanthus obcordatus Willd.; Phyllanthus stipulaceus Bojer; Phyllanthus thonningii Schumach. & Thonn.; Phyllanthus vaccinioides Klotzsch nom. illeg.; Phyllanthus venosus Hochst. ex A.Rich.

= Phyllanthus maderaspatensis =

Species of flowering plant

Phyllanthus maderaspatensis is a perennial herbaceous species of plant in the family Phyllanthaceae, widespread in tropical and subtropical areas of the Old World, including tropical Africa, Madagascar and the western Indian Ocean Islands, the Arabian Peninsula, the Indian subcontinent, Indochina, southeastern China, Java, New Guinea, and northern and eastern Australia.

== Varieties ==
Three varieties are accepted.

- Phyllanthus maderaspatensis var. exasperata Radcl.-Sm. – Kenya
- Phyllanthus maderaspatensis var. frazieri Fosberg – Aldabra
- Phyllanthus maderaspatensis var. maderaspatensis – tropical Africa, Madagascar and the western Indian Ocean Islands, the Arabian Peninsula, the Indian subcontinent, Indochina, southeastern China, Java, New Guinea, and northern and eastern Australia

== Uses ==
=== India ===
The plant is widely used in Indian medicine for treatment of headaches. Indian herbal medicine for liver troubles called Bhumyamlaki might use the plant.

=== Africa ===
==== Tanzania ====
The pounded form of the whole plant is applied to scabies.

==== Niger ====
The plant is used as an aphrodisiac.

==== Kenya ====
The smoke from the burning plants is used to exterminate caterpillars in maize.
