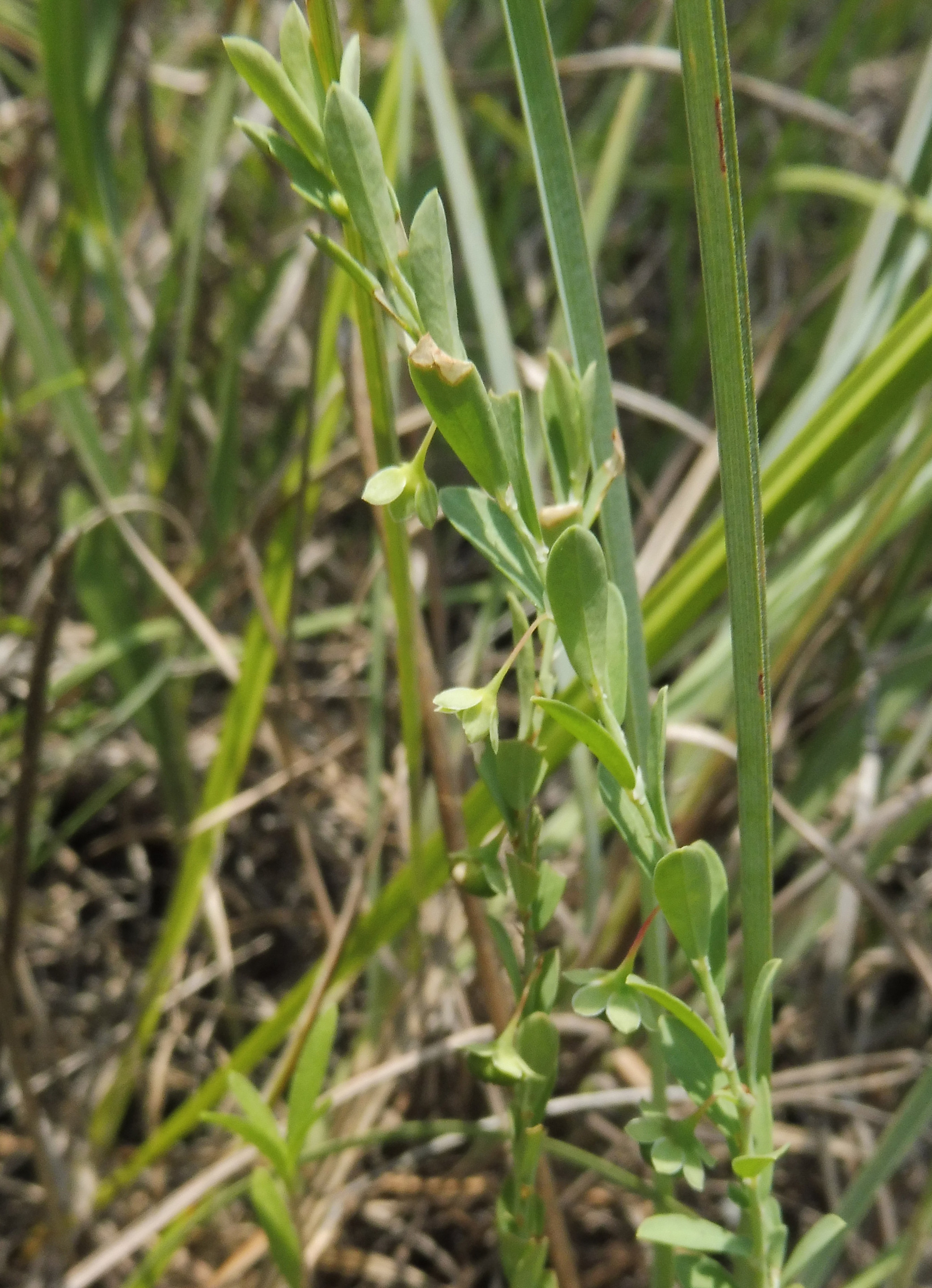

Scientific classification
- Kingdom: Plantae
- Clade: Tracheophytes
- Clade: Angiosperms
- Clade: Eudicots
- Clade: Rosids
- Order: Malpighiales
- Family: Phyllanthaceae
- Genus: Phyllanthus
- Species: P. polygonoides

Binomial name
- Phyllanthus polygonoides Nuttall ex Sprengel

= Phyllanthus polygonoides =

Smartweed leaf-flower

Species of flowering plant

Phyllanthus polygonoides, known as smartweed leaf-flower or knotweed leafflower, is an herbaceous perennial plant in the family Phyllanthaceae. It grows from 10 to 50 centimeters in height. It is native to the United States (Arizona, New Mexico, Texas, Oklahoma, Arkansas, Missouri, and Louisiana) and northern and central Mexico.

Smartweed leaf-flower grows in a variety of habitats throughout its range, including grasslands, shrublands (including the Chihuahuan Desert), and glades in forests. It is often associated with limestone and calcareous soils.

It is morphologically similar to the closely related species, pinewoods dainties (Phyllanthus liebmannianus). In the United States these species are allopatrically distributed, but there is a zone of overlap in the ranges of the two species in central Mexico.
