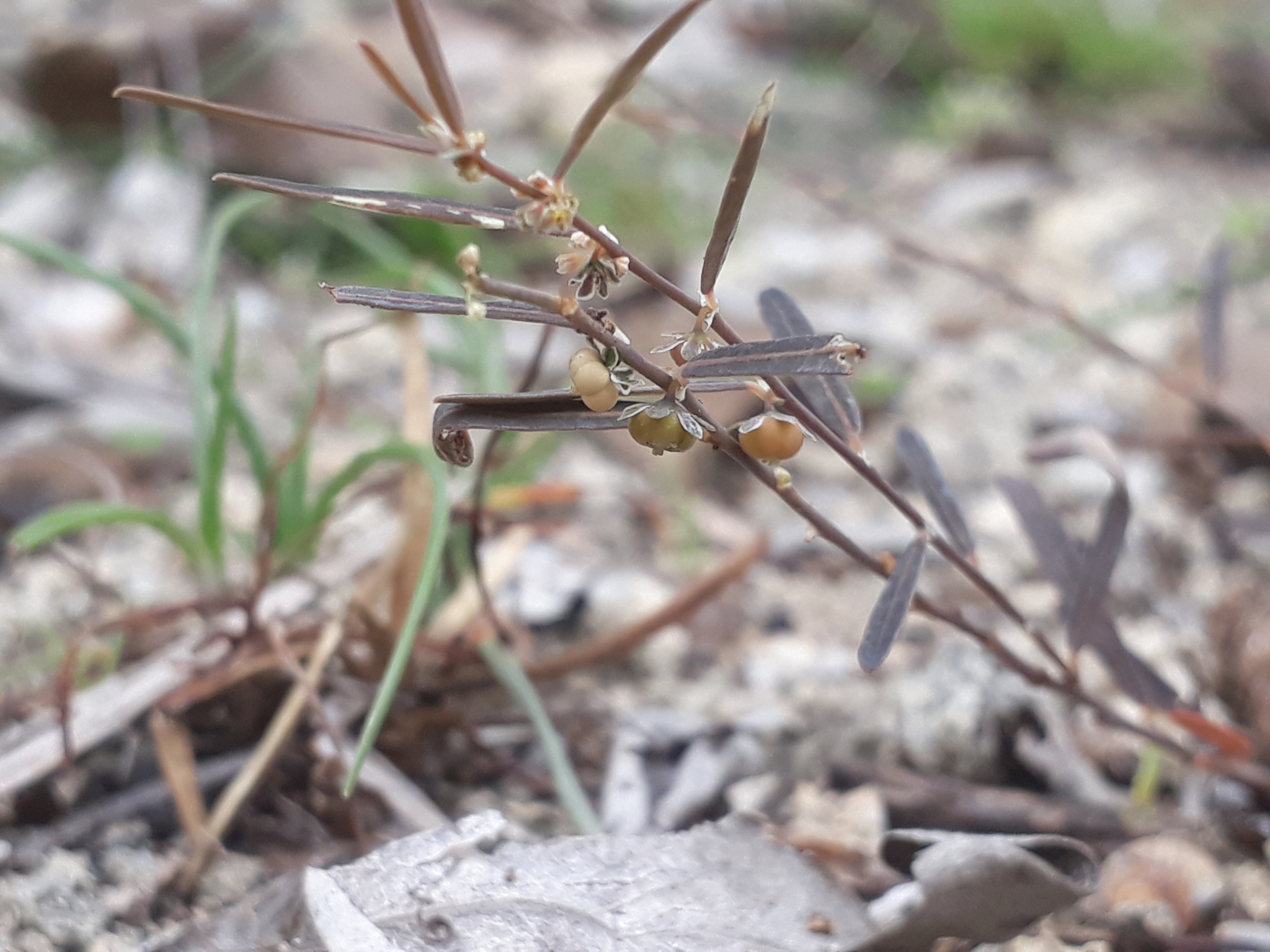

Conservation status
- Critically Endangered (IUCN 2.3)

Scientific classification
- Kingdom: Plantae
- Clade: Tracheophytes
- Clade: Angiosperms
- Clade: Eudicots
- Clade: Rosids
- Order: Malpighiales
- Family: Phyllanthaceae
- Genus: Phyllanthus
- Species: P. revaughanii

Binomial name
- Phyllanthus revaughanii Coode

= Phyllanthus revaughanii =

Species of flowering plant

Phyllanthus revaughanii is a species of flowering plant in the family Phyllanthaceae, native to the Mascarene Islands and the Mozambique Channel Islands (Europa Island, Juan de Nova Island). Its natural habitat is rocky shores.
