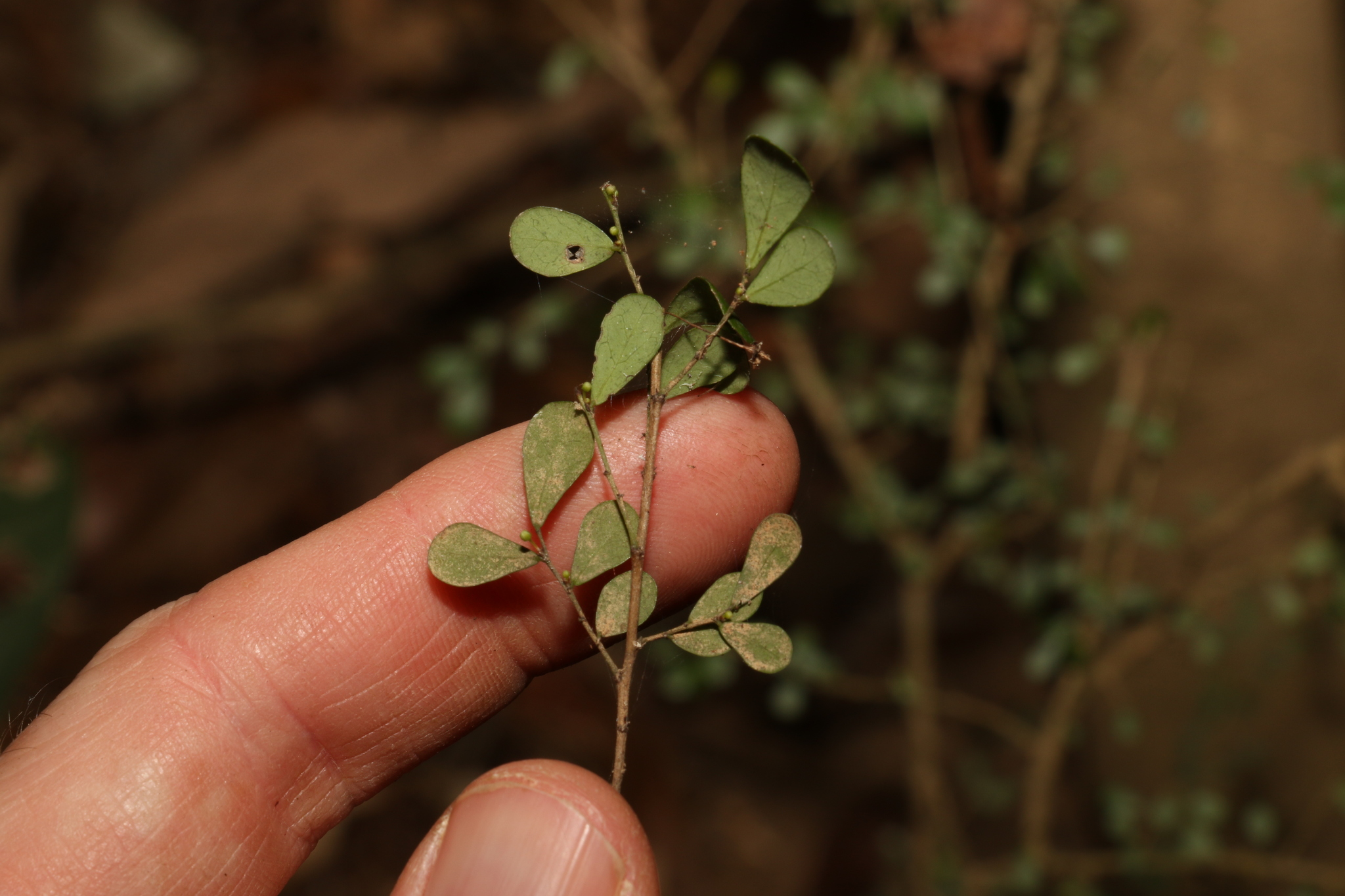
- Brush sauropus

Conservation status
- Least Concern (NCA)

Scientific classification
- Kingdom: Plantae
- Clade: Embryophytes
- Clade: Tracheophytes
- Clade: Angiosperms
- Clade: Eudicots
- Clade: Rosids
- Order: Malpighiales
- Family: Phyllanthaceae
- Genus: Phyllanthus
- Species: P. microcladus

Binomial name
- Phyllanthus microcladus Muell.Arg.

Synonyms
- Diasperus microcladus (Müll.Arg.) Kuntze; Sauropus albiflorus subsp. microcladus (Müll.Arg.); Phyllanthus microcladus var. microphyllus Müll.Arg.; Phyllanthus microcladus var. puberulus Müll.Arg.; Phyllanthus pusillifolius S.Moore

= Phyllanthus microcladus =

Species of plant

Phyllanthus microcladus, commonly known as the brush sauropus or small-leaved Phyllanthus, is a plant in the family Phyllanthaceae found in tropical and sub tropical areas of eastern Queensland and northeastern New South Wales in Australia. It is listed as endangered in New South Wales, but in Queensland it is assessed as least concern. It occurs by streams in rainforest, from near Grafton northwards to around Cairns.

== Description ==
The brush sauropus is a small evergreen shrub which reaches a height of 35 cm (14 in) in the southern parts of its range, but may grow to 2 m (6 ft 7 in) in the north. The leaves are simple and opposite, and clustered on short branchlets. They usually measure between 2 and 9 mm (0.08 and 0.35 in) long and are somewhat egg-shaped with the narrower end attached to the twig on a petiole about 1 mm (0.04 in) long.

The inflorescences are produced in the leaf axils, and may consist of a single flower or a small cluster. The flowers are either male or female and in most cases both sexes occur on the one plant. They are about 4 mm (0.16 in) diameter, the male flowers held on a fine stem up to 10 mm (0.39 in) long and the female ones on a stem up to 20 mm (0.79 in) long. The fruit is a smooth round capsule about 3 mm (0.12 in) diameter.

== Taxonomy ==
This species was first described in 1865 by the Swiss botanist Johann Müller, who published his works under the name Johannes Müller Argoviensis to distinguish himself from other botanists of the time with similar names. He described two varieties – Phyllanthus microcladus var. microphyllus which was based on material collected from the Clarence River in New South Wales, and Phyllanthus microcladus var. puberulus based on material collected at Moreton Bay in Queensland. Both varieties are now considered to be synonyms of the parent.

Müller's paper was published in the German-language journal Linnaea: ein Journal für die Botanik in ihrem ganzen Umfange, oder Beiträge zur Pflanzenkunde.

== Distribution and habitat ==
Phyllanthus microcladus is found in scattered populations from near Mossman in northeast Queensland to the Northern Rivers region of New South Wales. The preferred habitat is alongside creeks and rivers in tropical and subtropical rainforest.

In New South Wales much of the former habitat areas have been cleared for agriculture and housing. Populations are small and fragmented, and they are threatened by invasive weeds and by being crushed by domestic animals such as cattle. Stream erosion also threatens their habitat.

== Conservation ==
This species is listed by the Queensland Government's Department of Environment, Science and Innovation as least concern. As of 9 February 2024, it has not been assessed by the International Union for Conservation of Nature (IUCN).

== Gallery ==
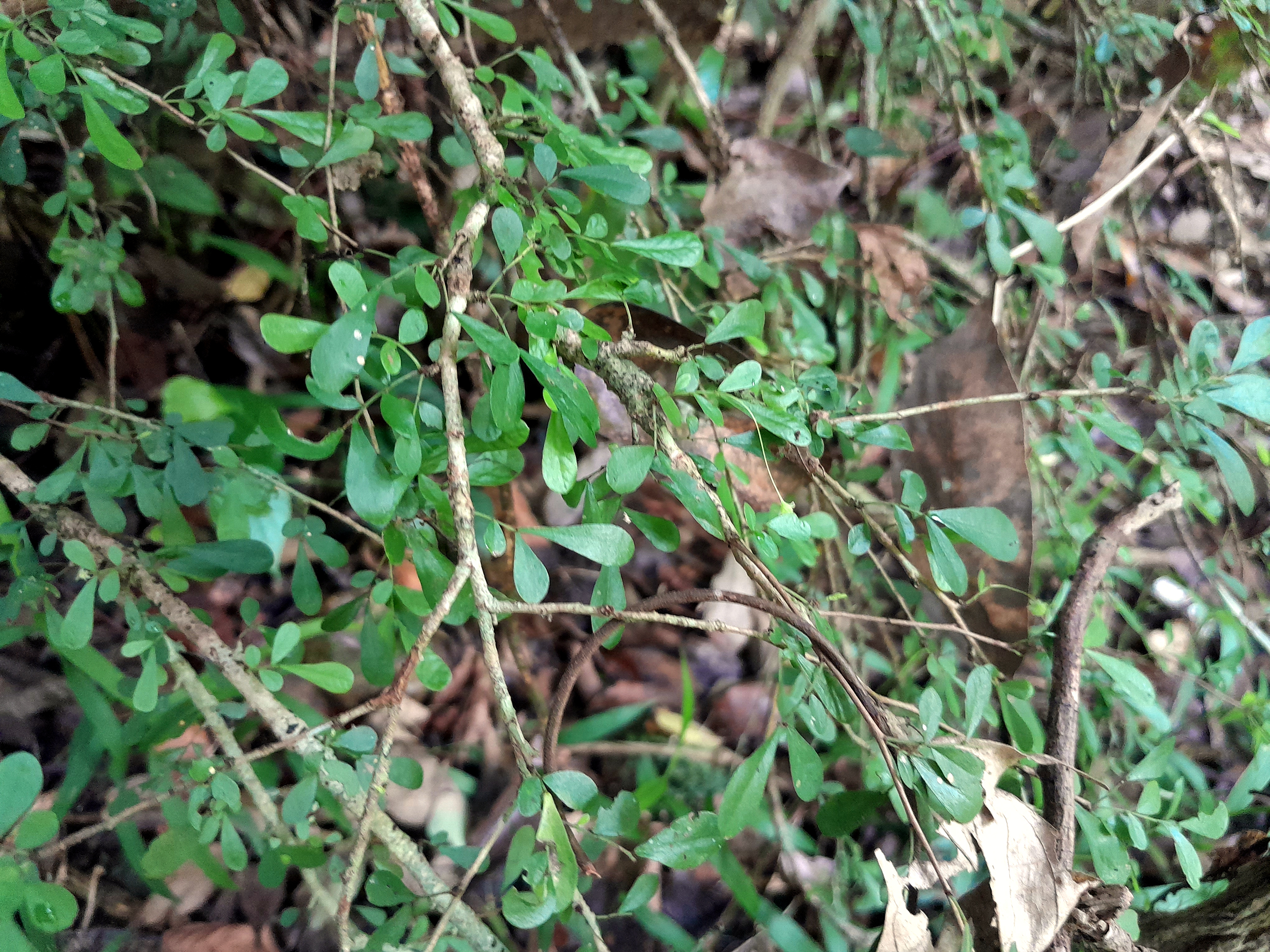
Habit

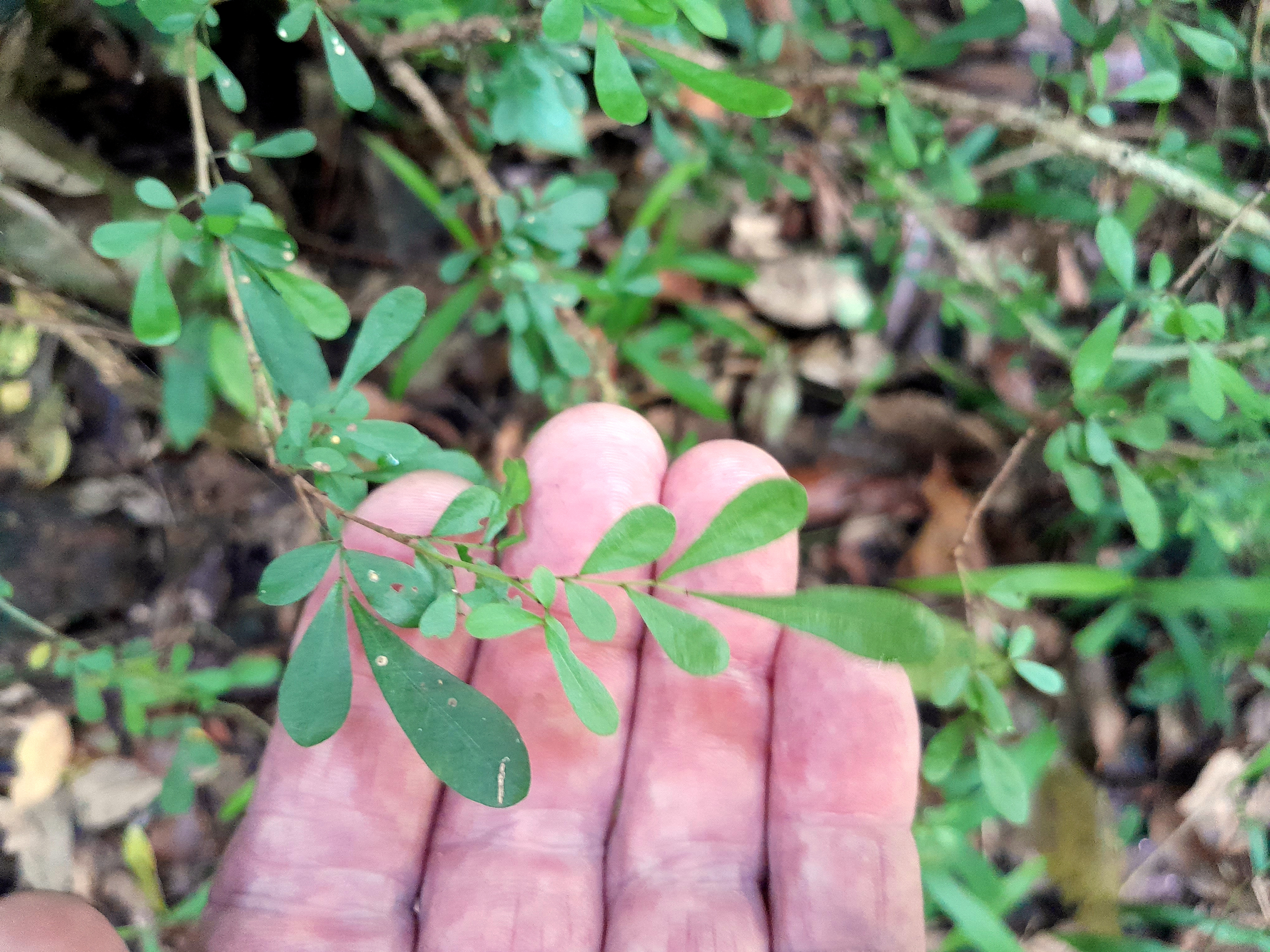
Foliage

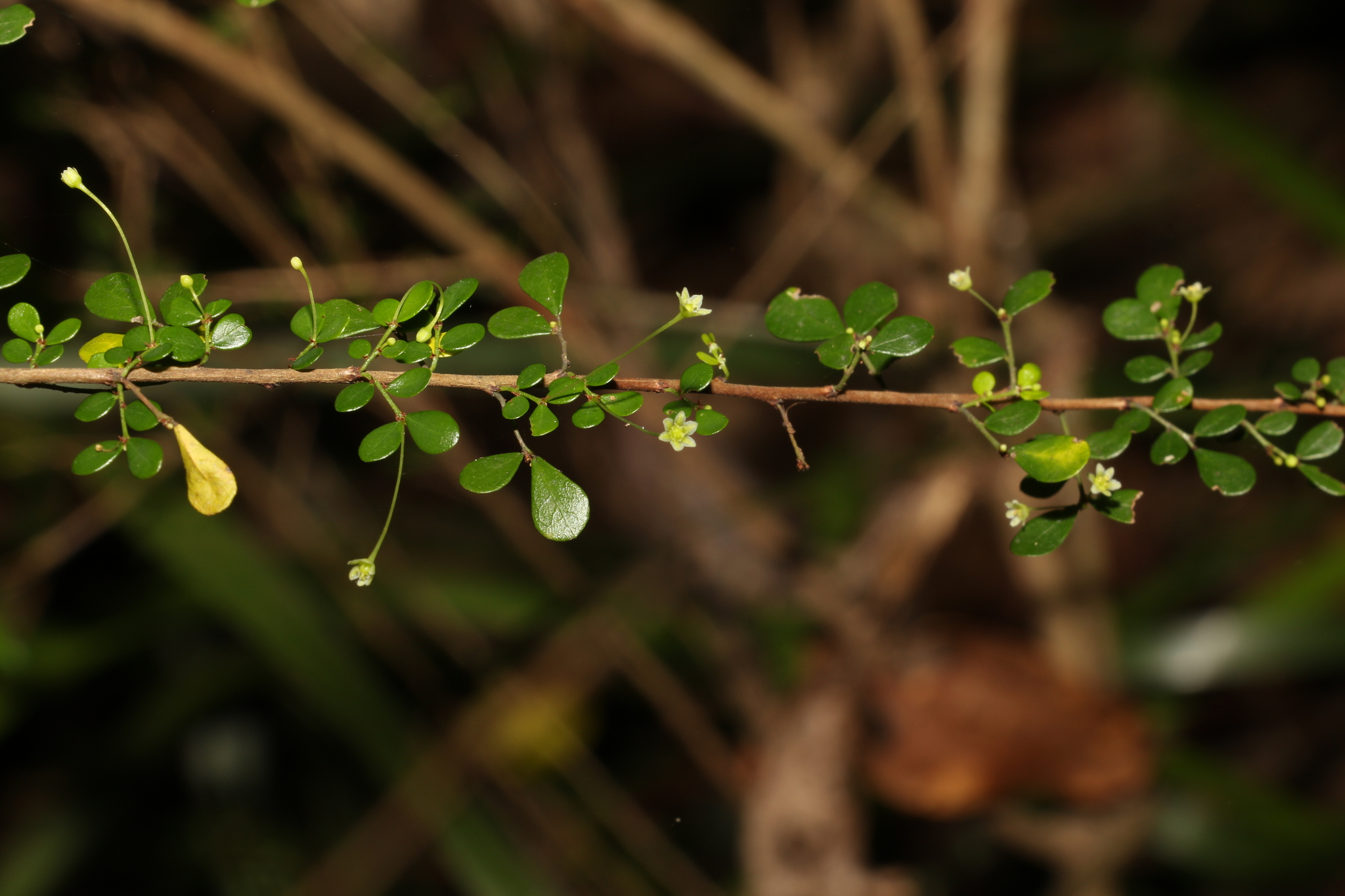
Foliage and flowers

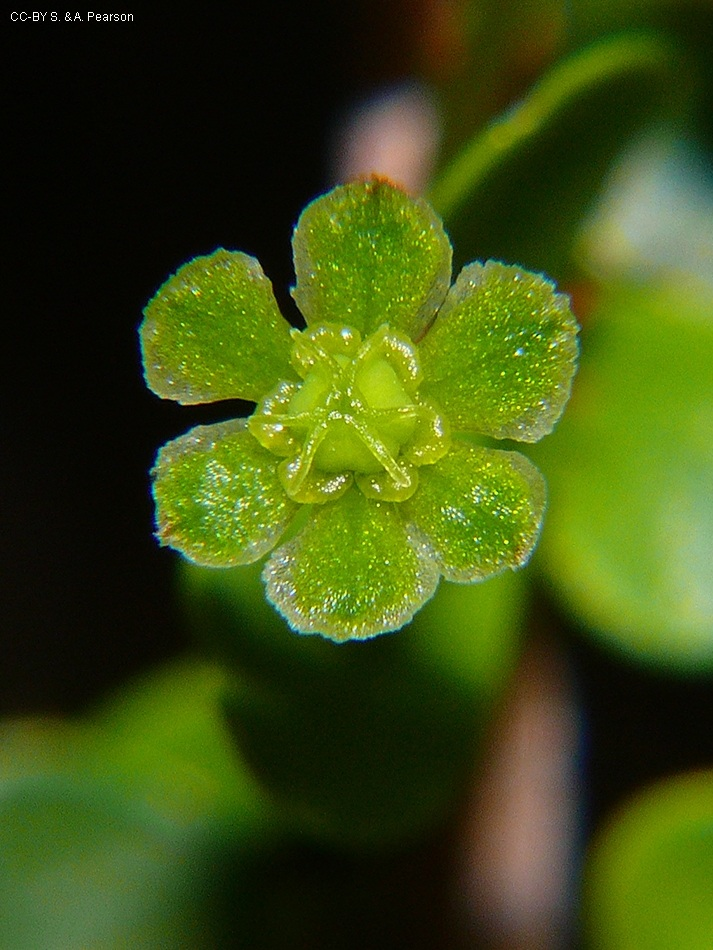
Female flower

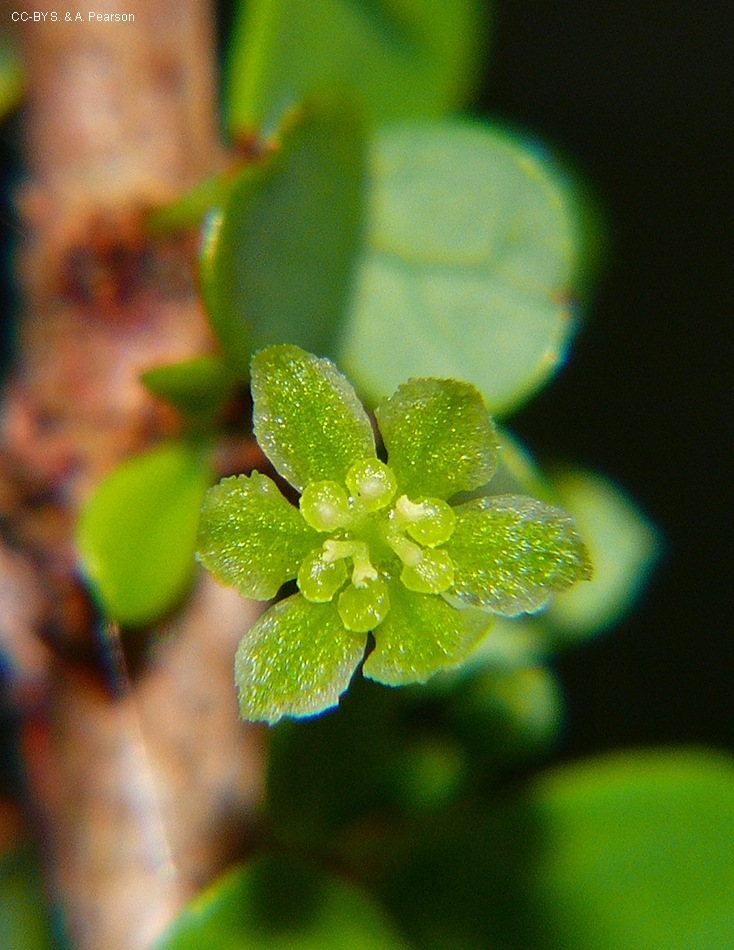
Male flower

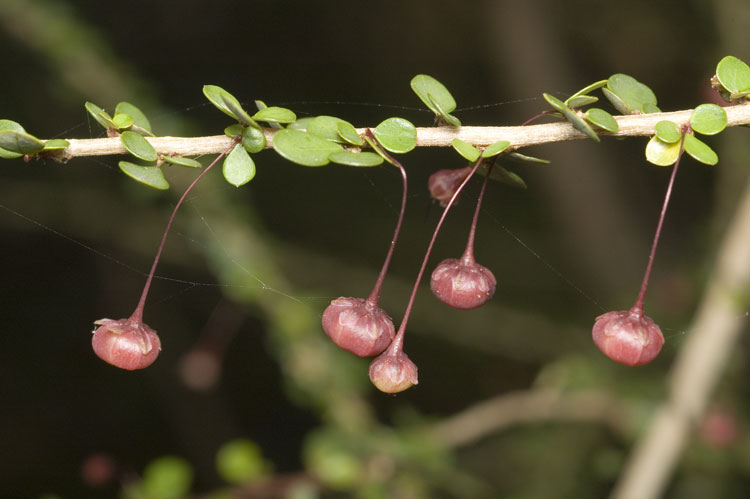
Fruit
