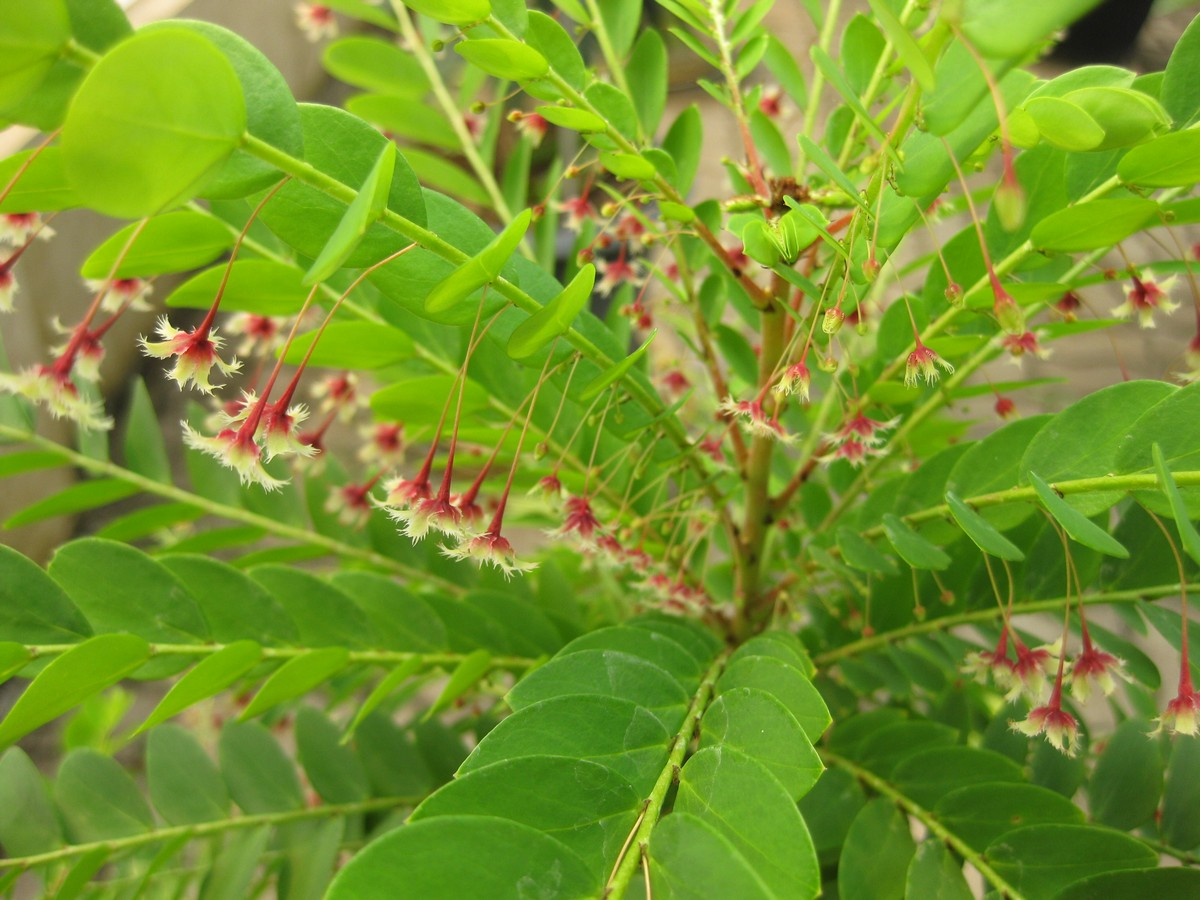
- Phyllanthus pulcher leaves and flowers

Scientific classification
- Kingdom: Plantae
- Clade: Tracheophytes
- Clade: Angiosperms
- Clade: Eudicots
- Clade: Rosids
- Order: Malpighiales
- Family: Phyllanthaceae
- Genus: Phyllanthus
- Species: P. pulcher

Binomial name
- Phyllanthus pulcher Wall. ex Müll.Arg.

= Phyllanthus pulcher =

Species of flowering plant

Phyllanthus pulcher, the tropical leaf-flower, is a species in the genus Phyllanthus. Phyllanthus pulcher is known commonly as a weed. Its leaves fold closed at night (an example of Nyctinasty).
