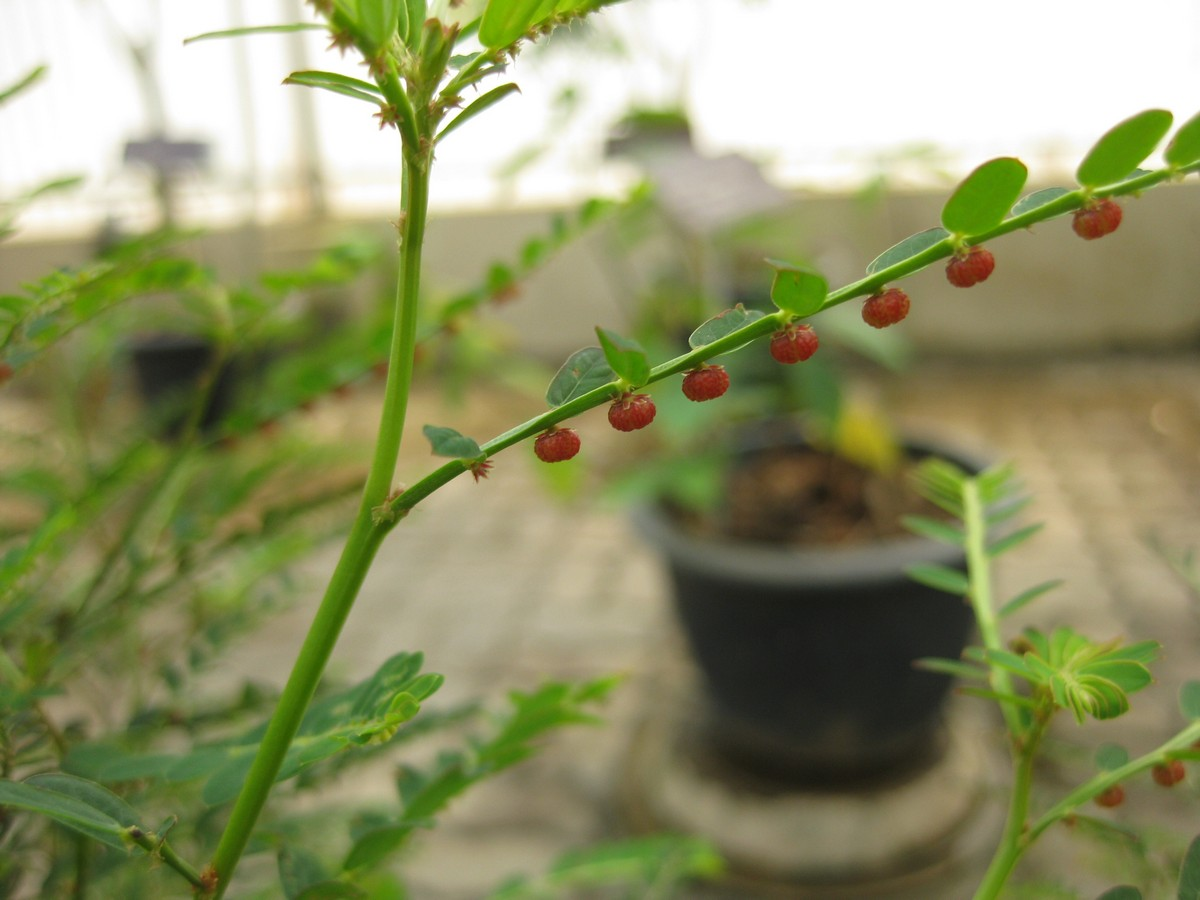

Scientific classification
- Kingdom: Plantae
- Clade: Embryophytes
- Clade: Tracheophytes
- Clade: Angiosperms
- Clade: Eudicots
- Clade: Rosids
- Order: Malpighiales
- Family: Phyllanthaceae
- Genus: Phyllanthus
- Species: P. urinaria

Binomial name
- Phyllanthus urinaria L.

Subspecies
- Phyllanthus urinaria subsp. nudicarpus Rossignol & Haicour; Phyllanthus urinaria subsp. urinaria

Synonyms
- Homotypic: Emblica urinaria (L.) R.W. Bouman; Diasperus urinaria (L.) Kuntze; Heterotypic: Diasperus hookeri (Müll.Arg.) Kuntze; Phyllanthus alatus Blume; Phyllanthus cantoniensis Hornem.; Phyllanthus croizatii Steyerm.; Phyllanthus echinatus Buch.-Ham. ex Benth., nom. nud.; Phyllanthus hookeri Müll.Arg.; Phyllanthus lauterbachianus Pax; Phyllanthus lepidocarpus Siebold & Zucc.; Phyllanthus leprocarpus Wight; Phyllanthus mauritianus Henry H.Johnst.; Phyllanthus muricatus Benth., nom. nud.; Phyllanthus nozeranii Rossignol & Haicour; Phyllanthus rubens Bojer ex Baker; Phyllanthus urinaria var. hookeri (Müll.Arg.) Hook.f.; Phyllanthus urinaria var. laevis Haines; Phyllanthus urinaria var. oblongifolius Müll.Arg.; Phyllanthus verrucosus Elmer, nom. illeg.

= Phyllanthus urinaria =

Species of plant

Phyllanthus urinaria is a species of annual flowering plant in the family Phyllanthaceae. It is native to Asia and has an introduced presence in tropical and subtropical areas worldwide. It has common names such as chamber bitter, gripeweed, shatterstone, stonebreaker, and leafflower.

== Description ==
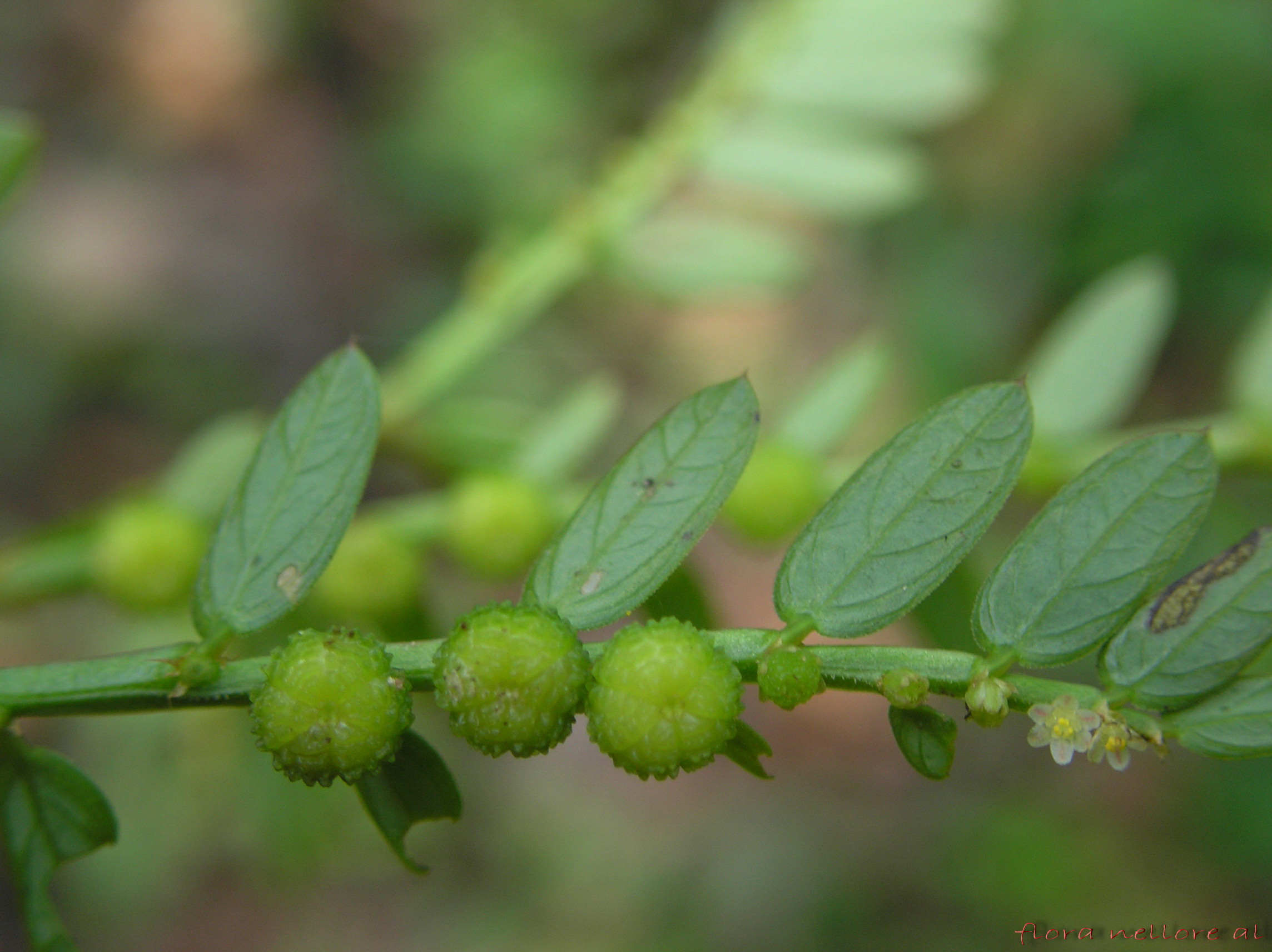
Fruits and flowers of Phyllanthus urinaria

Phyllanthus urinaria is a summer annual and germinates from early summer to early fall, requiring warm soil and light. It grows to a height of about 60 centimetres (2 feet), has small alternate leaves resembling those of the genus Mimosa, disposed in two ranges. It is suffruticose, woody at the base and herbaceous above. The leaves are large at the tip and smaller towards the petiole. The leaves are closed at night and are open in the day. Flowers are greenish white, minute and appear in the leaf axils, hanging on short pedicels below the leaves. Numerous small green-red fruits, round and smooth, are found along the underside of the stems, which are erect and red. It reproduces by seeds, which are found in the green, wart-like fruit attached to the underside of the branch.

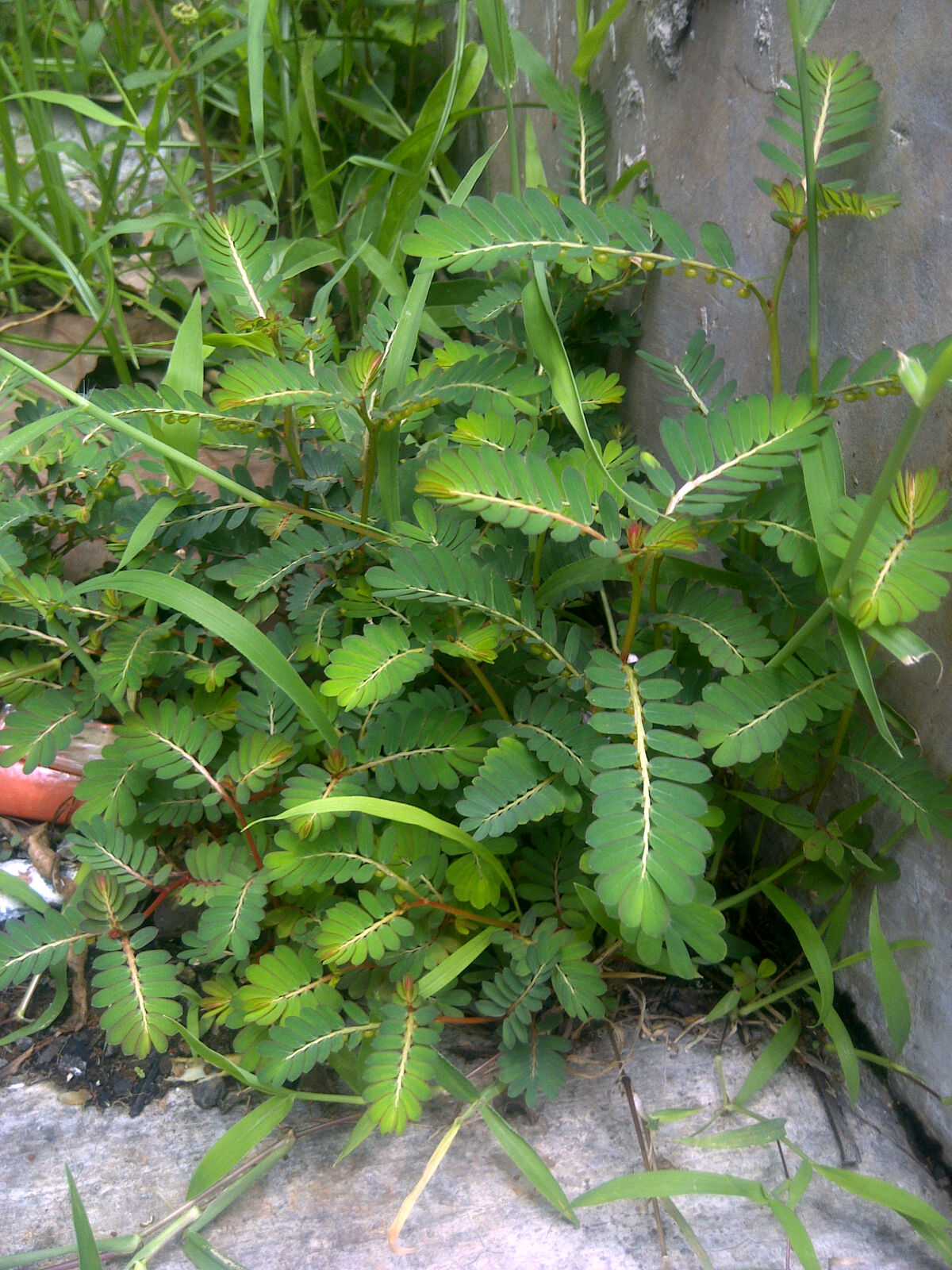
Foliage

== Distribution and habitat ==
Although of Asian origin, Phyllanthus urinaria is widely found in other regions of the world, including Mexico, Central America, South America, Australia, Africa, and the United States.

P. urinaria is a warm-season, tropical or subtropical species that prefers summer average temperatures greater than 10 degrees Celsius (50 degrees Fahrenheit) and winter average temperatures greater than 0 °C (32 °F). It has been reported in many habitats, including roadsides, disturbed lands, forests, cropland, and nurseries.

== Invasiveness ==
Phyllanthus urinaria is considered a competitive weed in some regions because of its numerous seeds, high shade tolerance, and extensive root system. It is a warm-season, annual, broadleaf plant that emerges from warm soils beginning in early summer.
