= Phyllanthus profusus =

Conservation status
- Vulnerable (IUCN 2.3)

Scientific classification
- Kingdom: Plantae
- Clade: Tracheophytes
- Clade: Angiosperms
- Clade: Eudicots
- Clade: Rosids
- Order: Malpighiales
- Family: Phyllanthaceae
- Genus: Phyllanthus
- Species: P. profusus

Binomial name
- Phyllanthus profusus N.E.Br.

Species of flowering plant

Phyllanthus profusus is a species of plant in the family Phyllanthaceae. It is a shrub native to tropical Africa, including Côte d'Ivoire, Ghana, Guinea, and Liberia in West Africa, and Cameroon and Republic of the Congo in west-central Africa. It is threatened by habitat loss.
