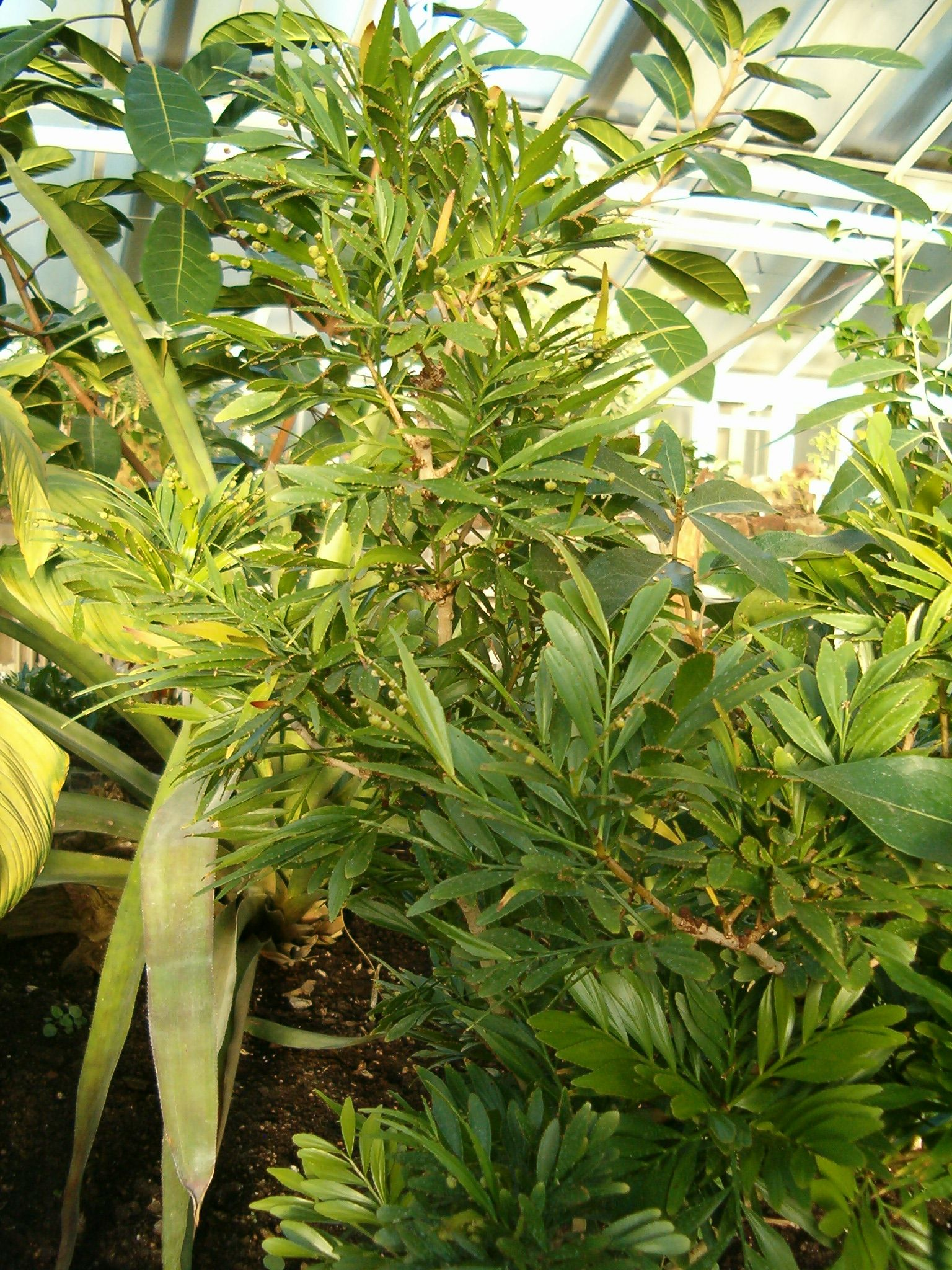

Conservation status
- Near Threatened (IUCN 2.3)

Scientific classification
- Kingdom: Plantae
- Clade: Tracheophytes
- Clade: Angiosperms
- Clade: Eudicots
- Clade: Rosids
- Order: Malpighiales
- Family: Phyllanthaceae
- Genus: Phyllanthus
- Species: P. arbuscula

Binomial name
- Phyllanthus arbuscula (Sw.) J.F.Gmel.

= Phyllanthus arbuscula =

Species of flowering plant

Phyllanthus arbuscula is a species of plant in the family Phyllanthaceae. It is endemic to Jamaica.
