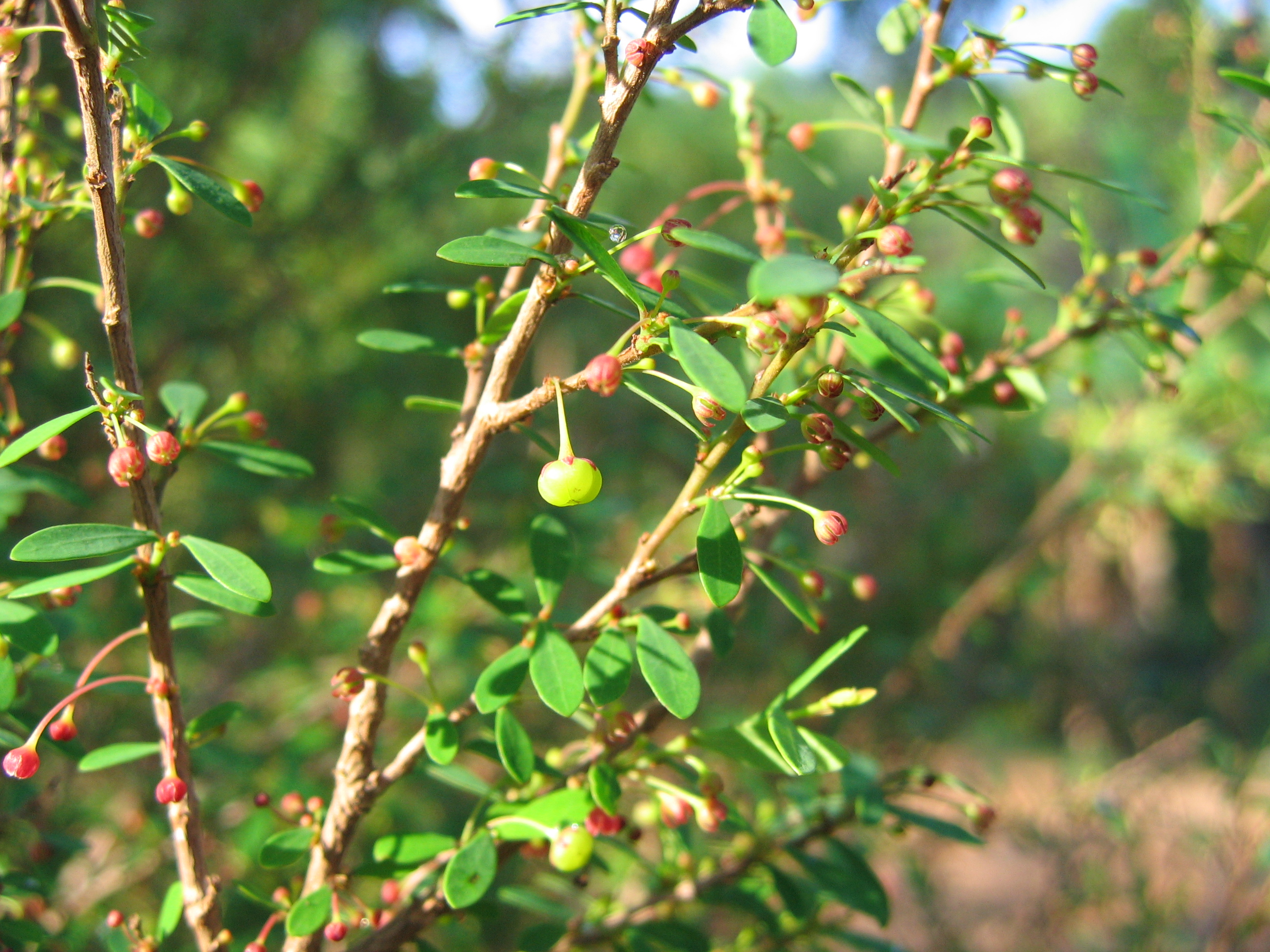

Scientific classification
- Kingdom: Plantae
- Clade: Tracheophytes
- Clade: Angiosperms
- Clade: Eudicots
- Clade: Rosids
- Order: Malpighiales
- Family: Phyllanthaceae
- Genus: Phyllanthus
- Species: P. myrtifolius

Binomial name
- Phyllanthus myrtifolius (Wight.) Muell. Arg.

Synonyms
- Diasperus myrtifolius (Wight) Kuntze; Macraea myrtifolia Wight; Phyllanthus myrtifolius Moon ex Hook. f.

= Phyllanthus myrtifolius =

Mousetail plant

Species of shrub

Phyllanthus myrtifolius, known as mousetail plant or myrtle-leaf leaf-flower, is a shrub belonging to the genus Phyllanthus of the family Phyllanthaceae endemic to island of Sri Lanka.

== Description ==
Leaves are numerous in 2-3's on suppressed branchlets, lanceolate-linear.

Stems are numerous, irregular; branchlets resemble pinnate leaves; B- vertically fissured; young parts finely pubescent.

Inflorescence - several together in lax clusters.

Fruits are purplish red to greenish, small, depressed, slightly 3-lobed, capsule.

== Habitat ==
Along water courses in forest; gardens.

== Uses ==
Hedges; ornamental.

== Culture ==
Known as ගඟ වැ‍රැල්ල (ganga werella) in Sinhala.
