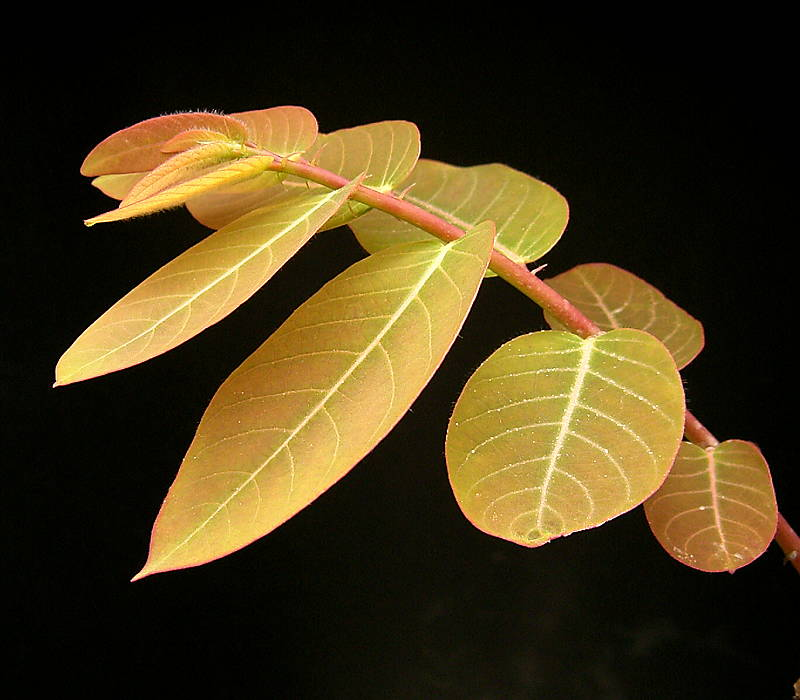
- Phyllanthus mirabilis
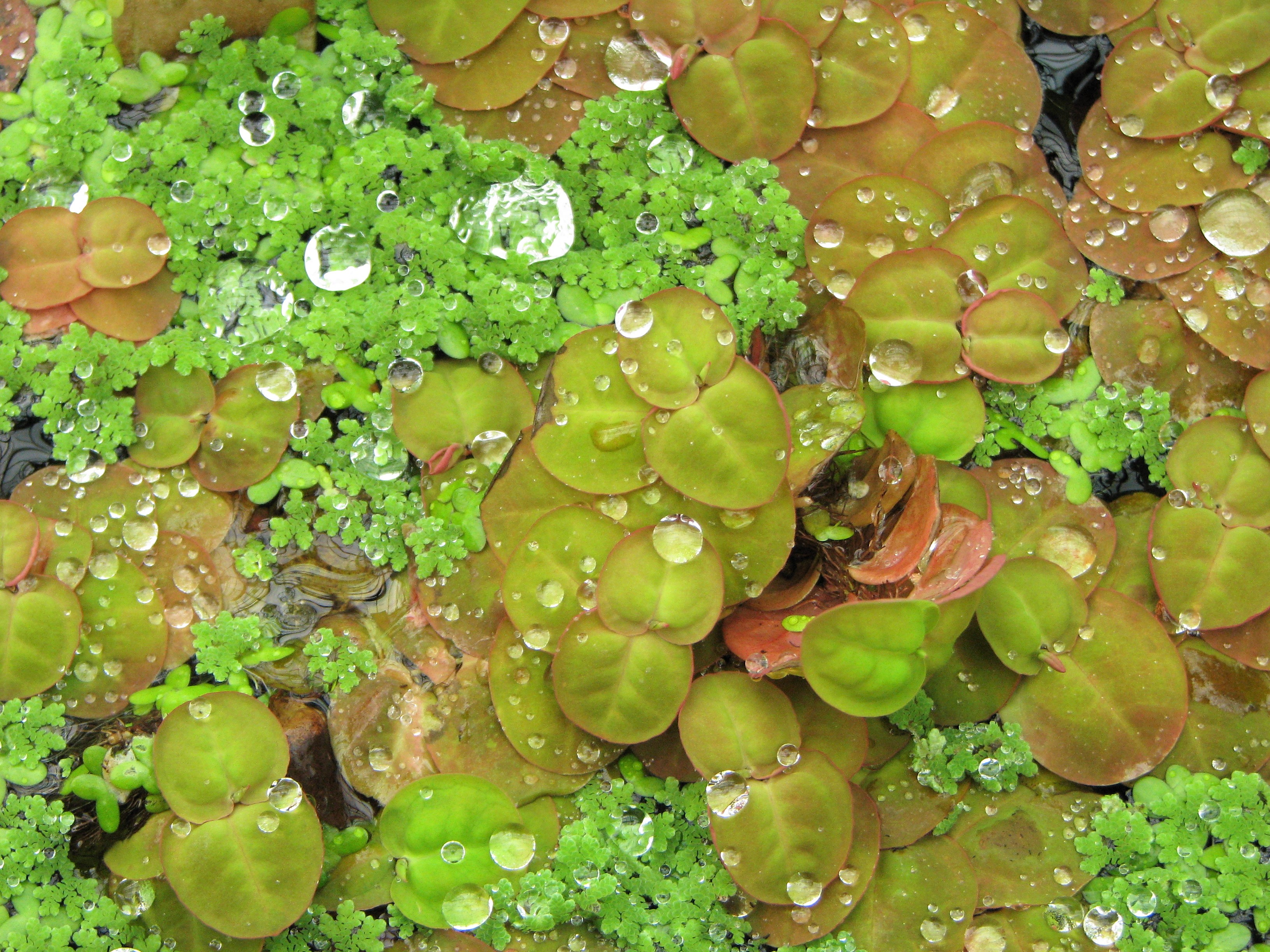
- Phyllanthus fluitans

Scientific classification
- Kingdom: Plantae
- Clade: Embryophytes
- Clade: Tracheophytes
- Clade: Angiosperms
- Clade: Eudicots
- Clade: Rosids
- Order: Malpighiales
- Family: Phyllanthaceae
- Subfamily: Phyllanthoideae
- Tribe: Phyllantheae
- Genus: Phyllanthus; L.

Diversity
- About 800 species

Synonyms
- List: Aalius Rumph. ex Kuntze; Agyneia L.; Anisonema A.Juss.; Aporosella Chodat; Arachnodes Gagnep.; Ardinghelia Comm. ex A.Juss.; Asterandra Klotzsch; Bradleia Banks ex Gaertn.; Breyniopsis Beille; Cathetus Lour.; Ceramanthus Hassk.; Ceratogynum Wight; Chorisandra Wight, nom. illeg.; Chlorolepis Nutt.; Chorizonema Jean F.Brunel; Cicca L.; Clambus Miers; Coccoglochidion K.Schum.; Conami Aubl.; Cycca Batsch; Dendrophyllanthus S.Moore; Diasperus L. ex Kuntze; Dichelactina Hance; Dichrophyllum Klotzsch & Garcke; Dimorphocladium Britton; Diplomorpha Griff.; Emblica Gaertn.; Episteira Raf.; Epistylium Sw.; Eriococcus Hassk.; Flueggeopsis K.Schum.; Foersteria Scop.; Forsteria Steud.; Geminaria Raf.; Genesiphyla Raf.; Genesiphylla L'Hér.; Genesiphylla L'Hér.; Glochidionopsis Blume; Glochisandra Wight; Gynoon A.Juss.; Hemicicca Baill.; Hemiglochidion (Müll.Arg.) K.Schum., nom. superfl.; Heterocalymnantha Domin; Hexadena Raf.; Hexaspermum Domin; Kirganelia Juss.; Leichhardtia F.Muell., nom. illeg. homonym. post.; Lomanthes Raf.; Lysiandra (F.Muell.) R.W.Bouman, I.Telford & J.J.Bruhl; Macraea Wight; Maschalanthus Nutt., nom. illeg.; Meborea Aubl.; Melanthesa Blume; Melanthesopsis Müll.Arg.; Menarda Comm. ex A.Juss.; Moeroris Raf.; Nellica Raf.; Niruri Adans.; Niruris Raf.; Nymania K.Schum.; Nymphanthus Lour.; Orbicularia Baill.; Oxalistylis Baill.; Phyllanthodendron Hemsl.; Pseudoglochidion Gamble; Ramsdenia Britton; Reidia Wight; Reverchonia A.Gray; Rhopium Schreb.; Roigia Britton; Sauropus Blume; Scepasma Blume; Staurothyrax Griff.; Synexemia Raf.; Tephranthus Neck., opus utique oppr.; Tetraglochidion K.Schum.; Tricarium Lour.; Uranthera Pax & K.Hoffm.; Urinaria Medik.; Williamia Baill.; Xylophylla L.; Zarcoa Llanos

= Phyllanthus =

Genus of flowering plants

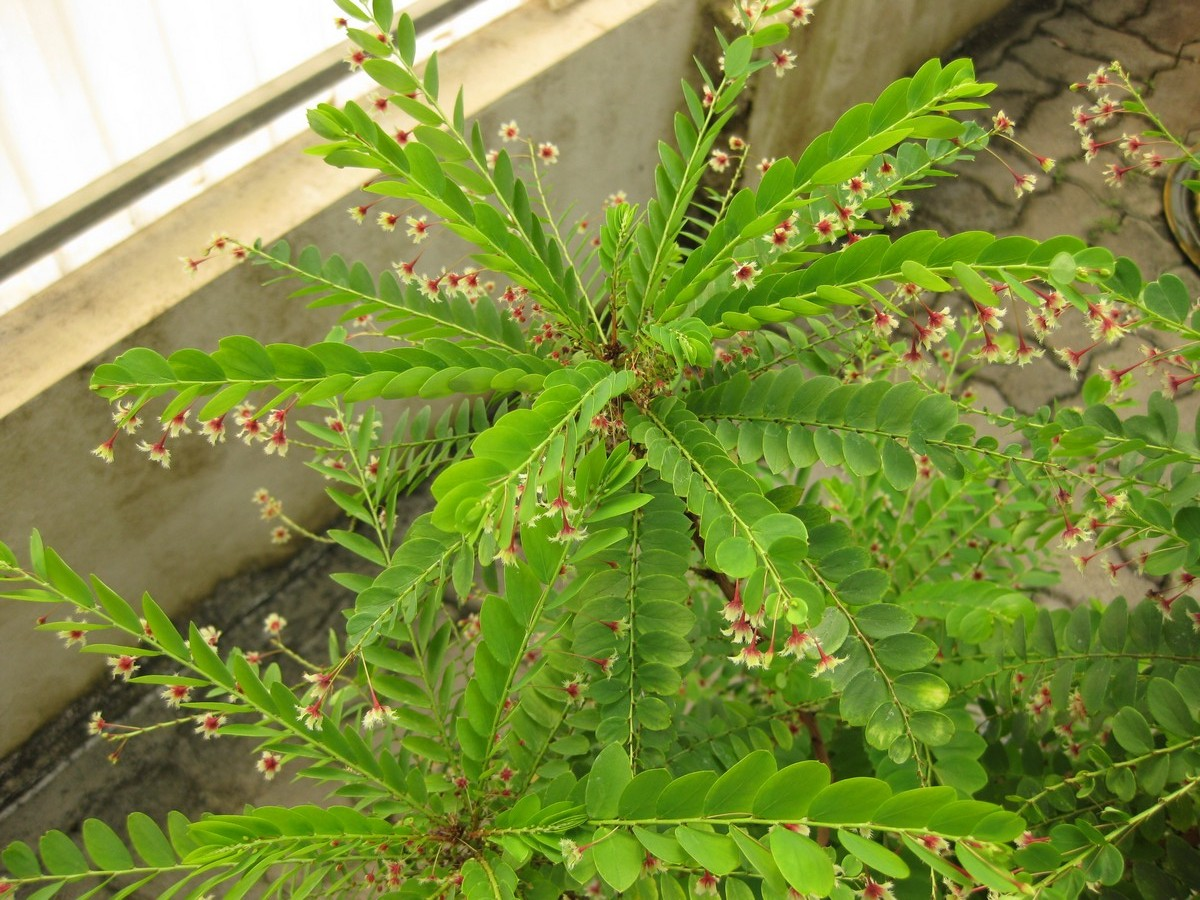
Plagiotropic shoots of Phyllanthus pulcher

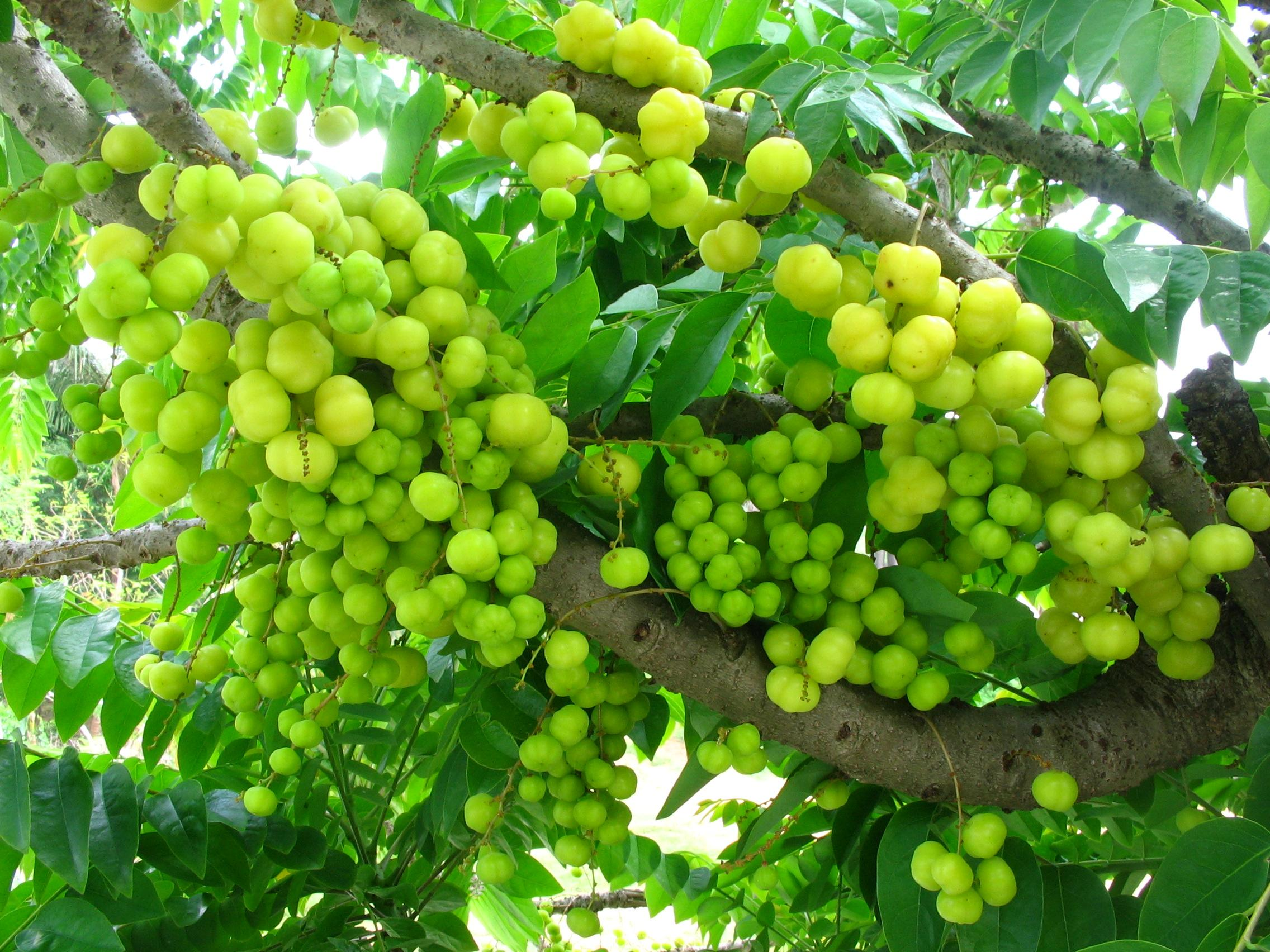
Fruit of Phyllanthus acidus

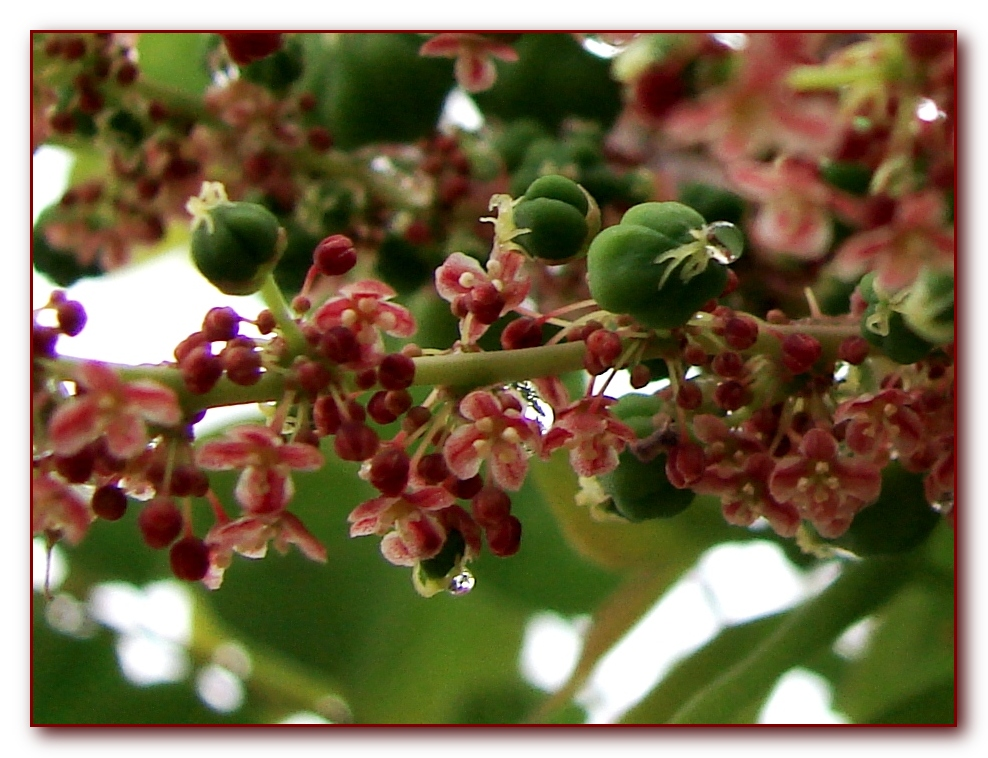
Male and female flowers of Phyllanthus acidus

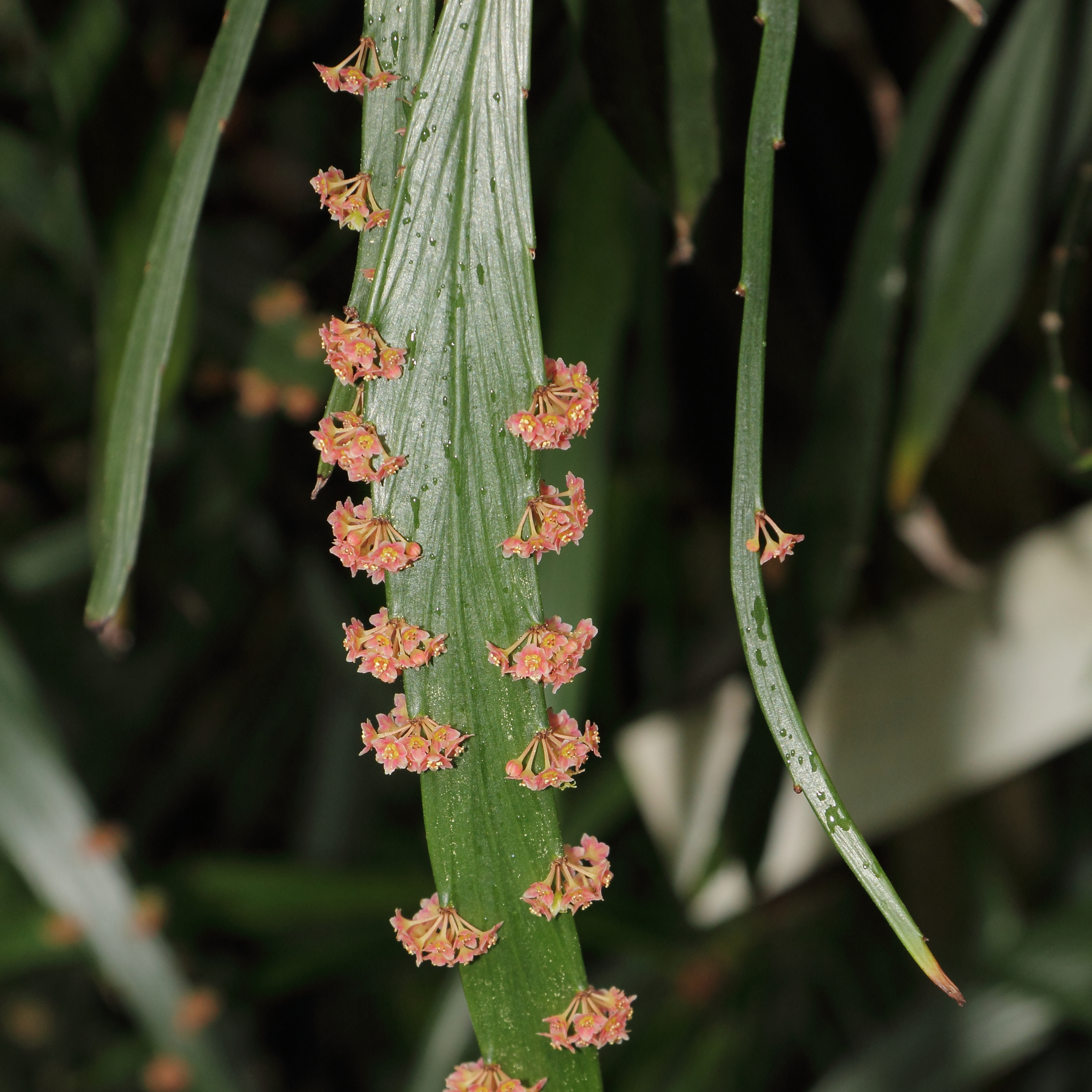
Flattened stems and flowers of Phyllanthus angustifolius

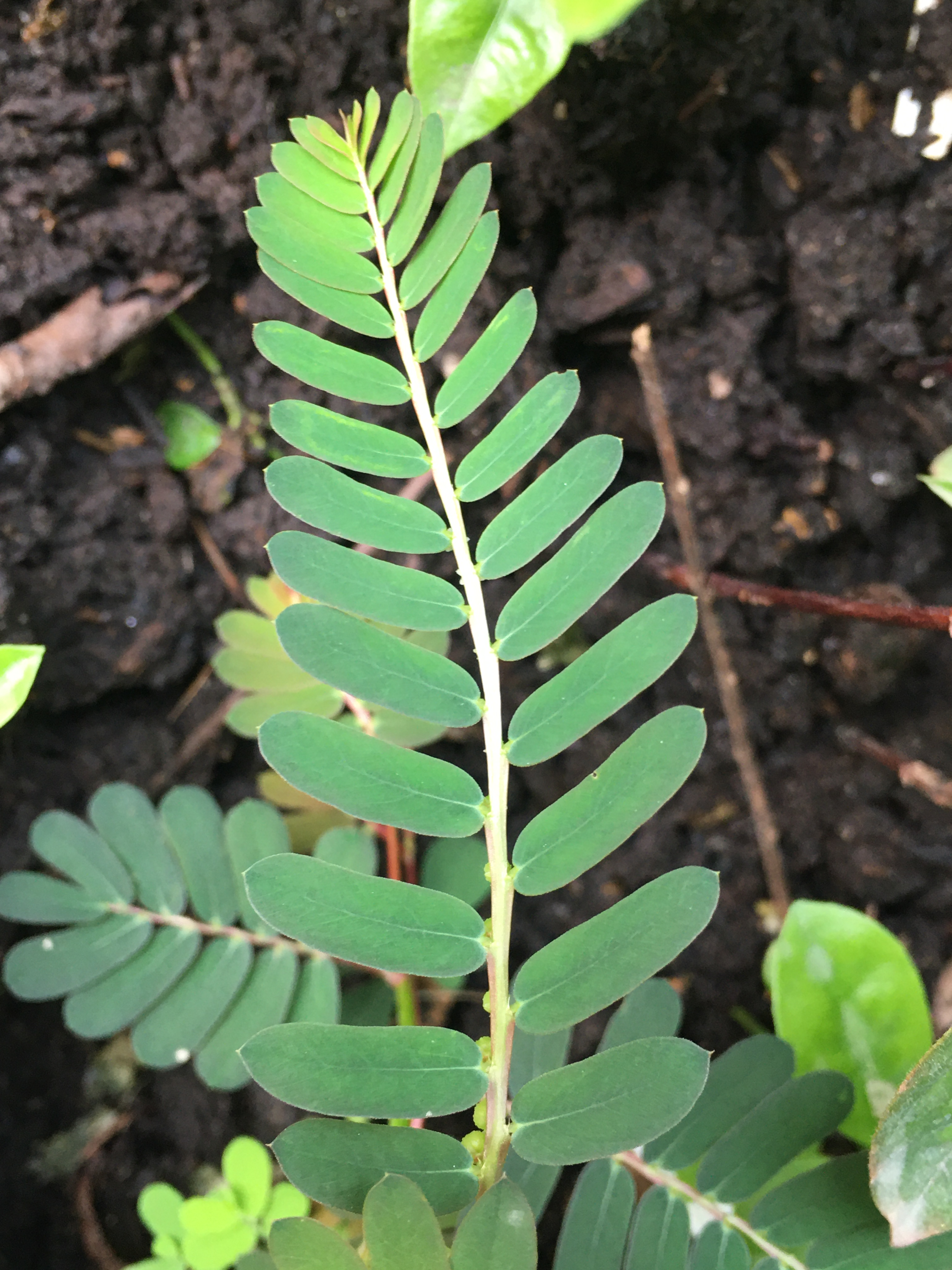
Leaves of Phyllanthus urinaria

Phyllanthus is the largest genus in the plant family Phyllanthaceae. Estimates of the number of species in this genus vary widely, from 750 to 1200. Phyllanthus has a remarkable diversity of growth forms including annual and perennial herbs, shrubs, climbers, floating aquatics, and pachycaulous succulents. Some have flattened leaflike stems called cladodes. It has a wide variety of floral morphologies and chromosome numbers and has one of the widest range of pollen types of any seed plant genus.

Despite their variety, almost all Phyllanthus species express a specific type of growth called "phyllanthoid branching" in which the vertical stems bear deciduous, floriferous (flower-bearing), plagiotropic (horizontal or oblique) stems. The leaves on the main (vertical) axes are reduced to scales called "cataphylls", while leaves on the other axes develop normally. Phyllanthus is distributed in all tropical and subtropical regions on Earth.

Phyllanthus was first described by Carl Linnaeus in 1753; the type species has subsequently been designated as Phyllanthus niruri.

== Taxonomy ==
The circumscription of this genus has been a cause of much confusion and disagreement. Molecular phylogenetic studies have shown that Phyllanthus is paraphyletic over Reverchonia, Glochidion, Sauropus, and Breynia. A 2006 revision of the family Phyllanthaceae has subsumed all four of these genera into Phyllanthus. This enlarged version of Phyllanthus might eventually be divided into smaller genera, including 32 Chinese (and northern Indochinese) species. A complete overhaul of the genus, including a new classification was underway in the 2020s, following an in-depth molecular treatment of major groups included. Proposed new genera are Breynia, Cathetus, Cicca, Dendrophyllanthus, Emblica, Flueggea, Glochidion, Heterosavia, Kirganelia, Lingelsheimia, Lysiandra, Margaritaria, Moeroris, Nellica, Nymphanthus, Phyllanthus (s.s.), Plagiocladus and Synostemon.

== Species ==
=== Selected species ===
- Phyllanthus abnormis Baill. – Drummond's leafflower
- Phyllanthus acidus (L.) Skeels – Otaheite gooseberry
- Phyllanthus acuminatus Vahl – Jamaican gooseberry tree
- Phyllanthus amarus Schumacher
- Phyllanthus anamalayanus (Gamble) G.L.Webster
- Phyllanthus angustifolius (Sw.) Sw.
- Phyllanthus arbuscula (Sw.) J.F.Gmel.
- Phyllanthus axillaris (Sw.) Müll.Arg.
- Phyllanthus brasiliensis (Aubl.) Poir.
- Phyllanthus caesiifolius Petra Hoffm. & Cheek
- Phyllanthus caroliniensis Walt. – native to the Americas
- Phyllanthus cauliflorus (Sw.) Griseb.
- Phyllanthus cladanthus Müll.Arg.
- Phyllanthus cochinchinensis (Lour.) Spreng.
- Phyllanthus coluteoides Baill. ex Müll.Arg.
- Phyllanthus cuneifolius (Britt.) Croizat
- Phyllanthus debilis Klein ex Willd.
- Phyllanthus distichus Hook. & Arn.
- Phyllanthus emblica L. – Indian gooseberry, also known as amla or amalaki.
- Phyllanthus engleri Pax
- Phyllanthus epiphyllanthus L.
- Phyllanthus ericoides Torr.
- Phyllanthus eximius G.L.Webster & Proctor
- Phyllanthus fadyenii Urb.
- Phyllanthus fluitans Benth. ex Müll.Arg. – red root floater, sometimes sold in aquarium shops
- Phyllanthus fraternus G.L.Webster
- Phyllanthus gentryi Webster
- Phyllanthus grandifolius L.
- Phyllanthus gunnii Hook.f.
- Phyllanthus hakgalensis
- Phyllanthus hirtellus F.Muell. ex Mull.Arg.
- Phyllanthus juglandifolius Willd.
- Phyllanthus lacunarius F.Muell.
- Phyllanthus latifolius (L.) Sw.
- Phyllanthus liebmannianus Muell.Arg.
- Phyllanthus maderaspatensis L.
- Phyllanthus microcladus Muell.Arg.
- Phyllanthus millei Standl.
- Phyllanthus mirabilis Müll.Arg. – one of the four succulent species of this genus
- Phyllanthus montanus (Sw.) Sw.
- Phyllanthus myrtifolius (Wight.) Muell.Arg.
- Phyllanthus muellerianus (Kuntze) Exell
- Phyllanthus niruri L. – Chanca piedra (Also includes P. amarus and P. debilis)
- Phyllanthus nyale Petra Hoffm. & Cheek
- Phyllanthus parvifolius Buch.-Ham. ex D.Don
- Phyllanthus pavonianus Baill.
- Phyllanthus pentaphyllus C.Wright ex Griseb.
- Phyllanthus phialanthoides Falcón & J.L.Gómez
- Phyllanthus polygonoides Nutt. ex Spreng. – Smartweed leafflower
- Phyllanthus polyspermus Shumach. & Thonn. – often misidentified as P. reticulatus
- Phyllanthus profusus N.E.Br.
- Phyllanthus pulcher Wallich ex Muell.Arg.
- Phyllanthus reticulatus Poir. – Asian sp. similar in appearance to P. polyspermus
- Phyllanthus revaughanii Coode
- Phyllanthus rufuschaneyi Welzen, R.W.Bouman & Ent
- Phyllanthus saffordii Merr.
- Phyllanthus salviifolius Kunth
- Phyllanthus sepialis Müll.Arg.
- Phyllanthus societatis Müll.Arg.
- Phyllanthus sponiifolius Müll.Arg.
- Phyllanthus stipulatus (Raf.) G.L. Webster
- Phyllanthus taxodiifolius Beille
- Phyllanthus tenellus Roxb.
- Phyllanthus urinaria L. – chamberbitter
- Phyllanthus virgatus G.Forst.
- Phyllanthus warnockii G.L.Webster
- Phyllanthus watsonii Airy Shaw
- Phyllanthus welwitschianus Müll.Arg.

== Fossil record ==
Two fossil seeds of a Phyllanthus species have been extracted from borehole samples of the Middle Miocene fresh water deposits in Nowy Sacz Basin, West Carpathians, Poland. The seeds are similar to seeds of the fossil species †Phyllanthus triquetra and †Phyllanthus compassica from the Oligocene and Miocene of West Siberia. Phyllanthus fossils are known from several Miocene and Pliocene sites in Poland.

== Pollination biology ==
Phyllanthus are of note in the fields of pollination biology and coevolution because some but not all species in the genus have a specialized mutualism with moths in the genus Epicephala (leafflower moths), in which the moths actively pollinate the flowers. While ensuring that the tree may produce viable seeds, the moths also lay eggs in the flowers' ovaries where their larvae consume a subset of the developing seeds as nourishment. Other species of Epicephala are pollinators of certain species of plants in the genera Glochidion and Breynia, both of which are phylogenetically nested within Phyllanthus.

== Research and traditional medicine ==
Particularly for its content of tannins, P. emblica fruit has a history of use in traditional medicine and is under study for its potential biological properties. Leaves, roots, stem, bark and berries of this genus contain lignans and other phytochemicals.
