= Phyllanthus sponiifolius =

Conservation status
- Endangered (IUCN 3.1)

Scientific classification
- Kingdom: Plantae
- Clade: Tracheophytes
- Clade: Angiosperms
- Clade: Eudicots
- Clade: Rosids
- Order: Malpighiales
- Family: Phyllanthaceae
- Genus: Phyllanthus
- Species: P. sponiifolius

Binomial name
- Phyllanthus sponiifolius Müll.Arg.

Species of flowering plant

Phyllanthus sponiifolius is a species of plant in the family Phyllanthaceae. It is native to Colombia and Ecuador. Its natural habitat is subtropical or tropical moist montane forests.
