= Phyllanthus rufuschaneyi =

Conservation status
- Endangered (IUCN 3.1)

Scientific classification
- Kingdom: Plantae
- Clade: Tracheophytes
- Clade: Angiosperms
- Clade: Eudicots
- Clade: Rosids
- Order: Malpighiales
- Family: Phyllanthaceae
- Genus: Phyllanthus
- Species: P. rufuschaneyi

Binomial name
- Phyllanthus rufuschaneyi Welzen, R.W.Bouman & Ent

Species of plant

Phyllanthus rufuschaneyi is a bioaccumulating plant from Sabah, Malaysia. It is known only from Ranau District on the lower slopes of Mount Kinabalu, up to 700 metres elevation. It grows on ultrabasic serpentinite-derived soils. It is threatened with habitat loss from deforestation.

It is harvested and burned, and the ash can contain up to 25% nickel.
