= Phyllanthus cladanthus =

Conservation status
- Near Threatened (IUCN 2.3)

Scientific classification
- Kingdom: Plantae
- Clade: Tracheophytes
- Clade: Angiosperms
- Clade: Eudicots
- Clade: Rosids
- Order: Malpighiales
- Family: Phyllanthaceae
- Genus: Phyllanthus
- Species: P. cladanthus

Binomial name
- Phyllanthus cladanthus Mull.

Species of flowering plant

Phyllanthus cladanthus is a species of plant in the family Phyllanthaceae. It is endemic to Jamaica.
