= Phyllanthus gentryi =

Conservation status
- Vulnerable (IUCN 3.1)

Scientific classification
- Kingdom: Plantae
- Clade: Tracheophytes
- Clade: Angiosperms
- Clade: Eudicots
- Clade: Rosids
- Order: Malpighiales
- Family: Phyllanthaceae
- Genus: Phyllanthus
- Species: P. gentryi

Binomial name
- Phyllanthus gentryi G.L.Webster

Species of flowering plant

Phyllanthus gentryi is a species of plant in the family Phyllanthaceae. It is a shrub or tree endemic to Panama. It is threatened by habitat loss.
