= Phyllanthus pavonianus =

Conservation status
- Endangered (IUCN 3.1)

Scientific classification
- Kingdom: Plantae
- Clade: Tracheophytes
- Clade: Angiosperms
- Clade: Eudicots
- Clade: Rosids
- Order: Malpighiales
- Family: Phyllanthaceae
- Genus: Phyllanthus
- Species: P. pavonianus

Binomial name
- Phyllanthus pavonianus Baill.

Synonyms
- Diasperus pavonianus (Baill.) Kuntze; Phyllanthus oxycladus Müll.Arg.; Phyllanthus haughtii Croizat

Species of plant

Phyllanthus pavonianus, synonym Phyllanthus haughtii, is a species of plant in the family Phyllanthaceae. It is native from south Ecuador to north-west Peru. Its natural habitat is subtropical or tropical moist montane forests. Under the synonym Phyllanthus haughtii, it has been regarded as "endangered".
