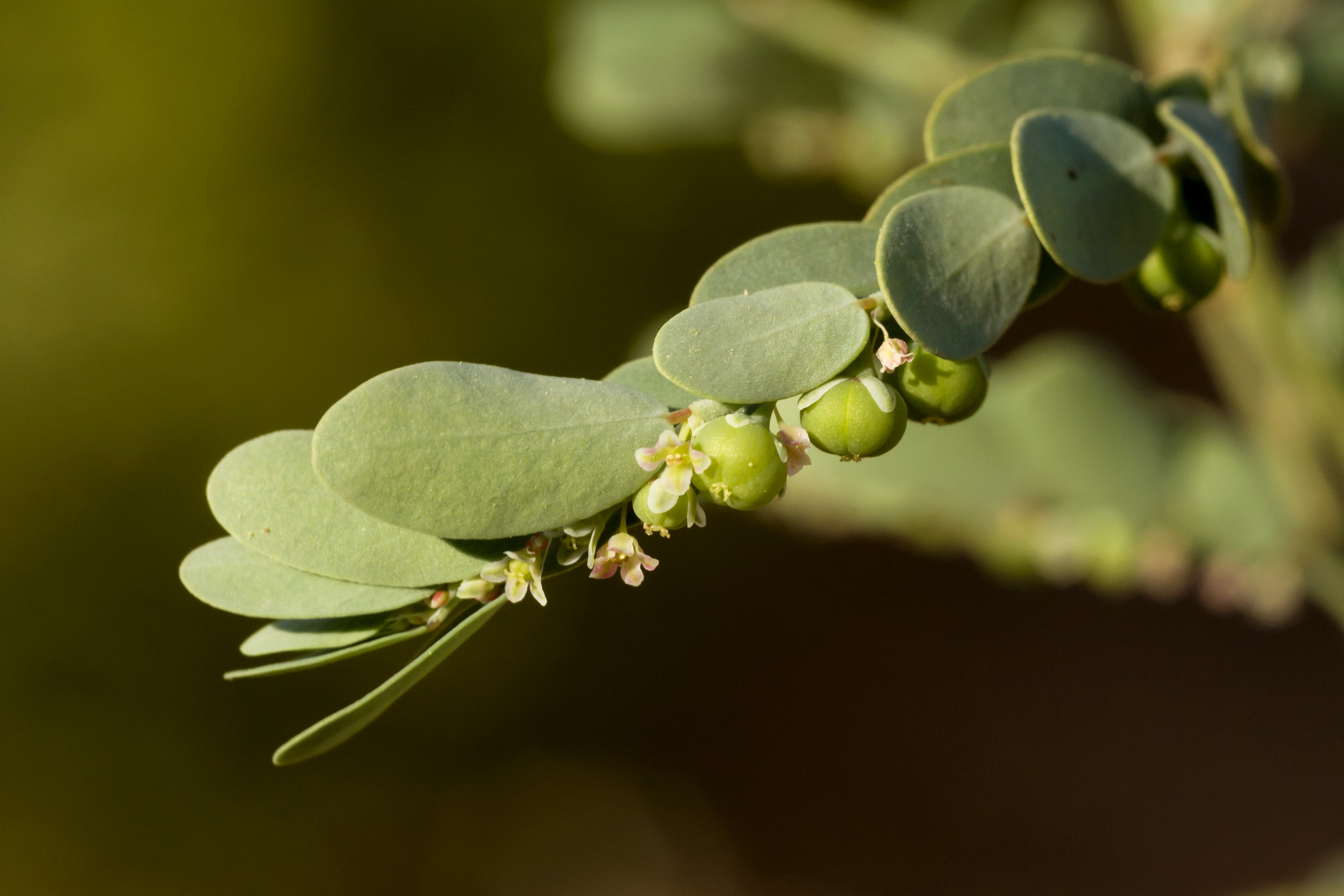

Scientific classification
- Kingdom: Plantae
- Clade: Tracheophytes
- Clade: Angiosperms
- Clade: Eudicots
- Clade: Rosids
- Order: Malpighiales
- Family: Phyllanthaceae
- Genus: Phyllanthus
- Species: P. abnormis

Binomial name
- Phyllanthus abnormis Baill.

= Phyllanthus abnormis =

Drummond's leafflower

Species of flowering plant

Phyllanthus abnormis, known as Drummond's leafflower, is an herbaceous plant in the family Phyllanthaceae. It grows from 10 to 50 centimeters in height. It is native to the United States (New Mexico, Texas, Oklahoma, and Florida) and Mexico (Tamaulipas). Throughout its range, it is always found growing in sand or sandy soil.

== Taxonomy ==
Current taxonomy divides this species into two varieties. P. abnormis var. abnormis, has a wide distribution in New Mexico, Texas, Oklahoma, Florida, and Tamaulipas, and is found in a variety of habitats including prairies, open oak woodlands, barrens, and dunes. P. abnormis var. riograndensis, or Rio Grande leafflower, is restricted to the Rio Grande Valley in Texas, where it grows in thornscrub, mesquite woodland, and sand or sandy soil. P. a. var. riograndensis has not been reported from adjacent areas of Mexico (Coahuila, Nuevo León, and Tamaulipas), but is to be expected there.

== Toxicity ==
Drummond's leafflower is toxic to sheep, cattle, and goats, although the toxic agent is not known.
