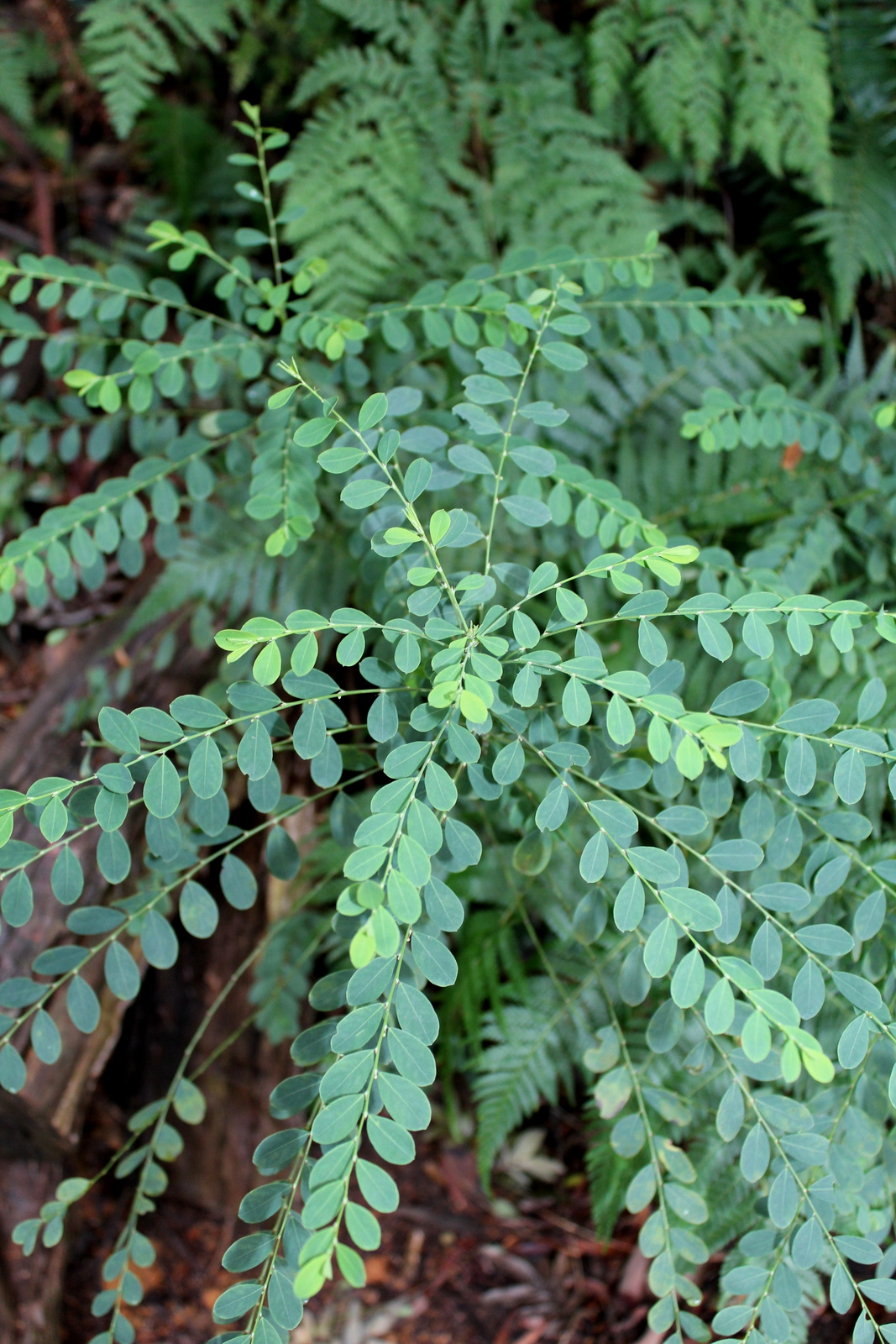
- Gulaga National Park, Australia

Scientific classification
- Kingdom: Plantae
- Clade: Tracheophytes
- Clade: Angiosperms
- Clade: Eudicots
- Clade: Rosids
- Order: Malpighiales
- Family: Phyllanthaceae
- Genus: Phyllanthus
- Species: P. gunnii

Binomial name
- Phyllanthus gunnii Hook.f.

Synonyms
- Phyllanthus gasstroemii Mull.Arg.

= Phyllanthus gunnii =

Species of flowering plant

Phyllanthus gunnii, the scrubby spurge, is a small plant growing in eastern and southern Australia, often on rocky forest sites near water.
