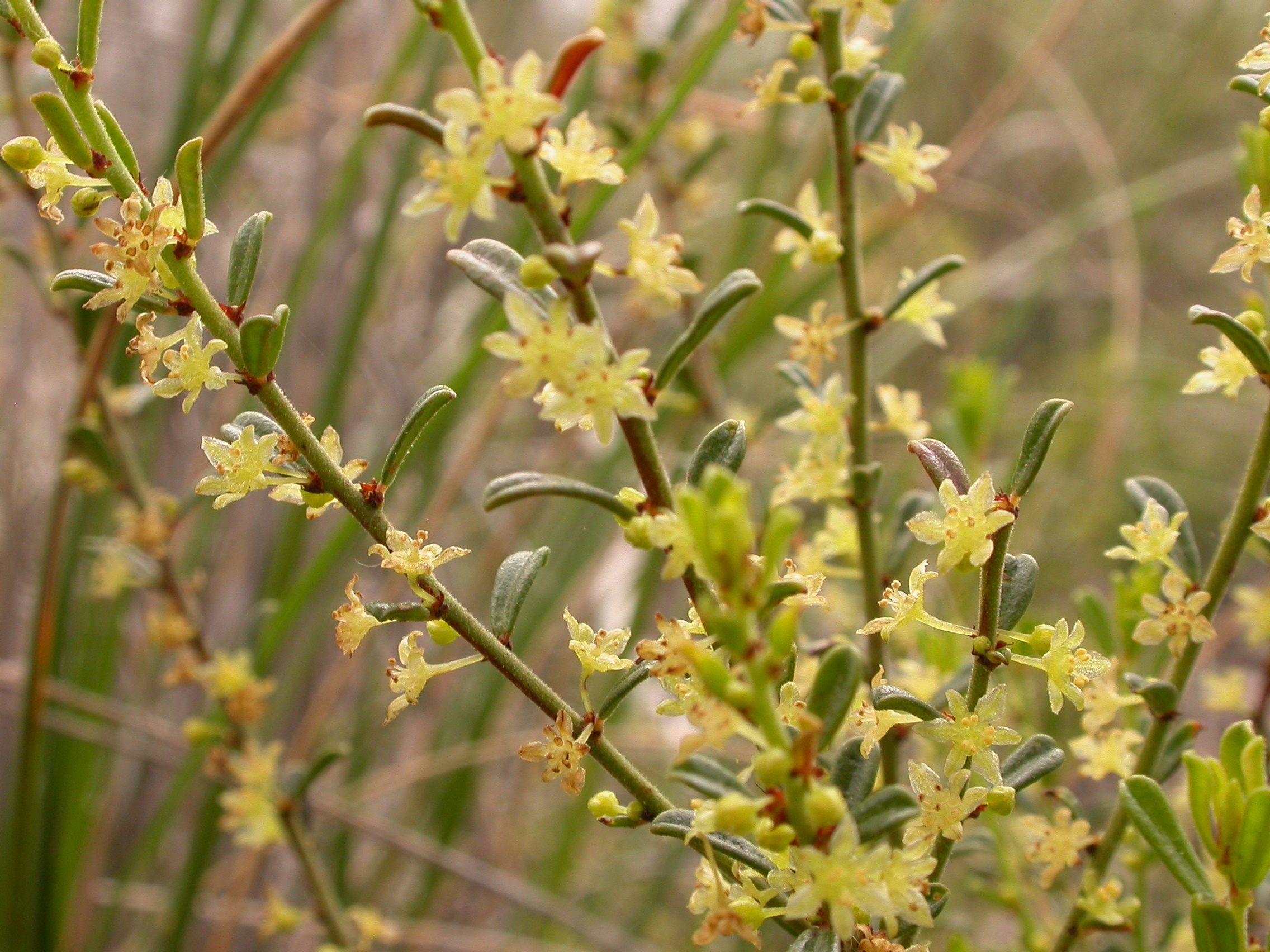
- Black Mountain (Australian Capital Territory)

Scientific classification
- Kingdom: Plantae
- Clade: Tracheophytes
- Clade: Angiosperms
- Clade: Eudicots
- Clade: Rosids
- Order: Malpighiales
- Family: Phyllanthaceae
- Genus: Phyllanthus
- Species: P. hirtellus

Binomial name
- Phyllanthus hirtellus F.Muell. ex Mull.Arg.

Synonyms
- Phyllanthus thymoides Müll.Arg.

= Phyllanthus hirtellus =

Species of plant

Phyllanthus hirtellus is a species of flowering plant in the family Phyllanthaceae. It is a miniature heath shrub, growing in erect or sprawling form. Stems are up to 30 cm long, leaves under 8 mm long. It is commonly found in heath or dry woodland in eastern Australia. The specific epithet hirtellus is derived from Latin, meaning finely hairy.
