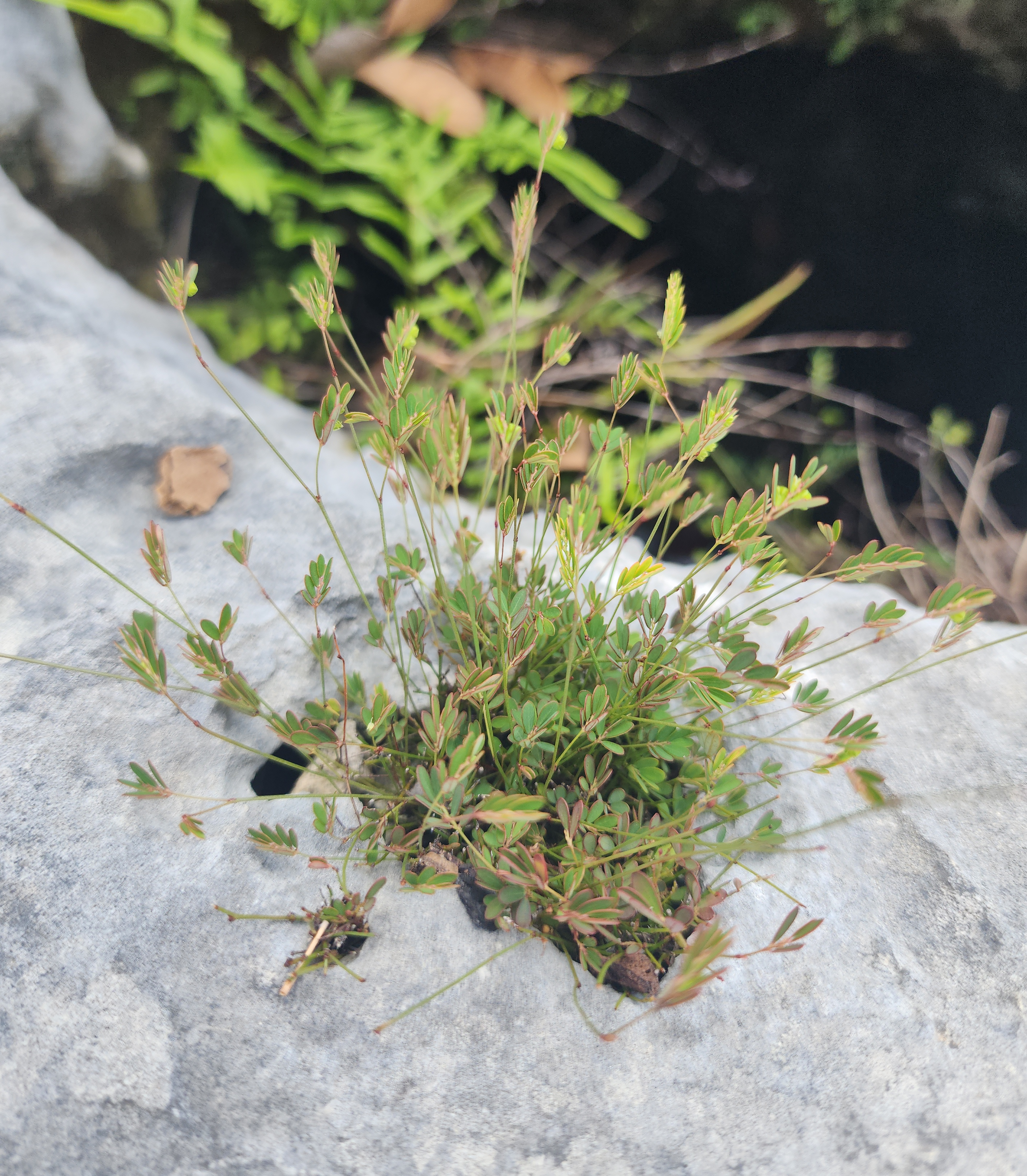
- Growing in open canopy pine rockland habitat

Conservation status
- Apparently Secure (NatureServe)

Scientific classification
- Kingdom: Plantae
- Clade: Tracheophytes
- Clade: Angiosperms
- Clade: Eudicots
- Clade: Rosids
- Order: Malpighiales
- Family: Phyllanthaceae
- Genus: Phyllanthus
- Species: P. pentaphyllus

Binomial name
- Phyllanthus pentaphyllus C.Wright ex Griseb.

= Phyllanthus pentaphyllus =

Species of flowering plant

Phyllanthus pentaphyllus, commonly referred to as fivepetal leafflower, is a species of flowering plant native to the Caribbean and south Florida.

== Habitat ==
As an obligate heliophyte, this species can only be found in the region's open canopy calcareous habitats, such as pine rockland, marl prairie, and related plant communities.
