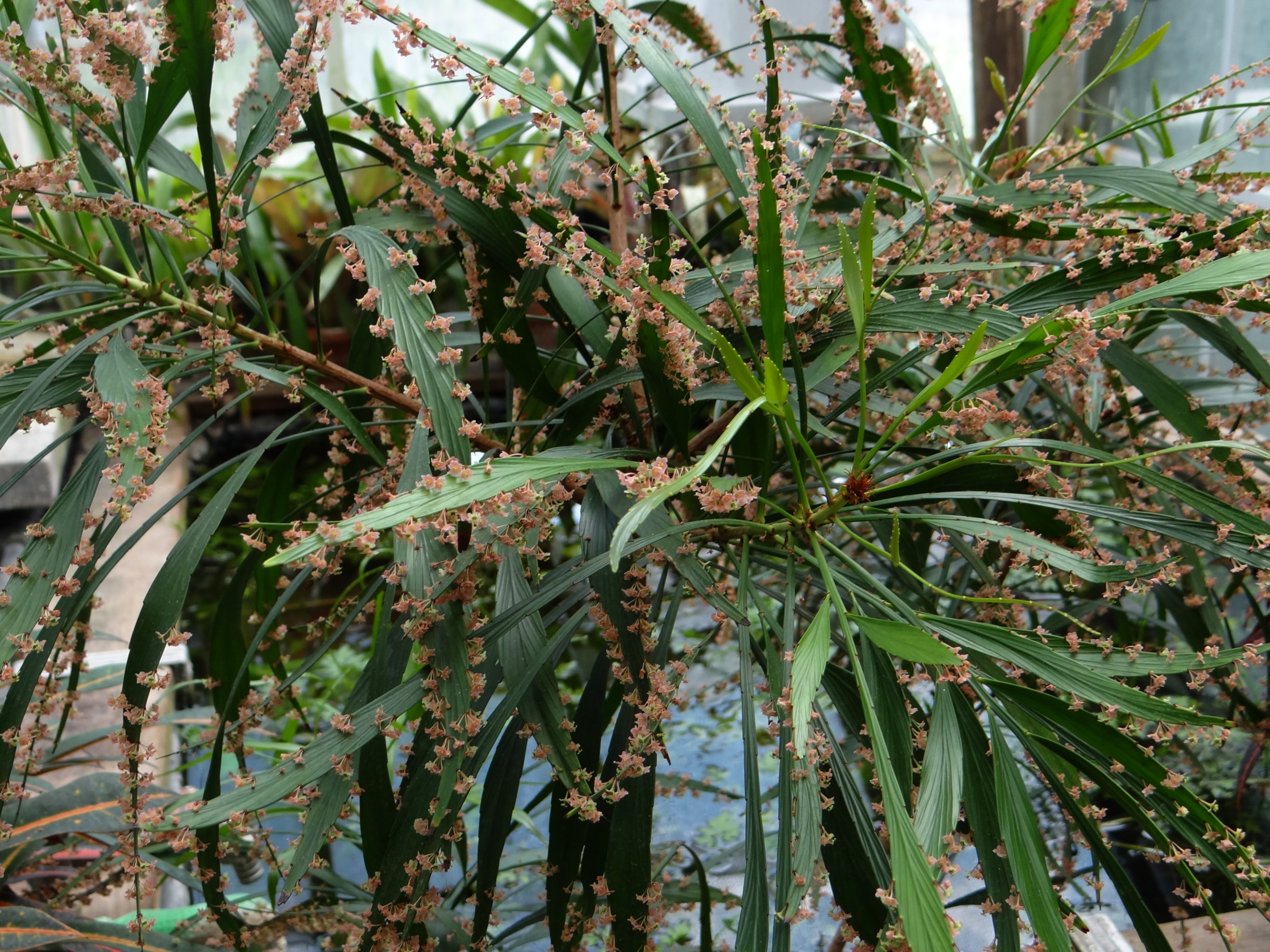

Conservation status
- Near Threatened (IUCN 2.3)

Scientific classification
- Kingdom: Plantae
- Clade: Tracheophytes
- Clade: Angiosperms
- Clade: Eudicots
- Clade: Rosids
- Order: Malpighiales
- Family: Phyllanthaceae
- Genus: Phyllanthus
- Species: P. latifolius

Binomial name
- Phyllanthus latifolius Sw.

= Phyllanthus latifolius =

Species of flowering plant

Phyllanthus latifolius is a species of plant in the family Phyllanthaceae. It is endemic to Jamaica. It is threatened by habitat loss.
