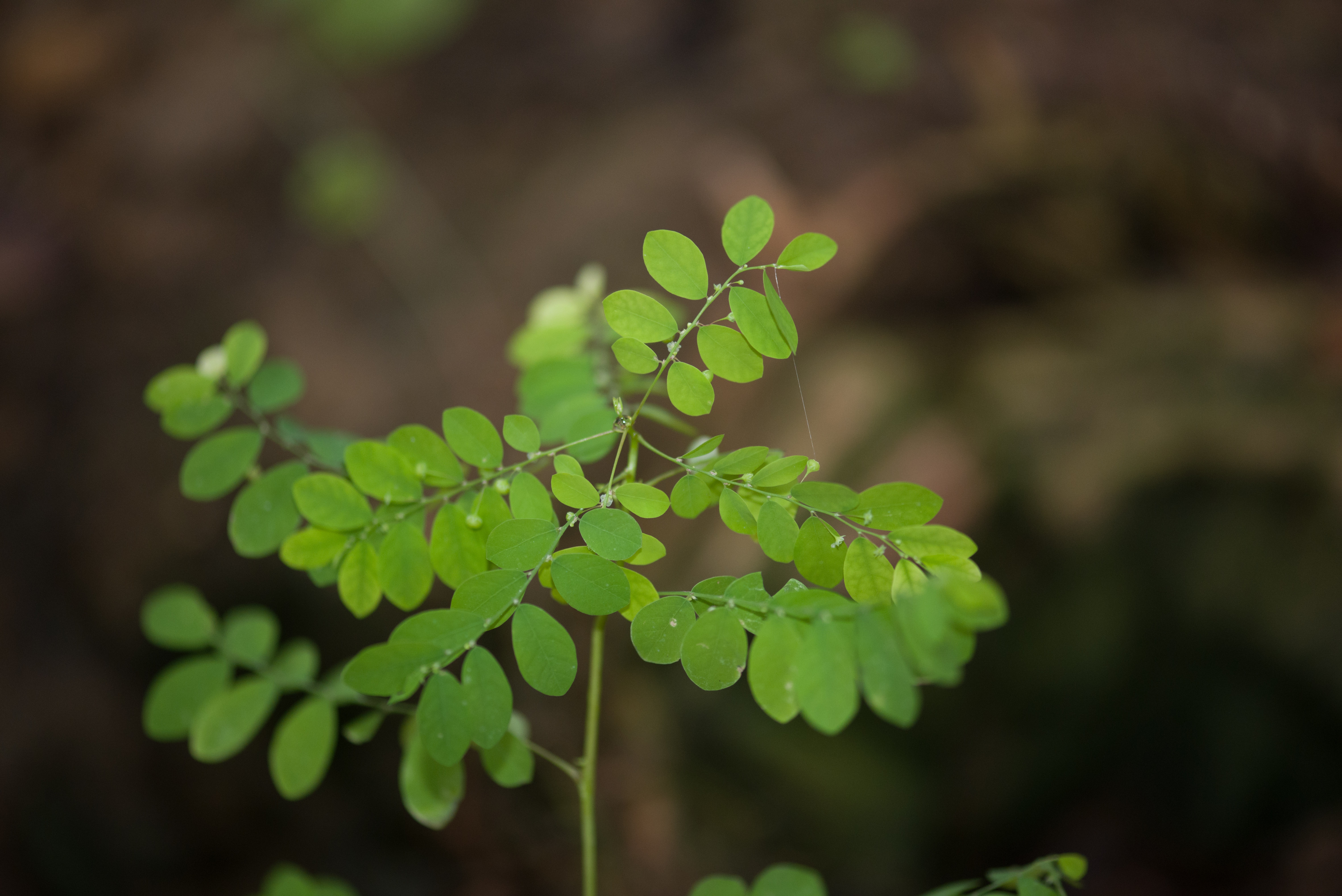
- Phyllanthus tenellus leaves, flowers, and fruits

Scientific classification
- Kingdom: Plantae
- Clade: Tracheophytes
- Clade: Angiosperms
- Clade: Eudicots
- Clade: Rosids
- Order: Malpighiales
- Family: Phyllanthaceae
- Genus: Phyllanthus
- Species: P. tenellus

Binomial name
- Phyllanthus tenellus Roxb.

Synonyms
- Diasperus tenellus (Roxb.) Kuntze; Phyllanthus nummulariaefolius Croizat

= Phyllanthus tenellus =

Species of flowering plant

Phyllanthus tenellus is a herbaceous plant in the leafflower family, Phyllanthaceae. It is commonly called Mascarene Island leaf flower as it is native to the Mascarene Islands. It is often a weed in flower beds, gardens, roadsides, and other disturbed areas.

== Description ==
It grows to be 20–50 cm (7.9–19.7 in) tall. The main stem does not have leaves but rather small scales (see phyllanthoid branching) and the secondary stems contain the flowers and leaves. The flowers are inconspicuous, small, and unisexual. Male and female flowers are located on the same plant.

== Taxonomy ==
It was originally published in William Roxburgh's 1814 Hortus Bengalensis (as a nomen nudum) and later validated in his 1832 Flora Indica.

It has two accepted varieties:

- Phyllanthus tenellus var. arabicus (Yemen, Saudi Arabia) Müll.Arg.
- Phyllanthus tenellus var. tenellus (Angola, Comoros, Madagascar, Mauritius, Mozambique, Réunion, Tanzania)

== Distribution ==
In addition to the Mascarene Islands, P. tenellus is possibly also native to eastern Africa, other western Indian Ocean islands, and the Arabian Peninsula. It has become a naturalized weed in tropical and subtropical areas, including Australia, Mexico, South America, Eastern North America (from Florida to Virginia west to California), as well as Mediterranean region, parts of Asia and the West Indies.
