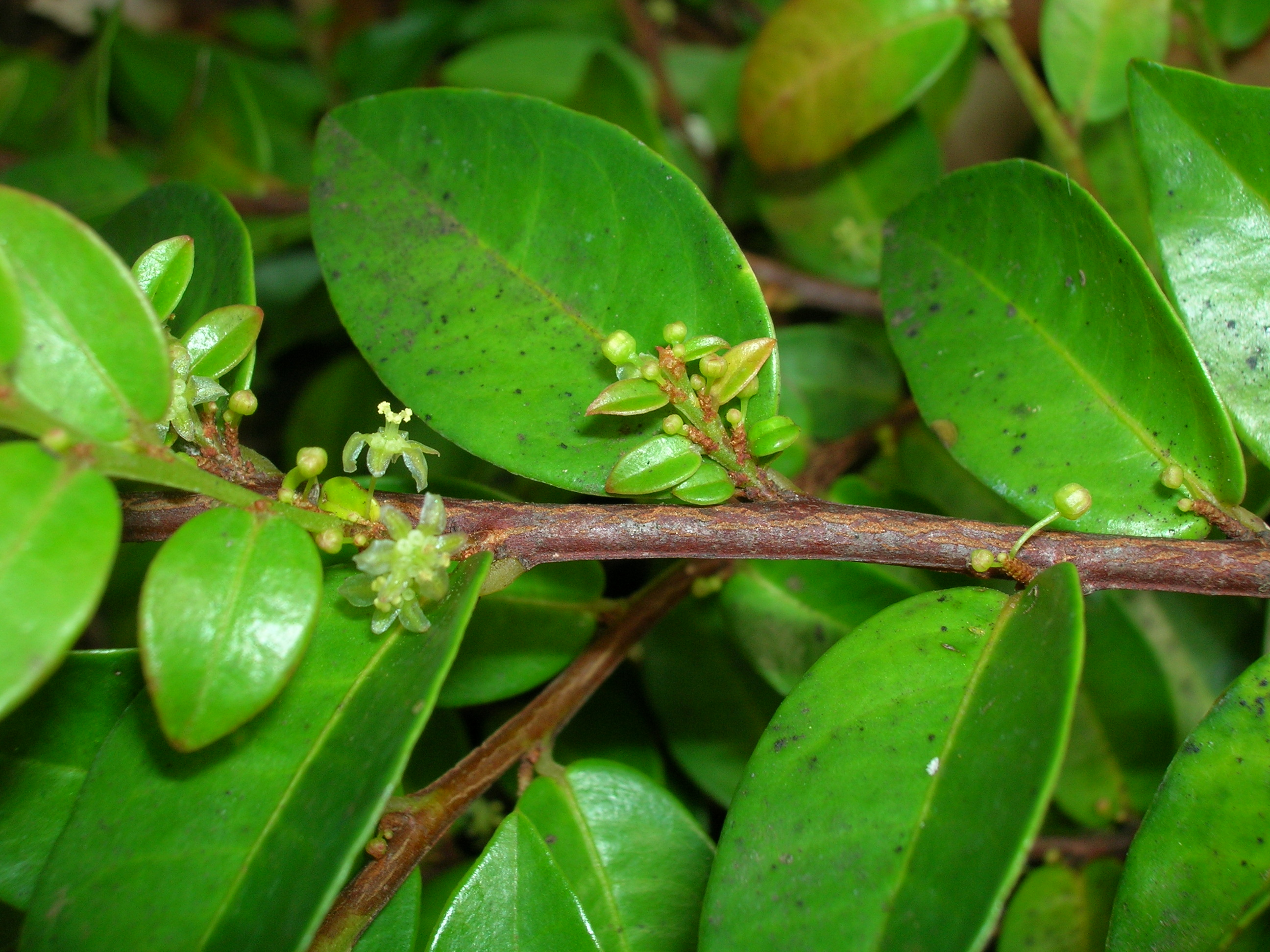

Scientific classification
- Kingdom: Plantae
- Clade: Tracheophytes
- Clade: Angiosperms
- Clade: Eudicots
- Clade: Rosids
- Order: Malpighiales
- Family: Phyllanthaceae
- Genus: Phyllanthus
- Species: P. distichus

Binomial name
- Phyllanthus distichus Hook. & Arn.

= Phyllanthus distichus =

Species of flowering plant

Phyllanthus distichus is a species of flowering plant in the family Phyllanthaceae, native to the Hawaiian Islands.
