= Phyllanthus mirabilis =

Conservation status
- Least Concern (IUCN 3.1)

Scientific classification
- Kingdom: Plantae
- Clade: Tracheophytes
- Clade: Angiosperms
- Clade: Eudicots
- Clade: Rosids
- Order: Malpighiales
- Family: Phyllanthaceae
- Genus: Phyllanthus
- Species: P. mirabilis

Binomial name
- Phyllanthus mirabilis Müll.Arg.

Synonyms
- Diasperus mirabilis (Müll.Arg.) Kuntze; Phyllanthodendron mirabile (Müll.Arg.) Hemsl.

Species of flowering plant

Phyllanthus mirabilis is a plant species of family Phyllanthaceae and is native to Thailand, Laos and Myanmar. It is one of the only four Phyllanthus to be caudiciform and one of the only two caudiciform Phyllanthus to be described, with the other being Phyllanthus kaweesakii. The leaves fold together at night. Wild plants are found on limestone mountains and cliffs.

leaves folded together at night
