= Eurema brigitta =

- Eurema brigitta brigitta Arusha National Park, Tanzania

Conservation status
- Least Concern (IUCN 3.1)

Scientific classification
- Kingdom: Animalia
- Phylum: Arthropoda
- Clade: Pancrustacea
- Class: Insecta
- Order: Lepidoptera
- Family: Pieridae
- Genus: Eurema
- Species: E. brigitta

Binomial name
- Eurema brigitta (Cramer, 1780)

Synonyms
- Papilio brigitta Stoll, [1780]; Maiva sulphurea Grose-Smith & Kirby, 1893; Xanthidia pulchella Boisduval, 1833; Terias drona Horsfield, [1829]; Terias senna C. & R. Felder, [1865]; Terias fruhstorferi Moore, 1906; Terias hainana Moore, 1878; Terias rubella Wallace, 1867; Papilio libythea Fabricius, 1798; Terias australis Wallace, 1867

Species of butterfly

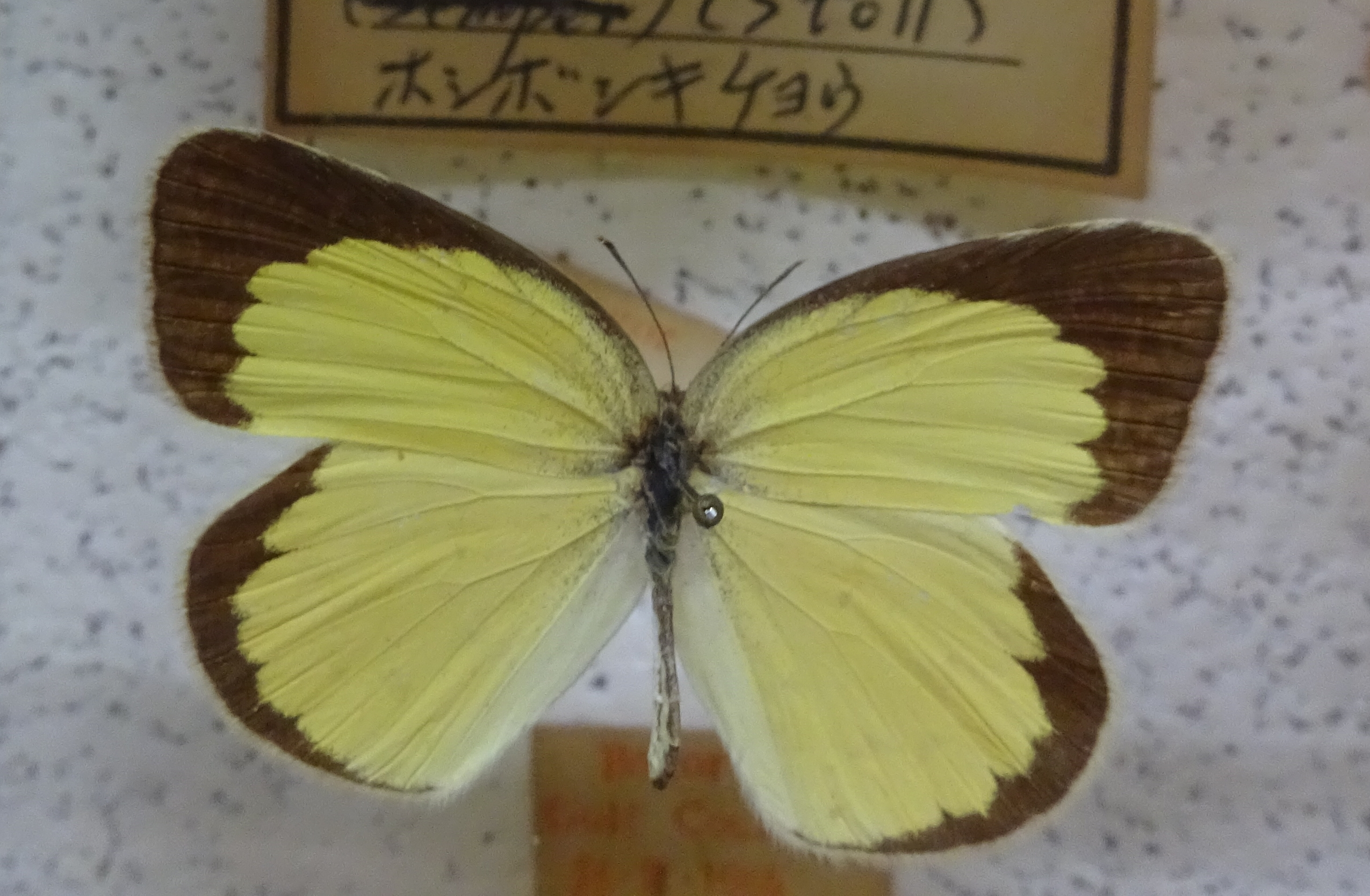
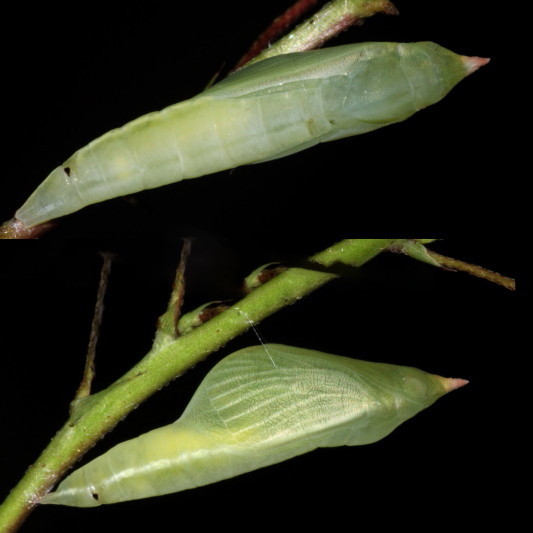
Upper side of male imago (above), showing the dark borders, and the pupa (below)

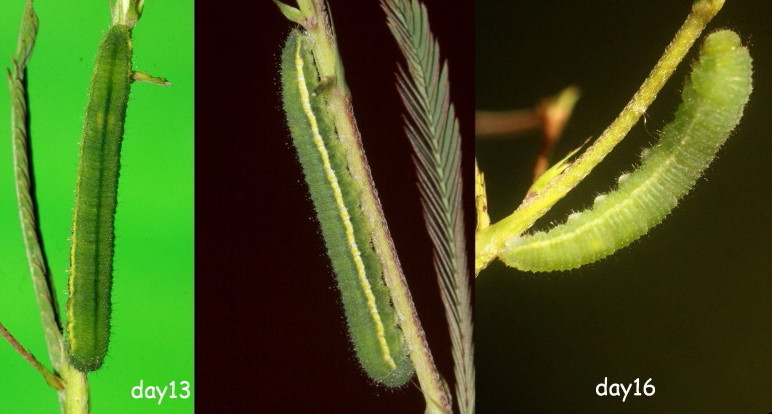
Final instar caterpillar

Eurema brigitta, the small grass yellow or broad-bordered grass yellow, is a small butterfly of the family Pieridae, that is, the yellows and whites. It is found in India, other parts of Asia, Australia and Africa.

== Description ==
Wet-season form: Male. Upper-side somewhat paler yellow. Fore-wing with the outer marginal black band; the apical edge of costa and the cilia rosy-red. Hind-wing with the black outer band somewhat narrower, macular, the decreasing portions each with a more prolonged inner-tooth, and the yellow ground-colour between each extending to the outer edge. Underside pale yellow, the fore-wing also having a very slightly defined sub-apical inwardly-oblique squamous streak. Fore-wing with the entire costal edge and outer marginal cilia, and also the outer marginal cilia of the hind-wing, rosy-red. Female. Upper-side. Apical edge between the subcostals of fore-wing, and cilia of both wings paler rosy-red. Underside with the markings on hind-wing slightly visible. Fore-wing above with the black outer band broken beneath the lower median veinlet. Hind-wing with the outer band similar to male, its portions slightly broader. Underside similar to male, the markings being slightly more defined.

Intermediate form: Male. Upper-side. Fore-wing with the outer band slightly narrower than in wet form; cilia paler red. Hind-wing with the marginal macular band narrower, and composed of smaller portions. Underside similar to wet form. Female. Upperside. Fore-wing with the outer band less broken at its posterior end than in wet form. Hind-wing with the marginal macular band less distinct and narrower. Underside similar to the male.

Dry-season form: Both sexes much smaller than in intermediate form. Cilia paler. Male. Fore-wing above with the inner-edge of the marginal band less sinuated than in intermediate form, its posterior end indistinctly broken. Hind-wing with the lower portions of the macular band somewhat larger and less dentate. Underside. Both wings with less defined markings than in intermediate form. Female. Upper-side. Fore-wing with the band slightly broken at posterior end. Hind-wing with the lower portions of band somewhat wider. Underside with the markings indistinct.

— Charles Swinhoe, Lepidoptera Indica. Vol. VII

The wingspan is 30–35 mm. Adults are on the wing year-round.

== Food plants ==
The larvae feed on Hypericum aethiopicum and Chamaecrista mimosoides.

== Taxonomic revision ==
In 2022, the species was split through phylogeographic pattern of by comparing Afrotropical, Malagasy and Oriental-Australian populations using the mitochondrial cytochromec oxidase subunit I marker. After the taxonomic revision, Afrotropical and Oriental-Australian populations were separated by the Indian Ocean and dry habitats on the northern coasts. Therefore now the Oriental-Australian populations into a separate species, Eurema drona.

== Subspecies ==
- Eurema brigitta brigitta – tropical Africa
- Eurema brigitta pulchella (Boisduval, 1833) – Madagascar, Mauritius, Comoro Islands, Aldabra Islands
- Eurema brigitta drona (Horsfield, [1829]) – Sumatra, Java to Lombok - see Eurema drona
- Eurema brigitta senna (C.&R.Felder, [1865]) – Peninsular Malaya, Singapore, Indochina
- Eurema brigitta fruhstorferi (Moore, 1906) – eastern Indo-China
- Eurema brigitta ina Eliot, 1956 – southern Sulawesi
- Eurema brigitta hainana (Moore, 1878) – Hainan
- Eurema brigitta rubella (Wallace, 1867) – Sri Lanka, India, Burma to southern China, Nicobars
- Eurema brigitta formosana Matsumura, 1919 – Taiwan
- Eurema brigitta yunnana (Mell)
- Eurema brigitta australis (Wallace, 1867) – Australia, New Guinea, Papua New Guinea

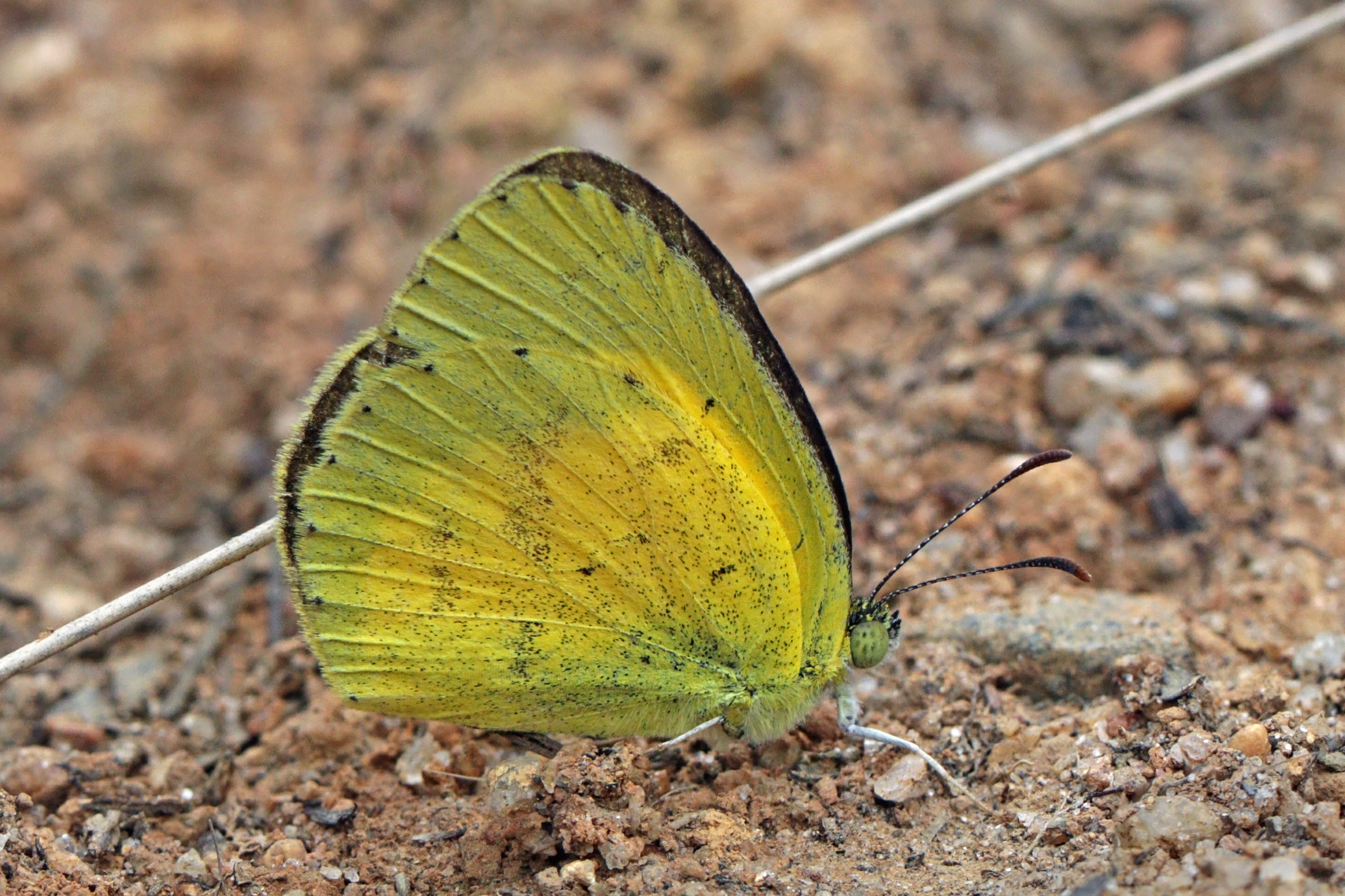
E. b. pulchella, Madagascar

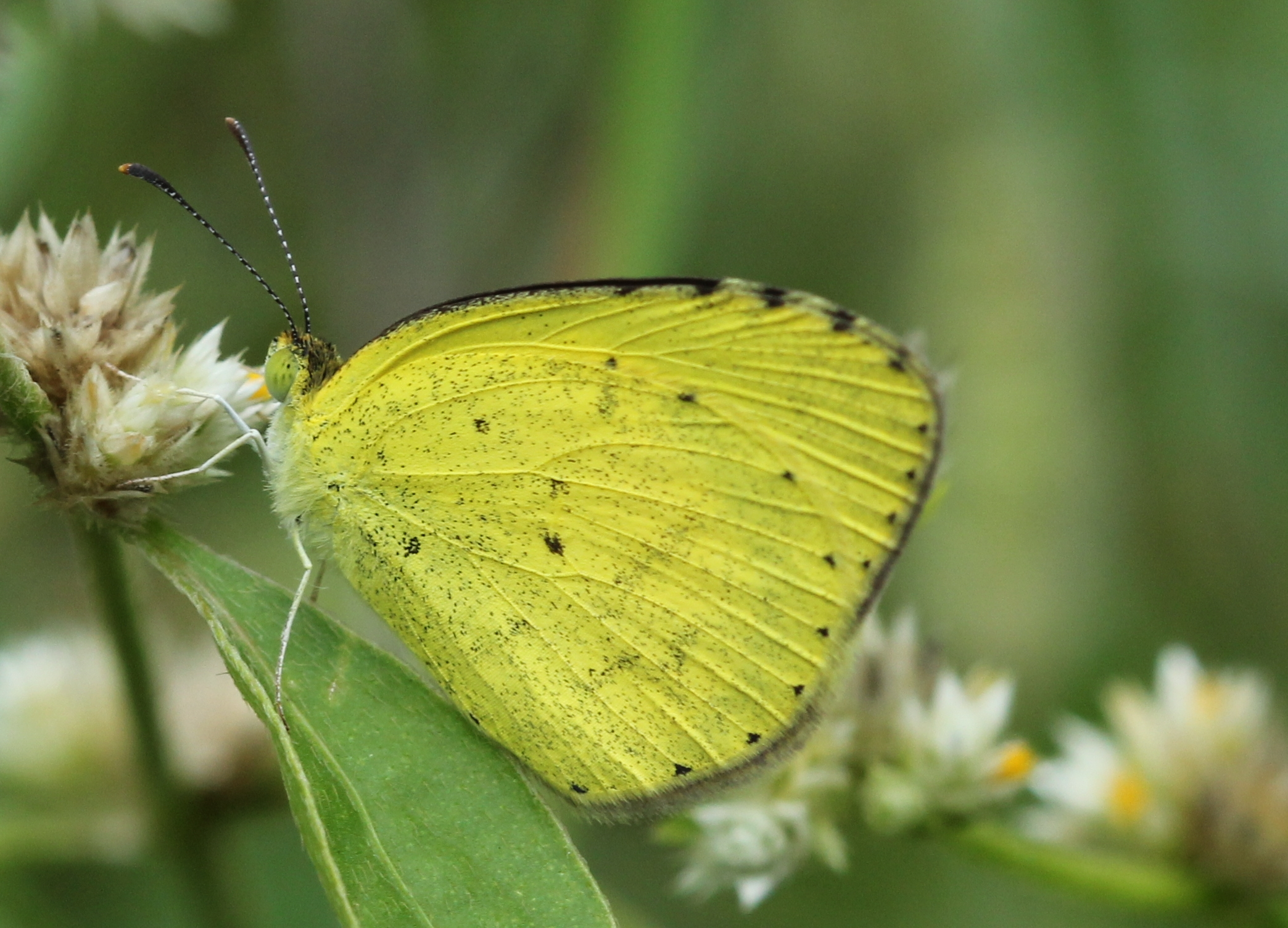
E. b. rubella, Bangalore, India

== See also ==
- List of butterflies of India
- List of butterflies of India (Pieridae)
