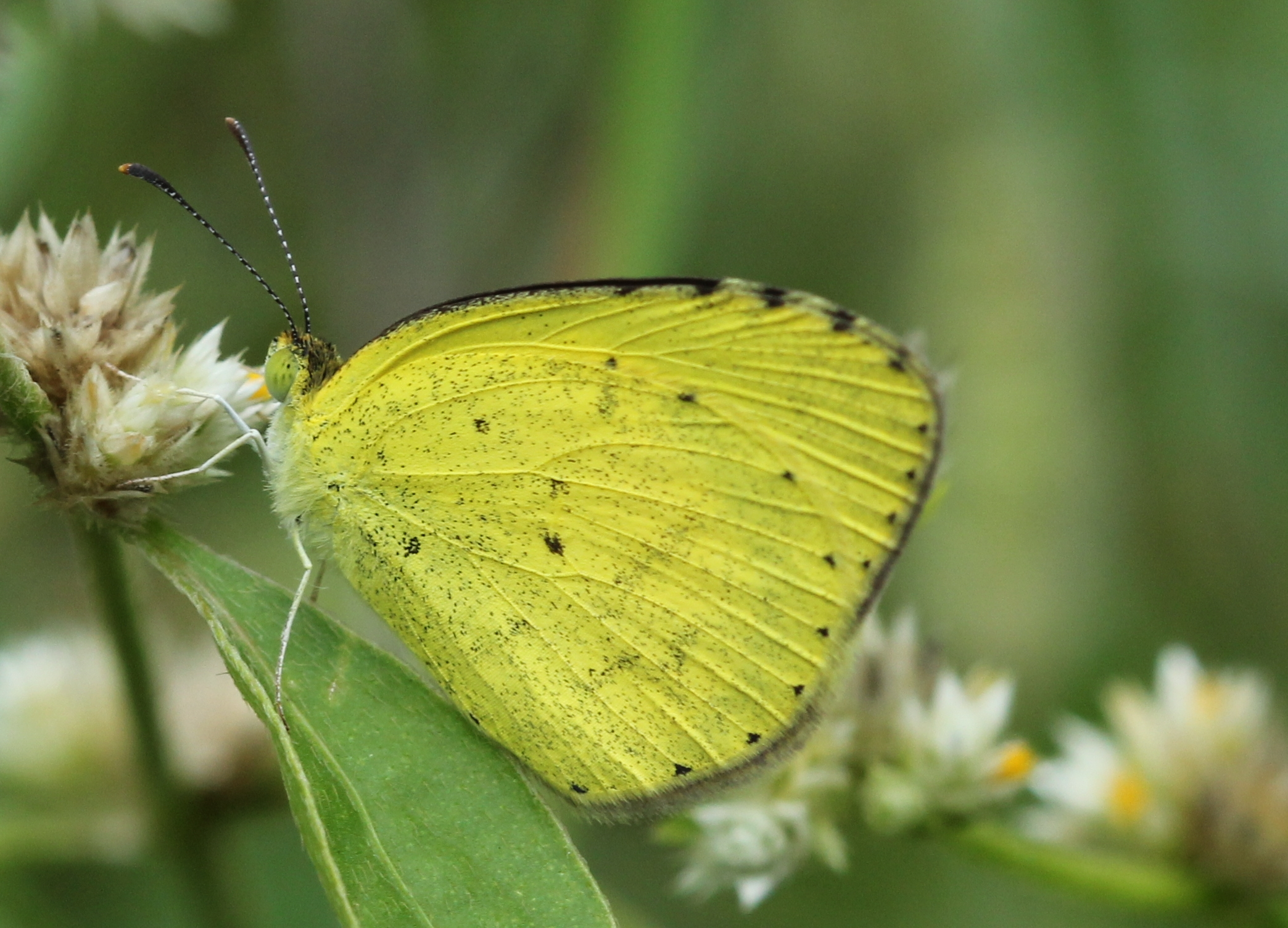

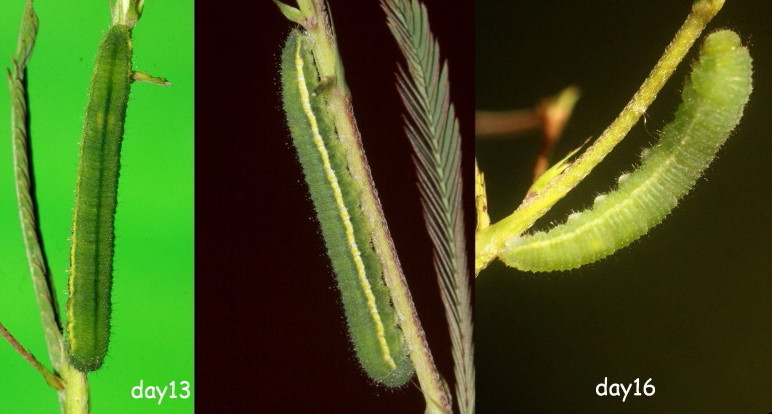
- Imago (above) and final instars (below)

Scientific classification
- Kingdom: Animalia
- Phylum: Arthropoda
- Clade: Pancrustacea
- Class: Insecta
- Order: Lepidoptera
- Family: Pieridae
- Genus: Eurema
- Species: E. drona

Binomial name
- Eurema drona (Horsfield, 1829)

Synonyms
- See text

= Eurema drona =

Small grass yellow

Species of butterfly

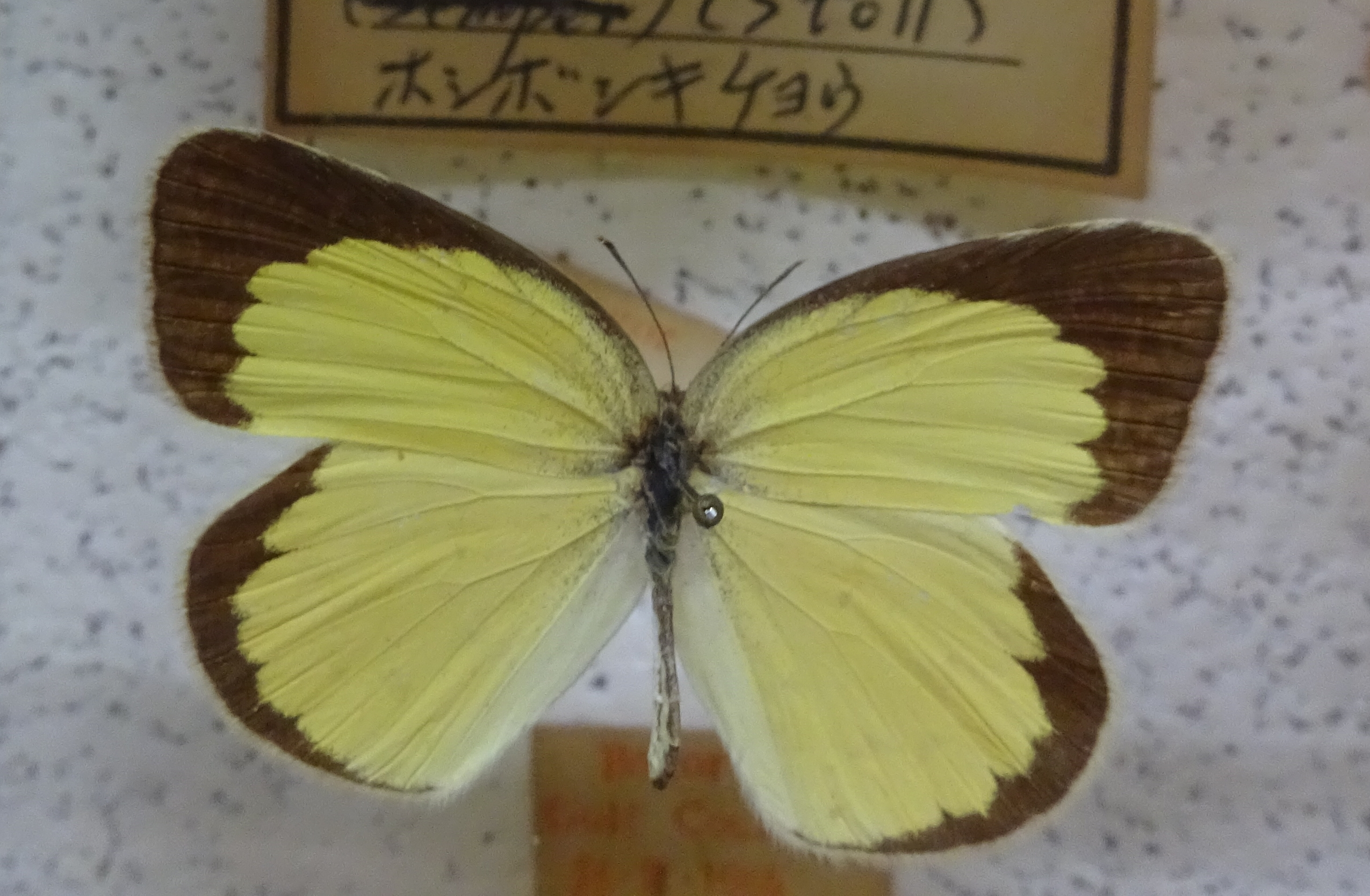
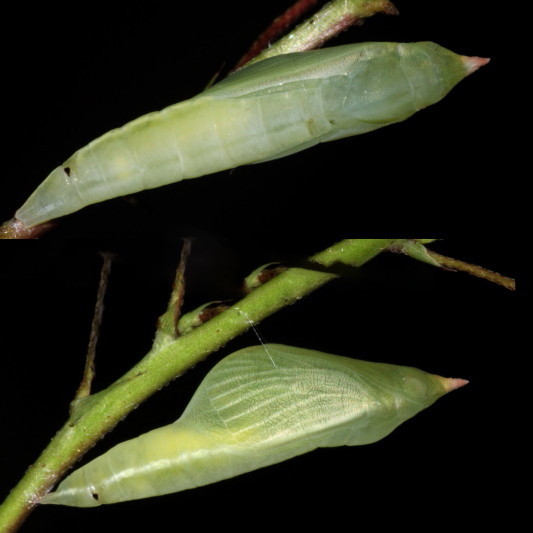
Upper side of male imago (above), showing the dark borders, and the pupa (below)

Eurema drona, the small grass yellow or no-brand grass-yellow, is a small butterfly of the family Pieridae. It is found in Oriental and Australian realms.

== Taxonomic revision ==
In 2022, the species Eurema brigitta was split through phylogeographic pattern of by comparing Afrotropical, Malagasy and Oriental-Australian populations using the mitochondrial cytochromec oxidase subunit I marker. After the taxonomic revision, Afrotropical and Oriental-Australian populations were separated by the Indian Ocean and dry habitats on the northern coasts. Therefore now the Oriental-Australian populations into a separate species, Eurema drona.

== Description ==
Ground colour of wings are fringe salmon pink. The valva is longer than that of E. brigitta.

== Synonyms ==
- Terias drona Horsfield, 1829
- Terias lerna C. & R. Felder, 1860
- Terias senna C. & R. Felder, 1865
- Terias zoraide C. & R. Felder, 1865
- Terias australis Wallace, 1867
- Terias rubella Wallace, 1867
- Terias hainana Moore, 1878
- Kibreeta fruhslorferi Moore, 1906
- Nirmula sikkima Moore, 1906
- Terias libythea drona Horsfield; Fruhstorfer, 1910
- Terias libythea drona f. herlina Fruhstorfer, 1910
- Terias libythea f. rubella Fruhstorfer, 1910
- Terias laeta hainana Moore; Fruhstorfer, 1910
- Terias libythea fruhstorferi Moore; Fruhstorfer, 1910
- Terias libythea senna C. & R. Felder; Fruhstorfer, 1910
- Terias libythea zoraide C. & R. Felder; Fruhstorfer, 1910
- Eurema libythea f. formosana Matsumura, 1919
- Eurema dorothea Nakahara, 1922Terias dionysia Hulstaert, 1923
- Eurema libythea dionysia (Hulstaert); Corbet & Pendlebury,1932
- Eurema libythea drona (Horsfield); Corbet & Pendlebury,1932
- Eurema libythea fruhstorferi (Moore); Corbet & Pendlebury,1932
- Eurema libythea hainana (Moore); Corbet & Pendlebury,1932
- Eurema libythea lerna (C. & R. Felder); Corbet & Pendlebury,1932
- Eurema libythea senna (C. & R. Felder); Corbet & Pendlebury,1932
- Eurema libythea zoraide (C. & R. Felder); Corbet &Pendlebury, 1932
- Terias hecabe angusta Kishida, 1933
- Terias hecabe nebulosa Kishida, 1933
- Eurema brigitta drona (Horsfield); Roepke, 1935
- Terias brigitta drona Horsfield; Talbot, 1939
- Terias brigitta rubella Wallace; Talbot, 1939
- Terias brigitta hainana Moore; Talbot, 1939
- Terias brigitta fruhstorferi Moore; Talbot, 1939
- Terias brigitta lerna C. & R. Felder; Talbot, 1939
- Terias brigitta senna C. & R. Felder; Talbot, 1939
- Terias brigitta zoraide C. & R. Felder; Talbot, 1939
- Maiva yunnana, Mell, 1943
- Eurema brigitta formosana Matsumura; Shirôzu, 1953
- Eurema brigitta rubella (Wallace); Shirôzu, 1955
- Eurema brigitta ina Eliot, 1956
- Eurema brigitta senna (C. & R. Felder); Corbet & Pendlebury,1956
- Eurema brigitta dionysia (Hulstaert); Shirôzu, 1960
- Eurema brigitta hinana (Moore); Shirôzu, 1960
- Eurema brigitta fruhstorferi (Moore); Shirôzu, 1960
- Eurema brigitta lerna (C. & R. Felder); Shirôzu, 1960
- Eurema brigitta zoraide (C. & R. Felder); Shirôzu, 1960
- Eurema brigitta australis (Wallace); Common & Waterhouse,1972
- Eurema hecabe angusta (Kishida); Yata, 1981
- Eurema brigitta papuana Shirôzu & Yata, 1981
- Eurema brigitta sincera Shirôzu & Yata, 1982

== Food plants ==
The larvae feed on Hypericum aethiopicum and Chamaecrista mimosoides.

== Subspecies ==
- E. d. pulchella (Boisduval, 1833) – Madagascar, Mauritius, Comoro Islands, Aldabra Islands
- E. d. drona (Horsfield, [1829]) – Sumatra, Java to Lombok
- E. d. senna (C.&R.Felder, [1865]) – Peninsular Malaya, Singapore, Indochina
- E. d. fruhstorferi (Moore, 1906) – eastern Indo-China
- E. d. ina Eliot, 1956 – southern Sulawesi
- E. d. hainana (Moore, 1878) – Hainan
- E. d. rubella (Wallace, 1867) – Sri Lanka, India, Burma to southern China, Nicobars
- E. d. formosana Matsumura, 1919 – Taiwan
- E. d. yunnana (Mell)
- E. d. australis (Wallace, 1867) – Australia, New Guinea, Papua New Guinea

== Gallery ==
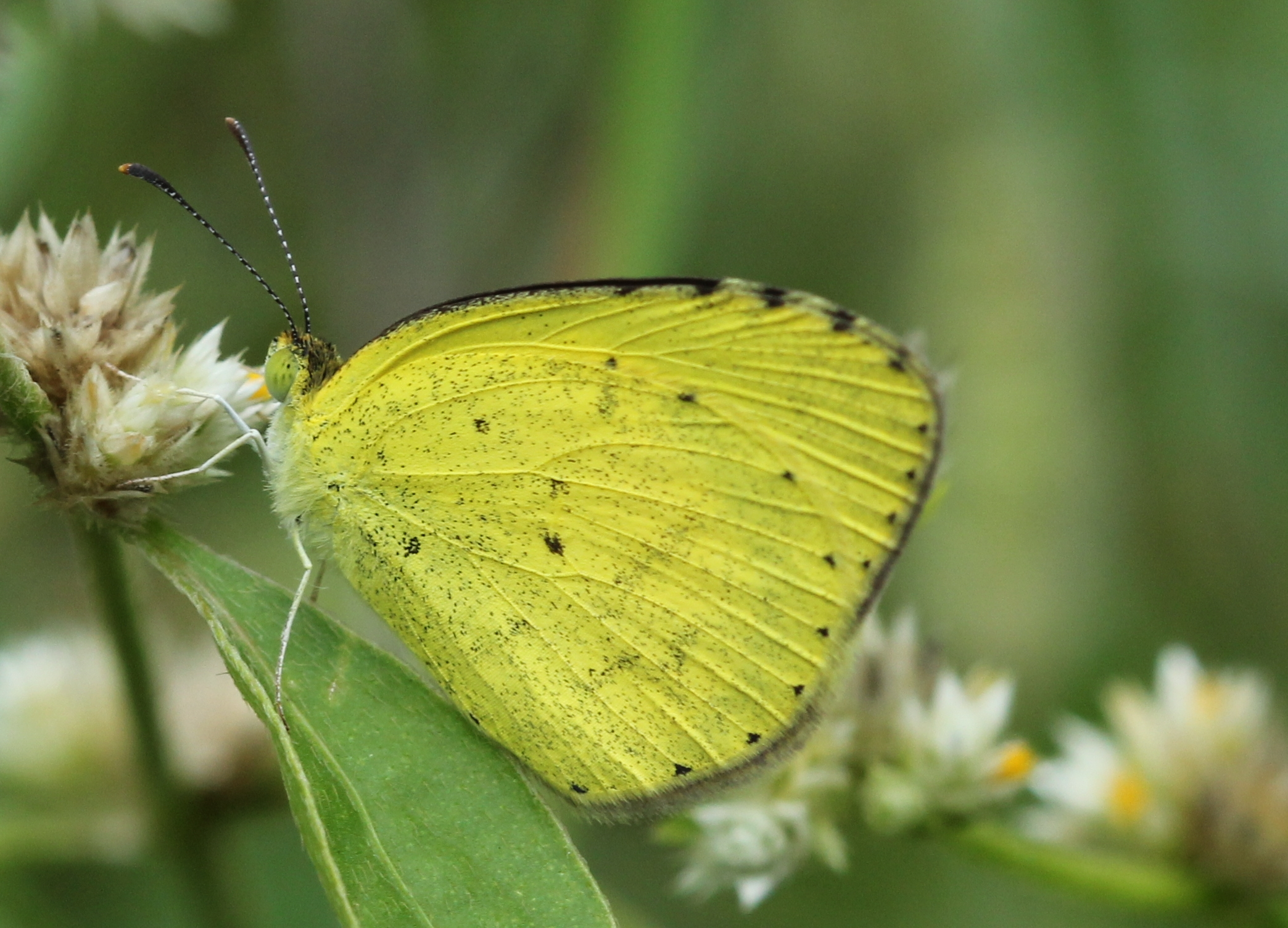
E. b. rubella, Bangalore, India
