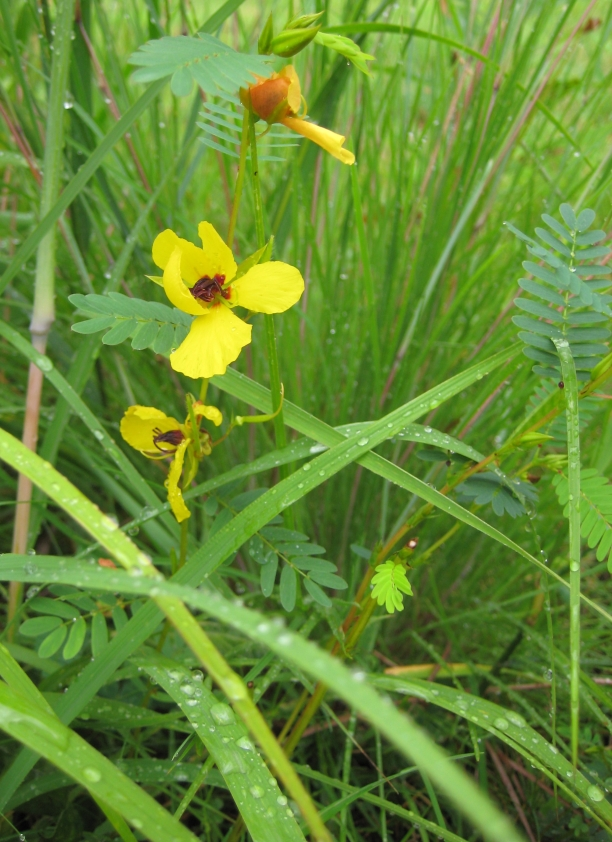

Conservation status
- Secure (NatureServe)

Scientific classification
- Kingdom: Plantae
- Clade: Tracheophytes
- Clade: Angiosperms
- Clade: Eudicots
- Clade: Rosids
- Order: Fabales
- Family: Fabaceae
- Subfamily: Caesalpinioideae
- Genus: Chamaecrista
- Species: C. fasciculata

Binomial name
- Chamaecrista fasciculata (Michx.) Greene

Synonyms
- Cassia fasciculata Michx.; Cassia chamaecrista Irwin and Barneby, 1982

= Chamaecrista fasciculata =

Species of plant

Chamaecrista fasciculata, the partridge pea, (Note: Also showy or prairie partridge pea, to differentiate it from the sensitive partridge pea, C. nictitans. Other common names include sleeping plant, locust weed and golden cassia.) is a species of legume native to most of the eastern United States. It is an annual which grows to approximately 0.5 meters (1 ft 8 in) tall. It has bright yellow flowers from early summer until first frost, with flowers through the entire flowering season if rainfall is sufficient.

The flowers are hermaphroditic, although a fraction of plants, less than 5%, do not produce sufficient pollen to reproduce as males. This phenomenon has been studied in a variety of plants as a possible evolutionary step towards dioecy, in which male and female flowers occur on separate plants. C. fasciculata is pollinated only by bees.

The flowers have yellow anthers that produce reproductive pollen, and purple anthers that produce food pollen, but no nectar. Long-tongued bees such as bumblebees, honey bees, long-horned bees, and leafcutting bees pollinate the flowers. There are extrafloral nectaries on the leaf stems, which attract a different set of insects: sweat bees, flies, wasps, and ants.

It thrives in areas that have been burned recently before declining in number in the following years. It is a pioneer species, growing densely in depleted sites that cannot support other plants. It is considered an excellent choice for planting in disturbed areas, as it will quickly cover an area, preventing erosion, while still allowing other plants to become established. It is also grown as an ornamental or for honey production.

== Description ==
The leaves consist of 10 to 15 pairs of small, narrow leaflets that are somewhat delicate to the touch. Like other legumes, the plant displays nyctinasty, which is a circadian rhythmic nastic movement wherein the leaves open and close in response to day and night cycles. The showy yellow flowers, about 1 inch (25 mm) across, grow 2 to 4 together in clusters on the stem. Flowers normally bloom July-September. The fruit is a straight, narrow pod 1.5 to 2.5 inches (38 to 64 mm) long, which splits along 2 sutures as it dries; the pod sides spiral to expel the seeds some distance from the parent plant.

== Distribution ==
The partridge pea is found in the eastern United States, excluding Vermont, Maine, and New Hampshire, west to New Mexico, South Dakota, and Minnesota.

== Ecology ==
Like other legumes, the partridge pea is a nitrogen-fixing plant, with microorganisms helping to produce the nitrogen compounds necessary for the plant to survive. The microorganisms inhabit root nodules, which provide them with a safe habitat while giving the plant access to the nutrients.

Chamaecrista fasciculata is insect pollinated and is recorded to have been visited in northern Florida by Augochloropsis metallica, Lasioglossum apopkense, Lasioglossum illinoense, Lasioglossum reticulatum, Lasioglossum weemsi/leviense, and Svastra atripes.

== Wildlife ==
The partridge pea has raised glands on its leaf petioles that excrete a nectar that attracts predatory ants, with the benefit of encouraging the ants to prey on herbivorous insects.

The seed is one of the major food items of northern bobwhite and other quail species because it remains in sound condition throughout the winter and early spring. Partridge pea was found to be one of the most important fall and winter foods of bobwhite quail in Alabama. Partridge pea seeds are high in phosphorus content and protein value, and low in crude fiber and lignin making digestibility generally high. Seeds of this legume are also eaten by the greater and lesser prairie-chicken, ring-necked pheasant, mallard, grassland birds, and field mice. Partridge pea often grows in dense stands, producing litter and plant stalks that furnish cover for upland game birds, small mammals, small non-game birds, and waterfowl. Partridge pea is considered an important honey plant, often occurring where few other honey plants are found. Nectar is not available in the flowers of showy partridge pea but is produced by small orange glands at the base of each leaf. Ants often seek the nectar and are frequent visitors. The common sulfur butterfly lays its eggs on the leaves, and the larvae use the leaves as a food source.

== Uses ==
Historically, the Cherokee tribe used partridge pea as a medicinal remedy for spells of fainting and to prevent fatigue in ball players. The Seminole tribe used it to alleviate nausea and also utilized the plant as a bed for ripening persimmons.

Partridge pea can be planted along roadways or streambanks to control erosion and improve soil fertility, as it establishes rapidly, fixes nitrogen, reseeds, and then decreases in frequency once other species establish.
