= Sarmal =

Sarmal may refer to:

- Sarmal, Iran, a village in Bushehr Province, Iran
- Sarmal, Thane district, a village in Shahapur taluka, Thane district, Maharashtra State, India
- Sarmal (film), a 2019 short Turkish language drama film
- Sarmal, the Indian name for the plant Chamaecrista pumila
