= Aristotelia corallina =

Scientific classification
- Kingdom: Animalia
- Phylum: Arthropoda
- Clade: Pancrustacea
- Class: Insecta
- Order: Lepidoptera
- Family: Gelechiidae
- Genus: Aristotelia
- Species: A. corallina

Binomial name
- Aristotelia corallina Walsingham, 1909

Species of moth

Aristotelia corallina is a moth of the family Gelechiidae. It was described by Thomas de Grey, 6th Baron Walsingham, in 1909. It is found in Mexico (Guerrero) and the United States, where it has been recorded from Alabama, Arizona, Florida, Indiana, Louisiana, Mississippi, Oklahoma, Tennessee and Texas, as well as in Puerto Rico.

The wingspan is about 12 mm. The forewings are blackish, the dorsum rich rosy reddish, this colour diffused upward along the termen and over the terminal cilia through which runs a somewhat obscurely reduplicated dark shade-line. The hindwings are dark grey. Adults are on wing year round in Mexico.

The larvae feed on Acacia cornigera, Acacia farnesiana and Chamaecrista nictitans.
