= Chamaecrista aldabrensis =

Conservation status
- Vulnerable (IUCN 2.3)

Scientific classification
- Kingdom: Plantae
- Clade: Tracheophytes
- Clade: Angiosperms
- Clade: Eudicots
- Clade: Rosids
- Order: Fabales
- Family: Fabaceae
- Subfamily: Caesalpinioideae
- Genus: Chamaecrista
- Species: C. aldabrensis

Binomial name
- Chamaecrista aldabrensis (Hemsl.) Lock & H.E.Ireland (1993)

Synonyms
- Cassia aldabrensis Hemsl. (1916)

Species of legume

Chamaecrista aldabrensis is a species of flowering plant in the family Fabaceae. It is a subshrub endemic to Aldabra and Assumption near the Seychelles. It is threatened by habitat destruction.
