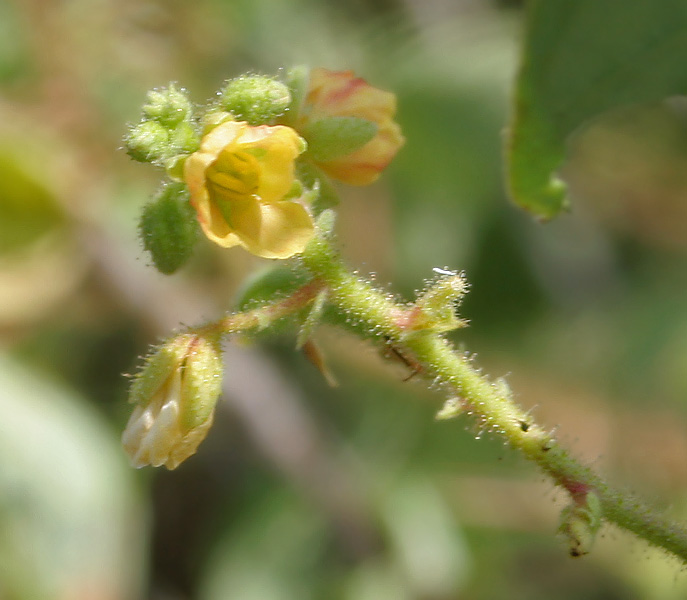
- Close-up of flowers
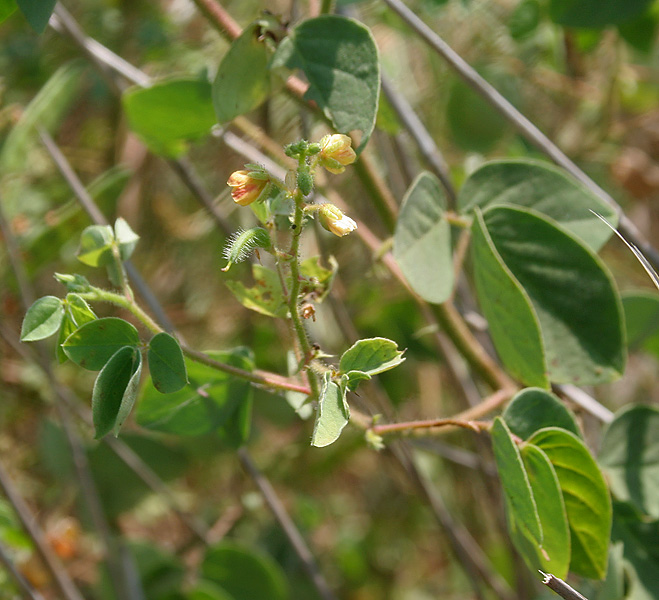
- Leaves and flowers

Scientific classification
- Kingdom: Plantae
- Clade: Tracheophytes
- Clade: Angiosperms
- Clade: Eudicots
- Clade: Rosids
- Order: Fabales
- Family: Fabaceae
- Subfamily: Caesalpinioideae
- Genus: Chamaecrista
- Species: C. absus

Binomial name
- Chamaecrista absus (L.) H.S.Irwin & Barneby

Synonyms
- List: Cassia absus L.; Cassia absus var. meonandra H.S.Irwin & Barneby; Cassia acacalis Royle; Cassia babylonica Schrank; Cassia coccinea Wall.; Cassia exigua (Roxb.) Steud.; Cassia thonningii DC.; Cassia viscida Zoll. & Moritzi; Cassia viscosa Schumach. & Thonn.; Grimaldia absus (L.) Link; Grimaldia opifera Schrank; Senna absus (L.) Roxb.; Senna exigua Roxb.

= Chamaecrista absus =

Species of flowering plant

Chamaecrista absus (syn. Cassia absus), the pig's senna or tropical sensitive pea, is a species of flowering plant in the family Fabaceae, with a worldwide distribution in the tropics and subtropics. An annual herb reaching 60 cm (24 in), it is a common weed of cultivated and waste places, and its seeds are regularly harvested and sold for use in traditional medicine in Africa and Asia.

== Subtaxa ==
The following varieties are accepted:

- Chamaecrista absus var. absus – entire range
- Chamaecrista absus var. meonandra (H.S.Irwin & Barneby) H.S.Irwin & Barneby - Arizona, Mexico, Honduras
