= Chamaecrista bucherae =

Conservation status
- Vulnerable (IUCN 2.3)

Scientific classification
- Kingdom: Plantae
- Clade: Tracheophytes
- Clade: Angiosperms
- Clade: Eudicots
- Clade: Rosids
- Order: Fabales
- Family: Fabaceae
- Subfamily: Caesalpinioideae
- Genus: Chamaecrista
- Species: C. bucherae

Binomial name
- Chamaecrista bucherae (Mold.) Irwin & Barneby

Species of legume

Chamaecrista bucherae is a species of flowering plant in the plant family Fabaceae. This shrub rarely attains the size of a small tree. It is confined to coastal lowland. It is in danger of extinction because of degrading land. It is found only in Cuba.
