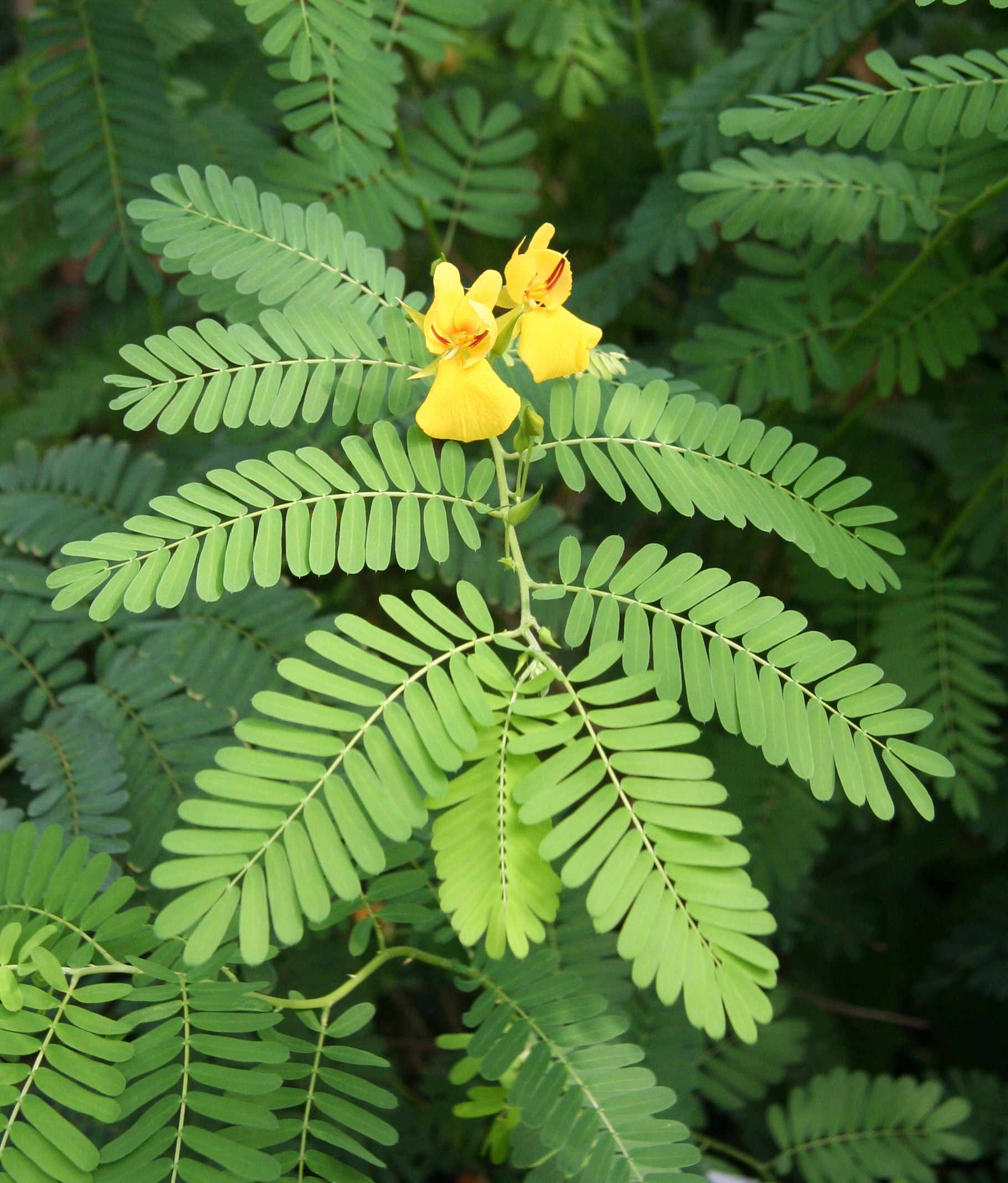
- Chamaecrista glandulosa var. swartzii

Conservation status
- Least Concern (IUCN 3.1)

Scientific classification
- Kingdom: Plantae
- Clade: Tracheophytes
- Clade: Angiosperms
- Clade: Eudicots
- Clade: Rosids
- Order: Fabales
- Family: Fabaceae
- Subfamily: Caesalpinioideae
- Genus: Chamaecrista
- Species: C. glandulosa

Binomial name
- Chamaecrista glandulosa (L.) Greene

= Chamaecrista glandulosa =

Species of legume

Chamaecrista glandulosa is a species of flowering plant in the legume family native to the Americas. Its distribution extends from Mexico to Brazil and it occurs on many Caribbean islands.

There are many varieties of this plant:

- Chamaecrista glandulosa var. andicola (South America)
- Chamaecrista glandulosa var. andreana (Colombia)
- Chamaecrista glandulosa var. balasana (Peru)
- Chamaecrista glandulosa var. brasiliensis (Brazil)
- Chamaecrista glandulosa var. crystallina (Venezuela, Colombia)
- Chamaecrista glandulosa var. flavicoma (Mexico, Guatemala, South America)
- Chamaecrista glandulosa var. glandulosa (Jamaica)
- Chamaecrista glandulosa var. mirabilis - an endangered Puerto Rico endemic formerly called Cassia mirabilis
- Chamaecrista glandulosa var. parralensis (Mexico)
- Chamaecrista glandulosa var. picardae (Hispaniola)
- Chamaecrista glandulosa var. rapidarum (Venezuela, Colombia)
- Chamaecrista glandulosa var. swartzii (Caribbean)
- Chamaecrista glandulosa var. tristicula (Colombia)
