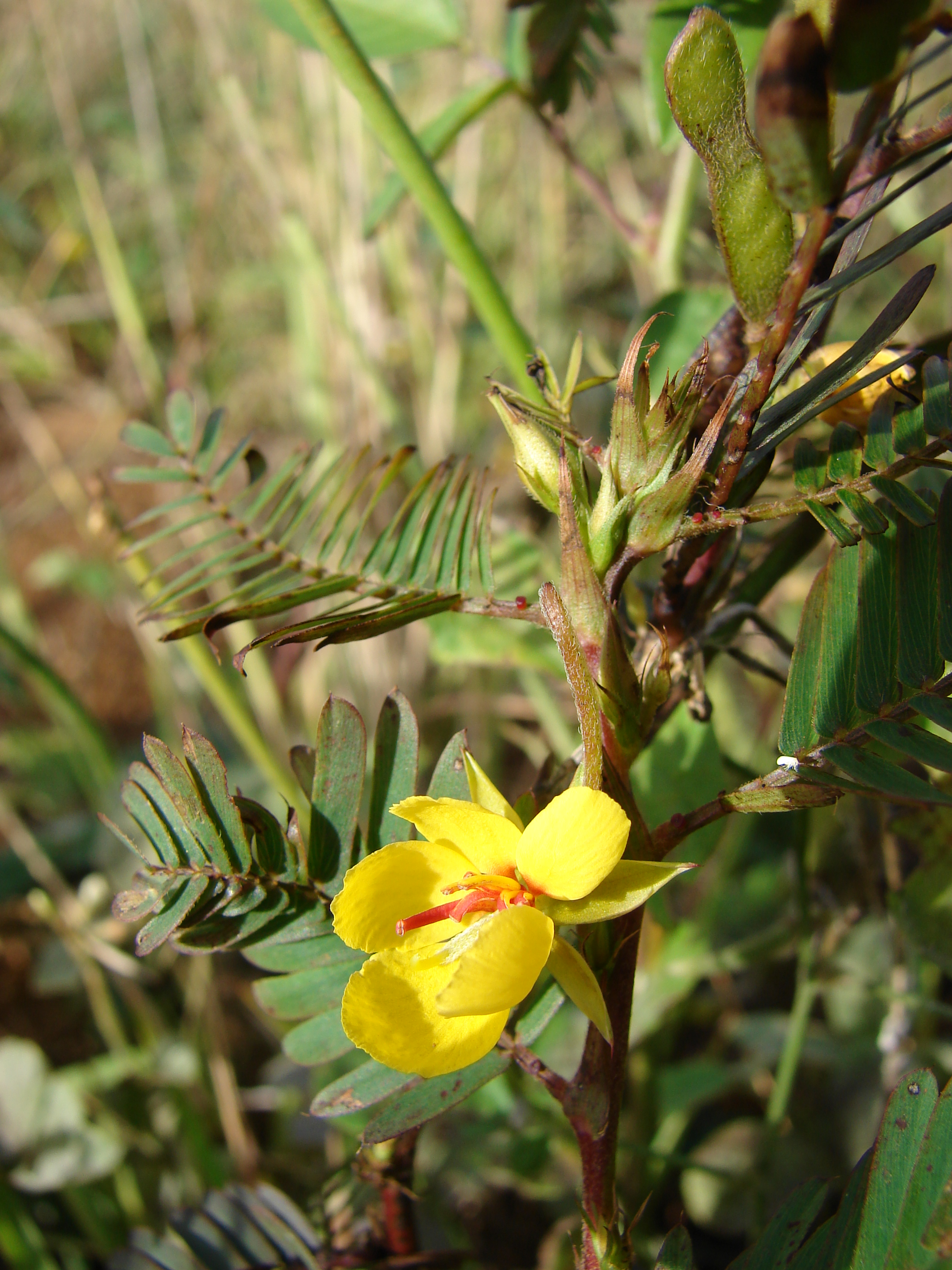
- Chamaecrista nictitans on Kahoolawe, Hawaii

Conservation status
- Least Concern (IUCN 3.1)

Scientific classification
- Kingdom: Plantae
- Clade: Tracheophytes
- Clade: Angiosperms
- Clade: Eudicots
- Clade: Rosids
- Order: Fabales
- Family: Fabaceae
- Subfamily: Caesalpinioideae
- Genus: Chamaecrista
- Species: C. nictitans

Binomial name
- Chamaecrista nictitans (L.) Moench

Synonyms
- Cassia nictitans L. Chamaecrista procumbens

= Chamaecrista nictitans =

Species of legume

Chamaecrista nictitans, the sensitive cassia, sensitive partridge pea, small partridge pea or wild sensitive plant, is a herbaceous species of legume widely distributed through the temperate and tropical Americas. It is an annual plant capable of rapid plant movement—its leaflets fold together when touched. However, a population at Haleakala National Park on the island of Maui, Hawaii, was reported as not being sensitive to touch.

== Description ==
Chamaecrista nictitans is an annual, low-growing herb that grows from a taproot and often spreads to form extensive mats. Its stems range from glabrous to densely covered with incurved trichomes. The plant features sensitive leaves with a slender stalk and an umbrella-shaped gland measuring approximately 0.4 to 0.8 mm in diameter. Persistent striate are located just below the leaves. The flowers appear in the axils either singly or in groups of two to three, arranged in short racemes. Pedicels are 1 to 4 mm long. The sepals are lanceolate-acuminate, measuring 3 to 4 mm in length. The petals are bright yellow and unequal in size, with the lowermost and largest petal being 6 to 8 mm long—roughly twice the size of the other four. The plant bears five stamens of unequal length. Its fruit is a legume that opens elastically when mature, ranging from 2 to 4 cm long and 3 to 6 mm wide. The surface of the legume varies from smooth to densely hairy, and in rare cases, it may appear shaggy.

C. nictitans is similar in appearance to Chamaecrista fasciculata except that the leaves are generally smaller, it is less robust, and the flowers are smaller and inconspicuous.

== Distribution and habitat ==
C. nictitans is widely distributed throughout the temperate and tropical Americas. It has also been introduced to Hawaii and subtropics and tropics in Asia.

It can grow in a variety of natural and disturbed communities due to its high tolerance to a range of growing conditions. It is tolerant of overstory canopies and their subsequent decrease of available light.

== Uses ==
Historically, the Cherokee tribe used C. nictitans along with Senna marilandica to treat spasm in infants. It also was used as a cathartic and a vermifuge.

Chamaecrista nictitans is undesirable as a forage or hay but can be used for both in subtropical areas.
