= Phyllanthus kaweesakii =

Scientific classification
- Kingdom: Plantae
- Clade: Tracheophytes
- Clade: Angiosperms
- Clade: Eudicots
- Clade: Rosids
- Order: Malpighiales
- Family: Phyllanthaceae
- Genus: Phyllanthus
- Species: P. kaweesakii

Binomial name
- Phyllanthus kaweesakii Pornp., Chantar. & J.Parn.

Species of flowering plant

Phyllanthus kaweesakii is a species of shrub native to northeastern Thailand described in 2017.
