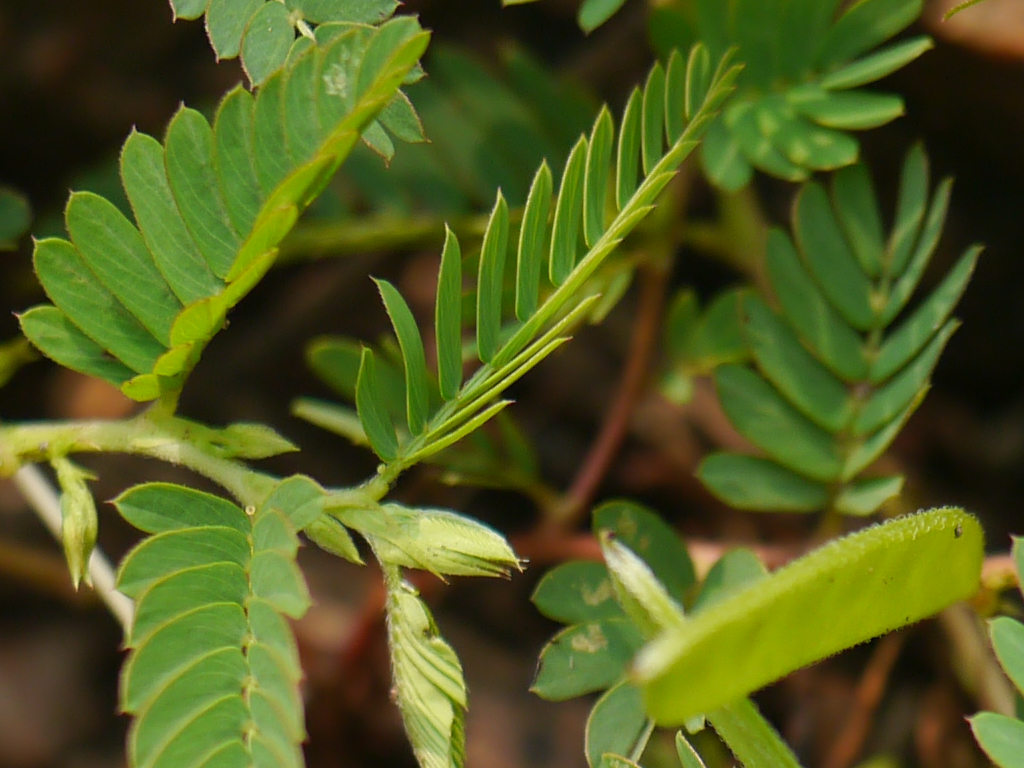
- Close-up of leaves
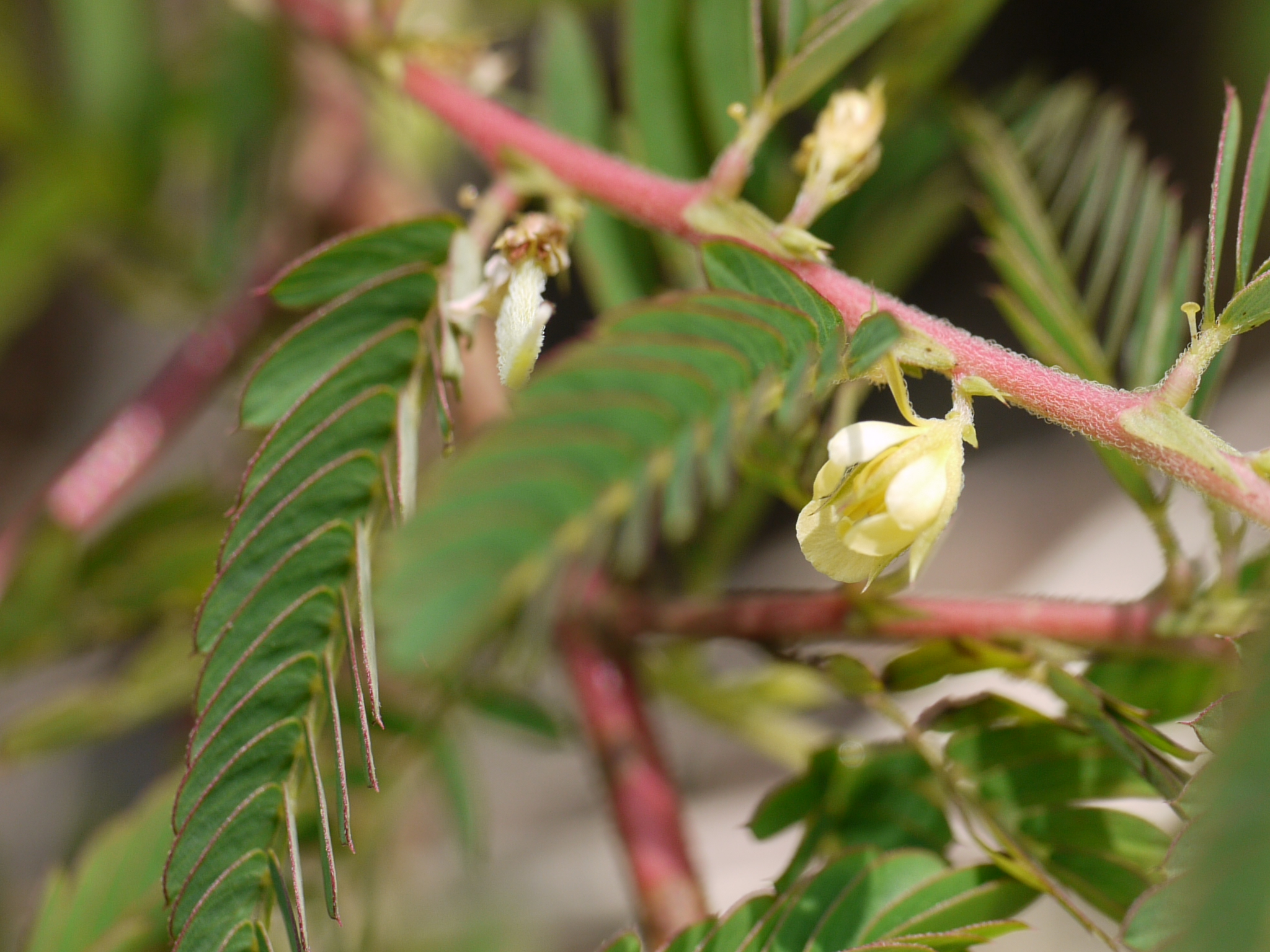
- Leaves and flowers

Scientific classification
- Kingdom: Plantae
- Clade: Tracheophytes
- Clade: Angiosperms
- Clade: Eudicots
- Clade: Rosids
- Order: Fabales
- Family: Fabaceae
- Subfamily: Caesalpinioideae
- Genus: Chamaecrista
- Species: C. pumila

Binomial name
- Chamaecrista pumila V. Singh

Synonyms
- List: Cassia prostrata (J.Koenig ex Roxb. ); Cassia pumila (Roxb.); Senna prostrata (Roxb.)

= Chamaecrista pumila =

Species of plant in the family Fabaceae

Chamaecrista pumila is a species of flowering plant in the family Fabaceae. It is native to China and Tropical Asia. It grows up to 25–75 cm (9.8–29.5 in) tall.
