= Nyctinasty =

Movements of higher plants in response to the onset of darkness

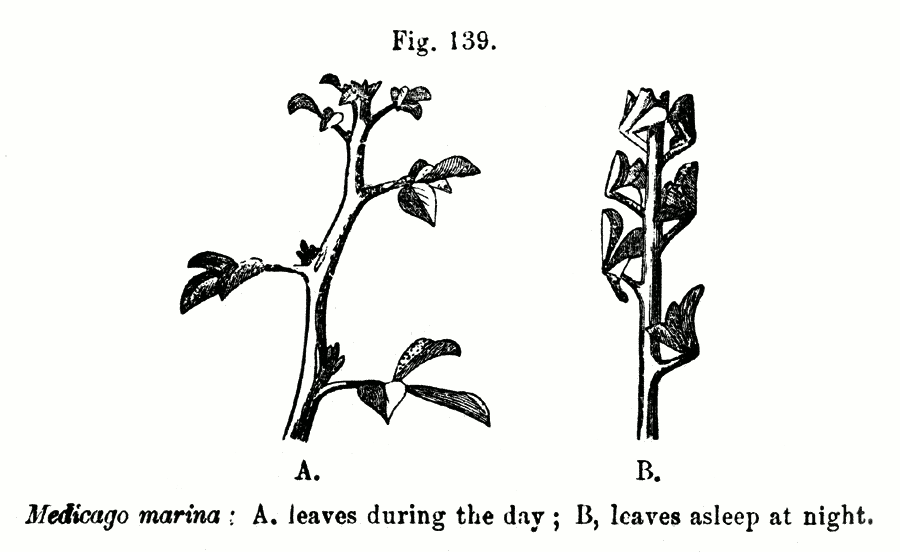
Illustration of sleep movements in Medicago leaves, from Charles Darwin's The Power of Movement in Plants (1880)

In plant biology, nyctinasty is the circadian rhythm-based nastic movement of higher plants in response to the onset of darkness, or a plant "sleeping". Nyctinastic movements are associated with diurnal light and temperature changes and controlled by the circadian clock. It has been argued that for plants that display foliar nyctinasty, it is a crucial mechanism for survival; however, most plants do not exhibit any nyctinastic movements. Nyctinasty is found in a range of plant species and across xeric, mesic, and aquatic environments, suggesting that this singular behavior may serve a variety of evolutionary benefits. Examples are the closing of the petals of a flower at dusk and the sleep movements of the leaves of many legumes.

== Physiology ==
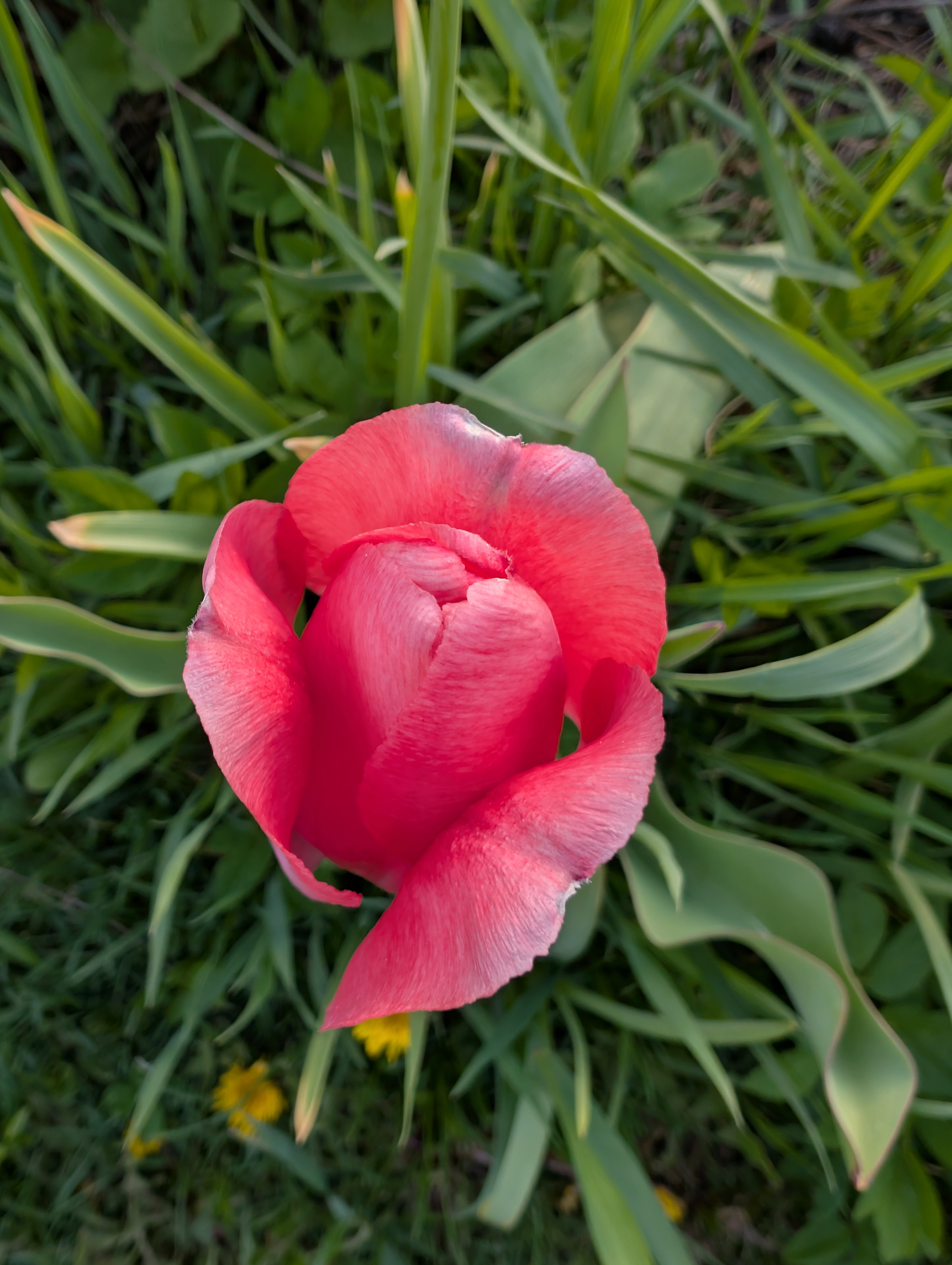
A tulip with closed petals

Plants use phytochrome to detect red and far red light. Depending on which kind of light is absorbed, the protein can switch between a Pr state that absorbs red light and a Pfr state that absorbs far red light. Red light converts Pr to Pfr and far red light converts Pfr to Pr. Many plants use phytochrome to establish circadian cycles which influence the opening and closing of leaves associated with nyctastic movements. Anatomically, the movements are mediated by pulvini. Pulvinus cells are located at the base or apex of the petiole and the flux of water from the dorsal to ventral motor cells regulates leaf closure. This flux is in response to movement of potassium ions between pulvinus and surrounding tissue. Movement of potassium ions is connected to the concentration of Pfr or Pr. In Albizia julibrissin, longer darker periods, leading to low Pfr, result in a faster leaf opening. In the SLEEPLESS mutation of Lotus japonicus, the pulvini are changed into petiole-like structures, rendering the plant incapable of closing its leaflets at night. Non-pulvinar mediated movement is also possible and happens through differential cell division and growth on either side of the petiole, resulting in a bending motion within the leaves to the desired position.

Leaf movement is also controlled by bioactive substances known as leaf opening or leaf closing factors. Several leaf-opening and leaf-closing factors have been characterized biochemically. These factors differ among plants. Leaf closure and opening is mediated by the relative concentrations of leaf opening and closing factors in a plant. Either the leaf opening or closing factor is a glycoside, which is inactivated by hydrolysis of the glycosidic bond via beta glucosidase. In Lespedeza cuneata the leaf opening factor, potassium lespedezate, is hydrolyzed to 4 hydroxy phenyl pyruvic acid. In Phyllanthus urinaria, leaf closing factor Phyllanthurinolactone is hydrolyzed to its aglycon during the day. Beta glucosidase activity is regulated via circadian rhythms.

Fluorescence studies have shown that the binding sites of leaf opening and closing factors are located on the surface of the motor cell. Shrinking and expansion of the motor cell in response to this chemical signal allows for leaf opening and closure. The binding of leaf opening and closing factors is specific to related plants. The leaf movement factor of Chamaecrista mimosoides (formerly Cassia mimosoides) was found to not bind to the motor cell of Albizia julibrissin. The leaf movement factor of Albizia julibrissin similarly didn't bind to the motor cell of Chamaecrista mimosoides, but did bind to Albizia saman and Albizia lebbeck.

== Function ==
The functions of nyctinastic movement have yet to be conclusively identified, although several have been proposed. Minorsky hypothesized that nyctinastic behaviors are adaptive due to the plant being able to reduce its surface area during night time, which can lead to better temperature retention and also reduces night-time herbivory. Minorsky specifically suggests a Tritrophic Hypothesis in which he considers the predators of herbivores in addition to the plants and herbivores themselves. By moving leaves up or down, herbivores become more visible to nocturnal predators in both a spatial and olfactory sense, increasing herbivore predation and subsequently decreasing damage to a plant's leaves. Studies using mutant plants with a loss of function gene that results in petiole growth instead of pulvini found that these plants have less biomass and smaller leaf area than the wild type. This indicates nyctinastic movement may be beneficial toward plant growth.

Charles Darwin believed that nyctinasty exists to reduce the risk of plants freezing.

Nyctinasty may occur to protect the pollen, keeping pollen dry and intact during the nighttime when most pollinating insects are inactive. Conversely, some flowers that are pollinated by moths or bats exhibit nyctinastic flower opening at night.

== History ==
The earliest recorded observation of this behavior in plants dates back to 324 BC when Androsthenes of Thasos, a companion to Alexander the Great, noted the opening and closing of tamarind tree leaves from day to night. Carl Linnaeus (1729) proposed that this was the plants sleeping, but this idea has been widely contested.
