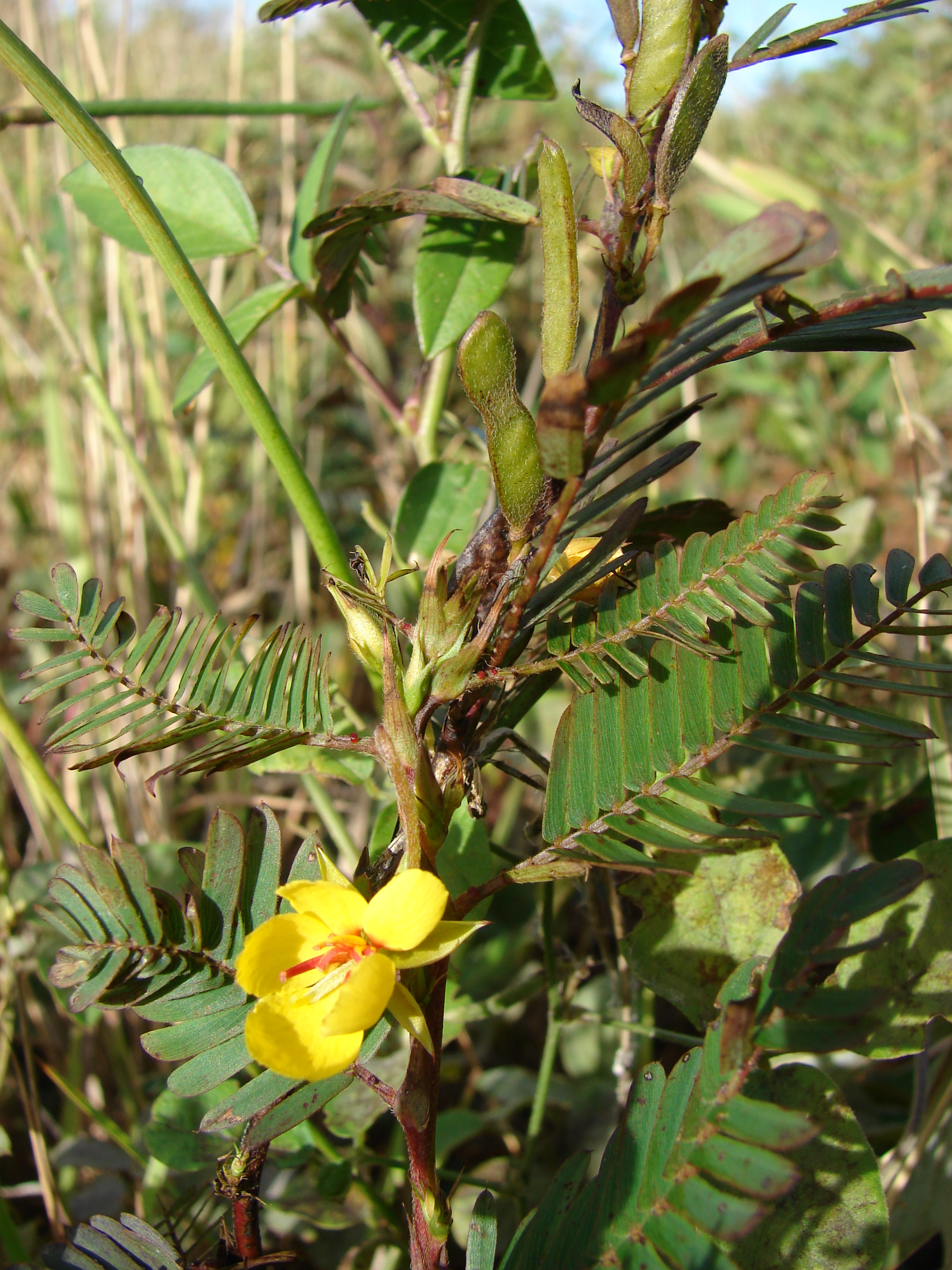
- Chamaecrista nictitans

Scientific classification
- Kingdom: Plantae
- Clade: Tracheophytes
- Clade: Angiosperms
- Clade: Eudicots
- Clade: Rosids
- Order: Fabales
- Family: Fabaceae
- Subfamily: Caesalpinioideae
- Tribe: Cassieae
- Subtribe: Cassiinae
- Genus: Chamaecrista (L.) Moench (1794)

Sections, series, and species
- 367 species; see text

Synonyms
- Cassia Vogel ex Benth. (1870); Cassia (DC. ex Collad.) Symon (1966); Cassia sect. Lasiorhegma Vogel (1837); Cassia subgen. Lasiorhegma Vogel ex Benth. (1870); Cassia subgen. Lasiorhegma sensu Irwin & Bameby (1977); Cassia subgen. Absus (DC.) Symon (1966); Chamaecrista sensu Greene (1897); Chamaecrista sensu Britton (1930); Chamaecrista sensu Britton & Killip (1936); Chamaecrista sensu Pittier (1945); Chamaecrista sensu ampliat. Irwin & Barneby (1976); Chamaecrista sensu ampliat. Irwin & Barneby (1981); Dialanthera Raf. (1838); Disterepta Raf. (1838); Grimaldia Schrank (1805); Hepteireca Raf. (1838); Nictitella Raf. (1838); Ophiocaulon Raf. (1838); Sooja Siebold (1830), nom. nud.; Xamacrista Raf. (1838)

= Chamaecrista =

Genus of legumes

Chamaecrista is a genus of flowering plants in the pea family, Fabaceae, subfamily Caesalpinioideae. Members of the genus are commonly known as sensitive pea. Several species are capable of rapid plant movement. Unlike the related genera Cassia and Senna, members of Chamaecrista form root nodules.

Chamaecrista has 367 species, with a wide distribution – the Americas from Minnesota to northern Argentina, sub-Saharan Africa, the Arabian Peninsula and Iran, the Indian Subcontinent, Indochina, China, Korea, Japan, Malesia, New Guinea, and Australia.

== Species ==
Chamaecrista comprises the following species, organized into sections, subsections, and series:

=== Section Apoucouita Benth. ===
Series Apoucouita

- Chamaecrista aiarana (H.S.Irwin) H.S.Irwin & Barneby
- Chamaecrista apoucouita (Aubl.) H.S.Irwin & Barneby
- Chamaecrista aspidiifolia H.S.Irwin & Barneby
- Chamaecrista bahiae (H.S.Irwin) H.S.Irwin & Barneby
- Chamaecrista boyanii (H.S.Irwin & Barneby) H.S.Irwin
- Chamaecrista compitalis (H.S.Irwin & Barneby) H.S.Irwin
- Chamaecrista duartei (H.S.Irwin) H.S.Irwin & Barneby
- Chamaecrista eitenorum (H.S.Irwin & Barneby) H.S.Irwin
  - var. eitenorum (H.S.Irwin & Barneby) H.S.Irwin
  - var. regana (H.S.Irwin & Barneby) H.S.Irwin
- Chamaecrista ensiformis (Vell.) H.S.Irwin & Barneby
  - var. ensiformis (Vell.) H.S.Irwin & Barneby
  - var. maranonica (H.S.Irwin) H.S.Irwin & Barneby
  - var. plurifoliolata (Hoehne) H.S.Irwin & Barneby
- Chamaecrista hymenaeifolia (Benth.) H.S.Irwin & Barneby
- Chamaecrista negrensis (H.S.Irwin) H.S.Irwin & Barneby
  - var. albuquerquei (H.S.Irwin & Barneby) H.S.Irwin
  - var. negrensis (H.S.Irwin) H.S.Irwin & Barneby
- Chamaecrista onusta H.S.Irwin & Barneby
- Chamaecrista polystachya (Benth.) H.S.Irwin & Barneby
- Chamaecrista scleroxylon (Ducke) H.S.Irwin & Barneby
- Chamaecrista subpeltata (Rizzini) H.S.Irwin & Barneby
- Chamaecrista xinguensis (Ducke) H.S.Irwin & Barneby

Series Pteridophyllae

- Chamaecrista adiantifolia (Spruce ex Benth.) H. S. Irwin & Barneby
  - var. adiantifolia (Spruce ex Benth.) H. S. Irwin & Barneby
  - var. pteridophylla (Sandwith) H.S.Irwin & Barneby
- Chamaecrista aspleniifolia (H.S.Irwin & Barneby) H.S.Irwin

=== Section Absus DC. ex Colladon emend. Irwin & Barneby ===
Subsection Absus DC. ex Colladon

Series Absoideae

- Chamaecrista acosmifolia (Benth.) H.S.Irwin & Barneby
  - var. acosmifolia (Benth.) H.S.Irwin & Barneby
  - var. euryloba (H.S.Irwin & Barneby) H.S.Irwin
  - var. oropedii (H.S.Irwin & Barneby) H.S.Irwin
- Chamaecrista amiciella (H.S.Irwin & Barneby) H.S.Irwin
- Chamaecrista andersonii (H.S.Irwin & Barneby) H.S.Irwin
- Chamaecrista barbata (Nees & Mart.) H.S.Irwin & Barn
- Chamaecrista belemii (H.S.Irwin & Barneby) H.S.Irwin
  - var. belemii (H.S.Irwin & Barneby) H.S.Irwin
  - var. paludicola (H.S.Irwin & Barneby) H.S.Irwin
- Chamaecrista brevicalyx (Benth.) H.S.Irwin & Barneby
  - var. brevicalyx (Benth.) H.S.Irwin & Barneby
  - var. elliptica (H.S.Irwin & Barneby) H.S.Irwin
- Chamaecrista campestris H.S.Irwin & Barneby
- Chamaecrista carobinha (H.S.Irwin & Barneby) H.S.Irwin
- Chamaecrista chapadae (H.S.Irwin & Barneby) H.S.Irwin
- Chamaecrista egleri (H.S.Irwin & Barneby) H.S.Irwin
- Chamaecrista fagonioides (Vogel) H.S.Irwin & Barneby
  - var. fagonioides (Vogel) H.S.Irwin & Barneby
  - var. macrocalyx (H.S.Irwin & Barneby) H.S.Irwin
- Chamaecrista hispidula (Vahl) H.S.Irwin & Barneby
- Chamaecrista jacobinea (Benth.) H.S.Irwin & Barneby
- Chamaecrista juruenensis (Hoehne) H.S.Irwin & Barneby
- Chamaecrista longicuspis (Benth.) H.S.Irwin & Barneby
- Chamaecrista multiseta (Benth.) H.S.Irwin & Barneby
- Chamaecrista paraunana (H.S.Irwin & Barneby) H.S.Irwin
- Chamaecrista punctulata (Hook. & Arn.) H.S.Irwin & Barn
- Chamaecrista roncadorensis (H.S.Irwin & Barneby) H.S.Irwin
- Chamaecrista rugosula (Benth.) H.S.Irwin & Barneby
- Chamaecrista salvatoris (H.S.Irwin & Barneby) H.S.Irwin
- Chamaecrista souzana (H.S.Irwin & Barneby) H.S.Irwin
- Chamaecrista tetraphylla Britton & Rose
- Chamaecrista viscosa (Kunth) H.S.Irwin & Barneby
  - var. major (Benth.) H.S.Irwin & Barneby
  - var. paraguayensis (Chodat & Hassl.) H.S.Irwin & Barneby
  - var. viscosa (Kunth) H.S.Irwin & Barneby
- Chamaecrista zygophylloides (Taub.) H.S.Irwin & Barneby
  - var. caribaea (H.S.Irwin & Barneby) H.S.Irwin
  - var. colligans (H.S.Irwin & Barneby) H.S.Irwin
  - var. deamii (Britton & Rose) H.S.Irwin & Barneby
  - var. zygophylloides (Taub.) H.S.Irwin & Barneby

Series Adenophyllae

- Chamaecrista adenophylla (Taub.) H.S.Irwin & Barneby
- Chamaecrista chrysosepala (H.S.Irwin & Barneby) H.S.Irwin
- Chamaecrista hatschbachii H.S.Irwin & Barneby
- Chamaecrista itabiritoana (H.S.Irwin & Barneby) H.S.Irwin

Series Andromedeae

- Chamaecrista andromedea (Benth.) H.S.Irwin & Barneby

Series Atroglandulosae

- Chamaecrista atroglandulosa (Harms) H.S.Irwin & Barneby

Series Bracteolatae

- Chamaecrista bracteolata (Vogel) H.S.Irwin & Barneby
- Chamaecrista glaziovii (Harms) H.S.Irwin & Barneby
- Chamaecrista phyllostachya (Benth.) H.S.Irwin & Barneby

Series Catharticae

- Chamaecrista cathartica (Mart.) H.S.Irwin & Barneby
  - var. cathartica (Mart.) H.S.Irwin & Barneby
  - var. paucijuga (H.S.Irwin & Barneby) H.S.Irwin
- Chamaecrista catharticoides (H.S.Irwin & Barneby) H.S.Irwin
- Chamaecrista microsenna (H.S.Irwin & Barneby) H.S.Irwin

Series Confertae

- Chamaecrista caespitosa (Benth.) H.S.Irwin & Barneby
- Chamaecrista conferta (Benth.) H.S.Irwin & Barneby
  - var. conferta (Benth.) H.S.Irwin & Barneby
  - var. machrisiana (Cowan) H.S.Irwin & Barneby
  - var. simulans (H.S.Irwin & Barneby) H.S.Irwin
  - var. virgata (H.S.Irwin & Barneby) H.S.Irwin
- Chamaecrista crommyotricha (Harms) H.S.Irwin & Barneby

Series Ericifoliae

- Chamaecrista ericifolia (Benth.) H.S.Irwin & Barneby

Series Geminatae

- Chamaecrista didyma H.S.Irwin & Barneby
- Chamaecrista geminata (Benth.) H.S.Irwin & Barneby

Series Glutinosae

- Chamaecrista caracensis (H.S.Irwin & Barneby) H.S.Irwin
- Chamaecrista catiarae (H.S.Irwin & Barneby) H.S.Irwin
- Chamaecrista dentata (Vogel) H.S.Irwin & Barneby
- Chamaecrista echinocarpa (Benth.) H.S.Irwin & Barneby
- Chamaecrista fragilis (H.S.Irwin & Barneby) H.S.Irwin
- Chamaecrista kirkbridei (H.S.Irwin & Barneby) H.S.Irwin
- Chamaecrista lentiscifolia (Benth.) H.S.Irwin & Barneby
- Chamaecrista myrophenges (H.S.Irwin & Barneby) H.S.Irwin
- Chamaecrista punctulifera (Harms) H.S.Irwin & Barneby
- Chamaecrista semaphora (H.S.Irwin & Barneby) H.S.Irwin
- Chamaecrista stillifera (H.S.Irwin & Barneby) H.S.Irwin

Series Gracillimae

- Chamaecrista benthamii (Ghesq.) H.S.Irwin & Barneby

Series Hassleranae

- Chamaecrista hassleri (H.S.Irwin & Barneby) H.S.Irwin

Series Hedysaroides

- Chamaecrista hedysaroides (Vogel) H.S.Irwin & Barneby

Series Incanae

- Chamaecrista incana (Vogel) H.S.Irwin & Barneby

Series Incurvatae

- Chamaecrista incurvata (Benth.) H.S.Irwin & Barneby
  - var. incurvata (Benth.) H.S.Irwin & Barneby
  - var. zanclodes (H.S.Irwin & Barneby) H.S.Irwin
- Chamaecrista lavradioides (Benth.) H.S.Irwin & Barneby
- Chamaecrista linearifolia (G.Don) H.S.Irwin & Barneby
  - var. bradei (Harms) H.S.Irwin & Barneby
  - var. linearifolia (G.Don) H.S.Irwin & Barneby
- Chamaecrista planifolia (H.S.Irwin & Barneby) H.S.Irwin

Series Lomatopodae

- Chamaecrista lomatopoda (Benth.) H.S.Irwin & Barneby

Series Lucidae

- Chamaecrista amambaya (H.S.Irwin & Barneby) H.S.Irwin
- Chamaecrista caiapo (H.S.Irwin & Barneby) H.S.Irwin
- Chamaecrista labouriaeae (H.S.Irwin & Barneby) H.S.Irwin
- Chamaecrista lamprosperma (Benth.) H.S.Irwin & Barneby
- Chamaecrista seticrenata (H.S.Irwin & Barneby) H.S.Irwin

Series Microphyllae

- Chamaecrista adenophora (Harms) H.S.Irwin & Barneby
- Chamaecrista cristalinae (H.S.Irwin & Barneby) H.S.Irwin
- Chamaecrista dalbergiifolia (Benth.) H.S.Irwin & Barneby
- Chamaecrista decrescens (Benth.) H.S.Irwin & Barneby
- Chamaecrista dumalis (Hoehne) H.S.Irwin & Barneby
- Chamaecrista elachistophylla (Harms) H.S.Irwin & Barneby
- Chamaecrista foederalis (H.S.Irwin & Barneby) H.S.Irwin
- Chamaecrista harmsiana H.S.Irwin & Barneby
- Chamaecrista huntii (H.S.Irwin & Barneby) H.S.Irwin
- Chamaecrista imbricans (H.S.Irwin & Barneby) H.S.Irwin
- Chamaecrista isidorea (Benth.) H.S.Irwin & Barneby
- Chamaecrista neesiana (Benth.) H.S.Irwin & Barneby
  - var. goyazensis (Taub.) H.S.Irwin & Barneby
  - var. laxiracemosa (Harms) H.S.Irwin & Barneby
  - var. neesiana (Benth.) H.S.Irwin & Barneby
  - var. subnitida (Taub.) H.S.Irwin & Barneby
- Chamaecrista nuda (H.S.Irwin & Barneby) H.S.Irwin
  - var. correntina (H.S.Irwin & Barneby) H.S.Irwin
  - var. huntii (H.S.Irwin & Barneby) H.S.Irwin
- Chamaecrista pohliana (Benth.) H.S.Irwin & Barneby
- Chamaecrista polymorpha (Harms) H.S.Irwin & Barneby
- Chamaecrista psoraleopsis (H.S.Irwin & Barneby) H.S.Irwin
- Chamaecrista sincorana (Harms) H.S.Irwin & Barneby
- Chamaecrista subdecrescens (H.S.Irwin & Barneby) H.S.Irwin

Series Nigricantes

- Chamaecrista calixtana (H.S.Irwin & Barneby) H.S.Irwin
- Chamaecrista fodinarum H.S.Irwin & Barneby
- Chamaecrista gilliesii (Harms) H.S.Irwin & Barneby
- Chamaecrista glischrodes H.S.Irwin & Barneby
- Chamaecrista itambana (Benth.) H.S.Irwin & Barneby
- Chamaecrista lavradiiflora (Harms) H.S.Irwin & Barneby
- Chamaecrista machaeriifolia (Benth.) H.S.Irwin & Barneby
- Chamaecrista philippi (H.S.Irwin & Barneby) H.S.Irwin
- Chamaecrista pilicarpa (Harms) H.S.Irwin & Barneby
- Chamaecrista sophoroides (Benth.) H.S.Irwin & Barneby
- Chamaecrista tephrosiifolia (Benth.) H.S.Irwin & Barneby
- Chamaecrista urophyllidia (H.S.Irwin & Barneby) H.S.Irwin

Series Ochnaceae

- Chamaecrista bifoliola (Harms) H.S.Irwin & Barneby
- Chamaecrista cotinifolia (G.Don) H.S.Irwin & Barneby
  - var. cotinifolia (G.Don) H.S.Irwin & Barneby
  - var. glaberrima (H.S.Irwin & Barneby) H.S.Irwin
  - var. leptodictya (H.S.Irwin & Barneby) H.S.Irwin
  - var. percoriacea (H.S.Irwin & Barneby) H.S.Irwin
- Chamaecrista crenulata (Benth.) H.S.Irwin & Barneby
- Chamaecrista desertorum (Benth.) H.S.Irwin & Barneby
- Chamaecrista geraldii (H.S.Irwin & Barneby) H.S.Irwin
- Chamaecrista ochnacea (Vogel) H.S.Irwin & Barneby
  - var. latifolia (Benth.) H.S.Irwin & Barneby
  - var. mollis (H.S.Irwin & Barneby) H.S.Irwin
  - var. ochnacea (Vogel) H.S.Irwin & Barneby
  - var. purpurascens (Benth.) H.S.Irwin & Barneby
  - var. speluncae (H.S.Irwin & Barneby) H.S.Irwin
- Chamaecrista punctata (Vogel) H.S.Irwin & Barneby
- Chamaecrista vauthieri (Benth.) H.S.Irwin & Barneby

Series Oligospermae

- Chamaecrista oligosperma (Benth.) H.S.Irwin & Barneby

Series Paniculatae

- Chamaecrista celiae (H.S.Irwin & Barneby) H.S.Irwin
- Chamaecrista claussenii (Benth.) H.S.Irwin & Barneby
  - var. claussenii (Benth.) H.S.Irwin & Barneby
  - var. cyclophylla (H.S.Irwin & Barneby) H.S.Irwin
  - var. megacycla (H.S.Irwin & Barneby) H.S.Irwin
- Chamaecrista lundii (Benth.) H.S.Irwin & Barneby
- Chamaecrista orbiculata (Benth.) H.S.Irwin & Barneby
  - var. cercidifolia (H.S.Irwin & Barneby) H.S.Irwin
  - var. orbiculata (Benth.) H.S.Irwin & Barneby
  - var. trichothyrsus (Harms) H.S.Irwin & Barneby
  - var. ustulata (H.S.Irwin & Barneby) H.S.Irwin
- Chamaecrista pachyclada (Harms) H.S.Irwin & Barneby
- Chamaecrista rigidifolia (Benth.) H.S.Irwin & Barneby
  - var. rigidifolia (Benth.) H.S.Irwin & Barneby
  - var. veadeirana (H.S.Irwin & Barneby) H.S.Irwin

Series Pinifoliae

- Chamaecrista paniculata (Benth.) H.S.Irwin & Barneby

Series Rigidulae

- Chamaecrista altoana (H.S.Irwin & Barneby) H.S.Irwin
- Chamaecrista azulana (H.S.Irwin & Barneby) H.S.Irwin
- Chamaecrista benthamiana (Harms) H.S.Irwin & Barneby
- Chamaecrista brachyblepharis (Harms) H.S.Irwin & Barneby
- Chamaecrista brachyrachis (Harms) H.S.Irwin & Barneby
- Chamaecrista chaetostegia (H.S.Irwin & Barneby) H.S.Irwin
  - var. chaetostegia (H.S.Irwin & Barneby) H.S.Irwin
  - var. obolaria (H.S.Irwin & Barneby) H.S.Irwin
- Chamaecrista ciliolata (Benth.) H.S.Irwin & Barneby
  - var. caprina (H.S.Irwin & Barneby) H.S.Irwin
  - var. ciliolata (Benth.) H.S.Irwin & Barneby
  - var. pulchella (H.S.Irwin & Barneby) H.S.Irwin
- Chamaecrista cipoana (H.S.Irwin & Barneby) H.S.Irwin
- Chamaecrista dawsonii (Cowan) H.S.Irwin & Barneby
- Chamaecrista decumbens (Benth.) H.S.Irwin & Barneby
- Chamaecrista densifolia (Benth.) H.S.Irwin & Barneby
- Chamaecrista feliciana (H.S.Irwin & Barneby) H.S.Irwin
- Chamaecrista filicifolia (Benth.) H.S.Irwin & Barneby
- Chamaecrista glaucofilix (H.S.Irwin & Barneby) H.S.Irwin
- Chamaecrista gymnothyrsa (H.S.Irwin & Barneby) H.S.Irwin
- Chamaecrista macedoi (H.S.Irwin & Barneby) H.S.Irwin
- Chamaecrista mollicaulis (Harms) H.S.Irwin & Barneby
- Chamaecrista multipennis (H.S.Irwin & Barneby) H.S.Irwin
- Chamaecrista nanodes (H.S.Irwin & Barneby) H.S.Irwin
- Chamaecrista nummulariifolia (Benth.) H.S.Irwin & Barneby
- Chamaecrista planaltoana (Harms) H.S.Irwin & Barneby
- Chamaecrista polita (H.S.Irwin & Barneby) H.S.Irwin
- Chamaecrista strictula (H.S.Irwin & Barneby) H.S.Irwin

As traditionally circumscribed here, Chamaecrista ser. Rigidulae is polyphyletic. However, the series is monophyletic if redefined to exclude C. brachyblepharis and C. ciliolata and include C. sincorana and C. botryoides (from series Microphyllae). The species in the series are all endemic to Brazil and can be divided geographically into two main lineages, one from the highlands of Goiás, and the second from the Espinhaço Range of Bahia and Minas Gerais.

Series Secundae

- Chamaecrista secunda (Benth.) H.S.Irwin & Barneby

Series Setosae

- Chamaecrista amphibola (H.S.Irwin & Barneby) H.S.Irwin
- Chamaecrista auris-zerdae (H.S.Irwin & Barneby) H.S.Irwin
- Chamaecrista campicola (Harms) H.S.Irwin & Barneby
- Chamaecrista obtecta (Benth.) H.S.Irwin & Barneby
- Chamaecrista ochrosperma (H.S.Irwin & Barneby) H.S.Irwin
- Chamaecrista orenocensis (Benth.) H.S.Irwin & Barneby
- Chamaecrista scabra (Benth.) H.S.Irwin & Barneby
- Chamaecrista setosa (Vogel) H.S.Irwin & Barneby
  - var. detonsa (Benth.) H.S.Irwin & Barneby
  - var. paucivenia (H.S.Irwin & Barneby) H.S.Irwin
  - var. setosa (Vogel) H.S.Irwin & Barneby
  - var. subsetosa (Malme) H.S.Irwin & Barneby

Series Spinulosae

- Chamaecrista spinulosa (H.S.Irwin & Barneby) H.S.Irwin

Series Strictifoliae

- Chamaecrista strictifolia (Benth.) H.S.Irwin & Barneby

Series Trachycarpae

- Chamaecrista cavalcantina (H.S.Irwin & Barneby) H.S.Irwin
- Chamaecrista trachycarpa (Vogel) H.S.Irwin & Barneby
  - var. acutifolia (Benth.) H.S.Irwin & Barneby
  - var. trachycarpa (Vogel) H.S.Irwin & Barneby
- Chamaecrista venatoria (H.S.Irwin & Barneby) H.S.Irwin

Series Unijugae

- Chamaecrista catapodia (H.S.Irwin & Barneby) H.S.Irwin
- Chamaecrista monticola (Benth.) H.S.Irwin & Barneby

Series Ursinae

- Chamaecrista adamantina (H.S.Irwin & Barneby) H.S.Irwin
- Chamaecrista astrochiton (H.S.Irwin & Barneby) H.S.Irwin
- Chamaecrista aurivilla (Benth.) H.S.Irwin & Barneby
- Chamaecrista centiflora (H.S.Irwin & Barneby) H.S.Irwin
- Chamaecrista exsudans (Benth.) H.S.Irwin & Barneby
- Chamaecrista fuscescens (Benth.) H.S.Irwin & Barneby
- Chamaecrista ixodes (H.S.Irwin & Barneby) H.S.Irwin
- Chamaecrista leucopilis (Harms) H.S.Irwin & Barneby
- Chamaecrista ursina (Benth.) H.S.Irwin & Barneby
- Chamaecrista virginis (H.S.Irwin & Barneby) H.S.Irwin
- Chamaecrista xanthadena (Benth.) H.S.Irwin & Barneby

Subsection Adenophyllum Irwin & Barneby

- Chamaecrista bucherae (Moldenke) H.S.Irwin & Barneby (Cuba)

Subsection Baseophyllum (Colladon) Irwin & Barneby

- Chamaecrista coriacea (Benth.) H.S.Irwin & Barneby
- Chamaecrista cytisoides (DC. ex Collad.) H. S. Irwin & Barneby
  - var. blanchetii (Benth.) H.S.Irwin & Barneby
  - var. brachystachya (Benth.) H.S.Irwin & Barneby
  - var. confertiformis (H.S.Irwin & Barneby) H.S.Irwin
  - var. cytisoides (DC. ex Collad.) H. S. Irwin & Barneby
  - var. decora (H.S.Irwin & Barneby) H.S.Irwin
  - var. micrantha (H.S.Irwin & Barneby) H.S.Irwin
  - var. unijuga (Benth.) H.S.Irwin & Barneby

Subsection Otophyllum Irwin & Barneby

- Chamaecrista debilis (Vogel) H.S.Irwin & Barneby

=== Section Caliciopsis Irwin & Barneby ===
- Chamaecrista calycioides (DC. ex Collad.) Greene
- Chamaecrista duckeana (P.Bezerra & Alf.Fern.) H.S.Irwin

=== Section Chamaecrista Moench ===
Series Bauhinianae (Colladon) Irwin & Barneby

- Chamaecrista basifolia (Vogel) H.S.Irwin & Barneby
- Chamaecrista rotundifolia (Pers.) Greene
  - var. rotundifolia (Pers.) Greene
  - var. grandiflora (Benth.) H.S.Irwin & Barneby

Series Chamaecrista Moench

- Chamaecrista chamaecristoides (Collad.) Greene
  - var. brandegeei (Britton & Rose) H.S.Irwin & Barneby
  - var. chamaecristoides (Collad.) Greene
  - var. cruziana (Britton & Rose) H.S.Irwin & Barneby
- Chamaecrista cuprea H.S.Irwin & Barneby
- Chamaecrista deeringiana Small & Pennell
- Chamaecrista fasciculata (Michx.) Greene—showy partridge pea
- Chamaecrista glandulosa (L.) Greene—Jamaican broom
  - var. andicola H.S.Irwin & Barneby
  - var. andreana (Britton & Killip) H.S.Irwin & Barneby
  - var. brasiliensis (Vogel) H.S.Irwin & Barneby
  - var. flavicoma (Kunth) H.S.Irwin & Barneby
  - var. glandulosa (L.) Greene
  - var. mirabilis (Pollard) H.S.Irwin & Barneby
  - var. parralensis (H.S.Irwin & Barneby) H.S.Irwin
  - var. picardae (Urb.) H.S.Irwin & Barneby
  - var. swartzii (Wikstr.) H.S.Irwin & Barneby
  - var. tristicula (Kunth) H.S.Irwin & Barneby
- Chamaecrista lineata (Sw.) Greene
  - var. brachyloba (Griseb.) H.S.Irwin & Barneby
  - var. brevipila (Urb.) H.S.Irwin & Barneby
  - var. jamaicensis (Britton) H.S.Irwin & Barneby
  - var. keyensis (Pennell) H.S.Irwin & Barneby
  - var. lineata (Sw.) Greene
  - var. pinoi (Britton & Rose) H.S.Irwin & Barneby
- Chamaecrista mimosoides (L.) Greene
- Chamaecrista nictitans (L.) Moench
  - subsp. brachypoda (Benth.) H.S.Irwin & Barneby
  - subsp. disadena (Steud.) H.S.Irwin & Barneby
  - subsp. nictitans (L.) Moench
  - subsp. patellaria (Collad.) H.S.Irwin & Barneby
  - var. aspera (Elliott) Torr. & A.Gray
  - var. diffusa (DC.) H.S. Irwin & Barneby
  - var. glabrata (Vogel) H.S. Irwin & Barneby
  - var. jaliscensis (Greenm.) H.S. Irwin & Barneby
  - var. mensalis (Greenm.) H.S.Irwin & Barneby
  - var. pilosa (Benth.) H.S. Irwin & Barneby
  - var. praetexta (Vogel) H.S. Irwin & Barneby
- Chamaecrista obcordata (Sw.) Britton
- Chamaecrista pascuorum (Benth.) H.S.Irwin & Barneby
- Chamaecrista pedemontana H.S.Irwin & Barneby
- Chamaecrista pedicellaris (DC.) Britton
  - var. adenosperma (Urb.) H.S.Irwin & Barneby
  - var. pedicellaris (DC.) Britton
- Chamaecrista portoricensis (Urb.) O.F.Cook & G.N.Collins
- Chamaecrista pygmaea (DC.) Britton
  - var. pygmaea (DC.) Britton
  - var. savannarum (Britton) H.S.Irwin & Barneby
- Chamaecrista repens (Vogel) H.S.Irwin & Barneby
  - var. multijuga (Benth.) H.S.Irwin & Barneby
  - var. repens (Vogel) H.S.Irwin & Barneby
- Chamaecrista rufa (M.Martens & Galeotti) Britton
- Chamaecrista venturiana H.S.Irwin & Barneby
- Chamaecrista vestita (Vogel) H.S.Irwin & Barneby

Series Coriaceae (Bentham) Irwin & Barneby

- Chamaecrista anceps (Benth.) H.S.Irwin & Barneby
- Chamaecrista aristata (Benth.) H.S.Irwin & Barneby
- Chamaecrista burchellii (Benth.) H.S.Irwin & Barneby
- Chamaecrista cardiostegia H.S.Irwin & Barneby
- Chamaecrista caribaea (Northr.) Britton
  - var. caribaea (Northr.) Britton
  - var. inaguensis (Britton) H.S.Irwin & Barneby
  - var. lucayana (Britton) H.S.Irwin & Barneby
- Chamaecrista choriophylla (Vogel) H.S.Irwin & Barneby
  - var. choriophylla (Vogel) H.S.Irwin & Barneby
  - var. latifolia (Benth.) H.S.Irwin & Barneby
  - var. rossicorum H.S.Irwin & Barneby
- Chamaecrista cinerascens (Vogel) H.S.Irwin & Barneby
- Chamaecrista distichoclada (Benth.) H.S.Irwin & Barneby
- Chamaecrista lagotois H.S.Irwin & Barneby
- Chamaecrista mucronata (Spreng.) H.S.Irwin & Barneby
- Chamaecrista multinervia (Benth.) H.S.Irwin & Barneby
- Chamaecrista olesiphylla (Vogel) H.S.Irwin & Barneby
- Chamaecrista papillata H.S.Irwin & Barneby
- Chamaecrista potentilla (Benth.) H.S.Irwin & Barneby
- Chamaecrista roraimae (Benth.) Gleason
- Chamaecrista rotundata (Vogel) H.S.Irwin & Barneby
  - var. rotundata (Vogel) H.S.Irwin & Barneby
  - var. grandistipula (Vogel) H.S.Irwin & Barneby
- Chamaecrista simplifacta H.S.Irwin & Barneby
- Chamaecrista tragacanthoides (Benth.) H.S.Irwin & Barneby
  - var. rasa H.S.Irwin & Barneby
  - var. tragacanthoides (Benth.) H.S.Irwin & Barneby
- Chamaecrista ulmea H.S.Irwin & Barneby
- Chamaecrista venulosa (Benth.) H.S.Irwin & Barneby

Series Flexuosae Irwin & Barneby

- Chamaecrista flexuosa (L.) Greene
  - var. flexuosa (L.) Greene
  - var. texana (Buckley) H.S.Irwin & Barneby
- Chamaecrista gononclada (Benth.) H.S.Irwin & Barneby
- Chamaecrista parvistipula (Benth.) H.S.Irwin & Barneby
- Chamaecrista swainsonii (Benth.) H.S.Irwin & Barneby

Series Greggianae Irwin & Barneby

- Chamaecrista greggii (A. Gray) Pollard ex A. H. Heller
  - var. greggii (A. Gray) Pollard ex A. H. Heller
  - var. macdougaliana (Rose) H.S.Irwin & Barneby
  - var. potosina (Britton & Rose) H.S.Irwin & Barneby

Series Prostratae (Bentham) Irwin & Bameby

- Chamaecrista cordistipula (Mart.) H.S.Irwin & Barneby
- Chamaecrista kunthiana (Schltdl. & Cham.) H. S. Irwin & Barneby
- Chamaecrista pilosa (L.) Greene
  - var. luxurians (Benth.) H.S.Irwin & Barneby
  - var. pilosa (L.) Greene
- Chamaecrista serpens (L.) Greene
  - var. delicata (Britton & Rose) H.S.Irwin & Barneby
  - var. grandiflora (Benth.) H.S.Irwin & Barneby
  - var. mensarum (A.R.Molina) H.S.Irwin & Barneb
  - var. serpens (L.) Greene
  - var. wrightii (A.Gray) H.S.Irwin & Barneby
- Chamaecrista supplex (Benth.) Britton & Killip
- Chamaecrista tenuisepala (Benth.) H.S.Irwin & Barneby
- Chamaecrista trichopoda (Benth.) Britton & Killip

=== Section Grimaldia (Schrank) Irwin & Barneby ===
- Chamaecrista absus (L.) H.S.Irwin & Barneby
  - var. absus (L.) H.S.Irwin & Barneby
  - var. meonandra (H.S.Irwin & Barneby) H.S.Irwin

=== Section Xerocalyx (Bentham) Irwin & Barneby ===
- Chamaecrista desvauxii (Collad.) Killip
  - var. brevipes (Benth.) H.S.Irwin & Barneby
  - var. desvauxii (Collad.) Killip
  - var. langsdorffii (Kunth ex Vogel) H.S.Irwin & Barneby
  - var. latifolia (Benth.) H.S.Irwin & Barneby
  - var. latistipula (Benth.) G.P.Lewis
  - var. linearis (H.S.Irwin) H.S.Irwin & Barneby
  - var. malacophylla (Vogel) H.S.Irwin & Barneby
  - var. mollissima (Benth.) H.S.Irwin & Barneby
  - var. pirebebuiensis (Chodat & Hassl.) H.S.Irwin & Barneby
  - var. saxatilis (Amshoff) H.S.Irwin & Barneby
  - var. triumviralis H.S.Irwin & Barneby
- Chamaecrista diphylla (L.) Greene
- Chamaecrista ramosa (Vogel) H.S.Irwin & Barneby
  - var. curvifolia (Vogel) G.P.Lewis
  - var. erythrocalyx (Benth.) H.S.Irwin & Barneby
  - var. lucida (Benth.) H.S.Irwin & Barneby
  - var. parvifoliola (H.S.Irwin) H.S.Irwin & Barneby
  - var. ramosa (Vogel) H.S.Irwin & Barneby
  - var. ventuarensis (H.S.Irwin) H.S.Irwin & Barneby

=== Incertae sedis ===
- Chamaecrista africana (Steyaert) Lock
- Chamaecrista aldabrensis (Hemsl.) F. Friedmann
- Chamaecrista amabilis H.S.Irwin & Barneby
- Chamaecrista amorimii Barneby
- Chamaecrista anamariae Conc., L.P. Queiroz & G.P. Lewis
- Chamaecrista angustissima (Lam.) Greene
- Chamaecrista ankaratrensis (R.Vig.) Du Puy
- Chamaecrista arachiphylla Barneby
- Chamaecrista arboae Barneby
- Chamaecrista arenicola (R.Vig.) Du Puy
  - var. arenicola (R.Vig.) Du Puy
  - var. dunensis (R.Vig.) Du Puy
- Chamaecrista auricoma (Benth.) V.Singh
- Chamaecrista axilliflora H.S.Irwin & Barneby
- Chamaecrista biensis (Steyaert) Lock
- Chamaecrista botryoides Conc., L.P. Queiroz & G.P. Lewis
- Chamaecrista brevifolia (Lam.) Greene
  - var. brevifolia (Lam.) Greene
  - var. glabra (Brenan) Du Puy
- Chamaecrista capensis (Thunb.) E.Mey.
- Chamaecrista caspariifolia Barneby
- Chamaecrista catolesensis Conc., L.P. Queiroz & G.P. Lewis
- Chamaecrista chiquitana Barneby
- Chamaecrista comosa E.Mey.
  - var. comosa E.Mey.
  - var. capricornia (Steyaert) Lock
- Chamaecrista concinna (Benth.) Pedley
- Chamaecrista coradinii H.S. Irwin & Barneby
- Chamaecrista decora (H. S. Irwin & Barneby) Conc. et al.
- Chamaecrista deltoidea Hervencio & L.P. Queiroz
- Chamaecrista depauperata Conc., L.P. Queiroz & G.P. Lewis
- Chamaecrista dimidiata (Buch.-Ham. ex Roxb.) Lock
- Chamaecrista duboisii (Steyaert) Lock
- Chamaecrista dumaziana (Brenan) Du Puy
- Chamaecrista dunensis Thulin
- Chamaecrista exilis (Vatke) Lock
- Chamaecrista fagifolia Bertol
- Chamaecrista falcinella (Oliv.) Lock
  - var. falcinella (Oliv.) Lock
  - var. intermedia (Brenan) Lock
  - var. parviflora (Steyaert) Lock
- Chamaecrista fallacina (Chiov.) Lock
- Chamaecrista fenarolii (Mendonca & Torre) Lock
- Chamaecrista fulgida Barneby
- Chamaecrista garambiensis (Hosokawa) H.Ohashi, Tateshi & Nemoto
- Chamaecrista ghesquiereana (Brenan) Lock
- Chamaecrista gracilior (Ghesq.) Lock
- Chamaecrista grantii (Oliv.) Standl.
- Chamaecrista gumminans H.S.Irwin & Barneby
- Chamaecrista harneyi (Specht) Govaerts
- Chamaecrista hecatophylla (DC.) Greene
- Chamaecrista hildebrandtii (Vatke) Lock
- Chamaecrista huillensis (Mendonca & Torre) Lock
- Chamaecrista jaegeri (Keay) Lock
- Chamaecrista kalulensis (Steyaert) Lock
- Chamaecrista katangensis (Ghesq.) Lock
  - var. katangensis (Ghesq.) Lock
  - var. nuda (Steyaert) Lock
- Chamaecrista kirkii (Oliv.) Standl.
  - var. glabra (Steyaert) Lock
  - var. kirkii (Oliv.) Standl.
  - var. guineensis (Steyaert) Lock
- Chamaecrista kleinii (Wight & Arn.) V.Singh
- Chamaecrista kolabensis ("Kothari, Moorthy & M.P.Nayar") V.Singh
- Chamaecrista lateriticola (R.Vig.) Du Puy
- Chamaecrista leptocarpa Benth.
- Chamaecrista leschenaultiana (DC.) O. Deg.
- Chamaecrista longipes (Domin) Pedley
- Chamaecrista meelii (Steyaert) Lock
- Chamaecrista mindanaensis (Merr.) K.Larsen
- Chamaecrista newtonii (Mendonca & Torre) Lock
- Chamaecrista nigricans (Vahl) Greene
- Chamaecrista nilgirica (V.Singh) V.Singh
- Chamaecrista nomame (Sieber) H.Ohashi
- Chamaecrista paralias (Brenan) Lock
- Chamaecrista parva (Steyaert) Lock
- Chamaecrista plumosa E.Mey.
  - var. erecta (Schorn & Gordon-Gray) Lock
  - var. plumosa E.Mey.
- Chamaecrista polytricha (Brenan) Lock
  - var. pauciflora (Brenan) Lock
  - var. polytricha (Brenan) Lock
  - var. pulchella (Brenan) Lock
- Chamaecrista pratensis (R.Vig.) Du Puy
- Chamaecrista pteropoda Barneby
- Chamaecrista puccioniana (Chiov.) Lock
- Chamaecrista pumila (Lam.) K.Larsen
- Chamaecrista reducta (Brenan) Du Puy
- Chamaecrista robynsiana (Ghesq.) Lock
- Chamaecrista rupestrium H.S.Irwin & Barneby
- Chamaecrista schmitzii (Steyaert) Lock
- Chamaecrista speciosa Conc., L.P. Queiroz & G.P. Lewis
- Chamaecrista stricta E.Mey.
- Chamaecrista tagera (L.) Standl.
- Chamaecrista telfairiana (Hook.f.) Lock
- Chamaecrista usambarensis (Taub.) Standl.
- Chamaecrista verruculosa Afr.Fern. & E.P. Nunes
- Chamaecrista wallichiana (DC.) V.Singh
- Chamaecrista wittei (Ghesq.) Lock
- Chamaecrista zambesica (Oliv.) Lock

== Species names with uncertain taxonomic status ==
The status of the following species is unresolved:

- Chamaecrista bella Conc., L.P.Queiroz & G.P.Lewis
- Chamaecrista biddulphiana Pedley
- Chamaecrista bissei A.Barreto & Yakovlev
- Chamaecrista ×blanchetiformis Conc., L.P.Queiroz & Borba
- Chamaecrista blanchetii (Benth.) Conc., L.P.Queiroz & G.P.Lewis
- Chamaecrista burmanni Eckl. & Zeyh.
- Chamaecrista commixta auct.
- Chamaecrista cupeyalensis A.Barreto & Yakovlev
- Chamaecrista deserti Pedley
- Chamaecrista exigua Pedley
- Chamaecrista falcifoliolata A.Barreto & Yakovlev
- Chamaecrista grisea Pedley
- Chamaecrista guanensis A.Barreto & Yakovlev
- Chamaecrista macambensis A.Barreto & Yakovlev
- Chamaecrista maritima Pedley
- Chamaecrista moorei Pedley
- Chamaecrista mwangokae Gereau & G.M.Walters
- Chamaecrista nana Conc., L.P.Queiroz & G.P.Lewis
- Chamaecrista ×patyensis Conc., L.P.Queiroz & Borba
- Chamaecrista rusbyi Britton & Rose ex Pittier
- Chamaecrista symonii Pedley
- Chamaecrista takhtajanii A.Barreto & Yakovlev
- Chamaecrista vestita (Vogel) Govaerts
- Chamaecrista xanthadena (Mart. ex Benth.) Govaerts
