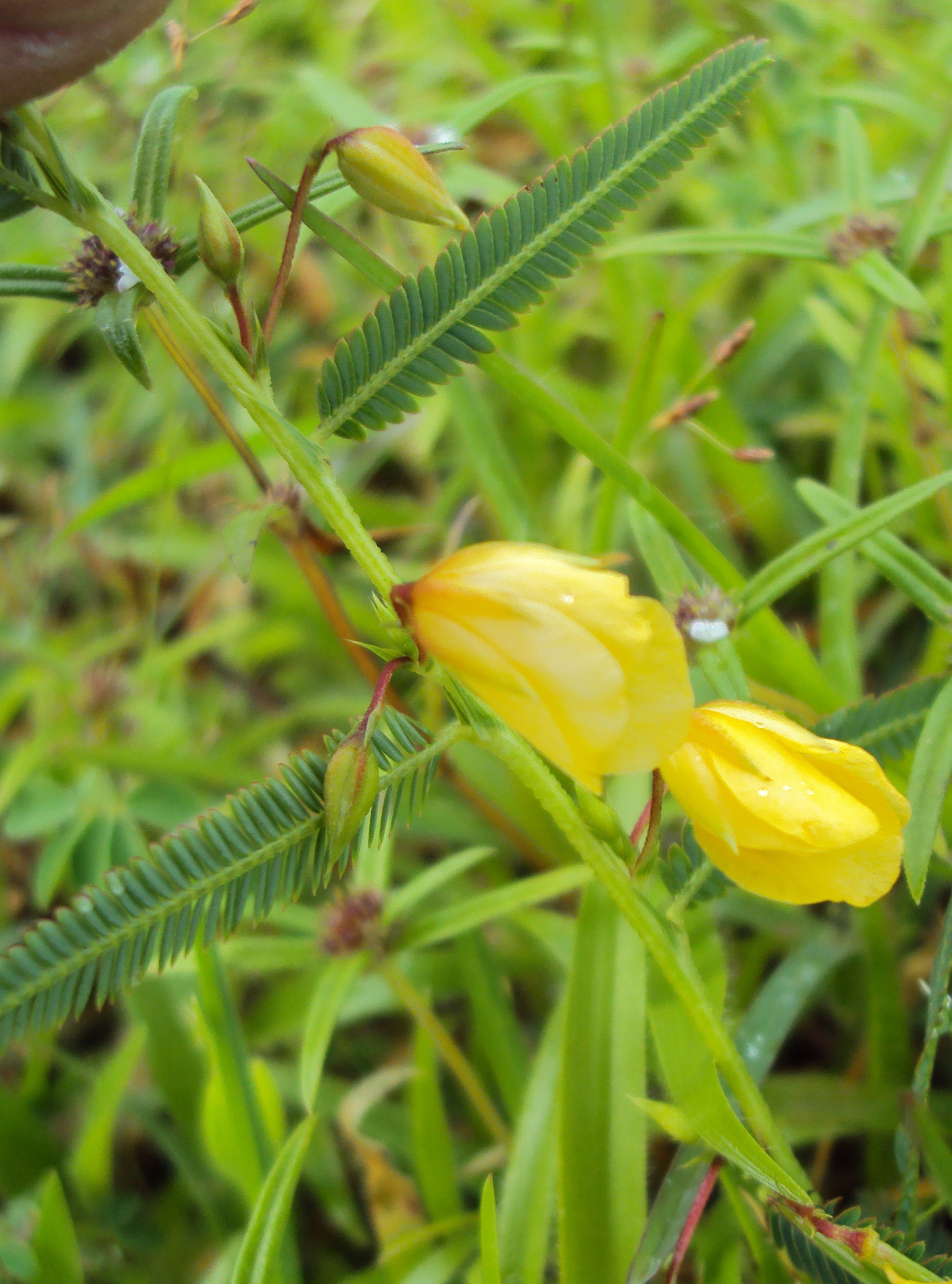

Conservation status
- Least Concern (IUCN 3.1)

Scientific classification
- Kingdom: Plantae
- Clade: Tracheophytes
- Clade: Angiosperms
- Clade: Eudicots
- Clade: Rosids
- Order: Fabales
- Family: Fabaceae
- Subfamily: Caesalpinioideae
- Genus: Chamaecrista
- Species: C. mimosoides

Binomial name
- Chamaecrista mimosoides (L.) Greene

Synonyms
- Cassia mimosoides L. Nictitella mimosoides (L.) Raf.

= Chamaecrista mimosoides =

Species of legume

Chamaecrista mimosoides is a species of flowering plant in the plant family Fabaceae.

== Description ==
Chamaecrista mimosoides, commonly known as fish-bone cassia, is a subshrub, annual, or perennial plant that occurs mainly in seasonally dry tropical regions. The species is locally common on sandy soils. It has a pithy stem that is woody at the base and either glabrous or sparsely hairy. The plant is also known by the common names Japanese tea and tea senna.

== Distribution ==
This species is native to Tropical and Southern Africa, extending through Tropical Asia to Northern Australia

== Uses ==
In India, the root of Chamaecrista mimosoides is traditionally used to treat diarrhea and stomach spasms. The powdered leaves are applied for dressing wounds and sores, as well as for managing mouth ulcers, stomach spasms, and headaches.
