= Sand spurge =

List of plants with the same or similar names

Sand spurge is a common name of two species of plant:

- Euphorbia psammogeton, native to Australia
- Phyllanthus warnockii, native to North America, also known as sand reverchonia
