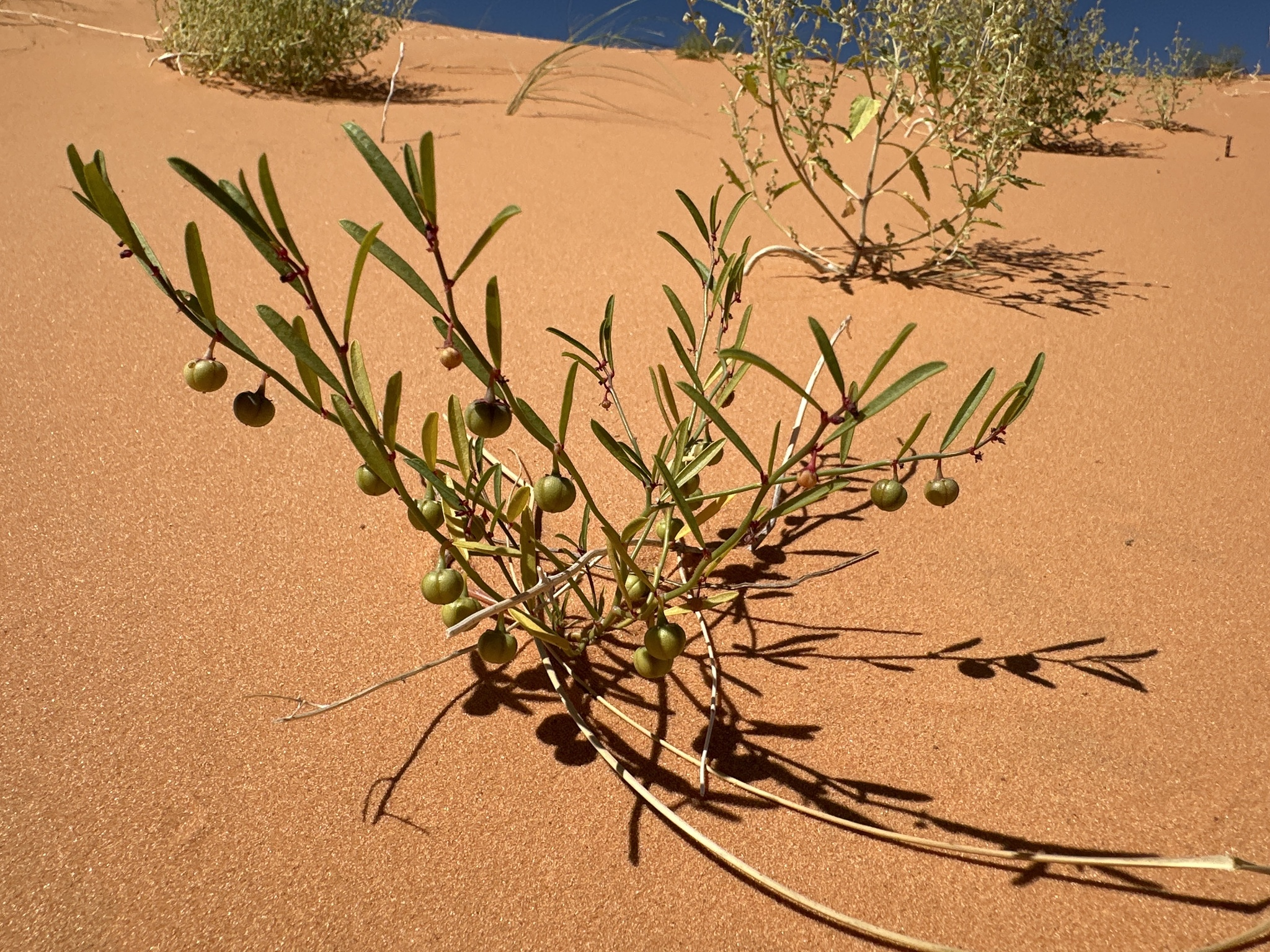
- With fruits and flowers in Coral Pink Sand Dunes State Park, Kane County, Utah

Conservation status
- Apparently Secure (NatureServe)

Scientific classification
- Kingdom: Plantae
- Clade: Embryophytes
- Clade: Tracheophytes
- Clade: Spermatophytes
- Clade: Angiosperms
- Clade: Eudicots
- Clade: Rosids
- Order: Malpighiales
- Family: Phyllanthaceae
- Genus: Phyllanthus
- Species: P. warnockii

Binomial name
- Phyllanthus warnockii G.L.Webster

Synonyms
- Moeroris arenaria (A.Gray) R.W.Bouman; Reverchonia arenaria A.Gray

= Phyllanthus warnockii =

Plant species in the leaf-flower family

Phyllanthus warnockii, the sand reverchonia, is a plant species of the leaf-flower family. It is an annual that specializes in growing on sand dunes in the Southwestern United States and adjacent northeastern Mexico. Though experiments found it to be poisonous to sheep, members of the Hopi Tribe in northeastern Arizona traditionally use the berries to oil and season cooking slabs for making corn wafer bread.

== Description ==
Sand reverchonia is a herbaceous annual species growing to a height of 10 to 50 centimeters, though usually not taller than 30 cm. It grows from a taproot with little branching. It is monoecious, having separate flowers producing pollen or seeds, but having both types on the same plant. Plants grow straight upwards, but often have numerous side branches that extend out widely and are hairless. The lowest branches can be as much as 20–30 cm long and 1.5–2 millimeters thick. Its sap is not milky.

The leaves of sand reverchonia are attached by short leaf stems and are not lobed or toothed along their edges. They attached alternately to the stems and are linear-oblong, shaped like a rectangle with rounded corners, but very narrow, to narrowly elliptic, having a shape where the leaf sides are gently curving from base to point with the widest part in the middle. However, the seed leaves are attached oppositely and are enlarged to point that they look like narrow adult leaves. Adult leaves are 1.5 to 4.5 cm long and just 1.8 to 9 mm across. The base of the leaves are two small reddish, papery stipules, 0.7–2.3 mm.

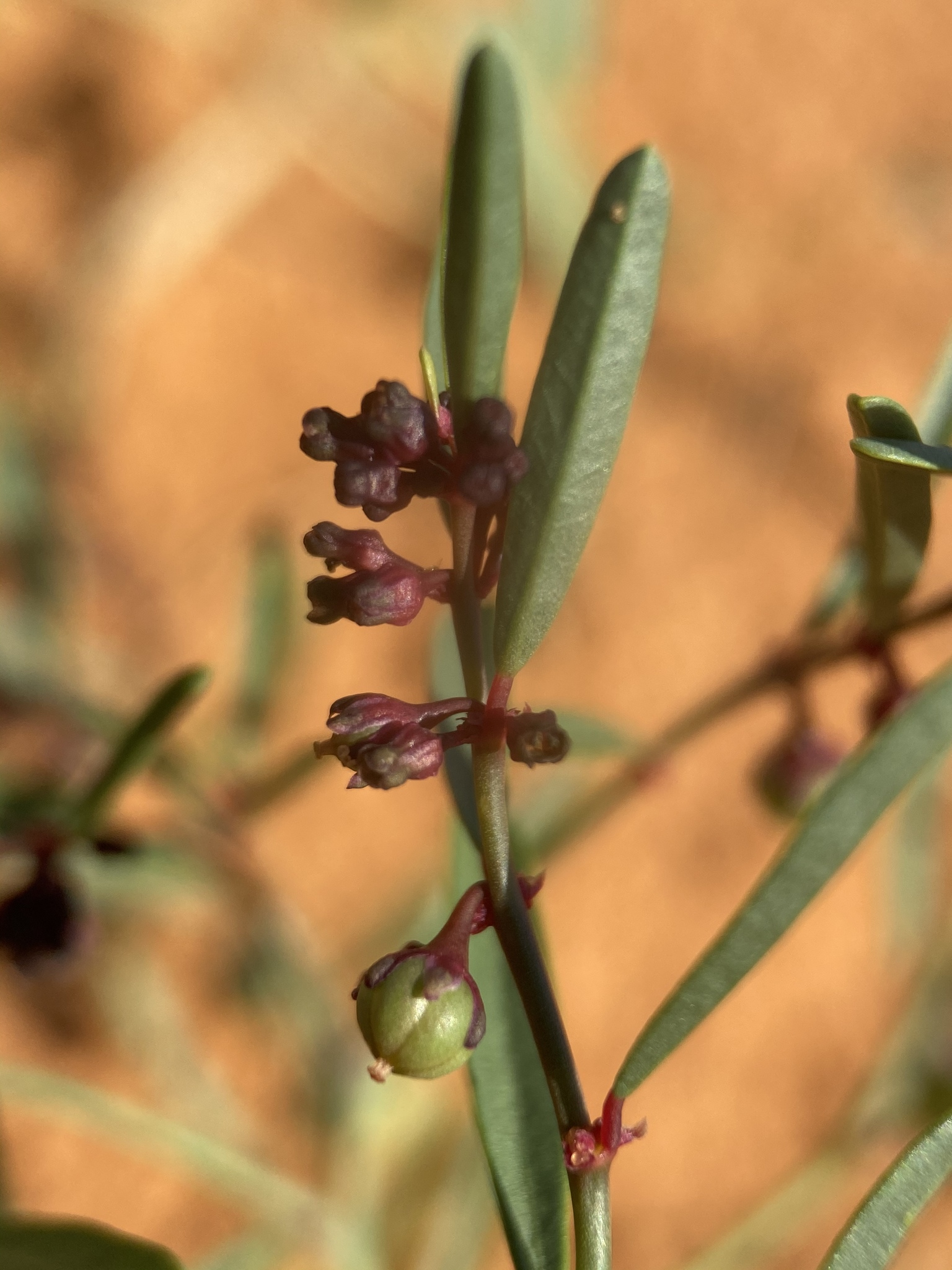
The flowers at the end of a branch

The flowers are in small clusters at the base of leaves on the side branches. Each cluster has a central flower with a pistil that will produce a fruit if fertilized and four to six pollen producing staminate flowers around it. The flowers are dark red-purple with four sepals on the pollen flowers and six, or less frequently five, on the seed flowers. Each pollen flower is 1.5–2.5 mm long and 0.7–1.5 mm across while the 1.3–2.9 mm long and 1.1–1.8 mm wide in the seed flowers.

The fruit is a spherical to slightly flattened capsule measuring 7–10 mm across. Each capsule has six seeds, two each in the three chambers. The seeds are three sided and range in color from dark to red-brown. The two faces facing other seeds are smooth, but the outer face is papillate, somewhat bumpy, and has a grove along the inner edge. They measure 4–6.5 mm.

=== Toxicity ===
In a limited experiment feeding the plant to confined sheep and cattle published in the 1960s it was found to be toxic. Sheep showed symptoms after being fed 1% of their body weight in freshly collected plant material, but cattle were less affected. The experimental animals had acute damage to the liver and kidneys, but in the cases of free roaming animals they had chronic symptoms and extensive fibrosis. Its symptoms are similar to those caused by Phyllanthus abnormis. Nothing is known of the toxin in sand reverchonia or if other mammals will be similarly harmed.

== Taxonomy ==
Phyllanthus warnockii was scientifically described and named in 2007 by Grady Webster. The paper doing so was published after his death after being revised by Victor W. Steinmann. It is part of the genus Phyllanthus which is classified in the family Phyllanthaceae. It has two homotypic synonyms. Reverchonia arenaria which was described in 1880 by Asa Gray and Moeroris arenaria from 2022 when Roderick Bouman moved it to Moeroris, a synonym of Phyllanthus. The classification as Phyllanthus warnockii is listed as accepted by Plants of the World Online and World Flora Online, but Moeroris arenaria is listed as accepted by World Plants, and the older name Reverchonia arenaria is used by NatureServe, the USDA Natural Resources Conservation Service, and the Lady Bird Johnson Wildflower Center.

The description by Asa Gray placed the species by itself in the genus Reverchonia, named for Julien Reverchon, a French emigrant to Texas who became plant collector and botanist. He collected the type specimen from a sandy island in the Brazos River near Seymour, Texas in 1879. Gray noted in his description that it resembled species in Phyllanthus, but that it had a combination of characters that make it quite different from other species in the genus. The genus was retained by botanists in the 1960s including Barton Holland Warnock and Webster, though they raised questions about its validity. Genetic studies in the early 2000s convinced Webster that it should be properly placed with the other species of Phyllanthus.

=== Names ===
The new species name, warnockii, was selected by Webster to honor the contributions of Barton Warnock to the botany of the Big Bend Reigion of Texas. The previous species name, arenaria, was Botanical Latin meaning "sand" or "sandy place". The common names of the species are also related to it being limited to sandy habitats, for example sand reverchonia, dune reverchon, sand spurge, and sandspurge. Although, the species Euphorbia psammogeton is also known as sand spurge.

In the Hopi language it is called pa:’tangwuva’pi because the fruits resemble small pumpkins, pa’tnga.

== Range and habitat ==
Sand reverchonia is native to seven central and western US states and to the state of Chihuahua in northeastern Mexico. It grows in western Kansas, Oklahoma, and Texas. It is rare in Colorado, only being recorded in Bent County. Plants are found in the three southernmost Utah counties, Washington, Kane, and San Juan, and also in three northern Arizonan counties, Coconino, Navajo, and Apache. In New Mexico it grows in five widely scattered southern counties. The Samalayuca Dune Fields that support the species in Chihuahua are south of Ciudad Juárez in the northeastern corner of the state. Its elevation range is from 300 to 1,800 meters (980–5,910 ft) and its habitat is limited to areas of quartz sands such as dunes.

== Uses ==
The traditional way of preparing piki, a waffer bread made of corn, is on a stone cooking surface. Most frequently the seeds of watermelons or squash are used to oil the stone, but the fruits of sand reverchonia are also used at times. In 1905 H. R. Voth recorded that the Hopi living at Oraibi, Arizona would use sand reverchonia as a medicine called táingwa similarly to the roots of the "blood medicine" Eriogonum annuum to prevent postpartum hemorrhage, though Voth did not record a method of preparation.
