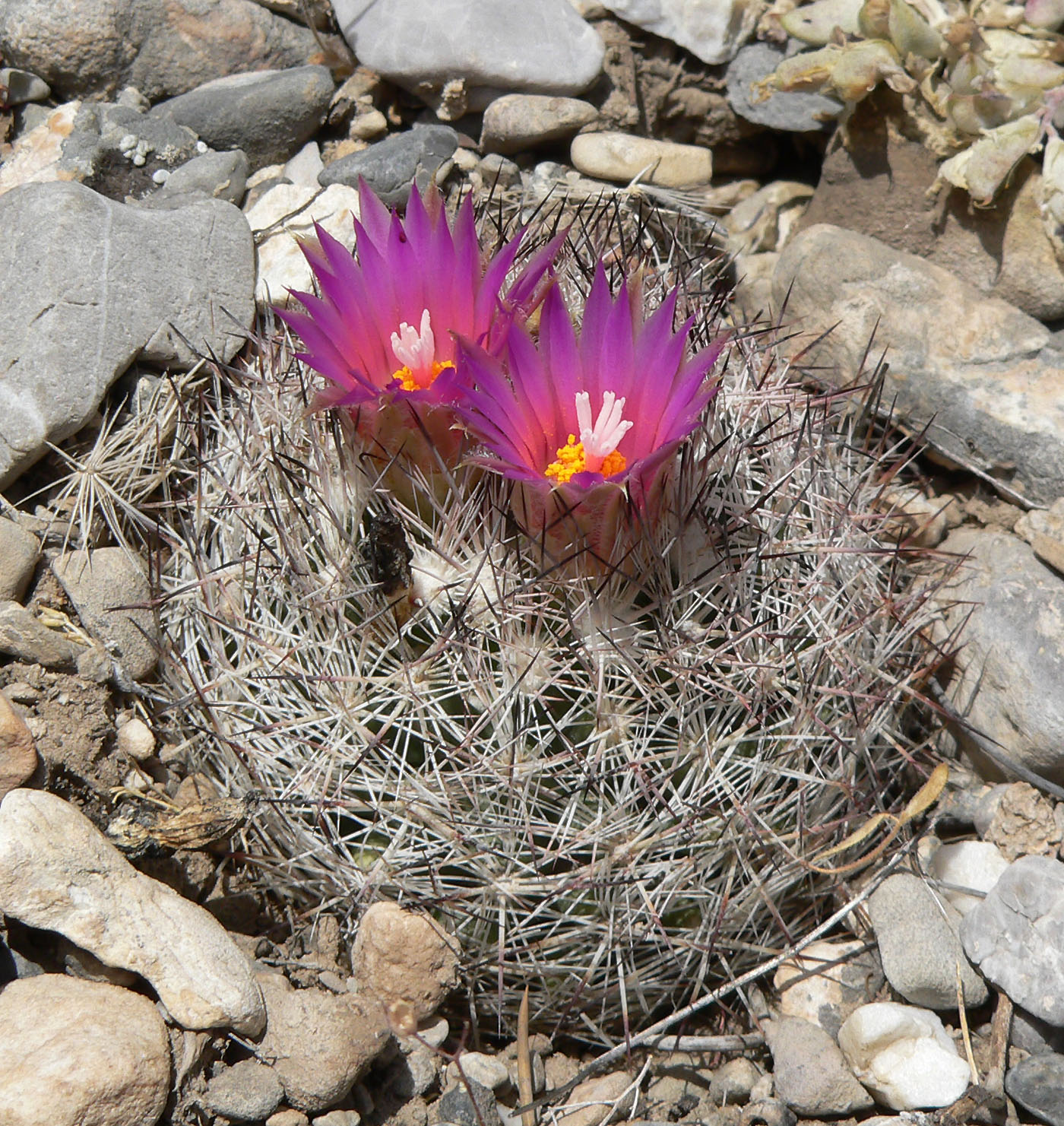

Conservation status
- Least Concern (IUCN 3.1)

Scientific classification
- Kingdom: Plantae
- Clade: Embryophytes
- Clade: Tracheophytes
- Clade: Angiosperms
- Clade: Eudicots
- Order: Caryophyllales
- Family: Cactaceae
- Subfamily: Cactoideae
- Genus: Pelecyphora
- Species: P. vivipara

Binomial name
- Pelecyphora vivipara (Nutt.) D.Aquino & Dan.Sánchez

Synonyms
- List: Escobaria vivipara (Nutt.) Buxb.; Cactus radiosus var. neomexicanus (Engelm.) J.M.Coult.; Coryphantha aggregata (Engelm.) Britton & Rose; Coryphantha alversonii (Coult.) Orcutt; Coryphantha alversonii var. exaltissima Wiegand & Backeb.; Coryphantha arizonica (Engelm.) Britton & Rose; Coryphantha bisbeeana Orcutt; Coryphantha fragrans Hester; Coryphantha neomexicana (Engelm.) Britton & Rose; Coryphantha neovivipara (Viv.) Y.Itô; Coryphantha neovivipara var. aggregata (Engelm.) Y.Itô; Coryphantha neovivipara var. arizonica (Engelm.) Y.Itô; Coryphantha neovivipara var. neomexicana (Engelm.) Y.Itô; Coryphantha neovivipara var. radiosa (Engelm.) Y.Itô; Coryphantha radiosa (Engelm.) Rydb.; Coryphantha vivipara (Nutt.) Britton & Rose; Coryphantha vivipara f. sonorensis P.C.Fisch.; Coryphantha vivipara var. aggregata (Engelm.) W.T.Marshall; Coryphantha vivipara var. arizonica (Engelm.) W.T.Marshall; Coryphantha vivipara var. bisbeeana (Orcutt) L.D.Benson; Coryphantha vivipara var. buoflama P.C.Fisch.; Coryphantha vivipara var. kaibabensis P.C.Fisch.; Coryphantha vivipara var. neomexicana (Engelm.) Backeb.; Coryphantha vivipara var. radiosa (Engelm.) Backeb.; Coryphantha vivipara var. rosea (Clokey) L.D.Benson; Escobaria aggregata (Engelm.) Buxb.; Escobaria arizonica (Engelm.) Buxb.; Escobaria bisbeeana (Orcutt) Borg; Escobaria neomexicana (Engelm.) Buxb.; Escobaria oklahomensis (Lahman) Buxb.; Escobaria vivipara var. arizonica (Engelm.) D.R.Hunt; Escobaria vivipara var. bisbeeana (Orcutt) D.R.Hunt; Escobaria vivipara var. buoflama (P.C.Fisch.) N.P.Taylor; Escobaria vivipara var. kaibabensis (P.C.Fisch.) N.P.Taylor; Escobaria vivipara var. neomexicana (Engelm.) Buxb.; Escobaria vivipara var. radiosa (Engelm.) D.R.Hunt; Escobaria vivipara var. rosea (Clokey) D.R.Hunt; Mammillaria arizonica Engelm.; Mammillaria arizonica var. alversonii (J.M. Coult.) Davidson & Moxley; Mammillaria neomexicana A. Nelson; Mammillaria radiosa Engelm.; Mammillaria radiosa var. alversonii (J.M. Coult.) K. Schum.; Mammillaria radiosa var. arizonica (Engelm.) K. Schum.; Mammillaria radiosa var. vivipara (Nutt.) Schelle; Mammillaria vivipara (Nutt.) Haw.; Mammillaria vivipara subsp. radiosa Engelm.; Mammillaria vivipara var. alversonii (J.M. Coult.) L.D. Benson; Mammillaria vivipara var. radiosa Engelm.

= Pelecyphora vivipara =

Species of cactus

Pelecyphora vivipara is a species of cactus known by several common names, including spinystar, viviparous foxtail cactus, pincushion cactus and ball cactus. It is native to North America, where certain varieties can be found from Mexico to Canada. Most of these varieties are limited to the Mojave and Sonoran Deserts. The species epithet "vivipara" was likely a reference to the plants tendency to produce offsets, or "pups", which is known as vivipary.

== Description ==
Pelecyphora vivipara rarely grows individually and usually forms groups. This is a small round cactus growing to a maximum height of about 15 cm (6 in), often remaining smaller and oblong or spherical. It is densely covered in a mat of star-shaped arrays of straight white spines 1 to 2.5 cm (3/8 to 1 in) long. It flowers in yellow, pink, red, or purple blooms 2–5 cm (3/4–2 in) across. Their conspicuous warts are up to 12 mm (1/2 in) long. The often hair-like spines are translucent and shiny. The three to seven uniformly orange or brown colored central spines are spreading and strong. The approximately 16 radiating marginal spines are white.

The flowers are bright pink to purple. They are up to 6 centimeters long and reach a diameter of 5 centimeters. The green, ellipsoid fruits are up to 2.5 centimeters long and 1.5 centimeters in diameter. They are often covered with scales at their tip.

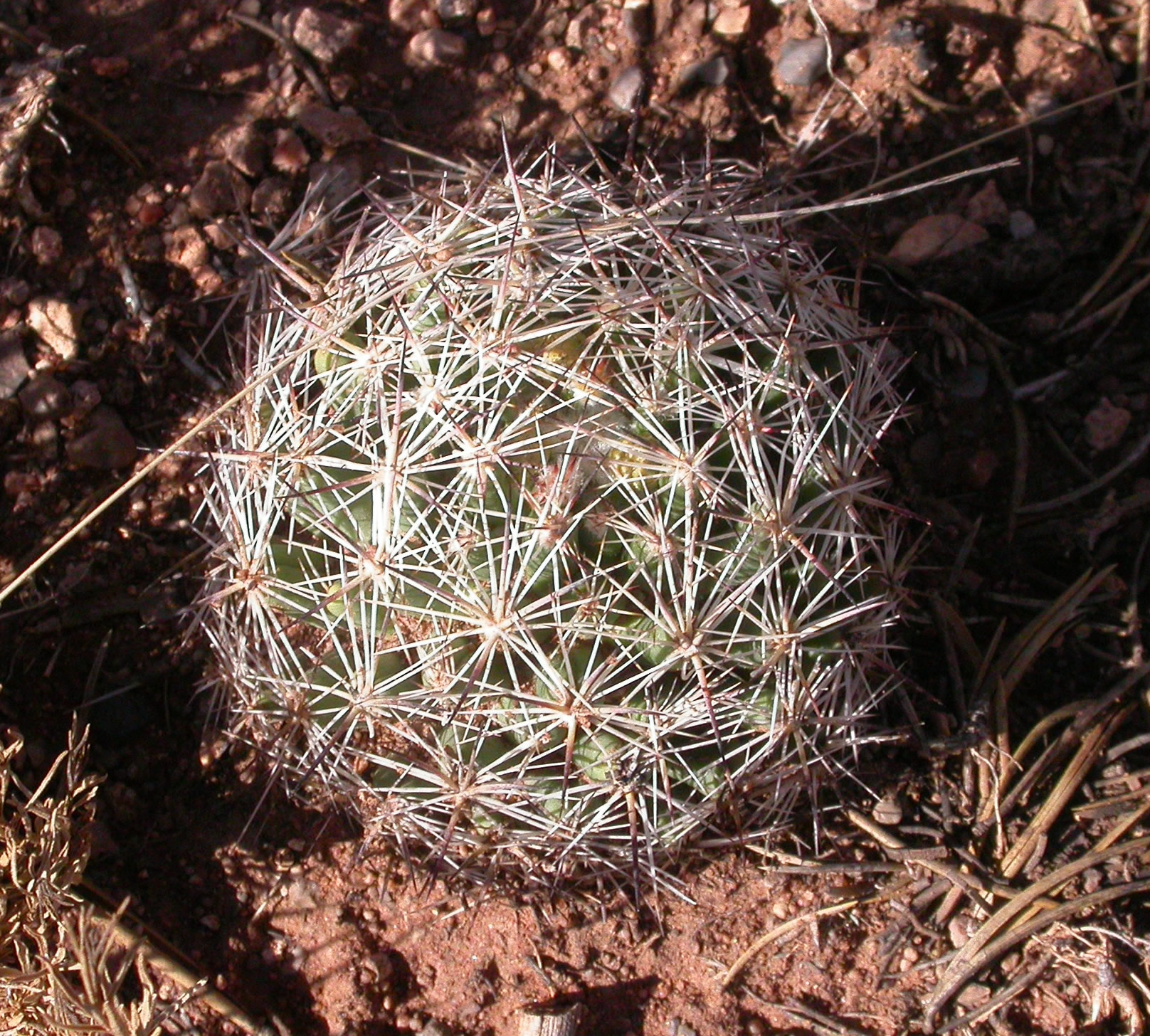
Plant

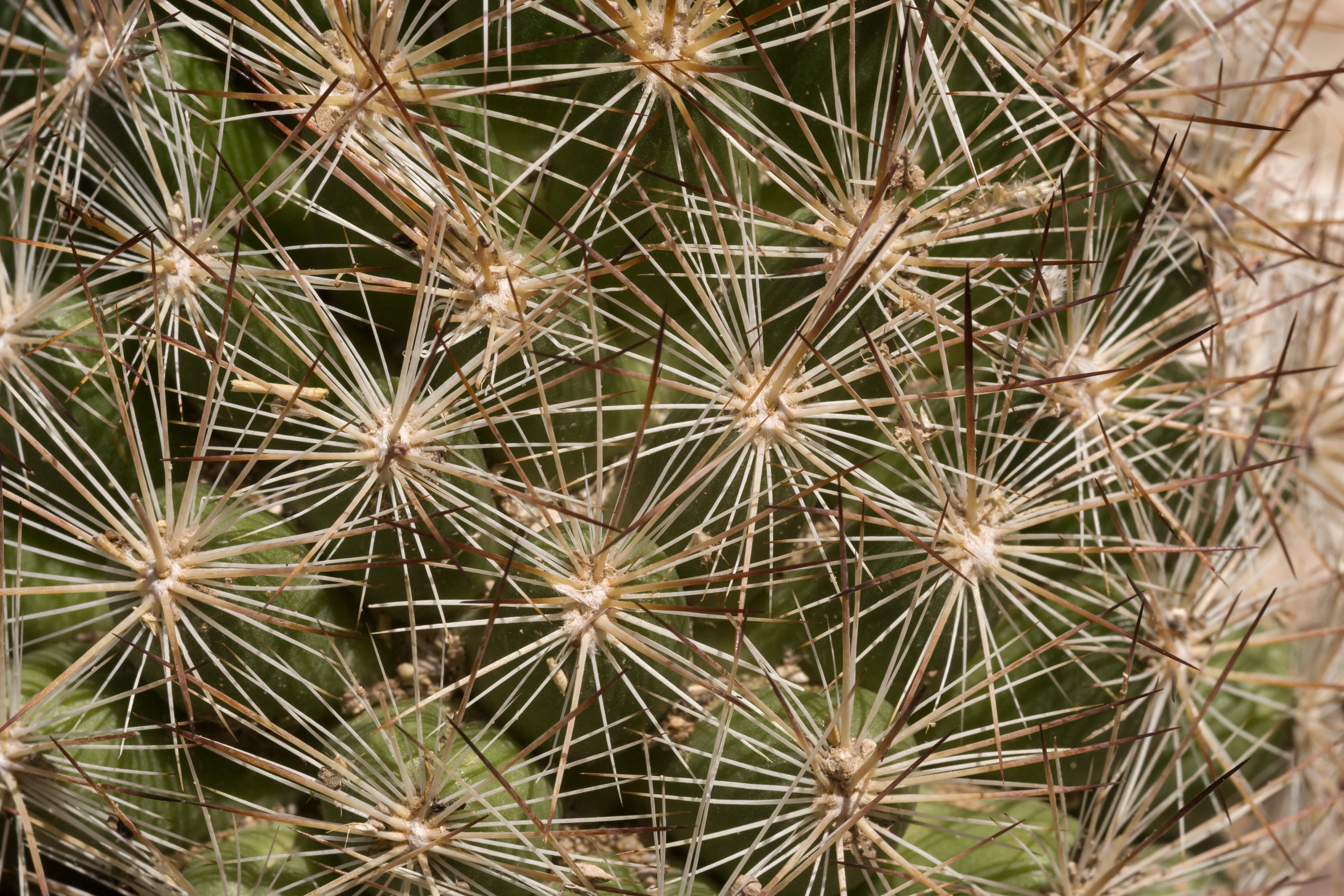
spines

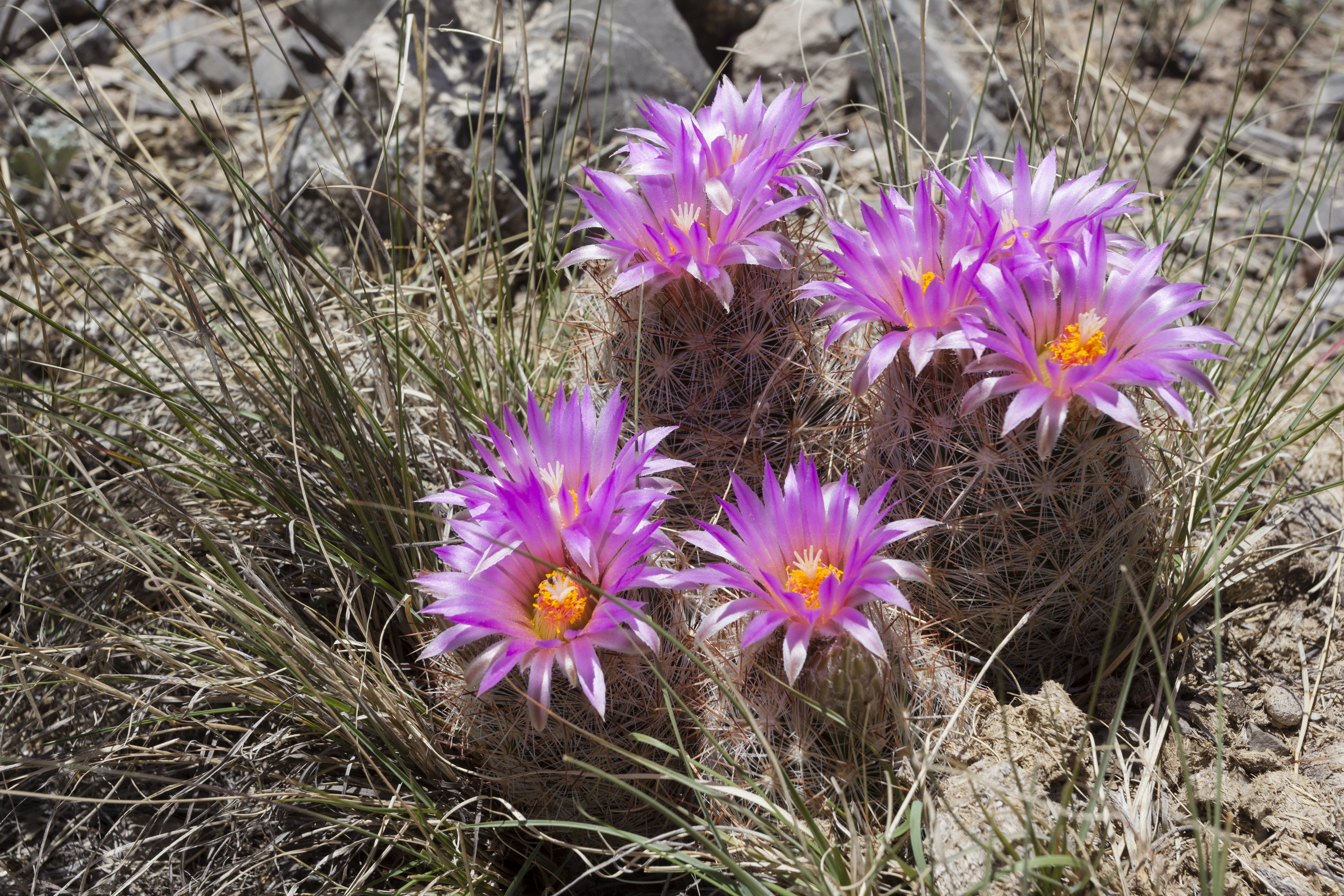
Pelecyphora vivipara in southwestern foothills of Sierra Blanca, north of Cat Mountain, Otero County, New Mexico.

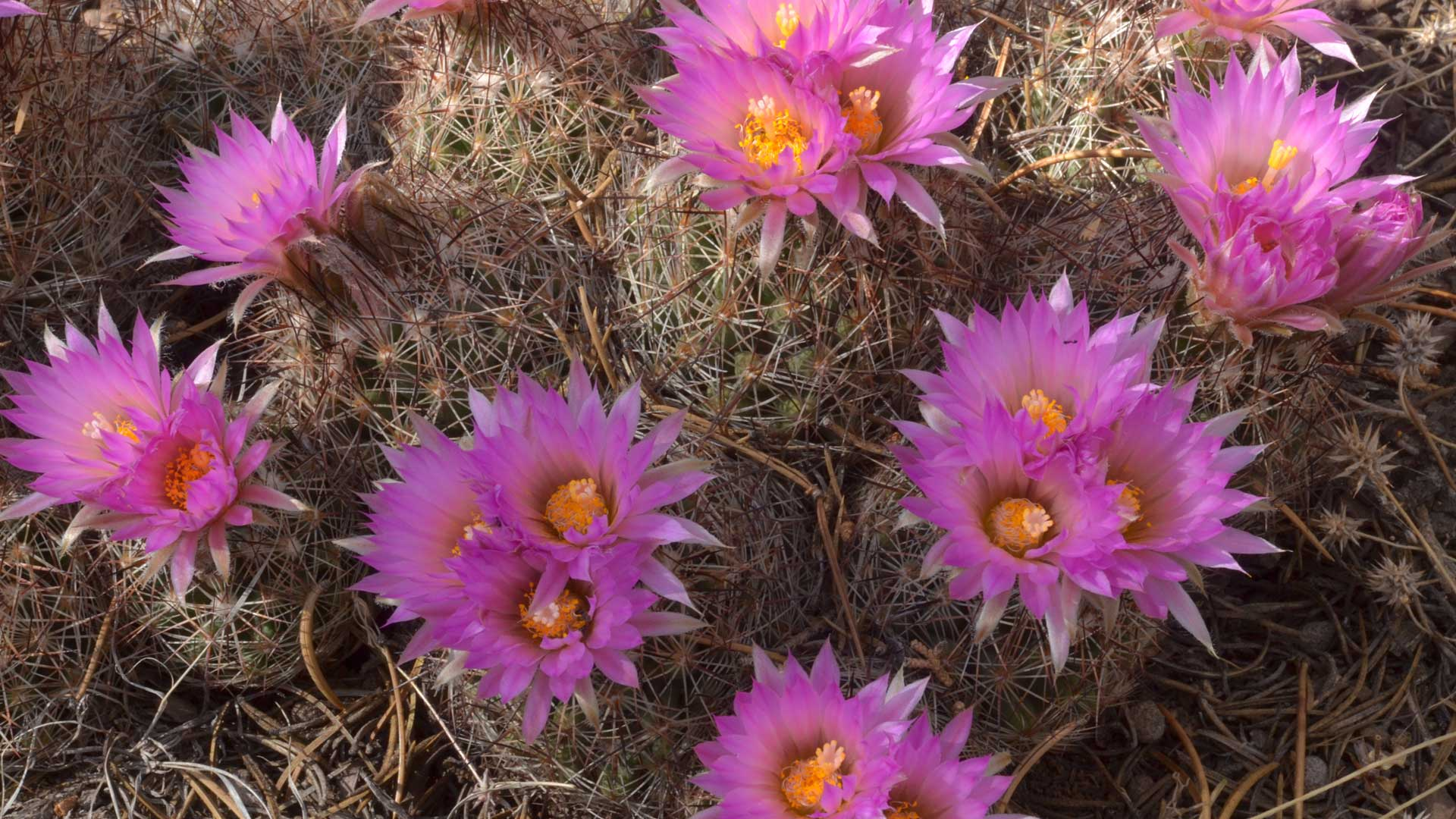
Pelecyphora vivipara blooming in Grand Canyon Village on the South Rim of Grand Canyon National Park

=== Varieties ===
Varieties include:

- Pelecyphora vivipara var. arizonica (Arizona spinystar) – native to the desert southwest of the United States
- Pelecyphora vivipara var. bisbeeana (Bisbee spinystar) – native to Arizona and New Mexico
- Pelecyphora vivipara var. kaibabensis (Kaibab spinystar) – mostly limited to Arizona
- Pelecyphora vivipara var. neomexicana (New Mexico spinystar) – native to New Mexico and Texas
- Pelecyphora vivipara var. vivipara – known as far north as Manitoba

== Distribution ==
The species has a broad range across the western interior of North America, from northern Mexico to the Canadian prairies. Its distribution in the early Holocene era is known to have differed locally from its present range. From pollen core data, a portion of the prehistoric distribution of this species has been mapped; for example in the Late Wisconsin period, Pelecyphora vivipara occurred in the Waterman Mountains (Coconino County) of northern Arizona, (the Waterman Mountains are in SE Arizona), although the species does not occur in this location in the present time.

In the US state of Minnesota, it is listed as a threatened species and is at the most easterly extent of its natural range; it is rare in the state and found in a narrow section of the western part of the state, where it is found growing in crevices and outcroppings of granite. It consists of one population in two counties, that in the past was recorded by Lycurgus Moyer, who found it in 1898, as "quite abundant", but because of habitat loss due to farming and quarrying, its numbers have declined. The remaining plants are also threatened by illegal harvesting by cactus fanciers, who plant it in rock gardens and windowsills.

Notably, Pelecyphora vivipara is one of only four cactus species native to Canada, growing in the southern prairies of Alberta, Saskatchewan and southwestern Manitoba.

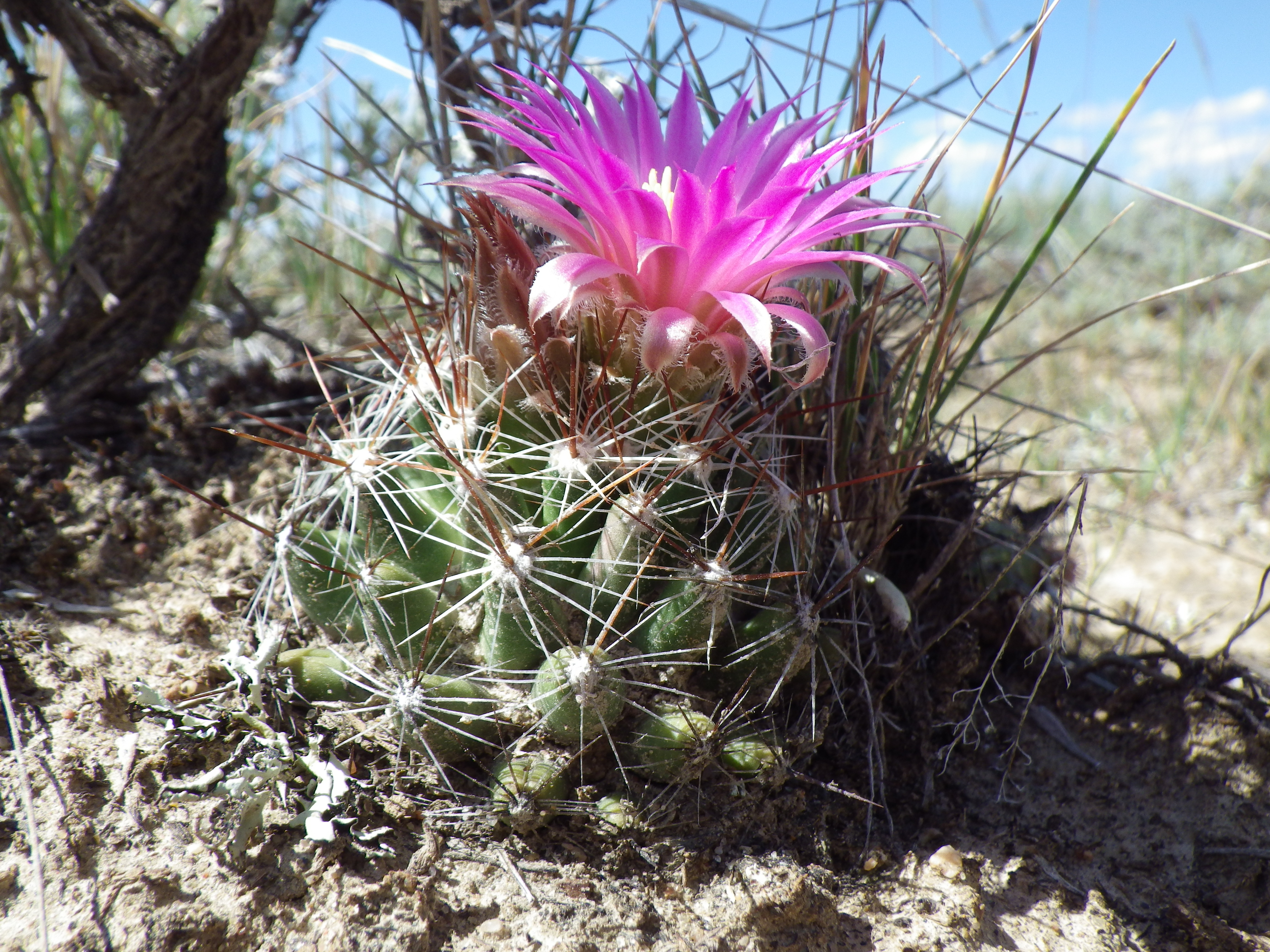
Flowering specimen near Phillips, Montana, USA

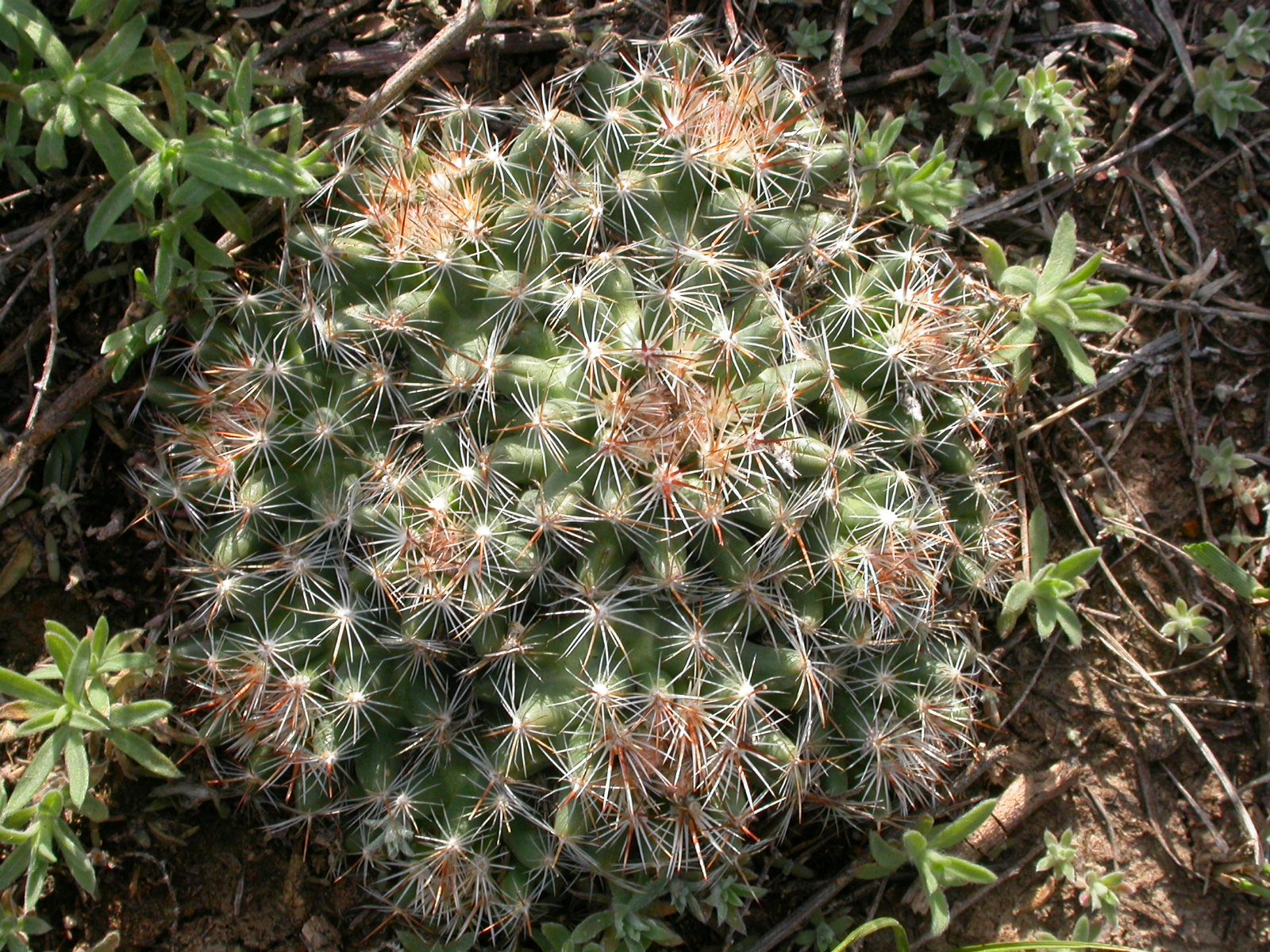
Characteristic reddish spines

== Taxonomy ==
The first description as Cactus viviparus by Thomas Nuttall was published in 1813. The specific epithet vivipara is derived from the Latin word viviparus and means 'living birth'. The reference to the species is unclear. Franz Buxbaum placed the species in the genus Escobaria in 1951. David Aquino & Daniel Sánchez moved the species to Pelecyphora based on phylogenetic studies in 2022. Further nomenclature synonyms are Mammillaria vivipara (Nutt.) Haw. (1819), Echinocactus viviparus (Nutt.) Poselg. (1853), Mammillaria radiosa f. vivipara (Nutt.) Schelle (1907, incorrect name ICBN article 11.4) and Coryphantha vivipara (Nutt.) Britton & Rose (1913).

== Gallery ==
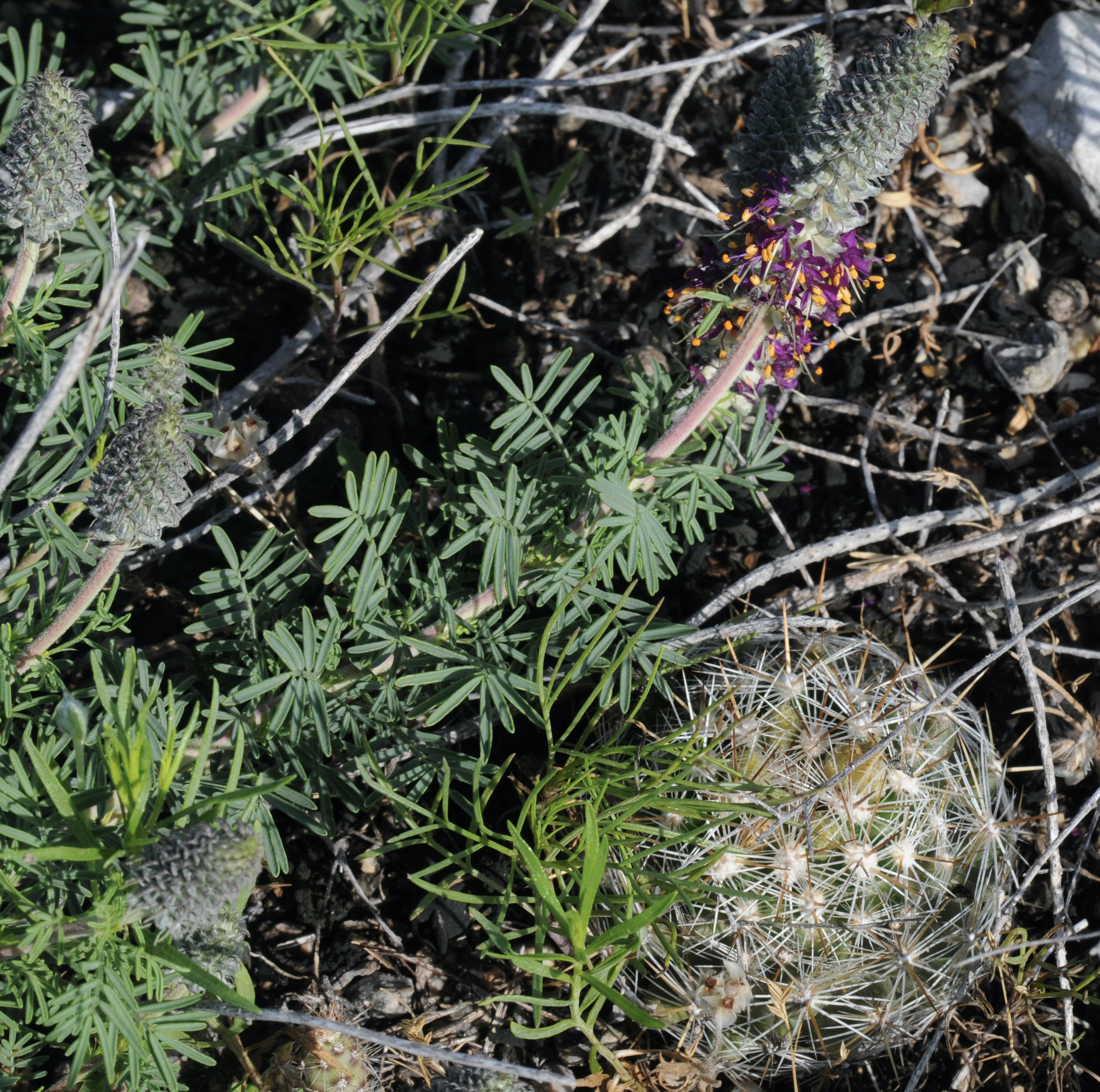
Dalea reverchonii and Escobaria vivipara

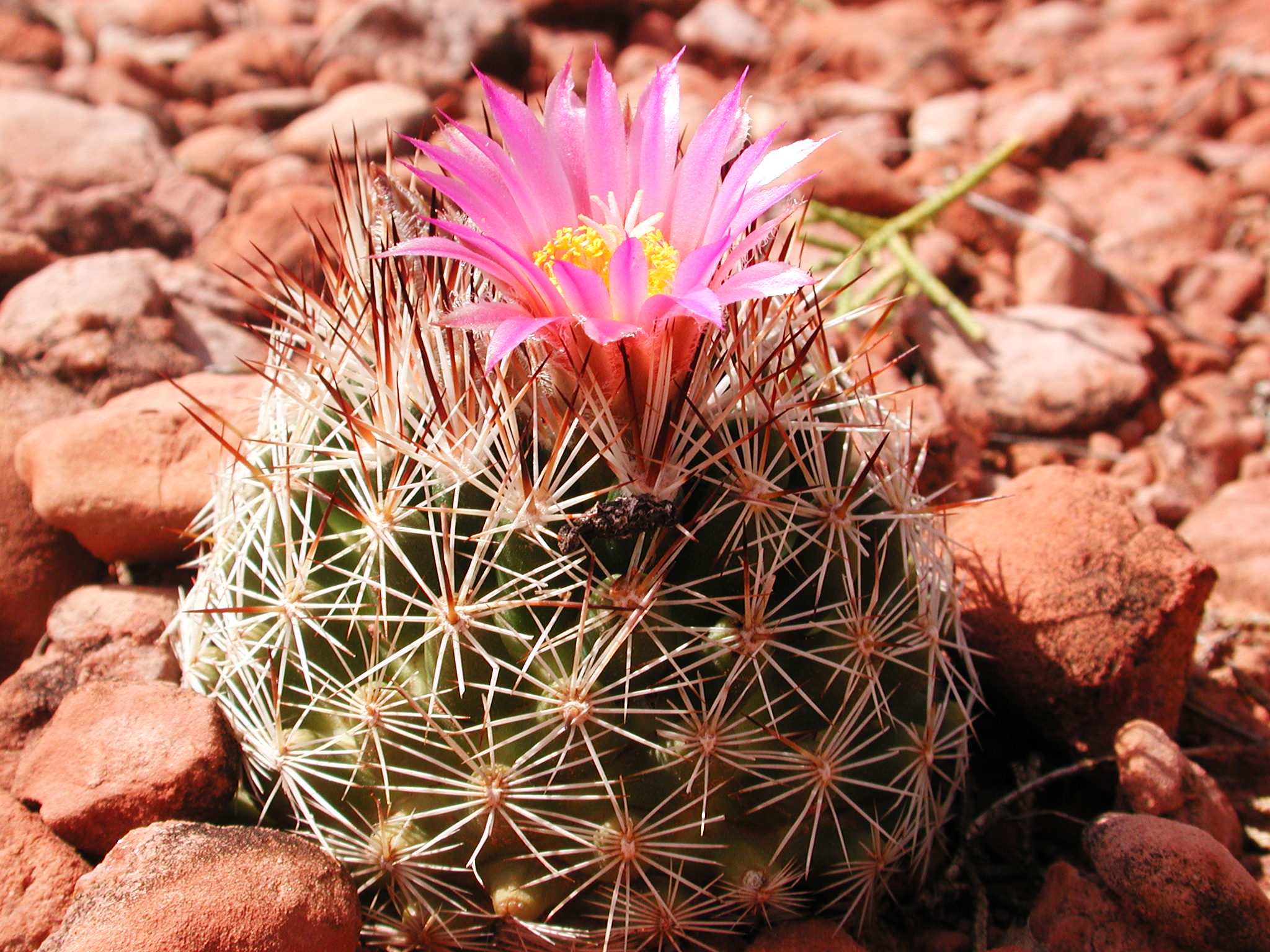

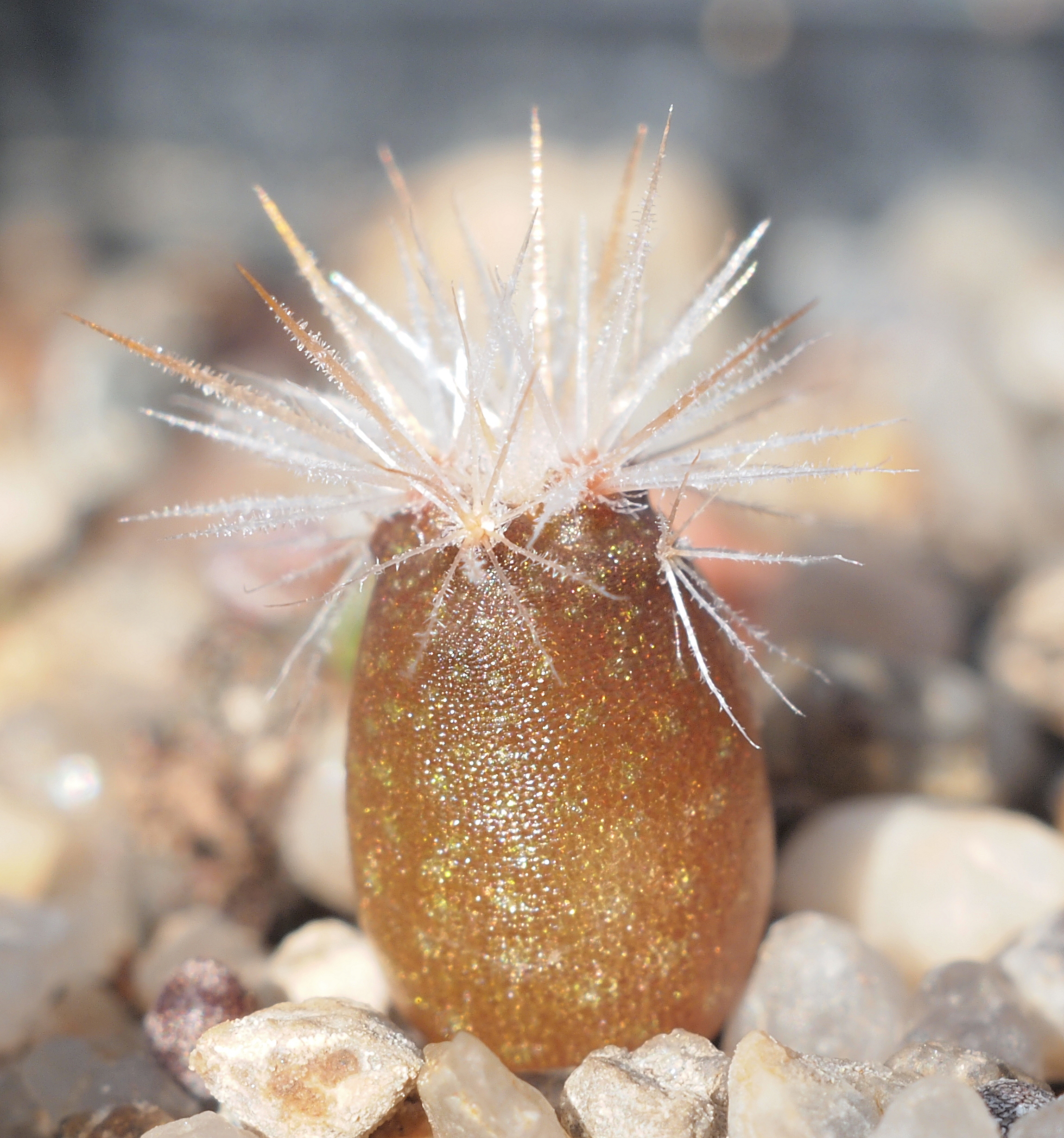

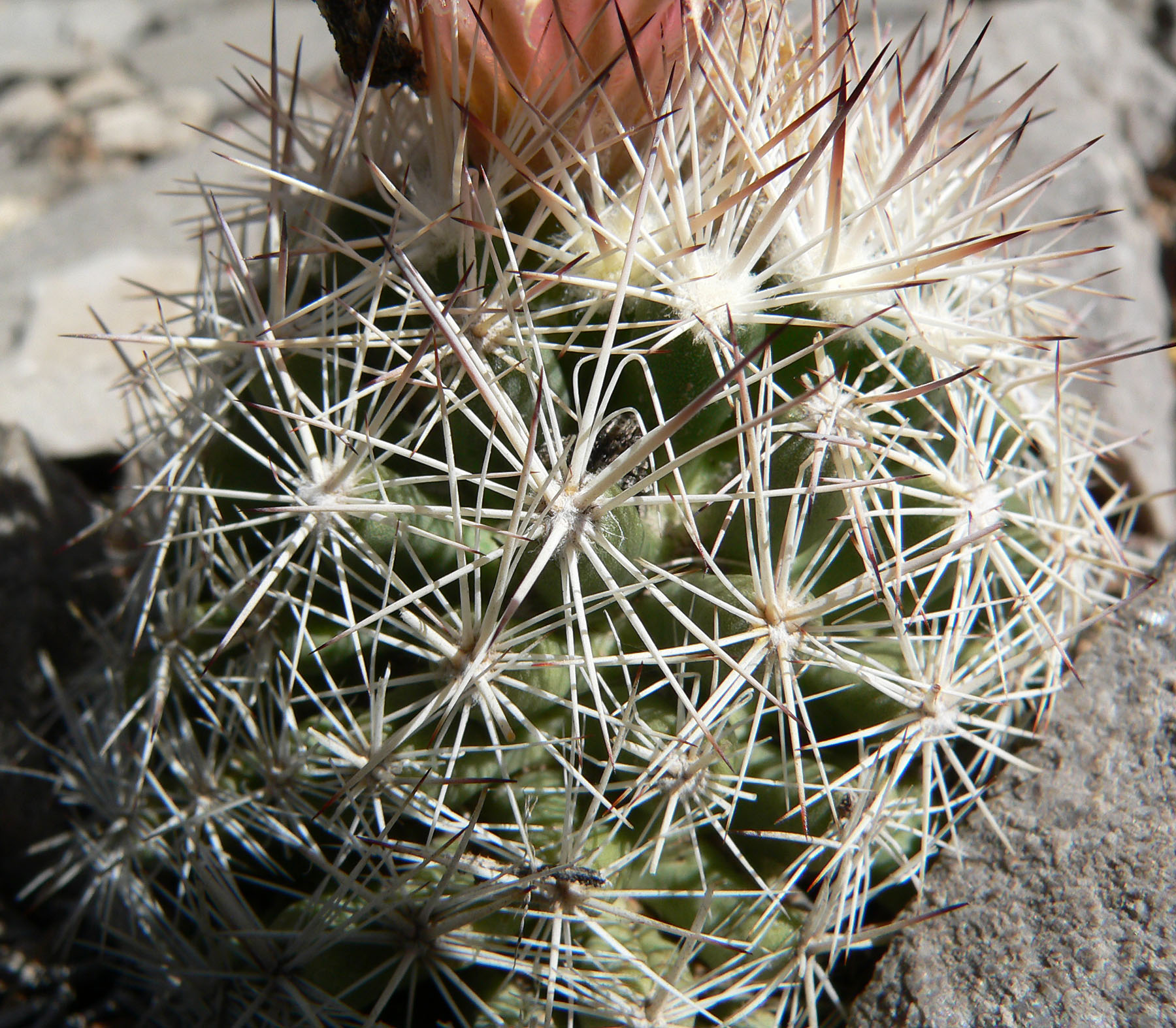

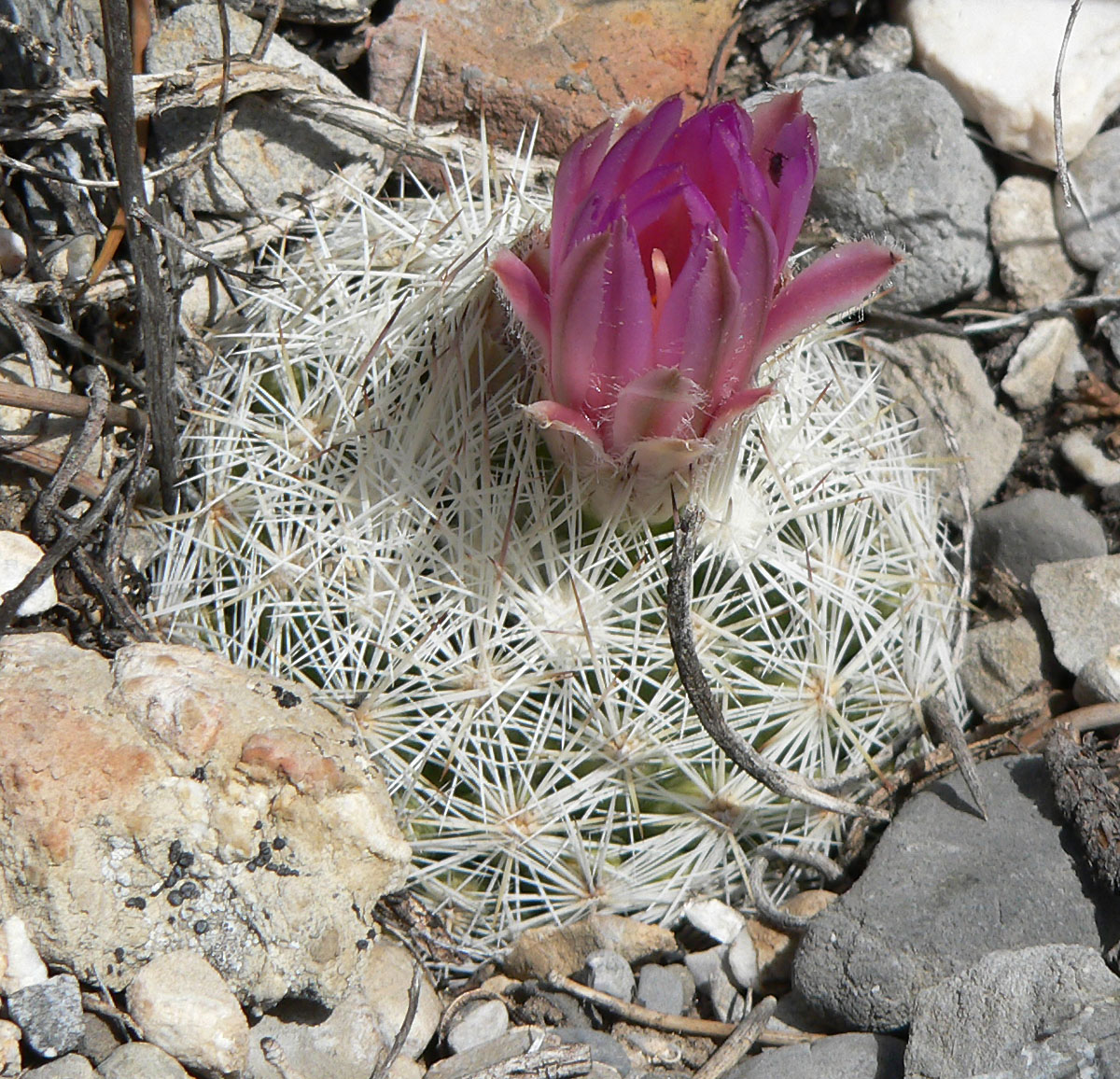
