= Texas sage =

Texas sage may refer to:

- Leucophyllum frutescens, an evergreen shrub in the figwort family, native to Texas, that is not a true sage
- Salvia coccinea, blood sage
- Salvia texana, a Salvia that is also native to Texas
