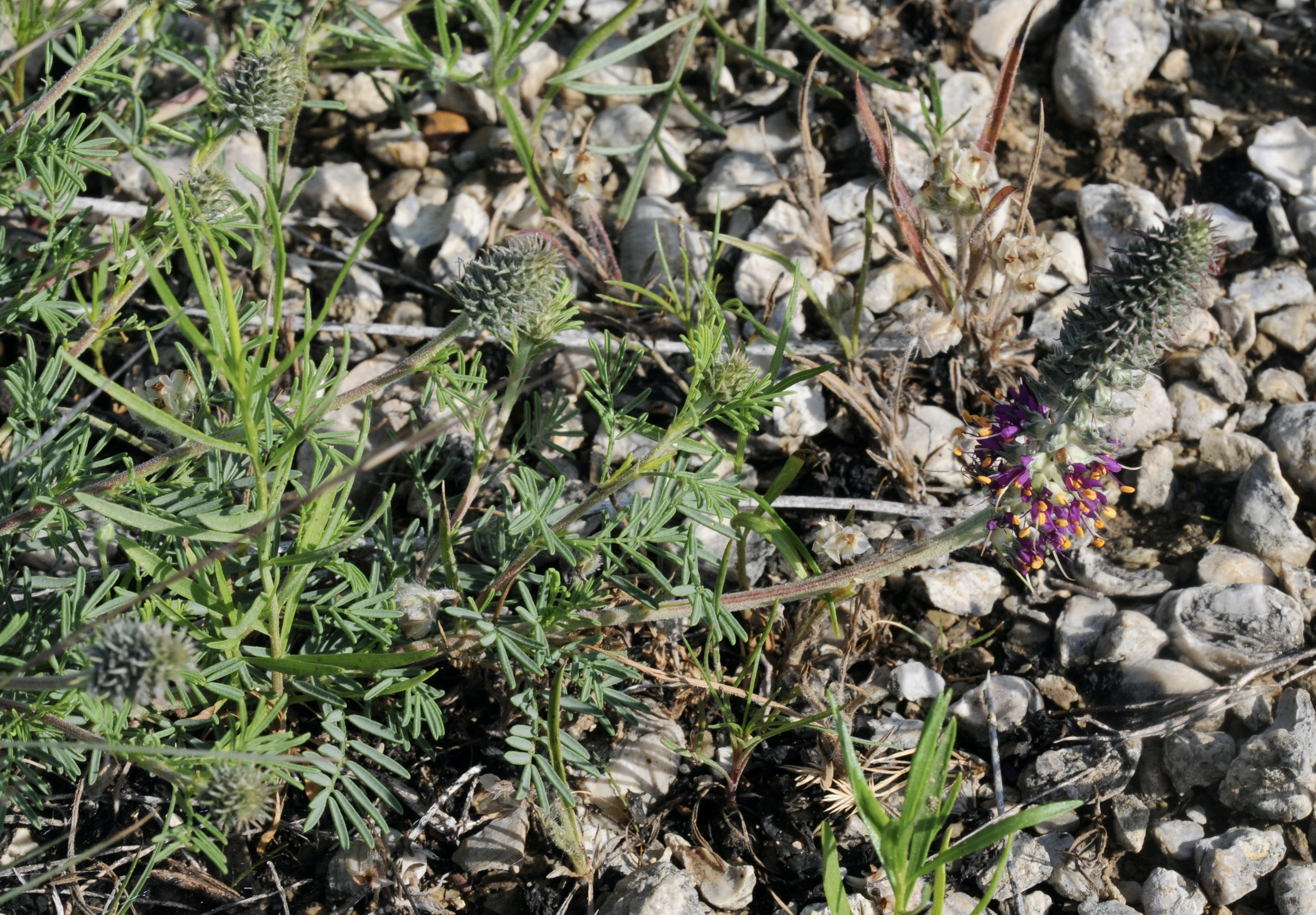

Conservation status
- Imperiled (NatureServe)

Scientific classification
- Kingdom: Plantae
- Clade: Embryophytes
- Clade: Tracheophytes
- Clade: Angiosperms
- Clade: Eudicots
- Clade: Rosids
- Order: Fabales
- Family: Fabaceae
- Subfamily: Faboideae
- Genus: Dalea
- Species: D. reverchonii

Binomial name
- Dalea reverchonii (S.Watson) Shinners

= Dalea reverchonii =

Species of legume

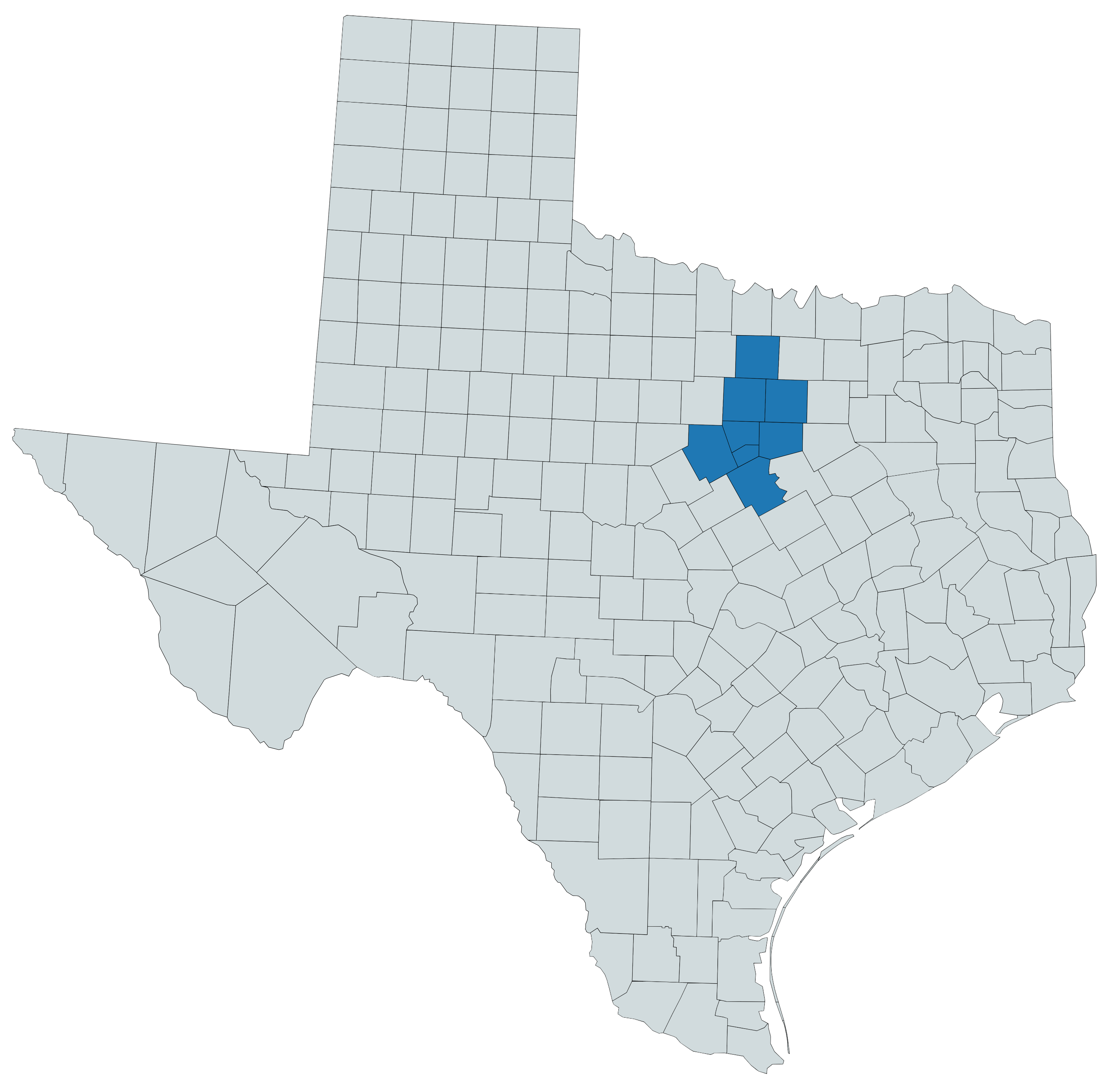
Range of Dalea reverchonii

Dalea reverchonii is a species of flowering plant in the legume family known by the common name Comanche Peak prairie-clover. It is endemic to Texas in the United States, where it is known from Bosque, Erath, Hood, Johnson, Parker, Somervell, Tarrant, and Wise counties. This species was first collected by Julien Reverchon at the top of Comanche Peak. As of 2015 the species still grows there.

This perennial herb forms a mat-like rosette with smooth leaves each divided into several leaflets. It blooms in spikes of pink or purplish flowers in May and June.

This plant grows on grassland terrain and in openings in oak woodland dominated by post oak (Quercus stellata). It may grow on barren sites with little vegetation. The substrate is clay over limestone. Associated plants include Aristida spp., Bouteloua rigidiseta, Arenaria stricta, Dalea aurea, D. enneandra, D. tenuis, Evolvulus nuttallianus, Hedeoma drummondii, Hedyotis nigricans, Heliotropium tenellum, Indigofera miniata var. leptosepala, Paronychia virginica, Pediomelum reverchonii, Salvia texana, and Thelesperma filifolium.

There are 69 populations as of 2013.
