= Julien Reverchon =

French botanist (1837–1905)

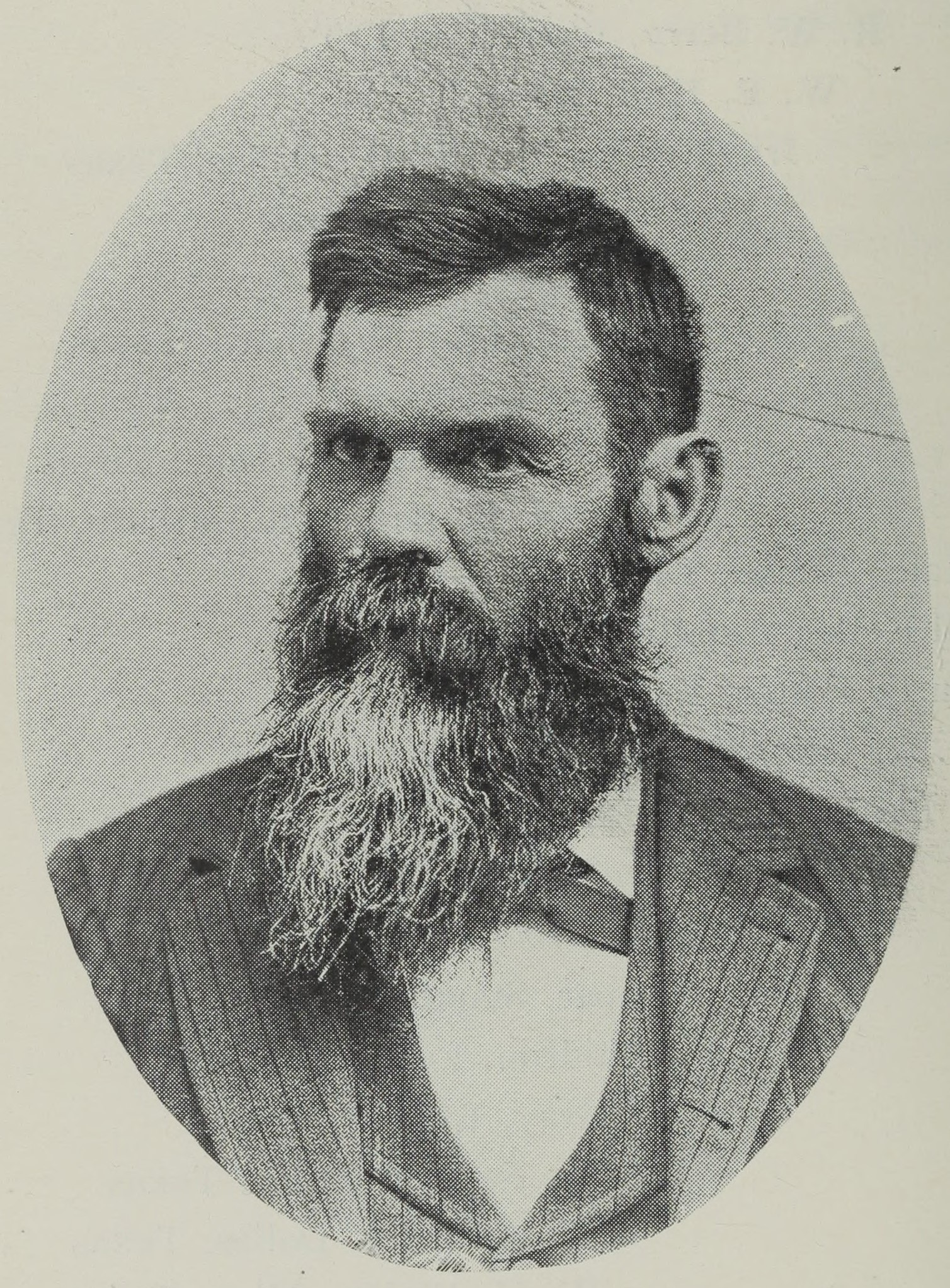
- Reverchon c. 1903–04
- Born: Julien Reverchon; August 3, 1837; Diémoz, France
- Died: December 30, 1905 (aged 68); Dallas, Texas, United States
- Burial place: La Réunion Cemetery
- Occupation: Botany

Julien Reverchon (August 3, 1837 – December 30, 1905) was a French botanist and naturalist.

== Biography ==
=== Childhood ===
Reverchon was born on August 3, 1837, in Diémoz, France, to Jacques Maximilien and Florine (Pete) Reverchon. He was the brother of Elisée Reverchon and Paul-Alphonse Reverchon.

During his youth, Reverchon had already begun to display an interest in the natural world, and together with his brother Elisée amassed a collection of nearly 2,000 species of plants during his childhood. This devotion to nature laid the foundation for the career he would pursue later in life.

=== Arrival in the United States ===
At the age of 19, Julien and his father emigrated from France to join Fourierist Victor Prosper Considerant's colony at La Réunion in Dallas County, Texas; his older brothers Elisée and Paul-Alphonse remained behind in France.

The Reverchons arrived at La Réunion in December 1856, shortly before the formal dissolution of the colony. Jacques received a plot of land at the southeastern edge of the colony in exchange for their shares in the failed enterprise. The family established a farm on the site, and Reverchon began studying the local flora.

=== Family life and career ===
Reverchon married Marie Henri on July 24, 1864. They had two sons, Maximilien and Michel, born in 1865 and 1866 respectively, who would both die as youths of typhoid fever in 1884.

After abandoning botany for a few years, Reverchon resumed collecting plants in 1869, when he went on an expedition with fellow naturalist Jacob Boll to collect fossils in West Texas. With subsequent collections, he contributed to the production of noted floras by Asa Gray and Charles Sprague Sargent, and the enrichment of many American collections. Reverchon's plant specimens were distributed by Allen Hiram Curtiss in his exsiccata-like series North American Plants.

=== Later life and death ===
In his later years, Reverchon taught botany at the Baylor University College of Medicine, at the time located in Dallas.

On July 6, 1905, Reverchon was struck by a train, fracturing his arm and badly bruising his back, while examining some bugs near a railroad track in Greenville, Texas. Reverchon never recovered from his injuries, and died at his adopted son Robert Freeman's home in Eagle Ford on December 30th. He was 68 years old.

At the time of his death, his home, known as the "Rose Cottage", contained a rich herbarium with more than 2,600 different species and 20,000 specimens.

== Legacy ==
Dalea reverchonii was first documented by Reverchon. Hedeoma reverchonii, Muhlenbergia reverchonii, Tradescantia reverchonii, and Yucca reverchonii are named in his honor.

Reverchon's botanical collection is widely considered the most elaborate of his time. It was donated to the Missouri Botanical Garden in St. Louis upon his death.

The city of Dallas named Reverchon Park in his honor. In 2012, artist Kevin Obregón collaborated with the Friends of Reverchon Park, a nonprofit organization, to create a giant paper-mâché puppet of Julien Reverchon for Bridge-O-Rama's Parade of Giants, celebrating the opening of the Margaret Hunt Hill Bridge. In 2013, the puppet would be displayed at Midtown ARTwalk in the Valley View Center shopping mall.
