= Elisée Reverchon =

Elisée Reverchon (1834, Oullins - 1914, Miribel) was a French botanical collector. His brothers, Julien (1837-1905) and Paul-Alphonse (1833-1907), were also involved in the field of botany.

A resident of Bollène, he engaged in botanical missions to southeastern France (1867-1877), Corsica (1878-1894), Sardinia (1881–82) and Algeria (1881–82). He also conducted botanical investigations in Spain from 1887 and 1906 that are considered to be his most important work. Reverchon edited more than twenty exsiccatae and sold exsiccata-like series of herbarium specimens, among others Plantes de la Corse (1878–94) and Plantes d’Espagne (1892–1906). During his later years, he lived in Lyon.

Some plants with the specific epithet of reverchonii are named in his honor.

== Books written about Elisée Reverchon ==
- Excursions botaniques de M. Elisée Reverchon, Le Mans : Institut de bibliographie, (1905-1907) by Joseph Hervier.
- La Sierra de Cazorla et les Excursions d'Elisée Reverchon, Genève : Société botanique de Genève, (1929) by C C Lacaita.
