= Floretta Allen Curtiss =

American botanist and phycologist (1822–1899)

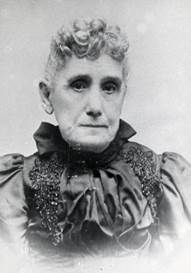
- Floretta Allen Curtiss in 1895
- Born: 1 December 1822; New York State, US
- Died: 3 March 1899 (aged 76); Florida, US
- Resting place: Hillside Memorial Cemetery and Park, Central Square, Oswego County, New York, USA
- Occupation: Phycologist
- Notable work: "Algæ Curtissianæ" - a collection of marine algae in eight volumes
- Spouse: Gaston G. Curtiss
- Children: Allen Hiram Curtiss

Signature
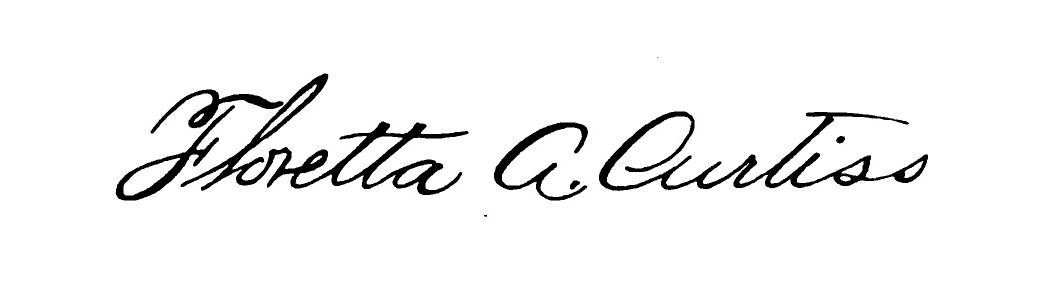

Floretta Allen Curtiss (1 December 1822 – 3 March 1899) was an American phycologist, whose significant collection of algae specimens was ultimately donated to the United States National Herbarium. She has been described as a "trailblazer", and as "Florida's most indefatigable phycologist."

== Life ==
Floretta Anna Allen was born in a log cabin in New York, in what is now the village of Central Square, the daughter of Solomon Allen and Lucy (née Godspeed). As a child, she was drawn to nature, taking a special interest in the family's flower garden. Allen was educated in Rome, New York and Ann Arbor, Michigan, where she was first exposed to botany as an area of study under the influence of a tutor. Back at home, and under the strict guidance of her mother, Allen met Gaston G. Curtiss. The pair became engaged, and were married on 7 July 1842.

In his biographical sketch, Curtiss' son (Allen Hiram, born 1845) described the early years of his mother's marriage as "full of trouble". Following his birth, she became ill with tuberculosis. Her two brothers died, and she lost her second child in early infancy.

During the Civil War, the family moved to Alexandria, Virginia, where Curtiss befriended many soldiers and took to walking. After the war, they purchased a farm near Lynchburg. Gaston G. Curtiss died on 16 November 1862, and Floretta Curtiss subsequently joined her son, by then living in Florida.

== Phycology ==
It was in Florida that Curtiss became interested in algae, possibly initially as a result of her beach-combing. In collecting and mounting specimens, Allen H. Curtiss wrote:

she found not only a species of artwork, but a nature study requiring close mental application. There is probably no other order of plants that presents to a student so many doubtful and puzzling forms, and it was through her persistent study of such forms that my mother made so many additions to the knowledge of algae.

Curtiss began to correspond with botanist William Gilson Farlow, and Swedish botanist and phycologist Jacob Georg Agardh. She accompanied her son on expeditions to collect algae, during which she engaged others in collecting who would later send her specimens at home. "Her interest," A. H. Curtiss wrote, "centered in Florida algae, in adding new species and better specimens to her collection, and, above all, in discovering species or varieties new to science or not reported from this country." Among those Curtiss corresponded with, and who sent specimens, were Mary Ann Booth and Charles Lewis Anderson, as well as botanists from abroad.

In 1879, she discovered a species of red algae later named Gracilaria curtissiae.

== Death and legacy ==
Floretta Allen Curtiss died on 3 March 1899, and was buried at Hillside Memorial Cemetery and Park, Oswego County, New York.

This significant herbarium, known as Algae Curtissianae, was later bound into eight folio volumes by her son and donated to the United States National Herbarium. To accompany the donation, A.H. Curtiss wrote a short biography of his mother, published as Mrs. Floretta A. Curtiss: a biographical sketch by her son (1899). Charles Edwin Bessey wrote that "Science owes her a debt of gratitude for the years of painstaking labor which she gave to the gathering and preservation of specimens, which have enriched the botanical collections of the World's great herbaria."

In 1996, the Phycological Newsletter named Curtiss a 'trailblazer' in the field. Michael J. Wynne wrote:

It is appropriate to pay homage to Floretta Allen Curtiss, an adventurous lady who although never publishing a single paper on algae, stands out as a genuine "trailblazer." Her impact on phycology is based on her zeal for collecting and her sharing material with professional phycologists of the day. She was not a mere petticoated wader as was so common in this Victorian period but rather was one sturdy field botanist, who devoted the last two decades of her life to her favorite pursuit, namely, the study of marine algae.
