= Allen Hiram Curtiss =

American botanist (1845–1907)

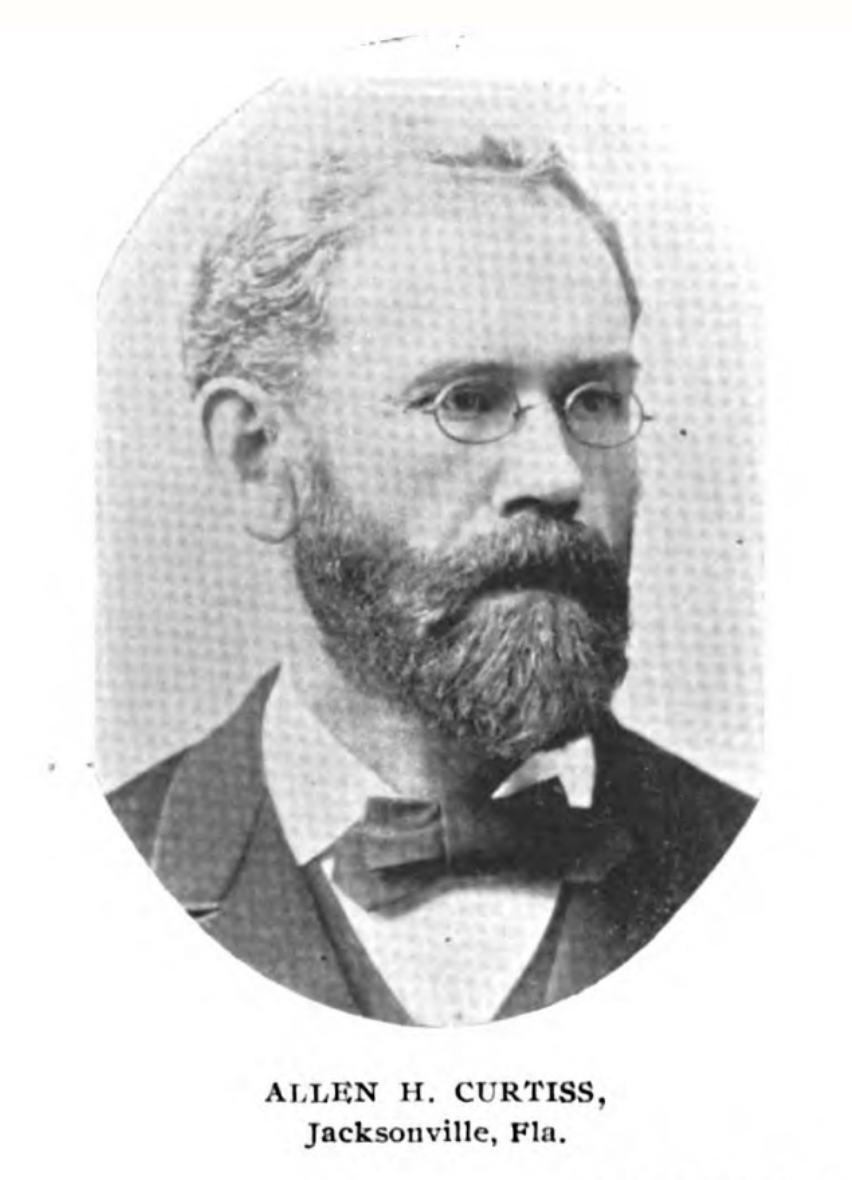
- Born: c. 1845
- Died: 1907
- Burial place: Hillside Memorial Cemetery and Park, Central Square, Oswego County, New York, USA
- Occupation: Botanist
- Mother: Floretta Allen Curtiss

Allen Hiram Curtiss (c. 1845–1907) was an American botanist. He may have been the first professional botanist to reside in Florida. His work included the discovery of fern species at the Pineola Grotto. He collected many specimens and was an author of botanical books. Curtiss exchanged plant specimens with other plant collectors like William Henry Harvey and Julien Reverchon and is known as editor of four exsiccata-like series, selling and distributing plant material with printed labels, among others under the titles North American Plants and West Indian Plants. The Florida Agricultural Experiment Station (established in 1888 as a division of the Florida College of Agriculture at Lake City), employed Curtiss for a brief tenure and several collections at the University of Florida Herbarium are named for him. Several species are named for him including Calamagrostis curtissii and Polygala curtissii.

His mother, Floretta Allen Curtiss was a keen phycologist, whose biographical sketch Allen H. Curtiss published in 1899.

1877 list of plants collected and distributed by Curtiss (readable pdf)
