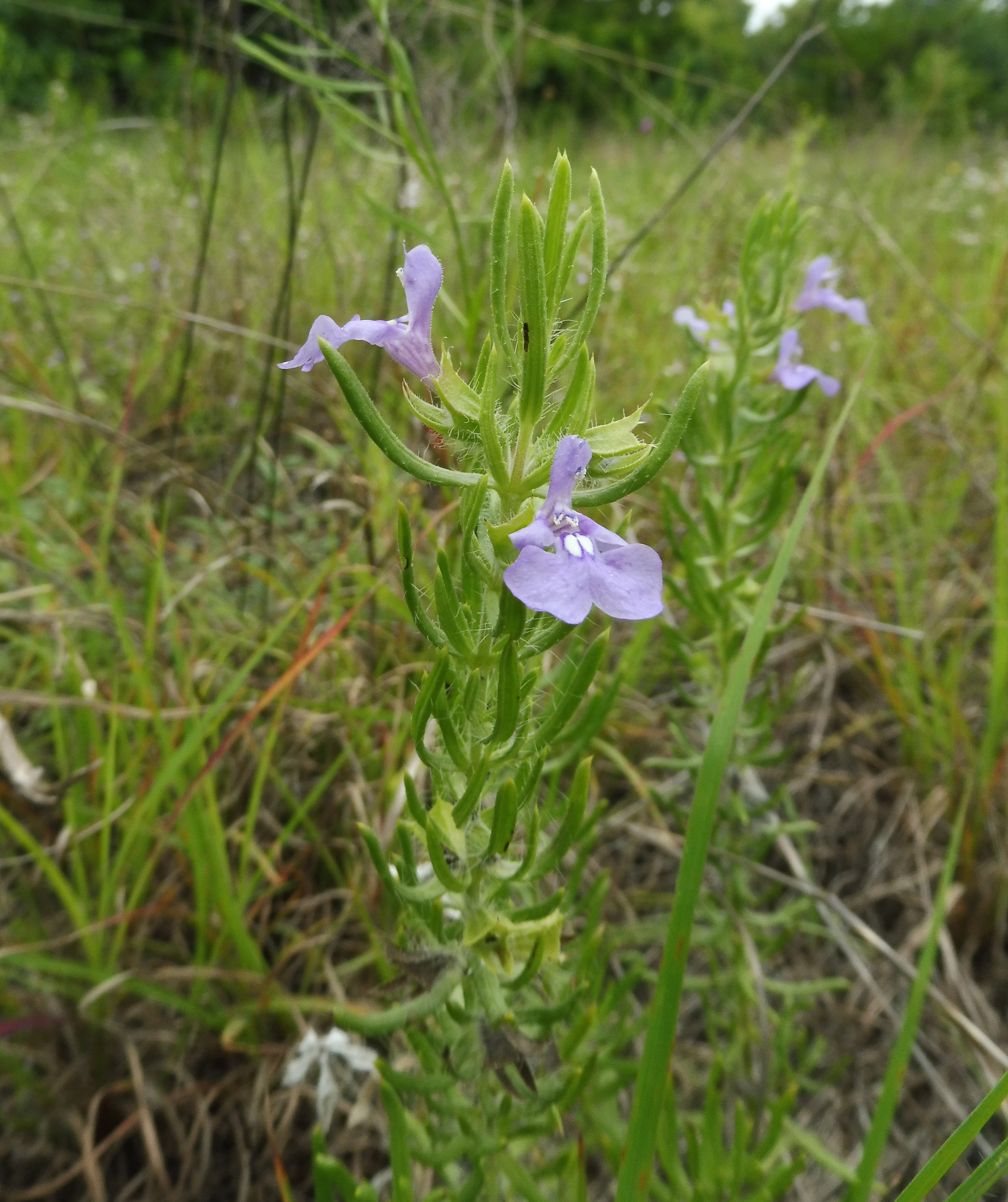

Scientific classification
- Kingdom: Plantae
- Clade: Tracheophytes
- Clade: Angiosperms
- Clade: Eudicots
- Clade: Asterids
- Order: Lamiales
- Family: Lamiaceae
- Genus: Salvia
- Species: S. texana

Binomial name
- Salvia texana (Scheele) Torr.

= Salvia texana =

Species of flowering plant

Salvia texana, commonly called Texas sage, is a species of flowering plant in the mint family (Lamiaceae). It is native to North America, where it is found in northern Mexico, and in the U.S. states of Texas and New Mexico. Its natural habitat is dry areas on limestone soils, in prairies or over rock outcrops.

It is an herbaceous perennial that grows 1 to 1.5 ft (0.30 to 0.46 m) tall. It has with hairy lanceolate-oblanceolate leaves. The flowers are purple-blue. It resembles Salvia engelmannii in appearance, but has a longer bloom period, smaller and darker flowers, and unopened green buds at the top of the plant.
