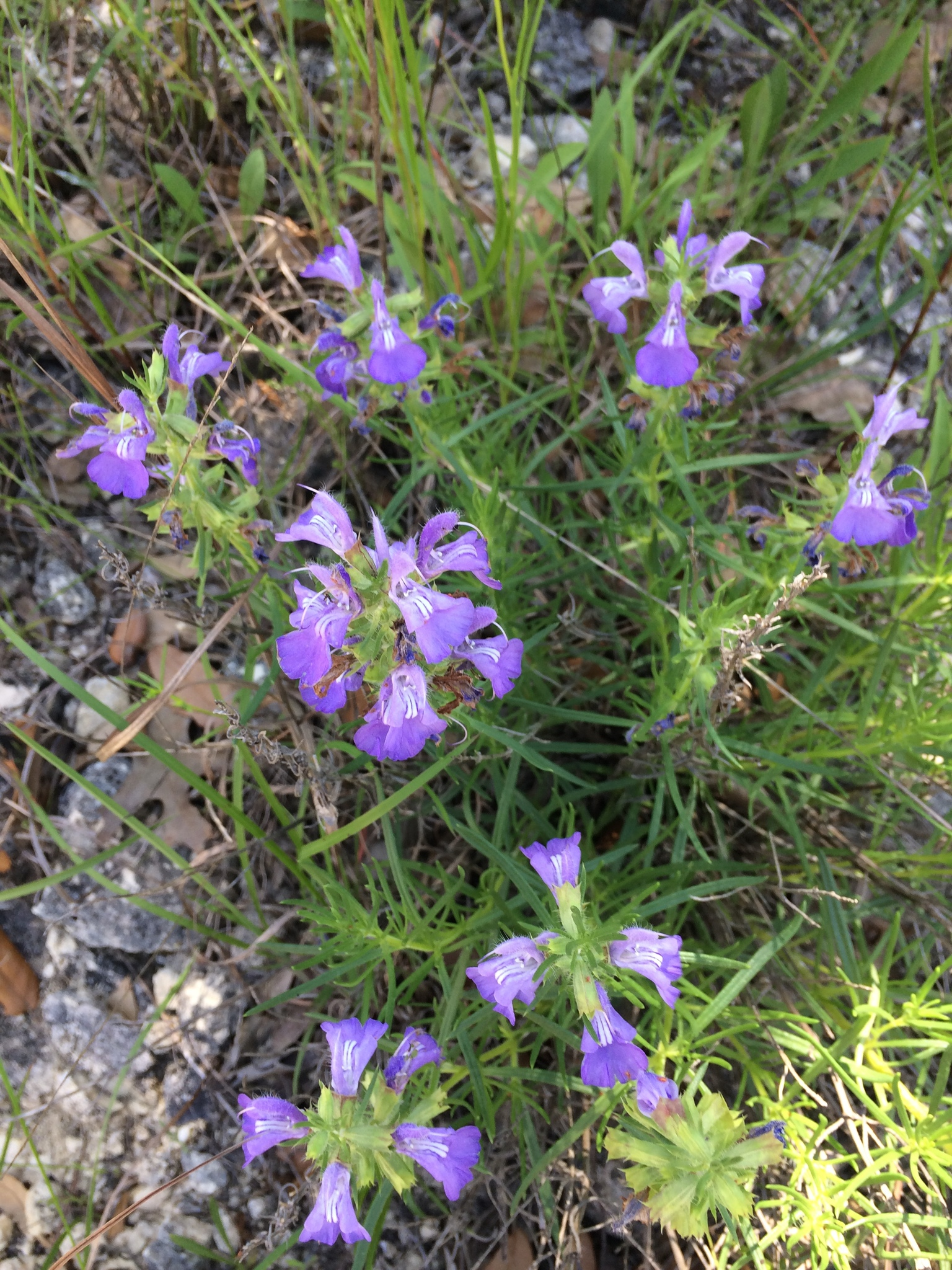

Scientific classification
- Kingdom: Plantae
- Clade: Tracheophytes
- Clade: Angiosperms
- Clade: Eudicots
- Clade: Asterids
- Order: Lamiales
- Family: Lamiaceae
- Genus: Salvia
- Species: S. engelmannii

Binomial name
- Salvia engelmannii A.Gray

= Salvia engelmannii =

Species of flowering plant

Salvia engelmannii (Engelmann's sage, Engelmann's salvia) is a herbaceous perennial that is endemic to the limestone hills of central Texas. Salvia engelmannii forms a mound 1 to 1.5 ft (0.30 to 0.46 m) tall with velvety leaves. The flowers are pale lavender, growing on 4 to 6 in (10 to 15 cm) spikes.
