= Diémoz =

- Commune
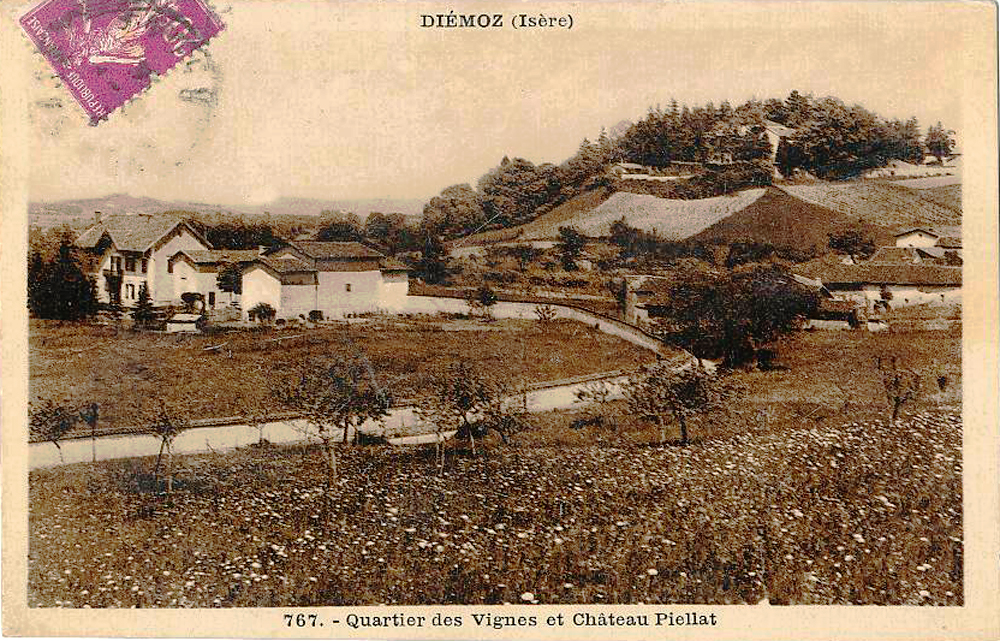
- Diemoz in the early 20th century
- Location of Diémoz
- Location within France Location within Auvergne-Rhône-Alpes
- Coordinates: 45°35′23″N 5°05′41″E
- Country: France
- Region: Auvergne-Rhône-Alpes
- Department: Isère
- Arrondissement: Vienne
- Canton: La Verpillière
- Intercommunality: Collines Isère Nord Communauté

Government
  - Mayor (2020–2026): Christian Rey
- Area^{1}: 13.72 km^{2} (5.30 sq mi)
- Highest elevation: 423 m (1,388 ft)
- Lowest elevation: 287 m (942 ft)
- Population (2023): 2,947
  - Density: 214.8/km^{2} (556.3/sq mi)
- Time zone: UTC+01:00 (CET)
  - Summer (DST): UTC+02:00 (CEST)
- INSEE/Postal code: 38144 /38790
- ^{1} French Land Register data, which excludes lakes, ponds, glaciers > 1 km^{2} (0.386 sq mi or 247 acres) and river estuaries.

Diémoz (French pronunciation: [djemoz]) is a commune in the Isère department in southeastern France.

== Toponymy ==
As with many polysyllabic Arpitan toponyms or anthroponyms, the final -x marks oxytonic stress (on the last syllable), whereas the final -z indicates paroxytonic stress (on the penultimate syllable) and should not be pronounced, although in French it is often mispronounced due to hypercorrection.

== Population ==
Historical population

Year	Pop.	±% p.a.
1793	342	—
1800	563	+7.38%
1806	714	+4.04%
1821	712	−0.02%
1831	733	+0.29%
1836	749	+0.43%
1841	783	+0.89%
1846	770	−0.33%
1851	895	+3.05%
1856	825	−1.62%
1861	811	−0.34%
1866	747	−1.63%
1872	775	+0.62%
1876	646	−4.45%
1881	671	+0.76%
1886	640	−0.94%
1891	602	−1.22%
1896	571	−1.05%
1901	549	−0.78%

Year	Pop.	±% p.a.
1906	559	+0.36%
1911	526	−1.21%
1921	461	−1.31%
1926	446	−0.66%
1931	415	−1.43%
1936	499	+3.76%
1946	540	+0.79%
1954	549	+0.21%
1962	583	+0.75%
1968	679	+2.57%
1975	974	+5.29%
1982	1,510	+6.46%
1990	1,848	+2.56%
1999	2,231	+2.11%
2007	2,567	+1.77%
2012	2,664	+0.74%
2017	2,722	+0.43%
2023	2,947	+1.33%

Source: EHESS and INSEE (1968-2023)

== Twin towns – sister cities ==
Diémoz is twinned with:

- Castelnuovo Belbo, Italy (1970)

== See also ==
- Communes of the Isère department
