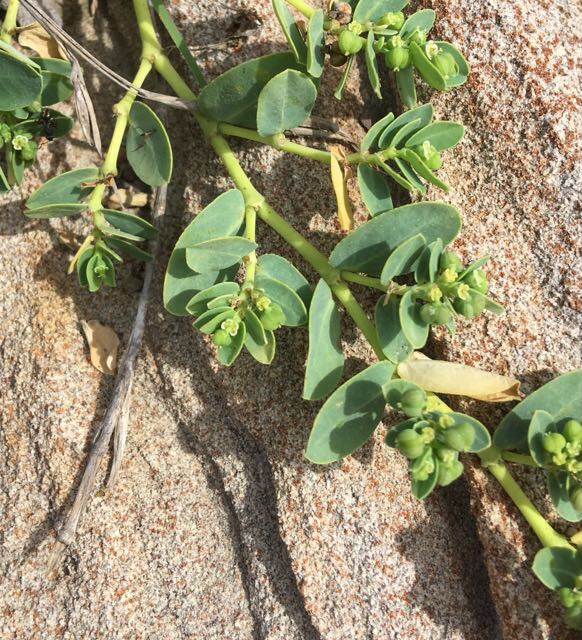

Scientific classification
- Kingdom: Plantae
- Clade: Embryophytes
- Clade: Tracheophytes
- Clade: Spermatophytes
- Clade: Angiosperms
- Clade: Eudicots
- Clade: Rosids
- Order: Malpighiales
- Family: Euphorbiaceae
- Genus: Euphorbia
- Species: E. psammogeton

Binomial name
- Euphorbia psammogeton P.S.Green

Synonyms
- Euphorbia sparrmanii Boiss.; Chamaesyce sparrmanii (Boiss.) Hurus.; Chamaesyce psammogeton (P.S.Green) P.I.Forst. & R.J.F.Hend.

= Euphorbia psammogeton =

Species of flowering plant

Euphorbia psammogeton, commonly known as sand spurge, is an Australian flowering plant in the family Euphorbiaceae. The specific epithet derives from the Greek psammos (“sand”) and geiton (“neighbour”), alluding to the typical habitat.

== Description ==
E. psammogeton is a smooth, mat-forming, perennial herb, often with a woody rootstock. It has articulated, prostrate stems, growing to 35 cm or more. Its oblong to broadly elliptic leaves are 1–3 cm long and 0.5–1.5 cm wide, and asymmetric at the base. The tiny flower-heads are surrounded by white leaf-like bracts. Each flower-head consists of a female flower surrounded by up to five sets of tiny male flowers. The fruiting capsule is smooth and about 2 mm long. It flowers in spring/summer and fruits in autumn/winter.

== Distribution and habitat ==
The plant is endemic to Australia; it is found along the coast of New South Wales and south-eastern Queensland, as well as on subtropical Lord Howe Island in the Tasman Sea. It occurs in sandy coastal habitats, such as coastal dunes, and on beaches above high tide level. It is listed as endangered in New South Wales.

== Taxonomy ==
Euphorbia psammogeton was first described by Green (1993) as Euphorbia psammogeton. This was amended to Chamaesyce psammogeton by Forster and Henderson in 1995 and was returned to the genus Euphorbia by Halford in 2012, giving it the currently accepted name of Euphorbia psammogeton.

== Conservation status ==
It is listed as endangered under the Biodiversity Conservation Act 2016. (Note: As Chamaesyce psammogeton.)
