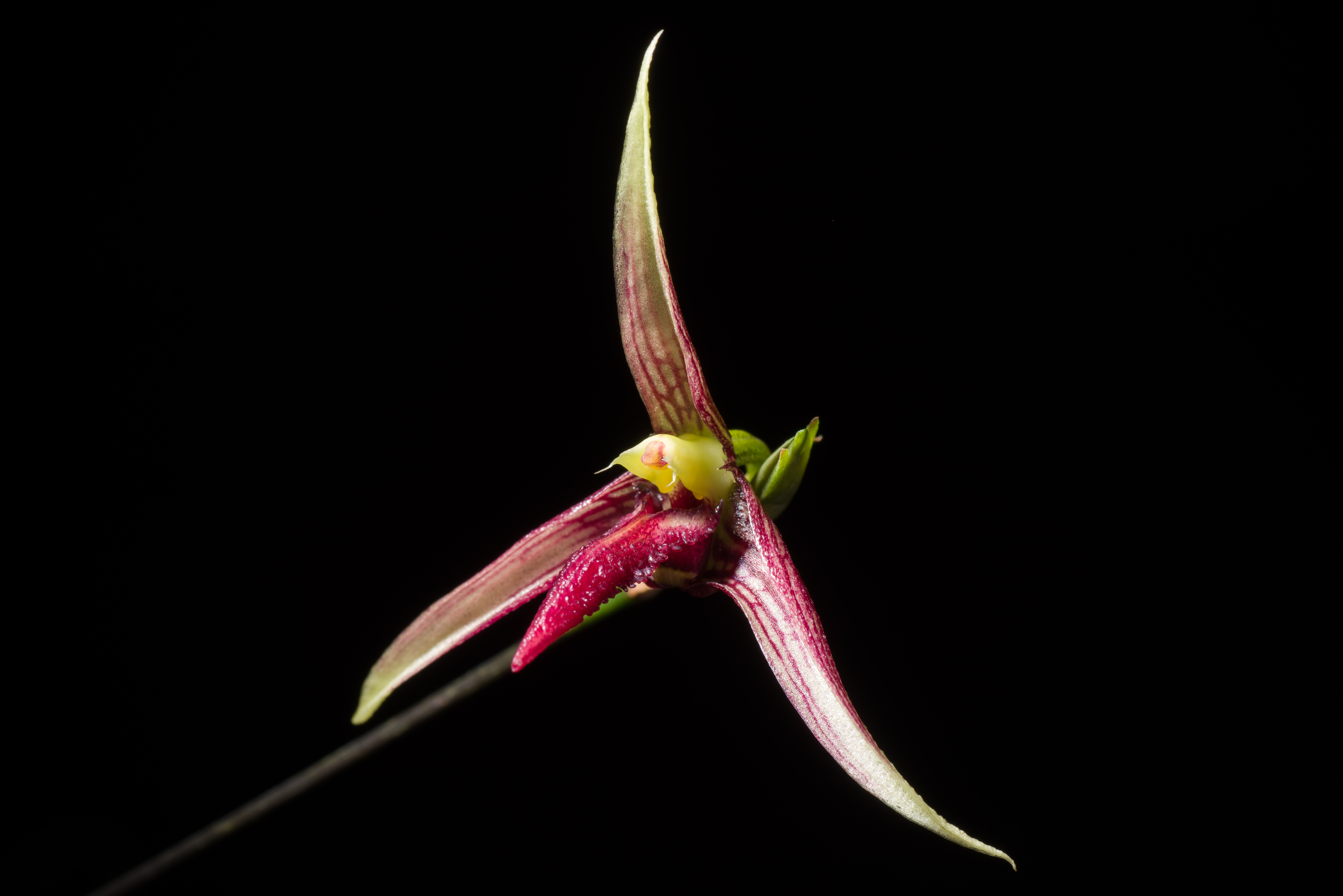
- Bulbophyllum cleistogamum

Scientific classification
- Kingdom: Plantae
- Clade: Embryophytes
- Clade: Tracheophytes
- Clade: Spermatophytes
- Clade: Angiosperms
- Clade: Monocots
- Order: Asparagales
- Family: Orchidaceae
- Subfamily: Epidendroideae
- Genus: Bulbophyllum
- Section: Bulbophyllum sect. Intervallatae; Ridley 1897

Type species
- Bulbophyllum attenuatum

Species
- See text

Synonyms
- Bulbophyllum sect. Macrouris JJ Sm. 1993; Bulbophyllum sect. Dialeipanthe Schlechter 1913

= Bulbophyllum sect. Intervallatae =

Section of flowering plants

Bulbophyllum sect. Intervallatae is a section of the genus Bulbophyllum.

== Description ==
Species in this section are epiphytes. They are distinguished by rhizomes with small pseudobulbs with wiry inflorescence bearing flowers that individually open in succession.

== Distribution ==
Plants from this section are found in Southeast Asia.

== Species ==
Bulbophyllum section Intervallatae comprises the following species:

Image	Name	Distribution	Elevation (m)
	Bulbophyllum adolphii Schltr. 1921	Papua New Guinea	
	Bulbophyllum andreeae A.D.Hawkes 1956	New Guinea, Sulawesi	1,200–1,900 metres (3,900–6,200 ft)
	Bulbophyllum asperilingue Schltr. 1919	Papua New Guinea	
	Bulbophyllum attenuatum Rolfe 1896	Borneo	
	Bulbophyllum caloglossum Schltr. 1913	Papua and New Guinea	500–1,200 metres (1,600–3,900 ft)
	Bulbophyllum cleistogamum Ridl. 1895	Peninsular Malaysia, Borneo, Sulawesi, and Philippines (Luzon)	400–500 metres (1,300–1,600 ft)
	Bulbophyllum crenilabium W. Kittr 1985-6	New Guinea	1,000 metres (3,300 ft)
	Bulbophyllum crocodilus J.J.Sm. 1912	New Guinea	300 metres (980 ft)
	Bulbophyllum digoelense J.J. Sm. 1911	Papua and New Guinea	80–400 metres (260–1,310 ft)
	Bulbophyllum distichum Schltr. 1913	New Guinea	450 metres (1,480 ft)
	Bulbophyllum elasmatopus Schltr. 1905	New Guinea	200–1,000 metres (660–3,280 ft)
	Bulbophyllum falcibracteum Schltr. 1923	Papua New Guinea	
	Bulbophyllum foetidilabrum Ormerod 2001	Bismarck Archipelago	
	Bulbophyllum guamense Ames 1914	Guam	300 metres (980 ft)
	Bulbophyllum hamadryas Schltr. 1913	New Guinea	800–1,300 metres (2,600–4,300 ft)
	Bulbophyllum linggense J.J.Sm. 1922	Sumatra	50–500 metres (160–1,640 ft)
	Bulbophyllum ligulifolium J.J.Sm. 1934	New Guinea	250 metres (820 ft)
	Bulbophyllum longiscapum Rolfe 1896	Papua New Guinea, the Solomon Islands to Tonga, Fiji, Vanuatu and Samoa	
	Bulbophyllum lumbriciforme J.J.Sm. 1920	Sumatra and Malaysia	1,000 metres (3,300 ft)
	Bulbophyllum macrochilum Rolfe 1896	Malaysia, Singapore and Borneo	0–1,000 metres (0–3,281 ft)
	Bulbophyllum mamberamense J.J.Sm. 1915	New Guinea	400 metres (1,300 ft)
	Bulbophyllum mayrii J.J.Sm. 1934	New Guinea	1,200 metres (3,900 ft)
	Bulbophyllum micronesiacum Schltr. 1921	Caroline Islands.	700–800 metres (2,300–2,600 ft)
	Bulbophyllum orsidice Ridl. 1916	New Guinea	
	Bulbophyllum papilio J.J.Sm. 1910	New Guinea	750–1,200 metres (2,460–3,940 ft)
	Bulbophyllum pardalinum Ridl. 1916	New Guinea	1,800–2,250 metres (5,910–7,380 ft)
	Bulbophyllum pristis J.J.Sm. 1913	New Guinea	900 metres (3,000 ft)
	Bulbophyllum rigidipes Schltr. 1905	New Guinea	
	Bulbophyllum rubrolineatum Schltr. 1923	Papua New Guinea	1,300–1,800 metres (4,300–5,900 ft)
	Bulbophyllum sarcodanthum Schltr. 1913	Papua New Guinea	
	Bulbophyllum scrobiculilabre J.J.Sm.1914	Papua and New Guinea	
	Bulbophyllum semiasperum J.J.Sm. 1934	New Guinea	1,100 metres (3,600 ft)
	Bulbophyllum sepikense W.Kittr. 1984 publ. 1985	Papua New Guinea	1,400–1,500 metres (4,600–4,900 ft)
	Bulbophyllum septemtrionale J.J. Sm. 1913	Papua and New Guinea	40 metres (130 ft)
	Bulbophyllum serra Schltr. 1913	Papua and New Guinea	150–900 metres (490–2,950 ft)
	Bulbophyllum serripetalum Schltr. 1923	Papua New Guinea	
	Bulbophyllum spathilingue J.J.Sm. 1908	New Guinea	
	Bulbophyllum tahitense Nadeaud 1873	East Polynesia and the Society Island (Tahiti, Moorea, Raiatea, Tahaa, Huahine, Bora Bora)	70–800 metres (230–2,620 ft)
	Bulbophyllum tardeflorens Ridley 1896	Borneo	0–1,600 metres (0–5,249 ft)
	Bulbophyllum tenuipes Schltr. 1913	New Guinea	800 metres (2,600 ft)
	Bulbophyllum teretilabre J.J.Sm. 1913	western New Guinea	
	Bulbophyllum theunissenii J.J.Sm. 1920	Sumatra	
	Bulbophyllum thrixspermiflorum J.J.Sm. 1908	New Guinea	40 metres (130 ft)
	Bulbophyllum thrixspermoides J.J.Sm. 1912	New Guinea	300 metres (980 ft)
	Bulbophyllum verruciferum Schltr. 1913	New Guinea	800–1,000 metres (2,600–3,300 ft)
