= List of endemic plants of the Tubuai Islands =

The Tubuai Islands are home to several dozen endemic species and subspecies of plants, including three endemic genera, Apostates, Metatrophis, and Pacifigeron. The World Geographical Scheme for Recording Plant Distributions treats the Tubuai Islands as a botanical country. Politically, the islands are part of French Polynesia.

Plants are listed alphabetically by plant family. Taxa endemic to a specific island are noted.

== Araliaceae ==
- Meryta choristantha Harms – Rapa Iti

== Argophyllaceae ==
- Corokia collenettei L.Riley – Rapa Iti

== Aspleniaceae ==
- Asplenium quaylei var. rapense E.D.Br – Rapa Iti
- Athyrium tenuipaleatum Copel. – Rapa Iti
- Diplazium fosbergii (Copel.) C.V.Morton – Rapa Iti
- Diplazium rapense E.D.Br. – Rapa Iti
- Diplazium sancti-johannis (Copel.) C.V.Morton – Tubuai
- Diplazium subquadripinnatum (Copel.) Lellinger – Rurutu
- Thelypteris diversisora (Copel.) C.F.Reed – Rapa Iti
- Thelypteris margaretae (E.D.Br.) Ching – Rapa Iti
- Thelypteris stokesii (E.D.Br.) C.F.Reed – Rapa Iti

== Asteliaceae ==
- Astelia rapensis Skottsb. – Rapa Iti

== Asteraceae ==
- Apostates Lander (endemic genus)
  - Apostates rapae (F.Br.) Lander – Rapa Iti
- Bidens meyeri V.A.Funk & K.R.Wood – Rapa Iti
- Bidens saint-johniana Sherff – Marotiri
- Fitchia rapensis F.Br. – Rapa Iti
- Oparanthus coriaceus (F.Br.) Sherff – Rapa Iti
- Oparanthus intermedius Sherff – Rapa Iti
- Oparanthus rapensis (F.Br.) Sherff – Rapa Iti
- Pacifigeron G.L.Nesom (endemic genus)
  - Pacifigeron indivisus Saldivia – Rapa Iti
  - Pacifigeron rapensis (F.Br.) G.L.Nesom – Rapa Iti

== Campanulaceae ==
- Sclerotheca margaretae F.Br. – Rapa Iti

== Celastraceae ==
- Gymnosporia pertinax (N.Hallé & J.Florence) M.P.Simmons – Rapa Iti

== Combretaceae ==
- Terminalia glabrata var. haroldii (Exell) Fosberg & Sachet

== Cunoniaceae ==
- Pterophylla rapensis (F.Br.) Pillon & H.C.Hopkins – Rapa Iti

== Cyatheaceae ==
- Cyathea stokesii (E.D.Br.) N.Hallé & J.Florence – Rapa Iti

== Cyperaceae ==
- Carex rapaensis (H.St.John) K.L.Wilson – Rapa Iti
- Cyperus rapensis F.Br. – Rapa Iti
- Morelotia involuta (H.St.John) J.J.Bruhl & R.L.Barrett

== Ericaceae ==
- Leptecophylla rapae (Sleumer) C.M.Weiller – Rapa Iti
- Vaccinium rapae Skottsb. – Rapa Iti

== Euphorbiaceae ==
- Acalypha raivavensis F.Br. – Raivavae and Tubuai
- Acalypha rapensis F.Br. – Rapa Iti
- Claoxylon collenettei L.Riley – Rapa Iti
- Homalanthus stokesii F.Br. – Rapa Iti
- Macaranga raivavaeensis H.St.John – Raivavae and Rimatara

== Fabaceae ==
- Serianthes rurutensis (F.Br.) I.C.Nielsen – Raivavae and Rurutu
- Sophora raivavaeensis H.St.John – Raivavae
- Sophora rapaensis H.St.John – Rapa Iti

== Gesneriaceae ==
- Cyrtandra elizabethae H.St.John – Rurutu
- Cyrtandra marthae H.St.John

== Hymenophyllaceae ==
- Trichomanes calyculatum (Copel.) C.V.Morton – Rapa Iti
- Trichomanes truncatum (Copel.) C.V.Morton – Rapa Iti

== Loganiaceae ==
- Geniostoma rapense F.Br. – Rapa Iti

== Marattiaceae ==
- Angiopteris rapensis E.D.Br. – Rapa Iti

== Nyctaginaceae ==
- Ceodes amplifolia (Heimerl) E.F.S.Rossetto & Caraballo
- Ceodes coronata (Heimerl) E.F.S.Rossetto & Caraballo – Rapa Iti
- Ceodes rapaensis (J.Florence) E.F.S.Rossetto & Caraballo – Rapa Iti

== Pandanaceae ==
- Pandanus brachycarpus Martelli
- Pandanus calostigma var. calostigma
- Pandanus rapensis F.Br. – Rapa Iti

== Phyllanthaceae ==
- Glochidion longfieldiae (Ridl.) F.Br. – Rapa Iti
- Glochidion raivavense F.Br. – Raivavae, Rurutu, and Tubuai
- Glochidion rapaense J.Florence – Rapa Iti

== Pittosporaceae ==
- Pittosporum luteum H.St.John – Rapa Iti
- Pittosporum maireaui H.St.John – Rapa Iti
- Pittosporum perahuense H.St.John – Rapa Iti
- Pittosporum purpureum H.St.John – Rapa Iti
- Pittosporum raivavaeense H.St.John – Raivavae
- Pittosporum rapense F.Br. – Rapa Iti
- Pittosporum takauele H.St.John – Rapa Iti

== Plantaginaceae ==
- Callitriche insularis Lansdown – Rapa Iti
- Plantago rapensis F.Br. – Rapa Iti
- Plantago rupicola Pilg. – Rapa Iti
- Veronica rapensis F.Br. – Rapa Iti

== Polypodiaceae ==
- Calymmodon rapensis Copel. (unplaced)
- Ctenitis rapensis (E.D.Br.) Holttum – Rapa Iti
- Ctenitis sciaphila var. raivavensis (E.D.Br.) Holttum – Raivavae, Rurutu, and Tubuai
- Elaphoglossum meyeri Rouhan – Rapa Iti
- Elaphoglossum rapense Copel. – Rapa Iti
- Lepisorus mucronatus var. durus (Copel.) Rouhan – Rapa Iti
- Polystichum australium Copel. – Raivavae and Tubuai
- Polystichum rapense E.D.Br. – Rapa Iti
- Polystichum stokesii E.D.Br. – Rapa Iti

== Primulaceae ==
- Lysimachia rapensis F.Br. – Rapa Iti
- Myrsine andersonii Fosberg & Sachet
- Myrsine brownii Fosberg & Sachet
- Myrsine rapensis (F.Br.) Fosberg & Sachet – Rapa Iti

== Pteridaceae ==
- Adiantum glabrum Copel. – Rapa Iti
- Pteris tripartita var. raivavensis E.D.Br. – Raivavae

== Rubiaceae ==
- Coprosma cookei Fosberg – Rapa Iti
- Coprosma rapensis var. rapensis – Rapa Iti
- Coprosma velutina Fosberg
- Ixora brevipedunculata Fosberg
- Ixora raivavaensis Fosberg – Raivavae
- Ixora stokesii F.Br. – Rapa Iti
- Kadua rapensis F.Br. – Rapa Iti
- Psychotria raivavaensis Fosberg – Raivavae
- Psychotria rapensis F.Br. – Rapa Iti
- Psychotria tubuaiensis Fosberg

== Rutaceae ==
- Melicope balgooyi Appelhans, W.L.Wagner & K.R.Wood – Rapa Iti

== Santalaceae ==
- Exocarpos psilotiformis Skottsb. – Rapa Iti
- Santalum insulare var. margaretae (F.Br.) Skottsb. – Rapa Iti
- Santalum insulare var. raivavense F.Br. – Raivavae

== Sapindaceae ==
- Allophylus rapensis F.Br. – Rapa Iti

== Scrophulariaceae ==
- Myoporum rapense subsp. rapense – Rapa Iti
- Myoporum rimatarense F.Br. – Rimatara
- Myoporum stokesii F.Br. – Raivavae

== Urticaceae ==
- Metatrophis F.Br. (endemic genus)
  - Metatrophis margaretae F.Br. – Rapa Iti
- Pilea australis L.F.Fu & A.K.Monro – Rapa Iti
- Pilea occulta J.Florence – Rapa Iti
- Pilea sykesii (J.Florence) L.F.Fu & A.K.Monro – Raivavae
- Pipturus australium J.Florence
- Procris pedunculata var. stokesii F.Br. – Raivavae
