= Tubuai tropical moist forests =

Terrestrial ecoregion in the Austral Islands of French Polynesia

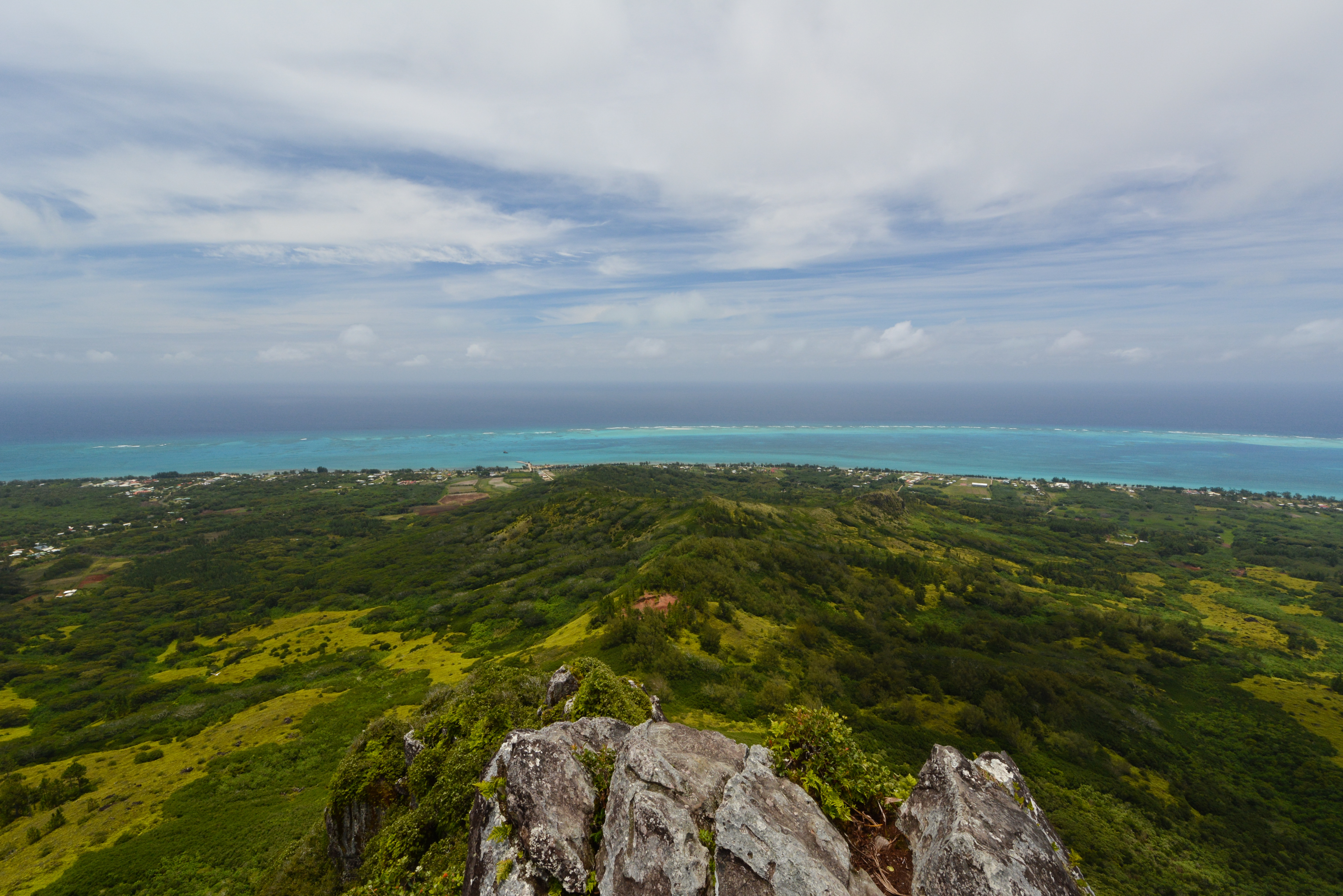
- View of Tubuai from Mount Taita'a

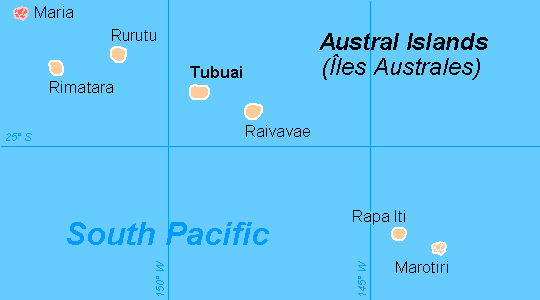
- Map of the Austral Islands

Ecology
- Realm: Oceanian
- Biome: tropical and subtropical moist broadleaf forests

Geography
- Area: 142 km^{2} (55 mi^{2})
- Country: French Polynesia
- Administrative subdivisions: Austral Islands

Conservation
- Conservation status: Critical/endangered
- Protected: 0 km² (0%)

The Tubuai tropical moist forests is a tropical and subtropical moist broadleaf forests ecoregion in French Polynesia. It covers the Austral Islands.

== Geography ==
The Austral islands include two island groups, the Tubuai Group and the Bass Islands. The Tubuai Group (22–23º S, 147–152º W) includes the four inhabited islands of Rimatara, Rurutu, Tubuai, and Raivavae, along with the uninhabited Îles Maria atoll. The Bass Islands (27º 35' S, 144º W) include inhabited Rapa island (or Rapa Iti) and the uninhabited Marotiri or Bass Rocks to the southeast. Tubuai is the largest of the Austral islands at 44 km^{2}. The total land area of the ecoregion is 142 km^{2}.

The islands are volcanic in origin, formed as the Pacific Plate moved west-northwest over a geologic hotspot. The inhabited islands have volcanic rocks at the center of the island, with rings of coralline limestone, known as makatea, in the coastal lowlands. Makatea was created when the islands were uplifted to expose ancient coral reefs, and often forms rough and uncultivable terrain.

Tubuai has two central peaks which rise above 400 meters, and are surrounded and separated by makatea at lower elevations. Rurutu Island has volcanic hills at the center of the island, with Manureva reaching 385 meters elevation. The island was geologically uplifted, creating a continuous makatea rim along the shore that reaches 50 to 60 meters high. Rimatara Island also has a makatea rim, with low and weathered central volcanic hills. Maria is a low coral atoll. Raivavae is an heavily eroded extinct volcano with a central peak (Hiro, 438 meters), with makatea outcrops along the shore, and surrounded by a lagoon and encircling barrier reef.

Rapa is an ancient crescent-shaped volcanic caldera. Its highest point is Perau at 633 meters, which is also the highest peak in the ecoregion. Marotiri consists of very young, steep volcanic crags with no fringing reef.

== Flora ==
The natural vegetation includes lowland forest and montane rain forests.

There are about 185 native species of flowering plants in the Tubuai group, of which 28, or 15%, are endemic. 20% of Rimatara's plants are endemic. Rapa has 189 vascular plant species, of which 67, or 35%, are endemic. Rapa's forests also include typical Oceanian genera like Metrosideros, Fitchia, Bidens, and Sclerotheca, as well as genera with New Zealand affinities like Hebe, Olearia, Haloragis, and Corokia.

Montane forests on Tubuai include the trees Metrosideros collina, Aleurites moluccanus, Celastrus vitiensis, Myrsine spp., Ixora spp., Psychotria spp., Cantium barbatum, and Charpentiera australis, along with the tree fern Sphaeropteris medullaris and the large fern Angiopteris.

=== Endemic flora ===
Plants endemic to Rapa Iti include the flowering plants Meryta choristantha, Corokia colleneettei, Astelia rapensis, Apostates rapae, Bidens meyeri, Fitchia rapensis, Oparanthus coriaceus, Oparanthus intermedius, Oparanthus rapensis, Sclerotheca margaretae, Gymnosporia pertinax, Pterophylla rapensis, Carex rapaensis, Cyperus rapaensis, Leptecophylla rapae, Vaccinium rapae, Acalypha rapensis, Claoxylon collenettei, Sophora rapaensis Trichomanes calyculatum, Trichomanes truncatum, Angiopteris rapensis, Ceodes coronata, Ceodes rapaensis, Pandanus rapensis, Glochidion longfieldiae, Glochidion rapaense, Pittosporum luteum, Pittosporum maireaui, Pittosporum perahuense, Pittosporum purpureum, Pittosporum rapense, Pittosporum takauele, Callitriche insularis, Plantago rapensis, Plantago rupicola, Veronica rapensis, Lysimachia rapensis, Myrsine rapensis, Coprosma cookei, Coprosma rapensis var. rapensis, Ixora stokesii, Kadua rapensis, Psychotria rapensis, Melicope balgooyi, Exocarpos psilotiformis, Santalum insulare var. margaretae, Allophylus rapensis, Myoporum rapense, Metatrophis margaretae, Pilea australis, and Pilea occulta.

Ferns endemic to Rapa Iti include Asplenium quaylei var. rapense, Athyrium tenuipaleatum, Cyathea stokesii, Diplazium fosbergii, Diplazium rapense, Thelypteris diversisora, Thelypteris margaretae, Thelypteris stokesii, Ctenitis rapensis, Adiantum glabrum, Elaphoglossum meyeri, Elaphoglossum rapense, Lepisorus mucronatus var. durus, Polystichum rapense, and Polystichum stokesii.

Acalypha raivavensis, Sophora raivavaeensis, Pittosporum raivavaeense, Pteris tripartita var. raivavensis, Ixora raivavaensis, Psychotria raivavaensis, Santalum insulare var. raivavense, Myoporum stokesii, Pilea sykesii, and Procris pedunculata var. stokesii are endemic to Raivavae.

Cyrtandra elizabethae is endemic to Rurutu.

Bidens saint-johniana is endemic to Marotiri.

Myoporum rimatarense is endemic to Rimatara.

Macaranga raivavaeensis is native to Raivavae and Rimatara. Serianthes rurutensis is endemic to Rurutu and Raivavae. Glochidion raivavense is endemic to Raivavae, Rurutu, and Tubuai. Polystichum australium is endemic to Raivavae and Tubuai.

== Fauna ==
The ecoregion has two endemic birds. The Rimatara reed warbler (Acrocephalus rimatarae) is limited to Rimatara, but is locally abundant. The Rapa fruit-dove (Ptilonopus huttoni), is found only in 3 km^{2} of mid- to high-elevation forest fragments on Rapa.

Kuhl's lorikeet (Vini kuhli) once ranged across the Cook Islands and French Polynesia, but is now found only Rimatara, and on three islands in Kiribati where it was introduced by humans. The introduced Brown rat (Rattus norvegicus) preys on the bird's eggs and chicks.

== Conservation and threats ==
The lowland forests on the main high islands have mostly been destroyed by conversion to agriculture, anthropogenic fires, and uncontrolled grazing by introduced goats, pigs, cattle, and horses. Outside cultivated areas, secondary vegetation includes thickets of Hibiscus tiliaceus with introduced orange trees and common guava (Psidium guajava), Dicranopteris linearis fernlands, and grasslands. The lowland atoll forests of the uninhabited Maria Islands are relatively intact.

Montane forests have also been reduced and degraded, but some relatively inaccessible or uncultivable areas remain intact.

Many exotic plants are naturalized, and some are considered invasive. On Tubuai Falcataria falcata, Furcraea foetida, Hedychium flavescens, Lantana camara, Leucaena leucocephala, Melia azedarach, Merremia peltata, Psidium guajava, and Syzygium cumini are naturalized, and Melinis minutiflora, Paspalum conjugatum, Psidium cattleianum, Rubus rosifolius, Stachytarpheta urticifolia, Syzygium jambos, and Tecoma stans are considered invasive. Psidium cattleianum or Chinese guava covers many mountain ridges on Tubuai, the former habitat of Charpentiera australis and other native species. On Rapa Hedychium flavescens and Melia azedarach are considered invasive.

Brown rats (Rattus norvegicus) were introduced to some of the islands by humans, and have decimated some of the local birds, including Kuhl's lorikeet. Rat control is important to the lorikeet's conservation on Rimatara.
