= Flora of Tubuai =

This is a list of the flora of the Tubuai, an island in French Polynesia.

== Alphabetical, all species ==
- Acalypha raivavensis
- Acrostichum aureum
- Adiantum hispidulum
- Allophylus rhomboidalis
- Alyxia stellata
- Amphineuron opulentum
- Angiopteris evecta
- Antrophyum plantagineum
- Arachniodes aristata
- Asplenium australasicum
- Asplenium caudatum
- Asplenium gibberosum
- Asplenium horridum
- Asplenium indusiatum
- Asplenium laserpitiifolium
- Asplenium nidus
- Asplenium obtusatum
- Asplenium quaylei var. rapense
- Barringtonia asiatica
- Belvisia mucronata
- Blechnum capense
- Blechnum norfolkianum
- Blechnum orientale
- Blechnum vulcanicum
- Boerhavia acutifolia
- Boerhavia tetrandra
- Bolbitis lonchophora
- Bulbophyllum longiflorum
- Caesalpinia major
- Calanthe triplicata
- Calophyllum inophyllum
- Canavalia rosea
- Canavalia sericea
- Cassytha filiformis
- Celtis pacifica
- Cerbera manghas
- Charpentiera australis
- Christella parasitica
- Cladium jamaicense
- Cocculus orbiculatus
- Cocos nucifera
- Colubrina asiatica
- Coprosma velutina
- Cordia subcordata
- Ctenitis sciaphila var. raivavensis
- Cyathea medullaris
- Cyclophyllum barbatum
- Cyclosorus interruptus
- Davallia solida
- Dendrobium involutum
- Dianella intermedia
- Dicranopteris linearis
- Dioclea wilsonii
- Diplazium harpeodes
- Dodonaea viscosa
- Doodia media
- Doryopteris concolor
- Elaeocarpus tonganus
- Elaphoglossum tahitesne
- Entada phaseoloides
- Eria rostriflora
- Eugenia reinwardtiana
- Fagraea berteroana
- Ficinia nodosa
- Fimbristylis cymosa subsp. umbello-capitata
- Fimbristylis dichotoma
- Glochidion raivavense
- Guettarda speciosa
- Haloragis sp.
- Haplopteris elongata
- Hedyotis romanzoffiensis
- Heliotropium anomalum
- Hernandia moehrenhoutiana subsp. samoensis
- Hernandia nymphaeifolia
- Hernandia ovigera subsp. stokesii
- Hibiscus australensis
- Hibiscus tiliaceus
- Histiopteris incisa
- Homalium sp.
- Huperzia phlegmaria
- Huperzia squarrosa
- Hymenophyllum diversilabium
- Hymenophyllum polyanthos
- Hypolepis tenuifolia
- Ipomoea indica
- Ipomoea littoralis
- Ipomoea macrantha
- Ipomoea pes-caprae subsp. brasiliensis
- Ixora brevipedunculata
- Jasminum didymum
- Korthalsella platycaula
- Lepidium bidentatum
- Lepturus repens
- Liparis clypeolum
- Liparis revoluta
- Lomariopsis brackenridgei
- Lycopodiella cernua
- Lygodium reticulatum
- Macropiper latifolium
- Malaxis resupinata
- Maytenus vitiensis
- Meryta brachypoda
- Metrosideros collina
- Metrosideros collina var. villosa
- Microsorum commutatum
- Microsorum grossum
- Microtatorchis paife
- Millettia sp.
- Mucuna gigantea
- Myrsine andersonii
- Myrsine brownii
- Nephrolepis biserrata
- Nephrolepis cordifolia
- Nephrolepis hirsutula
- Nervilia aragoana
- Oberonia equitans
- Ophioglossum pendulum
- Pandanus tectorius
- Pandanus tectorius var. tubuaiensis
- Paspalum distichum
- Peperomia australana
- Peperomia blanda var. floribunda
- Peperomia pallida
- Peperomia rapensis
- Pipturus australium
- Pisonia amplifolia
- Pisonia coronata
- Pisonia grandis
- Planchonella tahitensis
- Plectranthus parviflorus
- Polystichum australium
- Portulaca lutea
- Premna serratifolia
- Procris pedunculata
- Psilotum nudum
- Psychotria tubuaiensis
- Pteris comans
- Pteris tripartita
- Ptisana salicina
- Pyrrosia serpens
- Reediella endlicheriana
- Reediella humilis
- Rhus taitensis
- Scaevola taccada
- Schleinitzia insularum
- Schoenoplectus littoralis subsp. subulatus
- Selenodesmium dentatum
- Serianthes rurutensis
- Sophora tomentosa
- Sphaerostephanos invisus
- Sphenomeris chinensis
- Stictocardia campanulata
- Suriana maritima
- Taeniophyllum fasciola
- Tarenna sambucina
- Tectaria papillosa
- Teratophyllum wilkesianum
- Terminalia glabrata var. haroldii
- Thespesia populnea
- Tournefortia argentea
- Trema discolor
- Triumfetta procumbens
- Tuberolabium papuanum
- Uncinia uncinata
- Wikstroemia coriacea
- Xylosma suaveolens subsp. gracile

== By plant family ==
=== Acanthaceae ===
- Dicliptera clavata
- Dicliptera forsteriana

=== Aizoaceae ===
- Sesuvium portulacastrum
  - Sesuvium portulacastrum subsp. portulacastrum

=== Amaranthaceae ===
- Achyranthes aspera
  - Achyranthes aspera var. velutina

=== Apiaceae ===
- Apium prostratum
  - Apium prostratum subsp. prostratum

=== Apocynaceae ===
- Alyxia stellata
- Cerbera manghas
- Cerbera odollam
- Ochrosia oppositifolia

=== Araliaceae ===
- Meryta brachypoda
- Meryta choristantha

=== Arecaceae ===
- Pelagodoxa henryana

=== Argophyllaceae ===
- Corokia collenettei

=== Asphodelaceae ===
- Dianella adenanthera

=== Aspleniaceae ===
- Asplenium aethiopicum
  - Asplenium aethiopicum subsp. aethiopicum
- Asplenium australasicum
  - Asplenium australasicum f. australasicum
- Asplenium decurrens
- Asplenium gibberosum
- Asplenium horridum
- Asplenium indusiatum
- Asplenium laserpitiifolium
- Asplenium oblongifolium
- Asplenium polyodon
- Asplenium quaylei
  - Asplenium quaylei var. rapense
- Asplenium rapense
- Athyrium tenuipaleatum
- Blechnum aequabile
- Blechnum medium
- Blechnum orientale
- Blechnum pacificum
- Blechnum venosum
- Blechnum vestitum
- Blechnum vulcanicum
- Diplazium fosbergii
- Diplazium harpeodes
- Diplazium polyanthes
- Diplazium rapense
- Diplazium sancti-johannis
- Diplazium subquadripinnatum
- Macrothelypteris polypodioides
- Macrothelypteris torresiana
- Thelypteris costata
- Thelypteris dentata
- Thelypteris diversisora
- Thelypteris forsteri
- Thelypteris interrupta
- Thelypteris margaretae
- Thelypteris opulenta
- Thelypteris parasitica
- Thelypteris stokesii
- Thelypteris unita

=== Asteliaceae ===
- Astelia rapensis

=== Asteraceae ===
- Adenostemma viscosum
- Apostates rapae
- Bidens meyeri
- Bidens saint-johniana
- Dichrocephala integrifolia
  - Dichrocephala integrifolia subsp. integrifolia
- Pacifigeron indivisus
- Pacifigeron rapensis
- Pseudognaphalium luteoalbum
- Senecio stokesii
- Wollastonia biflora
  - Wollastonia biflora var. biflora
