= Flora of French Polynesia =

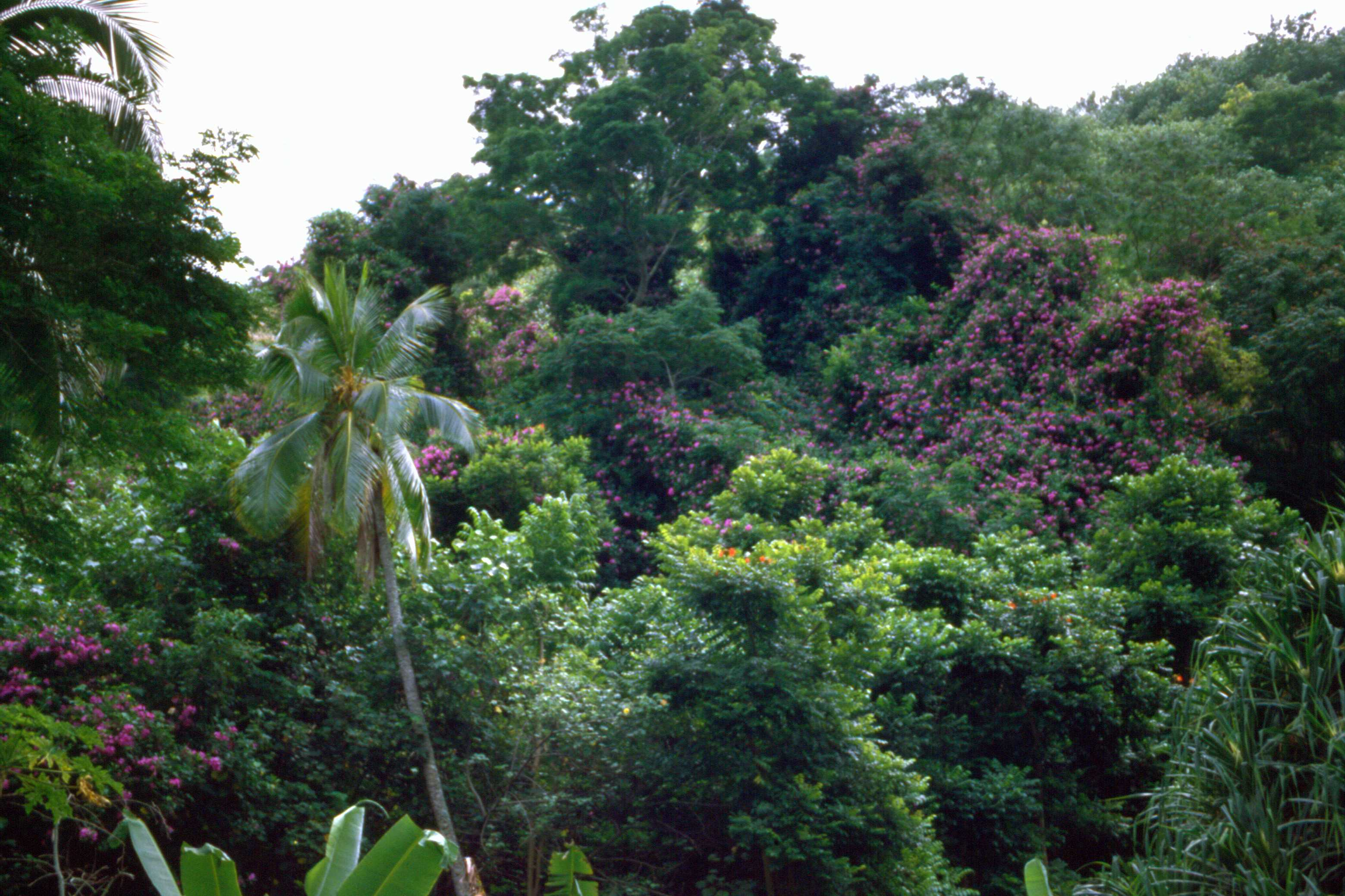
Forest in Tahiti

The flora of French Polynesia refers to the native vegetation of the Marquesas Islands, the Tuamotu Archipelago, the Society Islands and the Tubuai Islands, located in Oceania. Due to its type of vegetation, French Polynesia falls within the palaeotropic floral kingdom.

The flora of these islands is relatively poor in terms of diversity of species, due to their geographical isolation. However, most of the islands are covered by tropical forest. That is because the soil of volcanic origin is very fertile, and the climate is warm and humid. Among the trees of these islands that stand out are the coconut tree, the breadfruit, the casuarina, the banana, the ceiba, the banyan, the ilang-ilang, the polynesian chestnut, the flamboyant and the Caribbean pine. Among the bushes that stand out are the tiaré flower (emblem of Tahiti), the hibiscus, the plumeria, the bougainvillea, the gardenia, the jasmine and the oleander.

Fruit picking is one of the main sources of income in the island's agricultural sector. Among the foods produced are mango, papayas, avocados, grapefruit, pineapples, oranges, coconuts, bananas and to a lesser extent taro and yam.

== Biodiversity ==
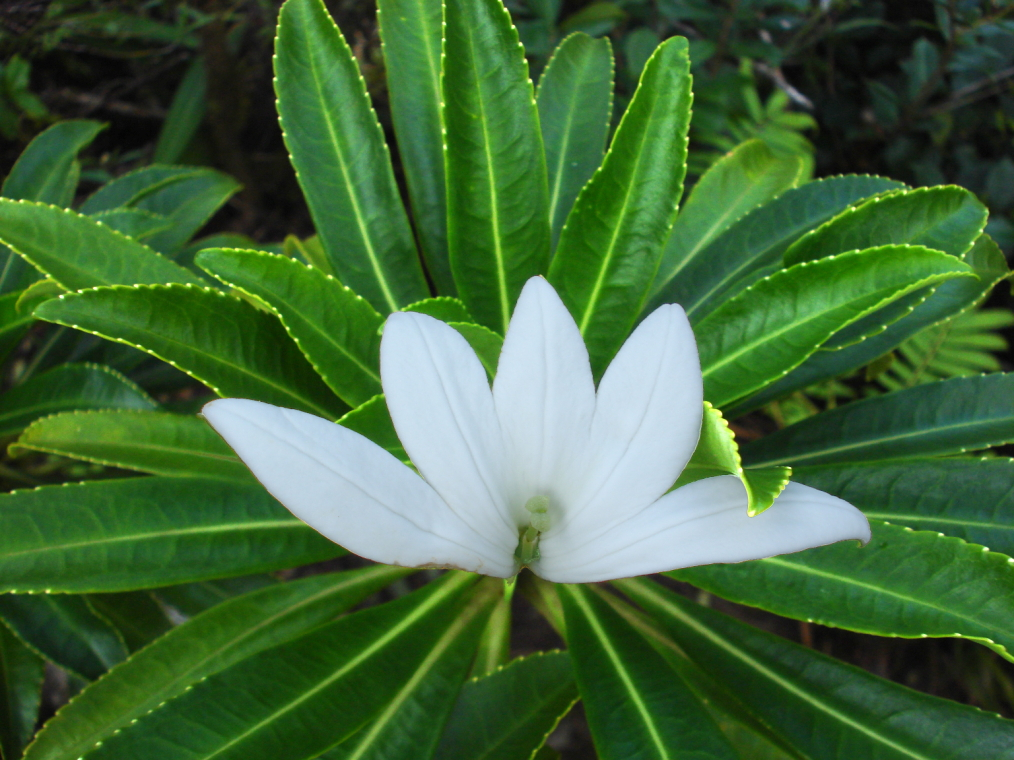
Flower of Apetahia

According to the World Wildlife Fund, 42% of the 320 vascular plants of the islands are endemic. Some genera of vascular plants endemic to French Polynesia are: Pelagodoxa, Apetahia, Lebronnecia, Haroldiella, Plakothira, Pacifigeron, Metatrophis and Oparanthus.

WWF describes four ecoregions on the islands of French Polynesia: the 'wet tropical forests of the Marquesas', the 'wet tropical forest of the Society Islands', the 'humid tropical forest of the Tuamotu' and the 'tropical rainforest of the Tubuai'.

Three species of orchids (Orchidaceae) are endemic: Oberonia taitensis, Taeniophyllum elegantissimum and Bulbophyllum tahitense. Other endemic flora includes Pritchardia pericularum, Serianthes rurutensis, Macaranga raivavaeensis, Nicotiana fatuhivensis, Acalypha raivavensis, Lepinia taitensis, Erythrina tahitensis, Chamaesyce atoto, Pittosporum raivavaeense, Sophora mangarevaensis and Cyrtandra nukuhivensis.

== Natural history ==
Migration of flora during the Pliocene from Malaysia to Polynesia.

The islands of French Polynesia were formed between the late Miocene or early Pliocene and Pleistocene. The American botanist Edwin Bingham Copeland was one of the first scientists to study the flora of the islands. He concluded that the Indochinese peninsula (South Asia, Malaysia and Indonesia) was the origin of the vegetation in the islands of Papua, Solomon, New Zealand and finally the rest of Polynesia.

However, it was not the only point from where the flora migrated to French Polynesia. Copeland discovered that the ferns of the family Hymenophyllaceae and Rubiaceae, existing today in Polynesia, have an Antarctic origin. This is demonstrated by fossil evidence on the Chiloé Island. The contact between Polynesia and Antarctica ceased about 20 million years ago.

The most widely accepted scientific theory is that the polynesian flora (and of Oceania in general, except for the flora of Australia) comes from South Asia, since the ecological niches in both regions are occupied by related plants. In addition, going east shows a decline in biodiversity: while Malaysia has 23,500 plant species cataloged, Papua has 5,000, New Caledonia has 3,250 and French Polynesia only 1,000.

Some species such as Casuarina equisetifolia or Cocos nucifera were able to cross the ocean because their seeds could float in the water and were washed ashore to take root. Apparently, wind and birds also helped in the colonization.

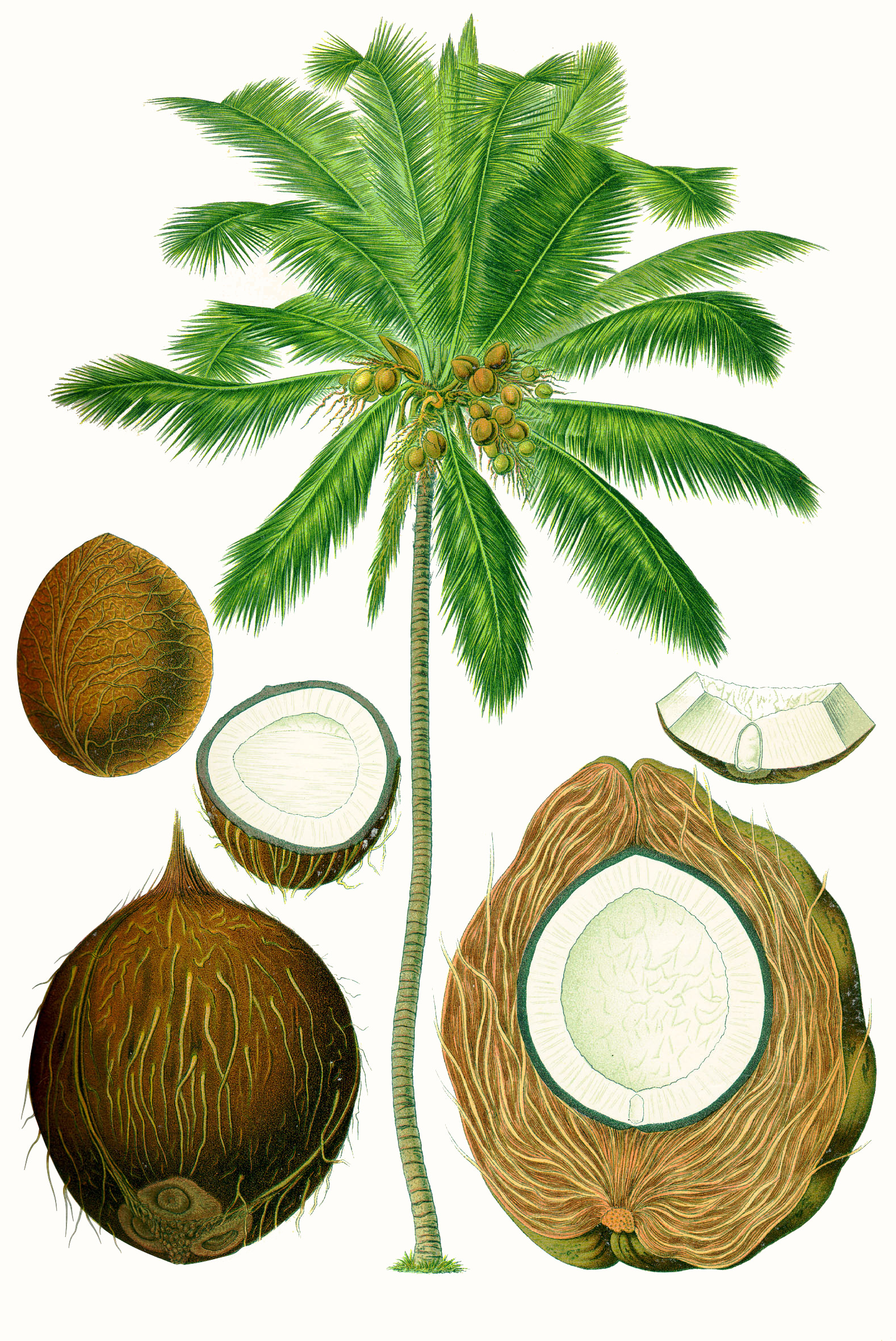
Cocos nucifera drawing by Köhler.

=== Botanical research ===
The first European explorers on the islands were Spanish and Portuguese, however there is no record of any study of the nature of the islands. The British naturalist Joseph Banks accompanied the explorer James Cook in 1769 on his trip aboard HMS Endeavour through the South Pacific Ocean, and is considered the first European to study the Tahitian vegetation.

In 1789 there is the well-known mutiny of HMS Bounty, a ship commanded by Major William Bligh that was destined to Tahiti to study the flora of the island, especially the bread tree. The crew of the ship, amazed by the landscapes, women and Polynesian lifestyle decided to mutiny against the commander and stay in Polynesia.

== Human action ==
Human action has been decisive for the flora of French Polynesia. The percentage of endemic species of the islands is very small. Humans introduced numerous species, either by their uses, by being edible or by ornamentation.

From Tonga and Samoa came the first human beings to the islands, specifically to the Marquesas Islands, in the year 300 AD approximately. The following migratory waves were established in Tuamotu and Tahiti in 800 AD, and finally in the Tuha'a Pae. These Polynesian population brought with them edible plants such as the coconut tree, the mape, the bread tree or uru, the yam, the sugar cane, the banana and the rose apple. All of them of Indo-Malay origin.

In 1521, the first European exploration, the Magellan-Elcano expedition, arrived in Pukapuka. From that moment on, the Europeans would bring new plants of European and American origins such as mango, vanilla, avocado, lemon and tamarind. In addition to other ornamental flowers, since before then the Tahitians only knew the tiaré and the Pua Keni Keni.

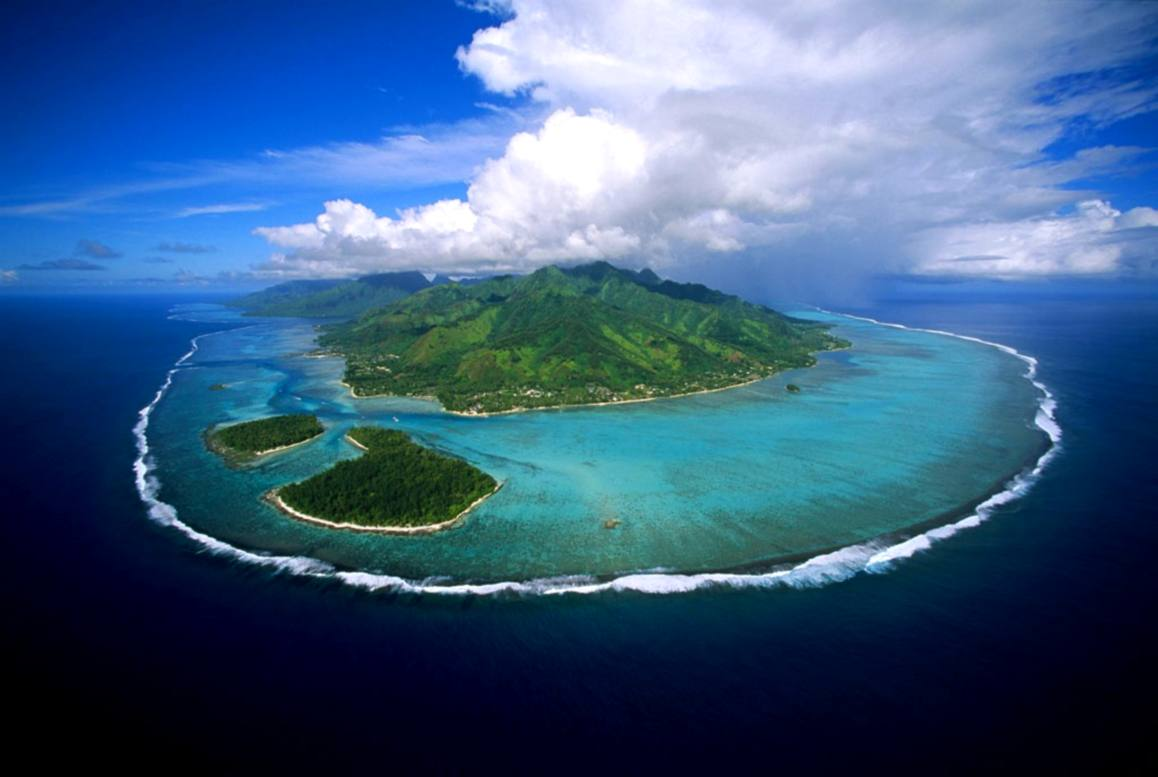
Aerial view of the Mo'orea reefs.

=== Threats ===
WWF determined that the state of the flora of the Marquesas Islands was "critical/endangered". The main threats are climate change and the urbanization of coasts with resorts and hotels.

The island of Mo'orea, 16 km from Tahiti, has an important area of coral reefs declared by UNESCO as a Ramsar site. The abuse of the island's natural resources for tourism endangers these reefs.

Agriculture does not present a major environmental threat since only 6.28% of the land is arable.

An important threat to the vegetation of French Polynesia is the introduction of herbivorous animals, as was done in the 19th century by Europeans. The flora of the islands never knew animals that ate their leaves, so they never developed spikes, thorns or poisons. These plants do not have any method of defense against horses, goats, sheep and other animals of European origin.

=== Protected areas ===
Since 1952, the French government has been establishing protected terrestrial areas in French Polynesia and since 1971, it has also done so with marine areas. As of 2016, 192 natural sites were created. Of particular note is the biosphere reserve of the Fakarava atolls and the Ramsar area of the Mo'orea Lagoon (5,000 hectares of protected land).

== See also ==
- Volcanic island
