= Fitchia mangarevensis =

Conservation status
- Extinct (IUCN 2.3)

Scientific classification
- Kingdom: Plantae
- Clade: Tracheophytes
- Clade: Angiosperms
- Clade: Eudicots
- Clade: Asterids
- Order: Asterales
- Family: Asteraceae
- Genus: Fitchia
- Species: †F. mangarevensis

Binomial name
- †Fitchia mangarevensis F.Br. (1935)

Extinct species of flowering plant

Fitchia mangarevensis was a species of flowering plant in the family Asteraceae. It was found only on the island of Taravai in the Tuamotu Archipelago of French Polynesia, and is now extinct.
