= Cyperus marquisensis =

Conservation status
- Near Threatened (IUCN 3.1)

Scientific classification
- Kingdom: Plantae
- Clade: Embryophytes
- Clade: Tracheophytes
- Clade: Angiosperms
- Clade: Monocots
- Clade: Commelinids
- Order: Poales
- Family: Cyperaceae
- Genus: Cyperus
- Species: C. marquisensis

Binomial name
- Cyperus marquisensis F.Br., 1931

Species of sedge

Cyperus marquisensis is a species of sedge that is native to the Cook Islands and the Marquesas Islands in the Pacific Ocean.

== See also ==
- List of Cyperus species
