= Cyperus moutona =

Scientific classification
- Kingdom: Plantae
- Clade: Tracheophytes
- Clade: Angiosperms
- Clade: Monocots
- Clade: Commelinids
- Order: Poales
- Family: Cyperaceae
- Genus: Cyperus
- Species: C. moutona

Binomial name
- Cyperus moutona F.Br., 1931

Species of sedge

Cyperus moutona is a species of sedge that is native to the Marquesas Islands in the Pacific Ocean.

== See also ==
- List of Cyperus species
