= Carex tahitensis =

Conservation status
- Vulnerable (IUCN 3.1)

Scientific classification
- Kingdom: Plantae
- Clade: Embryophytes
- Clade: Tracheophytes
- Clade: Angiosperms
- Clade: Monocots
- Clade: Commelinids
- Order: Poales
- Family: Cyperaceae
- Genus: Carex
- Species: C. tahitensis

Binomial name
- Carex tahitensis F.Br.

Species of grass-like plant

Carex tahitensis is a species of perennial sedge which is endemic to Tahiti in the Society Islands.

== See also ==
- List of Carex species
