= Fitchia rapensis =

Conservation status
- Vulnerable (IUCN 3.1)

Scientific classification
- Kingdom: Plantae
- Clade: Tracheophytes
- Clade: Angiosperms
- Clade: Eudicots
- Clade: Asterids
- Order: Asterales
- Family: Asteraceae
- Genus: Fitchia
- Species: F. rapensis

Binomial name
- Fitchia rapensis F.Br.

Species of flowering plant

Fitchia rapensis (Rapa: 'anei) is a species of flowering plant in the family Asteraceae. It is endemic to the island of Rapa Iti in the Tubuai Islands of French Polynesia, where it grows in lowland tropical moist forest. It is threatened by habitat loss from human-set fires, expansion of agriculture, competition from invasive plants, and over-grazing by goats. The IUCN Red List assesses the species as vulnerable.

The species was first described by Forest B. H. Brown in 1935.
