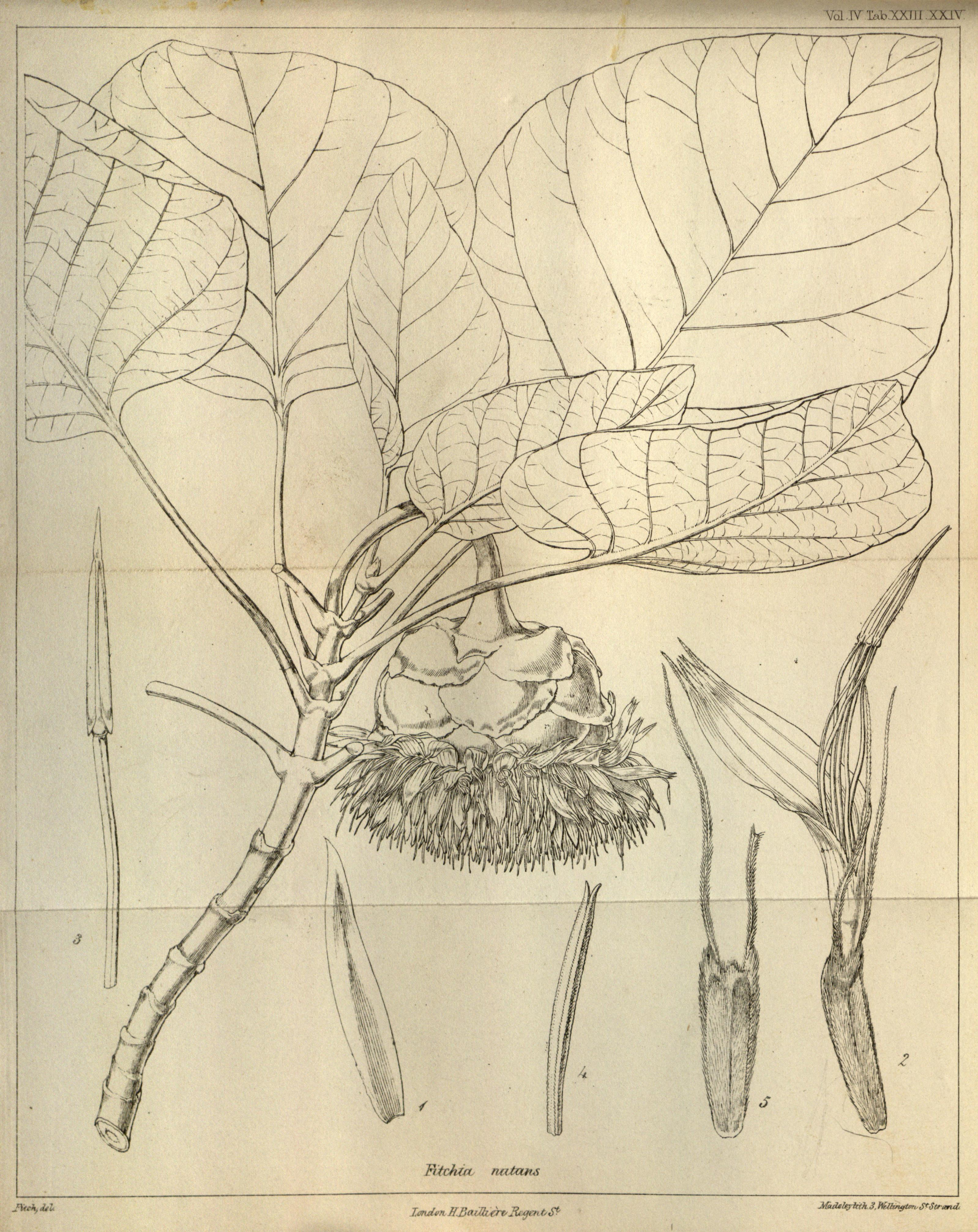

Conservation status
- Endangered (IUCN 3.1)

Scientific classification
- Kingdom: Plantae
- Clade: Embryophytes
- Clade: Tracheophytes
- Clade: Angiosperms
- Clade: Eudicots
- Clade: Asterids
- Order: Asterales
- Family: Asteraceae
- Genus: Fitchia
- Species: F. nutans

Binomial name
- Fitchia nutans Hook.f.

= Fitchia nutans =

Species of flowering plant

Fitchia nutans is a species of flowering plant in the family Asteraceae. It is endemic to the island of Tahiti in the Society Islands of French Polynesia. The species was first described by British botanist Joseph Dalton Hooker in 1845.
