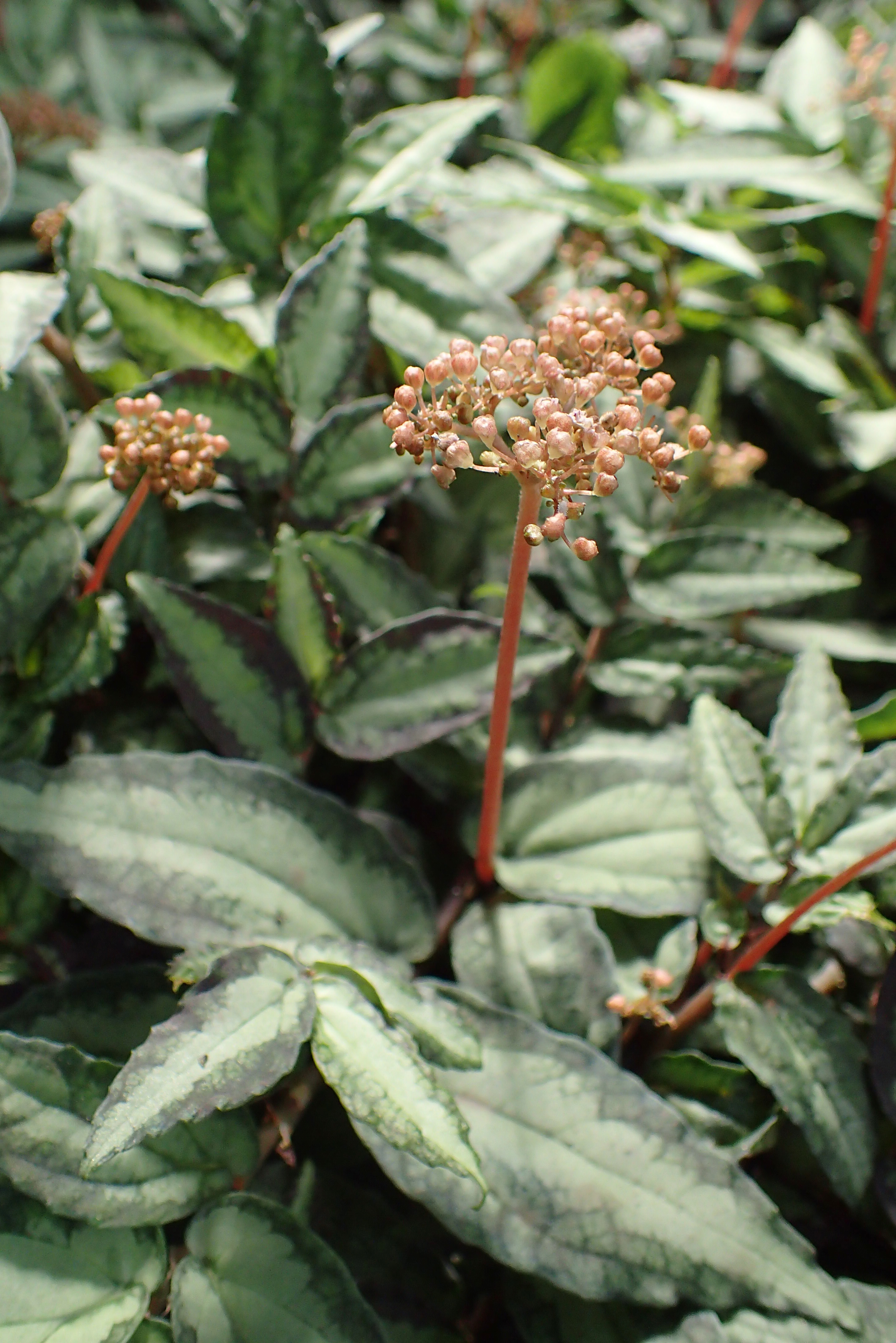

Scientific classification
- Kingdom: Plantae
- Clade: Tracheophytes
- Clade: Angiosperms
- Clade: Eudicots
- Clade: Rosids
- Order: Rosales
- Family: Urticaceae
- Genus: Procris
- Species: P. repens

Binomial name
- Procris repens (Lour.) B.J.Conn & Hadiah

Synonyms
- List: Elatostema repens (Lour.) Hallier f.; Pellionia repens (Lour.) Merr.; Polychroa repens Lour.; Begonia daveauana Godefroy; Elatostema daveauana (Godefroy) Hallier f.; Elatostema gibbosum Kurz; Elatostema pulchrum (N.E.Br.) Hallier f.; Elatostema repens var. pulchrum (N.E.Br.) H.Schroet.; Elatostema repens var. viride (N.E.Br.) H.Schroet.; Pellionia begoniifolia O.Krause; Pellionia daveauana (God.-Leb.) N.E.Br.; Pellionia daveauana var. viridis N.E.Br.; Pellionia pulchra N.E. Br.; Procris gibbosa Wall.

= Procris repens =

Species of flowering plant

Procris repens is a species of flowering plant in the nettle family, Urticaceae. It is commonly known as watermelon begonia or sisik naga, although the latter name may also refer various Pyrrosia species.

Procris repens is an interesting specimen to demonstrate the metamorphosis of chloroplasts (outward of cell) to amyloplasts (inward of cell) if studied with a microscope.

Under its synonym Elatostema repens it has won the Royal Horticultural Society's Award of Garden Merit. E. repens var. pulchrum has also won the award.

== Biology ==
=== Description ===
Procris repens is a small herbaceous creeper that can reach 15 cm (5.9 in) in height and 60 cm (24 in) in length. Its leaves have toothed edges and are usually 2.5 to 10 cm (0.98 to 3.94 in) in length and 2 to 5 cm (0.79 to 1.97 in) in width. Its distinctive leaves have a pattern that resembles watermelon rinds or the foliage of certain Begonia species and may fade to completely purple or brown with age.

=== Distribution ===
Procris repens is distributed over a wide area, from southern China to Indonesia. It mainly grows in primary forests in tropical and subtropical climates.

=== Ecology ===
Procris repens is a food plant for caterpillars of various Hypolimnas species.
