= Fitchia tahitensis =

Conservation status
- Endangered (IUCN 3.1)

Scientific classification
- Kingdom: Plantae
- Clade: Embryophytes
- Clade: Tracheophytes
- Clade: Angiosperms
- Clade: Eudicots
- Clade: Asterids
- Order: Asterales
- Family: Asteraceae
- Genus: Fitchia
- Species: F. tahitensis

Binomial name
- Fitchia tahitensis Nadeaud

Species of flowering plant

Fitchia tahitensis is a species of flowering plant in the family Asteraceae. It is endemic to the island of Tahiti in the Society Islands of French Polynesia.
