= Cyperus rapensis =

Scientific classification
- Kingdom: Plantae
- Clade: Tracheophytes
- Clade: Angiosperms
- Clade: Monocots
- Clade: Commelinids
- Order: Poales
- Family: Cyperaceae
- Genus: Cyperus
- Species: C. rapensis

Binomial name
- Cyperus rapensis F.Br. 1931

Species of sedge

Cyperus rapensis is a species of sedge that is endemic to Rapa Iti in the Tubuai Islands of French Polynesia.

== See also ==
- List of Cyperus species
