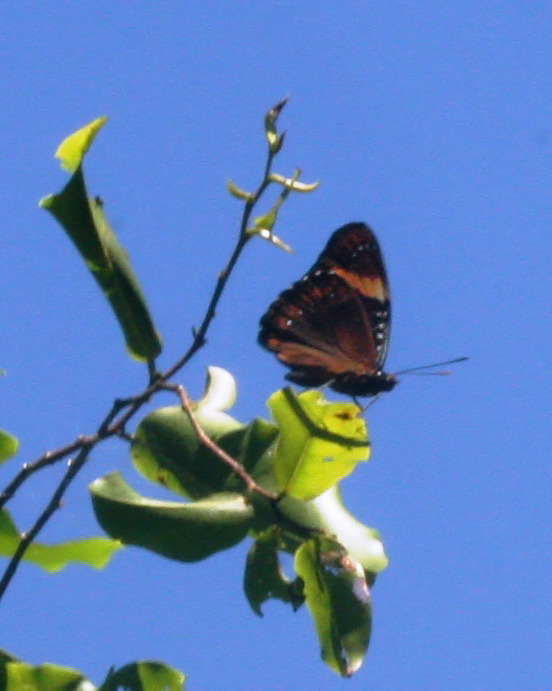
- On Guam

Conservation status
- Endangered (ESA)

Scientific classification
- Domain: Eukaryota
- Kingdom: Animalia
- Phylum: Arthropoda
- Class: Insecta
- Order: Lepidoptera
- Family: Nymphalidae
- Genus: Hypolimnas
- Species: H. octocula
- Subspecies: H. o. marianensis

Trinomial name
- Hypolimnas octocula marianensis Fruhstorfer, 1912

= Hypolimnas octocula marianensis =

Subspecies of butterfly

Hypolimnas octocula marianensis, known as the Mariana eight-spot butterfly or forest flicker, is a subspecies of Hypolimnas octocula, the eight-spot butterfly.

The species is in found on Guam and Saipan in the Mariana Islands and feeds on two host plants: Procris pedunculata and Elatostema calcareum. These two herbs grow only on karst limestone forest. It occurs with certainty only on Guam and is a candidate for listing under the Endangered Species Act. The Mariana eight-spot butterfly suffers from numerous threats, including habitat destruction, competition from introduced species and increased predation from ants and wasps.
