= Fitchia cordata =

Conservation status
- Critically Endangered (IUCN 3.1)

Scientific classification
- Kingdom: Plantae
- Clade: Tracheophytes
- Clade: Angiosperms
- Clade: Eudicots
- Clade: Asterids
- Order: Asterales
- Family: Asteraceae
- Genus: Fitchia
- Species: F. cordata

Binomial name
- Fitchia cordata M.L.Grant & Carlquist

Species of flowering plant

Fitchia cordata is a species of flowering plant in the family Asteraceae. It is a shrub or small tree endemic to the island of Bora Bora in the Society Islands of French Polynesia. It grows in lowland tropical rain forest and shrubland. It has a limited range, and a population of fewer than 50 mature individuals. It is threatened by habitat loss and degradation from frequent fires and invasive plants. The IUCN Red List assesses the species as Critically Endangered.

The species was described by Martin Lawrence Grant and Sherwin Carlquist in 1963.
