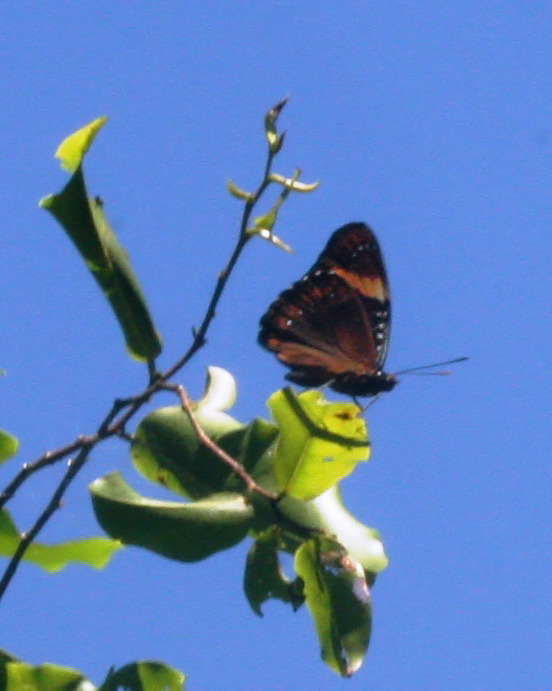
- H. o. marianensis on Guam

Scientific classification
- Domain: Eukaryota
- Kingdom: Animalia
- Phylum: Arthropoda
- Class: Insecta
- Order: Lepidoptera
- Family: Nymphalidae
- Genus: Hypolimnas
- Species: H. octocula

Binomial name
- Hypolimnas octocula Butler (1869)

= Hypolimnas octocula =

Eight-spot butterfly

Species of insect

Hypolimnas octocula, the eight-spot butterfly, is a species of eggfly or diadem endemic to several islands and island chains in Oceania, including New Caledonia, Vanuatu and the Mariana Islands.

It includes the following subspecies:

- H. o. octocula Butler, 1869
- H. o. pallas Grose-Smith
- H. o. elsina Butler
- H. o. formosa Herrich-Schäffer
- H. o. marianensis
