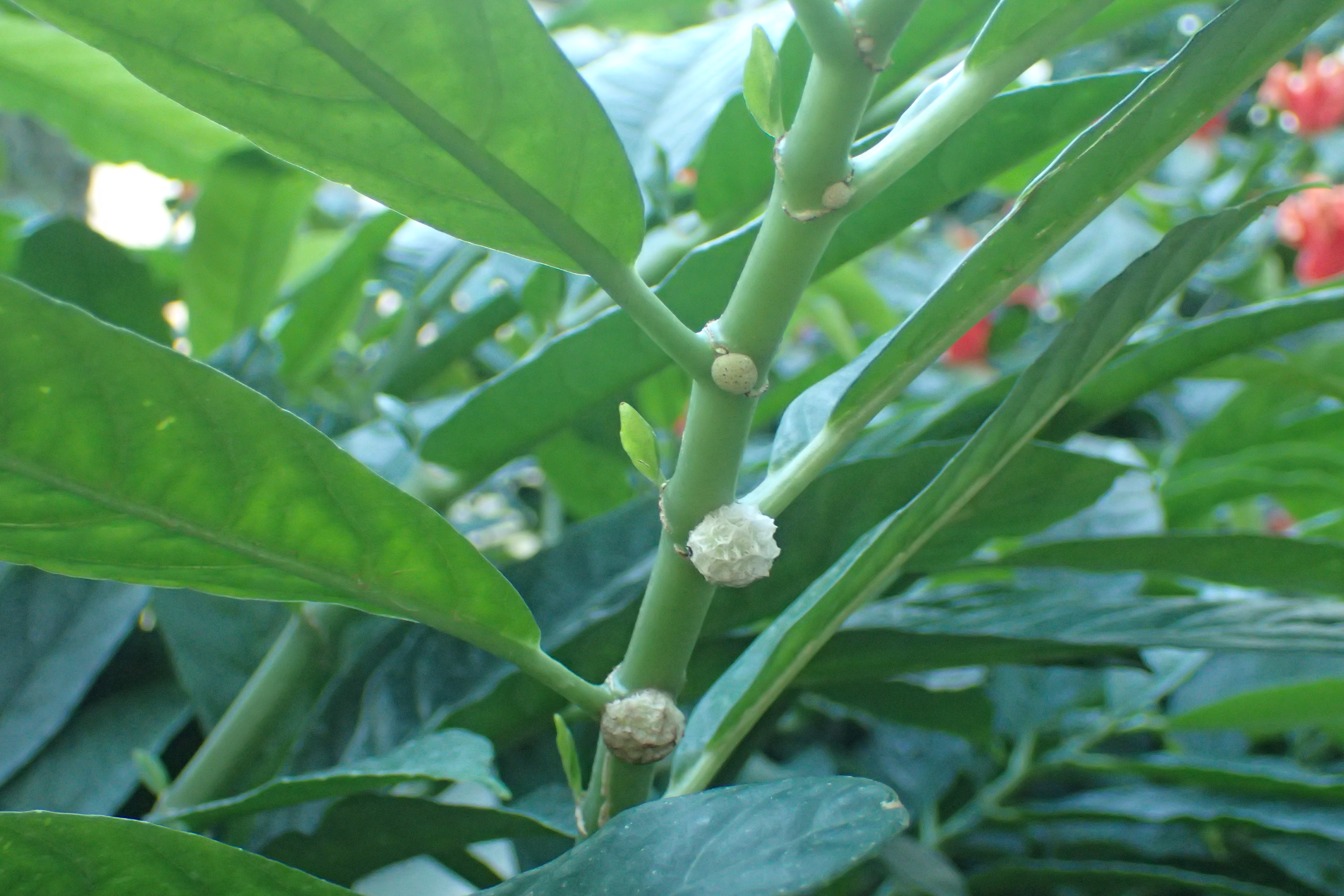
- Procris frutescens

Scientific classification
- Kingdom: Plantae
- Clade: Tracheophytes
- Clade: Angiosperms
- Clade: Eudicots
- Clade: Rosids
- Order: Rosales
- Family: Urticaceae
- Genus: Procris; Comm. ex Juss. (1789)

Species
- 24; see text

Synonyms
- Polychroa Lour. (1790); Sciophila Gaudich. (1830)

= Procris (plant) =

Genus of flowering plants

Procris is a genus of flowering plants in the family Urticaceae. It includes 24 species native to tropical Africa, tropical Asia, New Guinea, and Queensland.

== Species ==
24 species are accepted.

- Procris acaulis (Hook.f.) B.J.Conn & Hadiah
- Procris anfracta (A.C.Sm.) A.C.Sm.
- Procris archboldiana A.C.Sm.
- Procris boninensis Tuyama
- Procris brunnea Merr.
- Procris crenata C.B.Rob.
- Procris curtisii (Ridl.) B.J.Conn & Hadiah
- Procris decurrens (H.J.P.Winkl.) R.J.Johns
- Procris dolichophylla Merr.
- Procris frutescens Blume
- Procris goepeliana (A.C.Sm.) A.C.Sm.
- Procris grueningii (H.J.P.Winkl.) H.Schroet.
- Procris insularis H.Schroet.
- Procris langbianensis Gagnep.
- Procris mindanaensis H.Schroet.
- Procris pedunculata (J.R.Forst. & G.Forst.) Wedd.
- Procris pilifera (H.J.P.Winkl.) H.Schroet.
- Procris puberula (Hallier f.) H.Schroet.
- Procris rectangularis (H.J.P.Winkl.) R.J.Johns
- Procris repens (Lour.) B.J.Conn & Hadiah
- Procris reticulatovenosa (Hallier f.) H.Schroet.
- Procris ruhlandii H.Schroet.
- Procris urdanetensis Elmer
- Procris visciformis (Hallier f.) H.Schroet.
