= Bulbophyllum adolphii =

Scientific classification
- Kingdom: Plantae
- Clade: Tracheophytes
- Clade: Angiosperms
- Clade: Monocots
- Order: Asparagales
- Family: Orchidaceae
- Subfamily: Epidendroideae
- Genus: Bulbophyllum
- Species: B. adolphii

Binomial name
- Bulbophyllum adolphii Schltr.

Species of orchid

Bulbophyllum adolphii is a species of orchid in the genus Bulbophyllum. The epithet adolphi commemorates Adolf Kempter, who collected the type specimen.
