= Oparanthus rapensis =

Conservation status
- Least Concern (IUCN 2.3)

Scientific classification
- Kingdom: Plantae
- Clade: Tracheophytes
- Clade: Angiosperms
- Clade: Eudicots
- Clade: Asterids
- Order: Asterales
- Family: Asteraceae
- Genus: Oparanthus
- Species: O. rapensis

Binomial name
- Oparanthus rapensis (F.Br.) Sherff (1937)

Species of flowering plant

Oparanthus rapensis is a species of flowering plant in the family Asteraceae. It is endemic to the island of Rapa Iti in the Tubuai Islands of French Polynesia.
