= Pterophylla rapensis =

Conservation status
- Vulnerable (IUCN 3.1)

Scientific classification
- Kingdom: Plantae
- Clade: Tracheophytes
- Clade: Angiosperms
- Clade: Eudicots
- Clade: Rosids
- Order: Oxalidales
- Family: Cunoniaceae
- Genus: Pterophylla
- Species: P. rapensis

Binomial name
- Pterophylla rapensis (F.Br.) Pillon & H.C.Hopkins

Synonyms
- Weinmannia rapensis F.Br.

Species of flowering plant

Pterophylla rapensis, formerly known as Weinmannia rapensis, is a species of flowering plant in the family Cunoniaceae. It is a tree endemic to Rapa Iti in the Tubuai Islands of French Polynesia.
