= Phyllanthus raivavensis =

Conservation status
- Near Threatened (IUCN 3.1)

Scientific classification
- Kingdom: Plantae
- Clade: Embryophytes
- Clade: Tracheophytes
- Clade: Spermatophytes
- Clade: Angiosperms
- Clade: Eudicots
- Clade: Rosids
- Order: Malpighiales
- Family: Phyllanthaceae
- Genus: Phyllanthus
- Species: P. raivavensis

Binomial name
- Phyllanthus raivavensis (F.Br.) W.L.Wagner & Lorence (2011)

Synonyms
- Glochidion raivavense F.Br.

Species of flowering plant

Phyllanthus raivavensis, also known by its synonym Glochidion raivavense or by the local name mahame on the island of Tubuai, is a species of plant in the family Phyllanthaceae. It is a shrub or tree endemic to the Austral Islands in French Polynesia, where it is native to the islands of Rurutu, Tubuai, and Raivavae. It grows in lowland tropical moist forest. It is threatened by predation and habitat degradation from introduced goats and by competition from invasive plants.

The species was first described as Glochidion raivavense by Forest B. H. Brown in 1935. In 2011 Warren Lambert Wagner and David H. Lorence placed the species in genus Phyllanthus as P. raivavensis.
