= Fitchia (plant) =

- Fitchia speciosa

Scientific classification
- Kingdom: Plantae
- Clade: Tracheophytes
- Clade: Angiosperms
- Clade: Eudicots
- Clade: Asterids
- Order: Asterales
- Family: Asteraceae
- Subfamily: Asteroideae
- Tribe: Coreopsideae
- Genus: Fitchia; Hook.f.

Type species
- Fitchia nutans Hook.f.

Genus of flowering plants

Fitchia is a genus of flowering plants in the sunflower family, native to certain islands in the Pacific.

Species

- Fitchia cordata M.L.Grant & Carlq. - Bora Bora
- Fitchia cuneata J.W.Moore - Raiatea, Tahaa
- Fitchia mangarevensis F.Br. - Tuamotu
- Fitchia nutans Hook.f. - Tahiti
- Fitchia rapensis F.Br. - Tubuai
- Fitchia speciosa Cheeseman - Cook Islands; naturalized in Hawaii
- Fitchia tahitensis Nadeaud - Tahiti
