= Metatrophis =

Conservation status
- Critically Endangered (IUCN 3.1)

Scientific classification
- Kingdom: Plantae
- Clade: Embryophytes
- Clade: Tracheophytes
- Clade: Angiosperms
- Clade: Eudicots
- Clade: Rosids
- Order: Rosales
- Family: Urticaceae
- Genus: Metatrophis; F.Br. (1935)
- Species: M. margaretae

Binomial name
- Metatrophis margaretae F.Br. (1935)

Genus of flowering plants

Metatrophis is a genus of plant in the nettle family, Urticaceae. Its only species is Metatrophis margaretae, a shrub or small tree endemic to the island of Rapa Iti in the Tubuai Islands. It grows in lowland tropical rain forest, where it threatened by predation by introduced goats, competition from invasive plants, and increased fire frequency. The IUCN Red List assesses the species as Critically Endangered.
