= Acalypha raivavensis =

Conservation status
- Critically Endangered (IUCN 3.1)

Scientific classification
- Kingdom: Plantae
- Clade: Tracheophytes
- Clade: Angiosperms
- Clade: Eudicots
- Clade: Rosids
- Order: Malpighiales
- Family: Euphorbiaceae
- Subtribe: Acalyphinae
- Genus: Acalypha
- Species: A. raivavensis

Binomial name
- Acalypha raivavensis F.Br. (1935)

Species of flowering plant

Acalypha raivavensis is a species of plant in the family Euphorbiaceae. It is a shrub or tree endemic to the islands of Raivavae and Tubuai in the Tubuai Islands of French Polynesia.

The species was described by Forest B. H. Brown in 1935.

== See also ==
- Flora of Tubuai
