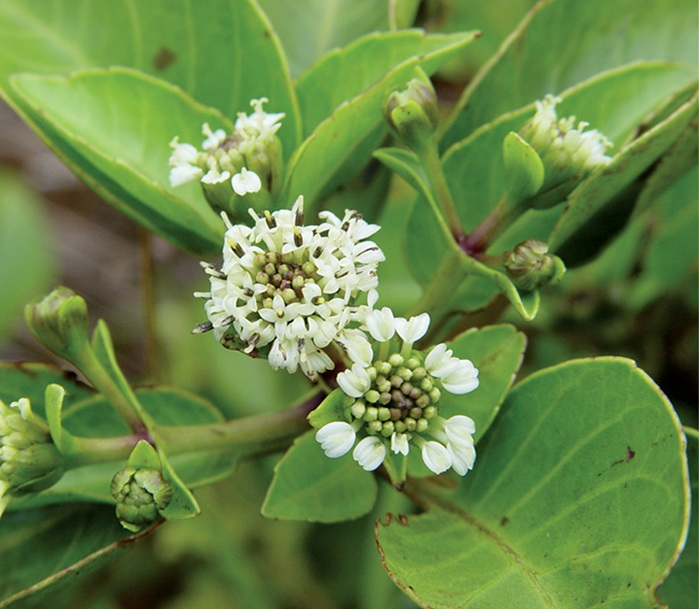
- Oparanthus hivaoanus

Scientific classification
- Kingdom: Plantae
- Clade: Tracheophytes
- Clade: Angiosperms
- Clade: Eudicots
- Clade: Asterids
- Order: Asterales
- Family: Asteraceae
- Subfamily: Asteroideae
- Tribe: Coreopsideae
- Genus: Oparanthus; Sherff

= Oparanthus =

Genus of flowering plants

Oparanthus is a genus of flowering plant in the family Asteraceae, native to the islands of French Polynesia.

Species

- Oparanthus albus (F.Br.) Sherff - Marquesas
- Oparanthus coriaceus (F.Br.) Sherff - Rapa Iti
- Oparanthus hivoanus (O.Deg. & Sherff) R.K.Shannon & W.L.Wagner - Marquesas
- Oparanthus intermedius Sherff - Rapa Iti
- Oparanthus rapensis (F.Br.) Sherff- Rapa Iti
- Oparanthus teikiteetinii (J.Florence & Stuessy) R.K.Shannon & W.L.Wagner - Marquesas
- Oparanthus tiva W.L.Wagner & Lorence - Marquesas
- Oparanthus woodii W.L.Wagner & Lorence - Marquesas
