= Oparanthus coriaceus =

Conservation status
- Least Concern (IUCN 2.3)

Scientific classification
- Kingdom: Plantae
- Clade: Tracheophytes
- Clade: Angiosperms
- Clade: Eudicots
- Clade: Asterids
- Order: Asterales
- Family: Asteraceae
- Genus: Oparanthus
- Species: O. coriaceus

Binomial name
- Oparanthus coriaceus (F.Br.) Sherff (1937)

Synonyms
- Bidens tubuaiensis Stuessy (1988); Chrysogonum coriaceum F.Br. (1935)

Species of flowering plant

Oparanthus coriaceus is a species of flowering plant in the family Asteraceae. It is endemic to the island of Rapa Iti in the Tubuai Islands of French Polynesia.
