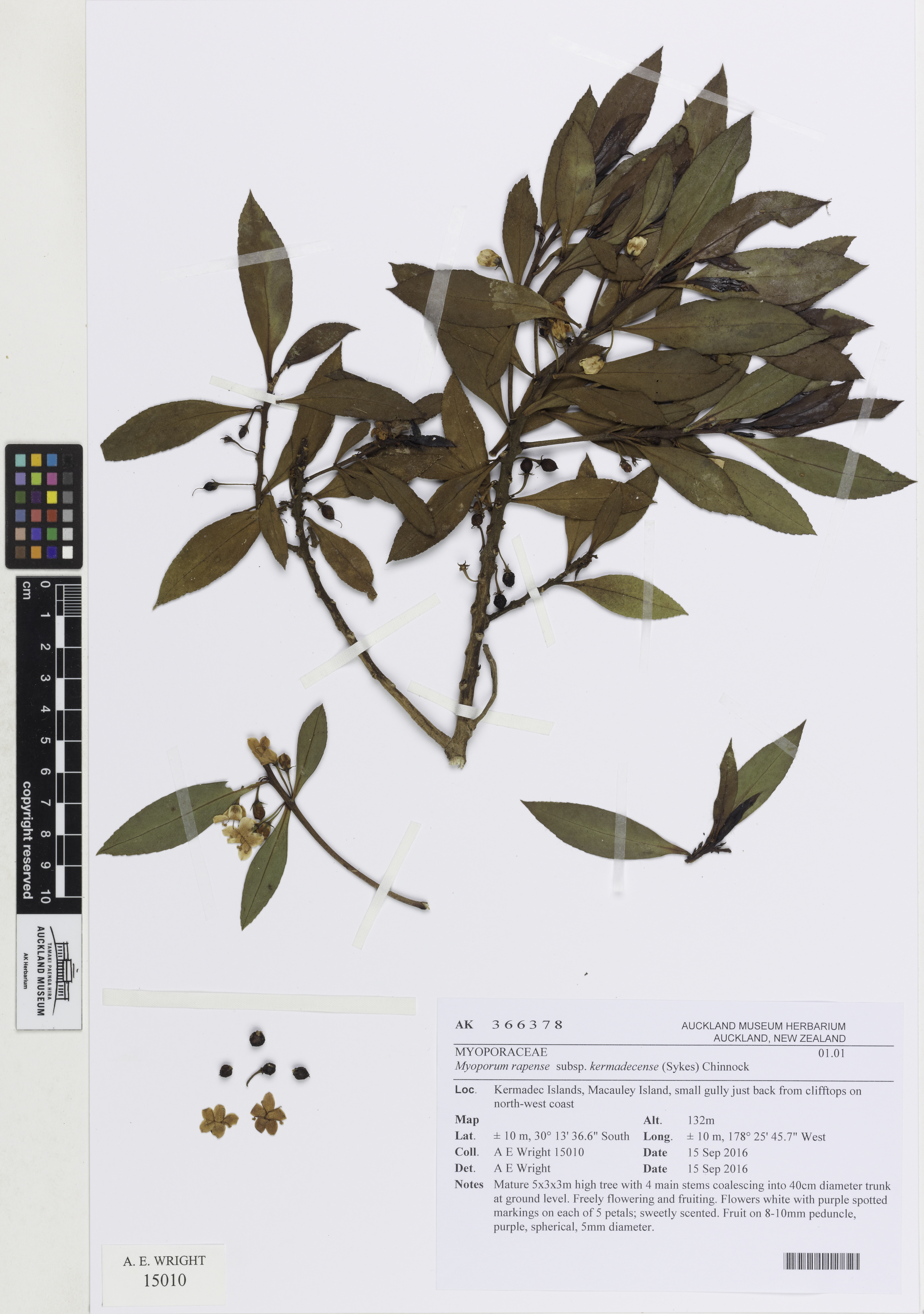
- Myoporum rapense subsp. kermadecense herbarium specimen from the Auckland War Memorial Museum

Conservation status
- Least Concern (IUCN 2.3)

Scientific classification
- Kingdom: Plantae
- Clade: Embryophytes
- Clade: Tracheophytes
- Clade: Angiosperms
- Clade: Eudicots
- Clade: Asterids
- Order: Lamiales
- Family: Scrophulariaceae
- Genus: Myoporum
- Species: M. rapense

Binomial name
- Myoporum rapense F.Br.

= Myoporum rapense =

Species of flowering plant

Myoporum rapense is a plant in the figwort family, Scrophulariaceae and is endemic to French Polynesia and the Kermadec Islands. It is closely related to Myoporum laetum and there are two subspecies which are found on different island groups.

== Description ==
Myoporum rapense is sometimes a low shrub and sometimes a tree growing to a height of 13 metres (40 ft) with branches that have raised leaf scars. The leaves are arranged alternately and are 30–155 millimetres (1–6 in) long, 7–56 millimetres (0.3–2 in) wide, the same colour on both surfaces and have margins that are usually more or less serrated, especially on the outer half to three-quarters.

The flowers are borne singly or in groups of up to 5 in the axils of leaves on stalks 6–20 millimetres (0.2–0.8 in) long and have 5 pointed sepals and 5 petals forming a bell-shaped tube. The tube is 3.5–7 millimetres (0.1–0.3 in) long with lobes about the same length or slightly shorter. The tube is white, usually spotted pale purple and is hairy inside and on the inner parts of the lobes. There are four stamens which extend beyond the petal tube. Flowers are usually present throughout the year and are followed by the fruit which is an oval-shaped, red, mauve or sometimes white drupe.

== Taxonomy ==
Myoporum rapense was first formally described in 1935 by Forest B. H. Brown and the description was published in Bernice P. Bishop Museum Bulletin. The specific epithet rapense refers to Rapa Island where the type specimen was collected by W.R.Sykes.

There are two subspecies:

- Myoproum rapense F.Br. subsp. rapense which has smooth leaves and red fruit and occurs on Raivavae, Rapa and Tubuai islands in the Austral Islands of French Polynesia;
- Myoporum rapense subsp. kermadecense (W.R.Sykes) Chinnock which has leaves that have oil dots in the leaves and violet, purple or white fruits and occurs on islands in the Kermadec group.

== Distribution and habitat ==
Myoporum rapense is found on the Austral and Kermadec Islands where it grows in coastal scrub, woodland, sand dunes or volcanic soils often on rocky hillsides.

== Conservation ==
Myoporum rapense is listed as being of "least concern" in the IUCN Red List.
