= Elizabeth Dorothy Wuist Brown =

American botanist (1880–1972)

- Born: 1880
- Died: 1972 (aged 91–92)
- Spouse: Forest Buffen Harkness Brown
- Scientific career
- Fields: Apogamy in plants
- Author abbrev. (botany): E.D.Br

Elizabeth Dorothy Wuist Brown (1880–1972) was an American botanist noted for studying apogamy in plants, as well as flora of New Zealand, French Polynesia, and Hawaii. She was married to botanist Forest Buffen Harkness Brown, with whom she was a coauthor. The standard author abbreviation E.D.Br. is used to indicate this person as the author when citing a botanical name.

== Works ==
- Brown, Elizabeth Dorothy Wuist (1919). "Apogamy in Camptosorus rhizophyllus". Bulletin of the Torrey Botanical Club. 46 (1): 27–30. doi:10.2307/2479646. JSTOR 2479646.
- Brown, Elizabeth Dorothy Wuist (1920). "Apogamy in Osmunda cinnamomea and O. Claytoniana". Bulletin of the Torrey Botanical Club. 47 (8): 339–345. doi:10.2307/2480257. JSTOR 2480257.
- Brown, Forest B. H; Brown, Elizabeth D. W (1931). Flora of southeastern Polynesia. OCLC 3831491.
- Brown, Elizabeth D. W. Polynesian leis. OCLC 16327677.
- Brown, Elizabeth Dorothy Wuist (1918). Regeneration in Phegopteris polypodioides (in German). éditeur non identifié.
