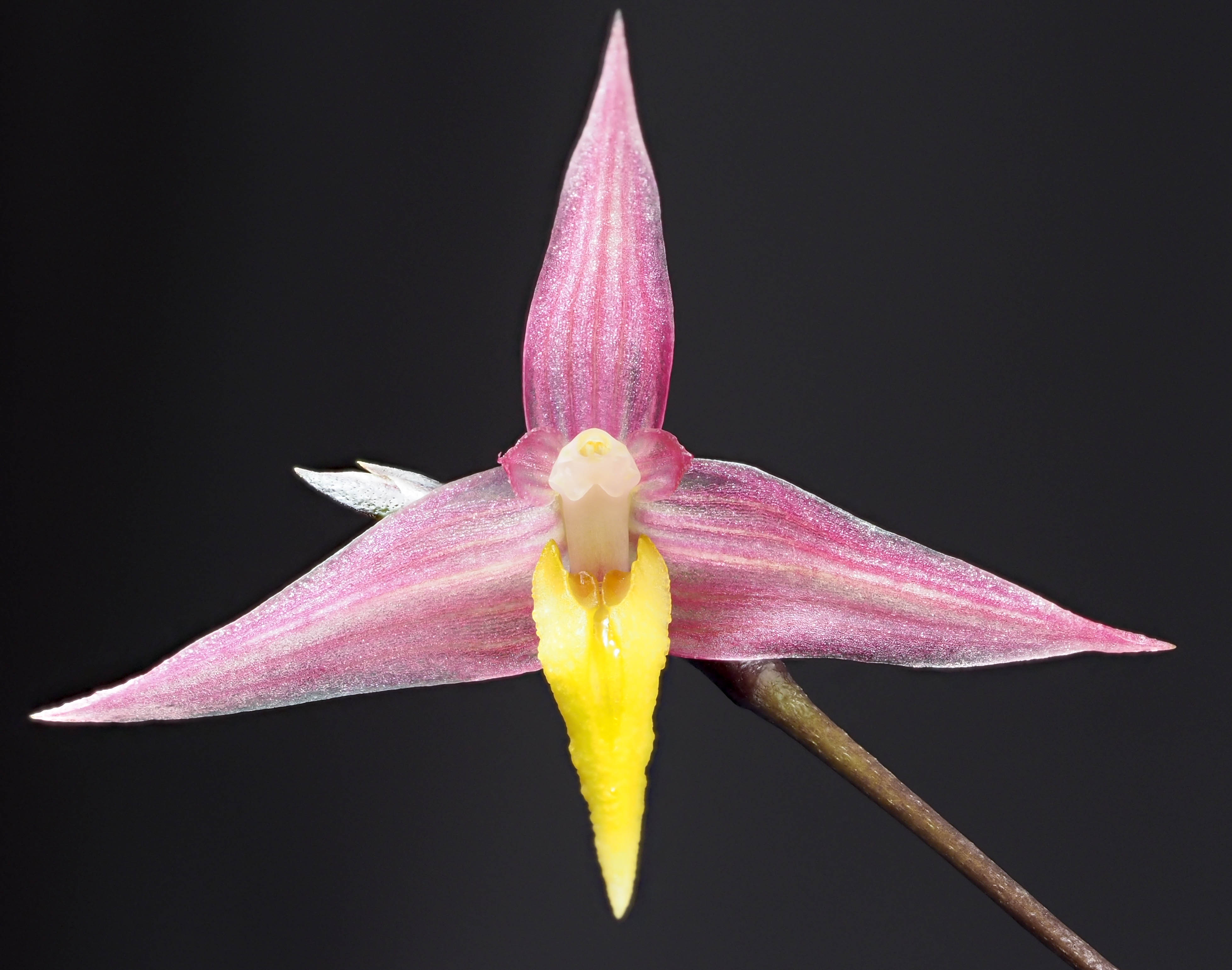

Scientific classification
- Kingdom: Plantae
- Clade: Embryophytes
- Clade: Tracheophytes
- Clade: Spermatophytes
- Clade: Angiosperms
- Clade: Monocots
- Order: Asparagales
- Family: Orchidaceae
- Subfamily: Epidendroideae
- Genus: Bulbophyllum
- Species: B. andreeae

Binomial name
- Bulbophyllum andreeae A.D.Hawkes

= Bulbophyllum andreeae =

Species of orchid

Bulbophyllum andreeae is a species of orchid in the genus Bulbophyllum. It was described by Alex Drum Hawkes in 1956. It is found in Maluku, New Guinea, the Solomon Islands and Sulawesi.
