= Bulbophyllum hamadryas =

Scientific classification
- Kingdom: Plantae
- Clade: Tracheophytes
- Clade: Angiosperms
- Clade: Monocots
- Order: Asparagales
- Family: Orchidaceae
- Subfamily: Epidendroideae
- Genus: Bulbophyllum
- Species: B. hamadryas

Binomial name
- Bulbophyllum hamadryas Schltr.

Species of orchid

Bulbophyllum hamadryas is a species of orchid in the genus Bulbophyllum.

== Var. ==
- Bulbophyllum hamadryas var. hamadryas
- Bulbophyllum hamadryas var. orientale Schltr.
