= Allophylus rapensis =

Conservation status
- Data Deficient (IUCN 2.3)

Scientific classification
- Kingdom: Plantae
- Clade: Tracheophytes
- Clade: Angiosperms
- Clade: Eudicots
- Clade: Rosids
- Order: Sapindales
- Family: Sapindaceae
- Genus: Allophylus
- Species: A. rapensis

Binomial name
- Allophylus rapensis F.Br. (1935)

Species of flowering plant

Allophylus rapensis is a species of plant in the family Sapindaceae. It is a shrub or tree endemic to the island of Rapa Iti, in the Tubuai Islands of French Polynesia.
