= Pittosporum rapense =

Conservation status
- Least Concern (IUCN 2.3)

Scientific classification
- Kingdom: Plantae
- Clade: Tracheophytes
- Clade: Angiosperms
- Clade: Eudicots
- Clade: Asterids
- Order: Apiales
- Family: Pittosporaceae
- Genus: Pittosporum
- Species: P. rapense

Binomial name
- Pittosporum rapense F.Br. (1935)

Species of flowering plant

Pittosporum rapense is a species of plant in the Pittosporaceae family. It is endemic to the island of Rapa Iti in the Tubuai Islands of French Polynesia.
