= Carex rapaensis =

Scientific classification
- Kingdom: Plantae
- Clade: Tracheophytes
- Clade: Angiosperms
- Clade: Monocots
- Clade: Commelinids
- Order: Poales
- Family: Cyperaceae
- Genus: Carex
- Species: C. rapaensis

Binomial name
- Carex rapaensis (H.St.John) K.L.Wilson

Synonyms
- Uncinia rapaensis H.St.John

Species of grass-like plant

Carex rapaensis is a perennial sedge of the Cyperaceae family that is native to the Pacific Island of Tubuai.

== See also ==
- List of Carex species
