= Serianthes rurutensis =

Conservation status
- Endangered (IUCN 3.1)

Scientific classification
- Kingdom: Plantae
- Clade: Tracheophytes
- Clade: Angiosperms
- Clade: Eudicots
- Clade: Rosids
- Order: Fabales
- Family: Fabaceae
- Subfamily: Caesalpinioideae
- Clade: Mimosoid clade
- Genus: Serianthes
- Species: S. rurutensis

Binomial name
- Serianthes rurutensis (F.Br.) I.C.Nielsen (1983)

Synonyms
- Serianthes myriadenia var. rurutensis F.Br. (1935)

Species of legume

Serianthes rurutensis is a species of flowering plant in the family Fabaceae. It is a tree endemic to the islands of Rurutu and Raivavae in the Tubuai Islands of French Polynesia.
