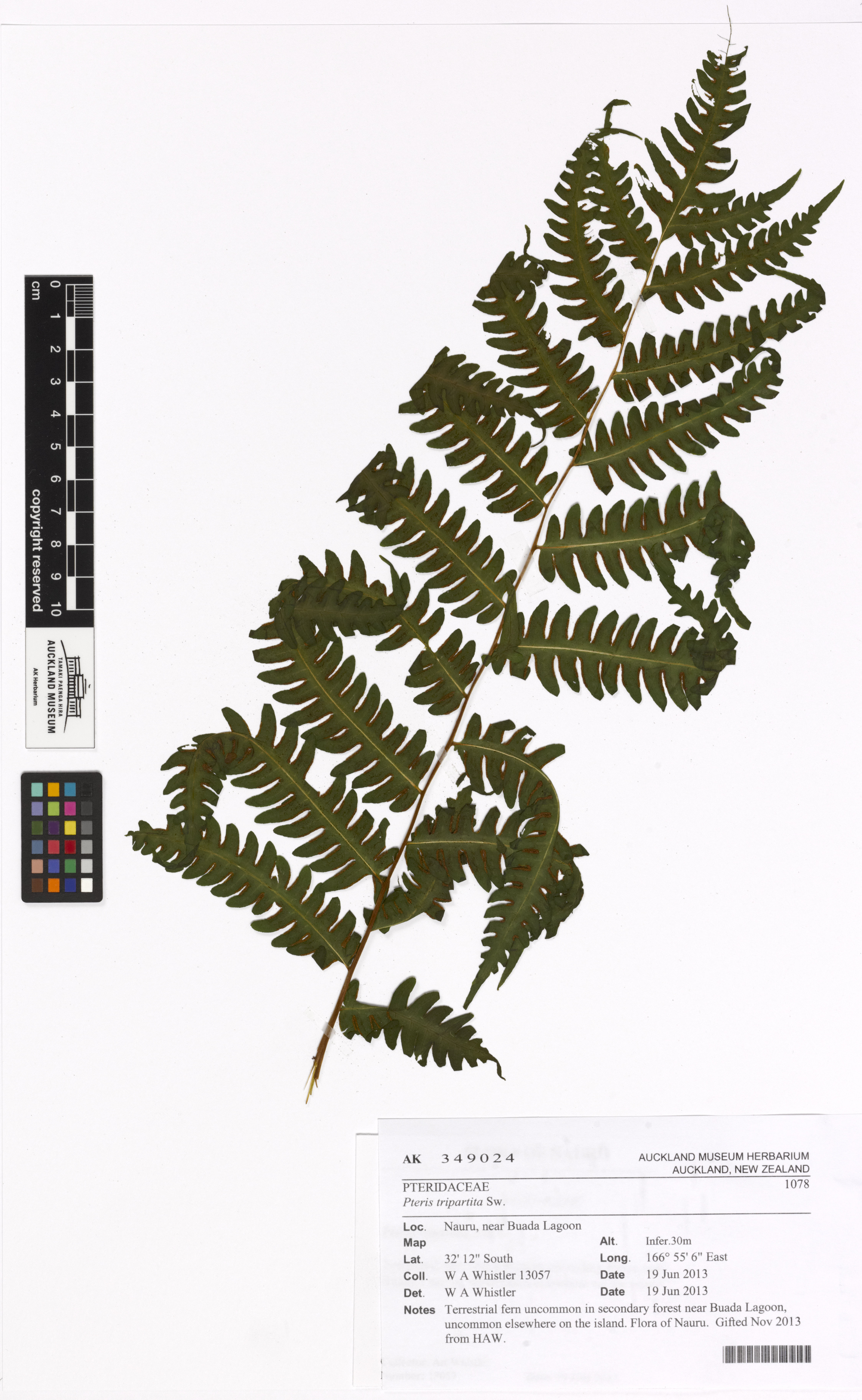

Scientific classification
- Kingdom: Plantae
- Clade: Tracheophytes
- Division: Polypodiophyta
- Class: Polypodiopsida
- Order: Polypodiales
- Family: Pteridaceae
- Genus: Pteris
- Species: P. tripartita

Binomial name
- Pteris tripartita Sw. (1801)

Subspecies
- Pteris tripartita var. marquesensis E.D.Br.; Pteris tripartita var. raivavensis E.D.Br.; Pteris tripartita var. tripartita

Synonyms
- Litobrochia tripartita (Sw.) C.Presl (1836)

= Pteris tripartita =

Species of fern

Pteris tripartita is a species of fern native to tropical Africa, south and southeast Asia, Malesia, Papuasia, Queensland (Australia) and the South Pacific islands.

== Subspecies ==
Three subspecies are accepted.

- Pteris tripartita var. marquesensis E.D.Br. – Marquesas (Hiva Oa and Fatu Hiva)
- Pteris tripartita var. raivavensis E.D.Br. – Tubuai Islands (Raivavae)
- Pteris tripartita var. tripartita – tropical Africa, south and southeast Asia, Malesia, Papuasia, Queensland, and the South Pacific islands.
