= Gymnosporia pertinax =

Scientific classification
- Kingdom: Plantae
- Clade: Tracheophytes
- Clade: Angiosperms
- Clade: Eudicots
- Clade: Rosids
- Order: Celastrales
- Family: Celastraceae
- Genus: Gymnosporia
- Species: G. pertinax

Binomial name
- Gymnosporia pertinax (N.Hallé & J.Florence) M.P.Simmons (2011)

Synonyms
- Maytenus pertinax N.Hallé & J.Florence (1986 publ. 1987)

Species of plant

Gymnosporia pertinax is a species of flowering plant in the family Celastraceae. It is a scrambling shrub endemic to the island of Rapa Iti in the Tubuai Islands of French Polynesia.
