= Apostates rapae =

Scientific classification
- Kingdom: Plantae
- Clade: Embryophytes
- Clade: Tracheophytes
- Clade: Angiosperms
- Clade: Eudicots
- Clade: Asterids
- Order: Asterales
- Family: Asteraceae
- Subfamily: Asteroideae
- Tribe: Bahieae
- Genus: Apostates; N.S.Lander
- Species: A. rapae

Binomial name
- Apostates rapae (F.Br.) N.S.Lander (1989)

Synonyms
- Olearia rapae F.Br. (1935)

Species of flowering plant

Apostates is a genus of flowering plants in the daisy family.

There is only one known species, Apostates rapae, endemic to Rapa Iti in the Austral Islands of French Polynesia.
