= Plantago rapensis =

Scientific classification
- Kingdom: Plantae
- Clade: Tracheophytes
- Clade: Angiosperms
- Clade: Eudicots
- Clade: Asterids
- Order: Lamiales
- Family: Plantaginaceae
- Genus: Plantago
- Species: P. rapensis

Binomial name
- Plantago rapensis F.Br.

Species of flowering plant

Plantago rapensis is a species of flowering plant in the family Plantaginaceae. It is found only on Rapa Iti.
