= Sophora rapaensis =

Conservation status
- Data Deficient (IUCN 2.3)

Scientific classification
- Kingdom: Plantae
- Clade: Tracheophytes
- Clade: Angiosperms
- Clade: Eudicots
- Clade: Rosids
- Order: Fabales
- Family: Fabaceae
- Subfamily: Faboideae
- Genus: Sophora
- Species: S. rapaensis

Binomial name
- Sophora rapaensis H.St.John (1985)

Species of legume

Sophora rapaensis is a species of flowering plant in the family Fabaceae. It is a tree endemic to the island of Rapa Iti in the Tubuai Islands of French Polynesia.
