= Sophora raivavaeensis =

Conservation status
- Critically Endangered (IUCN 3.1)

Scientific classification
- Kingdom: Plantae
- Clade: Tracheophytes
- Clade: Angiosperms
- Clade: Eudicots
- Clade: Rosids
- Order: Fabales
- Family: Fabaceae
- Subfamily: Faboideae
- Genus: Sophora
- Species: S. raivavaeensis

Binomial name
- Sophora raivavaeensis H.St.John

Species of legume

Sophora raivavaeensis is a species of flowering plant in the family Fabaceae. It is a tree endemic to Raivavae in the Tubuai Islands of French Polynesia. It grows in humid shrubland, on cliffs and rock outcrops. The population is estimated at fewer than 250 mature individuals, and the IUCN Red List assesses the species as Critically Endangered.

The species was first described by Harold St. John in 1985.
