= Pacifigeron =

Scientific classification
- Kingdom: Plantae
- Clade: Tracheophytes
- Clade: Angiosperms
- Clade: Eudicots
- Clade: Asterids
- Order: Asterales
- Family: Asteraceae
- Subfamily: Asteroideae
- Tribe: Astereae
- Subtribe: Baccharidinae
- Genus: Pacifigeron; G.L.Nesom (1994)

Genus of plants

Pacifigeron is a genus of flowering plants belonging to the family Asteraceae. It is endemic to the Tubuai Islands.

== Species ==
Species:

- Pacifigeron indivisus Saldivia
- Pacifigeron rapensis (F.Br.) G.L.Nesom
