= Pittosporum raivavaeense =

Conservation status
- Critically Endangered (IUCN 3.1)

Scientific classification
- Kingdom: Plantae
- Clade: Tracheophytes
- Clade: Angiosperms
- Clade: Eudicots
- Clade: Asterids
- Order: Apiales
- Family: Pittosporaceae
- Genus: Pittosporum
- Species: P. raivavaeense

Binomial name
- Pittosporum raivavaeense H.St.John (1977)

Species of flowering plant

Pittosporum raivavaeense is a species of plant in the Pittosporaceae family. It is a tree endemic to the island of Raivavae, in the Tubuai Islands of French Polynesia.
