= Santalum insulare =

Conservation status
- Endangered (IUCN 3.1)

Scientific classification
- Kingdom: Plantae
- Clade: Embryophytes
- Clade: Tracheophytes
- Clade: Angiosperms
- Clade: Eudicots
- Order: Santalales
- Family: Santalaceae
- Genus: Santalum
- Species: S. insulare

Binomial name
- Santalum insulare Bertero ex A.DC. (1857)

Varieties
- 7; see text

Species of plant

Santalum insulare is a species of flowering plant in family Santalaceae. It is a shrub or tree native to the south-central Pacific, including the Cook Islands, Marquesas Islands, Pitcairn Islands, Society Islands, and Tubuai Islands.

Seven varieties are recognized:

- Santalum insulare var. alticola Fosberg & Sachet – Society Islands
- Santalum insulare var. hendersonense (F.Br.) Fosberg & Sachet – Henderson Island (Pitcairn Islands)
- Santalum insulare var. insulare – Miti'aro (Cook Islands), Society Islands, and Tubuai Islands
- Santalum insulare var. marchionense (Skottsb.) Skottsb. – Marquesas
- Santalum insulare var. margaretae (F.Br.) Skottsb. – Rapa Iti (Tubuai Islands)
- Santalum insulare var. raiateense (J.W.Moore) Fosberg & Sachet – Raiatea (Society Islands)
- Santalum insulare var. raivavense F.Br. Raivavae (Tubuai Islands)
