= Psychotria raivavaensis =

Conservation status
- Least Concern (IUCN 2.3)

Scientific classification
- Kingdom: Plantae
- Clade: Tracheophytes
- Clade: Angiosperms
- Clade: Eudicots
- Clade: Asterids
- Order: Gentianales
- Family: Rubiaceae
- Genus: Psychotria
- Species: P. raivavaensis

Binomial name
- Psychotria raivavaensis Fosberg (1937)

Species of plant

Psychotria raivavaensis is a species of plant in the family Rubiaceae. It is a shrub endemic to the island of Raivavae in the Tubuai Islands of French Polynesia.
