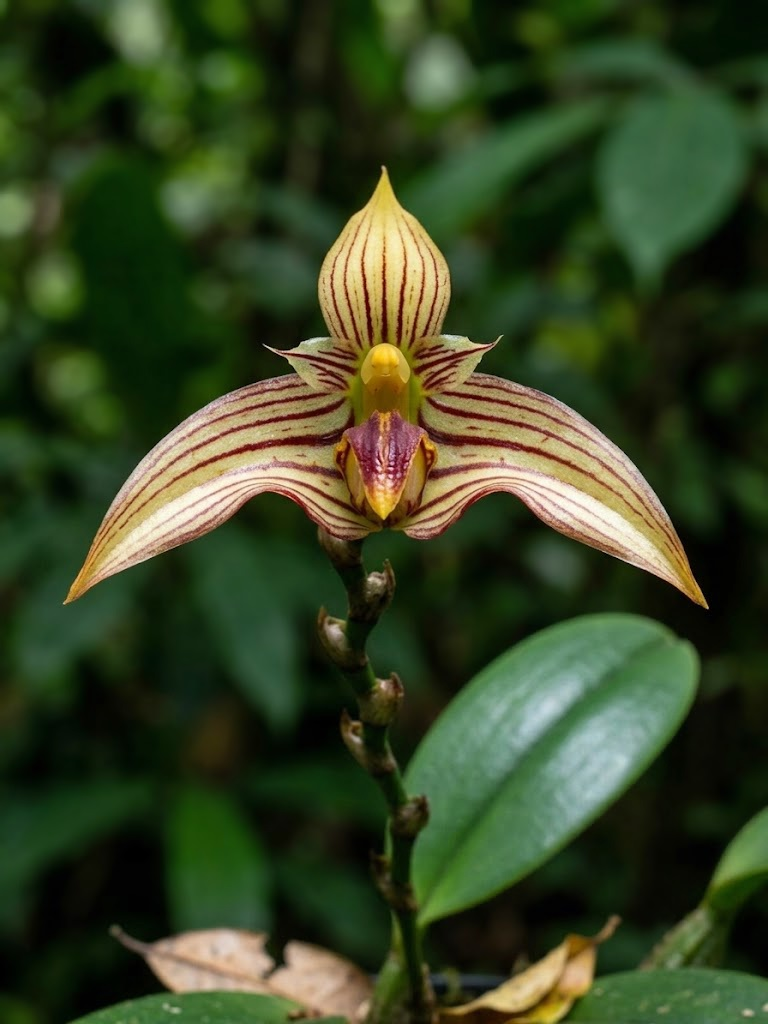

Scientific classification
- Kingdom: Plantae
- Clade: Embryophytes
- Clade: Tracheophytes
- Clade: Spermatophytes
- Clade: Angiosperms
- Clade: Monocots
- Order: Asparagales
- Family: Orchidaceae
- Subfamily: Epidendroideae
- Genus: Bulbophyllum
- Species: B. tahitense

Binomial name
- Bulbophyllum tahitense Nadeaud 1873

= Bulbophyllum tahitense =

Species of orchid

Bulbophyllum tahitense is a species of orchid in the genus Bulbophyllum found in East Polynesia and the Society Island (Tahiti, Moorea, Raiatea, Tahaa, Huahine, Bora Bora) at elevations of 70–800 meters.
