= Ixora raivavaensis =

Conservation status
- Endangered (IUCN 3.1)

Scientific classification
- Kingdom: Plantae
- Clade: Tracheophytes
- Clade: Angiosperms
- Clade: Eudicots
- Clade: Asterids
- Order: Gentianales
- Family: Rubiaceae
- Genus: Ixora
- Species: I. raivavaensis

Binomial name
- Ixora raivavaensis Fosberg (1937)

Species of plant

Ixora raivavaensis is a species of flowering plant in the family Rubiaceae. It is a tree endemic to Raivavae in the Tubuai Islands of French Polynesia, hence its name.
