= Meryta choristantha =

Conservation status
- Vulnerable (IUCN 2.3)

Scientific classification
- Kingdom: Plantae
- Clade: Tracheophytes
- Clade: Angiosperms
- Clade: Eudicots
- Clade: Asterids
- Order: Apiales
- Family: Araliaceae
- Genus: Meryta
- Species: M. choristantha

Binomial name
- Meryta choristantha Harms (1938)

Species of plant

Meryta choristantha is a species of plant in the family Araliaceae. It is a tree endemic to the island of Rapa Iti in the Tubuai Islands of French Polynesia.
