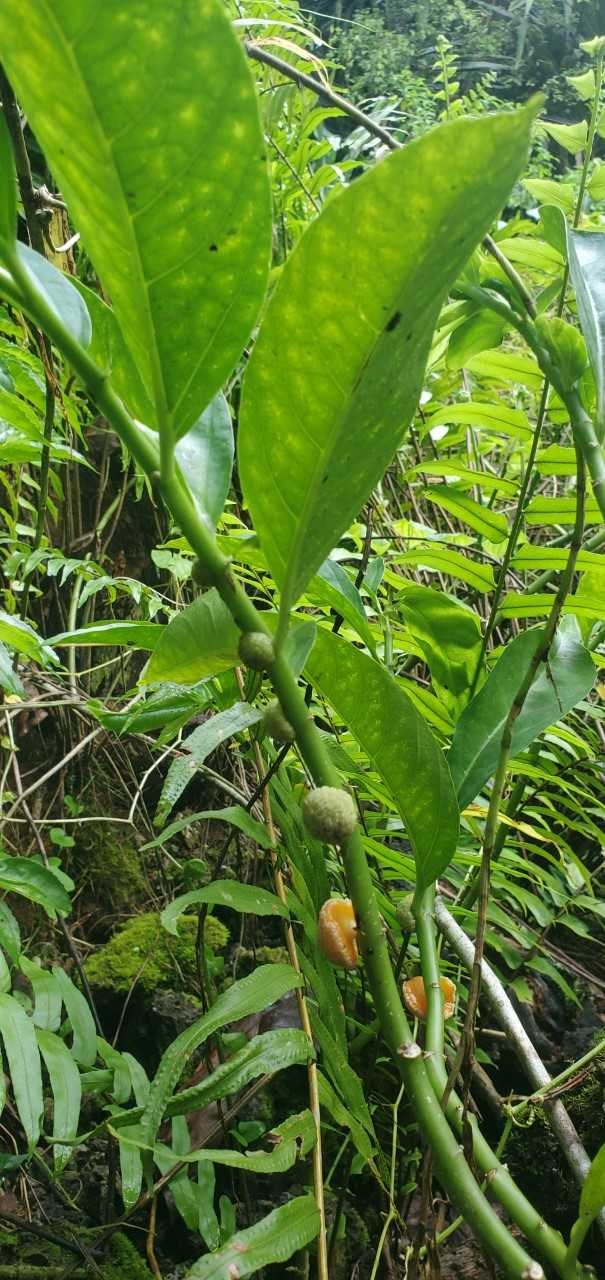
- Procris pedunculata immature and mature (orange) fruits. Dededo, Guam

Scientific classification
- Kingdom: Plantae
- Clade: Tracheophytes
- Clade: Angiosperms
- Clade: Eudicots
- Clade: Rosids
- Order: Rosales
- Family: Urticaceae
- Genus: Procris
- Species: P. pedunculata

Binomial name
- Procris pedunculata (J.R.Forst. & G.Forst.) Wedd.

Synonyms
- Elatostema pedunculatum J.R.Forst. & G.Forst.; Procris pedunculata var. eupedunculata H.Schroet.

= Procris pedunculata =

Species of plant

Procris pedunculata is a plant native to the Indian Ocean, Malesia and Pacific Ocean islands.

== Distribution ==
The plant is known to be native to the following regions:

- Indian Ocean (Christmas Islands, Mauritius, Réunion)
- Western Pacific Ocean (Philippines)
- Australia (Queensland)
- Malesia (Comoros, Jawa, Lesser Sunda Islands, Malaya)
- Micronesian Islands (Caroline Islands, Mariana Islands, Marshall Islands)
- Melanesia (Fiji, New Caledonia, New Guinea, Santa Cruz Islands, Solomon Islands, Vanuatu)
- Polynesia (Cook Islands, Marquesas, Niue, Pitcairn Islands, Samoa, Society Islands, Tokelau-Manihiki, Tonga, Tuamotu, Tubuai Islands, Wallis-Futuna Island)

== Ecology ==
In the Mariana Islands, Procris pedunculata and Elatostema species are two native plants that serve as host to the endangered Mariana eight spot butterfly (Hypolimnas octocula marianensis).
