= Forest B. H. Brown =

American botanist (1873–1954)

- Born: Forest Buffen Harkness Brown; 1873
- Died: 1954 (aged 80–81)
- Education: University of Michigan; Yale University (PhD)
- Occupation: Botanist
- Known for: Work with pteridophytes and seed plants
- Spouse: Elizabeth Dorothy Wuist (m. 1918)

Forest Buffen Harkness Brown (1873–1954) was an American botanist known for his work on pteridophytes and spermatophytes.

== Life and research ==
Brown studied forestry, systematic botany, and ecology at the University of Michigan in 1902, receiving his master's degree in 1903. Early in his career, Brown studied plant distribution on the flood plain of the Huron River in Ypsilanti, Michigan.

He worked for the United States Forest Service before joining Ohio State University as professor of botany. Brown pursued further research on Hawaiian trees at Yale University for two years and received his Ph.D. in 1918. He married biologist Elizabeth Dorothy Wuist on August 20 of the same year, and the two of them performed two years of field work on the Bernice P. Bishop Museum Bayard Dominick Expedition to the Marquesas Islands (1921–1922), along with ethnologist Edward S. Handy and archeologist Ralph Lauton. Brown and his wife also visited the Tuamotu archipelago and New Zealand where they collected 9000 dried plant and 120 wood samples. In 1920, Brown was a research fellow at Yale when he became a staff botanist for the Bishop Museum in Honolulu, Hawaii. His wife joined him at the Bishop Museum as a research associate in cryptogamic botany.

== Organizations ==
- Michigan Academy of Science

== Collections ==
- Ypsilanti Historical Society, YHS Letter Collection. Letters and drawings (1889–1918).

== Publications ==
- Brown, Forest B. H. (May 1914). "Starch Reserve in Relation to the Production of Sugar, Flowers, Leaves, and Seed in Birch and Maple". The Ohio Naturalist. 14 (7). Biological Club of the Ohio State University: 317–320.
- Brown, Forest Buffen Harknes (1922). "The Secondary Xylem of Hawaiian Trees". Occasional Papers of the Bernice Pauahi Bishop Museum of Polynesian Ethnology and Natural History. 8 (6). Honolulu, Hawaii: Bishop Museum Press.
- Brown, Flora of Southeastern Polynesia. Bishop Museum Press, Honolulu 1931-35. (3 volumes)
