= Slender myoporum =

Slender myoporum is a common name for several plants and may refer to:

- Myoporum floribundum
- Myoporum parvifolium
