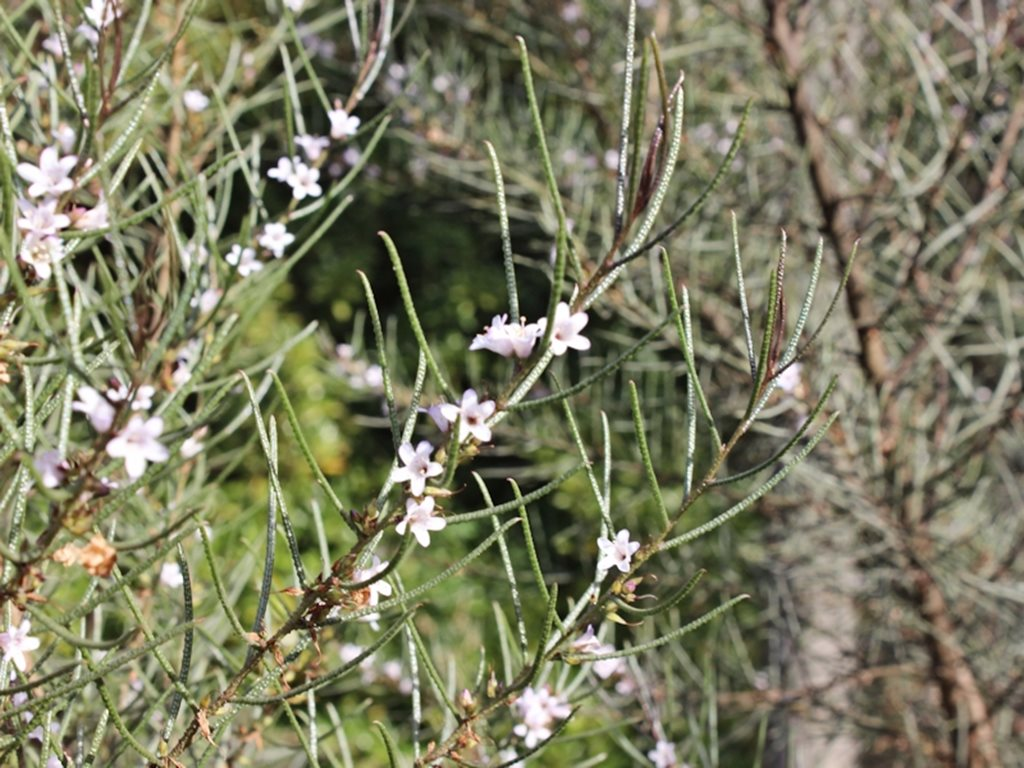
- Myoporum turbinatum in the ANBG

Conservation status
- Priority Four — Rare Taxa (DEC)

Scientific classification
- Kingdom: Plantae
- Clade: Tracheophytes
- Clade: Angiosperms
- Clade: Eudicots
- Clade: Asterids
- Order: Lamiales
- Family: Scrophulariaceae
- Genus: Myoporum
- Species: M. turbinatum

Binomial name
- Myoporum turbinatum Chinnock

= Myoporum turbinatum =

Salt myoporum

Species of flowering plant

Myoporum turbinatum, commonly known as salt myoporum, is a plant in the figwort family, Scrophulariaceae and is endemic to a small area near Esperance in Western Australia. It is closely related to Myoporum platycarpum but has much narrower leaves and differently shaped fruit. Its sticky branches and narrow, warty leaves are distinctive.

== Description ==
Myoporum turbinatum is an erect shrub which sometimes grows to a height of 4 metres (10 ft). Young plants have many stems but as they mature, more often have only a few warty, sticky, stems which are only leafy towards their ends. The leaves are arranged alternately and are linear in shape, usually 15–50 millimetres (0.6–2 in) long, 0.5–1.0 millimetre (0.02–0.04 in) wide, shiny, warty and sticky. There is a groove extending along both sides of the leaves and both sides of the leaves are the same, usually dark green colour.

The flowers are borne in leaf axils, usually in groups of 4 to 8 on stalks 1.5–4.5 millimetres (0.06–0.2 in) long. There are 5 egg-shaped sepals and 5 petals forming a bell-shaped tube. The petals are white or slightly pink, sometimes spotted inside the tube and on the base of the lobes. The tube is 3–4 millimetres (0.1–0.2 in) long, and the lobes are shorter than the length of the tube. Flowers are produced in most months, except during droughts. The fruits that follow are dry and shaped like a top, flattened with a point on the end and 3–4.5 by 1.5–2.5 millimetres (0.1 in–0.2 in × 0.06 in–0.1 in).

== Taxonomy and naming ==
Myoporum turbinatum was first formally described by taxonomist Bob Chinnock in Nuytsia in 1986 from a specimen collected in the north-east of Esperance. The specific epithet (turbinatum) is a Latin word meaning "shaped like a top", referring to the fruit.

== Distribution and habitat ==
Salt myoporum occurs in a small area north-east of Esperance in the Mallee biogeographic region, where it grows near salty areas in sandy soils, often in association with Melaleuca, Hakea and Eucalyptus species.

== Conservation ==
Myoporum turbinatum has been classified as "Priority 4" by the Government of Western Australia Department of Parks and Wildlife meaning that it is rare or near threatened.
