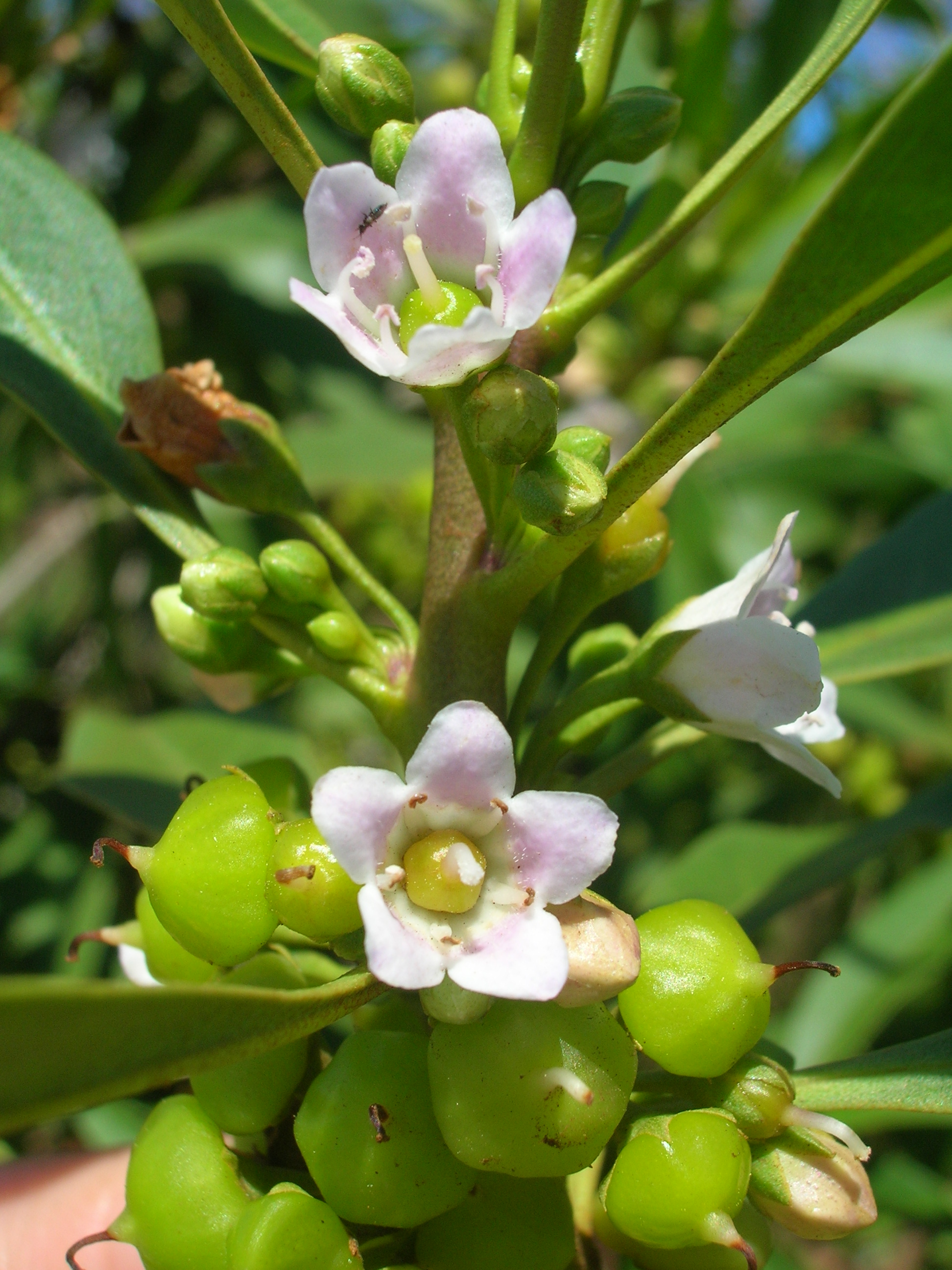

Scientific classification
- Kingdom: Plantae
- Clade: Tracheophytes
- Clade: Angiosperms
- Clade: Eudicots
- Clade: Asterids
- Order: Lamiales
- Family: Scrophulariaceae
- Genus: Myoporum
- Species: M. sandwicense

Binomial name
- Myoporum sandwicense (A.DC.) A.Gray

Synonyms
- Myoporum degeneri (G.L.Webster) O.Deg. & I.Deg.; Myoporum fauriei H.Lév.; Myoporum sandwicense var. degeneri G.L.Webster; Myoporum sandwicense subsp. lanaiense (G.L.Webster) Chinnock; Myoporum sandwicense var. lanaiense G.L.Webster; Myoporum sandwicense subsp. st-johnii G.L.Webster; Myoporum st-johnii (G.L.Webster) O.Deg. & Greenwell; Polycoelium sandwicense A.DC.

= Myoporum sandwicense =

Species of tree

Myoporum sandwicense, commonly known as naio, bastard sandalwood or false sandalwood is a species of flowering plant in the figwort family, Scrophulariaceae. It is a tree or shrub highly variable in its form, the size and shape of its leaves, in the number of flowers in a group and in the shape of its fruit. It is native to the Hawaiian Islands and the island of ʻEua in Tonga.

== Description ==
Myoporum sandwicense grows as either a small tree, large tree, or dwarf shrub, depending on the elevation and conditions. As a small tree, it reaches a height of 9 metres (30 ft) with a trunk diameter of 0.3 metres (0.98 ft). The largest naio have a height of 18 metres (59 ft) and a trunk diameter of 0.9 metres (3.0 ft). At the tree line, naio grows as a 0.6-metre (2.0 ft) shrub. The bark on older specimens is often dark, rough and furrowed. The leaves are arranged alternately, often crowded near the ends of the stems, mostly 60–135 millimetres (2–5 in) long, 11–25 millimetres (0.4–1 in) wide, elliptic to lance-shaped and with a distinct mid-vein on the lower surface.

Flowers are present all year and are arranged in groups of 2 to 6 in leaf axils on stalks 4.5–18 millimetres (0.2–0.7 in) long. They are a tubular bell shape with a fragrant odor and there are 5 lance-shaped sepals and 5 petals forming the tube. The tube is generally white or pink with darker blotches at the base of the lobes and the tube is usually 1.5–3.5 millimetres (0.06–0.1 in) long with lobes about the same length. The fruit is a waxy white drupe that is 8 millimetres (0.31 in) in diameter, juicy, and bitter to taste. The fruit usually dry out and remain attached to the branch.

== Taxonomy ==
The species was first formally described as Polycoelium sandwicense by Alphonse Pyramus de Candolle in 1847. In 1862 Asa Gray renamed the species Myoporum sandwicense in Proceedings of the American Academy of Arts and Sciences. The specific epithet sandwicense refers to the Sandwich Islands, the name given by James Cook to the Hawaiian Islands, where the type specimen was collected.

There are two subspecies:

- Myoporum sandwicense A.Gray subsp. sandwicense which occurs on all the Hawaiian Islands and has fruit which is oval to almost spherical;
- Myoporum sandwicense subsp. lanaiensis (G.L.Webster) Chinnock which is only found on Lanai and has fruit which is cone-shaped to lens-shaped.

In 1951 Grady Webster included a form found in the Cook Islands as Myoporum sandwicense subsp. wilderi but it is now known as Myoporum wilderi Skottsb.

Some sources describe varieties including degeneri Webster, fauriei (Levl.) Kraenzlin, st.-johnii Webster, and stellatum Webster. In addition, a prostrate, shrubby variety known as naio papa ("flat naio") grows only at South Point on the island of Hawaiʻi and is characterized by its similarities to creeping shrubs.

== Distribution and habitat ==
The distribution of M. sandwicense in the United States is limited to the state of Hawaiʻi. Within the state, it is found on all of the major islands at elevations from sea level to 2,380 metres (7,810 ft). Naio can be found in a variety of habitats, including low shrublands, dry forests, mesic forests, and wet forests, but is most common in subalpine shrublands.

== Uses ==
=== Indigenous uses ===
The finely-textured wood of M. sandwicense is hard and has a specific gravity of 0.55. Native Hawaiians, who called the wood ʻaʻaka, used it to make manu (bow and stern ornamental end pieces) and pale (gunwales) for waʻa (outrigger canoes), pou (house posts), haha ka ʻupena (fishing net spacers), and lamalama (long-burning torches for night fishing). The oily wood was also used as a substitute for ʻiliahi (Santalum spp.) due to the similarity in smell when burned.

=== Horticulture ===
M. sandwicense can be cultivated using seeds separated from the fruit - the average germination time varies by reports but is most commonly noted as taking between six and eighteen months. Propagation by cuttings and air layering is also possible.

=== Other uses ===
For a short time in the 19th century after most ʻIliahi (Santalum freycinetianum) had been harvested, naio was exported to China, where it was made into incense and burned in Joss houses.
