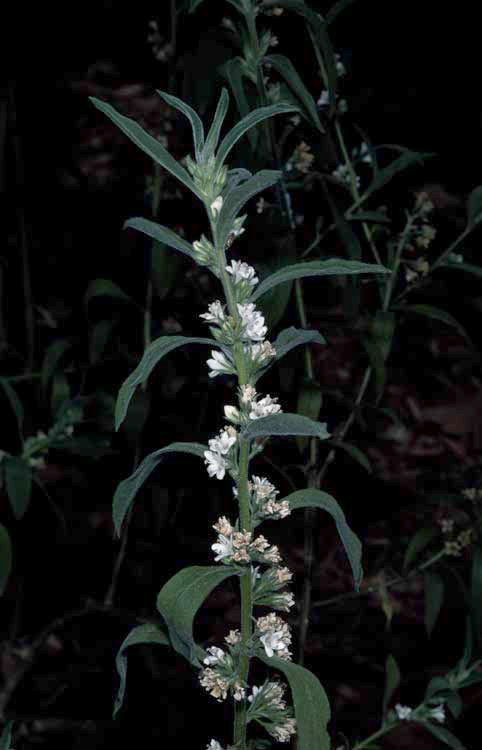

Conservation status
- Declared rare (DEC)

Scientific classification
- Kingdom: Plantae
- Clade: Tracheophytes
- Clade: Angiosperms
- Clade: Eudicots
- Clade: Asterids
- Order: Lamiales
- Family: Scrophulariaceae
- Genus: Myoporum
- Species: M. velutinum

Binomial name
- Myoporum velutinum Chinnock

Synonyms
- Myoporum serratum var. pubescens Benth.; Myoporum tetrandrum var. pubescens (Benth.) Domin

= Myoporum velutinum =

Species of flowering plant

Myoporum velutinum is a plant in the figwort family, Scrophulariaceae and is endemic to a small area near Esperance in Western Australia. It has similar flowers and fruits and grows in similar environments to Myoporum tetrandrum but differs from it and all other members of the genus by having hairs on the outer edge of the petals.

== Description ==
Myoporum velutinum is a shrub which sometimes grows to a height of 4 metres (10 ft) and which has hairs on the stem and leaves but lacks the warty surface of many other myoporums. The leaves are arranged alternately and are lance shaped, usually 50–72 millimetres (2–3 in) long, 7–16 millimetres (0.3–0.6 in) wide, soft, covered with soft hairs, darker green on the upper surface and have a prominent mid-vein.

The flowers are borne in leaf axils, usually in groups of 1 to 5 on stalks 4–9 millimetres (0.2–0.4 in) long. There are 5 triangular, pointed sepals and 5 petals forming a bell-shaped tube. The petals are white or pale lilac, sometimes spotted inside the tube and on the base of the lobes. The tube is 2.5–4 millimetres (0.1–0.2 in) long and the lobes are about the same length. The tube is hairy on its inner and outer surfaces and there are 4 stamens which extend slightly beyond the petal tube. The fruit that follows flowering is an oval-shaped drupe, about 3–3.5 by 3–4.5 millimetres (0.1 in–0.1 in × 0.1 in–0.2 in).

== Taxonomy and naming ==
Myoporum velutinum was first formally described by taxonomist Bob Chinnock in Eremophila and allied genera: a monograph of the plant family Myoporaceae in 2007 from a specimen collected near Condingup. The specific epithet (velutinum) is a Latin word meaning "velvety", referring to the indumentum of the leaves".

== Distribution and habitat ==
Myoporum velutinum occurs in a small area near Cape Le Grand where it grows along creeks in Melaleuca woodland.

== Conservation ==
Myoporum velutinum has been classified as " Threatened Flora (Declared Rare Flora — Extant)" by the Government of Western Australia Department of Parks and Wildlife meaning that it is "likely to become extinct or is rare, or otherwise in need of special protection".
