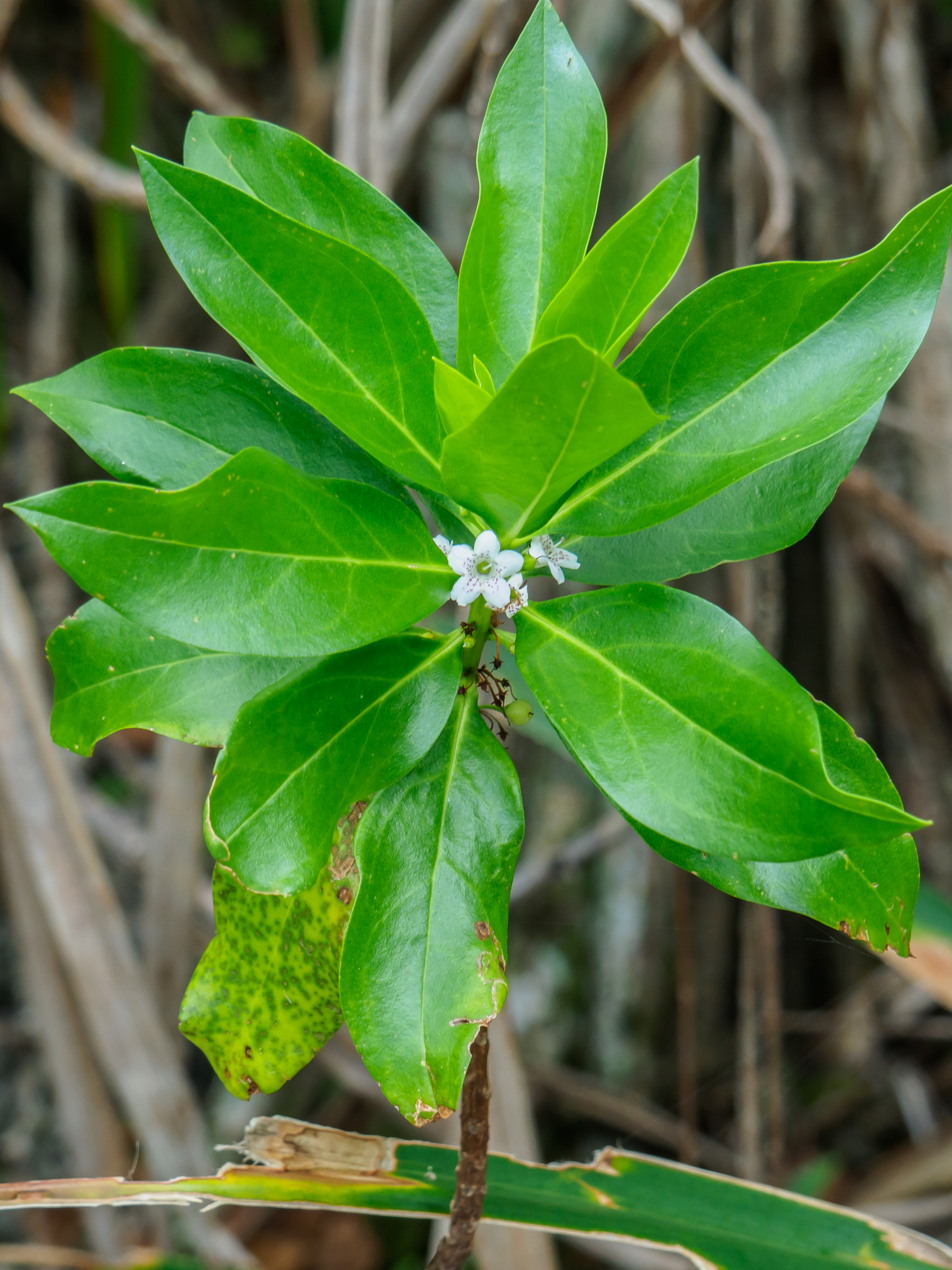
- Myoporum wilderi on Mangaia in the Cook Islands

Scientific classification
- Kingdom: Plantae
- Clade: Embryophytes
- Clade: Tracheophytes
- Clade: Angiosperms
- Clade: Eudicots
- Clade: Asterids
- Order: Lamiales
- Family: Scrophulariaceae
- Genus: Myoporum
- Species: M. wilderi

Binomial name
- Myoporum wilderi Skottsb.

= Myoporum wilderi =

Cook Islands myoporum

Species of flowering plant

Myoporum wilderi, commonly known as Cook Islands myoporum or ngaio, is a plant in the figwort family, Scrophulariaceae and is endemic to the islands of Mangaia and Mitiaro in the Cook Islands. It is similar to Myoporum stokesii and Myoporum rimatarense which grow on other Pacific Islands. On the island of Rarotonga it is used to add a scent to coconut oil.

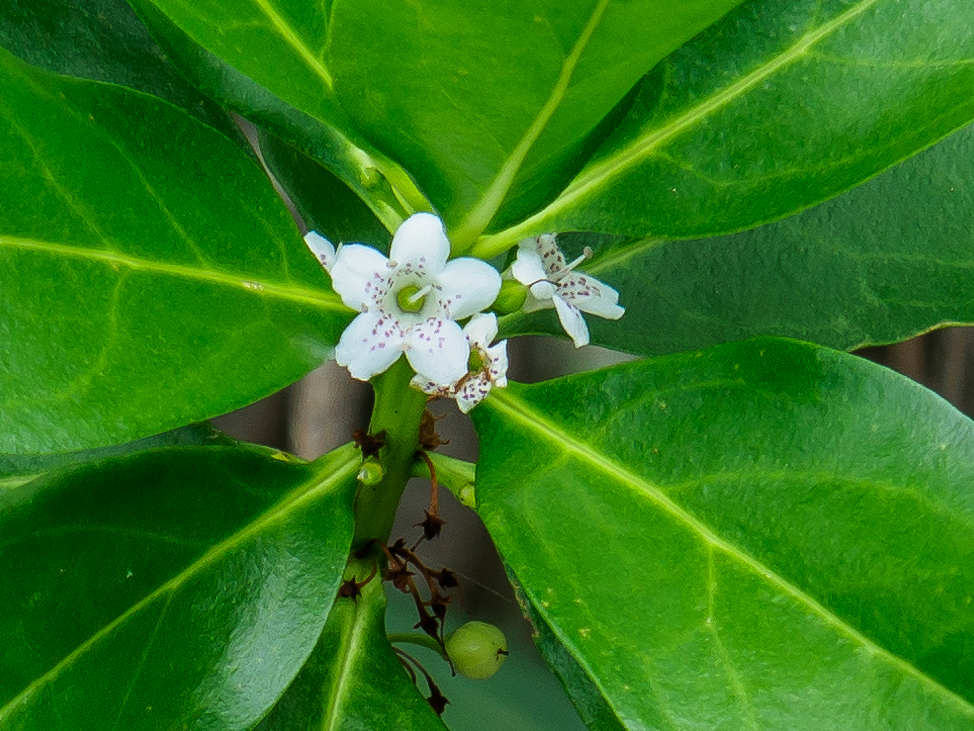
Myoporum wilderi flower detail

== Description ==
Myoporum wilderi is a shrub or small tree sometimes growing to a height of 5 metres (20 ft) with young branches that are flattened or three-sided. The leaves are arranged alternately, are broadly elliptical in shape with a pointed tip and are mostly 50–102 millimetres (2–4 in) long and 15–35 millimetres (0.6–1 in) wide. They are the same shiny colour on both surfaces, glabrous and have a distinct mid-vein.

The flowers are borne in groups of up to 6 in the axils of leaves on stalks 6–12 millimetres (0.2–0.5 in) long and usually have 5 pointed sepals and 5 petals forming a tube or bell-shape. The tube is 4–5 millimetres (0.16–0.20 in) long with lobes about the same length. The tube is white with distinct purple spots in the tube and on the inner parts of the lobes. There are four stamens which extend beyond the petal tube. The fruits is an oval shaped drupe with a distinct point on the end.

== Taxonomy ==
Myoporum wilderi was first formally described in 1933 by Carl Skottsberg and the description was published in Acta Horti Gothoburgensis. The specific epithet wilderi honours the botanist Gerrit Parmile Wilder.

== Distribution and habitat ==
Myoporum wilderi is only found on Mangaia and Mitiaro.

== Uses ==
On Mangaia, the flowers of this myoporum are used to scent coconut oil. On Rarotonga, the species is cultivated for the same purpose.
