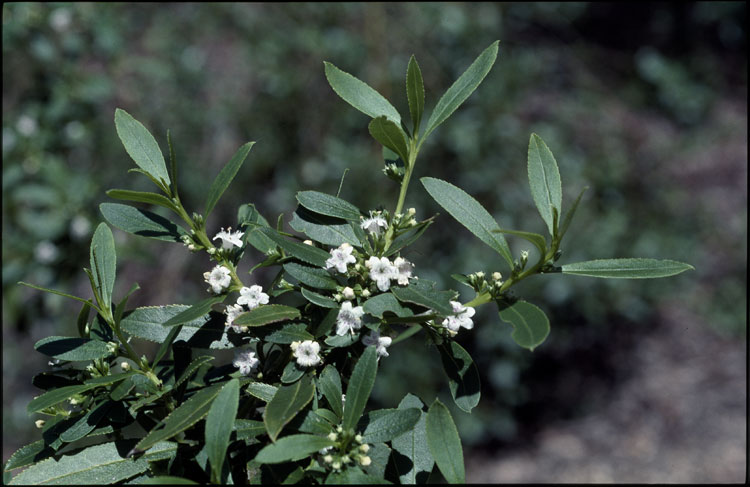

Scientific classification
- Kingdom: Plantae
- Clade: Tracheophytes
- Clade: Angiosperms
- Clade: Eudicots
- Clade: Asterids
- Order: Lamiales
- Family: Scrophulariaceae
- Genus: Myoporum
- Species: M. caprarioides

Binomial name
- Myoporum caprarioides Benth.

= Myoporum caprarioides =

Slender myoporum

Species of shrub

Myoporum caprarioides, commonly known as slender myoporum, is a plant in the figwort family, Scrophulariaceae. It is a shrub with wart-like tubercles covering its branches and leaves, especially on the upper surface and white flowers spotted with mauve, or all blue-mauve, present for most of the warmer months.

== Description ==
Myoporum caprarioides is an erect shrub which grows to a height of 2 metres (7 ft) and has wart-like tubercles covering its branches and leaves. The leaves are arranged alternately and are flat, not succulent, 17–70 millimetres (0.7–3 in) long and 3.5–13 millimetres (0.1–0.5 in) wide. They are elliptic in shape with minute serrations on the edges. The upper surface is shinier and darker than the lower surface which has a raised midrib.

The flowers appear singly or in small groups in the axils of the leaves and have 5 sepals and 5 white spotted pink or entirely pink petals joined at their base to form a tube. The tube is 2.4–3.1 millimetres (0.09–0.1 in) long and the lobes are spreading and 2.4–4 millimetres (0.09–0.2 in) long. There are 4 stamens which extend beyond the petals. Flowering occurs throughout the whole year, apart from the coldest months and is followed by brown fruits which are drupes, 2–3 millimetres (0.08–0.1 in) in diameter and roughly spherical in shape.

== Taxonomy and naming ==
Myoporum caprarioides was first formally described in 1837 by George Bentham in Stephan Endlicher's Enumeratio plantarum quas in Novae Hollandiæ ora austro-occidentali ad fluvium Cygnorum et in sinu Regis Georgii collegit Carolus Liber Baro de Hügel. The specific epithet refers to a similarity to the genus Capraria.

== Distribution and habitat ==
Myoporum caprarioides occurs along the coast of Western Australia from Dongara to Busselton, often in tuart (Eucalyptus gomphocephala) forest but also along watercourses and in winter-wet areas.

== Conservation ==
Myoporum caprarioides is classified as "not threatened" by the Western Australian Government Department of Parks and Wildlife.
