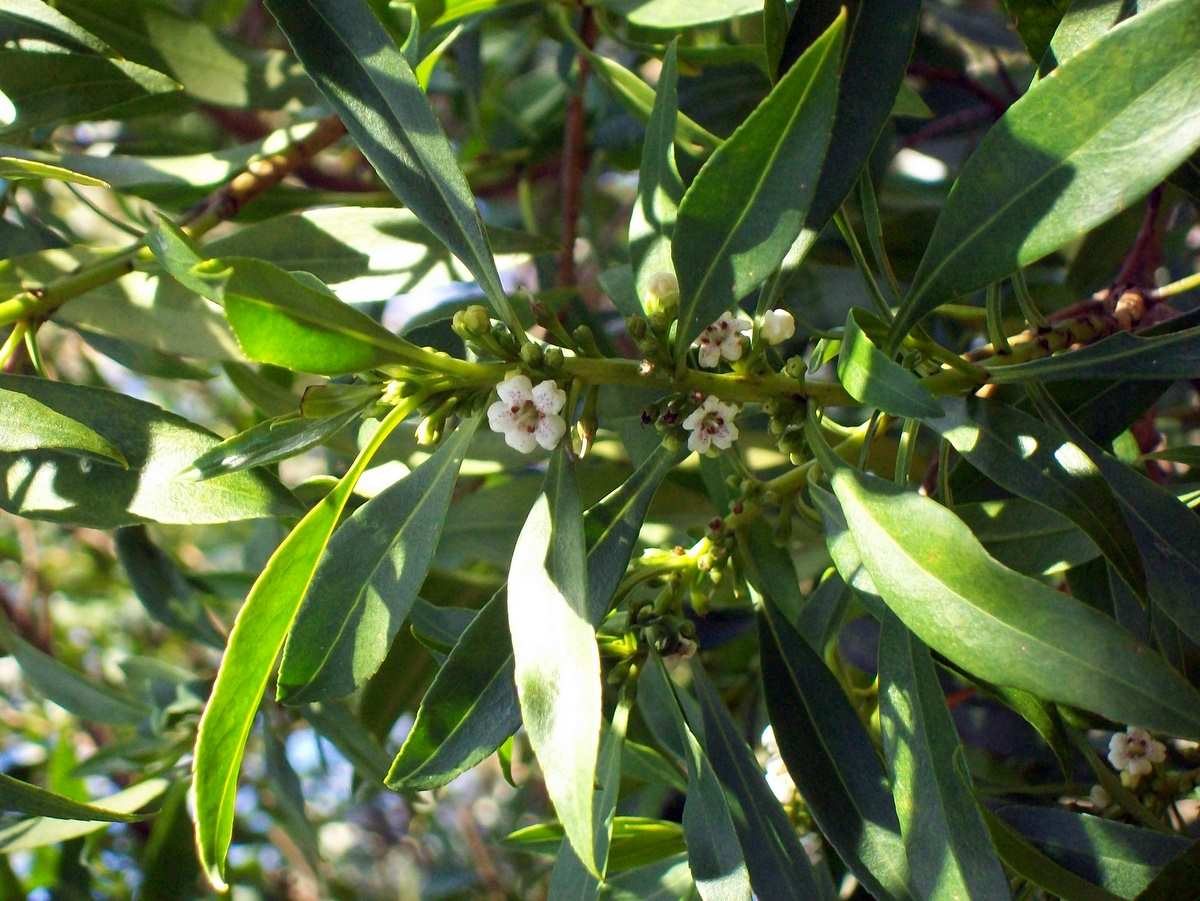
- Myoporum acuminatum in the Batemans Bay botanic garden

Scientific classification
- Kingdom: Plantae
- Clade: Tracheophytes
- Clade: Angiosperms
- Clade: Eudicots
- Clade: Asterids
- Order: Lamiales
- Family: Scrophulariaceae
- Genus: Myoporum
- Species: M. acuminatum

Binomial name
- Myoporum acuminatum R.Br.

= Myoporum acuminatum =

Species of tree

Myoporum acuminatum, commonly known as waterbush, pointed boobialla or mangrove boobialla, is a flowering plant in the figwort family Scrophulariaceae and is endemic to eastern Australia. It grows in rainforest or wet eucalyptus forest near the coast and in the Coastal Ranges, and is occasionally associated with mangroves. Occasionally it is found in the drier rainforests. It grows naturally as far south as Mimosa Rocks National Park in far south eastern New South Wales, and north to Fraser Island in Southern Queensland.

== Description ==
Myoporum acuminatum grows as a hairless shrub or small tree, up to 13 metres (40 ft) tall and a trunk diameter of 50 cm (20 in). In larger plants the trunk may be irregular in shape with flanges. Bark is greyish brown and somewhat wrinkled in larger trees. Small branches are green and fairly thick, though smooth.

M. acuminatum has been considered by some authors to encompass Myoporum montanum. The two species are closely and related and M. montanum has an overlapping range. The common name Waterbush is originally derived from M. montanum, which grows throughout arid central Australia as well as coastal regions, and whose presence is thought to be indicative of groundwater.

The species are difficult to distinguish, being closely related with an overlapping range. M. montanum has smaller, narrower leaves, the flower sepals of M. montanum lack the translucent margins of M. acuminatum and the fruit of M. montanum is pink or light purple compared with the dark purple or blue fruit of M. acuminatum.

=== Leaves ===
Leaves are 5 to 14 cm long and 7 to 28 mm wide with a fine point, though rarely seen with a rounded end. The base of the leaf becomes thin near the leaf stem, which measures 6 to 20 mm long. Leaf edges may be finely toothed, or smooth. Leaves lack stipules. Oil dots of varying sizes may be seen under a magnifying lens, of a distance apart of 3 to 5 diameters. Only the midrib is easily seen, other lateral or net veins are obscure.

=== Flowers and fruit ===
Flowers appear from May to August, though later in the southern parts of its range. Flowers feature five white petals, with four rows of purple spots and a sweet scent. They grow in clusters from the leaf axils.

The fruit is a roughened, wrinkled drupe. Globular in shape, 5 mm in diameter, dark blue or dark purple in colour. Remnants of the flower style point out of the fruit, 3 to 4 mm long and hooked. Inside are two to four seeds, maturing from October to February.

== Taxonomy ==
The plant first appeared in scientific literature in Prodromus Florae Novae Hollandiae in 1810, authored by Robert Brown. The genus name Myoporum refers to the Ancient Greek roots myein meaning "to shut" or "to close" and πόρος (poros) meaning "opening" or "pore" referring to the closed glands which appear as transparent spots on the leaves, flowers and fruits. The specific epithet (acuminatum) is a Latin word meaning "tapering to a prolonged point".

== Distribution and habitat ==
Myoporum acuminatum grows in rainforest or eucalyptus forest of eastern Australia, from Queensland to the far south coast of New South Wales.

== Use in horticulture ==
Waterbush is a hardy plant in cultivation and can tolerate salt spray. It prefers well drained soil in full sun and is most easily propagated from cuttings.
