= Myoporum niueanum =

Scientific classification
- Kingdom: Plantae
- Clade: Tracheophytes
- Clade: Angiosperms
- Clade: Eudicots
- Clade: Asterids
- Order: Lamiales
- Family: Scrophulariaceae
- Genus: Myoporum
- Species: M. niueanum

Binomial name
- Myoporum niueanum H.St.John

Species of flowering plant

Myoporum niueanum, alternatively known as the Niue myoporum, is a plant in the figwort family, Scrophulariaceae of unresolved status that was first described by botanist Harold St. John in 1976 based upon plant material originally collected a century earlier. It is believed to be endemic to the Polynesian island nation of Niue. The species is recognized by several authorities as a full species, however there have been no modern observations and it is unclear if the species may actually have come from a different locality or gone extinct since the original collection. The respected botanist Arthur Whistler formally challenged the terms of the original species description and suggested the type specimen may indeed have been undescribed but actually have come from a different region.

== Description ==
St. John describes the species as a glabrous woody plant with leafy branchlets 1–3 mm in diameter, possessing a longitudinal ridge. The leaves are alternate with petioles 6–8 mm long. The leaf blades are described as 5.5–6.7 cm long, 1.3–1.7 cm wide, narrowly elliptic, but cuneate and decurrent at the base. The flowers are broadly ovate and acute occurring 1–2 to an axil with pedicels 7–9 mm long, calyx 2.5 mm long, and 5 lobes 0.8 mm long.
