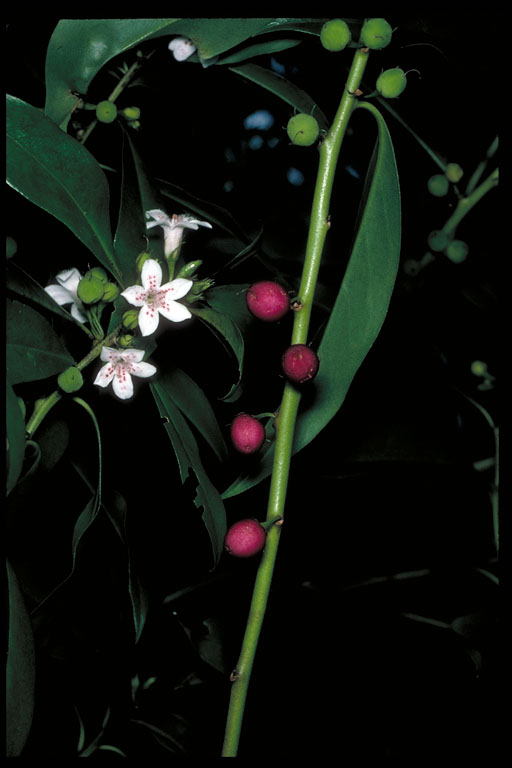

Conservation status
- Critically endangered (EPBC Act)

Scientific classification
- Kingdom: Plantae
- Clade: Tracheophytes
- Clade: Angiosperms
- Clade: Eudicots
- Clade: Asterids
- Order: Lamiales
- Family: Scrophulariaceae
- Genus: Myoporum
- Species: M. obscurum

Binomial name
- Myoporum obscurum Endl.

= Myoporum obscurum =

Popwood

Species of flowering plant

Myoporum obscurum, commonly known as popwood, sandalwood or bastard ironwood is a plant in the figwort family, Scrophulariaceae. It is a very rare shrub, endemic to Norfolk Island where it occurs in a few scattered locations.

== Description ==
Myoporum obscurum is a spreading shrub or small dome-shaped tree which sometimes grows to a height of 6 metres (20 ft). The leaves are arranged alternately and are thin, elliptic to lance-shaped, 69–135 millimetres (3–5 in) long, 25–40 millimetres (1–2 in) wide, have a shiny upper surface and a dull lower one with a distinct mid-vein. The edges of the leaf are wavy and occasionally have a few small teeth near the end.

The flowers appear in groups of 3 to 6 in the axils of the leaves on the end of flattened stalks 6.5–11 millimetres (0.3–0.4 in) long. They have 5 lance-shaped sepals and 5 petals joined at their bases to form a tube. The tube is 4–6 millimetres (0.16–0.24 in) long and the lobes are about the same length as the tube. The tube is white, spotted purple on the lobes and inside the tube and the inside of the tube is hairy. There are 4 stamens which extend slightly beyond the petal tube. The fruit is an oval-shaped, reddish drupe.

== Taxonomy and naming ==
Myoporum obscurum was first formally described in 1833 by Stephan Endlicher and the description was published in Prodromus Florae Norfolkicae. The type specimen was found on Norfolk Island by Ferdinand Bauer. The specific epithet is derived from the "Latin obscurum, indistinct, dark".

== Distribution and habitat ==
Only a few specimens of Myoporum obscurum remain and only in a few scattered locations on Norfolk Island. The species was common on nearby Phillip Island in 1830, but along with most of the rest of the vegetation there, was lost in the 19th century due to erosion caused by the introduction of pest animals such as rabbits. In 2003 only 5 plants were known on Norfolk Island, all in the national park. Since then, a management plan for the species has been prepared and a number of specimens of popwood have been planted. It does not tolerate shade and is generally found on forest margins.

== Ecology ==
Little is known of the ecology of popwood, other than it is threatened by competition from weed species.

== Conservation ==
Myoporum obscurum is listed as "critically endangered" in terms of the Australian Government Environment Protection and Biodiversity Act.
