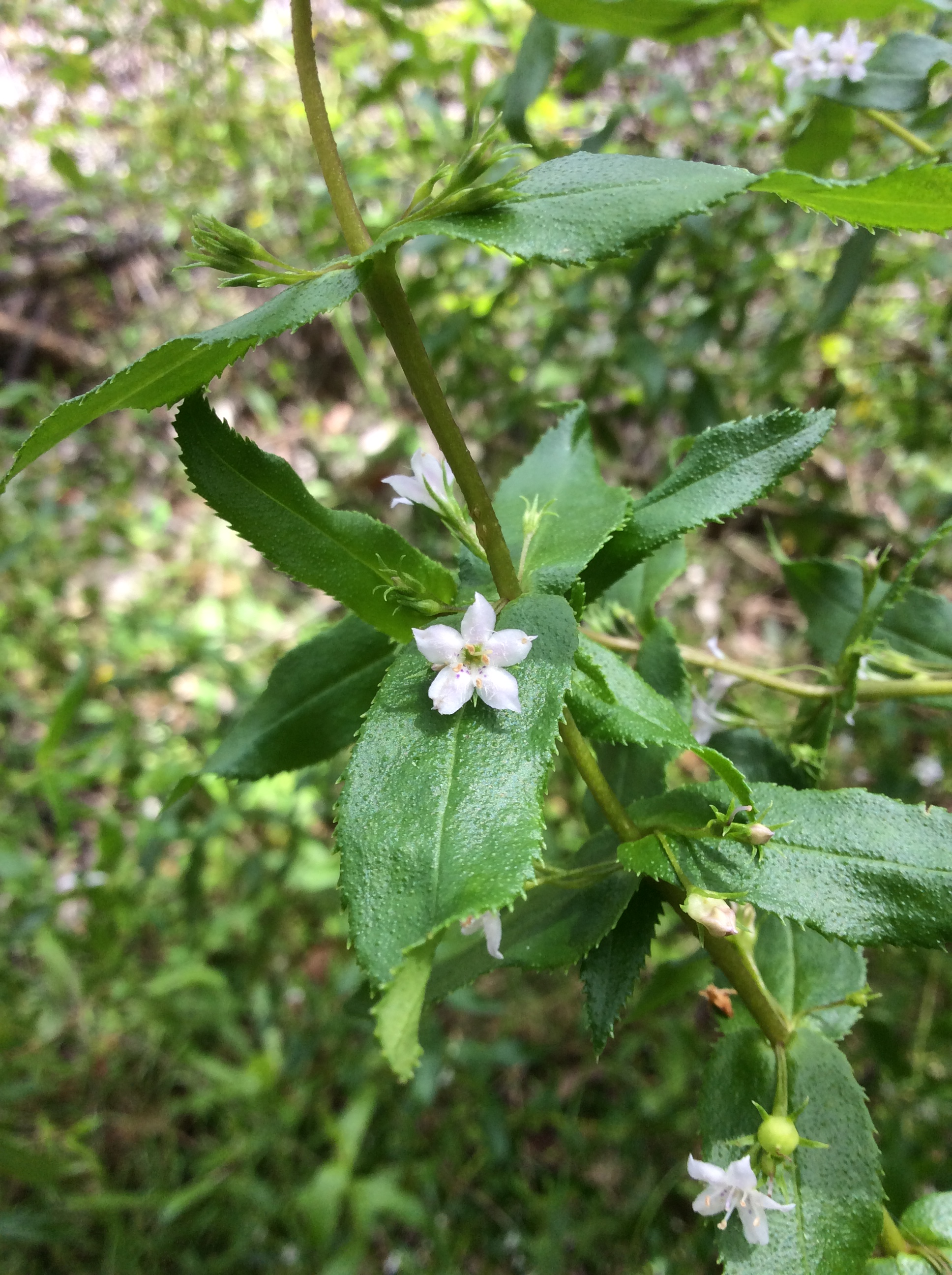
- Myoporum oppositifolium at Beedelup Falls in Beedelup National Park

Scientific classification
- Kingdom: Plantae
- Clade: Tracheophytes
- Clade: Angiosperms
- Clade: Eudicots
- Clade: Asterids
- Order: Lamiales
- Family: Scrophulariaceae
- Genus: Myoporum
- Species: M. oppositifolium

Binomial name
- Myoporum oppositifolium R.Br.

= Myoporum oppositifolium =

Twin-leaf myoporum

Species of flowering plant

Myoporum oppositifolium, commonly known as twin-leaf myoporum, is a plant in the figwort family, Scrophulariaceae. It is easily distinguished from others in the genus by the combination of glabrous leaves and branches, its opposite leaf arrangement and its serrated leaves. Its distribution is restricted to the extreme south-west of Western Australia.

== Description ==
Myoporum oppositifolium is an erect shrub which grows to a height of 1–2 metres (3–7 ft) and has glabrous branches which usually have raised, wart-like tubercles. The leaves are also tuberculate, especially on the lower surface and are arranged in opposite pairs. The leaves are egg-shaped to narrow lance-shaped, 20–50 millimetres (0.8–2 in) long, 8–16 millimetres (0.3–0.6 in) wide and the leaf margins are serrated for their entire length.

The flowers appear in groups of one to four in the axils of the leaves on a stalk 6–11 millimetres (0.2–0.4 in) long. The flowers have 5 green or purplish sepals and 5 petals joined at their bases to form a tube. The tube is white, spotted purple on the bases of the lobes and on the top part of the tube, 2–3.2 millimetres (0.08–0.1 in) long, the lobes spreading and 2.5–4 millimetres (0.1–0.2 in) long. There are 4 stamens which extend slightly beyond the petals. Flowering occurs throughout the whole year and is followed by lilac to brown fruits which are drupes, 2.5–5 millimetres (0.1–0.2 in) in diameter and roughly spherical in shape.

== Taxonomy and naming ==
Myoporum oppositifolium was first formally described in 1810 by Robert Brown and the description was published in Prodromus Florae Novae Hollandiae. The specific epithet (oppositifolium) is derived from the Latin words oppositus, meaning "standing opposite" and folium, meaning "leaf".

== Distribution and habitat ==
Twin-leaf myoporum occurs along the coast of Western Australia from near Busselton to near Albany in the Esperance Plains, Jarrah Forest and Warren biogeographic regions. It grows in sand or loamy soil, often near karri, along watercourses and sometimes on coastal cliffs.

== Conservation ==
Myoporum oppositifolium is classified as "not threatened" by the Western Australian Government Department of Parks and Wildlife.
