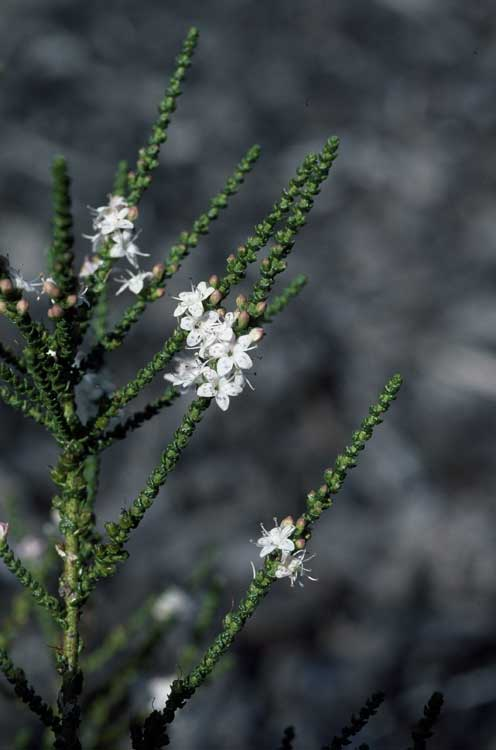

Conservation status
- Vulnerable (EPBC Act)

Scientific classification
- Kingdom: Plantae
- Clade: Tracheophytes
- Clade: Angiosperms
- Clade: Eudicots
- Clade: Asterids
- Order: Lamiales
- Family: Scrophulariaceae
- Genus: Myoporum
- Species: M. cordifolium

Binomial name
- Myoporum cordifolium (F.Muell.) Druce

= Myoporum cordifolium =

Jerramungup myoporum

Species of shrub

Myoporum cordifolium, commonly known as Jerramungup myoporum, is a plant in the figwort family, Scrophulariaceae. It is a shrub with thin, stiff branches and tiny, heart-shaped leaves, both covered with wart-like tubercles. Single white flowers with purple spots develop in the leaf axils and are followed by wrinkled green or brown fruits. It is endemic to a small area in the south-west of Western Australia

== Description ==
Myoporum cordifolium is an erect shrub which grows to a height of 1–1.5 metres (3–5 ft). It has wart-like tubercles covering its thin, stiff, twiggy branches and tiny, crowded, heart-shaped leaves. The leaves are fleshy, 1.3–3.8 millimetres (0.05–0.1 in) long and 1.2–3.7 millimetres (0.05–0.1 in) wide.

The flowers are solitary in the axils of the leaves and have 5 sepals and 5 white, spotted pink petals joined at their base to form a tube. The tube is 2.0–3.5 millimetres (0.08–0.1 in) long and the lobes are spreading and 2.1–3.6 millimetres (0.08–0.1 in) long. There are 4 stamens which extend beyond the petals. Flowering occurs from June to November and is followed by wrinkled green or brown fruits which are drupes, 1–2.5 millimetres (0.04–0.1 in) long and slightly flattened.

== Taxonomy and naming ==
Myoporum cordifolium was first formally described in 1859 by Ferdinand von Mueller in Fragmenta phytographiae Australiae and given the name Disoon cordifolius. In 1917, George Claridge Druce transferred it to the present genus. The specific epithet (cordifolium) is derived from the Latin words cor, genitive cordis, "heart" and folium, "leaf", meaning "with heart-shaped leaves".

== Distribution and habitat ==
Myoporum cordifolium occurs between the Ongerup and Jerramungup districts in the Esperance Plains, Jarrah Forest and Mallee biogeographic regions, where it grows in sandy or clay loam.

== Conservation ==
Myoporum cordifolium is classified as "Threatened" by the Western Australian Government Department of Parks and Wildlife meaning that it is likely to become extinct or rare and therefore in need of special protection. It has also been declared "vulnerable" by the Australian Government Department of the Environment.
