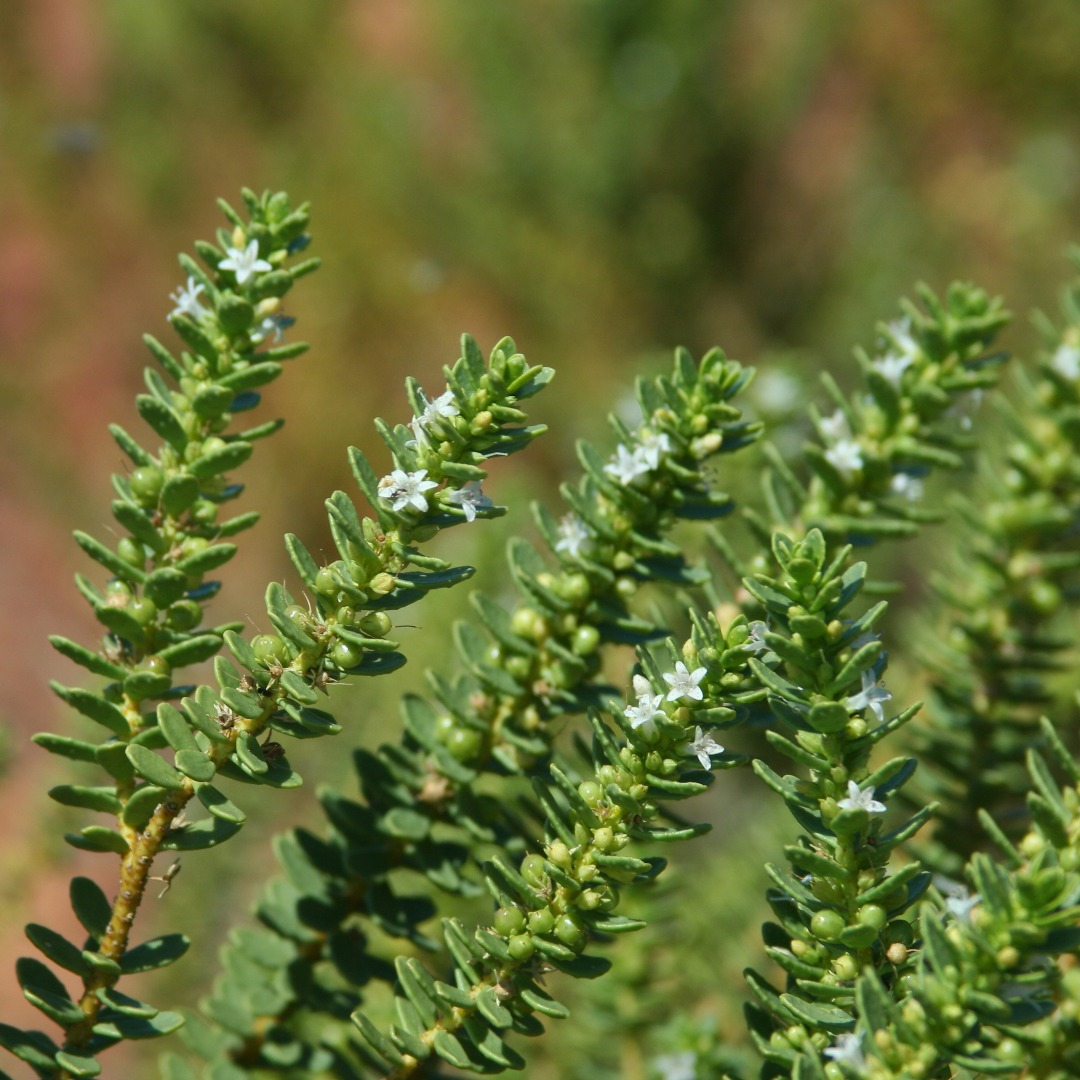
- Myoporum brevipes growing in South Australia

Scientific classification
- Kingdom: Plantae
- Clade: Tracheophytes
- Clade: Angiosperms
- Clade: Eudicots
- Clade: Asterids
- Order: Lamiales
- Family: Scrophulariaceae
- Genus: Myoporum
- Species: M. brevipes

Binomial name
- Myoporum brevipes Benth.

= Myoporum brevipes =

Pale myoporum

Species of plant

Myoporum brevipes, commonly known as the pale myoporum, is a plant in the figwort family, Scrophulariaceae. It is sometimes a prostrate, others an erect shrub. Its branches and leaves are warty and it has white or pink flowers, often spotted, followed by succulent white fruits. It generally grows in arid areas in South Australia but has also been found in Victoria and Western Australia.

== Description ==
Myoporum brevipes is a shrub, sometimes prostrate, others erect and spreading. It grows to a height of 2 metres (7 ft) high and has wart-like tubercles covering its branches and leaves. The leaves are arranged alternately and are thick, often fleshy, 2.5–28 millimetres (0.1–1 in) long, 1.2–8 millimetres (0.05–0.3 in) wide. They are variable in shape but often egg-shaped with the narrower end towards the base.

The flowers are arranged in groups of 1 to 5 in the axils of the leaves and have 5 sepals and 5 white or pink petals joined at their base to form a tube and often spotted with pink or purple. The tube is 1.5–5.5 millimetres (0.06–0.2 in) long and the lobes are 1.5–3.5 millimetres (0.06–0.1 in) long and warty. There are 4 stamens which extend beyond the petals. Flowering occurs between October and February and is followed by white fruits which are drupes, 2.5–6.5 millimetres (0.1–0.3 in) in diameter and oval or roughly spherical in shape.

== Taxonomy and naming ==
Myoporum brevipes was first formally described in 1870 by George Bentham in Flora Australiensis from a specimen collected on an expedition of John McDouall Stuart. The specific epithet (brevipes) is derived from the Latin words brevis meaning "short" and pes meaning "foot","probably referring to the short pedicels (flower stalks) in the material available to Bentham."

== Distribution and habitat ==
Myoporum brevipes occurs mainly in South Australia, although there are small populations in Western Australia. It is very rare in Victoria with only a few individual plants near Boinka. It grows in sandy soils containing calcium carbonate on sand dunes or near saline lakes and often in disturbed situations such as roadsides.

== Conservation ==
Myoporum brevipes is classified as not threatened in Western Australia or South Australia but is classified as endangered in Victoria.
