= Myoporum stokesii =

Conservation status
- Critically Endangered (IUCN 3.1)

Scientific classification
- Kingdom: Plantae
- Clade: Tracheophytes
- Clade: Angiosperms
- Clade: Eudicots
- Clade: Asterids
- Order: Lamiales
- Family: Scrophulariaceae
- Genus: Myoporum
- Species: M. stokesii

Binomial name
- Myoporum stokesii F.Br.

Species of flowering plant

Myoporum stokesii is a plant in the figwort family, Scrophulariaceae and is endemic to the island of Raivavae in French Polynesia. It is similar to the two other members of its genus on the island, Myoporum rapense and Myoporum rimatarense although the former has serrated leaves and the latter has wider leaves and differently shaped fruits.

== Description ==
Myoporum stokesii is a shrub or small tree sometimes growing to a height of 5 metres (20 ft) with young branches that are flattened or three-sided. The older branches are wrinkled and have raised leaf bases. The leaves are arranged alternately and are mostly 45–80 millimetres (2–3 in) long, 9–17 millimetres (0.4–0.7 in) wide, the same colour on both surfaces and have a distinct mid-vein on the lower surface.

The flowers are borne singly or in pairs in the axils of leaves on a stalk 7–15 millimetres (0.3–0.6 in) long and have 5 pointed sepals and 5 petals forming a tube or bell-shape. The tube is 5–6 millimetres (0.20–0.24 in) long with lobes about the same length or slightly shorter. The tube is white, sometimes spotted and is hairy inside and on the inner parts of the lobes. There are four stamens which extend beyond the petal tube. The fruits is a three or four-sided, cone-shaped drupe.

== Taxonomy ==
Myoporum stokesii was first formally described in 1935 by Forest B. H. Brown and the description was published in Bernice P. Bishop Museum Bulletin. The specific epithet stokesii honours the collector of the type specimen, A.M. Stokes.

== Distribution and habitat ==
Myoporum stokesii is only found on Raivavae where it grows on rocky hillsides.

== Conservation ==
Myoporum stokesii is listed as "critically endangered" in the IUCN Red List.
