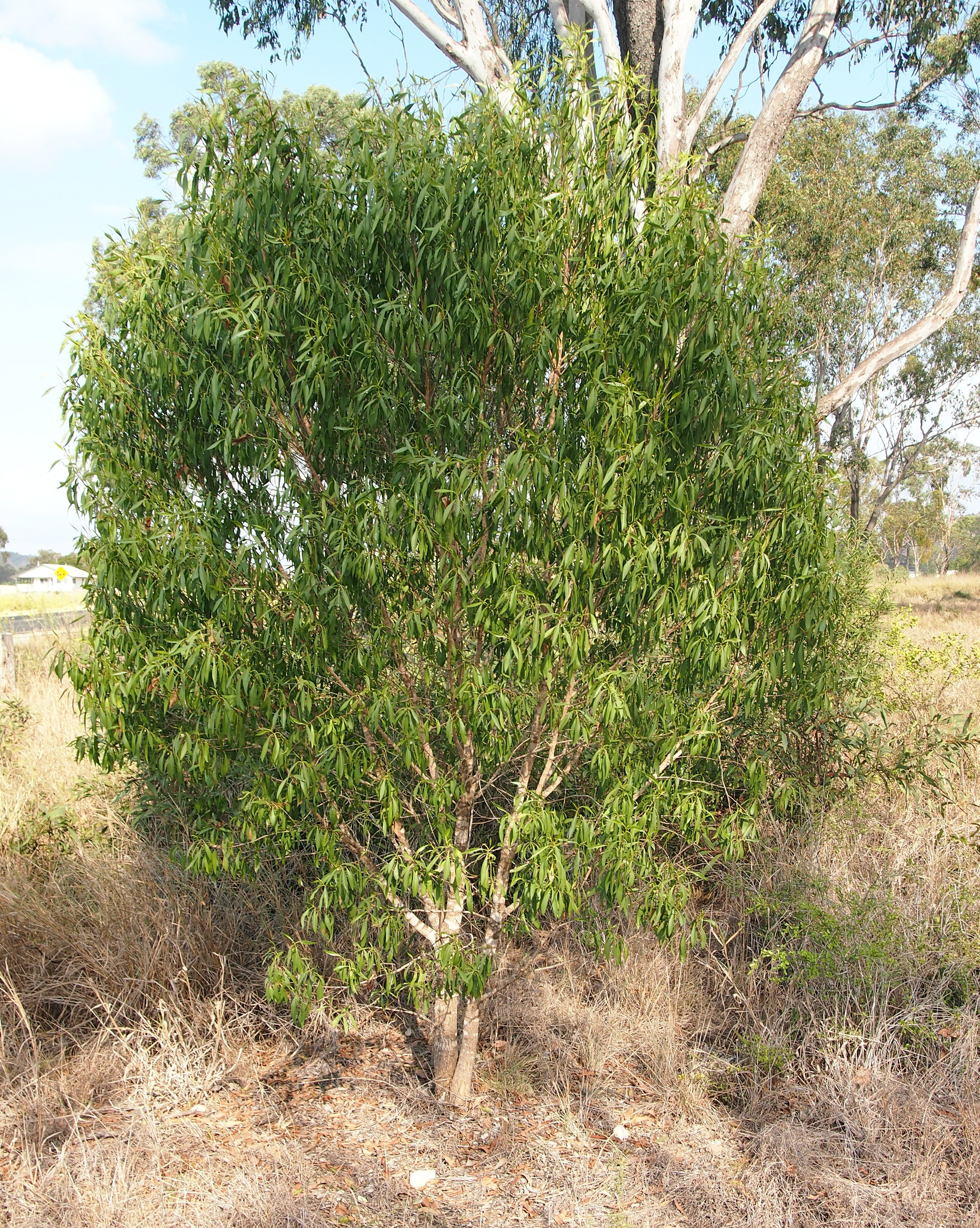

Conservation status
- Least Concern (IUCN 3.1)

Scientific classification
- Kingdom: Plantae
- Clade: Tracheophytes
- Clade: Angiosperms
- Clade: Eudicots
- Clade: Asterids
- Order: Lamiales
- Family: Scrophulariaceae
- Genus: Myoporum
- Species: M. montanum

Binomial name
- Myoporum montanum R. Br.

Synonyms
- Myoporum acuminatum var. angustifolium Benth.; Myoporum acuminatum var. parvifolium Benth.

= Myoporum montanum =

Boobialla

Species of plant

Myoporum montanum, commonly known as waterbush or boobialla, is a shrub native to Australia, New Guinea and Timor. The species is extremely variable in size growth habit and leaf form, with three primary forms recognised. Its occurrence in many places is restricted to coastal regions, watercourses and other locales with more reliable water supplies. It was this association with water that gave rise to the name water bush.

== Description ==
Myoporum montanum grows as a hairless shrub or small tree, up to 8 metres (30 ft) tall. It is difficult to distinguish from Myoporum acuminatum and the ranges of the two species overlap. George Bentham considered M. montanum to be a variety of Myoporum acuminatum. M. montanum has smaller, narrower leaves, the sepals of M. montanum lack the translucent margins of those of M. acuminatum. The fruit of M. montanum is also pink or light purple compared with the dark purple or blue fruit of M. acuminatum. The leaves of waterbush are variable in shape but are most often thin, linear to elliptic in shape, gradually tapering to the tip with the mid-vein visible on the lower side only. They are usually about 45–100 millimetres (2–4 in) long, 5–21 millimetres (0.2–0.8 in) wide, glabrous, the same colour on both sides and have smooth edges.

Sweet scented flowers grow in clusters of one to five from the leaf axils, on stalks 4.5–11 millimetres (0.2–0.4 in) long. There are 5 egg-shaped to triangular sepals with slightly papery margins but are only translucent near their base. The flowers feature five, rarely six white or occasionally light pink or purple petals, which may have rows of purple spots. The petals form a tube 2–5 millimetres (0.08–0.2 in) long, with lobes about the same length. The total diameter of the flower is about 6–8 millimetres (0.2–0.3 in). Flowering occurs mostly in winter and summer and is followed by fruits which are smooth or slightly rough drupes. The drupes are ovoid in shape, 5–8 millimetres (0.2–0.3 in) in diameter, light purple, red purple or brown in colour. Remnants of the flower style point out of the fruit.

There are three forms of this species, recognised by Robert Chinnock. They are:

- Type form, from the Blue Mountains has narrow, linear leaves and small flowers which are only faintly spotted, if at all;
- Desert form, from arid areas of Australia is a large shrub or small tree which has thick, elliptic leaves and flowers prominently spotted purplish red;
- Tropical form, from northern Australia, New Guinea, Timor has thin leaves and very small, unspotted white flowers.

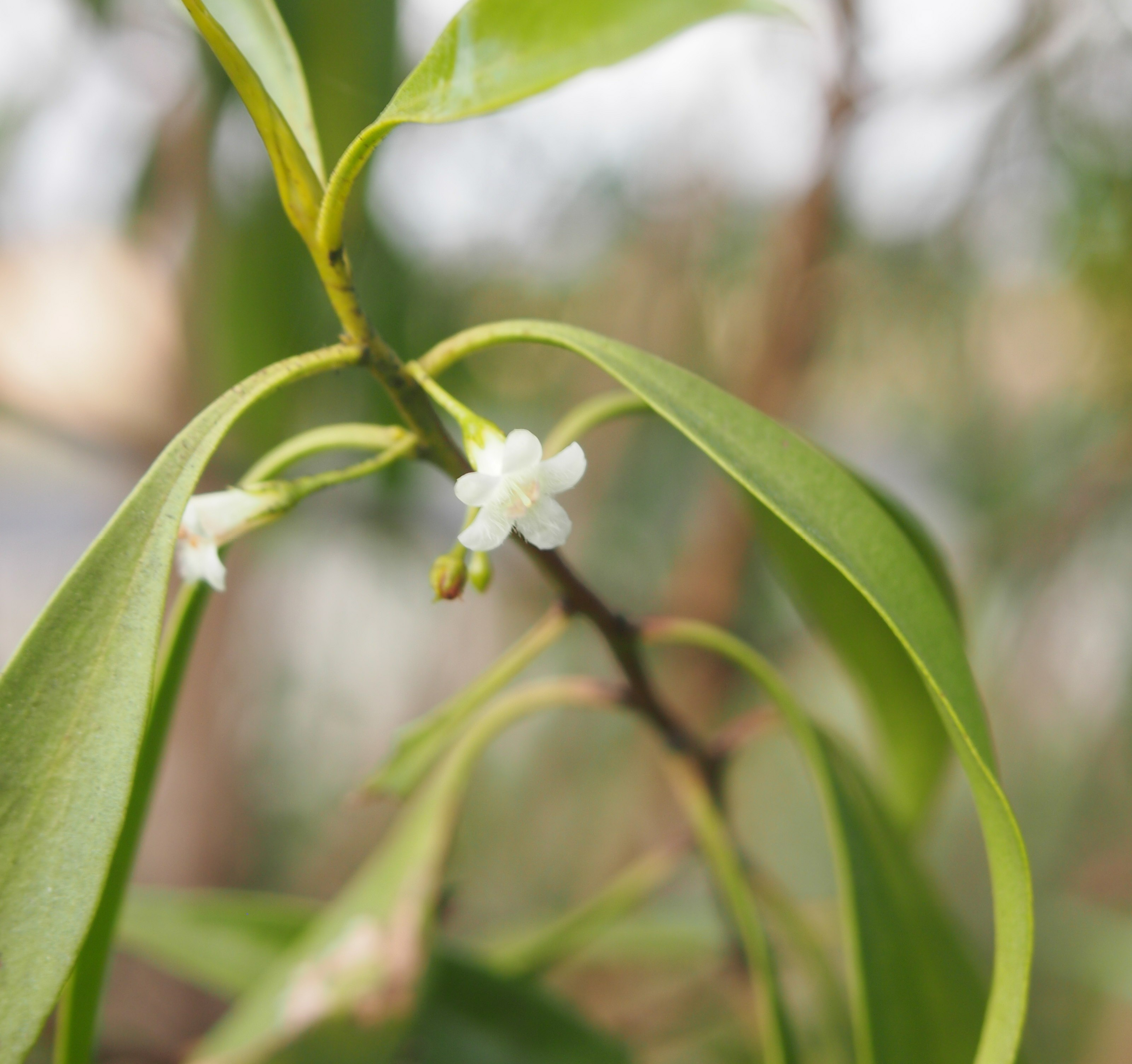
Myoporum montanum flower

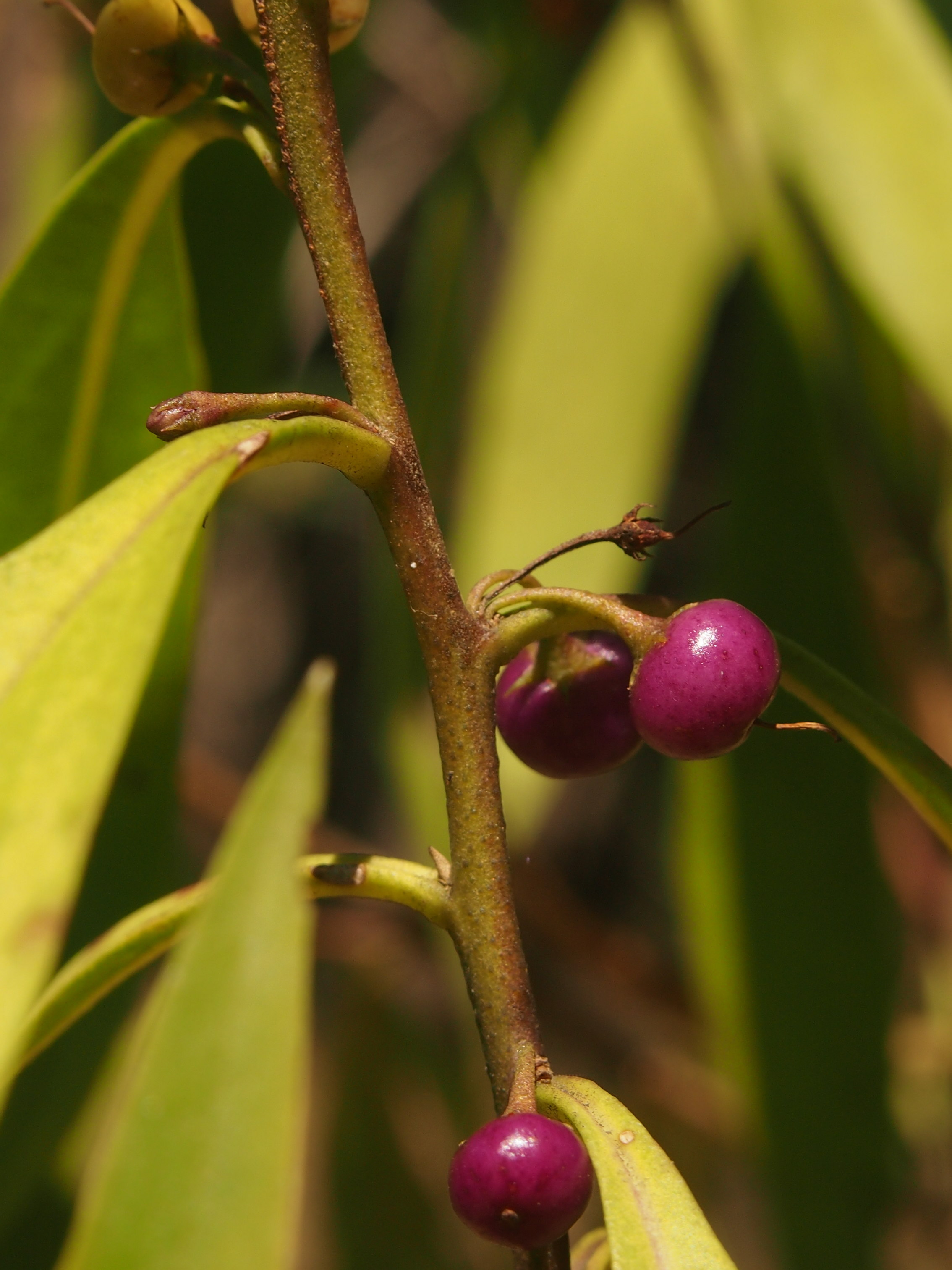
Myoporum montanum fruit

== Taxonomy and naming ==
Myoporum montanum was first formally described by Robert Brown in 1810 and the description was published in Prodromus Florae Novae Hollandiae. The specific epithet is derived from the "Latin montanum, pertaining to or growing on mountains".

== Distribution and habitat ==
Waterbush occurs in all mainland states of Australia. It occurs in scattered areas in New Guinea and Irian Jaya and there is one record from Timor. It is very common in eastern Queensland, New South Wales and eastern South Australia. It grows in a wide variety of ecosystem types, from mangrove swamps to rainforest to the Simpson Desert on a wide range of soils. Occurrences throughout the rest of the continent, New Guinea and Timor are largely restricted to coastal regions, watercourses and other locales with more reliable water supplies.

== Ecology ==
The fruit are a food source for a variety of birds, including emus, and were eaten by Aboriginal people. The food value of the fruits has been rated as low and it is known that some members of the genus contain liver toxins. The flavour is reported as being "bitterly aromatic and salty sweet".

== Use in horticulture ==
Waterbush is a hardy plant in cultivation and can tolerate drought. It is a useful screen plant in drier places and is readily propagated from cuttings.
