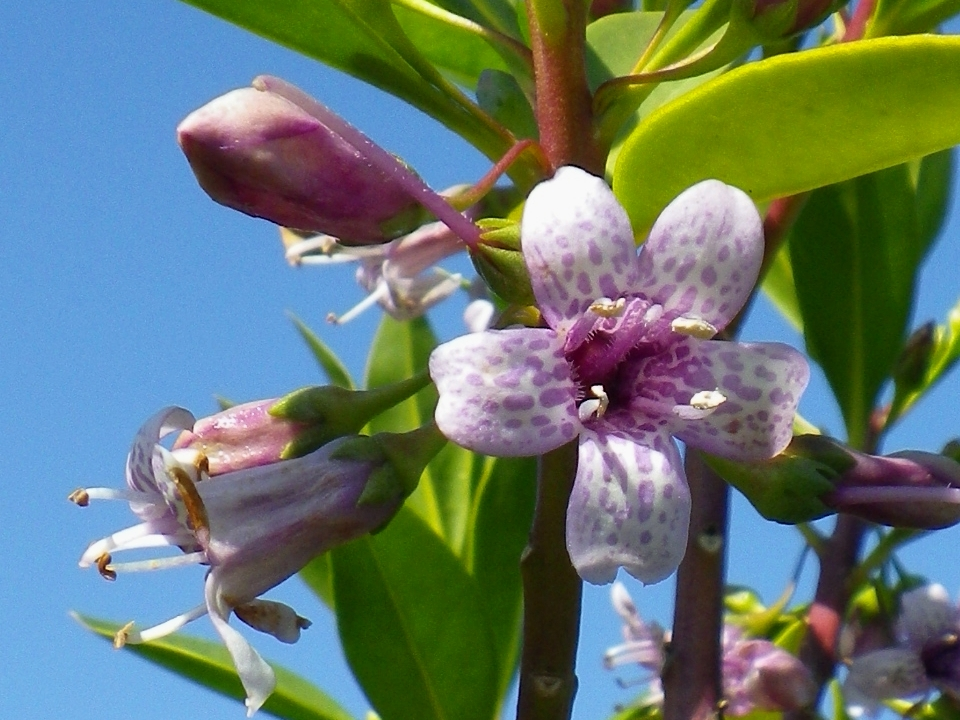
- In Reihoku, Japan

Scientific classification
- Kingdom: Plantae
- Clade: Tracheophytes
- Clade: Angiosperms
- Clade: Eudicots
- Clade: Asterids
- Order: Lamiales
- Family: Scrophulariaceae
- Tribe: Myoporeae
- Genus: Myoporum
- Species: M. bontioides

Binomial name
- Myoporum bontioides (Siebold & Zucc.) A.Gray

Synonyms
- Bontia bontioides (Siebold & Zucc.) Aver.; Myoporum chinensis A.Gray; Pentacoelium bontioides Siebold & Zucc.; Polycoelium bontioides (Siebold & Zucc.) A.DC.; Polycoelium chinense A.DC.

= Myoporum bontioides =

Species of shrub

Myoporum bontioides (Chinese: 苦槛蓝; pinyin: kujianlan) is a species of the flowering plant in the family Scrophulariaceae. It is a shrub growing in coastal areas of southern Japan and South China including beaches and estuaries where there are no large breaking waves.

== Description ==
Myoporum bontioides is a shrub sometimes growing to a height of 3 metres (10 ft) with branches that have raised leaf scars, are slightly sticky when young and have pale brown twigs. The leaves are arranged alternately, mostly 69–120 millimetres (3–5 in) long, 23–40 millimetres (0.9–2 in) wide, thick and elliptic in shape. They have an obvious mid-vein on the lower surface and are slightly sticky when young.

The flowers are arranged singly or in pairs in the axils of leaves on a stalk 14–27 millimetres (0.6–1 in) long. There are 5 egg-shaped, green, glabrous, pointed sepals and 5 petals joined at their bases, forming a bell-shaped tube. The petals are white to pale pinkish, spotted with purple on the petal lobes and inside the tube. The tube is 10.5–14 millimetres (0.4–0.6 in) long and the lobes are somewhat shorter than the tube. The outside of the tube is glabrous but the inside sometimes has a few hairs. There are 4 stamens which extend beyond the petal tube. Flowering occurs from April to June and is followed by purplish red, roughly spherical fruits, 10–15 millimetres (0.4–0.6 in) in diameter, which turn pale brown as they dry.

== Taxonomy and naming ==
Myoporum bontioides was first formally described in 1846 by Philipp Franz von Siebold and Joseph Gerhard Zuccarini who gave it the name Pentacoelium bontioides in Abhandlungen der Mathematisch-Physikalischen Klasse der Königlich Bayerischen Akademie der Wissenschaften. In 1862, Asa Gray transferred the species to Myoporum as M. bontioides in the Proceedings of the American Academy of Arts and Sciences. The specific epithet (bontioides) refers to the similarity of this species to plants in the genus Bontia.

== Distribution and habitat ==
Myoporum bontioides occurs in coastal areas of southern Japan, Taiwan, and South China including Hong Kong. It grows above the high tide line on beaches, around bays and along estuaries.
