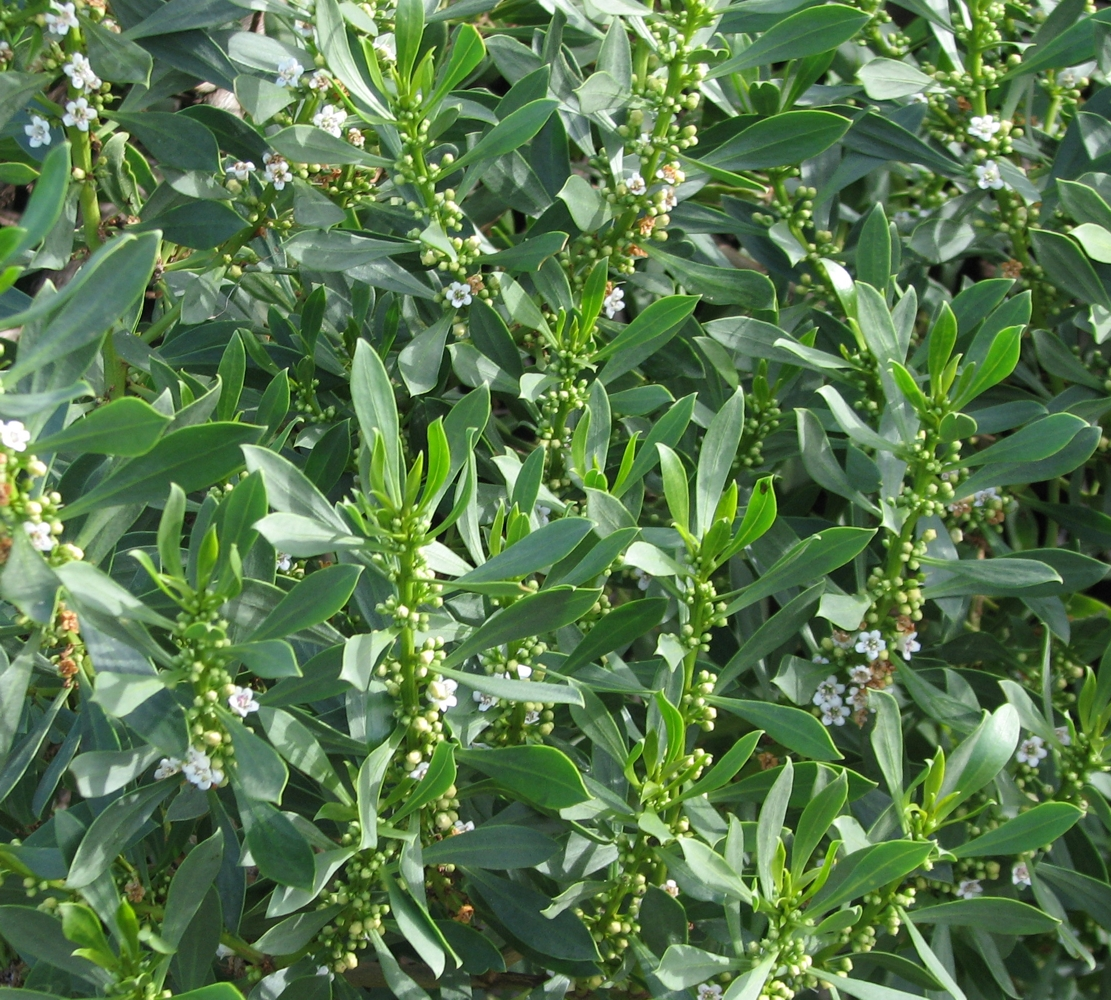
- At Black Rock, Victoria

Conservation status
- Least Concern (IUCN 3.1)

Scientific classification
- Kingdom: Plantae
- Clade: Tracheophytes
- Clade: Angiosperms
- Clade: Eudicots
- Clade: Asterids
- Order: Lamiales
- Family: Scrophulariaceae
- Genus: Myoporum
- Species: M. insulare

Binomial name
- Myoporum insulare R.Br.

Synonyms
- List: Bertolonia glandulosa Spin; Myoporum adscendens R.Br.; Myoporum glandulosum (Spin) Spin; Myoporum glandulosum ((Spin) A.DC. isonym; Myoporum mucronulatum A.DC.; Myoporum serratum var. glandulosum (Spin) Benth.; Myoporum serratum var. obovatum Benth.; Myoporum tasmanicum A.DC.; Myoporum tetrandrum var. adscendens (R.Br.) Domin nom. illeg.; Myoporum tetrandrum var. glandulosum (Spin) Domin; Myoporum serratum auct. non R.Br.: Bentham, G. (1870)

= Myoporum insulare =

Common boobialla

Species of plant

Myoporum insulare, commonly known as common boobialla, native juniper, is a species of flowering plant in the figwort family Scrophulariaceae and is endemic to coastal areas of Australia. It is a shrub or small tree which grows on dunes and coastal cliffs, is very salt tolerant and widely used in horticulture.

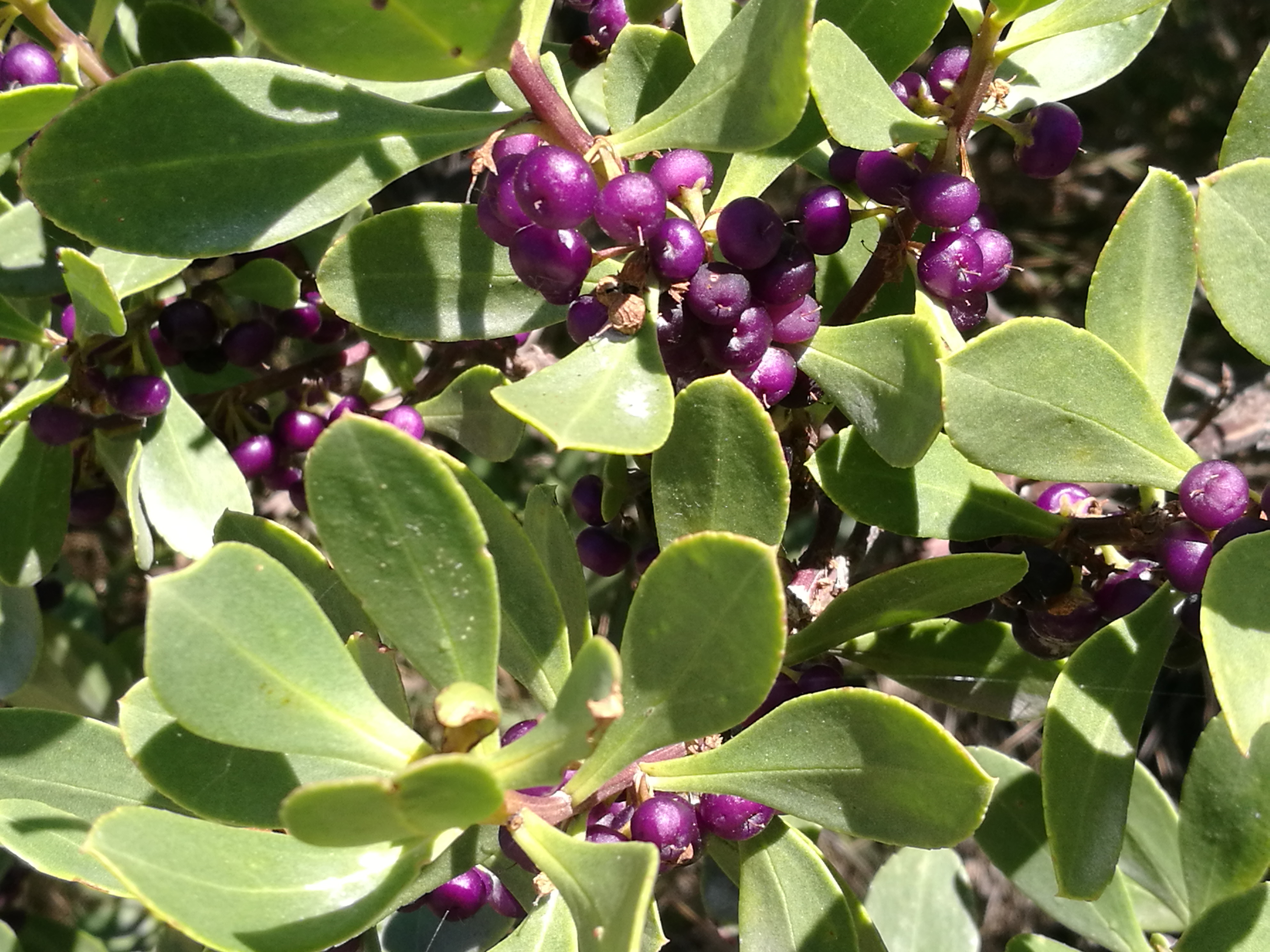
Myoporum insulare fruit

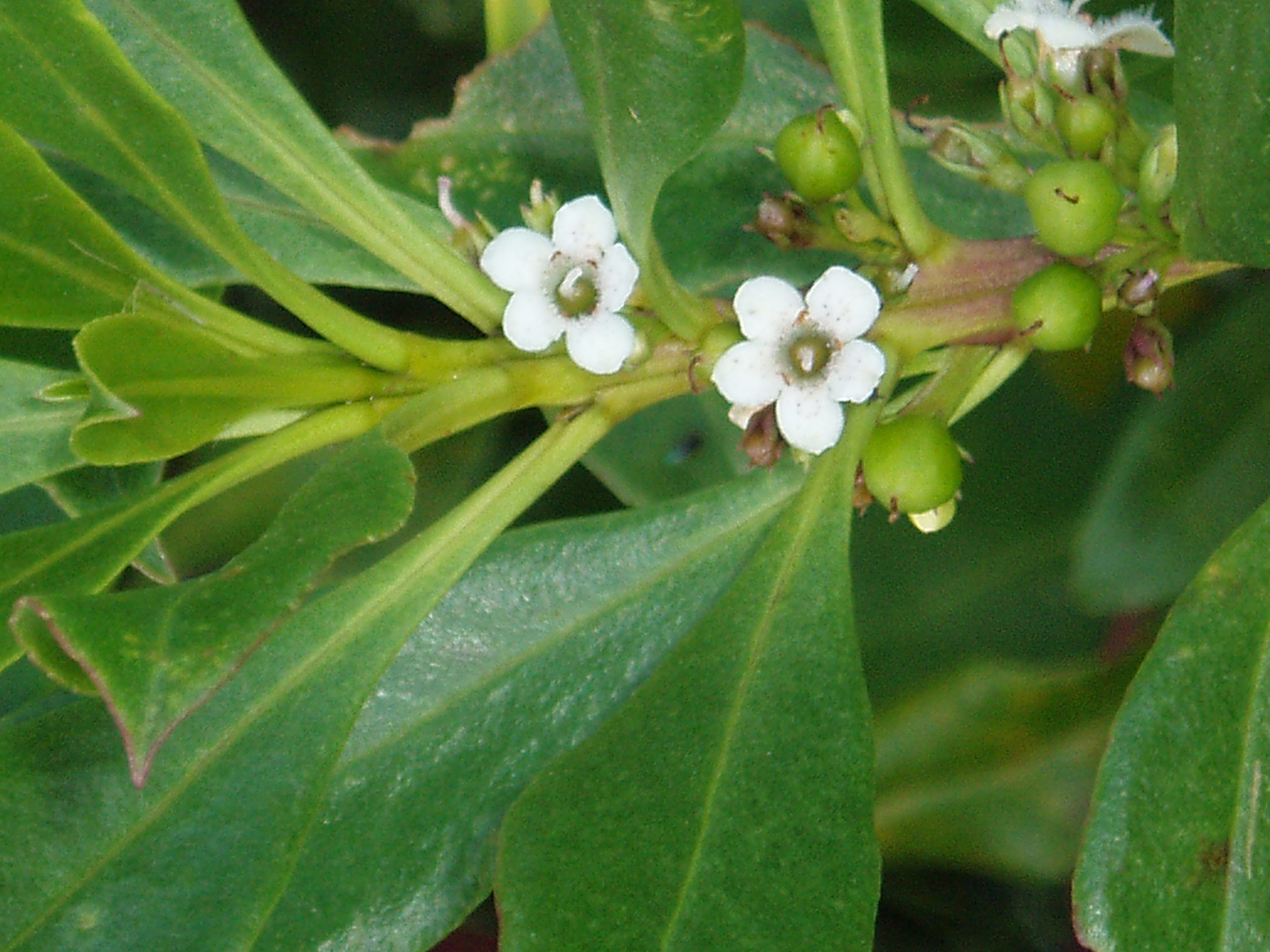
Fruit and flowers

== Description ==
Boobialla varies in form from a prostrate shrub to a small, erect tree growing to a height of 6 m (20 ft). It has thick, smooth green leaves which are 30–90 mm (1.2–3.5 in) long and 7–22 mm (0.28–0.87 in) wide with edges that are either untoothed or toothed toward the apex. The leaves are egg-shaped and the upper and lower surfaces are the same dull green colour.

White flowers with purple spots appear in the leaf axils in clusters of three to eight and are 6–8 mm (0.24–0.31 in) in diameter. There are five glabrous, smooth sepals and the tube formed by the petals is 2.3–3.6 mm (0.091–0.142 in) long with the lobes of the tube about the same length. The four stamens usually extend slightly beyond the tube. Peak flowering times are July to February in Western Australia and October to December in south-eastern Australia. Flowering is followed by the fruit which is a smooth, rounded purple to black drupe 4.5–9 mm (0.18–0.35 in) in diameter.

== Taxonomy and naming ==
Myoporum insulare was first formally described by botanist Robert Brown in Prodromus Florae Novae Hollandiae in 1810. The specific epithet insulare is a Latin word meaning "from an island".

== Distribution and habitat ==
Myoporum insulare occurs in coastal areas of New South Wales, Victoria, South Australia, Western Australia and Tasmania. In New South Wales it occurs from Eden southward, although an isolated occurrence was recorded much further north on Brush Island. It is also found on Lord Howe Island. In Victoria it is found in coastal areas but also inland in the west of that state. Boobialla is common along the coast of South Australia and in Western Australia it occurs south from Shark Bay to the South Australian border. It grows in sandy soils, often between rocks or near sandstone. Myoporum insulare is invasive in several African countries and in the western coastal areas of the US. Invasive populations may include some other species of this genus. In South Africa this species is known as manatoka.

== Uses ==
=== Horticulture ===
Myoporum insulare may be used as a fast-growing hedge or windbreak species which withstands coastal winds and drought. It is hardy in well-drained positions and is easily propagated from cuttings. It is also used as rootstock for propagating many Eremophila species.

=== Bush tucker ===
The purple fruit is edible, and is good for making jams and jellies.
