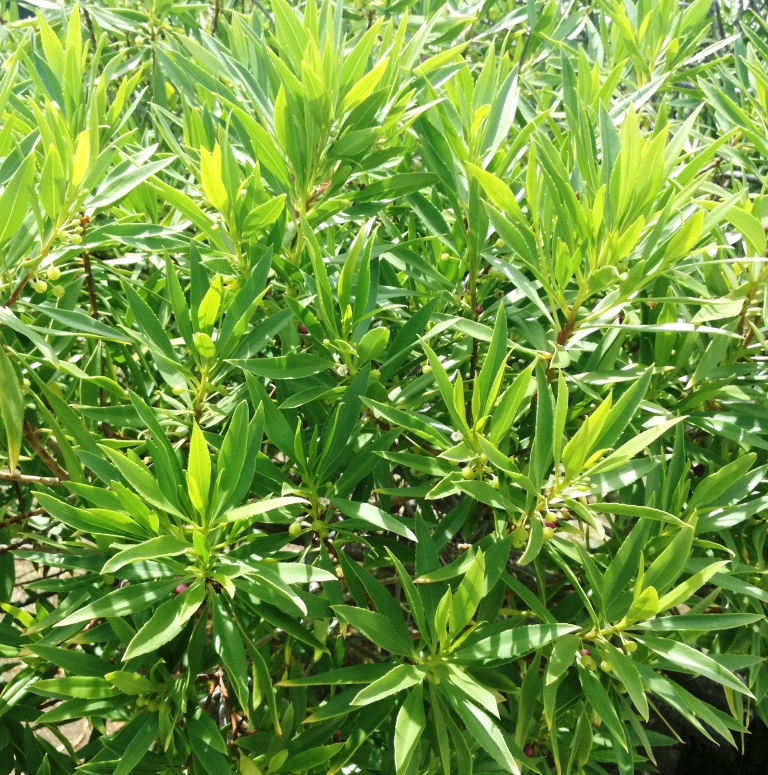

Scientific classification
- Kingdom: Plantae
- Clade: Tracheophytes
- Clade: Angiosperms
- Clade: Eudicots
- Clade: Asterids
- Order: Lamiales
- Family: Scrophulariaceae
- Genus: Myoporum
- Species: M. mauritianum

Binomial name
- Myoporum mauritianum A.DC.

= Myoporum mauritianum =

Species of flowering plant

Myoporum mauritianum is a species of flowering plant in the figwort family Scrophulariaceae and is endemic to a few volcanic islands in the Indian Ocean. It is a small, low-branched shrub with serrated leaves and small white flowers and usually grows on calcarenite within 20 metres (70 ft) of the sea.

== Description ==
Myoporum mauritianum is a low shrub, usually growing to no more than 1 metre (3 ft). It has thick, lance-shaped leaves with serrated edges and are about 44–66 millimetres (2–3 in) long and 7.5–12 millimetres (0.3–0.5 in) wide.

The flowers occur singly or in pairs in the axils of the leaves on a stalk 9–14.5 millimetres (0.4–0.6 in) long and there are 5 triangular sepals. The petals are white and form a tube 2.5–4 millimetres (0.1–0.2 in) long with the lobes spreading to about 2 millimetres (0.08 in). The fruit is a yellow, roughly spherical drupe.

== Taxonomy and naming ==
Myoporum mauritianum was first formally described by botanist Alphonse de Candolle in Prodromus Florae Novae Hollandiae in 1810. The specific epithet mauitianum is the latinised form of Mauritius.

== Distribution and habitat ==
Myoporum mauritianum occurs on the island of Rodrigues in the Republic of Mauritius where there are a few individual plants. Larger populations are found on a few smaller islands near Rodrigues but the species is thought to be extinct on Mauritius, where the type specimen was found.

== Conservation ==
Myoporum mauritianum was listed as "endangered" on Rodrigues and extinct on Mauritius in the 1997 IUCN Red List of Threatened Plants. It has not yet been assessed for the 2014-2015 version.
