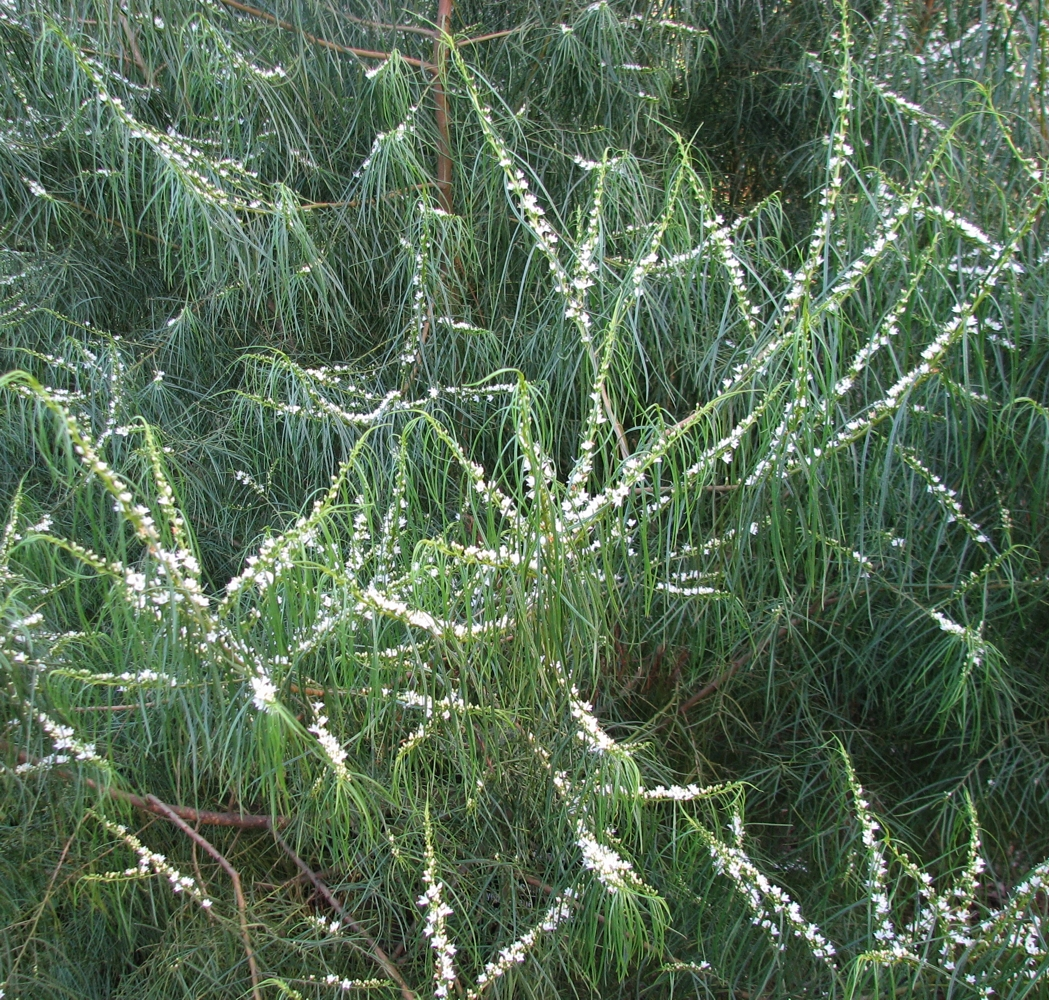
- Myoporum floribundum in the Royal Botanic Gardens Melbourne

Scientific classification
- Kingdom: Plantae
- Clade: Tracheophytes
- Clade: Angiosperms
- Clade: Eudicots
- Clade: Asterids
- Order: Lamiales
- Family: Scrophulariaceae
- Genus: Myoporum
- Species: M. floribundum

Binomial name
- Myoporum floribundum A.Cunn. ex Benth.

Synonyms
- Disoon floribundus (A.Cunn. ex Benth.) A.DC.

= Myoporum floribundum =

Weeping myoporum

Species of shrub

Myoporum floribundum, commonly known as weeping myoporum or slender myoporum, is a sour-smelling glabrous shrub in the family Scrophulariaceae endemic to a small area of New South Wales and Victoria in Australia. It has long, thin, drooping leaves and profuse white flowers in clusters along the stems in spring. Although it is uncommon in nature, it has long been available as a popular garden plant.

== Description ==
Myoporum floribundum is an erect, spindly shrub which grows to a height of about 3 metres (10 ft). It has dark green, drooping leaves which are 20–110 millimetres (0.8–4 in) long, 1–2.5 millimetres (0.04–0.1 in) wide, linear in shape and dumbbell shaped in cross section.

The flowers are white and sometimes so profuse that the branches appear as if covered with snow. They are arranged in clusters of between 6 and 8 in the leaf axils over many months but especially from October to December. The flowers have 5 sepals and 5 white petals joined at their bases to form a tube. The tube is 1.7–2 millimetres (0.067–0.079 in) long and the lobes are spreading, 2.2–3 millimetres (0.09–0.1 in) long with a pointed tip. There are 4 stamens which extend beyond the petals. The fruit is a flattened drupe which is brown when mature and 2–2.8 millimetres (0.08–0.1 in) long.

== Taxonomy and naming ==
Myoporum floribundum was first formally described in 1837 by George Bentham in Enumeratio plantarum quas in Novae Hollandiae ora austro-occidentali ad fluvium Cygnorum et in sinu Regis Georgii collegit Carolus Liber Baro de Hügel, the original having been written by Allan Cunningham (botanist) but not published. The specific epithet is derived from the "Latin floribundum, "profusely flowering".

== Distribution and habitat ==
There are two disjunct populations of Myoporum floribundum, one in New South Wales and the other in Victoria. In New South Wales, the species is found below Jenolan Caves and near the Nepean River growing in sclerophyll forest. In Victoria it is found in the Upper Snowy River and Deddick River valleys where it grows in woodland on steep gravelly slopes.

== Use in horticulture ==
The unusual foliage and profuse white flowers are the attractions of this species which has been known in cultivation for many years. It requires good drainage and at least partial sun but is frost and drought tolerant. It can be grown from seeds or from cuttings but does not respond well to harsh pruning.
