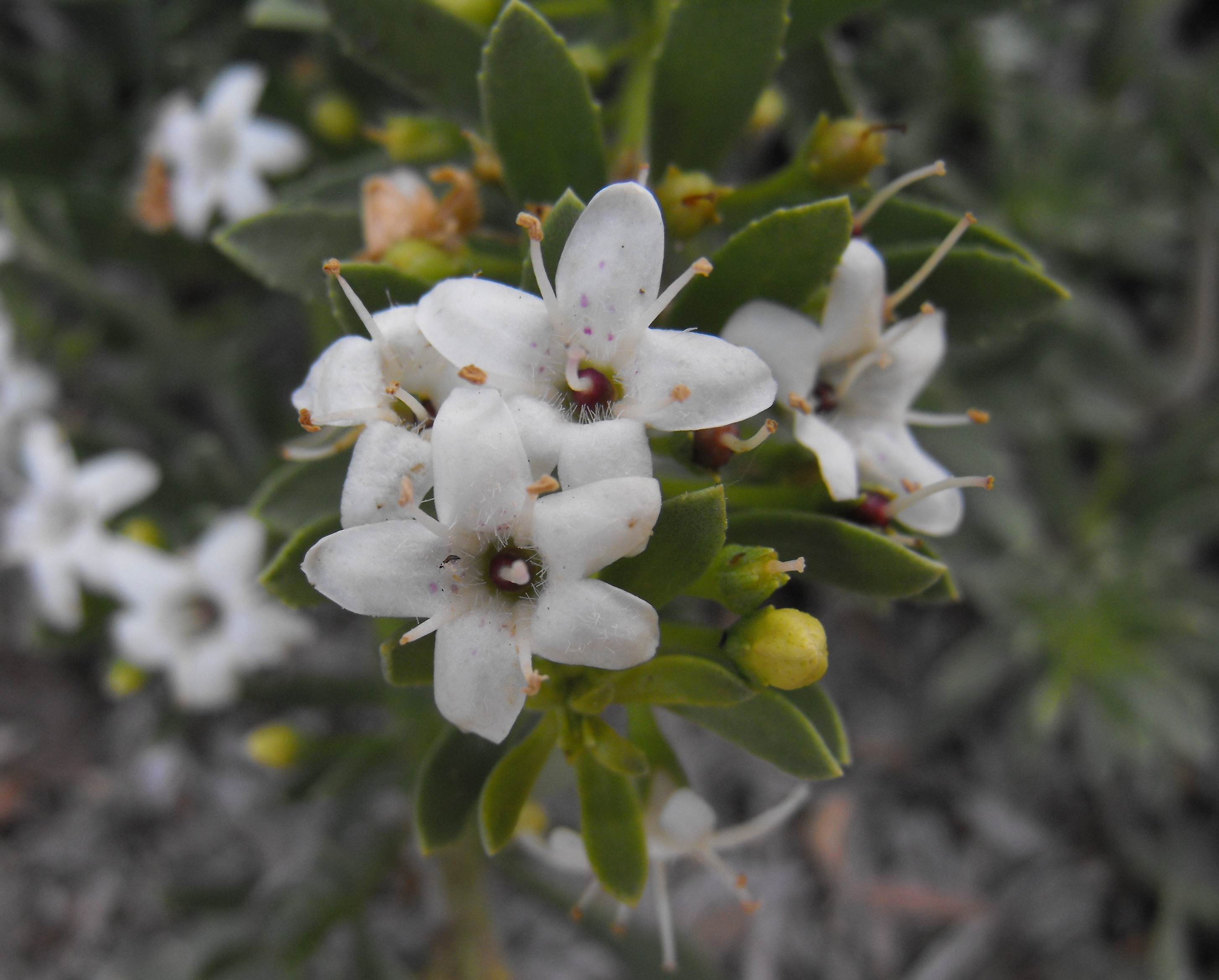
- Myoporum parvifolium at San Diego Botanic Garden

Scientific classification
- Kingdom: Plantae
- Clade: Tracheophytes
- Clade: Angiosperms
- Clade: Eudicots
- Clade: Asterids
- Order: Lamiales
- Family: Scrophulariaceae
- Genus: Myoporum
- Species: M. parvifolium

Binomial name
- Myoporum parvifolium R.Br.

Synonyms
- Myoporum humile R.Br.

= Myoporum parvifolium =

Creeping boobialla

Species of plant

Myoporum parvifolium, commonly known as creeping boobialla, creeping myoporum, dwarf native myrtle or small leaved myoporum is a plant in the figwort family, Scrophulariaceae. It is a low, spreading shrub with long, trailing stems and white, star-shaped flowers and is endemic to southern Australia including Flinders Island.

== Description ==
Creeping boobialla is a prostrate, spreading shrub sometimes forming a mat 3 metres (10 ft) in diameter. Its leaves are fleshy and glabrous, usually 18–40 millimetres (0.7–2 in) long, 3–6.5 millimetres (0.1–0.3 in) wide and egg-shaped with the narrower end towards the base. They are arranged alternately, sometimes have a few serrations on the margins near the leaf tip and sometimes have raised, wart-like tubercles on their surface.

White flowers with purple spots appear in the leaf axils singly or in clusters of two or three on a stalk 7.5–33 millimetres (0.3–1 in) long. The flowers have five lance-shaped sepals and five petals joined at their bases to form a tube. The tube is about 3 millimetres (0.1 in) long and the lobes are spreading, blunt and 3–4 millimetres (0.1–0.2 in) long. As a result, the diameter of the flower is about 7.5 millimetres (0.3 in). There are four stamens which extend beyond the petals. Peak flowering times are winter to summer in New South Wales and October to March in South Australia and the fruit that follows are succulent, rounded, yellowish-white and up to 8.5 millimetres (0.3 in) in diameter.

== Taxonomy and naming ==
Myoporum parvifolium was first formally described by botanist Robert Brown in Prodromus Florae Novae Hollandiae in 1810. The specific epithet parvifolium is derived from the Latin parvus, "small" and folium, "leaf".

== Distribution and habitat ==
Myoporum parvifolium occurs in the south-west corner of New South Wales, and from the Eyre Peninsula in South Australia eastwards to Victoria. It is common along much of the Murray River in South Australia. It often grows on limestone cliffs, along river flats and in woodland in sandy sometimes saline soils.

== Use in horticulture ==
Creeping boobialla is a useful ground cover and is often cultivated for that purpose. It prefers a well-drained, sunny position but is hardy in most situations. It is usually propagated from cuttings and has been used as a rootstock for more difficult related species such as Eremophila.
