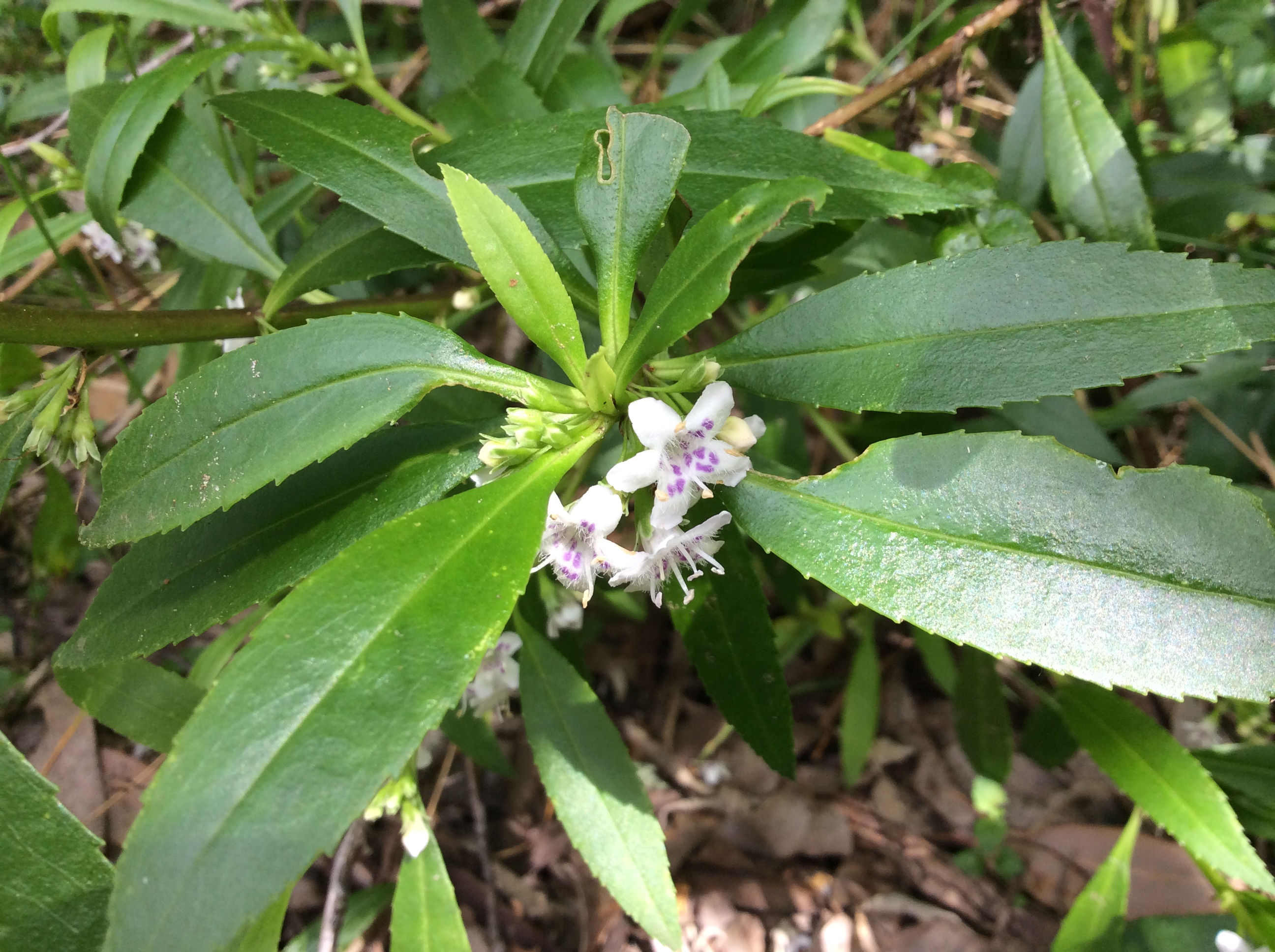
- Myoporum tetrandrum in the Porongurup National Park

Scientific classification
- Kingdom: Plantae
- Clade: Tracheophytes
- Clade: Angiosperms
- Clade: Eudicots
- Clade: Asterids
- Order: Lamiales
- Family: Scrophulariaceae
- Genus: Myoporum
- Species: M. tetrandrum

Binomial name
- Myoporum tetrandrum (Labill.) Domin

Synonyms
- Pogonia tetrandra Labill.; Myoporum tuberculatum R.Br.; Myoporum tetrandrum var. tuberculatum (R.Brl.) Domin

= Myoporum tetrandrum =

Slender myoporum

Species of flowering plant

Myoporum tetrandrum, commonly known as slender myoporum or boobialla is a plant in the figwort family, Scrophulariaceae. It is an erect and spreading shrub endemic to the south-west of Western Australia, common in moist areas and like most of the other members of its genus has bell shaped, star-like white flowers in the leaf axils.

== Description ==
Myoporum tetrandrum is a shrub sometimes growing to a height of 3 metres (10 ft) with young branches that are glabrous and rather flattened. Its leaves are arranged alternately and are usually 32–80 millimetres (1–3 in) long, 3–10 millimetres (0.1–0.4 in) wide, elliptic in shape and usually have small teeth or serrations in approximately the outer half. The leaves are a similar deep green colour on both surfaces and the lower surface has a distinct mid-vein.

The flowers are borne in groups of about 5 to 7 (sometimes more or fewer) on a stalk 4–7.5 millimetres (0.2–0.3 in) long. The flowers have 5 egg-shaped sepals and 5 petals, joined at their bases to form a tube. The petals are white with purple spots on the lobes of the tube and the upper part of the tube. The tube is about 2.5–4 millimetres (0.1–0.2 in) long and the lobes are slightly shorter than the tube. The inside of the tube and part of the lobes are hairy. There are 4 stamens which extend beyond the petals. Flowers are often present from May to January and the fruits that follow are green and fleshy at first but dry when mature.

== Taxonomy and naming ==
Myoporum tetrandrum was first formally described by Jacques Labillardière in 1805 as Pogonia tetrandra. In 1923, Karel Domin changed the name to Myoporum tetrandrum, describing the change in Vestnik Kralovske Ceske Spolecnosti Nauk, Trida Matematiko-Prirodevedecke. The specific epithet (tetrandra) is derived from the ancient Greek tetra- (τετρα-), meaning "four" and anēr, genitive andros (ἀνήρ, genitive ἀνδρός), meaning "male" or in this case "stamen".

== Distribution and habitat ==
Slender myoporum occurs in Western Australia in near-coastal areas between the Stirling Range and Israelite Bay in the Esperance Plains, Jarrah Forest, Mallee and Warren biogeographic regions. It grows in sandy soil, usually in damp places like floodplains and along streams, often in association with Melaleuca species.

== Ecology ==
Myoporum tetrandrum contains a high percentage (up to 0.5%) of sesquiterpene essential oil making the plant toxic to livestock which suffer liver damage.

== Use in horticulture ==
Slender myoporum is a hardy plant in well-drained soil in full sun and is most easily propagated from cuttings. It grows well in Portugal and is naturalised there.
