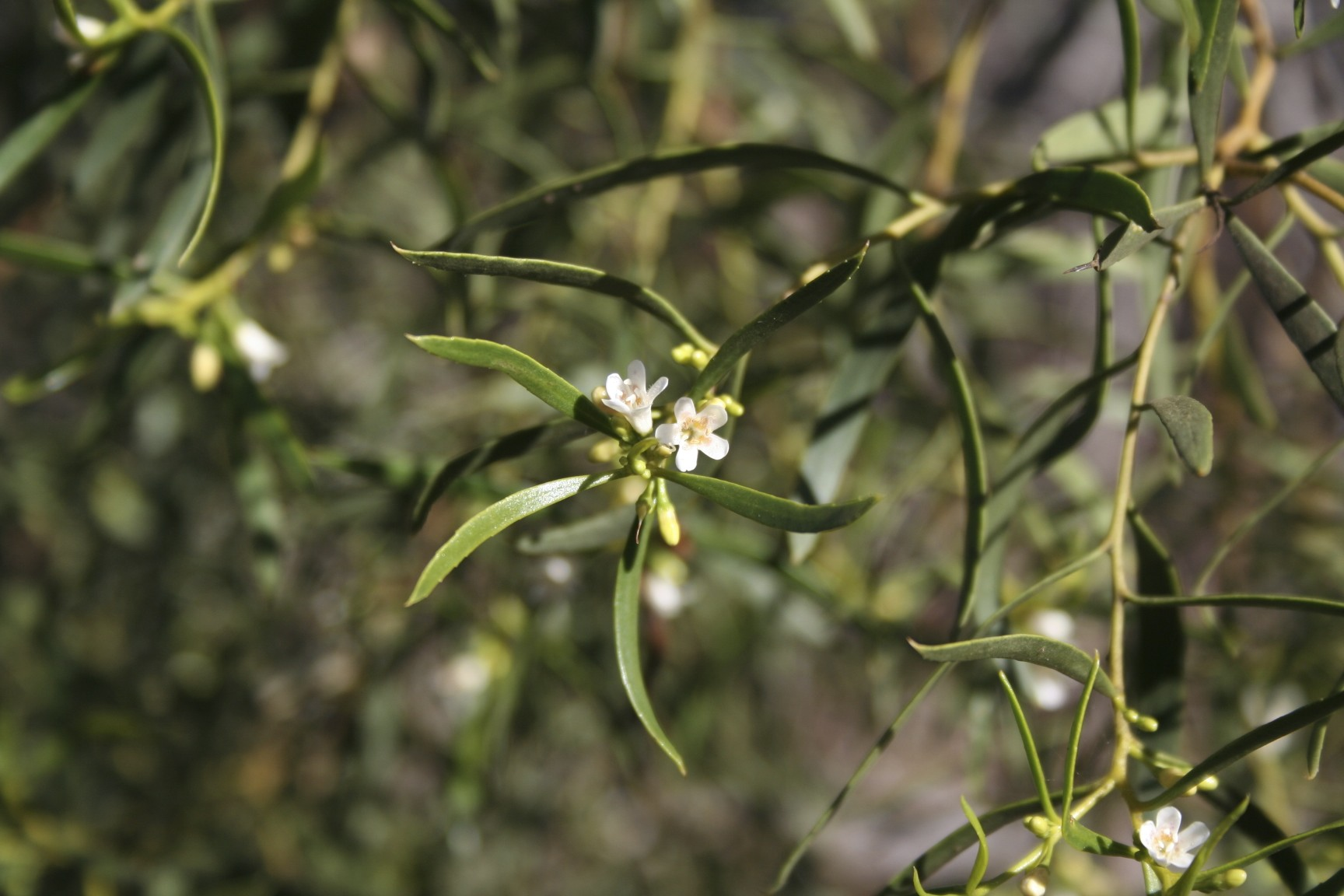
- Myoporum platycarpum growing near Cocklebiddy in the Nuytsland Nature Reserve

Scientific classification
- Kingdom: Plantae
- Clade: Embryophytes
- Clade: Tracheophytes
- Clade: Spermatophytes
- Clade: Angiosperms
- Clade: Eudicots
- Clade: Asterids
- Order: Lamiales
- Family: Scrophulariaceae
- Genus: Myoporum
- Species: M. platycarpum

Binomial name
- Myoporum platycarpum R.Br.

Synonyms
- Myoporum humile R.Br.

= Myoporum platycarpum =

Sugarwood

Species of plant

Myoporum platycarpum, known by several common names including sugarwood, false sandalwood and ngural is a plant in the figwort family, Scrophulariaceae. It is rounded with bright green foliage as a young shrub and roughly fissured, dark grey bark when mature. Sugarwood is endemic to the southern half of continental Australia.

== Description ==
Sugarwood is a rounded shrub or small tree growing to a height of 10 m (30 ft) with foliage and branches that are glabrous but often covered with small raised, wart-like tubercles. The bark on mature specimens is rough, dark grey, flaky bark. Its leaves are arranged alternately and are usually 37–72 mm (1–3 in) long, 4–9 mm (0.2–0.4 in) wide, linear to elliptic in shape and usually have small teeth or serrations in the outer half. The leaves are often curved or have a hook on the end and both surfaces are deep green in colour.

The flowers are borne in groups of about 5 to 8 (sometimes more or fewer) on a stalk 3.8–7.2 mm (0.1–0.3 in) long. The flowers have five triangular sepals and five petals, joined at their bases to form a tube. The petals are white or very pale pink to purple sometimes spotted orange or yellow. The tube is about 1.9–4 mm (0.07–0.2 in) long and the lobes are spreading, blunt and 1.6–4.8 mm (0.06–0.2 in) long. The inside of the tube and part of the lobes are hairy. There are 4 stamens which extend beyond the petals. The main flowering season is from August to November and the fruits that follow are green and fleshy at first but dry when mature.

== Taxonomy and naming ==
Myoporum platycarpum was first formally described by botanist Robert Brown in Prodromus Florae Novae Hollandiae in 1810.

There are two subspecies:

- Myoporum platycarpum R.Br. subsp. platycarpum has petal lobes that are shorter than the petal tube and as a mature tree has curved or bending branches;
- Myoporum platycarpum subsp. perbellum Chinnock has petal lobes that are equal to or longer than the petal tube and as a mature tree has straight branches.

The specific epithet platycarpum is derived from the ancient Greek platys (πλατύς), broad, flat; karpos (καρπός), fruit. The epithet perbellum is from the "Latin, perbellum very beautiful".

== Distribution and habitat ==
Both subspecies of M. platycarpum occur in inland areas of New South Wales, north-western Victoria and the southern half of South Australia. Only subspecies platycarpum occurs in south-eastern Western Australia and in the far south east of Queensland. It often grows in mallee or Belah woodland.

== Uses ==
=== Horticulture ===
Sugarwood is a hardy and attractive plant useful for shade, shelter or as a screening plant in drier climates.

=== Timber ===
Sugarwood is hard and dense, yellow and streaked brown with small black features. It smells of sugar when it is worked.
