= Myoporum rimatarense =

Conservation status
- Extinct (IUCN 3.1)

Scientific classification
- Kingdom: Plantae
- Clade: Tracheophytes
- Clade: Angiosperms
- Clade: Eudicots
- Clade: Asterids
- Order: Lamiales
- Family: Scrophulariaceae
- Genus: Myoporum
- Species: †M. rimatarense

Binomial name
- †Myoporum rimatarense F.Br.

Species of flowering plant

Myoporum rimatarense was a plant in the figwort family, Scrophulariaceae and was endemic to Rimatara Island in French Polynesia. It is only known from the type specimen collected in 1921 and 1934 and was declared extinct in 2021 by the IUCN Red List.

== Description ==
Myoporum rimatarense is a small tree growing to a height of 6 metres (20 ft). The leaves are arranged alternately and are 66–80 millimetres (2.6–3.1 in) long, 22–35 millimetres (0.9–1 in) wide, the same colour on both surfaces and with a mid-vein visible on the lower surface.

The flowers are borne singly or in groups of up to 4 in the axils of leaves on stalks 6–8.5 millimetres (0.2–0.3 in) long and have 5 pointed sepals. The size, shape and colour of the petals and stamens is not known. The fruit is a more or less spherical drupe.

== Taxonomy ==
Myoporum rimatarense was first formally described in 1935 by Forest B. H. Brown and the description was published in Bernice P. Bishop Museum Bulletin. The specific epithet rimatarense refers to the name of the island where the type specimen was collected by A.M.Stokes.

== Distribution and habitat ==
Myoporum rimatarense was only found on Rimatara Island. The type specimen was collected on a sandy beach near the village of Amaru.

== Conservation ==
An extensive search in 2004 failed to find a single specimen and the species is now presumed extinct.
