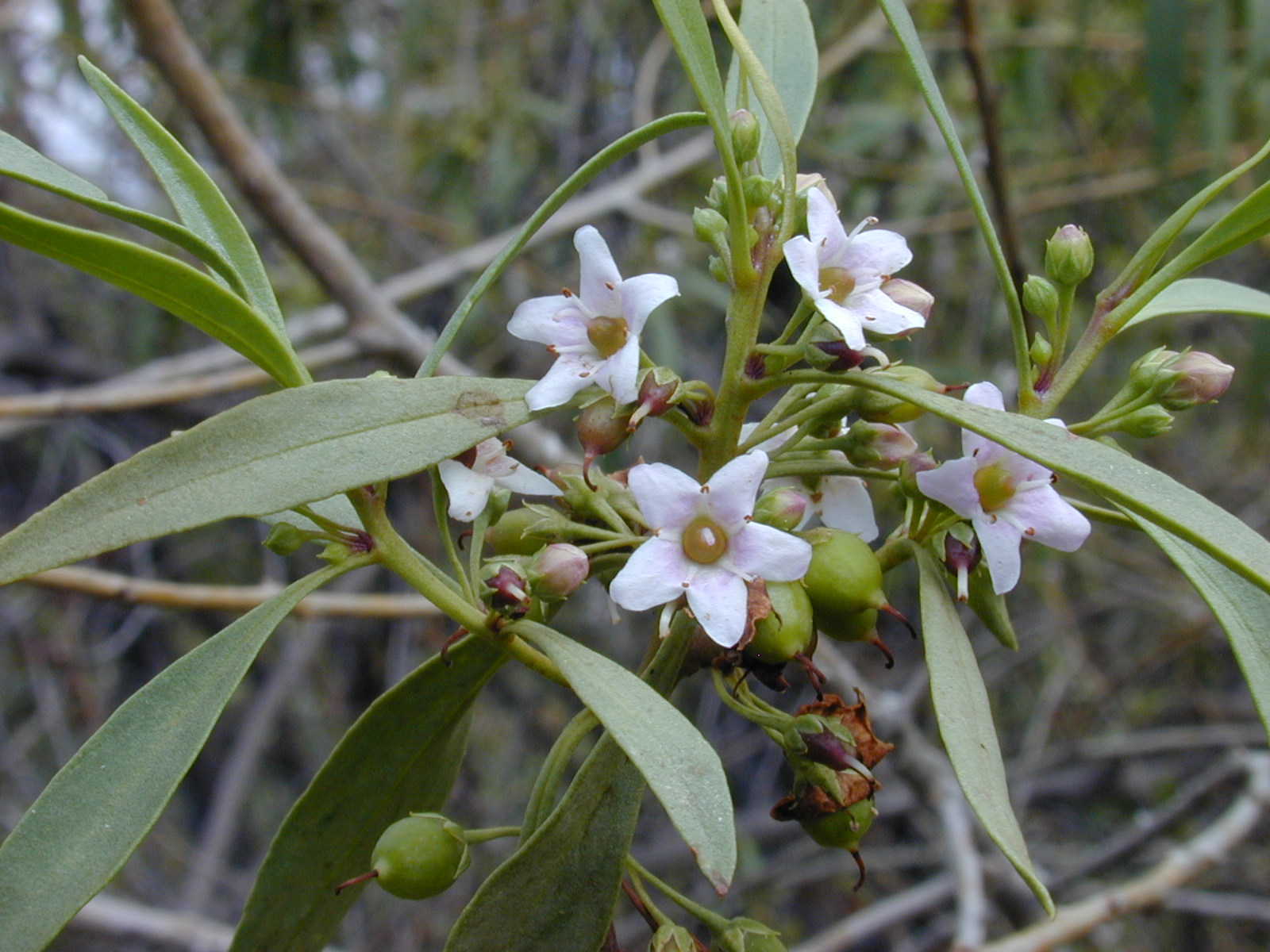
- Naio (Myoporum sandwicense)

Scientific classification
- Kingdom: Plantae
- Clade: Embryophytes
- Clade: Tracheophytes
- Clade: Angiosperms
- Clade: Eudicots
- Clade: Asterids
- Order: Lamiales
- Family: Scrophulariaceae
- Tribe: Myoporeae
- Genus: Myoporum; Banks & Sol. ex G.Forst.

Species
- See text.

= Myoporum =

Genus of flowering plants

Myoporum is a genus of flowering plants in the figwort family, Scrophulariaceae (formerly placed in Myoporaceae). There are 30 species in the genus, eighteen of which are endemic to Australia although others are endemic to Pacific Islands, including New Zealand, and one is endemic to two Indian Ocean islands. They are shrubs or small trees with leaves that are arranged alternately and have white, occasionally pink flowers and a fruit that is a drupe.

== Description ==
Plants in this genus are shrubs or small trees, mostly glabrous with simple leaves that are arranged alternately and often lack a petiole (although the leaves often taper towards the base). The flowers are adapted for pollination by insects and have white, (sometimes pinkish) petals and usually 4 stamens. The fruit is a drupe with its central seed surrounded by a hard endocarp and usually succulent mesocarp.

== Taxonomy and naming ==
The genus Myoporum was first formally described in 1786 by Georg Forster, from an unpublished description by Joseph Banks and Daniel Solander. The name Myoporum is derived from the Ancient Greek myo meaning "to close" or "to be shut" and poros meaning "pore", referring to the ability of (some) plants in this genus to exist in dry areas, or possibly to the appearance of the glands on the leaves.

Recent molecular work into the Mypoporeae family seems to indicate that the genus Myoporum is nested within Eremophila, and is thus paraphyletic.

== Distribution ==
There are 30 species in the genus, which is spread from Mauritius, across Australia to the Pacific Islands. Eighteen species are endemic to Australia.

== Ecology ==
Myoporum insulare is invasive in several African countries and in the western coastal areas of the United States. In South Africa this species is known as manatoka. Some species, including M. insulare and M. laetum are known to be poisonous to stock.

== Use in horticulture ==
M. parvifolium, M. floribundum and M. bateae are often cultivated as ornamentals, hedges or windbreaks. M. insulare, M. montanum, M. acuminatum and sometimes M. parvifolium are often used as rootstock for Eremophila species, especially those that are difficult to grow from cuttings or that are to be grown in heavier soils.

== Species list ==
The following is a list of the species of Myoporum accepted by the Australian Plant Census for Australian species and Plants of the World Online for others:

- Myoporum acuminatum R.Br. – pointed boobialla (Australia)
- Myoporum bateae F.Muell. (New South Wales)
- Myoporum betcheanum L.S.Sm. – mountain boobialla (New South Wales, Queensland)
- Myoporum boninense Koidz. (New South Wales, Queensland, Bonin to Mariana Islands)
- Myoporum bontioides (Siebold & Zucc.) A.Gray (south-east China to northern Vietnam, southern Japan to Taiwan)
- Myoporum brevipes Benth. – pale myoporum (mainly South Australia)
- Myoporum caprarioides Benth. – slender myoporum (Western Australia)
- Myoporum cordifolium (F.Muell.) Druce – Jerramungup myoporum (Western Australia)
- Myoporum crassifolium G.Forst. (New Caledonia, Vanuatu)
- Myoporum cuneifolium Kraenzl. (New Caledonia)
- Myoporum floribundum A.Cunn. ex Benth. – weeping boobialla (Australia: New South Wales, Victoria)
- Myoporum insulare R.Br. – boobialla, blueberry tree (Australia)
- Myoporum laetum G.Forst. – ngaio (New Zealand)
- Myoporum mauritianum A.DC. (Mauritius and Rodrigues)
- Myoporum montanum R.Br. – native myrtle (Australia)
- Myoporum niueanum H.St.John (Niue)
- Myoporum obscurum Endl. – bastard ironwood, popwood (Norfolk Island)
- Myoporum oppositifolium R.Br. – twin-leaf myoporum (Western Australia)
- Myoporum papuanum Kraenzl. (Lesser Sunda Islands, Maluku, New Guinea)
- Myoporum parvifolium R.Br. – creeping boobialla (Australia)
- Myoporum petiolatum R.J.Chinnock – sticky boobialla (Australia: South Australia, Victoria)
- Myoporum platycarpum R.Br. – sugarwood (Australia)
- Myoporum rapense F.Br. (French Polynesia)
- Myoporum rimatarense F.Br. (French Polynesia)
- Myoporum rotundatum S.Moore (New Caledonia)
- Myoporum sandwicense A.Gray – naio (Hawaii, Mangaia)
- Myoporum semotum Heenan & de Lange (New Zealand)
- Myoporum stellatum (G.L.Webster) O.Deg. & I.Deg. (Hawaii)
- Myoporum stokesii F.Br. (French Polynesia)
- Myoporum tenuifolium G.Forst. (New Caledonia and Loyalty Islands)
- Myoporum tetrandrum (Labill.) Domin boobialla (Australia)
- Myoporum tubiflorum Kraenzl. (New Zealand)
- Myoporum turbinatum R.J.Chinnock – salt myoporum (Western Australia)
- Myoporum velutinum R.J.Chinnock (Western Australia)
- Myoporum viscosum R.Br. – sticky boobialla (South Australia)
- Myoporum wilderi Skottsb. (Cook Islands)

=== Formerly placed here ===
- Eremophila debilis (Andrews) Chinnock (as M. debile (Andrews) R.Br.)
- Eremophila deserti (A.Cunn. ex Benth.) Chinnock (as M. deserti A.Cunn. ex Benth.)
