= List of Allophylus species =

Allophylus is a genus of plants in the family Sapindaceae. As of October 2024, Plants of the World Online accepted 211 species.

== A ==
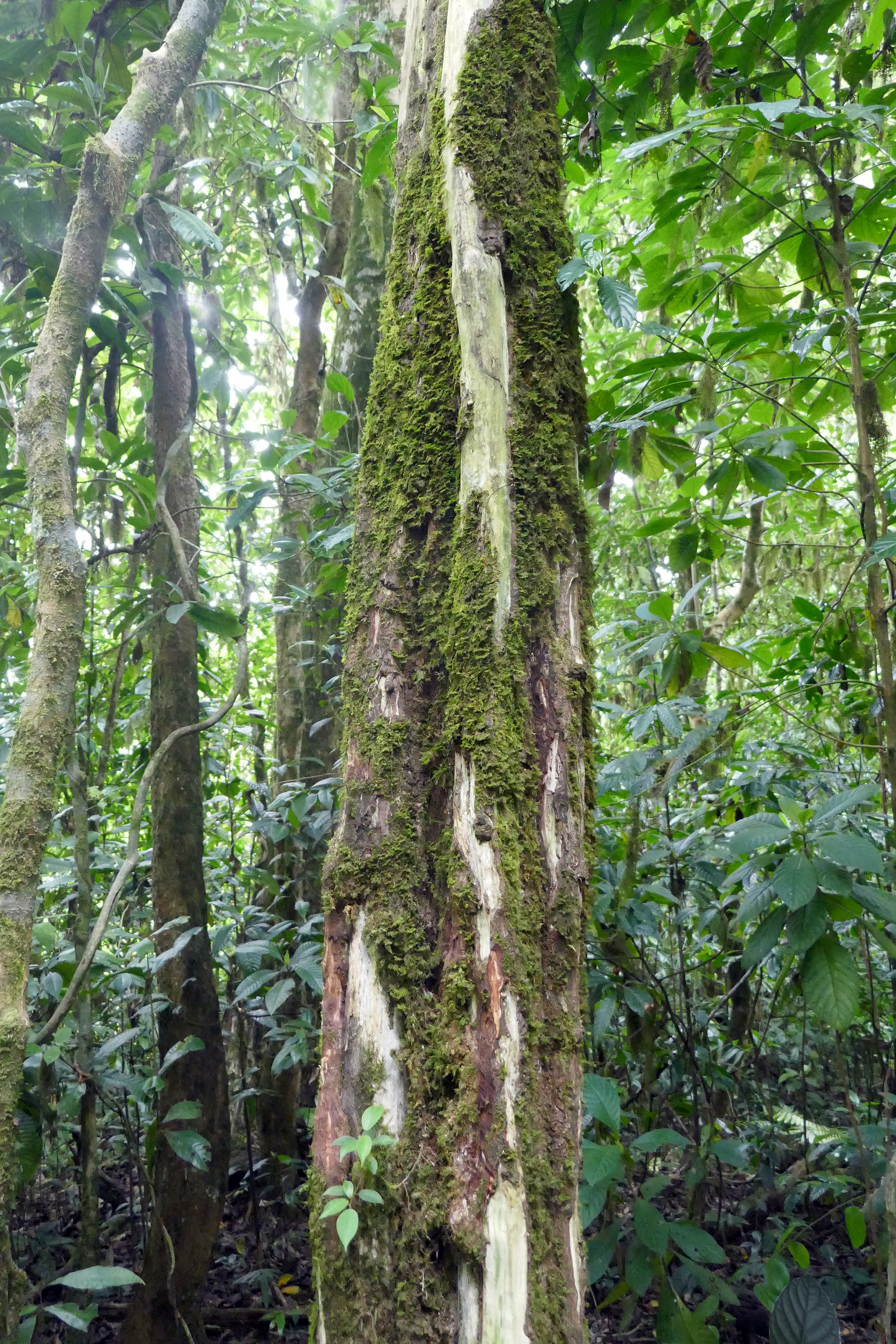
Allophylus africanus

- Allophylus abyssinicus (Hochst.) Radlk.
- Allophylus acutatus Radlk.
- Allophylus africanus P.Beauv.
- Allophylus agbala Hauman
- Allophylus aldabricus Radlk.
- Allophylusaltescandens Hauman
- Allophylus amazonicus (Mart.) Radlk.
- Allophylus amboinensis Blume
- Allophylus amentaceus Radlk.
- Allophylus amplissimus Hauman
- Allophylus angustatus (Triana & Planch.) Radlk.
- Allophylus antunesii Gilg
- Allophylus apiocarpus Radlk.
- Allophylus arboreus Choux

== B ==
- Allophylus bartlettii Merr.
- Allophylus bertoua Cheek
- Allophylus betongensis Craib
- Allophylus bicruris Radlk.
- Allophylus boinensis Choux
- Allophylus bojerianus (Cambess.) Blume
- Allophylus bongolavensis Choux
- Allophylus borbonicus (J.F.Gmel.) F.Friedmann
- Allophylus brachypetalus Gagnep.
- Allophylus brachystachys Radlk.
- Allophylus brevipes Radlk.
- Allophylus brevipetiolaris Radlk.
- Allophylus bullatus Radlk.

== C ==
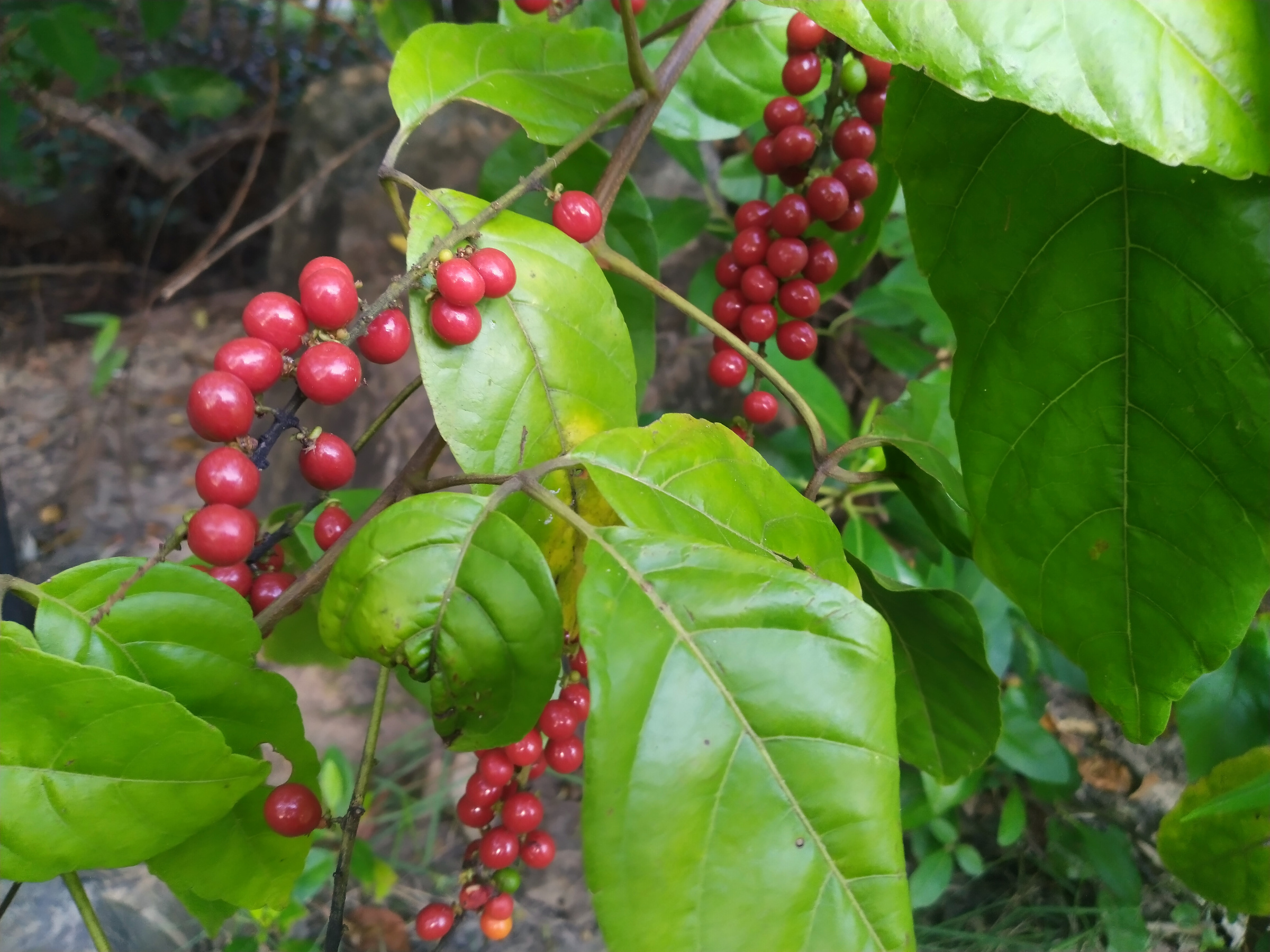
Allophylus cobbe

- Allophylus camptoneurus Radlk.
- Allophylus camptostachys Radlk.
- Allophylus capillipes Gagnep.
- Allophylus caudatus Radlk.
- Allophylus cazengoensis Baker f.
- Allophylus chartaceus (Kurz) Radlk.
- Allophylus chaunostachys Gilg
- Allophylus chirindensis Baker f.
- Allophylus chlorocarpus Radlk.
- Allophylus chrysoneurus Radlk.
- Allophylus chrysothrix (Radlk.) Lisowski
- Allophylus cinnamomeus Radlk.
- Allophylus cobbe (L.) Forsyth f.
- Allophylus cochinchinensis Lecomte
- Allophylus cominia (L.) Sw.
- Allophylus commersonii Blume
- Allophylus concanicus Radlk.
- Allophylus congolanus Gilg
- Allophylus conraui Gilg ex Radlk.
- Allophylus coriaceus Radlk.
- Allophylus costatus Choux
- Allophylus crassinervis Radlk.
- Allophylus crenatus Radlk.
- Allophylus cristalensis Lippold

== D ==
- Allophylus dasythyrsus Radlk.
- Allophylus decaryi Danguy & Choux
- Allophylus decipiens Radlk.
- Allophylus delicatulus Verdc.
- Allophylus densiflorus Radlk.
- Allophylus dimorphus Radlk.
- Allophylus dioicus (Nees & Mart.) Radlk.
- Allophylus divaricatus Radlk.
- Allophylus dodsonii Gentry
- Allophylus domingensis Alain
- Allophylus dregeanus (Sond.) De Winter
- Allophylus dummeri Baker f.

== E ==
- Allophylus edulis (A.St.-Hil., A.Juss. & Cambess.) Radlk.
- Allophylus elongatus Radlk.
- Allophylus eustachys Radlk.
- Allophylus exappendiculatus Somner, Ferrucci & Frazão
- Allophylus excelsus (Triana & Planch.) Radlk.

== F ==
- Allophylus ferrugineus Taub.
- Allophylus floribundus (Poepp.) Radlk.
- Allophylus fulvotomentosus Gilg
- Allophylus fuscus Radlk.

== G ==
- Allophylus gentryi Croat
- Allophylus glabratus (Kunth) Radlk.
- Allophylus gossweileri Baker f.
- Allophylus goudotii (Triana & Planch.) Radlk.
- Allophylus grandiflorus Radlk.
- Allophylus grandifolius (Baker) Radlk.
- Allophylus granulatus Radlk.
- Allophylus grossedentatus (Turcz.) Fern.-Vill.
- Allophylus grotei F.G.Davies & Verdc.
- Allophylus guaraniticus (A.St.-Hil.) Radlk.

== H ==
- Allophylus haitiensis Radlk. & Ekman
- Allophylus hallaei Fouilloy
- Allophylus hamatus Verm. ex Hauman
- Allophylus hayatae Gagnep.
- Allophylus heterophyllus (Cambess.) Radlk.
- Allophylus hirsutus Radlk.
- Allophylus hirtellus (Hook.f.) Radlk.
- Allophylus holophyllus Radlk.
- Allophylus hylophilus Gilg
- Allophylus hymenocalyx Radlk.

== I ==
- Allophylus imenoensis Pellegr.
- Allophylus incanus Radlk.
- Allophylus insignis Radlk.

== J ==
- Allophylus jamaicensis Radlk.
- Allophylus javensis Blume
- Allophylus jejunus Standl. ex Lundell

== K ==
- Allophylus katangensis Hauman

== L ==
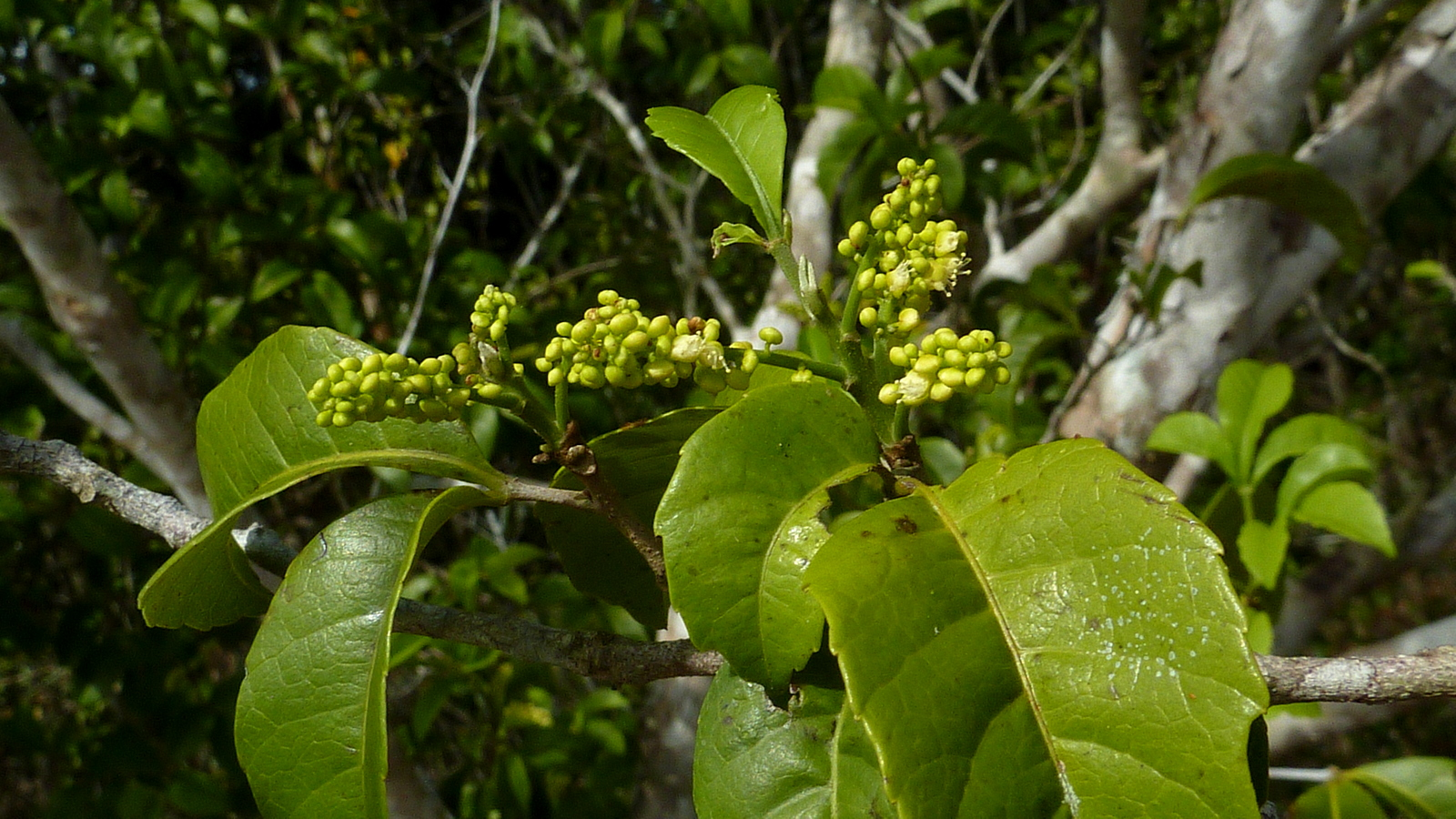
Allophylus laevigatus

- Allophylus laetevirens Ridl.
- Allophylus laetus Radlk.
- Allophylus laevigatus (Turcz.) Radlk.
- Allophylus largifolius Radlk.
- Allophylus lasiopus Baker f.
- Allophylus lastoursvillensis Pellegr.
- Allophylus latifolius Huber
- Allophylus laxiflorus Gagnep.
- Allophylus leptocladus Radlk.
- Allophylus leptococcus Radlk.
- Allophylus leptostachys Radlk.
- Allophylus letestui Pellegr.
- Allophylus leucochrous Radlk.
- Allophylus leucoclados Radlk.
- Allophylus leucophloeus Radlk.
- Allophylus livescens Gagnep.
- Allophylus longicuneatus Verm. ex Hauman
- Allophylus longifolius Radlk.
- Allophylus longipes Radlk.
- Allophylus longipetiolatus Gilg
- Allophylus lopezii Merr.
- Allophylus loretensis Standl. ex J.F.Macbr.

== M ==
- Allophylus macrocarpus Danguy & Choux
- Allophylus macrodontus Merr.
- Allophylus macrostachys Radlk.
- Allophylus maestrensis Lippold
- Allophylus malvaceus Radlk.
- Allophylus mananarensis Choux
- Allophylus mayimbensis Pellegr.
- Allophylus megaphyllus Hutch. & Dalziel
- Allophylus melliodorus Gilg ex Radlk.
- Allophylus micrococcus Radlk.
- Allophylus mollis (Kunth) Radlk.
- Allophylus montanus F.N.Williams
- Allophylus mossambicensis Exell
- Allophylus multicostatus A.H.Gentry
- Allophylus myrianthus Radlk.

== N ==
- Allophylus natalensis (Sond.) De Winter
- Allophylus ngounyensis Pellegr.
- Allophylus nigericus Baker f.
- Allophylus nigrescens Blume
- Allophylus nitidulus (Triana & Planch.) Radlk.

== O ==
- Allophylus obliquus Radlk.
- Allophylus oyemensis Pellegr.

== P ==
- Allophylus pachyphyllus Radlk.
- Allophylus pallidus Radlk.
- Allophylus paniculatus (Poepp.) Radlk.
- Allophylus parimensis Steyerm.
- Allophylus pauciflorus Radlk.
- Allophylus peduncularis Radlk.
- Allophylus persicifolius Hauman
- Allophylus peruvianus Radlk.
- Allophylus pervillei Blume
- Allophylus petelotii Merr.
- Allophylus petiolulatus Radlk.
- Allophylus pilosus (J.F.Macbr.) A.H.Gentry
- Allophylus poungouensis Pellegr.
- Allophylus pseudopaniculatus Baker f.
- Allophylus psilospermus Radlk.
- Allophylus puberulus (Cambess.) Radlk.
- Allophylus punctatus (Poepp.) Radlk.

== Q ==
- Allophylus quercifolius (Mart.) Radlk.
- Allophylus quinatus Radlk.

== R ==
- Allophylus racemosus Sw.
- Allophylus rapensis F.Br.
- Allophylus repandifolius Merr. & Chun
- Allophylus repandodentatus Radlk.
- Allophylus reticulatus Radlk.
- Allophylus rheedei (Wight) Radlk.
- Allophylus rhodesicus Exell
- Allophylus rhomboidalis (Nadeaud) Radlk.
- Allophylus rigidus (Sw.) Sw.
- Allophylus robustus Radlk.
- Allophylus rubifolius (Hochst. ex A.Rich.) Engl.
- Allophylus rutete Gilg

== S ==
- Allophylus salignus Blume
- Allophylus salinarius Gagnep.
- Allophylus samarensis Merr.
- Allophylus samoritourei Cheek
- Allophylus sapinii Verm. ex Hauman
- Allophylus scandens Ridl.
- Allophylus scrobiculatus (Poepp.) Radlk.
- Allophylus sechellensis Summerh.
- Allophylus semidentatus (Miq.) Radlk.
- Allophylus serratus (Roxb.) Kurz
- Allophylus setulosus Radlk.
- Allophylus simplicifolius Radlk.
- Allophylus sootepensis Craib
- Allophylus spectabilis Gilg
- Allophylus spicatus (Poir.) Radlk.
- Allophylus stenodictyus Radlk.
- Allophylus stenophyllus Merr.
- Allophylus strictus Radlk.
- Allophylus subfalcatus Radlk.
- Allophylus subincisodentatus Radlk.
- Allophylus sumatranus Blume

== T ==
- Allophylus talbotii Baker f.
- Allophylus tanzaniensis F.G.Davies
- Allophylus timoriensis (DC.) Blume
- Allophylus torrei Exell & Mendonça
- Allophylus trichodesmus Radlk.
- Allophylus trichophyllus Merr. & Chun
- Allophylus triphyllus (Burm.f.) Merr.

== U ==
- Allophylus ujori Cheek
- Allophylus umbrinus A.C.Sm.
- Allophylus unifoliatus Radlk.
- Allophylus unifoliolatus Radlk.

== V ==
- Allophylus vestitus F.G.Davies
- Allophylus villosus (Roxb.) Blume
- Allophylus viridis Radlk.

== W ==
- Allophylus whitei Exell

== Z ==
- Allophylus zenkeri Gilg ex Radlk.
- Allophylus zeylanicus L.
