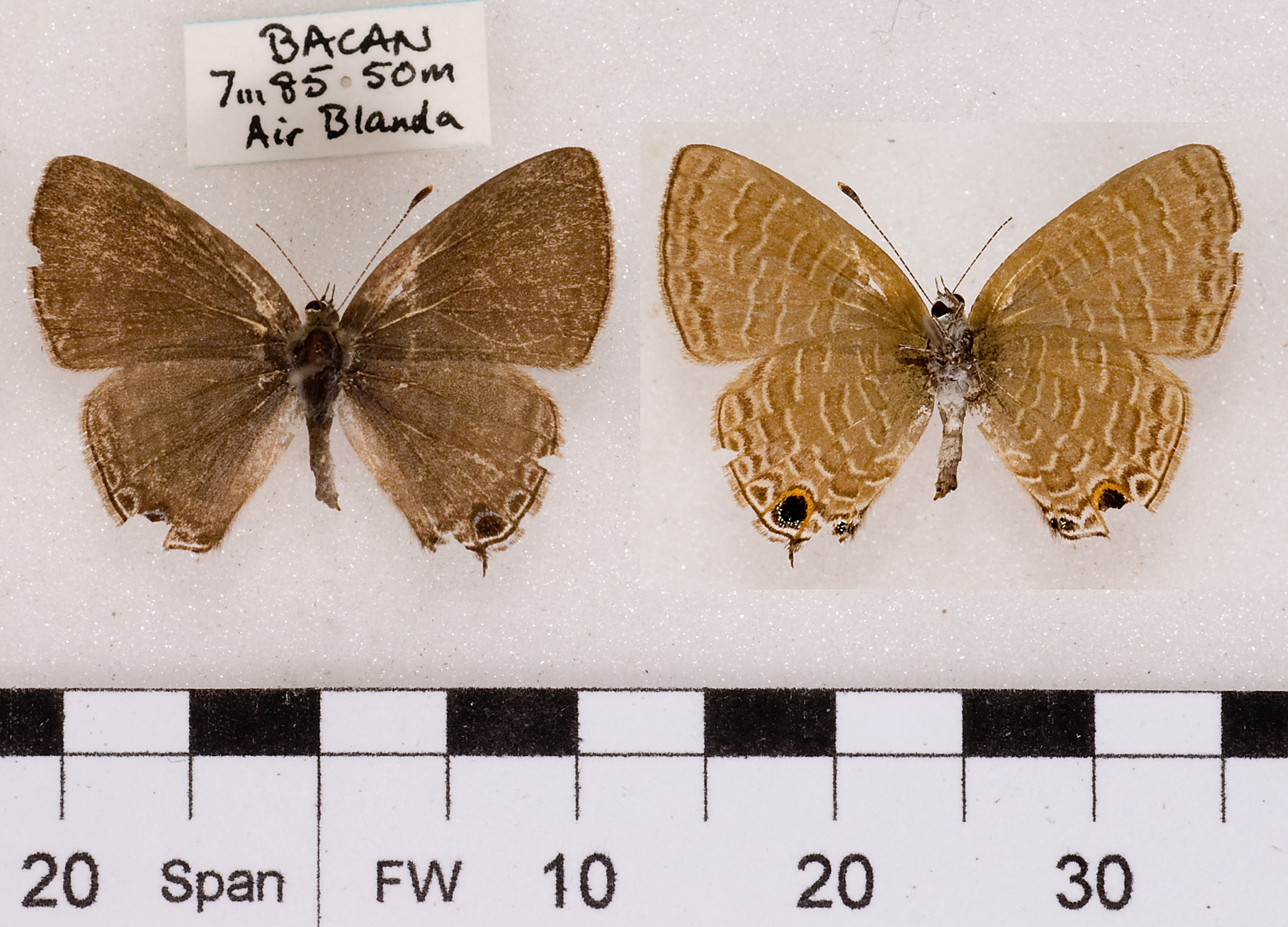

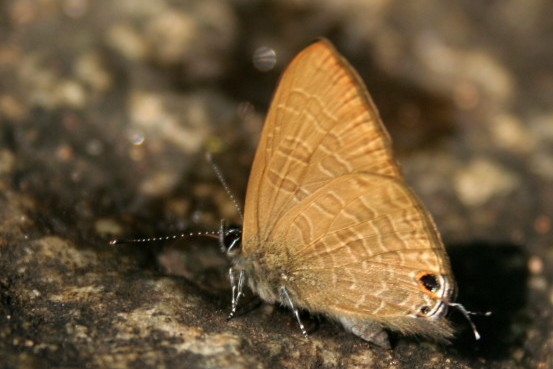

Scientific classification
- Domain: Eukaryota
- Kingdom: Animalia
- Phylum: Arthropoda
- Class: Insecta
- Order: Lepidoptera
- Family: Lycaenidae
- Genus: Ionolyce
- Species: I. helicon

Binomial name
- Ionolyce helicon (Felder, 1860)

Synonyms
- Nacaduba helicon (Felder, 1860); Lycaena helicon Felder, 1860; Plebeius unicolor Röber, 1886

= Ionolyce helicon =

Species of insect

Ionolyce helicon, the pointed lineblue, or bronze lineblue, is a small butterfly found in the Indomalayan realm that belongs to the lycaenids or blues family.

== Description ==
Dorsal surface of male dark purple and without markings. Whereas in female, dorsum brownish with a bluish-purple tinge at the wing bases. Ventral surface of both wings with dull greyish-brown and white striae. Eye spot at tornus tipped with orange ring. There is a fine white-tipped tail. Caterpillar greenish with pale green markings. Host plants are Allophylus cobbe and Entada phaseoloides. Pupa mottled brown with dark markings.

== Subspecies ==
There are eight subspecies including nominate race.

- Ionolyce helicon brunnea (Evans, 1932) - Andaman & Nicobar Is. (Andamans).
- Ionolyce helicon caracalla (Waterhouse & Lyell, 1914) - Waigeu, Misool, West Irian - Papua, Darnley I., New Britain, New Ireland
- Ionolyce helicon helicon Felder, 1860
- Ionolyce helicon hyllus (Waterhouse & Lyell, 1914) -Australia (Cape York - Cooktown)
- Ionolyce helicon javanica Toxopeus, 1929 - Java
- Ionolyce helicon kondulana (Evans, 1932) - Andaman & Nicobar Is. (South Nicobars).
- Ionolyce helicon merguiana Moore, 1884 - Sikkim to N.E. India, S.Burma, Thailand - Singapore, Sumatra, ?Borneo, S.Yunnan
- Ionolyce helicon viola (Moore, 1877) - Sri Lanka, south India

Male. Forewing triangular, costa long, quite a fifth longer than the hinder margin, apex produced and somewhat acute; outer margin nearly straight. Hindwing with the apex well defined, outer margin nearly straight to vein 3, the anal angle rounded. Upperside dark brownish lilac-purple, terminal line on both wings black. Hindwing with a sub-terminal series of indistinct blackish spots, the spot in interspace 2 large and more distinct and edged outwardly by a pale line; tail black, tipped with white. Cilia grey, darker inwardly. Underside brownish-grey, with a slight pinkish tinge, bands not darker than the ground colour, indicated by their white edgings. Forewing with a bar across the middle of the cell, extends hindwards to vein 1, a bar across the end of the cell, a discal band of four conjoined bars from near the costa to vein 8, extended hindwards from its inner side to vein 1; the bar above vein 3 a little disjointed inwards. Hindwing with a sub-basal band, a bar across the end of the cell, and a discal outwardly curved band of bars, the fifth from the costa a little inwards, touching the lower end of the discoidal bar; both wings with terminal brown line, and a double series of sub-terminal white lunules filled in with pale brown, a large sub-terminal black spot in interspace 2, with some metallic blue-green scales and capped with pale orange. Antennae black, ringed with white; head and body brown, the palpi fringed with black hairs. Female. Upperside. Forewing dull greyish-blue, costal and outer marginal borders broadly black, broadest at the apex, gradually narrowing on the costa towards the base. Hindwing darker greyish-blue, veins prominent, a sub-terminal series of black angular spots, small and geminate in interspace 1, large in interspace 2, decreasing in size upwards, all capped with pale lunules and outwardly edged with white, terminal line on both wings black; indications of a series of sub-terminal, blackish, angular spots on the forewing. Forewings with the outer margin slightly convex; the apex less produced. Hindwing with the outer margin rounded. Underside as in the male.

— Charles Swinhoe, Lepidoptera Indica. Vol. VIII
