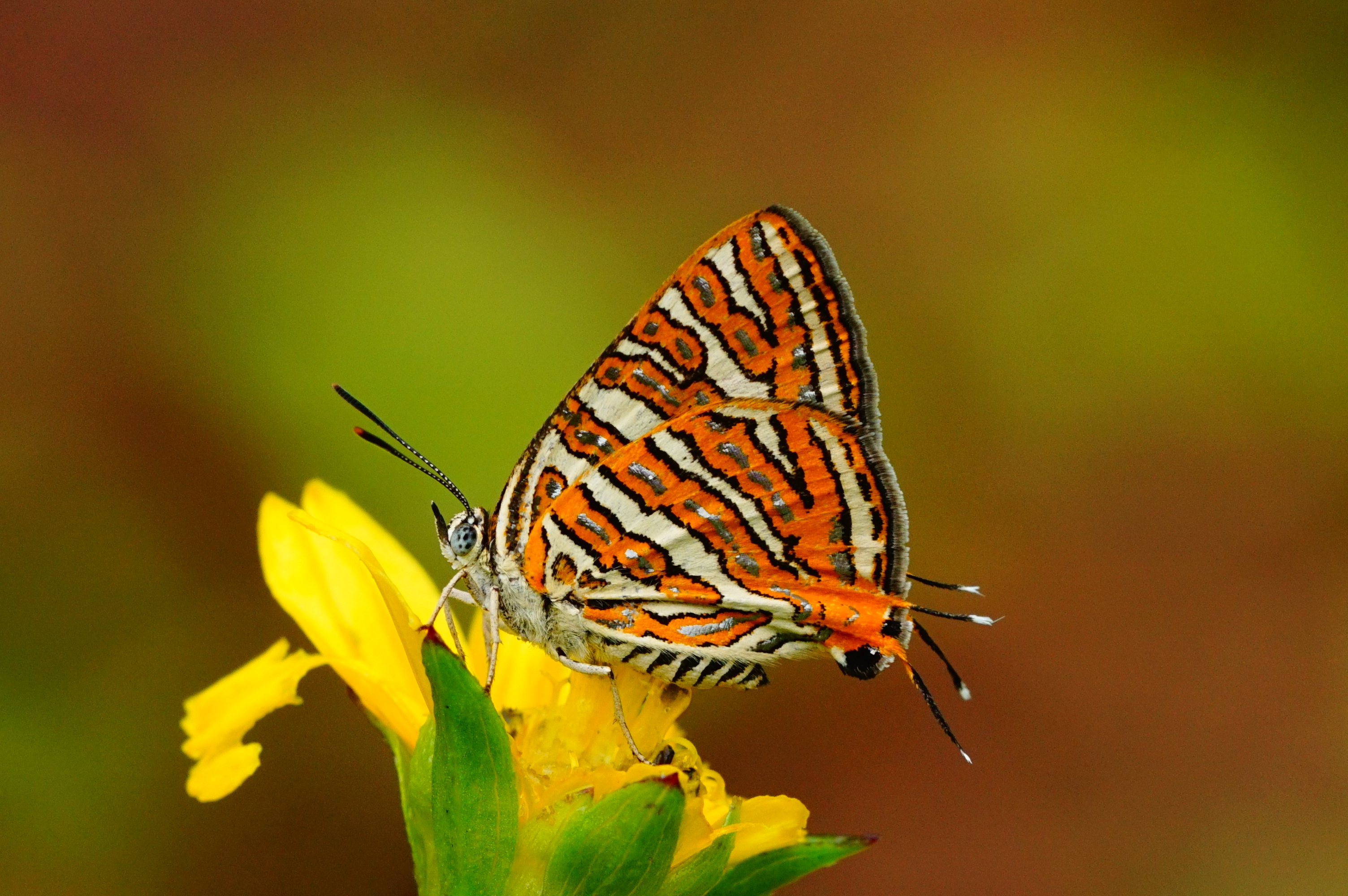

Scientific classification
- Kingdom: Animalia
- Phylum: Arthropoda
- Clade: Pancrustacea
- Class: Insecta
- Order: Lepidoptera
- Family: Lycaenidae
- Genus: Cigaritis
- Species: C. vulcanus

Binomial name
- Cigaritis vulcanus (Fabricius, 1775)

Synonyms
- Spindasis vulcanus

= Cigaritis vulcanus =

Common silverline

Species of butterfly

Cigaritis vulcanus, the common silverline, is a species of lycaenid or blue butterfly found in Asia. It was first described by Johan Christian Fabricius in 1775.

== Description ==
Male. Upperside dark brown, with a more or less violet tinge. Forewing usually with three short orange-red transverse bands in the upper part of the wing, these bands are of various lengths in different specimens, and all descend from near the costa downwards, the sub-apical band the shortest, the discal band the longest, in some examples there is an orange- red sub-basal mark, and another on the costa at its middle, and there is also an indication of a sub-marginal band. Hindwing with an anal orange-red patch, which in most examples narrows upwards for a short distance sub-marginally, a small black spot in the anal lobe, another on the margin between the two tails, both with some silvery-blue scales attached to them; tails black, with minute white tips, the orange-red colour of the anal patch running half way up both of them; both wings with black outer marginal line and whitish cilia with a black base. Underside pale whitish-sulphury-yellow, bands red-brown edged with dark In-own, with inner silvery macular lining. Forewing with a thin sub-costal basal streak, a short, club-shaped medial basal streak, a broad band from the costal fourth to vein 2 with a dark brown mark below it which extends inwards to the base, a medial band forked upwards above its middle, is outwardly oblique and touches the sub-marginal band, a little above the sub-median vein, a short sub-apical band composed of two conjoined oval spots, from the costa to the middle of the interspace below vein 4, where it touches the sub-marginal band; all these bands have irregular edges; the sub-marginal baud. which is narrower than the others, is nearly straight and ends in a diffuse brownish space at the hinder angle, a slightly narrower marginal band, without the inner silvery lining. Hindwing with five transverse bands from the costa all ending in the diffuse greyish anal patch; the first basal, commencing in al macular form, and then curved outwards close to the abdominal margin, the next three straight down from the costa, sub-basal, medial and discal, the sub-basal band ending in a slightly outwardly curved point which nearly touches the middle band, the discal band joins the curved fifth band at vein 2, this band runs from the apex of the wing in a somewhat recurved form and nearly joins the termination of the middle band; in some examples the anal patch is somewhat rufous, in others it is rufous-grey; the anal lobe has a large black spot and there is a somewhat smaller spot on the margin between the two tails, and there is a sub-marginal row of four black lunules from the outer tail upwards, and a short streak with silvery specks in it, above the anal lobe along and near to the abdominal margin. Antennae black, with white segmental dots, club with a red tip; frons white, with a black middle stripe; head and body above and below concolorous with the wings. Female. Upperside of a duller and paler brown colour. Forewing with all the orange-red bands broader and more extended hindwards, with an additional orange-red macular band close to the outer margin which varies in extent and distinctness in different examples. Hindwing with bands of the underside often more or less visible through the wing, the anal orange-red patch extended on each side forming a band attenuated upwards close to the outer margin and usually ends a little above the middle. Underside as in the male, but the bands are broader and usually more red.

— Charles Swinhoe, Lepidoptera Indica. Vol. IX

The wingspan is 26–34 mm.

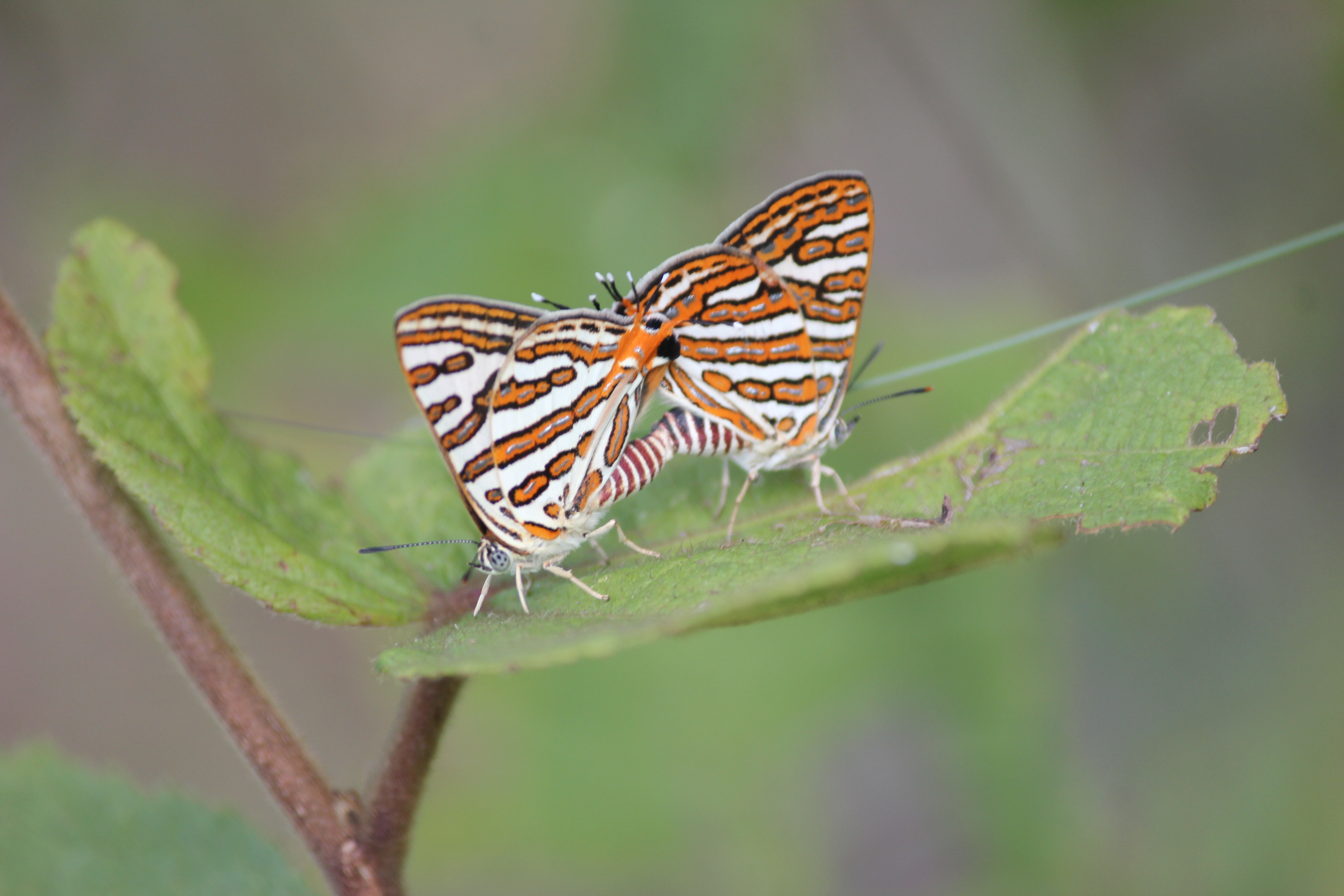
Mating pair

== Subspecies ==
The subspecies of Cigaritis vulcanus are-

- Spindasis vulcanus vulcanus Fabricius, 1775 – India
- Spindasis vulcanus fusca (Moore, [1881]) – Sri Lanka
- Spindasis vulcanus javanus (Fruhstorfer, 1912) – Java
- Spindasis vulcanus tavoyana (Evans, [1925]) – Myanmar, Thailand

== Distribution ==
These butterflies are found in Sri Lanka, India, central Thailand, Vietnam and Java. In India, the species has been spotted in the territories of Maharashtra, Orissa, Karnataka, Kerala, Andhra Pradesh, West Bengal, Delhi, Madhya Pradesh, Uttar Pradesh and Tamil Nadu. And in Vietnam, this species has only been recorded in Bình Phước province (Monastyrskii, 2003).

== Habitat ==
Their numbers peak during the south-west and north-east monsoons. It inhabits scrub land with sparse vegetation, hedge rows, scrub jungles and secondary forest.

== Habits ==
They are difficult to disturb when nectaring on flowers but are able to fly fast erratically. Even when disturbed they return to the same spot a moment later. Mainly, they are found near their host plants.

== Food plants ==
The larvae feed on jujube, Zizyphus rugosa, Ixora longifolia, Clerodendrum siphomanthus, C. inerme, Allophylus cobbe, Ixora chinensis and Canthium parviflorum.
