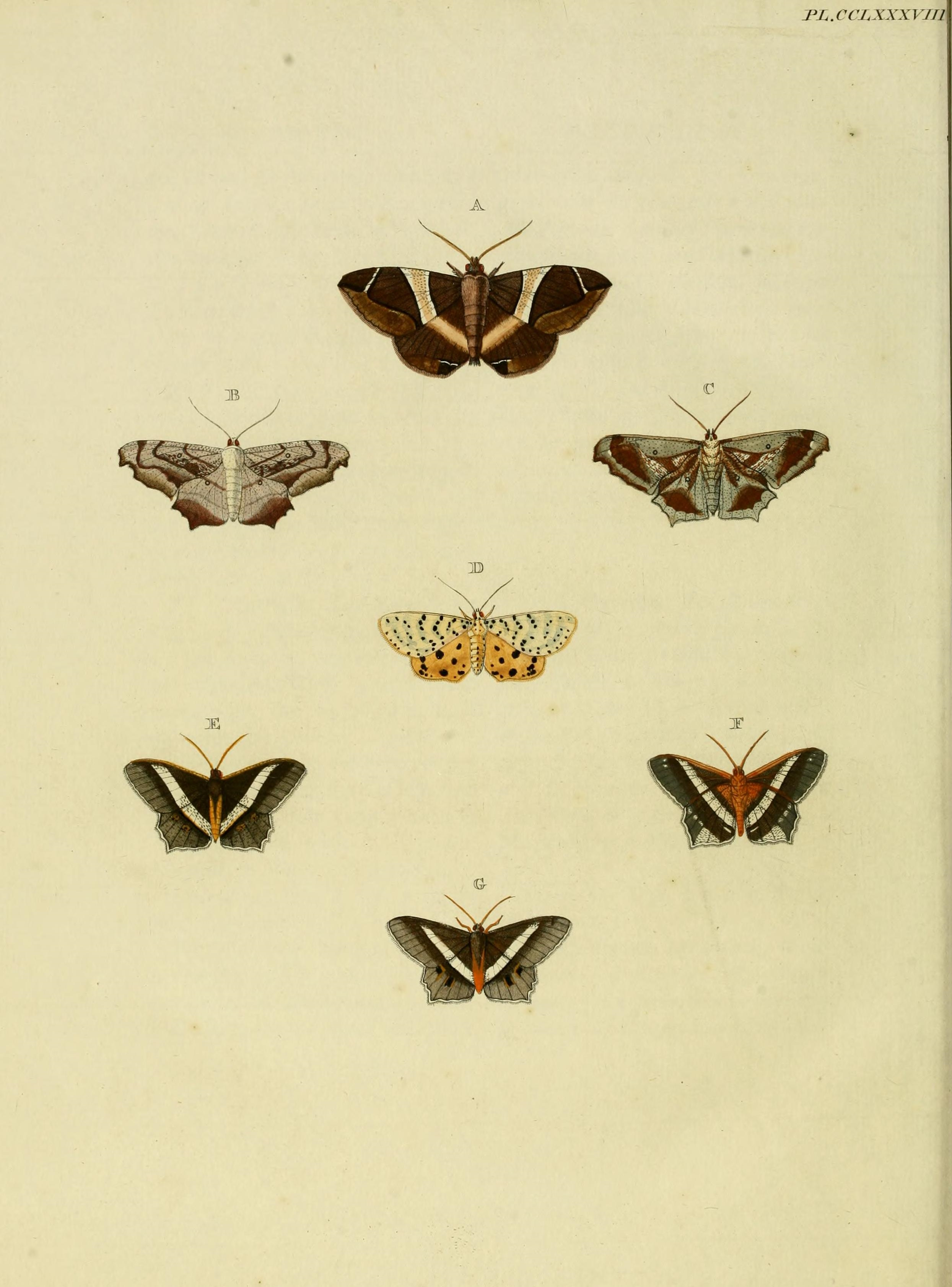
- Moth B

Scientific classification
- Kingdom: Animalia
- Phylum: Arthropoda
- Clade: Pancrustacea
- Class: Insecta
- Order: Lepidoptera
- Family: Geometridae
- Genus: Gonodontis
- Species: G. clelia

Binomial name
- Gonodontis clelia (Cramer, 1780)

Synonyms
- Phalaena clelia Cramer, 1780; Orsonoba rajaca Walker, 1860

= Gonodontis clelia =

Species of moth

Gonodontis clelia is a moth in the family Geometridae first described by Pieter Cramer in 1780. It is found in Sri Lanka, South India, Pakistan, Nepal, Hong Kong, the Andaman Islands, Singapore, Borneo and Australia.

== Description ==
The wingspan of the male is 42 mm. Male has uniform reddish tint wings. Female is similar but with much darker reddish. Antemedial line highly angled below costa. A dark speck at end of cell. A rufous spot found on costa before apex. Hindwings are with a dark spot.

The caterpillar is cylindrical and slender. Body ochreous brown with large dark brown, saddle-like patch. Setae are set on chalazae. Colour of setae and chalazae white in first instars and later turn black. the caterpillar rests on a plant stem, petiole or leaf surface with a 45 degree inclination. Pupation occurs in a cocoon made by substrate particles. Host plants include Allophylus cobbe, Mangifera indica, Tectona grandis, Gmelina arborea, Eugenia, Olea dioica, Ricinus communis, mangrove species like Sonneratia alba, Aegiceras, Avicennia, Allophylus and Excoecaria species.
