= Corethrovalva paraplesia =

Scientific classification
- Kingdom: Animalia
- Phylum: Arthropoda
- Class: Insecta
- Order: Lepidoptera
- Family: Gracillariidae
- Genus: Corethrovalva
- Species: C. paraplesia

Binomial name
- Corethrovalva paraplesia Vári, 1961

Species of moth

Corethrovalva paraplesia is a moth of the family Gracillariidae. It is known from South Africa.

The larvae feed on Rhus species. They probably mine the leaves of their host plant.
