= Allophylus rubifolius var. rhusiphyllus =

Conservation status
- Near Threatened (IUCN 2.3)

Scientific classification
- Kingdom: Plantae
- Clade: Tracheophytes
- Clade: Angiosperms
- Clade: Eudicots
- Clade: Rosids
- Order: Sapindales
- Family: Sapindaceae
- Genus: Allophylus
- Species: A. rubifolius
- Variety: A. r. var. rhusiphyllus

Trinomial name
- Allophylus rubifolius var. rhusiphyllus (Balf.f.) Friis & Vollesen (1996)

Synonyms
- Allophylus rhoidiphyllus Balf.f. (1888), nom. illeg.; Allophylus rhusiphyllus Balf.f. (1882)

Variety of flowering plant

Allophylus rubifolius var. rhusiphyllus is a variety of flowering plant in the family Sapindaceae. It is a shrub or tree native to northeastern Somalia and the Socotra Archipelago of Yemen. In the Socotra Archipelago it is a fairly common tree in submontane woodland.
