= Gonodontis =

Scientific classification
- Kingdom: Animalia
- Phylum: Arthropoda
- Clade: Pancrustacea
- Class: Insecta
- Order: Lepidoptera
- Family: Geometridae
- Subfamily: Ennominae
- Tribe: Gonodontini
- Genus: Gonodontis; Hübner, [1823]

Genus of moths

Gonodontis is a genus of moths in the family Geometridae.

Species:

- Gonodontis aethocrypta Prout, 1926
- Gonodontis angulata Yazaki, 2012
- Gonodontis clelia (Cramer, [1780])
- Gonodontis euctista (Turner, 1947)
- Gonodontis fenestrata (Lucas, 1900)
- Gonodontis ivani Expósito, 2019
- Gonodontis luteola (Turner, 1904)
- Gonodontis orthotoma (Lower, 1894)
- Gonodontis pallida (Butler, 1880)
- Gonodontis planaria Yazaki, 2012
- Gonodontis stramenticea (Turner, 1947)
