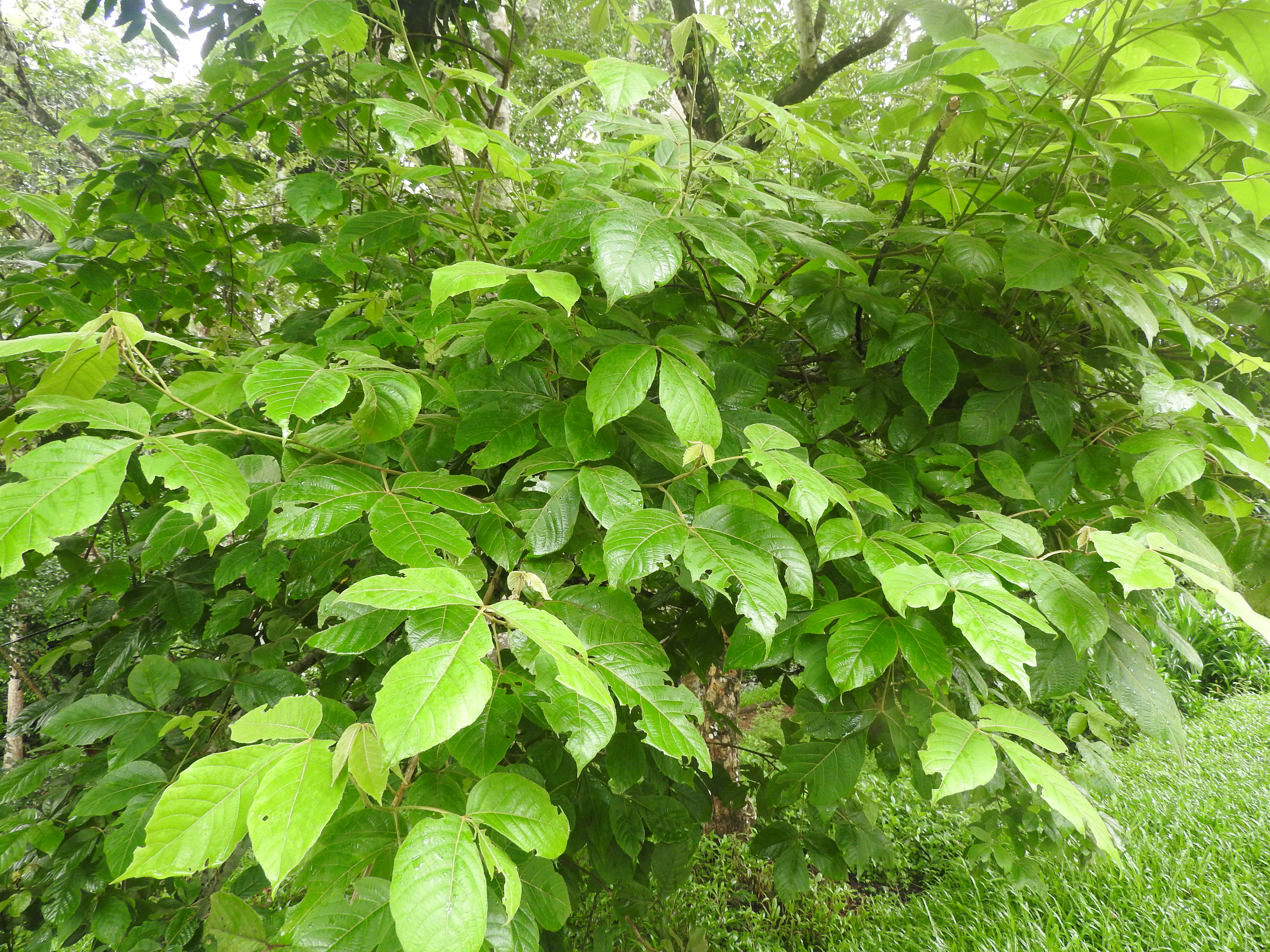

Scientific classification
- Kingdom: Plantae
- Clade: Tracheophytes
- Clade: Angiosperms
- Clade: Eudicots
- Clade: Rosids
- Order: Sapindales
- Family: Sapindaceae
- Genus: Allophylus
- Species: A. concanicus

Binomial name
- Allophylus concanicus Radlk.

= Allophylus concanicus =

Species of flowering plant

Allophylus concanicus is an endemic, critically endangered climbing shrub of the Sapindaceae family found in India's Western Ghats. It is characterized by trifoliate leaves with hairy midribs and small, whitish, hairy flowers that appear from December to April. The species is found in tropical evergreen and shola forests across multiple states, including Karnataka, Kerala, and Tamil Nadu.
