= Viridiflorol =

Names
- IUPAC name 6β,11-Cyclo-1β,4α,5β,10α-guaian-10-ol
- Systematic IUPAC name (1aR,4S,4aS,7R,7aS,7bS)-1,1,4,7-Tetramethyldecahydro-1H-cyclopropa[e]azulen-4-ol
- Other names (+)-Viridiflorol

Identifiers
CAS Number	552-02-3
3D model (JSmol)	Interactive image
ChEBI	CHEBI:156228
ChEMBL	ChEMBL3120647
ChemSpider	91904
ECHA InfoCard	100.008.186
EC Number	209-003-3
PubChem CID	11996452
UNII	HN71V2CRMY
CompTox Dashboard (EPA)	DTXSID80881213
- InChI: InChI=1S/C15H26O/c1-9-5-6-10-12(9)13-11(14(13,2)3)7-8-15(10,4)16/h9-13,16H,5-8H2,1-4H3/t9-,10+,11-,12-,13-,15+/m1/s1 Key: AYXPYQRXGNDJFU-IMNVLQEYSA-N
- SMILES: C[C@@H]1CC[C@H]2[C@@H]1[C@H]3[C@H](C3(C)C)CC[C@]2(C)O

Properties
Chemical formula	C_{15}H_{26}O
Molar mass	222.372 g·mol^{−1}

Hazards
- GHS labelling
Pictograms	(GHS07: Exclamation mark)
Signal word	Warning
Hazard statements	H315, H319
Precautionary statements	P264, P280, P302+P352, P305+P351+P338, P321, P332+P313, P337+P313, P362
- Except where otherwise noted, data are given for materials in their standard state (at 25 °C [77 °F], 100 kPa). Infobox references

Viridiflorol is a chemical compound, classified as a sesquiterpenoid, that has been isolated from the essential oils of a variety of plants including Melaleuca quinquenervia (broad-leaved paperbark), Melaleuca alternifolia (tea tree), and Allophylus edulis.

Viridiflorol has shown moderate antibacterial activity against Mycobacterium tuberculosis, the causative agent of tuberculosis, in an in vitro assay. It is also produced by the endophytic root fungus Serendipita indica and exhibits antifungal activity against Colletotrichum truncatum
