= Corethrovalva goniosema =

Scientific classification
- Kingdom: Animalia
- Phylum: Arthropoda
- Class: Insecta
- Order: Lepidoptera
- Family: Gracillariidae
- Genus: Corethrovalva
- Species: C. goniosema

Binomial name
- Corethrovalva goniosema Vári, 1961

Species of moth

Corethrovalva goniosema is a moth of the family Gracillariidae. It is known from South Africa.

The larvae feed on Allophylus natalensis. They mine the leaves of their host plant.
