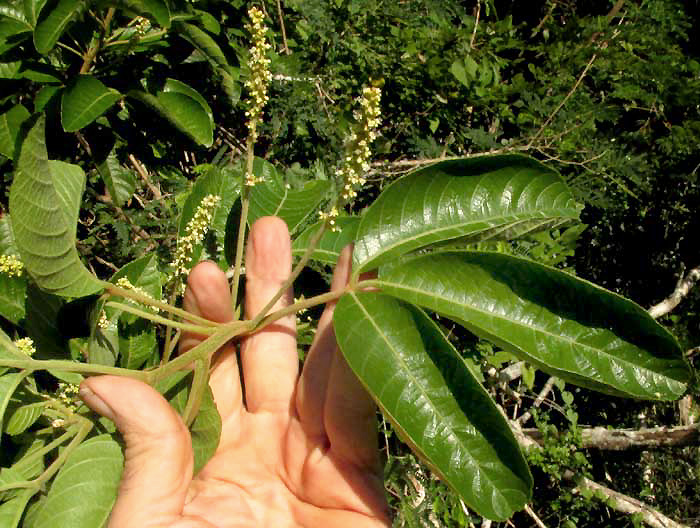
- Allophylus cominia leafy, flowering branch

Scientific classification
- Kingdom: Plantae
- Clade: Embryophytes
- Clade: Tracheophytes
- Clade: Spermatophytes
- Clade: Angiosperms
- Clade: Eudicots
- Clade: Rosids
- Order: Sapindales
- Family: Sapindaceae
- Genus: Allophylus
- Species: A. cominia

Binomial name
- Allophylus cominia (L.) Sw.

Synonyms
- Rhus cominia L.; Ornitrophe cominia (L.) Willd.; Schmidelia cominia (L.) Sw.

= Allophylus cominia =

Species of plant

Allophylus cominia, with no commonly used English name, is a species of shrub or tree native to tropical America. It belongs to the family Sapindaceae.

== Description ==
Allophylus cominia displays these noteworthy features:

- It can grow up to 9 m (30 ft) high, with trunks 20 cm (7.9 in) in diameter. Young branches are densely covered with hairlike hairlike trichomes.
- Leaves with long petioles bear blades once divided into 3 leaflets longer than wide up to about 15 cm (5.9 in) long, and somewhat blunt to a little pointed at the ends. Leaflet margins develop no conspicuous teeth or indentations, though they may have very small teeth; leaflet upper surfaces are dark green above with few hairlike trichomes except on the veins, while undersurfaces are densely hairy and paler.
- Inflorescences are panicles consisting of several raceme-type branches which usually are longer than the leaves. The branches are densely hairy.
- Flowers are creamy white, slightly fragrant, and about 1 mm (1/16 in) broad. There are 4 sepals, the two outer ones the smaller, 4 petals, with several stamens, some being longer than others.
- One-seeded, more or less spherical fruits up to about 6 mm (1/4 in) across are fleshy, though the flesh is very sparse; at maturity the fruits are red or orange, and may bear a few short hairlike trichomes.

== Distribution ==
Allophylus cominia is native to southern Mexico, the West Indies, and in Central America south to Costa Rica.

== Habitat ==
Allophylus cominia inhabits moist or wet thickets or forest.

== Ecology ==
In Haiti, Allophylus cominia serves as a crucial food source for wildlife, particularly birds. Birds spread the species as they disperse the seeds, facilitating new trees throughout the region.

== Human uses ==
=== In traditional medicine ===
In the area of Haiti's Grand Bois National Park, Allophylus cominia provides a remedy for stomach aches, colds, dysentery, tetanus and tuberculosis.

In Cuba, particularly in Afro-Cubans communities, Allophylus cominia is used for treating venereal diseases, colds, indigestion and stomach ache, as well as for veterinary uses. Also in Cuba, drinking a decoction of Allophylus cominia leaves for a period of time is seen as an effective control of blood sugar level for diabetics. However, tests on rats found that under specific laboratory conditions no effects on blood sugar were seen, but neither were there bad effects observed by using the decoction.

=== In voodoo ceremonies ===
In the area of Haiti's Grand Bois National Park, where Allophylus cominia is known as Twa fèy, the tree often is used in voodoo ceremonies, it is believed to possess mystical properties.

== Taxonomy ==
In 1759, Allophylus cominia was formally described by Carl Linnaeus under the name Rhus cominia. Attending Linnaeus's Latin description is the annotation "Sloan. jam. t. 108. f.1." This refers to a work by Hans Sloane (1660-1753) describing things of nature encountered during a trip to the West Indies. The "t. 108. f.1" accompanying Linnaeus's description means "tabula 108, figura 1," but the "t. 108" appears to be an error, for tabula 108 figura 1 shows Nepeta maima, a mint. However tabula 208, figura 1 portrays what looks like Allophylus cominia, labeled Baccifera Indica. Elsewhere in the book Baccifera Indica is described as having orange fruits with "... a thin Pulp, a single large Acinus or Stone... ," just like Allophylus cominia.

=== Varieties ===
Allophylus cominia includes three accepted varieties:

- Allophylus cominia var. cominia
- Allophylus cominia var. decalvatus Radlk.
- Allophylus cominia var. parvifolia Kitan.

=== Etymology ===
A good guess is that the genus name Allophylus is based on the Greek állos, meaning "other, another," and fýllo, meaning "leaf." So, "another leaf," perhaps referring to the 3-divided leaves of species in the genus. The species name cominia is taken from the genus Cominia P. Browne, that genus name now regarded as a synonym of Allophylus.

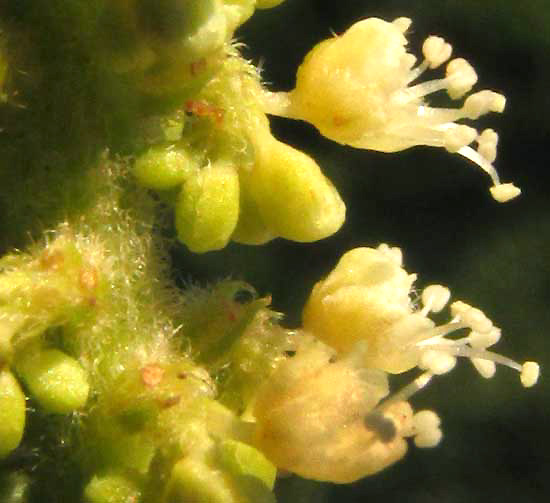
Allophylus cominia flowers

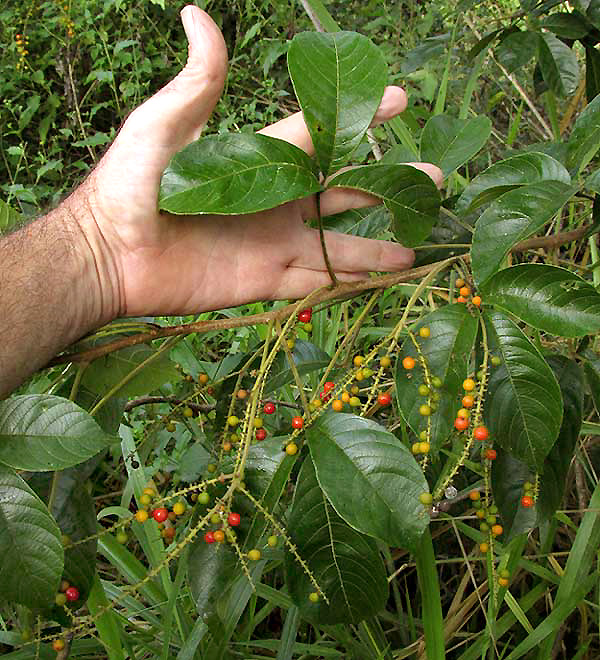
Allophylus cominia fruiting branch

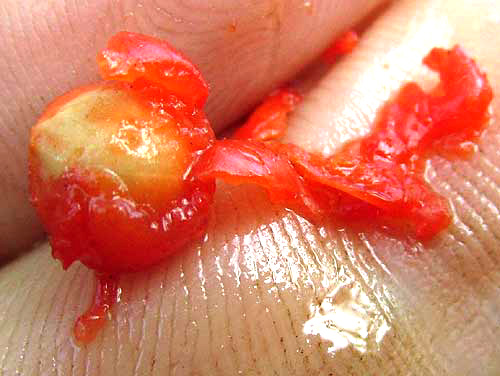
Allophylus cominia open fruit exposing seed

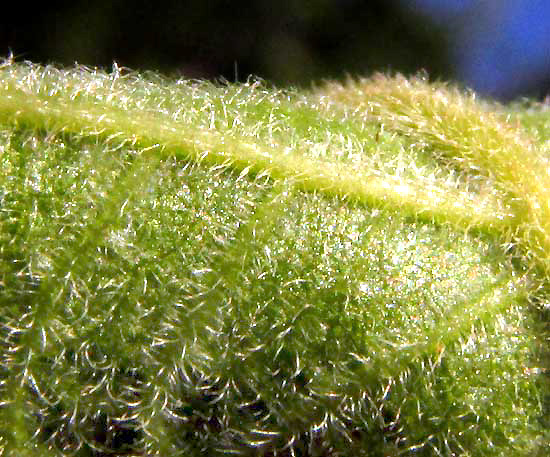
Allophylus cominia hairy leaflet undersurface
