= Corethrovalva allophylina =

Scientific classification
- Kingdom: Animalia
- Phylum: Arthropoda
- Class: Insecta
- Order: Lepidoptera
- Family: Gracillariidae
- Genus: Corethrovalva
- Species: C. allophylina

Binomial name
- Corethrovalva allophylina Vári, 1961

Species of moth

Corethrovalva allophylina is a moth of the family Gracillariidae. It is known from South Africa.

The larvae feed on Allophylus transvaalensis. They mine the leaves of their host plant.
