= Stigmella allophylica =

Scientific classification
- Kingdom: Animalia
- Phylum: Arthropoda
- Clade: Pancrustacea
- Class: Insecta
- Order: Lepidoptera
- Family: Nepticulidae
- Genus: Stigmella
- Species: S. allophylica

Binomial name
- Stigmella allophylica Scoble, 1978

Species of moth

Stigmella allophylica is a moth of the family Nepticulidae. It was described by Scoble in 1978. It is found in South Africa (it was described from the Umhlanga Rocks in Natal).

The larvae feed on Allophylus natalensis. They probably mine the leaves of their host.
