= Corethrovalva =

Scientific classification
- Kingdom: Animalia
- Phylum: Arthropoda
- Class: Insecta
- Order: Lepidoptera
- Family: Gracillariidae
- Subfamily: Acrocercopinae
- Genus: Corethrovalva; Vári, 1961

Type species
- Corethrovalva allophylina Vári, 1961

Species
- See text

Genus of moths

Corethrovalva is a genus of moths in the family Gracillariidae. It has three currently known species, all from South Africa.

== Species ==
- Corethrovalva allophylina Vári, 1961
- Corethrovalva goniosema Vári, 1961
- Corethrovalva paraplesia Vári, 1961
