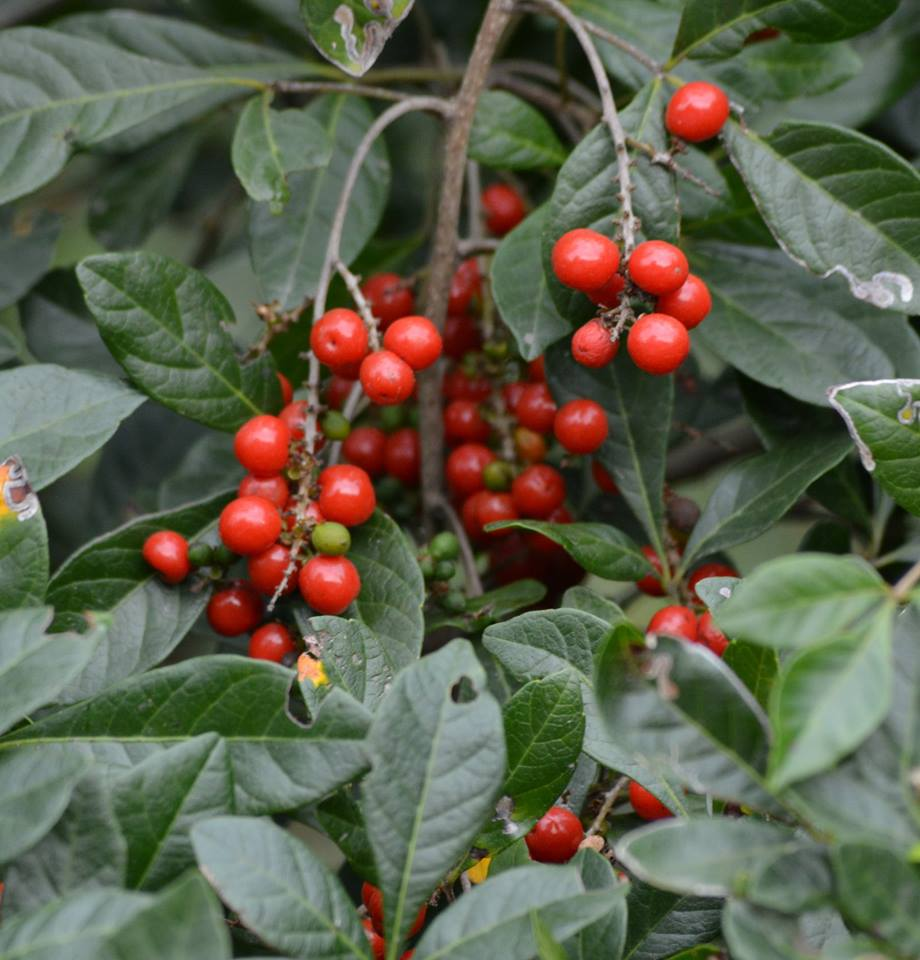

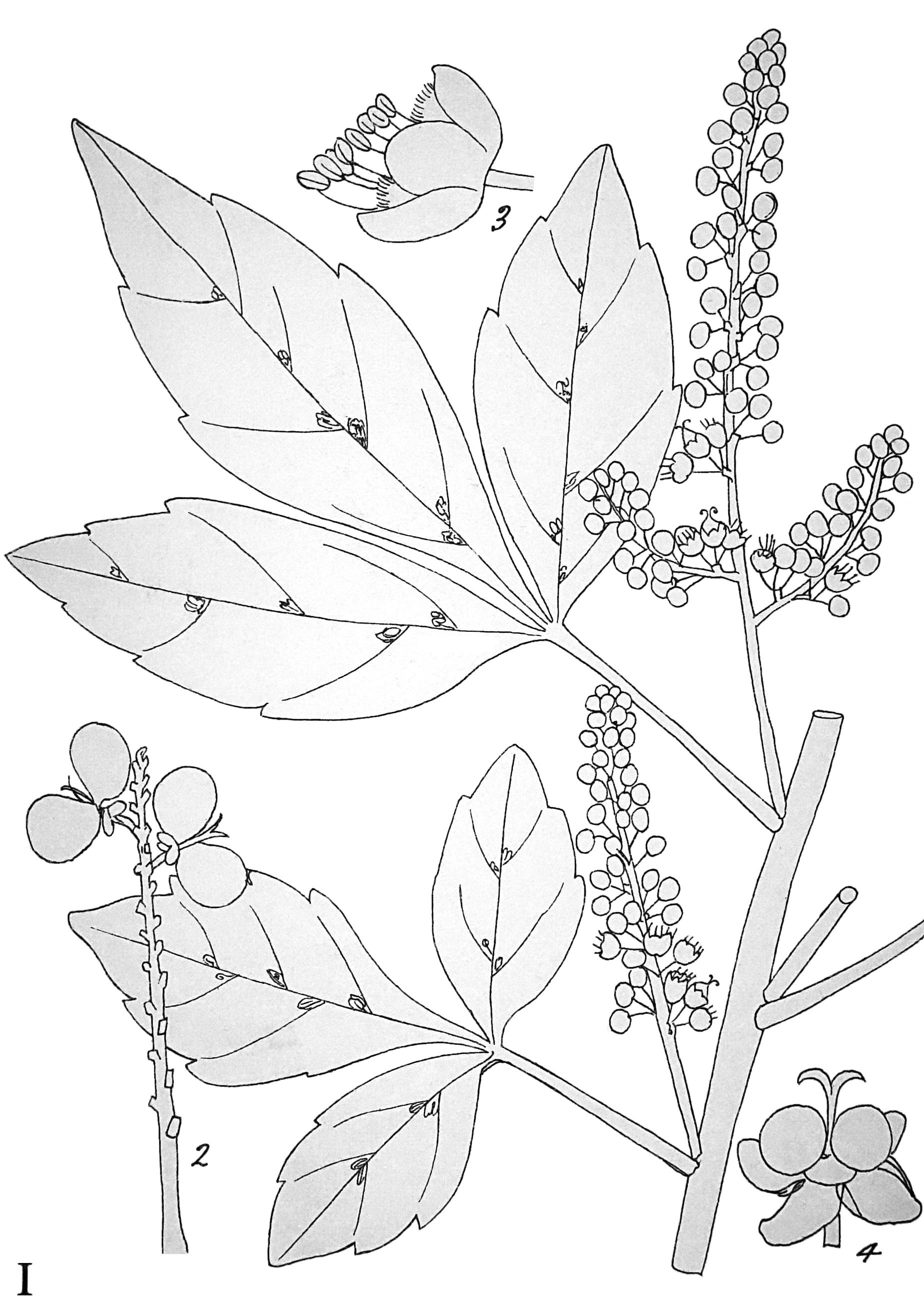
- Thomas Robertson Sim (1858-1938); Forest Flora of the Cape of Good Hope

Scientific classification
- Kingdom: Plantae
- Clade: Tracheophytes
- Clade: Angiosperms
- Clade: Eudicots
- Clade: Rosids
- Order: Sapindales
- Family: Sapindaceae
- Genus: Allophylus
- Species: A. decipiens

Binomial name
- Allophylus decipiens (E.Mey.) Radlk.

Synonyms
- Rhus spicata Thunb. (1818); Schmidelia decipiens Sond. (1860); Allophylus spicatus (Thunb.) Fourc. (1932)

= Allophylus decipiens =

Bastard taaibos

Species of flowering plant

Allophylus decipiens (E.Mey.) Radlk., commonly known as the bastard taaibos, is a multi- or single-stemmed, small, evergreen tree about 3–4 m in height occurring in coastal forest, fringe forest and thickets, and wooded ravines and streams. Found up to 800 m in the southern coastal regions of the Cape Province, KwaZulu-Natal, Eswatini, along the escarpment forest of Mpumalanga, including Soutpansberg and in Mozambique. There are some 219 species in the genus of Allophylus.

It has a pale grey bark and glabrous, trifoliolate leaves, which may be deeply to shallow lobed. Its fragrant flowers are small and whitish in clusters of three in dense axillary racemes up to 6 cm, or in 2-3 branched panicles, the fertile flowers being few in a panicle, otherwise male. Sepals greenish-white glabrous, petals as long as the sepals, fringed; stamens longer, filaments hairy at the base. Fruit of 2 cocci or 1 by abortion. Fruit is near-spherical and some 6 mm in diameter, maturing to bright red. Wood white, close-grained and hard.

"Branchlets and petioles minutely downy; leaflets sessile, oblongo-lanceolate or obovate, narrowed at base, toothed near the apex, with revolute margins, glabrous, paler below, and bearded in the axils of the veins; peduncles undivided, equalling the leaves; fl. spicato-racemose; carpels 2–1, rather large, obovate (when dry), reddish. A smaller shrub than the preceding, with small leaves, and short, undivided racemes. Branches ash-coloured; branchlets whitish. Common petiole 1 inch long. Middle leaflet 1 1/2–2 inches long, 7–10 lines wide; lateral smaller, all coriaceous, shining above, cuneate and very entire in the lower half, with a few larger or smaller teeth from the middle to the apex, obtuse or obtusely acuminate, mucronulate. Spikes including the peduncle 1–2 inches long. Flowers small, greenish or brownish, shining; their parts, &c., as in S. melanocarpa. Ovaries divaricate; style bifid. Carpels twice as large as in the other species, 2 1/2–3 lines long, 2 lines wide. Rhus undulata, Jacq. Schoenb. t. 346, though very like this species, differs in its paniculate, dioecious, pentandrous flowers."

— Flora Capensis, Vol 1, page 236, (1894) W. Sonder
