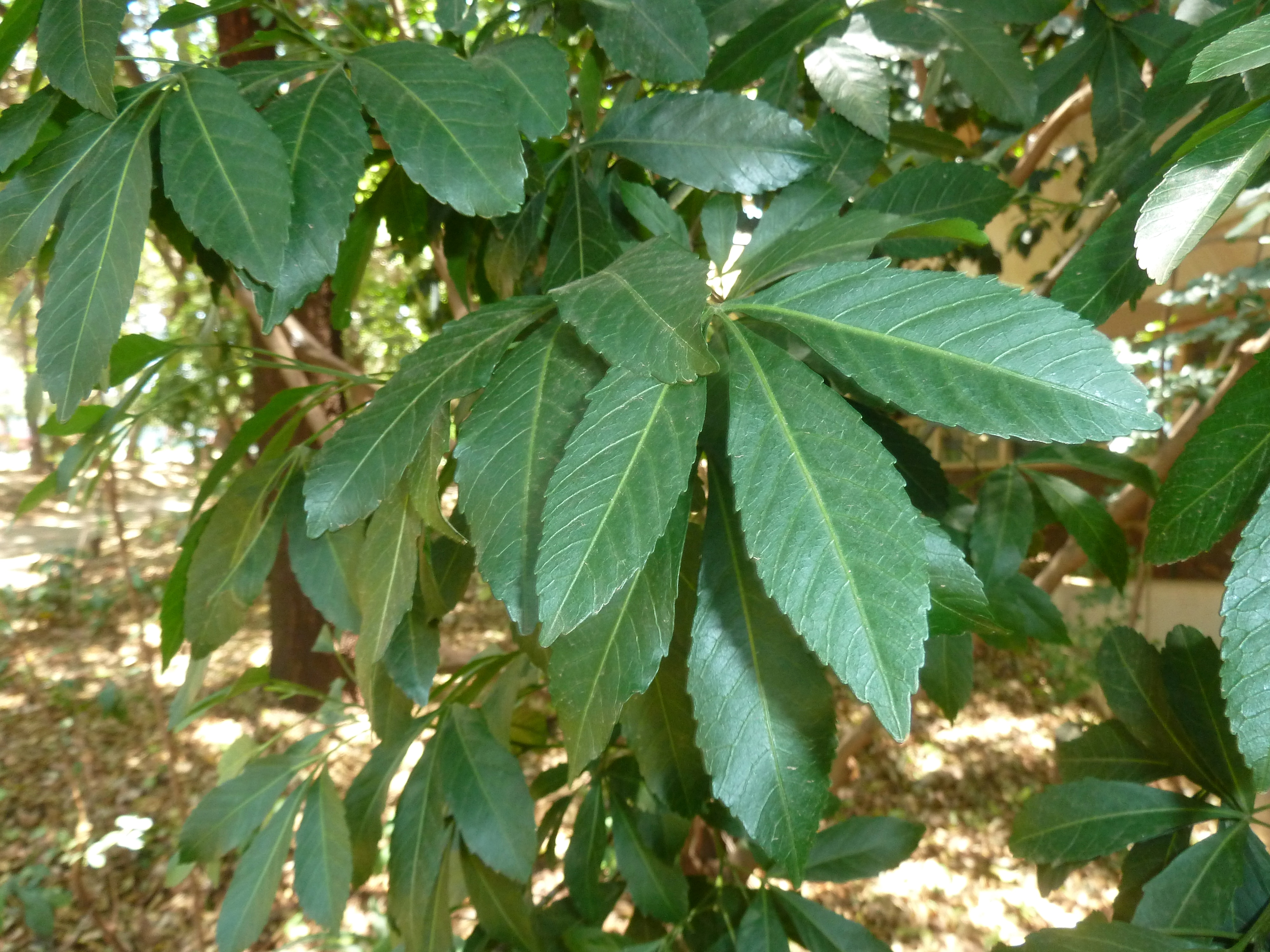

Scientific classification
- Kingdom: Plantae
- Clade: Tracheophytes
- Clade: Angiosperms
- Clade: Eudicots
- Clade: Rosids
- Order: Sapindales
- Family: Sapindaceae
- Genus: Allophylus
- Species: A. natalensis

Binomial name
- Allophylus natalensis (Sond.) De Winter

Synonyms
- Allophylus erosus Radlk.; Rhus erosa Drège ex C.Presl; Schmidelia erosa Arn.; Schmidelia natalensis Sond. (1860) (basionym)

= Allophylus natalensis =

Species of flowering plant

Allophylus natalensis, commonly known as the dune false crowberry or dune false currant, is a species of plant in the genus Allophylus native to south-eastern Africa.

== Description ==
Allophylus natalensis is a small evergreen tree with a single stem up to 5 m (16 ft) tall, or it may develop as a bush with multiple, shorter stems. The bark is greyish-brown and may have a smooth texture or develop wrinkles. The smaller branches are greyish-white and downy. The leaves are borne on long petioles and are trifoliate, with three, almost stalkless, elliptical leaflets some 35 to 85 mm (1.4 to 3.3 in) long by 10 to 20 mm (0.4 to 0.8 in) wide. The leaflets are leathery and stiff, glossy green above, and pale green below, with shallowly toothed margins. The small fragrant flowers grow in spike-like racemes in the axils of the leaves, and are followed by abundant red, globular berries, 7 mm (0.3 in) in diameter. Flowering takes place in autumn between March and May and the berries ripen in late winter, between June and August.

== Distribution and habitat ==
This tree is native to the Eastern Cape Province and KwaZulu-Natal in South Africa and to southern Mozambique. Its natural habitat is coastal dune forest and scrub, where it often grows in association with Mimusops afra, Apodytes dimidiata and Canthium obovatum.

== Ecology ==
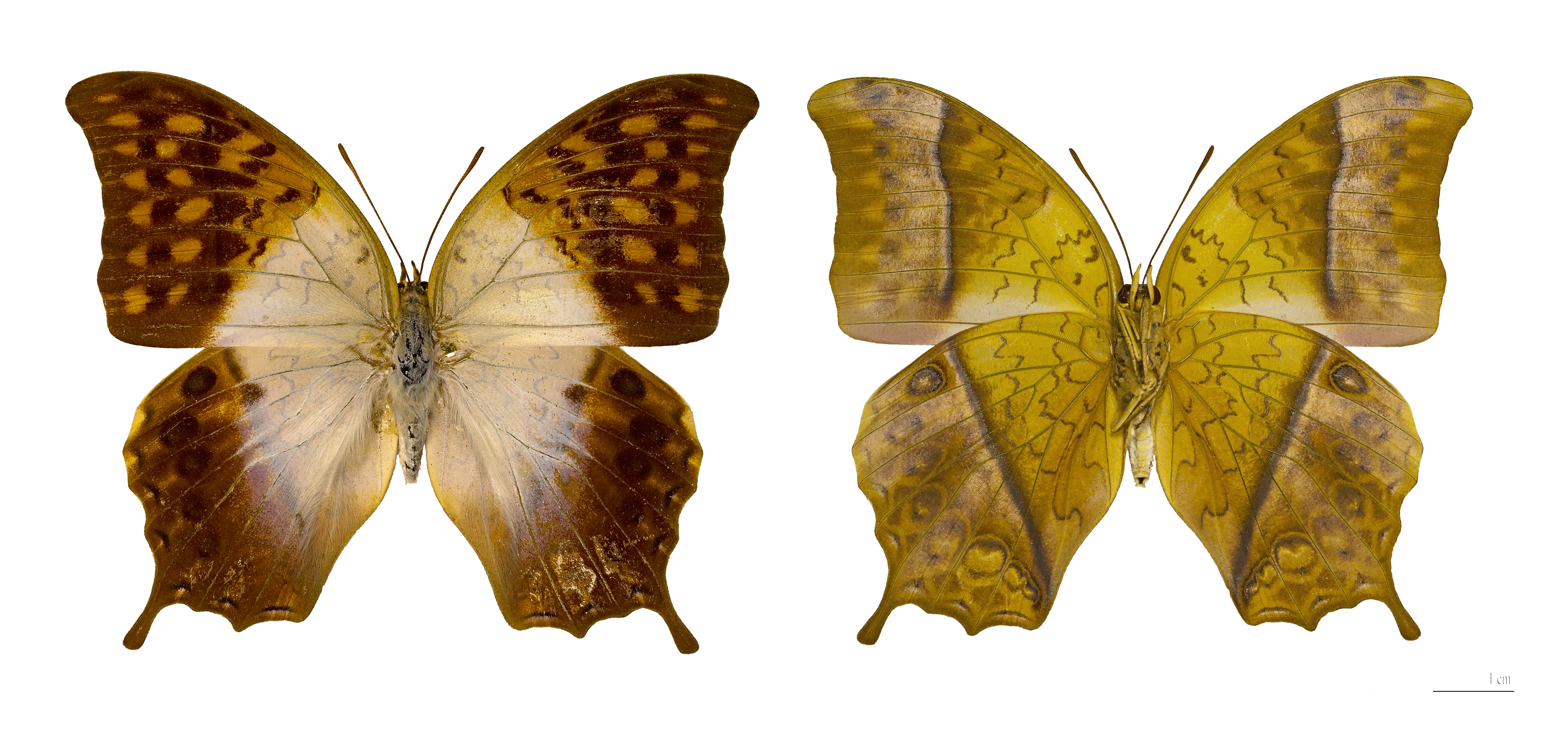
Charaxes varanes vologeses

The flowers are pollinated by butterflies and the berries are appreciated by both birds, which disperse the seeds, and humans. The larvae of the pearl emperor butterfly (Charaxes varanes subsp. vologeses) feed on the foliage, and the larvae of Corethrovalva goniosema, a moth in the family Gracillariidae, mine the leaves, as do the larvae of Stigmella allophylica, a moth in the family Nepticulidae.
