= Allophylus pachyphyllus =

Conservation status
- Vulnerable (IUCN 2.3)

Scientific classification
- Kingdom: Plantae
- Clade: Tracheophytes
- Clade: Angiosperms
- Clade: Eudicots
- Clade: Rosids
- Order: Sapindales
- Family: Sapindaceae
- Genus: Allophylus
- Species: A. pachyphyllus

Binomial name
- Allophylus pachyphyllus Radlk.

Species of flowering plant

Allophylus pachyphyllus is a species of plant in the family Sapindaceae. It is endemic to Jamaica.
