= Allophylus timoriensis =

Scientific classification
- Kingdom: Plantae
- Clade: Tracheophytes
- Clade: Angiosperms
- Clade: Eudicots
- Clade: Rosids
- Order: Sapindales
- Family: Sapindaceae
- Genus: Allophylus
- Species: A. timoriensis

Binomial name
- Allophylus timoriensis (DC.) Blume

Synonyms
- Schmidelia timoriensis DC.; Allophylus litoralis Blume; Allophylus marquesensis F.Br.; Allophylus sublaxus Gillespie; Allophylus sundanus Miq.; Allophylus vitiensis Radlk.; Aporetica penicillata Blanco; Schmidelia lasiostemon Beck

Species of plant

Allophylus timoriensis (synonym Allophylus marquesensis) is a species of plant in the family Sapindaceae. It is native to an area from Thailand through Southeast Asia to islands of the Pacific Ocean.
