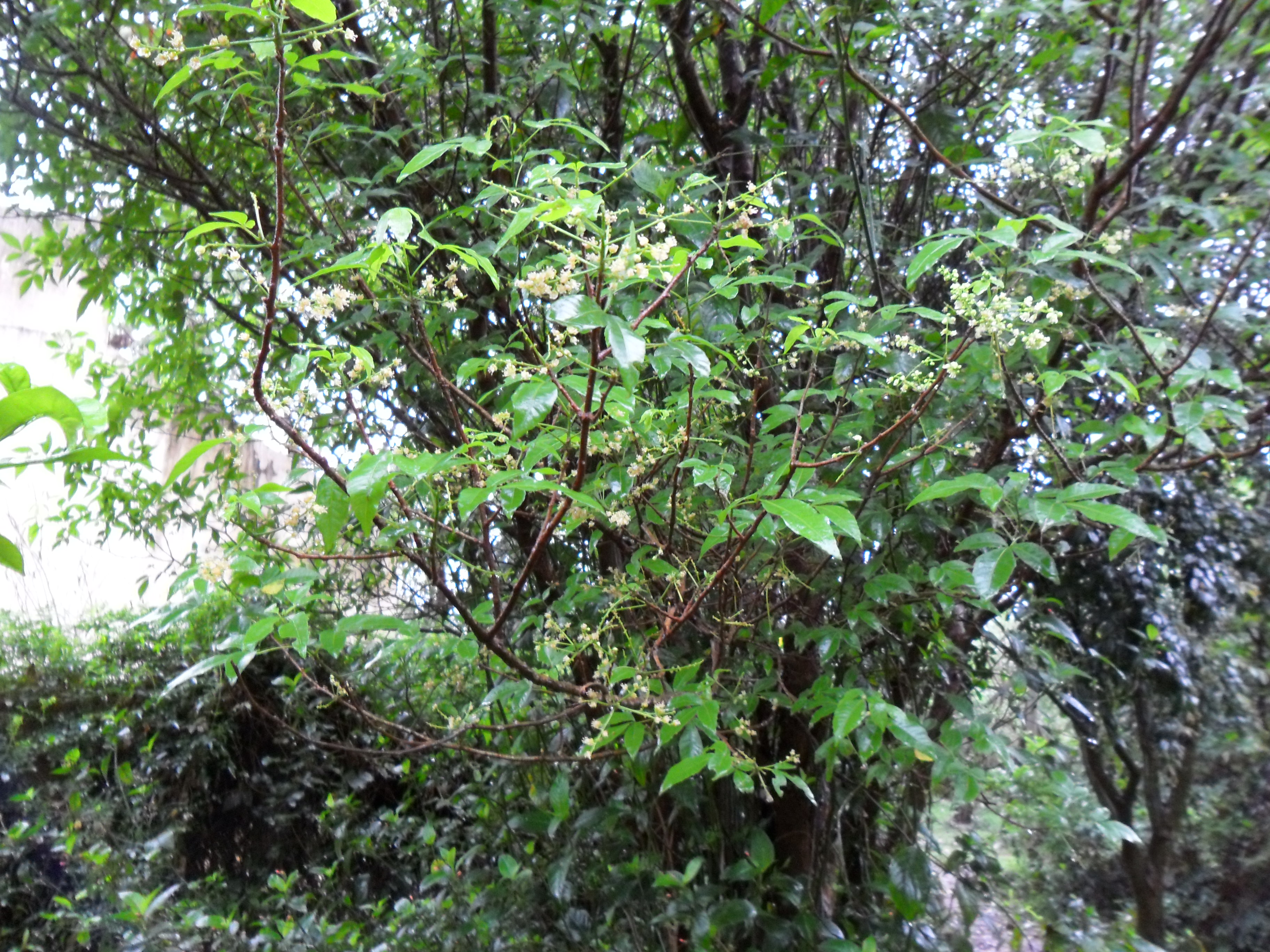

Scientific classification
- Kingdom: Plantae
- Clade: Tracheophytes
- Clade: Angiosperms
- Clade: Eudicots
- Clade: Rosids
- Order: Sapindales
- Family: Sapindaceae
- Genus: Allophylus
- Species: A. edulis

Binomial name
- Allophylus edulis (A St.Hil.) Radlk.

= Allophylus edulis =

Species of flowering plant

Allophylus edulis (Portuguese: chal-chal) is a plant species in the genus Allophylus endemic to the Guianas, Brazil, Bolivia, Paraguay, Argentina and Uruguay.

== Phytochemistry ==
Quebrachitol, a cyclitol, and viridiflorol, a sesquiterpenoid, are found in A. edulis.

== Vernacular names ==
This plant has several different common names.

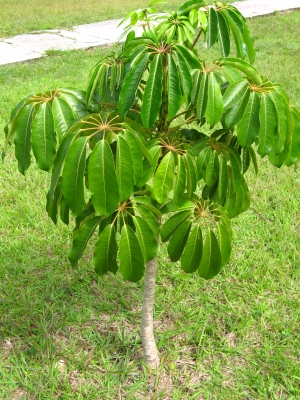
Young allophylus edulis

In Paraguay it's called kokû, with a nasal ending. In Argentina, the common name is chal-chal (hence Los Chalchaleros, a folkloric music group), as in Portuguese. Other names in Brazil are aperta-goela, baga-de-morcego, chala-chala, chale-chale, cocum, fruta-de-paraó, fruta-de-passarinho, fruta-de-pavão, fruta-de-pavó, fruta-de-pombo, murta-branca, murta-vermelha, olho-de-pombo, pé-de-galinha, quebra-queixo, vacum and vacunzeiro.
