= Allophylus rubifolius =

Conservation status
- Least Concern (IUCN 3.1)

Scientific classification
- Kingdom: Plantae
- Clade: Tracheophytes
- Clade: Angiosperms
- Clade: Eudicots
- Clade: Rosids
- Order: Sapindales
- Family: Sapindaceae
- Genus: Allophylus
- Species: A. rubifolius

Binomial name
- Allophylus rubifolius (Hochst. ex A.Rich.) Engl. (1892)

Varieties
- Allophylus rubifolius var. alnifolius (Baker) Friis & Vollesen; Allophylus rubifolius var. dasystachys (Gilg) Verdc.; Allophylus rubifolius var. rhusiphyllus (Balf.f.) Friis & Vollesen; Allophylus rubifolius var. rubifolius

Synonyms
- Schmidelia rubifolia Hochst. ex A.Rich. (1848)

Species of flowering plant

Allophyllus rubifolius is a species of flowering plant in the family Sapindaceae. It is a shrub or tree native to eastern, east-central, and southeastern Africa, ranging from Eritrea to Democratic Republic of the Congo and Kwazulu-Natal, and to the Arabian Peninsula.

== Varieties ==
Four varieties are accepted.

- Allophylus rubifolius var. alnifolius (Baker) Friis & Vollesen – Ethiopia to Democratic Republic of the Congo and Mozambique
- Allophylus rubifolius var. dasystachys (Gilg) Verdc. – Kenya and northern Tanzania
- Allophylus rubifolius var. rhusiphyllus (Balf.f.) Friis & Vollesen - northeastern Somalia and Socotra Archipelago
- Allophylus rubifolius var. rubifolius – Eritrea to southern Africa and Arabian Peninsula
