= Allophylus dodsonii =

Conservation status
- Endangered (IUCN 3.1)

Scientific classification
- Kingdom: Plantae
- Clade: Tracheophytes
- Clade: Angiosperms
- Clade: Eudicots
- Clade: Rosids
- Order: Sapindales
- Family: Sapindaceae
- Genus: Allophylus
- Species: A. dodsonii

Binomial name
- Allophylus dodsonii Gentry

Species of flowering plant

Allophylus dodsonii is a species of flowering plant in the family Sapindaceae. It is a tree endemic to Ecuador.
