= Allophylus chirindensis =

Conservation status
- Vulnerable (IUCN 2.3)

Scientific classification
- Kingdom: Plantae
- Clade: Tracheophytes
- Clade: Angiosperms
- Clade: Eudicots
- Clade: Rosids
- Order: Sapindales
- Family: Sapindaceae
- Genus: Allophylus
- Species: A. chirindensis

Binomial name
- Allophylus chirindensis Baker f.

Species of flowering plant

Allophylus chirindensis is a species of plant in the family Sapindaceae. It is native to Kenya, Mozambique, Tanzania and Zimbabwe. It is threatened by habitat loss.
