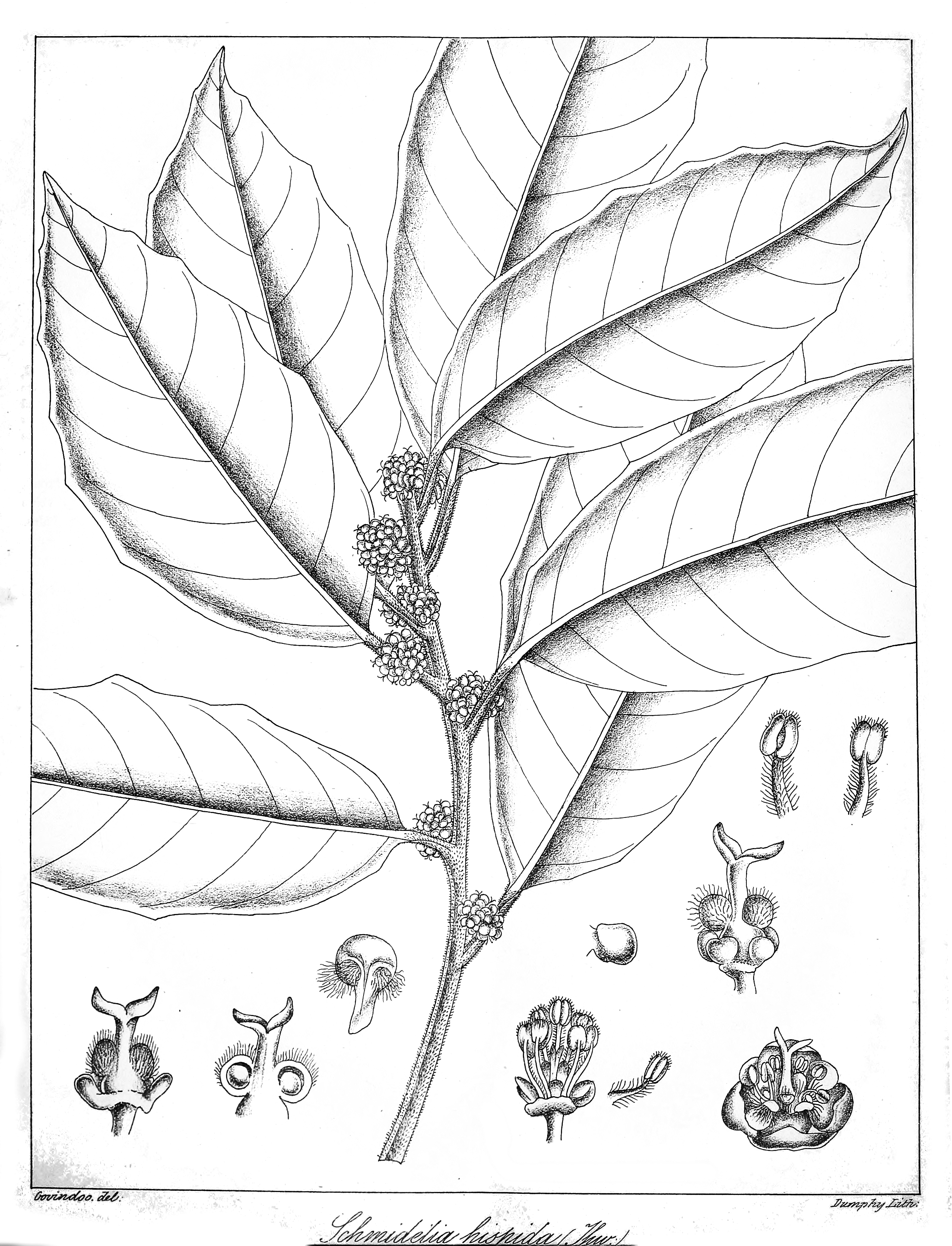

Conservation status
- Vulnerable (IUCN 2.3)

Scientific classification
- Kingdom: Plantae
- Clade: Tracheophytes
- Clade: Angiosperms
- Clade: Eudicots
- Clade: Rosids
- Order: Sapindales
- Family: Sapindaceae
- Genus: Allophylus
- Species: A. zeylanicus

Binomial name
- Allophylus zeylanicus L.

Synonyms
- Allophylus acuminatus (Thwaites) Radlk.; Allophylus hispidus (Thwaites) Trimen; Allophylus varians (Thwaites) Radlk.; Ornitrophe allophyllus Pers.; Schmidelia acuminata Thwaites; Schmidelia allophyllus DC.; Schmidelia conferta Blanco; Schmidelia hispida Thwaites; Schmidelia varians Thwaites

= Allophylus zeylanicus =

Species of flowering plant

Allophylus zeylanicus (Sinhala: වල් කොබ්බෑ - wal kobbe) is a species of plant in the family Sapindaceae. It is endemic to Sri Lanka.

== Description ==
Allophylus zeylanicus grows as a small shrub or treelet. The leaves are oval in shape with points at the end, with entire margins. The bark is a whitish color, the young shots are covered in small hairs. The flowers are red, ovoid, and smooth.

== Habitat and ecology ==
Allophylus zeylanicus is found in lowland areas, wetlands, and evergreen forests. It is part of a terrestrial system. Allophylus zeylanicus occurs up to montane zone elevations of 2,000 m (6,600 ft).
