= Allophylus bullatus =

Conservation status
- Vulnerable (IUCN 3.1)

Scientific classification
- Kingdom: Plantae
- Clade: Tracheophytes
- Clade: Angiosperms
- Clade: Eudicots
- Clade: Rosids
- Order: Sapindales
- Family: Sapindaceae
- Genus: Allophylus
- Species: A. bullatus

Binomial name
- Allophylus bullatus Radlk.

Species of flowering plant

Allophylus bullatus is a species of plant in the family Sapindaceae. It is found in Cameroon, Nigeria, and São Tomé and Príncipe. Its natural habitat is subtropical or tropical moist montane forests. It is threatened by habitat loss.
