= Allophylus rhomboidalis =

Conservation status
- Least Concern (IUCN 2.3)

Scientific classification
- Kingdom: Plantae
- Clade: Tracheophytes
- Clade: Angiosperms
- Clade: Eudicots
- Clade: Rosids
- Order: Sapindales
- Family: Sapindaceae
- Genus: Allophylus
- Species: A. rhomboidalis

Binomial name
- Allophylus rhomboidalis (Nadeaud) Radlkofer

Species of plant

Allophylus rhomboidalis is a species of plant in the family Sapindaceae. It is found in French Polynesia and Pitcairn.

== See also ==
- Flora of Tubuai
