= Allophylus agbala =

Conservation status
- Critically Endangered (IUCN 3.1)

Scientific classification
- Kingdom: Plantae
- Clade: Tracheophytes
- Clade: Angiosperms
- Clade: Eudicots
- Clade: Rosids
- Order: Sapindales
- Family: Sapindaceae
- Genus: Allophylus
- Species: A. agbala

Binomial name
- Allophylus agbala Hauman

Species of flowering plant

Allophylus agbala is a species of plant in the family Sapindaceae. It is endemic to the Democratic Republic of the Congo.
