= Allophylus chartaceus =

Scientific classification
- Kingdom: Plantae
- Clade: Tracheophytes
- Clade: Angiosperms
- Clade: Eudicots
- Clade: Rosids
- Order: Sapindales
- Family: Sapindaceae
- Genus: Allophylus
- Species: A. chartaceus

Binomial name
- Allophylus chartaceus (Kurz) Radlk.

Synonyms
- Schmidelia chartacea Kurz; Croton bhasanthiae T.K.Paul; Allophylus zeylanicus var. grandifolius Hiern

Species of plant

Allophylus chartaceus is a species of flowering plant species in the family Sapindaceae. It is native to China, India, and Bhutan.

The plant is a shrub with simple leaves, and inflorescences in pairs or groups rather than solitary. It produces fleshy red fruits up to 1 cm in diameter.
