= Allophylus aldabricus =

Conservation status
- Vulnerable (IUCN 2.3)

Scientific classification
- Kingdom: Plantae
- Clade: Tracheophytes
- Clade: Angiosperms
- Clade: Eudicots
- Clade: Rosids
- Order: Sapindales
- Family: Sapindaceae
- Genus: Allophylus
- Species: A. aldabricus

Binomial name
- Allophylus aldabricus Radlk. (1908 publ. 1909)

Species of flowering plant

Allophylus aldabricus is a species of plant in the family Sapindaceae. It is endemic to Aldabra in the Seychelles. It is threatened by habitat loss.
