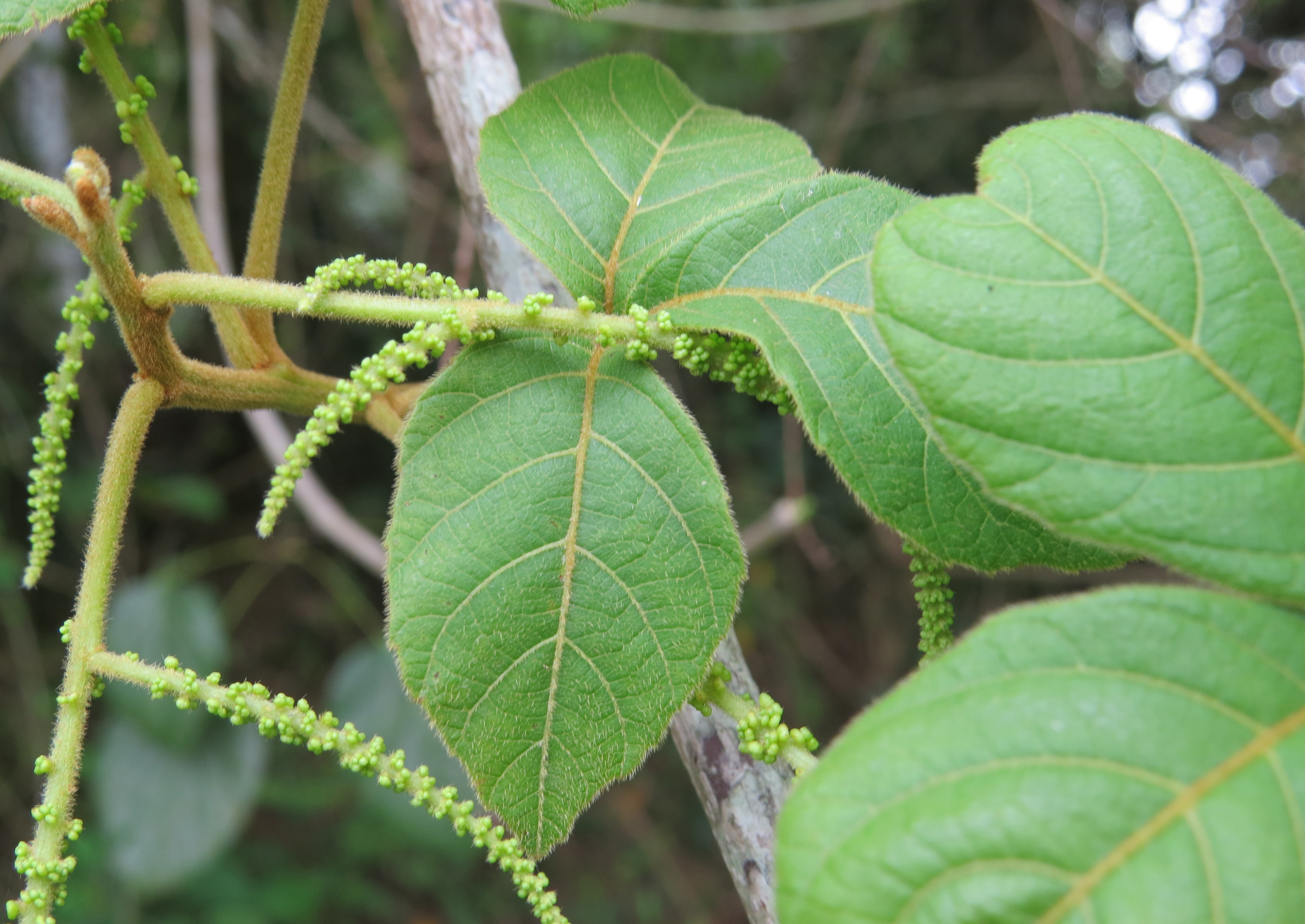

Conservation status
- Least Concern (NCA)

Scientific classification
- Kingdom: Plantae
- Clade: Tracheophytes
- Clade: Angiosperms
- Clade: Eudicots
- Clade: Rosids
- Order: Sapindales
- Family: Sapindaceae
- Genus: Allophylus
- Species: A. cobbe

Binomial name
- Allophylus cobbe (L.) Forsyth fil.

Synonyms
- List: Rhus arborea Macfad. ex Griseb.; Rhus cobbe L.; Allophylus filiger Radlk.; Allophylus serrulatus Radlk.; Aporetica gemella DC.; Gemella trifoliata Lour.; Ornitrophe asiatica Steud.; Ornitrophe cobbe (L.) Willd.; Ornitrophe malabarica Hiern; Ornitrophe schmidelia Pers.; Pometia ternata Willd.; Pometia ternata G.Forst.; Schmidelia adenophylla Wall.; Schmidelia cobbe (L.) DC.; Schmidelia cochinchinensis DC.; Schmidelia dentata Wall. ex Voigt; Schmidelia gemella Cambess.; Schmidelia kobbe Lam.; Schmidelia obovata A.Gray; Schmidelia orientalis Sw.; Schmidelia ornitrophioides Wall.; Schmidelia vestita Wall.; Toxicodendrum cobbe (L.) Gaertn.

= Allophylus cobbe =

Titberry, Indian allophylus

Species of plant in the soapberry family

Allophylus cobbe, commonly known as titberry or Indian allophylus, is a pantropical shrub in the family Sapindaceae with many uses in traditional medicine. It has a highly variable morphology throughout its range and may prove to be more than one species.

== Description ==
The described size of Allophylus cobbe varies greatly from place to place. In Australia it is known as a small to large shrub, and "never a tree". In India however it is described as a "shrub to small tree", while in Papua New Guinea it is described as a tree "up to 25 m high". The compound leaves are usually trifoliolate but may have from one to five leaflets. The petiole may be from 2 to 11 cm (0.8 to 4.3 in) long, the petiolules of the leaflets up to 1 cm (0.39 in) long. The leaflet blades are acuminate, obovate or elliptic, with pointed tips and cuneate bases, and the margins may be crenate towards the distal end. The leaf surfaces vary from glabrous to tomentose

Many small actinomorphic flowers to 2 mm (0.1 in) diameter are borne on a 2–16 cm (0.8–6.3 in) long inflorescence, which is racemose and may be branched or unbranched. The resulting fruit are a glabrous red drupe measuring from 4 to 16 mm (0.2 to 0.6 in) in diameter, containing a single large seed.

== Taxonomy ==
This species was first described in Species Plantarum by Carl Linnaeus in 1753, who gave it the name Rhus cobbe. It was later renamed Allophylus cobbe by William Forsyth Junior and published in Botanical Nomenclator in 1794.

The wide variation in appearance of this species lead some to believe that it is polyphyletic and that the genus is in need of taxonomic revision.

== Distribution and habitat ==
Allophylus cobbe has a pantropical distribution, being found in tropical (and some subtropical) areas of Africa, Asia, Oceania and the Americas.

It grows in monsoon forest, littoral forest and on the margins of mangrove forest, often on sandy soils. In Australia it is recorded at elevations from sea level to around 500 m (1,600 ft).

== Uses and ecology ==
Titberry has many uses in Ayurveda and other traditional medicine practices. The plant has been used as a mouthwash and to treat ulcers and wounds, bone fractures, rashes, bruises, diarrhoea, fever and stomach ache.

The timber has been used for roofing and firewood, and for making bows, rafts and fish traps. The fruits are edible, and can also be used as fish poison.

This species is the host plant for the moths Cleora injectaria and Gonodontis clelia, and for the butterfly Nacaduba pavana singapura.

== Gallery ==
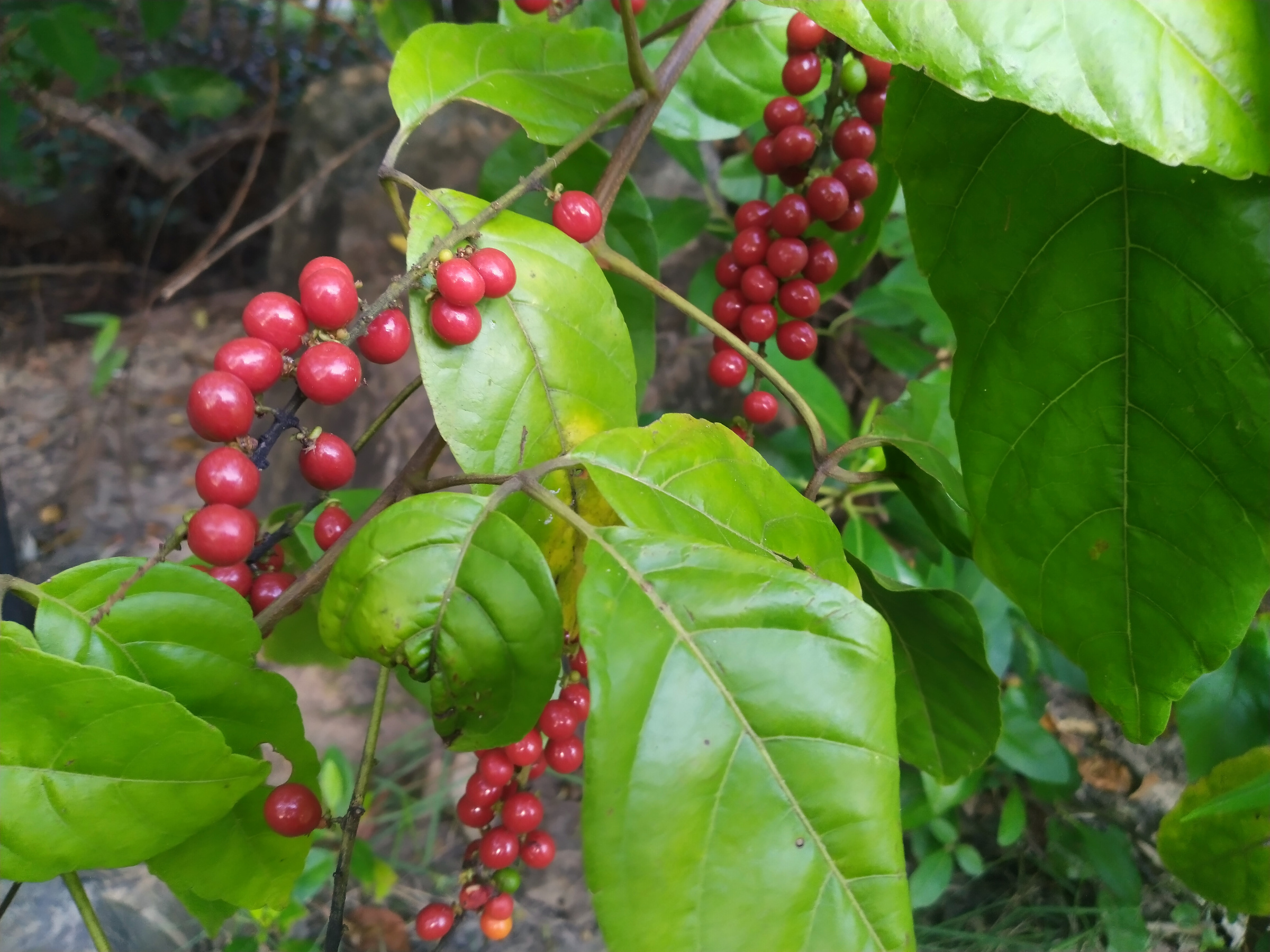
Fruits in QLD, Australia, April 2022

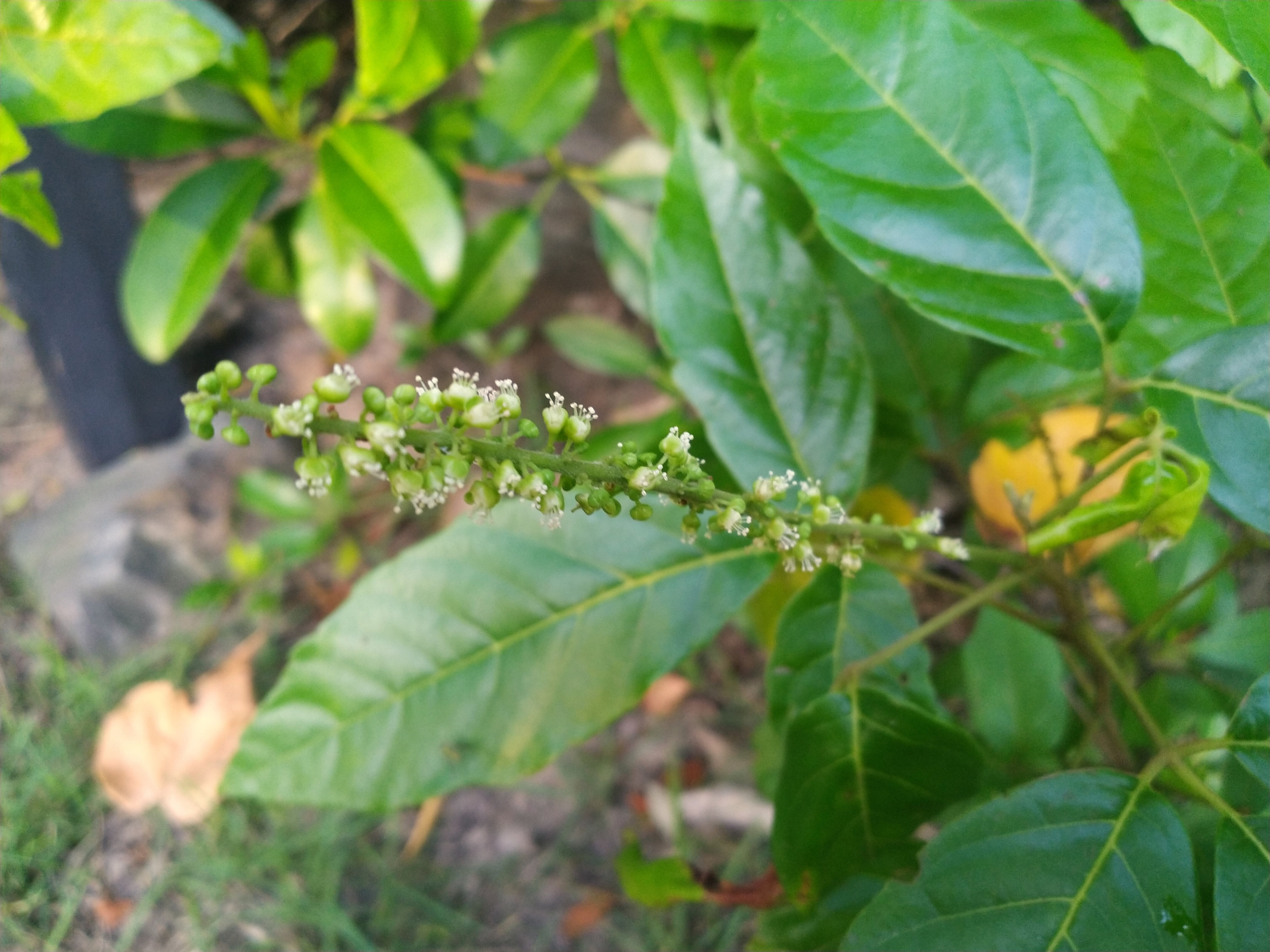
Flowers - QLD, Australia, April 2022

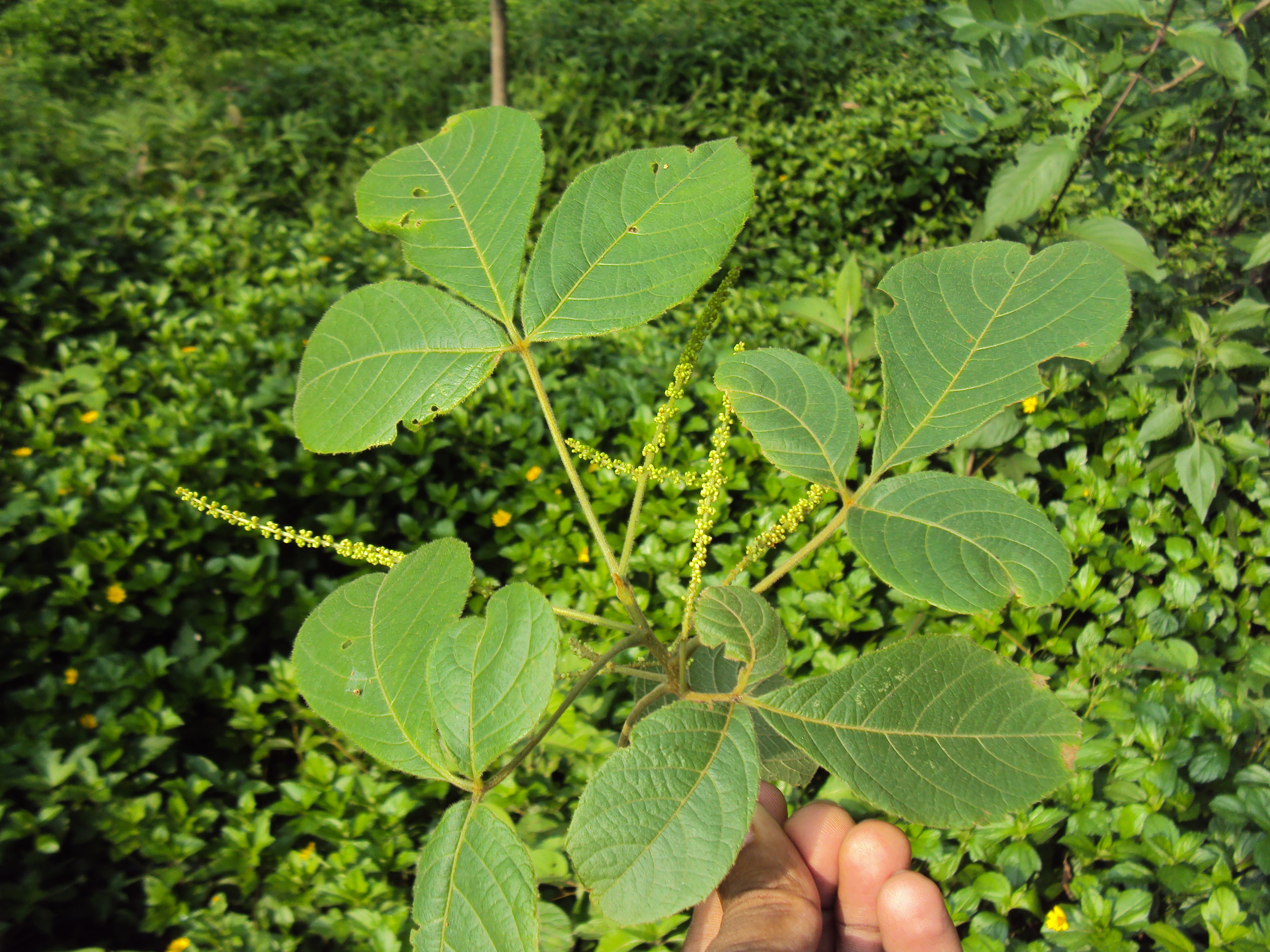
Leaves and flowers at Periya, India, 2014

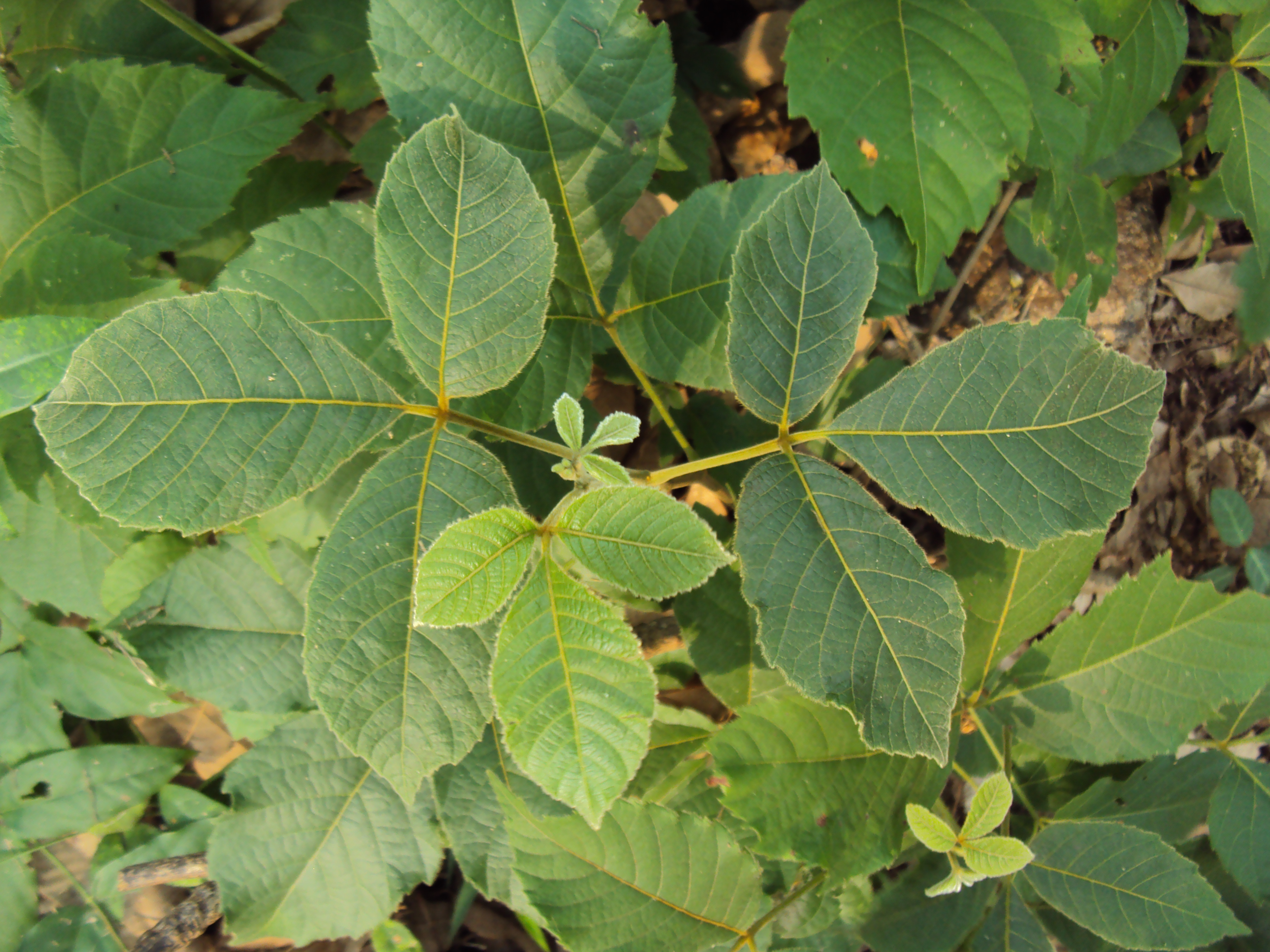
Trifoliate leaves
