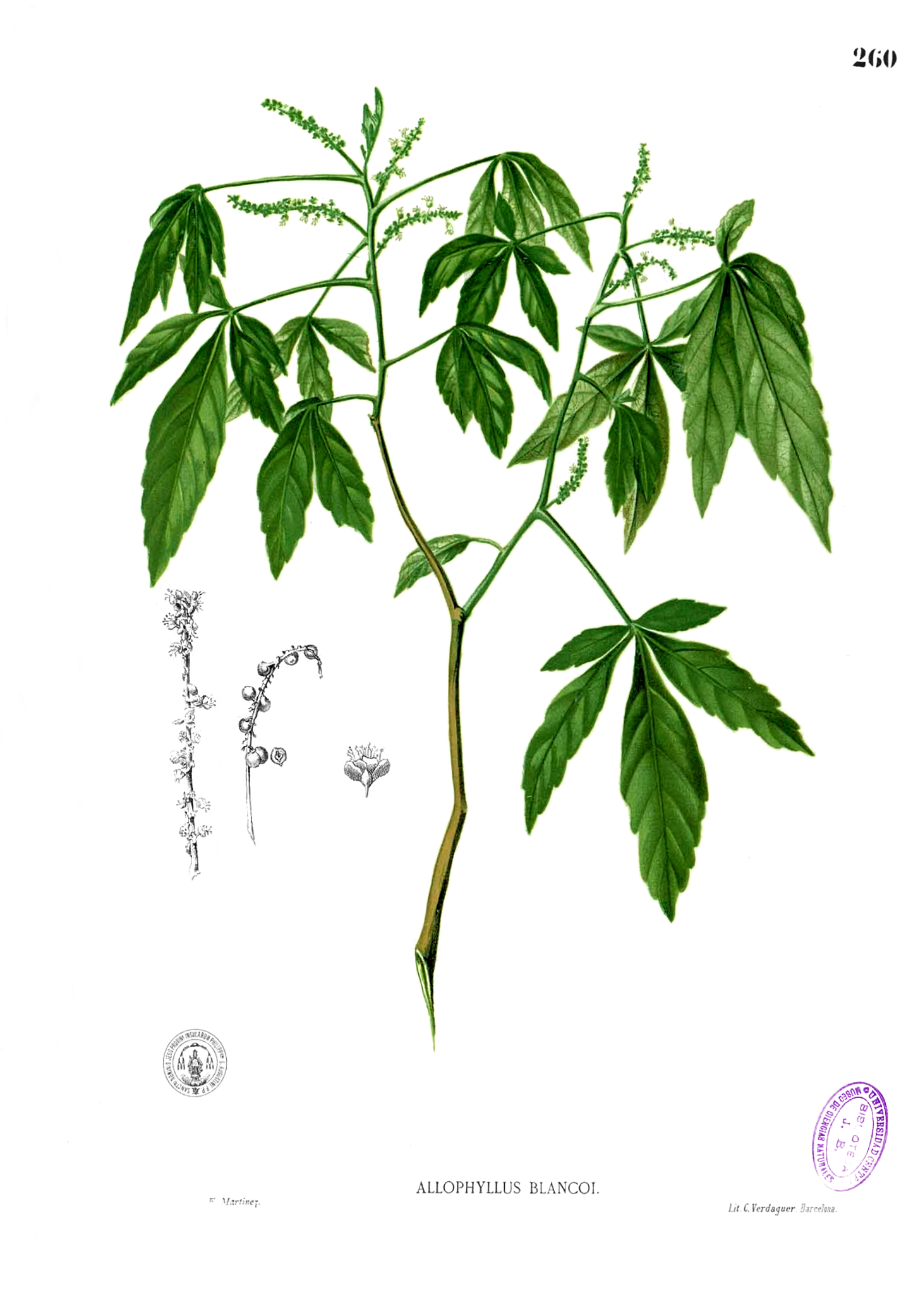
- Allophylus cobbe

Scientific classification
- Kingdom: Plantae
- Clade: Tracheophytes
- Clade: Angiosperms
- Clade: Eudicots
- Clade: Rosids
- Order: Sapindales
- Family: Sapindaceae
- Subfamily: Sapindoideae
- Genus: Allophylus; L. (1753)

Diversity
- c. 200 species

Synonyms
- Aporetica J.R.Forst. & G.Forst. (1776); Azamara Hochst. ex Rchb. (1841); Cominia P.Browne (1756); Gemella Lour. (1790); Nassavia Vell. (1829); Ornitrophe Comm. ex Juss. (1789); Schmidelia L. (1767), nom. illeg.; Toxicodendrum Gaertn. (1788); Usubis Burm.f. (1768)

= Allophylus =

Genus of flowering plants

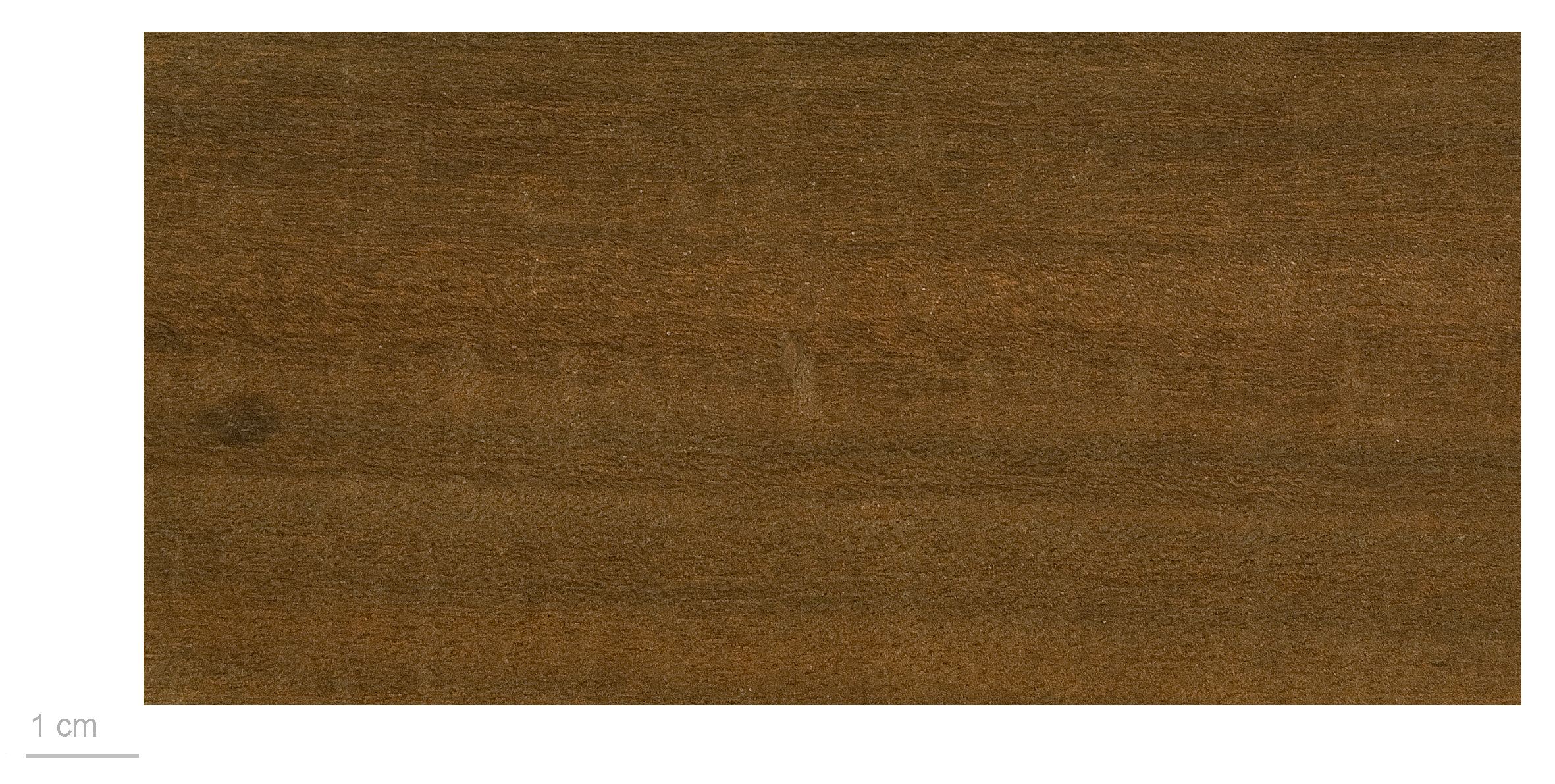
Allophylus timoriensis - MHNT

Allophylus is a genus within the plant family Sapindaceae. It includes 211 species with a pantropical distribution.

== Selected species ==
- Allophylus agbala Hauman – Central Africa (DRC)
- Allophylus aldabricus Radlk. – Indian Ocean (Seychelles)
- Allophylus bullatus Radlk. – Central Africa
- Allophylus chartaceus (Kurz) Radlkofer – South/Southeast Asia
- Allophylus chirindensis Baker f. – Southern Africa
- Allophylus cobbe (L.) Rausch. – Pantropical
- Allophylus decipiens (E.Mey.) Radlk. – Southern Africa
- Allophylus dodsonii A.H.Gentry – South America (Ecuador)
- Allophylus edulis (St.Hil.) Radlk. – South America
- Allophylus natalensis (Sond.) De Winter – Southern Africa
- Allophylus pachyphyllus Radlk. – Caribbean (Jamaica)
- Allophylus rapensis F. Brown – Oceania (French Polynesia)
- Allophylus rhomboidalis (Nadeaud) Radlk. – Oceania (French Polynesia and Pitcairn)
- Allophylus rubifolius (Hochst. ex A.Rich.) Engl. – eastern to southern Africa and Arabian Peninsula
  - Allophylus rubifolius var. alnifolius (Baker) Friis & Vollesen
  - Allophylus rubifolius var. dasystachys (Gilg) Verdc.
  - Allophylus rubifolius var. rhusiphyllus (Balf.f.) Friis & Vollesen
  - Allophylus rubifolius var. rubifolius
- Allophylus timoriensis (DC.) Blume – Southeast Asia, Pacific
- Allophylus zeylanicus L. – Sri Lanka
