= Sweet potato cultivation in Polynesia =

Agricultural practice

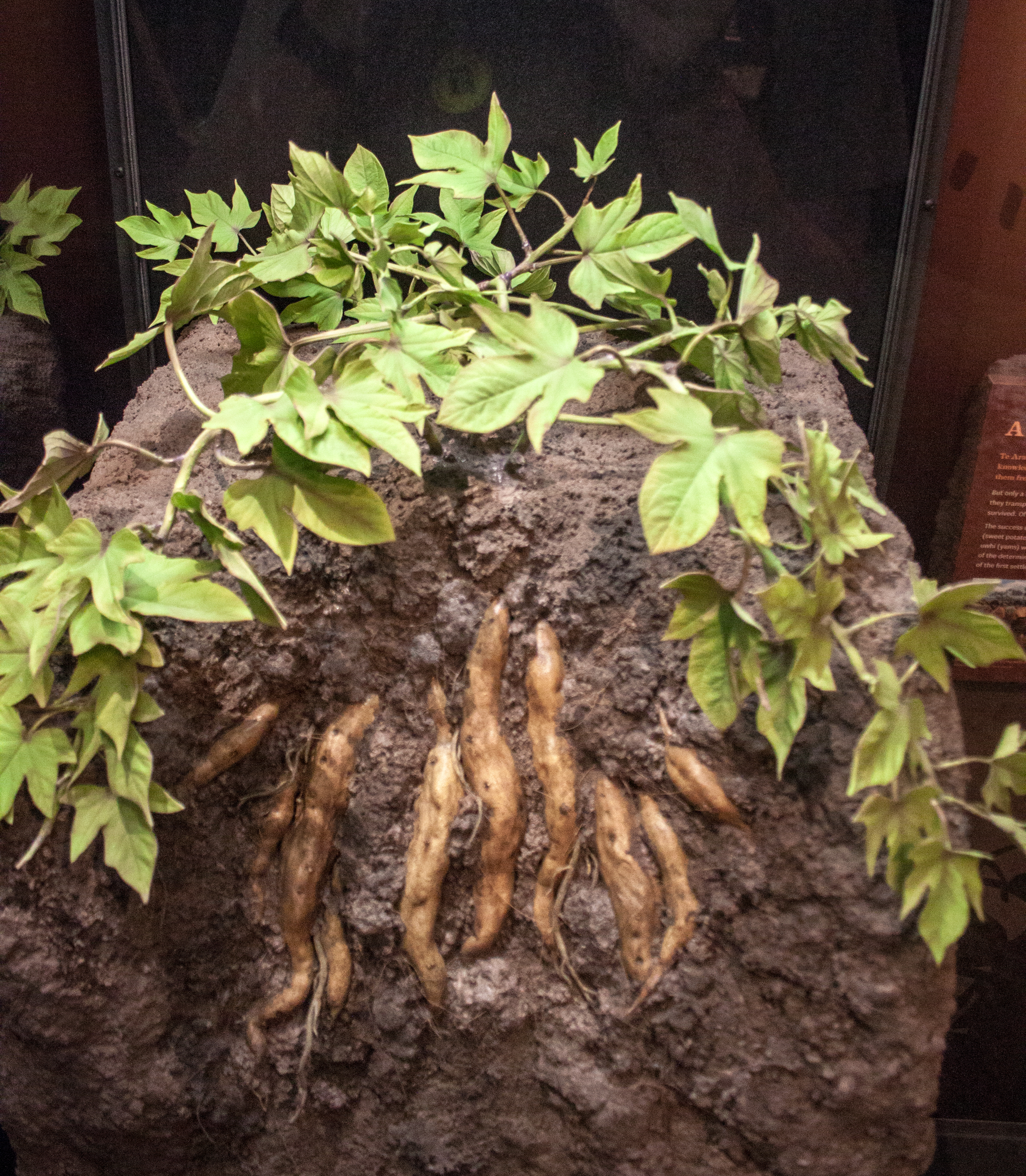
Taputini, a pre-European cultivar of sweet potato (kūmara) from New Zealand

Sweet potato cultivation in Polynesia began around 1000 AD in central Polynesia. The plant became a common food across the region, especially in Hawaii, Easter Island and New Zealand, where it became a staple food. By the 17th century in central Polynesia, traditional cultivars were being replaced with hardier and larger varieties from the Americas (a process which began later in New Zealand, in the early 19th century). Many traditional cultivars are still grown across Polynesia, but they are rare and are not widely commercially grown.

It is not currently known how sweet potato began to be cultivated in the Pacific. Some scholars suggest that the presence of sweet potato in Polynesia is evidence of Polynesian contact with South America. However, some genetic studies of traditional cultivars suggest that sweet potato was first dispersed to Polynesia before human settlement.

== History ==
The sweet potato plant (Ipomoea batatas) is originally from the Americas, and became widely cultivated in Central and South America by 2500 BC. Sweet potato is thought to have been first grown as a food crop in central Polynesia around 1000–1100 AD, with the earliest archaeological evidence being fragments recovered from a single location on Mangaia in the southern Cook Islands, carbon dated between 988 and 1155 AD. Over the next few centuries, sweet potato was spread to the extremes of the Polynesian Triangle: Easter Island, Hawaii and New Zealand. Sweet potatoes may have spread so rapidly in the Pacific because Polynesian gardeners saw these plants as an improvement on already grown Dioscorea species, such as the purple yam. The plant was likely spread between Polynesian islands by vine cuttings rather than by seeds.

The prevailing theory for the lineages of sweet potato seen in Polynesia is the tripartite hypothesis developed in the 1950s and 1960s: that an original kumara lineage was brought from the west coast of South America circa 1000 AD, and later superseded by two lineages introduced by Spanish galleons and Portuguese traders circa 1500 AD, the Central American camote lineage and the Caribbean batata lineage. Sweet potato became a major staple more so at the extremities of Polynesian culture – such as in pre-European contact Hawaii, Easter Island and New Zealand – than in central Polynesia. During the 1600s, traditional Polynesian cultivars of sweet potato and calabash began to be replaced with North American varieties. During reintroduction, the sweet potato had become entirely absent from many central Polynesian islands (such as the Cook Islands, except Mangaia).

=== Pre-Columbian contact theory ===
Some researchers cite the presence of the sweet potato in the Pacific as evidence of sporadic contact between Polynesian and Native American peoples. However, it is not currently known whether sweet potato was introduced through Polynesian canoes reaching South America, or by South American rafts visiting eastern Polynesian islands such as Rapa Nui. It is also possible that the plant was transferred without human contact, such as floating west across the ocean after being discarded from the cargo of a boat.

Genetic, cultural or linguistic links between Polynesian and Indigenous American peoples such as the Chumash people of California, the Mapuche in central and southern Chile, and the Zenú, a pre-Columbian culture of Colombia, have been hypothesised. Dutch linguists and specialists in Indigenous American languages Willem Adelaar and Pieter Muysken have suggested that the word for sweet potato is shared by Polynesian languages and languages of South America: Proto-Polynesian *kumala (compare Rapa Nui kumara, Hawaiian ʻuala, Māori kūmara) may be connected with Quechua and Aymara k'umar ~ k'umara. Adelaar and Muysken assert that the similarity in the word for sweet potato is proof of either incidental contact or sporadic contact between the Central Andes and Polynesia.

=== Natural dispersal theory ===
Some researchers suggest that sweet potatoes might have been present in Polynesia thousands of years before humans arrived there, arriving through avian dispersal or natural rafts. A 2018 genetic analysis of sweet potato collected from the Society Islands by Joseph Banks during the first voyage of James Cook in 1769 found this lineage diverged from South American varieties at least 111,500 years ago. The paper's authors also argued a natural dispersal was likely due to the presence of Ipomoea littoralis and Ipomoea tuboides in the Pacific and Asia — species which are related to American Ipomoea species that have similar seed morphology to sweet potatoes.

=== Regional introductions ===
==== Introduction to Hawaii ====
On the Hawaiian Islands, the earliest archaeological record of sweet potatoes (Hawaiian: ʻuala) is circa 1300 AD, where traces were found on traditional farmlands of Kohala, Hawaii. Sweet potato was likely introduced to the islands at a later point, after initial Polynesian settlers had arrived. Sweet potato was considered to be less superior or valuable compared to another crop on the islands, taro, but it was commonly grown as it could flourish in less favourable growing conditions, and only took between three and six months to mature.

==== Introduction to Easter Island ====
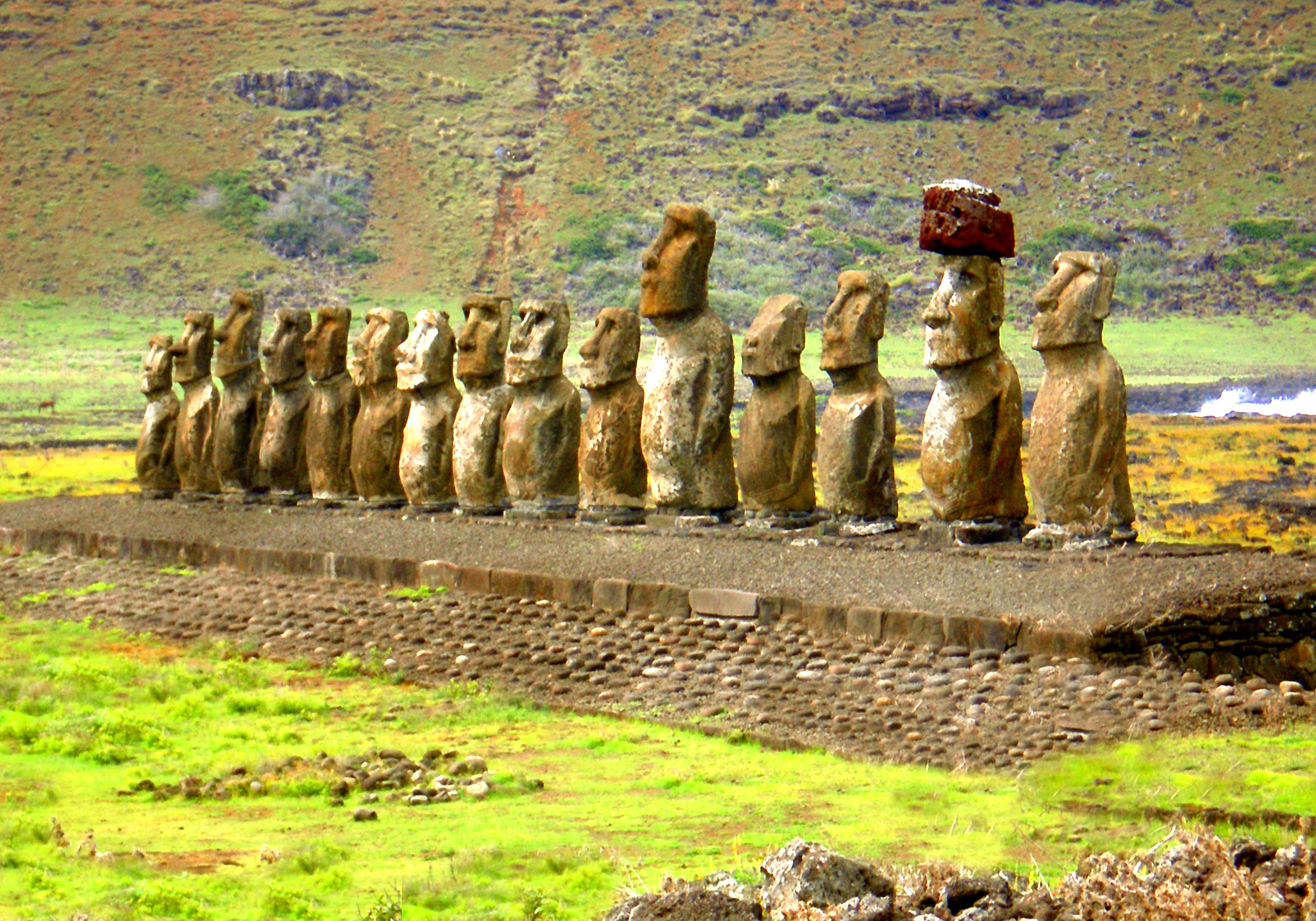
The introduction of sweet potato to Easter Island may have led to the construction of ahu platforms and moai statues (pictured).

Sweet potato (Rapa Nui: kumara) was introduced to Easter Island (Rapa Nui) around 1200–1300 AD. The crop, due to its drought-resistant nature, replaced yam and taro, becoming the staple food on the island and grown on 1/10th of the total land on the island. A traditional Rapa Nui legend involves Hotu Matuꞌa, the legendary first settler of Rapa Nui, travelling to the island and planting sweet potato, yam and bottle gourds near Orongo.

It has been hypothesised that the introduction of sweet potato to the island directly led to the construction of ahu platforms and moai statues, as the large harvests would have meant the island's inhabitants were able to dedicate more time to activities other than subsistence farming. The introduction of sweet potato to the island may have also led to the deforestation of Easter Island, as burnt palm forest was a source of nutrients necessary for the growth of sweet potatoes in nutrient-poor soil.

==== Introduction to New Zealand ====
Sweet potato (standard Māori: kūmara, Southern Māori dialects: kūmera) is a traditional crop for Māori. Archaeological evidence suggests that kūmara arrived in New Zealand after the original Polynesian voyagers had settled in New Zealand, likely sometime between 1300 and 1400. Lack of archaeological evidence on the abandoned Māori settlements on Raoul Island and Norfolk Island implies kūmara was not available in the early 1300s. Oral histories tell of a return voyage to central Polynesia to collect the plant for use in New Zealand, but oral histories do not agree on a single voyage or source: the introduction of kūmara is associated with the Aotea, Arawa, Horouta, Kurahaupō, Māhuhu, Māmari, Mātaatua, Tainui and Tokomaru canoes, possibly due to the mana associated with having brought kūmara to New Zealand. One history involves Tūhoe ancestor Toi-kai-rākau, who, after he sailed the Horouta waka to New Zealand, introduced local Māori to dried kūmara (kao). The locals, having loved the vegetable, sailed on the Horouta back to central Polynesia to collect the plant to grow in New Zealand. Ngāti Awa have a similar stories about the Mātaatua waka, that it was sent to bring kūmara supplies to Whakatāne. In Tainui and Te Arawa traditions, kūmara was brought to New Zealand by Whakaotirangi, a woman who carried seeds of important plants on the journey to New Zealand after being kidnapped by the chief Tama-te-kapua, around 1350 AD. Whakaotirangi experimented with ways to adapt growing kūmara in the colder climate, where they would develop an unpleasant sour taste when exposed to frost. Another history involves Marama, the junior wife of Hoturoa aboard the Tainui waka. She brought kūmara plants with her on her journey, but, when she arrived in Aotearoa, she was unfaithful to Hoturoa with a slave. As punishment, her kūmara plants turned into pōhue (Calystegia sepium) – a traditional weed of kūmara farms.

In 1880, botanist and missionary William Colenso listed 48 varieties grown in Northland, Hawke's Bay and the East Coast. These traditional varieties came in a variety of colours (red, purple and white), shapes (some cylindrical) and differing rough/smooth textures. Northland Māori described a red-fleshed, red-skinned variety called paikaraka as the oldest variety of kūmara to Colenso, while Te Arawa iwi sources in the 1940s called toroa-māhoe and hutihuti the oldest varieties. Kūmara does not seed in New Zealand due to the climate, meaning mutations in buds and careful cultivation of these plants likely led to the new varieties. A 1955–1959 survey of Māori farmers identified four cultivars considered to be pre-European: taputini and houhere (grown in Northland), and two closely related varieties grown across the North Island: rekamaroa and hutihuti (rekamaroa and hutihuti were commonly grown in Māori home gardens until the 1940s). A 1997 DNA analysis of these varieties confirmed that taputini, rekamaroa and hutihuti are all pre-European (houhere was not tested in the study). Other traditional cultivars outside of this list still exist, such as parapara (a variety used for medicinal reasons to feed the elderly, babies and the unwell), paukena (used to make kūmara kao), poporo, rekarawa and romanawa.

== Cultivation and use ==
=== Hawaii ===
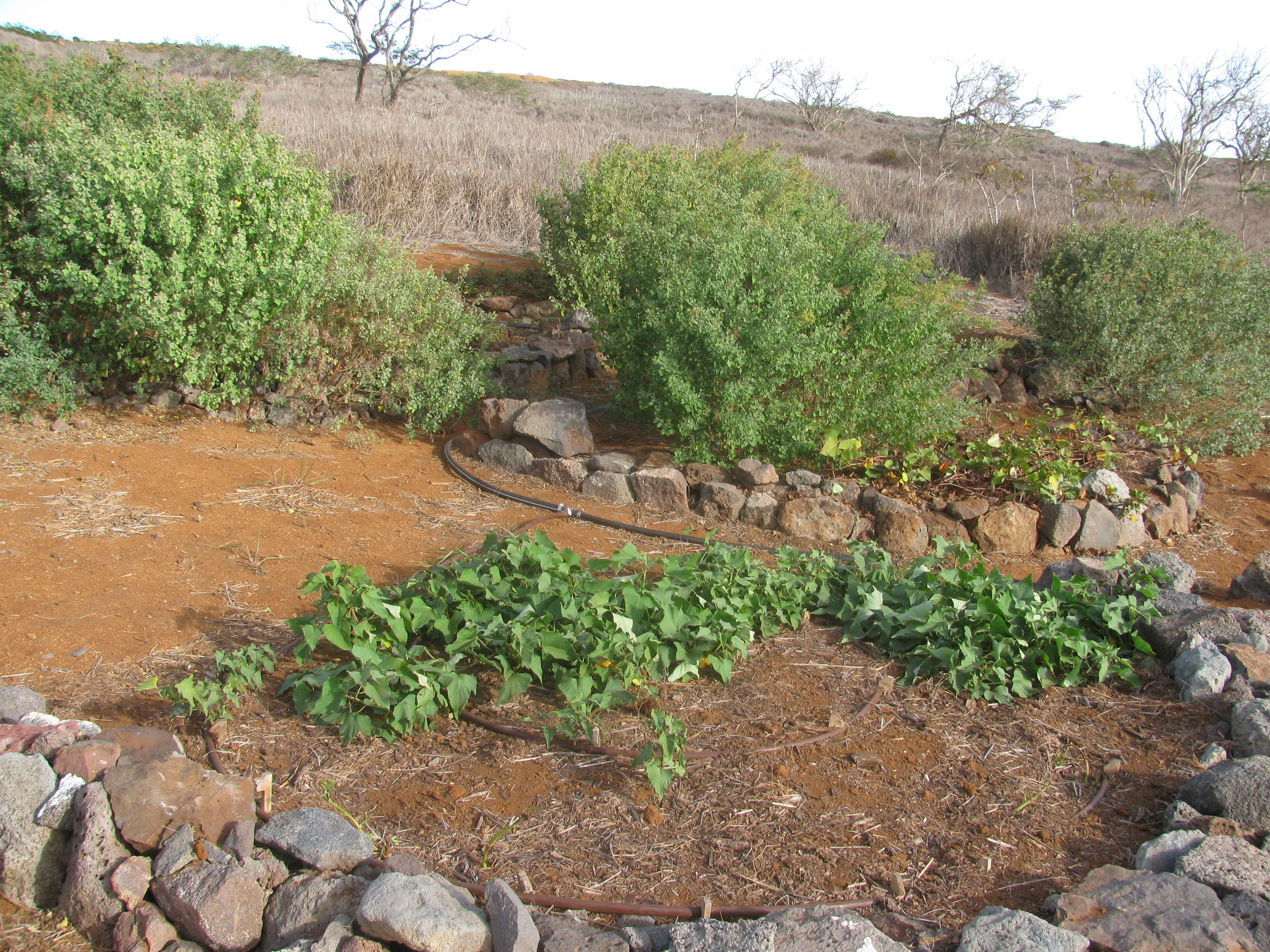
A traditional ʻuala garden on Kahoolawe in the Hawaiian Islands

Sweet potato on the Hawaiian islands was typically grown in makaili (stony alluvial soils), and in arid/coastal areas. Many māla (cultivations) were planted as a mix of sugarcane (kō) and sweet potato, with sugarcane planted in rows alongside the stone field walls to act as a windbreak for the sweet potato crop planted in between these rows. Often sweet potato was planted in mounds, with the soil mulched with a mix of rocks and plants. Rats preyed on the sweet potato crops during the Hawaiian rainy season (November to March), while periodic outbreaks of Sphingidae moth caterpillars, cutworms and weevils would greatly damage crops. Sweet potato is associated with the new year festival of Makahiki, where the first fruits of the harvest (kāmalui hou) were offered to the gods, typically sweet potatoes and taro.

By the mid-1800s, traditional rain-fed sweet potato cultivation in Hawaii ceased due to depopulation and damage caused by introduced Western grazing animals. Since the early 1900s, pests were introduced to the islands which impacted farmers' abilities to grow sweet potato in Hawaii, such as Cylas formicarius (the sweet potato weevil) and Omphisa anastomosalis (the sweet potato vine borer). This is to the degree that farmers often refrain from planting sweet potato in the same location for two successive seasons. Sweet potato became a major export crop for Hawaii in the 20th century, although since the 1990s the number of plantations has decreased.

There are over 300 different names for traditional sweet potato varieties, with many names likely being synonyms for the same varieties. Some of the most commonly cited in ethnographies and traditional sources include apo, huamoa, kawelo, likolehua and uahi-a-pele. Huamoa is a variety described as egg-like, being round, with a white skin and a yellow flesh. Most sweet potatoes produced in Hawaii are modern imported varieties, such as the Okinawa purple variety, however several heritage cultivars that are still grown are likely pre-European cultivars, including lanikeha, mohihi and purple kahanu.

=== Easter Island ===
Sweet potato planting typically occurs twice a year, from January to April and August to September. Lithic mulching (mixing rocks into fertile soil) was used by traditional Rapa Nui gardeners in order to retain moisture in sweet potato plantations. Plants are typically grown from grafts taken from mature plants, and take from between 120 and 180 days to mature. The end of the initial stage involves piling earth on top of the plants. Sweet potato was not often stored on Rapa Nui, instead typically eaten directly after harvesting. Occasionally sweet potatoes were stored for festivals or ceremonies, by drying large tubers in the sun, then burying them in soil for up to one month. Sweet potatoes were eaten raw or cooked. The young leaves of the sweet potato are also eaten.

=== New Zealand ===
==== Traditional cultivation ====
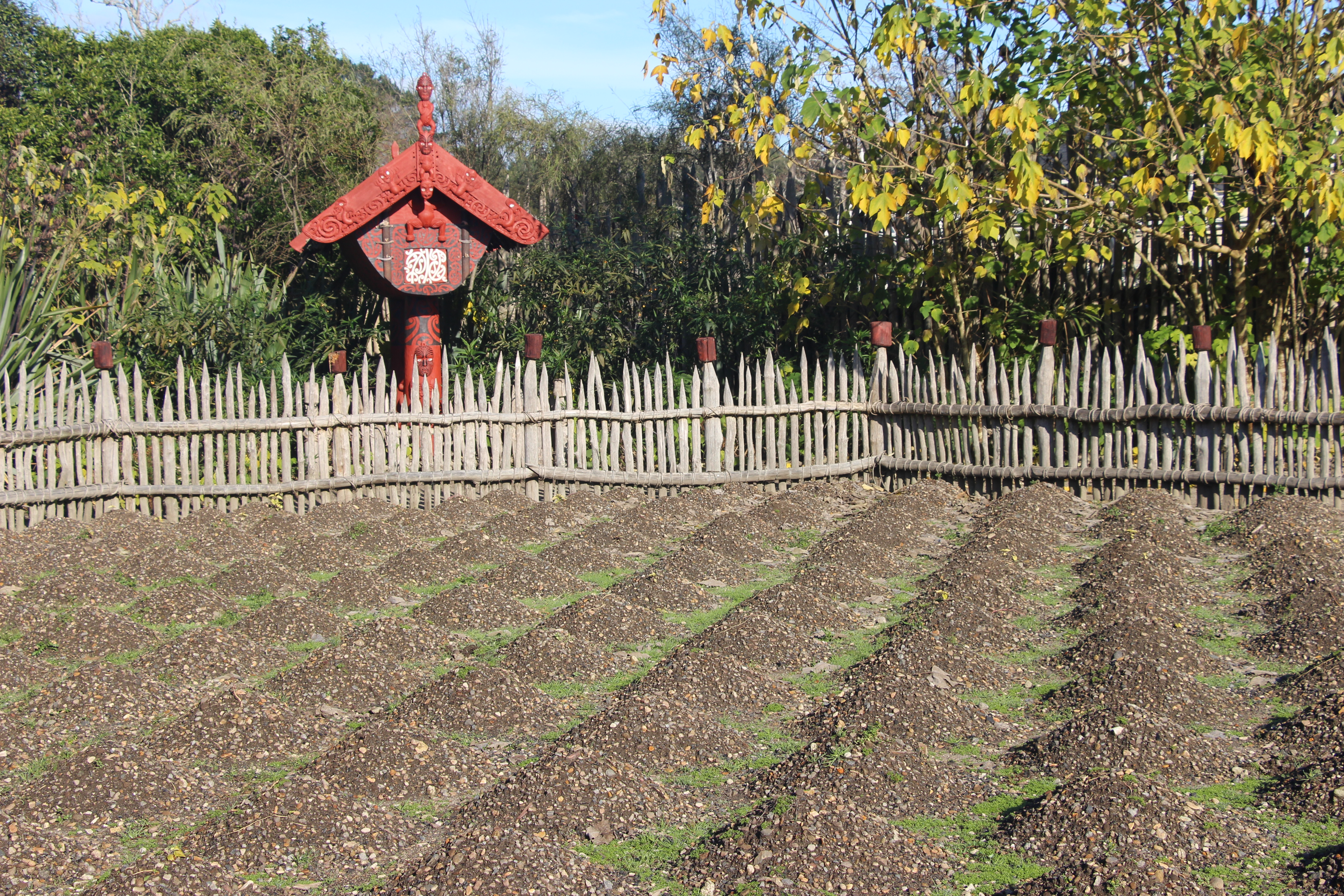
Rows of puke (earth mounds) where kūmara will be planted at Te Parapara in the Hamilton Gardens, Waikato

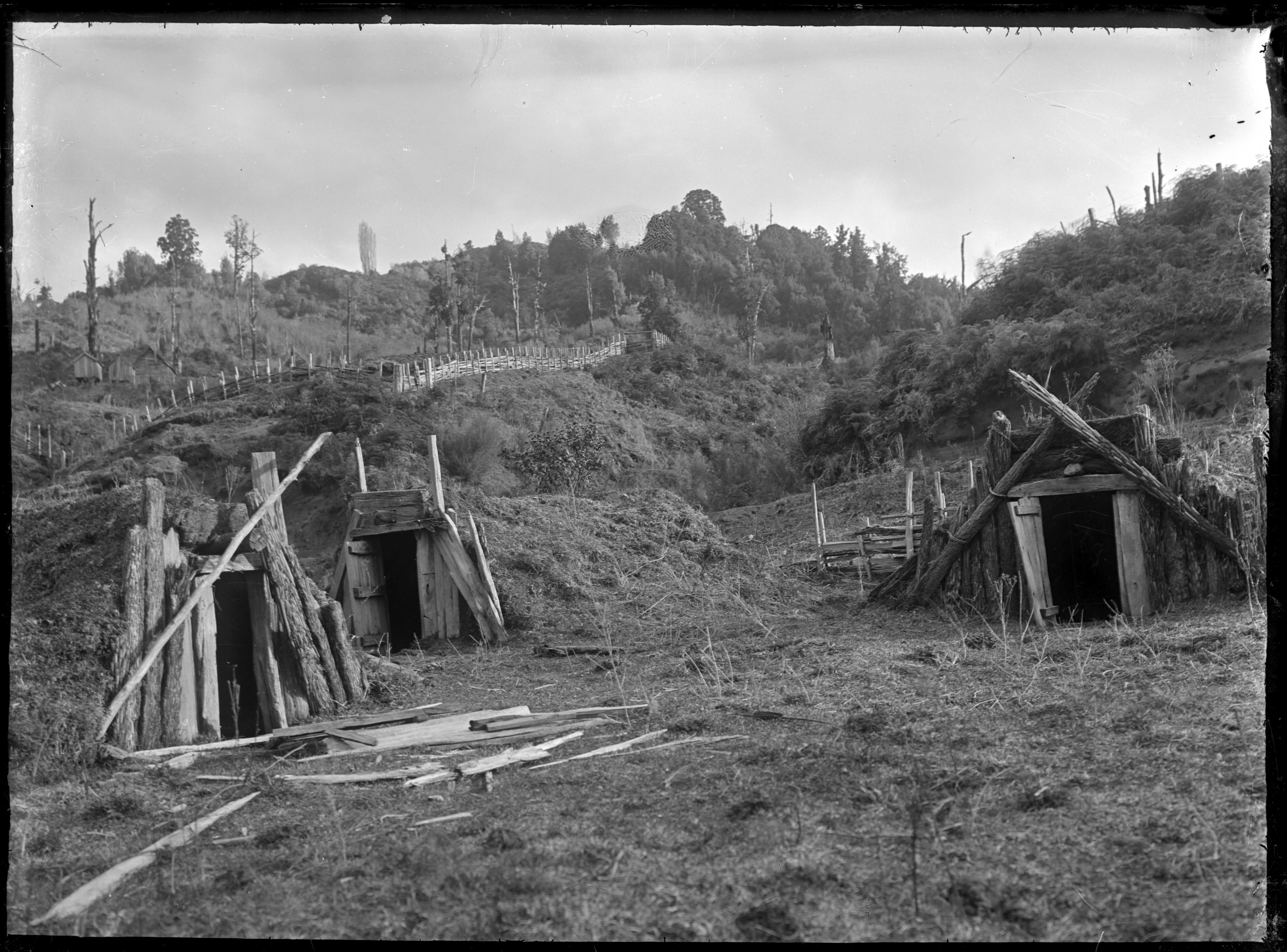
Rua kūmara, traditional sweet potato storages, in Ruatahuna, New Zealand (pictured in the 1930s)

Māori adapted kūmara cultivation methods for New Zealand, learning to grow new plants from tubers instead of from shoots, and adapting to a seasonal climate by storing sweet potato over winter and growing during the summer. Kūmara and hue (Lagenaria siceraria, or bottle gourds) could be cultivated on about 45% of New Zealand, much greater than other traditional Polynesian crops brought to the islands, such as taro (Colocasia esculenta) and aute (the paper mulberry tree). South of Taranaki and Hawke's Bay, kūmara was the dominant Polynesian crop plant (hue and taro were more commonly grown further north). In the South Island, kūmara was typically grown as far south as Banks Peninsula. Māori managed to grow kūmara as far south as Otago in the 1450s, however cultivation south of Canterbury ceased before European contact, possibly due to Little Ice Age-related climate changes, or political upheaval. Kūmara roots tend to develop fungal rot when daily temperatures fall below 10 °C, however this may have been mitigated by the use of internal fires and heated rocks.

In spring, the flowering of the kōwhai tree and the call of the migratory pīpīwharauroa (shining bronze cuckoo) signalled when kūmara fields needed to be prepared, but planting time varied annually, depending on whether a cold winter was predicted during Matariki. The positions of the stars and when the kūmara leaves beginning to wither in autumn was a sign of hauhakenga, or the time to harvest the crop. Māra kūmara (sweet potato gardens) consisted of puke (soil mounds) arranged in rows or a quincunx pattern of plants. These gardens could only be used for a limited time before soil nutrients became too depleted. Māori used crop rotation to grow kūmara, where a māra kūmara would be used for 2–3 years before being burnt and left to fallow. However, crop rotation was much more difficult compared to other parts of Polynesia, due to tangled Pteridium esculentum (rarauhe, or bracken ferns) taking over the fallowing croplands. Light sandy loam or volcanic soils were the best suited for growing kūmara. Māra kūmara are typically found on slanted, north-facing land, which attracts less moisture and is more sheltered from cold southerly winds. Gardens would also placed facing north or north-east as this was the direction of Hawaiki (the mythical Māori homeland). Layers of beach sand, cut grass and gravel were sometimes used for planting kūmara in August, with the insulation helping the tubers sprout faster. Gravel was sometimes spread under kūmara leaves to protect the plant, or blended into earth to loosen hard soils.

Plants were often susceptible to being eaten by the Australasian swamphen (pūkeko) and caterpillars of Agrius convolvuli (hīhue, or the convolvulus hawk-moth). To combat this, fences were built around gardens to keep out pūkeko, while the caterpillars were either removed by hand, smoked out using kauri gum or kawakawa leaves, or by encouraging tamed seagulls to eat them. Younger plants were often eaten by kiore (the Polynesian rat), which were scared off by older men using shell rattles.

After harvesting, the tubers were placed in rua kūmara; subterranean pits with rectangular roofs, sterilised with fire and sealed with small wooden doors to keep out pests. These became common across Aotearoa after 1500 AD, and control over rua kūmara was an important social distinction in classical Maori society. Rua kūmara were located on slopes or other places with good drainage. Kūmara were placed on shelves cut into the walls of the pit, and regularly checked for rot and rotated to ensure they stayed dry. Rua kūmara were only packed on dry, sunny days. The pits were typically reused, with new posts and roofs added to old structures as they degraded. However, in the Bay of Plenty, kūmara pits were often used for single seasons and backfilled afterwards, due to the soft tephra soil.

Traditional eating methods include sun-drying smaller tubers (kao), mashed (kōmahimahi), grated (roroi kūmara), cooked in a hāngī, roasted and eaten with liquid from kina, or boiled. Kōtero is a fermented kūmara, often kūmara that had started to rot during storage, which has a shrivelled appearance but remains sweet.

Since 2010, kūmara have been grown using traditional methods at a garden called Te Parapara in the Hamilton Gardens.

===== Social and religious significance =====
The origins of the kūmara are also explained through Māori cosmological traditions. Rongo-māui (a star in the constellation of Lyra), the husband of Pani-Tinaku and the younger brother of Whānui (the star Vega). Pani-tinaku's nephews taunt Rongo-māui for not fishing and providing food for his family. Rongo-māui decides to ascend to the heavens, and asked Whānui for some kūmara from the heavens. He refused, but Rongo-māui hid and stole kūmara. Rongo-māui impregnates his wife, and Pani-tinaku gives birth to the earthly form of kūmara: nehutai, pātea, waihā, pio, matatū, pāuārangi, toroa-māhoe, anurangi, and aka-kura (all traditional varieties of kūmara). She is asked by Rongo-māui to cook the kūmara, in order to remove the heavenly tapu from the food. Pani-tinaku's nephew Māui discovers the source for these kūmara, leading Pani-tinaku to flee to the underworld. Her youngest daughter, Hine-mata-iti, became the kiore (the Polynesian rat who steals kūmara). Whānui discovers men gardening kūmara, and realises Rongo-māui stole the kūmara, and as retribution Whānui creates anuhe, toronū and moko, who every year rain down as the hawk-moth caterpillars who attack the kūmara.

Kūmara became associated with Rongo-mā-Tāne, the god (atua) of agriculture and peace. Small statues (taumata atua) representing Rongo and atua kiato (carved pegs) were placed alongside kūmara fields, sometimes decorated with kits made of feathers. Due to the importance of the kūmara crop to Māori, planting was associated with rituals, with the annual planting and harvest of kūmara being a reenactment of the story of Rongo-māui. The first day of planting involved planters arriving early in the morning, and a tohunga would give a karakia to Rongo-mā-Tāne, and then plant sacred kūmara separate from the main fields. After the karakia, men would use kō to till the fields, followed by women and children, who would use patupatu and timo to break up the soil further. Once planting had been finished, tapu was placed on the fields, so only the weeders and pest removers would be allowed to be in the fields. During harvest time, the first kūmara of the season were offered to atua at a ceremony. After the kūmara harvest, elaborate harvest feasts were held (known as hākari or kaihaukai). During South Island kaihaukai, different preserved cultivars of kūmara were exchanged between hapū.

Areas best suited to grow kūmara (light, sandy soils, in frost free north-facing areas) were often fought over between iwi. During the Classic period of Māori history when agriculture became more common, the areas where kūmara could grow the most successfully were often associated with more pā and greater population density.

==== Modern cultivation ====
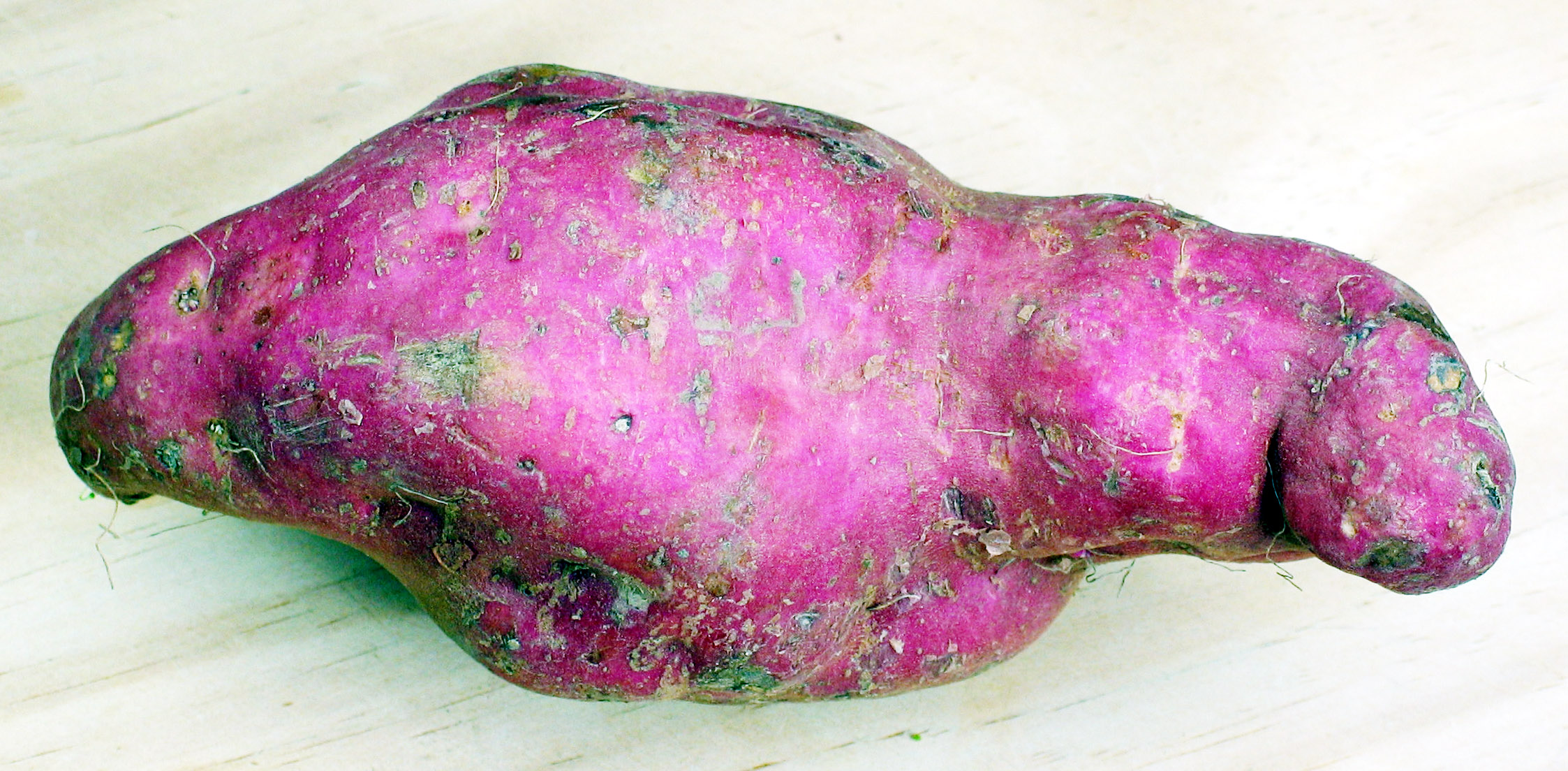
Owairaka Red, a variety created by Fay and Joe Gock in the 1950s, is the most commonly grown cultivar of sweet potato in New Zealand.

Kūmara became a less important crop with the introduction of the potato in the 1780s by Western sailors. The potato could grow in colder climates, and was considered noa (not tapu, or needing sacred rituals), so could be grown by women or slaves. Traditional cultivars of kūmara continued to be grown, but were mostly supplanted in the 1800s by American varieties that had been brought on Western whaling ships. Around 1819, an American whaler introduced a North American variety that was larger than traditional ones to Bay of Plenty Māori; this variety became known as the merikana (American). The waina (vine) variety was introduced in the 1850s by a whaler who had come from Rarotonga. This variety was propagated by vine cuttings, instead of the traditional Māori method of root planting (and is the source of the variety's name).

Varieties descended from the ones brought on whaling ships formed the basis of the modern commercial crop. From 1947 into the 1950s, black rot (Ceratocystis fimbriata) began to affect kūmara crops in the northern North Island. Chinese New Zealand gardeners Fay Gock and Joe Gock developed a disease-resistant variety of kūmara from a mutant form of waina at their market garden near the Pukaki Inlet in Māngere in the 1950s. The new variety, called Owairaka Red, was released commercially in 1954. The Gocks donated stock of the new variety, called Owairaka Red, to farms in New Zealand's main kūmara-growing area around Dargaville and Ruawai in the 1960s, saving the crop from loss to black rot.

In the 21st century, most commercial kūmara is grown in Northland. In 2020, there was 1,600 hectares (4,000 acres) of land planted in kūmara, producing 24,000 tonnes annually. The three main varieties are Owairaka Red, Toka Toka Gold and Beauregard (orange), with Owairaka Red being the most common. Toka Toka Gold was introduced by the Ministry of Agriculture and Fisheries in the 1960s from an unknown source, and was made commercially available in 1972. It is named after the Tokatoka peak near Dargaville. Beauregard, developed at Louisiana State University in 1987, was introduced to New Zealand from the US in 1991. Two new varieties were released commercially by Plant & Food Research in 2014: Purple Dawn (purple skin and purple flesh), and Orange Sunset (purple skin with orange and purple flesh).

== See also ==
- Domesticated plants and animals of Austronesia
