= List of sweet potato cultivars =

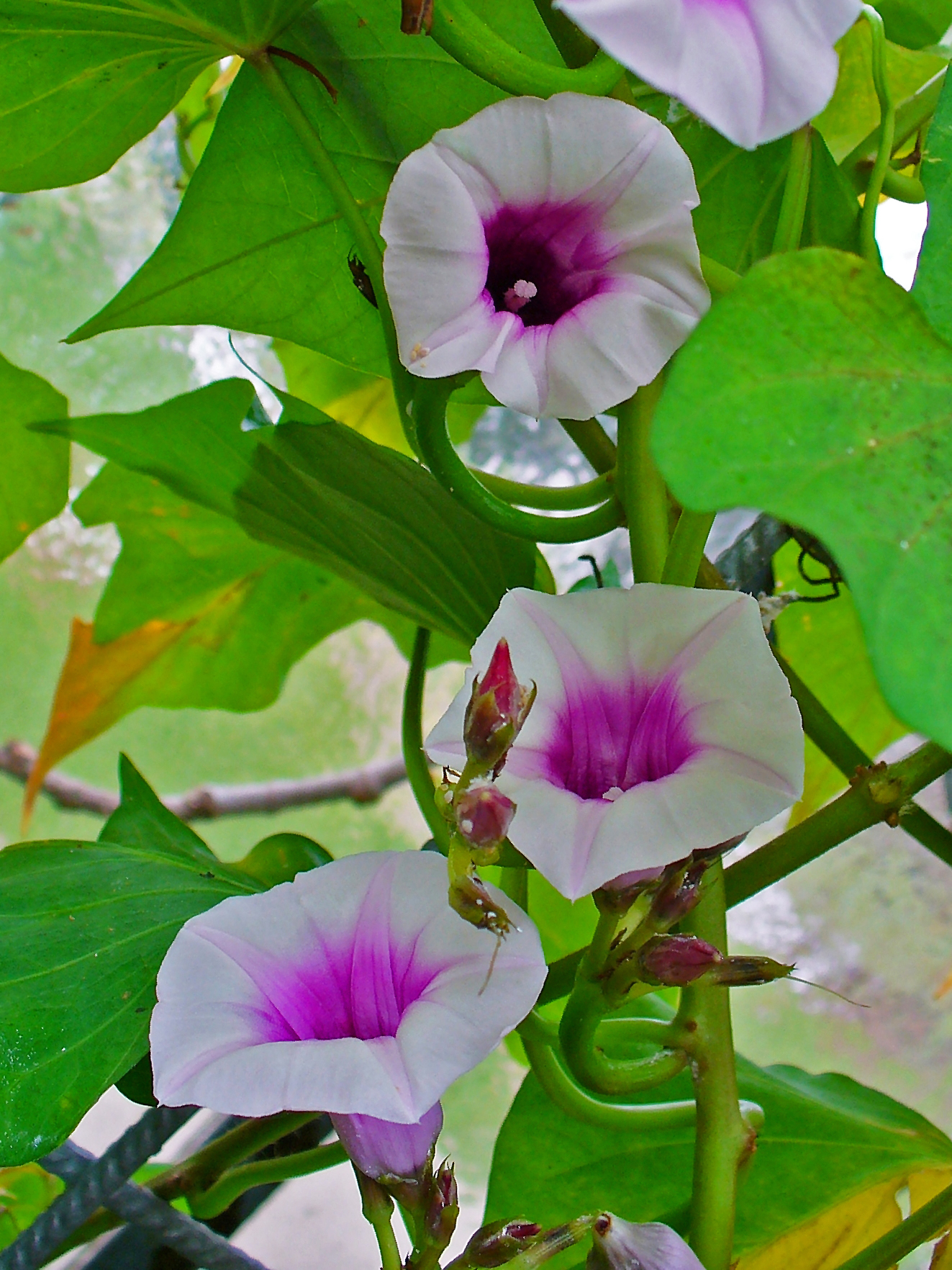
A sweet potato plant in bloom at the Karlsruhe Institute of Technology botanical garden

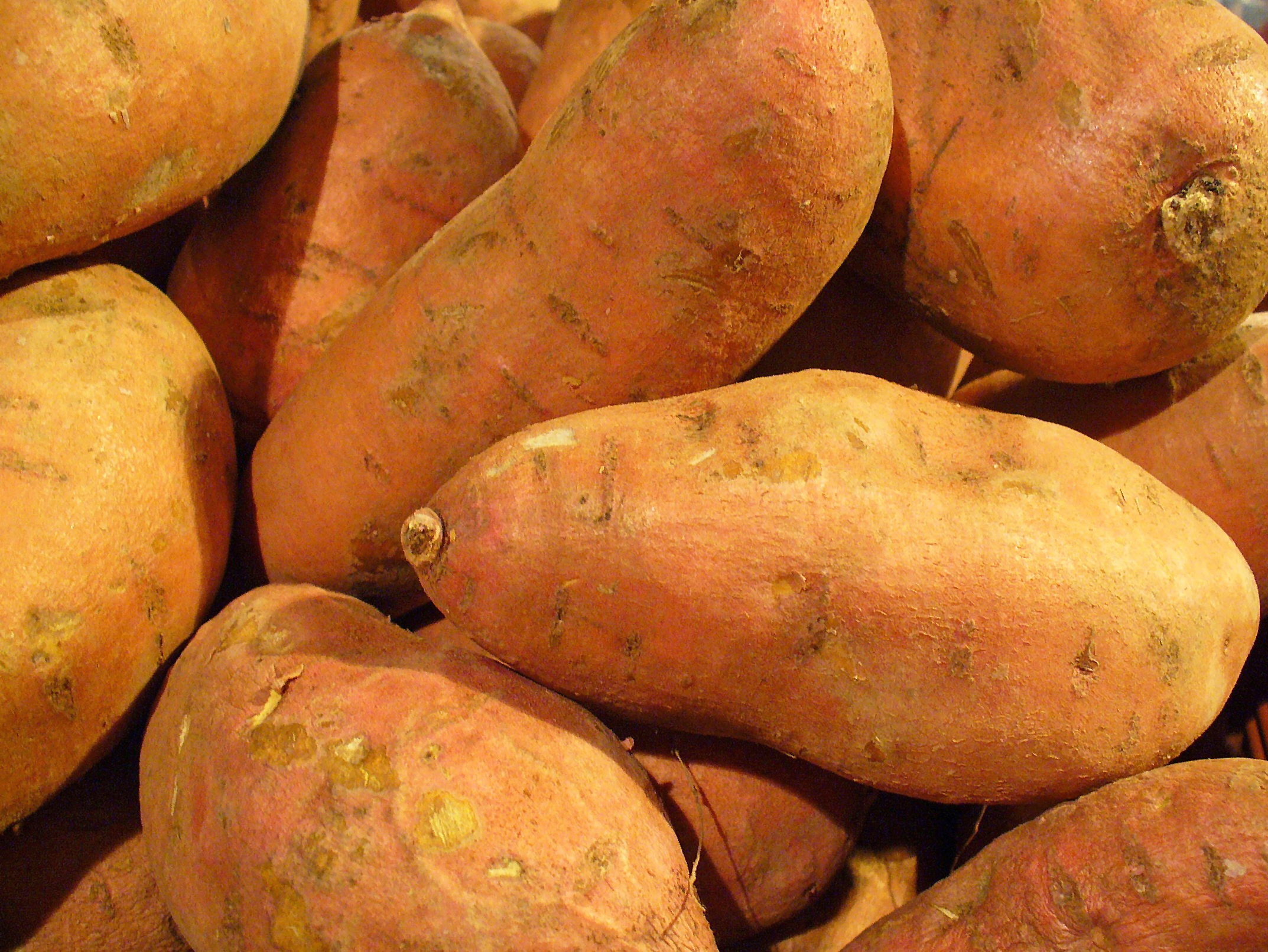
Edible sweet potato roots photographed in Karlsruhe, Germany

This list of sweet potato cultivars provides some information about varieties and cultivars of sweet potato (Ipomoea batatas). The sweet potato was first domesticated in the Americas more than 5,000 years ago. As of 2013, there are approximately 7,000 sweet potato cultivars. People grow sweet potato in many parts of the world, including New Zealand, Australia, the Philippines, Japan, Hawaii, China, and North America. However, sweet potato is not widely cultivated in Europe.

People breed sweet potatoes mainly either for food (their nutritious storage roots) or for their attractive vines. (The variety 'Vardaman' is grown for both.) The first table below lists sweet potato cultivars grown for their edible roots; the second table lists cultivars bred as ornamental vines. In the first table, the Parentage column briefly explains how the sweet potato cultivar was bred. Sweet potato plants with desirable traits are selectively bred to produce new cultivars.

Sweet potato cultivars differ in many ways. One way people compare them is by the size, shape, and color of the roots. The more orange the flesh of a sweet potato root is, the more nutritious carotene it has. (Humans metabolize carotene into vitamin A.) The skin of a sweet potato root is a different color than the flesh. The biological word for the outer skin is epidermis; the flesh is called the pith or medulla. The first table below has a general description of the color of the root's flesh and skin.

In the mid-20th century, sweet potato growers in the Southern United States began marketing orange-fleshed sweet potatoes as "yams", in an attempt to differentiate them from pale-fleshed sweet potatoes. Even though these growers called their products yams, true yams are significantly different. All sweet potatoes are variations of one species: I. batatas. Yams are any of various tropical species of the genus Dioscorea. A yam tuber is starchier, dryer, and often larger than the storage root of a sweet potato, and the skin is more coarse. This list does not include yams.

== Cultivars bred for edible roots ==
Many of the sweet potato cultivars below were bred at agricultural experiment stations. An agricultural experiment station (AES) is a research center where scientists work to increase the quality and quantity of food production. Agricultural experiment stations are usually operated by a government agency and/or a university.

Name	Plant breeder	Parentage	Root skin (epidermis) colour	Root flesh (medulla) colour	Notes	Origin
Acadian	Louisiana State University	L21 × L131	copper	orange		US
Allgold / Okla. 240	Oklahoma State University–Stillwater	Creole × Triumph (Parent 10)	tan	orange		US
Americana	?	?	?	?		?
Apache	USDA (United States Department of Agriculture)	(Yellow Yam 149 × Nancy Hall 42–1) × (Pelican Processor Triumph)	orange	?		US
Australian Canner	Department of Agriculture (Australia)	?	?	?	Adaptation trials/naming by USDA et al.	Australia
Ayamurasaki	?	indigenous	sangria	plum	Also called beniimo	Okinawa
Baker / V 2158	Norfolk, Virginia	Virginian × numbered seedling	?	?		US
Beauregard	Baton Rouge, Louisiana	open-pollinated seedling of L78-21	rose	orange	First cultivated in 1987	US
Bonara	?	?	?	?		?
Campeon	?	?	light red	white	Commonly called boniato (a word for sweet potato in Cuban Spanish)	?
Canbake / G-52-15-1	Georgia Agricultural Experiment Station (AES)	?	?	?		US
Caro-Gold	Clemson College	C317 × Goldrush	bright purple	orange		US
Carolina Bunch	US Vegetable Laboratory (USDA Agricultural Research Service); South Carolina AES	open pollinated seedling of Excel	light copper	deep orange		US
Carolina Nugget	North Carolina State University	HM1-36 × Lakan	rosy	medium orange	First cultivated in 1954	US
Carolina Ruby	North Carolina Agricultural Research Service (NCARS)	open pollinated seedling of Beauregard	dark red to purple-red	dark orange	First cultivated in 1988	US
Caromex	North Carolina State University	NC228 × NC234	dark copper	deep orange	First cultivated in 1971	US
Carver	Tuskegee Institute	Centennial × Jewel	deep rose	deep orange		US
Centennial / L-3-77	Louisiana AES (Baton Rouge, Louisiana)	Unit IPR × Pelican Processor	orange	orange		US
Chipper	?	?	?	?		?
Covington NC98-608	North Carolina State University	?	rose	orange	Smooth skin	US
Cliett Bunch Porto Rico / Georgia Bunch Porto Rico	University of Georgia Coastal Plain Experiment Station (Tifton, Georgia)	mutation from Vining Porto Rico	?	?	Similar to Vining Porto Rico	US
Coastal Red	University of Georgia Coastal Plain Experiment Station (Tifton, Georgia)	open-pollinated seedling from GA-76	red	medium orange	First cultivated in 1978	US
Coppergold	L. A. Sharum (Fort Smith, Arkansas)	selected mutation in Allgold	russet copper	?		US
Cordner	Texas AES and Oklahoma State University	copper	medium orange	?	First cultivated in 1983	US
Creole	?	?	?	?		?
Darby	Louisiana AES (Baton Rouge, Louisiana)	open pollinated seedling of L 83-523	dark rose	orange	Purple stems	US
Don Juan	Puerto Rico AES (Río Piedras, Puerto Rico)	selected from native stock	?	?		Puerto Rico
Earlyport	Louisiana AES (Baton Rouge, Louisiana)	(Mameyita × seedling L-4-6) × (seedling L-5 × Triumph)	copper	orange	Similar to Porto Rico	US
Earlysweet / T-3	University of Georgia Coastal Plain Experiment Station (Tifton, Georgia)	Porto Rico × unnamed breeding lines	light-skinned	deep orange		US
Eureka	Louisiana State University AES; University of California AES	L9-163 × LO-132	copper	orange		US
Evangeline	Louisiana	?	rose	orange		US
Excel	USDA and the South Carolina AES	open-pollinated seedling of Regal polycrossed in 1981 to 29 other parental selections	light copper	orange	Skin color is slightly lighter than that of Jewel	US
GA90-16	Georgia AES; US Vegetable Laboratory (USDA ARS)	?	?	white	Low sugar, low maltose	US
Garnet	?	?	pale copper	brilliant orange	Commonly called "yams" in the United States to distinguish them from O'Henry sweet potatoes	US
Georgia Jet	?	?	purplish red	deep orange		US
Georgia Red / T-6	University of Georgia Coastal Plain Experiment Station (Tifton, Georgia)	Porto Rican crosses	coppery-red skin	?	Similar to Porto Rico	US
Gold Rush	Louisiana AES (Baton Rouge, Louisiana)	(Mameyita × Seedling L4-6) × (Seedling L-5 × Triumph)	light copper	deep orange	Purple stems	US
Golden Belle	Bryce Woods (Rogers, Arkansas)	Nancy Gold mutation	?	golden	Flesh color differs from Nancy Hall.	US
Goldmar	Maryland AES (College Park, Maryland)	Redmar mutation	golden	?	Cultivated in 1973. Similar to Redmar, but different skin color.	US
Grand Asia	?	?	pink	white	Boniato-type similar to 'Japanese'	?
Hannah Sweet	?	?	?	?		?
Hayman White	?	?	tan	cream	An heirloom variety of the Eastern United States	US
Heartogold	Louisiana State University	Mameyita × Yellow Yam	flesh-colored	deep orange		US
Hernandez	Louisiana State University AES	seedling of L70-323	burnt orange	deep orange	First cultivated in 1992	US
HiDry	Clemson University; USDA	fourth-generation, open-pollinated selection from MK-14	white	cream	Cultivated for industrial use	US
Hoolehua Gold	?	?	pale red	orange		?
Hoolehua Red	?	?	red	off-white		?
Hopi / HM-122	USDA Horticultural Field Station (Meridian, Mississippi)	?	?	?		US
Houhere	Māori traditional	pre-European "kumara" type	pink	yellow	Rectangular tubers	New Zealand
Hutihuti	Māori traditional	pre-European "kumara" type	cream	cream	Long, thin, up to 20 roots per plant	New Zealand
Iliua	?	?	?	?		?
Japanese / Oriental	?	?	purplish red	pale	Boniato-type. Comparatively lower moisture.	?
Jersey Orange / Orange Little Stern	Kansas State College; Rutgers University	?	orange-brown	deep orange	Size and shape are similar to that of Jersey Yellow	US
Jersey Red	?	?	?	?	An heirloom variety	US
Jersey Yellow	?	?	golden, buff, or tan	cream to bright yellow	An heirloom variety	US
Jewel	North Carolina State University	?	copper	deep orange	First cultivated in 1970. Commonly called "yams" in the United States to distinguish them from O'Henry sweet potatoes.	US
Kandee / K1716	Kansas State College	La 1946 Cross 17 × 1 (yellow yam × Nancy Hall)	reddish bronze	bright orange		US
Kona B	?	?	pale red to orange-red	light orange		?
Kote Buki	?	?	purplish red	white	Mid-season	?
Lakan / L-0-123	Louisiana AES (Baton Rouge, Louisiana)	(Unit IPR × Pelican. Processor) × (Mameyita × L-4-6)	reddish-bronze to reddish-tan	bright orange		US
Mameyita	?	?	?	?		?
Maryland Golden	?	?	?	?		US
Miguela	?	?	?	?		?
Murasaki	?	?	hybiscus	pale	Low moisture	?
Murff Bush Porto Rico	E. L. Murff (Normangee, Texas)	Porto Rico mutation	copper	orange	First cultivated in 1949. Similar to Porto Rico.	US
Nancy Gold	Kansas State College AES	Nancy Hall mutation	buff-colored	deep-orange	Skin color differs from Nancy Hall	US
Nancy Hall	?	?	tan	yellow		?
Nemagold / Okla. 46	Oklahoma State University–Stillwater	Yellow Jersey (Orlis strain) × Okla. 29	?	?		US
Northern Star	?	?	?	?	Cultivated in Australia	?
Nugget / NC-171	North Carolina AES (Raleigh, North Carolina)	NC-124 × (NC-41 × B5965)	?	?		US
O'Henry	Henry Wayne Bailey [(Vardaman, MS)]	Beauregard mutation	coppery tan	lemon cream	Variant of Beauregard	US
Okla. 46	Oklahoma State University–Stillwater	Okla. 29 × Orlis [Okla. 29-Parent 10 (see Allgold) × L37 (see Red Gold)]	golden russet	orange	Roots and vines are like yellow Jersey or Orlis; shouldered leaves	US
Oklamar / Okla. 52	Oklahoma State University–Stillwater AES	Oklahoma 5 × Australian Canner	purple	salmon		US
Oklamex Red	Oklahoma and New Mexico AES	B 1564 × PI 153655	dark red	salmon	Extremely sweet, moist root; yam-type	US
Onokeo	?	?	violet	ivory		?
Onolena / HES number 14	Vegetable Crops Department, University of Hawaii (Honolulu)	Porto Rico × Nancy Hall	tan	dark orange	Similar to Porto Rico	US
Orange Sunset	Plant & Food Research	?	purple	orange and purple	First cultivated in 2014	New Zealand
Orlis	Kansas State College	mutation from Common Little Stem Jersey	bronze	?	Similar to Little Stem Jersey	US
Owairaka Red	Fay Gock and Joe Gock	waina type	dark red	yellow	As of 2000, the preeminent cultivar of New Zealand (followed by Toka Toka Gold and Beauregard)	New Zealand
Papota	USDA ARS; Tropical Agricultural Research Station	International Institute of Tropical Agr. seedling	white	beige	Turnip-shaped root	US
Parapara	Māori traditional	?	pink	?	Medicinal variety, used to feed babies, the elderly, and the sick	New Zealand
Pelican Processor / L-5 / L-4-5	Louisiana AES (Baton Rouge, Louisiana)	selfed seedling of Americana	cream	light cream		US
Picadita	?	?	purple-red	white	Commonly called boniato (a word for sweet potato in Cuban Spanish)	?
Pope	North Carolina State University	NC 288 × 304	light salmon	medium orange		US
Poporo	Māori traditional	?	purple	purple	traditional sweet and dry variety	New Zealand
Porto Rico 198 / Porto Rican / Puerto Rican	North Carolina	?	rose-pink	orange mottled	First cultivated in 1966	US
Purple Dawn	Plant & Food Research	?	purple	purple	First cultivated in 2014	New Zealand
Purple Heart / Okinawa	Okinawa Island	?	tan	grape	Also cultivated in Hawaii	Japan
Queen Mary / L-126	Louisiana AES (Baton Rouge, Louisiana)	Porto Rico × Nancy Hall	?	?	Similar to Porto Rico	US
Ranger	Louisiana State University	Porto Rico × Nancy Hall	flesh-colored	orange	Similar to Nancy Hall	US
Rapoza	?	?	ivory	purple		?
Rekarawa	Māori traditional	?	white	?	chestnut flavour	New Zealand
Rekamaroa	Māori traditional	pre-European "kumara" type	white	?		New Zealand
Red Diane	?	?	?	?		?
Red Garnet	?	?	deep red to purple	orange		?
Red Jewel	?	?	red	deep orange		?
Red Nancy	Kansas State College	mutation of Nancy Gold	red	orange	Similar to Nancy Gold	US
Redglow	University of Georgia AES; California AES	open pollinated seedling of GA-109	light, purple-red	deep orange		US
Redgold / Okla. 26	Oklahoma State University–Stillwater	Okla. 2 × L37 (seedlings involving Creole, Nancy Hall and Porto Rico)	red	orange		US
Redmar / Md 2416	Maryland AES (College Park, Maryland)	[(K18400 × B6313) × Shoreland × (Virginian × K1846)]	red	?	First cultivated in 1971. Similar to Nemagold	US
Regal	USDA ARS; South Carolina AES (Clemson University); Texas Agricultural Station (Texas A&M University)	seedling of W-99 polycrossed with 29 other parental selections	dark purplish-red	orange to deep orange		US
Resisto	USDA; South Carolina AES; Texas AES	seedling of W-56	reddish-copper	dark orange		US
Rojo Blanco	Tuskegee Institute	Rose Centennial × White Triumph	deep red	milk white		US
Romanawa	Māori traditional	?	gold	yellow/orange		New Zealand
Rose Centennial	?	?	?	?		?
Ruddy	US Vegetable Laboratory (USDA ARS); South Carolina AES	open pollinated seedling of W-119	red skin	orange		US
Scarlet	North Carolina Agricultural Research Service (NCARS)	selected from meristem-tip culture derived clones of Jewel	?	orange		US
Shore Gold	Virginia Tech Experiment Station	open pollinated seedling of L7-177 from the Louisiana breeding program	light copper	bright orange		US
Southern Delite	USDA ARS; Clemson University	an open pollinated seedling of W-99	rose to dark copper	orange	Made publicly available in 1986. Skin color varies with soil type	US
Stokes Purple	Unknown (North Carolina)		purple gray	dark purple	Made publicly available in 2012.	US
Sumor	USDA ARS; United States Vegetable Laboratory; South Carolina AES (Clemson University); Edisto Research and Education Center	open pollinated seedling of W-154	light tan	white to yellow	Comparatively high vitamin C	US
Sunnyside	USDA (Beltsville, Maryland and Louisiana)	(Yellow Yam × Nancy Hall) × (Pelican Processor × Triumph)	?	?		US
Sweet Red	North Carolina State University	open pollinated seedling of NC 258	deep copper-red	deep orange		US
Tango	USDA; Missouri AES (Columbia, Missouri); Sweet Potato Cooperative Group (Beltsville, Maryland)	Nancy Hall × Porto Rico 1-10	?	?		US
Tanhoma	Oklahoma State University–Stillwater AES	selection Australian Canner	?	?		US
Taputini	Māori traditional	pre-European "kumara" type	cream	cream	Long, thin, up to 20 roots per plant	New Zealand
Toka Toka Gold	?	?	gold	white	Became commercially available in 1972	New Zealand
Topaz	Texas AES	open pollinated seedling of W-26	bronze	medium orange		?
Travis	Louisiana AES	polycross with L3-217 as seed parent	rose	deep orange	First cultivated in 1980	US
UPLSP-1	?	?	?	?	Cultivated in the Philippines	?
UPLSP-2	?	?	?	?	Cultivated in the Philippines	?
U.P.R. number 3	Puerto Rico AES (Río Piedras, Puerto Rico)	selected from Mameya; open-pollinated	?	?		Puerto Rico
U.P.R. number 7	Puerto Rico AES (Río Piedras, Puerto Rico)	L-240	?	deep orange		Puerto Rico
Vardaman	?	?	golden	light orange		US
Virginian / V-53	Truck Experiment Station (near Norfolk, Virginia)	Maryland Golden × B-219	purplish-red to copper-red	bright orange		US
VSP-5	?	?	?	?	Cultivated in the Philippines	?
VSP-6	?	?	?	?	Cultivated in the Philippines	?
Waimanalo Red	?	?	red	pearl		?
Waina	?	?	?	?	Vining variety brought to New Zealand in the 1800s	?
White Delite	North Carolina State University	cross between a University of Georgia breeding clone (GA41) and an unknown pollen parent	purplish pink	white	First cultivated in 1979	US
White Triumph	?	?	?	?		?
Whitestar	USDA (Beltsville, Maryland)	cultivar Laupahoehoe (Hawaii)	white	pale		US
Yellow Yam	?	?	?	?		?

== Cultivars bred for ornamental vines ==
Name	Cultivator(s)	Leaf color	Leaf shape	Notes
Black Heart / Ace of Spades / Purple Heart	?	dark purplish with purple veins	heart	
Blackie	?	purple and green blend	?	Darker than Black Heart
Bronze Beauty	?	copper	?	Same leaf shape as Blackie
Copper	?	chartreuse to purple	?	
Freckles	?	green and yellow mottled	?	
Gold Finger	?	lime green	lobed	
Ivory Jewel	?	green and ivory streaked	heart	
Lady Fingers	?	green with purple veins	lobed	
Marguerite / Chartreuse / Sulfur	?	chartreuse	?	
Mini Blackie	?	dark green with purple veins	?	Leaf color is lighter than that of lacinato kale
NCORNSP011MNLC / Illusion® Midnight Lace	?	dark green with purple veins	?	
NCORNSP012EMLC / Illusion® Emerald Lace	?	chartreuse	lobed	
Purple Tuber	?	?	?	
Seki Blakhrt / Chillin™ / Blackberry Heart	?	?	?	
Sidekick Black	?	deep purple	lobed	
Sidekick Lime	?	green	lobed	
Sweet Caroline Bewitched Purple / PP18574	Craig Yencho; Ken Pecota (2006)	dark green to vivid burgundy	?	
Sweet Caroline Bronze / PP15437	Craig Yencho; Ken Pecota; Cindy Pierce (2002)	?	?	
Sweet Caroline Green	?	?	?	
Sweet Caroline Green Yellow	?	?	?	
Sweet Caroline Light Green	?	?	?	
Sweet Caroline Purple	?	?	?	
Sweet Caroline Red	?	?	?	
Sweet Caroline Sweetheart Light Green	?	?	?	
Sweet Caroline Sweetheart Red	?	?	?	
Sweet Georgia Heart Purple	?	?	?	
Terrace Lime	?	?	?	
Tricolor	?	green, white, pink	?	Medium-size leaves
Vardaman	?	?	?	

== See also ==
- Food security
- Lists of cultivars
- Plant breeding
- Staple food
