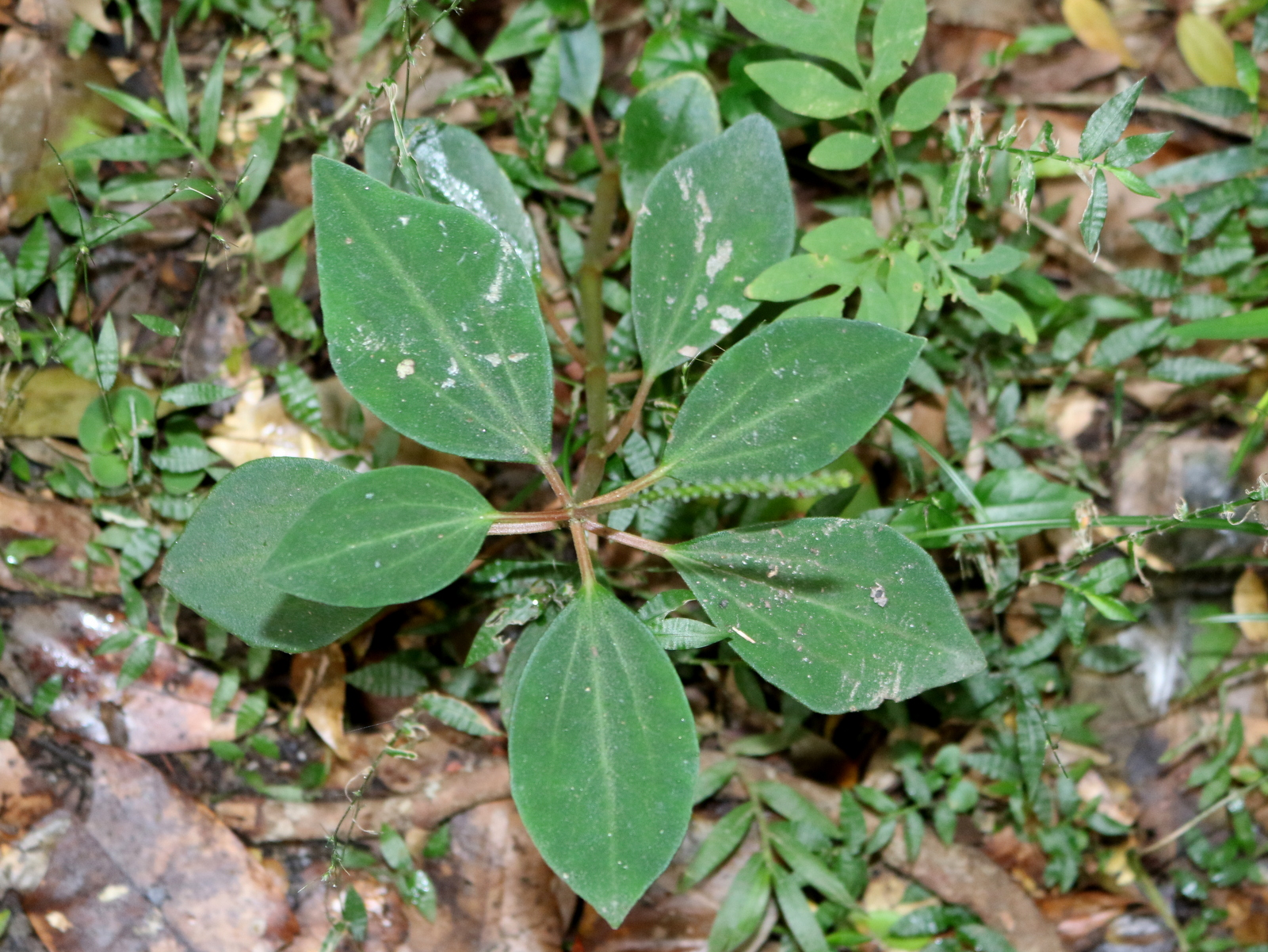
- In Iluka Nature Reserve, Australia

Conservation status
- Least Concern (NCA)

Scientific classification
- Kingdom: Plantae
- Clade: Tracheophytes
- Clade: Angiosperms
- Clade: Magnoliids
- Order: Piperales
- Family: Piperaceae
- Genus: Peperomia
- Species: P. leptostachya

Binomial name
- Peperomia leptostachya Hook. & Arn.

Synonyms
- See text

= Peperomia leptostachya =

Slender peperomia

Species of flowering plant

Peperomia leptostachya, commonly known as slender peperomia or hairy peperomia, is a small succulent herb in the pepper family Piperaceae found in most parts of the Paleotropic floristic kingdom, from Africa through Asia to Australia and the western Pacific.

== Taxonomy ==
The hairy peperomia was first described by the British botanists William Jackson Hooker and George Arnott Walker Arnott in 1832, based on material collected in Hawaii. In 1973 the German botanist Ruprecht Düll reduced this to varietal status, giving it the name Peperomia blanda var. leptostachya which became the accepted name for approximately 40 years. More recently, in 2020, the Belgian botanist and Peperomia authority Guido Mathieu published a paper reverting the plant back to its original name.

=== Synonyms ===
As of 16 April 2024, Plants of the World Online recognises 34 synonyms of P. leptostachya, as follows:

- Peperomia blanda var. leptostachya (Hook. & Arn.) Düll (1973)
- Peperomia arabica Decne. ex Miq. (1843)
- Peperomia arabica var. floribunda Miq. (1843)
- Peperomia arabica var. parvifolia C.DC. (1894)
- Peperomia baueriana var. brisbaniana C.DC. 414 (1869)
- Peperomia bequaertii De Wild. (1920)
- Peperomia blanda var. floribunda (Miq.) H.Huber (1988)
- Peperomia brachytrichoides Engl. (1910)
- Peperomia caffra E.Mey. ex Miq. (1843)
- Peperomia candollei H.St.John (1931)
- Peperomia dindygulensis Miq. (1843)
- Peperomia dindygulensis var. hirsuta Trimen (1895)
- Peperomia esquirolii H.Lév. (1911)
- Peperomia heyneana Wight (1853), sensu auct.
- Peperomia insularum Miq. (1845)
- Peperomia kyimbilana C.DC. (1920)
- Peperomia leptostachya var. attenuapica Yunck. (1937)
- Peperomia leptostachya f. cambodiana C.DC. (1910)
- Peperomia leptostachya var. cambodiana (C.DC.) Merr. (1927)
- Peperomia leptostachya f. carnosior C.DC. (1913)
- Peperomia leptostachya var. laxiflora Miq. (1866)
- Peperomia leptostachya var. macrophylla (Setch.) Yunck. (1937)
- Peperomia leptostachya var. marquesensis F.Br. (1935)
- Peperomia leptostachya var. nodosa Hillebr. (1888)
- Peperomia moerenhoutii C.DC. (1869)
- Peperomia moerenhoutii var. macrophylla Setch. (1926)
- Peperomia moerenhoutii var. mangarevensis F.Br. (1935)
- Peperomia moerenhoutii var. petiolata C.DC. (1869)
- Peperomia recurvata var. philippinensis Miq. (1845)
- Peperomia sui Tsan Piao Lin & S.Y.Lu (1995)
- Peperomia thwaitesii C.DC. (1869)
- Peperomia wightiana Wight (1853), nom. illeg.
- Piper australe A.Cunn. ex Miq. (1845)
- Piper ovalifolium B.Heyne (1832), not validly publ.

== Conservation ==
In Queensland, Australia, this species has been given the status of least concern under the Queensland Government's Nature Conservation Act. As of 16 April 2024, it has not been assessed by the International Union for Conservation of Nature (IUCN).
