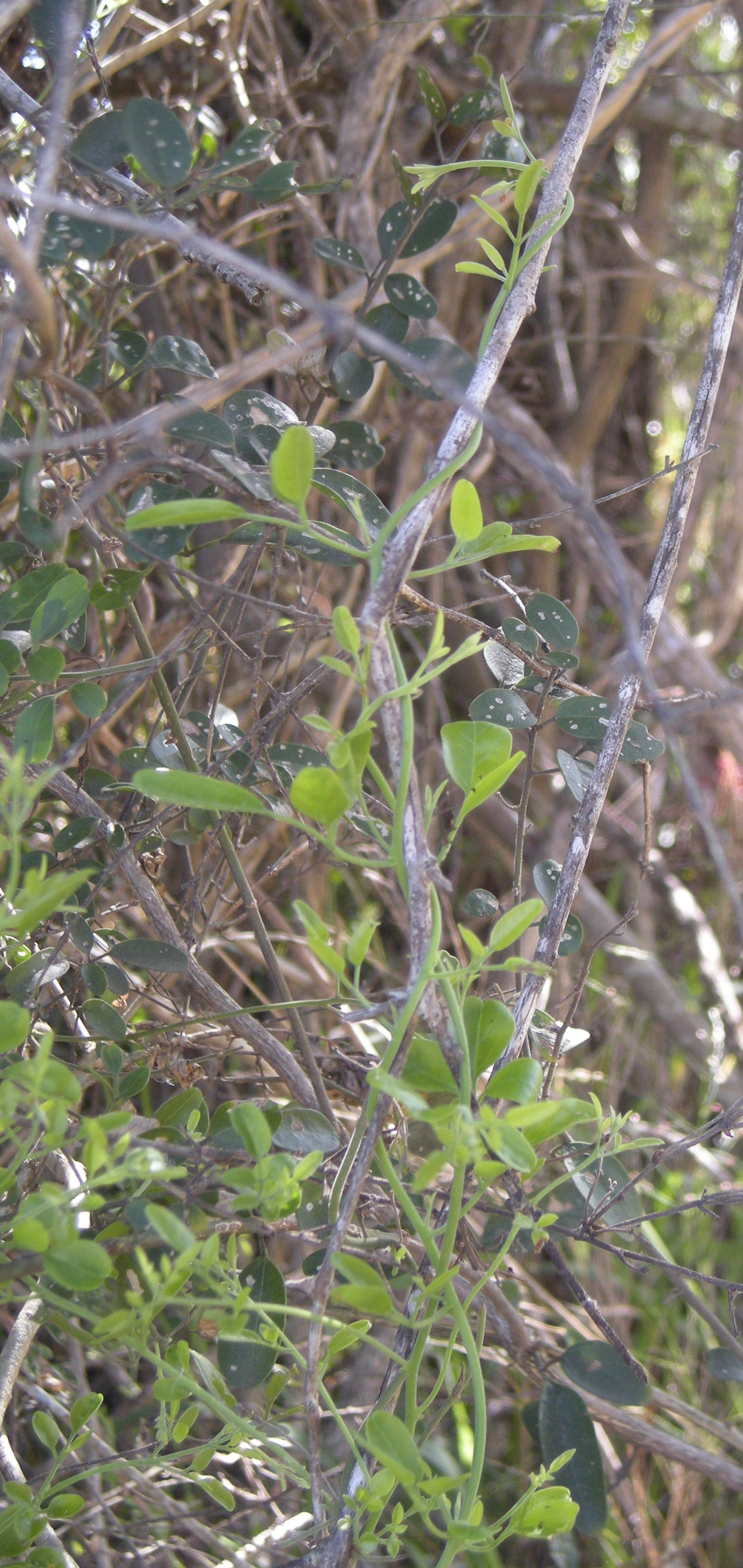
- Jasminum didymum subsp. racemosum.

Scientific classification
- Kingdom: Plantae
- Clade: Embryophytes
- Clade: Tracheophytes
- Clade: Angiosperms
- Clade: Eudicots
- Clade: Asterids
- Order: Lamiales
- Family: Oleaceae
- Genus: Jasminum
- Species: J. didymum

Binomial name
- Jasminum didymum G.Forst.

= Jasminum didymum =

Species of plant

Jasminum didymum is a species of scrambling vine or low shrub. It is native to insular Southeast Asia from Java to the Philippines, as well as Australia (Northern Territory, Norfolk Island, and all states except Tasmania), as well as some islands in the Pacific (New Guinea, Solomon Islands, Fiji, Niue, New Caledonia and the Society Islands). Jasminum didymum occurs naturally in habitats from rainforests to arid and semi-arid shrublands.

== Subspecies ==
Jasminum didymum is highly variable in leaf shape and habit and is subdivided into 3 subspecies based on these characteristics:

- Jasminum didymum subsp. didymum - wide natural distribution
- Jasminum didymum subsp. lineare (R.Br.) P.S.Green - Mainland Australia
- Jasminum didymum subsp. racemosum (F.Muell.) P.S.Green - Queensland only

== Etymology ==
'Jasminum' is a Latinized form of the Arabic word, 'yasemin' for sweetly scented plants.

== Images ==
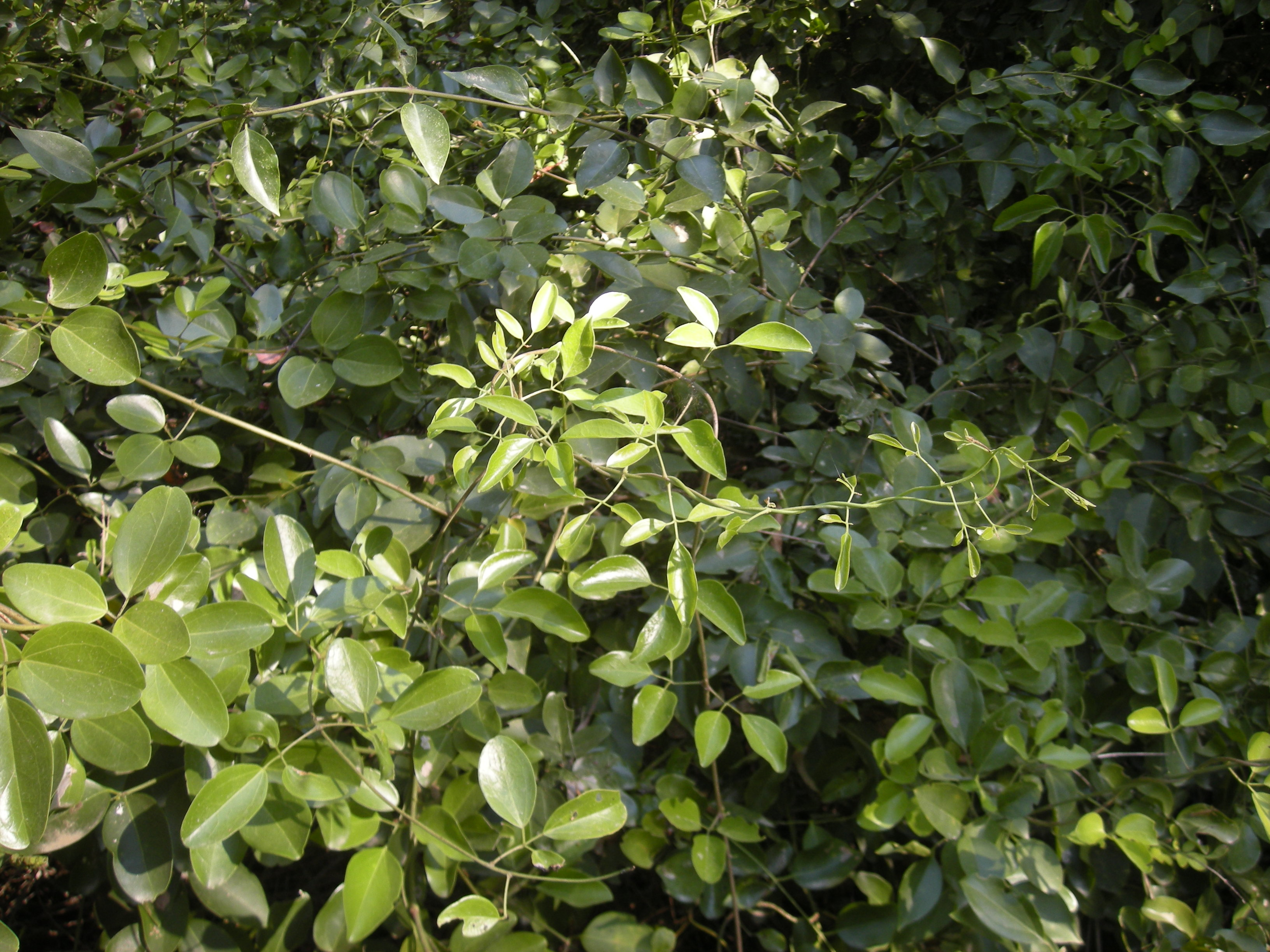
J. didymum subsp. didymum foliage.

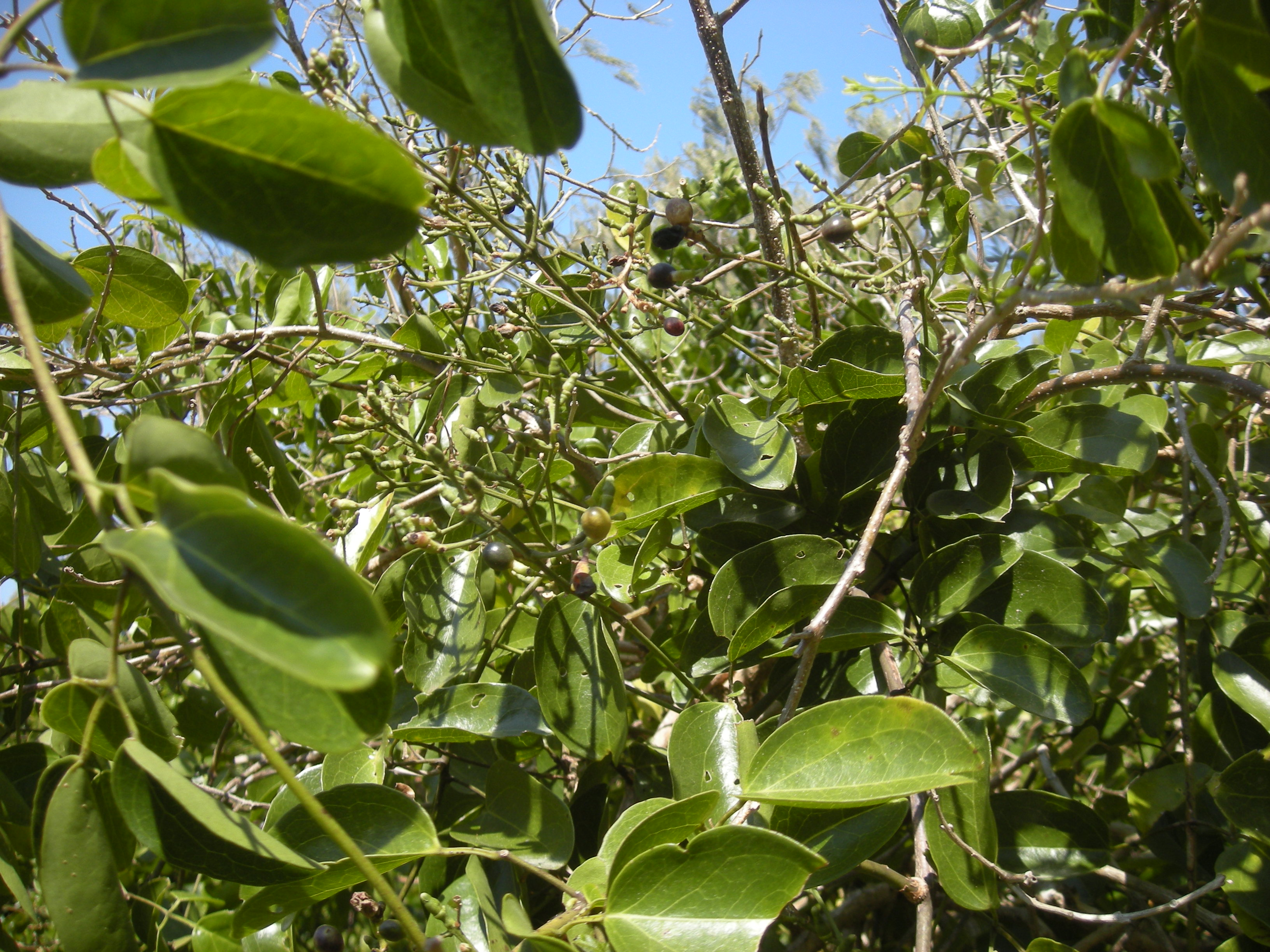
J. didymum subsp. didymum fruit.

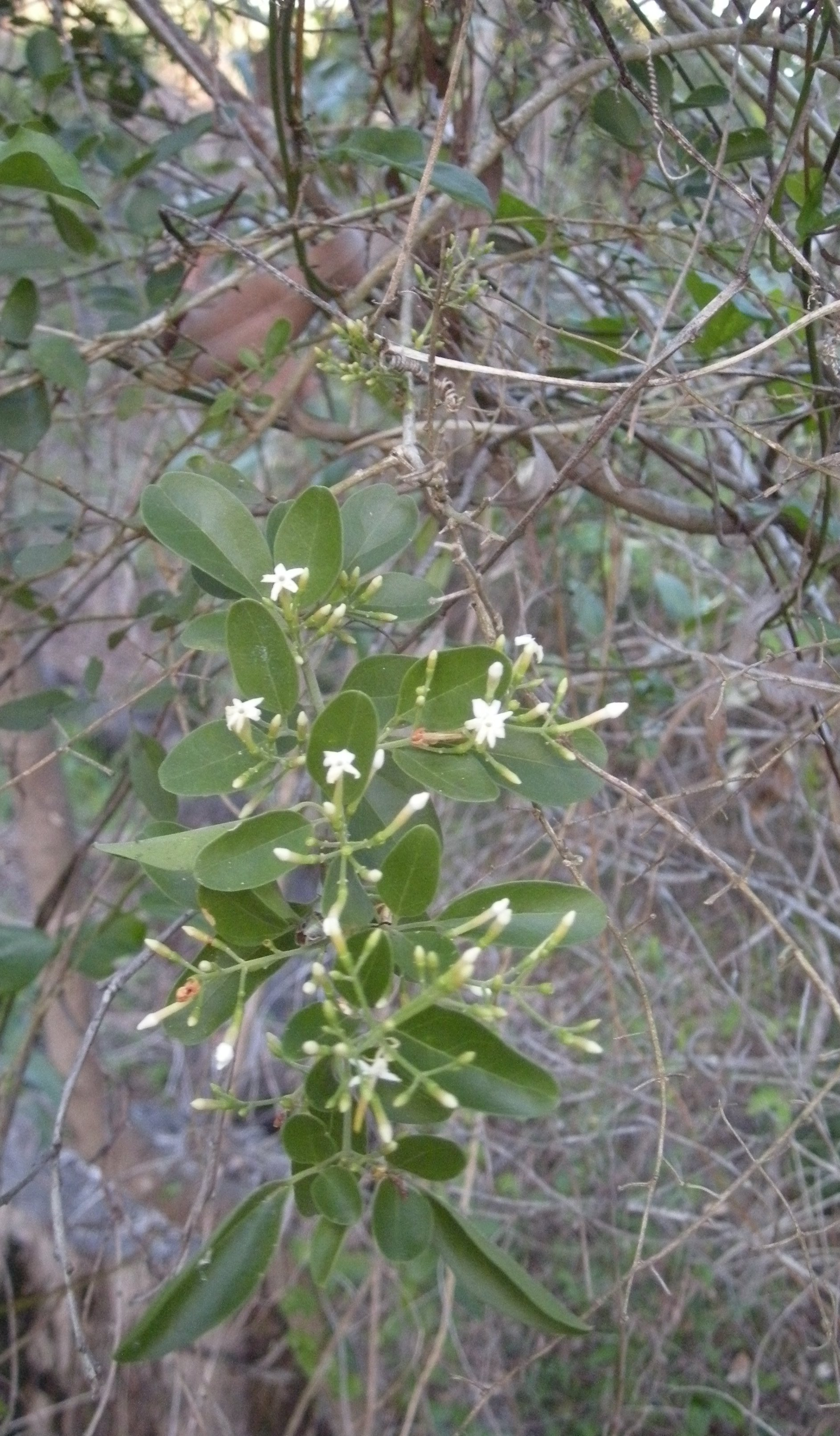
Jasminum didymym ssp. racemosum flowers

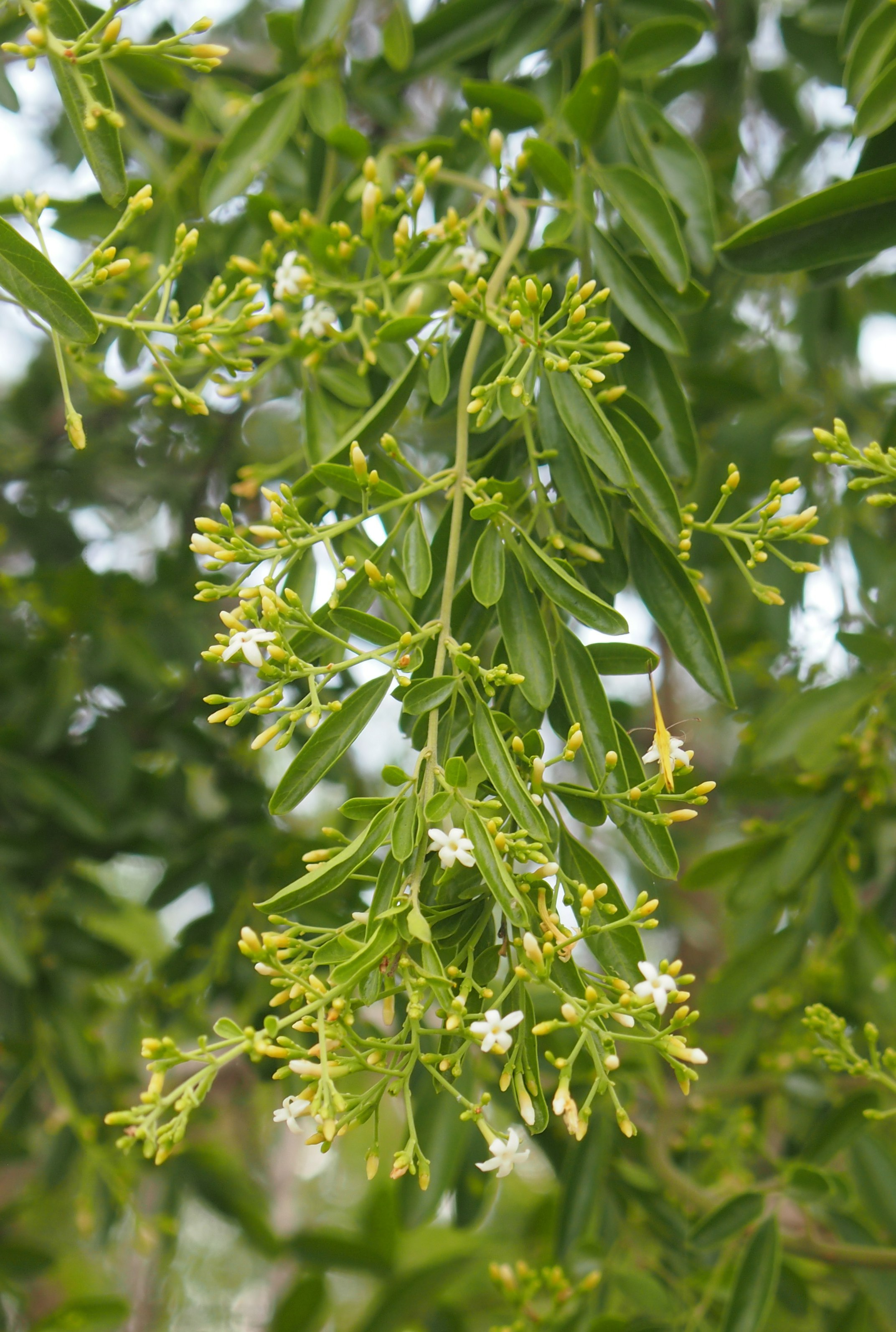
Jasminum didymym ssp. lineare flowers
