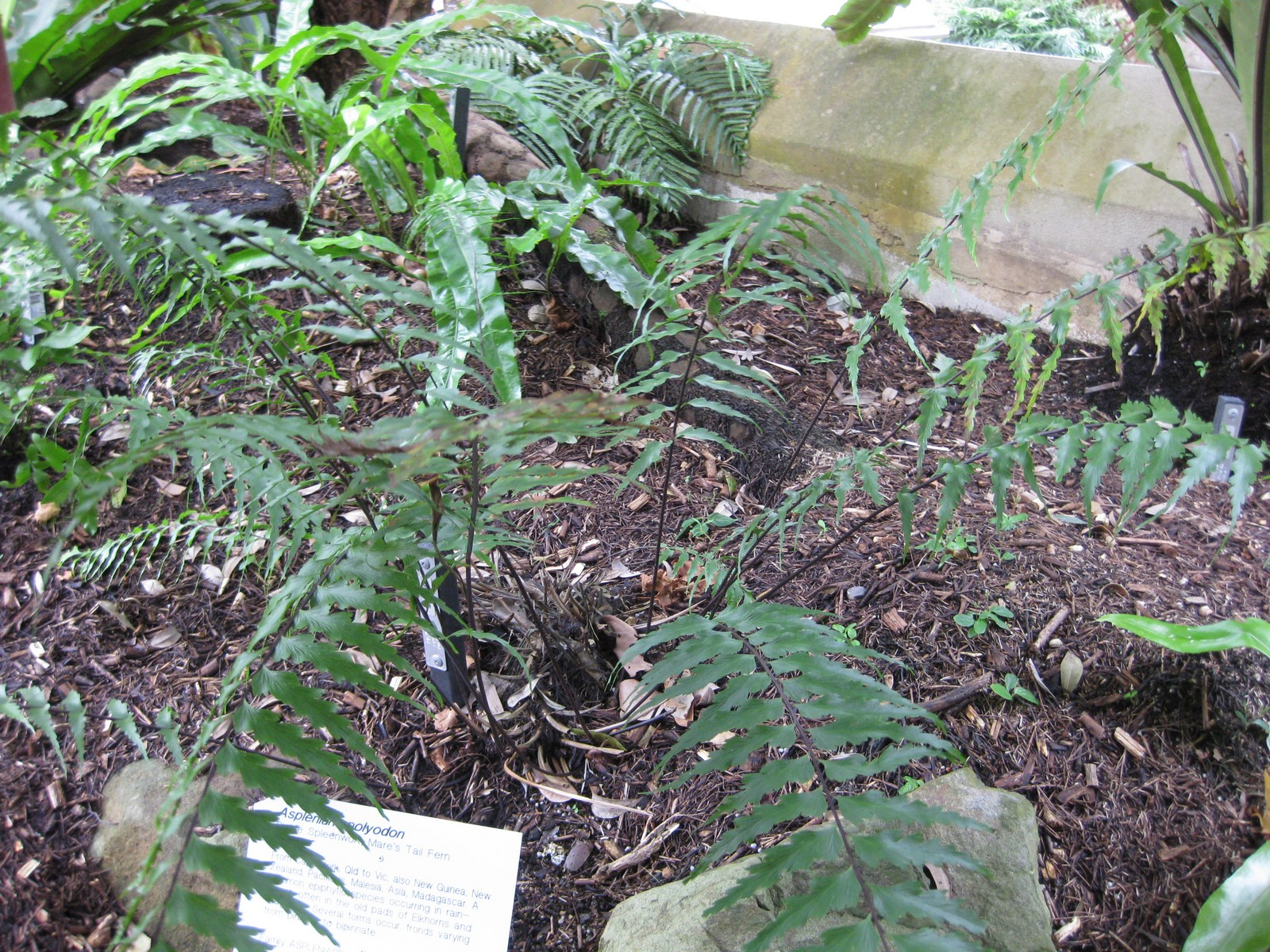
- A. polyodon growing at the Royal Botanic Gardens, Sydney

Conservation status
- Apparently Secure (NatureServe)

Scientific classification
- Kingdom: Plantae
- Clade: Tracheophytes
- Division: Polypodiophyta
- Class: Polypodiopsida
- Order: Polypodiales
- Suborder: Aspleniineae
- Family: Aspleniaceae
- Genus: Asplenium
- Species: A. polyodon

Binomial name
- Asplenium polyodon G.Forst.

= Asplenium polyodon =

Species of fern in the spleenwort family

Asplenium polyodon, commonly known as sickle spleenwort or petako, is a species of fern in the family Aspleniaceae. The distribution of A. polyodon includes parts of the countries of Australia and New Zealand. A specific locale of occurrence is in forested areas of Westland, New Zealand, where associate understory species include crown fern.
