= Meryta brachypoda =

Conservation status
- Critically Endangered (IUCN 2.3)

Scientific classification
- Kingdom: Plantae
- Clade: Tracheophytes
- Clade: Angiosperms
- Clade: Eudicots
- Clade: Asterids
- Order: Apiales
- Family: Araliaceae
- Genus: Meryta
- Species: M. brachypoda

Binomial name
- Meryta brachypoda Harms (1938)

Species of plant

Meryta brachypoda is a species of plant in the family Araliaceae. It is native to the islands of Raivavae and Rapa Iti in the Tubuai Islands of French Polynesia, and to Henderson Island in the Pitcairn Islands.
