= Ipomoea littoralis =

Scientific classification
- Kingdom: Plantae
- Clade: Tracheophytes
- Clade: Angiosperms
- Clade: Eudicots
- Clade: Asterids
- Order: Solanales
- Family: Convolvulaceae
- Genus: Ipomoea
- Species: I. littoralis

Binomial name
- Ipomoea littoralis Blume

Species of flowering plant

Ipomoea littoralis is a trailing herb or sometimes twining that is found tropical sea line area of Asia. The flower is beautiful and bright pink. In Bangladesh, it is found in Saint Martin's Island and along the Takanaf coastline of Cox's Bazar. The funnel-shaped, pink, or pinkish-purple flowers attract the insect. It is a rare wild morning glory in Bangladesh.
