= Joe Gock =

Joe (Moo Lock) Gock QSM (1928 – ) is a New Zealand horticulturalist. With his wife Fay Wong Gock, he made numerous innovations in the growing and selling of fruit and vegetables. Their contributions received multiple awards, most notably Horticulture New Zealand's Bledisloe Cup for their development of a black rot-resistant strain of kūmara, an indigenous sweet potato integral to Maori cuisine that was almost wiped out in the 1950s.

== Early life ==
He was born Gock Moo Lok (郭武樂) in 1928 in the village of Jook So Yuen, China. In 1940 he came with his mother to New Zealand as a refugee from the Japanese occupation of China. He attended school for four years before leaving to work in his father's market garden in the Hawke's Bay Region. They moved to Auckland in 1949, and the business became known as Kwong Sing & Sons.

== Family business ==
Gock met Fay Wong on a delivery to her family's fruit shop and the couple were married in 1956. They went into business together and were among the first in Auckland to grow Brussels sprouts, as well as growing peas, cauliflowers, carrots, parsnips and potatoes.

Gock and his wife produced seedless watermelon, and were the first in the world to develop individual fruit stickers to prevent deliverers mixing up seedless watermelons with seeded ones.

They began growing kūmara, an indigenous New Zealand sweet potato, after they were given some spare plants by a neighbour. At the time black rot (Ceratocystis fimbriata) was devastating kūmara crops in the region. Gock and his wife developed a disease-resistant strain and gifted stock for the use of other farmers, and are credited with the indigenous staple food's survival.

The Gocks also experimented with storage methods and invested in a curing shed that reduced wastage from up to 50% to less than 1%.

After the retirement of his parents, Gock continued the business under his own name. In the 1980s, he and his wife grew broccoli and had high demand for export, which posed packaging problems. After a process of trial and error, Gock developed and patented a polystyrene box which could hold the broccoli together with ice for transport.

== Community ==
Gock has donated to both local schools and marae, as well as to various village projects in his hometown. He has been an active member of the Chinese Commercial Growers Association for more than 60 years, and has mentored young Chinese growers in New Zealand. He and his wife have been honored for their contributions to the community and nation.

== Awards and recognition ==
In 2013, Gock and his wife jointly received the Bledisloe Cup for services to horticulture, citing their work as "pioneers" in the field.

In 2015, Gock was awarded the Queen's Service Medal.

In 2016 Gock and his wife's work was covered in a documentary short titled "How Mr and Mrs Gock Saved the Kumara".

== Personal life ==
Gock has three daughters: Jayne, Virginia, and Raewyn.
