= Fay Gock =

New Zealander horticulturalist

Fay Gock (25 March 1933 – 21 December 2018) was a New Zealand horticulturalist. With her husband Joe Gock, she made numerous innovations in the growing and selling of fruit and vegetables, for which they jointly won Horticulture New Zealand's Bledisloe Cup in 2013. They are credited with the survival of the indigenous sweet potato known as kūmara, integral to Maori cuisine.

== Early life ==
Gock was born Wong Way Gin (黄蕙娟) in China on 25 March 1933. In 1941, she and her mother left the county of Sunwui as refugees from the Japanese occupation, and came to New Zealand. Her family ran a fruit shop on Karangahape Road, Auckland. During the 1947 polio epidemic which closed North Island schools for four months, she went to work in her father's shop. There, she put up the first signs in their shop, and began the innovation of washing carrots to improve their sales, which soon caught on in nearby shops.

== Marriage and business ==
Fay Wong met Joe Gock, another young Chinese New Zealander, when he delivered a load of produce to her father's shop, and they married in 1956. They started their own growing business, although at the time, legal restrictions on Chinese immigrants meant they couldn't own land or build a house. Instead they lived in a barn as they grew their business to become the largest market garden in Mangere.

Together with her husband, Gock continued to innovate in their business, beginning commercial washing of vegetables, using a tumbler machine. They were among the first in Auckland to grow Brussels sprouts, as well as growing peas, cauliflowers, carrots, parsnips and potatoes.

They produced seedless watermelon, and were the first in the world to develop individual fruit stickers to prevent deliverers mixing up seedless watermelons with seeded ones.

They began growing kūmara after they were given some spare plants by a neighbour. At the time black rot (Ceratocystis fimbriata) was devastating crops in the region. Gock and her husband developed a disease-resistant strain and gifted stock for the use of other farmers. They also experimented with storage methods and invested in a curing shed that reduced wastage from up to 50% to less than 1%.

For 40 years, Gock grew rhubarb as a backyard hobby, refining the strain to improve production. For a long time there was little market for it, but when others stopped growing it, demand increased and the business was soon exporting rhubarb to England and Japan. Meanwhile, she planted a low-lying area with taro, and sold the leaves for use in Pacific Islander umu cooking.

== Awards and recognition ==
In 2013, Gock and her husband jointly received the Bledisloe Cup for services to horticulture, citing their work as "pioneers" in the field.

In 2016 Gock and her husband's work was covered in a documentary file titled "How Mr and Mrs Gock Saved the Kumara".

== Personal life and death ==
Gock had three daughters: Jayne, Virginia, and Raewyn. She died after a sudden illness on 21 December 2018.
