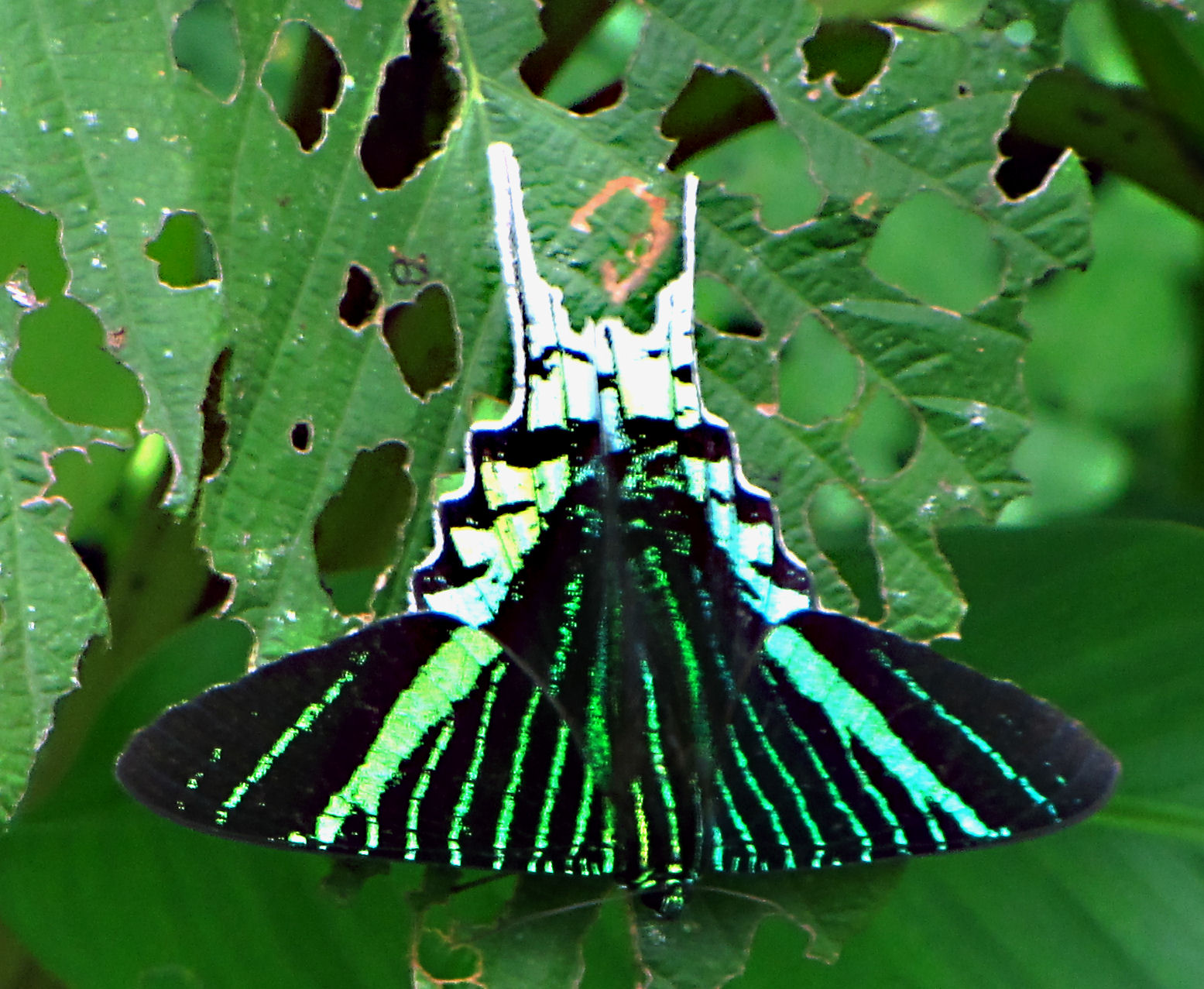
- Urania leilus from South America

Scientific classification
- Kingdom: Animalia
- Phylum: Arthropoda
- Clade: Pancrustacea
- Class: Insecta
- Order: Lepidoptera
- Family: Uraniidae
- Subfamily: Uraniinae; Blanchard, 1845

Genera
- Alcides; Chrysiridia; Cyphura; Lyssa; Urania; Urapteritra; Urapteroides

= Uraniinae =

Subfamily of moths

Uraniinae phylogeny
after Lees and Smith 1991

- - (1)
    - - - (2)
          - - Urania
            - Chrysiridia
          - Alcides
        - Lyssa
      - - Urapteroides
        - Cyphura
  - Acropteris

(1) Use Endospermum as a food plant.
(2) Use Omphalea as a food plant
and adults are diurnal.
Urapterita is not included for lack of data.

The Uraniinae or uraniine moths are a subfamily of moths in the family Uraniidae. It contains seven genera that occur in the tropics of the world.

Three of its genera (Alcides, Chrysiridia, and Urania) are essentially diurnal, although some crepuscular activity has been recorded. They are blackish with markings in iridescent green or light blue; some species have orange, gold or pink highlights. They are as brightly marked as the most colorful butterflies; indeed, they bear an uncanny resemblance in shape and coloration to some papilionid butterflies (swallowtails and relatives). They are also usually toxic, hence the bright warning colors. Cases are known where harmless butterflies mimic these toxic moths, e.g. Papilio laglaizei and Alcides agathyrsus.

The remaining genera in the subfamily are far less colorful, overall gray-brown with a light band on each wing (Lyssa) or white with brownish markings (Cyphura, Urapteritra, and Urapteroides), and mainly nocturnal or crepuscular. Despite their relatively dull colors, Lyssa species are impressive because of their large size with a typical wingspan of 10–16 cm (3.9–6.3 in). No other species in the subfamily has a wingspan that exceeds 10 cm (3.9 in).

== Species ==
This list of species is adapted mostly with some rearrangements from The Global Lepidoptera Names Index; it is likely to be fairly complete (as of January 2006) as including valid species for most of which distributional information is here given.

- Alcides Hübner, [1822]

- Alcides agathyrsus Kirsch, 1877 (New Guinea)
- Alcides argyrios Gmelin, 1788
- Alcides arnus Felder & Rogenhofer, 1874
- Alcides aruus Felder, 1874 (Aru I.)
- Alcides aurora Salvin & Godman, 1877 (New Britain, New Ireland)
- Alcides boops Westwood, 1879
- Alcides cydnus Felder, 1859 (Maluku)
- Alcides latona Druce, 1886 (Solomons)
- Alcides liris Felder, 1860 (New Guinea)
- Alcides metaurus (Hopffer, 1856) (Australia)
- Alcides orontes (Linnaeus, 1763) (Moluccas, Ambon Island)
- Alcides ribbei Pagenstecher, 1912
- Alcides sordidior Rothschild, 1916
- Alcides zodiaca (Butler, 1869) (Australia)

- Chrysiridia Hübner, [1823]

- Chrysiridia croesus (Gerstaecker, 1871) – African sunset moth (Tanzania)
- Chrysiridia rhipheus (Drury, 1773) – Madagascan sunset moth (Madagascar)

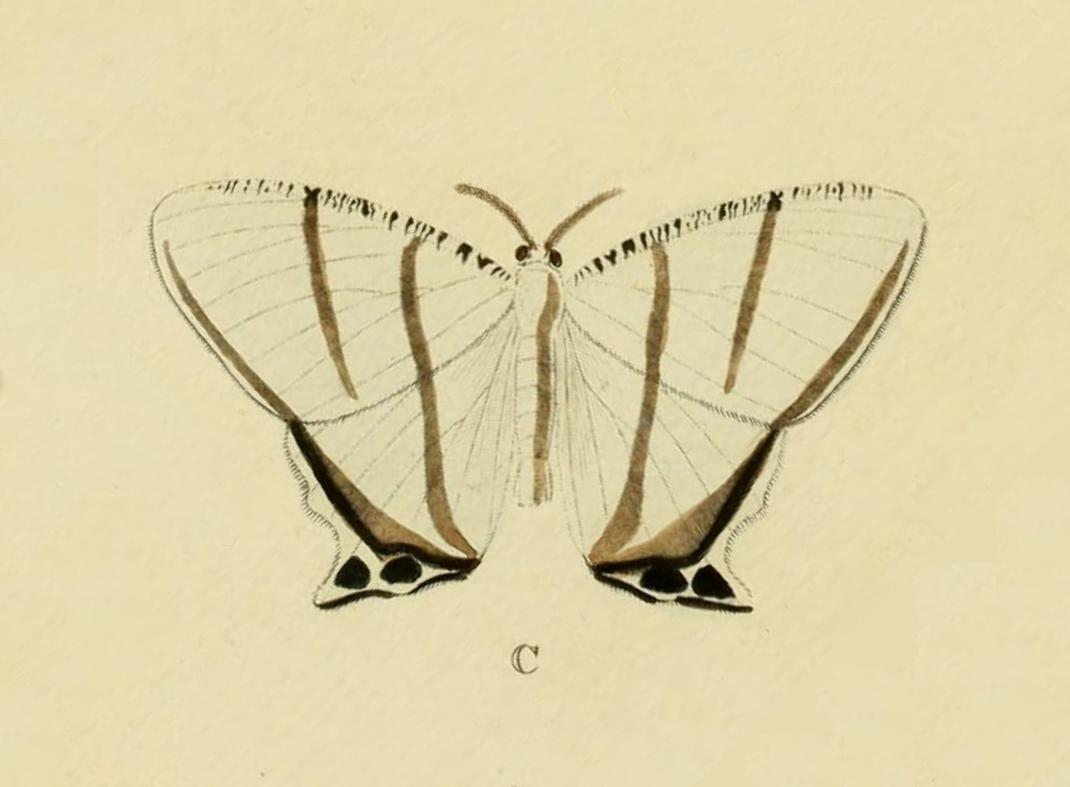
Cyphura geminia from Ambon Island, Maluku

- Cyphura Warren, 1902

- Cyphura albisecta Warren
- Cyphura approximans Swinhoe, 1916
- Cyphura atramentaria Warren
- Cyphura bifasciata Butler, 1879
- Cyphura catenulata Warren, 1902
- Cyphura caudiferaria Boisduval
- Cyphura clarissima Butler
- Cyphura costalis Butler
- Cyphura dealbata Warren
- Cyphura destrigata Kirsch
- Cyphura extensa Rothschild
- Cyphura falka Swinhoe
- Cyphura geminia (Cramer, 1777) (Ambon Island)
- Cyphura gutturalis Swinhoe, 1916
- Cyphura latimarginata Swinhoe, 1902
- Cyphura maxima Strand
- Cyphura multistrigaria Warren
- Cyphura mundaria Walker
- Cyphura pannata Felder
- Cyphura pardata Warren
- Cyphura phantasma Felder
- Cyphura pieridaria Warren, 1902
- Cyphura reducta Joicey & Talbot
- Cyphura semialba Warren
- Cyphura semiobsoleta Warren
- Cyphura subsimilis Warren, 1902
- Cyphura swinhoei Joicey, 1917
- Cyphura urapteroides Joicey

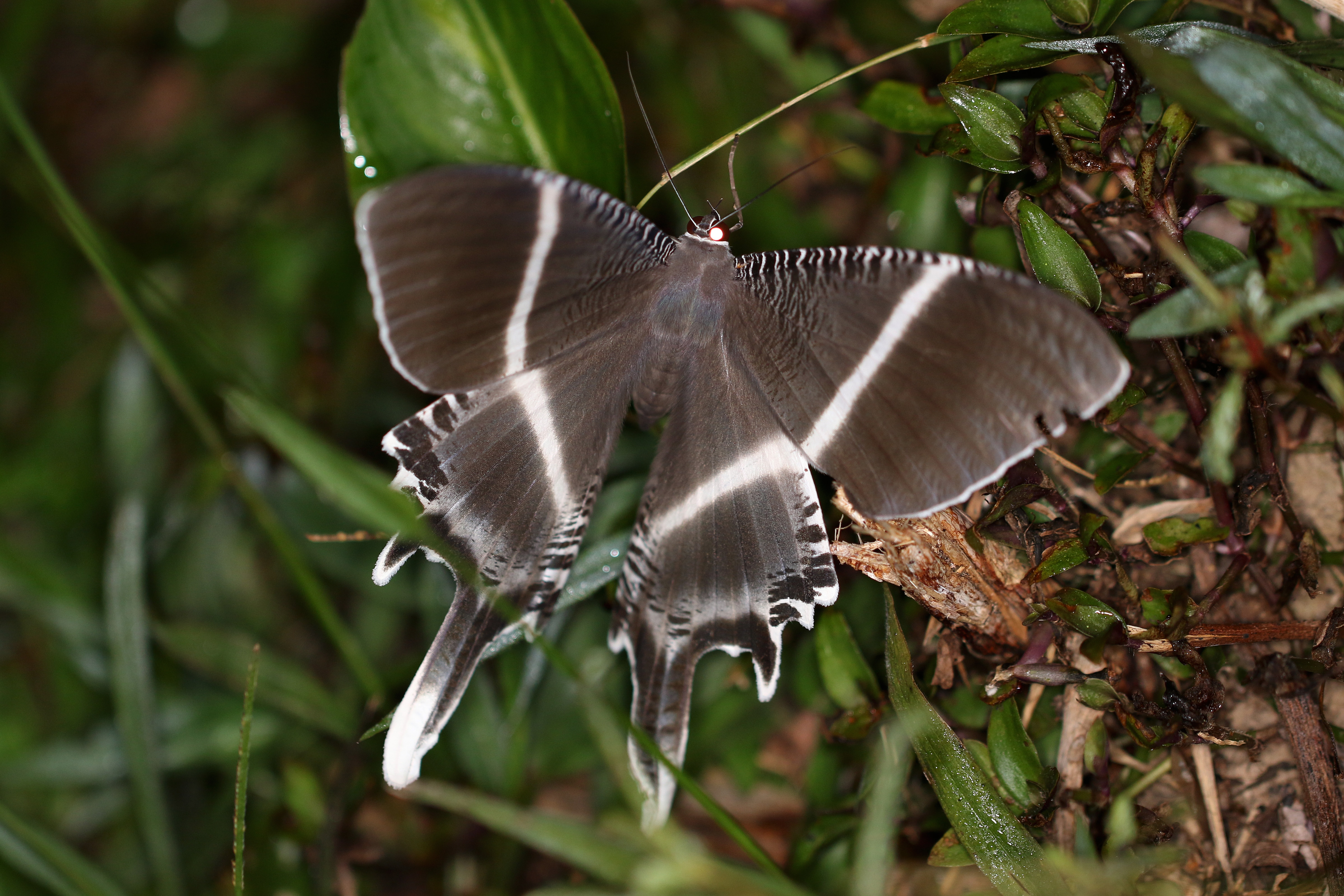
Giant uranid moth (Lyssa menoetius), Sabah, Borneo

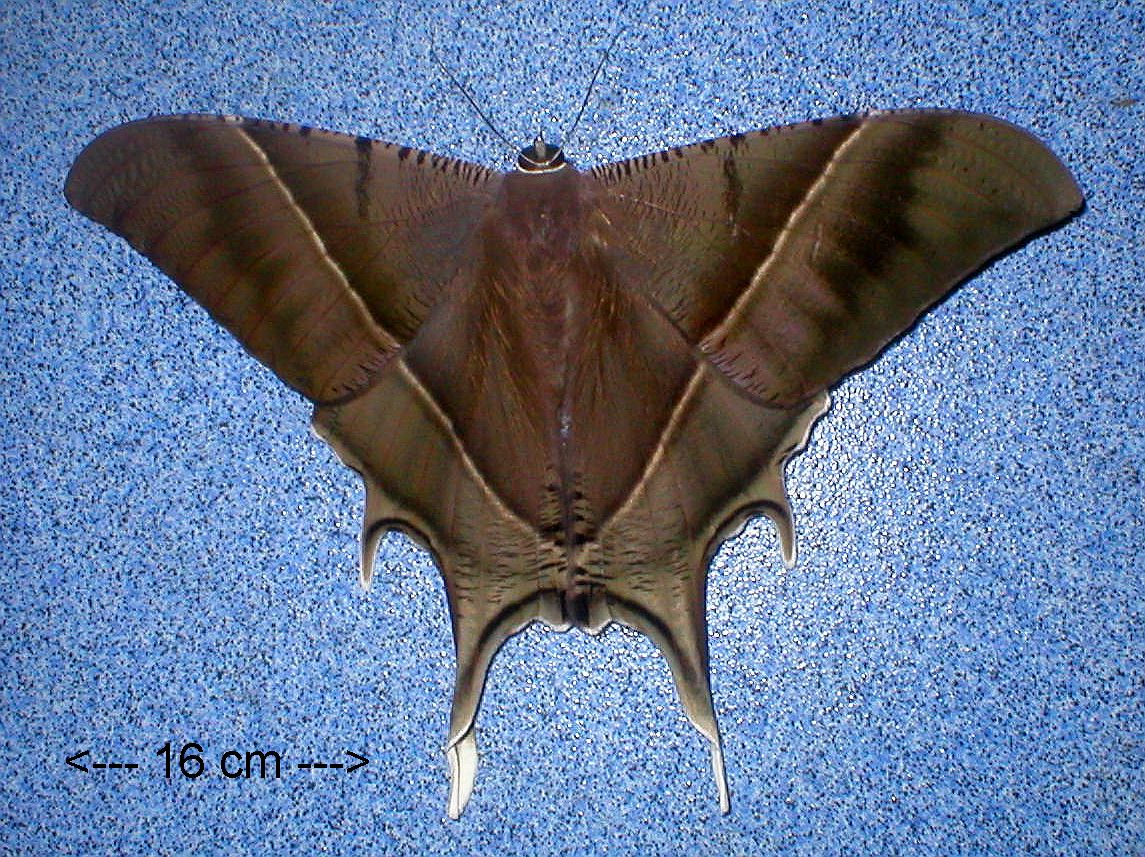
Lyssa zampa from Laos

- Lyssa Hübner, 1823

- Lyssa achillaria Hübner, 1816
- Lyssa curvata Skinner, 1903 (Vanuatu)
- Lyssa fletcheri Regteren Altena, 1953
- Lyssa macleayi (Montrouzier, 1857) (Australia)
- Lyssa menoetius (Hopffer, 1856) (Borneo, Philippines, Sangir, Sulawesi)

- Lyssa menoetius adspersus (Regteren Altena, 1953) (Kalimantan)
- Lyssa menoetius celebensis (Regteren Altena, 1953) (Sulawesi)

- Lyssa mutata Butler, 1887 (Solomons)
- Lyssa patroclus (Linnaeus, 1758) (Moluccas)
- Lyssa patroclaria Hübner, 1816
- Lyssa toxopeusi Regteren Altena, 1953
- Lyssa velutinus Röber, 1927
- Lyssa zampa (Butler, 1869) (Himalaya to southern China, Thailand, Andamans, Philippines, Sulawesi)

- Lyssa zampa docile (Butler, 1877) (Andaman Islands)
- Lyssa zampa dilutus (Röber, 1927) (Sulawesi)

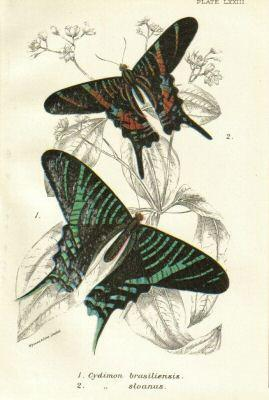
Lithograph of Urania sloanus (top) and Urania brasiliensis (bottom) published in 1897; they were formerly placed in the genus Cydimon

- Urania Fabricius, 1807

- Urania leilus (Linnaeus, 1758) (Central and Amazonian South America)
- Urania brasiliensis Swainson, 1833 (Atlantic forest, Brazil)
- Urania fulgens (Walker, 1854) (Veracruz, Mexico, throughout Central America to northern Ecuador west of the Andes)
- Urania poeyi Herrich-Schäffer, 1866 (E. Cuba)
- Urania boisduvalii Guérin-Meneville, 1829 (W. Cuba)
- Urania amphiclus Guenée, 1857]
- Urania elegans Niepelt, 1930
- Urania fernandinae MacLeay, 1834
- Urania surinamensis Swainson]
- Urania occidentalis Swainson, 1833
- Urania sloanus Cramer, 1779 (Jamaica, extinct circa 1894)
- Urania sloanaria Hübner, 1816

- Urapteritra Viette, 1972

- Urapteritra antsianakariae Oberthür, 1923 (Madagascar)
- Urapteritra falcifera (Weymer, 1892) (East Africa)
- Urapteritra mabillei Viette, 1972 (Madagascar)
- Urapteritra montana Viette, 1972 (Madagascar)
- Urapteritra piperita Oberthür, 1923 (Madagascar)
- Urapteritra recurvata Warren (Madagascar)
- Urapteritra suavis Oberthür, 1923 (Madagascar)
- Urapteritra fasciata (Mabille, 1878)(Madagascar)

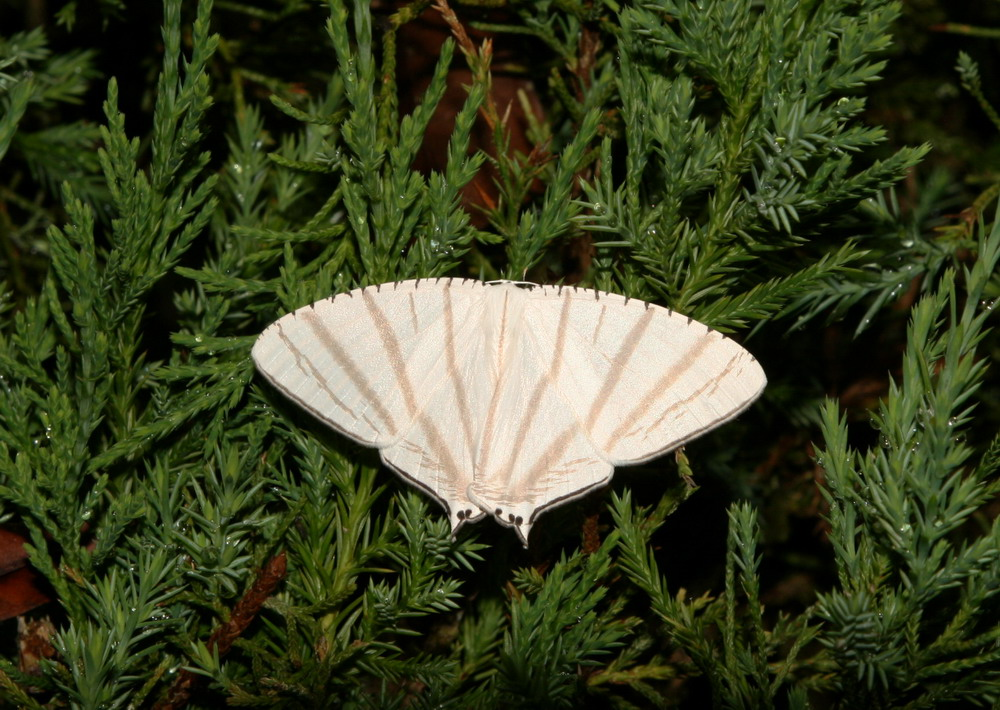
Urapteroides astheniata from Australia

- Urapteroides Moore, 1888

- Urapteroides anerces Meyrick, 1886 (Fiji)
- Urapteroides astheniata (Guenée, 1857) (Himalaya to New Guinea, Queensland)
- Urapteroides diana Swinhoe (Peninsular Malaysia) (possibly a form of U. astheniata)
- Urapteroides equestraria Boisduval
- Urapteroides hermaea Druce, 1888
- Urapteroides hyemalis Butler, 1887 (Solomons, Vanuatu)
- Urapteroides malgassaria Mabille, 1878
- Urapteroides swinhoei Rothschild
- Urapteroides urapterina Butler, 1877
