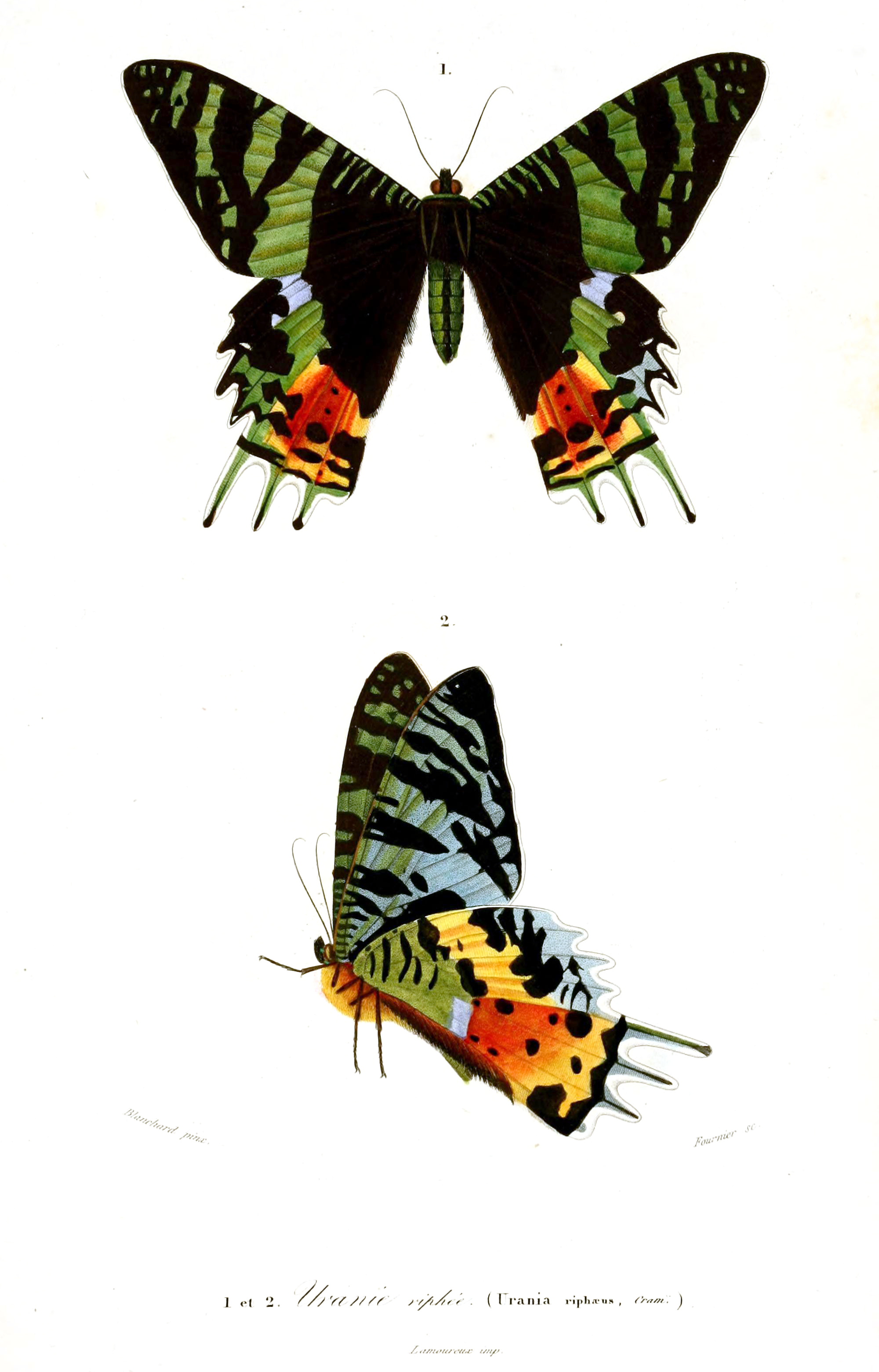
- Engraving captioned Urania riphaeus from Charles D. d'Orbigny's Dictionnaire universel d'histoire naturelle (1849)

Scientific classification
- Kingdom: Animalia
- Phylum: Arthropoda
- Clade: Pancrustacea
- Class: Insecta
- Order: Lepidoptera
- Family: Uraniidae
- Genus: Chrysiridia
- Species: C. rhipheus

Binomial name
- Chrysiridia rhipheus (Drury, 1773)
- Endemic to Madagascar

Synonyms
- Papilio rhipheus Drury, 1773; Chrysiridia riphearia Hübner, 1823; Urania ripheus var. madagascariensis Lesson, 1831; Rhipheus dasycephalus Swainson, 1833; Leilus orientalis Swainson, 1833; Urania druryi Boisduval, 1874; Urania crameri Maassen, 1897; Urania papageno Niepelt, 1931; Urania ripheus; Urania rhiphaeus; Urania rhipheus; Chrysiridia madagascariensis; Chrysiridia rhiphaeus; Chrysiridia ripheus

= Chrysiridia rhipheus =

Madagascan sunset moth

Species of moth

Chrysiridia rhipheus, the Madagascan sunset moth, is a species of day-flying moth of the family Uraniidae. It is considered one of the most impressive and appealing-looking lepidopterans. Famous worldwide, it is featured in most coffee table books on Lepidoptera and is much sought after by collectors, though many older sources misspell the species name as "ripheus". The colours originate from optical interference in the iridescent parts of the wings, while the black parts are pigmented. Adults have a wingspan of 7–9 cm (2.8–3.5 in).

Dru Drury, who described the moth in 1773, placed it in the genus Papilio, considering it a butterfly. Jacob Hübner placed it in the moth genus Chrysiridia in 1823. Later redescriptions led to junior synonyms such as Chrysiridia madagascariensis (Lesson, 1831).

At first the moth was thought to be from China, or Bengal, but was later found to be endemic to Madagascar. It is found throughout the year in most parts of the island, with peak populations between March and August, and smallest numbers between October and December. Females lay about 80 eggs under the leaves of Omphalea spp. The caterpillars are whitish yellow with black spots and red feet and are covered in club-ended black setae. Silk spun from the mouth helps the caterpillars hold on to smooth leaves and climb back to the plant when they fall. After completing four instars, the caterpillars spin an open network cocoon. The pupal stage lasts from 17 to 23 days. Chrysiridia rhipheus is the sole specialist herbivore of the four species of Omphalea in Madagascar. Omphalea is toxic: the toxins are sequestered by the feeding caterpillar and retained in the pupal and adult stages. Thousands of these moths migrate between the eastern and western ranges of their host plants.

== Taxonomy ==
The Madagascan sunset moth was first described by the British entomologist Dru Drury in 1773 from a specimen obtained from a Captain May of Hammersmith. Because of its resemblance to swallowtail butterflies, Drury described the species as Papilio rhipheus.^{1} The specimen Drury received had the head of a different species attached, probably that of a butterfly, which had clubbed antennae—this trait is frequently used to differentiate moths from butterflies. Once the inaccuracy in Drury's specimen was found, the moth was placed in the genus Urania, until 1823 when the German entomologist Jacob Hübner placed it in a new genus, Chrysiridia. The moth has also been described under other names. Because Drury described his specimen as having clubbed antennae and being tailless, William Swainson thought it was a different species than the complete specimen described by Pieter Cramer. In 1833, Swainson named the butterfly Rhipheus dasycephalus and the moth Leilus orientalis. Other synonyms include U. crameri by Maassen in 1879 and U. ripheus var. madagascariensis by Lesson in 1831.

Native Malagasy people call it adriandolo or lolonandriana, from lolo for "spirit" or "butterfly" and andriana for "noble" or "king", therefore meaning "noble butterfly", "noble spirit", "king butterfly" or "king spirit".

The genus Chrysiridia is entirely African and the only other species in the genus is the East African C. croesus. Chrysiridia is one of three diurnal uraniine genera. The other two genera are Urania, its sister taxon, and Alcides, the most basal. In the group, the use of Endospermum is an ancestral state (a plesiomorphy). The more basal Alcides feed on Endospermum and Omphalea, while Urania and Chrysiridia feed only on Omphalea.

== Description ==
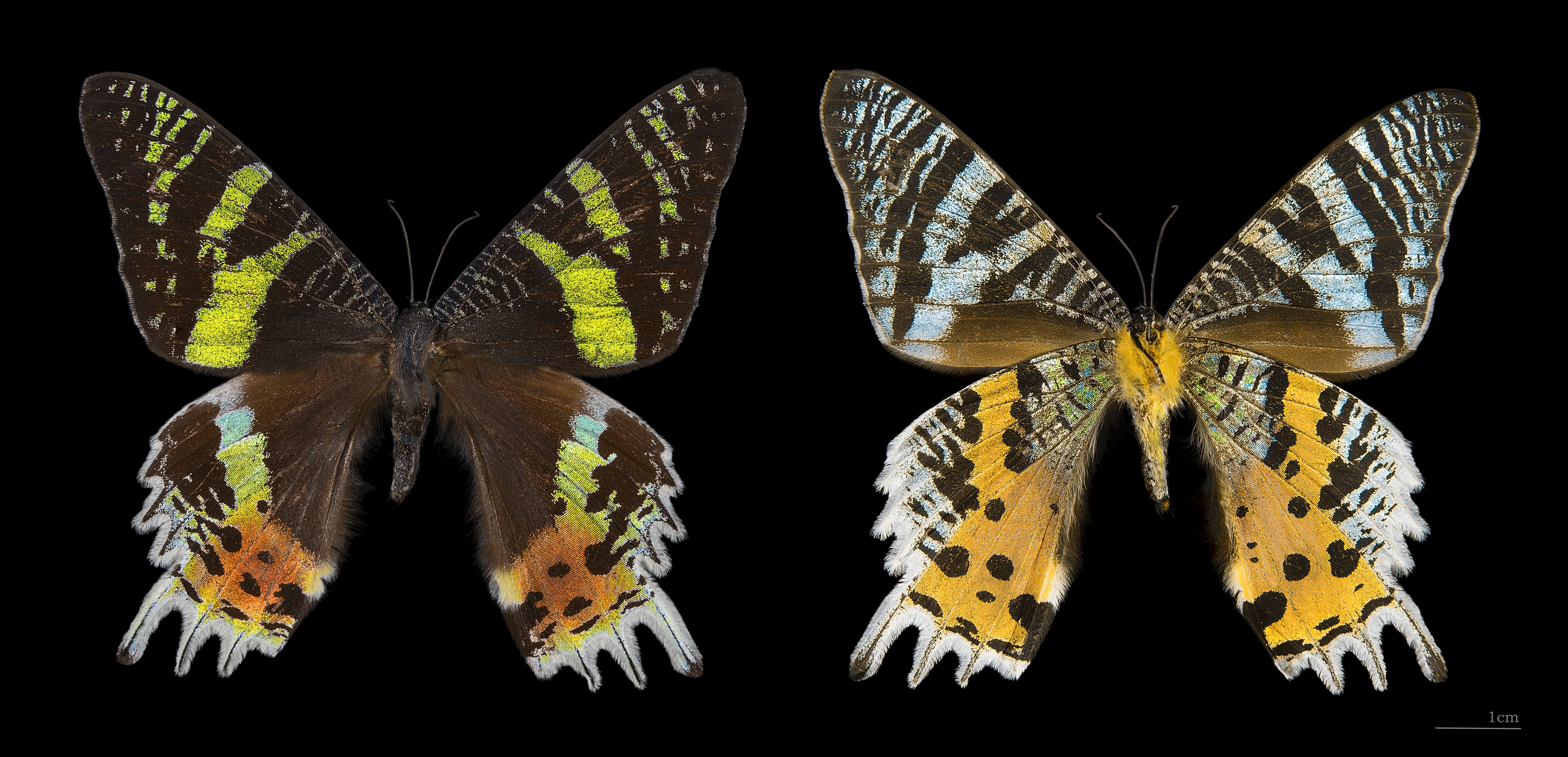
Both sides of Chrysiridia rhipheus

Chrysiridia rhipheus has a wingspan of 7–9 centimetres (2.8–3.5 in), and sometimes up to 11 centimetres (4.3 in). Moths from the highlands, 900–1,080 metres (2,950–3,540 ft), have a median wingspan of 7 cm (2.8 in); moths from lower altitudes, 600 m (2,000 ft), have a median wingspan of 9 cm (3.5 in). Like many other uraniine moths, the sunset moth has an uncanny resemblance to swallowtail butterflies, especially in its tails and colourful wings, and can easily be mistaken for a butterfly.

The sunset moth is black with iridescent red, blue and green markings. There is a fringe of white scales on the wing edges, wider on the hindwings. The moth has six tails, very often lost or damaged during its life. Pattern variations are common, and the moth is often partly asymmetrical; one of the factors causing this is temperature shock during the pupal stage.

=== Wing microstructure ===
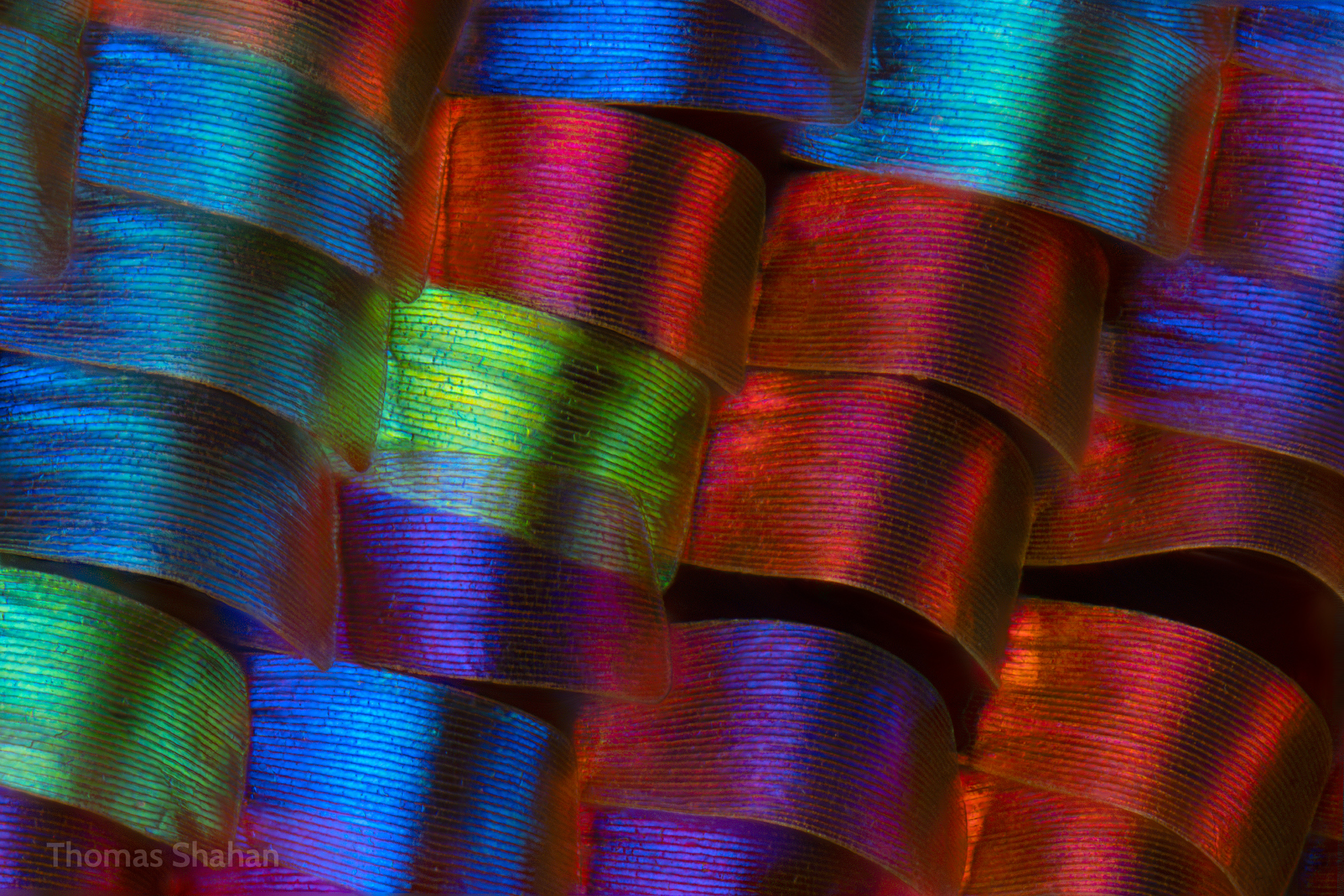
Chrysiridia rhipheus scale detail

Unlike in many other moths, the colour of C. rhipheus's wings does not come from pigments. The colour originates from coherent scattering and interference of light by the microstructure of the ribbon-like scales covering the moth's wings. These structural characteristics make this species and its Neotropical relative Urania common subjects of research in optical science.

The colours on the Madagascan sunset moth's wings are produced by the conjunction of two optical phenomena:

1. An air-cuticle multilayer in the scales creates optical interference. Each scale contains cuticle layers with randomly located blocks of cuticle that hold them in place and maintain an air gap between them. The layers and air gaps are narrower than the wavelength of visible light. The structure varies from one layer at the proximal end of each scale, to about six layers at the distal end. This multilayer structure strongly reflects certain wavelengths of light, which are determined by the thicknesses of the layers and the angle at which the light hits the scale.
2. The scales are highly curved, which creates inter-scale reflection. This mechanism is unusual among Lepidoptera. The proximal part of each scale is almost flat; the scale then gradually curves up and then steeply bends down at the distal end, covering the proximal part of the next row of scales. Because of this shape, adjacent rows of scales have valley-like grooves between them. This allows light to strike one scale, reflect at a roughly 90° angle, strike the next scale, and be reflected away from the wing. Because the angle of each reflection is far from normal incidence, the interference effect favours reflection of different colours of light than are seen when light strikes near the top of the curved part of the scale.

The colour seen in each part of the wing is the combination of the colours reflected by these two effects.

Because the cuticle layers are arranged in rows, with a cylindrical curve, the amount of the second type of reflection is dependent on the polarization of the incoming light. This makes the moth's overall colour polarization-dependent. Many insects can detect polarization of light, so it has been proposed that this feature may be used as a visual signal between moths. This has not yet been studied, however.

== Distribution and habitat ==
Distribution of the four species of Omphalea in Madagascar

Drury's specimen was given to him by Captain May of Hammersmith and believed to have come from China. Cramer believed the specimen came from Chandernagore in Bengal, however, giving rise to the French name "page de Chadernagor". It is now known that Chrysiridia rhipheus is endemic to Madagascar. Thousands of adult moths seasonally migrate between geographically isolated populations of their host plant Omphalea spp. They can be found almost everywhere on the island, except in the south-west and the extreme subdesertic south of the Androy where their host plant is absent. They migrate from the three species in the dry deciduous forest in the west (O. ankaranensis, O. occidentalis and O. palmata) to the eastern rainforest species (O. oppositifolia). The western species are largely in protected areas. The eastern species, on the other hand, is mostly unprotected and dispersed in widely scattered populations threatened by deforestation. Being the only evergreen species, O. oppositifolia is probably crucial for the moth's survival. The Jamaican moth Urania sloanus, from the same subfamily (Uraniinae), most likely became extinct after the loss of one of its host plant species.

The moths migrate in response to changes in the host plants. Chrysiridia larvae defoliate the whole plant, and even eat the flowers and fruit, and thus have a considerable negative impact on the reproduction and survival of seedlings. The plants probably react by changing their nutrient and secondary compound levels, becoming toxic to the larvae and causing high mortality. Omphalea populations that are not damaged by moths for long periods of time have lower toxicity. These factors cause mass increases in local population, followed by sudden crashes. The population crashes might result from increased larval mortality, but are more likely caused by the emigration of the adult moths. Through semiochemicals, the plant may recruit hymenopteran parasitoids as a protection, hence playing a role in the population dynamics of the moth.

=== Host plants ===
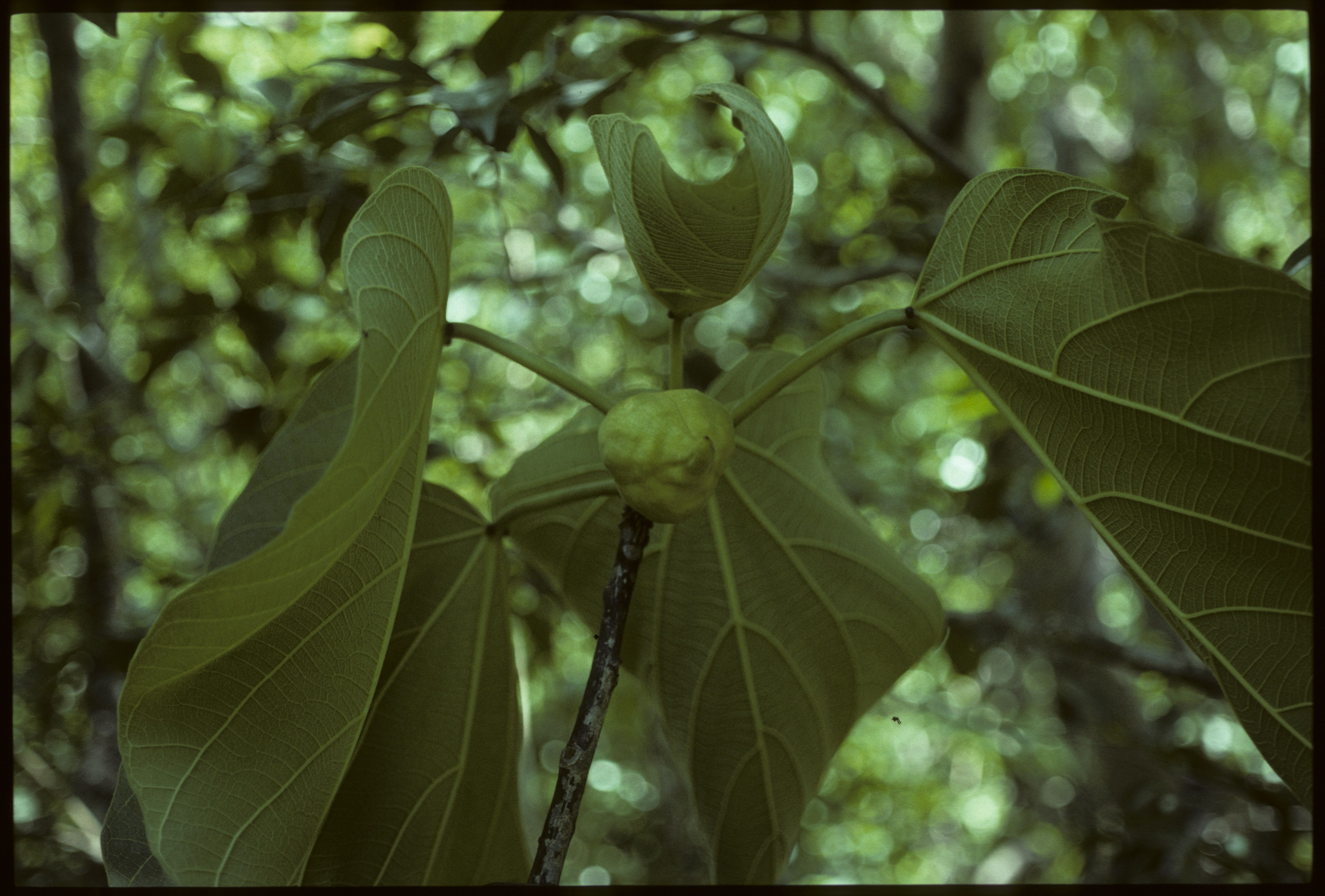
Omphalea occidentalis, one of the four species that serve as host plants

Like C. croesus and species of the genus Urania, C. rhipheus is a specialist species whose caterpillars feed strictly on species of the pantropical genus Omphalea (Euphorbiaceae). Four species of the genus Omphalea are endemic to Madagascar:

- O. ankaranensis, a shrub from the limestone karst of northern Madagascar
- O. palmata, a dry forest shrub, closely related to O. ankaranensis, but from western Madagascar
- O. occidentalis, also a dry forest species of western Madagascar
- O. oppositifolia, a tree from the east coast rainforest of Madagascar

Omphalea, like many other members of the Euphorbiaceae, possesses leaf nectaries that attract polistine wasps, which are predators of early instar caterpillars. The leaf nectaries also attract ants. The ants usually protect their host plant, eating both the nectar and plant-eating insects on it. However, they generally completely ignore Chrysiridia caterpillars, making it likely that the caterpillars possess a chemical deterrent as a primary defence. This chemical deterrent comes from the host plants. Omphalea species contain polyhydroxy alkaloids potentially sequestered or excreted by the caterpillar, the pupa and the adult moth.

== Behaviour ==
Unlike most moths, the sunset moth is day flying and the bright aposematic colours warn predators of its toxicity, a strategy seen in many diurnal moths. Another habit the moth has in common with many butterflies is the night resting posture—the wings are held vertically over the back. During their migrations they roost in a group for the night. The moth flies over the crown of trees and in clearings. Sometimes because of high winds it is carried about 100 m (300 ft), it then falls, inert and wings closed, to the ground.

=== Life cycle ===
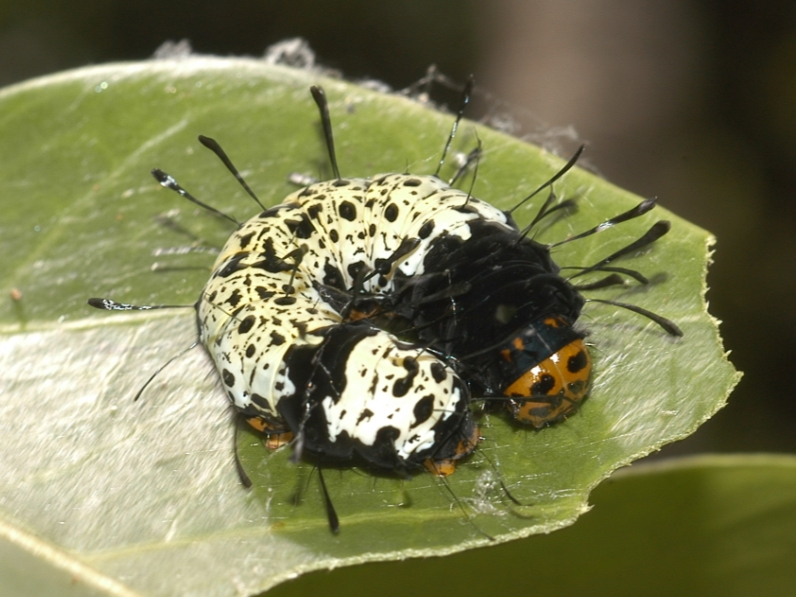
Final instar larva, shown here on the leaf of Omphalea oppositifolia

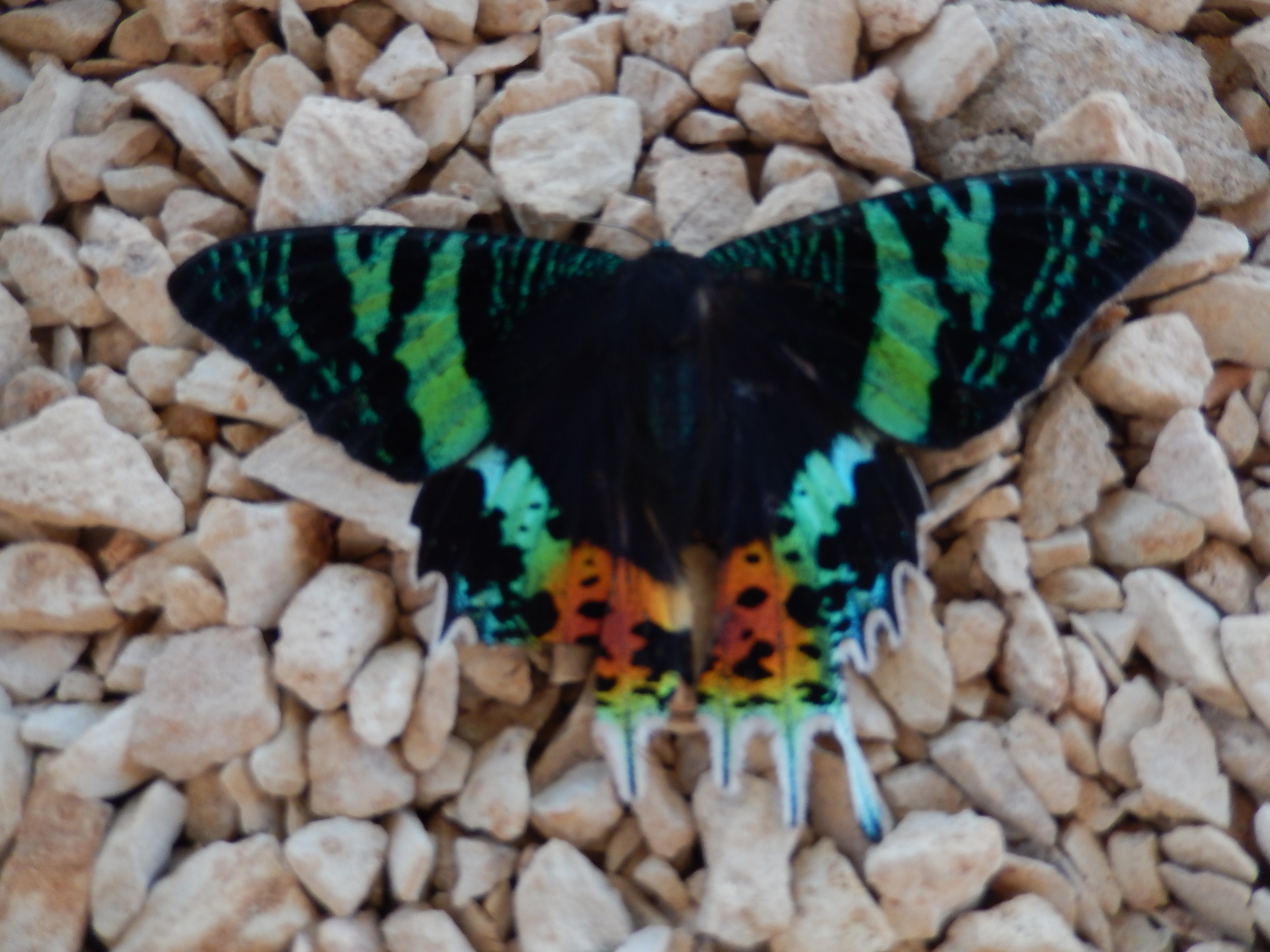
Adult Chrysiridia rhipheus at Madagascar near Mahajanga

Continuous generations of the moth are present all year. The highest populations are found from March to August (fall and winter), while the lowest are from October to December (spring). The females lay their eggs late in the afternoon or at nightfall, and locate potential oviposition sites visually. Like the eggs of other Uraniidae, the sunset moth's eggs are domed with projecting ribs. A single egg weighs about 1 milligram (3.5×10^{−5} oz) and usually has 17 ribs, but sometimes 18 or less often 16. The eggs are usually laid on the lower surface of Omphalea leaves, but occasionally on the upper surface. Eggs are laid in groups of 60 to 110, usually about 80.

After they hatch, the small caterpillars only eat the tissue (parenchyma) between the veins of the leaves. They do this to avoid the sticky and toxic latex produced by the plant's laticifers and transported in the veins. After 3–4 days, the caterpillars also eat flowers, fruit, tendrils, petioles and young stems (as well as continuing to eat leaves), defoliating the entire plant. They are particularly fond of the glands at the base of the leaf, near the petiole. They can deal with the chemical defences in the latex, which does not cause the problem of mouthpart coagulation. The caterpillars spin silk from their mouth with an '∞' motion of the head as they walk, this keeps them from falling from the smooth surface of the leaves. The silk also permits them to climb back to the plant should they fall. Strong rain makes them fall despite the silk. There are four instars, and the caterpillar stage lasts from two months in the warm season to two and a half to three months in the cold season. The caterpillar is whitish yellow with black spots and red feet and is covered in club-ended black setae. It has five pairs of prolegs on segments 3 to 6 and 10, and six true legs attached to the thorax.

After completing all but its last moult, the caterpillar spins a cocoon out of silk. The cocoon can be in the tree crown or between two leaves, but is most often near the ground, between moss and bark. It is an open network cocoon with large and irregular mesh. In the warm season, the cocoon takes about 10 hours to spin, the metamorphosis takes place about 29 hours later and lasts about 6 minutes. These durations are slightly longer in the cold season. The chrysalis stage lasts 17 days in November, the warmest month, and 23 days in July, the coldest month. Five to six days before eclosion, the motifs of the wings start to become visible. The moth emerges during the night or in low light, by splitting the pupal case from the top. Once out of the pupal exuvia (the pupal exoskeleton), the moth finds a horizontal surface, from which it suspends itself by its four anterior legs. The wings are deployed in about 10 minutes, by pumping haemolymph into the wing veins. The moth then beats them a few times, waits 45 minutes to let them harden, then beats them lightly again. The moth finally takes flight between one-and-a-half and two hours later.

=== Nectar sources ===
Adult moths prefer white or whitish-yellow flowers as a nectar source, which indicates that visual cues play a large role in their selection. Most flowers visited are inflorescences of small flowers or have dense filaments, giving them the appearance of a bottle brush, often because of the conspicuous projecting stamens as in many Leguminosae (Mimosoideae, Myrtaceae and Combretaceae). However, not all white flowers elicit a response: the white and showy flowers of Omphalea oppositifolia are not visited by the adult moths. Nectar sources include the flowers of:

- Terminalia catappa (Indian almond)
- Camellia sinensis (tea plant)
- Eriobotrya japonica (loquat)
- Eucalyptus spp., especially E. saligna (Sydney blue gum)
- Cussonia vantsilana
- Mangifera indica (common mango tree)

All these flowers are white, with the exception of Camellia sinensis which has a yellow centre, and all either have dense filaments or are formed of tight clusters of small flowers.

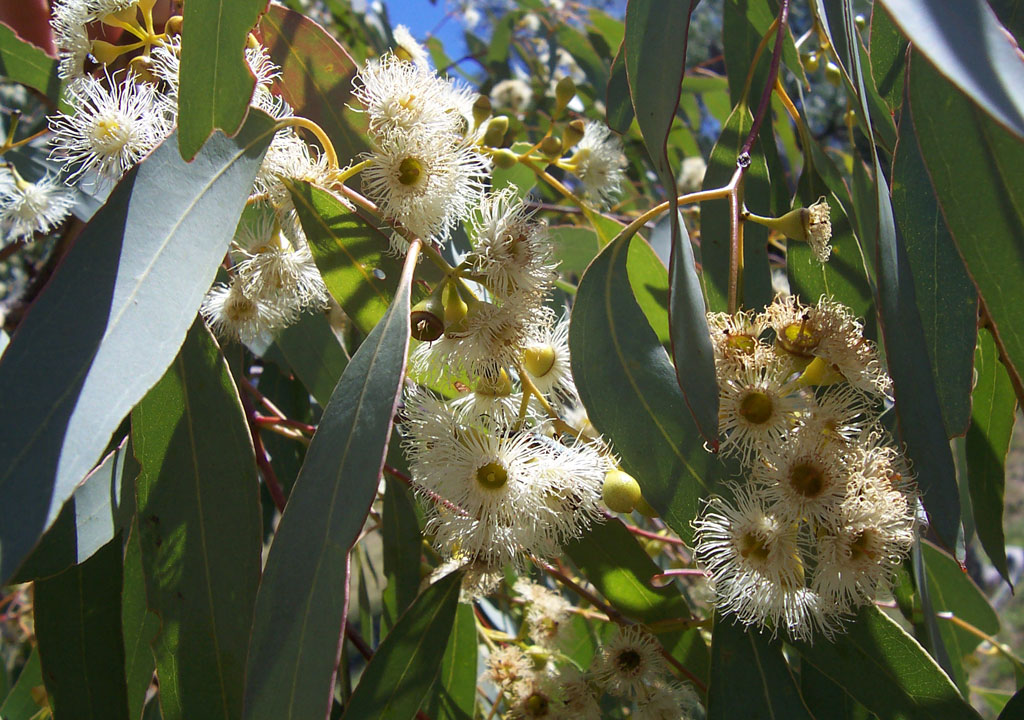
Eucalyptus melliodora inflorescence

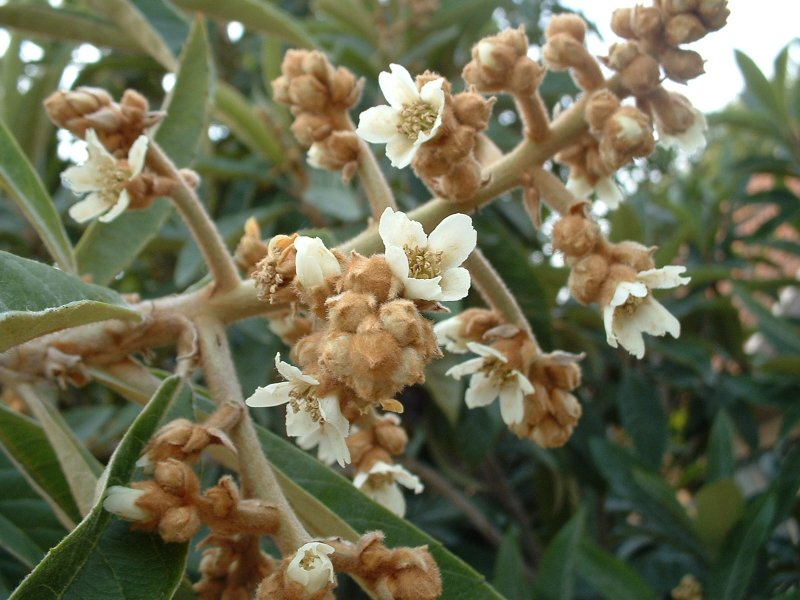
Loquat (Eriobotrya japonica) inflorescence

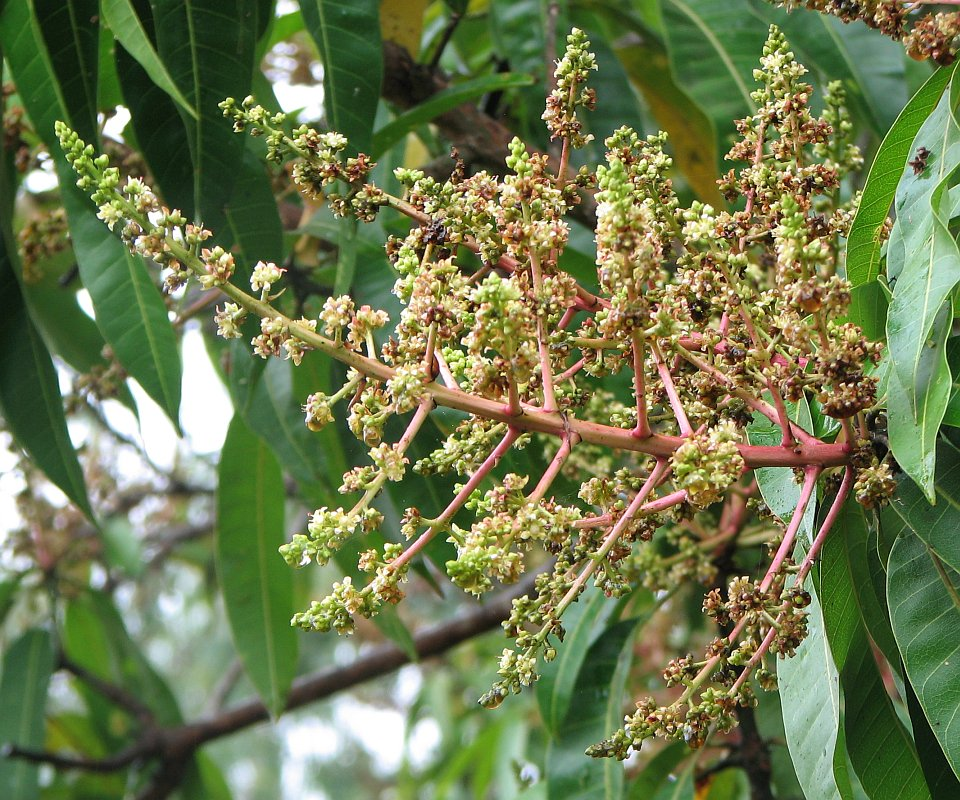
Mango (Mangifera sp.) inflorescence

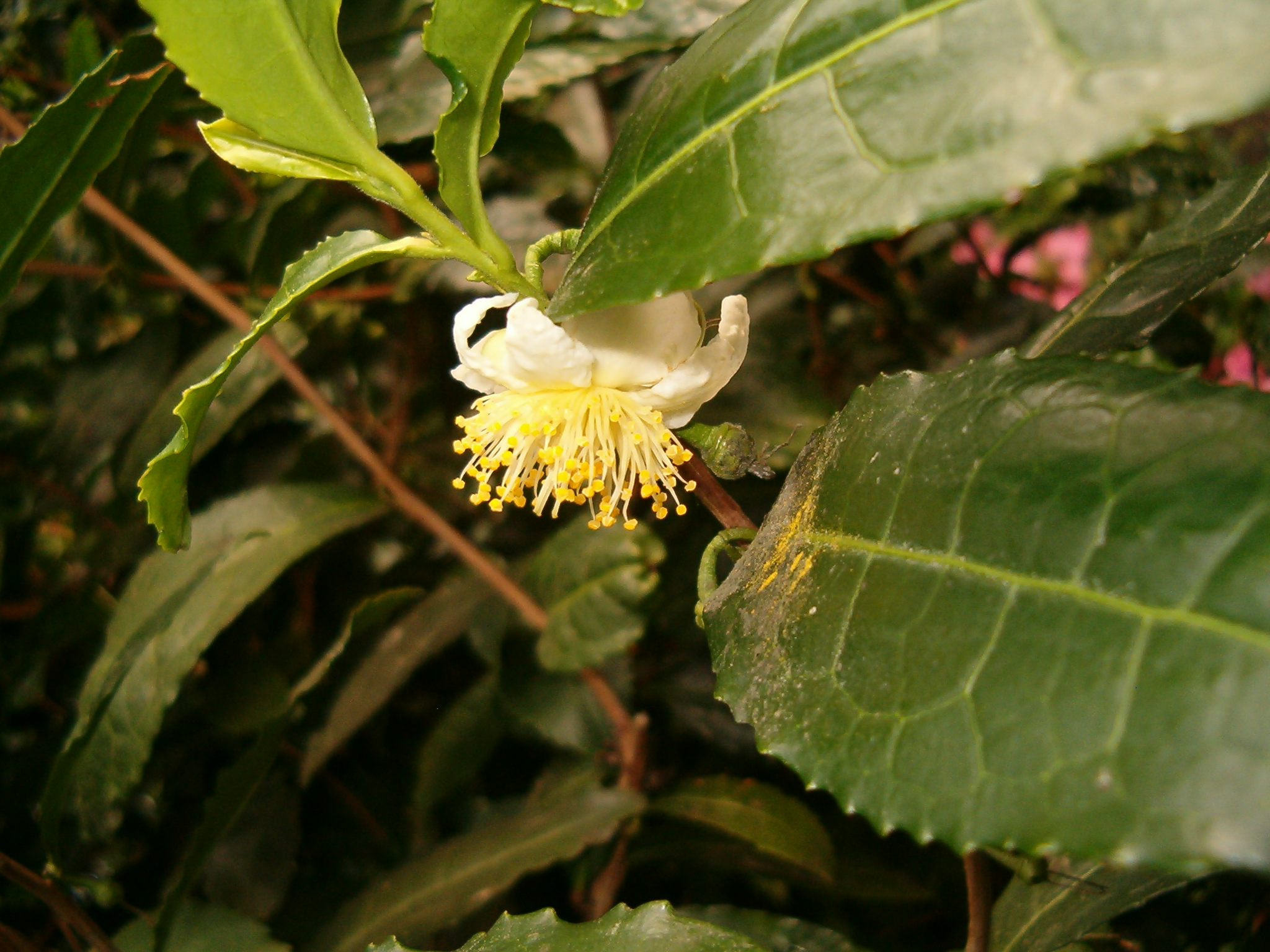
Tea (Camellia sinensis) flower

== In culture ==
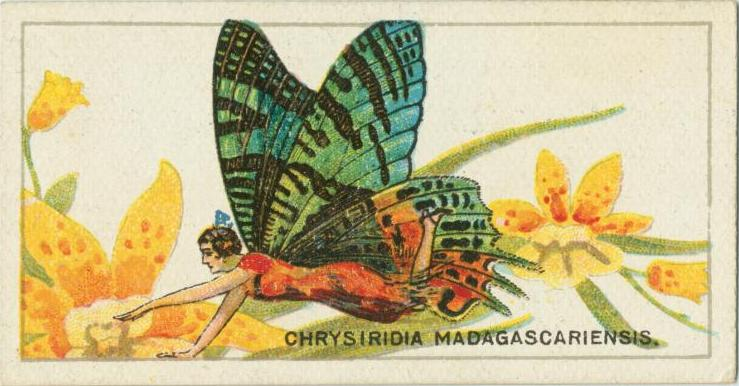
A cigarette card featuring a "Chrysiridia madagascariensis" fairy in 1928

This spectacular moth is considered one of the most impressive and beautiful Lepidoptera, rivalling almost any of the butterflies in brilliance of colouring and form. It is featured in most coffee table books on the Lepidoptera, and is much sought after by collectors. It is collected in the wild, and raised commercially for the international butterfly trade; its wings were used to make jewellery in the Victorian era. Only one of the four species of host plants, Omphalea oppositifolia, is used to raise the moth commercially, mainly using plants collected in the wild, but also some cultivated for the purpose.

The Madagascan sunset moth made its philatelic debut on a 100 CFA franc stamp released by Madagascar on March 25, 1960. Since then, the moth has been featured on more than ten standard-issue stamps and over twenty commemorative stamps.

In Malagasy, lolo is polysemous for "butterfly" or "moth" and "soul". There is little doubt that this is because a pupa resembles a covered corpse and that the adult emerges from it—like the soul from the body of the dead. The Malagasy people believe the soul of the dead or of ancestors appears in the form of a lepidopteran, and thus to attack it is to attack the ancestors.

== Footnotes ==
^1 The meaning of the specific epithet rhipheus was not given by the author Dru Drury. Possibilities include the Latin Montes Rhipheaus, Rhipheus "the most just of all the Trojans", and the centaur Rhipheus of Greek Mythology.
