= Gathynia ferrugata =

Scientific classification
- Kingdom: Animalia
- Phylum: Arthropoda
- Class: Insecta
- Order: Lepidoptera
- Family: Uraniidae
- Genus: Gathynia
- Species: G. ferrugata

Binomial name
- Gathynia ferrugata (Walker, 1866)

Synonyms
- Warreniplema ferrugata (Walker, 1866); Dirades ferrugata Walker, 1866

Species of moth

Gathynia ferrugata is a moth of the family Uraniidae first described by Francis Walker in 1866. It is found in Sri Lanka.
