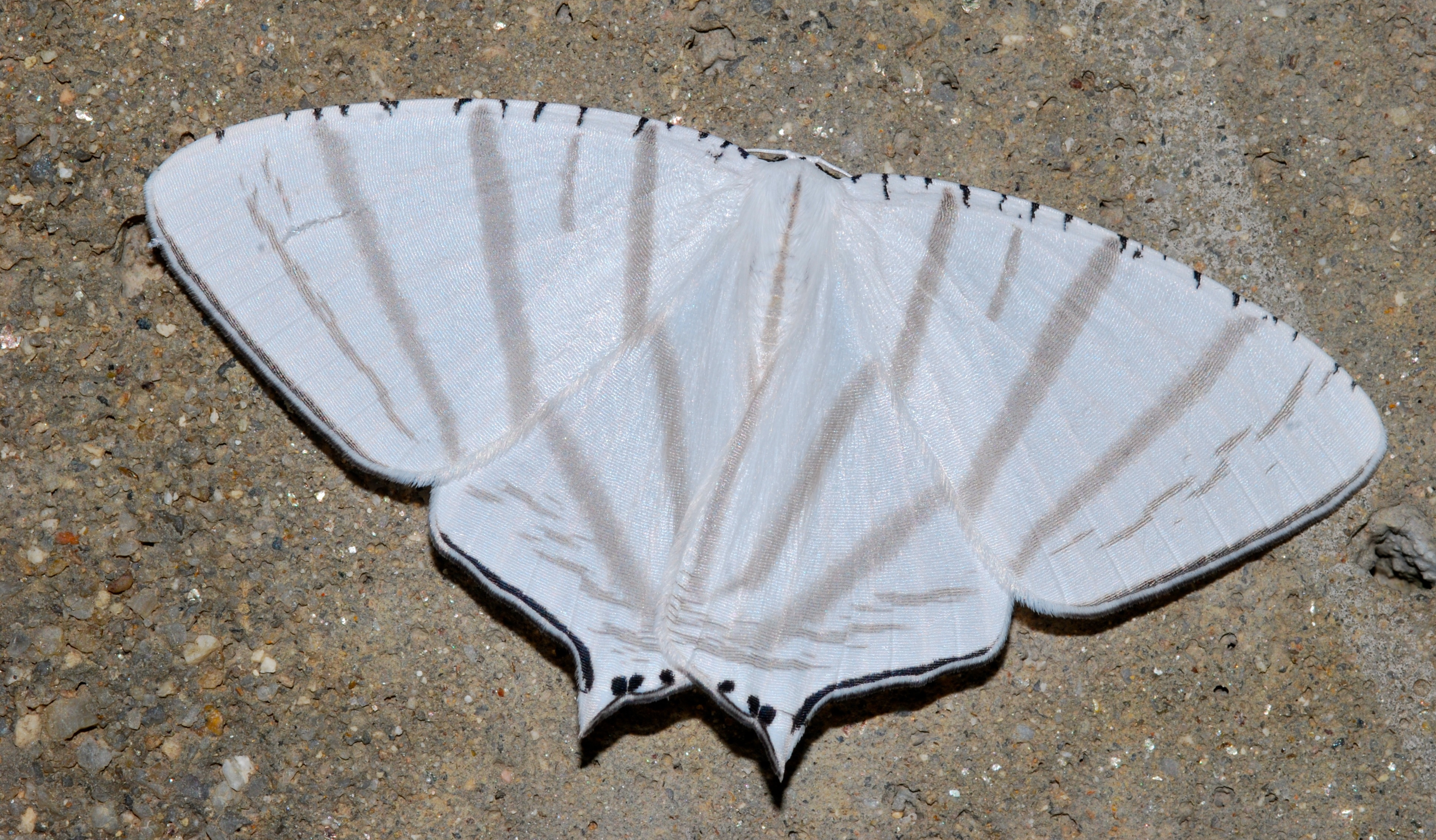
- Urapteroides astheniata from Kuala Tahan, Pahang, Malaysia

Scientific classification
- Kingdom: Animalia
- Phylum: Arthropoda
- Clade: Pancrustacea
- Class: Insecta
- Order: Lepidoptera
- Family: Uraniidae
- Subfamily: Uraniinae
- Genus: Urapteroides; Moore, 1888

= Urapteroides =

Genus of moths

Urapteroides is a genus of moths in the family Uraniidae.

== Distribution ==
The genus includes mainly nocturnal or crepuscular moths that are found from Nepal to the Indo-Australian tropics and parts of continental Southeast Asia. Species have a generally pale or nearly white coloration with darker markings.

== Description ==
Palpi slight and porrect (extending forward). Antennae of male thickened and flattened, of female simple. Forewings broad, veins 3 and 4 stalked, and veins 6 and 7 stalked. Veins 10 and 11 present. Hindwings with an angled tail at vein 4 and veins 3 and 4 stalked.

== Species ==
- Urapteroides anerces Meyrick, 1886 (Fiji)
- Urapteroides astheniata (Guenée, 1857) (Himalaya to New Guinea, Queensland)
- Urapteroides diana Swinhoe (Peninsular Malaysia) (possibly a form of U. astheniata)
- Urapteroides equestraria Boisduval
- Urapteroides hermaea Druce, 1888
- Urapteroides hyemalis Butler, 1887 (Solomons, Vanuatu)
- Urapteroides malgassaria Mabille, 1878
- Urapteroides recurvata Warren, 1898 (Kenya, South Africa, Tanzania)
- Urapteroides swinhoei Rothschild
- Urapteroides urapterina Butler, 1877
