= Gathynia miraria =

Scientific classification
- Kingdom: Animalia
- Phylum: Arthropoda
- Class: Insecta
- Order: Lepidoptera
- Family: Uraniidae
- Genus: Gathynia
- Species: G. miraria

Binomial name
- Gathynia miraria Walker, 1862

Species of moth

Gathynia miraria is a moth of the family Uraniidae.
