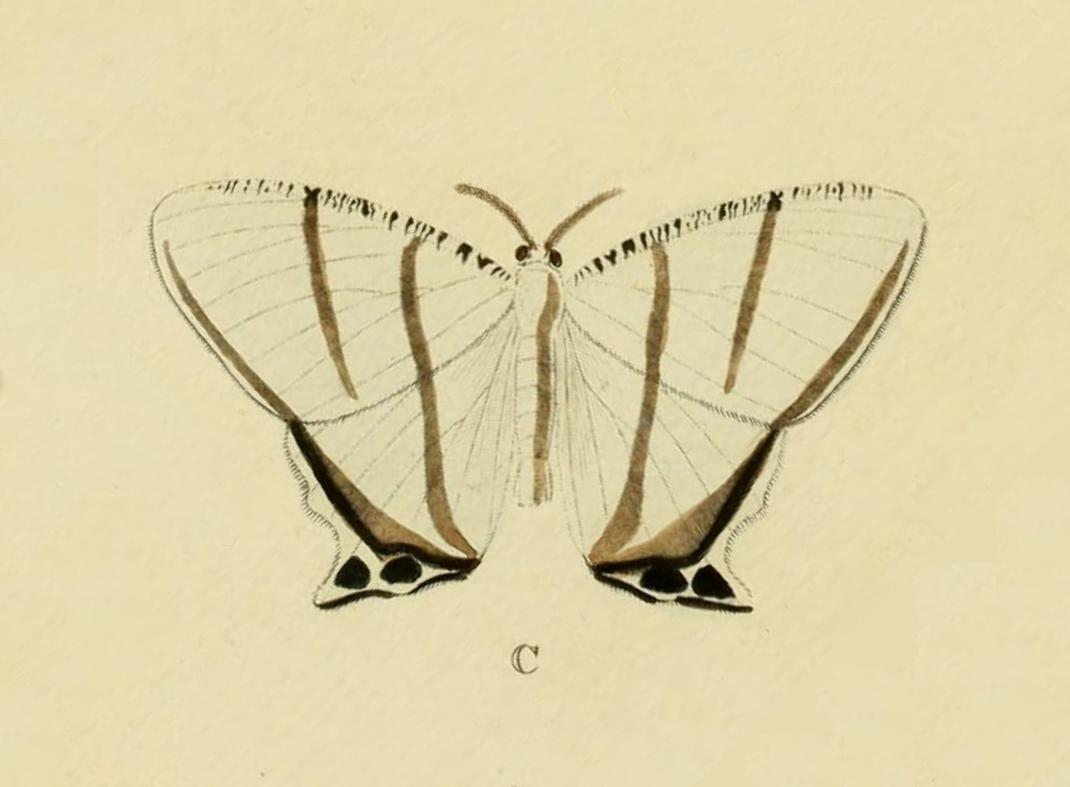
- Cyphura geminia from Ambon Island \

Scientific classification
- Kingdom: Animalia
- Phylum: Arthropoda
- Clade: Pancrustacea
- Class: Insecta
- Order: Lepidoptera
- Family: Uraniidae
- Subfamily: Uraniinae
- Genus: Cyphura; Warren, 1902

= Cyphura =

Genus of moths

Cyphura is a genus of moths in the family Uraniidae. The genus was erected by William Warren in 1902.

== Distribution ==
The genus includes primarily nocturnal or crepuscular moths that are found in the Australasian tropical areas. Species have a generally pale or nearly-white colouration with brown or dark patterns. The larvae live in webbing of the host plant.

== Species ==
- Cyphura albisecta Warren
- Cyphura approximans Swinhoe, 1916
- Cyphura atramentaria Warren
- Cyphura bifasciata Butler, 1879
- Cyphura catenulata Warren, 1902
- Cyphura caudiferaria Boisduval
- Cyphura clarissima Butler
- Cyphura costalis Butler
- Cyphura dealbata Warren
- Cyphura destrigata Kirsch
- Cyphura extensa Rothschild
- Cyphura falka Swinhoe
- Cyphura geminia (Cramer, 1777) (Ambon Island)
- Cyphura gutturalis Swinhoe, 1916
- Cyphura latimarginata Swinhoe, 1902
- Cyphura maxima Strand
- Cyphura multistrigaria Warren
- Cyphura mundaria Walker
- Cyphura pannata Felder
- Cyphura pardata Warren
- Cyphura phantasma Felder
- Cyphura pieridaria Warren, 1902
- Cyphura reducta Joicey & Talbot
- Cyphura semialba Warren
- Cyphura semiobsoleta Warren
- Cyphura subsimilis Warren, 1902
- Cyphura swinhoei Joicey, 1917
- Cyphura urapteroides Joicey
