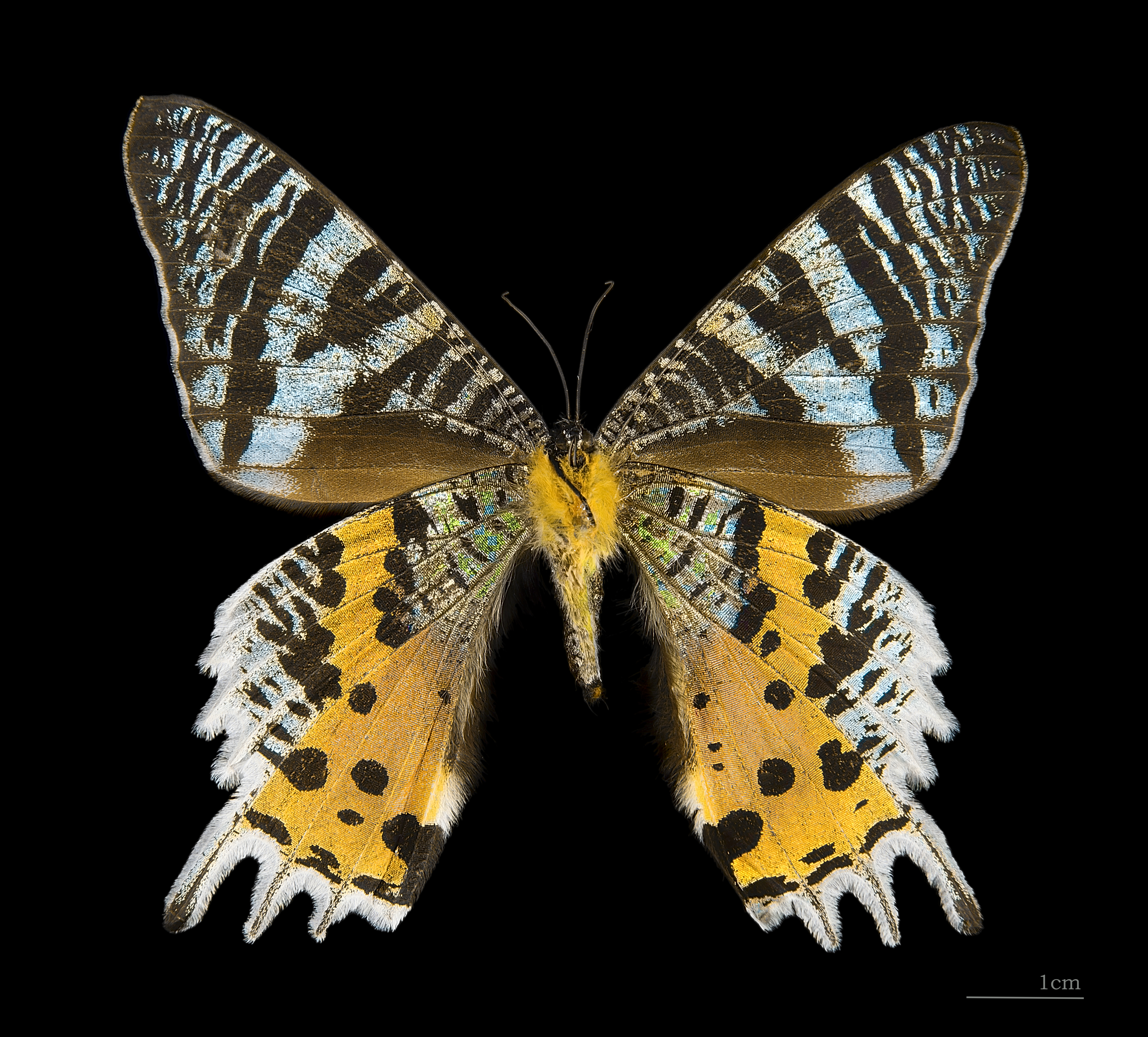
- Chrysiridia rhipheus from Madagascar

Scientific classification
- Kingdom: Animalia
- Phylum: Arthropoda
- Clade: Pancrustacea
- Class: Insecta
- Order: Lepidoptera
- Family: Uraniidae
- Subfamily: Uraniinae
- Genus: Chrysiridia; Hübner, [1823]

Synonyms
- Thaliura Duncan, 1837; Rhipheus Swainson, 1833

= Chrysiridia =

Genus of moths

Chrysiridia is a genus of uraniid moths from Africa including Madagascar. The genus was erected by Jacob Hübner in 1823. They are diurnal and strongly marked with iridescent colours.

== Species ==
Listed alphabetically:

- Chrysiridia croesus (Gerstaecker, 1871) – African sunset moth, Croesus moth (East Africa)
- Chrysiridia rhipheus (Drury, 1773) or Chrysiridia madagascariensis (Lesson, 1831) – Madagascan sunset moth (Madagascar)

An additional species, Chrysiridia prometheus (Drapiez, 1819), supposedly from the isolated South Atlantic island of Saint Helena, has been described, but this was already found to be erroneous more than 100 years ago and no recent authority recognize it as valid.
