= Monobolodes parvinigrata =

Scientific classification
- Kingdom: Animalia
- Phylum: Arthropoda
- Clade: Pancrustacea
- Class: Insecta
- Order: Lepidoptera
- Family: Uraniidae
- Genus: Monobolodes
- Species: M. parvinigrata

Binomial name
- Monobolodes parvinigrata Holloway, 1998

Species of moth

Monobolodes parvinigrata is a moth of the family Uraniidae first described by Jeremy Daniel Holloway in 1998. It is found in Borneo and Sri Lanka.

As in most Lepidoptera, the female is slightly larger than the male. The wingspan of the male is 9 mm and the female is 10 mm. Wings of the male occur with shades of grey and black. Postmedial is straight. The tail of the hindwing is blunt.
