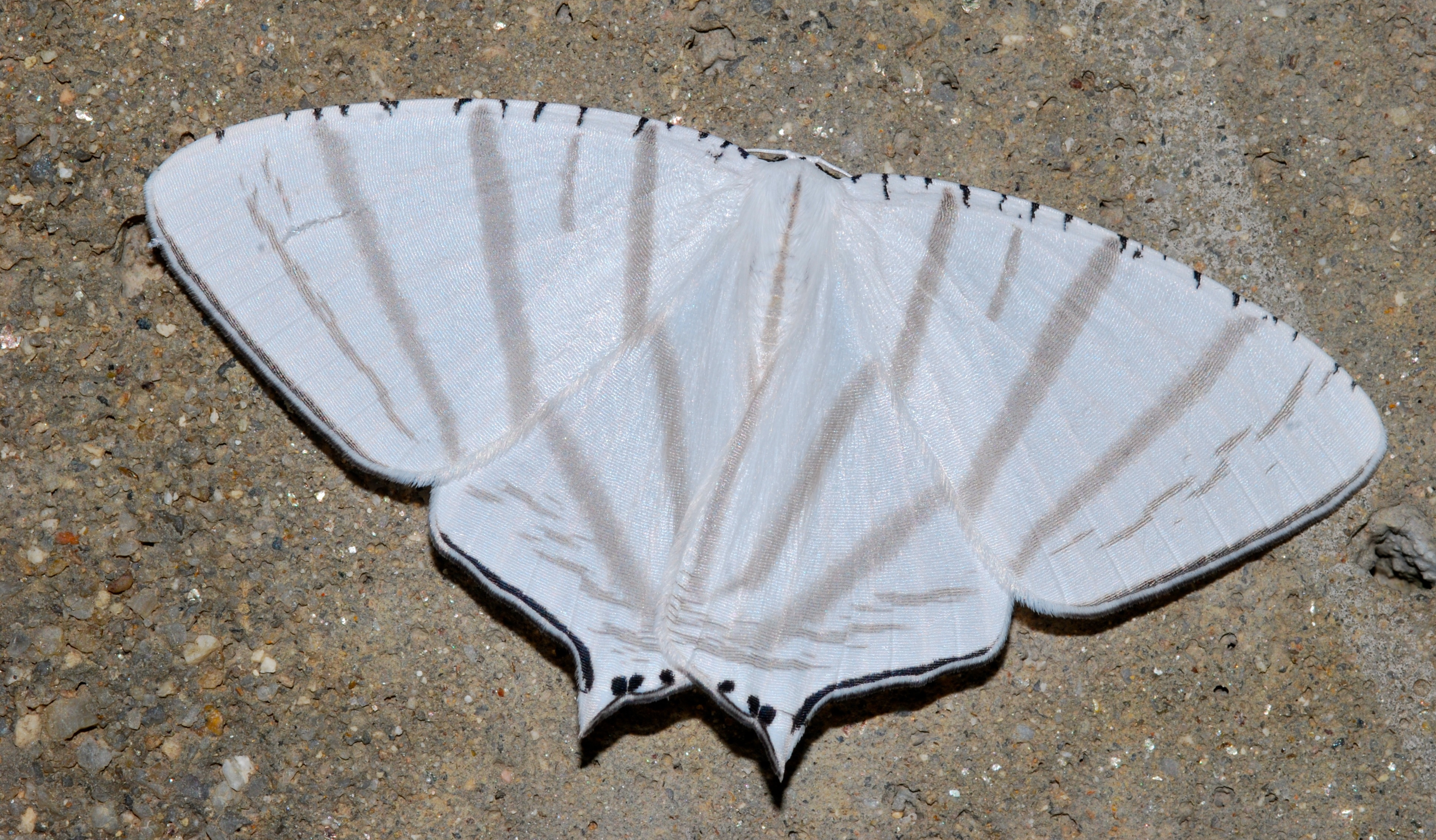

Scientific classification
- Kingdom: Animalia
- Phylum: Arthropoda
- Class: Insecta
- Order: Lepidoptera
- Family: Uraniidae
- Genus: Urapteroides
- Species: U. astheniata

Binomial name
- Urapteroides astheniata (Guenée, 1857)

Synonyms
- Micronia astheniata Guenée, 1857

= Urapteroides astheniata =

Species of moth

Urapteroides astheniata is a moth of the family Uraniidae first described by Achille Guenée in 1857. It is found in south-east Asia, from India, Sri Lanka to Fiji, including New Guinea and the tropical north of Australia.

== Description ==
The wingspan is about 60–76 mm. Body white. Palpi with a black line on the upperside. A black frontal line and spot found on vertex of head. Forewings with some black strigae from the costa. Six oblique fuscous bands, one sub-basal, another on discocellulars, the others medial, postmedial, sub-marginal and marginal. Some fuscous striae found on each side of the sub-marginal band. Hindwings with a fuscous band on inner margin joined at anal angle by a band from the upper angle of cell and almost met by one from the costa beyond the middle. Some submarginal striae can be seen. A black marginal line runs from the apex to the tail, and a very narrow line with three spots inside it from the tail to anal angle. Cilia black tipped.

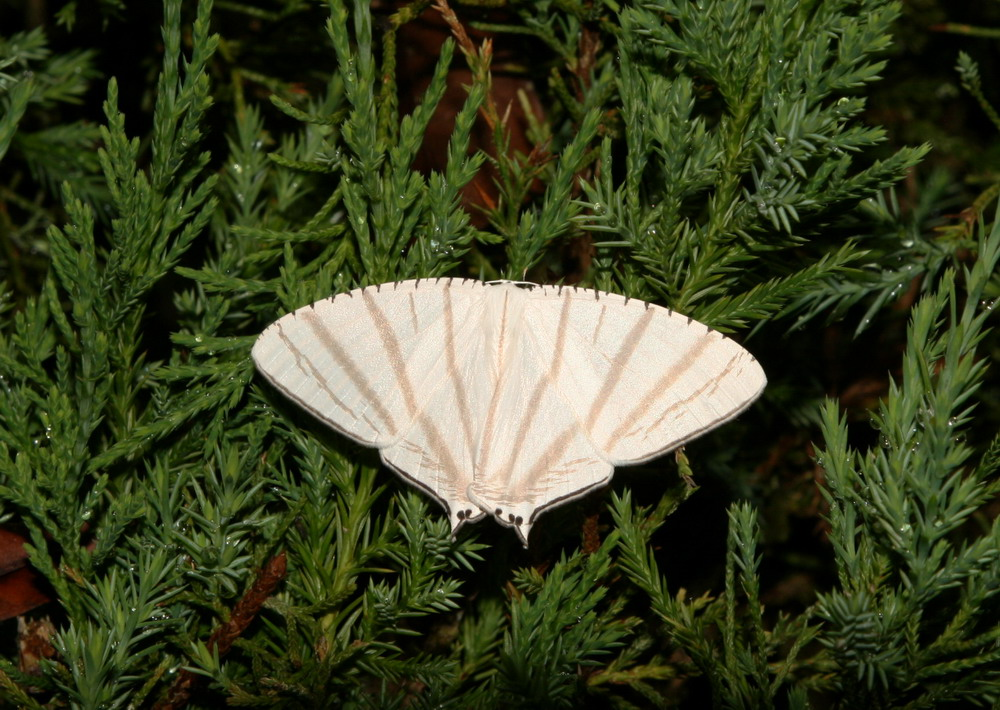

Larva pale reddish yellow, tinged green, with reddish transverse stripes dorsally. Three comma-like greenish markings found centrally on each segment. Last instars are more greenish with variable markings. Head and prothorax glossy greenish. Spiracles dark. The larvae feed on Endospermum species.
