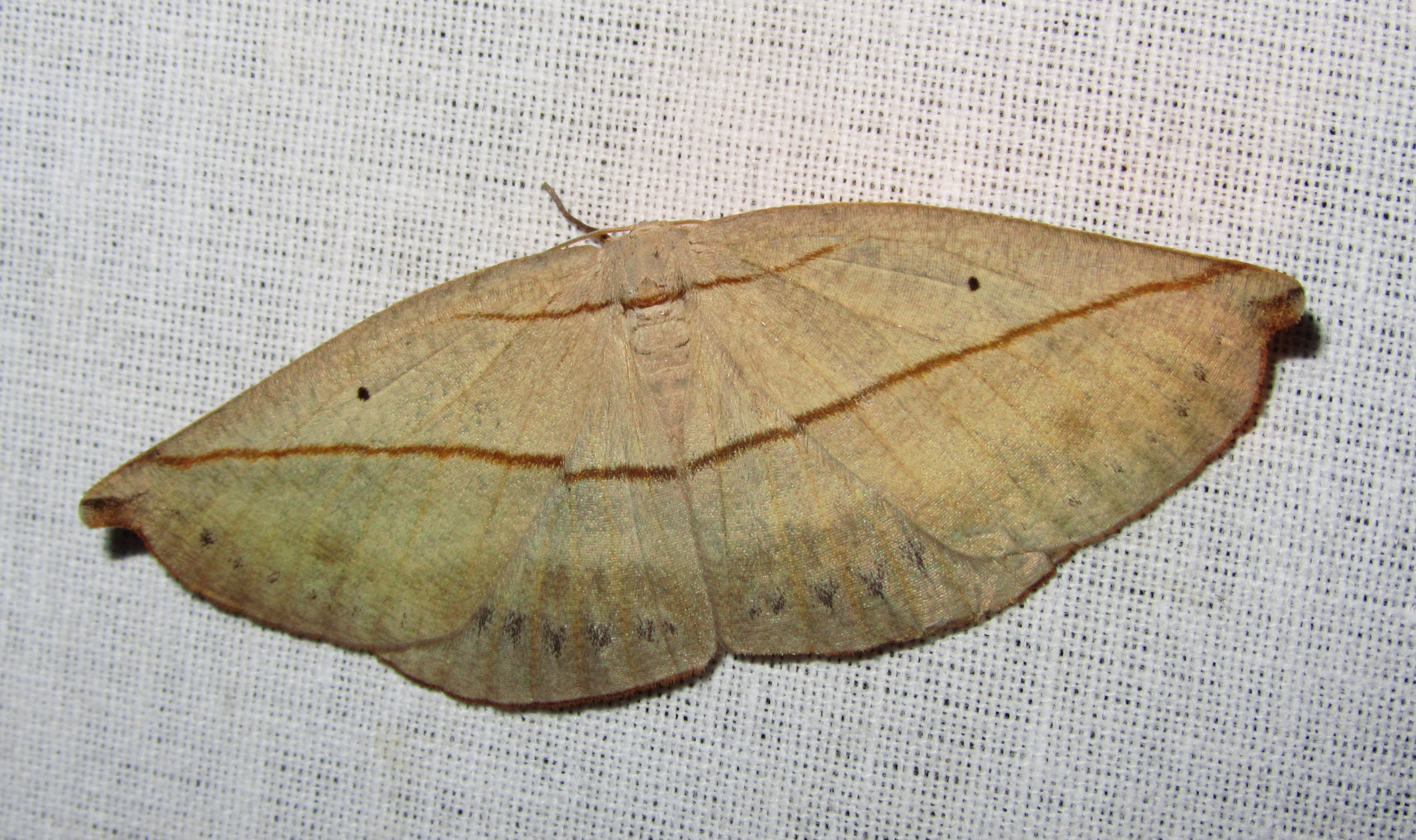

Scientific classification
- Kingdom: Animalia
- Phylum: Arthropoda
- Clade: Pancrustacea
- Class: Insecta
- Order: Lepidoptera
- Family: Uraniidae
- Subfamily: Auzeinae; Minet, 1994

Genera
- Auzea; Brachydecetia; Decetia

= Auzeinae =

Subfamily of moths

The Auzeinae are a subfamily of the lepidopteran family Uraniidae.
