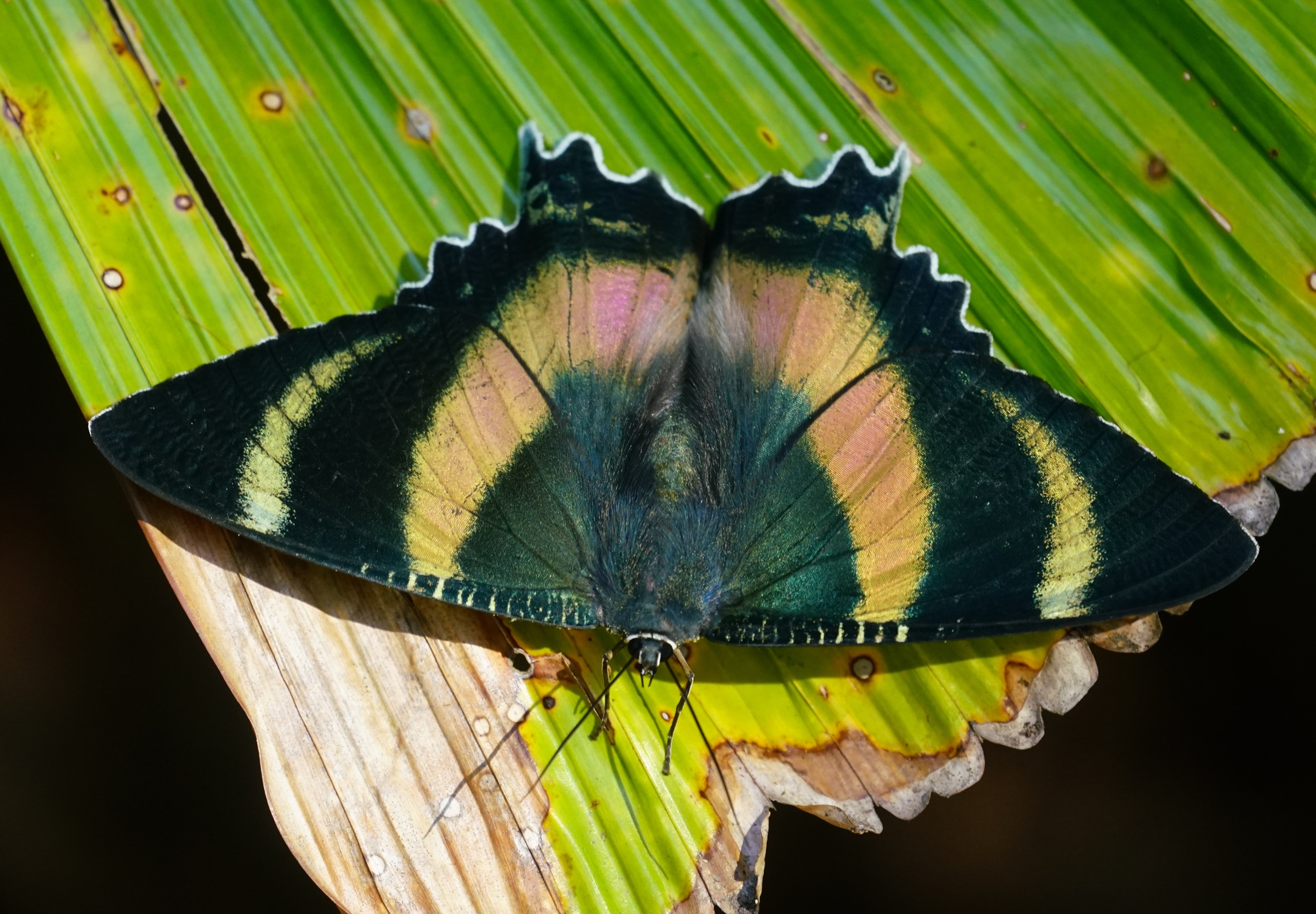

Scientific classification
- Kingdom: Animalia
- Phylum: Arthropoda
- Class: Insecta
- Order: Lepidoptera
- Family: Uraniidae
- Genus: Alcides
- Species: A. metaurus

Binomial name
- Alcides metaurus (Linnaeus, 1763)

Synonyms
- Nyctalemon metaurus Hopffer, 1856; Nyctalemon zodiaca Butler, 1869; Alcides zodiaca

= Alcides metaurus =

Species of moth

Alcides metaurus or North Queensland Day Moth is a moth of the family Uraniidae. It is known from the tropical north of Queensland, Australia.

== Description ==
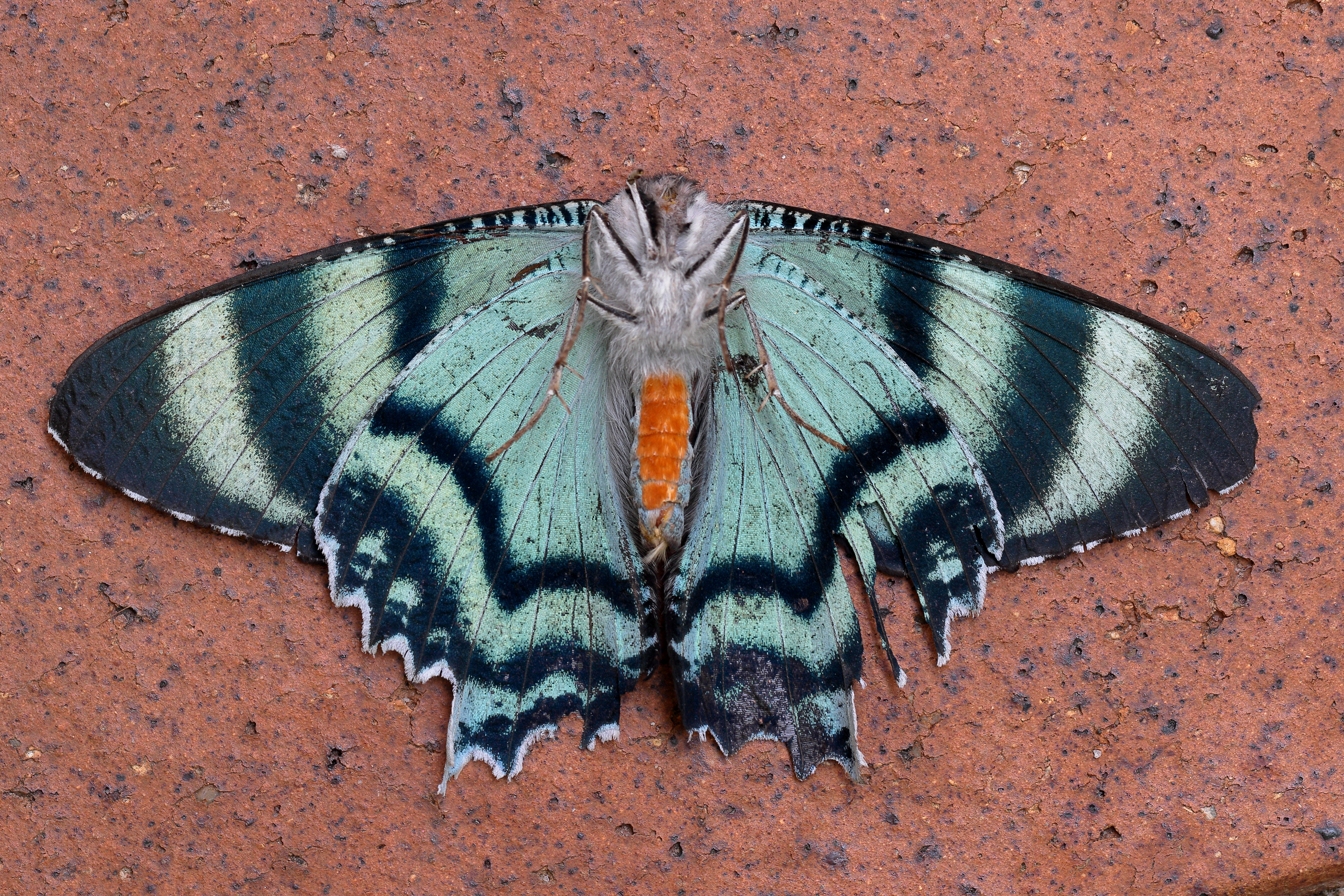
Alcides metaurus ventral view

The wingspan is about 100 mm.

The larvae feed on various Euphorbiaceae species, including Endospermum medullosum, E. myrmecophilum, and Omphalea queenslandiae.

== Distribution ==
It is found in Queensland and around New Guinea.
