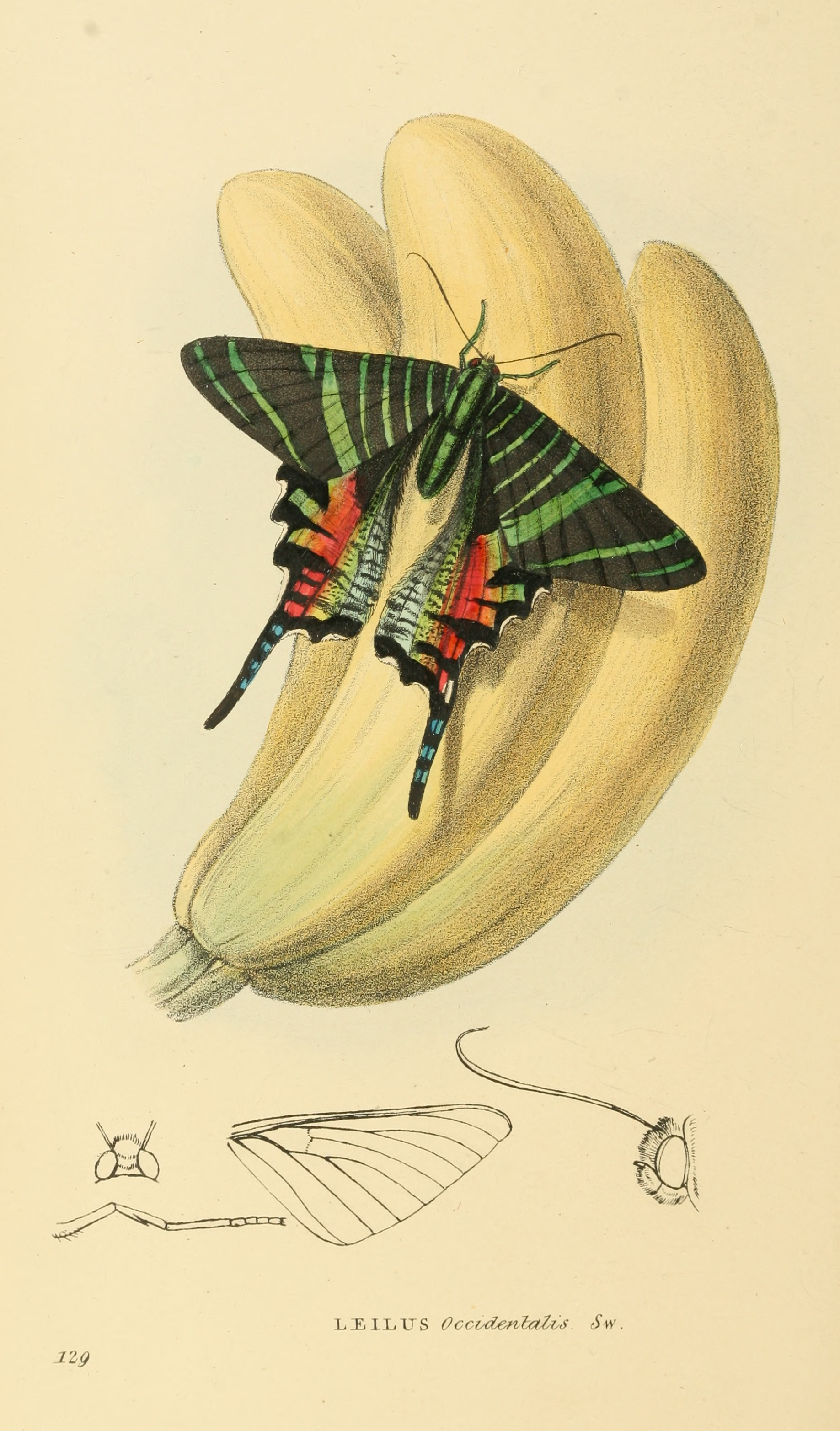
- 1829 illustration of the now extinct Urania sloanus by William Swainson

Conservation status
- Extinct (c. 1894-1908)

Scientific classification
- Kingdom: Animalia
- Phylum: Arthropoda
- Class: Insecta
- Order: Lepidoptera
- Family: Uraniidae
- Genus: Urania
- Species: †U. sloanus

Binomial name
- †Urania sloanus (Cramer, 1779)
- Former range in red (Jamaica)

Synonyms
- Papilio sloanus (original combination); Cydimon sloanus; Leilus occidentalis

= Urania sloanus =

Extinct species of moth

Urania sloanus, or Sloane's urania, was a species of moth of the family Uraniidae endemic to Jamaica. It was last reported in 1894 or 1895, but possibly survived until at least 1908. The species was first described by Pieter Cramer in 1779.

The specific epithet sloanus honours Sir Hans Sloane (1660–1753), an English collector whose collection became the foundation of the British Museum.

== Description ==
This extinct Urania species was black with iridescent red, blue and green markings. The iridescent parts of the wings do not have pigment; as determined by optical analysis on the species Urania fulgens belonging to the same genus. The color originates from refraction of light by the ribbon-like scales covering the moth's wings.

Urania sloanus is considered "the most spectacular Urania species". As most species of the subfamily Uraniinae, it was a day-flying moth while most moths are active at night; its bright colors advertised, as a warning, the fact that it was also toxic. "Urania sloanus species had orange and green neon coloring spread through its wings" (Smith, 1991). These components facilitate the future discovery of the species if they are found to still be existing. The vibrant coloring makes the species easily identifiable to researchers and ecologists studying the species.

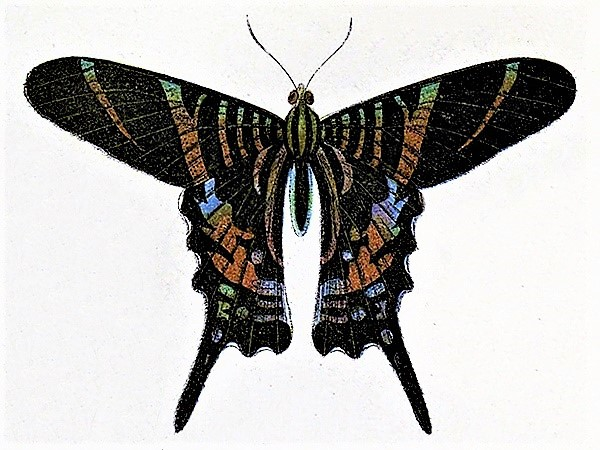
Urania sloanus as illustrated in A Handbook to the Order Lepidoptera by W. F. Kirby

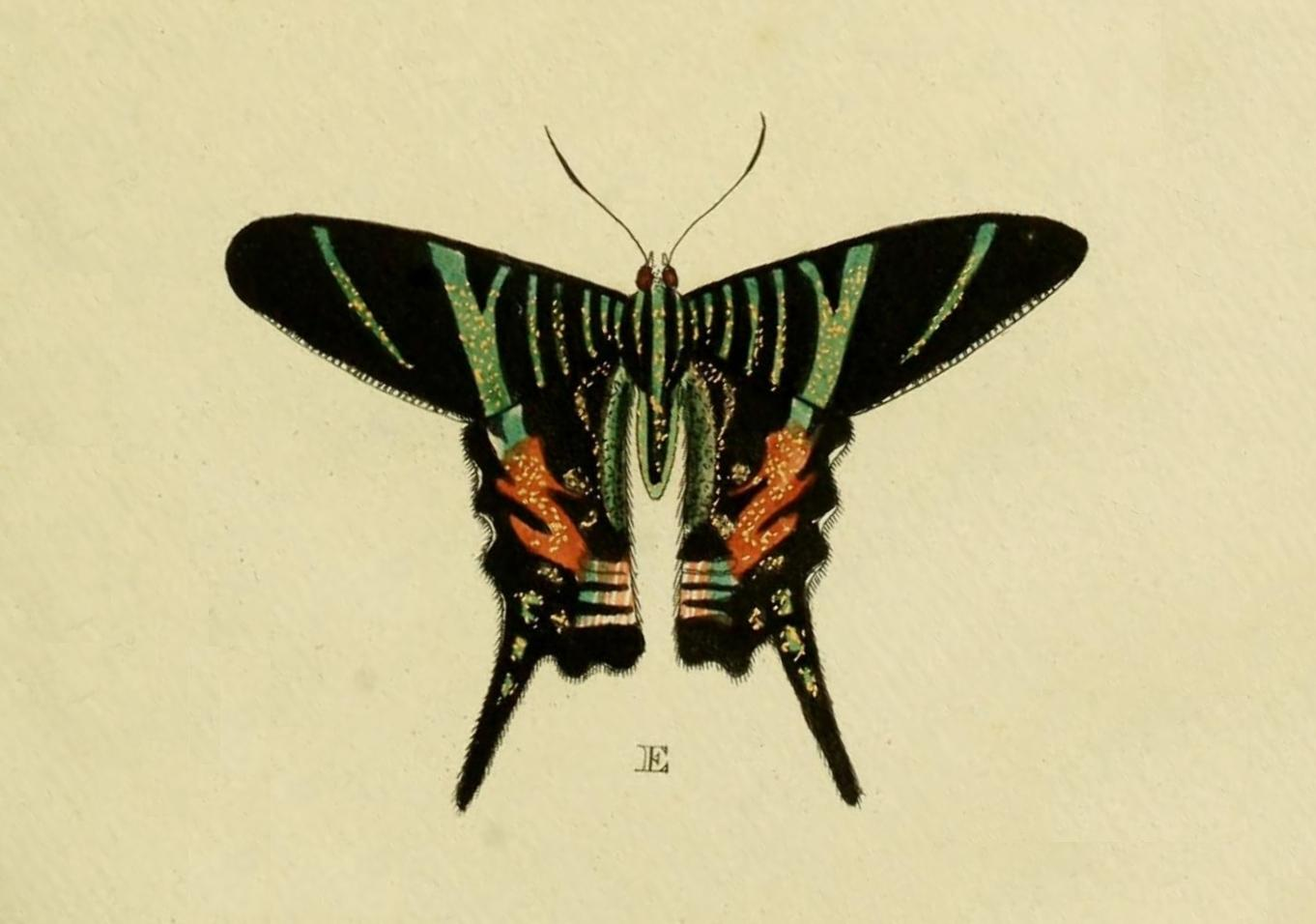
Illustration from Pieter Cramer and Caspar Stoll's De uitlandsche kapellen: voorkomende in de drie waereld-deelen Asia, Africa en America

== Extinction ==
Based on current knowledge of extant uraniine species, it is likely that Sloane's urania migrated between patches of host plants, after population explosions locally defoliated them. This probably required relatively large, intact areas of lowland forest.

Habitat loss when Jamaica's lowland rainforests were cleared and converted to agricultural land during the colonial era may have contributed to its extinction, although large parts of primary forest still remain. This specific species of moths experienced a decline in their population because of a drastic change in environmental components. Like other members of the genus Urania, periodic swarms of moths were separated by years of great scarcity. The U. sloanus species faced significant threats that imposed less than sustainable environments for the species survival. U. sloanus species experienced the loss of their main larval host through habitat destruction this was directly linked to abrupt agricultural changes, hurricanes, and other natural disasters (Nazari, 2016). As the question of why did this species become extinct is further examined, we can conclude that the species was forced into unsustainable and unadaptable conditions that would inevitably lead to a loss in the overall population and survival rates of the species.
