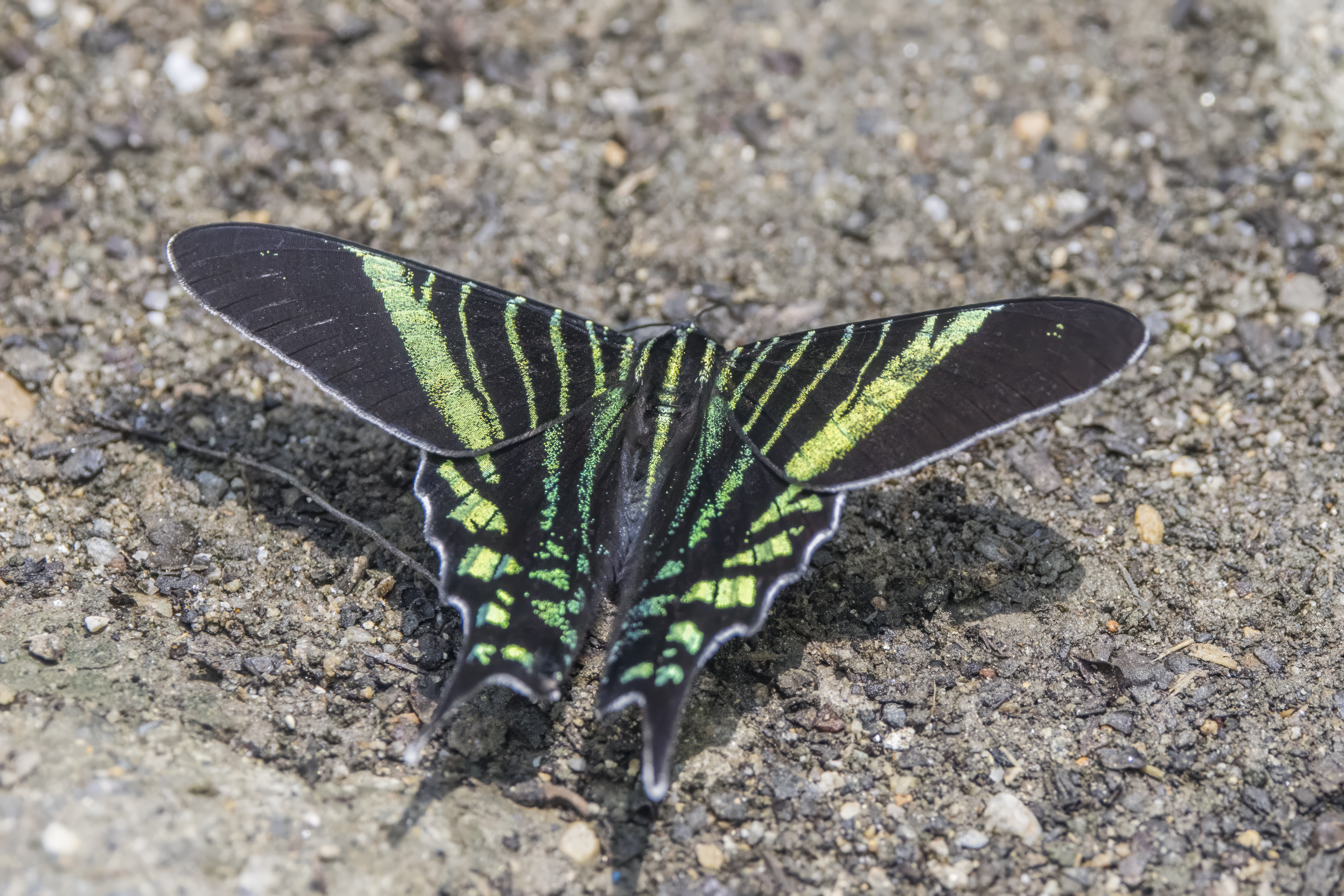
- Upperside

Scientific classification
- Kingdom: Animalia
- Phylum: Arthropoda
- Clade: Pancrustacea
- Class: Insecta
- Order: Lepidoptera
- Family: Uraniidae
- Genus: Urania
- Species: U. fulgens

Binomial name
- Urania fulgens (Walker, 1854)

Synonyms
- Cydimon cacica Guenee, 1857

= Urania fulgens =

Urania swallowtail moth

Species of moth

Urania fulgens, the urania swallowtail moth or green page moth, is a day-flying moth of the family Uraniidae. The species was first described by Francis Walker in 1854. It is found from Veracruz, Mexico, through Central America to northwestern South America (west of the Andes and south to Ecuador). It is highly migratory and has been recorded as a vagrant to the US state of Texas.

It is sometimes confused with the similar U. leilus, but that species is found east of the Andes in South America, is slightly larger, and has more white to the "tail". The two have been treated as conspecific.

As appears to be the case for all Urania, the larvae of U. fulgens feed exclusively on the toxic Omphalea species.

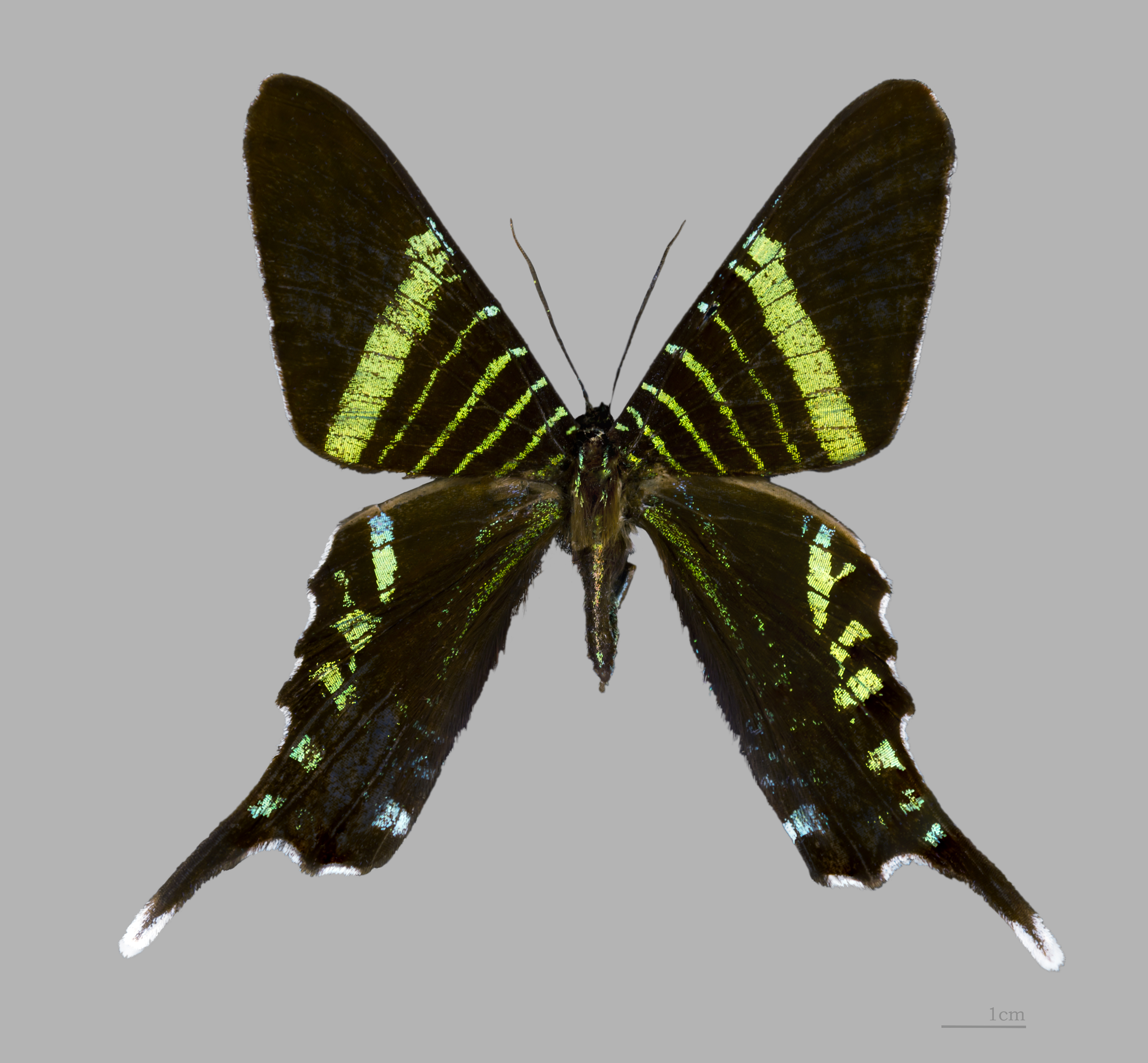
upperside

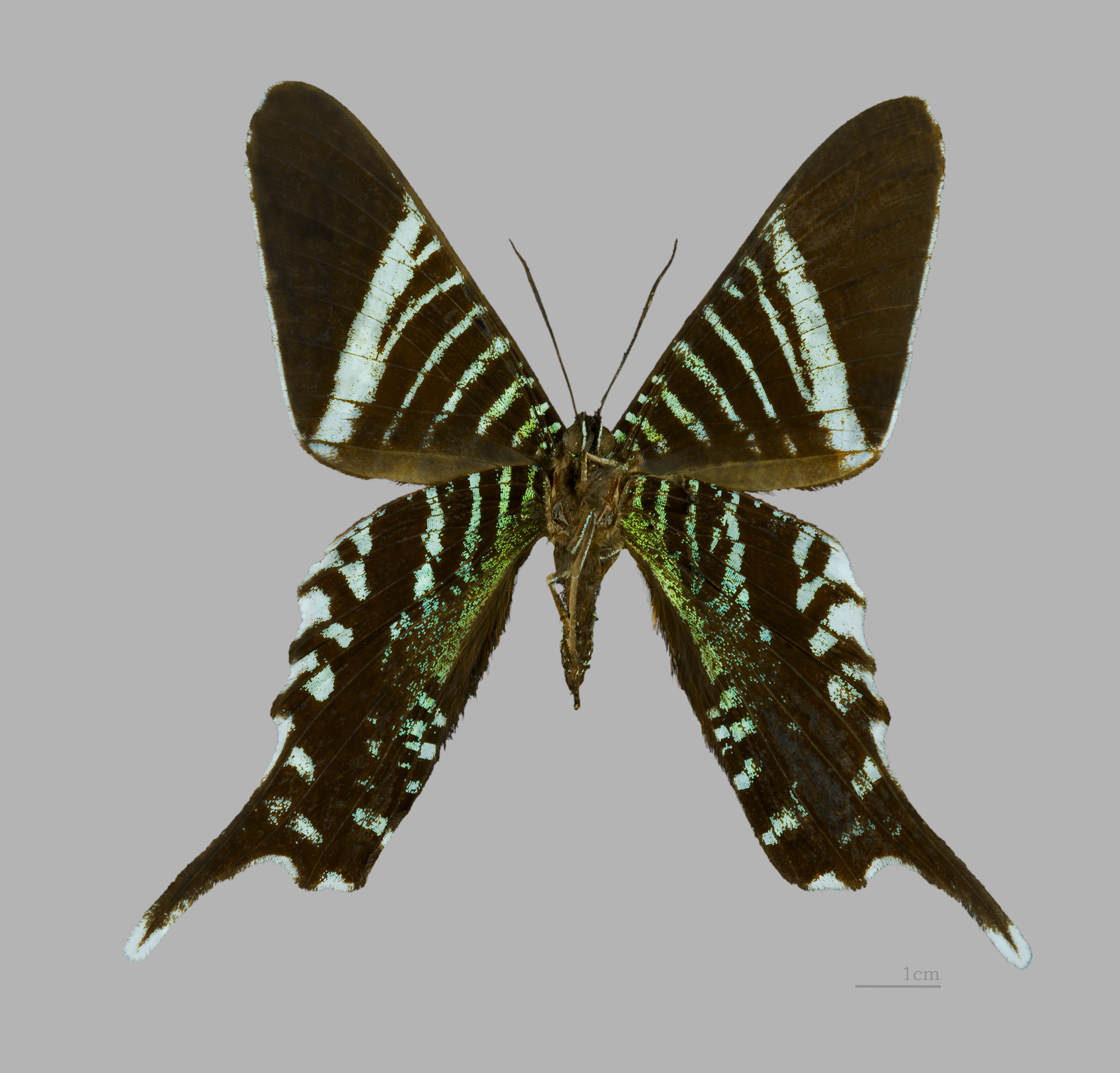
underside
