= Urapteritra falcifera =

Scientific classification
- Kingdom: Animalia
- Phylum: Arthropoda
- Clade: Pancrustacea
- Class: Insecta
- Order: Lepidoptera
- Family: Uraniidae
- Genus: Urapteritra
- Species: U. falcifera

Binomial name
- Urapteritra falcifera (Weymer, 1892)

Synonyms
- Strophidia falcicera Weymer, 1892

Species of moth

Urapteritra falcifera is a moth of the family Uraniidae first described by Weymer in 1892. It is found in eastern Africa and South Africa.

The length of its body is 12 mm, length of its forewings 23 mm. The forewings are white with three brownish-yellow stripes.
