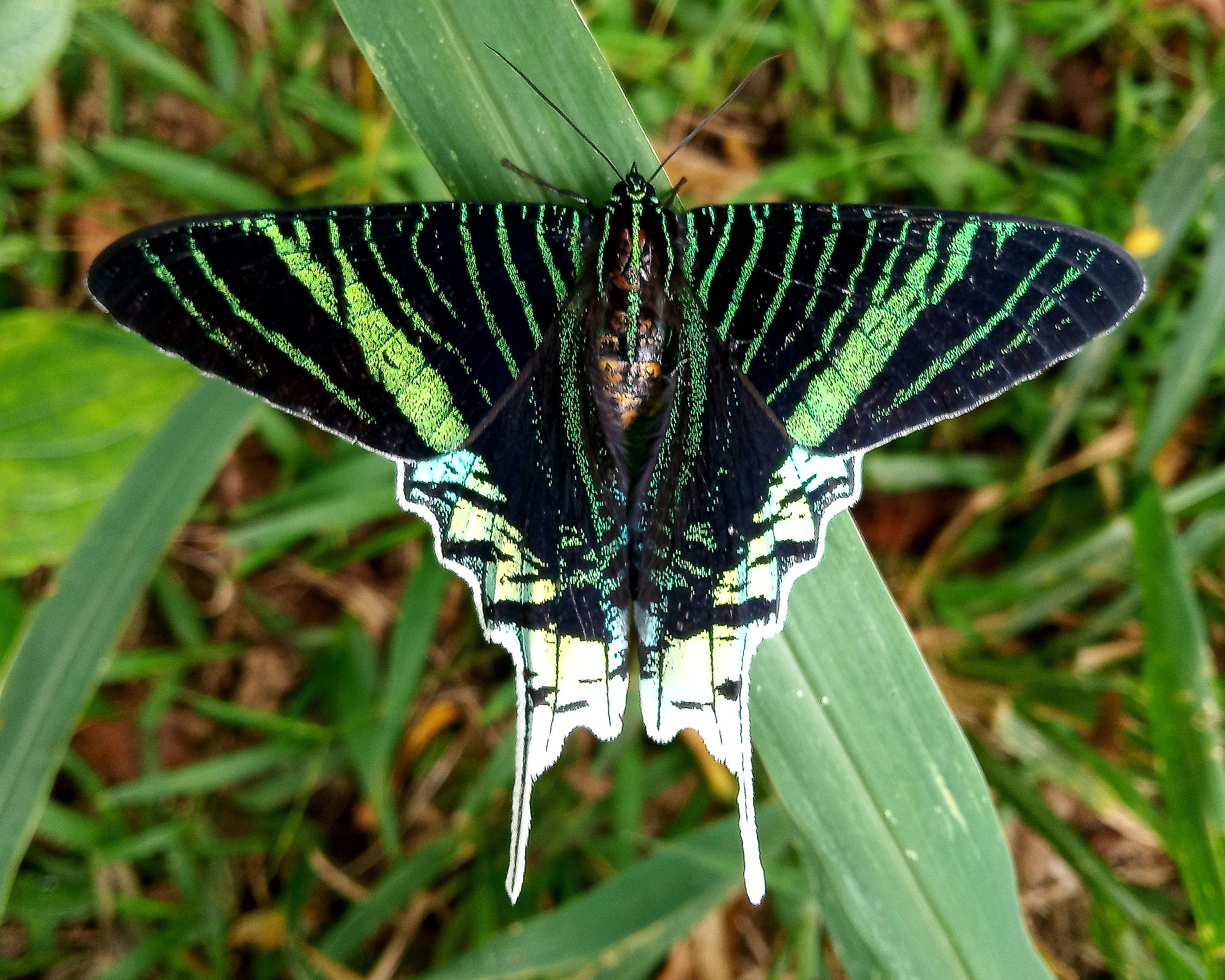
- Urania leilus, Guadeloupe

Scientific classification
- Kingdom: Animalia
- Phylum: Arthropoda
- Class: Insecta
- Order: Lepidoptera
- Family: Uraniidae
- Genus: Urania
- Species: U. leilus

Binomial name
- Urania leilus (Linnaeus, 1758)

Synonyms
- Papilio leilus Linnaeus, 1758; Papilio leilaria Hübner, [1807] (unj. emend.)

= Urania leilus =

Green-banded urania

Species of moth

Urania leilus, the green-banded urania, is a day-flying moth of the family Uraniidae. The species was first described by Carl Linnaeus in his 1758 10th edition of Systema Naturae. It is found in tropical South America east of the Andes, especially in the Amazon rainforest. Its range includes Suriname, Guyana, French Guiana, eastern Colombia, Venezuela, eastern Ecuador, Brazil, northern Bolivia, eastern Peru, as well as the island of Trinidad. It has been recorded as a vagrant to the central and northern Lesser Antilles, such as St. Kitts, Barbados and Dominica. Their preferred habitat consists of riverbanks, in primary and secondary rainforest, at elevations between sea level and about 800 m (2,600 ft).

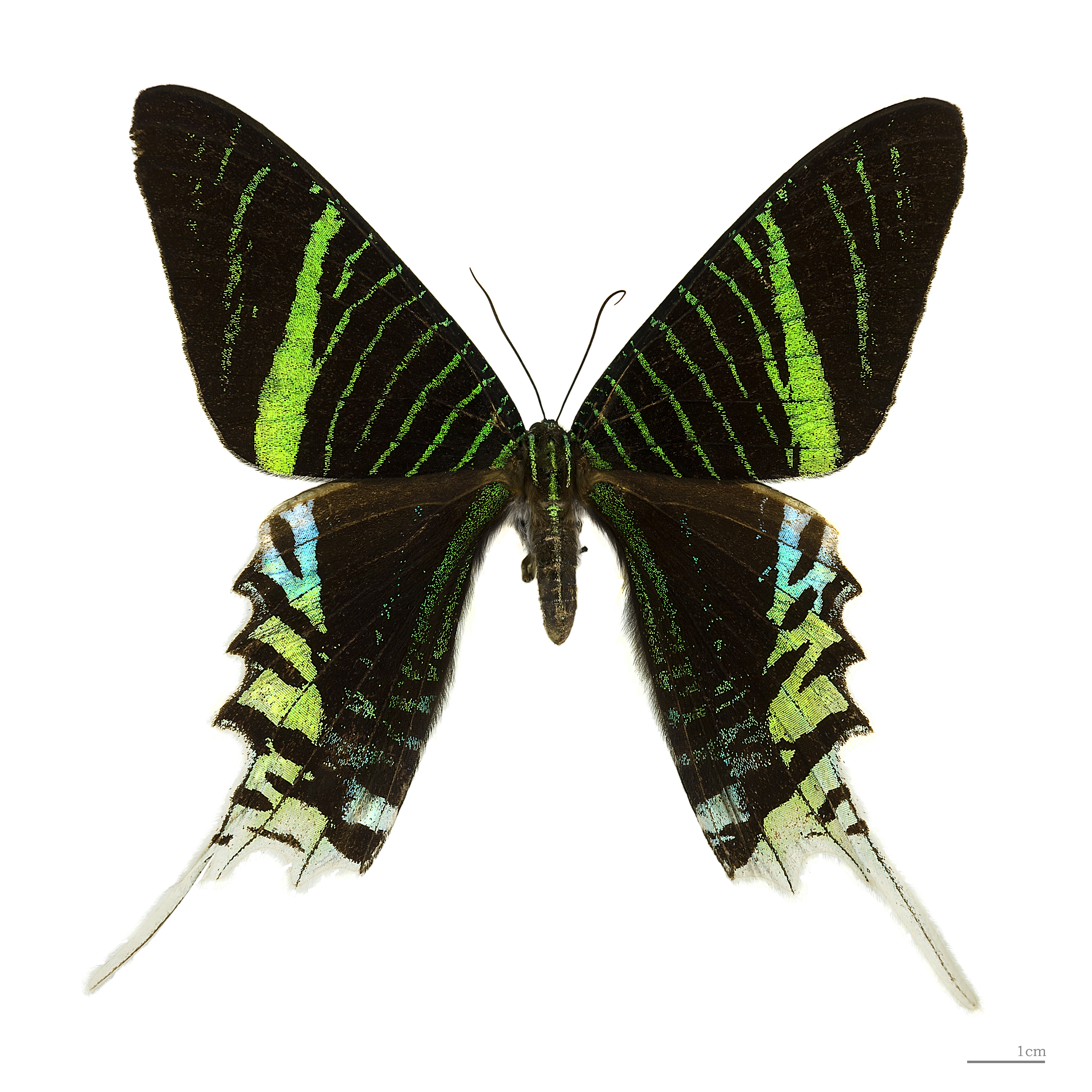
Dorsal side

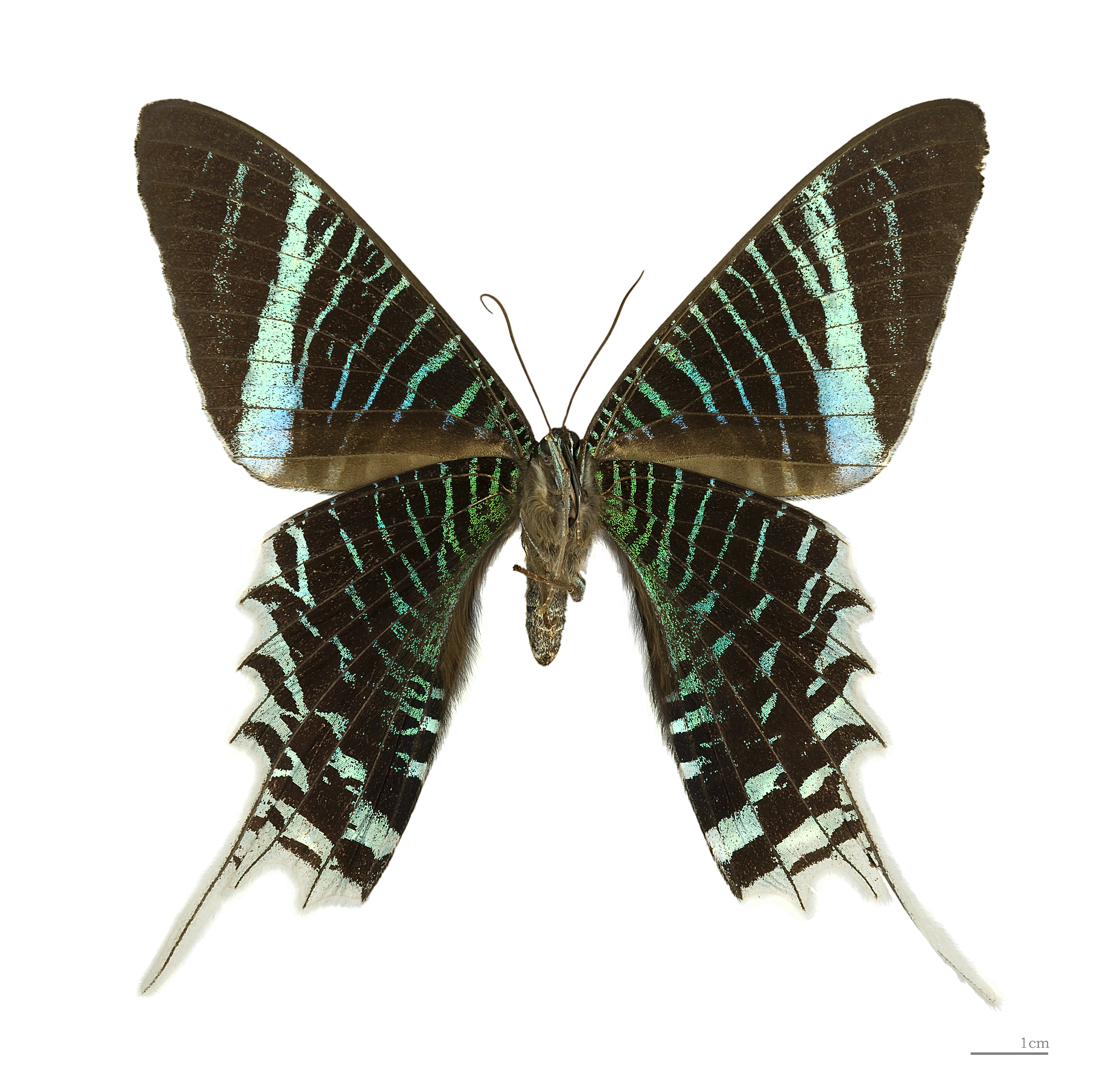
Ventral side

U. leilus is sometimes confused with the similar-looking U. fulgens, but that species has a separate distribution (west of the Andes in South America, Central America and Mexico) and is slightly smaller with less white to the "tail". Historically, the two have been treated as conspecific. It is theorized that these moths were once part of a single species, but were split into two when the Andean mountains formed about 5–2.7 million years ago, resulting in them becoming allopatric species. Whereas U. leilus is highly dependent in high rainfall, U. fulgens also tolerates habitats with somewhat lower rainfall levels.

The wingspan of U. leilus is about 70 mm (2.8 in). As appears to be the case for all Urania, the larvae of U. leilus feed exclusively on leaves of the toxic spurge Omphalea.
