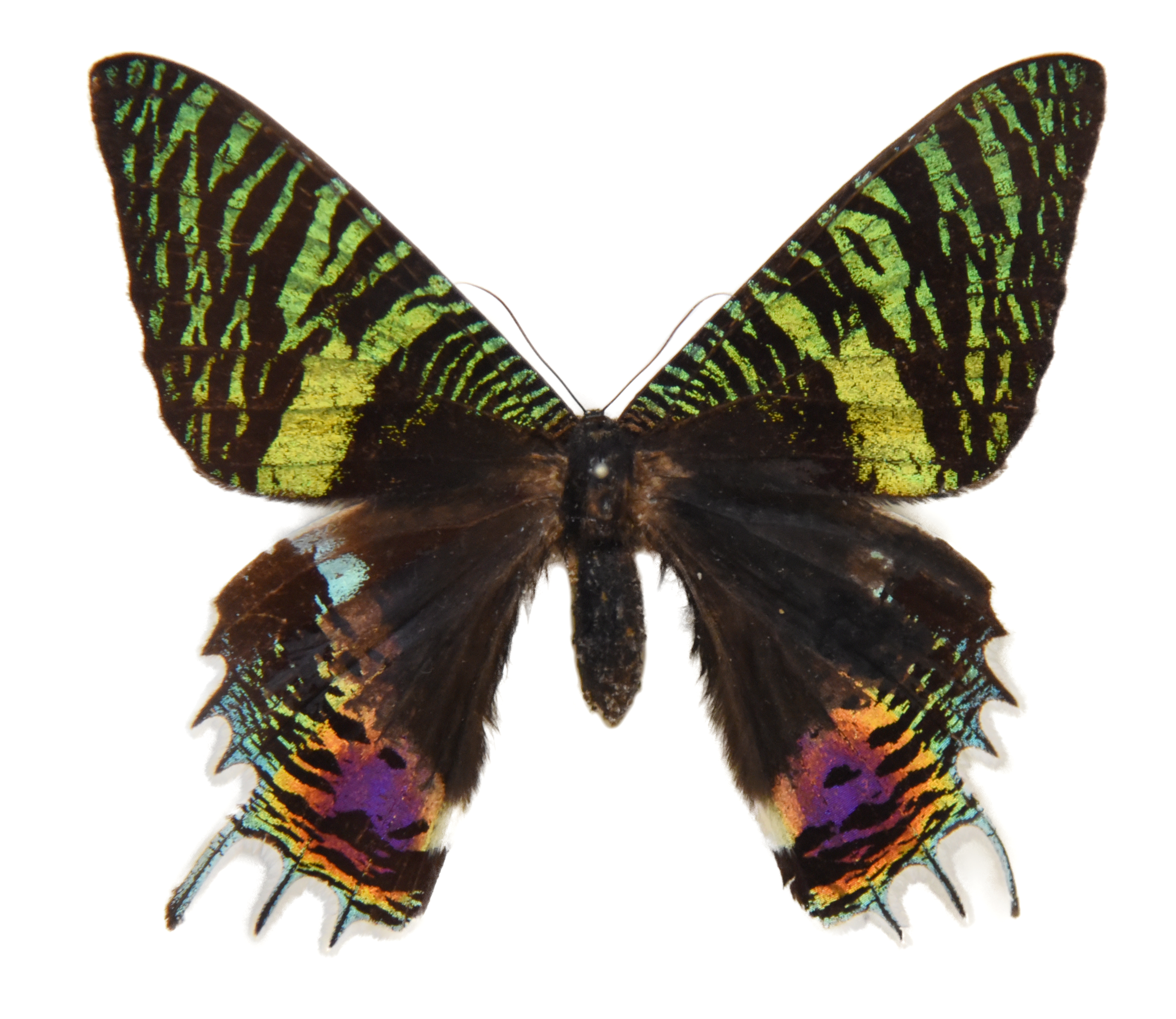

Scientific classification
- Kingdom: Animalia
- Phylum: Arthropoda
- Class: Insecta
- Order: Lepidoptera
- Family: Uraniidae
- Genus: Chrysiridia
- Species: C. croesus

Binomial name
- Chrysiridia croesus (Gerstaecker, 1871)

Synonyms
- Thaliura croesus Gerst., 1871; Urania croesus; Chrysiridia nigrescens (Pfeiffer, 1925); Urania nigrescens Pfeiffer, 1925

= Chrysiridia croesus =

East African sunset moth

Species of moth

Chrysiridia croesus, the East African sunset moth, is a moth of the family Uraniidae. As suggested by its common name, it is found in East Africa, including Kenya, Tanzania, Mozambique and Zimbabwe. The species was first described by Carl Eduard Adolph Gerstaecker in 1871.
