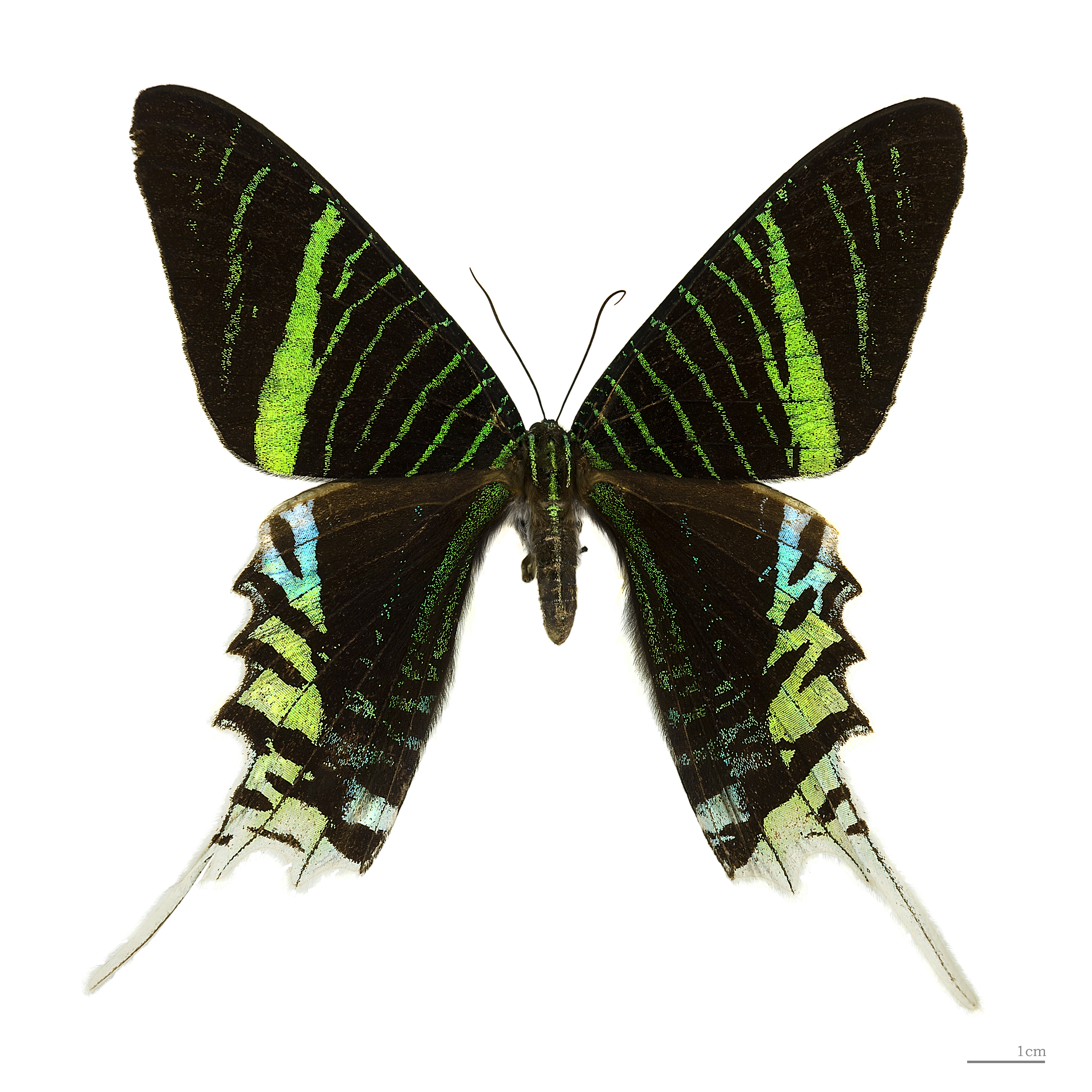
- Urania leilus

Scientific classification
- Kingdom: Animalia
- Phylum: Arthropoda
- Clade: Pancrustacea
- Class: Insecta
- Order: Lepidoptera
- Superfamily: Geometroidea
- Family: Uraniidae; Blanchard, 1845

Subfamilies
- Auzeinae; Uraniinae; Microniinae; Epipleminae

Synonyms
- Epiplemidae Hampson, 1892

= Uraniidae =

Family of moths

The Uraniidae (also called Swallowtail moths) are a family of moths containing four subfamilies, 90 genera, and roughly 700 species. The family is distributed throughout the tropics of the Americas, Africa and Indo-Australia. Some of the tropical species are known for their bright, butterfly-like colors and are called sunset moths (for example Chrysiridia rhipheus). Such moths are apparently toxic and the bright colors are a warning to predators.

The family Uraniidae contains both diurnal and nocturnal species. The day-flying species are usually more strikingly colored and vibrant than the nocturnal ones. Many diurnal species also have iridescent scales and multiple tails, which often led them to be mistaken for butterflies. In sharp contrast, the nocturnal species are generally small, pale-colored insects. The Uraniidae are similar to the geometer moths, to which they are related, but a different wing veining pattern distinguishes them.
