= List of moths of India (Uraniidae) =

This is a list of moths of the family Uraniidae that are found in India. It also acts as an index to the species articles and forms part of the full List of moths of India. This list is incomplete.

== Subfamily Auzeinae ==
- Decetia numicusaria (Walker, 1860)
- Decetia subobscurata Walker, 1862

== Subfamily Epipleminae ==
- Chundana emarginata (Hampson, 1891)
- Dysaethria erasaria (Christoph, 1881)
- Dysaethria flavistriga (Warren, 1901)
- Dysaethria grisea (Warren, 1896)
- Dysaethria lilacina (Moore, [1887])
- Dysaethra quadricaudata (Walker, 1861)
- Epiplema fulvilinea Hampson, 1895
- Epiplema fuscifrons (Warren, 1896)
- Epiplema himala (Butler, 1880)
- Epiplema rhacina Swinhoe, 1917
- Europlema conchiferata (Moore, 1887)
- Europlema desistaria (Walker, 1861)
- Europlema irrorata (Moore, 1887)
- Europlema semibrunnea (Pagenstecher, 1884)
- Eversmannia exornata (Eversmann, 1837)
- Monobolodes prunaria (Moore, [1887])
- Oroplema oyamana (Matsumura, 1931)
- Oroplema plagifera (Butler, 1881)
- Oroplema simplex (Warren, 1899)
- Orudiza protheclaria Walker, 1861
- Phazaca erosioides Walker, 1863
- Phazaca leucocera (Hampson, 1891)
- Phazaca theclata (Guenée, 1857)
- Phazaca unicauda (Dudgeon, 1905)
- Pseudhyria rubra (Hampson, 1891)
- Rhombophylla edentata (Hampson, 1895)
- Rhombophylla rectimarginata (Hampson, 1902)

== Subfamily Microniinae ==
- Acropteris ciniferaria (Walker, 1866)
- Micronia aculeata Guenée, 1857
- Pseudomicronia advocataria (Walker, 1861)
- Pseudomicronia fraterna Moore
- Strophidia caudata (Fabricius, 1781)

== Subfamily Uraniinae ==
- Urapteroides astheniata (Guenée, 1857)

== See also ==
- Uraniidae
- List of moths of India
