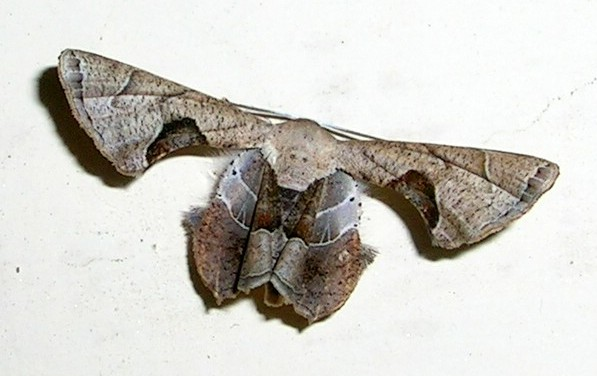
- Phazaca leucocera

Scientific classification
- Kingdom: Animalia
- Phylum: Arthropoda
- Clade: Pancrustacea
- Class: Insecta
- Order: Lepidoptera
- Family: Uraniidae
- Subfamily: Epipleminae; Hampson, 1892

Genera
- Dozens, see text

= Epipleminae =

Subfamily of moths

The Epipleminae or epiplemiine moths are a subfamily of the lepidopteran family Uraniidae. The subfamily was first described by George Hampson in 1892. They are the most diverse and widespread uraniid group, occurring mainly throughout the Pantropics but barely reaching into the temperate regions. The Epipleminae are notable for the sexually dimorphic tympanal organ which is unlike any other lepidopteran's in details of its morphology. Some species are also peculiar in being able to roll their wings into a stick-like shape, possibly as a form of crypsis. Such behavior has hitherto only been found in this subfamily and the quite unrelated Ennominae (Sohn & Yen 2005).

Unlike the often colorful Uraniinae, they are smallish and drab species, and have earlier been erroneously placed with the Geometridae or Drepanidae based on phenetic considerations. Only three species have come to note as minor pests of commercial plants:

- Leucoplema dohertyi
- Epiplema fulvilinea – does not belong into this genus
- Dysaethria moza – formerly Epiplema

== Genera ==
This list of genera is preliminary. A complete review of the subfamily seems hardly possible as a monographical work given its diversity, so it will probably be reviewed piecemeal (e.g. Sohn & Yen 2005). Several genera are known (Epiplema) or suspected (Monobolodes, Phazaca) not to be monophyletic, or may be altogether invalid (Sohn & Yen 2005).

- Acropterygia
- Alaplena
- Anorthodisca
- Antiplecta
- Aoratosema
- Aorista
- Aphyodes
- Arussiana
- Asyngria
- Bicavernosa
- Calledapteryx
- Callizzia
- Capnophylla
- Cathetus
- Ceronaba
- Chaetoceras
- Chaetopyga
- Chionoplema
- Chrysocestis
- Chundana
- Cirrhura
- Coelura
- Coeluromima
- Coelurotricha
- Crypsicoela
- Dasmeuda
- Decetiodes
- Dicroplema
- Dysaethria
- Dysrhombia
- Epiplema (polyphyletic)
- Erosia
- Europlema
- Eversmannia
- Falcinodes
- Gathynia
- Gymnoplocia
- Heteroplema
- Hyperplema
- Hypophysaria
- Hypoplema
- Leuconotha
- Leucoplema
- Lophopygia
- Lophotosoma
- Macrostylodes
- Madepiplema
- Meleaba
- Menda
- Mesoglypta
- Metorthocheilus
- Microniodes
- Molybdophora
- Monobolodes – includes Cathetus. Monophyly requires confirmation.
- Monoplema
- Morphomima
- Nedusia
- Neodeta
- Neodirades
- Neoplema
- Notoptya
- Nyctibadistes
- Oroplema
- Orudiza
- Paloda
- Paradecetia
- Paradirades
- Paroecia
- Paurophlebs
- Phazaca - includes Balantiucha, Dirades, Diradopsis, Homoplexis, Lobogethes. Monophyly requires confirmation.
- Philagraula
- Platerosia
- Powondrella
- Psamathia
- Pseudhyria
- Pseudodirades
- Pterotosoma
- Rhombophylla
- Saccoploca
- Schidax
- Siculodopsis
- Skaphion
- Symphytophleps
- Syngria
- Syngriodes
- Thysanocraspeda
- Tricolpia
- Trotorhombia
- Warreniplema
