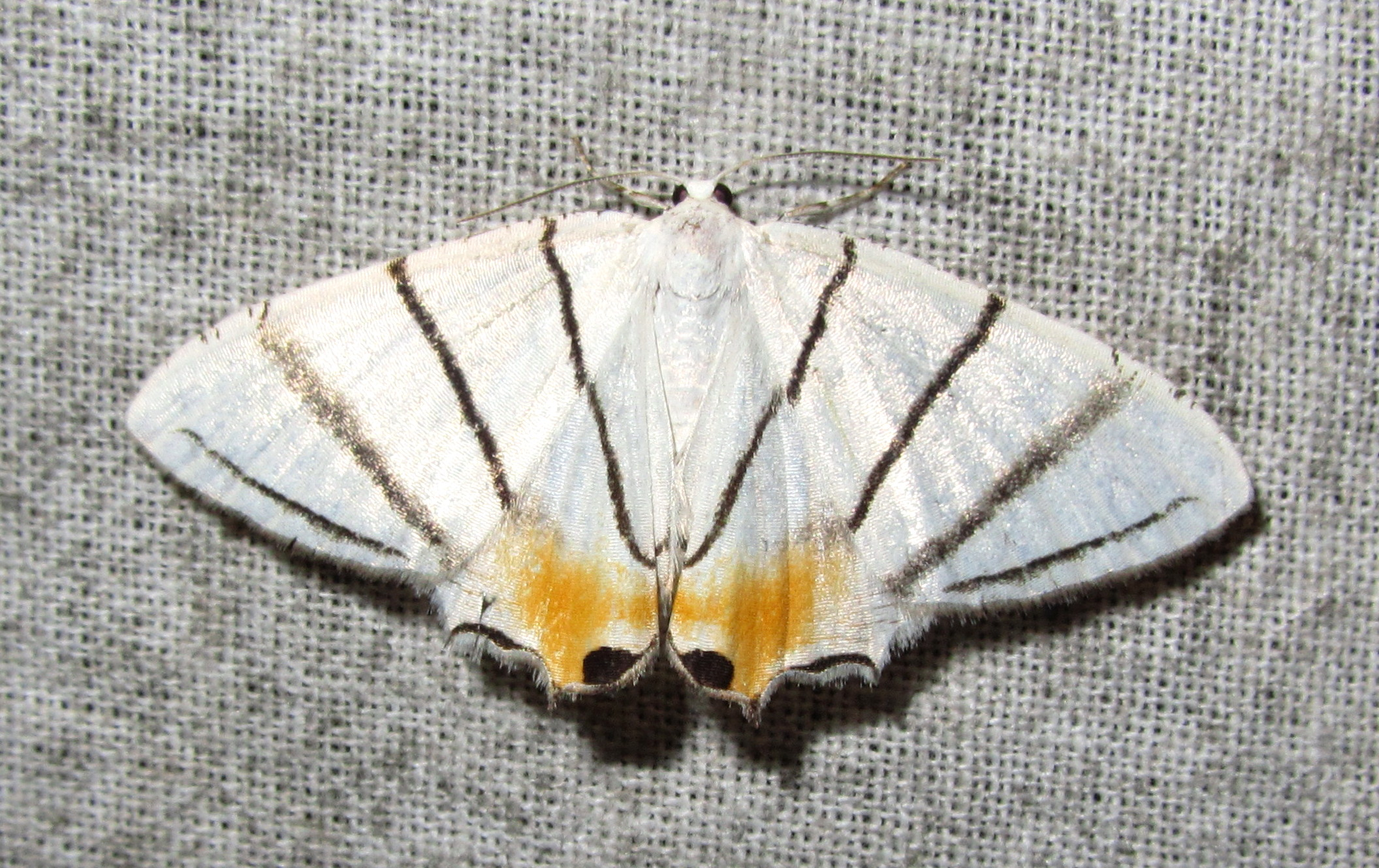
- Epiplema himala

Scientific classification
- Kingdom: Animalia
- Phylum: Arthropoda
- Clade: Pancrustacea
- Class: Insecta
- Order: Lepidoptera
- Family: Uraniidae
- Subfamily: Epipleminae
- Genus: Epiplema; Herrich-Schäffer, [1855]

Synonyms
- Paloda Walker, 1861; Eversmannia Staudinger, 1871; Chaetopyga Warren, 1896

= Epiplema =

Genus of moths

Epiplema is a genus of moths in the family Uraniidae described by Gottlieb August Wilhelm Herrich-Schäffer in 1855. A number of species have been reassigned to Europlema.

== Description ==
Palpi porrect (extending forward), projecting beyond the frons. Forewings with vein 5 from the upper angle of cell and veins 6, 7 and 8, 9 stalked. Vein 10 usually from cell, rarely stalked with 8 and 9. Hindwings with veins 3 and 4 from angle of cell. Vein 5 from middle of discocellulars and veins 6 and 7 from upper angle. Wings held more or less apart in repose.

== Species ==
- Epiplema acutangularia Herrich-Schäffer, [1855]
- Epiplema albida
- Epiplema angulata Warren, 1896
- Epiplema argillodes Turner, 1903
- Epiplema certaria (Walker, 1861)
- Epiplema clathrata Warren, 1896
- Epiplema coeruleotincta Warren, 1896
- Epiplema exornata (Eversmann, 1837)
- Epiplema himala (Butler, 1880)
- Epiplema horrida (Warren, 1896)
- Epiplema incolorata (Guenée, 1857)
- Epiplema irrorata (Moore, 1887)
- Epiplema latifasciata (Moore, 1887)
- Epiplema leucosema Turner, 1911
- Epiplema quadristrigata (Walker, 1866)
- Epiplema saccata (Holloway, 1998)
- Epiplema stereogramma (Turner, 1903)
- Epiplema tenebrosa Hampson
- Epiplema thiocosma Turner, 1911
