= Epiplema tenebrosa =

Scientific classification
- Kingdom: Animalia
- Phylum: Arthropoda
- Class: Insecta
- Order: Lepidoptera
- Family: Uraniidae
- Genus: Epiplema
- Species: E. tenebrosa

Binomial name
- Epiplema tenebrosa Hampson

Species of moth

Epiplema tenebrosa is a moth of the family Uraniidae.
