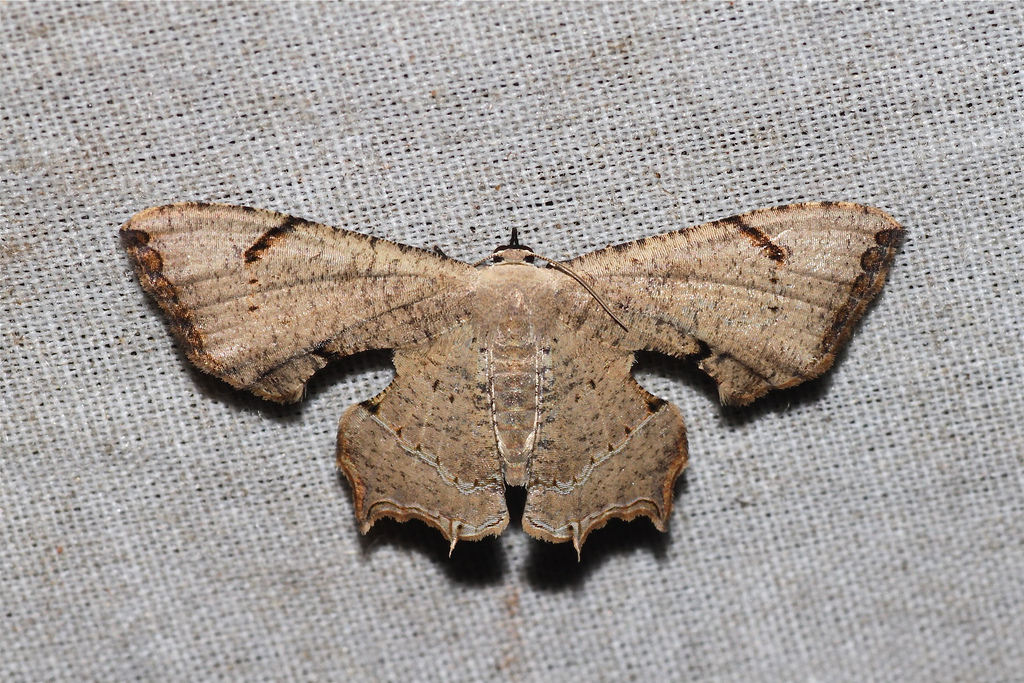
- Dysaethria quadricaudata

Scientific classification
- Kingdom: Animalia
- Phylum: Arthropoda
- Class: Insecta
- Order: Lepidoptera
- Family: Uraniidae
- Subfamily: Epipleminae
- Genus: Dysaethria; Turner, 1911

Type species
- Dysaethria pasteopa Turner, 1911

= Dysaethria =

Genus of moths

Dysaethria is a genus of moths in the family Uraniidae. It was described by Turner in 1911. The species of this genus occur mainly in Asia and in Australia.

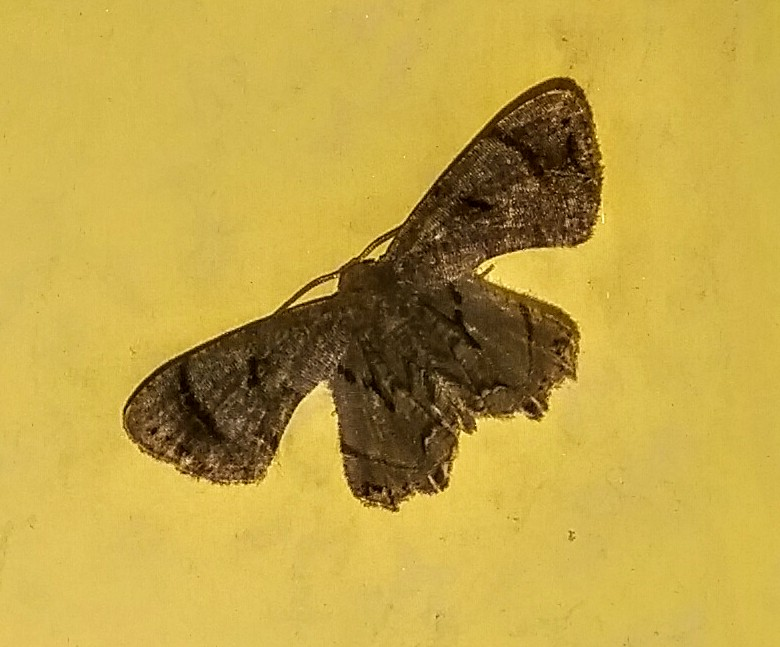
in Sri Lanka

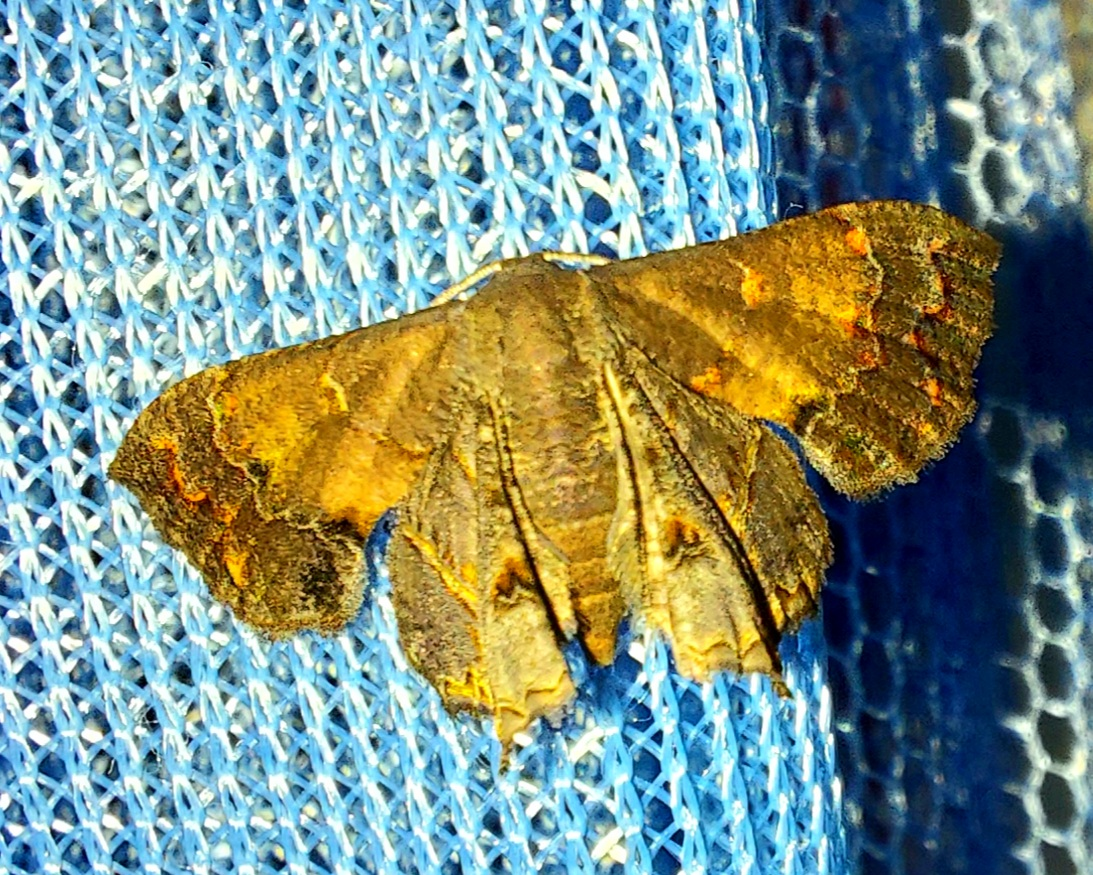
in Sri Lanka

== Species ==
- Dysaethria albidaria (Walker)
- Dysaethria albolilacina (Holloway, 1998)
- Dysaethria bellissima (Warren)
- Dysaethria caerulimargo (Holloway, 1976)
- Dysaethria candidaria (Walker)
- Dysaethria columba (Holloway, 1976)
- Dysaethria conflictaria (Walker, 1861)
- Dysaethria cretacea (Butler, 1881)
- Dysaethria danum Holloway, 1998
- Dysaethria diffiniaria (Walker, 1861)
- Dysaethria erasaria (Christoph, 1881)
- Dysaethria exprimataria (Walker, 1861)
- Dysaethria flavida (Warren, 1909)
- Dysaethria flavistriga (Warren, 1901)
- Dysaethria formosibia (Strand 1916)
- Dysaethria fulvihamata (Hampson, 1912)
- Dysaethria grisea (Warren, 1896)
- Dysaethria harmani Holloway, 1998
- Dysaethria illotata (Christoph, 1880)
- Dysaethria indignaria (Walker, 1866)
- Dysaethria kosemponicola (Strand, 1917)
- Dysaethria lilacina (Moore, 1887)
- Dysaethria lunulimargo
- Dysaethria meridiana (Inoue, 1982)
- Dysaethria moza (Butler, 1878)
- Dysaethria nigrifrons (Hampson, 1896)
- Dysaethria obscuraria (Moore, 1887)
- Dysaethria oriocharis (West, 1932)
- Dysaethria particolor (Warren, 1896)
- Dysaethria pasteopa Turner, 1911
- Dysaethria plicata (Snellen, 1877)
- Dysaethria punctata (Holloway, 1976)
- Dysaethria quadricaudata (Walker, 1861)
- Dysaethria rhagavata (Walker, 1861)
- Dysaethria rhagavolita Holloway, 1998
- Dysaethria rubrililacina (Holloway, 1998)
- Dysaethria scopocera (Hampson, 1896)
- Dysaethria signifera (Warren)
- Dysaethria subalbata (Guenée, 1857)
- Dysaethria suisharyonis (Strand)
- Dysaethria secutaria (Walker, 1866)
- Dysaethria spatulata (Holloway, 1979)
- Dysaethria strigulicosta (Strand, 1917)
- Dysaethria subflavida (Swinhoe, 1906)
- Dysaethria walkeri Holloway, 1998
- Dysaethria wilemani (West)
- Dysaethria warreni (Rothschild)
- Dysaethria wollastoni (Rothschild)
