= Dysaethria rhagavata =

Scientific classification
- Kingdom: Animalia
- Phylum: Arthropoda
- Clade: Pancrustacea
- Class: Insecta
- Order: Lepidoptera
- Family: Uraniidae
- Genus: Dysaethria
- Species: D. rhagavata

Binomial name
- Dysaethria rhagavata (Walker, 1861)

Synonyms
- Dirades rhagavata Walker, 1861; Erosia rhagavata Walker, 1861

Species of moth

Dysaethria rhagavata is a moth of the family Uraniidae first described by Francis Walker in 1861. It is found in Sri Lanka.
