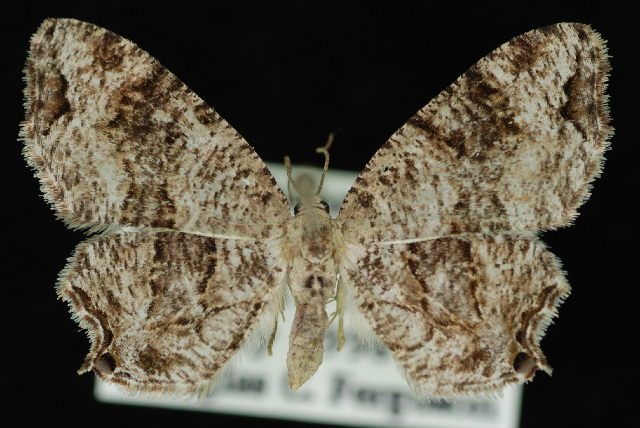

Scientific classification
- Domain: Eukaryota
- Kingdom: Animalia
- Phylum: Arthropoda
- Class: Insecta
- Order: Lepidoptera
- Family: Uraniidae
- Genus: Callizzia
- Species: C. certiorara

Binomial name
- Callizzia certiorara Pearsall, 1906

= Callizzia certiorara =

Species of moth

Callizzia certiorara is a species of scoopwing moth in the family Uraniidae. It is found in North America.

The MONA or Hodges number for Callizzia certiorara is 7651.
