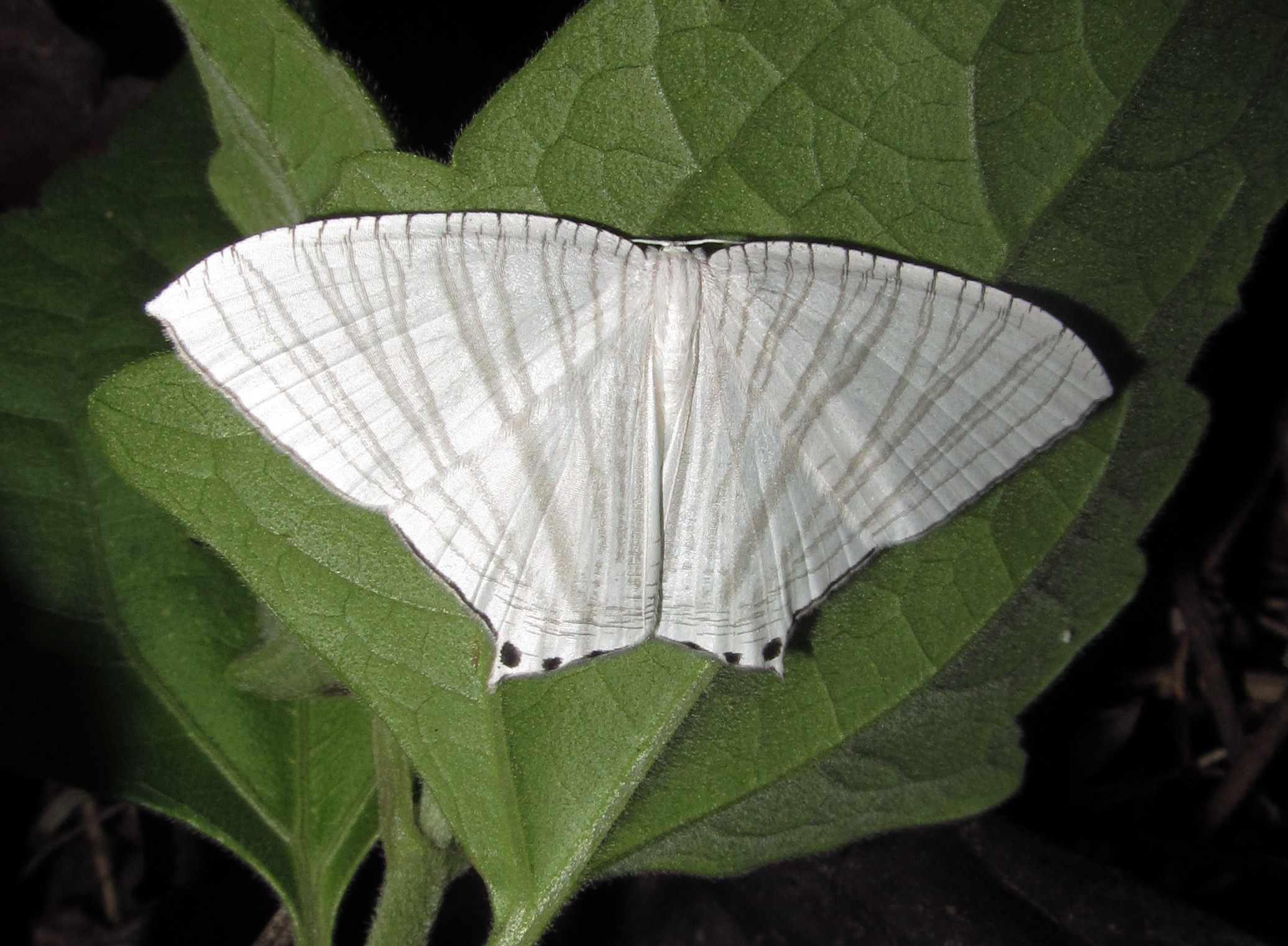
- Pseudomicronia sp.

Scientific classification
- Kingdom: Animalia
- Phylum: Arthropoda
- Class: Insecta
- Order: Lepidoptera
- Family: Uraniidae
- Subfamily: Microniinae
- Genus: Pseudomicronia; Moore, 1887

= Pseudomicronia =

Genus of moths

Pseudomicronia is a genus of moths in the family Uraniidae.

== Description ==
Palpi short, porrect and not very slender. Antennae thickened and flattened. Mid tibia with one pair of spurs, hind tibia with two pairs. Forewing with costa slightly arched. The apex rounded, the outer margin straight. Veins 2 and 3 from a point before end of cell. Veins 6 and 7 stalked. Veins 8 to 10 stalked. Hindwing with an angled tail at vein 4 and veins 3,4 from cell.

== Species ==
Some species of this genus are:

- Pseudomicronia advocataria (Walker, 1861) (India, Taiwan, China, Philippines, Borneo)
- Pseudomicronia archilis (Oberthür, 1891)
- Pseudomicronia bundutuhan Holloway, 1998 (Borneo)
- Pseudomicronia charassozona West, 1932
- Pseudomicronia fraterna Moore, 1887 (Sri Lanka)
- Pseudomicronia oppositana Snellen
- Pseudomicronia unimacula Warren
- Pseudomicronia tibetana Bytinski-Salz, 1939 (Tibet)
