= Dysaethria conflictaria =

Scientific classification
- Kingdom: Animalia
- Phylum: Arthropoda
- Class: Insecta
- Order: Lepidoptera
- Family: Uraniidae
- Genus: Dysaethria
- Species: D. conflictaria

Binomial name
- Dysaethria conflictaria (Walker, 1861)

Synonyms
- Erosia conflictaria Walker, 1861; Dirades parvula Moore, 1887; Epiplema lacteata Warren, 1896; Epiplema perpolita Warren, 1896

Species of moth

Dysaethria conflictaria, or Epiplema conflictaria, is a moth of the family Uraniidae first described by Francis Walker in 1861. It is found in Indo-Australian tropics of India, Sri Lanka, Thailand, Papua New Guinea, the Solomon Islands and Australia.

Its wingspan is 2 cm. The wings are plain dark grey with zigzag brown lines across each wing. Hindwing margin has two tails.

Host plants include Cananga odorata and Artabotrys siamensis.
