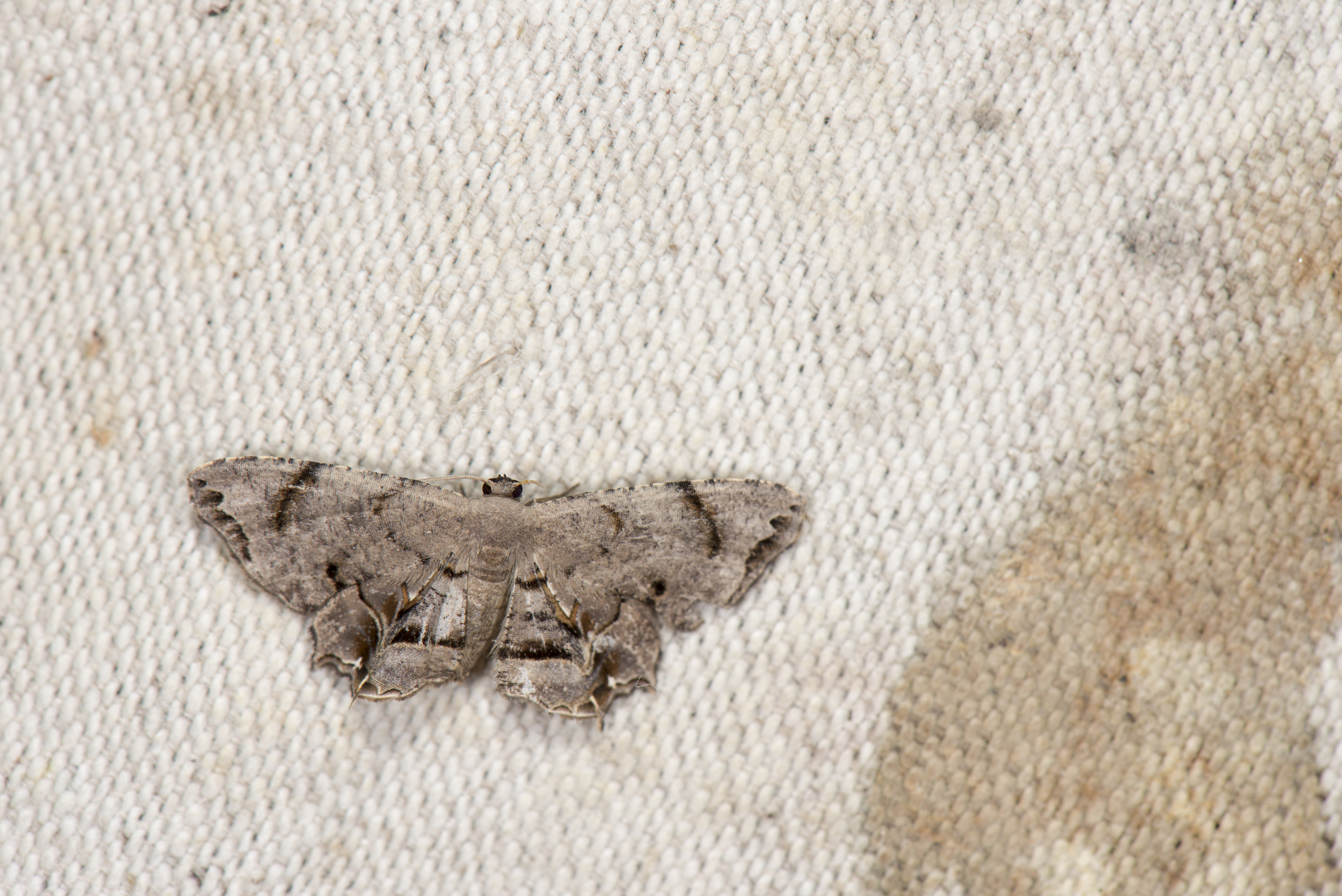

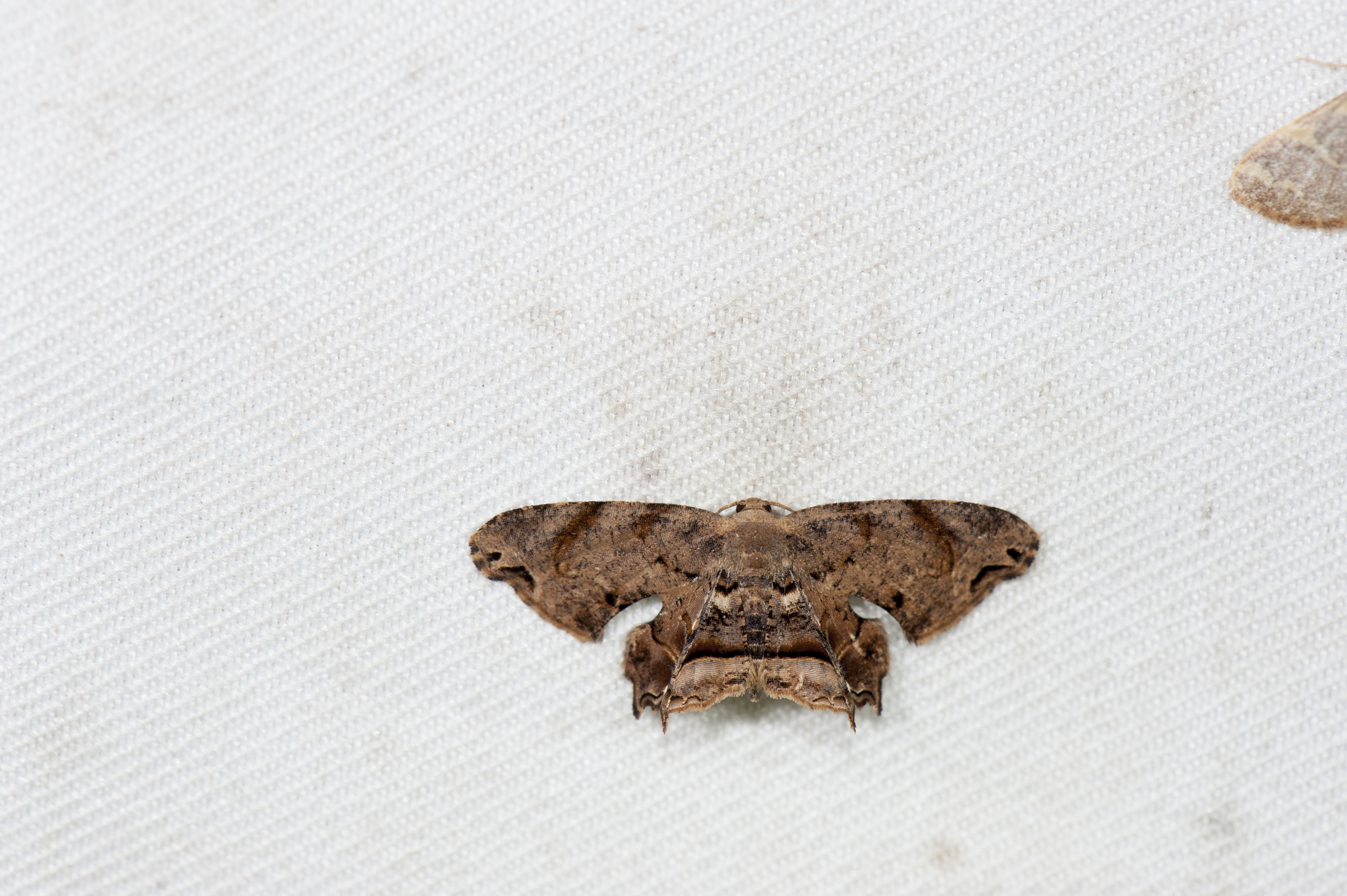

Scientific classification
- Kingdom: Animalia
- Phylum: Arthropoda
- Clade: Pancrustacea
- Class: Insecta
- Order: Lepidoptera
- Family: Uraniidae
- Genus: Dysaethria
- Species: D. fulvihamata

Binomial name
- Dysaethria fulvihamata (Hampson, 1912)

Synonyms
- Epiplema fulvihamata Hampson, 1912

= Dysaethria fulvihamata =

Species of moth

Dysaethria fulvihamata is a moth of the family Uraniidae first described by George Hampson in . It is found in Sri Lanka, Taiwan, Hong Kong, the Ryukyu Islands and Borneo.

== Gallery ==
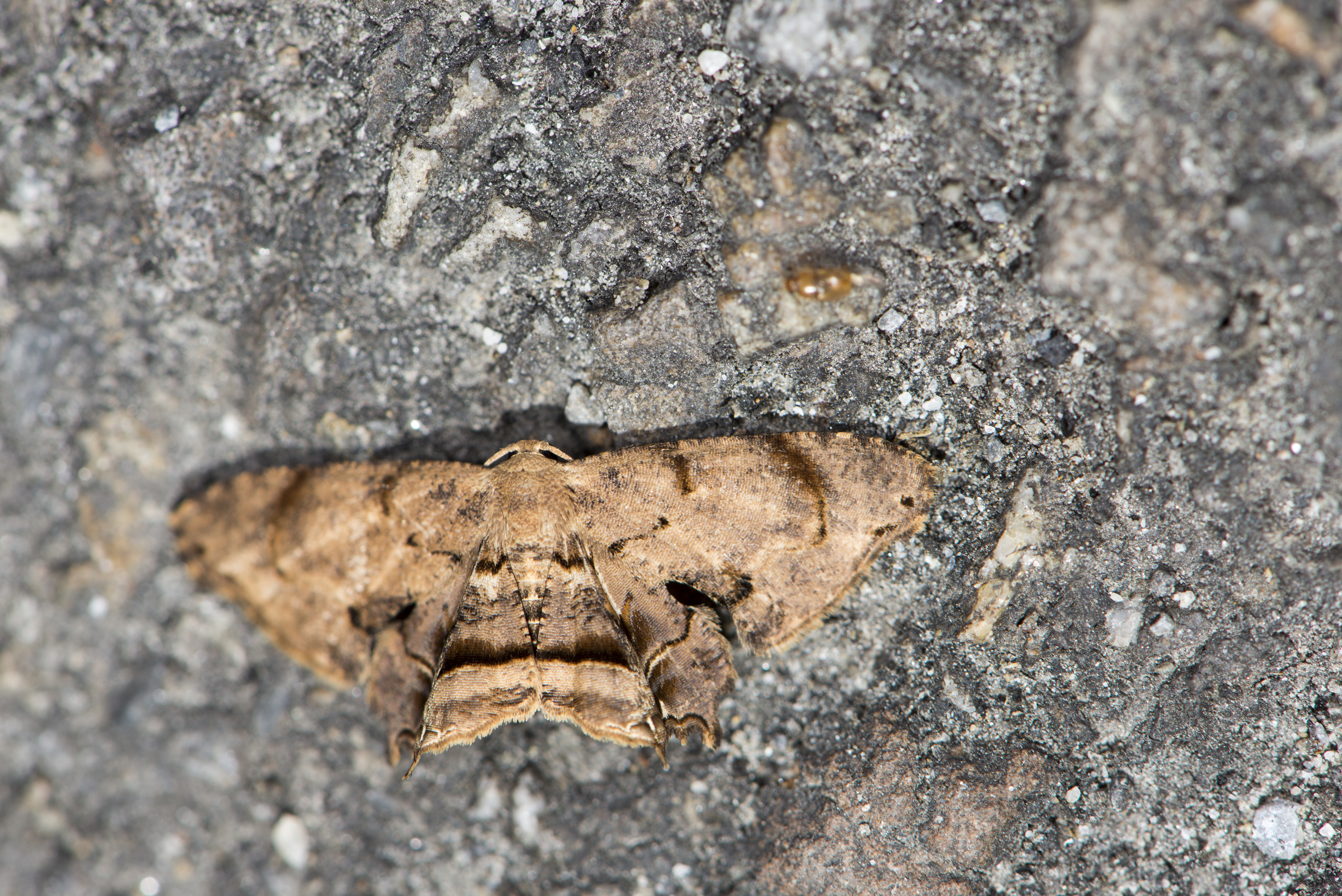
Live specimen

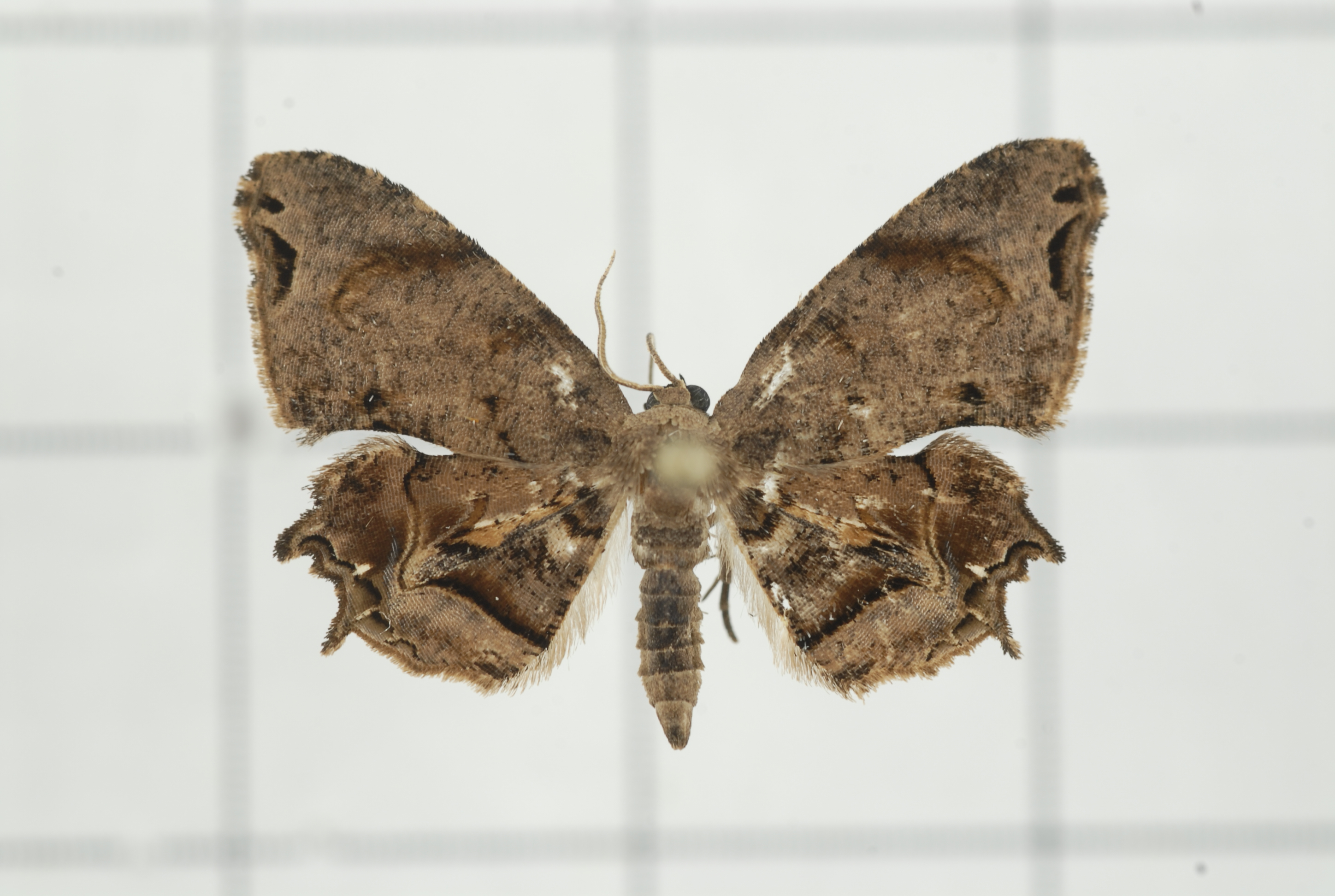
Dorsal surface
