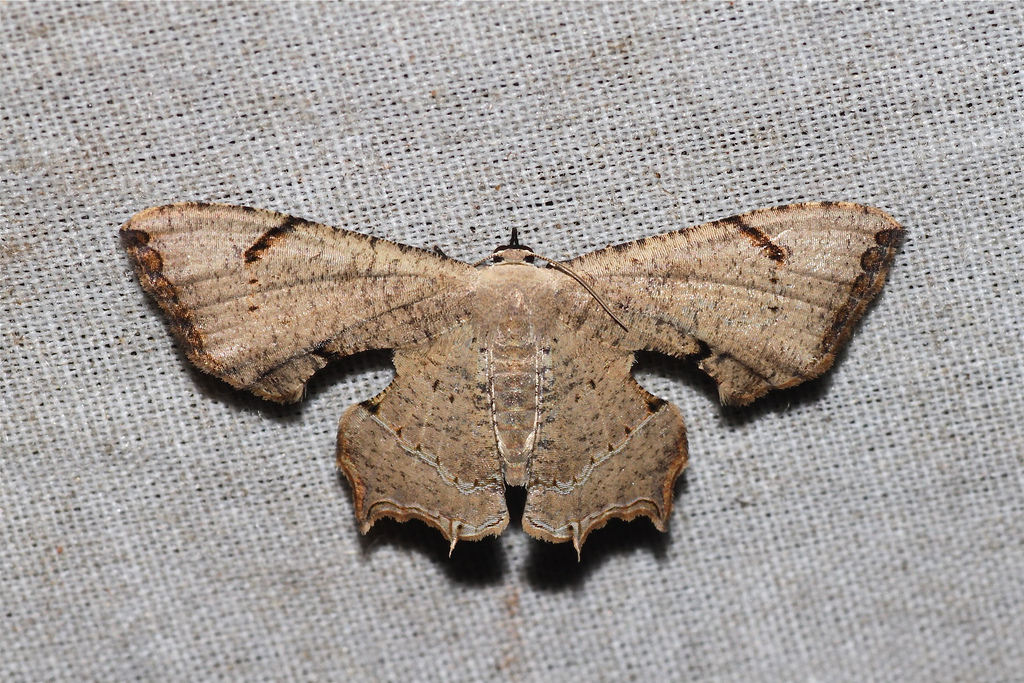

Scientific classification
- Kingdom: Animalia
- Phylum: Arthropoda
- Class: Insecta
- Order: Lepidoptera
- Family: Uraniidae
- Genus: Dysaethria
- Species: D. quadricaudata

Binomial name
- Dysaethria quadricaudata (Walker, 1861)

Synonyms
- Erosia quadricaudata Walker, 1861; Epiplema quadricaudata; Erosia varisaria Walker, 1861; Epiplema subproximans Warren, 1896

= Dysaethria quadricaudata =

Species of moth

Dysaethria quadricaudata is a species of moth of the family Uraniidae first described by Francis Walker in 1896. It is found in the Indo-Australian tropics from India, Sri Lanka to Myanmar, Taiwan and the Solomon Islands. The habitat consists of lowland forests and disturbed and cultivated areas.

== Description ==
The wingspan of the male is 24 mm and the female is 32 mm. Adults are uniform pale brown with vinous (wine coloured) frons, and slightly speckled brownish grey. The forewing postmedial line is blackened at the costa and at the dorsum. There is a narrow dark marginal zone to the forewing. Forewings with evenly curved outer margin. A chocolate marginal band runs from apex of vein 3. Hindwings with slight tails at veins 4 and 7. Postmedial line evenly waved and a lunulate submarginal band found between the tails. Ventral side of hindwings whitish.

Larvae dark reddish chocolate and sub-cylindrical. Head heart shaped. Setae black with white spots in front of the dorsolateral tubercles. Ventral surface green with red tinged laterals. Pupa is stoutly claviform (club shaped).

The larvae feed on Adina, Breonia (syn. Anthocephalus) and Cinchona species.
