= Antiplecta triangularis =

Scientific classification
- Domain: Eukaryota
- Kingdom: Animalia
- Phylum: Arthropoda
- Class: Insecta
- Order: Lepidoptera
- Family: Uraniidae
- Genus: Antiplecta
- Species: A. triangularis

Binomial name
- Antiplecta triangularis Warren, 1906

Species of moth

Antiplecta triangularis is a species of scoopwing moth in the family Uraniidae. It is found in the Caribbean Sea, Central America, and North America.

The MONA or Hodges number for Antiplecta triangularis is 7652.
