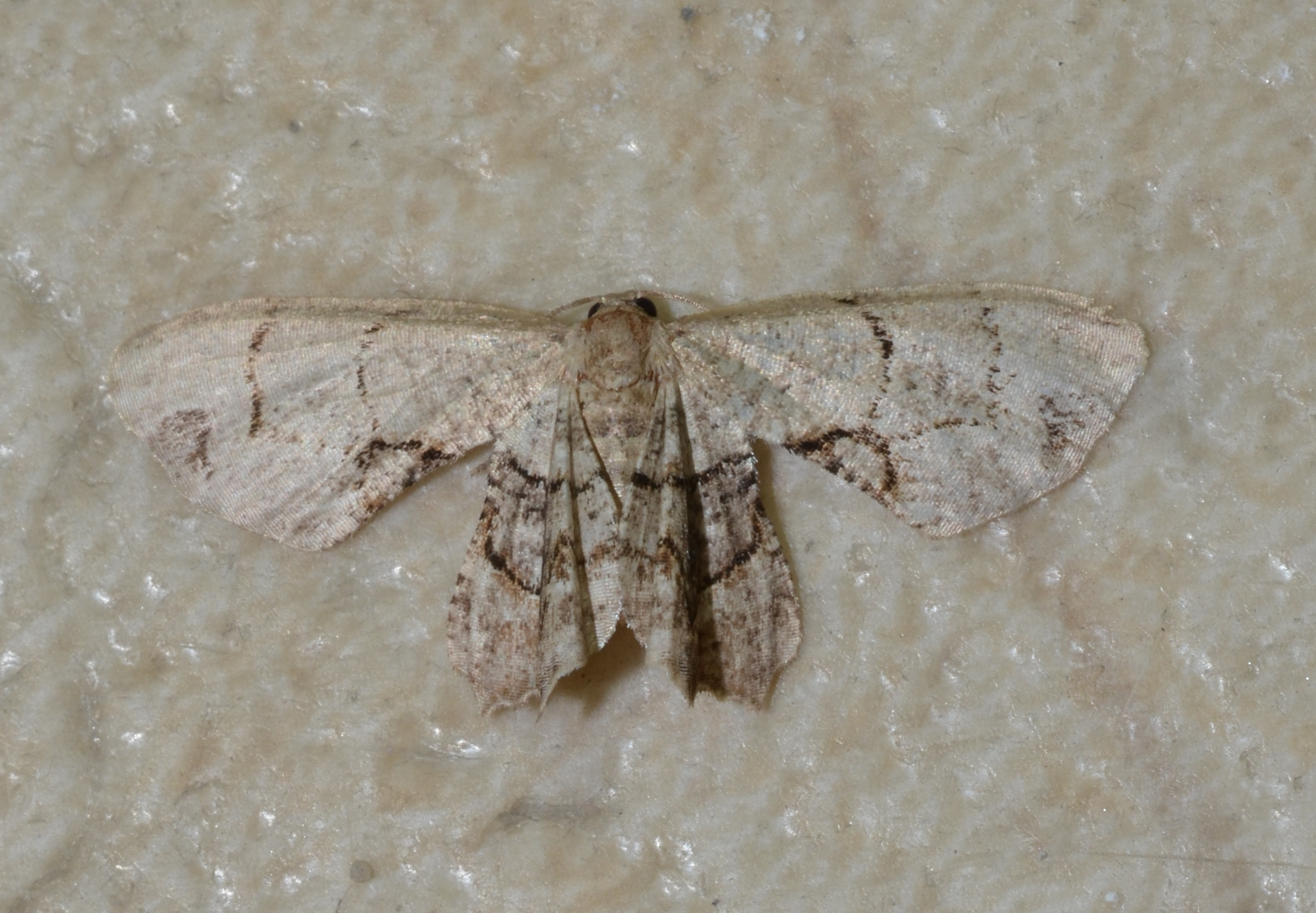

Scientific classification
- Kingdom: Animalia
- Phylum: Arthropoda
- Clade: Pancrustacea
- Class: Insecta
- Order: Lepidoptera
- Family: Uraniidae
- Genus: Callizzia
- Species: C. amorata

Binomial name
- Callizzia amorata Packard, 1876

= Callizzia amorata =

Gray scoopwing moth

Species of moth

Callizzia amorata, the gray scoopwing moth, is a species of swallowtail moth of the family Uraniidae and is found in North America.

== Description ==
=== Adults ===
Adult forewings are typically held horizontally and spread, while the hindwings are creased and held along or over the abdomen. The forewings each have a black-edged, brown triangle near the outer margin.

== Range ==
The species' occurrence range extends from California and British Columbia in the west to Florida and Nova Scotia in the east.

== Life cycle ==
=== Adults ===
Adults have been reported from February to October, with most sightings from May to August.
