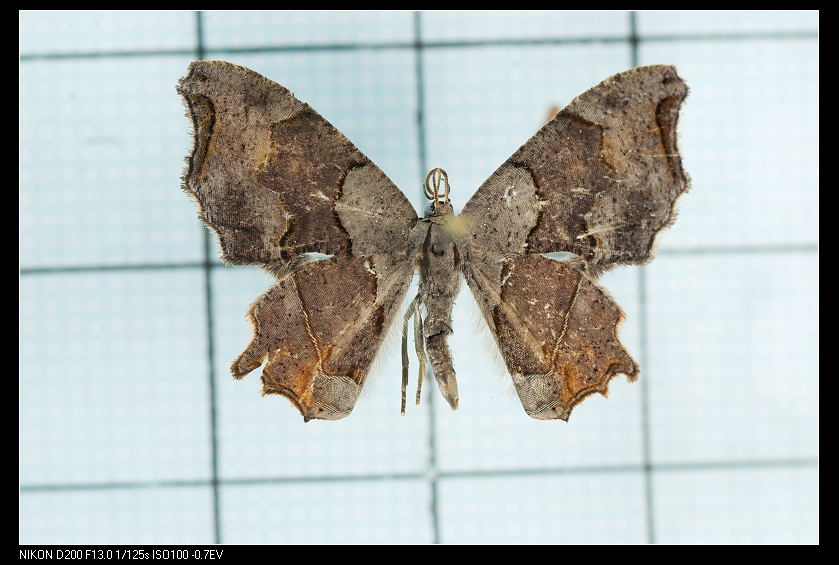

Scientific classification
- Domain: Eukaryota
- Kingdom: Animalia
- Phylum: Arthropoda
- Class: Insecta
- Order: Lepidoptera
- Family: Uraniidae
- Genus: Pterotosoma
- Species: P. castanea

Binomial name
- Pterotosoma castanea (Warren, 1898)

Synonyms
- Epiplema castanea Warren, 1898; Epiplema castanea kinabalua Holloway, 1976

= Pterotosoma castanea =

Species of insect

Pterotosoma castanea is a species of moth of the family Uraniidae. It is found in the north-eastern Himalaya, Taiwan and Borneo.

== Subspecies ==
- Pterotosoma castanea castanea (north-eastern Himalaya, Taiwan)
- Pterotosoma castanea kinabalua (Holloway, 1976) (Borneo)
