= Epiplema albida =

Scientific classification
- Kingdom: Animalia
- Phylum: Arthropoda
- Class: Insecta
- Order: Lepidoptera
- Family: Uraniidae
- Genus: Epiplema
- Species: E. albida

Binomial name
- Epiplema albida Hampson, 1895

Species of moth

Epiplema albida is a species of moth of the family Uraniidae. It was described by George Hampson in 1895. It is found in India, and Sri Lanka.

== Description ==
It has a wingspan of 24 mm. Forewings with outer margin evenly curved. Hindwings with slight tails at veins 4 and 7. Male has pale violaceous-greyish body with dark brown frons. Forewings slightly irrorated (sprinkled) with dark brown. There are indistinct red-brown antemedial and postmedial excurved lines, where the latter more or less indented and approaching the former below the cell. A submarginal series of red-brown specks below the apex. Hindwings more thickly irrorated with brown. Antemedial and postmedial lines more prominent and angled outwards at vein 4, where there are rufous patches inside them. A submarginal lunulate line is present. Female more prominently brown irrorated. Forewings with a complete marginal lunulate series present. Hindwings without the patches on the lines which is found in male.

Sri Lankan specimens possess darker striae. The antemedial and postmedial lines of both wings nearer together and filled in with fuscous. These variations suggest the subspecies from Sri Lanka as lanigera.

The larvae feed on Ligustrum robustum (Oleaceae). It has been tested for biological control programs of its host plant in Réunion but had not been released.
