= Antiplecta =

Scientific classification
- Domain: Eukaryota
- Kingdom: Animalia
- Phylum: Arthropoda
- Class: Insecta
- Order: Lepidoptera
- Family: Uraniidae
- Subfamily: Epipleminae
- Genus: Antiplecta; Warren, 1900

Genus of moths

Antiplecta is a genus of scoopwing moths in the family Uraniidae. There are about five described species in Antiplecta.

== Species ==
These five species belong to the genus Antiplecta:

- Antiplecta caesia Warren, 1906
- Antiplecta cinerascens Warren, 1906
- Antiplecta nigripleta Warren, 1906
- Antiplecta pusilla Warren, 1900
- Antiplecta triangularis Warren, 1906
