= Eversmannia (moth) =

Scientific classification
- Kingdom: Animalia
- Phylum: Arthropoda
- Class: Insecta
- Order: Lepidoptera
- Family: Uraniidae
- Genus: Eversmannia; Staudinger, 1871

Genus of moths

Eversmannia is a genus of moths, belonging to the family Uraniidae. It was first described by Staudinger in 1871.

== Species ==
- Eversmannia exornata (Eversmann, 1837)
- Eversmannia plagifera which is now Oroplema plagifera
