= Cathetus euthysticha =

Scientific classification
- Domain: Eukaryota
- Kingdom: Animalia
- Phylum: Arthropoda
- Class: Insecta
- Order: Lepidoptera
- Family: Uraniidae
- Subfamily: Epipleminae
- Genus: Cathetus; Fletcher, 1979
- Species: C. euthysticha

Binomial name
- Cathetus euthysticha Fletcher, 1979

Genus of moths

Cathetus is a monotypic genus of moths in the family Uraniidae. The only species is Cathetus euthysticha. It was described by Fletcher, in 1979. This genus occurs mainly in southeast Asia and in Australia.
