= Epiplema irrorata =

Scientific classification
- Domain: Eukaryota
- Kingdom: Animalia
- Phylum: Arthropoda
- Class: Insecta
- Order: Lepidoptera
- Family: Uraniidae
- Genus: Epiplema
- Species: E. irrorata

Binomial name
- Epiplema irrorata (Moore, 1887)

Synonyms
- Dirades irrorata Moore, 1887

Species of moth

Epiplema irrorata is a moth of the family Uraniidae first described by Frederic Moore in 1887. It is found in India and Sri Lanka.
