= Epiplema quadristrigata =

Scientific classification
- Kingdom: Animalia
- Phylum: Arthropoda
- Class: Insecta
- Order: Lepidoptera
- Family: Uraniidae
- Genus: Epiplema
- Species: E. quadristrigata

Binomial name
- Epiplema quadristrigata (Walker, 1866)

Synonyms
- Erosia quadristrigata Walker, 1866; Epiplema pulverea Hampson, 1893; Epiplema oxytypa Turner, 1903

Species of moth

Epiplema quadristrigata is a moth of the family Uraniidae first described by Francis Walker in 1866. It is found in Australia and Sri Lanka.

Its wingspan is about 2 cm. The wings are off white with brown bands and lines. Hindwing margins each with two tails.
