= Dysaethria scopocera =

Scientific classification
- Kingdom: Animalia
- Phylum: Arthropoda
- Clade: Pancrustacea
- Class: Insecta
- Order: Lepidoptera
- Family: Uraniidae
- Genus: Dysaethria
- Species: D. scopocera

Binomial name
- Dysaethria scopocera (Hampson, 1896)

Synonyms
- Epiplema scopocera Hampson, 1896; Dirades formosibia Strand, 1917

Species of moth

Dysaethria scopocera is a moth of the family Uraniidae first described by George Hampson in 1896. It is found in Sri Lanka, Taiwan, Malaysia and Borneo.

The wingspan of the female is 9 mm. Wings are variegated black where broadly dull and medially red. Forewings with an irregular, angled, darker submarginal line. Postmedial strong and irregularly arched with concave base. Tails of hindwings rudimentary, though an angular pattern can be seen.

Two subspecies are recognized.

- Dysaethria scopocera formosibia (Strand, 1917) - Taiwan
- Dysaethria scopocera longiductus Holloway, 1998 - Borneo
