= Oroplema =

Scientific classification
- Kingdom: Animalia
- Phylum: Arthropoda
- Clade: Pancrustacea
- Class: Insecta
- Order: Lepidoptera
- Family: Uraniidae
- Subfamily: Epipleminae
- Genus: Oroplema; Holloway, 1998

Genus of moths

Oroplema is a genus of moths in the family Uraniidae. The genus was erected by Jeremy Daniel Holloway in 1998.

== Species ==
- Oroplema dealbata (Warren, 1906)
- Oroplema oyamana (Matsumura, 1931)
- Oroplema simplex (Warren, 1899)
- Oroplema parvipallida Holloway, 1998
- Oroplema plagifera (Butler, 1881)
