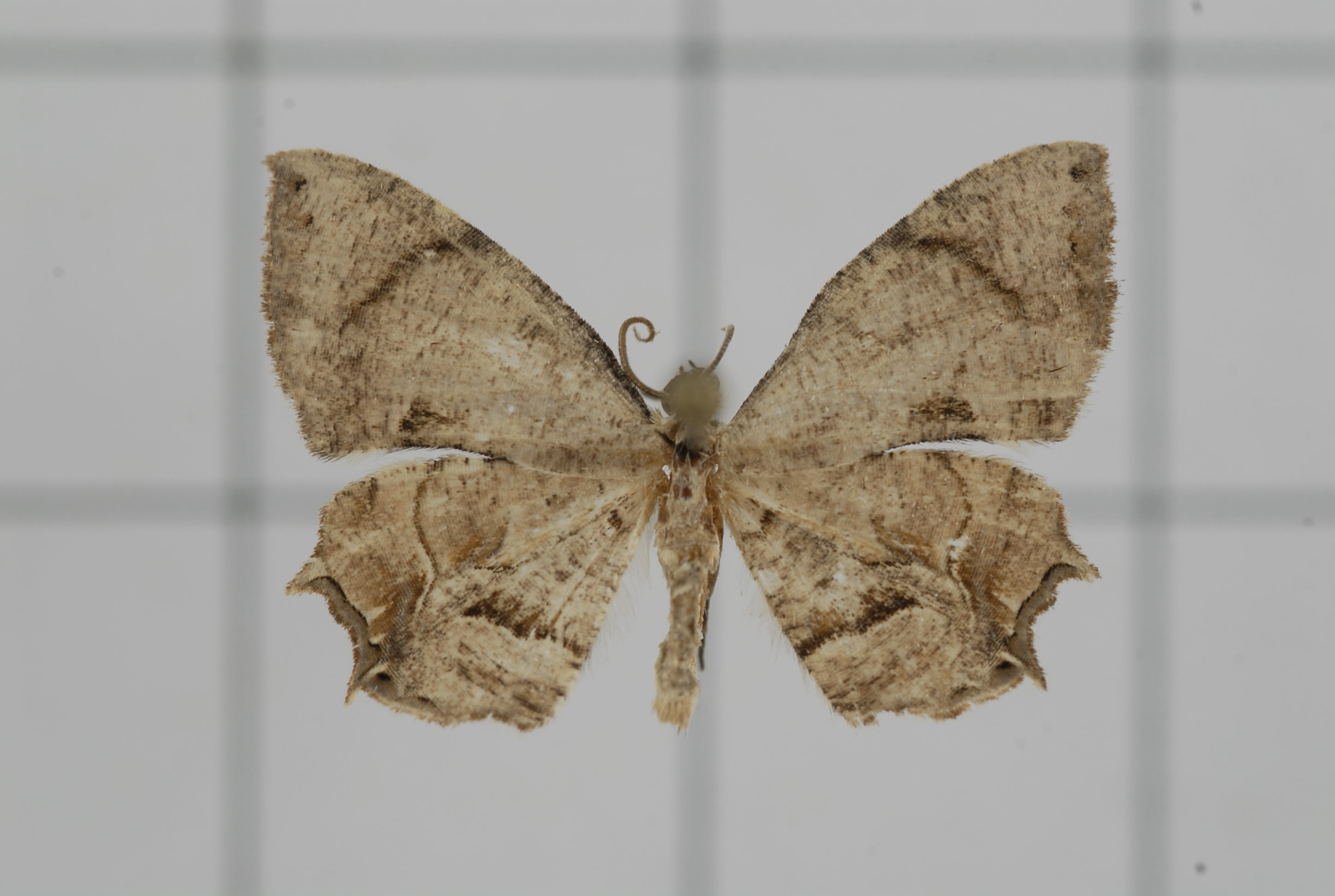

Scientific classification
- Domain: Eukaryota
- Kingdom: Animalia
- Phylum: Arthropoda
- Class: Insecta
- Order: Lepidoptera
- Family: Uraniidae
- Genus: Dysaethria
- Species: D. obscuraria

Binomial name
- Dysaethria obscuraria (Moore, 1887)

Synonyms
- Dirades obscuraria Moore, 1887

= Dysaethria obscuraria =

Species of moth

Dysaethria obscuraria is a moth of the family Uraniidae first described by Frederic Moore in 1887. It is found in India, Sri Lanka and Taiwan.
