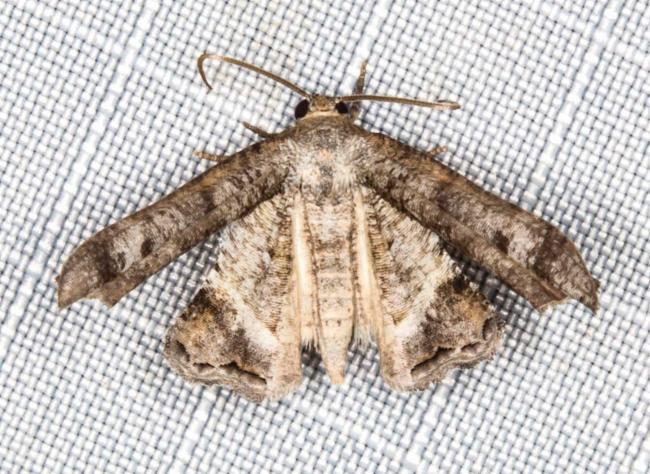

Scientific classification
- Domain: Eukaryota
- Kingdom: Animalia
- Phylum: Arthropoda
- Class: Insecta
- Order: Lepidoptera
- Family: Uraniidae
- Genus: Phazaca
- Species: P. interrupta

Binomial name
- Phazaca interrupta (Warren, 1896)

Synonyms
- Lobogethes interrupta Warren, W. 1896; Gathynia despecta Warren, 1898; Erosia radiata T. P. Lucas, 1898

= Phazaca interrupta =

Species of moth

Phazaca interrupta is a species of moth of the family Uraniidae first described by William Warren in 1896. It is found in Australia, where it has been recorded from Western Australia, Queensland and New South Wales.
