= Phazaca kellersi =

Scientific classification
- Domain: Eukaryota
- Kingdom: Animalia
- Phylum: Arthropoda
- Class: Insecta
- Order: Lepidoptera
- Family: Uraniidae
- Genus: Phazaca
- Species: P. kellersi

Binomial name
- Phazaca kellersi Tams, 1935

Species of moth

Phazaca kellersi is a species of moth of the family Uraniidae first described by Willie Horace Thomas Tams in 1935. It is found in Samoa and was described by two specimen from Tutuila collected by H.C. Kellers.
