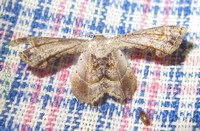

Scientific classification
- Kingdom: Animalia
- Phylum: Arthropoda
- Class: Insecta
- Order: Lepidoptera
- Family: Uraniidae
- Subfamily: Epipleminae
- Genus: Phazaca; Walker, 1863

Synonyms
- Dirades Walker, 1866; Lobogethes Warren, 1896; Diradopsis Warren, 1898; Homoplexis Warren, 1907; Balantiucha Turner, 1911

= Phazaca =

Genus of moths

Phazaca is a genus of moths in the family Uraniidae first described by Walker in 1863.

== Description ==
Palpi upturned, reaching vertex of head. Antennae thickened and flattened in male. Forewings broad. The outer margin evenly curved. Vein 5 from below the upper angle of cell and veins 6,7 and 8,9 stalked. vein 10 from cell. Hindwings usually with the outer margin produced to points at veins 4 and 7, slightly developed in male. Vein 5 from the middle of discocellulars. Veins 6 and 7 from angle of cell or shortly stalked. Male with a fold on inner area containing a tuft of long hair, veins 1b and 2 being distorted. Wings held more or less apart in repose.

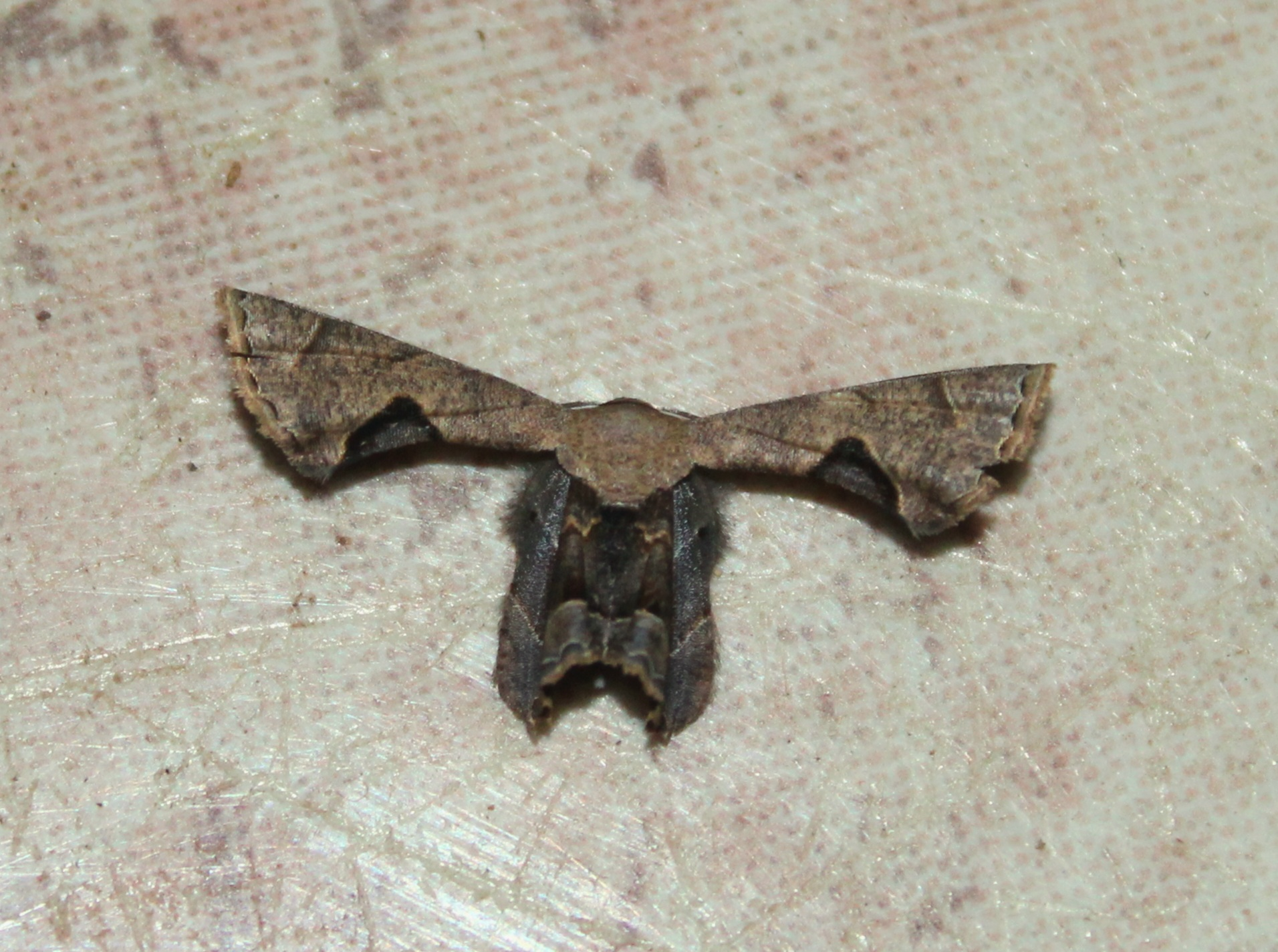
from Sri Lanka

== Species ==
- Phazaca acutilinea (Warren, 1897)
- Phazaca alikangensis (Strand, 1917)
- Phazaca cesena (Swinhoe, 1902)
- Phazaca cesenaleuca Holloway, 1998
- Phazaca conifera (Moore, 1887)
- Phazaca coniferoides Holloway, 1998
- Phazaca cyclocrossa (Turner, 1926)
- Phazaca cythera (Swinhoe, 1902)
- Phazaca decorata (Warren, 1898)
- Phazaca erosioides Walker, 1863
- Phazaca interrupta (Warren, 1896)
- Phazaca kellersi Tams, 1935 (from Samoa)
- Phazaca leucocephala (Walker, 1863)
- Phazaca leucocera (Hampson, 1891)
- Phazaca lugens (Warren, 1897)
- Phazaca monticesena Holloway, 1998
- Phazaca mutans (Butler, 1887)
- Phazaca perfallax (Warren, 1898)
- Phazaca planimargo (Warren, 1906)
- Phazaca rhombifera (Warren, 1897)
- Phazaca stolida (Butler, 1886)
- Phazaca theclata (Guenée, 1857)
- Phazaca unicauda (Dudgeon, 1905)
- Phazaca unicaudoides Holloway, 1998
