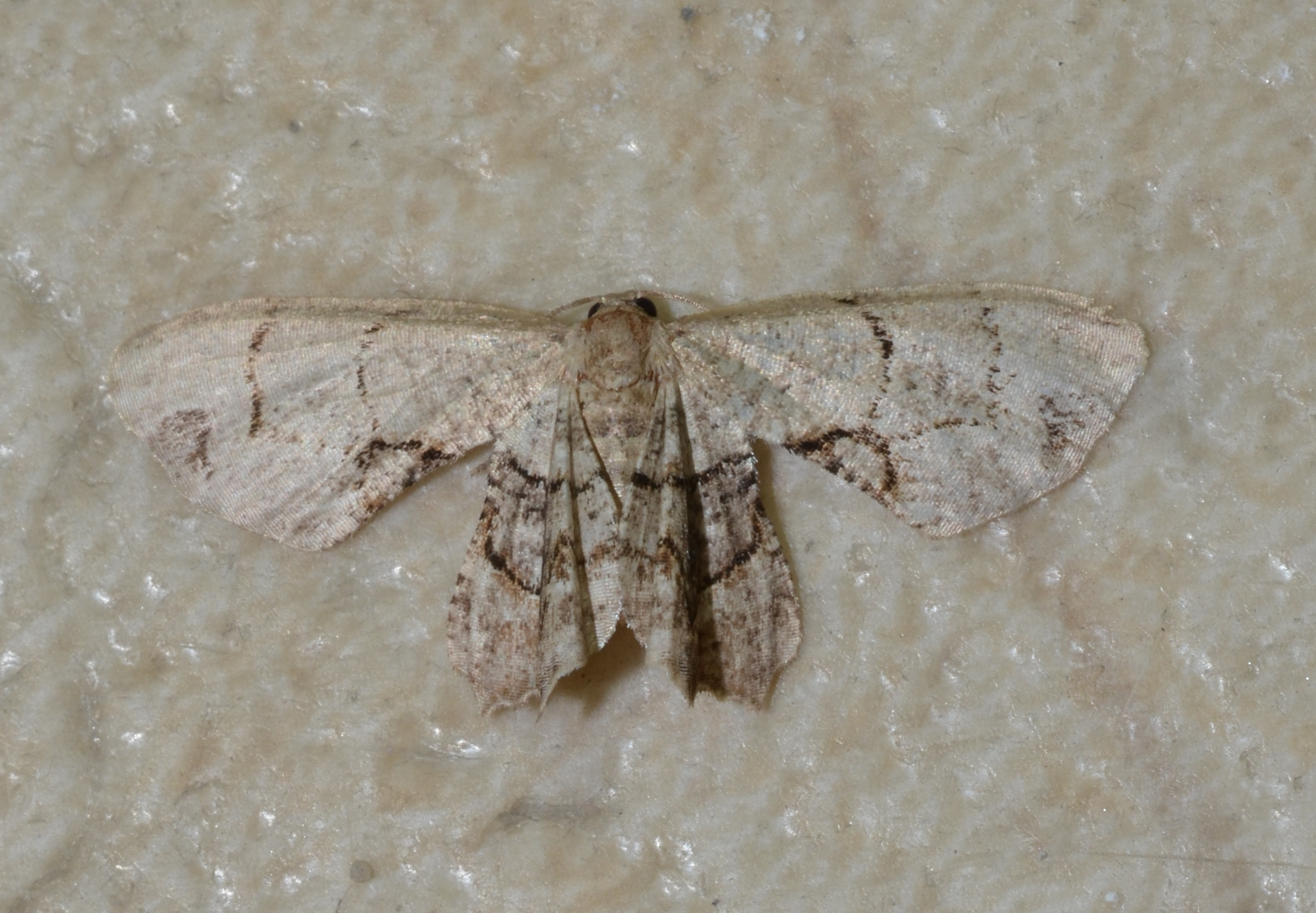
- Callizzia amorata

Scientific classification
- Kingdom: Animalia
- Phylum: Arthropoda
- Clade: Pancrustacea
- Class: Insecta
- Order: Lepidoptera
- Family: Uraniidae
- Subfamily: Epipleminae
- Genus: Callizzia; Packard, 1876

= Callizzia =

Genus of moths

Callizzia is a genus of scoopwing moths of the family Uraniidae. The genus was described by Packard in 1876. The adults' hindwings are sharply creased, forming a scoop shape. There are two species in the genus. The gray scoopwing moth (Callizzia amorata) is the type species of the genus, and the type specimen was collected in Albany, New York, in the United States.

== Species ==
- Callizzia amorata Packard, 1876 – gray scoopwing moth
- Callizzia certiorara Pearsall, 1906
