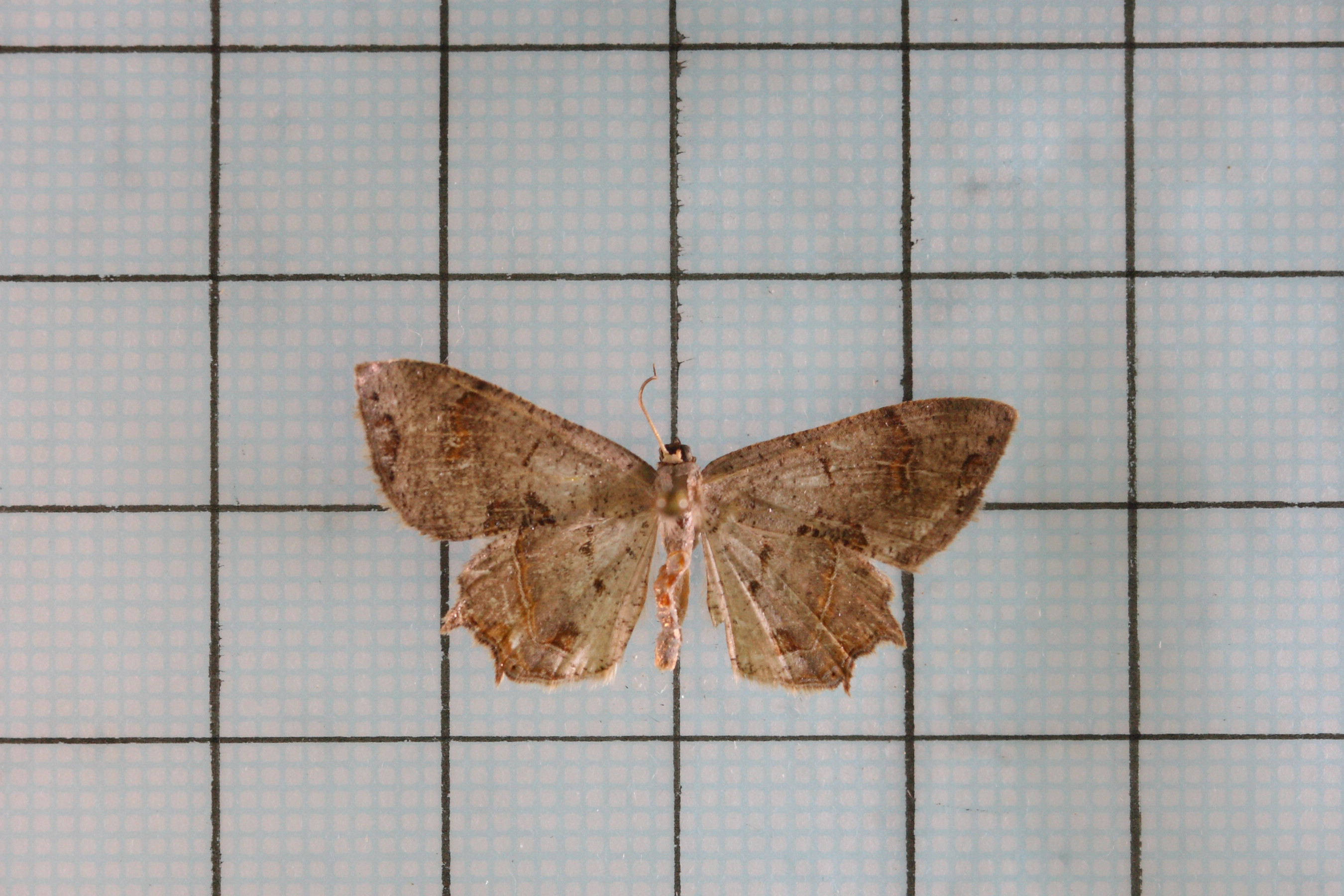

Scientific classification
- Kingdom: Animalia
- Phylum: Arthropoda
- Class: Insecta
- Order: Lepidoptera
- Family: Uraniidae
- Genus: Oroplema
- Species: O. oyamana

Binomial name
- Oroplema oyamana (Walker, 1866)

Synonyms
- Epiplema oyamana Matsumura 1931; Orplema oyamana

= Oroplema oyamana =

Species of moth

Oroplema oyamana is a species of moth of the family Uraniidae. It is found in Korea (Jeju Island), Japan (Honshu, Shikoku, Kyushu, Yakushima Island), Taiwan, northern India, Nepal, Borneo and the Philippines (Luzon).

The wingspan is 25–28 mm.

The larvae feed on Daphniphyllum himalaense and possibly Daphniphyllum teysmanni and Daphniphyllum macropodum.
