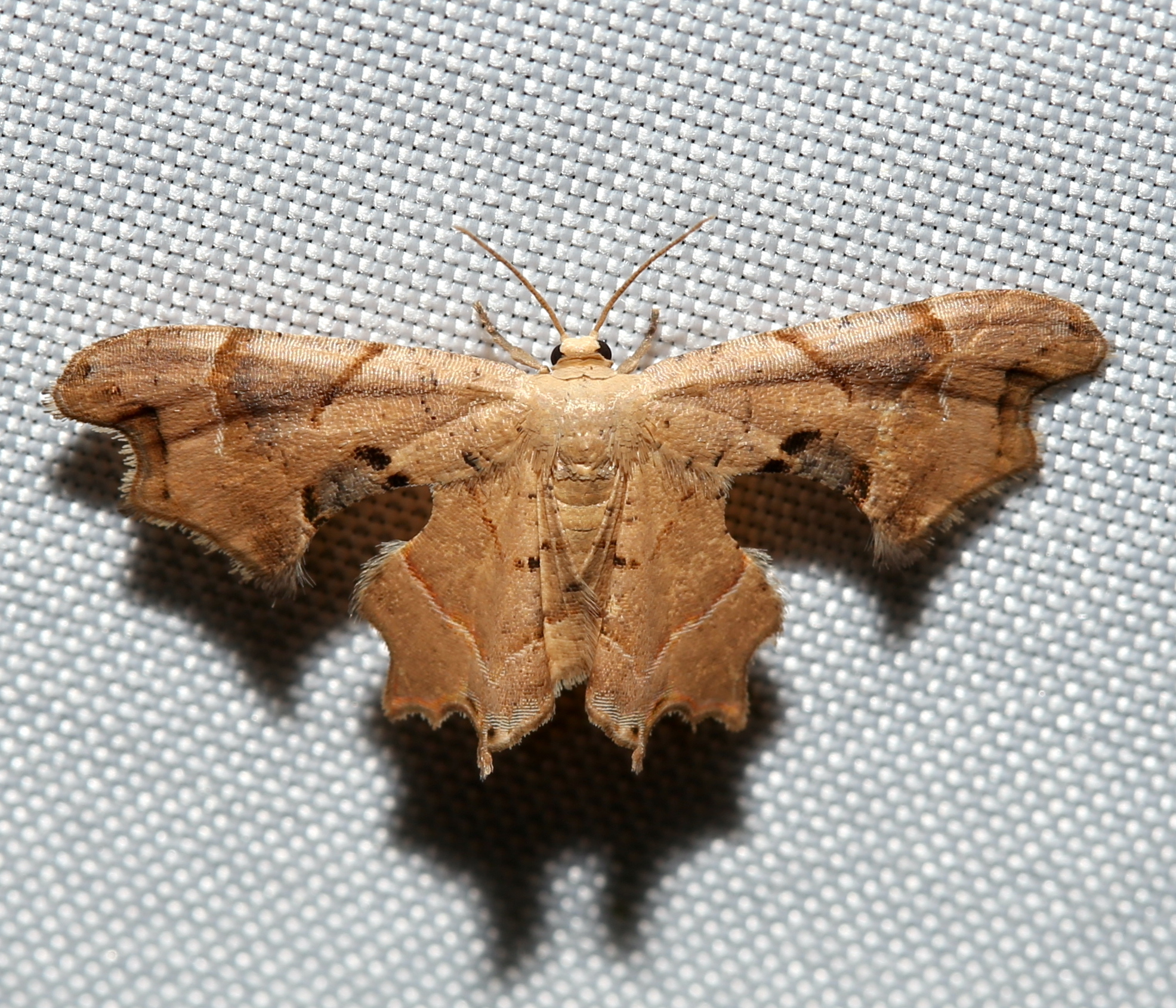
- Calledapteryx dryopterata

Scientific classification
- Kingdom: Animalia
- Phylum: Arthropoda
- Class: Insecta
- Order: Lepidoptera
- Family: Uraniidae
- Genus: Calledapteryx; Grote, 1868
- Species: C. dryopterata

Binomial name
- Calledapteryx dryopterata Grote, 1868

= Calledapteryx =

Genus of moths

Calledapteryx is a monotypic scoopwing moth genus in the family Uraniidae. Its only species, Calledapteryx dryopterata, the brown scoopwing moth, is found in eastern North America. Both the genus and species were first described by Augustus Radcliffe Grote in 1868.

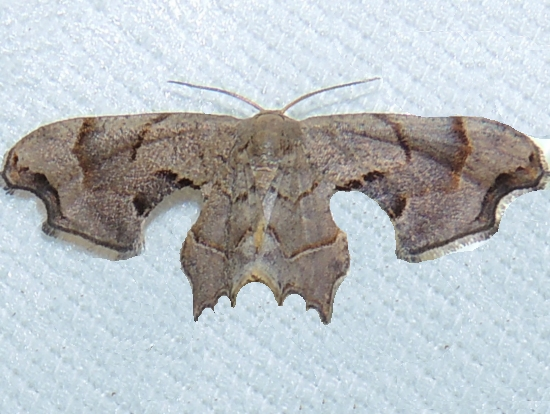
