= Chundana emarginata =

Scientific classification
- Kingdom: Animalia
- Phylum: Arthropoda
- Clade: Pancrustacea
- Class: Insecta
- Order: Lepidoptera
- Family: Uraniidae
- Genus: Chundana
- Species: C. emarginata

Binomial name
- Chundana emarginata (Hampson, 1891)

Synonyms
- Azata emarginatus Hampson, 1891; Metorthocheilus emarginatus Hampson, 1891

Species of moth

Chundana emarginata is a moth of the family Uraniidae first described by George Hampson in 1891. It is found in the Indian subregion, Sri Lanka, Taiwan, Borneo, Java and Seram.

Its wings are grey with brown irrorations (speckles). Margin of the forewing strongly excavate subapically. Wing apex is almost bifalcate. Hindwings narrow, triangular. Pale discal spots can be seen on both wings. The caterpillar is cylindrical. Body greyish and head rufous. Black spots found on the head and ringing each segment. Its host plants are Wendlandia species.
