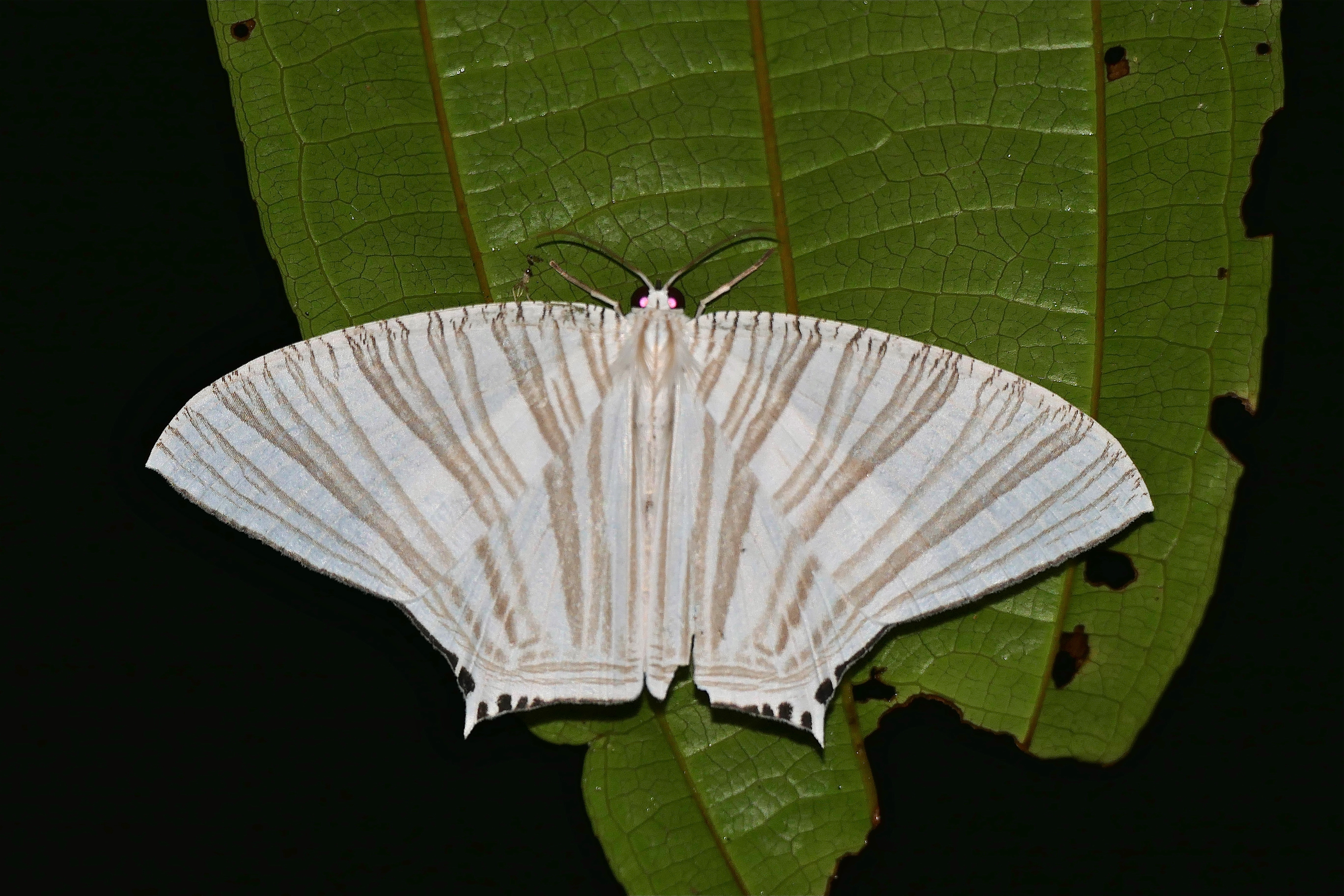

Scientific classification
- Kingdom: Animalia
- Phylum: Arthropoda
- Clade: Pancrustacea
- Class: Insecta
- Order: Lepidoptera
- Family: Uraniidae
- Genus: Strophidia
- Species: S. caudata

Binomial name
- Strophidia caudata Fabricius, 1781

Synonyms
- Phalaena caudata Fabricius, 1781; Phalaena fasciata Cramer, 1777; Micronia obtusata Guenée, 1857

= Strophidia caudata =

Species of moth

Strophidia caudata is a moth of the family Uraniidae first described by Johan Christian Fabricius in 1781. It is found in the Indian subregion, Sri Lanka, to Peninsular Malaysia, Borneo and Sulawesi.

It is a whitish moth with darker fasciations. The fasciae are numerous subbasally on the forewing. Series of black dots found on tail of hindwings.
