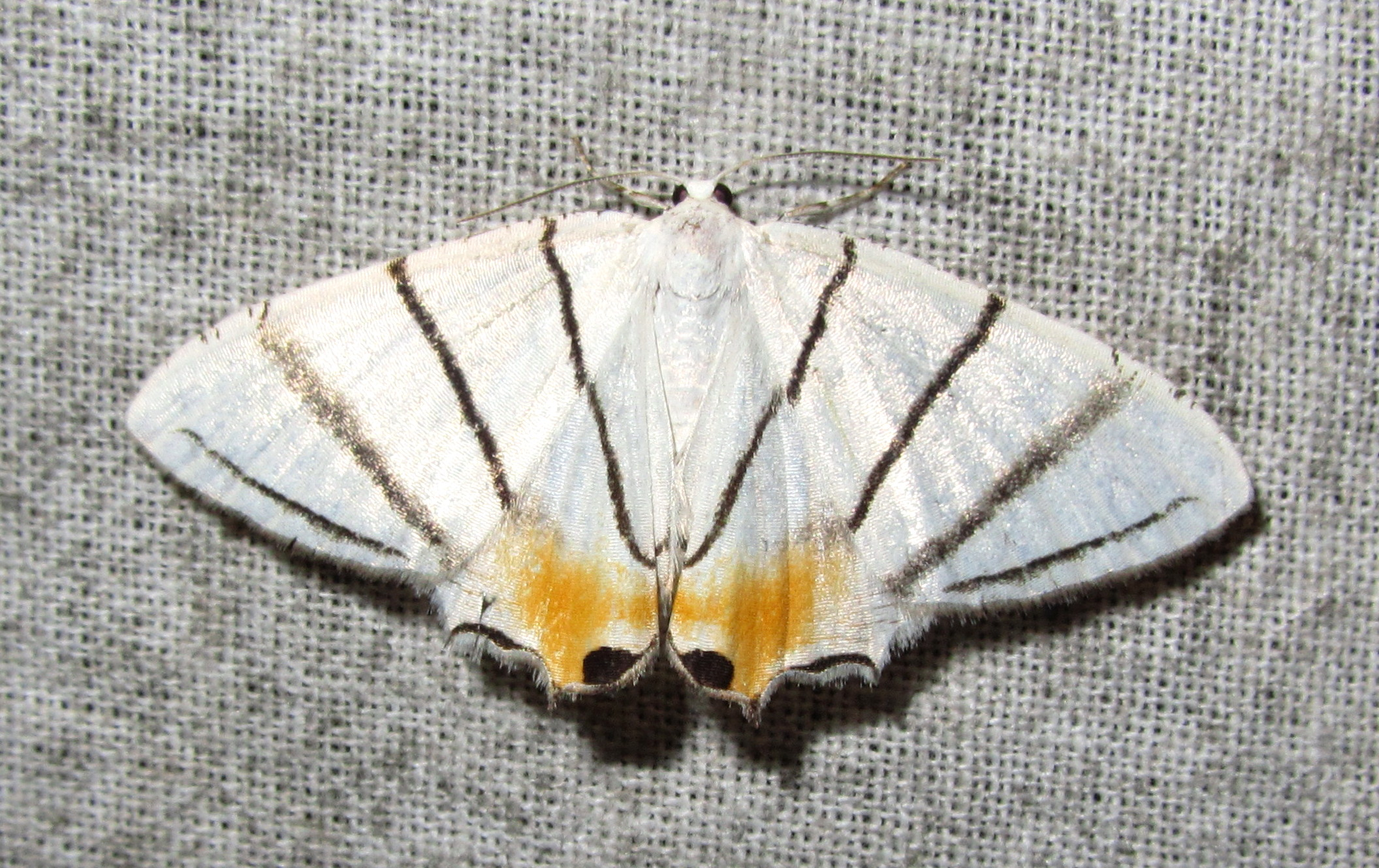

Scientific classification
- Kingdom: Animalia
- Phylum: Arthropoda
- Class: Insecta
- Order: Lepidoptera
- Family: Uraniidae
- Genus: Epiplema
- Species: E. himala

Binomial name
- Epiplema himala (Butler, 1880)

Synonyms
- Erosia himala Butler, 1880; Epiplema evanescens Alphéraky, 1897

= Epiplema himala =

Species of moth

Epiplema himala is a species of moth of the family Uraniidae. It is found in Asia, including India and China.
