= Europlema conchiferata =

Scientific classification
- Domain: Eukaryota
- Kingdom: Animalia
- Phylum: Arthropoda
- Class: Insecta
- Order: Lepidoptera
- Family: Uraniidae
- Genus: Europlema
- Species: E. conchiferata

Binomial name
- Europlema conchiferata Moore, 1887

Species of moth

Europlema conchiferata is a moth of the family Uraniidae first described by Frederic Moore in 1887. It is found in Fiji and Sri Lanka.
