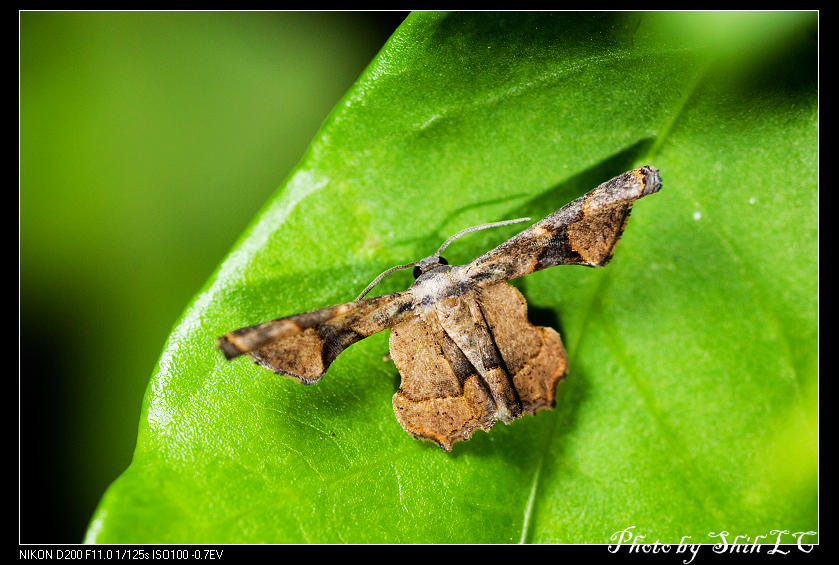

Scientific classification
- Kingdom: Animalia
- Phylum: Arthropoda
- Class: Insecta
- Order: Lepidoptera
- Family: Uraniidae
- Genus: Monobolodes
- Species: M. prunaria

Binomial name
- Monobolodes prunaria (Moore, 1887)

Synonyms
- Dirades prunaria Moore, 1887; Gathynia fasciaria Leech, 1897; Phazaca oribates West, 1932

= Monobolodes prunaria =

Species of moth

Monobolodes prunaria is a species of moth of the family Uraniidae first described by Frederic Moore in 1887. It is found in Sri Lanka, India, Taiwan, Hong Kong, Korea, Japan (Honshu, Shikoku, Kyushu, the Ryukyu Islands) and possibly Borneo.

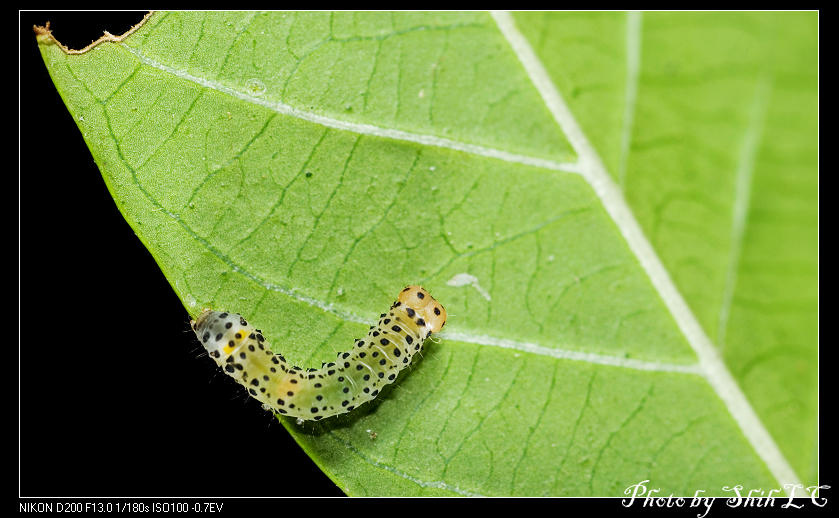
Larva

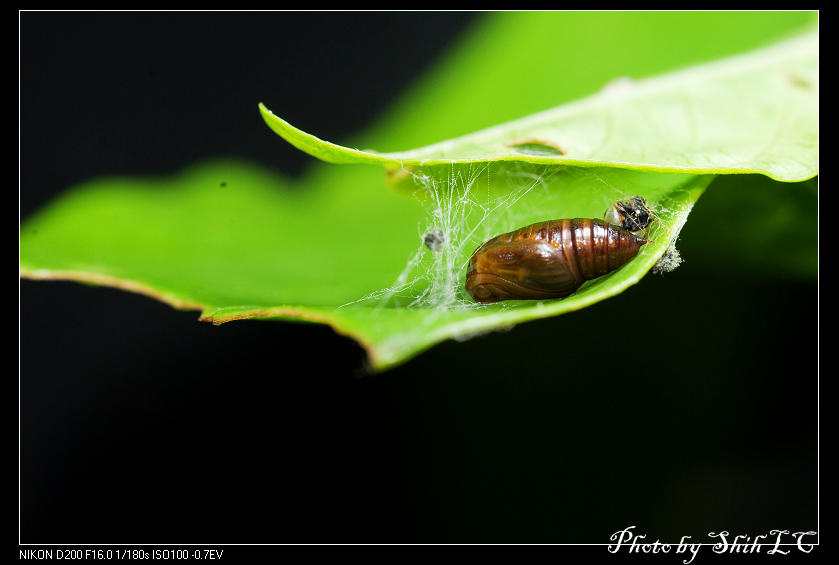
Pupa

== Description ==
The wingspan is about 16–20 mm.

The larvae feed on Gardenia species, including Gardenia jasminoides.
