= Oroplema simplex =

Scientific classification
- Domain: Eukaryota
- Kingdom: Animalia
- Phylum: Arthropoda
- Class: Insecta
- Order: Lepidoptera
- Family: Uraniidae
- Genus: Oroplema
- Species: O. simplex

Binomial name
- Oroplema simplex (Warren, 1899)

Synonyms
- Epiplema simplex Warren, 1899

Species of moth

Oroplema simplex is a species of moth of the family Uraniidae. It is found in southern India and Sri Lanka.
