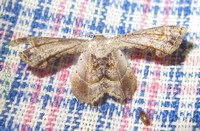

Scientific classification
- Domain: Eukaryota
- Kingdom: Animalia
- Phylum: Arthropoda
- Class: Insecta
- Order: Lepidoptera
- Family: Uraniidae
- Genus: Phazaca
- Species: P. theclata

Binomial name
- Phazaca theclata (Guenée, 1858)

Synonyms
- Dirades theclata; Erosia theclata Guenee 1857; Erosia sigillata Mabille, 1898; Dirades binotata Walker, 1866

= Phazaca theclata =

Cotton leaf roller

Species of moth

Phazaca theclata is a moth of the family Uraniidae. It was first described by Achille Guenée in 1858. It is known from Africa south of the Sahara, from Saudi Arabia, as well as from India, Japan, Myanmar, Nepal and Sri Lanka.

== Description ==
Its wingspan is around 17–22 mm. The hindwings of the male have slight tails at veins 4 and 7, and the venation is normal. In males, the antennae and vertex of the head are whitish. Head and thorax violaceous (violet) grey. Abdomen ochreous, except at base. Forewings violaceous grey. A large triangular patch outlined with double brown line on the costa beyond the middle. There is a similar oval spot with darker centre on inner margin. There is a series of marginal fuscous lunules. Hindwings with the basal half violaceous grey, which is darkest at inner margin. The outer half pale ochreous brown, the two areas defined by a rufous and pale line. There is a series of marginal fuscous lunules. Female has same violaceous abdomen and hindwings as the ground colour.

Larva feeds on Verbenaceae species, including Stachytarpheta urticifolia and plants like Adina cordifolia, Burttdavya nyasica, Morinda sp., Randia dumetorum, Tectona grandis, Paraserianthes falcataria, Coddia rudis and Duranta erecta
