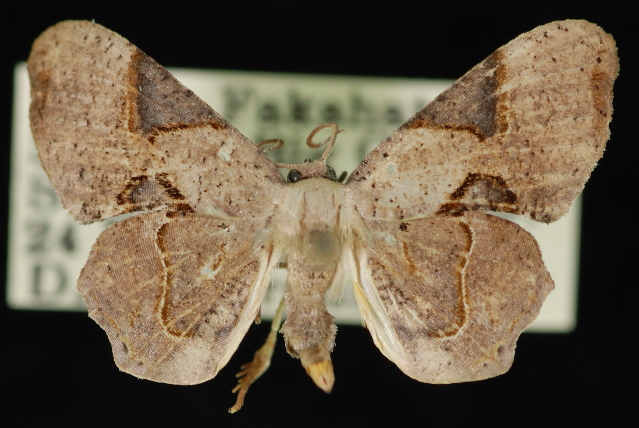
- Philagraula slossoniae

Scientific classification
- Domain: Eukaryota
- Kingdom: Animalia
- Phylum: Arthropoda
- Class: Insecta
- Order: Lepidoptera
- Family: Uraniidae
- Genus: Philagraula; Hulst, 1896
- Species: P. slossoniae

Binomial name
- Philagraula slossoniae Hulst, 1896

= Philagraula =

Genus of moths

Philagraula is a genus of scoopwing moths in the family Uraniidae. There is one described species in Philagraula, P. slossoniae.
