= Decetia subobscurata =

Scientific classification
- Kingdom: Animalia
- Phylum: Arthropoda
- Clade: Pancrustacea
- Class: Insecta
- Order: Lepidoptera
- Family: Uraniidae
- Genus: Decetia
- Species: D. subobscurata

Binomial name
- Decetia subobscurata Walker, 1862

Species of moth

Decetia subobscurata is a moth of the family Uraniidae first described by Francis Walker in 1862. It is found in South India and Sri Lanka.

The caterpillar is fusiform (spindle shaped) with centrally fattest body. Head small and squarely round. Body light green with sub dorsal and lateral white longitudinal bands. In between the lateral bands and the white-ringed spiracles, black speckles are found. Pupa claviform and cremaster with four pairs of hooked shaftlets. The host plant is Olax imbricata.
