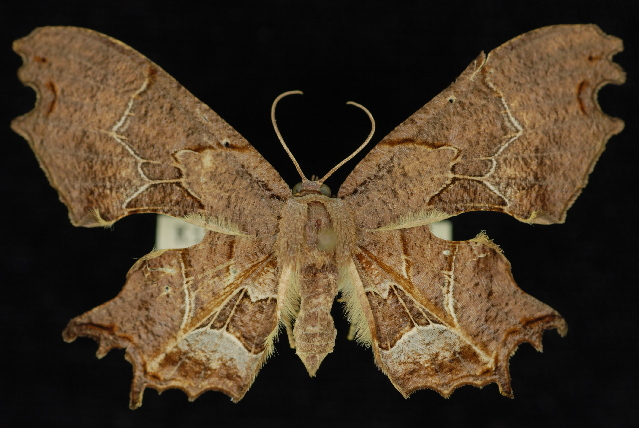
- Erosia incendiata

Scientific classification
- Kingdom: Animalia
- Phylum: Arthropoda
- Class: Insecta
- Order: Lepidoptera
- Family: Uraniidae
- Genus: Erosia; Guenée, 1857
- Species: E. incendiata

Binomial name
- Erosia incendiata (Guenée, 1857)

= Erosia =

Genus of moths

Erosia is a genus of scoopwing moths in the family Uraniidae. There is one described species in Erosia, E. incendiata.
