= Pterotosoma =

Scientific classification
- Domain: Eukaryota
- Kingdom: Animalia
- Phylum: Arthropoda
- Class: Insecta
- Order: Lepidoptera
- Family: Uraniidae
- Genus: Pterotosoma; Warren, 1903

Genus of moths

Pterotosoma is a genus of moths in the family Uraniidae first described by Warren in 1903.

== Species ==
- Pterotosoma bilineata Warren, 1903
- Pterotosoma castanea (Warren, 1898)
