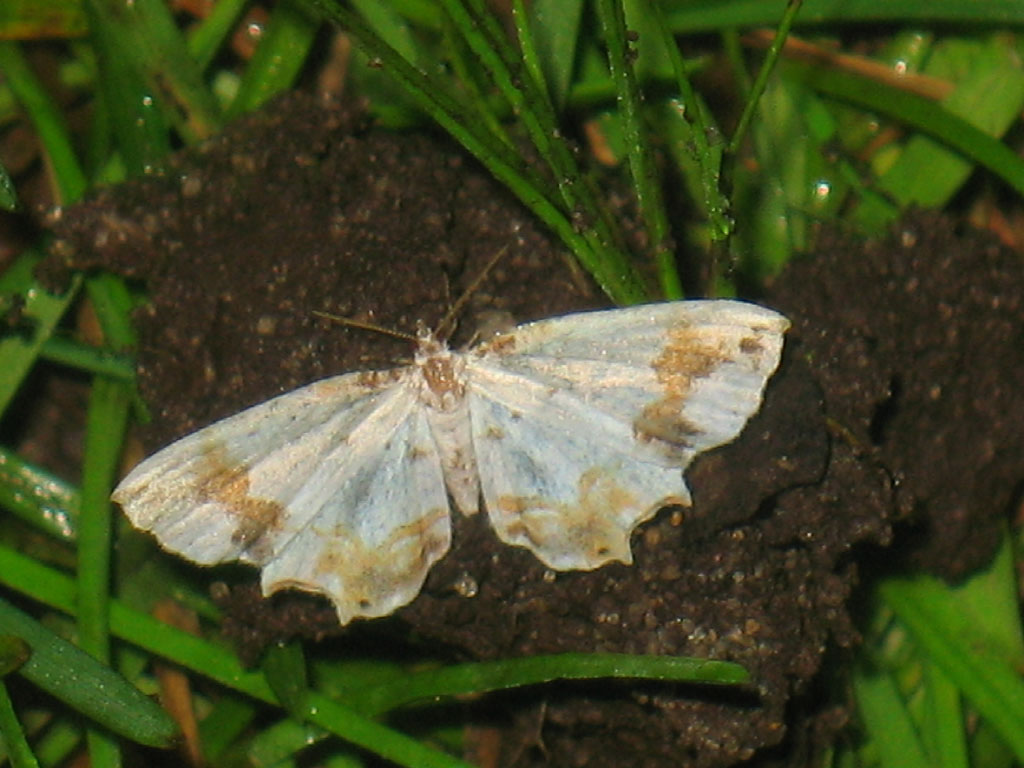

Scientific classification
- Domain: Eukaryota
- Kingdom: Animalia
- Phylum: Arthropoda
- Class: Insecta
- Order: Lepidoptera
- Family: Uraniidae
- Genus: Eversmannia
- Species: E. exornata

Binomial name
- Eversmannia exornata Eversmann

= Eversmannia exornata =

Species of moth

Eversmannia exornata is a species of moth, belonging to the family Uraniidae. The species was described in 1837 by Eduard Friedrich Eversmann as Idaea exornata. It is native to Eastern Europe. The species has also been found within Western Siberia, as far east as the Altai Krai. This is the only moth within the Uraniidae family known to inhabit the West of Palearctic.

The amount of observed sites and specimen has steadily increased in late 20th century after a nearly century-long absence. This increase in numbers has been suggested by E. M. Antonova of Zoological Museum of Moscow University to be linked to increasing disturbance of local ecosystems.
