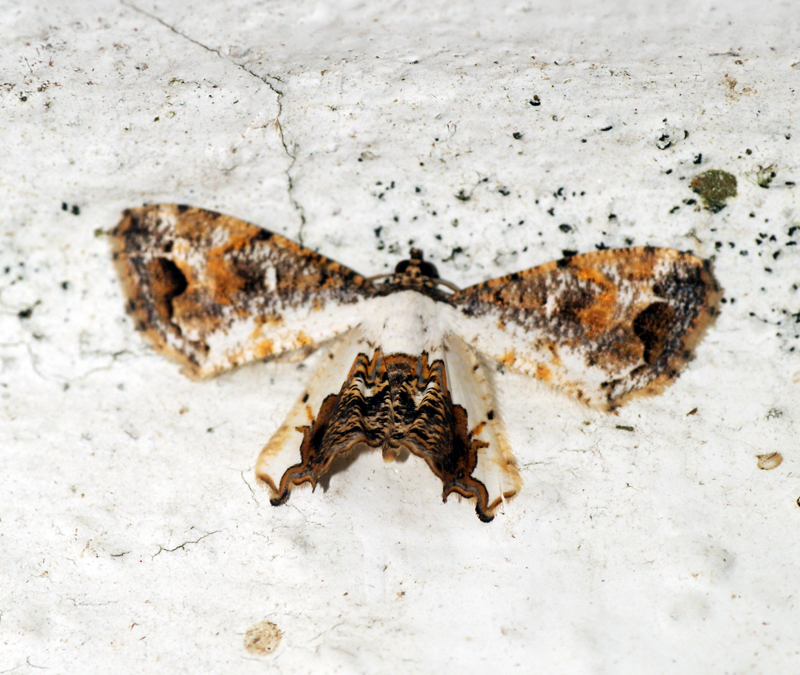
- A moth of the Europlema genus

Scientific classification
- Kingdom: Animalia
- Phylum: Arthropoda
- Clade: Pancrustacea
- Class: Insecta
- Order: Lepidoptera
- Family: Uraniidae
- Subfamily: Epipleminae
- Genus: Europlema; Holloway, 1998

= Europlema =

Genus of moths

Europlema is a genus of moths in the family Uraniidae. The genus was erected by Jeremy Daniel Holloway in 1998.

== Species ==
- Europlema bilobuncus Holloway, 1998
- Europlema conchiferata (Moore, 1887)
- Europlema desistaria (Walker, 1861)
- Europlema instabilata (Walker, 1866)
- Europlema irrorata (Moore, 1887)
- Europlema melanosticta (de Joannis, 1915)
- Europlema nigropustulata (Warren, 1905)
- Europlema nivosaria (Walker, 1866)
- Europlema poecilaria (Swinhoe, 1905)
- Europlema quadripunctata (Wileman, 1916)
- Europlema semibrunnea (Pagenstecher, 1884)
- Europlema vacuata (Warren, 1905)
