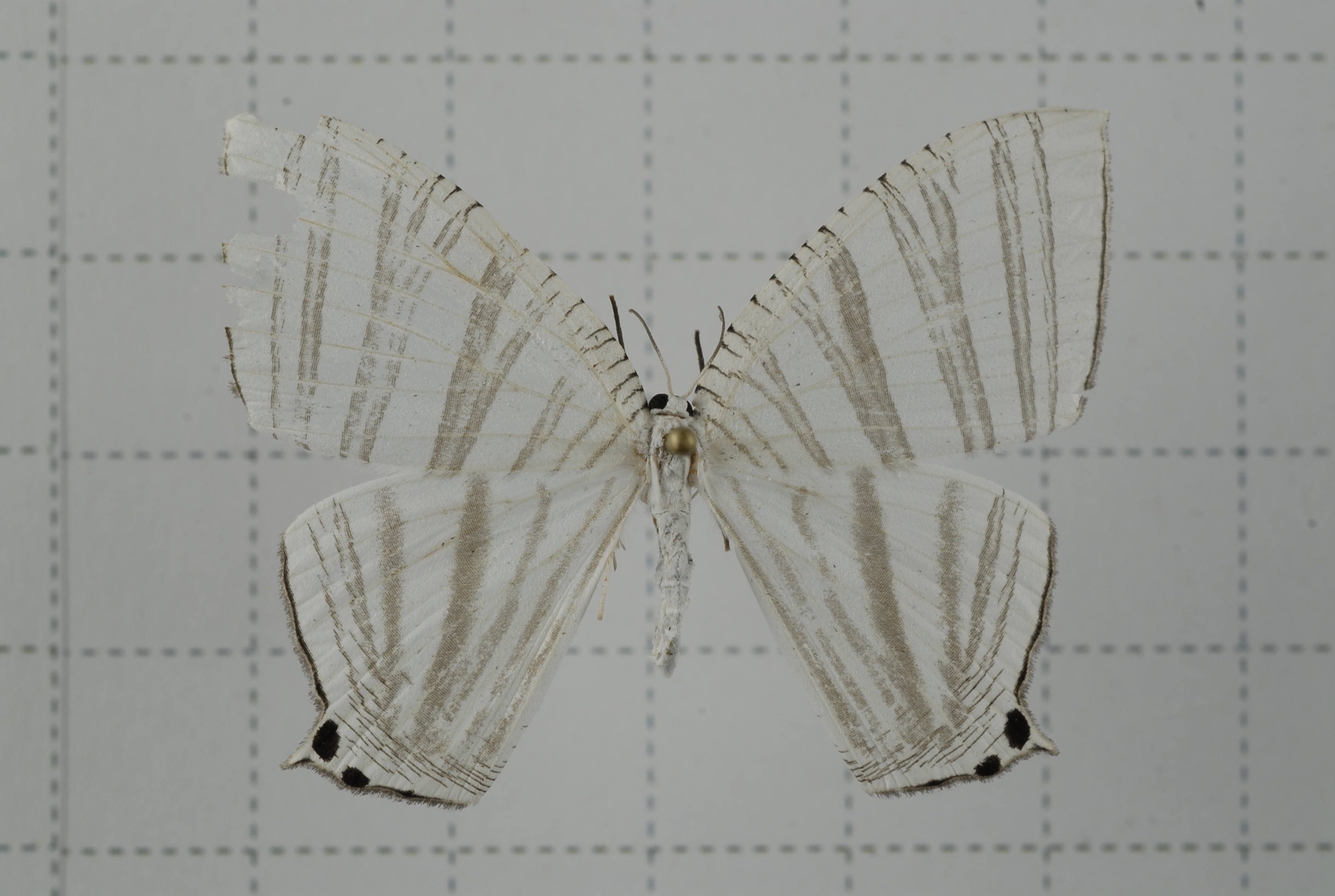

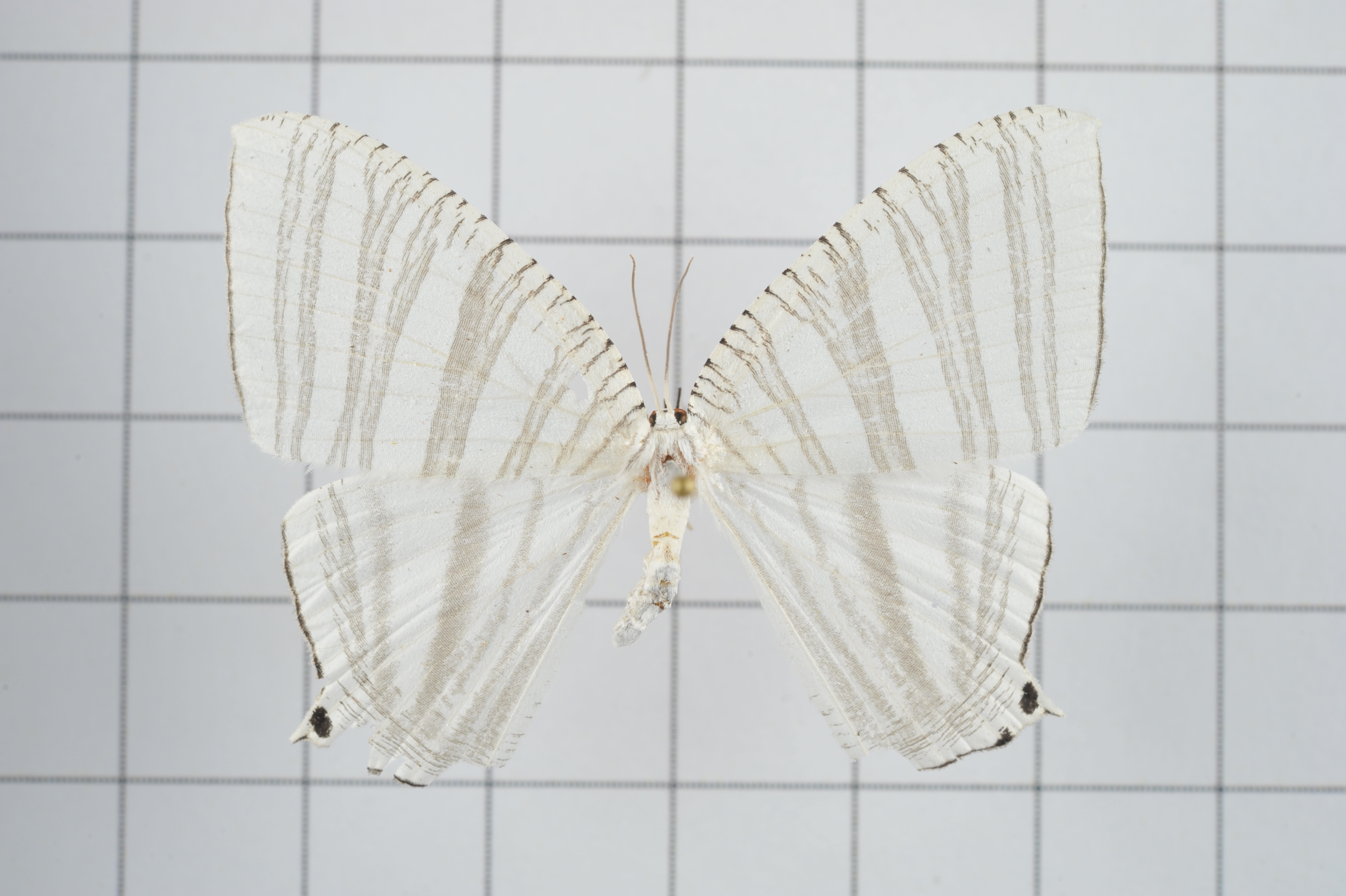

Scientific classification
- Kingdom: Animalia
- Phylum: Arthropoda
- Class: Insecta
- Order: Lepidoptera
- Family: Uraniidae
- Genus: Pseudomicronia
- Species: P. advocataria

Binomial name
- Pseudomicronia advocataria (Walker, 1861)

Synonyms
- Micronia advocataria Walker, 1861; Pseudomicronia caelata Moore, [1887]; Pseudomicronia caelata Moore, 1888; Pseudomicronia simpleifascia Swinhoe, 1894; Pseudomicronia fasciata Wileman, 1914

= Pseudomicronia advocataria =

Species of moth

Pseudomicronia advocataria is a moth of the family Uraniidae first described by Francis Walker in 1861. It is found in the Philippines, Sundaland, the Andaman Islands, India, Taiwan, South China and Sri Lanka.

It is a white moth with black fasciations. Black dots are found on the tail margins of the hindwings.
