= Pseudomicronia fraterna =

Scientific classification
- Domain: Eukaryota
- Kingdom: Animalia
- Phylum: Arthropoda
- Class: Insecta
- Order: Lepidoptera
- Family: Uraniidae
- Genus: Pseudomicronia
- Species: P. fraterna

Binomial name
- Pseudomicronia fraterna Moore

Species of moth

Pseudomicronia fraterna is a moth of the family Uraniidae. It is found in Sri Lanka.
