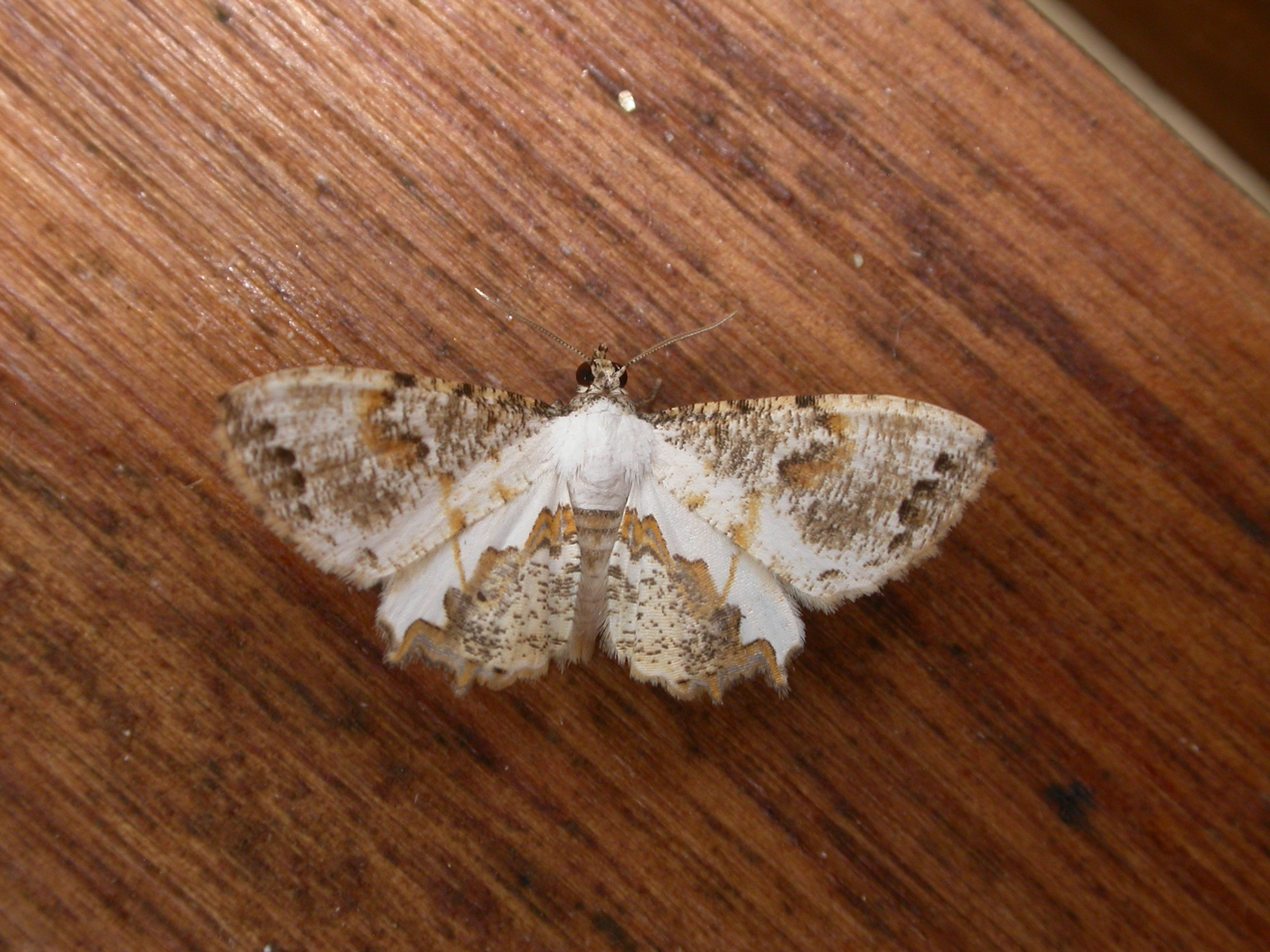

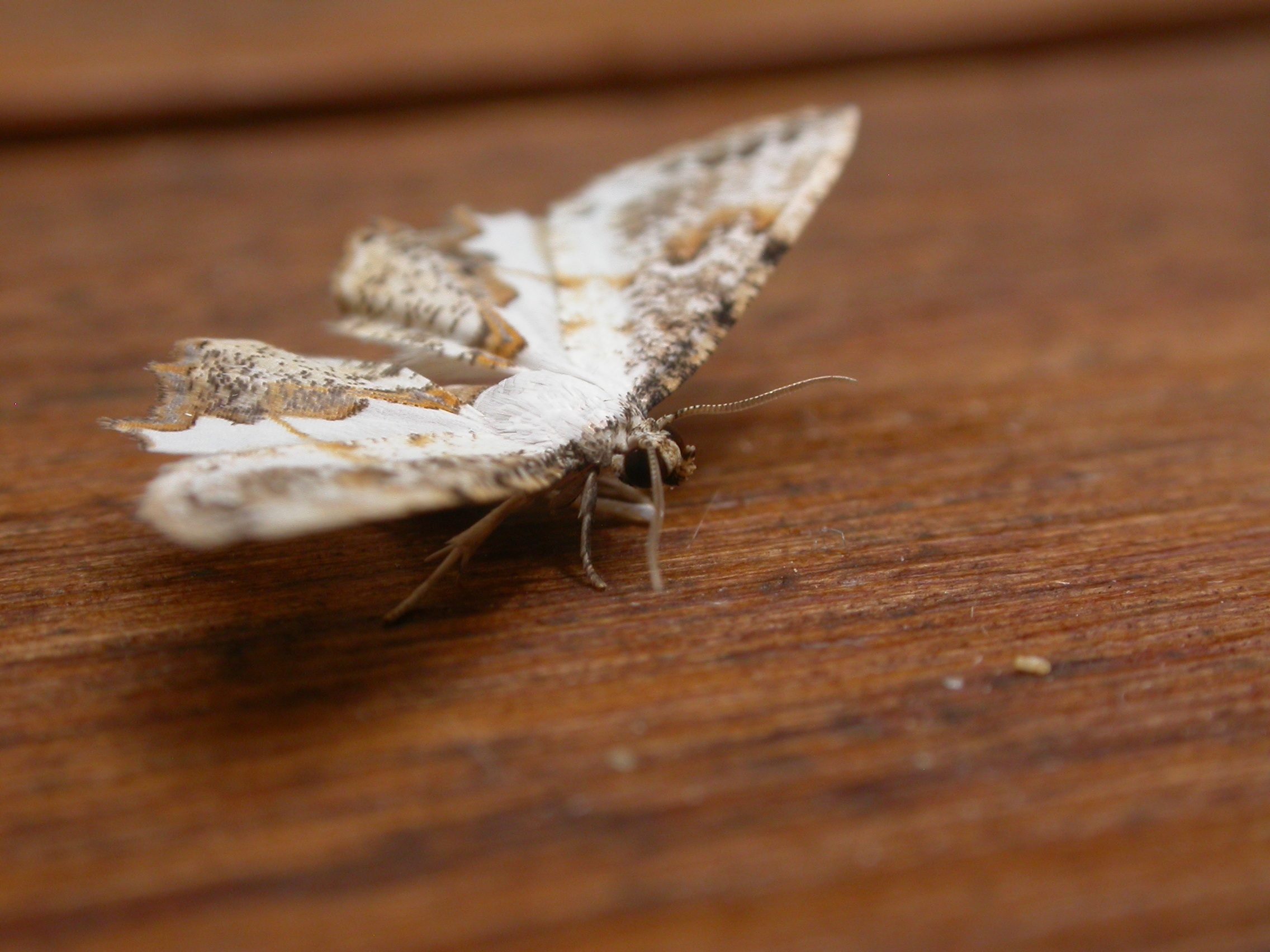

Scientific classification
- Kingdom: Animalia
- Phylum: Arthropoda
- Class: Insecta
- Order: Lepidoptera
- Family: Uraniidae
- Genus: Europlema
- Species: E. desistaria

Binomial name
- Europlema desistaria (Walker, 1861)

Synonyms
- Erosia desistaria Walker, 1861; Epiplema desistaria; Erosia inclarata Walker, 1866; Erosia insolita Walker, 1866; Epiplema instabilata fuscata Warren, 1897; Epiplema fuscata Dalla Torre, 1924

= Europlema desistaria =

Species of moth

Europlema desistaria is a species of moth of the family Uraniidae first described by Francis Walker in 1861. It is found in India, Sri Lanka, Myanmar, Thailand, Taiwan, Borneo, Sulawesi, Flores and Queensland.

== Description ==
The moth's wingspan is about 24 mm. Its forewings have an evenly curved outer margin, and its hindwings have slight tails at veins 4 and 7. Its head and collar are fuscous. Its thorax and the first segment of its abdomen are white; the other segments are fuscous. Its forewings are thickly speckled and striated with brown, fulvous and black, the inner area white slightly marked with fuscous. There is a white spot on the cilia. Its hindwings have a white costal area, while the rest of the wing is fulvous and striated with black. The outline between the two areas is very irregular. A laden grey marginal line can be seen from the tail at vein 7 to anal angle.
