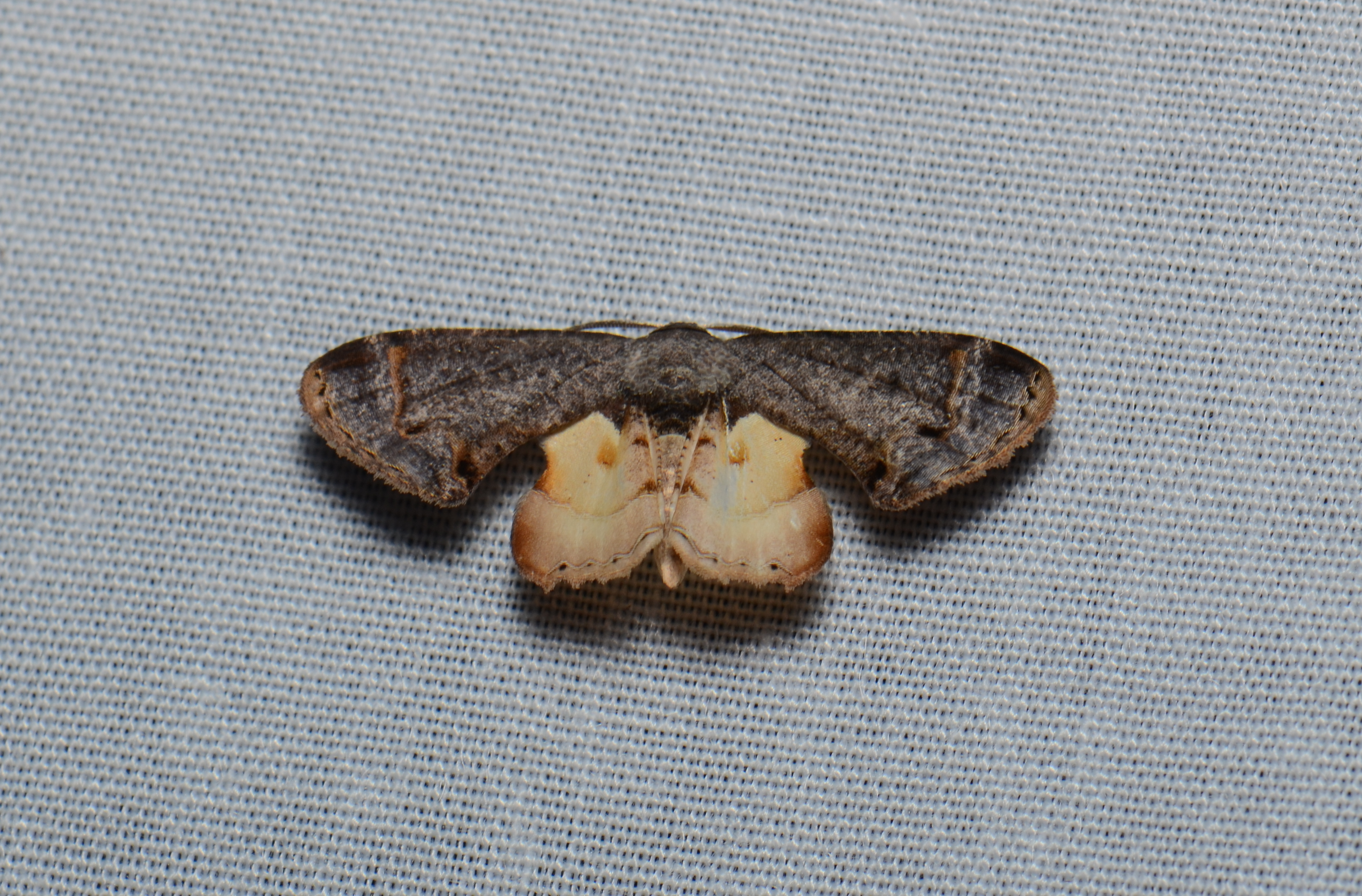

Scientific classification
- Kingdom: Animalia
- Phylum: Arthropoda
- Class: Insecta
- Order: Lepidoptera
- Family: Uraniidae
- Genus: Phazaca
- Species: P. erosioides

Binomial name
- Phazaca erosioides (Walker, 1863)

Synonyms
- Epiplema undulata Warren, 1896; Epiplema kohistaria Swinhoe, 1900; Phazaca pedionoma West, 1932

= Phazaca erosioides =

Species of moth

Phazaca erosioides is a moth of the family Uraniidae first described by Francis Walker in 1863. It is found in the Indo-Australian tropics from Sri Lanka to New Guinea.

In the male, the forewings are grey and the hindwings are pale yellow. The female has similar colours in the forewings, but the hindwings dark grey. The postmedial of forewing is similarly sinuous in both sexes.
