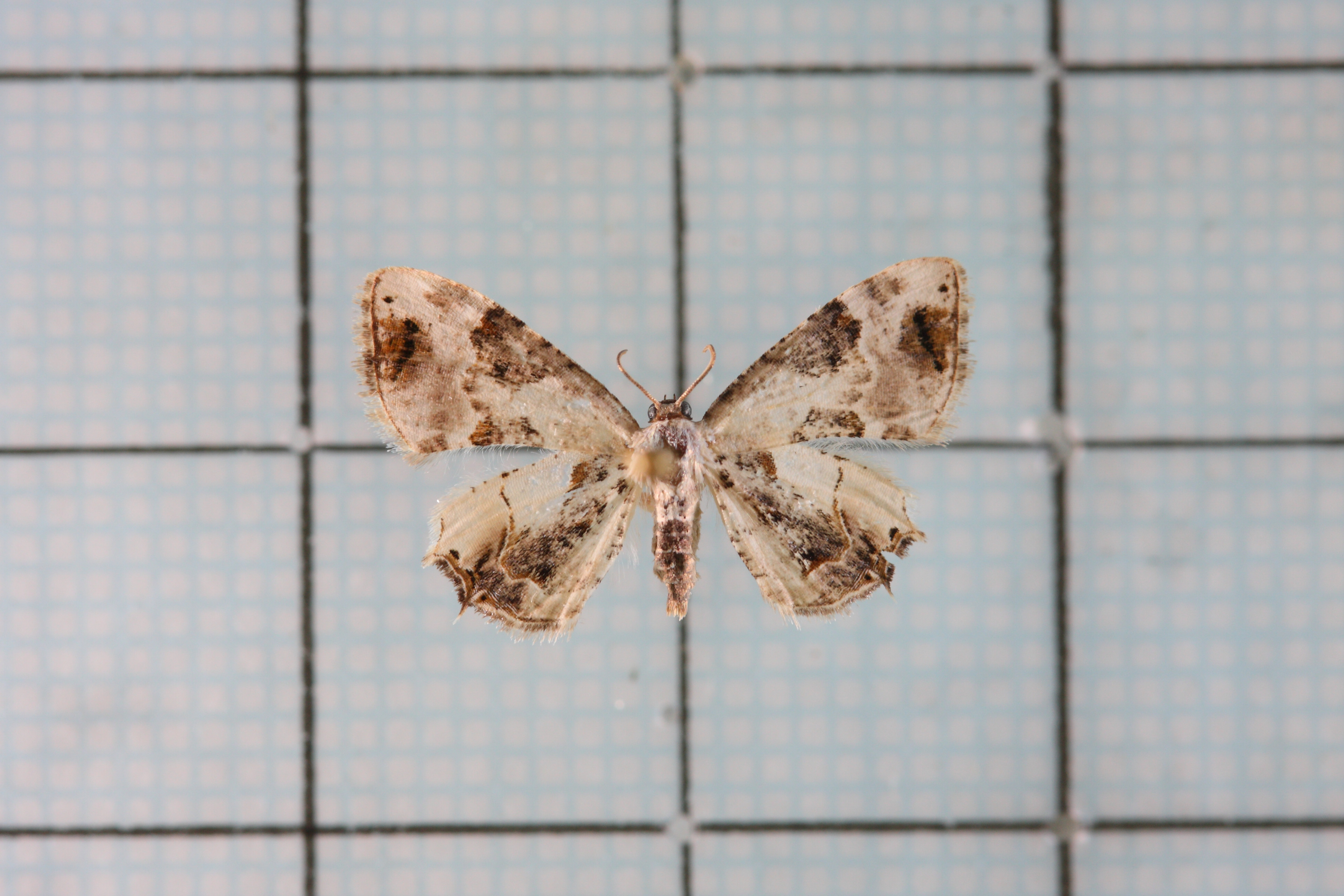

Scientific classification
- Kingdom: Animalia
- Phylum: Arthropoda
- Clade: Pancrustacea
- Class: Insecta
- Order: Lepidoptera
- Family: Uraniidae
- Genus: Oroplema
- Species: O. plagifera

Binomial name
- Oroplema plagifera (Butler, 1881)

Synonyms
- Eriosia plagifera Butler 1881; Epiplema plagifera; Orplema plagifera; Epiplema plagiata; Eversmannia plagifera; Epiplema sponsa Swinhoe, 1895

= Oroplema plagifera =

Species of moth

Oroplema plagifera is a moth of the family Uraniidae first described by Arthur Gardiner Butler in 1881. It is found on the Korean Peninsula and in Japan (Hokkaido, Honshu, Shikoku, Kyushu, Yakushima Island), eastern China, Russia (Sakhalin), Taiwan and northern India.

The wingspan is 15–18 mm for males and 17–21 mm for females. They resemble bird droppings. There are two generations per year in Korea.

The larvae feed on Viburnum dilatatum and Viburnum furcatum.
