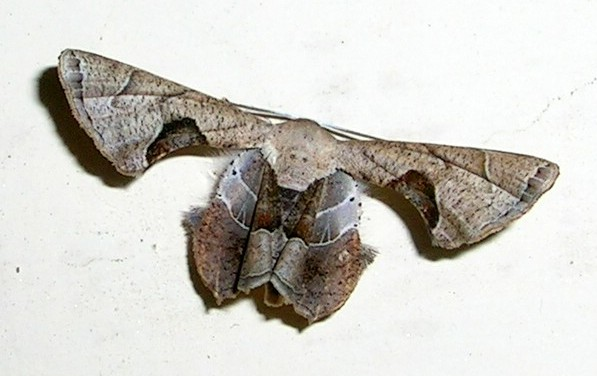

Scientific classification
- Kingdom: Animalia
- Phylum: Arthropoda
- Class: Insecta
- Order: Lepidoptera
- Family: Uraniidae
- Genus: Phazaca
- Species: P. leucocera

Binomial name
- Phazaca leucocera (Hampson, 1891)

Synonyms
- Dirades leucocera Hampson, 1891

= Phazaca leucocera =

Species of moth

Phazaca leucocera is a species of moth of the family Uraniidae. It is found in Sri Lanka, southern India, China, Borneo and the Solomon Islands.

== Description ==
Hindwings of male with two tufts of hair on the costa. Male has mark on inner margin of forewings filled with black, and a plum-colored center. The laden marginal band prominent and regular. Hindwings dark chocolate. The medial band plum-colored, bounded by white lines. The marginal band irregular. The tuft in the fold on inner margin pure white. Female with marginal band of both wings lunulate.
