= Pavel Argeyev =

Pavel Vladimirovich Argeyev
- Павел Владимирович Аргеев
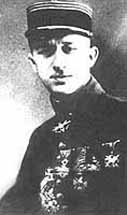
- Argeyev as a Capitaine of the Armée de l'Air
- Born: 1 March 1887; Yalta, Taurida Governorate, Russian Empire
- Died: 30 October 1922 (aged 35) near Trutnov, Czechoslovakia
- Military career
- Allegiance: Russian Empire; France
- Branch: Imperial Russian Army; French Foreign Legion; Armée de l'Air; IRAS
- Service years: 1909 – 1922
- Rank: Lieutenant Colonel (Russia); Captain (France)
- Nickname: The Eagle of Crimea
- Units: 184th Reserve Infantry Regiment; 29th Chernigov Infantry Regiment; Escadrille N.48; Escadrille SPA.124; 19th Corps Fighter Detachment
- Awards: Legion d'honneur; Croix de Guerre; Order of St. George; Order of St. Vladimir; Order of St. Anna

Capitaine Pavel Vladimirovich Argeyev (Russian: Па́вел Влади́мирович Арге́ев) (1 March 1887 – 30 October 1922), also known as Paul d'Argueev and The Eagle of Crimea, was a Russian-born flying ace of World War I, serving the French Armée de l'Air and Imperial Russian Air Service. Initially a high-ranking officer in the Imperial Russian Army, he transferred to France, where he became an aviator. He received a variety of decorations, both French and Russian, before dying in a flying accident in 1922.

== Early life ==
Born in Yalta, Crimea, in 1887 to an engineer of steamships named Vladimir Akimovich Argeyev and his wife, Argeyev graduated from the military academy in Odessa in 1907 and Odessa College in 1909 and joined the Imperial Russian Army as a sergeant in the 184th Reserve Infantry Regiment in Warsaw, Poland. He was promoted to lieutenant in 1912 and transferred to the 29th Chernigov Infantry Regiment, where he was made a lieutenant colonel.

== Move to France ==
In 1914, on the outbreak of World War I, Argeyev resigned his Russian commission (after refusing to carry out a punishment on a soldier that he considered undeserved) and moved to France, enlisting in the French Foreign Legion with the rank of lieutenant on 12 September 1914. As with many airmen, he chose first to enlist in the infantry. He was assigned to the 131st Infantry Regiment, and participated in the Battle of the Marne, in which he received a head injury but returned to the front in October. He was awarded the Croix de Guerre, followed by an appointment as a chevalier of the Legion d'honneur in May 1915. In the process of winning these honors, Argeyev was wounded thrice, on 23 September 1915, in April 1916, and again on 2 May 1916.

== Career as a pilot ==
In January 1916, having been ruled unfit for infantry service due to his injuries, Argeyev requested a transfer to the Armée de l'Air. After training at Pau, he was enlisted as a pilot on 30 January 1916. After having accumulated flying hours on the Western Front with Escadrille N48, he returned to Russia and was made a Captain of the Imperial Russian Air Service, assigned to the 12th Fighter Detachment on 20 October 1916.

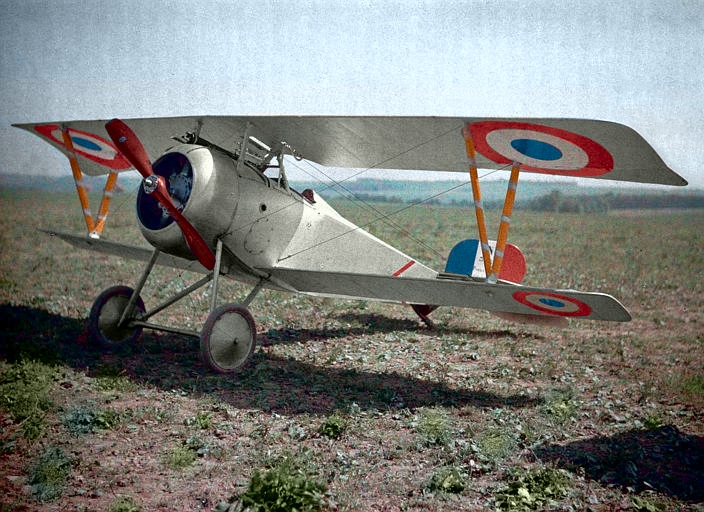
A Nieuport 17, as flown by Argeyev on the Eastern Front in 1917.

Argeyev's first victory came four months later, on the morning of 10 January 1917, when he downed an Albatros C.V. An uncredited victory came four months later, on the evening of 8 April, when he downed a Fokker near Mitau, in modern-day Latvia. His second official victory came at 9:45 am on 21 April, followed by his third on 6 May, which he shared with Ernst Leman and Alexander Kazakov. He downed a Hansa-Brandenburg C.I near Berezhany, Ukraine in his Nieuport 17. He then scored three more victories in three months - an LVG C.II at Jēkabpils on 17 May, another Hansa-Brandenburg C.I near Kozova on 8 June, and finally a Rumpler C.I on 20 June. Now he was a flying ace, having scored more than five victories.

== Return to France ==
In May 1918, as the Russian Revolution raged on, Argeyev returned to France due to the hostile attitudes of the Bolsheviks towards the Tsar's officer corps. Enlisting once more in the Armée de l'Air, he was assigned to Escadrille SPA.124, where he would spend the rest of the war.

His first victory came only days after joining the squadron, when he downed an LVG C.II on 1 June 1918. Now flying a SPAD XIII, within the few months he spent in the French air force, he considerably expanded his victory score.

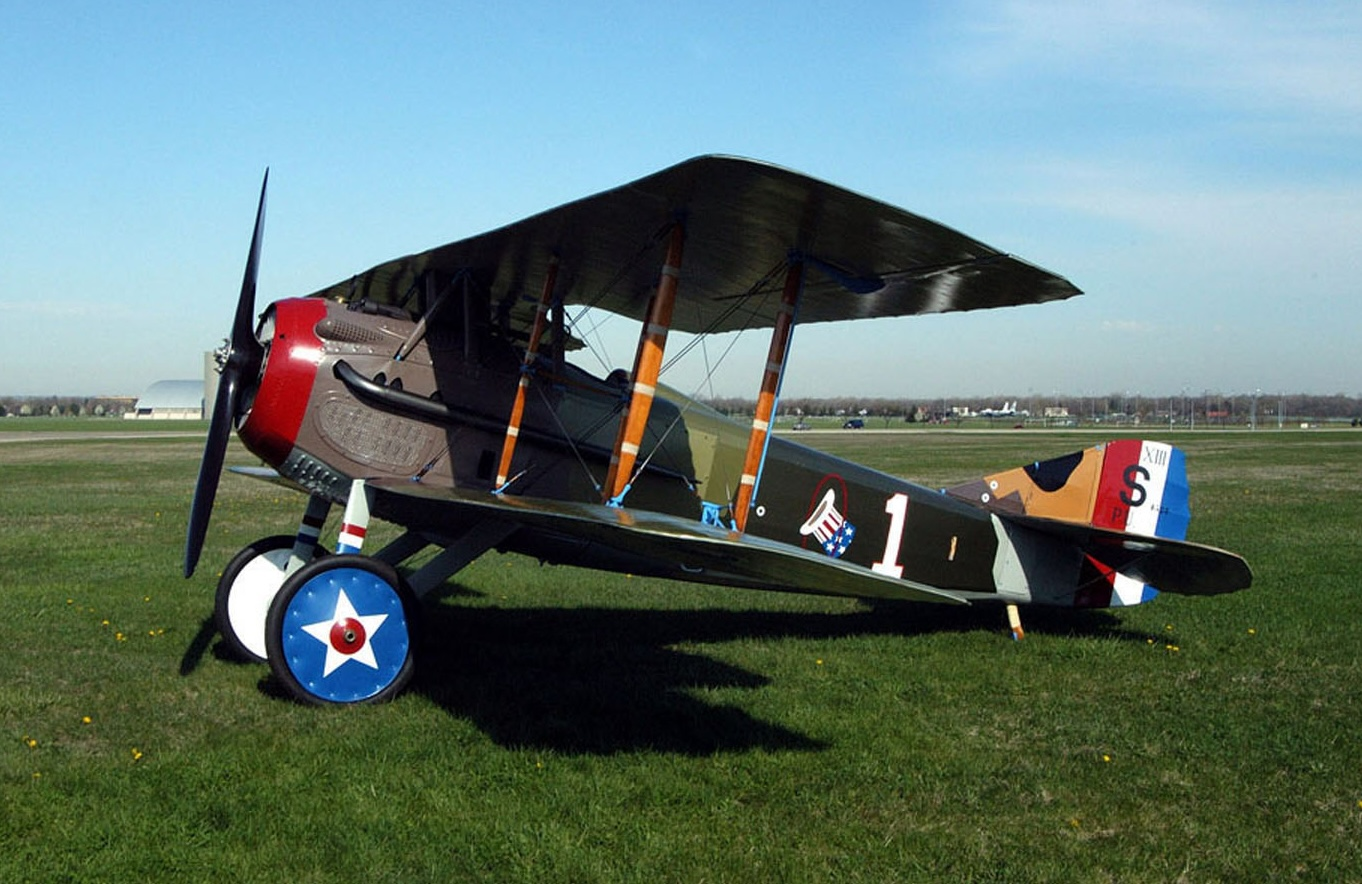
A SPAD XIII as flown by Argeyev in France in 1918.

Now sporting seven credited and one uncredited victory, he added two more on 14 and 15 June, when he downed, respectively, a Rumpler C.I and another two-seater aircraft on successive days. He scored his tenth victory on 26 June, another two-seater.

Despite downing no aircraft in July or August, in September 1918 he scored three victories, bringing his total to 13. Firstly, a Fokker D.VII north of Cerny on 27 September, followed by two kills the day after, two two-seater aircraft near Séchault at 10:10 am and 3:20 pm. He again scored a double victory on 5 October, albeit one of them uncredited - another two-seater north-east of Autry at 11:25 am. However, he scored a credited victory in downing a Pfalz D.III at Orfeuil at 6:25 pm.

His final victory of the war came on 30 October 1918, only 12 days before the end of the war. He scored a victory against a two-seater aircraft at 3:40 pm near Quatre-Champs. By the end of hostilities, he had scored fifteen credited victories and two uncredited victories, making him Russia's third highest-scoring flying ace after Alexander Kazakov and Vasili Yanchenko.

== Post-war and death ==
Reluctant to return to the USSR, he continued flying as a test pilot and was killed on 30 October 1922 near Trutnov, Czechoslovakia when his Potez aircraft crashed in the Sudetes mountains in thick fog.

== Honours and awards ==
- Officer of the Legion d'Honneur (France, 1915), previously awarded the Chevalier (1918)
- Croix de guerre 1914-1918 with 8 Palmes (France, 1915)
- Order of St. George, 4th Class with Swords (31 October 1917, for victories in aerial combat on 23 April 1917 and 5 April 1917)
- Order of St. Vladimir, 4th Class with Swords (18 December 1915, "for actions in the war against the Germans on the French front")
- Order of St. Anna, 2nd, 3rd and 4th classes
- Gold Sword for Bravery (21 November 1917, for the destruction of enemy aircraft 26 May 1917)

=== Legion d'honneur Citation ===
"A Russian national who took command of a company in November. Has shown by his actions great alacrity and the highest energy. He has complete authority over his men. He was lightly wounded on 17 April 1915, but retained command of his company."

== List of aerial victories ==
Confirmed victories are numbered and listed chronologically. Unconfirmed victories are denoted by "u/c" and may or may not be listed by date.

No.	Date/time	Aircraft	Foe	Result	Location	Notes
1	10 January 1917	Nieuport	Albatros reconnaissance craft			
u/c	Morning of 8 April 1917	Nieuport	Fokker		Jelgava, present day Latvia	
2	21 April 1917 past noon	Nieuport	Enemy two-seater			
3	6 May 1917 @ 0945 hours	Nieuport	Hansa-Brandenburg C.I		Berezhany	Victory shared with Alexander Kazakov, Ernst Leman, another pilot
4	17 May 1917	Nieuport	LVG two-seater		Jakobstadt, present day Latvia	Victory shared with Alexander Kazakov
5	8 June 1917	Nieuport	Hansa-Brandenburg C.I		Vicinity of Kozova, Ukraine	Victory shared with Alexander Kazakov
6	20 June 1917	Nieuport	Rumpler reconnaissance craft		Vicinity of Nejnokov	Victory shared with Alexander Kazakov
7	1 June 1918	Spad XIII	LVG two-seater		Between Puisieux and Beaumont, France	
8	13 June 1918	Spad XIII	Rumpler two-seater			
9	14 June 1918	Spad XIII	Enemy two-seter			
10	26 June 1918	Spad XIII	Enemy two-seater			
11	27 September 1918	Spad XIII	Fokker D.VII		North of Cerny, France	
12	28 September 1918 @ 1010 hours	Spad XIII	Enemy two-seater		Séchault, France	
13	28 September 1918 @ 1520 hours	Spad XIII	Enemy two-seater		Between Séchault and Laval	
u/c	5 October 1918 @ 1125 hours	Spad XIII	Enemy two-seater		Northeast of Autry	
14	5 October 1918 @ 1815 hours	Spad XIII	Pfalz fighter		Orfeuil	
15	30 October 1918 @ 1540 hours	Spad XIII	Enemy two-seater		East of Quatre-Champs, France	

== See also ==
- List of World War I flying aces
- Aerial victory standards of World War I
