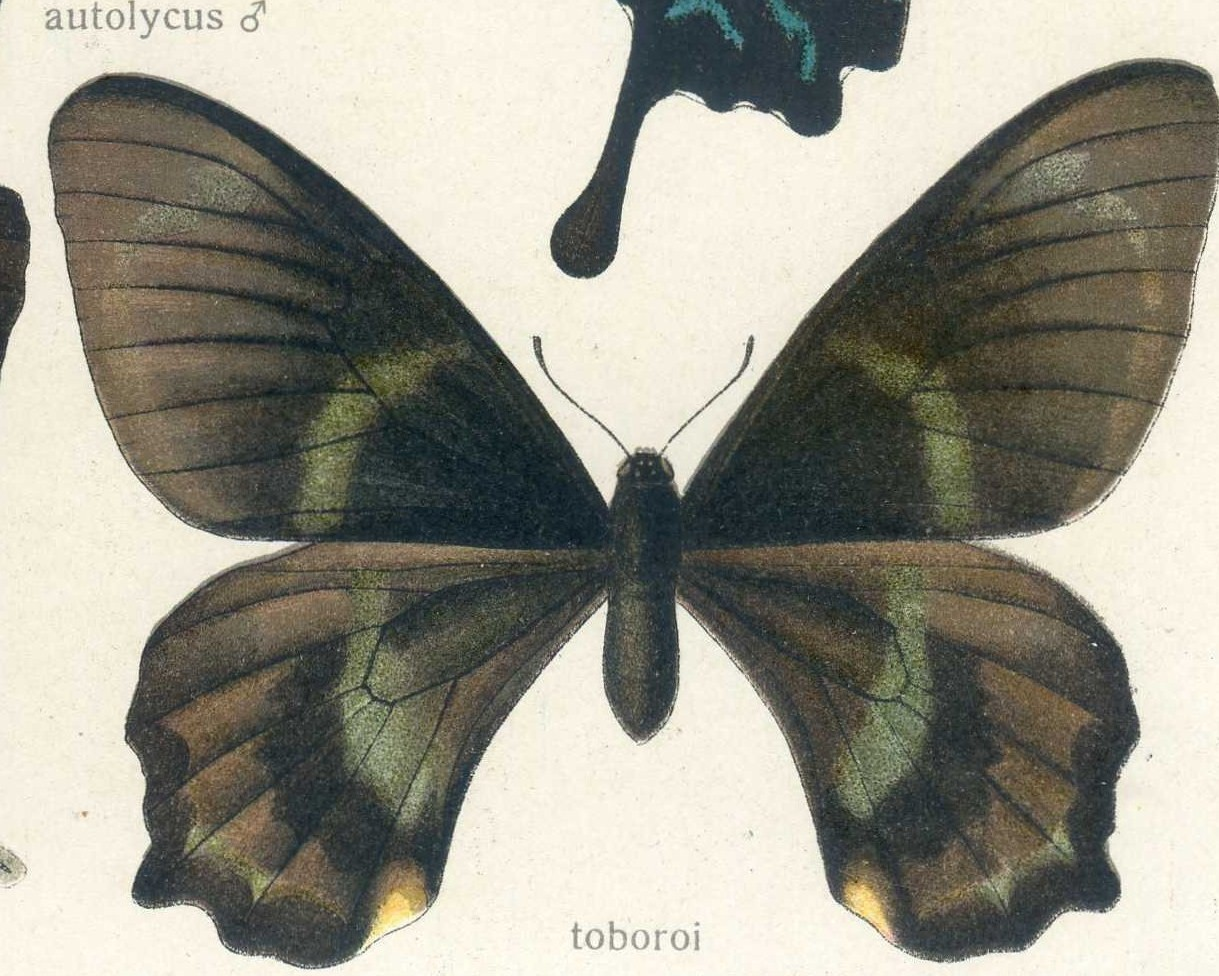

Conservation status
- Least Concern (IUCN 3.1)

Scientific classification
- Kingdom: Animalia
- Phylum: Arthropoda
- Clade: Pancrustacea
- Class: Insecta
- Order: Lepidoptera
- Family: Papilionidae
- Genus: Papilio
- Species: P. toboroi

Binomial name
- Papilio toboroi Ribbe, 1907

= Papilio toboroi =

Species of butterfly

Papilio toboroi is a species of butterfly in the family Papilionidae. It is found in Papua New Guinea and the Solomon Islands.

== Description ==
P. toboroi Ribbe (38 c). Whilst in laglaizei almost the whole upper surface of the body and also the sides of the abdomen are blue-grey, toboroi has an entirely black body without any markings. Upper surface of the wings dark blue, with a slight oily gloss; the median band of both wings narrow, the part placed in the cell of the forewing is commonly diffuse and is always at a distance from the apex of the cell; on the hindwing a pale yellow anal spot, the tail entirely black-blue. The under surface in contrast to laglaizei for the most part black; in the forewing a submarginal band, which is anteriorly broad and greyish yellow, posteriorly narrow and bluish, and before the middle a more or less indistinct narrow blue band; on the hindwing a large basal area and a broad submarginal band are grey-yellow, and the black central area is more or less broken up into large patches, the orange-coloured spot before the hindmargin paler than in laglaizei. The female as in laglaizei quite similar to the male; on the upper surface of the hindwing it has from the 3. radial backwards an irregular narrow grey-blue submarginal band, which in the male is only indicated. — Bougainville, Solomon Islands; in the interior of the island, a few miles from the coast, the butterfly is rather common in low situations. An Alcidis similar to toboroi does not appear to occur on Bougainville, on the other hand Meek sent a series of a species of Dysphania which, in spite of its smaller size, bears quite the same aspect as the Papilio. toboroi differs from laglaizei in neuration and in the genitalia as well as in the markings.
