= 124 Squadron =

124 Squadron may refer to:

- No. 124 Squadron RCAF, see list of Royal Canadian Air Force squadrons
- 124 Squadron (Israel)
- 124 Squadron, Republic of Singapore Air Force, see list of Republic of Singapore Air Force squadrons
- No. 124 Squadron RAF, United Kingdom
- 124th Aero Squadron, Air Service, United States Army
- 124th Attack Squadron, United States Air Force
- VAW-124, United States Navy
- VF-124, United States Navy
- VF-124 (1950-8), United States Navy
- VMFA-124, United States Marine Corps

== See also ==
- Escadrille 124 (disambiguation)
