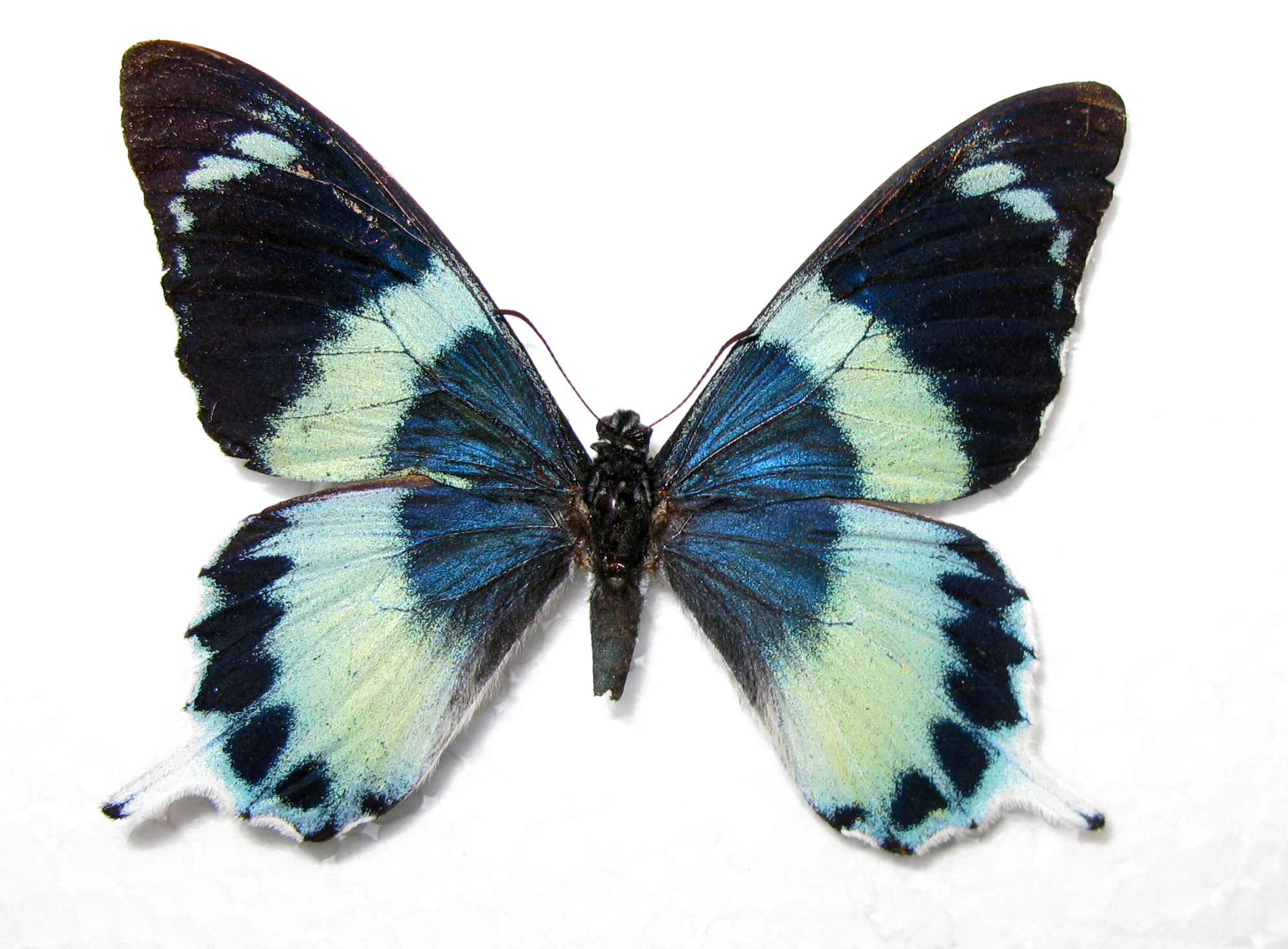

Scientific classification
- Kingdom: Animalia
- Phylum: Arthropoda
- Clade: Pancrustacea
- Class: Insecta
- Order: Lepidoptera
- Family: Papilionidae
- Genus: Papilio
- Species: P. laglaizei

Binomial name
- Papilio laglaizei Depuiset, 1877

= Papilio laglaizei =

Species of butterfly

Papilio laglaizei is a swallowtail butterfly found in New Guinea. It is a mimic of Alcides agathyrsus. The larvae feed on Litsea.

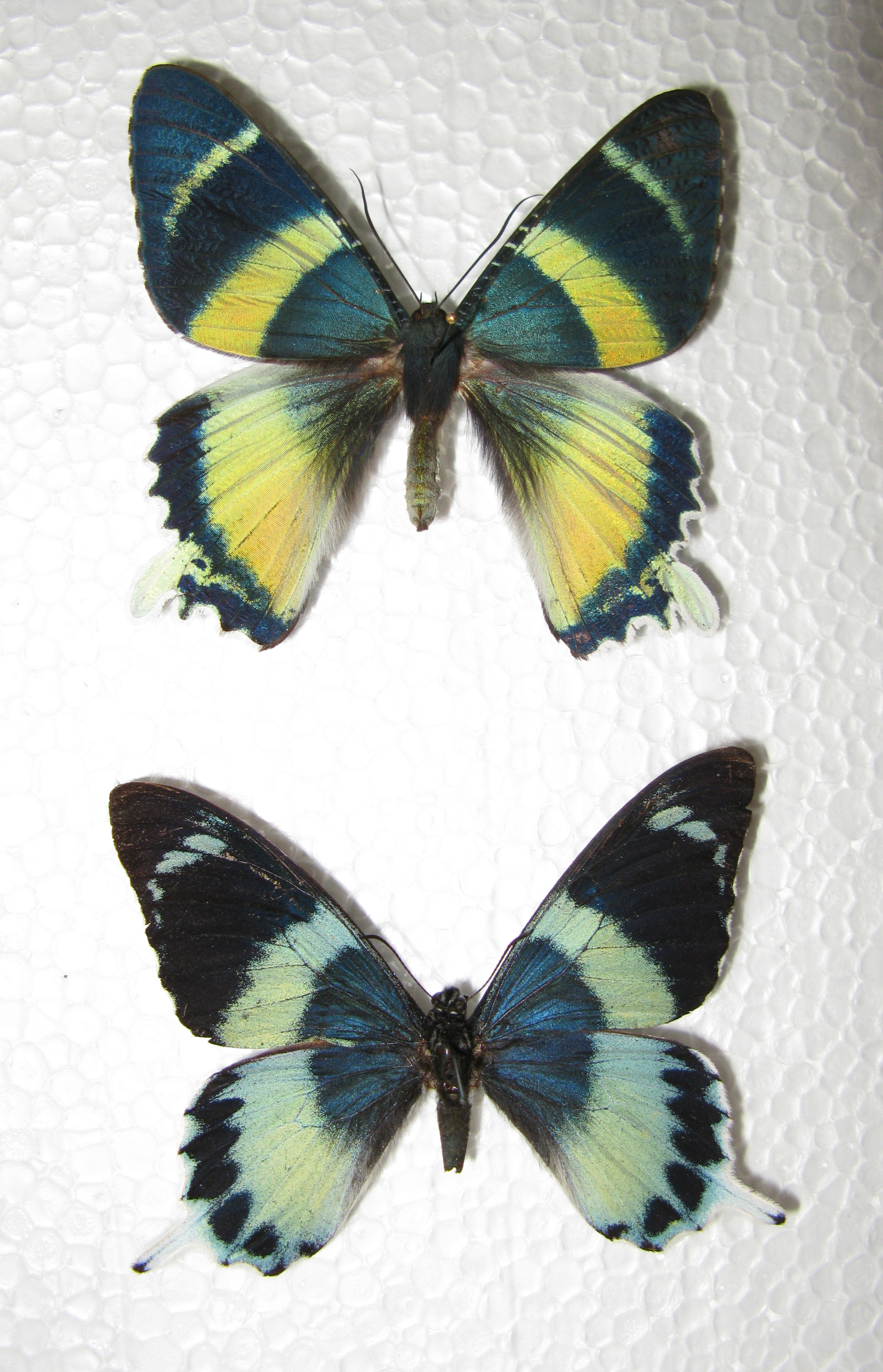
Alcidis agathyrsus, top and Papilio laglaizei

== Description ==
In both male and female the median band of both wings is broad, the tail and usually also the adjoining part of the distal margin is grey-blue.The under surface is for the most part blue-grey, the hindwing in fresh specimens bluish grey with a faint yellowish tone.The individual markings are very variable for instance the black spots on the disc of the hindwing beneath often much enlarged and the proximal patches confluent with the corresponding distal ones.

A male from Astrolabe Bay with narrow blue instead of blue-grey median band and blue under surface was described by Rober as a distinct species. Jordan considered this ab. wahnesi Rob.

The resemblance to Alcidis agathyrsus is surprisingly faithful on the upper surface; the under surface differs considerably from that of the model, but bears a usually very conspicuous orange spot which corresponds to the orange-coloured underside of the abdomen of Alcidis. The two butterflies fly together round the tops of trees, but the Uranid is much commoner than the Papilio.

The larva is black with broad yellowish red rings sharing light yellow dots with the black belts'At each side of the dorsum there is a row of short black spines, which are placed on large round black dots, at the dorsal side of which is a yellow dot; the last segment for the most part black; head black; scent-fork ( inflated specimens cabinet specimens) yellowish grey.
