= Albert-Léon Lebarque =

French sculptor

- Born: 18 November 1853; Quatre-Champs, France
- Died: 11 January 1939 (aged 85)
- Occupations: Sculptor, painter, medalist

Albert-Léon Lebarque (18 November 1853 – 11 January 1939) was a French sculptor, painter and medalist. He was most known for his painted ceramics.

Lebarque was a student of Eugène Carrière. He lived in Aulnay-sous-Bois.

Between 1880 and 1920 he exhibited at the Salon des Artistes Français.

He was a honored medalist by the Société des Artistes Français in 1914 and 1920.

His work was part of the sculpture event in the art competition at the 1928 Summer Olympics.
