= Ernst Leman =

Ernst Krislanovich Leman
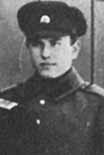
- Born: 1894; Liepāja, Russian Empire
- Died: A few days later than 17 December 1917; A military hospital
- Military career
- Allegiance: Russian Empire
- Branch: Imperial Russian Air Service
- Rank: Praporshik
- Unit: 19th Corps Fighter Detachment
- Conflicts: World War I
- Awards: Order of St. George; Cross of St. George; Order of St. Stanislaus; Order of St. Anna

Ensign Ernst Krislanovich Leman (1894–1917) was a Russian World War I flying ace credited with five aerial victories.

== Biography ==
Ernst Krislanovich Leman was born in 1894 to a middle class Lutheran family in Latvia. Leman enlisted as a Private on 14 November 1914. He was sent to Odessa for aviation training. By Spring 1915, he had become a flight cadet. Eventually, he was graduated as a pilot on 29 June 1916; he was rated as a Podpraporshchik. On 29 July 1916, he was posted to the 19th Corps Fighter Detachment near Lutsk.

On 22 August 1916, Leman chased off an enemy plane acting as artillery spotter. His feat was noted in the daily official army communique. It was the start of a series of valorous feats that resulted in the award of the Order of Saint George Fourth Class on 9 January 1917.

Leman's unit then was transferred to the Kingdom of Romania. By late February, it was based near Stanislav, Romania. Though still unsuccessful, he was in frequent combat. In late April he was appointed as a Praporshik. He scored his first victory on 4 May 1917. He was awarded the Order of Saint Anna Fourth Class after his third victory, and the Order of Saint Stanilas Third Class with Swords and Bow after his fourth. While scoring his fifth victory on 26 September, he was severely wounded and was hospitalized. He married his nurse, Lydia Vilensky, while convalescing. Kazakov recommended Leman for the Order of Saint George; the Fourth Class award was made on 13 November 1917. On 22 November, Leman was discharged to return to duty, though he was too weak to fly.

On 17 December 1917, Leman was shot in the head. His wife sat by him in hospital until he died several days later.

At the time of Leman's death, it was known that the Soldier's Councils of the Russian Revolution were calling for the murder of military officers. For instance, in the same unit, Ivan Smirnov was marked for murder by the Bolsheviks. It is unknown whether Ernst Leman was murdered or committed suicide.

== List of aerial victories ==
See also Aerial victory standards of World War I, List of World War I flying aces from the Russian Empire

Confirmed victories are numbered and listed chronologically.

No.	Date/time	Aircraft	Foe	Result	Location	Notes
1	6 May 1917 @ 0940 hours	Nieuport 17	Hansa-Brandenburg C.I serial no. 26.51	Crashed on fire; air crew captured	Shebalin	Victory shared with Alexander Kazakov, Pavel Argeyev, and another Russian pilot
2	10 May 1917	Nieuport	Fokker monoplane	Crashlanded	Sarniki	Victory shared with Alexander Kazakov
3	27 June 1917 @ 2100 hours	Nieuport 17	Rumpler C.I	Aircraft and crew captured after crashlanding	Nizhnev	Victory shared with Alexander Kazakov
4	16 August 1917	Nieuport	Enemy aircraft			Victory shared with Ivan Smirnov
5	26 September 1917	Nieuport	Enemy two-seater		Vicinity of Gusiatina	Shared victory

== Honors and awards ==
- Cross of St. George, 4th class: January 1917
- Order of St. Anna, 4th class: ca July 1917
- Order of St. Stanislaus, 3rd Class with Swords and Bow: 20 September 1917
- Order of Saint George Fourth Class: 13 November 1917
