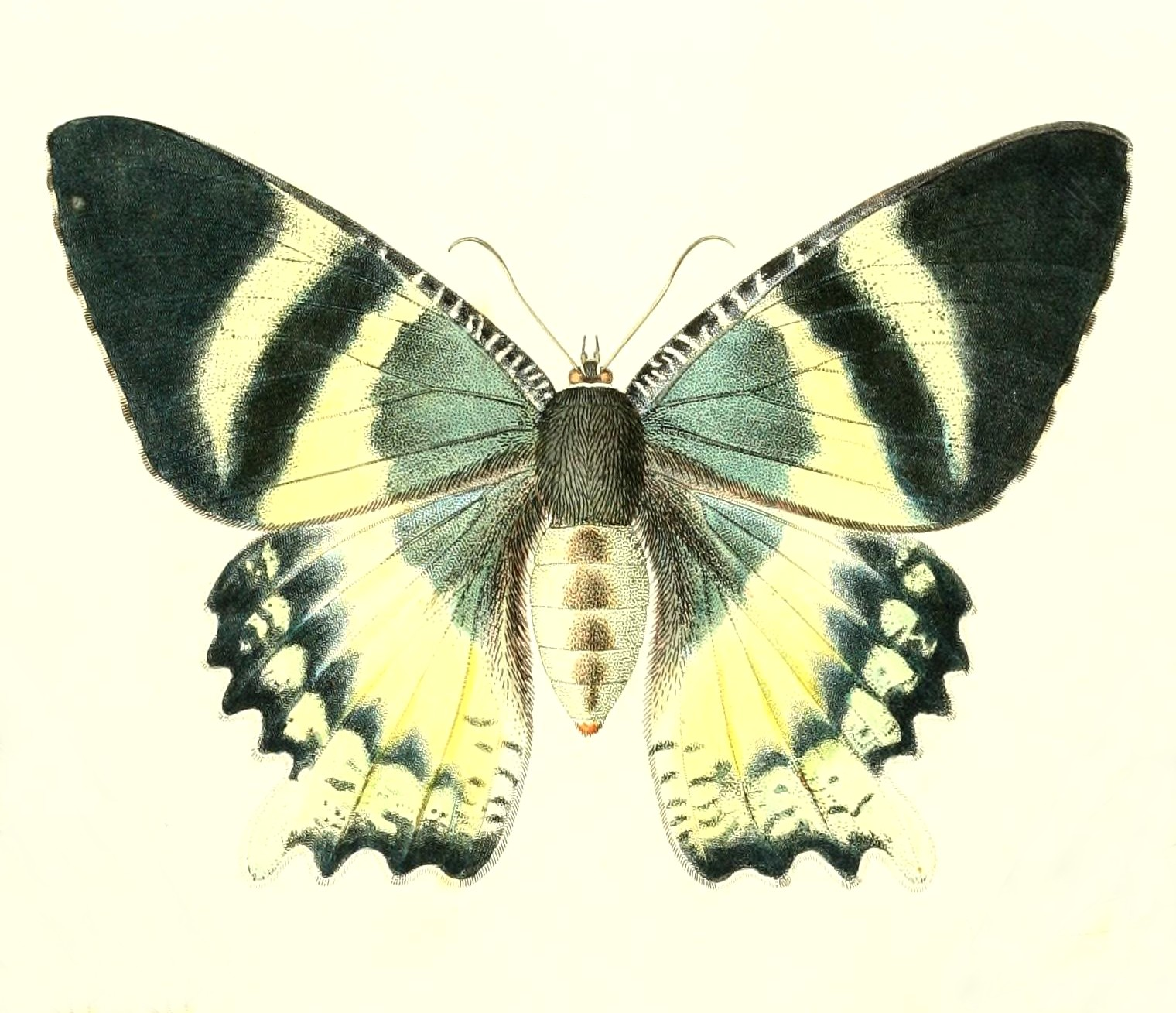

Scientific classification
- Kingdom: Animalia
- Phylum: Arthropoda
- Class: Insecta
- Order: Lepidoptera
- Family: Uraniidae
- Genus: Alcides
- Species: A. orontes

Binomial name
- Alcides orontes (Linnaeus, 1763)

Synonyms
- Papilio orontes Linnaeus, 1763; Alcides orontiaria Hübner, [1822]

= Alcides orontes =

Species of moth

Alcides orontes is a moth of the family Uraniidae. It is known from the Maluku Islands, including Seram Island and Ambon Island.
