= Ivan Smirnov (aviator) =

Russian flying ace (1895–1956)

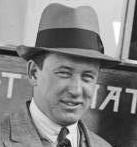
- Ivan Smirnov after his military service, in his middle years.
- Born: Ivan Vasilyevich Smirnov; 30 January 1895; Near Vladimir, Russian Empire
- Died: 28 October 1956 (aged 61); Mallorca, Spain
- Military career
- Allegiance: Russian Empire; Netherlands
- Branch: Imperial Russian Air Service; Royal Air Force; U.S. Army Air Forces
- Service years: 1914-1917; 1919; 1942-1945
- Rank: Captain
- Nicknames: "Earl of the Goodwins", "The Turk", "Iwan de Verschrikkelijke"
- Unit: 19th Corps Aviation Detachment
- Conflicts: World War I World War II
- Awards: Cross of St. George (all four classes), Order of St. Anna, 4th and 3rd classes, Order of St. Stanislaus, 3rd class with swords, Gold Sword for Bravery, Order of St. Vladimir, 4th class with swords, Serbian Order of the White Eagle, French Croix de Guerre, Dutch Airman's Cross; Dutch Knight of the Order of Orange-Nassau
- Other work: 25 years with KLM; service in World War II

Ivan Vasilyevich Smirnov, or Iwan Smirnoff (Russian: Ива́н Васи́льевич Смирно́в; 30 January 1895 – 28 October 1956), was a Russian World War I flying ace and naturalized Dutch aviator who pioneered the Europe to South East Asia routes. He was born to a poor peasant family, and later became an officer in the Imperial Russian Air Service. After surviving infantry combat, he trained as a pilot, and was subsequently credited with 11 aerial victories during World War I. When the October Revolution ended his participation in the war, he deserted and became an itinerant pilot. He served short spells in the Royal Air Force, the Volunteer Army of Anton Denikin, Handley Page and SNETA. The Russian emigrant subsequently piloted for KLM for the next 25 years, pioneering air routes to the Dutch East Indies in the process. In December 1941, Smirnov returned to military flying during the frenzied air evacuation of Dutch nationals. After the Dutch East Indies were overrun by the Japanese, he joined the U.S. Air Transport Command. He served through the war's end and returned to KLM.

== Early life and World War I infantry service ==
Ivan Vasilyevich Smirnov was born on 30 January 1895. He was the fourth child born into a peasant family whose farm was near Vladimir. He received little schooling; his family existed in a state of near-serfdom. The peasantry to which he belonged could not even work in a local factory without continuing to farm the community's land. It was a situation with little chance for improving one's life.

At the outbreak of World War I Smirnov enrolled as a volunteer in the 96th Omsk Infantry Regiment. After a short spell of training, the unit went into ferocious combat in the Battle of Łódź; the barely-trained regiment suffered severe casualties both from its well-schooled German foe and from the foul weather. Concerning this period, Smirnov later remarked, "We were thrown in as mere gun fodder...." He also noted that his contingent of 90 soldiers was rapidly reduced to 19 by casualties.

In late October, Ivan Smirnov carried out a series of hazardous ground reconnaissance patrols. For this, he was recommended for the Fourth Class Cross of St. George on 24 October 1914. Shortly thereafter, he was the final man standing out of the original 90 recruits.

He was seriously wounded in the leg by machine gun fire on 8 December 1914 and was medically evacuated on a hospital train to Petrograd. He would be laid up five months. During that time, he became interested in flying. As it happened, his nurse's father was a general on the staff of Grand Duke Michael, who was the Inspector-general of the Imperial Russian Air Service; the nurse's father had sufficient influence to arrange Smirnov's transition to aviation.

After healing in hospital, he was sent home on a month's convalescent leave. While on this leave, he sent an official appeal to Grand Duke Michael; in it Smirnov requested a transfer to aviation. It was granted, and he reported to pilot's training in Petrograd on 21 August 1915.

== World War I aviation service ==
Smirnov trained for 18 days at Petrograd, progressing to flying 3.5 hours dual instruction with an instructor on a Caudron trainer. He was then shifted to the flying school in Moscow. He arrived there on 25 October 1915, to begin mastery of the Farman IV biplane. He soloed on the Farman, and was first in his class to graduate the primary course and begin advanced training.

As the IRAS revamped its structure in 1916, Smirnov received advanced instruction on Morane-Saulnier G and Moska MBbis aircraft to fit him for flying fighters in the new fighter squadrons being formed. On 10 September 1916, Efreitor Smirnov qualified as a military pilot, on a Morane-Saulnier L.

He was then assigned to the elite 19th Korpusnoi Aviatsionniy Otrad (19th Corps Aviation Detachment) at Lutsk. When he reported in on 20 September 1916, he was cordially greeted by his new commander, Alexander Kazakov. As the newest pilot, Smirnov was assigned a two-seater Nieuport 10, as more experienced pilots had first call on the unit's single-seater fighters. Undeterred by his inferior aircraft; as early as 1 October, he was already in combat. However, worsening autumn weather slowed the unit's operational tempo for the winter. Smirnov would not score his first victory until 2 January 1917, when he and his observer downed an enemy machine with rifle fire.

While this was occurring, the 19th KAO was ensnarled in its logistical move to Galicia. Differing railway gauges and incompetent staff logistic work delayed the fighter unit's arrival at its new base until 6 April 1917. As a result, Smirnov did not fly combat again until 18 April, when he closed within 50 meters firing range of an enemy plane, but failed to down it. On 27 April, he won the Third Class Cross of Saint George, in an action whose details do not survive. Ivan Smirnov would not score his second confirmed victory until 2 May 1917. He was granted the Second Class Cross of Saint George for this feat.

His initial victory brought the young corporal a recommendation for commissioning. While the recommendation was in progress, he was promoted to Starshyi Unter-Officer (Sergeant). On 13 May 1917, the appointment as Praporshchik came through on Order 506 of the Southwest Front armies. Five days later, he fought an inconclusive battle with an enemy aircraft over Bolshovtse; there were no witnesses to the enemy's forced landing, and Smirnov's machine was badly damaged in the encounter.

On 3 June, Smirnov was recommended for the official title of Military Pilot and rewarded with a month's leave. After his return, on 5 July, Smirnov moved up to a newer machine, Nieuport 17 serial number N2522. The 19th would move again a few days later. Smirnov continued to fly combat, and to fight, but with no further success until August, when he was promoted to Ensign.

In August 1917, Smirnov racked up more flight time than anyone else in the 19th, clocking 56 hours air time in 27 sorties. On the 23rd, he fought six times, and was credited with his third aerial victory. This began a victory run that extended through his 11th victory, on 26 November 1917. Intermixed with these successes, Smirnov flew escort missions for the huge Sikorsky Ilya Muromets bombers on both 2 and 12 September, but encountered no opposition.

=== List of aerial victories ===
Confirmed victories are numbered and listed chronologically.

No.	Date/time	Aircraft	Foe	Result	Location	Notes
1	2 January 1917 ca 1130 hours	Nieuport 10 serial nr N722	Aviatik C.I s/n C2775/16	Aviatik destroyed; air crew KIA	Lutsk, present day Ukraine	Observer: Captain Pentko
2	2 May 1917	Morane-Saulnier I	Albatros C Class two-seater	Air crew burned Albatros after forced landing	Gorozhanki	Loss from Feldflieger Abteilung 220
u/c	18 May 1917		Enemy aircraft	Steep dive into a forced landing	Bolshovtse	
3	16 August 1917	Nieuport 17	Enemy aircraft		Melnitsy	
4	23 August 1917	Nieuport 17	Enemy two-seater	Crashlanded, overturned, damaged	Husiatyn, pd Ukraine	Shared victory
5	8 September 1917	Morane-Saulnier I	Enemy two-seater		Husiatyn	
6	25 September 1917	Spad VII s/n S1546	Enemy two-seater Albatros C.X	Captured	Between Balin and Prilip	Loss from Fliegerkompanie 24
7	24 October 1917	Spad VII s/n S1546	Enemy fighter		Kovel, pd Ukraine	
8	10 November 1917	Spad VII s/n S1546	Hansa-Brandenburg C.I s/n 269.08	Set afire	South of Zielona, pd Poland	Loss from Fliegerkompanie 9
9	10 November 1917	Spad VII s/n S1546	Hansa-Brandenburg C.I	Overturned upon landing; destroyed by Russian artillery	Zelyonaya	Victory shared; loss from Fliegerkompanie 9
10	23 November 1917	Spad VII s/n S1546	Lloyd C.V s/n 46.22	Destroyed; air crew killed	Letovo	Loss from Fliegerkompanie 18
11	26 November 1917 at 1300 hours	Spad VII s/n S1546	Enemy aircraft		Near Skalat, p.d. Ukraine	Victory shared with Alexander Kazakov

== Defection ==
The political turmoil of the October Revolution now affected the unit, with the local Revolutionary Military Committee usurping command in December 1917. The incoming Bolshevik regime declared a ceasefire on 7 November 1917, though Smirnov continued to fly. Soldiers Committees began to take power in the Russian military; they condoned the murder of their officers. Smirnov's last victory had brought him a congratulatory telegram from General Vyatcheslav Tkachev; that brought the attention of Bolshevik enlisted men in his unit. On 18 December 1917, the IRAS was grounded. Fearing Bolshevist persecution because they were officers, Smirnov and two other pilots deserted on the 27th. They commandeered an automobile to take them to Kamianets-Podilskyi. The three deserters secretively boarded a train to continue their escape. They spent a hazardous month dodging Soviet authorities while transiting Russia. They reached Vladivostok before the incoming Bolsheviks could arrive to assume control. Smirnov and his friends made the rounds of foreign consulates, being refused help by both the Americans and the French. However, the British were amenable to their joining the Royal Flying Corps in England. A friend supplied Smirnov with someone else's Russian passport to travel upon. Smirnov and his friend Lipsky set out on a nine-month voyage to the British Isles. Their journey took them through the ports of Hong Kong, Shanghai, Saigon, and Singapore; they had to escape confinement in a prisoner of war camp in the latter. After further stops in Yangon, Colombo, and Aden, they came ashore in Suez and caught on as pilots with a British Airco DH.9 squadron for a while.

When they left the squadron, they transited Port Said and Alexandria, Egypt. They finally landed in England at Plymouth. Through the intercession of Air Vice-Marshal Sefton Brancker, they were retrained at the Central Flying School at Upavon on Bristol F.2 Fighters, Avro 504Ks, and Royal Aircraft Factory SE.5as. However, the end of World War I saw Smirnov demobilized from the Royal Air Force.

== Civilian pilot of KLM ==
When he was demobilized, Smirnov snagged a flight instructor's job through a Russian officers' emigre association. The ace taught Russian pilots to fly Sopwith Camels, Airco DH.9s, Sopwith Snipes, and Bristol F.2 Fighters at RAF Netheravon. The flying school closed after a few months. Smirnov then took ship again, joining a group of other Russian pilots bound for Novorossiysk to join the Volunteer Army of the White Russian counter-revolutionists. When Smirnov arrived in August 1919, he was met by his old friend Lipsky. The latter advised Smirnov that the Volunteer Army was disintegrating from defeat, and that he should flee the coming disaster. Smirnov stowed away on an outbound ship the next morning. He ended up in Paris, where he became the assistant Air Attaché and Chief Pilot for the Russian royalist government in exile.

After the new Communist government gained control in Russia, Smirnov returned to work in the Handley Page factory. Following this, he returned to piloting, joining the pioneering Belgian airline SNETA in 1920. He carried passengers in SPADs and Airco DH.9s until in September 1921 a hangar fire consumed his assigned aircraft, leaving him jobless. He moved on to the Netherlands, and began flying for KLM in 1922. On 19 October 1923, he departed Schiphol in a Fokker F.III loaded with three passengers. Engine failure brought them down on the Goodwin Sands of the English Channel, necessitating a rescue by the collier Primo before incoming tides submerged the aircraft. Smirnov was consequently nicknamed "Earl of the Goodwins".

In September 1928, Smirnov pioneered the postal route from Amsterdam to Batavia, Dutch East Indies for KLM, an 18,000-mile round trip. The first flight to Java, scheduled to take 12 days of daylight flying, took 16 days including stops and accidents. Five years later, between 18 and 22 December 1933, he and his crew (Piet Soer, J.M.H. Grosfeld and C.H. van Beukering) set a record time of 100 hours and 35 minutes on this route, flying a Fokker F.XVIII dubbed Pelikaan ("Pelican"). On the return flight (27–30 December), they bested this time by 10 minutes despite bad weather conditions. 22,000 people welcomed them back at Schiphol to celebrate their return. In 1940, Smirnov was permanently posted in Indonesia by KLM.

== World War II ==
At the time of the German invasion of the Netherlands in May 1940, Smirnov and his wife lived in Napels, which since the outbreak of World War II had functioned as the terminal of the KLM route to the East Indies. He moved to Java and continued flying the route, until the Japanese invasion of the Dutch East Indies in December 1941. Though returned to military flying as a (reserve) captain in the army aviation corps, he remained also active as a civilian pilot. He evacuated Dutch women, children, and VIPs to Australia, at times taking off just minutes before the invaders arrived. Eventually, on 3 March 1942, his luck ran out. He was flying PK-AFV, a DC-3 Dakota again dubbed Pelikaan, when he was attacked by three Japanese Zeroes. Although wounded five times in the arm, the ex-fighter pilot threw his transport into a diving spiral away from the attacking fighters to make his escape. He crashlanded the DC-3 on a sandy beach, four of his passengers dying in the event. The survivors and cargo were rescued five days later, though a packet of diamonds, worth an estimated A£ 150,000 – 300,000 at the time, went missing. (For more details, see 1942 KNILM Douglas DC-3 shootdown)

After recovery from his injuries, Smirnov worked as a captain in the US 317th Troop Carrier Group despite attempts to ground him because of his age and chronic injuries. He would serve through war's end, and return to his civil job with KLM. His Second World War exploits brought him the Dutch Distinguished Flying Cross, the French Croix de Guerre, and installation as Knight of the Order of Orange Nassau from the Netherlands.

== After the war ==
Back in The Netherlands, Smirnov took up old activities and began to fly on his beloved Java route again. But in 1948 Smirnov got an offer he could not resist. He was asked to pilot a World Tour. The American Atlas Supply Company, a subsidiary of the Standard Oil Company of New Jersey, was planning a 100-day round-the-world flight on which heads of important American firms would act as their own commercial travellers. The plane in which they flew would be a travelling stockroom, loaded with colour films, scale models, give-away samples and literature in many languages. The Sky Merchant, a Douglas DC4, was to travel a route of 80.000 kilometres, crossing the equator six times, visiting all five continents, twenty-eight countries and forty-five principal cities. Smirnov was delighted.

Postwar, Smirnov was eventually grounded for medical reasons after 30,000+ flying hours, but remained with KLM as a senior advisor until his retirement in August 1949.

== Personal life ==
After moving to the Netherlands in 1921 Smirnov lived in Amsterdam. In October 1925 he married the Danish actress Margot Linnet, whom he had met in June of that year in Copenhagen. In 1929, he became a naturalized Dutch citizen with the name Iwan Wasiliwitsj Smirnoff, a spelling he always used himself. He moved to Heemstede in 1936, where he named his house De Pelikaan after the airplane of his record flight. After Margot's death from cancer in July 1947 he married the American heiress Mina (Niki) Redwood in September 1948 in New York. He did not have children in either marriage. In November 1952 Mina and Ivan moved from Heemstede to Cala d'Or on the Balearic island of Mallorca. He died in Palma on 28 October 1956 and was buried on the island. However, on 20 November 1959, he was reinterred in Heemstede.

== Honours and awards ==
- Cross of St. George, 2nd and 4th class and Saint George Sword (Russia)
- Order of St. Anna, 4th and 3rd classes (Russia)
- Order of St. Stanislaus, 3rd class with swords (Russia)
- Order of St. Vladimir, 4th class with swords (Russia)
- Order of the White Eagle (Serbia)
- Croix de Guerre (France)
- Knight of the Order of Orange-Nassau (Netherlands)
- Airman's Cross (Netherlands)

== Bibliography ==
- Smirnoff, Iwan W. Smirnoff vertelt, Andries Blitz Publishers, Amsterdam, 1938
- Smirnoff, Iwan W. De toekomst heeft vleugels, Elsevier, Amsterdam, 1947

== Bibliography ==
- Kulikov, Victor (November 1999). "Vivre pour voler: Ivan Smirnov" [Live to Fly: Ivan Smirnov]. Avions: Toute l'Aéronautique et Son Histoire (in French) (80): 50–57. ISSN 1243-8650.

Ivan meets Margot Linnet
