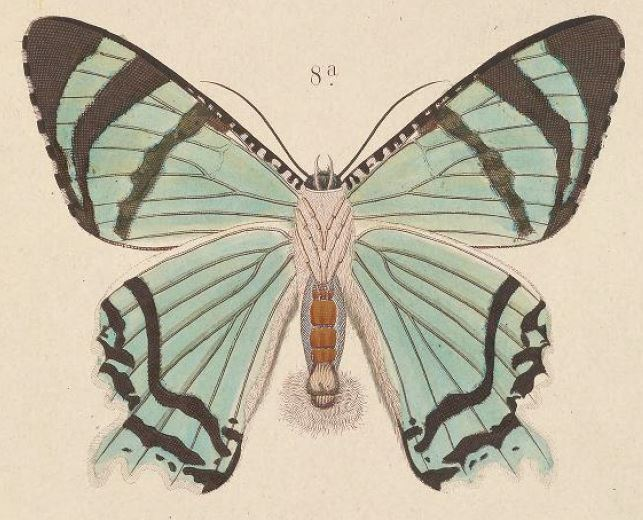
- ventral surface

Scientific classification
- Domain: Eukaryota
- Kingdom: Animalia
- Phylum: Arthropoda
- Class: Insecta
- Order: Lepidoptera
- Family: Uraniidae
- Genus: Alcides
- Species: A. agathyrsus

Binomial name
- Alcides agathyrsus (Kirsch, 1877)

Synonyms
- Nyctalemon agathyrsus Kirsch, 1877

= Alcides agathyrsus =

Species of moth

Alcides agathyrsus is a species of poisonous day-flying moth of the family Uraniidae. It is found from Indonesia to New Guinea. The butterfly Papilio laglaizei is a Batesian mimic of this moth.

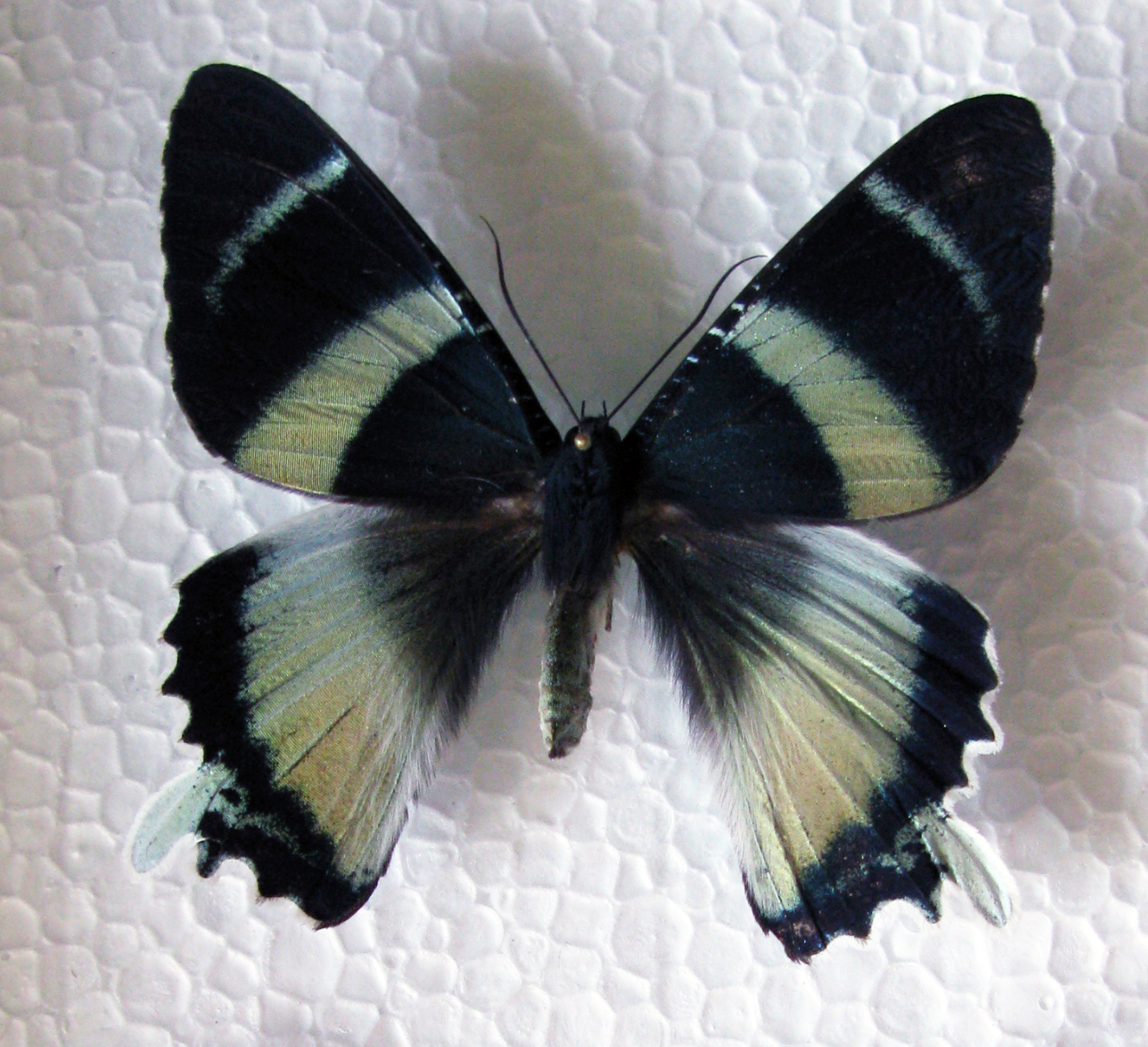
dorsal surface
