= Autry =

- Commune
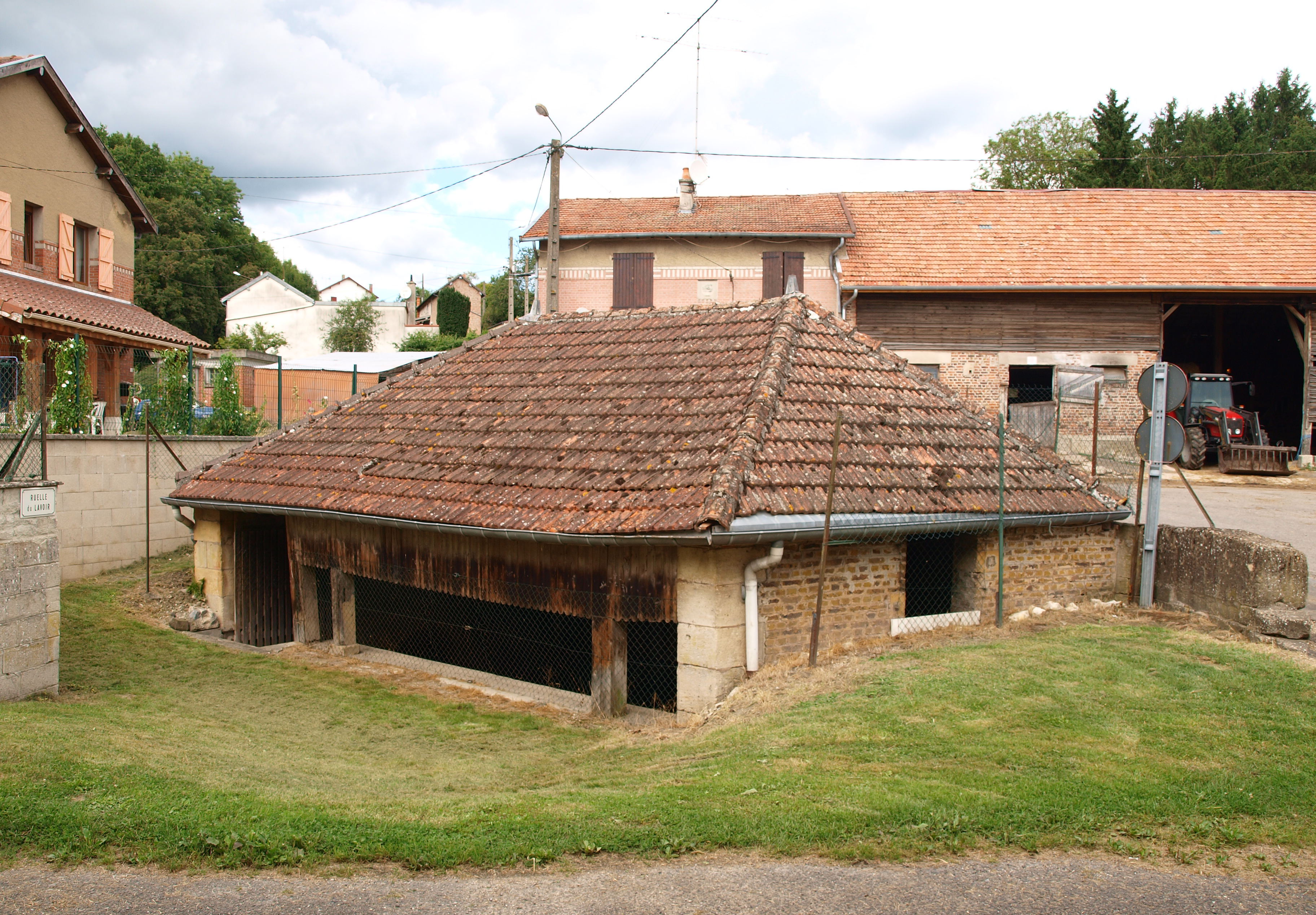
- The Lavoir (Public laundry) in Autry

- Coat of arms
- Location of Autry
- Location within France Location within Grand Est
- Coordinates: 49°16′09″N 4°50′16″E
- Country: France
- Region: Grand Est
- Department: Ardennes
- Arrondissement: Vouziers
- Canton: Attigny
- Intercommunality: CC Argonne Ardennaise

Government
  - Mayor (2020–2026): Pascal Boxebeld
- Area^{1}: 16.34 km^{2} (6.31 sq mi)
- Elevation: 121 m (397 ft)
- Highest elevation: 168 m (551 ft)
- Lowest elevation: 110 m (360 ft)
- Population (2023): 93
  - Density: 5.7/km^{2} (15/sq mi)
- Time zone: UTC+01:00 (CET)
  - Summer (DST): UTC+02:00 (CEST)
- INSEE/Postal code: 08036 /08250
- ^{1} French Land Register data, which excludes lakes, ponds, glaciers > 1 km^{2} (0.386 sq mi or 247 acres) and river estuaries.

Autry (French pronunciation: [otʁi]) is a commune in the Ardennes department in the Grand Est region of north-eastern France.

== Geography ==
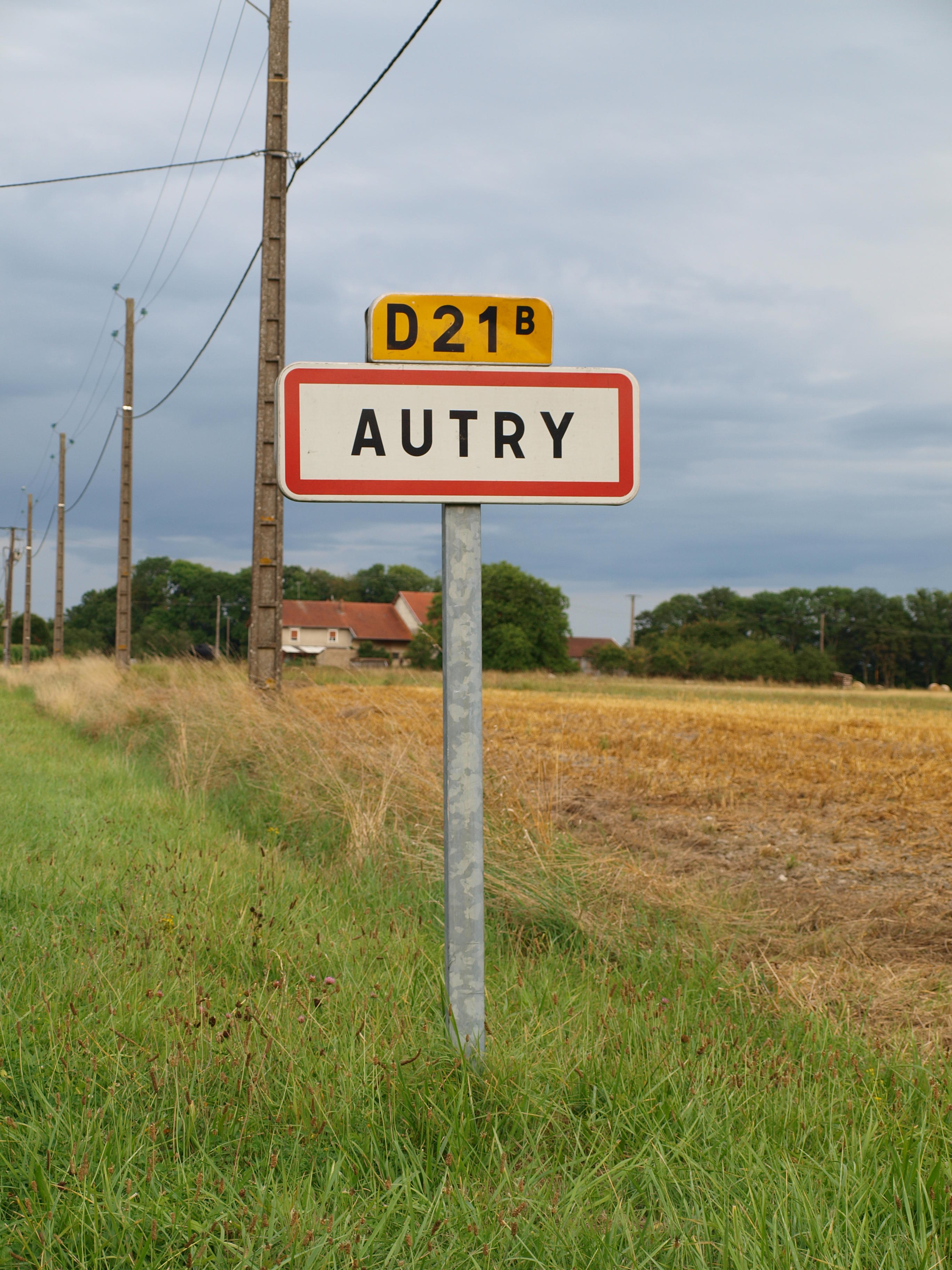
Entrance to the village

Autry is located some 50 km east of Reims and 25 km north by north-west of Sainte-Menehould. The southern border of the commune is the departmental boundary between Ardennes and Marne. Access to the commune is by road D21 from Challerange in the north-west which passes through the centre of the commune and the village and continues to Binarville in the south-east after changing to the D63 at the departmental border. The D218 goes west from the village to Bouconville and the D41 goes north-east to Lançon. Apart from the village there is the hamlet of La Gare in the west. Large areas of the commune are forested, especially in the west, and there is a large fish farm in the east. The rest of the commune is farmland.

The Aisne river forms part of the south-eastern border of the commune as it flows north then west to the village then north again as it continues its journey to join the Oise at Compiègne. The Dormoise flows from the south-west to join the Aisne in the commune. The Remy Galere rises on the northern border and flows east to join the Aisne forming part of the northern border.

=== Heraldry ===
Arms of Autry	Blazon: Bendy of six Or and Gules.

== Administration ==
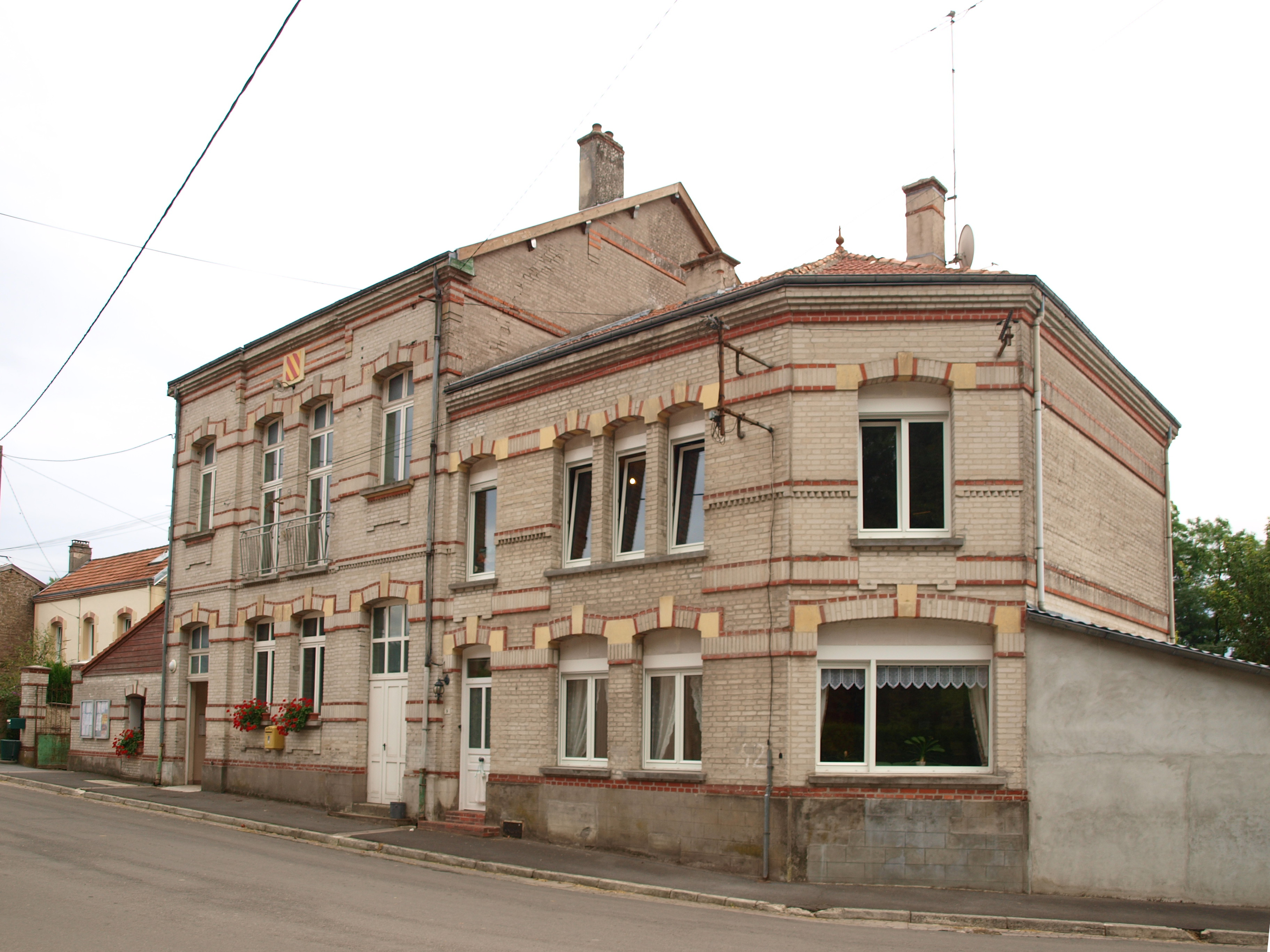
The Town Hall

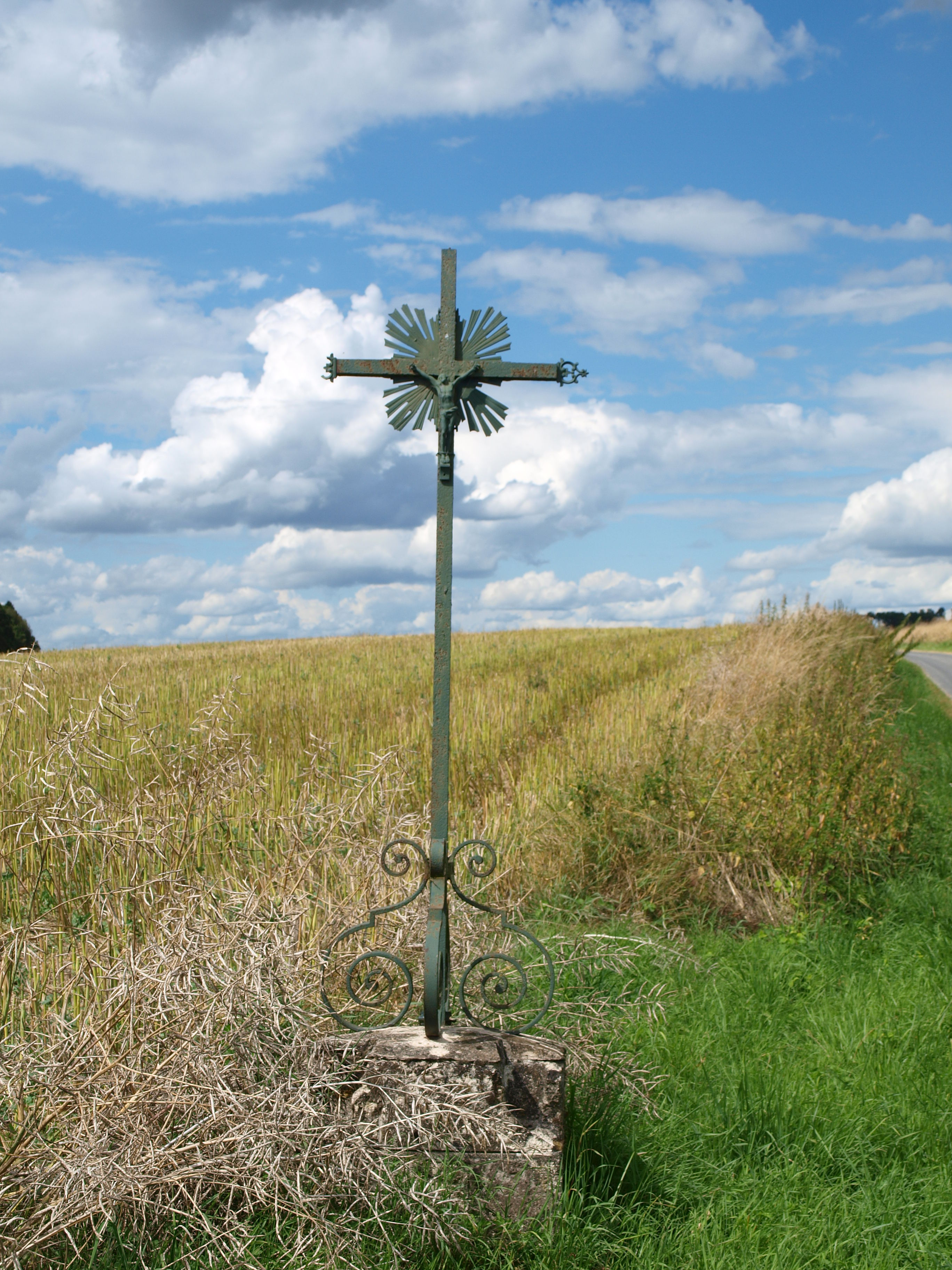
A Wayside Cross in Autry

List of Successive Mayors

From	To	Name
1995	2014	Jean-Pierre Boure
2014	current	Pascal Boxebeld

== Demography ==
The inhabitants of the commune are known as Autryens or Autryennes in French.

Historical population

Year	Pop.	±% p.a.
1793	562	—
1821	666	+0.61%
1846	679	+0.08%
1872	552	−0.79%
1901	449	−0.71%
1921	371	−0.95%
1936	251	−2.57%
1946	254	+0.12%
1962	233	−0.54%

Year	Pop.	±% p.a.
1968	187	−3.60%
1975	156	−2.56%
1982	141	−1.43%
1990	133	−0.73%
1999	127	−0.51%
2007	147	+1.84%
2012	136	−1.54%
2017	117	−2.96%
2023	93	−3.75%

Source: EHESS and INSEE

== Culture and heritage ==
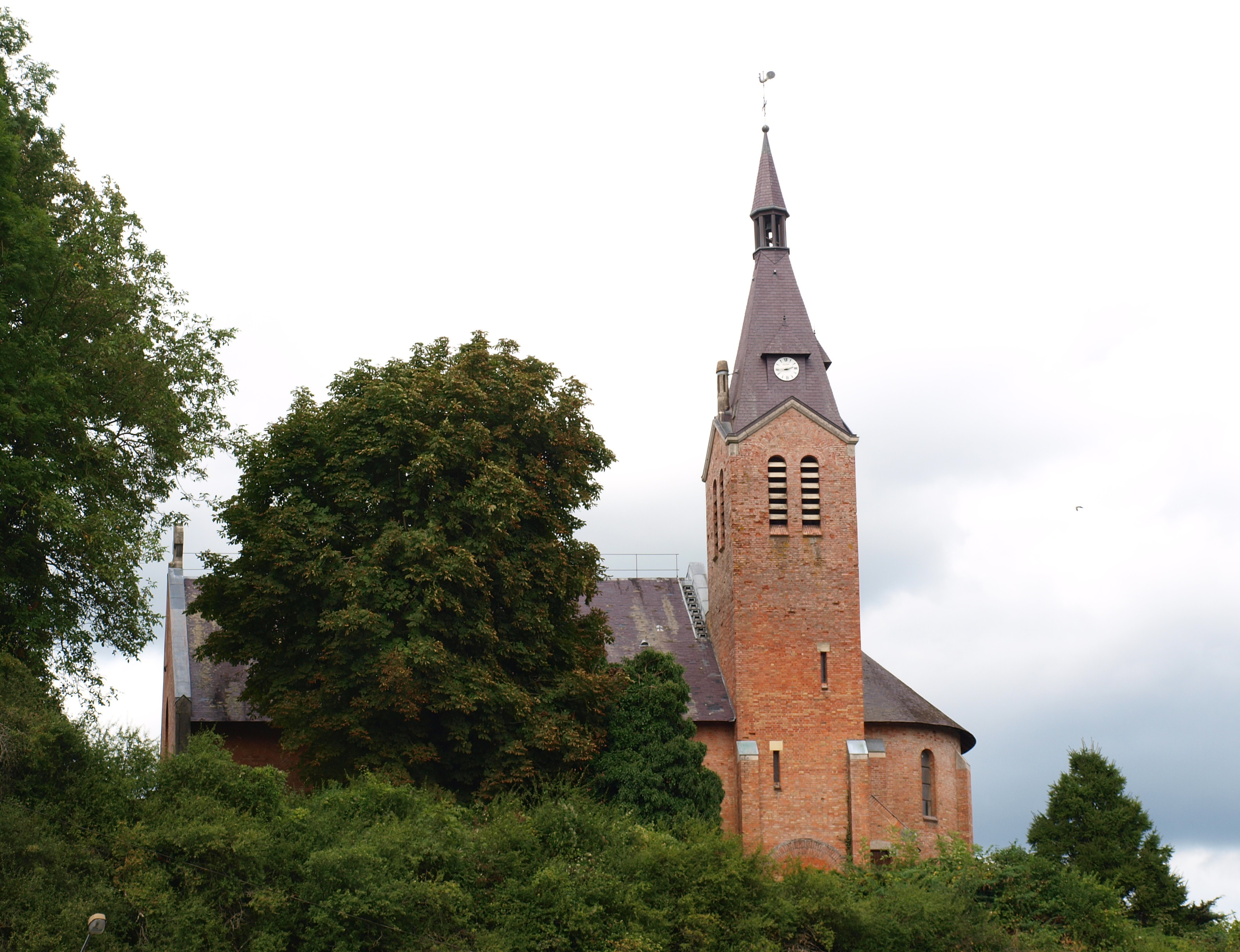
The church at Autry

=== Civil heritage ===
The commune has one structure that is registered as an historical monument:

- A Flour Mill (20th century)

Another site of interest

- Around the church in the village there are traces of a medieval fortification system.
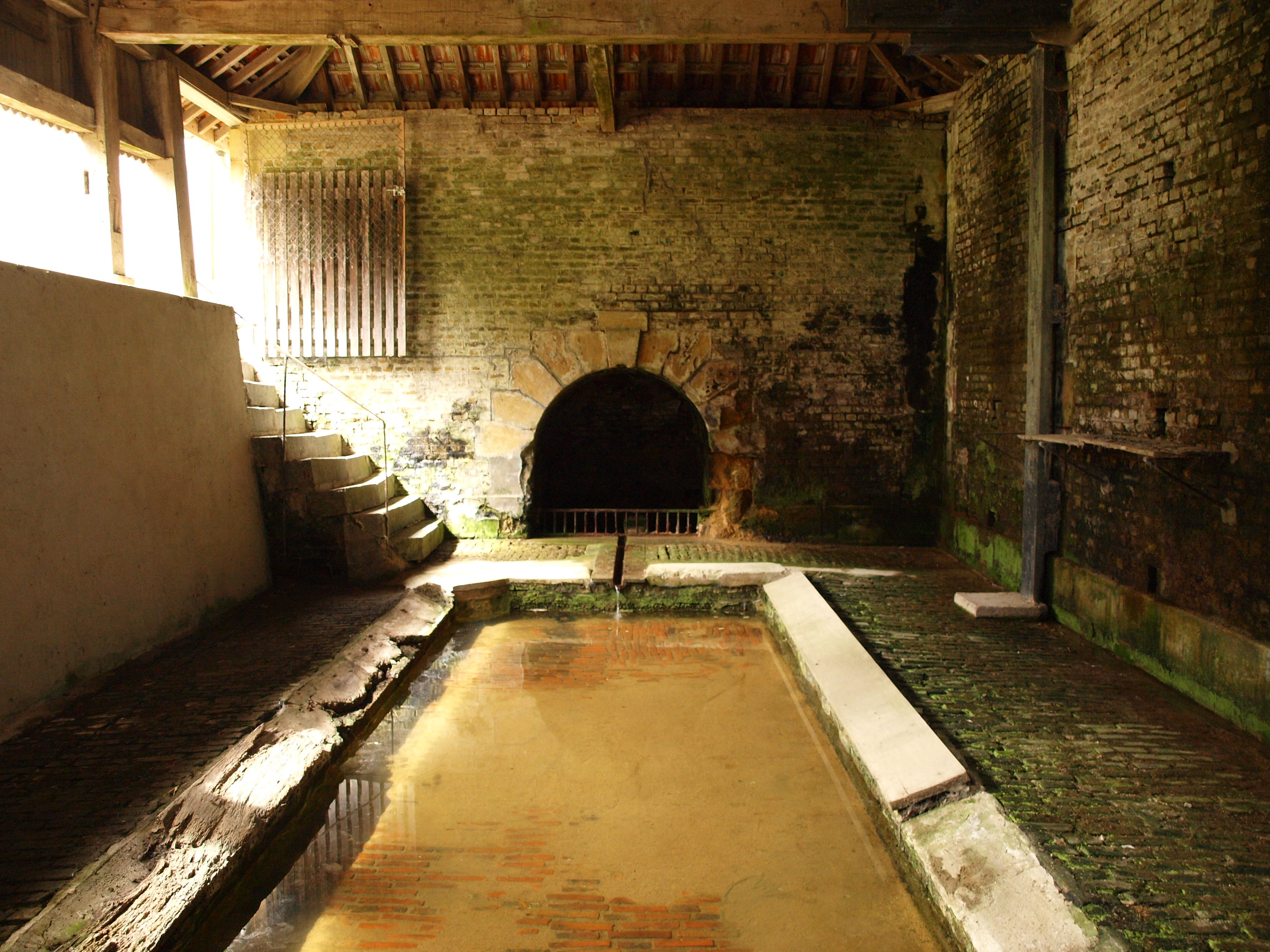
Inside the Lavoir

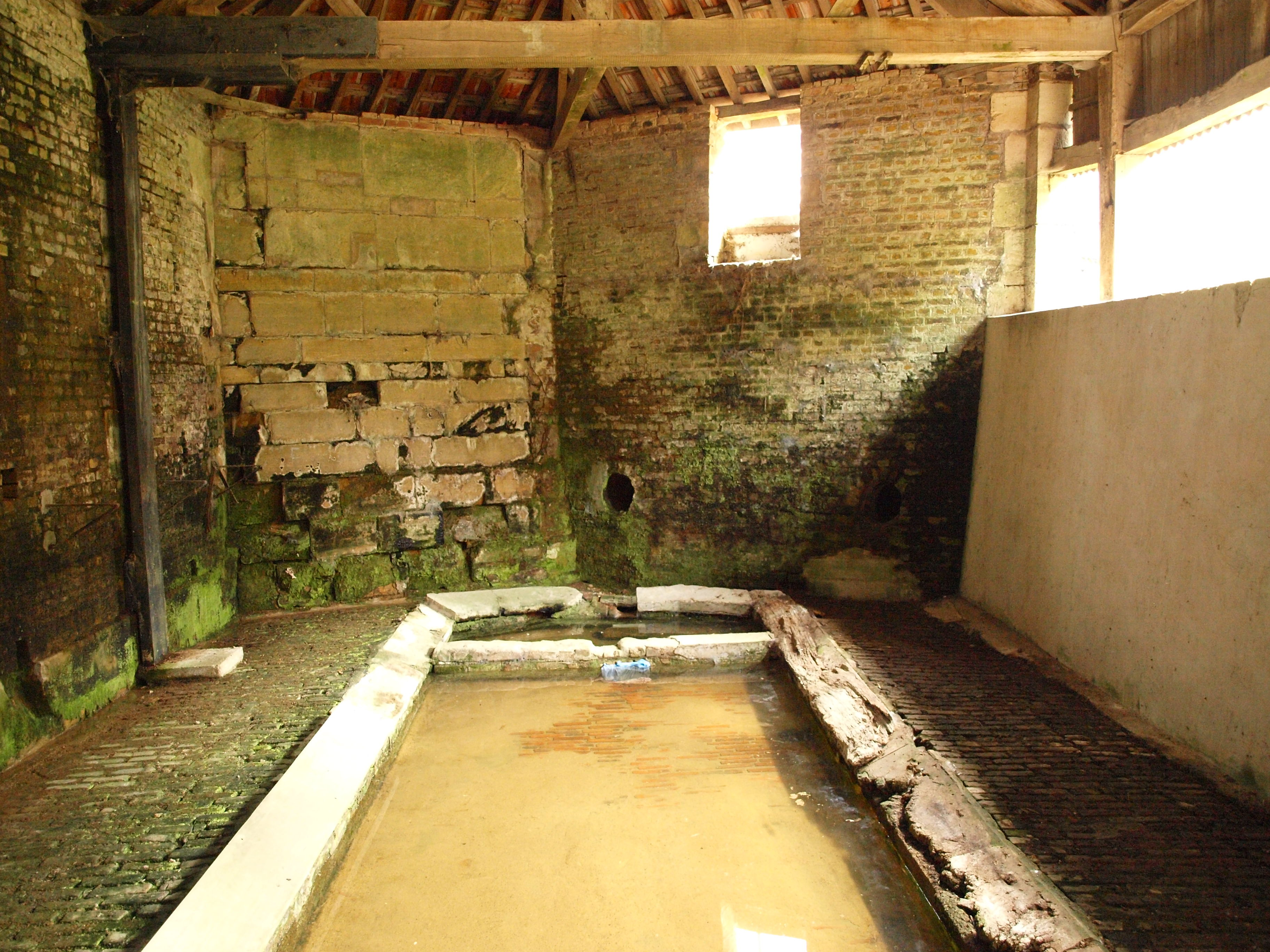
Inside the Lavoir

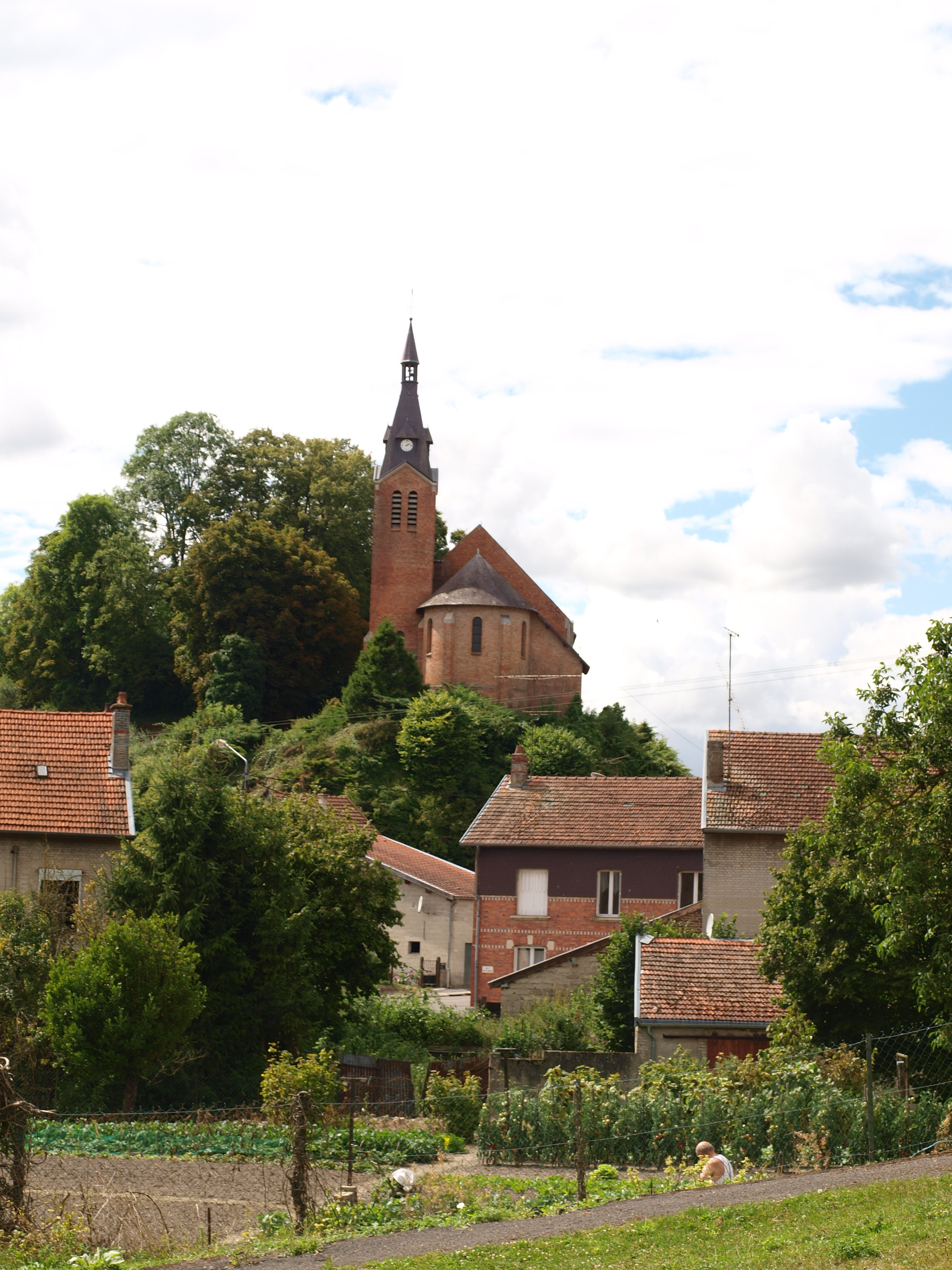
The village and the church

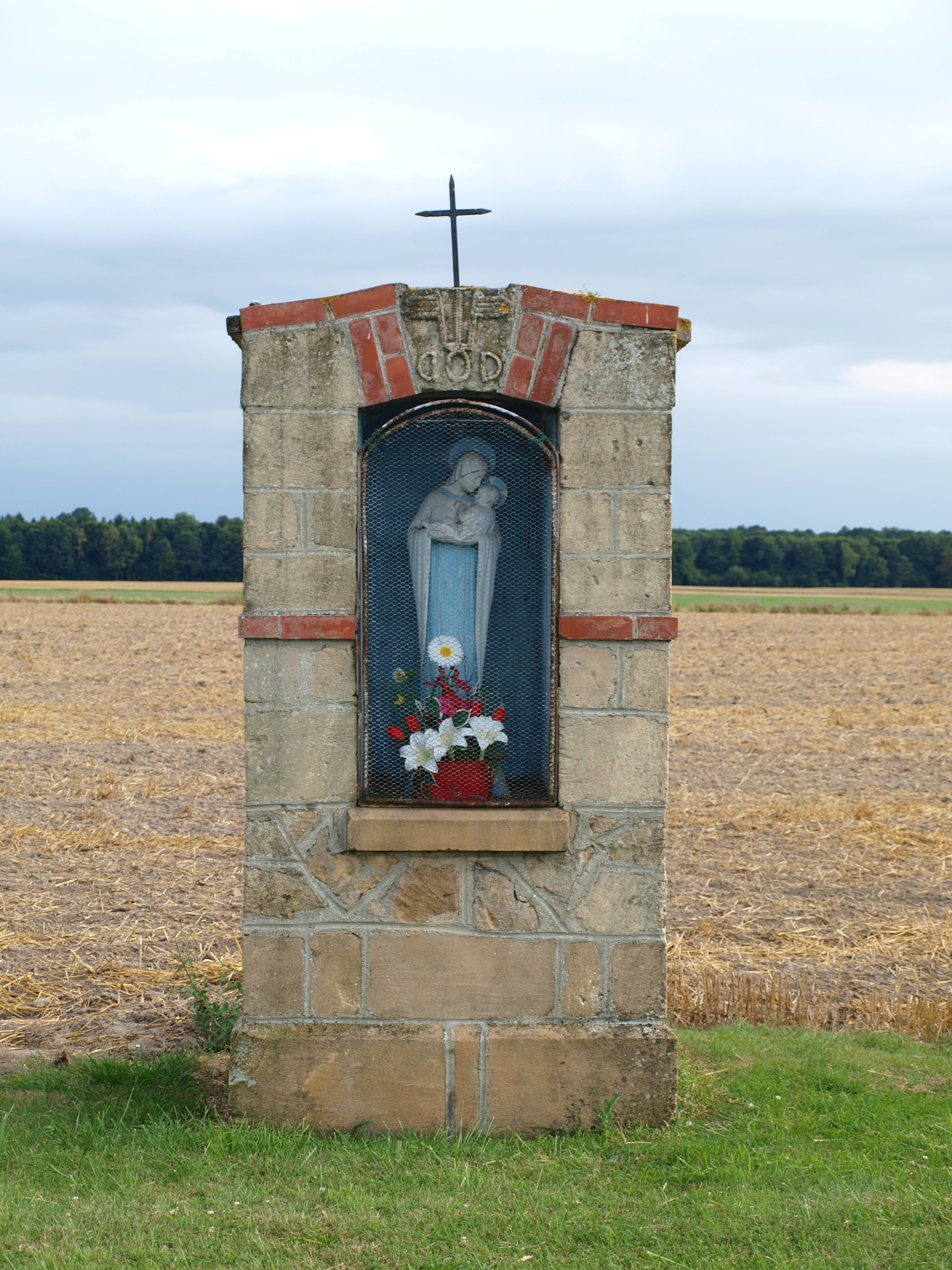
A Shrine

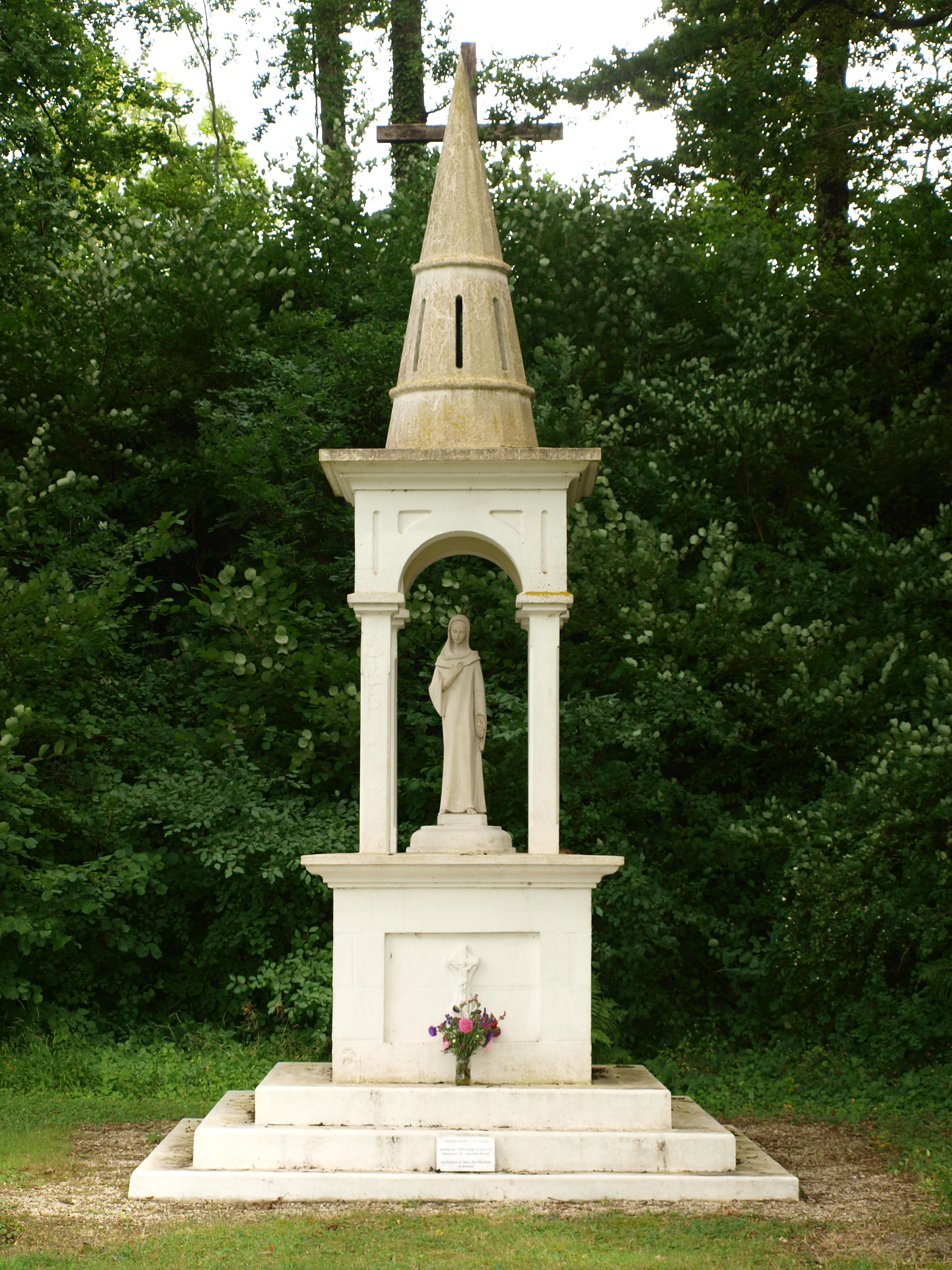
Chapel of Mary

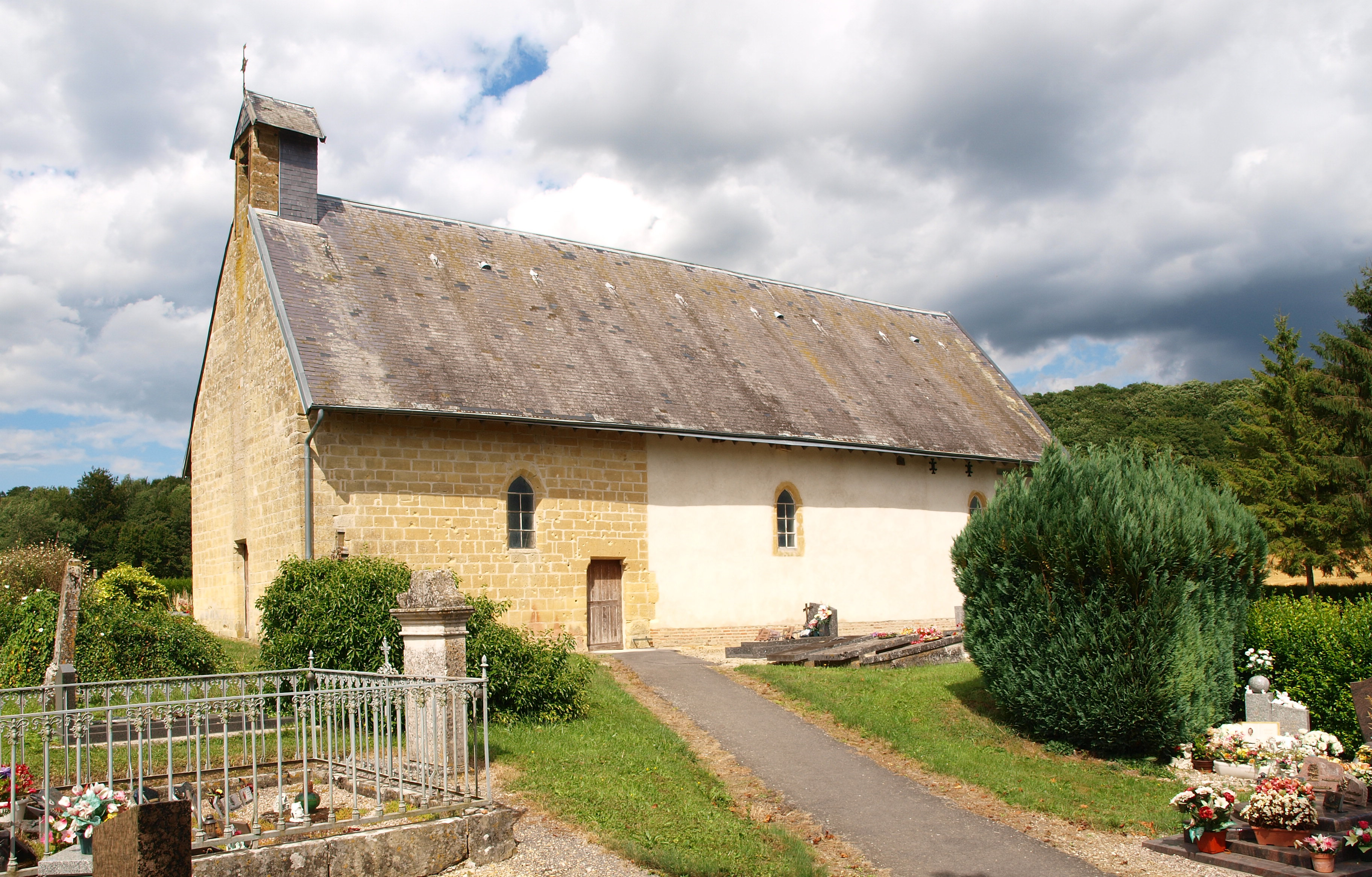
The Chapel of Saint Lambert

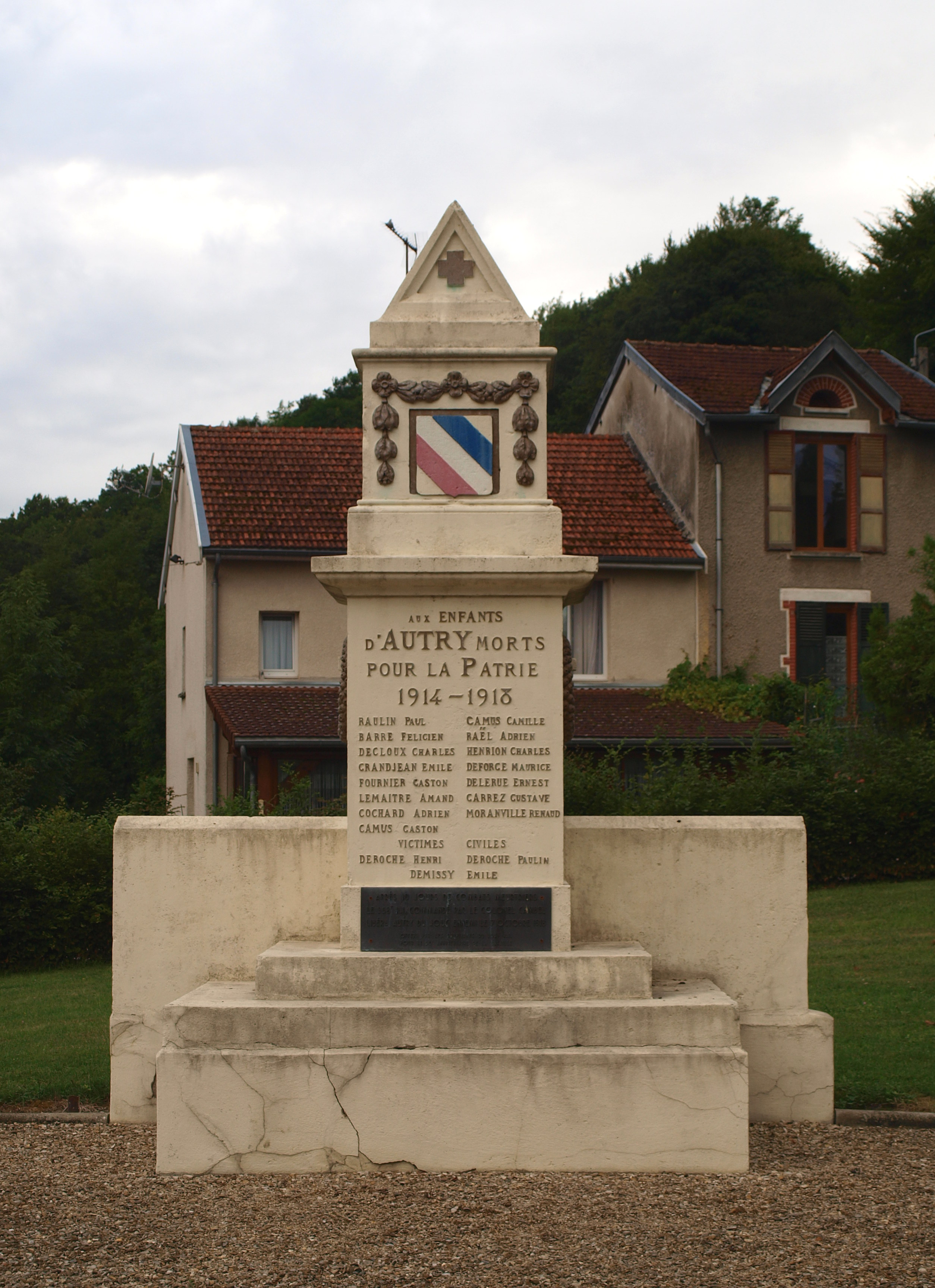
The War Memorial

== Notable people linked to the commune ==
- Louis Marie Alphonse Depuiset (1822-1886), Entomologist.

== See also ==
- Communes of the Ardennes department
