= 1942 KNILM Douglas DC-3 shootdown =

Airliner shot down during World War II over Western Australia

Coordinates: 17°07′00″S 122°15′20″E

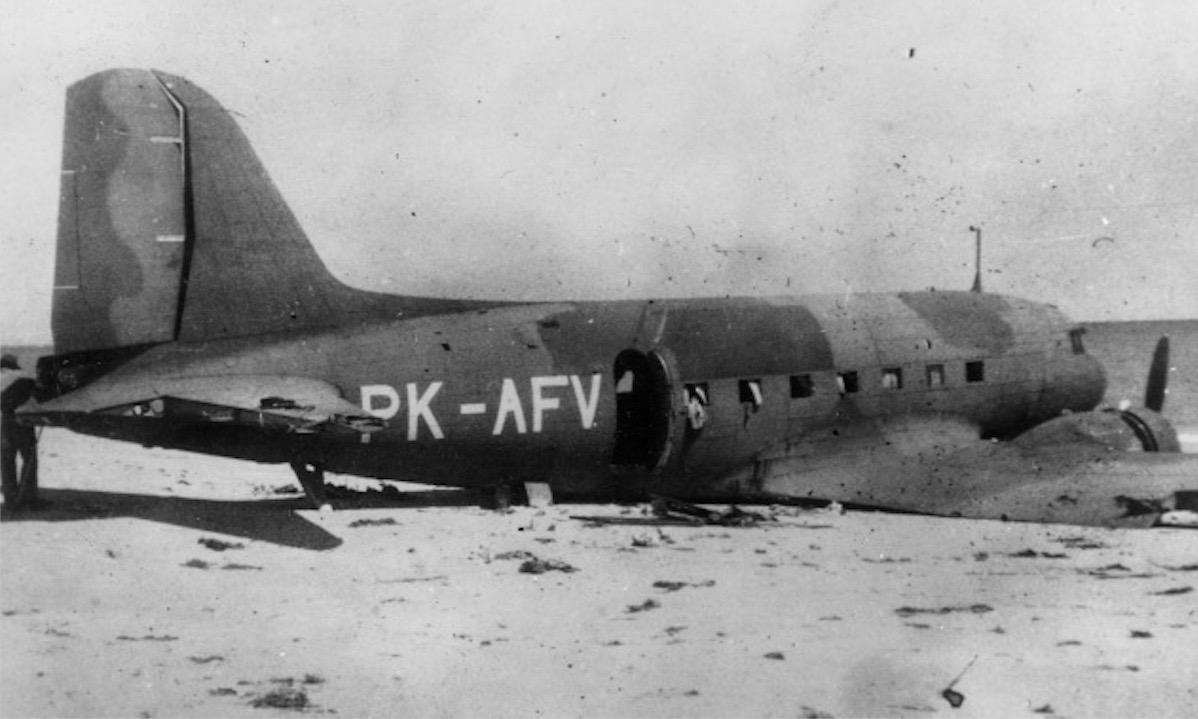
- Wreckage of Pelikaan

Accident
- Date: 3 March 1942
- Summary: Shootdown
- Site: Carnot Bay, Western Australia

Aircraft
- Aircraft type: Douglas DC-3-194
- Aircraft name: Pelikaan
- Operator: KNILM
- Registration: PK-AFV
- Flight origin: Bandung, Java, Netherlands East Indies
- Destination: Broome, Western Australia
- Passengers: 8
- Crew: 4
- Fatalities: 4
- Survivors: 8

On 3 March 1942, PK-AFV, a Douglas DC-3-194 airliner operated by KNILM, was shot down over Western Australia by Imperial Japanese Navy Air Service fighter aircraft, resulting in the deaths of four passengers and the loss of diamonds worth an estimated A£ 150,000 – 300,000, equivalent to A$12.5 – 25 million in 2022. It is believed that the diamonds were stolen after the crash, although no one has ever been convicted of stealing them.

The PK-AFV Pelikaan was on a flight from Bandung, Dutch East Indies (later Indonesia), to Broome, Western Australia when it was attacked by Japanese aircraft that were carrying out an attack on Broome. PK-AFV crash-landed on a beach at Carnot Bay, 80 kilometres (50 mi) north of Broome.

The Pelikaan was initially registered as PH-ALP and had been operated by KLM since 25 August 1937. It was based in the Netherlands. On 10 May 1940, while the Pelikaan was en route to Asia, Nazi forces invaded the Netherlands. PK-AFV was transferred to Royal Netherlands Indies Airways (KNILM) and re-registered as PK-AFV. The aircraft is sometimes incorrectly referred to as a C-47 Skytrain or Douglas Dakota, which were names given to the military variant of the DC-3.

== Final flight ==
On 3 March 1942, the pilot of PK-AFV was a Russian World War I ace, Ivan Smirnov (or Smirnoff). The other three crew members were co-pilot Jo Hoffman, radio operator Jo Muller and flight engineer N. J. Blaauw. They were transporting eight passengers, fleeing the Japanese invasion of Java. Among the passengers were five pilots from the army and navy.

A package containing diamonds, which belonged to a Bandung firm named NV de Concurrent, was handed to Smirnov in the early morning of 3 March by G. J. Wisse, the KNILM station manager at Andir Bandung airport. Smirnov was instructed to hand the package to a representative of the Commonwealth Bank once he reached Australia. He was reportedly unaware of the package contents at the time. The plane was airborne at 1:15 am.

At about 9:00 am, as the DC-3 neared Broome, skirting the Kimberley coast, three Mitsubishi Zeroes – led by the Japanese ace Lt Zenjiro Miyano – were returning to their base in Timor, after the first air raid on Broome. Smirnov was following the coastline towards Broome. The Japanese pilots, who were at a higher altitude than the DC-3, dived at it and fired at its port side, scoring numerous hits. The port engine caught fire and Smirnov was wounded in his arms and hip, but managed to put the aircraft into a steep spiral dive.

Smirnoff made a wheels-down landing on the beach, according to his 1947 book De Toekomst heeft Vleugels (transl. The Future has Wings). This procedure was described in many interviews in papers and on BBC Radio in 1944. Smirnoff was surprised the wheels went down. While rolling along the ground, the right tire was hit and exploded causing the plane to make an abrupt right turn into the surf and deeper water. The splash extinguished the fire in the number one engine. This story is consistent with the stories told by surviving passengers Pieter Cramerus in a video interview and Leo Vanderburg in "Flight of Diamonds" by William H Tyler in 1986. A photograph in Smirnof's book on pages 72 and 73 shows that the undercarriage under engine 1 is down.

The Zeroes then strafed the DC-3. The flight engineer and three passengers, including a baby, were killed and others seriously injured by bullets. Smirnov reported that the package was dropped in the water or in the plane during a recovery attempt by Van Romondt. The following day, as the survivors awaited a rescue party, a Japanese Kawanishi H6K flying boat spotted the wreck and dropped two bombs. The Kawanishi later returned and dropped another two bombs. None of the bombs caused any damage or injuries. The surviving passengers and crew were saved after spending six days on the beach.

A mariner from Broome named Jack Palmer, arrived at the scene of the crash, a couple of days after the rescue. He later handed in over £A 20,000 worth of diamonds. In May 1943, Palmer and two associates, James Mulgrue and Frank Robinson, were tried in the Supreme Court of Western Australia for theft of the diamonds. All three were acquitted. No other person has been tried for the loss of the diamonds.

== See also ==
- List of airliner shootdown incidents
- 1942 Qantas Short Empire shootdown

== General references ==
- Parke, Erin; Seabourne, Andy (7 December 2024). "Revisiting a WWII Plane Crash and a Case About Missing Diamonds". ABC News.
- Shores, Christopher F. (2014). "Clean Sweep at Broome". In Davies, John (ed.). Bloody Shambles. Vol. 2. London: Grub Street. ISBN 978-0-948817-67-0 – via Internet Archive.
- Tyler, William H. (1987). Flight of Diamonds: the Story of Broome's War and the Carnot Bay Diamonds. Hesperian Press. ISBN 978-0-85905-105-7.
- Wills, Juliet; Velzen, Marianne van (2006). The Diamond Dakota Mystery. Allen & Unwin. ISBN 978-1-74114-745-2.
