= Escadrille 124 =

Escadrille 124 may refer to one of the following French Air Force units:

- Escadrille N.124, more commonly known as the Lafayette Escadrille existed from 21 March 1916 - 18 February 1918
- Escadrille Americaine is an earlier name for the Lafayette Escadrille
- Escadrille SPA.124 (Jeanne d'Arc) was raised on 19 February 1918 as a replacement for Escadrille N.124 and still exists
- Escadrille N.124 (Tete de Sioux) is a squadron in the present day French Air Force
