= Escadrille SPA.124 =

Escadrille SPA 124 'Jeanne d’Arc'
- Active: 1918 (1916)
- Country: France
- Branch: French Air Service
- Type: Fighter Squadron
- Nickname(s): Escadrille Jeanne D'Arc
- Engagements: World War I

Escadrille SPA.124 of the French Air Service was established in February 1918. The members of the earlier Escadrille N.124, more widely known as the Lafayette Escadrille, largely transferred into the United States Air Service on 18 February as the 103rd Aero Squadron. The remaining French personnel were formed into a unit operating SPADs. In May 1918, the unit was dubbed the Escadrille Jeanne d'Arc to differentiate it from its famous predecessor.

== History ==
Escadrille SPA.124 was originally commanded by Lieutenant André d'Humières. Though originally slated for incorporation into Groupe de Combat 15, it was assigned to Groupe de Combat 21 (GC.21) to support the IVe Armée. Other squadrons in GC.21 included the 103d Aero Squadron, Escadrille N 98, and Escadrille N 157. Capitaine Lucien Couret de Villeneuve was appointed to command GC.21. Three Portuguese pilots, de Souza-Maya, Dos Santos-Leite, Lello Portela, and one Czech pilot, Vaclav Pilat, transferred to the Escadrille Jeanne d'Arc, and kept its international flavor.

GC.21 was assigned to IVe Armée of the French Army. On 10 April 1918, Escadrille.SPA 163 rotated into the Group as the 103rd Aero Squadron departed. On 25 May, GC.21 transferred to Ve Armée. The First Colonial Army cited GC.21 for destroying four observation balloons in seven days. On 2 June 1918, the group was reassigned to VIe Armée as a Groupe de Chasse. On 3 July 1918, GC.21 was posted back to Ve Armée. By war's end, Escadrille SPA 124 was credited with 28 aerial victories.

Escadrille SPA.124, the Jeanne d'Arc Escadrille, continues in service in today's French Air Force."September 3, 2008, the SPA 124 became the 3rd Squadron of the 2/5 Ile-de-France Fighter Squadron."

== Notable personnel ==
- Pavel Argeyev
