= Alexander Kazakov =

Russian flying ace (1889–1919)

Alexander Alexandrovich Kozakov
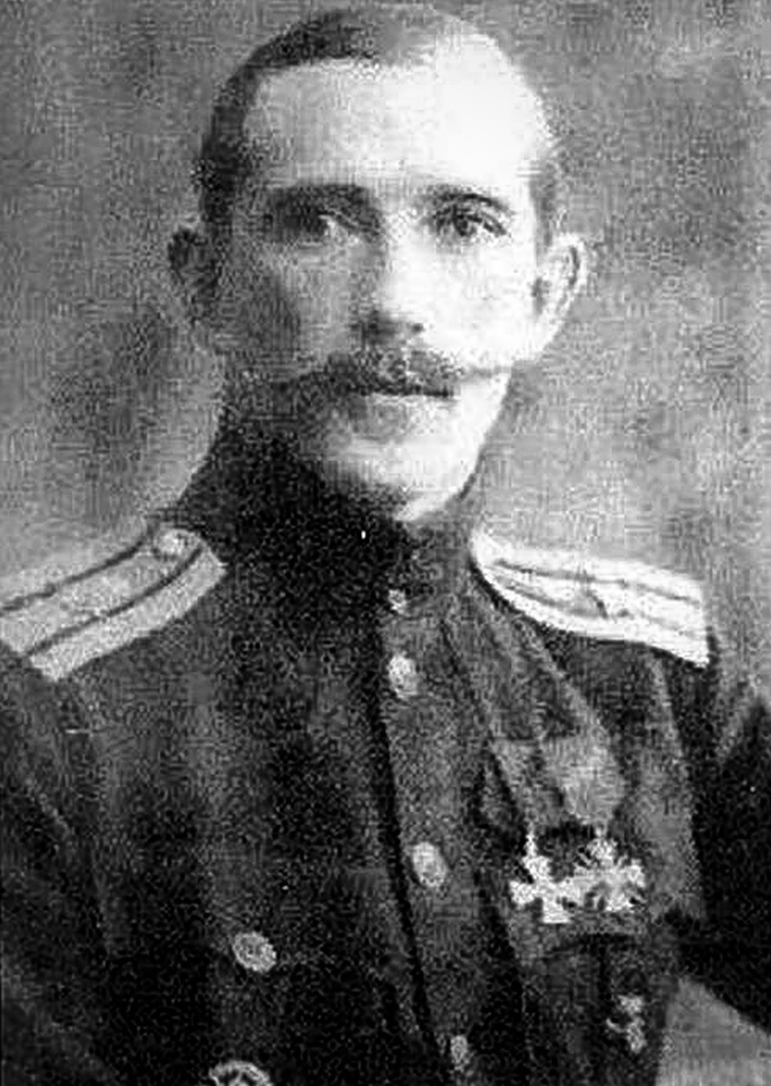
- Alexander Kazakov (c. 1917)
- Born: 2 January 1889; Kherson Governorate, Russian Empire
- Died: 1 August 1919 (aged 30); Vicinity of Benezniky
- Military career
- Allegiance: Russian Empire; British Empire
- Branch: Imperial Russian Army; Imperial Russian Air Force; Royal Air Force
- Service years: 1908–1918 (Russia); 1918–1919 (UK)
- Rank: Lieutenant Colonel (Russia); Major (UK)
- Unit: 4th Corps Air Detachment
- Commands: 19th Corps Fighter Detachment
- Awards: Order of Saint George; Order of Saint Vladimir; Order of Saint Stanislas; Order of Saint Anne; British Distinguished Service Order; Military Cross; Distinguished Flying Cross; French Legion d'Honneur and Croix De Guerre

Alexander Alexandrovich Kazakov (Kozakov, Kosakoff) (Russian: Александр Александрович Казаков) (2 January 1889 – 1 August 1919) (British Distinguished Service Order and Military Cross and the French Légion d'honneur) was the most successful Russian flying ace and fighter pilot during the First World War.

== Pre World War I ==
Born to a Russian noble family in Kherson Governorate, Kazakov graduated from Yelizavetgrad cavalry school in 1908. He did his stint in cavalry, but in 1913 he began formal training as a pilot and graduated at the beginning of World War I from Gatchina military aviation school.

== World War I ==
Alexander Kazakov flew Morane-Saulnier, Spad – SА2, Nieuport 11 and Nieuport 17 planes and is alleged to have the largest number of victories over enemy aircraft among Imperial Russian Air Force pilots. Unofficially he shot down 32 German and Austro-Hungarian planes, although his official tally is only 20 because only planes that crashed in Russian-held territory were counted. Russian military aviation tradition during World War I was different from that of its Western allies and rivals and the individual scores of pilots were considered to be of lesser value compared to their contribution to the overall war effort.

On 31 March 1915 Alexander Kazakov successfully repeated the aerial ramming attack first attempted by Pyotr Nesterov, using a Morane-Saulnier G as his piloted projectile. For this bit of daring, he was awarded the Order of Saint Anne, first in the Fourth Class, then in the Third. He was appointed to command of 19th Corps Fighter Detachment in September 1915. Here he had Nieuport 10s and Nieuport 11s to fly. Between 27 June and 21 December 1916, he racked up four more victories to become an ace.

Five months later, Kazakov resumed his winning streak with his sixth victory on 6 May 1917, which was shared with Ernst Leman and Pavel Argeyev. By 25 May, with his eighth win, he switched to a Nieuport 17, which he used henceforth. Between 1915 and 1917 he fought on the Russian front as well as in Romania and participated in the Brusilov Offensive as a commander of 1st Combat Air Group.

In January 1918, in the wake of the Bolshevik Revolution, Kazakov resigned his Russian commission.

== Russian Civil War ==
During the Russian Civil War Kazakov joined the Slavo-British Allied Legion in Arkhangelsk and fought against the Workers' and Peasants' Red Air Fleet.

On 1 August 1918 Kazakov became a major in the Royal Air Force and was appointed to be commanding officer in charge of an aviation squadron of the Slavo-British Allied Legion made up of Sopwith Camel planes. After the British withdrawal from Russia which left the Russian White Army in a desperate situation, Kazakov died in a plane crash during an air show on 1 August 1919 which was performed to boost the morale of the Russian anti-Bolshevik troops. Most witnesses of the incident, including British ace James Ira Jones, thought Kazakov committed suicide.

== Honours and awards ==
- Order of St. George, 4th class (31 July 1917, Russian Empire)
- Order of St. Vladimir, 4th class (7 September 1916, Russian Empire)
- Order of St. Anne, 2nd, 3rd and 4th classes (respectively, 27 April 1917, 4 February 1915, 27 January 1916; Russian Empire)
- Order of St. Stanislaus, 2nd and 3rd classes (4 July 1916, 18 August 1913, Russian Empire)
- Gold Sword for Bravery (28 July 1915)
- Distinguished Service Order (UK, 1918)
- Military Cross (UK, 1919)
- Distinguished Flying Cross (United Kingdom, 20 March 1919)
- Chevalier of the Legion of Honour (France)
- Croix de guerre (France)
