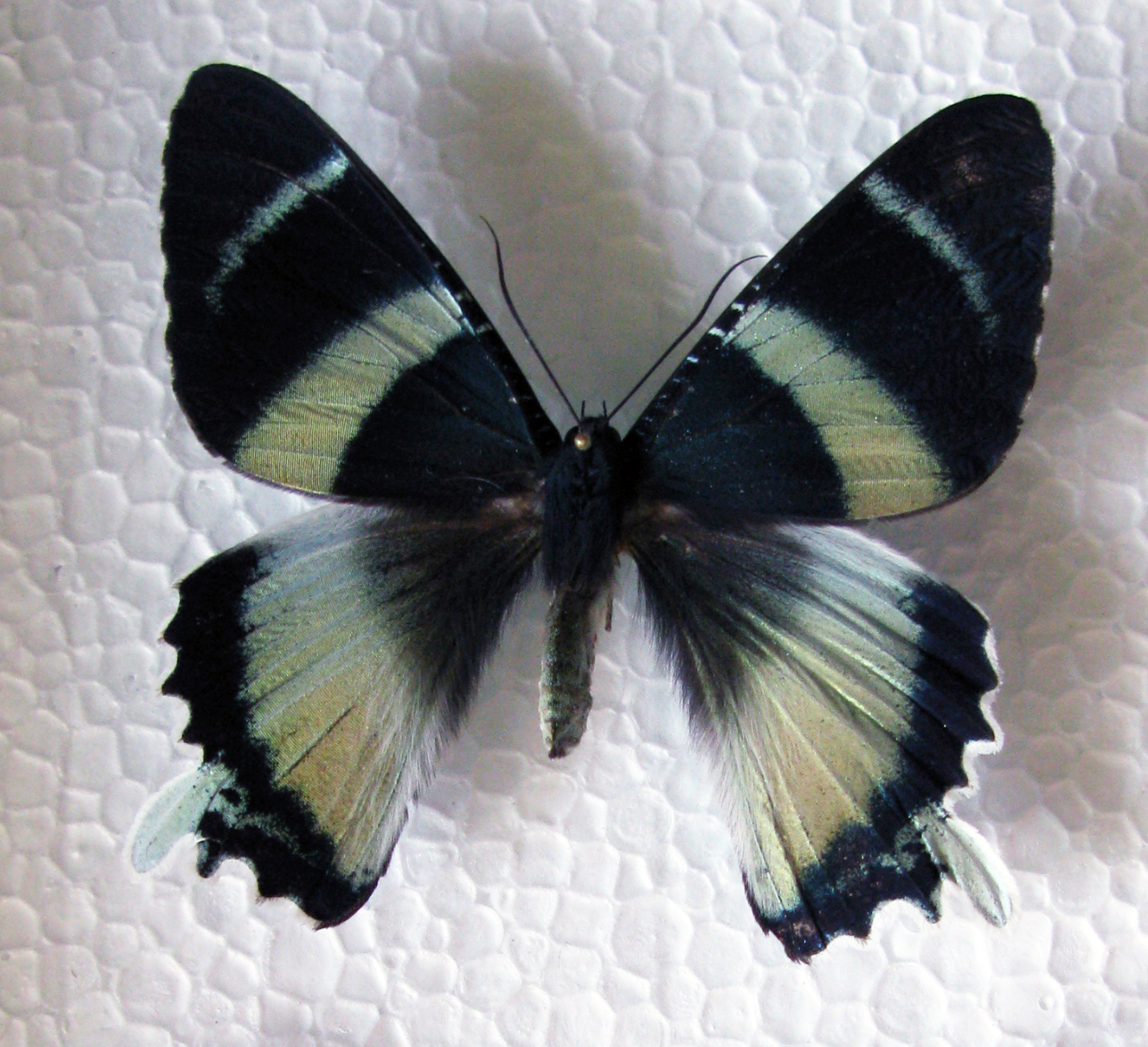
- Alcides agathyrsus

Scientific classification
- Kingdom: Animalia
- Phylum: Arthropoda
- Clade: Pancrustacea
- Class: Insecta
- Order: Lepidoptera
- Family: Uraniidae
- Subfamily: Uraniinae
- Genus: Alcides; Hübner, 1822

Synonyms
- Alcidia Westwood, 1879; Orontes Swainson, 1833; Alcidis Hübner, 1823 (lapsus)

= Alcides =

Genus of moths

Alcides is a genus of uraniid moths from northern Australia, New Guinea, and other islands in the region. They are diurnal and strongly marked with iridescent colours.

== List of species ==
- Alcides agathyrsus Kirsch, 1877 [syn.= A. boops (Westwood, 1879)]
- Alcides aruus Felder, 1874
- Alcides aurora Salvin & Godman, 1877
- Alcides cydnus Felder, 1859
- Alcides latona Druce, 1886
- Alcides leone Vinciguerra, 2007
- Alcides metaurus Hopffer, 1856 [syn.=A. zodiaca (Butler, 1869)]
- Alcides orontes Linnaeus, 1763
- Alcides privitera Vinciguerra, 2007

Current systematic and taxonomic knowledge of Genus Alcides is incomplete, so the status of some taxa remains uncertain, for example:

- Alcides argyrios Gmelin, 1788
- Alcides arnus Felder & Rogenhofer, 1874 (Probably misprint for aruus)
- Alcides coerulea Pfeiff., 1925
- Alcides latona Druce, 1886 [vide supra] vs. Alcides ribbei [vide infra]
- Alcides liris Felder, 1860
- Alcides pallida Pfeiff., 1925
- Alcides passavanti Pfeiff., 1925
- Alcides ribbei Pagenstecher, 1912 (Perhaps junior synonym of Alcides latona?)
- Alcides sordidior Rothschild, 1916
