= Louis Marie Alphonse Depuiset =

French entomologist

Louis Marie Alphonse Depuiset (20 September 1822 Autuy, Ardennes – 17 March 1886 Paris) was a French entomologist who specialised in Lepidoptera.

He was, from 1850, an insect dealer in Paris and a close friend of Jean Baptiste Boisduval. He also worked with George Sand and Maurice Sand.

He wrote Catalogue méthodique des Lépidoptères d'Europe (1861) and Description d'une nouvelle espèce de Lépidoptère du g. Papilio, provenant de la Nouvelle-Guinée (1878).

In 1867 he published Genera des lẻpidoptềres. Histoire naturelle des papillons d'Europe et leurs chenilles, within a book by M. Sand & G. Sand: Le monde des papillons. Promenade ầ travers champs. J. Rothschild Paris, pp.1-153. pl.50.
