= Quatre-Champs =

- Commune
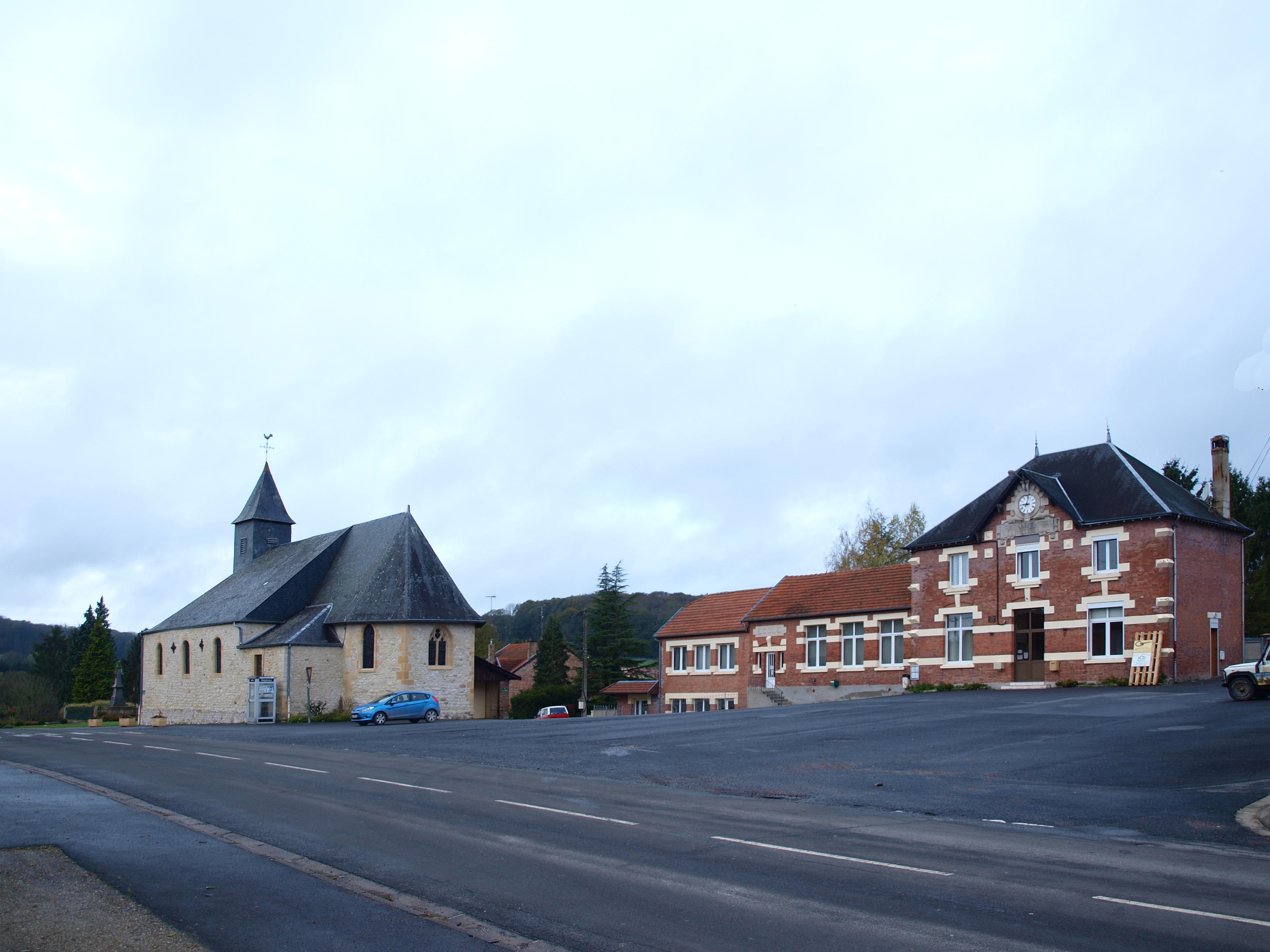
- Church and town hall
- Location of Quatre-Champs
- Location within France Location within Grand Est
- Coordinates: 49°26′46″N 4°46′05″E
- Country: France
- Region: Grand Est
- Department: Ardennes
- Arrondissement: Vouziers
- Canton: Vouziers
- Intercommunality: Argonne Ardennaise

Government
  - Mayor (2020–2026): Tony Besançon
- Area^{1}: 11.51 km^{2} (4.44 sq mi)
- Elevation: 145 m (476 ft)
- Population (2023): 241
  - Density: 20.9/km^{2} (54.2/sq mi)
- Time zone: UTC+01:00 (CET)
  - Summer (DST): UTC+02:00 (CEST)
- INSEE/Postal code: 08350 /08400
- ^{1} French Land Register data, which excludes lakes, ponds, glaciers > 1 km^{2} (0.386 sq mi or 247 acres) and river estuaries.

Quatre-Champs (French pronunciation: [katʁ ʃɑ̃]) is a commune in the Ardennes department of northern France.

== Population ==
Historical population
Year	Pop.	±% p.a.
1968	212	—
1975	156	−4.29%
1982	170	+1.24%
1990	187	+1.20%
1999	189	+0.12%
2007	196	+0.46%
2012	194	−0.20%
2017	218	+2.36%
2023	241	+1.69%
Source: INSEE

== See also ==
- Communes of the Ardennes department
