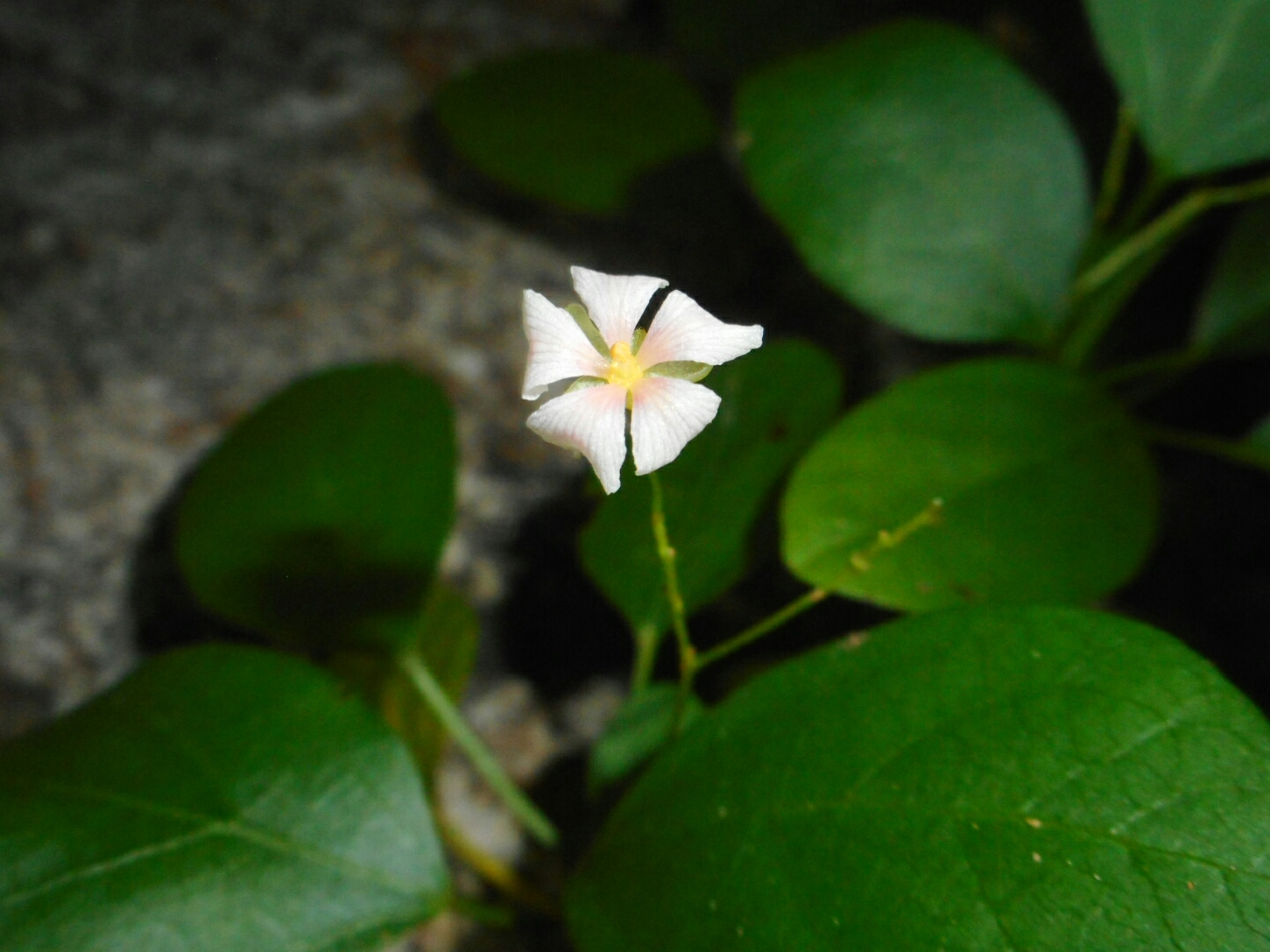
- Trigonostemon fragilis in Vietnam

Scientific classification
- Kingdom: Plantae
- Clade: Tracheophytes
- Clade: Angiosperms
- Clade: Eudicots
- Clade: Rosids
- Order: Malpighiales
- Family: Euphorbiaceae
- Subfamily: Crotonoideae
- Tribe: Trigonostemoneae
- Genus: Trigonostemon; Blume

Synonyms
- Trigostemon Blume, spelling variation; Enchidium Jack; Silvaea Hook. & Arn.; Athroisma Griff. 1854, illegitimate name, not DC. 1833 (Asteraceae); Telogyne Baill.; Tritaxis Baill.; Tylosepalum Kurz ex Teijsm. & Binn.; Nepenthandra S.Moore; Prosartema Gagnep.; Actephilopsis Ridl.; Poilaniella Gagnep.; Neotrigonostemon Pax & K.Hoffm.; Kurziodendron N.P.Balakr.

= Trigonostemon =

Genus of flowering plants

Trigonostemon is a plant genus of the family Euphorbiaceae and the sole member of its tribe (Trigonostemoneae). It was first described as a genus in 1826. It is native to Southeast Asia, southern China, the Indian subcontinent, Queensland, and a few islands in the western Pacific.

Species

1. Trigonostemon adenocalyx - Vietnam
2. Trigonostemon albiflorus - Thailand, Guangxi
3. Trigonostemon angustifolius - Philippines
4. Trigonostemon apetalogyne - W New Guinea
5. Trigonostemon aurantiacus - Andaman & Nicobar Is, Thailand, Malaysia, Sumatra, Java, Myanmar
6. Trigonostemon beccarii - Sumatra
7. Trigonostemon birmanicus - Myanmar
8. Trigonostemon bonianus - Vietnam, Yunnan
9. Trigonostemon capillipes - Thailand, Borneo, W Malaysia, Surigao
10. Trigonostemon capitellatus - Laos, Vietnam
11. Trigonostemon carnosulus - W Malaysia
12. Trigonostemon cherrieri - New Caledonia
13. Trigonostemon chinensis - Vietnam, S China
14. Trigonostemon cochinchinensis - Vietnam
15. Trigonostemon croceus - W Malaysia
16. Trigonostemon detritiferus - Brunei
17. Trigonostemon diffusus - Sarawak
18. Trigonostemon diplopetalus - Sri Lanka
19. Trigonostemon dipteranthus - Sumatra
20. Trigonostemon eberhardtii - Vietnam
21. Trigonostemon elegantissimus - Borneo
22. Trigonostemon elmeri - Sabah
23. Trigonostemon everettii - Philippines
24. Trigonostemon filiformis - Luzon
25. Trigonostemon flavidus - Hainan, Laos, Myanmar, Thailand
26. Trigonostemon fragilis - Guangxi, Hainan, Vietnam
27. Trigonostemon gaudichaudii - Vietnam
28. Trigonostemon hartleyi - Papua New Guinea
29. Trigonostemon heteranthus - Myanmar, Thailand, W Malaysia, Borneo, Sumatra
30. Trigonostemon hirsutus - Philippines, Sabah, Sarawak
31. Trigonostemon howii - Hainan, Vietnam
32. Trigonostemon hybridus - Cambodia
33. Trigonostemon inopinatus - Queensland
34. Trigonostemon ionthocarpus - Sabah, Sarawak
35. Trigonostemon kerrii - Thailand
36. Trigonostemon laetus - Myanmar
37. Trigonostemon laevigatus - Andaman Is., Indochina, Philippines, Borneo, Sumatra
38. Trigonostemon lanceolatus - Myanmar
39. Trigonostemon laoticus - Laos
40. Trigonostemon laxiflorus - Philippines
41. Trigonostemon longipedunculatus - Philippines, Borneo
42. Trigonostemon longipes - Philippines
43. Trigonostemon magnificus - Sumatra
44. Trigonostemon malaccanus - W Malaysia, N Sumatra
45. Trigonostemon matangensis - Sarawak
46. Trigonostemon matanginsu - Sarawak
47. Trigonostemon merrillii - Philippines, Sabah
48. Trigonostemon murtonii - Thailand, Vietnam
49. Trigonostemon nemoralis - SW India, Sri Lanka
50. Trigonostemon nigrifolius - Myanmar
51. Trigonostemon oblanceolatus - Philippines
52. Trigonostemon pachyphyllus - S Thailand
53. Trigonostemon pentandrus - W Malaysia
54. Trigonostemon philippinensis - Philippines, Borneo, Sumatra
55. Trigonostemon phyllocalyx - Thailand, Vietnam
56. Trigonostemon pierrei - Phú Quốc Island
57. Trigonostemon poilanei - Vietnam
58. Trigonostemon polyanthus - Philippines, Borneo
59. Trigonostemon praetervisus - N Bangladesh
60. Trigonostemon quocensis - Cambodia, Vietnam, Thailand, Myanmar
61. Trigonostemon reidioides - Cambodia, Vietnam, Thailand, Myanmar, Laos
62. Trigonostemon rubescens - Laos, Cambodia
63. Trigonostemon rufescens- W Malaysia
64. Trigonostemon salicifolius - Selangor
65. Trigonostemon sandakanensis - Sabah
66. Trigonostemon sanguineus - Vietnam
67. Trigonostemon semperflorens - Assam, Bangladesh
68. Trigonostemon serratus - Bali, Java
69. Trigonostemon sinclairii - W Malaysia
70. Trigonostemon stellaris - Vietnam
71. Trigonostemon stenophyllus - Luzon
72. Trigonostemon sunirmalii - Myanmar
73. Trigonostemon thorelii - Laos
74. Trigonostemon thyrsoideus - S China, Indochina
75. Trigonostemon tuberculatus - Yunnan
76. Trigonostemon verrucosus - Java
77. Trigonostemon verticillatus - S Thailand, W Malaysia, Sumatra
78. Trigonostemon villosus - W Malaysia, Sumatra, Borneo, Nicobar Is
79. Trigonostemon viridissimus - Assam, Andaman Is, W Malaysia, Sumatra, Myanmar, Bali
80. Trigonostemon voratus - Fiji
81. Trigonostemon wenzelii - Leyte
82. Trigonostemon wetriifolius - W Malaysia
83. Trigonostemon whiteanus - Philippines
84. Trigonostemon xyphophylloides - Hainan

formerly included

moved to other genera (Cleidion Croton Dimorphocalyx Omphalea Paracroton Wetria )

1. T. arboreus - Omphalea malayana
2. T. asahanensis - Dimorphocalyx muricatus
3. T. beddomei - Dimorphocalyx beddomei
4. T. bulusanensis - Dimorphocalyx bulusanensis
5. T. cumingii - Dimorphocalyx cumingii
6. T. forbesii - Wetria insignis
7. T. lawianus - Croton lawianus
8. T. macrophyllus - Paracroton pendulus
9. T. oliganthus - Cleidion papuanum
10. T. zeylanicus - Paracroton pendulus subsp. zeylanicus
