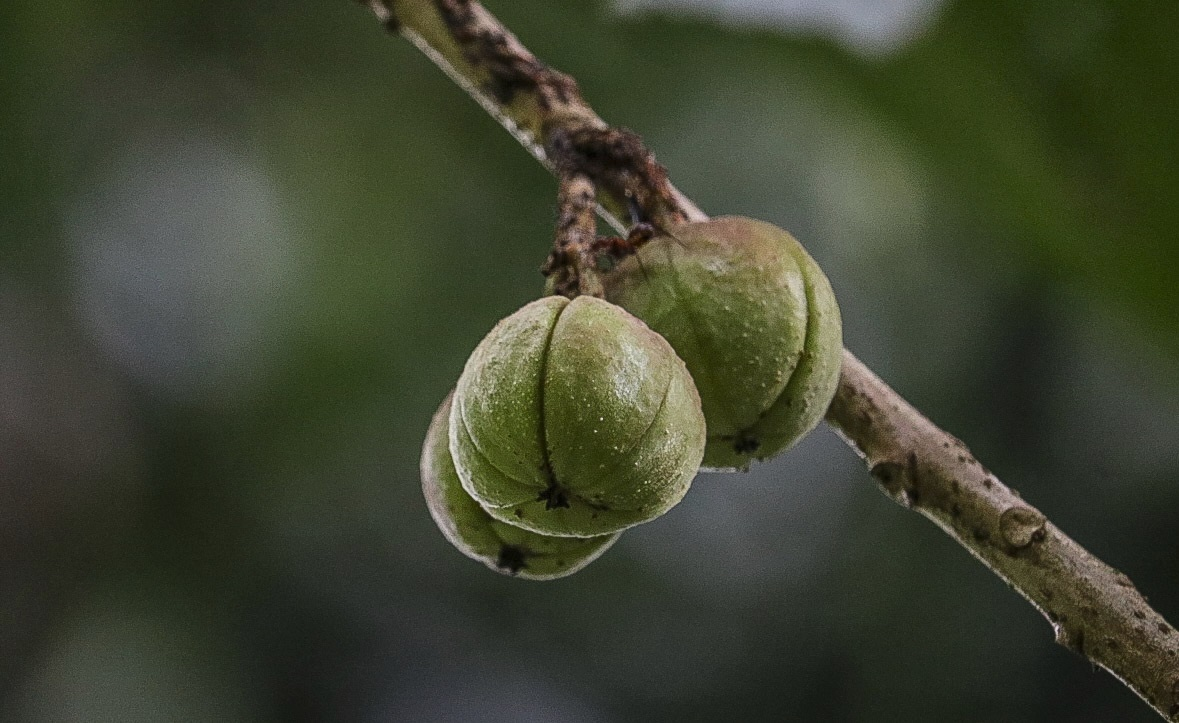
- Ostodes paniculata

Scientific classification
- Kingdom: Plantae
- Clade: Tracheophytes
- Clade: Angiosperms
- Clade: Eudicots
- Clade: Rosids
- Order: Malpighiales
- Family: Euphorbiaceae
- Subfamily: Crotonoideae
- Tribe: Codiaeae
- Genus: Ostodes; Blume

= Ostodes (plant) =

Genus of flowering plants

Ostodes is a genus of plants under the family Euphorbiaceae first described as a genus in 1826. It is native to southern China, the Himalayas, and parts of Southeast Asia.

Species

1. Ostodes kuangii Y.T.Chang - Yunnan
2. Ostodes paniculata Blume (syn O. katharinae) - Hainan, Yunnan, Tibet, Nepal, Sikkim, Bhutan, N Bangladesh, Assam, Thailand, Myanmar, W Malaysia, Borneo, Java, Sumatra

formerly included

moved to other genera: Dimorphocalyx Paracroton Tapoides Tritaxis

1. O. angustifolia - Dimorphocalyx angustifolius
2. O. collina - Paracroton pendulus
3. O. integrifolia - Paracroton integrifolius
4. O. ixoroides - Tritaxis ixoroides
5. O. macrophylla - Paracroton pendulus
6. O. minor - Paracroton zeylanicus
7. O. muricata - Tritaxis muricata
8. O. pauciflora - Tritaxis pauciflora
9. O. pendula - Paracroton pendulus
10. O. serratocrenata - Paracroton pendulus
11. O. villamilii - Tapoides villamilii
12. O. zeylanica - Paracroton pendulus subsp. zeylanicus
