= Urania poeyi =

Scientific classification
- Domain: Eukaryota
- Kingdom: Animalia
- Phylum: Arthropoda
- Class: Insecta
- Order: Lepidoptera
- Family: Uraniidae
- Genus: Urania
- Species: U. poeyi

Binomial name
- Urania poeyi (Herrich-Schäffer, 1866)

Synonyms
- Cydimon poeyi Herrich-Schäffer, 1866

Species of moth

Urania poeyi is a day-flying moth of the family Uraniidae.

== Distribution ==
Urania poeyi is found in Cuba. Unlike Urania boisduvalii, which is found throughout the island, this species is restricted to the eastern part of Cuba. However, it is occasionally found in Jamaica as a stray.

Larvae of this species feed on Omphalea triandra.
