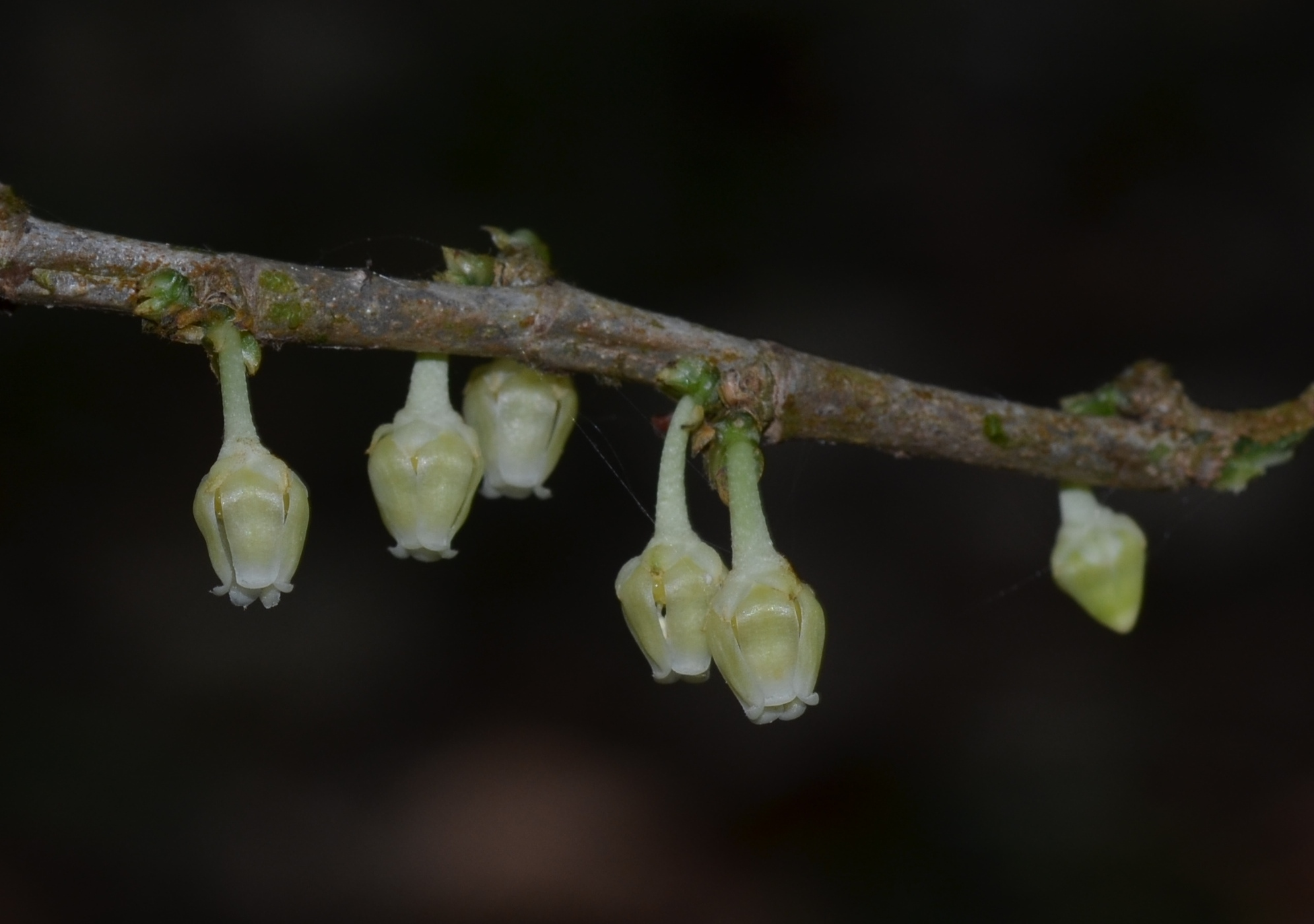

Scientific classification
- Kingdom: Plantae
- Clade: Tracheophytes
- Clade: Angiosperms
- Clade: Eudicots
- Clade: Rosids
- Order: Malpighiales
- Family: Euphorbiaceae
- Genus: Dimorphocalyx
- Species: D. glabellus
- Variety: D. g. var. lawianus

Trinomial name
- Dimorphocalyx glabellus var. lawianus (Hook.f.) Chakrab. & N.P.Balakr.

= Dimorphocalyx glabellus var. lawianus =

Variety of flowering plant

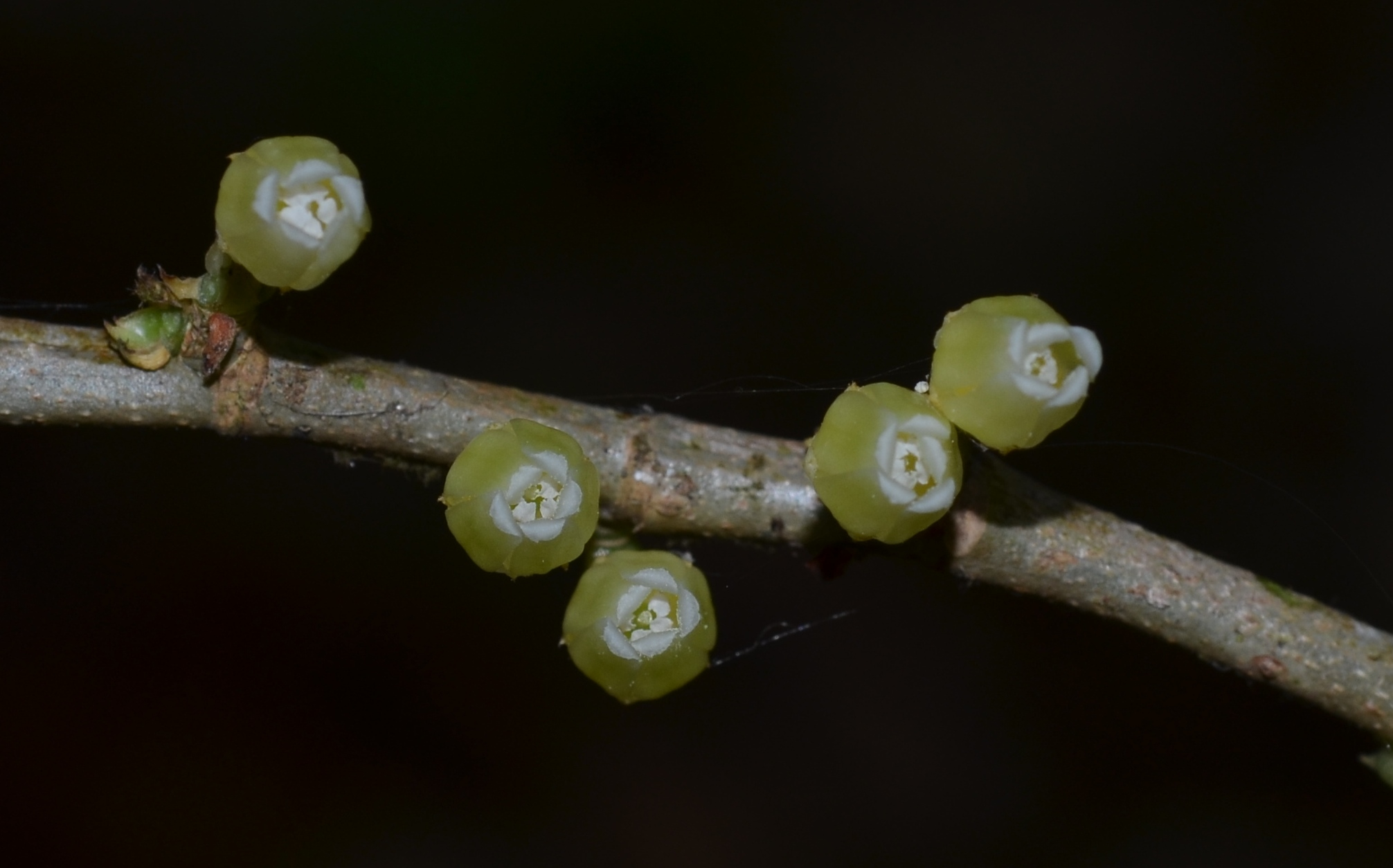

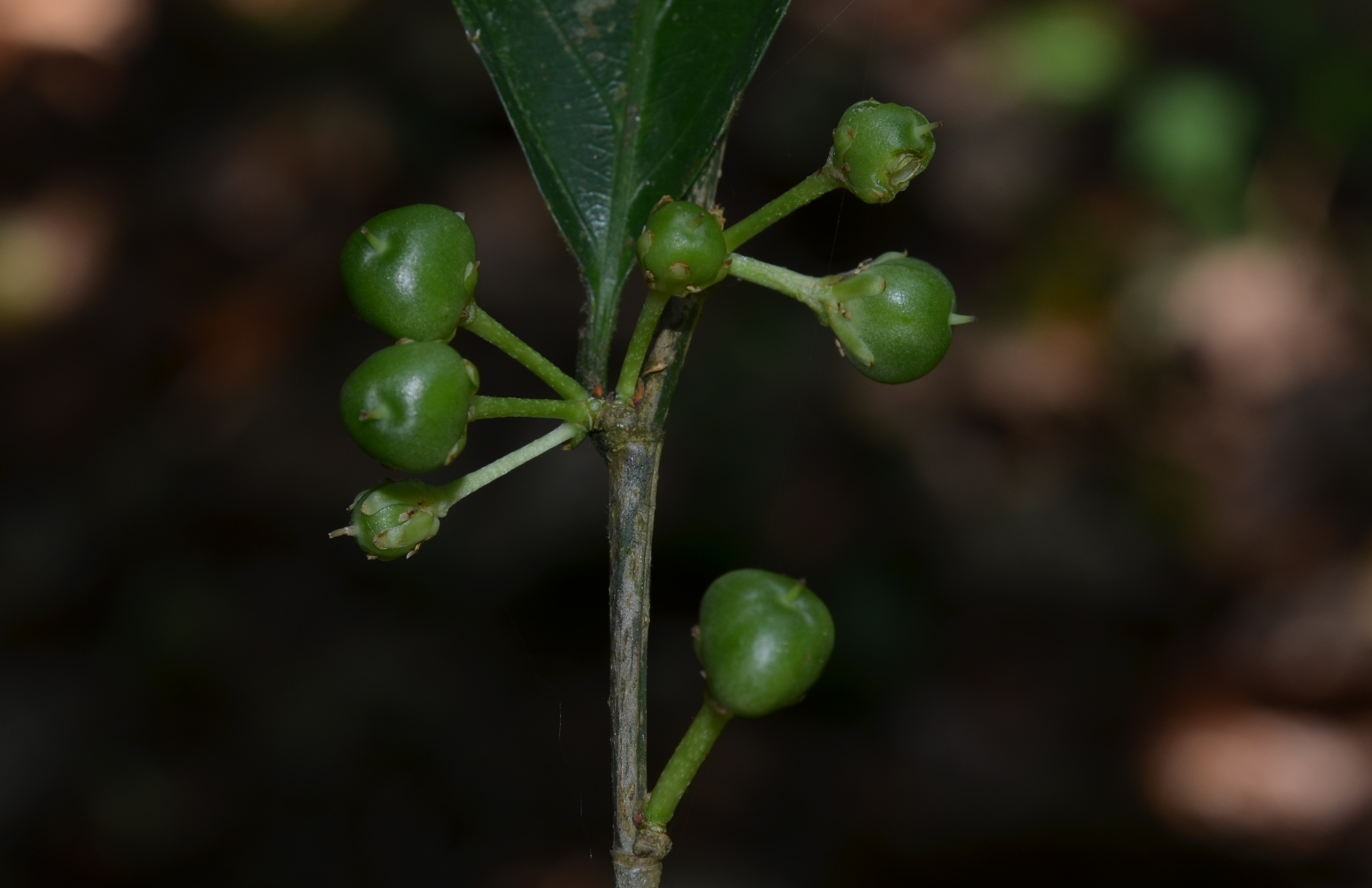

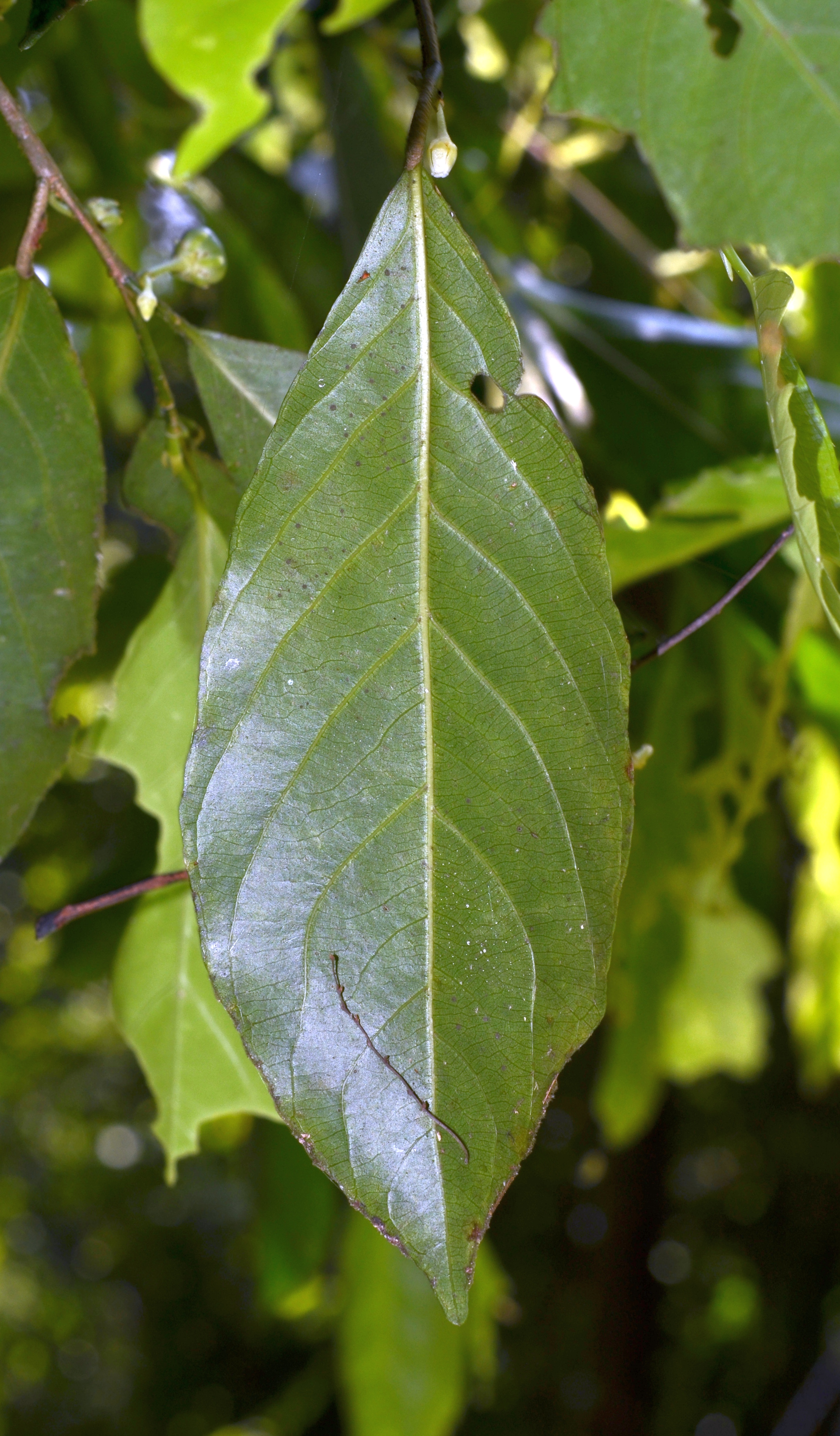

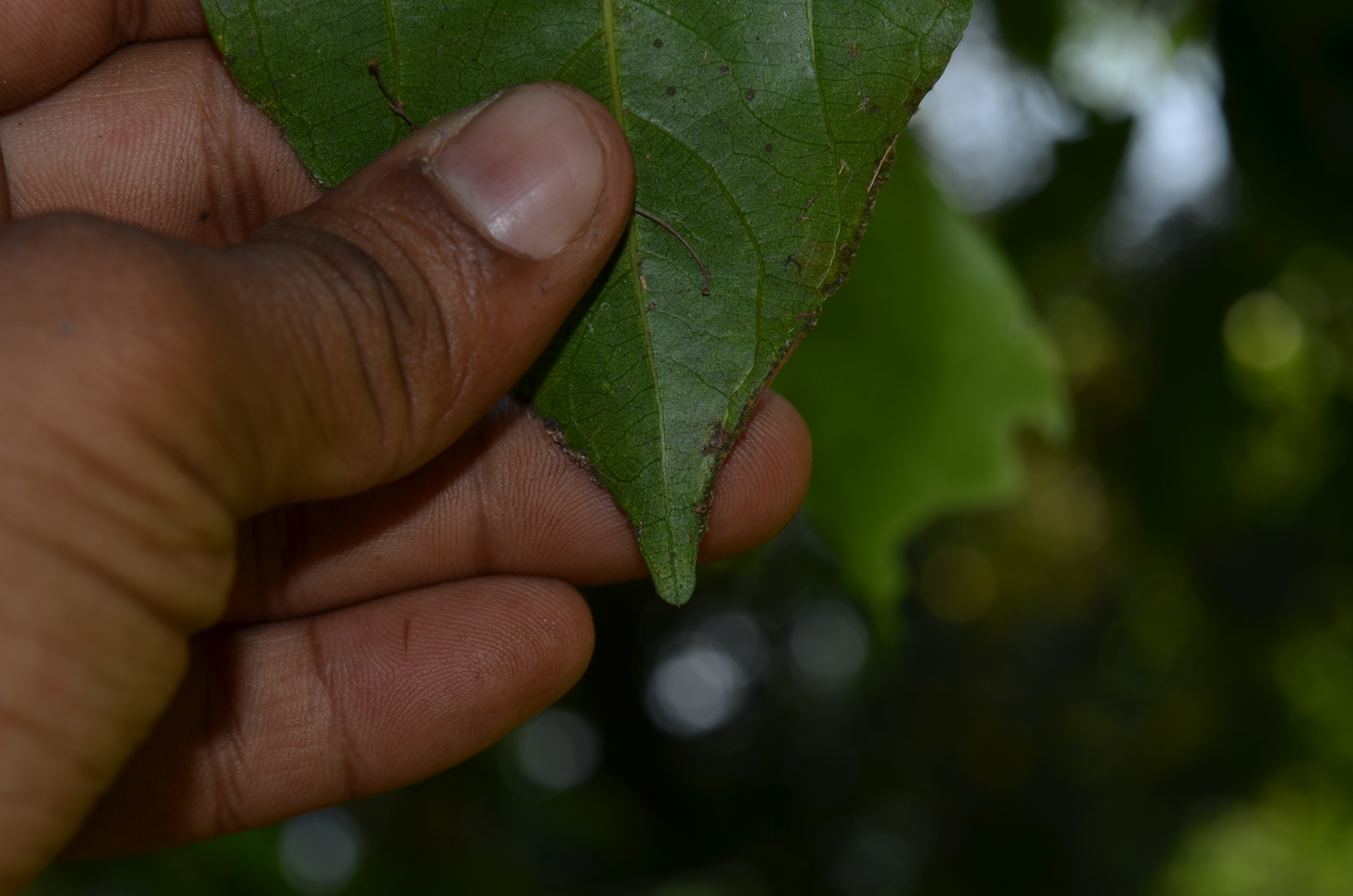

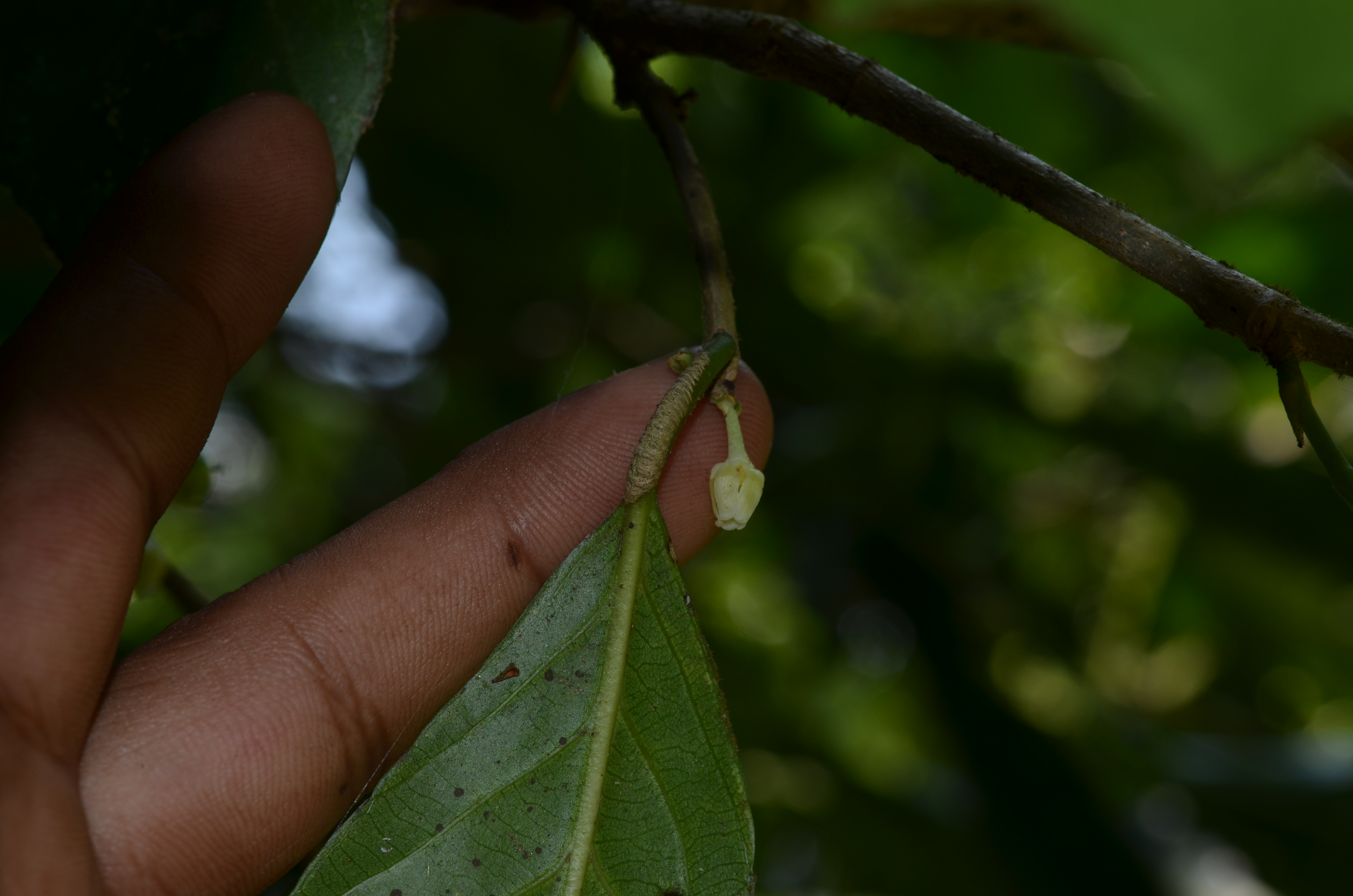

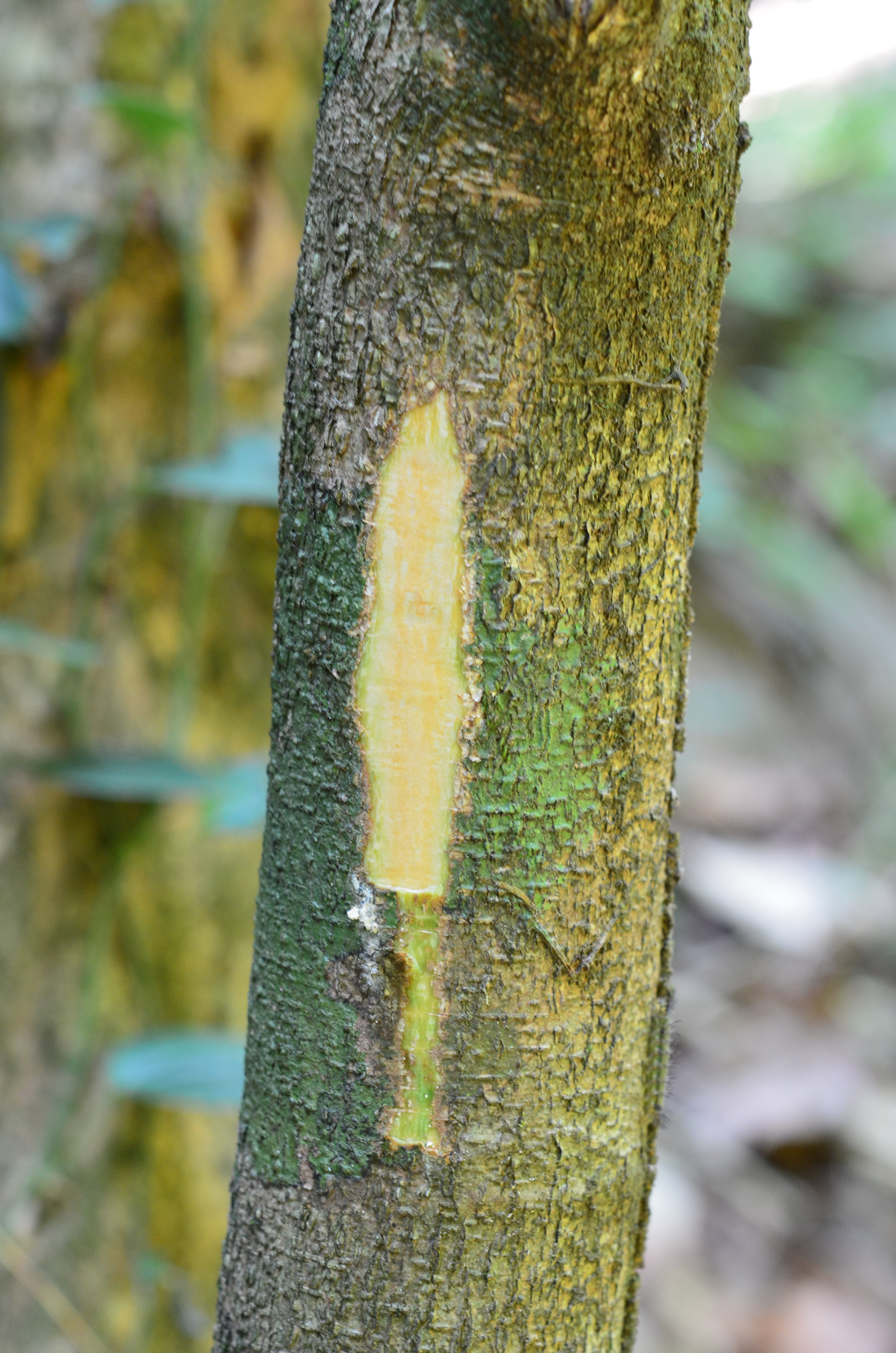

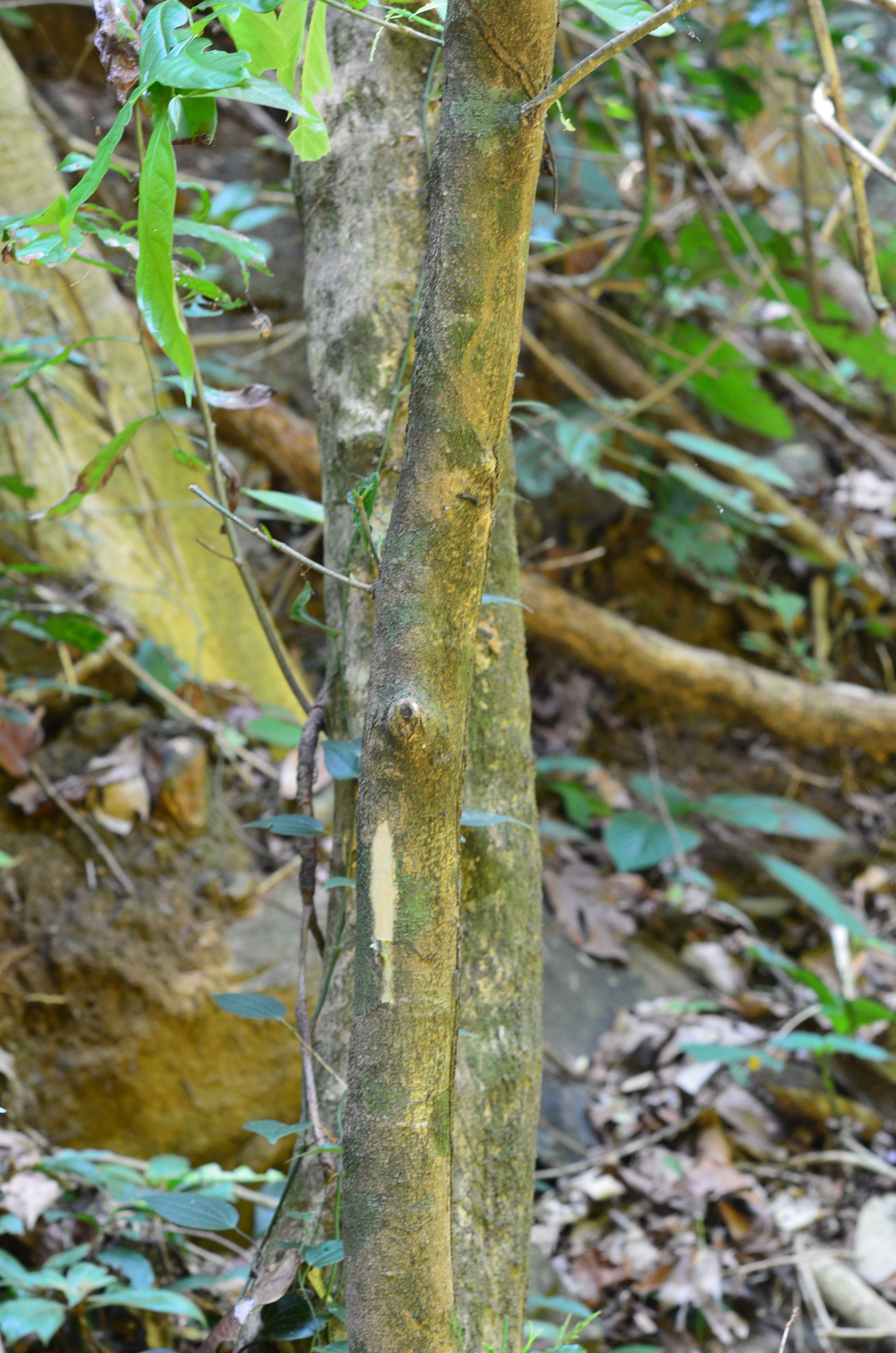

Dimorphocalyx glabellus var. lawianus (Hook.f.) Chakrab. & N.P.Balakr. is a tree endemic to South India in semi-evergreen forests.

Flowering is from February–October and fruiting is from November–January. As in all species of Dimorphocalyx, flowers are dioecious.
