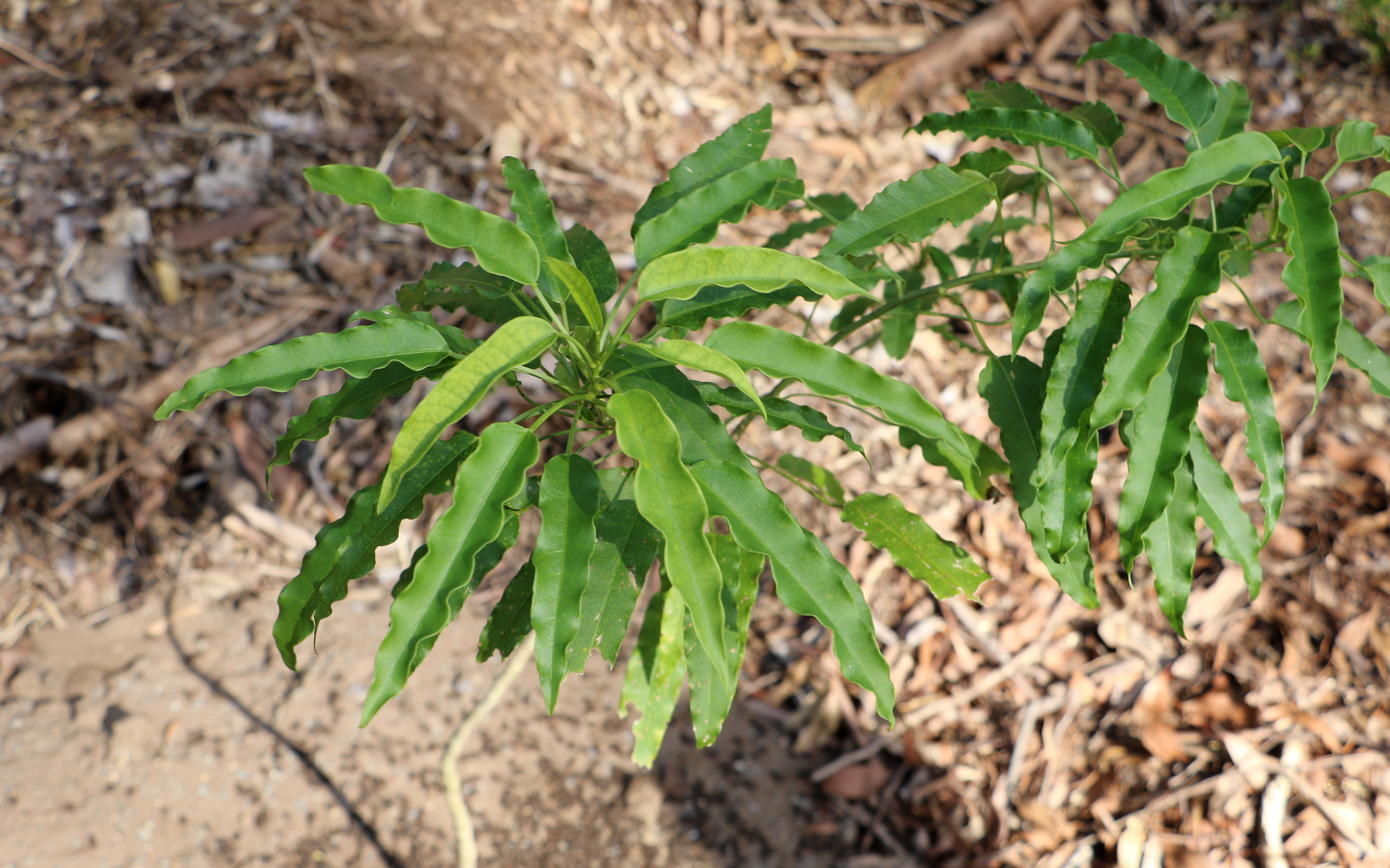

Conservation status
- Vulnerable (EPBC Act)

Scientific classification
- Kingdom: Plantae
- Clade: Tracheophytes
- Clade: Angiosperms
- Clade: Eudicots
- Clade: Rosids
- Order: Malpighiales
- Family: Euphorbiaceae
- Genus: Omphalea
- Species: O. celata

Binomial name
- Omphalea celata P.I.Forst.

= Omphalea celata =

Species of flowering plant

Omphalea celata is a rare plant species found in Queensland, Australia.

== Conservation status ==
Omphalea celata is listed as "vulnerable" under the Australian Environment Protection and Biodiversity Conservation Act 1999 and as "vulnerable" under Queensland's Nature Conservation Act 1992.
