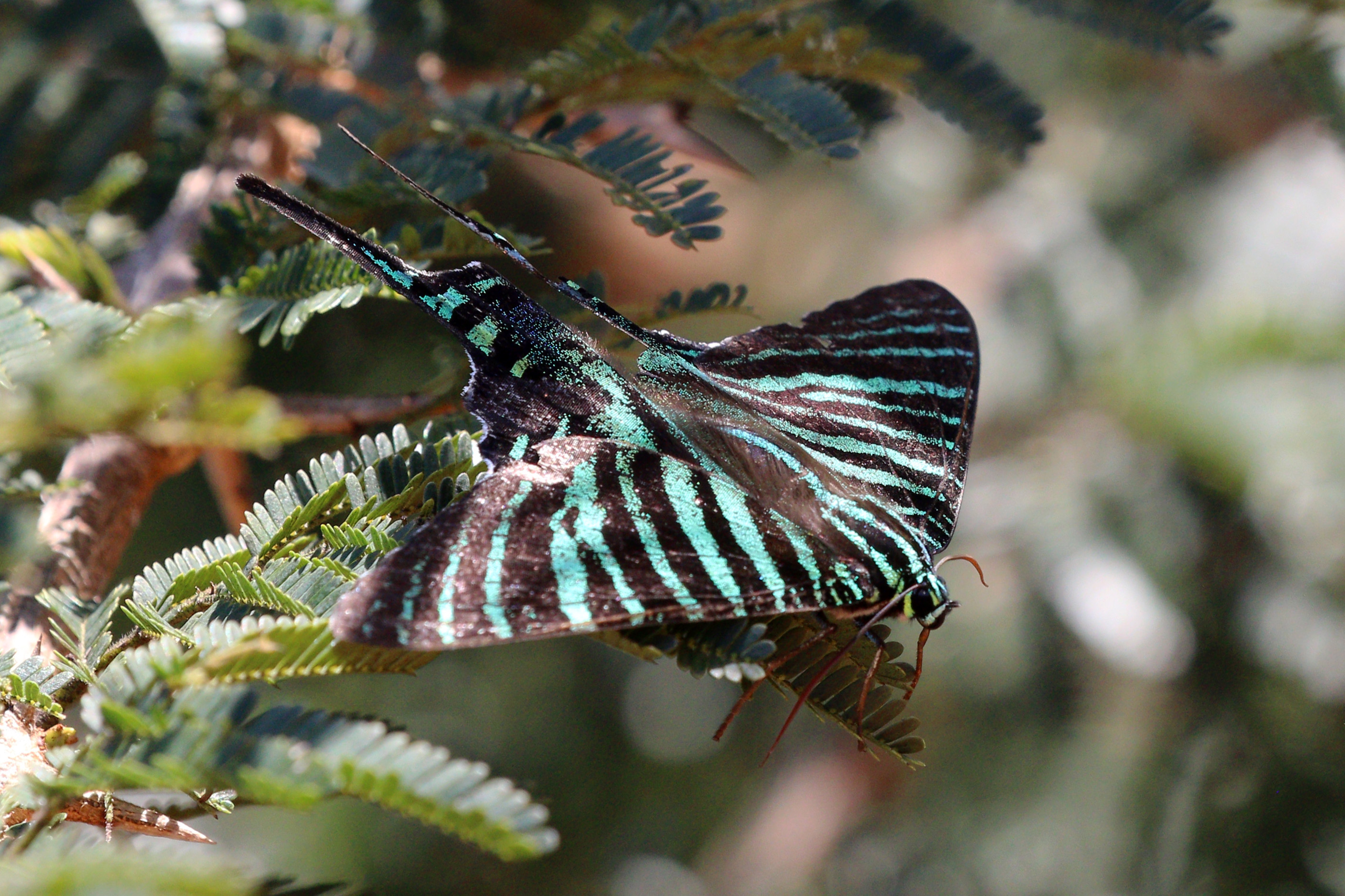

Scientific classification
- Kingdom: Animalia
- Phylum: Arthropoda
- Clade: Pancrustacea
- Class: Insecta
- Order: Lepidoptera
- Family: Uraniidae
- Genus: Urania
- Species: U. boisduvalii

Binomial name
- Urania boisduvalii Guérin-Méneville, 1829

Synonyms
- Cydimon boisduvalii; Urania fernandinae MacLeay, 1834

= Urania boisduvalii =

Species of moth

Urania boisduvalii is a day-flying moth of the family Uraniidae. It was first described by Félix Édouard Guérin-Méneville in 1829. A genetic analysis of Urania moths gave rise to a phylogenetic tree which places U. boisduvalii as sister to the in-group that includes U. fulgens spp. poeyi, U. fulgens, U. sloanus, U. sloanus, U. leilus and U. leilus spp. brasiliensis.

== Distribution ==
Urania boisduvalii is found in Cuba. Unlike Urania poeyi, which is found only in the eastern part of Cuba, this species is found throughout the island. It has been proposed that U. bosiduvalii is a migratory species. Computer generated migratory routes predict that migratory groups fly mainly along the western and eastern coast lines, because of plant distributions.

Usually, U. bosiduvalii lay individual eggs on separate leaves, but they have been known to lay egg clutches too. The specialist larvae of this species feed on Omphalea hypoleuca and Omphalea trichotoma. The larvae will feed on the leaves, but prefer the fruit of O. trichotoma. The leaves of Omaphalea spp. contain compounds that are toxic to most herbivores, but U. boisduvalli caterpillars can tolerate and metabolize the toxins. As adults, the toxins are protection against predators, like birds.
