= Trigonostemon cherrieri =

Conservation status
- Critically Endangered (IUCN 3.1)

Scientific classification
- Kingdom: Plantae
- Clade: Tracheophytes
- Clade: Angiosperms
- Clade: Eudicots
- Clade: Rosids
- Order: Malpighiales
- Family: Euphorbiaceae
- Genus: Trigonostemon
- Species: T. cherrieri

Binomial name
- Trigonostemon cherrieri Veillon

Species of flowering plant

Trigonostemon cherrieri is a species of plant in the family Euphorbiaceae. It is endemic to New Caledonia.
