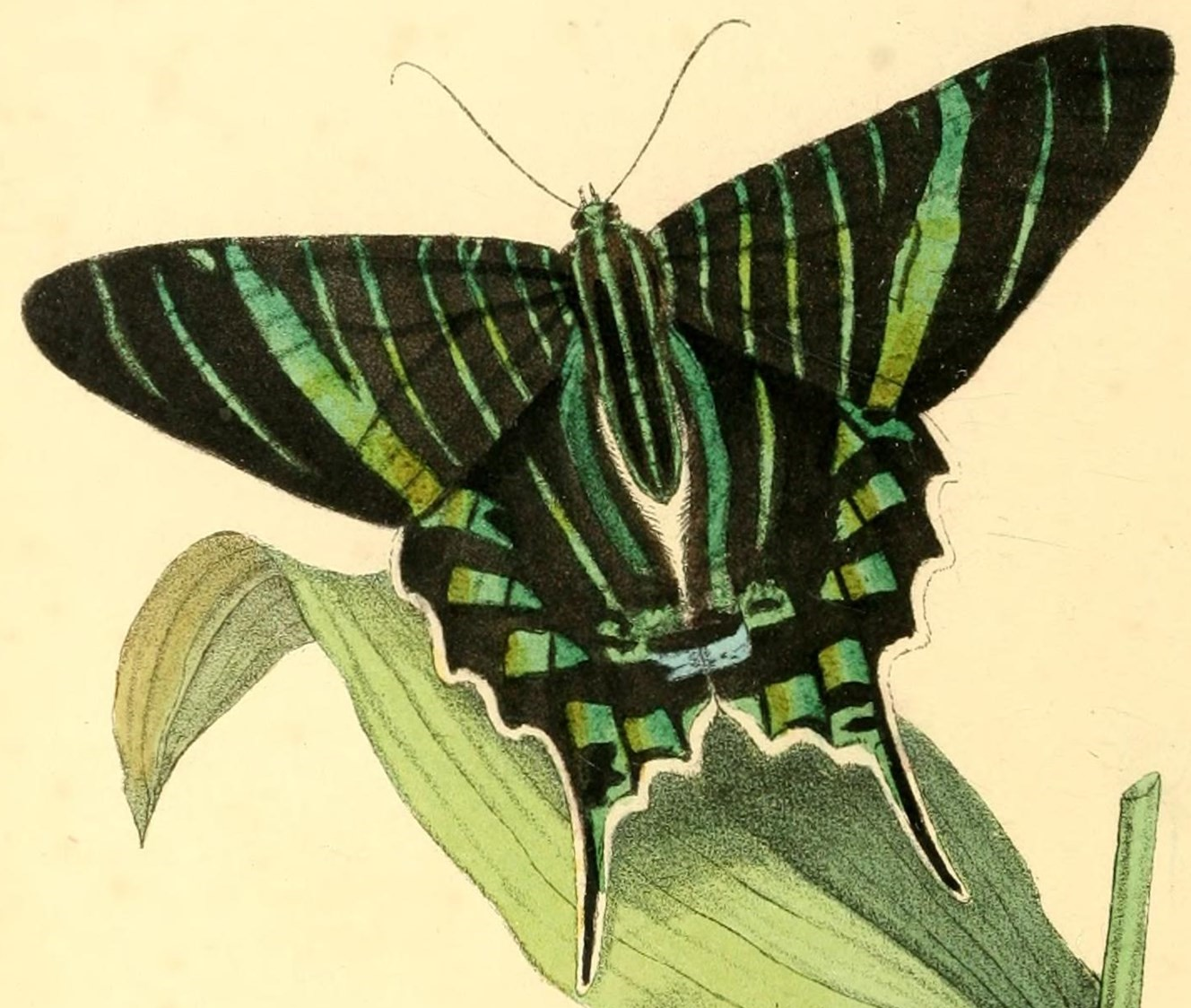

Scientific classification
- Domain: Eukaryota
- Kingdom: Animalia
- Phylum: Arthropoda
- Class: Insecta
- Order: Lepidoptera
- Family: Uraniidae
- Genus: Urania
- Species: U. brasiliensis

Binomial name
- Urania brasiliensis (Swainson, 1833)

Synonyms
- Leilus brasiliensis Swainson, 1833

= Urania brasiliensis =

Species of moth

Urania brasiliensis is a day-flying moth of the family Uraniidae first described by William Swainson in 1833.

== Distribution ==
Urania brasiliensis is found in the Atlantic forest of Brazil. It is one of the two species of genus Urania found in that country.
