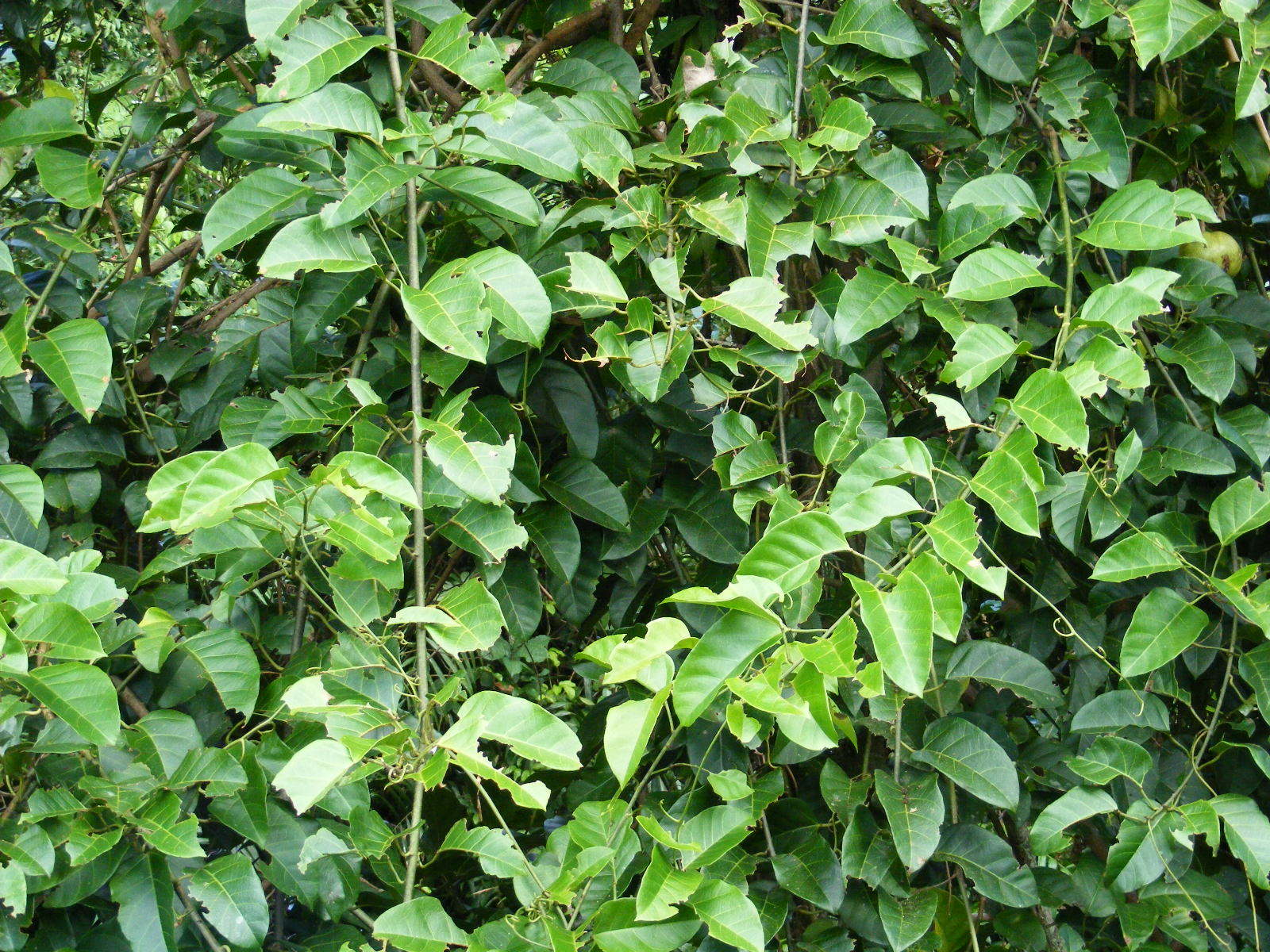

Scientific classification
- Kingdom: Plantae
- Clade: Tracheophytes
- Clade: Angiosperms
- Clade: Eudicots
- Clade: Rosids
- Order: Malpighiales
- Family: Euphorbiaceae
- Genus: Omphalea
- Species: O. queenslandiae

Binomial name
- Omphalea queenslandiae F.M.Bailey

= Omphalea queenslandiae =

Species of plant

Omphalea queenslandiae is a liana in the spurge family. It is native to north-eastern Australia.

== Description ==
The species grows as a woody vine on rainforest trees. Its stem has a diameter of up to 15 cm and exudes a red sap when cut. The leaves are 12–22 cm long by 6.5–12 cm wide. The flowers have fleshy tepals, concave on the inner surface; the female flowers are 5–10 mm in diameter; the male flowers are smaller, about 2 mm long. The fleshy fruits grow up to about 8 by 12.5 cm in size and contain round seeds 3.5–4 cm in diameter.

== Distribution and habitat ==
The species is endemic to the Wet Tropics of Queensland where it occurs in lowland and upland rainforest from sea level to an elevation of 750 m.
