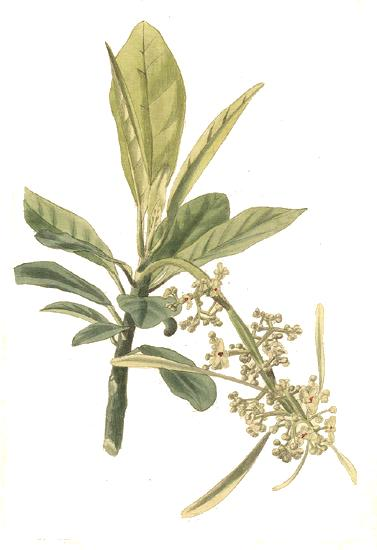
- Omphalea triandra

Scientific classification
- Kingdom: Plantae
- Clade: Tracheophytes
- Clade: Angiosperms
- Clade: Eudicots
- Clade: Rosids
- Order: Malpighiales
- Family: Euphorbiaceae
- Subfamily: Acalyphoideae
- Tribe: Omphaleae
- Genus: Omphalea; L.

Synonyms
- Omphalandria P.Browne, rejected name; Duchola Adans.; Ronnowia Buchoz; Hecatea Thouars; Hecaterium Kunze ex Rchb.; Hebecocca Beurl.; Neomphalea Pax & K.Hoffm.

= Omphalea =

Genus of flowering plants

Distribution of the four Madagascan species of Omphalea

Omphalea is a plant genus of the family Euphorbiaceae first described as a genus in 1759. It is native to tropical parts of the Americas, the West Indies, Asia, Australia, and Africa (including Madagascar).

Omphalea has monoecious, apetalous flowers and fleshy fruits with hard centers.

== Ecology ==
The plants are toxic and few animals can eat them. Diurnal moths of the subfamily Uraniinae feed on them. These moths are species of the genus Urania in the Americas, and of the genus Chrysiridia in Africa.

The only species from mainland Africa is O. mansfeldiana, a liana from Tanzania. The Madagascan species are O. ankaranensis, a shrub from the limestone karst of northern Madagascar, O. palmata Leandri, a dry forest shrub closely related to O. ankaranensis but from western Madagascar, O. occidentalis Leandri, also a dry forest species of western Madagascar, and O. oppositifilia (Willdenow), a tree from the east coast rainforest of Madagascar.

The Madagascan sunset moth (Chrysiridia rhipheus) feeds on all four of these species.

Species

1. Omphalea ankaranensis - N Madagascar
2. Omphalea bracteata - Indochina, Malaysia, Borneo, Philippines
3. Omphalea brasiliensis - Bahia
4. Omphalea celata - Queensland
5. Omphalea commutata - Haiti incl Gonâve Island
6. Omphalea diandra - Central + South America, West Indies
7. Omphalea ekmanii - Dominican Rep
8. Omphalea grandifolia - Philippines
9. Omphalea hypoleuca - W Cuba
10. Omphalea malayana - Pulao Tioman, Sarawak, Luzon
11. Omphalea mansfeldiana - Tanzania
12. Omphalea megacarpa - Grenada, Trinidad, Tobago
13. Omphalea occidentalis - W Madagascar
14. Omphalea oleifera - Mexico, Central America
15. Omphalea oppositifolia - E Madagascar
16. Omphalea palmata - WC Madagascar
17. Omphalea papuana - Queensland, Papuasia
18. Omphalea queenslandiae - Queensland
19. Omphalea sargentii - Indonesia, Malaysia, Philippines
20. Omphalea triandra - Jamaica, Haiti
21. Omphalea trichotoma - Cuba

formerly included

moved to other genera (Mabea Phyllanthus Sapium Sebastiania Senefeldera )

1. O. axillaris - Phyllanthus axillaris
2. O. cauliflora - Phyllanthus cauliflorus
3. O. eglandulata - Sebastiania eglandulata
4. O. epistylium - Phyllanthus axillaris
5. O. glandulata - Sapium glandulosum
6. O. lactescens - Mabea piriri
7. O. verticillata - Senefeldera verticillata
