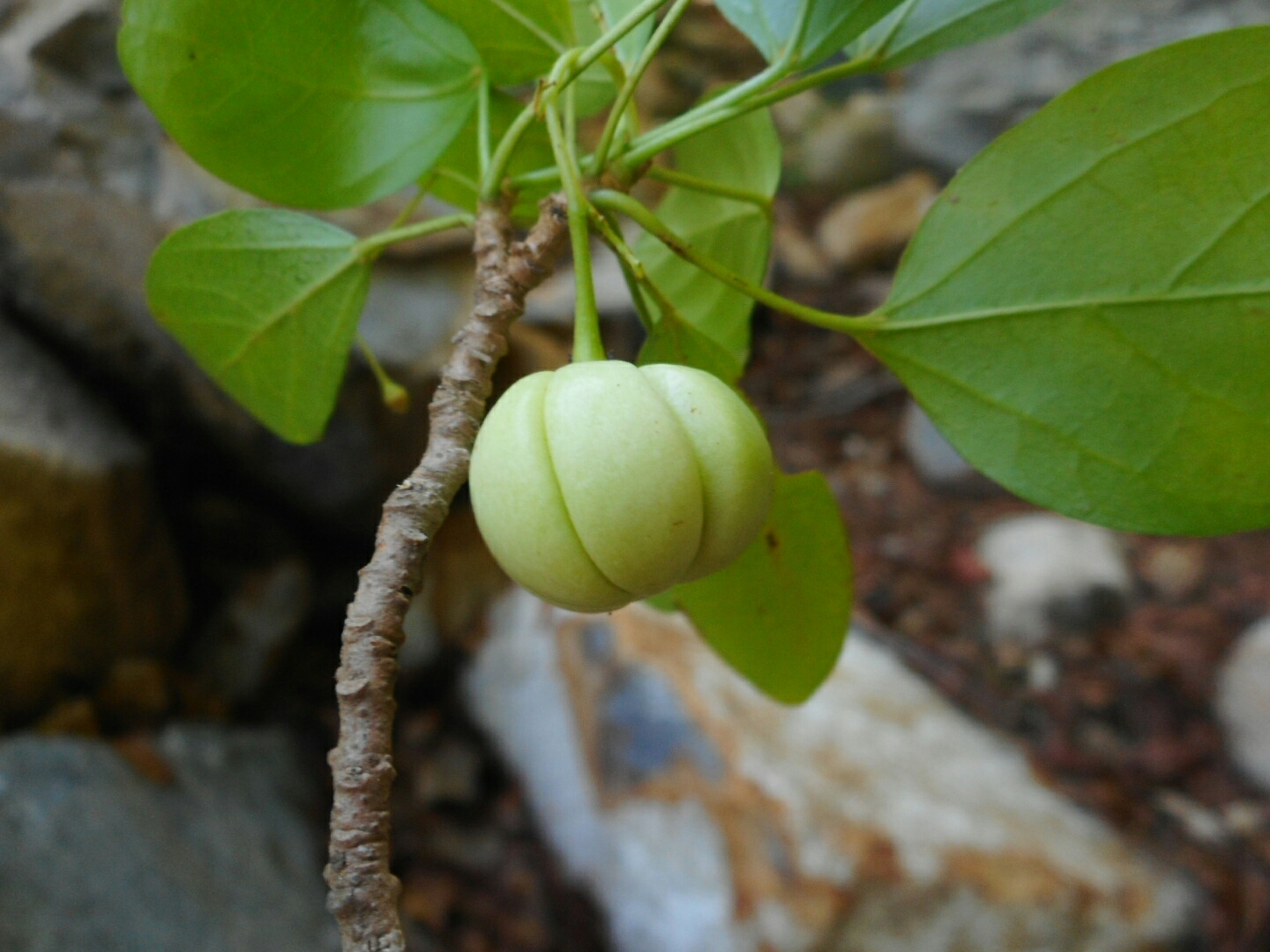

Conservation status
- Vulnerable (IUCN 2.3)

Scientific classification
- Kingdom: Plantae
- Clade: Tracheophytes
- Clade: Angiosperms
- Clade: Eudicots
- Clade: Rosids
- Order: Malpighiales
- Family: Euphorbiaceae
- Genus: Trigonostemon
- Species: T. fragilis

Binomial name
- Trigonostemon fragilis (Gagnep.) Airy-Shaw

Synonyms
- Poilaniella fragilis Gagnep.

= Trigonostemon fragilis =

Species of flowering plant

Trigonostemon fragilis is a species of a plant in the family Euphorbiaceae. It is endemic to Vietnam.
