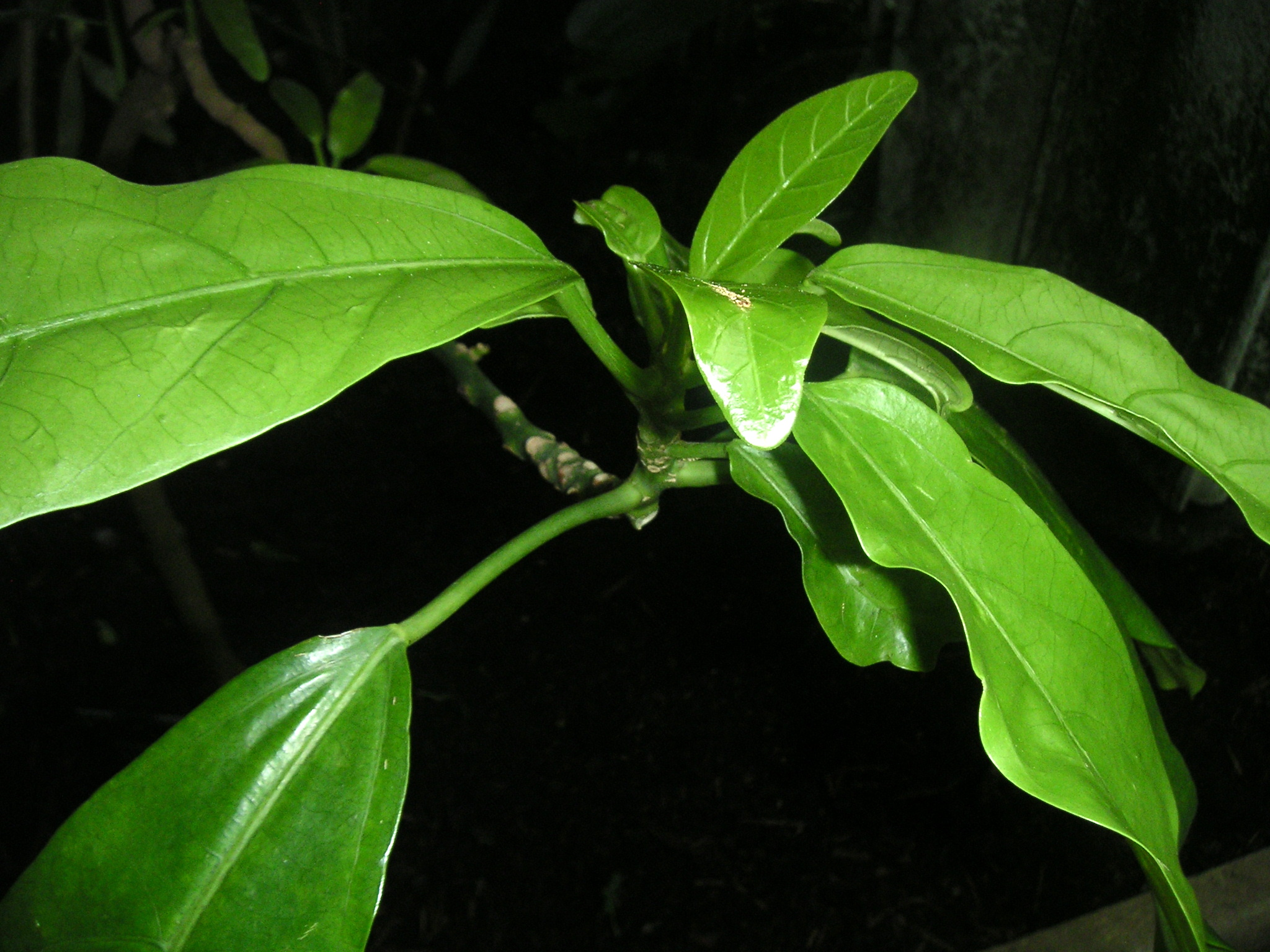

Scientific classification
- Kingdom: Plantae
- Clade: Embryophytes
- Clade: Tracheophytes
- Clade: Angiosperms
- Clade: Eudicots
- Clade: Rosids
- Order: Malpighiales
- Family: Euphorbiaceae
- Genus: Omphalea
- Species: O. triandra

Binomial name
- Omphalea triandra L.

= Omphalea triandra =

Species of flowering plant

Omphalea triandra, also known as Jamaican cobnut and pop nut, is a plant species endemic to Jamaica and Haiti.

Larvae of certain species of moths of the genus Urania feed on the leaves of Omphalea triandra.
