= Trigonostemon rufescens =

Conservation status
- Conservation Dependent (IUCN 2.3)

Scientific classification
- Kingdom: Plantae
- Clade: Tracheophytes
- Clade: Angiosperms
- Clade: Eudicots
- Clade: Rosids
- Order: Malpighiales
- Family: Euphorbiaceae
- Genus: Trigonostemon
- Species: T. rufescens

Binomial name
- Trigonostemon rufescens Jabl.

Species of flowering plant

Trigonostemon rufescens is a species of plant in the family Euphorbiaceae. It is endemic to Peninsular Malaysia.
