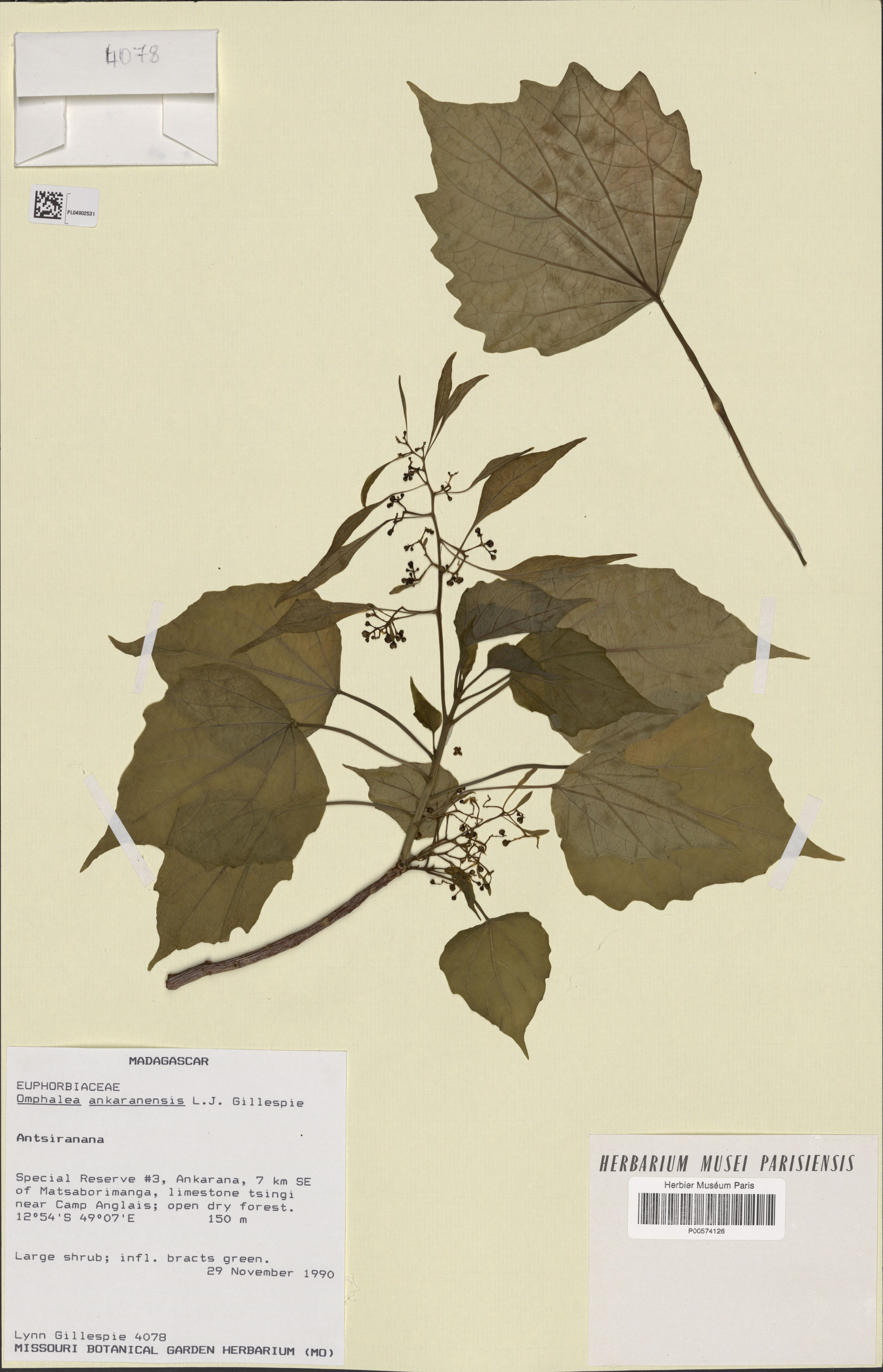
- Specimen at National Museum of Natural History, France

Scientific classification
- Kingdom: Plantae
- Clade: Tracheophytes
- Clade: Angiosperms
- Clade: Eudicots
- Clade: Rosids
- Order: Malpighiales
- Family: Euphorbiaceae
- Genus: Omphalea
- Species: O. ankaranensis

Binomial name
- Omphalea ankaranensis L.J. Gillespie

= Omphalea ankaranensis =

Species of flowering plant

Omphalea ankaranensis is a plant species endemic to a small region in northern Madagascar. Type locale is in Antsiranana Province, inside Réserve Speciale Ankarana, 7 km SE of Matsaborimanga. Plant grows on limestone soils.

Omphalea ankaranensis is a tree up to 7 m tall. Leaves are heart-shaped, up to 16 cm long. Inflorescence is a racemous thyrse.
