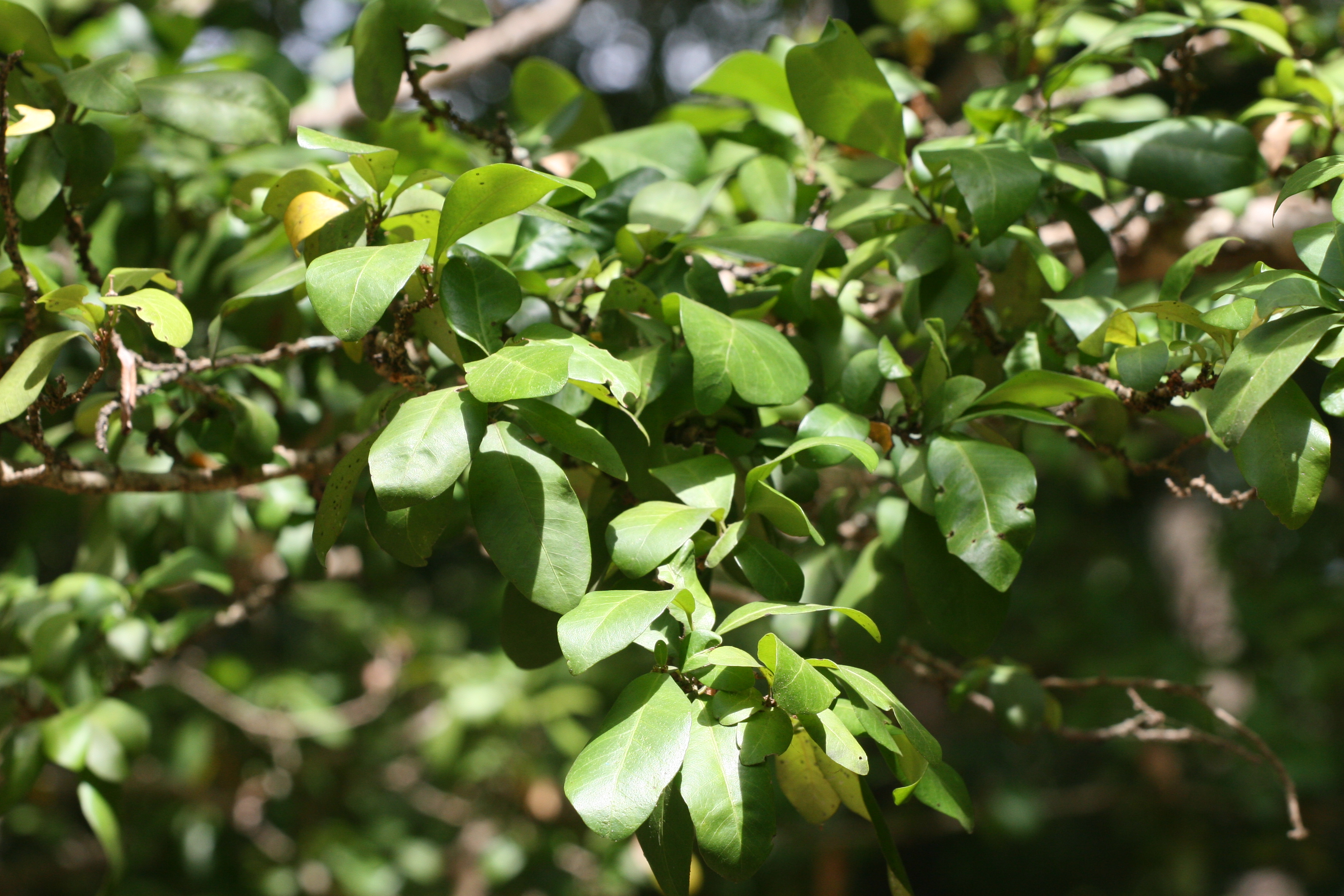

Scientific classification
- Kingdom: Plantae
- Clade: Tracheophytes
- Clade: Angiosperms
- Clade: Eudicots
- Clade: Rosids
- Order: Malpighiales
- Family: Euphorbiaceae
- Genus: Dimorphocalyx
- Species: D. glabellus

Binomial name
- Dimorphocalyx glabellus (Thwaites

Varieties
- Dimorphocalyx glabellus var. lawianus (Hook.f.) Chakrab. & N.P.Balakr.

= Tritaxis glabella =

Species of flowering plant

Dimorphocalyx glabellus is a species of plant in the family Euphorbiaceae. It is a small evergreen tree endemic to Sri Lanka.

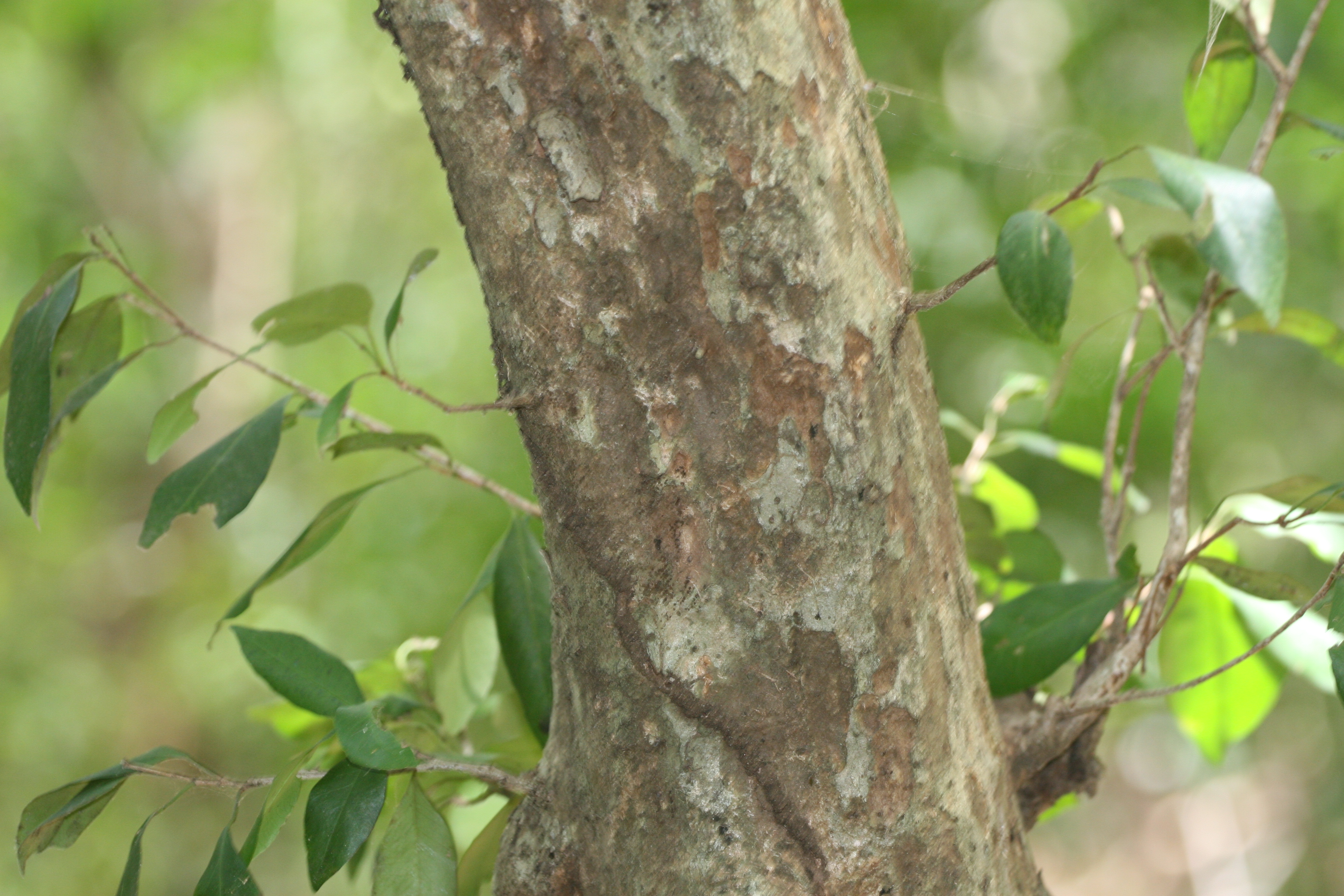
Stem

== In culture ==
It is known as "weli wenna" in Sinhala and "tentukki" in Tamil.

== Uses ==
Whole plant is used as an important medicinal plant in Ayurveda.
