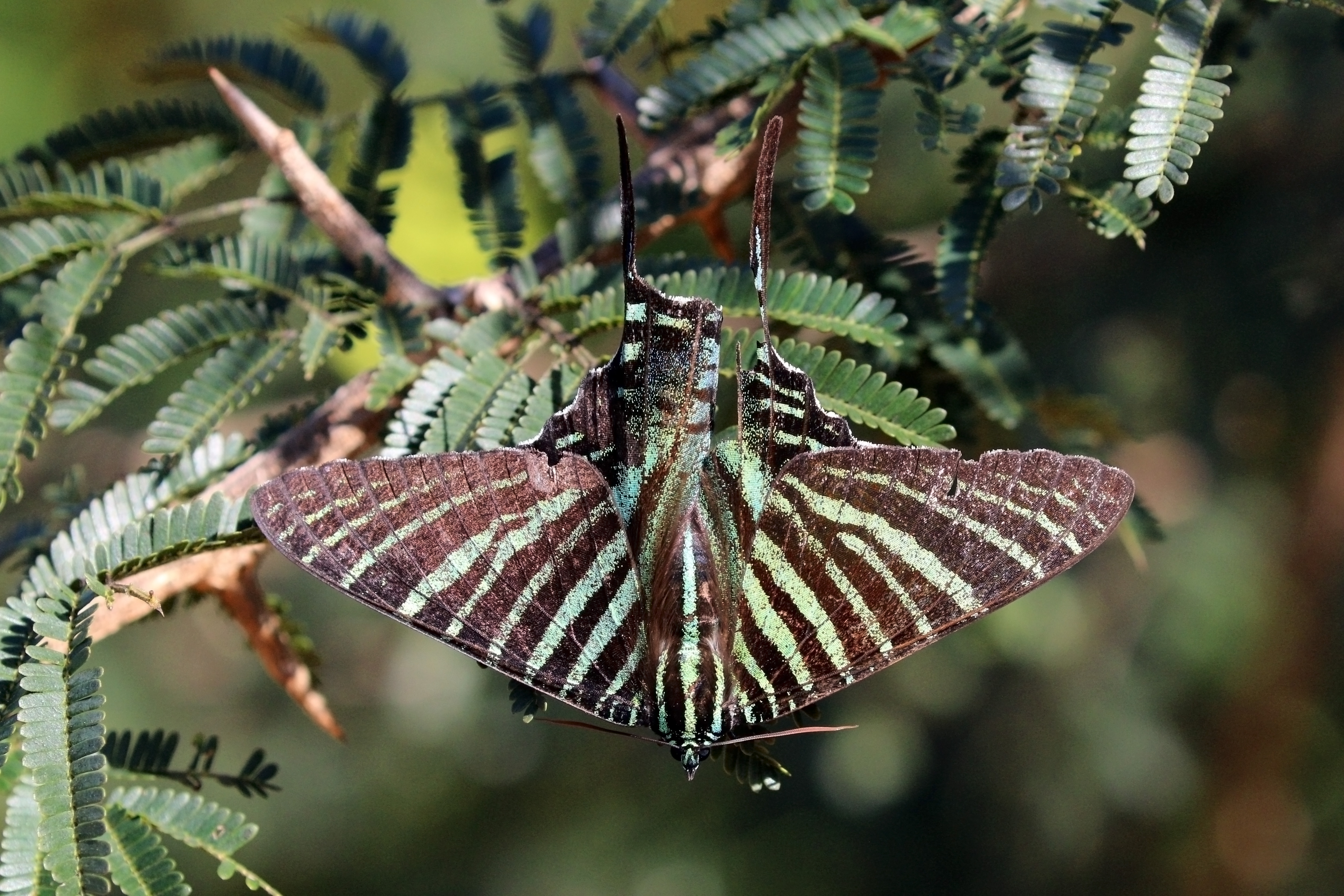
- Urania boisduvalii, Cuba

Scientific classification
- Kingdom: Animalia
- Phylum: Arthropoda
- Clade: Pancrustacea
- Class: Insecta
- Order: Lepidoptera
- Family: Uraniidae
- Subfamily: Uraniinae
- Genus: Urania; Fabricius, 1807

Synonyms
- Urania Illiger, 1807; Lars Hübner, 1807; Cydrus Billberg, 1820; Cydimon Dalman, 1825; Leilus Swainson, 1833; Dasycephalus Walker, 1854; Uranidia Westwood, 1879

= Urania (moth) =

Genus of moths

Urania is a genus of colorful, dayflying moths in the family Uraniidae, native to warmer parts of the Americas. Their larvae feed on Omphalea.

The genus name Urania is Neo-Latin from Latin Urania from Ancient Greek Ουρανία, one of the Muses, literally 'The Heavenly One'.

== Distribution ==
The genus includes relatively large day-flying moths that are found in Mexico (rarely reaching north to Texas as a vagrant), Central America, warmer parts of South America and the Caribbean islands.

== Species ==
- Urania boisduvalii Guérin-Meneville, 1829 – (Cuba)
- Urania brasiliensis Swainson, 1833 – (eastern Brazil)
- Urania leilus Linnaeus, 1758 – green-banded urania (tropical South America east of the Andes)
- Urania fulgens Walker, 1854 – urania swallowtail moth (Mexico, through Central America to northwestern South America)
- Urania poeyi Herrich-Schäffer, 1866 – (eastern Cuba)
- Urania sloanus Cramer, 1779 – Sloane's urania (Jamaica; extinct c. 1894)

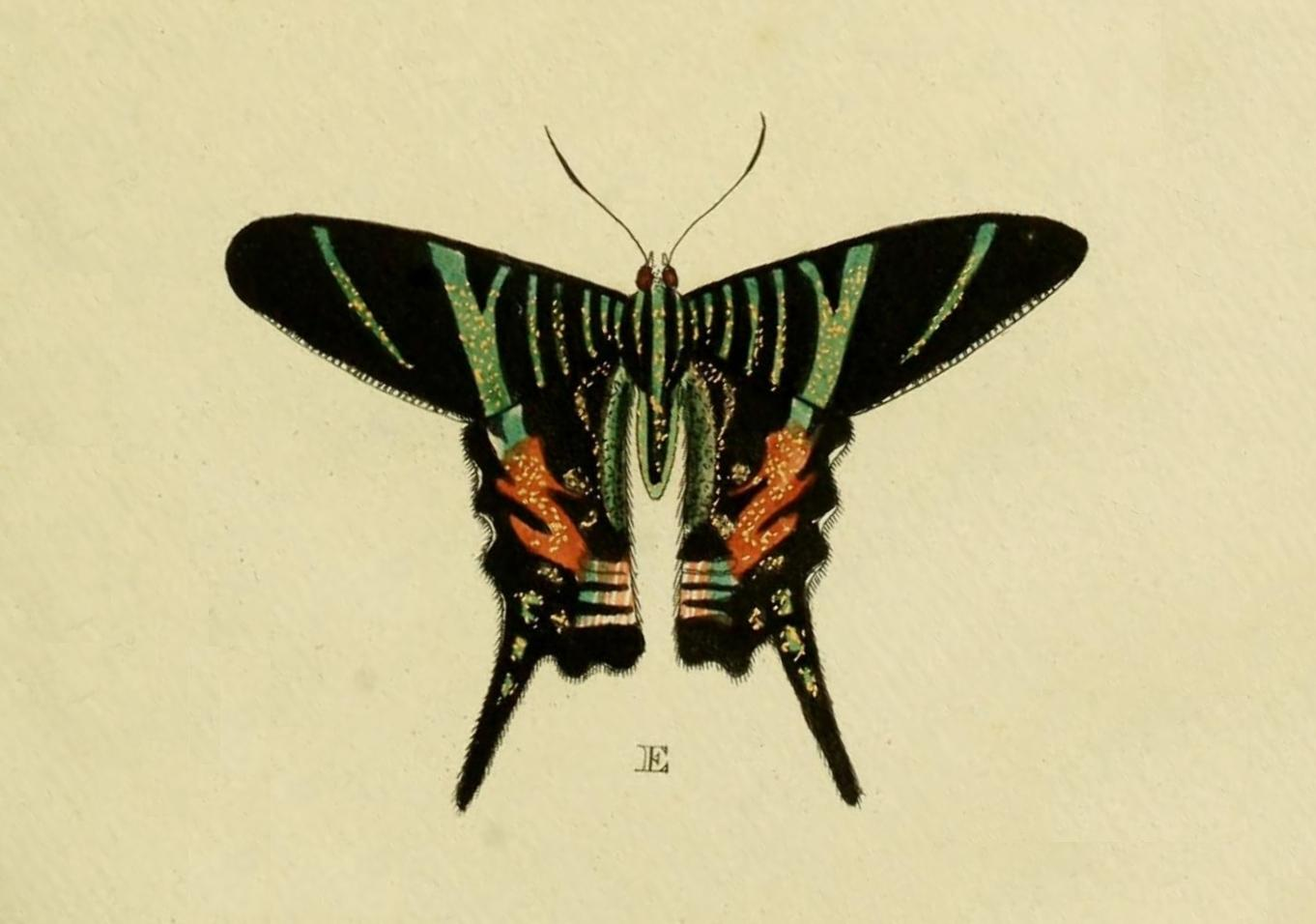
Illustration of the now extinct Urania sloanus in Pieter Cramer and Caspar Stoll's De uitlandsche kapellen: voorkomende in de drie waereld-deelen Asia, Africa en America
