= Paracroton zeylanicus =

Conservation status
- Critically Endangered (IUCN 2.3)

Scientific classification
- Kingdom: Plantae
- Clade: Tracheophytes
- Clade: Angiosperms
- Clade: Eudicots
- Clade: Rosids
- Order: Malpighiales
- Family: Euphorbiaceae
- Genus: Paracroton
- Species: P. zeylanicus

Binomial name
- Paracroton zeylanicus (Müll.Arg.) N.P.Balakr. & Chakrab.

Synonyms
- Desmostemon zeylanicus var. minor Thwaites; Fahrenheitia minor (Thwaites) Airy Shaw; Ostodes minor (Thwaites) Müll.Arg.; Ostodes zeylanica var. minor (Thwaites) Bedd.; Triaxis zeylanicus Müll. Arg.; Tritaxis zeylanica Müll. Arg.

Species of flowering plant

Paracroton zeylanicus is a species of flowering plant in the family Euphorbiaceae that is endemic to south-western parts of Sri Lanka. It was first found from a Hinidumkanda Biosphere Reserve, but rapidly declined due to deforestation and other anthropogenic activities. The plant is listed as a critically endangered by IUCN.
