= Omphalea malayana =

Scientific classification
- Kingdom: Plantae
- Clade: Tracheophytes
- Clade: Angiosperms
- Clade: Eudicots
- Clade: Rosids
- Order: Malpighiales
- Family: Euphorbiaceae
- Genus: Omphalea
- Species: O. malayana

Binomial name
- Omphalea malayana Merr.

Synonyms
- Trigonostemon arboreus Ridl.

Species of plant

Omphalea malayana is a species of flowering plant in the family Euphorbiaceae, native to Peninsular Malaysia (Pulao Tioman), Borneo (Sarawak) and the Philippines (Luzon). It was first described by Elmer Drew Merrill in 1916.

== Conservation ==
Trigonostemon arboreus was assessed as "vulnerable" in the 1998 IUCN Red List, where it is said to be native only to Peninsular Malaysia. As of February 2023, T. arboreus was regarded as a synonym of Omphalea malayana, which has a wider distribution.
