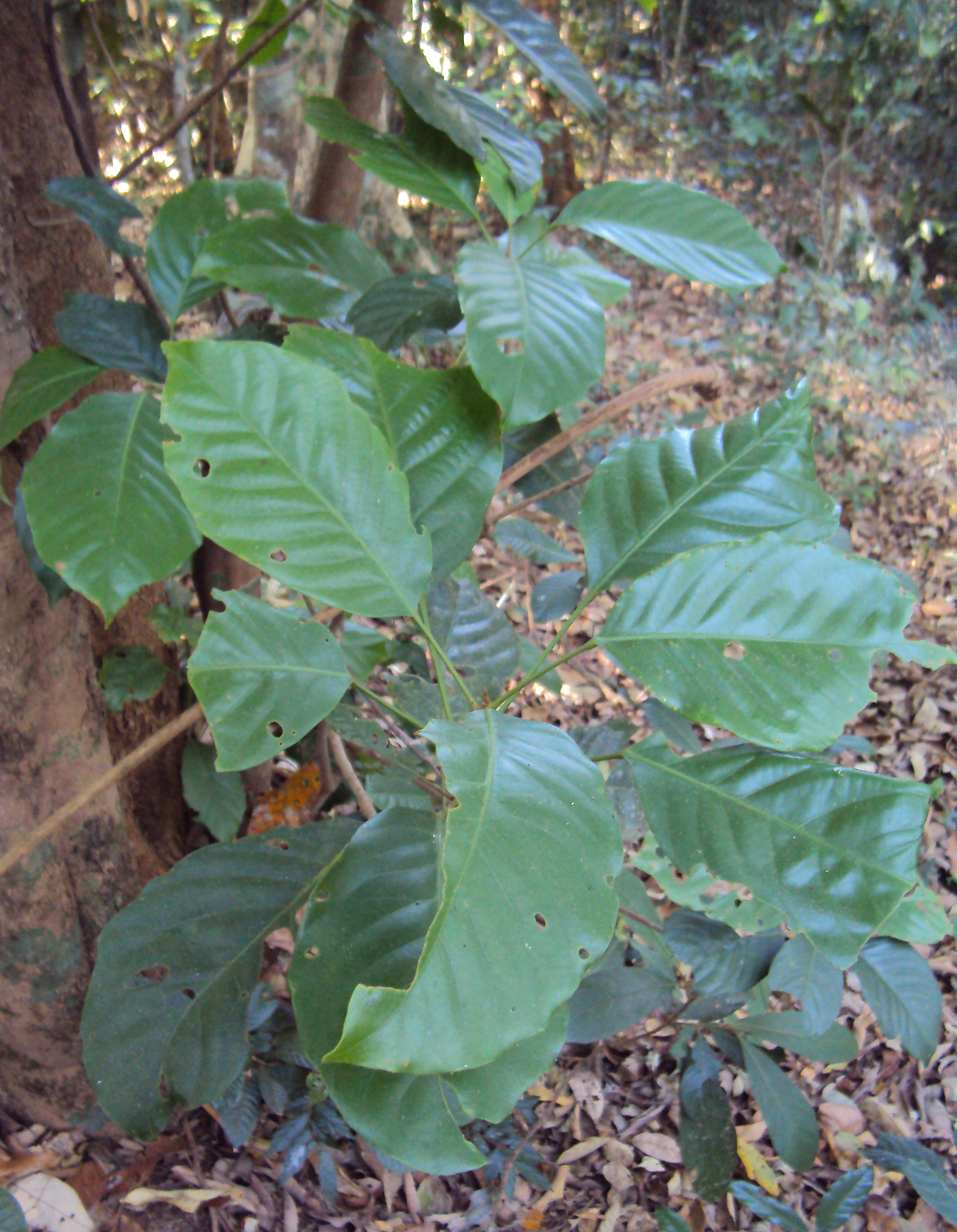

Scientific classification
- Kingdom: Plantae
- Clade: Tracheophytes
- Clade: Angiosperms
- Clade: Eudicots
- Clade: Rosids
- Order: Malpighiales
- Family: Euphorbiaceae
- Subfamily: Crotonoideae
- Tribe: Crotoneae
- Genus: Paracroton; Miq.

Synonyms
- Desmostemon Thwaites; Fahrenheitia Rchb. & Zoll. ex Müll.Arg.

= Paracroton =

Genus of flowering plants

Paracroton is a genus of flowering plants in the Euphorbiaceae first described as a genus in 1859. It is native to South and Southeast Asia, as well as New Guinea.

Species

1. Paracroton integrifolius (Airy Shaw) N.P.Balakr. & Chakr. - Kerala, Tamil Nadu
2. Paracroton pendulus (Hassk.) Miq. - India, Sri Lanka, Myanmar, Thailand, Malaysia, Borneo, Sumatra, Philippines
3. Paracroton sterrhopodus (Airy Shaw) Radcl.-Sm. & Govaerts - W New Guinea
4. Paracroton zeylanicus (Müll.Arg.) N.P.Balakr. & Chakr. - Sri Lanka
