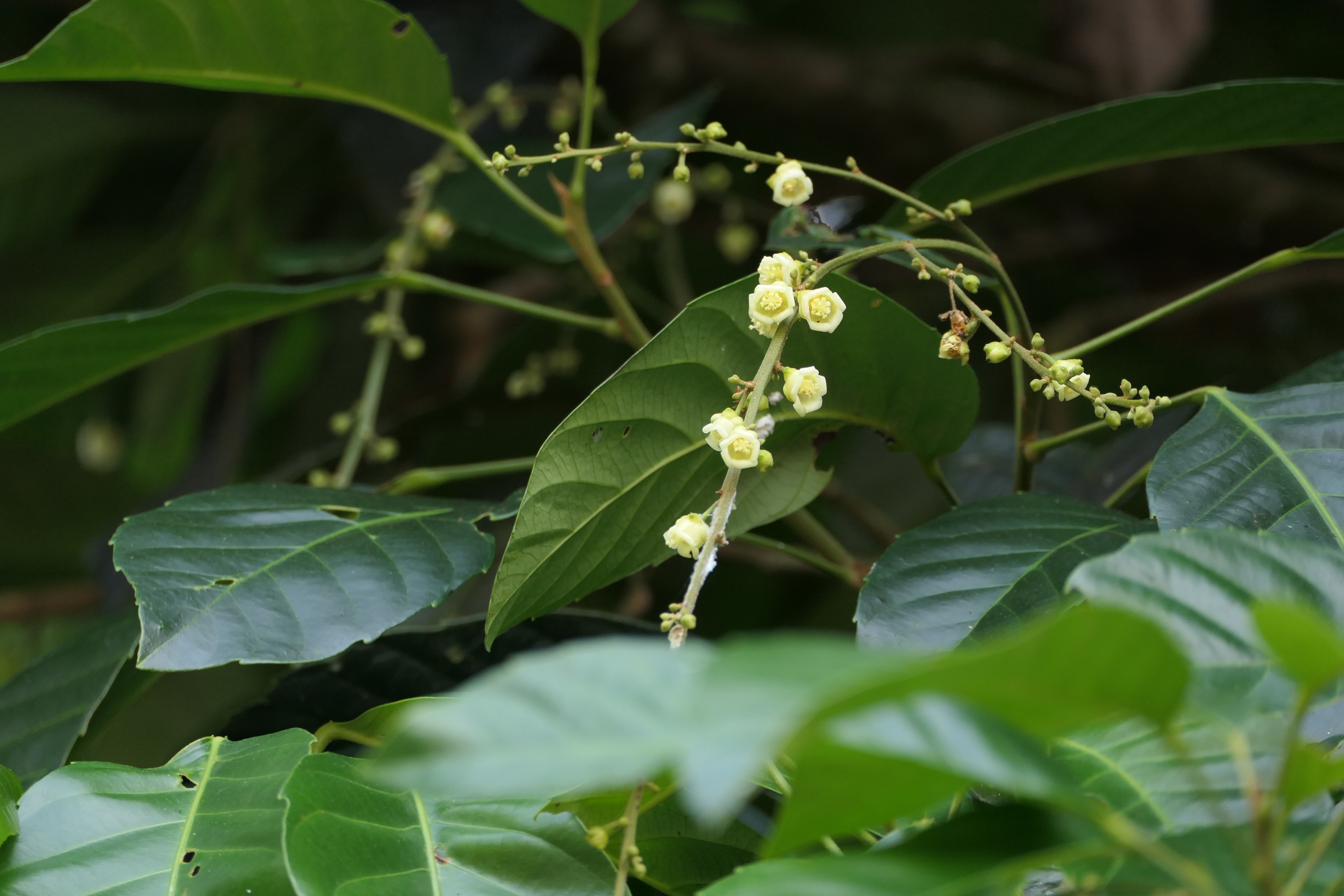
- Paracroton pendulus subsp. zeylanicus

Conservation status
- Least Concern (IUCN 3.1)

Scientific classification
- Kingdom: Plantae
- Clade: Tracheophytes
- Clade: Angiosperms
- Clade: Eudicots
- Clade: Rosids
- Order: Malpighiales
- Family: Euphorbiaceae
- Genus: Paracroton
- Species: P. pendulus

Binomial name
- Paracroton pendulus (Hassk.) Miq.

Subspecies
- Paracroton pendulus subsp. pendulus; Paracroton pendulus subsp. zeylanicus (Thwaites) N.P.Balakr. & Chakr.

Synonyms
- Blumeodendron muelleri Kurz; Croton pendulus Hassk.; Fahrenheitia collina Rchb. & Zoll. ex Müll.Arg.; Fahrenheitia pendula (Hassk.) Airy Shaw; Ostodes collina (Rchb. & Zoll. ex Müll.Arg.) Pax; Ostodes macrophylla (Müll.Arg.) Benth. & Hook.f.; Ostodes pendula (Hassk.) A.Meeuse; Ostodes serratocrenata Merr.; Paracroton pendulus subsp. pendulus; Trigonostemon macrophyllus (Müll.Arg.) Müll.Arg.; Tritaxis macrophylla Müll.Arg.

= Paracroton pendulus =

Species of flowering plant

Paracroton pendulus is a species of flowering plant in the family Euphorbiaceae. It is a tree native to the Western Ghats of southwestern India, Sri Lanka, southern Myanmar, Peninsular Thailand, Peninsular Malaysia and Singapore, Sumatra, Borneo, and the Philippines.

It is a canopy or subcanopy tree in tropical moist evergreen forests from 150 to 1800 meters elevation.

== Description ==
- Leaves - simple, alternate; lamina elliptic to oblanceolate; apex acuminate; margin serrate.
- Flowers - unisexual flowers are dioecious. inflorescence is panicled pendulous racemes.
- Fruits - globose brownish tomentose capsule.
- Uses - timber, medicine. red sap is known to have irritating ability.

== Subspecies ==
Two subspecies are accepted.

- Paracroton pendulus subsp. pendulus – southern Myanmar to the Philippines
- Paracroton pendulus subsp. zeylanicus (Thwaites) N.P.Balakr. & Chakr. (synonyms Desmostemon zeylanicus Thwaites, Fahrenheitia zeylanica (Thwaites) Airy Shaw, Ostodes zeylanica (Thwaites) Müll.Arg., and Trigonostemon zeylanicus (Thwaites) Müll.Arg.) – southwestern India and Sri Lanka
