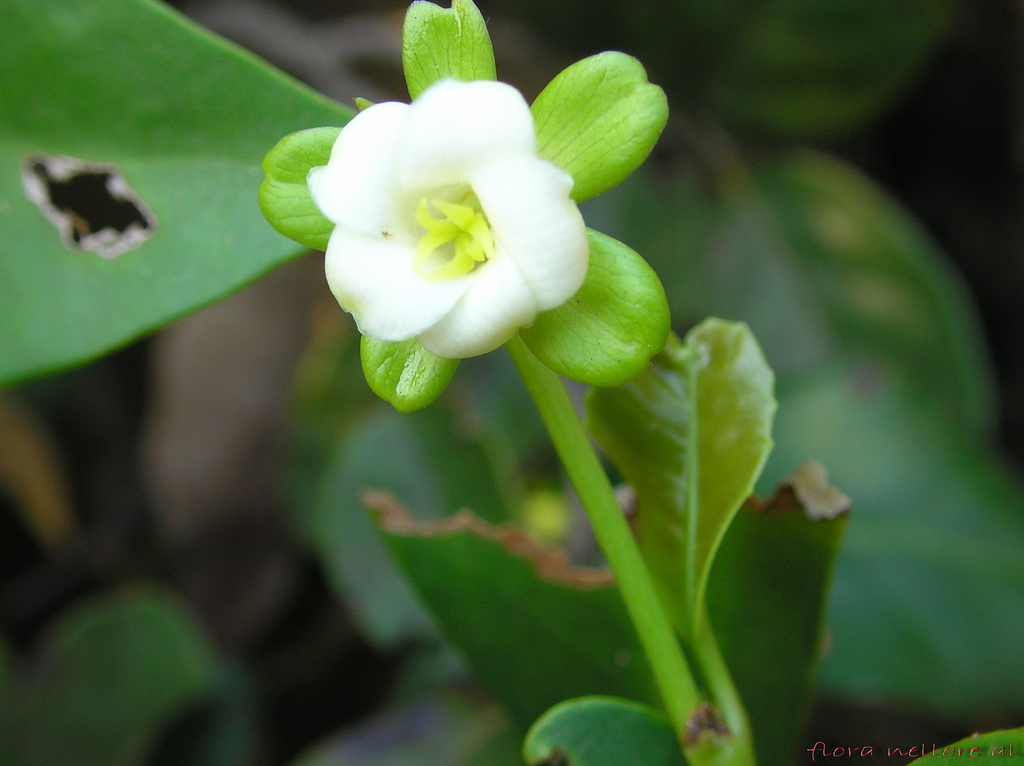
- Tritaxis glabella

Scientific classification
- Kingdom: Plantae
- Clade: Tracheophytes
- Clade: Angiosperms
- Clade: Eudicots
- Clade: Rosids
- Order: Malpighiales
- Family: Euphorbiaceae
- Subfamily: Crotonoideae
- Tribe: Codiaeae
- Genus: Tritaxis; Baillon

= Tritaxis (plant) =

Genus of flowering plants

Tritaxis is a genus of plants under the family Euphorbiaceae first described as a genus in 1858. It is native to Southeast Asia, including parts of India, Sri Lanka, China Hainan, else into Philippines New Guinea, and Northern Australia (Queensland). Until recently, many species were listed under the genus Dimorphocalyx, first described as a genus several years later in 1861.

Species

1. Tritaxis australiensis - Lesser Sunda Is, Papua New Guinea, Australia: (Queensland)
2. Tritaxis balakrishnanii - Andaman Islands
3. Tritaxis beddomei - India
4. Tritaxis cumingii - Philippines
5. Tritaxis denticulata - Philippines, Malaysia (Sarawak), Indonesia: (Borneo)
6. Tritaxis gaudichaudii - Vietnam
7. Tritaxis glabella - India, Sri Lanka
8. Tritaxis ixoroides - Philippines
9. Tritaxis kurnoolensis - India (Andhra Pradesh)
10. Tritaxis malayana - Thailand, Indonesia: (Borneo), Malaysia: (Sarawak), Philippines
11. Tritaxis meeboldii - Myanmar
12. Tritaxis moluccensis - Philippines
13. Tritaxis muricata - Thailand, Indonesia: (Borneo, Sumatra)
14. Tritaxis muricata - Malaysia: (Sarawak, Sabah), Philippines
15. Tritaxis pauciflora - Thailand, Malaysia: (Borneo, Sumatra)
16. Tritaxis poilanei - China (Hainan), Vietnam
17. Tritaxis trichocarpa - Malaysia: (Borneo)
