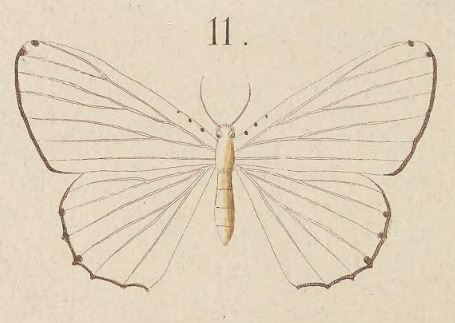

Scientific classification
- Kingdom: Animalia
- Phylum: Arthropoda
- Class: Insecta
- Order: Lepidoptera
- Family: Uraniidae
- Genus: Stesichora
- Species: S. puellaria

Binomial name
- Stesichora puellaria (Walker, 1866)

Synonyms
- Micronia puellaria Walker, 1866; Micronia titania Kirsch, 1877

= Stesichora puellaria =

Species of moth

Stesichora puellaria is a species of moth of subfamily Microniinae of family Uraniidae that is found in New Guinea. The species was first described by Francis Walker in 1866.
