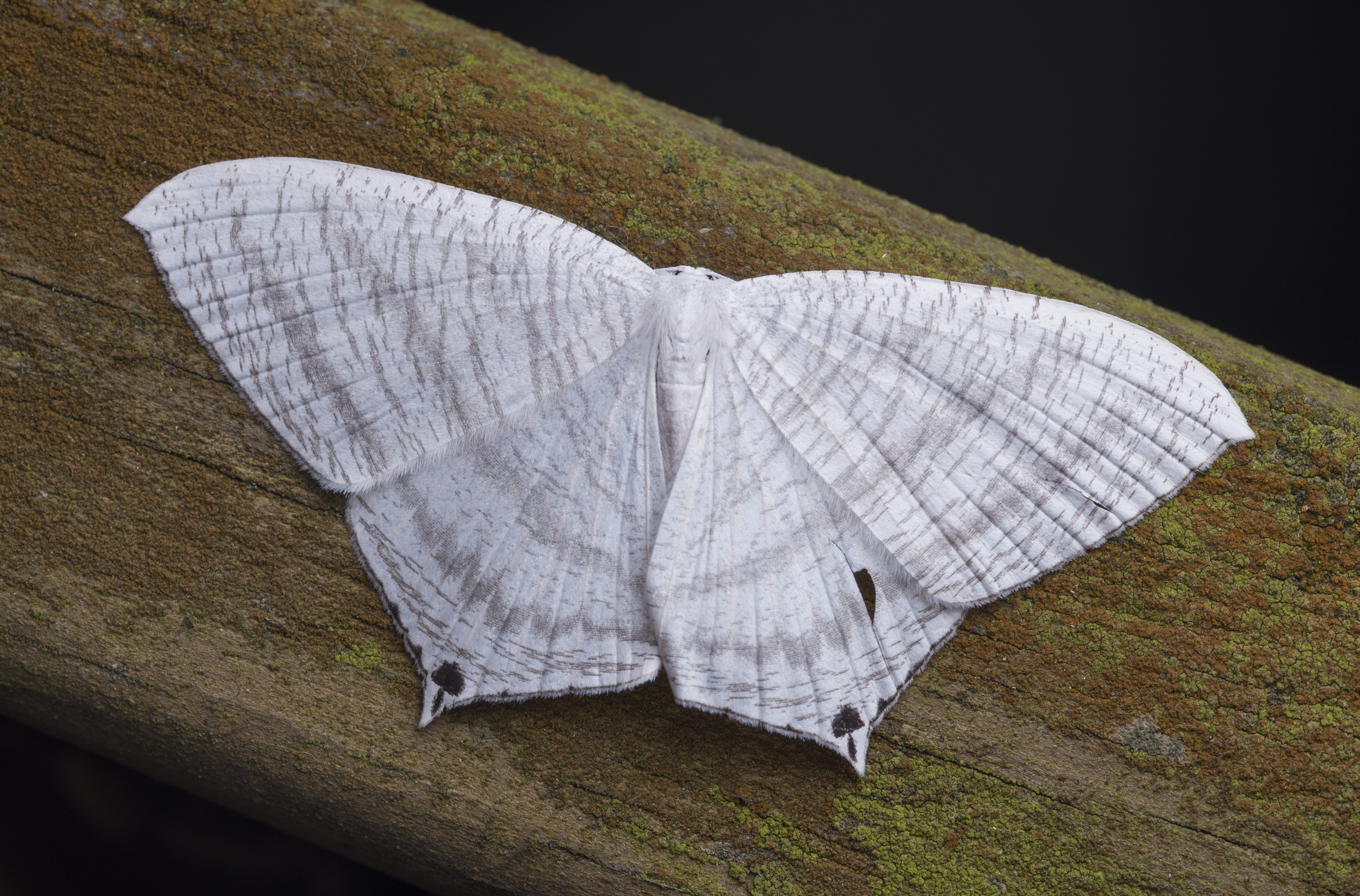
- Dorsal view
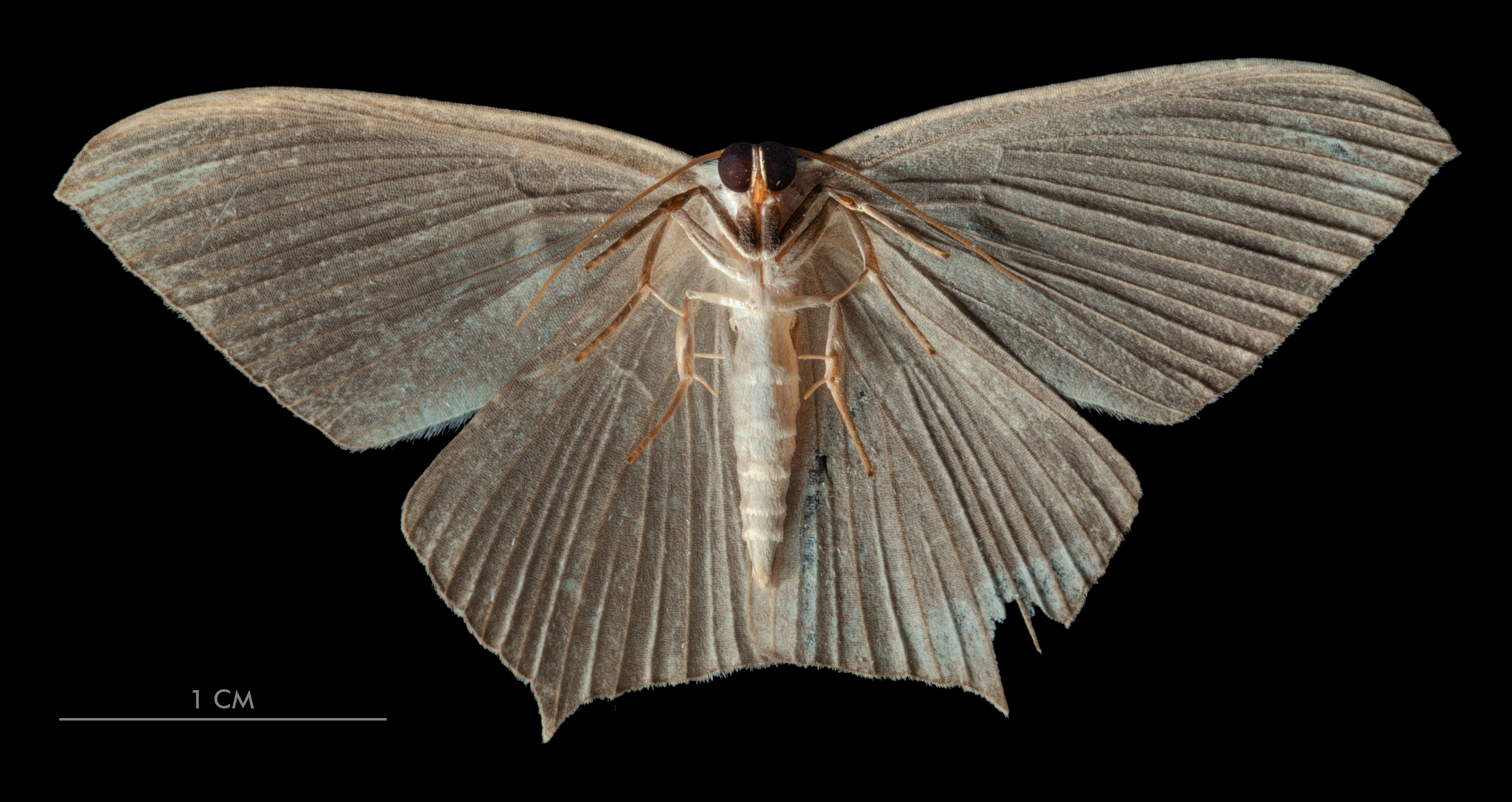
- Ventral view

Scientific classification
- Kingdom: Animalia
- Phylum: Arthropoda
- Clade: Pancrustacea
- Class: Insecta
- Order: Lepidoptera
- Family: Uraniidae
- Genus: Micronia
- Species: M. aculeata

Binomial name
- Micronia aculeata Guenée, 1857

Synonyms
- Swallowtail Moth: Micronia gannata Guenée, 1857; Micronia sondaicata Guenée, 1857

= Micronia aculeata =

Species of moth

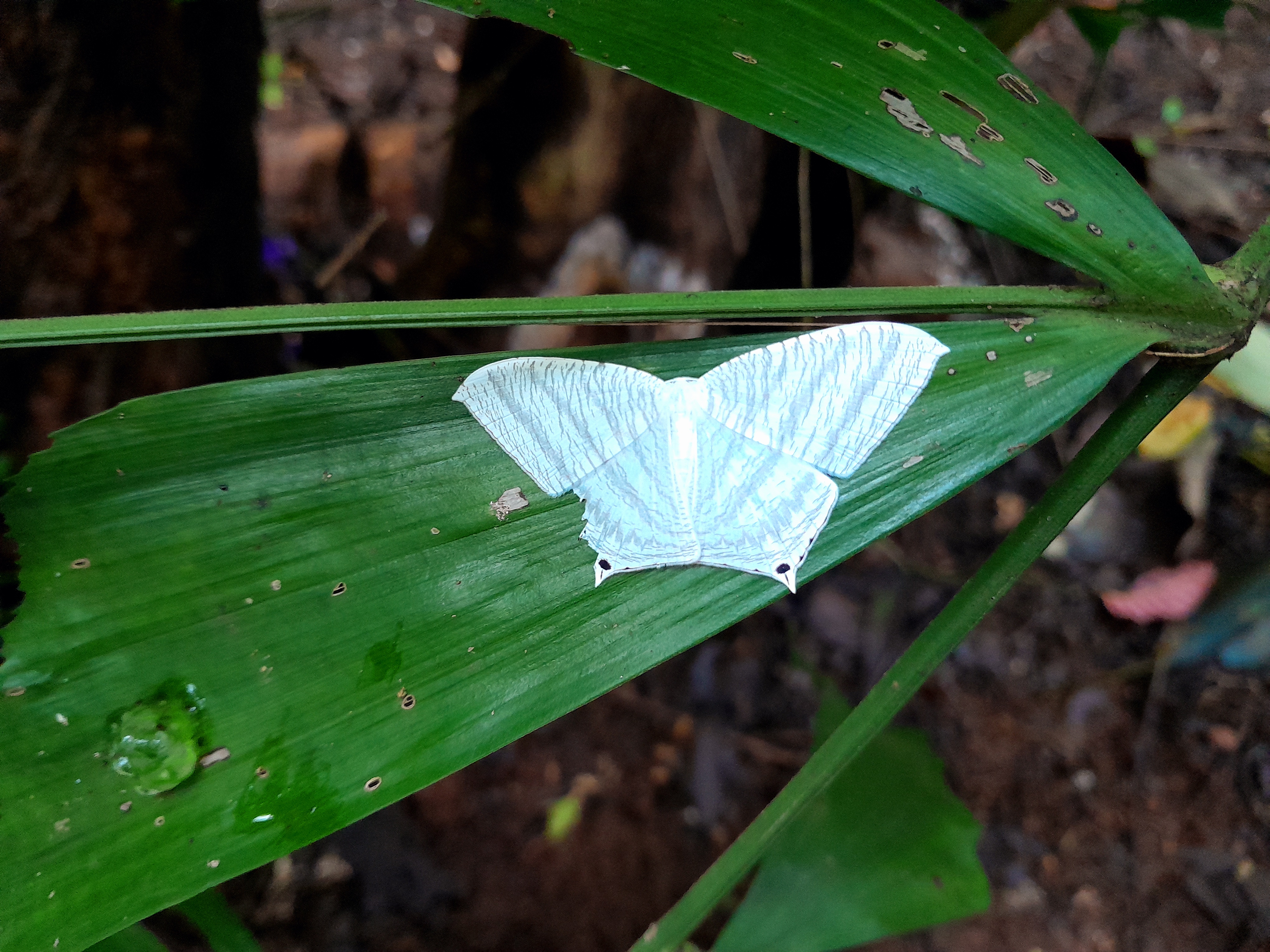
Sarovaram Bio Park, Calicut, Kerala, India

Micronia aculeata found in Udupi

Micronia aculeata also known as Grey Swallowtail Moth is a species of moth of subfamily Microniinae of family Uraniidae found in Myanmar, India and Sri Lanka towards Sulawesi. It was first described by Achille Guenée in 1857.

== Description ==
Its wingspan is 42–50 mm. Head, thorax, and abdomen white with a fuscous tinge. Wings white, closely striated with fuscous; somewhat ill-defined antemedial, medial, and postmedial fuscous oblique bands; a fine marginal line and black spot at base of tail of hindwing. Underside white or fuscous.

== Gallery ==
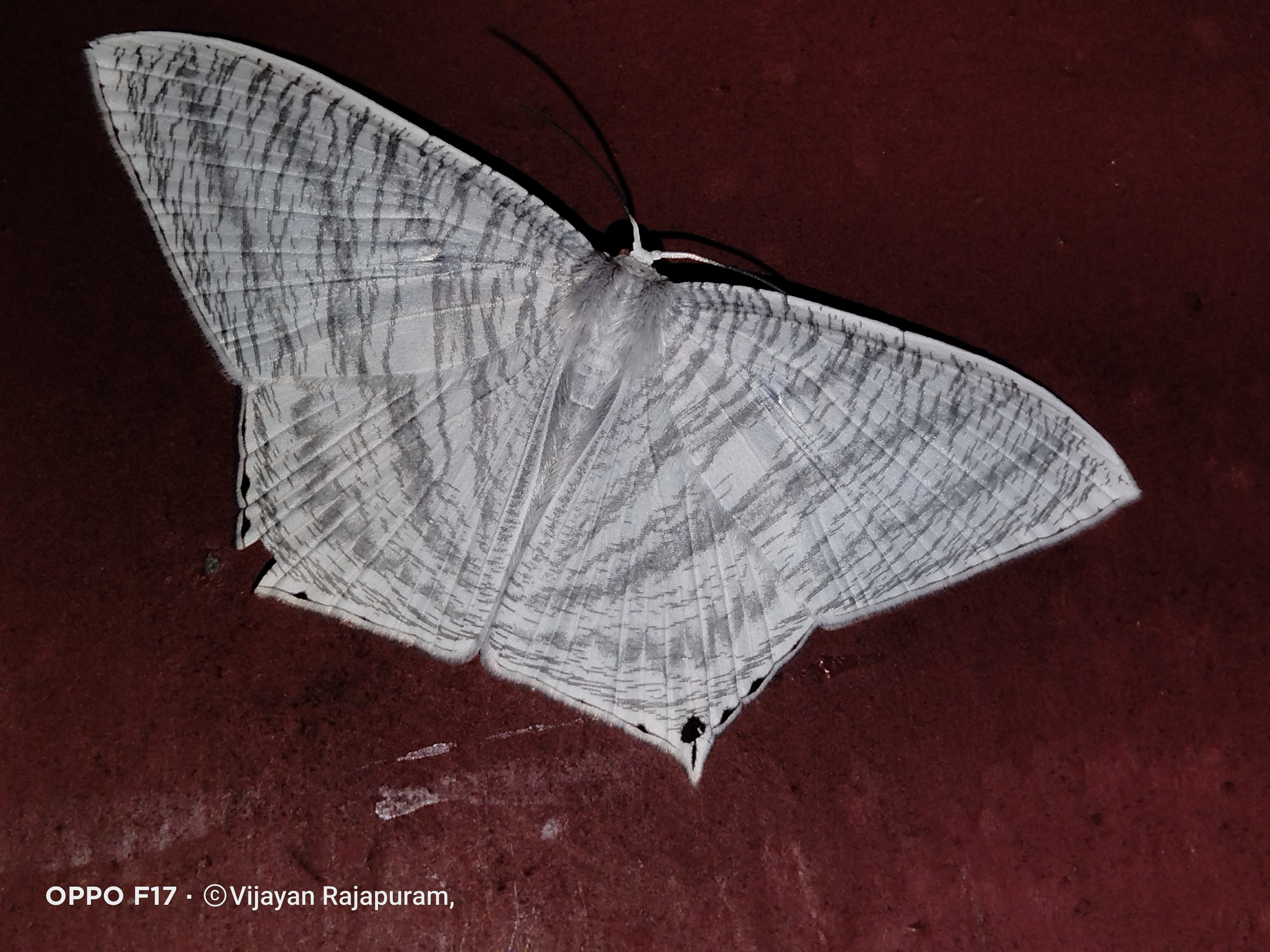
Madikai, Kerala, India

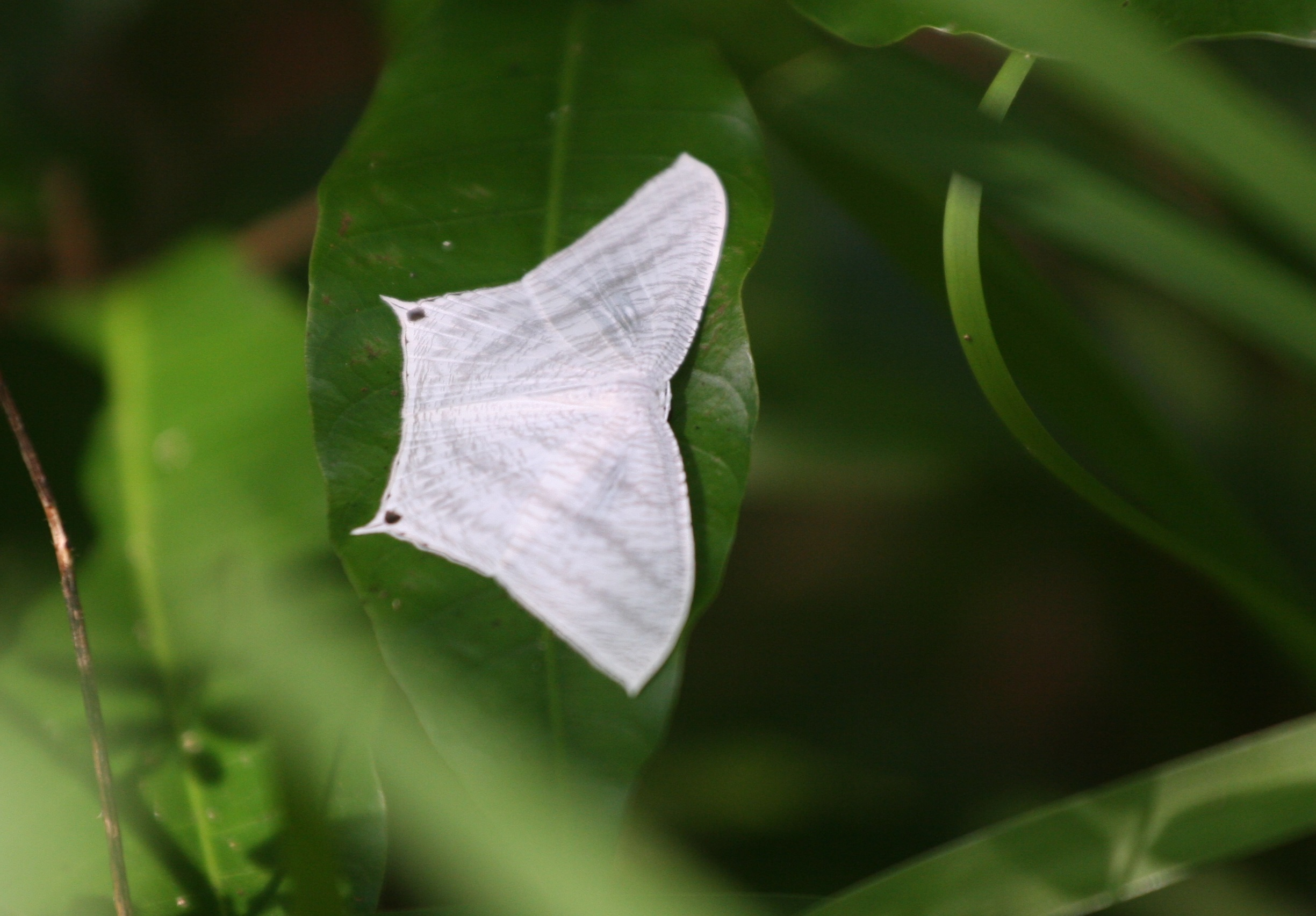
Kaludiya Pokuna Forest, Kandalama, Sri Lanka

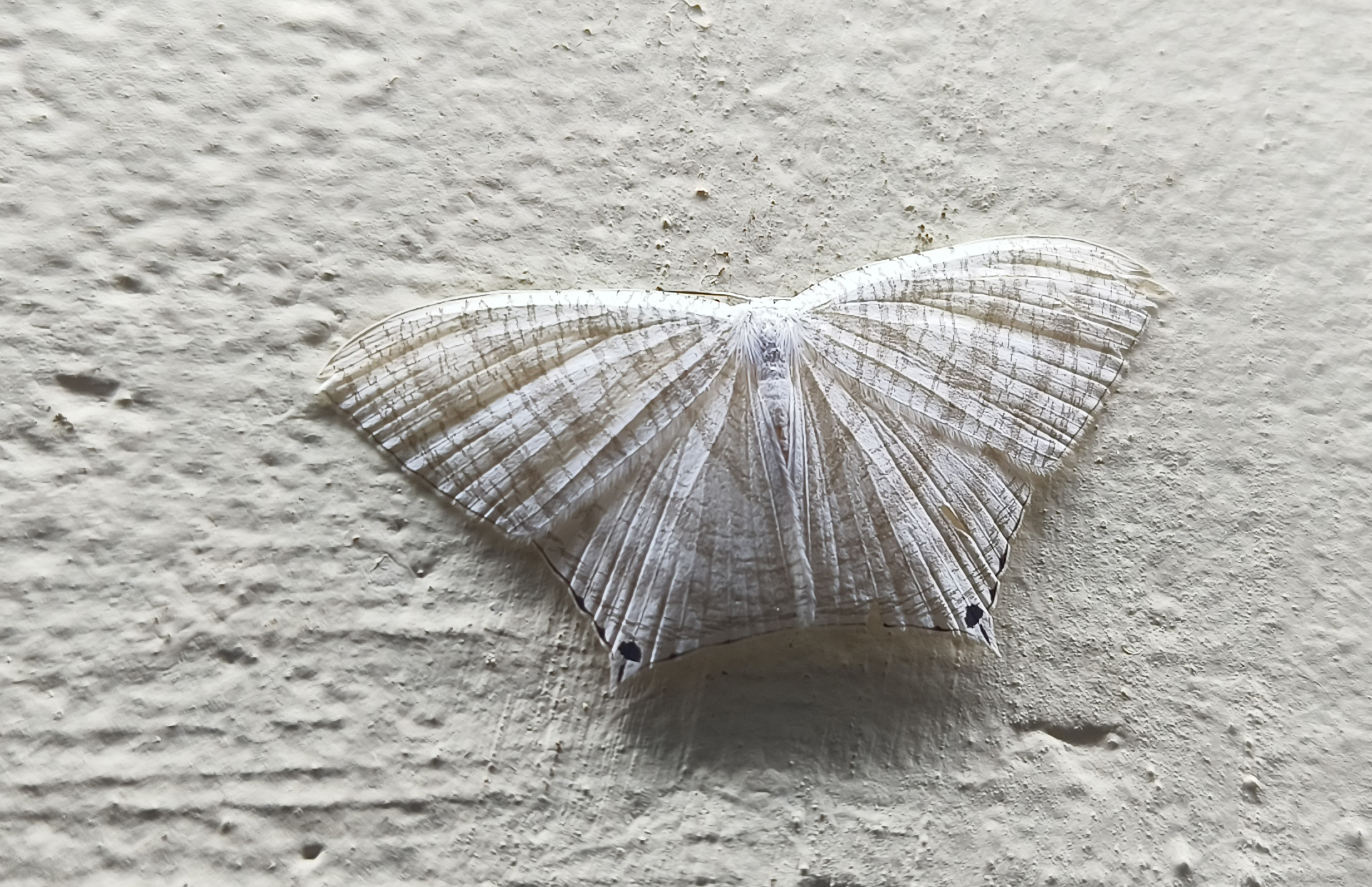
Attoor, Kanyakumari, India.
