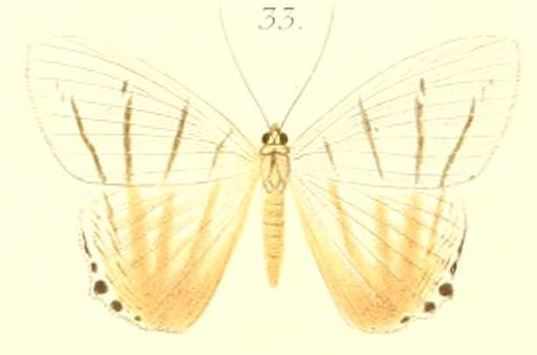

Scientific classification
- Domain: Eukaryota
- Kingdom: Animalia
- Phylum: Arthropoda
- Class: Insecta
- Order: Lepidoptera
- Family: Uraniidae
- Genus: Micronia
- Species: M. notabalis

Binomial name
- Micronia notabalis Pagenstecher, 1900

= Micronia notabalis =

Species of moth

Micronia notabilis is a species of moth of subfamily Microniinae of family Uraniidae that is found in Papua New Guinea. The species was first described by Arnold Pagenstecher in 1900.
