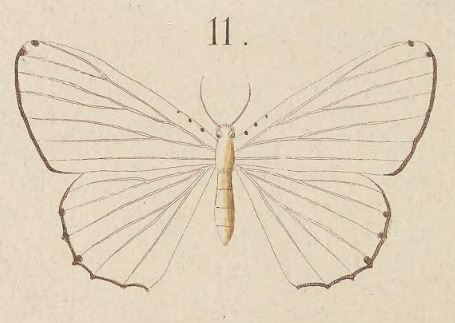
- Stesichora puellaria

Scientific classification
- Kingdom: Animalia
- Phylum: Arthropoda
- Class: Insecta
- Order: Lepidoptera
- Family: Uraniidae
- Subfamily: Microniinae
- Genus: Stesichora; Meyrick, 1886

= Stesichora =

Genus of moths

Stesichora is a genus of moths of subfamily Microniinae of family Uraniidae. The genus was erected by Edward Meyrick in 1886. The species of this genus are found in Indonesia (New Guinea), Papua New Guinea and Australia.

== Species ==
- Stesichora puellaria (Walker 1866) (New Guinea)
- Stesichora quadripunctata Warren 1896 (Australia)
