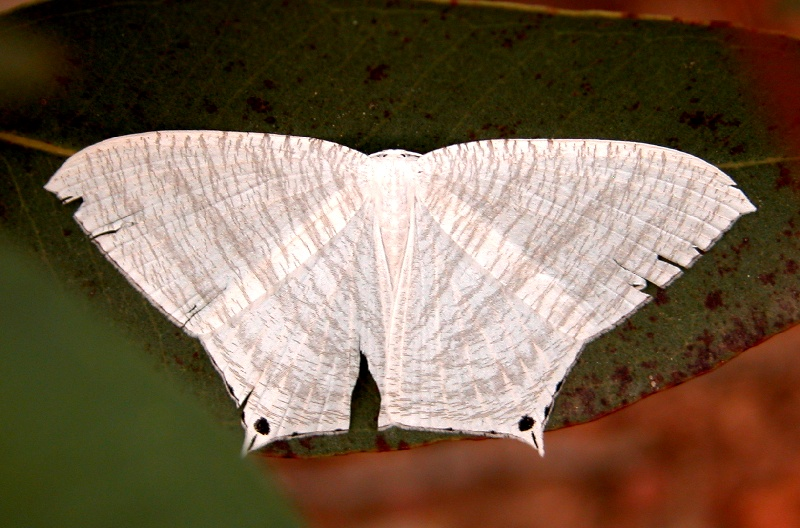
- Micronia aculeata

Scientific classification
- Kingdom: Animalia
- Phylum: Arthropoda
- Class: Insecta
- Order: Lepidoptera
- Family: Uraniidae
- Subfamily: Microniinae
- Genus: Micronia; Guenée, 1857

Synonyms
- Anteia Meyrick, 1866

= Micronia =

Genus of moths

Micronia is a genus of moths of subfamily Microniinae of family Uraniidae. The genus was erected by Achille Guenée in 1857. The species of this genus are found in India, Sri Lanka, Indonesia and Papua New Guinea.

== Description ==
Palpi porrect (extending forward), slender, and rather long. Antennae thickened and flattened. Hindleg of male with the femur very slender, the tibiae thickened, with one medial spur and a terminal pair; a tuft of short hair from the base on upperside. Forewing with the costa arched towards apex, which is acute; the outer margin straight; veins 2 and 3 on a short stalk; 6 and 7 from angle of cell; 8, 9 and 10 stalked. Hindwing with an angle at vein 4; veins 3 and 4 from cell.

== Species ==
- Micronia aculeata Guenée, 1857
- Micronia albidiorata Mabille, 1893
- Micronia dilatistriga Warren
- Micronia discata Warren
- Micronia falca Swinhoe
- Micronia fuscifimbria Warren
- Micronia interrupta Pagenstecher
- Micronia justaria Walker
- Micronia notabalis Pagenstecher, 1900
- Micronia obliterata Warren
- Micronia pluviosa Warren, 1897
- Micronia punctatissima Gaede, 1929
- Micronia semifasciata Mabille, 1879
- Micronia sinuosa Warren
- Micronia strigifera Warren
- Micronia thibetaria Poujade, 1895
- Micronia zebrata Warren
