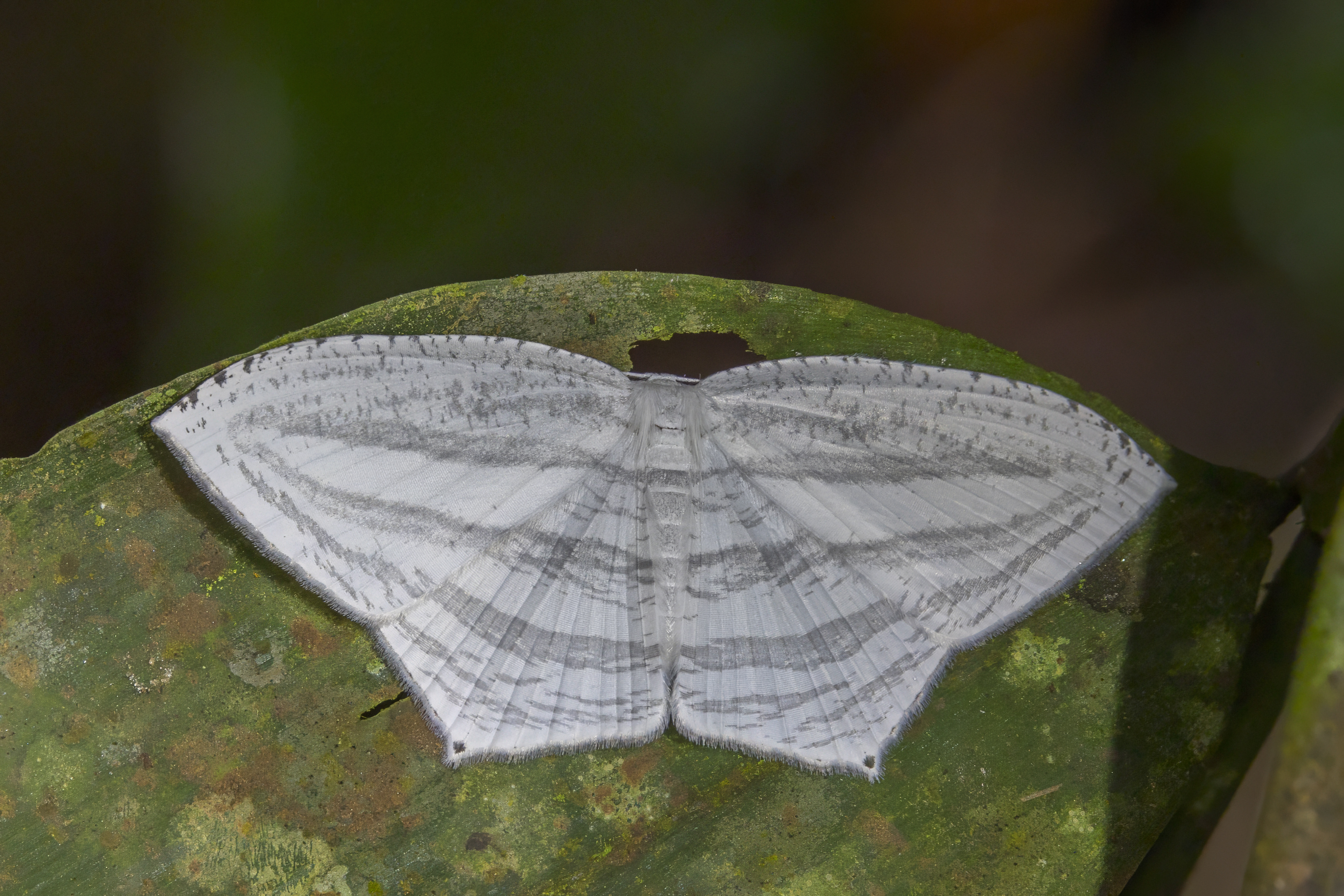
- A. costinigrata, Ghana

Scientific classification
- Domain: Eukaryota
- Kingdom: Animalia
- Phylum: Arthropoda
- Class: Insecta
- Order: Lepidoptera
- Family: Uraniidae
- Subfamily: Microniinae
- Genus: Acropteris; Geyer, 1832

Synonyms
- Acropterygia Herrich-Schäffer, 1856; Chlevasta Herrich-Schäffer, 1855

= Acropteris =

Genus of moths

Acropteris is a genus of moths of subfamily Microniinae of family Uraniidae. The genus was erected by Carl Geyer in 1832. The species of this genus are found in tropical Asia, Africa and Australia.

== Description ==
Palpi slender, upturned, and reaching vertex of head; antennae of male thickened and flattened. Fore wing with the costa arched, the apex acute, the outer margin straight; veins 3 and 4 from angle of cell in female; male with veins 2 and 3 stalked, 4 remote from 5, and the discocellulars distorted, 6 and 7 stalked; 8, 9, 10 stalked. Hind wing with the costa much lobed at base; veins 3 and 4 from angle of cell.

== Species ==
- Acropteris basiguttaria Walker
- Acropteris ciniferaria (Walker, 1866) - Eastern Asia
- Acropteris costinigrata Warren, 1897 - West Africa
- Acropteris grammearia Geyer, 1832 - East Asia
- Acropteris hypocrita Snellen, 1872 - DR Congo
- Acropteris illiturata Warren, 1897 - East Africa
- Acropteris inchoata (Walker, 1862)
- Acropteris insticta Warren, 1897 - Madagascar
- Acropteris iphiata (Guenée, 1857) - East Asia, Japan
- Acropteris leptaliata (Guenée, 1857) - Taiwan
- Acropteris mendax Snellen, 1872 - DR Congo
- Acropteris munda Warren
- Acropteris nanula Warren, 1898 - Australia
- Acropteris nigrisquama Warren, 1897 - Nigeria
- Acropteris parvidentata Warren
- Acropteris puellaria (Walker, 1866) - Timor
- Acropteris quadripunctata (Warren, 1896) - Australia
- Acropteris rectinervata Guenée - Malaya, Borneo
- Acropteris reticulata Warren, 1897
- Acropteris rhibetaria Poujade
- Acropteris sparsaria Walker - Taiwan
- Acropteris striataria (Clerck, 1764)
- Acropteris tenella Walker - India
- Acropteris teriadata (Guenée, 1857) - Australia
- Acropteris vacuata Warren, 1897 - Madagascar
