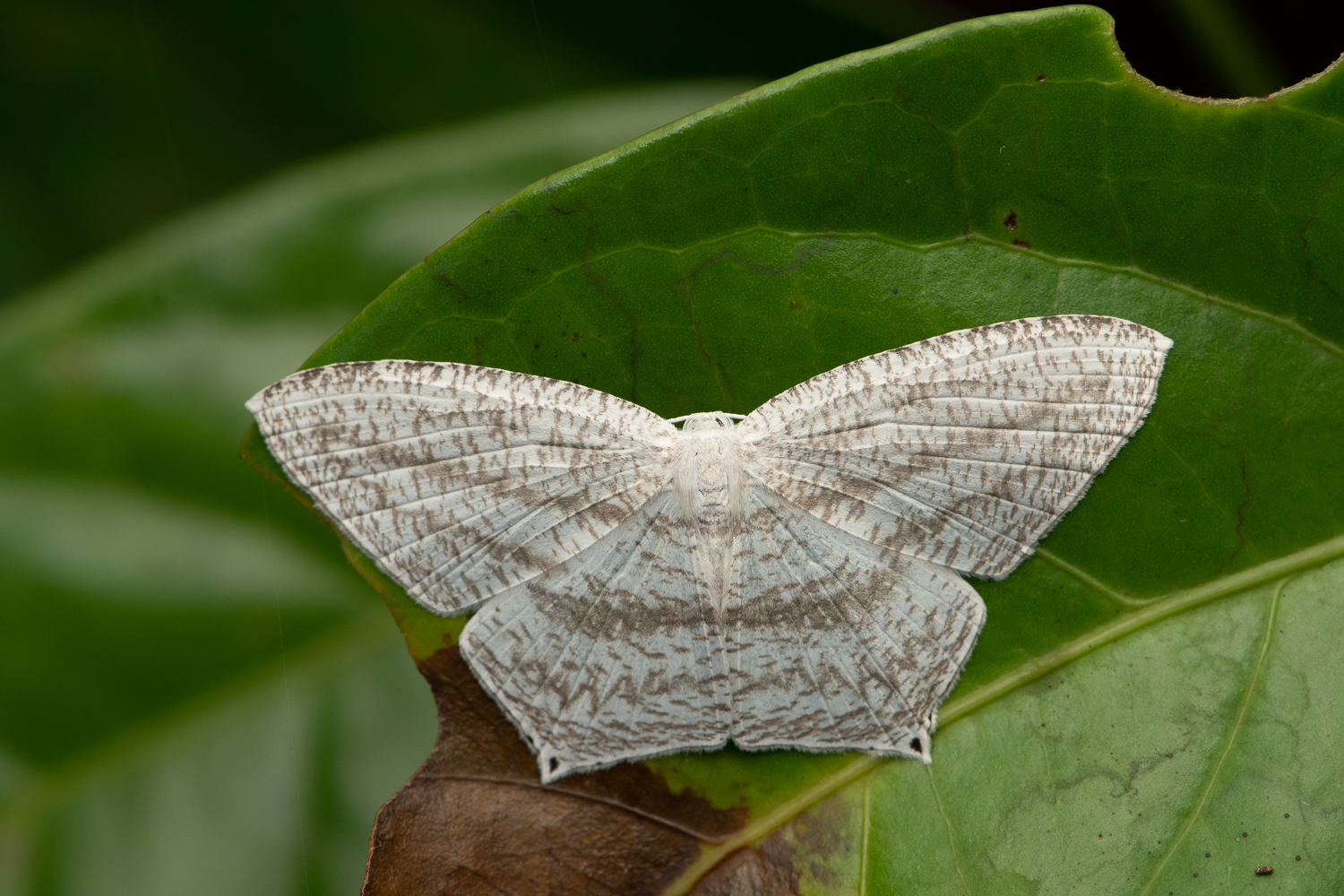
- Individual from Hebri, Karnataka, India

Scientific classification
- Kingdom: Animalia
- Phylum: Arthropoda
- Class: Insecta
- Order: Lepidoptera
- Family: Uraniidae
- Genus: Acropteris
- Species: A. ciniferaria

Binomial name
- Acropteris ciniferaria (Walker, 1866)

Synonyms
- Micronia ciniferaria Walker, 1866; Micronia obliquaria Moore, 1877

= Acropteris ciniferaria =

Species of moth

Acropteris ciniferaria is a moth of the family Uraniidae first described by Francis Walker in 1866. It is found in Oriental tropics of India, Sri Lanka, to Sulawesi and Lesser Sundas.

== Description ==
Its wings are typically white with a creamy tinge. Markings pale brown. Fasciae of forewing diffuse and obscure. Hingwing angle characterize by a black fleck and smaller flecks on either side. Caterpillar fusiform (spindle shaped), whereas head is round and narrow. Body translucent green with a dark dorsal line. Body skin polished and glossy in appearance with setae on tubercles. Pupa claviform and cremaster contain a pair of hooked shafts. Pupation occurs in a cocoon on the upper surface of leaf. The host plant is Stephanotis (syn. Dregea) species.
