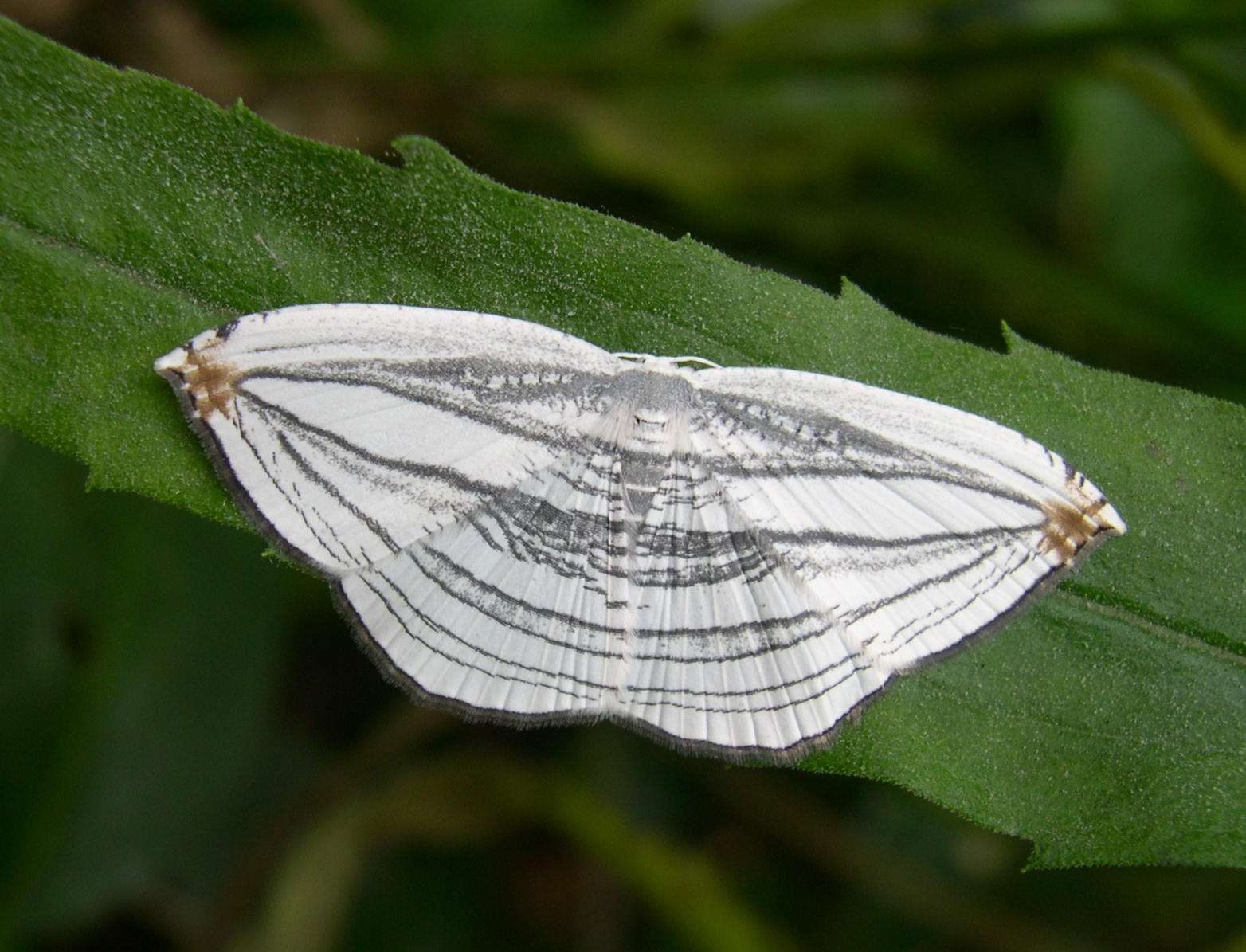

Scientific classification
- Kingdom: Animalia
- Phylum: Arthropoda
- Class: Insecta
- Order: Lepidoptera
- Family: Uraniidae
- Genus: Acropteris
- Species: A. iphiata

Binomial name
- Acropteris iphiata Guenée, 1857

= Acropteris iphiata =

Species of moth

Acropteris iphiata is a species of moth of the family Uraniidae first described by Achille Guenée in 1857. It is found in Japan, China and Korea.

The wingspan is 25–35 mm.

The larvae feed on Cynanchum, Metaplexis and Vincetoxicum (syn. Tylophora) species.
