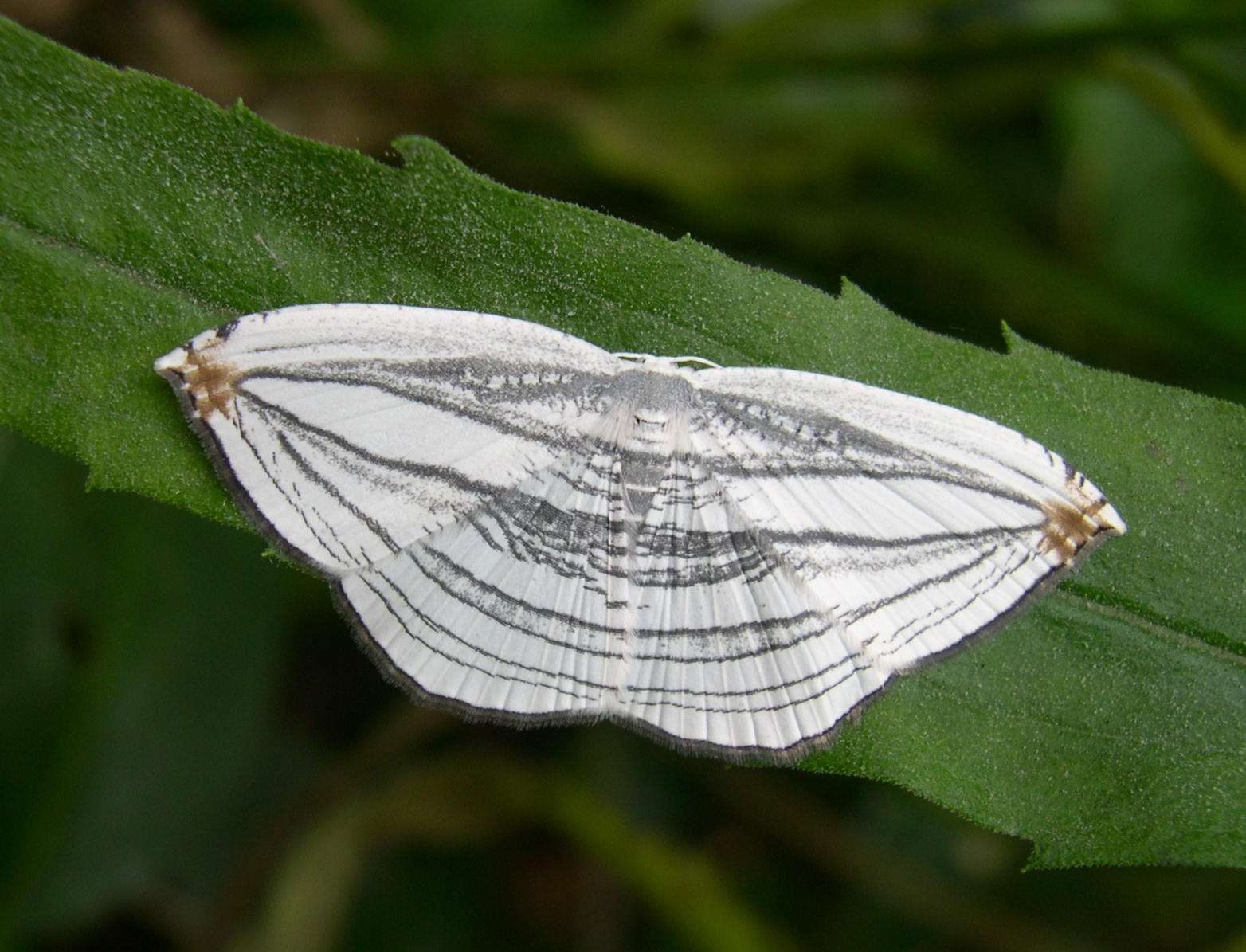
- Acropteris iphiata

Scientific classification
- Kingdom: Animalia
- Phylum: Arthropoda
- Clade: Pancrustacea
- Class: Insecta
- Order: Lepidoptera
- Family: Uraniidae
- Subfamily: Microniinae; Guenée, 1857

= Microniinae =

Subfamily of moths

Microniinae is a subfamily of the lepidopteran family Uraniidae.

== Genera ==
- Acropteris Geyer in Hübner, 1832
- Aploschema Warren, 1897
- Dissoprumna Warren, 1897
- Micronia Guenée, 1857
- Pseudomicronia Moore, [1887]
- Stesichora Meyrick, 1886
- Strophidia Hübner, [1823]
