= Breaker =

Breaker may refer to:

== Objects ==
- A breaking wave on water, or a "breaker", a shallow over which waves break
- Circuit breaker, an electrical overload switch
- Breaker (hydraulic), a percussion hammer attached to an excavator

== People ==
- Breaker Morant (1864–1902), Anglo-Australian folk hero, horseman, poet, soldier and convicted war criminal nicknamed "The Breaker"
- Daniel Breaker (born 1980), American actor and comedian
- Ronald Breaker, American biochemist and Yale professor
- Someone who performs B-boying, also known as breakdancing

== Places ==
- Breaker Mountain, Canada
- Mount Breaker, Graham Land, Antarctica
- Breaker Island, Palmer Archipelago, Antarctica
- Breaker Reef, Hong Kong, an uninhabited island

== Arts and entertainment ==
=== Music ===
- Breaker (Accept album), 1981
- Breaker (For Today album), 2010
- Breaker (Vary Lumar album), 2014
- The Breaker (album), by Little Big Town, 2017

=== Other ===
- The Breaker (film), a 1974 documentary about Breaker Morant
- The Breaker (manhwa), a Korean comic
- Breaker (Black), an outdoor sculpture
- Breaker (G.I. Joe), a fictional character
- The Breaker, a book by Minette Walters

== Other uses ==
- USS Breaker, several US Navy ships
- Ship breaker, a firm that engages in ship breaking, i.e. scrapping ships
- A brand of lager brewed in the UK by Coors
- Breaker fruit or breaker stage in the ripening of fruit

== See also ==
- Breaker! Breaker!, a 1977 action film starring Chuck Norris
- "Breaker-Breaker", a 1976 song by the American Southern rock band Outlaws
- Breakers (disambiguation)
- Breaking (disambiguation)
