= Breaking =

Breaking or breakin' may refer to:

== Arts ==
- Breaking character (or "corpsing"), to lose composure during comedic scenes
- Breakdancing (also breaking), an athletic style of street dance
- Breakin', a 1984 American breakdancing-themed musical film
- "Breakin'", a twelfth-season episode of the American animated television series SpongeBob SquarePants
- Breaking (film), a 2022 American thriller drama film
- Sequence breaking, performing actions or obtaining items in video games out of the intended linear order

=== Music ===
- "Breakin'" (song), a single from The Music's album, Welcome to the North
- "Breakin'... There's No Stopping Us", a song by American music duo Ollie & Jerry
- "Breakin'", the sixth song on The All-American Rejects' 2008 album When the World Comes Down
- Breaking (album), an album by American musician Brian Larsen
- "Breaking" (song), a song by American alternative rock band, Anberlin

== Damage ==
- Breaking (martial arts), technique that is used in competition, demonstration and testing
- Fracture, the separation of an object or material into two or more pieces under the action of stress
- Ship breaking, a type of ship disposal involving the breaking up of ships

== Other uses ==
- Break, a term with several meanings in cue sports
- Breaking, a step of horse training where the animal is ridden for the first time
- Breaking news, a current issue that warrants the interruption of a scheduled broadcast in order to report its details
- Breaking (trading cards), a term for opening trading card products
- Burglary (also breaking and entering), the act of entering an area without permission and with intent to commit a crime
- Vowel breaking, the sound change of a monophthong into a diphthong or triphthong

== See also ==
- Brake (disambiguation)
- Break (disambiguation)
- Break in (disambiguation)
- Breakdown (disambiguation)
- Breaker (disambiguation)
