= Winston Churchill High School (Maryland) =

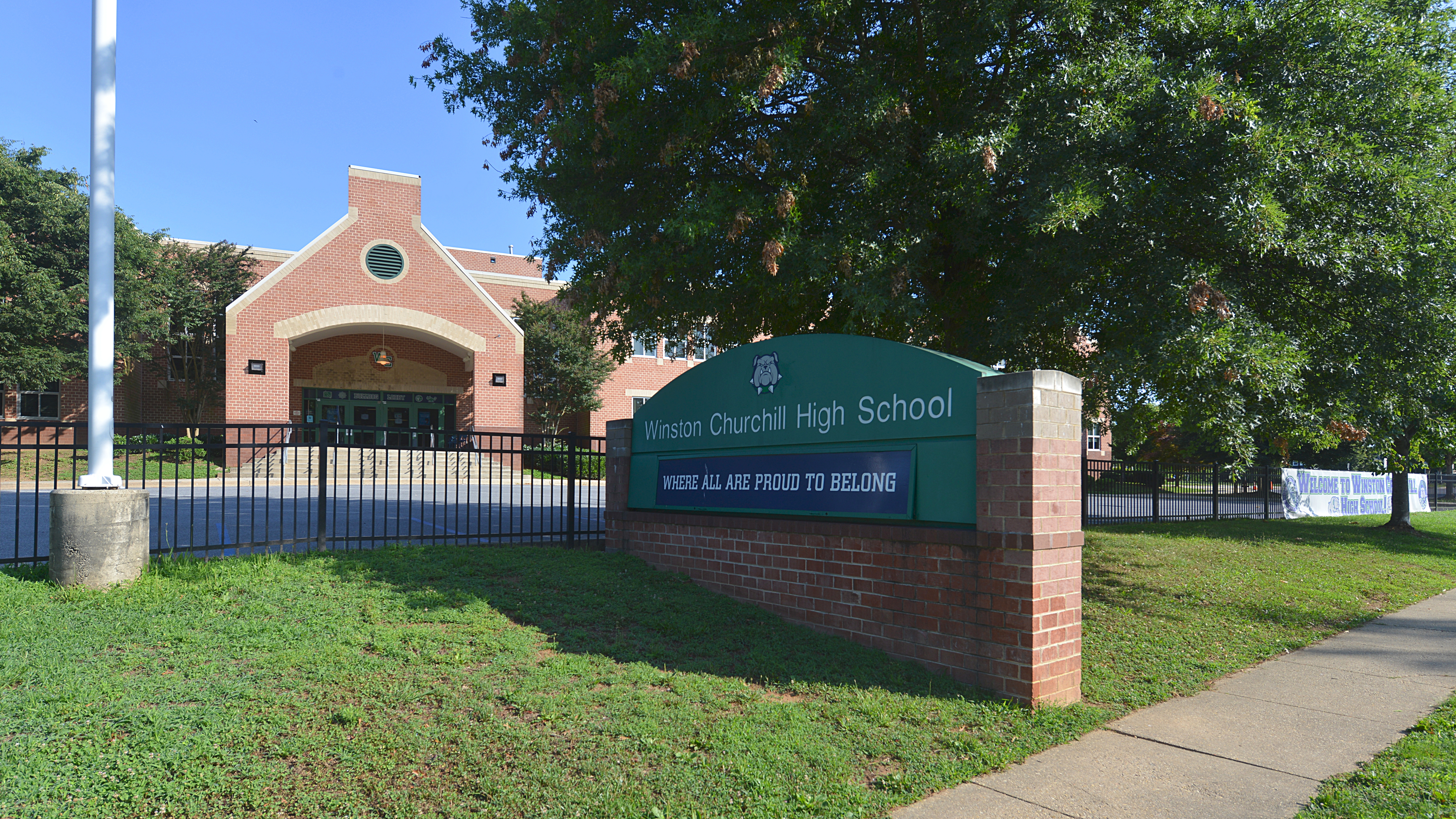

Location
- 11300 Gainsborough Road; Potomac, Maryland 20854; United States; 39°02′38″N 77°10′21″W

Information
- Former name: Potomac High School
- Type: Public high school
- Motto: School of Excellence; Where Excellence Soars; Where All Are Proud To Belong
- Established: 1964; 62 years ago
- School district: Montgomery County Public Schools
- NCES School ID: 240048000956
- Principal: John Taylor
- Teaching staff: 123.70 FTE (2023-24)
- Grades: 9–12
- Gender: Co-educational
- Enrollment: 2,203 (2023-24)
- Student to teacher ratio: 17.81 (2023-24)
- Campus type: Suburban
- Colors: Kelly green and royal blue
- Athletics conference: MPSSAA 4A
- Mascot: Bulldog
- Newspaper: The Churchill Observer
- Yearbook: Finest Hours
- Feeder schools: Herbert Hoover Middle School, Cabin John Middle School
- Website: www.montgomeryschoolsmd.org/schools/churchillhs/

Winston Churchill High School, often referred to as WCHS, Churchill High School, CHS or Churchill, is a public high school in Potomac, Maryland, United States, an unincorporated section of Montgomery County. It is the only public high school in Potomac.

The school is named after Winston Churchill, a British statesman and politician who was Prime Minister of the United Kingdom during World War II. Founded in 1964 as Potomac High School, the school's name was changed to "Winston Churchill High School" a year later.

Churchill belongs to the Montgomery County Public Schools system. Most of its students live in Potomac with a small portion in Bethesda.

== History ==
Winston Churchill High School was established in 1964 as Potomac High School. The school was renamed to honor Sir Winston Churchill the following year.

From 1999 to 2002, Churchill underwent renovations to modernize and revitalize the facilities. There was a formal rededication ceremony on April 21, 2002. Along with the opening of the new facility, the school's auditorium was renamed to the Dr. Gertrude G. Bish Auditorium, to honor the first principal of Churchill High School when it opened in 1964. She was the first woman high school principal in Montgomery County.

In January 2010, a criminal investigation exposed a grade-changing scandal at Churchill. 46 students' grades were modified after 8 students hacked the school's grade system. The incident was treated by the police as a criminal investigation.

In 2016, controversy spiked in Montgomery County around racial incidents at Churchill. In November, two students put a sign reading "whites only" on a bathroom door, later telling authorities that they found the sign and wanted to see people's reaction. A month later, a few students allegedly entered a meeting of the school's Republican club, called the members racist, and wrote "Black Lives Matter" on the classroom whiteboard. In response, a club member supposedly said "White Lives Matter" directed to the non-club members. A Montgomery County Republican leader was hurt by this and told school district leaders after being informed by a parent. Chair of the education committee of the Montgomery County Republican Central Committee, Richard Jurgena was worried for the state of the club and called for a "complete, rapid and nonpartisan" investigation.

In 2017, after a basketball game between Winston Churchill High School and Walter Johnson High School, Walter Johnson High School students defaced Winston Churchill High School property with vulgar graffiti. This caused $100,000 in damage.

On October 13, 2021, a female Churchill student was assaulted by a 17-year old student from Walt Whitman High School. This incident occurred at the Churchill bus loop in the morning where the assailant brandished a knife and attacked the victim. The assailant subsequently fled the scene only to be later identified and taken into custody. The victim sustained minor injuries and "enhanced monitoring" was supposedly implemented during future dismissals.

In May 2022, a student made threats of violence against the school on social media. These included mentions of bringing guns and explosives on school property and murder threats in retaliation for being mistreated at the school. The student was out of state at the time, however, and was prohibited from returning to Churchill for the remainder of the school year.

On February 13, 2023, Principal John Taylor sent out a message regarding a recent incident that occurred at the school. Racist graffiti in a boys bathroom at the school was noticed by a student and reported to school official, which prompted the removal of the graffiti and an investigation which has since gone unresolved.

== Areas Served ==
Churchill students come from two feeder middle schools and six elementary schools:

- Cabin John Middle School
  - Bells Mill Elementary School
  - Seven Locks Elementary School
- Herbert Hoover Middle School
  - Beverly Farms Elementary School
  - Potomac Elementary School
  - Wayside Elementary School
  - Cold Spring Elementary School

== School awards and academics ==
Churchill has been ranked in the top 100 high schools in the United States for years, climbing to 42 in 2007 and 75 in 2017. Churchill earned the 2007 Maryland Blue Ribbon Award and was selected by the U.S. Department of Education as a 2007 National No Child Left Behind Blue Ribbon School.

In 2012, Churchill was rated the best high school in Maryland and fifth among non-magnet schools nationally according to U.S. News & World Report. In 2016, the same report ranked Winston Churchill High School 94th in national ranking, 2nd in Maryland High Schools and 146th in STEM High Schools with 83.9 (out of 100) College Readiness Index. In 2017, Churchill was ranked the best high school in Maryland and 75th in the nation by U.S. News. As of 2024, Churchill has fallen to the 5th-ranked high school in Maryland and the 295th-ranked nationally, according to U.S News and World Report.

Currently Churchill is ranked number 402 in the US National Rankings and number 8 in the Maryland high school rankings according to U.S. News and World Report. Their current overall score is 97.75 out of 100. Throughout the 2020s, Churchill has consistently been one of the best academic public schools in the United States.

Churchill students average a score of 1299 on the SAT, with 640 on verbal and 659 on math.

== Departments and programs ==
Churchill has nine academic departments: Art, Computer Science, English, Foreign Language, Mathematics, Performing Arts, Physical Education, Science, and Social Studies.

=== Autism Program ===
The Autism Program provides a program for students with low-functioning autism. These students learn how to improve their skills at undertaking certain tasks and also learn speech.

=== Signature Program ===
The Signature Program allows students to follow one of several course paths to specialize in a particular career field. The program comprises three academies: the Academy of Math, Science, & Technology; the Academy of International Studies; and the Academy of Creative and Performing Arts.

=== Bridge Program ===
The Bridge Program provides a program for adolescents and young adults with learning/emotional disabilities. The program intends to foster academic skill development and alter behaviors that interfere with academic learning. It is supervised by an interdisciplinary team intended to meet the needs of socially vulnerable middle and high school students who may be challenged by problem-solving abstract thinking, organizing and planning, interpreting social cues, establishing relationships with peers, coping with anxiety, changes in routine, and transitioning.

=== Performing arts ===
Many theater productions are put on regularly, including a night of one act plays. The One Acts Festival is student-produced, directed, and funded by the drama club. Churchill also has a choir program. Showstoppers is a mixed-gender show choir group, while Jazz Ambassadors is a mixed-gender choir. Both groups regularly compete within Montgomery County, regionally, and nationally. Churchill also hosts an annual show choir competition.

Churchill's choral music groups are Voice of a Generation (VOAG), Jazz Ambassadors, and Showstoppers.

Voice of a Generation is a non-audition group for students who like to sing and learn about the study of music. Students learn to sight-read, read music, and improve their performance skills.

Jazz Ambassadors is a coed ensemble selected through auditions, focusing on developing vocal technique. Most songs are challenging jazz music, but this is often stretched to arrangements of different kinds of music like pop or classical.

Showstoppers is an honors show choir group of students selected through auditions who previously held choir positions at Churchill. This group features musically challenging music. Most music is popular, but any musical style, including sacred and secular works, is rehearsed and performed.

In 2007, Churchill's fall production of Singin' in the Rain was nominated for six Cappies High School Theater Awards, winning Best Orchestra (for the third consecutive year), Best Cameo Actor, and Best Cameo Actress. Only one other school received more awards.

In 2009, Churchill's fall production of Rent: School Edition was nominated for four Cappies High School Theater Awards: Best Male Vocalist, Best Female Vocalist, Best Orchestra, and Best Song. Churchill won awards for Best Female Vocalist as well as Best Orchestra.

Many students form bands, typically of a rock variety, and the school occasionally facilitates this by sponsoring a battle of the bands or band performance. The school has sponsored day-long concerts on school grounds; the Merritthon, a fundraising event for Leukemia research, occurred annually from 2002 to 2004.

In 2009, the instrumental music program won four awards at the Windy City Classic, including Best Symphonic Band, Best Orchestra, Best Classical Soloist, and Best Overall Program. The jazz band received second place in that category. All three groups received a gold rating.

=== Publications ===
Churchill produces three publications, all of which have won awards: its newspaper, The Churchill Observer; its yearbook, Finest Hours; and its literary magazine, Erehwon.

== Athletics ==
=== Legacy Cup ===
Winston Churchill High School Athletics compete with local high schools Walter Johnson High School, Walt Whitman High School, Thomas S. Wootton High School, and Bethesda-Chevy Chase High School in an annual athletics tournament for the Legacy Cup which started in the 2024-25 School year where the school with the most varsity sports wins would claim the cup for the following year. Winston Churchill High School won the first Legacy Cup.

Legacy Cup Victories: 2024-25, 2025-26

Football has a similar trophy called the Congressional Cup with the same schools but for whichever team won the series between the five schools during the regular varsity football season.

Winston Churchill High School offers the following sports:

=== Fall ===
- Cheerleading
- Cross-country
- Field hockey
- Football
- Golf
- Poms
- Boys' soccer
- Girls' soccer
- Girls' tennis
- Girls' volleyball
- Girl's Flag Football
- Pickleball (MCPS Corollary)

=== Winter ===
- Boys' basketball
- Girls' basketball
- Cheerleading
- Ice hockey (Capitals Cup Youth League)
- Poms
- Indoor track
- Swimming and diving
- Wrestling
- Bocce (MCPS Corollary)

=== Spring ===
- Baseball
- Softball
- Coed softball (MCPS Corollary)
- Boys' lacrosse
- Girls' lacrosse
- Boys' tennis
- Girls' tennis
- Track and field
- Boys' volleyball (MCPS)
- Coed volleyball

Winston Churchill High School has the most MPSSAA state championships in Montgomery County with 48 MPSSAA state championships (not including the 8 Ice Hockey state championships as it isn't an official MPSSAA sport), they have the most golf state championships in MPSSAA and the most 4A State championships in MPSSAA.

=== State championships ===
Team State championships
Season	Sport	Number of championships	Year
Fall	Cross country, boys'	4	1968, 1975, 1977, 1978
Fall	Cross country, girls'	2	1979, 1991
Fall	Football	2	1976, 1977
Fall	Field hockey	2	1978, 1983
Fall	Golf	17 (Most in state)	1976, 1987, 1988, 1995, 1998, 2002, 2003, 2004, 2005, 2006, 2008, 2010, 2014, 2015, 2019, 2024, 2025
Fall	Soccer, boys'	7	1980, 1985, 1992, 1993, 1994, 1999, 2002, 2009
Winter	Basketball, girls'	2	2002, 2003
Winter	Basketball, boys'	1	1978
Winter	Ice hockey	8	2006, 2011, 2013, 2015, 2016, 2017, 2018, 2019, 2020, 2022
Winter	Indoor track, boys'	2	1976, 2011
Winter	Swimming and diving, girls'	3	2009, 2012, 2015, 2025
Winter	Swimming and diving, boys'	2	2018, 2019, 2022, 2024
Spring	Baseball	1	1979
Spring	Outdoor track, boys'	1	1976
Spring	Lacrosse, boys'	1	2022
Spring	Tennis, boys'	1	2026
Spring	Tennis, girls'	1	2026
Total		56	

== Notable alumni ==
- Jody A. Breckenridge née Hinchion, Vice Admiral of the US Coast Guard, Commander of the Pacific Area
- Susan C. Lee (class of 1972), state senator, Maryland General Assembly
- Samuel L. Stanley (class of 1972), President, Michigan State University
- John F. Mulholland Jr. (class of 1973), U.S. Army officer
- Elisa New (class of 1976), professor of English at Harvard University
- Brian Holloway (class of 1977), professional football player, All-Pro, Stanford graduate, NFL first-round draft pick
- Jeffrey Allan Kemp (class of 1977), NFL player, quarterback for Los Angeles Rams, Seattle Seahawks, San Francisco 49ers; son of Jack Kemp
- Michael Hardt (class of 1978), philosopher, author
- Cheryl Kagan (class of 1979), state senator, Maryland General Assembly
- Kenny Kramm (class of 1979), entrepreneur, inventor of FLAVORx
- Darren Star (class of 1979), television creator and producer (Beverly Hills, 90210, Melrose Place, Sex and the City, Younger)
- Marti Leimbach (class of 1981), novelist
- Paul Palmer (class of 1983), former NFL player, first-round draft pick and College Football Hall of Famer, and came second in Heisman voting, consensus All-America, and led nation in rushing all in 1986
- Travis Curtis (class of 1983?), former NFL safety
- Lori Alan Denniberg (class of 1984), actress and voice actor best known as Pearl in SpongeBob SquarePants and Diane Simmons in Family Guy
- Deborah Copaken (class of 1984), writer and photojournalist (Shutterbabe)
- Bruce Murray (class of 1984), international soccer player; two-time All-American at Clemson; selected to College Team of the Century; member of 1988 Summer Olympics and 1990 FIFA World Cup soccer teams; National Soccer Hall of Fame
- Jonathan Holloway (class of 1985), professor and dean at Yale University, president of Rutgers University
- Jennie Koch Easterly (class of 1986), U.S. Army officer, federal government official
- Mike Sacks (class of 1986), magazine editor, humor writer
- Julie Kent (class of 1987), American Ballet Theatre, principal dancer for 22 years
- Mike Barrowman (class of 1987), swimmer, 1992 Olympic gold medalist, 200-meter breaststroke
- Rochelle Walensky (class of 1987), director of the Centers for Disease Control and Prevention
- Joe Jacobi (class of 1987), American Olympic canoeist, won gold in a C2 even in Barcelona
- Jimmy Kemp (class of 1989), CFL football player, president of the Jack Kemp Foundation
- Jordan Ellenberg (class of 1989), mathematician and author, How Not to Be Wrong
- Tim Sweeney (class of 1989), founder of Epic Games; most known for creating Fortnite
- Rachel Nichols (class of 1991), ESPN reporter
- Jeff Halpern (class of 1994) (did not graduate), NHL player, first from Southeast U.S.
- Robyn Cohen (class of 1994), actress
- Dhani Jones (class of 1996), NFL player, TV personality, The Travel Channel and CNBC
- Bryan Cogman (class of 1997) (did not graduate), Emmy Award-winning writer, Game of Thrones
- Ben Feldman (class of 1998), actor, Drop Dead Diva, Mad Men, Superstore
- Gibran Hamdan (class of 1998) (did not graduate), NFL player, backup quarterback for Washington Redskins
- Kelen Coleman (class of 2002), actress, The Office, The Mindy Project, The Newsroom, The McCarthys
- Jerome Dyson (class of 2005) (did not graduate), professional basketball player
- Kamie Crawford (class of 2010), Miss Teen USA 2010
- Shinsaku Uesugi (class of 2010), chess player (Chess Olympiad)
- Joshua Coyne (class of 2011), composer and musician
- Taylor Momsen (class of 2011) (did not graduate), actor (How the Grinch Stole Christmas!, Spy Kids, Gossip Girl); musician (The Pretty Reckless)
- Eric Brodkowitz (class of 2014), Israeli-American baseball pitcher for the Israel national baseball team
- Noah Bratschi (class of 2018), professional speed climber, American record holder, Bronze medalist World Championships, World Cup silver medalist, 9x US World Team
- Chris Hacopian (class of 2023), MLB player for the Washington Nationals
