= Brian Larsen =

American musician and business executive

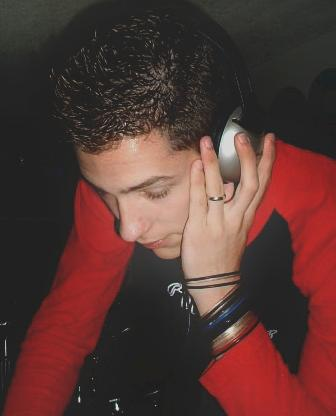
- On stage in Baltimore, May 2006
- Born: Brian Charles Larsen; April 9, 1986 (age 40); Laurel, Maryland, U.S.
- Education: University of Maryland (BS); University of Virginia (MBA)
- Occupations: Musician; Producer; Entrepreneur; Business Executive
- Title: Co-Founder, President & CEO of RestoraPet

Brian Larsen (born April 9, 1986, in Laurel, Maryland) is a multi-instrumentalist, singer, record producer, entrepreneur and business executive. Larsen has released ten albums, eight under the name "Twilight's Moon" and two under his own name, 2009's Breaking and 2012's Building. In late 2012, it was announced that Larsen's eleventh album would be titled Being and is to be released in 2021. Larsen is also the co-founder, President, and CEO of the company RestoraPet.

== Early life ==
Born in Laurel, Maryland, a small suburb of Washington, D.C., Larsen was the fourth and youngest son in his family. Larsen's first forays into songwriting took place while he was still in elementary school. Inspired by his older uncle, Bryon Moore, who achieved success in music through his popular South Carolina band Uncle Mingo.

== Career ==
=== Twilight's Moon ===
In 1996, Larsen officially formed Twilight's Moon with schoolmates Trevor Hunter, Alex Masonis, and Andrew Jones, though Masonis and Jones left the band less than a year later over creative control disputes. Hunter and Larsen continued recording, with Hunter assuming Jones' role as drummer and Larsen assuming Masonis' role as keyboardist. Hunter vacated his role as performer, agreeing instead to concentrate on acting as Larsen's manager, and in response, Larsen agreed to assume all musical roles within the band.

The album, Pi, was released in September 1998 and sold several hundred copies. Larsen immediately began recording The Classics, a disc composed solely of original and interpreted classical songs. The album was released in February 1999 to positive reviews but poor sales. The next year, Larsen began writing and recording demos for what would eventually become The Slope, his first internationally distributed album. The album was released on August 3, 2000, to mixed reviews, but became a modest hit thanks to the instrumental track "Zoo II".

Larsen returned to the studio to record a follow-up album with the specific intention of recording tracks that were more radio-friendly. The resulting album, ClockWork, was released on January 23, 2001, and featured a guest performance from Larsen's uncle, Bryon Moore. Overall, the album received a positive commercial and critical response. Inspired by this success, Larsen performed live in support of the album but quickly returned to the studio to record a follow-up album using digital recording equipment. That album, Emergency Exit, was received even more enthusiastically by critics and fans alike, being called "the beginning of Larsen hitting his musical stride" and "the best Twilight's Moon album to [that] point" by noted critic Steven Thomas Erlewine.

After the release of Emergency Exit, Larsen took an extensive vacation from the music industry while attending high school. He released Close to Me, a five-track EP, on his 16th birthday, but stated on his website that he intended to begin work on an album of trance music. That album, Electric, took nearly two years to complete, but was met with great commercial success upon its release in 2003, supported by the album's self-titled single as well as the track "Casino", both of which received rotation in American and Asian dance clubs.

Demand for a new album led to Larsen recording his first original tracks of rock music in two years. Broken Windows, a mixture of original tracks and cover songs, was released on December 23, 2003, to mixed reviews. Some critics criticized Larsen for his use of cover tracks on the album. B-sides from the Broken Windows sessions were collected and released as Mind Candy in early 2004. Similar to the quick follow-up of Emergency Exit to ClockWork (spaced ten months apart), Larsen indicated that his desire was to release a follow-up album to Broken Windows, tentatively titled The Last of the Romantics, sometime in late 2004. Writer's block and Larsen's involvement in other projects stalled the album, however, and its release date was pushed back several times. In June 2005, the album was listed on Amazon.com as being available for pre-order, selling enough copies to enter Amazon.com's best-sellers list before the release date was changed once more. Several singles have been officially released from the album, however, including "In the Fall", "In the Summer", "Goodnight", "I Tried", and "In the Meantime", all of which have received significant downloads on Larsen's official website and MySpace. A six-song EP, In the Meantime, was released in August 2007.

== Solo artist ==
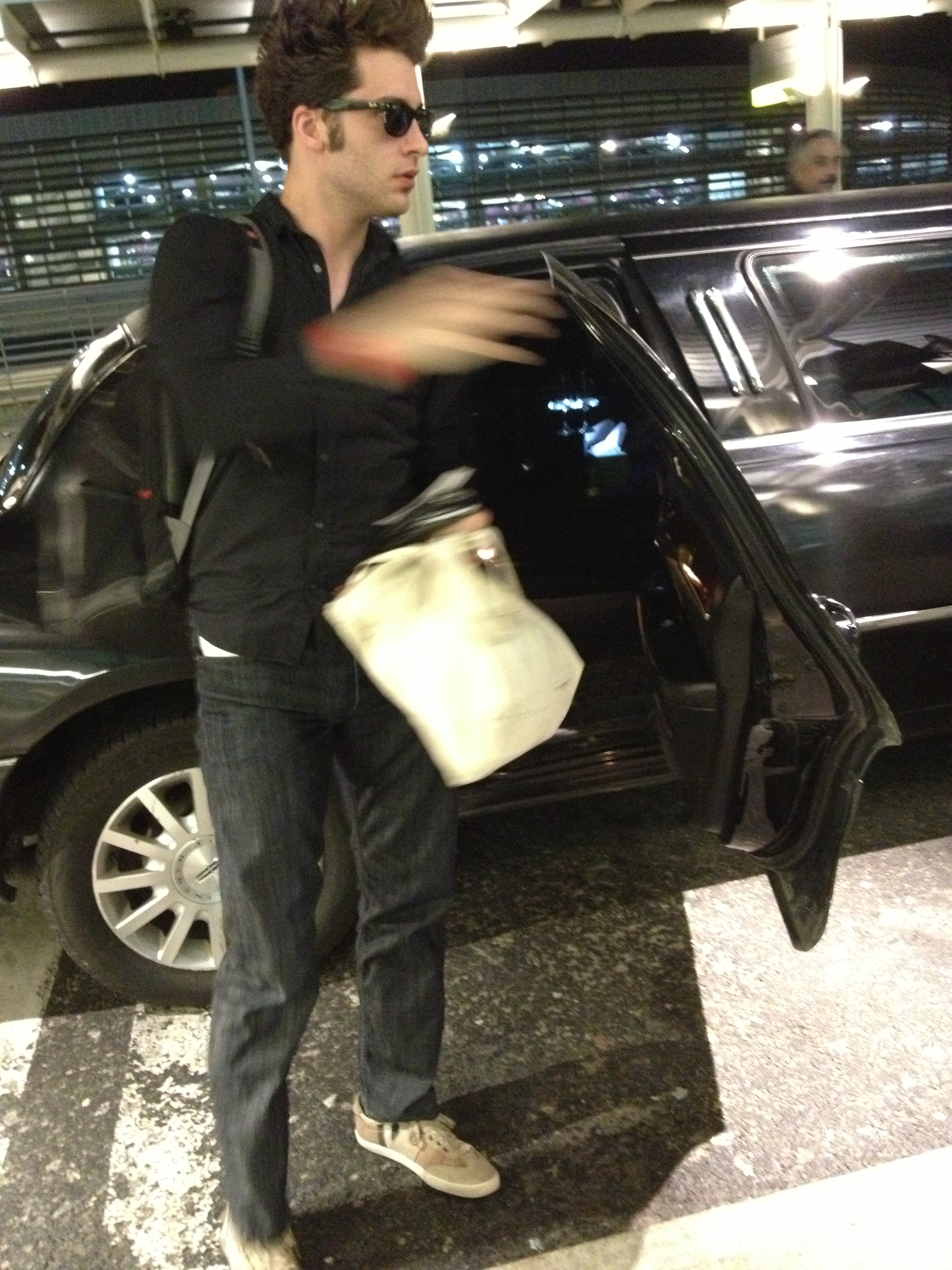
Larsen in Toronto, Canada in April 2013.

On October 10, 2007, Larsen announced on his official website that he intended to disband Twilight's Moon and stated that he was in the process of writing and recording music under his own name. The resulting album, Breaking, was released on August 4, 2009, to mostly positive reviews. In the summer of 2009, Larsen assembled a permanent touring band composed of guitarist Anne Muntuerto (of the Philippines-based band Cattski), bassist Devon Eason, and session drummer Lydia Lewis. Brian and his band toured the United States through the end of 2009, and Larsen (sometimes accompanied by Muntuerto) toured the country again, performing acoustic version of his songs during the first half of 2010, including a Los Angeles charity concert on the evening before the 52nd Grammy Awards to benefit victims of the 2010 Haiti earthquake.

In 2010 Larsen announced via his Twitter account that he was in the process of writing and recording his 10th album. In November 2010, a YouTube video was released announcing that the album would be titled "Building". It was released on April 17, 2012, and was Larsen's first album to earn a Parental Advisory warning for explicit lyrics. In late 2012, Larsen announced via a YouTube video that he was in the process of recording another album of new material. It was later announced that the album would be titled Being. In late 2025, Larsen released his first new single in nearly 15 years, titled "It's Right."

== Business ==
In 2014, Larsen created the company RestoraPet with Kenny Kramm, the founder and former CEO of FLAVORx. Larsen was inspired to start the business after witnessing the death of his childhood Siberian Husky. The company develops and manufactures over the counter supplements for dogs, cats, and horses. The products were invented and researched by Larsen, who has a background in chemistry and pharmacology. After Kramm's death in 2016, Larsen took over as president and CEO of RestoraPet, growing the company's sales to $2 million in 2019 and $10 million in 2020. Larsen holds an MBA from the University of Virginia Darden School of Business. In April, 2020 amidst shortages of personal protective equipment during the COVID-19 pandemic, RestoraPet began producing hand sanitizer to donate to hospitals and nursing homes. Larsen's company, RestoraPet, was listed as the #1 fastest growing pet company in the US and the 218th fastest growing of all businesses in the US in the 2021 Inc. 5000 list.

== Discography ==
=== Albums ===
Year	Album
1997	Pi
1998	The Classics
1999	The Slope
2001	ClockWork
2001	Emergency Exit
2002	Close to Me (EP)
2003	Electric
2003	Broken Windows
2004	Mind Candy (Soundtrack)
2007	In The Meantime
2009	Breaking
2012	Building
2021	Being

=== Singles ===
Year	Song	Album
1997	"Picture (in my Mind)"	Pi
1999	"Zoo II"	The Slope
2000	"I Have My Doubts"	ClockWork
2000	"Can't Walk Away"	ClockWork
2001	"Circles on the Water"	ClockWork
2001	"The Game"	ClockWork
2001	"I Should Know"	ClockWork
2001	"Anyway"	Emergency Exit
2001	"I'm Not Your Psychiatrist"	Emergency Exit
2002	"Sunday Funday"	Emergency Exit
2002	"Close to Me"	Close to Me (EP)
2002	"Electric"	Electric
2003	"Casino"	Electric
2003	"I Tried"	Broken Windows
2004	"1,000 Other Things"	Broken Windows
2004	"I'm Letting You Go"	Broken Windows
2004	"Mind Candy"	Mind Candy (soundtrack)
2004	"Kelly"	Mind Candy (soundtrack)
2005	"In The Fall"	The Last of the Romantics
2006	"Goodnight"	The Last of the Romantics
2006	"In the Summer"	The Last of the Romantics
2006	"I Tried"	The Last of the Romantics
2006	"Kelly (Remix)"	The Last of the Romantics
2007	"In The Meantime"	In The Meantime (EP)
2007	"In The Fall (2007 Version)"	In The Meantime (EP)
2007	"Slip Away"	In The Meantime (EP)
2009	"Hang On"	Breaking
2010	"Frozen"	Breaking
2011	"Hold Me Down"	Breaking
2011	"Stand My Ground"	Breaking
2012	"How Long?"	Building
2025	"It's Right"	It's Right
