= Penitent Peak =

Mountain in Antarctica

Penitent Peak (67°52′S 67°14′W) is a peak between Mount Breaker and Ryan Peak on Horseshoe Island. Surveyed by Falkland Islands Dependencies Survey (FIDS) in 1955-57 and so named because of the snow penitents which are a characteristic feature in the vicinity of the peak.
