= Break in =

Break in or break-in may refer to:

- Burglary, the criminal act of entering a building to commit an offense, usually theft
- Breaking in a horse, the first step of training a horse
- Break-in (mechanical run-in), a procedure for preparing new equipment (such as vehicle engines) for the rest of its working life by running it under prescribed conditions at the beginning
- Trespass, the act of intruding another's property
- Break In, a 1989 Japanese video game
- Break-in (Death Note episode)
- Break-in (film), a 1927 German film
- Break-in record, a type of novelty record using samples of popular music, developed by producer Dickie Goodman

== See also ==
- Breaking (disambiguation)
- Breaking In (disambiguation)
- Break (disambiguation)
