= Braken =

Braken may refer to:

- Braken Hamlet, a hamlet in Wuustwezel, Belgium
- Bracken (Swedish: bräken), a genus of ferns
- Braken Bat Cave meshweaver, a species of spider

== See also ==
- Bracken County, Kentucky, United States
- Broken (disambiguation)
- Brake (disambiguation)
- Break (disambiguation)
