= Mind Candy =

Mind Candy can refer to:

- Mind Candy (album), album by Brian Larsen
- Mind Candy (company), the video game developer of Moshi Monsters
- Mind Candy (show), show by mentalist Wayne Hoffman
- "Mind Candy" (song), a song on the album Boom by Walker Hayes
