= Breakers =

Breakers may refer to:

== Geography ==
- A breaking wave on water

== Arts and entertainment ==
- Breakers, from the Dark Tower books
- Breakers, an Australian television series
- The Breakers (American band), a 1960s garage rock band
- The Breakers (Danish band), a rock band active 2002–2012
- Breakers, a 1985 novel by Martin Walser
- Breakers, a 2011 album by Gem Club
- "Breakers", a 2012 song by Local Natives
- Orlando Breakers, a fictional National Football League team in the TV series Coach
- New York City Breakers, a professional pioneer Breaking and B-boy crew or group

== Video games ==
- Breakers (1986 video game), a 1986 text adventure video game by Broderbund
- Breakers (1996 video game), a 1996 fighting arcade game by Visco
  - Breakers Revenge, a 1998 updated version of the 1996 game by Visco
- Dawn of the Breakers, a 2018 free-to-play action-adventure game by CyberStep

== Sports ==
=== United States ===
- Bay State Breakers, a Junior A ice hockey team in the Eastern Junior Hockey League, based in Rockland, Massachusetts
- Boston Breakers (WPSL Elite), a professional soccer team in Women's Professional Soccer
- Boston Breakers (WUSA) (2000-2003), a former professional soccer team in Women's United Soccer Association
- Daytona Beach Breakers, a defunct ice hockey team in the Sunshine Hockey League (1992-1995) and the Southern Hockey League (1995-1996)
- Long Beach Breakers (2001-2003), a defunct minor league baseball team in Long Beach, California
- North Bay Breakers (1994-1995), a defunct soccer team in Santa Rosa, California
- Northeast Pennsylvania Breakers, a former member of the American Basketball Association (2005) and the United States Basketball League (2006)
- Orange County Breakers, a World TeamTennis franchise, named the Newport Beach Breakers from 2003 to 2011
- Portland Breakers (1985), a former United States Football League team
- Rhode Island Breakers, a upcoming team in the United Football League
- Santa Barbara Breakers, a team in the West Coast Pro Basketball League
- Santa Cruz County Breakers (2007-2008), a defunct soccer team
- Seattle Breaker, former name (1977-1985) of the Seattle Thunderbirds, a Western Hockey League team
- Southern California Breakers, a former team in the Independent Women's Football League based in Orange County, California

=== Australia and New Zealand ===
- Newcastle Breakers FC, a defunct football club (1991-2000) of Newcastle, New South Wales
  - Breakers Stadium, now known as The Gardens Greyhound and Sporting Complex
- New South Wales Breakers, a team in the Women's National Cricket League
- New Zealand Breakers, a team in the Australian National Basketball League
- Queensland Breakers, a club water polo team

=== Canada ===
- British Columbia Breakers, an ice hockey team in the National Women's Hockey League
- Cape Breton Breakers (1993-1994), a defunct National Basketball League team

== Buildings ==
- The Breakers (hotel), Palm Beach, Florida
- Breakers Hotel (Long Beach, California)
- Hotel Breakers, Sandusky, Ohio
- The Breakers, a mansion in Newport, Rhode Island
  - The Breakers (1878), the original estate at that site

== Electricity ==
- Breakers, a colloquial expression for circuit breaker

== See also ==
- Breaker (disambiguation)
