= Ryan Peak =

Ryan Peak may refer to:

- Ryan Peak (Antarctica)
- Ryan Peak (Idaho)
