= Break =

Break or Breaks or The Break may refer to:

== Time off from duties ==
=== Time off from school ===
- Holiday break, a U.S. term for various school holidays
- Christmas break or Winter break, a break in the winter, typically around Christmas and New Years
- Spring break, a recess in early spring at universities and schools in various countries in the northern hemisphere
- Summer break, a typical long break in the summertime

=== Time off from other duties ===
- Recess (break), time in which a group of people is temporarily dismissed from its duties
- Break (work), time off during a shift/recess
  - Coffee break, a short mid-morning rest period in business
- Annual leave (holiday/vacation), paid time off work

== People ==
- Ted Breaks (1919–2000), English professional footballer
- Danny Breaks (active 1990s–), British drum and bass DJ, record producer and record label owner
- Jim Breaks (1940–2023), English professional wrestler

== Sport ==
- Break, the first shot meant to break the balls in cue sports, also a series of shots in snooker
- Breaking ball, a pitch that does not travel straight like a fastball as it approaches the batter
- Surf break, place where a wave collapses into surf
- Horse breaking, the process of training a horse to be ridden
- Break (tennis), to win a tennis game as the receiving player or team, thereby breaking serve

== Technology ==
=== Computing ===
- Break condition, in asynchronous serial communication
- Break key, a special key on computer keyboards
- break statement, a keyword in computer programming used to execute an early exit from a loop
- Line break (computing), a special character signifying the end of a line of text
- To break (or "crack") an encryption cipher, in cryptanalysis

=== Other technologies ===
- Brake (carriage), a type of horse-drawn carriage used in the 19th and early 20th centuries
- Break (locksmithing), a separation between pins of a lock
- Breakover angle, a maximum possible supplementary angle of terrain
- Paradelta Break, an Italian paraglider design

== Arts and media ==
=== Books ===
- The Break (Giovanni novel), 1957, by José Giovanni
- The Break (Vermette novel), 2016, by Katherena Vermette
- The Breaks (novel), 1983, by Richard Price

=== Film, television and theatre ===
==== Titled works and characters ====
- Break (2008 film), an American action film
- Break (2014 film), also known as Nature Law
- Break (2020 film), a British independent film
- The Break (play), 1962, by Philip Albright
- The Break (1963 film), a drama starring Tony Britton
- The Break (1995 film), an American tennis film
- The Break, alternative name for the 1997 film A Further Gesture
- The Break, a 2003 TV film featuring Kris Kristofferson
- The Break, a short film shown at the 2016 Dublin International Film Festival
- The Break (TV series), a 2016 Belgian crime drama, also known as La Trêve
- The Break with Michelle Wolf, a 2018 Netflix series
- The Breaks (1999 film), an American comedy
- The Breaks (2016 film), an American television hip-hop drama
  - The Breaks (TV series), a 2017 American drama and a continuation of the 2016 film
- "Break", a 1995 episode of the British television series Bottom
- Break (Transformers), a fictional character

==== Other uses in film, television and theatre ====
- To break character (or "corpse"), to lose composure during comedic scenes

=== Music ===
==== Albums ====
- Break (Enchant album), 1998
- Break (Mamoru Miyano album), 2009
- Break (One-Eyed Doll album), 2010
- Break (EP), 2006, by The Cinematics

==== Songs ====
- "Break", 1972, by Aphrodite's Child
- "The Breaks" (song), 1980, by Kurtis Blow
- "Break" (1984), by Play Dead
- "Break" (1996), by Staind from Tormented
- "Break" (1998), by Fugazi from End Hits
- "Break" (2002), by Jurassic 5 from Power in Numbers
- "Break" (2006), by Republic of Loose from Aaagh!
- "Break" (2006), by The Cinematics
- "Break" (2008), by Alanis Morissette from Flavors of Entanglement
- "Break" (Three Days Grace song) (2009)
- "Break" (2013), by Hostyle Gospel from Desperation
- "Break" (2015), by Katherine McPhee from Hysteria
- "Break" (2015), by No Devotion from Permanence
- "Break" (Kero Kero Bonito song), 2016

==== Other uses in music ====
- Break (music), a percussion interlude or instrumental solo within a longer work of music
- Breakbeat, a broad style of electronic or dance-oriented music

=== Other media ===
- Break.com, a humor website

== Other uses ==
- Big break (jargon), a circumstance which allows an actor or musician to "break into" the industry and achieve fame
- Bone fracture, a medical condition in which there is a break in the continuity of the bone
- Commercial break, in television and radio
- Prison escape, the act of an inmate leaving prison through unofficial or illegal ways
- Section break, in type setting
- Break, an air combat maneuver; see Basic fighter maneuvers
- Breaks, Virginia
- Psychotic break
- The Breaks, named for an American topography that appears to "break away" from the Missouri River, in Upper Missouri River Breaks National Monument

== See also ==
- Brake (disambiguation)
- Break a leg, an expression in theatre
- Breakdancing
- Breaking (disambiguation)
- Breakwater (structure)
- Broke (disambiguation)
- Burglary, sometimes called a "break-in"
- Winter break (disambiguation)
