= Lift Off (sculpture) =

Public artwork in Washington, D.C. by David Black

- Artist: David Black
- Year: 2009
- Dimensions: 5.8 m × 12 m × 8.8 m (19 ft × 39 ft × 29 ft)
- Location: Washington, D.C., United States; 38°54′9.76″N 77°1′7.55″W
- Owner: D.C. Commission on the Arts and Humanities

Lift Off is a public artwork by American artist David Black, located at the CityVista Condominium at the intersection of 5th St NW & K St NW in the Mount Vernon Triangle neighborhood of Washington, D.C., United States. Lift Off was created through DC Commission on the Arts and Humanities.

== Description ==
Lift Off is a yellow, canopy like, abstract sculpture that sits on the corner of the CityVista building in front of Busboys and Poets. A welded (3/8-inch x 1/2-inch) aluminum plate with four crossbeams form the main skeleton of the work. Each crossbeam features a small floodlight on the end which illuminates the scallop like, origami inspired parts.

The sculpture's "Love Seat"

A small love seat is placed at the central base for visitors to relax and immerse themselves within the artwork, which is easily accessible to visitors who are encouraged to interact with the piece. The work was inspired by children flying kites at the Smithsonian Kite Festival.

== Acquisition ==
David Black was chosen by a collaboration led by the DC Commission on the Arts & Humanities, the Office of City Planning, Mount Vernon Triangle Community Improvement District and community organizers. $250,000 was acquired to fund the design, creation and installation of the work. A reason cited for selecting the work was that it inspired interaction and use of the new neighborhood plaza.

== Installation ==
Concrete footings were installed in 2008 and the sculpture's installation began in November 2009.

== Dedication ==
The second work of art commissioned for the CityVista condominium complex, Lift Off was dedicated, alongside Inspiration by Ethan Kerber, on April 6, 2010.

== David Black ==
Black is known for his pavilion like works, which incorporate architectural design with traditional sculptural methods.

Discussing the work Lift Off, Black stated: "The sculpture appears kinetic as one passes by – reflecting the spirit and vibrancy of the new neighborhood,".

== Community Reception ==
All Busboys and Poets locations feature public artworks, and when asked about his views on the new artwork, restaurant owner Andy Shallal stated that:

Public art is a way to connect those living in a neighborhood with each other's humanity. It soothes the soul, lifts the spirit and touches everyone who passes by in a way nothing else can. Having such grand art next to Busboys and Poets has forever defined the corner of 5th and K, NW in the boldest of terms.

Neighborhood blogs erupted upon the works selection and installation. The work has been described as an "unfinished building construction, clad in taxi cab yellow, on steroids." However, neighborhood response has been generally positive, celebrating the fact that the work helps define the location of CityVista, the Mount Vernon neighborhood, and provides a unique meeting spot. In December 2010, the sculpture was used as the site for children to get photographs with Santa Claus for the holidays.

== See also ==
- List of public art in Washington, D.C., Ward 2
