= David Black (sculptor) =

American sculptor (1928–2023)

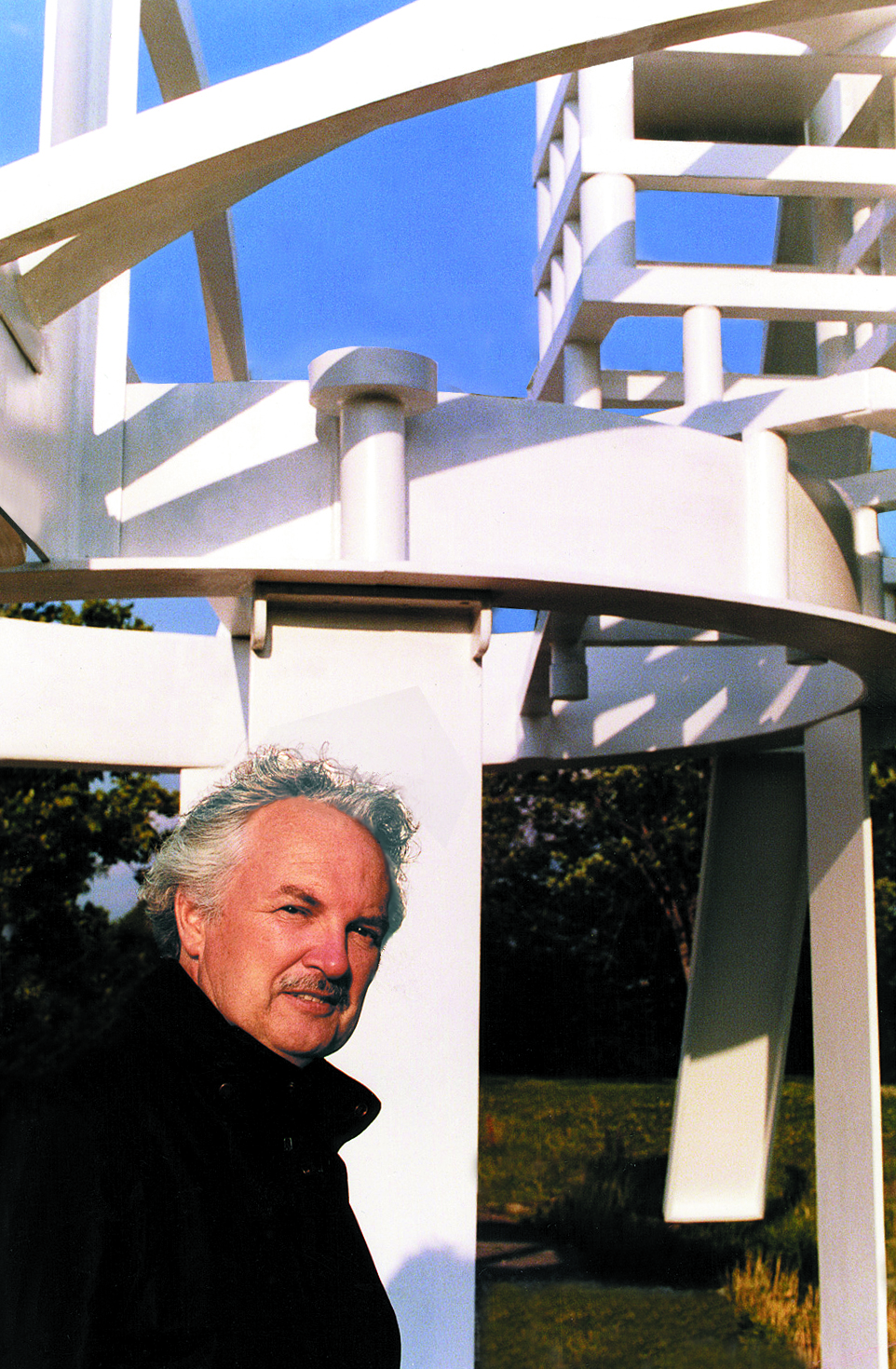
- Black, in front of his piece, Wind Point
- Born: May 29, 1928; Gloucester, Massachusetts, U.S.
- Died: September 5, 2023 (aged 95); Grandview Heights, Ohio, U.S.
- Occupation: Sculptor
- Notable work: Public Sculpture
- Spouse: Karlita Black
- Website: http://davidblacksculpture.com

David Black (May 29, 1928 – September 5, 2023) was an American sculptor known for his pioneering use of plastics and his monumental, aluminum, large-scale public sculptures.

== Early life and artistic career ==
David Black was born in 1928 on the island of Gloucester, Massachusetts, whose ocean seascape, granite shoreline and iconic white lighthouses, churches and ships were to dominate his work his entire career. He later revealed that a near death experience as a very young child after falling from a tree, was a driving force in his lifelong obsession with archaic, spiritual forms and architecture.

Black left Cape Ann in 1946 to study science at Wesleyan University. During the summers he returned to work as a lifeguard on Gloucester's Wingaersheek Beach where he met sculptor George Aarons, who had a studio in the sand dunes nearby. The experience made such an impression, that two years into college, he changed his major to art, embarking on a career as a sculptor. The summer of 1949 Black attended the Skowhegan School of Painting and Sculpture, which solidified his choice to pursue art.

For the first 12 years, he made exclusively ceramic pottery and sculptures, winning the First Prize for Ceramics at the American Crafts Museum in New York in 1957. Later he received fellowships that took him to other countries and ancient cultures. A Fulbright fellowship grant in 1962 allowed him to live a year and a half in Florence, Italy, investigating ancient Etruscan art, making sculptures(in the former studio of Leonardo da Vinci) and having them cast in bronze in nearby Pistoia.

While further investigating the monumental structures, this time of ancient Meso-America, he set up a temporary studio in Mexico in 1966, casting in aluminum and designing wall-hangings to be woven in wool by local, Indigenous weavers.

Black's first breakthrough came with his use of plastic as a complete and significant art form with his “receptors of light”. Naum Gabo had previously investigated transparency through glass a half century before and a few artists had used plastics inadvertently, but Black is widely credited as being the first to use the commonplace, industrial material to its full potential in “fully imaginative forms”, a “pure plastic esthetic” building his own vacu-form machines to mold and shape sheets of Plexiglas, later through the lamination of layers of Plexiglas with epoxy resin, which added the quality of refracted light, and lastly, in his transparent Black Edge Series.

In 1970, he received the two-year Artist in Residence grant from DAAD, the German Academic Exchange, to live in then West-Berlin, Germany. There, the Neue Nationalgalerie (New National Gallery), commissioned the monumental sculpture, Skypiece, for its courtyard fountain and held an exhibition of his sculpture at the Amerika Haus, Berlin. He returned again in 1977 for a one-man-exhibition in the Neue Nationalgalerie. This exhibition was shown as well at the Wilhelm Lehmbruck Museum in Duisburg, Germany.

Returning to the United States, Black received an “Individual Artist Grant” from the National Endowment of the Arts while being awarded a full professorship at the Ohio State University. It was at this time, around 1980, that he began producing monumental, abstract public sculpture, working again in metal, this time with massive plates of industrial aluminum.

== Public sculpture ==
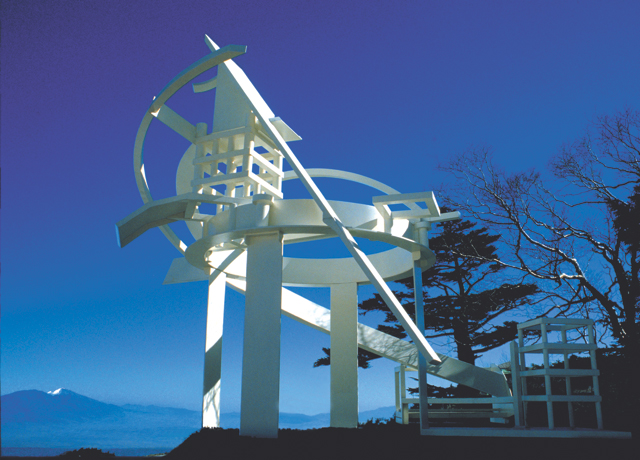
'Windpoint', sculpture by David Black, Utsukushi-ga-hara Art Museum, Japan

More than 40 major sculptures, most the result of winning open competitions, are installed throughout the US, as well as in Germany, Japan and Canada. Black describes his work as “proto-architecture,” a reference to his fusion of archetypal architectural motifs, such as columns, pillars, arches, and the use of light with the energy and references of sculpture. His community landmarks engage their environments and the viewer spatially, as well as culturally, strongly connecting with the viewer as they move through and around the work.

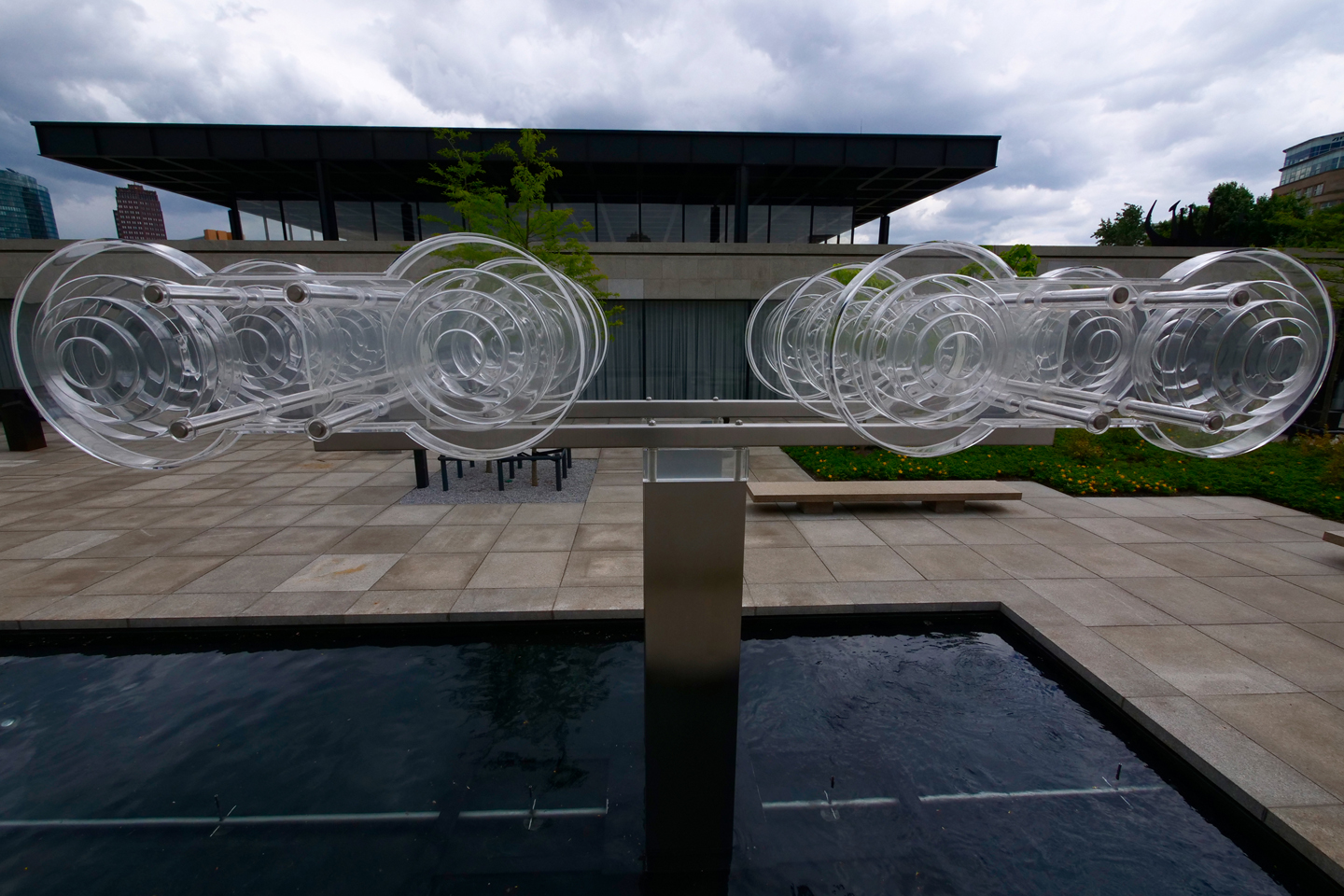
'Skypiece', sculpture by David Black, New National Gallery, Berlin, Germany

Some examples of his most important work include:

Black's monumental sculpture Wind Point won the Shikanai, First Prize in the Henry Moore International Sculpture Competition in Nagano, Japan in 1985. It is permanently installed atop a mountain at the entrance to the Utsukushi-ga-hara Art Museum.

His Flyover in Dayton, a stainless steel “flight path” arch 46 meters long (150 feet) and five stories tall, commemorating the Wright Brothers’ first flight in 1903, won an international competition and was awarded the “Meritorious Structure Award” from the National Council of Structural Engineers Associations in 1999. In 2010–2011, David Black finished two major public sculptures: Liftoff in Downtown Washington, D.C., and Fire Dance in Fort Myers.

Black's sculpture Skypiece has recently been restored and rebuilt as the permanent fountain centerpiece for the reopening of Mies van der Rohe's New National Gallery in Berlin in the summer of 2021.

== Death ==
Black died at his home in Grandview Heights, Ohio, on September 5, 2023, at the age of 95.

== Recognition ==
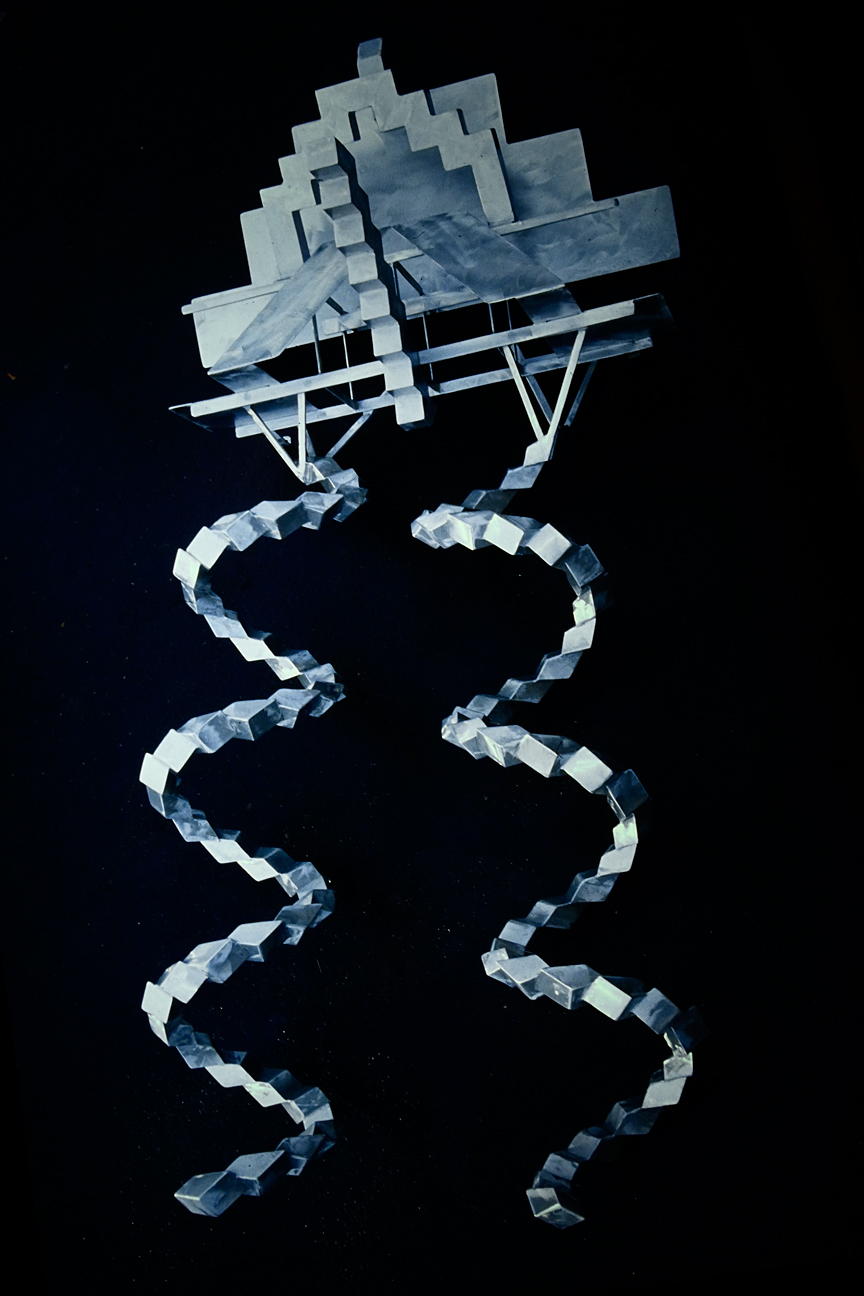
'Uxmal', sculpture by David Black

=== Recognition for monumental public sculptures ===
New York art critic Donald Kuspit, writes in a printed essay about Black's public sculptures: "They are remarkable for their sense of elation – a novelty in public space-and dynamics, which makes them an exciting environment unto themselves, even as they anchor the environment they inhabit, humanizing it in the process…" Of all the artists now that I know of, who make works that are meant for public space, David Black is, to my mind, unequivocally the most important.

Hilton Kramer writes in a New York Times review: "his forms have an admirable definition, almost a simplicity, which is yet the result of a certain metaphorical development and resolution (...). It is as a sculptor, with a real feeling for his craft, that Mr. Black makes an impression.”

Thalia Gouma-Petyerson writes in the magazine Sculpture Outdoors about Black's predilection for the color white: "he is ‘enamored of white objects partly because of their commonness and partly because of a sacred quality. With his sculptures, he tries to create a bridge between the common and the sacred."

Robert A. Malone, former Dean of The Pratt Institute, also comments on the spiritual quality of Black's work: "His sculpture is transcendent in the same way that good music can be transcendent, not in the religious sense of being parochial."

“With grace, wit and no small measure of style, David Black acknowledges that maturity has enriched his art and liberated his working procedures. The constraints of career building are now behind him and a new sense of freedom has unleashed creative powers that are driving him toward more ambitious projects. A recent outpouring of ideas has led to a series of monumentally scaled, publicly destined sculptures that are startling in originality, but intimately integrated as a body of work…” – Ruth K. Myer, Director of the Taft Museum.

=== Recognition for the use of plastics in sculpture ===
Critics in the 1970s, celebrated Black as a pioneer for the use of plastics in sculpture. For example, Heinz Ohff in “Das Kunstwerk” magazine considered it a highly significant coincidence, that Black's Berlin exhibition, in the New National Gallery, was shown parallel to the first large retrospective of Naum Gabo since the war: “Gabo was the first to produce –out of glass–transparent sculpture. Now it is evident that Black, although by no means in direct succession, has carried transparent sculpture to its aesthetic and technical perfection with the help of modern materials and techniques. One can see through them. The entire effect becomes unreal, because the colored sheets and bands which make up the sculptures, transform them, by their reflections and refractions, into a kind of transparent, translucent light-painting…”.

The magazine Das Bild-Berlin wrote "The American sculptor David Black is the first artist in the world to build his Plexiglas works in fully imaginative forms. With his sculpture "Stack", which reminds one of a modern skyscraper, and his work "Turn", he draws attention to the modern form-making issues of the 20th century."

"Plastics, relatively recent universal commodities, have become effective materials for the contemporary sculptor. Within the last few years, Nevelson and Judd have included plastics as appropriate materials for tri-dimensional expression sculpture. ...However, it has been David Black’s contribution to fully demonstrate the 20th century potential of plastics as fundamental, sculptural materials."

"The American artist, David Black, chose an unusual material for his works: Acrylic Plexiglas. Plexiglas is considered cold, impersonal, technical. What the American makes out of it, however, is anything but. Even his large spaces lose nothing of their lightness and buoyancy. His work seems to be attuned to light, which only gains in transparency and liveliness. The colors, discreetly chosen, often shine like crystals."

Success outside the United States also furthered recognition within his home country: "The transparency of the medium (Plexiglas) gives those monumental sculptures a deceptively delicate appearance. And the transparent surfaces toy with light in such a way that the pieces seem endowed with a strange and fascinating inner motion", wrote Jaqueline Hall in the Columbus Monthly in 1982, "The Germans were so impressed by his work that they commissioned a 20-foot sculpture for the reflecting pool of the West Berlin Museum of Modern Art, Die Neue Nationalgalerie. It is a striking piece which does great credit to the artist and through him to American art."

David Black's works have been exhibited in the U.S. at the Contemporaries Gallery and PS One, the Gilman Gallery, the Taft Museum, the Indianapolis Museum of Art, the Columbus Museum of Art, the University of Iowa Art Museum, the Dayton Art Institute, and in Germany at the Neue Nationalgalerie, the Amerika Haus and the Lehmbruck Museum.

== Public works ==
This is a list of artworks by David Black that are available to the public.

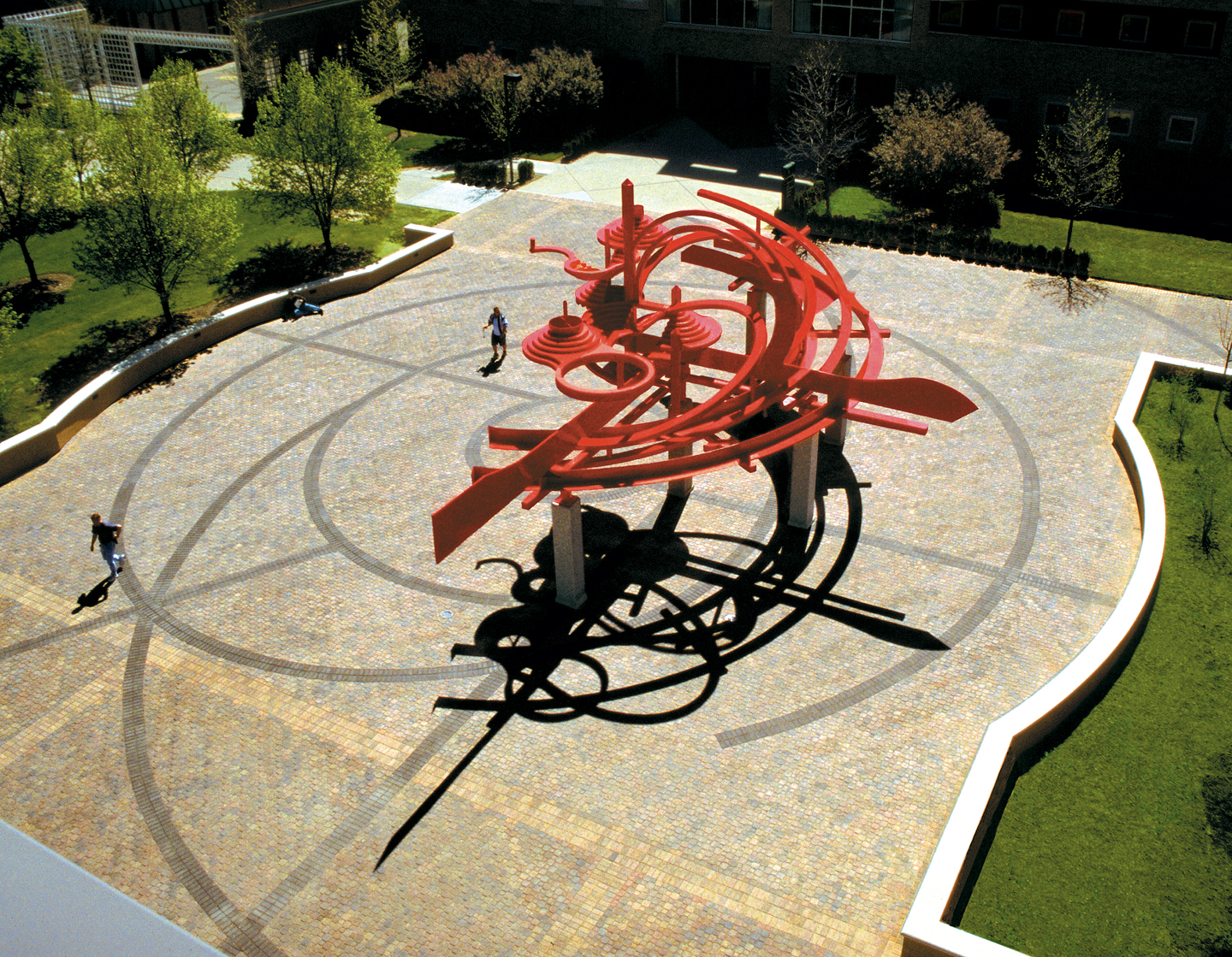
'Turning Points', sculpture by David Black

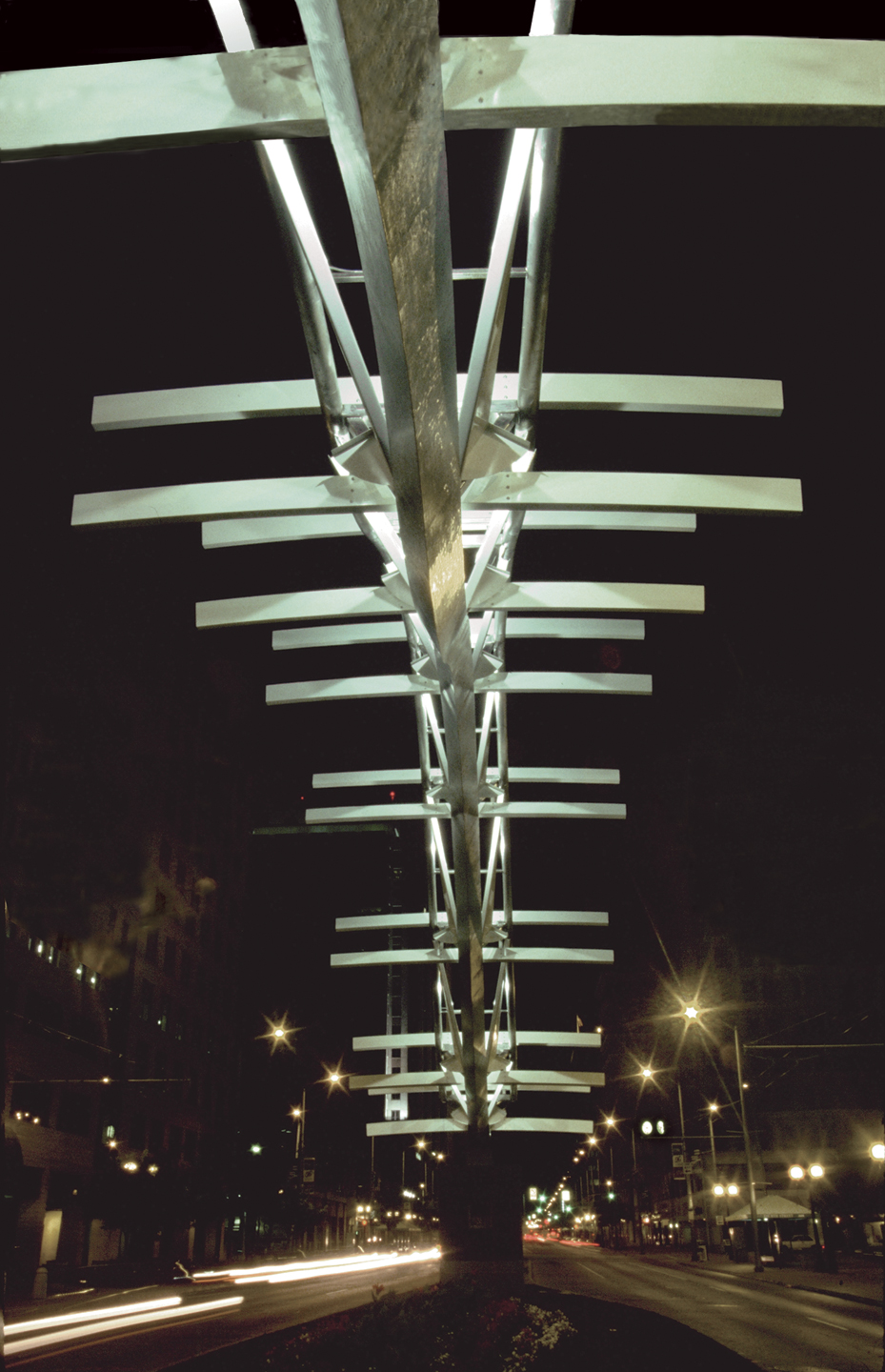
'Flyover', sculpture by David Black

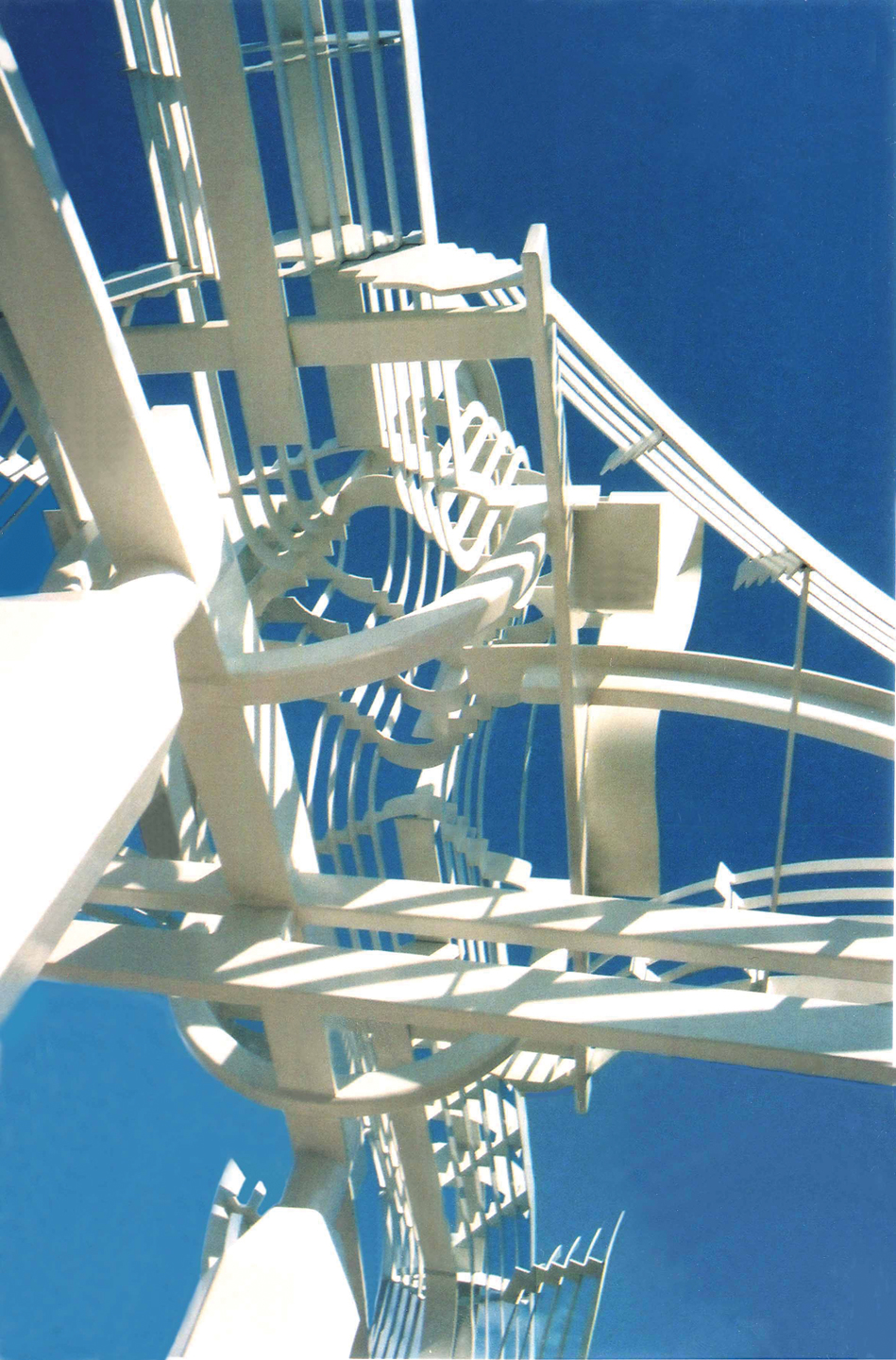
'Open Skies', sculpture by David Black, detail

=== United States ===
==== Alaska ====
- Open Skies, 2005, Hutchison Institute, University of Alaska, Fairbanks, Alaska

==== Arizona ====
- Sonora, 1991, Plaza, main library, Tucson, Arizona

==== California ====
- Jetty, 1990, Island Park, Belmont, California

==== Florida ====
- Fire Dance, 2011, Edison Circle, Centennial Park, Ft. Myers, FL

==== Indiana ====
- Crossings, 1984, Fort Wayne Museum of Art, Fort Wayne, Indiana
- Rotunda Fountain, 2000, Hammond, Indiana

==== Iowa ====
- Rapids, 1999, Cedar Rapids, Iowa

==== Michigan ====
- New Arcadia, 1987, College Park, Kalamazoo, Michigan
- Quadrant, 1988, Central Michigan University, Mt. Pleasant, Michigan

==== New York ====
- Portside, 1984, Clarkson University, Potsdam, New York

==== Ohio ====
- Breaker, 1982, Wexner Center for the Arts, Ohio State University, Columbus, Ohio
- Coastline, 1983, Case Western Reserve University, Cleveland, Ohio
- Ottawa Gate, 1994, Ottawa Park, Toledo, Ohio
- Euclid's Circle, 1995, University Circle, Euclid Ave. at Mayfield, Cleveland, Ohio
- Flyover, 1996, Dayton, Ohio
- Inner Circles, 1996, Youngstown State University, Youngstown, Ohio
- Viewpoint , 1997, Cincinnati State Technical and Community College, Columbus, Ohio
- Turning Points, 1998, Wright State University, Dayton, Ohio
- Outlook, 2007, Zanesville Art Center, Zanesville, Ohio

==== Washington D.C. ====
- Lift Off, 2009, City Vista Plaza, K St. at 5th St., Washington, D.C.

=== International ===
==== Japan ====
- Windpoint, 1985, Utsukushi-ga-Hara Museum, Nagano, Japan

==== Germany ====
- Skypiece, 1972 and rebuilt in 2021, Neue Nationalgalerie, Berlin

== See also ==
- Breaker (Black)
