= Brake (surname) =

Brake is a surname of English origin and may refer to:

- Brian Brake (1927–1988), New Zealand photographer
- Colin Brake (born 1963), English television writer and script editor
- John Brake (New Zealand rugby player) (born 1952), New Zealand rugby union player and coach
- John Brake (born 1988), English rugby union player
- Patricia Brake (1942–2022), English television actress
- Richard Brake, Welsh/American actor
- Tom Brake (born 1962), British politician

== See also ==
- Brake (disambiguation)
