= Breaking In =

Breaking In may refer to:

- Breaking In (1989 film), an American crime comedy
- Breaking In (2018 film), an American thriller
- Breaking In (TV series), a sitcom

== See also ==
- Break in (disambiguation)
