= Jody A. Breckenridge =

American Coast Guard admiral

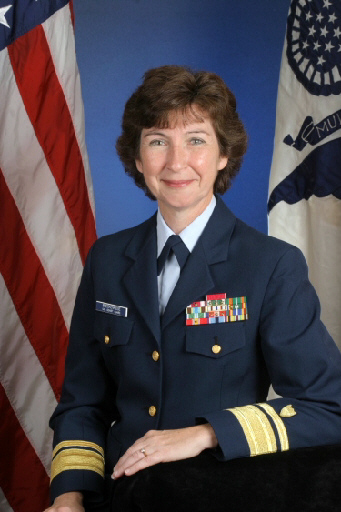
- Military career
- Allegiance: United States
- Branch: United States Coast Guard
- Rank: Vice admiral
- Commands: Coast Guard Pacific Area

Jody A. Breckenridge is a former commander of the U.S. Coast Guard's Pacific Area.

The area of operations for this command encompasses over 73,000,000 square miles (190,000,000 km^{2}) throughout the Pacific Basin to the Far East. Vice Admiral Breckenridge oversaw the operation of units performing missions in maritime safety, maritime mobility, protection of natural resources, maritime security, homeland security, and national defense. In addition, she oversaw two service level commands – the Deployable Operations Group and the Coast Guard Force Readiness Command.

== Early life and education ==
Breckenridge grew up as Jody Hinchion in Potomac, Maryland, the daughter of Elizabeth and Francis Arthur Hinchion, a graduate of the U.S. Military Academy at West Point. She graduated from Winston Churchill High School, then joined the Coast Guard in 1976. She received a Bachelor of Science degree in biology from Virginia Polytechnic Institute and State University, earned a master's degree in public policy from the University of Maryland and a Master of Science degree in national resource strategy from the Industrial College of the Armed Forces. While attending the University of Maryland, she was elected to the honor society of Phi Kappa Phi and was presented an Excellence in Scholarship award, graduating with honors. In 2007, she was honored with the University of Maryland Distinguished Alumnus Award.

== Career ==
Prior to her assignment as PACAREA commander, she served as the director, Strategic Transformation Team, where she was responsible for aligning and synchronizing the efforts to transform and modernize the Coast Guard. Simultaneously, she served as assistant commandant for human resources where she had oversight of the Coast Guard's HR professionals. From 2005 to 2006 Breckenridge served as commander of the Eleventh Coast Guard District in Alameda, California, overseeing Coast Guard operations in the Southwest states of California, Nevada, Utah, and Arizona, and the Eastern Pacific Ocean. During her tenure, the Eleventh District stepped up its inter-agency collaboration leading to record drug seizures including the MV Gatun, the largest maritime interdiction in US history, and the arrest of Francisco Javier Arellano Felix, head of the Arellano Felix drug cartel. Her initial flag assignment was as commander, Maintenance and Logistics Command Pacific, with responsibility for all mission support in the Pacific Theater.

Breckenridge graduated from Officer Candidate School in June 1976. Her first tour of duty was in the National Response Center, eventually as senior watchstander. Afterwards, she was assigned to the Pollution Response Branch of the Marine Environmental Protection Division at the Coast Guard Headquarters. During that time, she served as a White House social aide. For a short time, she was detailed to the Coast Guard Academy for the summer training program when women were first admitted to the academy.

In September 1979, Breckenridge reported to Group Seattle, where she served as the assistant port safety officer and was then selected as the first group operations officer. Subsequent duty assignments have included the Coast Guard Pay and Personnel Center, Coast Guard Headquarters, postgraduate school at the University of Maryland, chief of Officer Candidate School at Training Center Yorktown, Virginia, executive officer of Integrated Support Center Seattle, Coast Guard Personnel Command (chief, officer assignments), Industrial College of the Armed Services, the Coast Guard Personnel Command (assistant chief and chief, Officer Personnel Management Division), and commanding officer, Coast Guard Recruiting Command. While assigned to the Personnel Command, Breckenridge represented the Coast Guard on a five-month Department of Defense study entitled "The Officer Personnel Structure for the 21st Century". Breckenridge also served as the deputy chief of staff of the Coast Guard.

Since retirement, VADM Breckenridge has served on the board of the Marine's Memorial association, was chairman of the board of the Water Emergency Transportation Authority running the ferry service for the eastern shore of the San Francisco Bay. She is vice chairman of the San Francisco Fleet Week, serves on the board of the Association for Rescue At Sea, is a board member for the Council for a Strong America, and is on the board of directors for 1st Command Financial Services. She is currently on the board of visitors for the National Defense University, and serves as vice chairman for the California Governor's Military Council.

== Awards ==
Vice Admiral Breckenridge's awards include three Legion of Merits, the Meritorious Service Medal, four Coast Guard Commendation Medals, two Achievement Medals, the Commandant's Letter of Commendation, and four Meritorious Team Commendations.

- Legion of Merit with two Gold Stars
- Meritorious Service Medal
- Coast Guard Commendation Medal with three Gold Stars
- Coast Guard Achievement Medal with Gold Star
- Commandant's Letter of Commendation
- Meritorious Team Commendation with three gold Stars

For the service to the country since her retirement, in 2018 The Commandant of Coast Guard presented to her the Secretary of Homeland Security's Award for Outstanding Public Service.
