= Brake (disambiguation) =

A brake is a device which inhibits motion.

Brake may also refer to:

== Transportation ==
- Brake (carriage), a horse-drawn carriage used to train horses for draft work
- Railway brake
- Air brake (disambiguation)
  - Air brake (aeronautics), in aeronautics, a type of flight control system used on aircraft to reduce speed
  - Air brake (road vehicle), a type of brake used on large vehicles in place of hydraulic brakes, using compressed air
  - Railway air brake, a type of brake operated by compressed air and used on locomotives and railroad cars
- Hydraulic brake
- Dynamic braking
- Regenerative brake
- Electromagnetic brake
- Emergency brake (train)
- Parking brake
- Counter-pressure brake
- Drum brake
- Disc brake

== Places ==
- Brake, Lower Saxony, a city in Germany
- Brake, West Virginia
- Brake, a former independent city now incorporated into Lemgo, Germany

== Arts ==
=== Literature and film ===
- Brake (film), a 2012 action film starring Stephen Dorff
- Brakes (film), a 2016 British improvised comedy film
- "Brake" (Anderson), science fiction story by Poul Anderson

=== Music ===
- Brakes (band), an English rock band, known in the US as BrakesBrakesBrakes
- The Brakes, a rock band from Philadelphia
- "Brakes", a 2008 single from British pop rock band Royworld

== Other ==
- Brake, ferns of the genus Pteris
- Brake (sheet metal bending), a tool for bending sheet metal
- Brake (surname)
- Brake (charity) a road safety charity
- Brakes (company), a food distributor in the UK and France

== See also ==
- Braken (disambiguation)
- Break (disambiguation)
