= USS Breaker =

USS Breaker is a name used more than once by the U.S. Navy:

- USS Breaker (1862), a small schooner captured by the Union Navy during the American Civil War.
- USS Breaker (1901), wooden-hulled launch used as a ferry by the Navy.
- USS Breaker (ID-1707), a steam trawler constructed in 1912 at Quincy, Massachusetts.
