= Cattski =

- Born: Cattleya Vanessa Espina
- Genres: Electronica, digital folk, indie, acoustic, experimental
- Instruments: Guitar, keyboard, harmonica
- Years active: 2000–present
- Label: 22 Tango Records
- Website: https://www.facebook.com/CATTSKI/

Cattski (born Cattleya Vanessa Espina) is a singer-songwriter, musician, record producer and founder of independent record label 22 Tango Records and Music Publishing. Her record label currently hones 14 in-house talents with about 200 songs in its music catalogue. Operating hyper-locally, 22 Tango Records' sole purpose is to produce, promote, and distribute Cebuano music. Cattski is supported by institutional partners and major commercial establishments spread across the city. Her role in propagating the music culture on an industry level is evident in the platforms 22 Tango Records has opened including annual music summits, school tours, music makers' bootcamps and one-on-one sessions.

== Production work ==
Her body of work as a music producer includes the albums of the Wonggoys, Vincent Eco, Martina San Diego, and Mary Anchit. She is currently producing Lourdes Maglinte's debut, Bethany's sophomore and the 3rd album by the Wonggoys.

In November 2017, Cattski opened Room Eleven Recording Studio, a specialized facility for quality audio production that is devoid of distractions and dedicated to professional development.

== Discography and musical history ==
She has released four full-length albums, the self-titled debut Cattski (2001), Vacuum My Inside (2004), Sound Mind Speaks Volumes (2009) and Zero (2012). Cattski came from a group of her namesake yet disbanded in the year 2010 after ten years of shared music and performances. In order to pay tribute to the band, she then released an anniversary compilation album, Cattski Ten, in 2010, which marked her new path as a solo artist. Recently performing under the name 'Mother Folker', Cattski is currently producing her 6th studio album while continuing to mentor musicians, widen the community, and pilot 22 Tango Records into realising the vision of making Cebu a destination for music.

== Albums ==
Cattski (2001)

Vacuum My Inside (2004)

Sound Mind Speaks Volumes (2009)

Cattski Ten (2010)

Zero (2012)
