= Air brake =

Air brake may refer to:

- Air brake (aeronautics), a type of flight control system used on aircraft to reduce speed
- On ground vehicles, (more formally, specified as) compressed-air-actuated braking systems:
  - Air brake (road vehicle), friction-mediated type of brake used on large road vehicles in place of hydraulic brakes
  - Railway air brake (used on both locomotives, and on towed or pushed cars)
