= Ted Breaks =

English footballer (1919–2000)

Personal information
- Full name: Edward Breaks
- Date of birth: 29 December 1919
- Place of birth: Halifax, England
- Date of death: November 2000 (aged 80) (Note: Hugman's Footballers lists the date of death as 3 November, whereas Johnny Meynell's book has 9 November.)
- Place of death: Halifax, England
- Position: Left back

Youth career
- Copley U18
- Siddal

Senior career*
Years	Team	Apps	(Gls)
- Shaw Lodge Mills
1947–1955	Halifax Town	179	(1)
- Hebden Bridge
- * Club domestic league appearances and goals

Edward Breaks (29 December 1919 – November 2000) was an English professional footballer who played in the Football League as a left back for Halifax Town.

== Life and career ==
Breaks was born in 1919 in Halifax, in the West Riding of Yorkshire. He worked at John Holdsworth & Co textile mills in the town before the Second World War. He was called up in 1940, served with the 7th Queen's Own Hussars, and had a narrow escape when the tank he was driving was struck by a German shell. He played football while in the services, captained his regimental team, and after demobilisation he returned to Holdsworth's and played for the Shaw Lodge Mills works team. Breaks joined Halifax Town on amateur forms in 1947, and became a part-time professional a year later: he thought he was too old to take the risk of embarking on a full-time professional career.

The team started the 1948–49 season badly, and Breaks was promoted from the reserves. He made his senior debut on 13 September 1948 against Mansfield Town in the Third Division North. Although the team continued to struggle, Breaks did not. Over the next seven seasons – four as a first-team regular – he made 179 appearances in the Football League Third Division North, and was spoken of as a possible replacement at Southampton after Alf Ramsey's move to Tottenham Hotspur. He scored once, when he injured a knee against Crewe Alexandra in 1950: unable to play in defence, he was still able to wander about the forward line. He shared a benefit match with the equally long-serving David McCormick in April 1955, in which Halifax Town lost 10–4 to a Football League Select XI which included their own player-manager, Willie Watson. Breaks became reserve-team coach in 1956, and acted as first-team trainer after Alan Ure retired in January 1962. After manager Harry Hooper also left the club, Breaks followed suit during the 1962 close season.

Breaks returned to work at Holdsworth's, while continuing his involvement with football at local level with Hebden Bridge as player and coach and then as coach of St Mary's.

Breaks and his wife, Maureen, had a daughter, Christine. He died in a Halifax nursing home at the age of 80 in November 2000.

== Career statistics ==
Appearances and goals by club, season and competition
Club	Season	League			FA Cup		Total	
Club	Season	Division	Apps	Goals	Apps	Goals	Apps	Goals
Halifax Town	1948–49	Third Division North	34	0	2	0	36	0
Halifax Town	1949–50	Third Division North	39	1	1	0	40	1
Halifax Town	1950–51	Third Division North	45	0	1	0	46	0
Halifax Town	1951–52	Third Division North	40	0	1	0	41	0
Halifax Town	1952–53	Third Division North	11	0	0	0	11	0
Halifax Town	1953–54	Third Division North	8	0	0	0	8	0
Halifax Town	1954–55	Third Division North	2	0	0	0	2	0
Career total			179	1	5	0	184	1

== Sources ==
- Meynell, Johnny (2011). Halifax Town The Complete Record 1911–2011. Derby Books. ISBN 978-1-78091-321-6.
