= The Breaker (manhwa) =

South Korean comic series

- Cover of The Breaker volume 1, featuring Han Chun-woo

^브레이커
- Genre: Martial arts, drama
- Author: Jeon Geuk-jin
- Illustrator: Park Jin-hwan
- Publisher: Daewon C.I.
- Magazine: Young Champ
- Original run: 2007–2010
- Collected volumes: 10

Sequel(s)
- The Breaker: New Waves (2010–2015); The Breaker: Eternal Force (2022 - present)

The Breaker (Korean: 브레이커) is a South Korean manhwa series written by Jeon Geuk-jin and illustrated by Park Jin-hwan under the pen name Kamaro. The Breaker was serialized in Daiwon C.I.'s Young Champ's magazine between 2007 and 2010. A sequel, The Breaker: New Waves (브레이커NW), was published on Daum Communications online comics portal from 2010 to 2015. A second sequel, The Breaker: Eternal Force began serialization in 2022 as a webtoon.

== Plot ==
Chunwoo Han is a martial artist who earned the title of Nine Arts Dragon from the Murim, a secret martial arts society that exists in harmony with modern society. The Murim's government is the Martial Arts Alliance who has garnered Chunwoo's hatred by killing his martial arts teacher. In the present, Chunwoo Han transfers to a fictional school in Seoul for a mission given to him by the Black Forest Defense Group, an anti-government group who opposes the Martial Arts Alliance. At the school, he meets the protagonist Shiwoon Yi. To solve his bullying problem, Shiwoon has Chunwoo train him in martial arts. Chunwoo initiates his mission and frees Sosul, the head of the Sunwoo Clan, from the Martial Arts Alliance. As Chunwoo prepares to leave the country, the Martial Arts Alliance take Shiwoon hostage, forcing him to intervene. In the conflict, Chunwoo publicly renounces Shiwoon as his disciple and destroys his Qi-center which cripples his potential as a martial artist. In doing so, Shiwoon is no longer considered part of Murim and will be protected by law from martial artists who wish to take revenge on Chunwoo through Shiwoon. In the aftermath, Shiwoon is greeted by the Sunwoo Clan who reveal Sosul has named him as her successor.

The sequel The Breaker: New Waves continues with Shiwoon, who has declined his position as the head of the Sunwoo Clan. Meanwhile, the Martial Arts Alliance is losing its control over the world and a new group, acronymed SUC, begins terrorizing normal citizens under the name of the Nine Arts Dragon. Shiwoon becomes acquainted with Sera Kang who arranges a series of events and successfully restores Shiwoon's Qi-center. After learning about the existence of SUC, Shiwoon resolves to destroy them for tarnishing his teacher's name.

=== Characters ===
Shiwoon Yi (이시운; I Siun)

Shiwoon was a weak and cowardly boy who was constantly bullied. After meeting with Chunwoo Han and learning he can't be overly dependent on others, Shiwoon begins to improve himself, becoming more convicted to his sense of justice. In order to fix his body's weak Qi, Shiwoon ingests the One Moon Divine Pill (일월신단; Ilwolsindan). Shiwoon is revealed to be a martial arts genius as he is able to learn techniques quickly. He is taught the Black Heaven and Earth Techniques (현천지공; Hyeoncheonjigon) by Chunwoo. During the course of the series, Shiwoon is instated as the head of the Sunwoo Clan. His Qi center is destroyed in The Breaker which prevents him from doing martial arts but is repaired over the course of New Waves.

Chunwoo Han (한천우; Han Cheonu)

Chunwoo is the last user of the Black Heaven and Earth Techniques. He earned the title of Nine Arts Dragon in a Murim tournament after defeating the other Arts Dragons. Because of his victory, his teacher, Unwol (은월; Eunwol), was killed by the Martial Arts Alliance out of spite. He joins the Black Forest Defense group as he intends to destroy the Martial Arts Alliance to avenge his master. He enters Shiwoon Yi's school to infiltrate Seoul for a mission and touched by Shiwoon's conviction, teaches him martial arts for a month before leaving Seoul. His lover, Shiho Lee is killed by the Martial Arts Alliance, furthering his hatred.

Sunwoo Clan

- Sosul (소설; Soseol) was the previous head of the Sunwoo Clan. She was held captive by the Martial Arts Alliance in order to control the Sunwoo Clan who were gaining political power equal to them. She is a teenager but has the appearance of a child because she is born with the Nine Yin Type Body. Chunwoo and the Black Forest Defense group free her from her captivity where she meets Shiwoon and develops a crush on him. She gave Shiwoon the Phoenix Medallion, essentially making him head of the Sunwoo Clan.
- Jaekyu Kwon (권재규; Gwon Jaegyu) is one of the elders of the Sunwoo Clan. He is the grandfather and guardian to Jini following her mother's death. Initially, he intended to manipulate Shiwoon in order to rule and restore the Sun-Woo clan but came to have a change of heart after witnessing Shiwoon's conviction during a fight to protect Jini.
- Jangil Jeon (전장일; Jeonjangil) is an elder of the Sunwoo and grandfather figure to Shiwoon. During Shiwoon's fight against SUC., he sacrificed himself to save him. The other elders are Saoak Min and Suljoong Kim.
- Gyubum Yi (이규범; I Gyubeom) is part of the Sunwoo clan. His skills earned him the title of Southern Red Star. He acts as Shiwoon's escort in New Waves.
- Jini Kwon (권지니; Gwon Jini) is the granddaughter of Jaekyu, an elder of the Sun-Woo Clan. She was Shiwoon's bodyguard and becomes infatuated with him as the story progresses.
- Hail Kang (강하일; Gang Haeil) is a member of the Sunwoo Clan.

Martial Arts Alliance

- The Alliance Chief in The Breaker is never referred to by name. He caused the death of Chunwoo's teacher out of spite. His desire for the Black Heaven and Earth Techniques caused him to lose his position after he attempted to use hostages to convince Chun-Woo to teach him the techniques.
- Kangsung (강성; Gang Seong) is a martial artist who stopped at the Three Arts Dragon rank out of respect for the Martial Arts Alliance. He becomes the Alliance Head after the events of The Breaker.
- Sochun Hyuk (혁소천; Hyeok Socheon) is the acting head of the Heavenly Way School. He is a prodigy who was touched by Shiwoon's conviction.
- Mungi Ma (마문기; Ma Mungi) is the leader of the Torrent Clan which has allied itself with the Martial Arts Alliance. His clan was in charge of keeping Sosul captive. When he is about to be killed by Chunwoo, Shiwoon saved his life causing Mungi to swear loyalty to Shiwoon. He is known as the Northern Black Star due to his skills.
- Jaemyung Cho is the head of the Iron Fist School, a school that specializes in physical strength and defense. He is killed by Chunwoo during the events of The Breaker.
- Wonjae Hyun is the head of the One Moon School, a school which excels in medicine. He has a one sided love for Shiho and attempts to bring her back from the dead in New Waves.
- Yaewon is the head of the Artist's Society School. She sympathizes with Chunwoo's hatred towards the Martial Arts Alliance. In New Waves, she teaches Shiwoon how to simulate battles within his mind in order to train.

Soldiers Under Command (SUC)

- Changho (창호; Changho) is Shiwoon's bully who is extremely violent. When Changho tried to rape Sehee, Shiwoon scares him off. Feeling intimidated, Chang-Ho brings a weapon to school and attempts to kill him. He is expelled from school afterwards. In New Waves, he receives training from SUC and fails to kill Shiwoon again.
- Jungchan Hyuk (혁정천; Hyeok Jeong Cheon) is the commander of SUC. His right-hand man is Jegal (제갈). The five captains are: Yonghyun Yan (양용현; Yang Yonghyeon), code named "Cool Guy". He prioritizes his pride over SUC's goals; Jiwoo Yi (이지유; I Jiyu) code named "Dark Princess". She dresses in a Gothic Lolita and is a cruel fighter. For unknown reason, she panics if the scar under her make up is exposed; Haru, code named "Thousand Faces". She excels in disguise and is able to adjust her skin and bones; Kwonyoung, code named "Blood Stream". He is known in the Murim as Western White Star; Ryuji, code named "Solitude". He knows how to use the Black Heaven and Earth Techniques as he was the disciple before Chunwoo.

Other characters

- Sehee (세희; Sehui) is Shiwoon's childhood friend. She is unaware of Shiwoon and the Murim world and lives as a normal high school girl.
- Shiho Lee (이시호; I Siho) is an assassin who uses her charms for her missions. She is from the Heavenly Maiden Skill school and excels at medicine. She is killed during the events of The Breaker and put into stasis by Wonjae in New Waves.
- Sera Kang (강세라; Gang Sera) is the head of the Mil-Yang Clan after her grandfather is killed by Chunwoo. She orchestrates an event involving Shiwoon in order to reinforce her position as the head of the Mil-Yang Clan. Afterwards, she becomes an ally to Shiwoon and helps him rebuild his Qi center. She has feelings for Shiwoon.
- Jigun Yoo (유지건; Yu Jigeon) is a prodigy from the Strong Dragon School, school which excels in sword techniques. He transfers to Shiwoon's school during Sera's plan to reinforce her position as the head and fights Shiwoon on her behest. Jigun aims to destroy SUC for unknown reasons.

== Release ==
The Breaker was serialized in Daiwon C.I.'s Young Champ's magazine between June 1, 2007, and July 20, 2010. The series' individual chapters were encapsulated in ten volumes released between August 31, 2007, and July 27, 2010. The sequel, The Breaker: New Waves, was serialized on Daum Communications' online comics portal from October 2010 to May 2015. The Breaker has been translated in other languages such as French, Italian, Russian, and Polish.

== The Breaker: Eternal Force (Released 2022) ==
The Breaker: Eternal Force is the third installment of The Breaker series and was released as a full-color webtoon on Naver Webtoon in May 2022 (Source: ). This installment shifts from the original black-and-white manhwa format to a vertical-scroll, mobile-optimized webtoon layout, designed for modern digital reading (Source: ).

The story introduces a new protagonist, Kang Haje, a troubled and isolated high school student who faces severe bullying and personal hardships. His life changes dramatically after he encounters Lee Si-un, a mysterious martial artist who is believed to be associated with the Murim world. Si-un becomes an unexpected mentor figure to Haje, pulling him into the hidden martial arts society that operates outside ordinary society. Their relationship mirrors the core dynamic of earlier installments, where a young protagonist becomes entangled with powerful martial arts factions, but Eternal Force adds a darker psychological tone by exploring Haje’s struggles and motivations (Source: ).

Story continues the overarching Murim conflict central to the previous series but expands on the political landscape by introducing new clans, shifting alliances, and an evolving hierarchy within the martial arts community. Long-time readers also note the return of several major characters from earlier parts, including figures connected to the Sunwoo Clan and former teacher Han Chun-woo (Goomoonryong), though their roles evolve due to the time gap between installments. The series explores themes of loyalty, revenge, leadership, and the consequences of power, consistent with the tone of earlier arcs.

Visually, the webtoon format allows for more dramatic use of color, energy effects, and atmospheric lighting. Fight sequences are reimagined with smoother flow due to the vertical layout, making them more accessible to new digital audiences. This modernization reflects the broader trend of Korean manhwa shifting from print to digital-first platforms.

The English version is available through LINE Webtoon, where the series received strong engagement from global readers following its launch Source:.

== Reception ==
Manga News described the plot of the beginning chapters of The Breaker as conventional but intriguing. In further volumes, Manga News praised the action and the increased pacing of the story. Animeland agreed and praised the series for its extraordinary action scenes.
