= Breaking (trading cards) =

Method of unboxing collectable cards

In trading and collectable cards, breaking is the practice of recording or livestreaming the opening or unboxing (breaking) of sealed collectible products. The product opened is often distributed to individuals who have purchased a right to receive part of the product from the individual prior to its breaking. This purchased part of the whole product is known as a "spot" and is similar to a blind bet. The practice of breaking is not officially considered gambling by many authorities, but has been noted to have the potential to create or promote a gambling addiction and inherently includes aspects common to other practices that are regulated as gambling.

Breaking originated in the mid-2000s from recorded shows done by New Jersey card dealer Rick Dalesandro, who went by the name Dr. Wax Battle, in which a box of sealed trading cards was opened on camera as a small part of the recorded event. The practice grew in popularity during the COVID-19 pandemic in 2020 and 2021, when many hobby shops were closed to the public. Breaking allowed for hobby shop owners to continue generating revenue, as viewers of a livestream could purchase the opened products without having to travel to the store to buy sealed booster packs. The growth of betting on breaking and the practice in general during this period was also attributed to a lack of live professional sports at the time.
