= Winter break =

Winter break refers to a Winter vacation, a school holiday that occurs during the winter. It may also refer to:

- Winter Break (2003 film), also released as Snow Job, an American comedy-drama with Milo Ventimiglia and Eddie Kaye Thomas
- "Winter Break" (Duty Free), a 1986 television episode
- "Winterbreak", a 2016 single by American electronic pop band Muna
- Winter Break: Hunter Mountain (2018), an American reality television series for MTV
