= The Breaker (film) =

- Directed by: Frank Shields
- Written by: Frank Shields
- Produced by: Frank Shields
- Release date: 1974
- Running time: 55 minute
- Country: Australia
- Language: English
- Budget: $7,000

The Breaker is a 1974 documentary about Breaker Morant directed by Frank Shields.

== Production ==
It was the first film from Frank Shields. He says he was inspired to make it after visiting Breaker Morant's grave. He was unable to get finance from the funding bodies so made it himself for $7,000. He researched it in Australia, wrote and shot it in Zimbabwe, and did the post production in London.

Shields later recalled:

I paid for the horses and cameramen with cases of beer. I didn’t know how to work a camera; they taught me how to make a film so it was like my film school... What holds the doco together is the story. It’s like a Greek tragedy – Morant was like the Ned Kelly and the Fletcher Christian; at one point he crossed a line that he could never come back from. At the end of the day it all comes down to story.

== Reception ==
The film won the Greater Union Awards for best documentary at the 1975 Sydney Film Festival. It aired on the ABC in 1975.

Shields wrote a book based on the documentary, In Search of Breaker Morant: Balladist and Bushveldt Carbineer, which was published in 1979.
