= Breaker (Black) =

Sculpture in Columbus, Ohio, U.S.

- The sculpture in 2018
- Artist: David Evans Black
- Year: 1982
- Medium: Aluminum sculpture
- Dimensions: 7.6 m × 20 m (25 ft × 65 ft)
- Location: Columbus, Ohio, United States; 40°00′07″N 83°00′37″W

Breaker is an outdoor sculpture by David Evans Black, installed on the Ohio State University campus in Columbus, Ohio, United States.

== Description and history ==
The abstract aluminum plate sculpture, which measures approximately 25 feet (7.6 m) × 65 feet (20 m), was commissioned in December 1980 and dedicated on July 9, 1982. It cost $30,000–35,000, and Allied Fabricating and Welding Company served as the fabricator. The sculpture was originally installed near Mershon Auditorium, but was relocated on June 5, 1985, to the southeast corner of College Rd. and W. 18th Ave. because of construction of the Wexner Center for the Arts. The Smithsonian Institution describes the work as "a white twisting metal sculpture symbolizing the ocean's waves breaking on the shore". It was surveyed by Smithsonian's "Save Outdoor Sculpture!" program in 1993.

== See also ==
- 1982 in art
