= Ryan Peak (Antarctica) =

Mountain in Antarctica

Ryan Peak (67°52′S 67°12′W) is a peak 1 nautical mile (1.9 km) east of Penitent Peak on Horseshoe Island. Surveyed by Falkland Islands Dependencies Survey (FIDS) in 1955–57. Named for Francis B. Ryan of FIDS, meteorologist at Horseshoe Island in 1956, who broke a leg in a climbing accident on this peak.
