= The Breakers (American band) =

American garage rock band

- Origin: Memphis, Tennessee, United States
- Genres: Garage rock; blues
- Years active: 1965–1967
- Label: Amy
- Past members: Mike Ladd; Gary Johns; Tom Keckler; Stew Lewis; Dick Lewis; Cully Powell; Eddie Tatum

The Breakers were an American garage rock band from Memphis, Tennessee who were active in the 1960s. They became one of the most popular bands in the Memphis area and enjoyed considerable success with their regional hit "Don't Bring Me No Flowers (I Ain't Dead Yet)". There has been a resurgence of interest in the Breakers amongst garage rock collectors and enthusiasts in recent years.

== History ==
The Breakers were founded in early 1965 in Memphis, Tennessee. The band was led by guitarist Mike Ladd. Ladd, a fan of blues, had played as a young street musician on Beale Street, where he was eventually spotted and invited to back B.B. King at club gigs there with the blues legend. According to Ladd:

I was playing blues on Beale St. when I was fifteen years old I was invited to play with B.B. King down there when it was too cool for a white boy to be down there playing.

He tried to keep these activities secret from his parents, but eventually his father found out and sent him to military school. There, he met Duane Allman, who would later gain fame with the Allman Brothers. He eventually hooked up with several students from Whitehaven High School to start the Breakers. The group's lineup consisted of Ladd on guitar, Gary Johns and Stew Lewis on vocals, Tom Keckler on bass, Dick Lewis on guitars, Cully Powell on keyboards, and Eddie Tatum on drums.

Seymour Rosenberg became the group's manager and arranged for them to sign with Amy Records. The group went to Nashville to sign the contract. The Breakers chose two songs for the upcoming single written by a neighborhood friend, Donna Weiss: "Don't Send Me No Flowers (I Ain't Dead Yet)" and "Love of My Life". Weiss would later co-write the 1980s Kim Karnes hit "Bette Davis Eyes". "Don't Send Me No Flowers" was chosen as the A-side. The group went to Bill Justis' recording studio in Nashville to record the tracks which were released in August 1965. "Don't Send Me No Flowers" became a huge local and regional hit, reaching #1 on many of the local charts, was subsequently covered by several acts, such as the Gentrys. According to Ladd "We knocked the Beatles off the top of both WHBQ and WMPS' charts".

The group opened for the Yardbirds when they played in Memphis in the fall of 1966 on their final US tour. The show took place on a rainy night. According to Ladd, "We played Skateland in Frayser first, then had to pack up in the rain and drive across Clearpool." The Breakers lent the Yardbirds some of their equipment for their performance, but in an effort to play with extra volume and distortion, the Yardbirds accidentally blew up two of the Breakers' amps. The Breakers' encounter with the Yardbirds was tense, finding several of the members of the English group to be unpleasant, but Ladd later became good friends with Jeff Beck. Several of the Breakers' members, including Ladd, were drafted in 1967, thus effectively ending the group

After Ladd returned from the service, he eventually started a music store, Guitar and Drum City, which lasted for a number of years. He has more recently built custom guitars for various musicians around the world. Dick Lewis fronted another local band the Poneees for a brief period and later became a teacher at Sherwood Jr. High. Gary Johns joined popular Memphis group, Caboose, and has sung in jazz combos around the area. Tom Keckler owned a guitar shop in Mid-town Memphis for years. In the intervening years the Breakers' work has come to the attention of garage rock collectors and enthusiasts. Their version of "Don't Bring Me No Flowers" appears on the Pebbles, Volume 10 CD released in 1996 on Greg Shaw's AIP label.

== Membership ==
- Mike Ladd (guitar)
- Gary Johns (vocals)
- Tom Keckler (bass)
- Stew Lewis (vocals and guitar)
- Dick Lewis (guitar)
- Cully Powell (organ)
- Eddie Tatum (drums)

== Discography ==
- "Don't Send Me No Flowers (I Ain't Dead Yet)" b/w "Love of My Life" (Amy 938, August 1965)

== Bibliography ==
- Hall, Ron (2001). Playing for a Piece of the Door: A History of Garage & Frat Bands in Memphis 1960-1975 (1st ed.). Memphis: Sharngri-La Projects. ISBN 0-9668575-1-8.
- Markesich, Mike (2012). Teenbeat Mayhem (1st ed.). Branford, Connecticut: Priceless Info Press. p. 69. ISBN 978-0-985-64825-1.
