= Breaking (album) =

Studio album by Brian Larsen
- Released: August 4, 2009
- Recorded: 2007–2009
- Genre: Rock
- Length: 48:57
- Label: Protocol Records
- Producer: Brian Larsen

Brian Larsen chronology
In the Meantime (2007)	Breaking (2009)	Building (2011)

Breaking is the eighth full-length album by American musician Brian Larsen, first released in August 2009 (see 2009 in music) and the first released under Larsen's own name. The album was produced, written, and performed in its entirety by Larsen.

== Track listing ==
1. "Stay or Break" – 3:59
2. "Gotta Get You" – 3:26
3. "Frozen" – 3:13
4. "Running Out of Breath" – 3:26
5. "Breaking" – 4:23
6. "Hold Me Down" – 4:41
7. "Hang On" – 3:51
8. "Watching The World Go By" – 4:10
9. "Stand My Ground" – 3:24
10. "Open Heart" – 3:39
11. "Watching You Fall" – 3:32
12. "Will You Remember Me?" – 3:07
13. "In The Winter" – 4:09

== Personnel ==
- Brian Larsen – lead vocals, rhythm guitar, drums, backing vocals, synthesizer, electric piano, bass guitar
- Clay Vernon – mixing
