= Mount Breaker =

Mountain in Graham Land, Antarctica

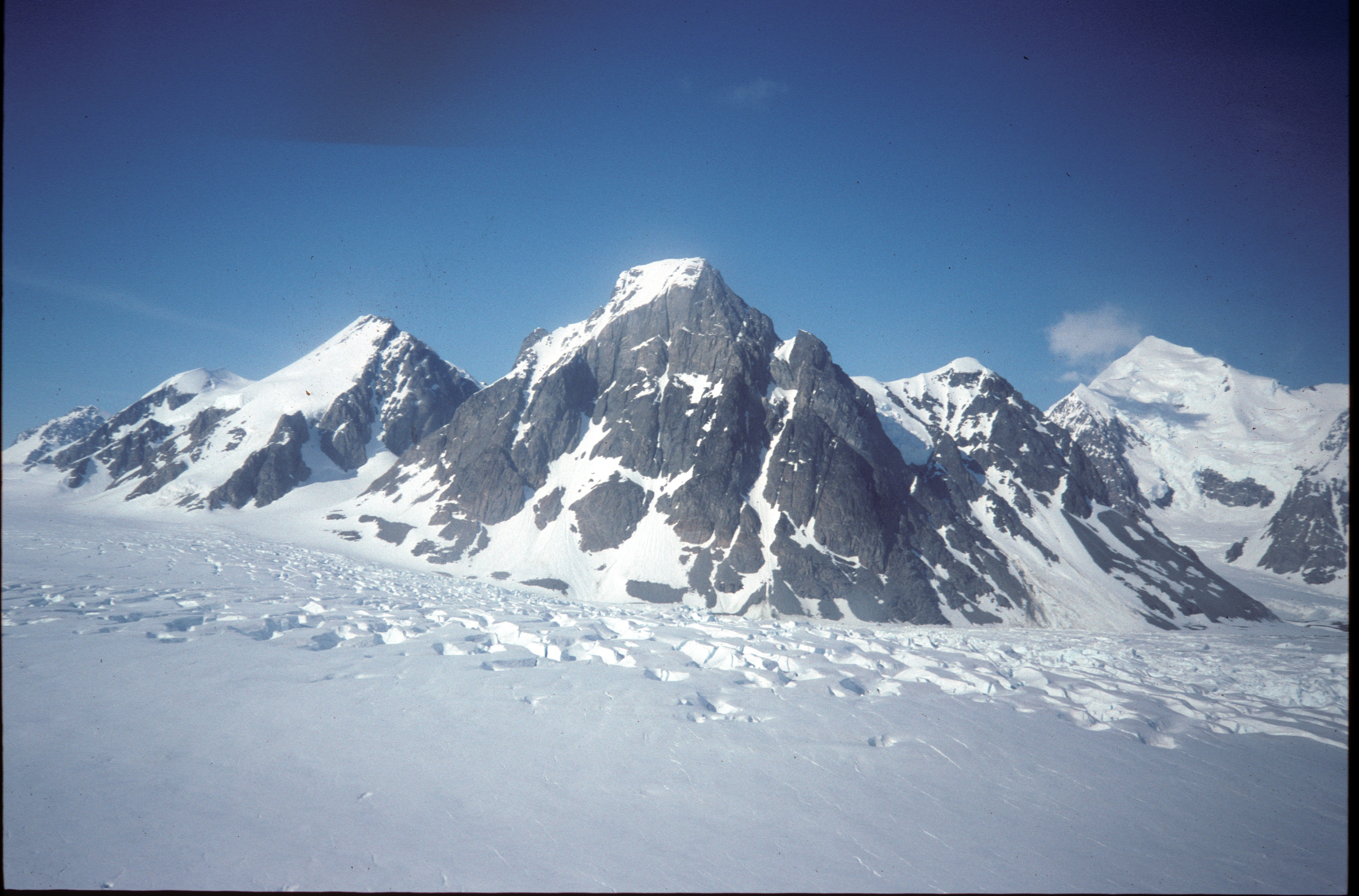
Mount Breaker

Mount Breaker (67°53′S 67°16′W) is a mountain with double summits, the eastern summit being, at 880 metres (2,890 ft), the highest on Horseshoe Island, off Graham Land. The name was given by the United Kingdom Antarctic Place-Names Committee in 1958 and is descriptive; the two summits are separated by a shallow col and, when seen from the west, resemble a breaking wave.
