= FLAVORx =

FLAVORx, Inc.
- Type: Private company
- Industry: Pharmacy
- Founded: 1995
- Founder: Kenny Kramm
- Headquarters: Columbia, Maryland, United States
- Key people: Stuart R. Amos (President and CEO)
- Website: flavorx.com

FLAVORx is a private company based in Columbia, Maryland, United States that supplies sugar-free, hypoallergenic, and inert medicine flavorings and flavoring systems to pharmacies. The company was established in 1995 in Washington, D.C. It offers 18 pediatric flavors and 17 veterinary flavors, which can be added to prescription or over-the-counter liquid medications.

Flavorx can be found in more than 46,000 pharmacies, and has flavored over 100 million prescriptions.

FlavorX uses a 6-stage water filtration system, along with annual visits, to ensure USP compliance in chain and independent pharmacies. Flavorx has several flavoring machines. The PRO displays the formulary (flavoring recipe) but requires manual measurement of flavor. They also have AUTO, which reconstitutes and flavors automatically. Flavorx can be found in most major chains and independent pharmacies.

The flavorings are intended to improve the palatability of their host medications by suppressing bitterness, adding sweetness, and/or enhancing the flavor profile. The flavoring of liquid medicines using these products has been shown to improve pediatric drug compliance. The firm also sells Pill Glide, a flavored spray designed to lubricate the mouth and throat, making pills easier to swallow.
