= Kenny Kramm =

American entrepreneur (1961–2016)

- Born: Kenneth Lee Kramm; June 16, 1961; Washington, D.C., U.S.
- Died: July 12, 2016 (aged 55); Washington, D.C., U.S.
- Education: University of Maryland (1984)
- Occupation: Entrepreneur
- Known for: Flavoring medicines
- Spouse: Shelley Neiss (m. 1985–2016)
- Children: 2

Kenneth Lee Kramm (June 16, 1961 – July 12, 2016) was an American entrepreneur who founded FLAVORx and its system of adding flavoring to otherwise unpalatable medicines to make them easier to take.

Kramm was born in Washington, D.C. and grew up in Potomac, Maryland. He graduated from the University of Maryland in 1984 with a degree in advertising design and became an art director for an agency. After developing a dislike for that career in 1992, he joined his father's pharmacy firm in Washington as a business manager.

== Flavored medicine ==
Kramm's youngest daughter began suffering epileptic seizures weeks after her birth in February 1992. Once she was able to be released from the hospital, she balked at the multiple daily doses of phenobarbital needed to prevent grand mal seizures, by either refusing to take the ill-tasting medicine or holding it in her mouth until it leaked out. Her seizures continued, resulting in more hospital trips. Within a few months, Kramm and his wife Shelley decided something must be done.

In May 1992, Kramm's father, Harold, suggested sweetening the medicine with flavorings used by candy manufacturers. The men spent their evenings, after store hours, tasting different samples. Kramm then took home the flavored medicine that he hoped his daughter would approve. She ultimately picked one and resumed her proper dosage. Parents from the nearby children's hospital heard about the flavoring, and FLAVORx went into business.

== Death ==
Kramm died from sepsis in 2016, after contracting an infection.
