= Breakout Star =

A breakout star is a person that has a breakthrough into widespread consciousness.

Breakout Star may also refer to:

- "Breakout Star" (Amphibia), an episode of Amphibia
- "Breakout Star", several different awards given out at the Teen Choice Awards
- "Breakout Star", any of several pro-wrestling awards
  - "Breakout Star", an award given out at the AEW Awards
- "Breakout Star", an award given out at the 2013 Radio Disney Music Awards

== See also ==
- Best Breakout Star, former name of the MTV Movie Award for Best Breakthrough Performance
- Breakout Star of the Year, an award given out at the NXT Year-End Award
- Breakout (disambiguation)
- Star (disambiguation)
