= CSPR =

CSPR may refer to:

- Closely-Spaced Parallel Runways, a runway categorization for simultaneous approaches in aviation
- Committee on Scientific Planning and Review, a committee for International Council for Science
