= Big break =

Big break is a term regarding a person's professional profile becoming prominent enough for others to take notice. The term may also refer to:

- Big Break, a British snooker television game show
- Big Break (American TV series), American talent competition TV show
- "Big Break" (Drifters), a 2016 television episode
- My Big Break, a 2009 documentary film
- The Big Break, a competitive golf reality television series
- "The Big Break" (Gimme Gimme Gimme), a 1999 television episode
- Your Big Break, an American singing TV talent show
- Big Break Regional Shoreline, Contra Costa County, California, USA
- Justin Payne, nicknamed Big Break, Toronto vigilante; see Creep Catchers

== See also ==
- Breakthrough role, a similar and related term in the entertainment industry
- Break (disambiguation)
- Breakout (disambiguation)
- Big (disambiguation)
- BidaMan: The Big Break, Philippine TV show
- Big School-Break, Soviet TV miniseries
