= Visual flight rules =

Regulations for flying an aircraft in clear weather conditions

In aviation, visual flight rules (VFR) is a set of regulations under which a pilot operates an aircraft in weather conditions generally clear enough to allow the pilot to see where the aircraft is going. Specifically, the weather must be better than basic VFR weather minima, i.e., in visual meteorological conditions (VMC), as specified in the rules of the relevant aviation authority. The pilot must be able to operate the aircraft with visual reference to the ground, and by visually avoiding obstructions and other aircraft.

If the weather is less than VMC, pilots are required to use instrument flight rules, and operation of the aircraft will be primarily through referencing the instruments rather than visual reference. In a control zone, a VFR flight may obtain a clearance from air traffic control to operate as Special VFR.

== Requirements ==
VFR requires a pilot to be able to see outside the cockpit to control the aircraft's altitude, navigate, and avoid obstacles and other aircraft. Governing agencies establish specific requirements for VFR flight, including minimum visibility, and distance from clouds, to ensure that aircraft operating under VFR are visible from enough distance to ensure safety.

Under visual meteorological conditions, the minimum visual range, distance from clouds, or cloud clearance requirements to be maintained above ground vary by jurisdiction, and may also vary according to the airspace in which the aircraft is operating.

In some countries, VFR flight is permitted at night, and is known as night VFR. This is generally permitted only under more restrictive conditions, such as maintaining minimum safe altitudes, and may require additional training as a pilot at night may not be able to see and avoid obstacles.

The VFR pilot is required to "see and avoid" obstacles and other aircraft. Pilots flying under VFR assume responsibility for their separation from all other aircraft and are generally not assigned routes or altitudes by air traffic control (ATC). Depending on the category of airspace in which the flight is being conducted, VFR aircraft may be required to have a transponder to help Air Traffic Control identify the aircraft on radar in order that ATC can provide separation from IFR aircraft.

Meteorological conditions that meet the minimum requirements for VFR flight are termed visual meteorological conditions (VMC). If they are not met, the conditions are considered instrument meteorological conditions (IMC), and a flight may only operate under IFR. IFR operations have specific training requirements and certification required of the pilot, and increased equipment requirements for the aircraft. Additionally, an IFR flight plan must usually be filed in advance.

For efficiency of operations, some ATC operations will routinely provide "pop-up" IFR clearances for aircraft operating VFR, but that are arriving at an airport that does not meet VMC requirements. For example, in the United States, California's Oakland (KOAK), Monterey (KMRY) and Santa Ana (KSNA) airports routinely grant temporary IFR clearance when a low coastal overcast forces instrument approaches, while the rest of the state is still under visual flight rules.

For pilots without an instrument rating who cannot legally fly by instrument flight rules, the restrictions of VMC minima can be troublesome in locations where weather conditions can change suddenly and unexpectedly or when weather events are highly localized. For instance, a small cloud forming over the airport at less than 1000 feet technically requires the airport to allow only IFR flights using instrument approaches/departures. A VFR flight intending to land there would normally be denied clearance, and would either have to divert to another field with VMC, or declare an emergency and override the denial of clearance, which can prompt an inquiry and possibly result in adverse consequences for the pilot.

To avoid these scenarios, VFR flights intending to land at or take off from an airport experiencing localized conditions marginally below VMC minima may request Special VFR clearance from the tower. SVFR flight is only allowed while within the portion of an airport's controlled airspace (class B, C, or D) that extends to the surface, and it must be explicitly requested by the pilot and granted by the tower (some airports, primarily large Class B facilities, do not allow SVFR operation in their airspace at all). Visibility on the ground must still be greater than one statute mile, but most other VMC minima such as ceiling are waived. The pilot is required to maintain VFR separation distances from other aircraft and, by requesting SVFR, asserts that they can do so despite the marginal conditions. For departing flights, the pilot must be flying in VMC by the time they leave the surface footprint of the controlled airspace (otherwise they would be flying VFR in IMC which is illegal).

VFR flight is not allowed in airspace known as class A, regardless of the meteorological conditions except after failure of two way radio communications or during declared emergencies such as VFR traffic attempting to avoid severe weather formations. In the United States, class A airspace is measured using flight levels, and begins at FL180 up to FL600, which is about 18,000 to 60,000 feet as measured using an altimeter at standard pressure (29.92 inHg, 1013 mbar). An exception to IFR-only flying in this airspace is the occasional allowance of sailplanes within designated wave windows which may be opened by air traffic control when high altitude flights are to be conducted into mountain lee waves.

== Traffic advisories ==
In the United States, Canada, and Australia, a pilot operating under VFR outside Class B, C, D airspace can request "flight following" from ATC, to receive continuous verbal updates on air traffic. This service is provided by ATC if workload permits, but it is an advisory service only. The responsibility for maintaining separation with other aircraft and proper navigation still remains with the pilot in command (PIC). In the United Kingdom, this is known as a "Traffic Service". In other countries, it is known as "Flight Information Service".

== Pilot certifications ==
In the United States and Canada, any certified pilot who meets specific recency of experience criteria may operate an airworthy aircraft under VFR.

== VFR cruising altitude rules in the US and Canada ==
In the US, there are specific VFR cruising altitudes, based on the aircraft's course, to assist pilots in separating their aircraft while operating under visual flight above 3,000 ft above the surface (AGL) but below 18,000 ft Mean Sea Level (MSL). Unofficially, most pilots use these rules at all levels of cruise flight. FAR 91.159 states that any aircraft:

- On a magnetic course of 0-179 degrees shall fly at an odd thousand ft MSL altitude +500 feet (e.g., 3,500, 5,500, or 7,500 ft); or
- On a magnetic course of 180-359 degrees shall fly at an even thousand ft MSL altitude +500 feet (e.g., 4,500, 6,500, or 8,500 ft).

== Low flying rules in the US ==
In the US, FAR Part 91 (specifically 91.119) of the Federal Aviation Regulations controls the minimum safe altitudes by which aircraft can be operated in the National Airspace System.

"Notwithstanding" rule
Though specific altitudes are called as noted below - there is an overreaching general requirement to maintain sufficient altitude that if a power unit fails, an emergency landing without undue hazard to persons or property on the surface can be made. This may be significantly higher than 500 feet or 1,000 feet.

500 ft rule
An aircraft must maintain an altitude of 500 feet above the surface, except over open water or sparsely populated areas. In those cases, the aircraft may not be operated closer than 500 feet to any person, vessel, vehicle, or structure.

1000 ft rule
An aircraft must maintain an altitude of 1,000 feet above the highest obstacle within a horizontal radius of 2,000 feet of the aircraft over any congested area of a city, town, or settlement, or over any open air assembly of persons.

Other aircraft, such as helicopters, powered parachutes, and weight-shift-control aircraft, are not required to meet the FAR 91 minimums, so long as their operation is conducted without hazard to persons or property on the surface.

== Low flying rules in the EU ==
In all EU member states, the Standardised European Rules of the Air apply: these set out a minimum altitude of 150 m (500 ft) above any obstacle within a radius of 150 m (500 ft), except with permission, or when taking off or landing. If an aircraft is flying over a congested area (town, settlement, etc.) it must fly high enough so that in the case of an engine failure, it is able to land clear safely AND it must not fly less than 300 m (1000 ft) above the highest fixed object within 600 m of the aircraft.

Member states are allowed to modify the low flying rule to suit their jurisdiction, for instance in the UK, the "500 ft Rule" allows pilots to fly below 500 ft as long as they are no closer than 500 ft to any person, vessel, vehicle, building or structure. The rules for flying near congested areas are the same in the UK as the rest of the EU.

== Controlled visual flight rules ==
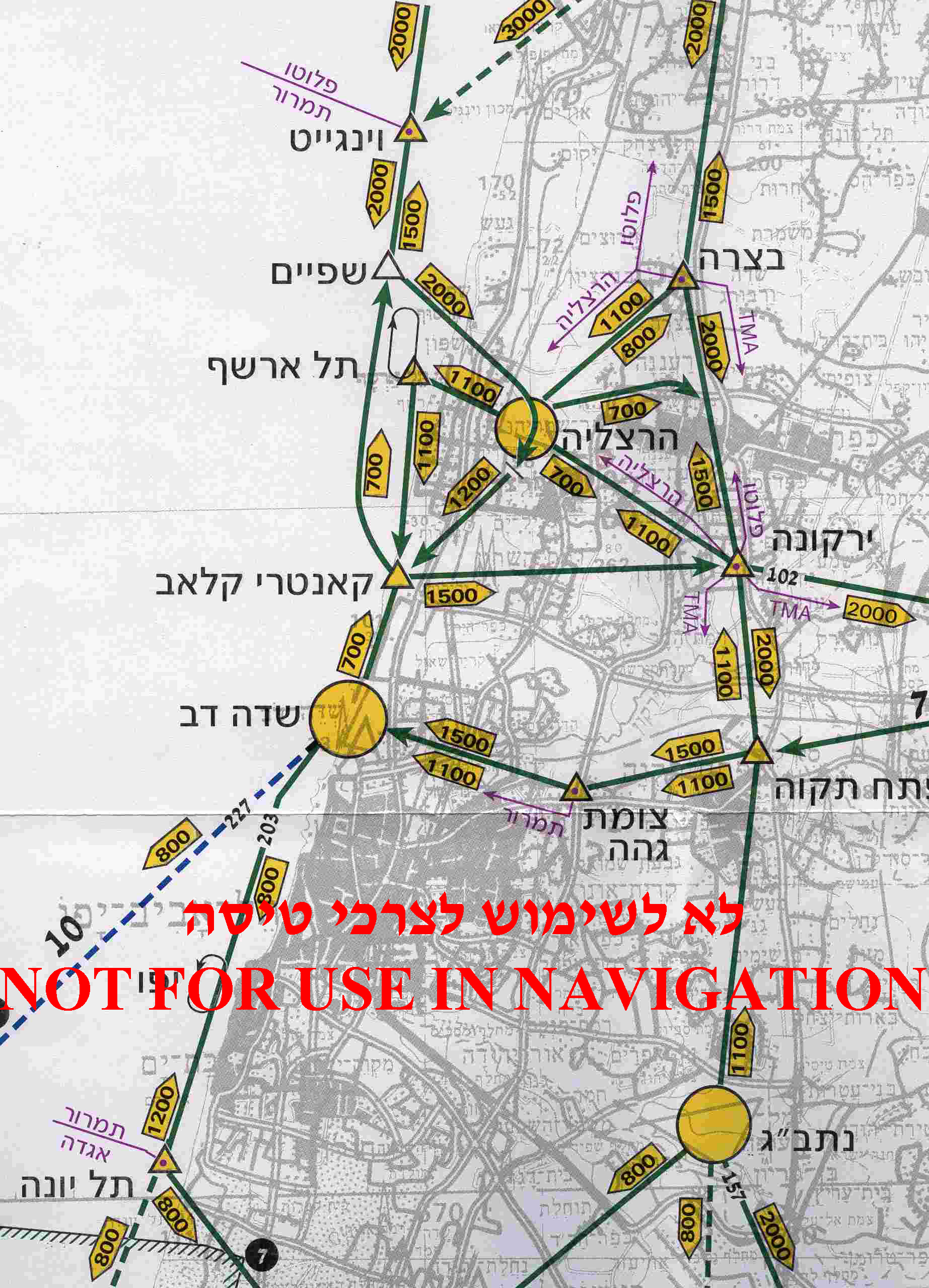
Section of CVFR flight routes map of Tel Aviv (Israel) area. Flight altitude in each direction is notated in yellow arrow-box. Compulsory reporting points are marked with triangles and airports are marked by yellow circles.

CVFR flight is used in locations where aviation authorities have determined that VFR flight should be allowed, but that ATC separation and minimal guidance are necessary. In this respect, CVFR is similar to instrument flight rules (IFR) in that ATC will give pilots headings and altitudes at which to fly, and will provide separation and conflict resolution. However, pilots and aircraft do not need to be IFR rated to fly in CVFR areas, which is highly advantageous. An example of airspace where CVFR is common would be Canadian Class B airspace.

The CVFR concept is used in Canada and certain European countries, but not in the U.S., where the Private Pilot certificate itself authorizes the pilot to accept clearances under VFR.

In Israel, for example, VFR does not exist. All visual flights must be performed under CVFR rules.

== See also ==
- Automatic Dependent Surveillance–Broadcast
- Bárány chair
- Simultaneous opposite direction parallel runway operations
