= CRDA =

CRDA may refer to:

== Organisations ==
- Andhra Pradesh Capital Region Development Authority (APCRDA), an urban planning agency in India
- Calgary Roller Derby Association, a Canadian roller-derby league
- Casino Reinvestment Development Authority, a New Jersey, US state governmental agency
- Croda International (LSE stock symbol), a British chemicals company

=== Aviation ===
- Cantieri Riuniti dell'Adriatico, an Italian manufacturer in the sea and air industry from 1930 to 1966
  - "C.R.D.A.", designations attached to aircraft manufactured by a related company, Cantieri Aeronautici e Navali Triestini

== Other uses ==
- Cooperative Research and Development Agreement, an agreement between a US government agency and a private company
- Central Regulatory Domain Agent, controls wireless channels in computer networking
- Converging Runway Display Aid, an aviation computer software used during dependent converging instrument approach operations
