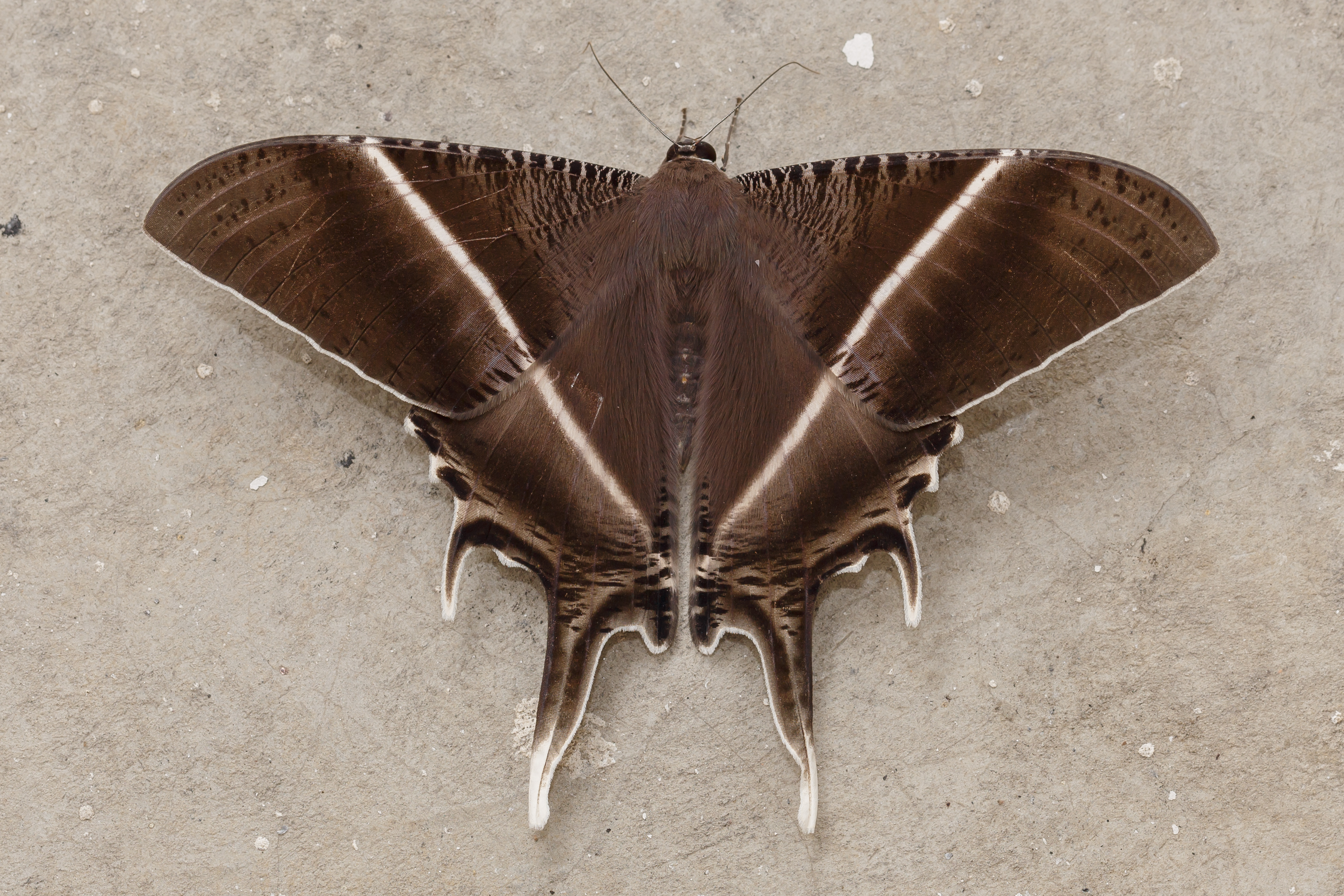
- Lyssa zampa. Kuala Lumpur, Malaysia

Scientific classification
- Kingdom: Animalia
- Phylum: Arthropoda
- Clade: Pancrustacea
- Class: Insecta
- Order: Lepidoptera
- Family: Uraniidae
- Genus: Lyssa
- Species: L. zampa

Binomial name
- Lyssa zampa Butler, 1869

Synonyms
- Nyctalemon zampa Butler, 1869; Nyctalemon crameri Boisduval, 1874; Nyctalemon najabula Moore, 1877; Nyctalemon docile Butler, 1877; Nyctalemon dilutus Röber, 1927

= Lyssa zampa =

Species of moth

Lyssa zampa, the tropical swallowtail moth or Laos brown butterfly, is a moth of the family Uraniidae. The species was first described by British entomologist Arthur Gardiner Butler in 1869.

The species is native to a wide range of tropical South-East Asia: Indonesia, Singapore, Malaysia, Thailand, and the Philippines. It is also recorded from Andaman Islands, southern China, the Himalayas, and sporadically in East Asia: Taiwan, Japan and South Korea. The forewing length is about 70 mm (2.8 in) and the wingspan reaches a maximum of 160 mm (6.3 in).

It is most abundant from May to November depending on the location. The genus Lyssa is generally categorized as a nocturnal or crepuscular group, but this species has been found to be active both during the day and at night. This species is also known for its mass emergence and migration. Because of that ecology and the habit that they are often attracted by urban bright lights, this species can attract human attention. Sightings in urban areas are attributed to dry spells in forests.

The larvae feed on Endospermum and other members of the rubber tree family (Euphorbiaceae).
