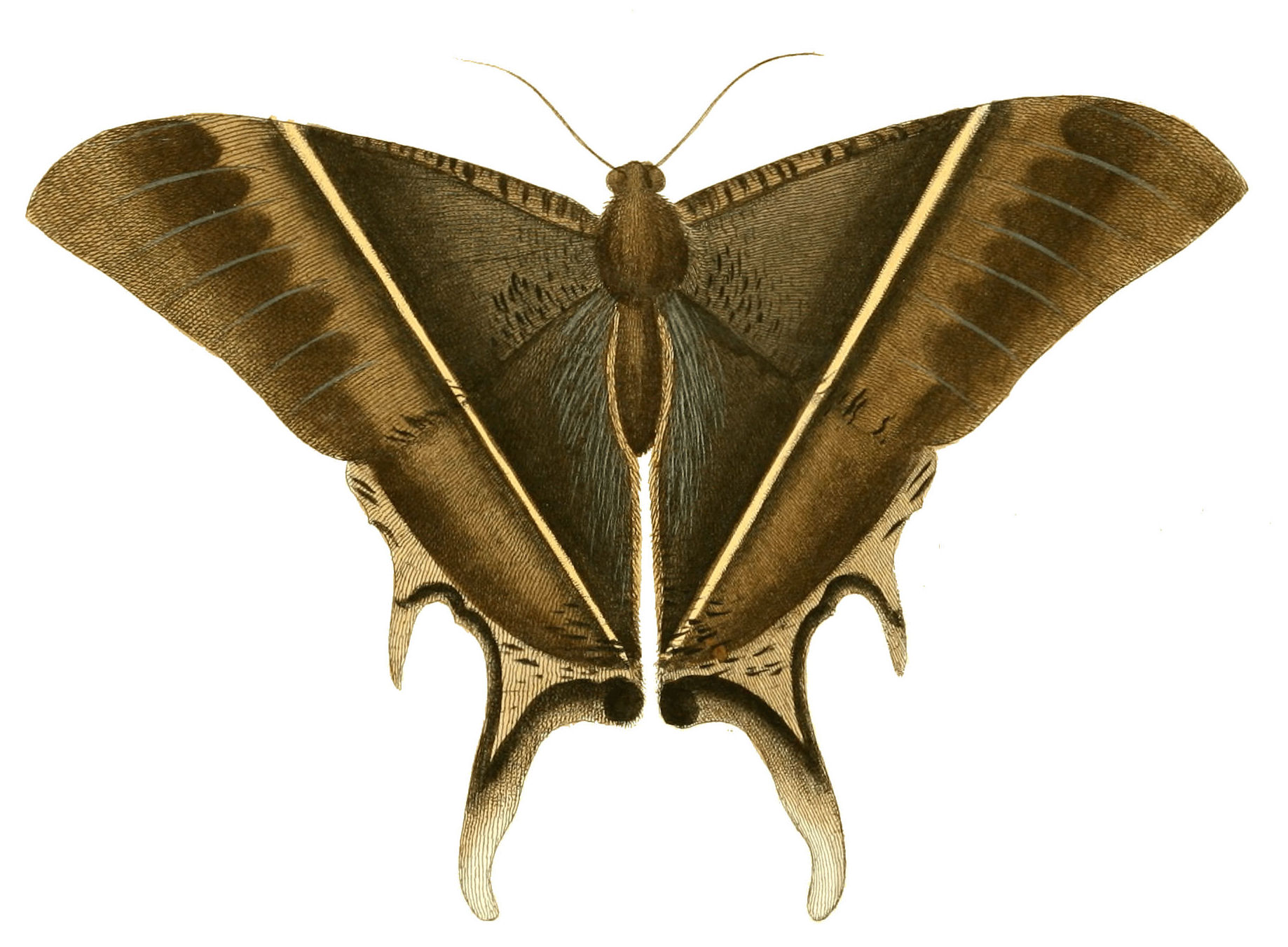
- Illustration by Dru Drury

Scientific classification
- Kingdom: Animalia
- Phylum: Arthropoda
- Clade: Pancrustacea
- Class: Insecta
- Order: Lepidoptera
- Family: Uraniidae
- Genus: Lyssa
- Species: L. patroclus

Binomial name
- Lyssa patroclus (Linnaeus, 1758)

Synonyms
- Papilio patroclus Linnaeus, 1758

= Lyssa patroclus =

Species of moth

Lyssa patroclus is a species of moth in the family Uraniidae. The species was described by Carl Linnaeus in his 1758 10th edition of Systema Naturae from the Moluccas.

== Description ==
Upperside: The antennae are about an inch (25 mm) long, slender, setaceous, and gradually diminishing from the base to the extremities. The head is small. The thorax is clothed with long soft hair, and, with the abdomen, is of a darkish brown. A remarkable straight narrow line, or bar, of a cream colour, arises from the middle of the anterior edge of each of the forewings, and, crossing both anterior and posterior wings, ends at the abdominal edges, about half an inch below the abdomen; so that, when the wings are extended, as in the figure, these lines, with the anterior edges, form an equilateral triangle. The space within the triangle is dark brown; but the parts, near the shoulders, are lighter, having a greyish cast or hue, and contain many small transverse curved streaks, extending to the anterior edges, where they are large, black, and very conspicuous, like stripes. Some transverse markings of this kind, are dispersed on the posterior edges of the superior wings, and also on the abdominal edges of the posterior. On the outside the triangle, both on the anterior and posterior wings, is a fascia, of light brown, about half an inch broad, which deepens into a dark brown. On the posterior wings, after becoming dark, it softens again into the same light colour, continuing to the external edges. Each of these wings is ornamented with two tails, the inner ones the longest and near an inch in length, the tips of which incline towards each other; the lesser or outer tails, are about half an inch long, strengthened by the tendons of the wings passing through the middle of them; all of them being bordered with a soft ray of dark brown.

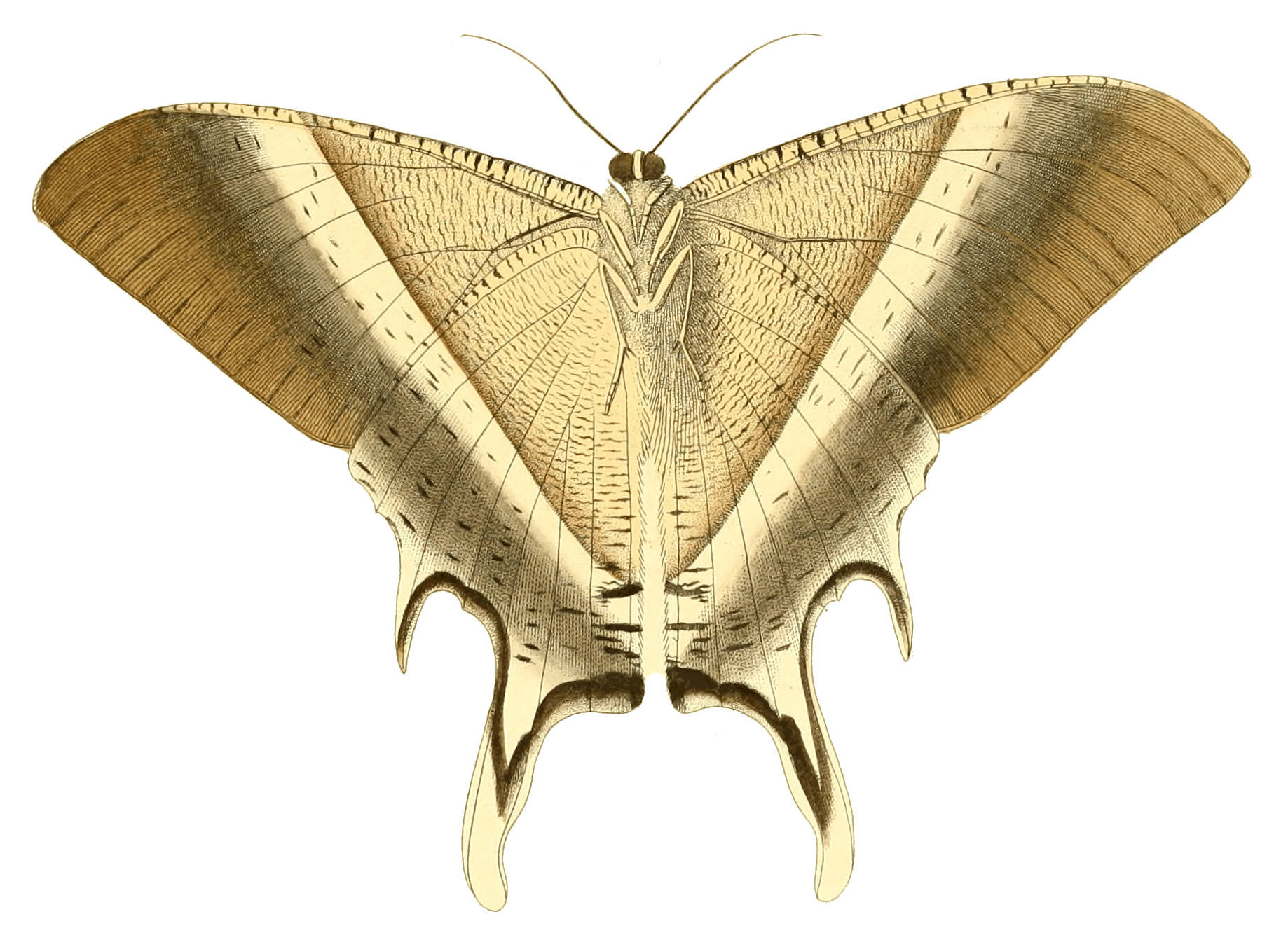
Ventral view

Underside: The bars or lines, which form the triangle on the upperside, are not visible on this; but the inclosed triangular field appears of a light greyish brown, darker at the borders, and thickly beset with small brown streaks, parallel to each other, and surrounding the body. The costal nerve of the anterior wings composes an edging in each, about one-eighth of an inch (3.2 mm) broad, which diminishes as it approaches the external angle, white, and beautifully marked with black streaks, but smaller than those seen on the upperside. Outside the triangle, both in the anterior and posterior wings, is a broad border of white, which softens into a brown, but lighter than that on the upperside. Both in the white, and in the brown, are some small dashes of black, very thinly dispersed. The internal margin of the posterior wings is furnished with a deep fringe, and the black marks situated below the abdomen, are larger and broader than those on the upperside. The tails are whitish, bordered with brown, and appear as on the upperside. Wingspan 6 inches (150 mm).
