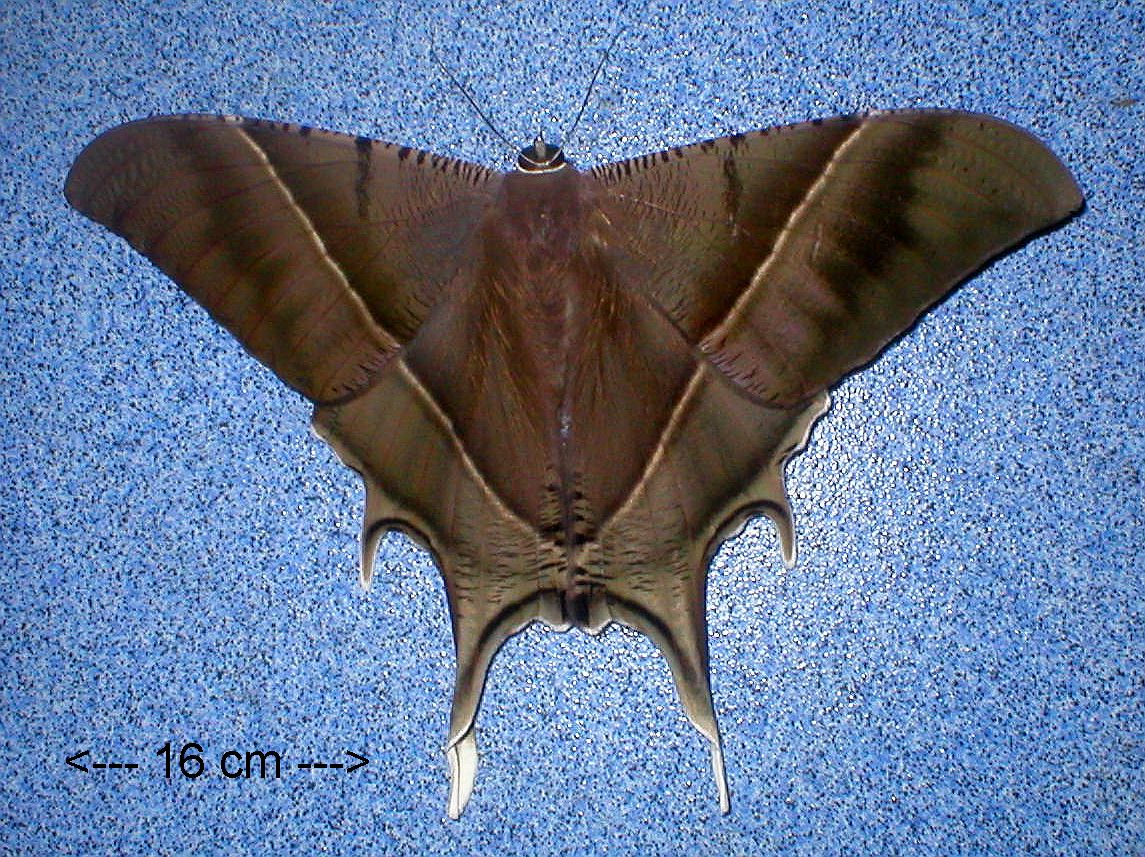
- Lyssa zampa from Laos

Scientific classification
- Kingdom: Animalia
- Phylum: Arthropoda
- Clade: Pancrustacea
- Class: Insecta
- Order: Lepidoptera
- Family: Uraniidae
- Subfamily: Uraniinae
- Genus: Lyssa; Hübner, 1823

Synonyms
- Nyctalemon Dalman, 1825; Lyssidia Westwood, 1879

= Lyssa (moth) =

Genus of moths

Lyssa is a genus of moths in the family Uraniidae. The genus was erected by Jacob Hübner in 1823.

== Distribution ==
The genus includes relatively large moths that are found in southern Asia and the Pacific region.

== Species ==
- Lyssa achillaria Hübner, 1816
- Lyssa aruus (Felder, 1874)
- Lyssa aurora (Salvin & Godman, 1877)
- Lyssa curvata Skinner, 1903 (Vanuatu)
- Lyssa fletcheri Regteren Altena, 1953
- Lyssa macleayi (Montrouzier, 1857) (Australia)
- Lyssa menoetius (Hopffer, 1856) (Borneo, Philippines, Sangir, Sulawesi)
- Lyssa mutata Butler, 1887 (Solomons)
- Lyssa patroclus (Linnaeus, 1758) (Moluccas)
- Lyssa patroclaria Hübner, 1816
- Lyssa toxopeusi Regteren Altena, 1953
- Lyssa velutinus Röber, 1927
- Lyssa zampa (Butler, 1869) (Himalayas to southern China, Thailand, Andamans, Philippines, Sulawesi)
