= List of airports with triple takeoff/landing capability =

Airport layout of Kuala Lumpur Airport, a typical airport with triple parallel landing capabilities

Triple takeoff/landing capability are a necessity for many large airports, as this allows many aircraft to arrive and depart in a short amount of time. Each country sets its own standards for the separation between runways required for simultaneous approaches. In the United States, the Federal Aviation Administration dictates that airports must have at least 3,000 feet (910 m) between runways, though it can grant special permission to conduct parallel approaches with less separation if deemed necessary.

== Airports with triple parallel landing capabilities ==
Airport	City	Country	Number of runways	IATA/ICAO code	Ref.	Notes
Amsterdam Airport Schiphol	Amsterdam	Netherlands	6	AMS/EHAM		
Beijing Capital International Airport	Beijing	China	3	PEK/ZBAA		
Beijing Daxing International Airport	Beijing/Langfang	China	4 (5)	PKX/ZBAD		After expansion, the airport will have 5 parallel runways capable of quadruple parallel landings.
Cairo International Airport	Cairo	Egypt	3	CAI/HECA		
Singapore Changi Airport	Changi, Singapore	Singapore	3	SIN/WSSS		
Charlotte Douglas International Airport	Charlotte	United States	4	CLT/KCLT		
Cincinnati/Northern Kentucky International Airport	Cincinnati	United States	4	CVG/KCVG		
Dallas Fort Worth International Airport	Dallas/Fort Worth	United States	7	DFW/KDFW		
Denver International Airport	Denver	United States	6	DEN/KDEN		
Detroit Metropolitan Airport	Detroit	United States	6	DTW/KDTW		
Dulles International Airport	Washington, D.C.	United States	4	IAD/KIAD		
George Bush Intercontinental Airport	Houston	United States	5	IAH/KIAH		
Guangzhou Baiyun International Airport	Guangzhou	China	5	CAN/ZGGG		
Hartsfield–Jackson Atlanta International Airport	Atlanta	United States	5	ATL/KATL		
Hong Kong International Airport	Hong Kong	China	3	HKG/VHHH		Due to terrain constraints, triple parallel approaches are currently not authorised, only double parallel approaches and a parallel takeoff are approved for the three runways.
Indira Gandhi International Airport	Delhi	India	4	DEL/VIDP		Although runway 27/09 is not magnetically aligned with the other runways, existing approaches permit triple parallel operations.
Istanbul Airport	Istanbul	Turkey	5	IST/LTFM		The first triple parallel takeoff was conducted on 17 April 2025.
King Abdulaziz International Airport	Jeddah	Saudi Arabia	3	JED/OEJN		
Kuala Lumpur International Airport	Kuala Lumpur	Malaysia	3	KUL/WMKK		
Kuwait International Airport	Kuwait City	Kuwait	3	KWI/OKKK		
Los Angeles LAX	Los Angeles	United States	4	LAX		
Memphis International Airport	Memphis	United States	4	MEM/KMEM		
Minneapolis−Saint Paul International Airport	Minneapolis	United States	4	MSP/KMSP		Though runway 17/35 is not magnetically aligned with the other parallel runways, existing approaches permit triple parallel operations.
Nashville International Airport	Nashville	United States	4	BNA/KBNA		
Chicago O'Hare International Airport	Chicago	United States	8	ORD/KORD		Currently capable of quadruple parallel landings.
Orlando International Airport	Orlando	United States	4	MCO/KMCO		
Philadelphia International Airport	Philadelphia	United States	4	PHL/KPHL		
Salt Lake City International Airport	Salt Lake City	United States	4	SLC/KSLC		Though runway 17/35 is not magnetically aligned with the other parallel runways, existing approaches permit triple parallel operations.
Shanghai Pudong International Airport	Shanghai	China	5	PVG/ZSPD		
Soekarno–Hatta International Airport	Jakarta	Indonesia	3	CGK/WIII		
St. Louis Lambert International Airport	St. Louis	United States	4	STL/KSTL		
Toronto Pearson International Airport	Toronto	Canada	5	YYZ/CYYZ		
Wichita Falls Regional Airport	Wichita Falls	United States	4	SPS/KSPS		Though runway 18/36 is not magnetically aligned with the other parallel runways, existing approaches permit triple parallel operations with small aircraft.
