= Precision runway monitor =

Radar system

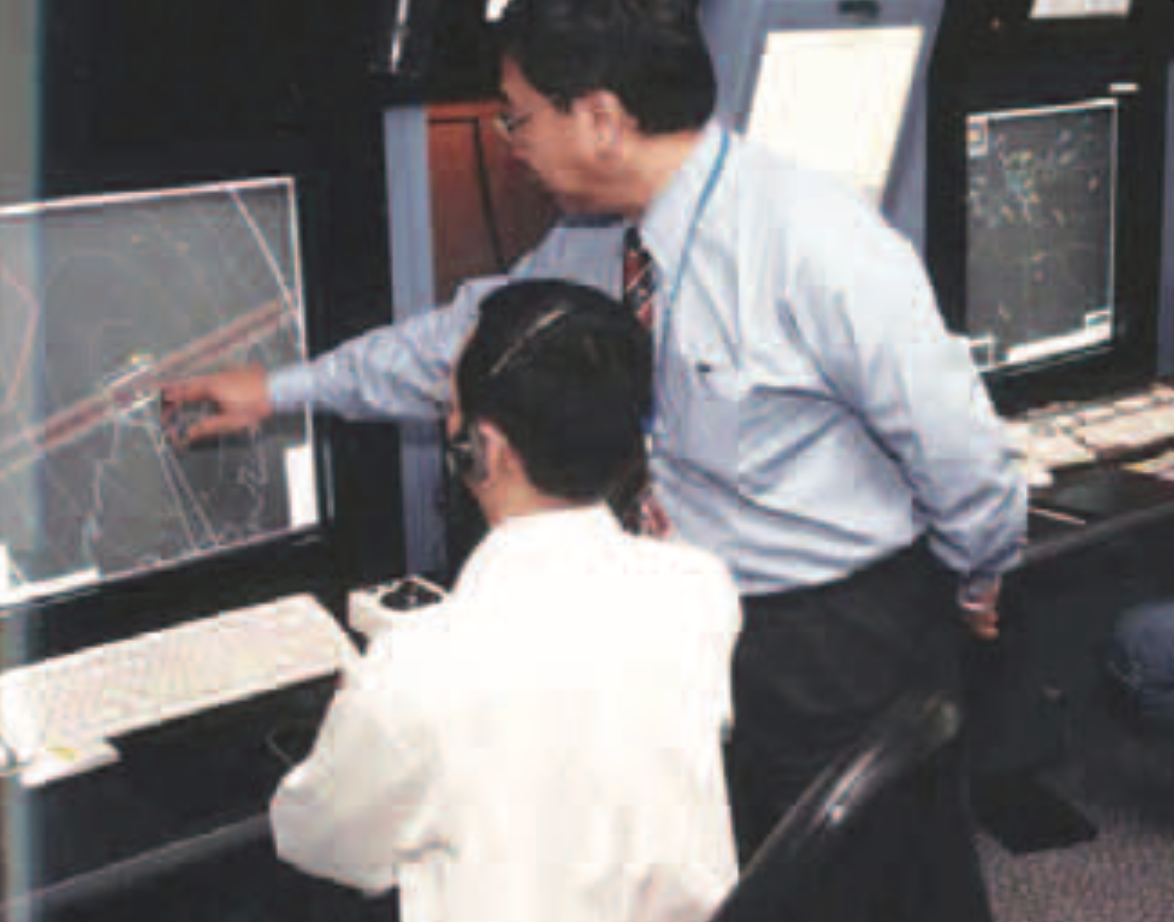
ATC using Precision Runway Monitor

In aviation, precision runway monitor (PRM) is a high-speed, high-precision radar system developed by Raytheon to monitor simultaneous close parallel instrument approaches to airports.

== Radar ==
PRM uses a Monopulse Secondary Surveillance Radar (MSSR) that employs electronically-scanned antennas. Because the PRM has no scan rate restrictions, it is capable of providing a faster update rate (up to 1.0 second) over conventional systems, thereby providing better target presentation in terms of accuracy, resolution, and track prediction. The system is designed to search, track, process, and display SSR-equipped aircraft within airspace of over 30 miles in range and over 15,000 feet in elevation. Visual and audible alerts are generated to warn controllers to take corrective actions.

== Use ==
PRM is one type of radar system that can be used to allow simultaneous approaches on parallel runways that are typically spaced 3,000–4,300 feet (910–1,310 m) to each other. Separating the two final approach courses is a No Transgression Zone (NTZ) with surveillance of that zone provided by two controllers, one for each active approach. The system tracking software provides PRM monitor controllers with aircraft identification, position, speed, projected position, as well as visual and aural alerts.

Airports at which PRM is in use in the United States include Chicago-O'Hare, San Francisco, Detroit, and Atlanta. Internationally only Sydney, Australia uses PRM.

== Training ==
Controllers need to be PRM certified before using the technology. Flight crew wishing to fly PRM approaches are required to undergo specific training related to these approaches before taking part. The training includes practicing the climbing and descending “BREAKOUT” manoeuvre in the simulator.

== See also ==
- Instrument approach
