= Peter Gunn =

American private eye television series (1958–1961)

- Genre: Action; Crime drama
- Created by: Blake Edwards
- Written by: Steffi Barrett; Tony Barrett; Gene L. Coon; Blake Edwards; George Fass; Gertrude Fass; Vick Knight; P. K. Palmer; Lester Pine; Lewis Reed
- Starring: Craig Stevens; Lola Albright; Herschel Bernardi; Hope Emerson; Minerva Urecal; Byron Kane
- Composer: Henry Mancini
- Country of origin: United States
- Original language: English
- No. of seasons: 3
- No. of episodes: 114 (list of episodes)

Production
- Executive producers: Blake Edwards; Gordon Oliver
- Camera setup: Single-camera
- Running time: 30 minutes
- Production company: Spartan Productions

Original release
- Network: NBC (1958–60); ABC (1960–1961)
- Release: September 22, 1958 – September 18, 1961

Peter Gunn is an American private eye television series, starring Craig Stevens as Peter Gunn with Lola Albright as his girlfriend, lounge singer Edie Hart. The series was broadcast by NBC from September 22, 1958, to 1960 and by ABC in 1960–61. The series was created by Blake Edwards, who also wrote 39 episodes and directed nine.

According to Vincent Terrace, Peter Gunn was the first detective series whose character was created especially for television, instead of adapted from other media.

The series is probably best remembered today for its music by film and television composer Henry Mancini, including the iconic "Peter Gunn Theme", which was nominated for an Emmy Award and two Grammys for Mancini. Subsequently, the theme has been performed and recorded by many jazz, rock, and blues musicians. The series was number 17 in the Nielsen ratings for the 1958–59 TV season and number 29 for the 1960–61 TV season.

== Plot ==
Peter Gunn is a suave, well-dressed private investigator whose hair is always in place and who loves cool jazz. Whereas other gumshoes are often coarse and vulgar, Gunn is a sophisticate with expensive tastes. A contemporary article in Life noted that Edwards "deliberately tailored the part after the famous movie smoothie Cary Grant".

Gunn operates in a gloomy waterfront city, the name and location of which is not revealed in the series. He often visits Mother's, a smokey, wharfside jazz club that Gunn uses as his "office", usually meeting new clients there. Gunn has a reputation for integrity and being among the best investigators; he has many reliable informants and is well-connected. His reputation is so good, the police occasionally ask him for help or advice. He sometimes works cases out of state and occasionally out of the country. Gunn was observed in "Murder on the Midway" as "wearing $30 shoes ($321 in 2023 dollars), a $200 suit ($2,144 in 2023 dollars) and carrying a solid gold cigarette lighter". Gunn drives a 1958 two-tone DeSoto two-door hardtop in the first few episodes of the first season, then a 1959 Plymouth Fury convertible with a white top and a car phone. In the third season, Gunn drives a 1960 white Plymouth Fury convertible with a car phone, later changing to a 1961 Plymouth Fury convertible.

Gunn's girlfriend, Edie Hart (Lola Albright), is a sultry singer employed at Mother's; she opens her own restaurant and nightclub in season three, named Edie's. Gunn's pet name for Edie is "Silly". Herschel Bernardi costarred as Lieutenant Jacoby, a jaded, veteran police detective and friend of Gunn's who works at the 13th Precinct. Occasionally, he refers people to Gunn as clients. He is especially notable for his cynical, sardonic wit. In 1959, Bernardi received his only Emmy nomination for the role. Hope Emerson appeared as Mother, who had been a singer and piano player in speakeasies during Prohibition. She received an Emmy nomination for the role. For the second season, Mother was played by Minerva Urecal, following the departure of Emerson for a starring role in The Dennis O'Keefe Show. Associate producer Byron Kane portrayed Barney, the bartender at Mother's; Kane was not credited for playing this role. Bill Chadney appeared as Emmett, Mother's piano player. (Chadney and Albright were married in 1961.)

Both Billy Barty as diminutive pool hustler Babby and Herbert Ellis as beat bistro owner, painter, and sculptor Wilbur, appeared in several episodes as occasional "information resources", as Mother also often is. Capri Candela appeared as Wilbur's girlfriend, Capri. Morris Erby had the recurring role of Sgt. Lee Davis during all three seasons of the show. Frequent director Robert Gist appeared as an actor in different roles in three episodes. James Lanphier portrayed Leslie, the maitre d'hôtel at Edie's restaurant and nightclub during season three.

== Cast ==
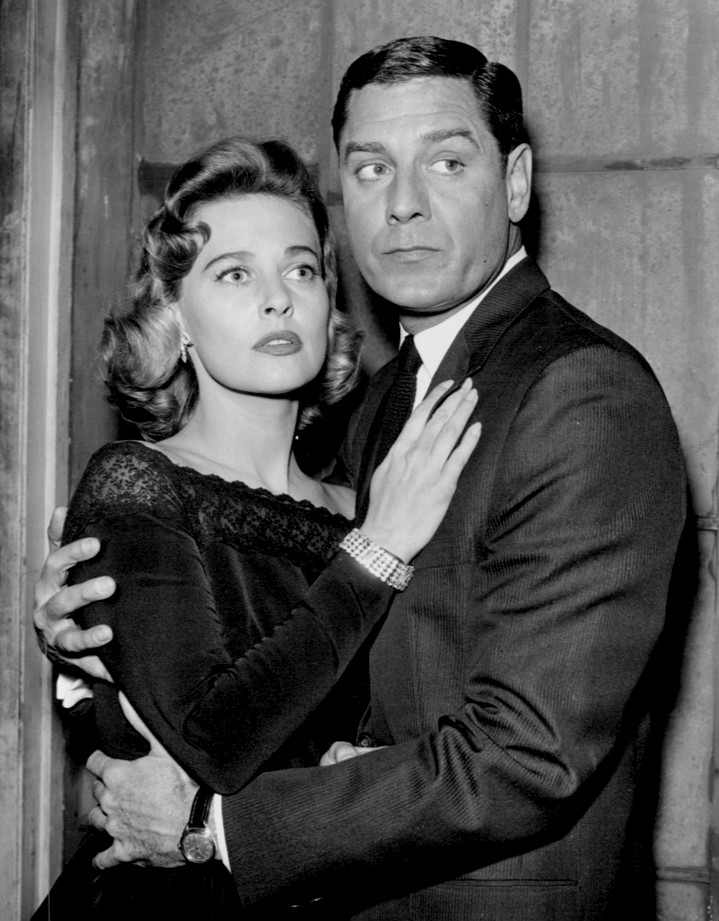
Lola Albright and Craig Stevens

- Craig Stevens as Peter Gunn
- Lola Albright as Edie Hart, a lounge singer and Pete's girlfriend
- Herschel Bernardi as Lieutenant Jacoby, a police detective and friend of Gunn's
- Hope Emerson as Mother, a singer and piano player in speakeasies during Prohibition (season one)
- Minerva Urecal as "Mother" (season two)
- Byron Kane (uncredited) as Barney, the bartender
- Bill Chadney as Emmett, the piano player at Mother's
- Billy Barty as Babby, a pool hustler
- Herbert Ellis as Wilbur, beat bistro owner, painter, and sculptor
- Capri Candela as Capri, Wilbur's girlfriend
- Morris Erby as police Sgt. Lee Davis (seasons one-three)
- James Lanphier as Leslie, maître d (season three)

Frequent director Robert Gist appeared as an actor in different roles in three episodes. Executive producer Gordon Oliver appeared as an actor in different roles in two episodes.

== Episodes ==
Season	Network	Episodes	Premiered:	Ended:
1	NBC	38	September 22, 1958	June 15, 1959
2	NBC	38	September 21, 1959	June 27, 1960
3	ABC	38	October 3, 1960	September 18, 1961

Peter Gunn ran for three seasons starting in late 1958. A total of 114 episodes was produced during the three-season run. Peter Gunn premiered on September 22, 1958, with the episode "The Kill". The first season ran from September 1958 through June 1959 and contained 38 episodes.

== Origin of series ==
Edwards developed Peter Gunn from an earlier fictional detective that he had created. Richard Diamond, Private Detective starred Dick Powell and aired as a radio series from 1949 to 1953. David Janssen later starred in the television adaptation from 1957 to 1960. This character's success prompted his creator to revisit the concept as Peter Gunn. Edwards had earlier written and directed a Mike Hammer television pilot for Brian Keith.

According to Blake Edwards, Gunn was "a present-day soldier of fortune who has found himself a gimmick that pays him a very comfortable living. The gimmick was trouble. People who had major trouble will pay handsomely to get rid of it, and Peter Gunn was a man who will not only accept the pay but do something about it. He knows every element of the city, from cops to crooks. He also, of course, has his soft side and will occasionally take on a charity job for free. But we'll never make the mistake of letting her [Edie] catch him. Never."

For the part of Edie, Edwards said, "We toyed at first with the idea of getting a name singer. But we soon realized it would be impractical to have a name singer cast in what is primarily a straight dramatic role. It wouldn't be fair, either to the singer or the audience. Once that idea was discarded, my first thought was Lola Albright. Lola had been going along well but not terribly well, if you know what I mean. But I'd always felt she had a potential that had never really been tapped. She's sort of two beats off center in the way she talks and sings, and that's what we were looking for."

Speaking of Albright in 1992, Henry Mancini said, "She was perfect casting for that role because she had an off-the-cuff kind of jazz delivery that was very hard to find."

Lola Albright said, "My whole career had been sort of ordinary. Peter Gunn changed all that." Albright said that Blake Edwards had her in mind from the outset, "But he had no idea I could sing. I had just recorded my first album."

Craig Stevens discusses how co-star Lola Albright and he were cast for the show, with cable TV host Skip E. Lowe, in an interview taped in 1993.

Initially, the title of the program was to be Gunn for Hire. The change to Peter Gunn occurred after officials at Paramount Pictures complained that the title was similar to that of the 1942 Paramount film This Gun for Hire.

== Production ==
Besides those directed by Blake Edwards, other episodes were directed by Boris Sagal, Robert Gist, Jack Arnold, Lamont Johnson, Robert Altman (for one episode), and several others. A total of 114 episodes at 30 minutes was produced by Spartan Productions. Season one was filmed at Universal Studios, while seasons two and three were filmed at Metro-Goldwyn-Mayer. Philip H. Lathrop and William W. Spencer were cinematographers on many episodes. Craig Stevens' wardrobe was tailored by Don Richards, and Lola Albright's fashions were by Emeson's for two episodes ("The Vicious Dog", "The Blind Pianist") and by Jax for the remainder of the episodes. Wardrobe was not credited in episode one, "The Kill".

== Music ==
The show's use of modern jazz music was a distinctive touch that helped set the standard for many years to come, with cool jazz themes accompanying every move Gunn made. The music, composed by Henry Mancini, was performed by a small jazz ensemble, which included a number of prominent Los Angeles-based jazz and studio musicians. Trumpeter Pete Candoli, alto saxophonist Ted Nash, flautist Ronny Lang, trombonist Dick Nash, and pianist and future composer John Williams provided most of the improvised jazz solos. Williams plays the piano part on the title music ostinato.

Prominent jazz musicians occasionally made on-screen appearances. Trumpeter Shorty Rogers appeared in the episode titled "The Frog" playing flugelhorn as Lola sings "How High the Moon". Drummer Shelly Manne, in addition to performing on the soundtrack album, was credited with a Special Guest role in the 1959 episode "Keep Smiling" playing drums in the Bamboo Club combo. Brazilian guitarist Laurindo Almeida plays guitar as himself in the 1959 episode "Skin Deep".

In his autobiography Did They Mention the Music? Mancini stated:

The Peter Gunn title theme actually derives more from rock and roll than from jazz. I used guitar and piano in unison, playing what is known in music as an ostinato, which means obstinate. It was sustained throughout the piece, giving it a sinister effect, with some frightened saxophone sounds and some shouting brass. The piece has one chord throughout and a super-simple top line.

The "Peter Gunn Theme" became an instant hit, earning Mancini an Emmy Award nomination and two Grammys. The RCA Victor soundtrack album by Henry Mancini, The Music from Peter Gunn, was voted Album of the Year at the 1st Annual Grammy Awards in 1959 and reached No. 1 in Billboard's Pop LP Charts. The popularity of this album prompted RCA Victor to issue a second Mancini album of Peter Gunn music titled More Music from Peter Gunn. Bandleader Ray Anthony's recording of the theme music reached No. 8 on Billboard's Hot 100. Shelly Manne recorded two jazz albums of themes from the show in 1959, Shelly Manne & His Men Play Peter Gunn and Son of Gunn!!.

"The Peter Gunn Theme" has been recorded and performed by numerous musicians.

In 2019, Jasmine Records released a CD combining both Henry Mancini soundtracks of The Music of Peter Gunn and More Music from Peter Gunn.

The theme was also used in the Spy Hunter arcade video game, and has been used by the Kilgore College Rangerettes as the tryout music for their specialty jazz group since the 1960s.

== Emmy nominations ==
The series was nominated for eight primetime Emmys without wins, all in 1959. They were for Best Dramatic Series - Less than One Hour, Craig Stevens as best lead actor in a drama, Herschel Bernardi as best supporting actor in a drama, Lola Albright and Hope Emerson as best supporting actress in a drama, Henry Mancini for best musical contribution to a television production, and Blake Edwards for best writing and direction of a single episode of a drama series.

== Adaptations ==
The series made the transition to other media. An original novel and a comic-book adaptation were published by Dell Publishing in 1960. The novel, entitled Peter Gunn: Murder to a Jazz Beat, was written by Henry Kane. The comic-book issue Four Color #1087 (published by Dell Comics), entitled "Peter Gunn," featured a photo cover that read, "Pete tries to stop a postage stamp counterfeiter, and gets a parcel of trouble – special delivery!" Lowell Toy Mfg. produced the "Peter Gunn Detective Game", a board game in 1960.

A feature film, Gunn, was released by Paramount Pictures in 1967, scripted by Edwards and William Peter Blatty and directed by Edwards with Stevens reprising the title role. A long-gestating ABC 90-minute pilot, Peter Gunn, aired in April 1989 was written, produced, and directed by Edwards and starred Peter Strauss in the lead role, but the network failed to order a series despite strong ratings and reviews.

In 2001, Edwards and his son, Geoffrey, joined with producers Jeffrey Tinnell and John Michaels and writer Norman Snider in developing an updated television series, The New Peter Gunn for Muse Entertainment in Canada. The project fell through when producers John Woo and David Permut began developing a big-screen remake for Paramount with screenwriter W. Peter Iliff. Once Upon a Time in L.A. was pitched as a possible vehicle for John Travolta or Harrison Ford. Neither revival made it beyond the script stage.

TNT announced a new series was in development in May 2013 from producers Steven Spielberg, Julie Andrews, Lou Pitt, Justin Falvey, and Darryl Frank with writers Scott Rosenberg, Jeff Pinkner, Josh Appelbaum, and André Nemec. The proposed series was not picked up for the 2014–2015 season.

In 2017, Paramount renewed its agreement with the Blake Edwards estate with the intent of developing the property.

== Media ==
From 1992 to 1996, Rhino Entertainment released various episodes of Peter Gunn on VHS cassettes. In 1999, Diamond Entertainment Corporation released a five-cassette set comprising ten episodes. Marathon Music & Video released a seven-cassette box set entitled "TV Cops and Private Eyes", in which an episode of Peter Gunn was included.

In 2002, A&E Home Video released two volume sets of Peter Gunn on DVD in Region 1, which comprise 32 episodes from Season One. These releases used edited-for-syndication versions of episodes.

Timeless Media Group released Peter Gunn – The Complete Series on DVD in Region 1 in 2012. The 12-disc set features all 114 episodes of the series, as well as a bonus CD of Henry Mancini's score, The Music from Peter Gunn
