= Tony Barrett =

American actor, writer, and producer (1916–1974)

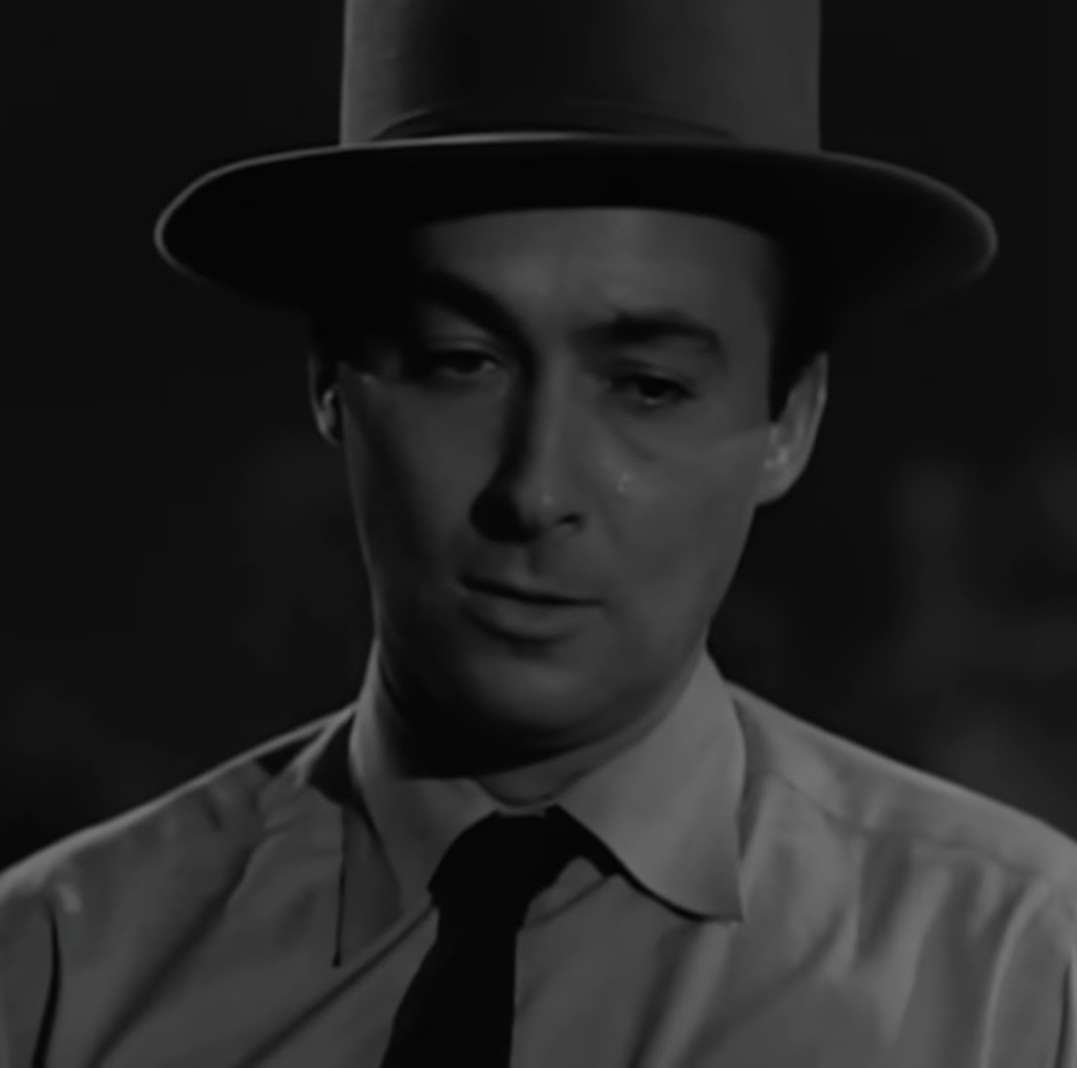
- Barrett in Impact (1949)
- Born: Martin Lefkowitz; May 24, 1916; New York City, U.S.
- Died: November 16, 1974 (aged 58); Los Angeles, California, U.S.
- Resting place: Forest Lawn Memorial Park, Hollywood Hills
- Occupations: Actor; writer; producer
- Years active: 1946–1974
- Spouse: Stephanie "Steffi" Nordli (m. 1956)

Tony Barrett (born Martin Lefkowitz; May 24, 1916 – November 16, 1974) was an American actor, writer, and producer. He worked as a radio and screen actor, screenwriter, and television writer and producer.

== Early life ==
He was born on May 24, 1916, New York City.

== Career ==
Barrett wrote or co-write almost all of the Seasons 2 and 3 episodes of Peter Gunn. He also worked as a main producer and screenwriter for the TV show The Mod Squad and as a screenwriter on the film Good Times starring Sonny & Cher. As an actor, he appeared in the 1949 film Impact.

== Personal life ==
He was married to writer Steffi Barrett. He died of cancer in Los Angeles on November 16, 1974. He was buried in Forest Lawn Memorial Park, Hollywood Hills, California.
