= Breakout =

Breakout or Break Out may refer to:

== Narratives ==
- Breakout character
- Breakthrough role, also known as a "breakout role"

=== Television ===
==== Episodes ====
- "Breakout", African Patrol episode 19 (1958)
- "Breakout", American Dragon: Jake Long season 2, episode 6 (2006)
- "Breakout", A.T.O.M. season 1, episode 20 (2006)
- "Breakout", Body of Proof season 3, episode 12 (2013)
- "Breakout", Callan series 3, episode 8 (1970)
- "Breakout", Centurions episode 47 (1986)
- "Breakout", Combat! season 4, episode 14 (1965)
- "Breakout", Custer episode 8 (1967)
- "Breakout", Delilah & Julius season 2, episode 18 (2008)
- "Breakout", Garrison's Gorillas episode 2 (1967)
- "Breakout", Hero Factory episodes 8–9 (2012)
- "Breakout", Joe 90 episode 22 (1969)
- "Breakout", Max Steel (2000) season 2, episode 13 (2001)
- "Breakout", Megas XLR season 1, episode 7 (2004)
- "Breakout", Mr. and Mrs. North season 1, episode 29 (1953)
- "Breakout", Peter Gunn season 1, episode 27 (1959)
- "Breakout", Prisoner Zero episode 19 (2016)
- "Breakout", Rescue Me (American) season 6, episode 4 (2010)
- "Breakout", Robozuna series 1, episode 5 (2018)
- "Breakout", Spellbinder episode 16 (1995)
- "Breakout", Spiral Zone episode 17 (1987)
- "Breakout", Star Wars Resistance season 2, episode 13 (2019)
- "Breakout", Super Dinosaur episode 24 (2019)
- "Breakout!", The A-Team season 3, episode 13 (1984)
- "Breakout", The Avengers: Earth's Mightiest Heroes season 2, episodes 6–7 (2010)
- "Breakout", The Bill series 7, episode 105 (1991)
- "Breakout", The Felony Squad season 1, episode 22 (1967)
- "Breakout", The Glades season 2, episode 13 (2011)
- "Breakout", The Rough Riders episode 2 (1958)
- "Breakout", V: The Series episode 3 (1985)
- "Breakout", Viper season 3, episode 11 (1998)
- "Breakout", Wanted Dead or Alive season 2, episode 4 (1959)
- "The Breakout", Gallipoli episode 5 (2015)
- "The Breakout", Spyforce episode 30 (1972)
- "The Breakout", Stretch Armstrong and the Flex Fighters special 1 (2018)
- "The Breakout", The Batman season 4, episode 5 (2006)
- "The Breakout", The Broken Marriage Vow season 2, episode 26 (2022)
- "The Breakout", The Iron Heart season 1, episode 4 (2022)

==== Shows ====
- Breakout (Singaporean TV series), a 2010–2011 Singaporean TV drama broadcast by MediaCorp Channel 8
- Breakout (Canadian TV program), a 2010–2013 Canadian documentary television program dramatizing real life prison breakouts that aired on National Geographic Channel
- Breakout, an Indonesian NET music program

=== Film ===
- Danger Within, a 1959 British film retitled Breakout for the U.S. market
- Break Out (film), a 2002 South Korean film
- Breakout (1959 film), a British drama film
- Breakout (1970 film), an American TV film which broadcast on NBC
- Breakout (1975 film), a film starring Charles Bronson and Robert Duvall
- Breakout (1997 film), a British television film starring Neil Dudgeon and Samantha Bond

== Music ==
- Breakout (band), a Polish blues/rock band

=== Albums ===
- Breakout (Spyro Gyra album), 1986
- Breakout (Miley Cyrus album), 2008
- Breakout (Johnny Hammond album), 1971
- Break Out (Pointer Sisters album), 1983
- Breakout (Swing Out Sister album), 2001
- Break Out (Soulive album), 2005
- Breakout...!!!, by Mitch Ryder & The Detroit Wheels, 1966

=== Songs ===
- "Breakout" (Swing Out Sister song), 1986
- "Breakout" (Foo Fighters song), 2000
- "Breakout" (Miley Cyrus song), 2008
- "Breakout" (Cryoshell song), 2012
- "Breakout", by Black Sabbath from Never Say Die!
- "Breakout", by Sean Paul from The Trinity
- "Breakout", by Bon Jovi from Bon Jovi
- "Breakout", by Ratt from Ratt
- "Breakout", by Ace Frehley from Frehley's Comet
- "Breakout", from the first act of Lord of the Dance
- "Breakout", by Margaret Durante from Shake It Up: Break It Down soundtrack
- "Break Out", 1966 single by Mitch Ryder & The Detroit Wheels
- "Break Out", 1968 single by Dave Dee, Dozy, Beaky, Mick & Tich
- "Break Out", 1968 song by Normie Rowe
- "Break Out!" (Tohoshinki song), 2010
- "Break Out!", 1996 song by Nanase Aikawa
- "Break Out! Break Out!", 2005 song by All Time Low from The Party Scene

== Electronics ==
- Breakout board, hardware that allows hand-access to densely spaced pins on a microchip
- Breakout box, an electrical device that separates individual signal paths in a multi-conductor input connector into separate connectors

== Gaming ==
- Breakout (video game), an influential 1976 arcade game by Atari, and later home versions
  - Breakout clone, a video game with gameplay similar to the original Breakout
- Breakout (magazine), a gaming magazine first published in 1981

== Slang ==
- Breakout, slang for a prison escape
- Breakout, a North American slang term for acne vulgaris

== Other uses ==
- Breakout (military), a military operation to end a situation of encirclement or siege
- Breakout (technical analysis), when prices pass through, and stay through an area of support or resistance
- Breakout session or breakout room, when participants in a meeting change from a plenary session to choices of workshop sessions
- Breakout, a maneuver when an aircraft is instructed to fly away from the approach course during simultaneous approaches

== See also ==
- Breakout Creek, Adelaide, South Australia
- Outbreak (disambiguation)
- Break (disambiguation)
- Out (disambiguation)
