= List of Peter Gunn episodes =

Peter Gunn is an American private eye television series which aired on the NBC and later ABC television networks from 1958 to 1961. The show's creator (and also writer and director on occasion) was Blake Edwards. It was also directed by Boris Sagal, Robert Gist, Jack Arnold, Lamont Johnson, Robert Altman (one episode only), and several others. A total of 114 thirty-minute episodes were produced by Spartan Productions. Season one was filmed at Universal Studios, seasons two and three were filmed at Metro-Goldwyn-Mayer. Philip H. Lathrop and William W. Spencer were cinematographers on many episodes. Craig Stevens' wardrobe was tailored by Don Richards and Lola Albright's fashions by Emeson and by Jax.

== Series overview ==
Peter Gunn ran for three seasons starting in late 1958. A total of 114 episodes were produced during the three-season run.

Season	Episodes	Originally released		
Season	Episodes	First released	Last released	Network
1	38	September 22, 1958	June 15, 1959	NBC
2	38	September 21, 1959	June 27, 1960	NBC
3	38	October 3, 1960	September 18, 1961	ABC

== Episodes ==
=== Season 1 (1958–59) ===
Peter Gunn premiered on September 22, 1958, with the episode "The Kill". The first season ran from September 1958 through June 1959, and contained 38 episodes.

No. overall	No. in season	Title	Directed by	Written by	Original release date	Prod. code
1	1	"The Kill"	Blake Edwards	Blake Edwards	September 22, 1958	12639
2	2	"Streetcar Jones"	Blake Edwards	Al C. Ward	September 29, 1958	12642
3	3	"The Vicious Dog"	David O. McDearmon	Blake Edwards	October 6, 1958	12640
4	4	"The Blind Pianist"	Blake Edwards	Judy George, George W. George	October 13, 1958	12638
5	5	"The Frog"	David O. McDearmon	Blake Edwards	October 20, 1958	12643
6	6	"The Chinese Hangman"	Blake Edwards	Lewis Reed, Vick Knight	October 27, 1958	12641
7	7	"Lynn's Blues"	Blake Edwards	Lewis Reed, Blake Edwards	November 3, 1958	12840
8	8	"Rough Buck"	Blake Edwards	Tony Barrett	November 10, 1958	12839
9	9	"Image of Sally"	David O. McDearmon	Lewis Reed, Blake Edwards	November 17, 1958	12838
10	10	"The Man with the Scar"	David O. McDearmon	Ken Kolb, Lewis Reed	November 24, 1958	12837
11	11	"Death House Testament"	Blake Edwards	George Fass, Gertrude Fass, Blake Edwards	December 1, 1958	12843
12	12	"The Torch"	David O. McDearmon	Lewis Reed, Vic Knight	December 8, 1958	12836
13	13	"The Jockey"	Lamont Johnson	Lewis Reed	December 15, 1958	12842
14	14	"Sisters of the Friendless"	David O. McDearmon	Henry F. Greenberg, Malvin Wald	December 22, 1958	12841
15	15	"The Leaper"	Paul Stewart	Robert Blees	December 29, 1958	13980
16	16	"The Fuse"	David O. McDearmon	Tony Barrett	January 5, 1959	13997
17	17	"Let's Kill Timothy"	Blake Edwards	Lewis Reed	January 19, 1959	13998
18	18	"The Missing Night Watchman"	Boris Sagal	Blake Edwards	January 26, 1959	15084
19	19	"Murder on the Midway"	David O. McDearmon	P.K. Palmer, Blake Edwards	February 2, 1959	13982
20	20	"Pecos Pete"	Robert Ellis Miller	Lewis Reed	February 9, 1959	13983
21	21	"Scuba"	Boris Sagal	P.K. Palmer	February 16, 1959	13984
22	22	"Edie Finds a Corpse"	Walter E. Grauman	P.K. Palmer	February 23, 1959	15085
23	23	"The Dirty Word"	Boris Sagal	Tony Barrett	March 2, 1959	13985
24	24	"The Ugly Frame"	Jack Arnold	George Fass, Gertrude Fass, Lewis Reed	March 9, 1959	15086
25	25	"The Lederer Story"	Boris Sagal	Lewis Reed, Charles Hoffman	March 16, 1959	13986
26	26	"Keep Smiling"	Jack Arnold	Lester Aaron Pine, Lewis Reed	March 23, 1959	15087
27	27	"Breakout"	Boris Sagal	Lewis Reed	March 30, 1959	13987
28	28	"Pay Now, Kill Later"	Boris Sagal	Lester Aaron Pine	April 6, 1959	13988
29	29	"Skin Deep"	Boris Sagal	Tony Berret, Steffi Barret	April 13, 1959	13989
30	30	"February Girl"	Boris Sagal	Lewis Reed, Robert C. Dennis	April 20, 1959	13990
31	31	"Love Me to Death"	Jack Arnold	Lester Aaron Pine	April 27, 1959	13991
32	32	"The Family Affair"	Lamont Johnson	Lewis Reed, P.K. Palmer	May 4, 1959	13992
33	33	"Lady Wind Bell's Fan"	Walter E. Grauman	William Spier	May 11, 1959	13993
34	34	"Bullet for a Badge"	Jack Arnold	Tony Berret, Steffi Barret	May 18, 1959	13994
35	35	"Kill from Nowhere"	Lamont Johnson	Tony Berret, Steffi Barret	May 25, 1959	13995
36	36	"Vendetta"	Jack Arnold	Lewis Reed and Herschel Bernardi	June 1, 1959	13996
37	37	"The Coffin"	Lamont Johnson	Lewis Reed	June 8, 1959	15088
38	38	"The Portrait"	Boris Sagal	Irwin Winehouse, A. Sanford Wolf	June 15, 1959	15089

=== Season 2 (1959–60) ===
The second season premiered on September 21, 1959, with the episode "Protection". It ran from September 1959 through June 1960, and, like the first season, contained 38 episodes.

No. overall	No. in season	Title	Directed by	Written by	Original release date	Prod. code
39	1	"Protection"	Boris Sagal	Tony Barrett, Lewis Reed	September 21, 1959	15498
40	2	"Crisscross"	Boris Sagal	Lewis Reed	September 28, 1959	15499
41	3	"Edge of the Knife"	Boris Sagal	Tony Berret, Steffi Barret	October 5, 1959	15500
42	4	"The Comic"	Blake Edwards	Blake Edwards	October 12, 1959	15501
43	5	"Death Is a Red Rose"	Boris Sagal	Lewis Reed, Tony Barrett	October 19, 1959	15502
44	6	"The Young Assassins"	Boris Sagal	Tony Barret, Lewis Reed	October 26, 1959	15503
45	7	"The Feathered Doll"	Boris Sagal	Lewis Reed, Tony Barrett	November 2, 1959	15504
46	8	"Kidnap"	Boris Sagal	Tony Barrett, Lewis Reed	November 16, 1959	15505
47	9	"The Rifle"	George Stevens, Jr.	Lewis Reed, Tony Barrett	November 23, 1959	15506
48	10	"The Game"	Boris Sagal	Lester Aaron Pine	November 30, 1959	15507
49	11	"The Price Is Murder"	Boris Sagal	Tony Barrett, Lewis Reed	December 7, 1959	15508
50	12	"The Briefcase"	Blake Edwards	Lester Aaron Pine	December 14, 1959	15509
51	13	"Terror on the Campus"	Boris Sagal	Tony Barrett, Lewis Reed	December 21, 1959	15510
52	14	"The Wolfe Case"	Lamont Johnson	Tony Barrett, Lewis Reed	December 28, 1959	15511
53	15	"Hot Money"	Alan Crosland, Jr.	Lester Aaron Pine	January 4, 1960	15512
54	16	"Spell of Murder"	Lamont Johnson	Lewis Reed, Tony Barrett	January 11, 1960	15513
55	17	"The Grudge"	Lamont Johnson	Lewis Reed, Tony Barrett	January 18, 1960	15514
56	18	"Fill the Cup"	Boris Sagal	Tony Barrett, Lewis Reed	January 25, 1960	16354
57	19	"See No Evil"	Alan Crosland, Jr.	Tony Barrett, Lewis Reed	February 1, 1960	16355
58	20	"Sentenced"	Lamont Johnson	Lewis Reed	February 8, 1960	16356
59	21	"The Hunt"	Jack Arnold	Lewis Reed	February 15, 1960	16357
60	22	"Hollywood Calling"	Alan Crosland Jr.	Ben Perry, Richard Sokolove	February 29, 1960	16358
61	23	"Sing a Song of Murder"	Lamont Johnson	Lewis Reed, Tony Barrett	March 7, 1960	16359
62	24	"The Long, Long Ride"	Alan Crosland, Jr.	Tony Barrett, Lewis Reed	March 14, 1960	16360
63	25	"The Deadly Proposition"	Lamont Johnson	Tony Barrett, Lewis Reed	March 21, 1960	16361
64	26	"The Murder Clause"	Boris Sagal	Tony Barrett, Lewis Reed	March 28, 1960	16362
65	27	"The Dummy"	Lamont Johnson	Lewis Reed, Tony Barrett	April 4, 1960	16363
66	28	"Slight Touch of Homicide"	Lamont Johnson	Tony Barrett, Lewis Reed	April 11, 1960	16364
67	29	"Wings of an Angel"	Lamont Johnson	Lewis Reed, Tony Barrett	April 18, 1960	16365
68	30	"Death Watch"	Alan Crosland, Jr.	Lewis Reed, Tony Barrett	April 25, 1960	16366
69	31	"Witness in the Window"	Boris Sagal	Tony Barrett, Lewis Reed	May 2, 1960	16367
70	32	"The Best Laid Plans"	Alan Crosland, Jr.	Tony Barrett, Lewis Reed	May 9, 1960	16865
71	33	"Send a Thief"	Alan Crosland, Jr.	Tony Barrett, Lewis Reed	May 16, 1960	16866
72	34	"The Semi-Private Eye"	Gene Reynolds	Gene L. Coon	May 23, 1960	17153
73	35	"Letter of the Law"	Robert Gist	Tony Barrett, Lewis Reed	May 30, 1960	16867
74	36	"The Crossbow"	Alan Crosland, Jr.	Tony Barrett, Lewis Reed	June 6, 1960	16868
75	37	"The Heiress"	Robert Gist	Lewis Reed, Tony Barrett	June 13, 1960	16869
76	38	"Baby Shoes"	Alan Crosland, Jr.	Lewis Reed, Tony Barrett	June 27, 1960	16870

=== Season 3 (1960–61) ===
The third and final season premiered on October 3, 1960, with the episode "The Passenger". It ran from October 1960 through September 1961, and consisted of 38 episodes.

No. overall	No. in season	Title	Directed by	Written by	Original release date	Prod. code
77	1	"The Passenger"	Alan Crosland, Jr.	Lewis Reed, Tony Barrett	October 3, 1960	18742
78	2	"Mask of Murder"	Alan Crosland, Jr.	Tony Barrett, Lewis Reed	October 10, 1960	18743
79	3	"The Maitre D'"	Alan Crosland, Jr.	Arthur Ross	October 17, 1960	18744
80	4	"The Candidate"	Robert Gist	Lewis Reed, Tony Barrett	October 24, 1960	18745
81	5	"The Judgment"	Alan Crosland, Jr.	Tony Barrett, Lewis Reed	October 31, 1960	18746
82	6	"The Death Frame"	Robert Gist	Lewis Reed, Tony Barrett	November 7, 1960	18747
83	7	"Death Across the Board"	Alan Crosland, Jr.	Tony Barrett	November 14, 1960	18748
84	8	"Tramp Steamer"	Gene Reynolds	Jack McEdward	November 21, 1960	18749
85	9	"The Long Green Kill"	Robert Gist	Tony Barrett	November 28, 1960	18750
86	10	"Take Five for Murder"	Paul Stanley	Tony Barrett	December 5, 1960	18751
87	11	"Dream Big, Dream Deadly"	Robert Gist	Tony Barrett	December 12, 1960	18752
88	12	"Sepi"	Alan Crosland Jr.	Tony Barrett	December 19, 1960	18753
89	13	"A Tender Touch"	Robert Gist	Lewis Reed, Tony Barrett	December 26, 1960	18754
90	14	"The Royal Roust"	Robert Gist	Tony Barrett, Lewis Reed	January 2, 1961	18755
91	15	"Bullet in Escrow"	Paul Stanley	Lewis Reed, Tony Barrett	January 9, 1961	18756
92	16	"Jacoby's Vacation"	Alan Crosland Jr.	Tom Waldman	January 16, 1961	18757
93	17	"Blind Item"	Robert Gist	Jack McEdward	January 23, 1961	19898
94	18	"Death Is a Sore Loser"	Robert Gist	Tony Barrett	January 30, 1961	20858
95	19	"I Know It's Murder"	Alan Crosland Jr.	Bernard C. Schoenfeld	February 13, 1961	19899
96	20	"A Kill and a Half"	Robert Gist	Tony Barrett	February 20, 1961	19900
97	21	"Than a Serpent's Tooth"	Byron Kane	Tony Barrett	February 27, 1961	19901
98	22	"The Deep End"	Robert Gist	Bill A. McCormack	March 6, 1961	19902
99	23	"Portrait in Leather"	Alan Crosland Jr.	Tony Barrett	March 13, 1961	20859
100	24	"Come Dance with Me and Die"	Robert Gist	Tony Barrett	March 20, 1961	20860
101	25	"Cry Love, Cry Murder"	Alan Crosland Jr.	Tony Barrett	March 27, 1961	19903
102	26	"A Penny Saved"	Robert Gist	Tony Barrett	April 3, 1961	20861
103	27	"Short Motive"	Robert Gist	Tony Barrett	April 10, 1961	19904
104	28	"The Murder Bond"	Robert Altman	Tony Barrett, Lewis Reed	April 24, 1961	19905
105	29	"The Most Deadly Angel"	David Lowell Rich	Harry Steiner	May 1, 1961	19906
106	30	"Till Death Do Us Part"	Robert Gist	Tony Barrett	May 8, 1961	19907
107	31	"Last Resort"	Robert Sparr	Tony Barrett	May 15, 1961	19908
108	32	"A Matter of Policy"	Robert Gist	Steffi Barrett, Tony Barrett	May 22, 1961	19909
109	33	"A Bullet for the Boy"	David Lowell Rich	Steffi Barrett, Tony Barrett	May 29, 1961	19910
110	34	"Death Is a Four Letter Word"	Tony Barrett	Steffi Barrett, Tony Barrett	June 5, 1961	19911
111	35	"Deadly Intrusion"	Robert Gist	Steffi Barrett, Tony Barrett	June 12, 1961	19912
112	36	"Voodoo"	Alan Crosland Jr.	Frank Waldman	June 19, 1961	19913
113	37	"Down the Drain"	Robert Gist	Blake Edwards	June 26, 1961	19914
114	38	"Murder on the Line"	Robert Gist	Blake Edwards	September 18, 1961	20862
