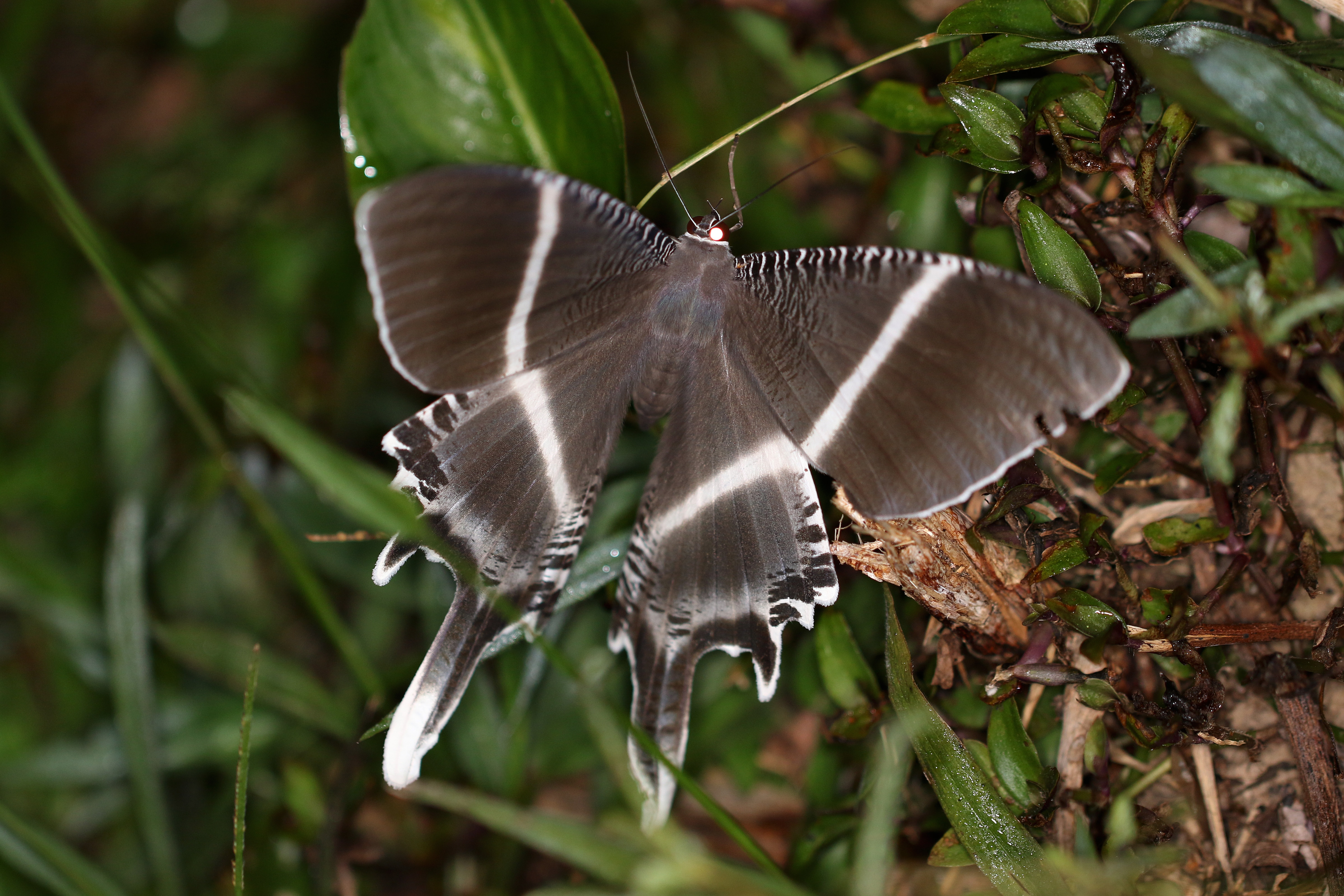
- Lyssa menoetius, Sabah, Borneo

Scientific classification
- Domain: Eukaryota
- Kingdom: Animalia
- Phylum: Arthropoda
- Class: Insecta
- Order: Lepidoptera
- Family: Uraniidae
- Genus: Lyssa
- Species: L. menoetius

Binomial name
- Lyssa menoetius Hopffer, 1856

Synonyms
- Nyctalemon hector Walker, 1856; Nyctalemon longicaudus Schaufuss, 1870

= Lyssa menoetius =

Species of moth

Lyssa menoetius is a moth of the family Uraniidae. The species was first described by German entomologist Hopffer in 1856.

== Distribution ==
The species is native to Borneo, Sangihe, Sulawesi, and the Philippines. A few specimens have been found recently in Southern Thailand. It is mostly found in forested areas at moderate elevations. The larvae feed on the leaves of Omphalea bracteata and O. sargentii.
