= Byron Kane =

American film actor and producer (1923–1984)

- Born: May 9, 1923
- Died: April 10, 1984 (aged 60)

Byron Kane (May 9, 1923 – April 10, 1984) was a radio and film actor and producer. He was known for his collaborations with Blake Edwards and for his voice work.

== Biography ==
Kane was born in Vermont, but grew up in California. He'd wanted to work in radio since the time he was a child. Hanging around the studios he got to know some of the industry people, running errands for producers and directors. His debut in radio came in the summer of 1940 when, at age 17 and in between his junior and senior year of high school, he went over to the CBS Columbia Square studios late one evening and noticed people heading inside. It was very late for this many actors to be entering the studio and he realized an audition must have been taking place. Kane followed actress Jane Morgan inside.

In the Summer of 1940, when CBS’ Lux Radio Theatre departed from the airwaves for its annual summer vacation, head of CBS William Paley decided to fill Lux’s time slot with a new series called Forecast. It ushered in an era of pilots for public consumption. The Lux Radio Theatre was an hour-long production which aired on Monday evenings from 9-10PM eastern time. When Forecast premiered on July 15th, it did so with two half-hour productions—The first from New York, and the second from Hollywood. This became standard as Summer progressed.

The idea was simple: Fourteen pilots over the course of eight weeks. Each coast would also produce one hour-long show. Network announcers invited listeners to write to CBS with feedback. The most popular shows were earmarked. Forecast gave rise to Suspense, Duffy’s Tavern, and eventually Hopalong Cassidy.

Once inside, Kane found that a young director named Norman Corwin was holding auditions for a Forecast episode which had Helen Deutsch adapting a portion of Sinclair Lewis' novel Bethel Merriday. Kane read for the part of Bethel's boyfriend Charlie, to his surprise getting hired. A few days later, on August 26th, this adaptation went on live over CBS's full coast-to-coast network. Kane found himself acting opposite Lurene Tuttle, Howard DaSilva (as Mr. Keizer), and much to his surprise as Bethel (because she wasn't at the audition) Academy Award nominee Margaret Sullavan, who'd just starred opposite James Stewart in The Shop Around The Corner. Kane more than held his own.

Kane narrated the short Polly Wants a Doctor (1944).

While Kane was stationed at Camp Fannin in 1943, he helped with Orson Welles's production of a radio program "to officially launch the Fifth War Loan drive." Kane had been a member of Welles's The Mercury Theatre on the Air. He worked in a war plant in 1944.

Kane appeared on many radio programs during the 1940s and '50s, including Favorite Story, Gunsmoke, The NBC University Theater, Plays for Americans, Suspense, Yours Truly, Johnny Dollar and On Stage.

Kane served as associate producer of Blake Edwards' detective television series Peter Gunn (1958-61); He also appeared uncredited in the show in the recurring role of Barney, the bartender.

He voiced Peter Jones, a Black character, on the animated series The Hardy Boys (1969).

Kane appeared as the United States Secretary of State (based on Henry Kissinger) in Blake Edwards' 1976 comedy hit The Pink Panther Strikes Again, starring Peter Sellers. Beginning in 1979, Kane performed on multiple episodes of Sears Radio Theater, a radio anthology series broadcast over the CBS Radio Network and later, the Mutual Broadcasting System.

Kane made his final acting appearance in Blake Edwards' comedy film S.O.B. (1981)

=== Personal life and death ===
Among Kane's personal friends were singer and actor Sammy Davis Jr, film director Hal Ashby and actor Jeff Chandler. Kane served as a pallbearer at Chandler's funeral in 1961.

Kane died in Los Angeles on April 10, 1984, two weeks after suffering a heart attack; he was 60 years old.
