= Bethel Merriday =

1940 novel by Sinclair Lewis

- Author: Sinclair Lewis
- Language: English
- Genre: Fiction, Theatre-fiction
- Published: 1940
- Publisher: J. Cape
- Publication place: USA
- Pages: 382

Bethel Merriday is a 1940 novel by Sinclair Lewis. It is a book depicting the journey of an aspiring young actress, and her life in a touring company. The company is performing a then-modern update on Romeo and Juliet.
