= Simultaneous opposite direction parallel runway operations =

Air traffic control method

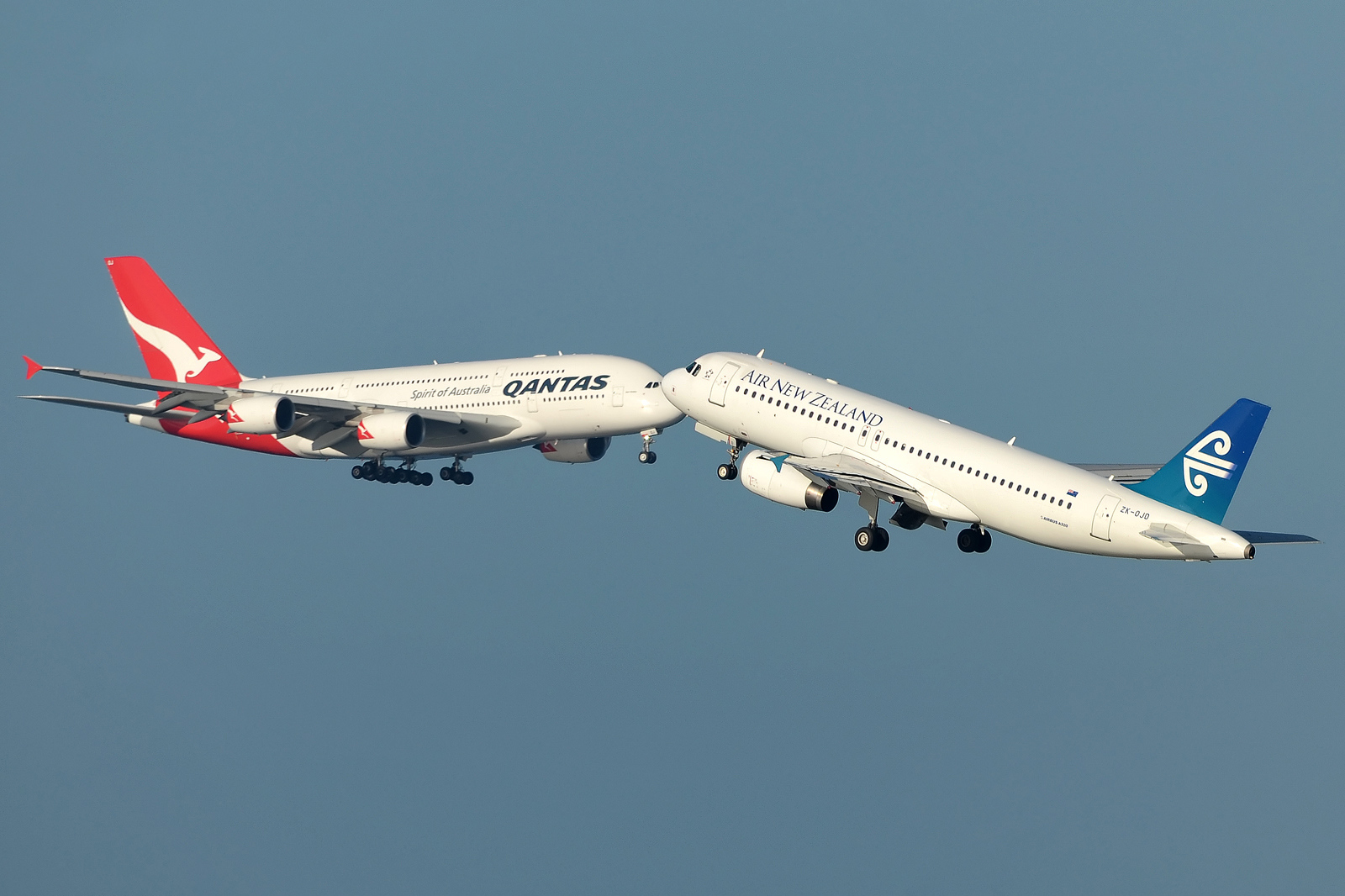
SODPROPS in action at Sydney Airport with the Qantas Airbus A380 on short final for RWY 34L just as the Air New Zealand Airbus A320 becomes airborne from RWY 16L.

Simultaneous opposite direction parallel runway operations, or SODPROPS, is a method of coordinating the arrival and departure of aircraft on parallel runways. Airports that have two parallel runways can use this method so that aircraft can arrive on one runway while another aircraft can depart simultaneously in the opposite direction on the parallel runway. For example, an aircraft can depart runway 09R while another aircraft lands on runway 27R. This potentially maximizes the efficient coordination of aircraft in certain weather conditions as well as aiding in noise abatement.

== See also ==
- Simultaneous approach
- Instrument landing system
- Air traffic control
