= Outbreak (disambiguation) =

An outbreak is a sudden increase in occurrences of a disease in a particular time and place.

Outbreak may also refer to:

== Arts and entertainment ==
- Outbreak (band), an American punk band
- Outbreak (album), by Outbreak, 2009
- Outbreak (DJ) (born 1984), Australian DJ and producer
- Outbreak (1995 film), an American disaster film
- Outbreak (2024 film), a zombie mystery thriller film
- Outbreak (novel), a novel by Robin Cook
- "Outbreak" (Dead Set), a 2008 television episode
- "Outbreak" (Spaceballs: The Animated Series), a 2008 television episode
- "Outbreak" (Under the Dome), a 2013 television episode
- Kaisen: Outbreak, a professional wrestling event
- Resident Evil Outbreak, a video game

== Other uses ==
- Super outbreak
- Tornado outbreak

== See also ==
- Breakout (disambiguation)
