= Simultaneous approach =

Instrument approach operations

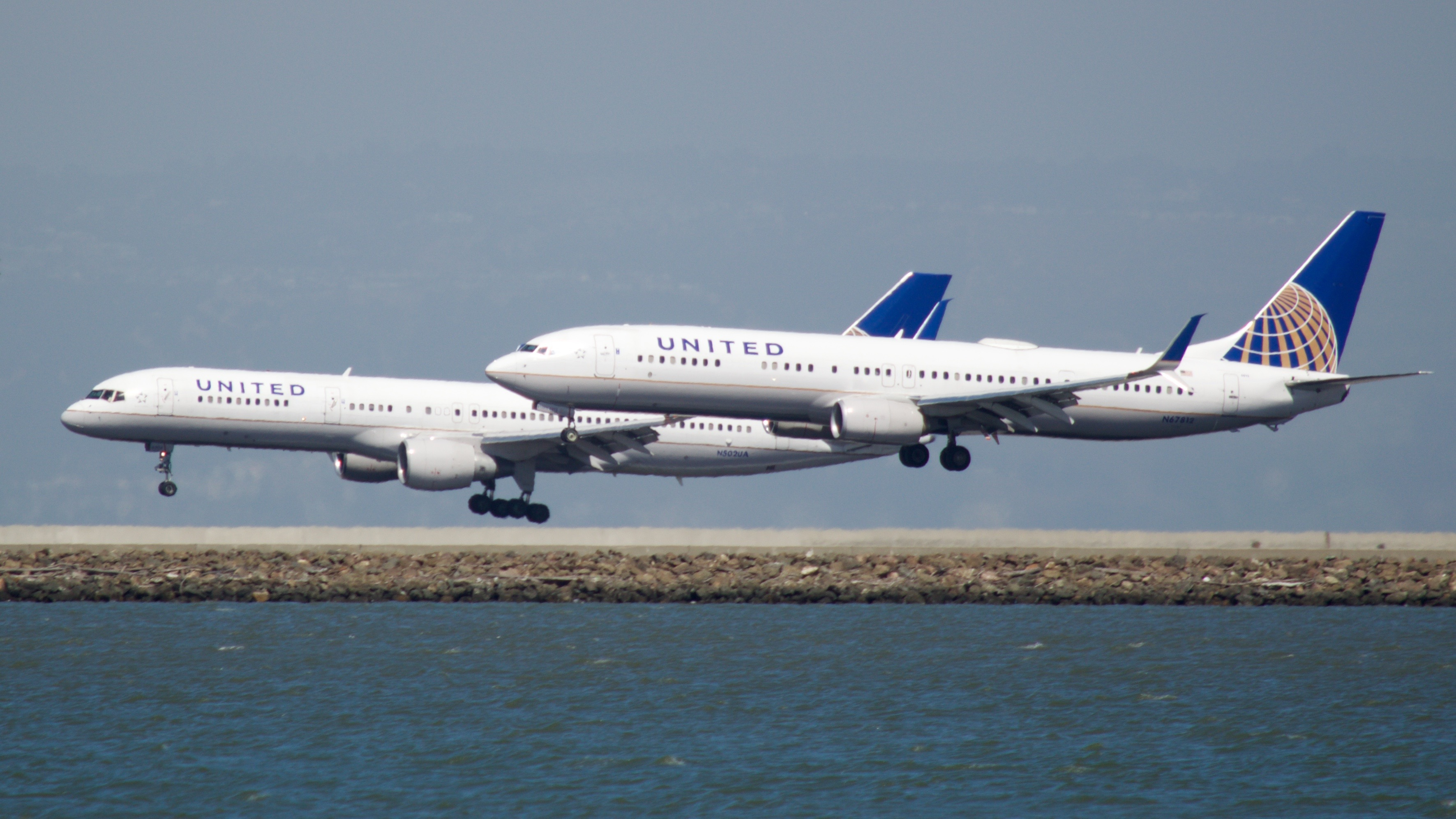
Boeing 737 (near) and 757 (far) landing at San Francisco International Airport for runway 28L and 28R, which are spaced 750 ft (230 m) apart and were approved for simultaneous dependent approach to closely-spaced parallel runways, a practice that ended in 2026.

In aviation, simultaneous approaches are instrument approach operations conducted simultaneously on multiple parallel or converging runways. Simultaneous approaches are authorized for ILS, RNAV, and GLS approaches. The goal of conducting simultaneous approaches is to increase arrival capacity.

== No transgression zone and normal operating zone ==
A Normal Operating Zone (NOZ) is defined airspace extending to both sides of a final approach course in an instrument approach. A No Transgression Zone (NTZ) is airspace established between extended runway center lines, where flights are normally not allowed. In the United States, according to Federal Aviation Administration (FAA), when runway spacing is no more than 3,400 ft (1,000 m), the NOZ is established with a constant width of 700 ft (200 m). When runway spacing is at least 3,400 ft (1,000 m), the NTZ is established with a constant width of 700 ft (200 m), located equidistant between parallel runways or SOIA final approach courses. International Civil Aviation Organization (ICAO) recommends establishing the NTZ based on surveillance capability and runway spacing, and NOZ's width determined by the NTZ.

=== Breakout ===
In case of an encroachment of the NTZ, an air traffic controller (ATC) will issue the threatened aircraft a "breakout" — a vector off the final approach course, which pilots must fly manually to be able to quickly respond. ICAO mandates that the break off vectoring must not result in a heading change of more than 45°.

== Types ==
=== Simultaneous dependent approach ===
In a dependent approach, the trailing aircraft "depends" on the location of the leading aircraft when approaching to parallel runways.: A: Runway centerline distance between parallel runways (runway spacing); B: Diagonal separation (may be more than minimum depending on the required in-trail separation); C: In-trail separation; NTZ: No transgression zone

Simultaneous dependent approaches are for parallel approaches where aircraft are separated by their diagonal distances, a procedure known as staggering. In the United States, these approach procedures can be applied to runways with centerlines separated by usually at least 2,500 ft (760 m) and up to 9,000 ft (2,700 m). ICAO recommends the procedure to be used when runways are spaced by 3,000 ft (900 m) or more. To mitigate wake turbulence, ATC will provide aircraft wake category pairing for the approaching traffic. Unlike independent approaches, simultaneous dependent approaches do not require NTZ or final monitor controllers.

ATC will provide a vertical separation of 1,000 ft (300 m) or a radar separation of at least of 3 nautical miles (5.6 km; 3.5 mi) between aircraft during "turn on", the stage of the approach immediately before the parallel approach begins. After that, ATC provides the following minimum diagonal radar separation based on runway spacing:

- 1 nautical mile, for 2,500 ft (760 m) (FAA) or 3,000 ft (910 m) (ICAO) ≤ runway spacing ≤ 3,600 ft (1,100 m);
- 1.5 nautical miles, for 3,600 ft (1,100 m) < runway spacing ≤ 8,300 ft (2,500 m);
- 2 nautical miles, for 8,300 ft (2,500 m) < runway spacing ≤ 9,000 ft (2,700 m).

For airports with less than 2,500 ft (760 m) runway spacing, also known as "Closely-Spaced Parallel Runways" (CSPR), ATC will provide no less than the minimum authorized diagonal separation with the leader always arriving on the same runway. As of 2023, eight airports across the United States have approved simultaneous dependent approach to CSPR.

=== Simultaneous independent parallel instrument approaches ===
Simultaneous independent parallel instrument approaches (SIPIA) permit simultaneous approaches to parallel runways with centerlines separated by at least 4,300 feet. Unlike dependent parallel approaches, independent parallel approaches do not use staggered radar separation procedures. For runways between 4,300 and 9,000 feet (9,200 feet for airport elevation 5,000 feet) apart, a no transgression zone final monitor controller is assigned.

FAA requires missed approach courses for dual or triple SIPIA operations to diverge by at least 45°. Quadruple SIPIA operations require special analysis to develop the procedure. ICAO requires adjacent missed approach courses to diverge by 30°. When an aircraft is being vectored to intercept the final approach course, the intercept angle must not exceed 30°, and a straight and level flight of at least 1 nautical mile must be provided prior to reaching final approach course.

=== Simultaneous close parallel PRM approach ===
Precision runway monitor (PRM) is an advanced electronic scan radar or multilateration monitoring system intended to increase the use of multiple, closely-spaced parallel runways in instrument conditions by use of high resolution displays with alert algorithms and higher aircraft position update rate.

Simultaneous close parallel (SCP) PRM approaches permit runway spacing between 2,500ft and 4,300ft, but under certain adverse weather conditions, such operations may be suspended due to safety concerns and large number of deviation alerts. The NTZ and NOZ between the final approach courses are considered independent; one ATC is assigned for each approach course. A separate final NTZ monitoring ATC can interject on the tower frequency. A secondary PRM frequency is also used and required to be monitored by pilots, so that in case the tower frequency is congested, pilots can still receive the breakout instruction. Special pilot training is required to fly this approach.

The approach procedure is designed like other instrument approach procedures, except the intercept angle between initial segment and final approach course is capped at 20° or 30° to avoid overshooting the final approach course centerline, and the intercept must occur prior to the segment where ATC no longer provides usual 1,000 feet vertical or 3 nautical mile radar separation. Missed approach procedures should diverge as soon as practical starting at least 400ft above touchdown zone elevation, and achieve a 45° divergence by 0.5 nautical miles beyond the most distant runway departure threshold unless an NTZ is established past that point.

As of 2024, PRM approaches are conducted at Hartsfield–Jackson Atlanta International Airport, Chicago O'Hare International Airport, Detroit Metro Wayne County Airport, and Sydney Airport.

=== Simultaneous offset instrument approach ===
Simultaneous offset instrument approach: MAPt: missed approach point for the offset approach; COC: point where the offset approach aircraft is cleared of cloud; NTZ: no transgression zone

Simultaneous Offset Instrument Approach (SOIA) allows simultaneous approaches to runways spaced less than 3,000 feet, but at least 750 feet apart, and with one final approach course offset by 2.5° to 3.0°. The SOIA procedure utilizes a straight-in PRM approach to one runway and a PRM offset approach with glideslope to the adjacent runway. In SOIA, aircraft are paired, with the aircraft conducting the straight-in PRM approach always positioned slightly ahead of the aircraft conducting the offset PRM approach. After clearing from the cloud, the offset aircraft is given at least 30 seconds before reaching missed approach point or decision altitude to obtain visual acquisition of the leading straight-in aircraft. In addition, the aircraft on the offset course should not have a turn radius greater than one tenth of the runway spacing to avoid trespassing the NTZ when going on a missed approach.

San Francisco International Airport established the SOIA procedure in 2005 but has phased out from it in favor of closely-spaced parallel runway operation procedures instead. Although no airport across the world implements active SOIA as of 2024, FAA still requires SOIA trainings for transport pilots, seeing SOIA potentially implemented in the future.

=== Simultaneous converging instrument approach ===
Simultaneous converging instrument approaches have non-intersecting missed approach course (red dashed lines).

Simultaneous converging instrument approaches (SCIA) provide a method of conducting straight-in instrument approaches to runways angling between 15° and 100° without the final approach course intersecting at each other. An operational ATC radar and precision instrument approach systems for each runway are required. For runways that intersect, SCIA is not allowed when the ceiling is less than 1,000 feet or the visibility is less than 3 miles. The missed approach point is required to be at least 3 nautical miles apart, and published missed approach course diverge by at least 45 degrees with non-overlapping primary TERPS surfaces.

Airports implementing SCIA include Minneapolis-Saint Paul International Airport and Philadelphia International Airport.

=== Dependent converging instrument approach ===
Use of converging runway display aid during dependent converging instrument approach. Red aircraft is approaching the primary runway. Its "ghost" (G) is projected onto the blue aircraft's final approach course at an equal distance to the common point (C). This helps controllers assess the stagger (S) between red and blue aircraft.

Dependent converging instrument approach (DCIA) is another option for converging or intersecting runways, where the converging aircraft maintain a stagger so that in the event of double missed approach, the traffic separation is guaranteed even at the intersection of flight paths. Converging runway display aid, a software that aid controllers by displaying a "ghost" target of an aircraft on other courses, is required to be operational. The runways are angling between 45° and 110°, with missed approach courses straight out until crossing the common point, beyond which the courses diverge 45° or greater.

The minimum authorized stagger distance is 2 nautical miles and can go up to 8 nautical miles when the aircraft being followed is an Airbus A388 or if the runway is sufficiently long. In principle, the longer the runway to the centerline intersection point (known as the common point) is, and the faster the trailing aircraft is, the more likely the two converging aircraft may catch up before the common point, and thus the longer the stagger needs to be. When the stagger value exceeds 2.5 nautical miles, most airports stop benefiting significantly from the DCIA operations. On the other hand, if the leading aircraft is faster than the trailing aircraft, a stagger of only 0.5 nautical mile is needed to provide sufficient theoretical safety spacing.

Philadelphia International Airport currently implements DCIA for its RNAV approach to runways 27R and 35. Amsterdam Airport Schiphol considered implementing DCIA, but Luchtverkeersleiding Nederland declined the proposal in 1998, as it requires regular ATC training given how infrequent the operation is.

== History ==
Prior to 1962, simultaneous approaches were already being used for two parallel runways at Chicago O'Hare International Airport after analysis on lateral deviation of aircraft on ILS approach. In 1974, based on experience with William B. Hartsfield Atlanta International Airport, which had runways 4,000 feet apart, FAA reduced the runway spacing requirement down to 4,300 feet. In the late 1980s, with the development and testing of PRM radars, the FAA permitted simultaneous approach to runways 3,400 feet apart. Another FAA project, called Multiple Parallel Approach Program, advanced the investigation and development of simultaneous approaches to three parallel runways. In 1986, the FAA Order 7110.98 established simultaneous converging instrument approaches. ICAO introduced simultaneous approaches in its standards in 1995, albeit only ILS was allowed. In 2018, the standards were expanded to include additional landing systems.

== Operation considerations ==
=== Pilot responsibility ===
Pilots will be informed by ATC and/or automatic terminal information service that simultaneous approach is in use. Pilots need to closely monitor and strictly execute instructions from ATC to reduce ATC intervention or penetrating the no transgression zone.

=== Target level of safety ===
In the United States, through comparison with accident rate of North American air carrier aircraft, the target level of safety for simultaneous approach is designed to be no more than one fatal accident per 25 million approaches.

=== Traffic collision avoidance system ===
When installed, traffic collision avoidance system (TCAS) will trigger a resolution advisory (RA) when two aircraft are in close proximity to each other. When two aircraft are converging at a very slow rate, such as during an approach to parallel runways, an additional protection known as "tau-cap" will be in effect. These protection mechanisms work in most airports with parallel approaches except for a few parallel approaches, which falsely trigger TCAS-RA when tau-cap mechanism is in effect. 10° interception for aircraft on track-to-fix is recommended to minimize alerts from TCAS and flight management systems and decrease overshoots. TCAS is not required for participation in closely-spaced operations.

=== Modes of operation ===
ICAO categorizes modes of operation on parallel or near parallel instrument runways to four modes:

- Mode 1: independent parallel approaches;
- Mode 2: dependent parallel approaches;
- Mode 3: Independent parallel departures;
- Mode 4: segregated parallel operations, where at least one runway is used exclusively for approaches or departures, while the other one may have exclusive or mixed operations.

The minimum runway spacing for mode 4 is required to be at least 2,500 ft, but may be decreased down to 300 m (980 ft) depending on the staggering between arrival runway and departure runway.

=== Capacity ===
A theoretical maximum arrival capacity may be achievable with independent parallel approaches, followed by dependent parallel approaches. However, difficulties with implementation and pilots' lack of familiarity hinder the effectiveness of simultaneous approaches.

== See also ==
- Simultaneous opposite direction parallel runway operations
- List of airports with triple takeoff/landing capability
